= 2021 Hockey East men's ice hockey tournament =

2021 Hockey East Men's ice hockey tournament
- Dates: March 10–20, 2021
- Teams: 10
- Finals site: Mullins Center; Amherst, Massachusetts
- Champions: Massachusetts (1st title)
- Winning coach: Greg Carvel (1st title)
- MVP: Bobby Trivigno (Massachusetts)
- Hockey East Men's Ice Hockey Tournaments

The 2021 Hockey East Men's Ice Hockey Tournament was the 36th tournament in the history of the conference. It was played between March 10 and March 20, 2021. Due to the COVID-19 pandemic, all games were played on campus locations, rather than the semifinal and final match traditionally being hosted at the TD Garden in Boston, Massachusetts. The UMass Minutemen defeated the UMass Lowell River Hawks to earn their first Hockey East tournament championship, and earned the conference's automatic bid into the 2021 NCAA Division I Men's Ice Hockey Tournament.

== Format ==
Due to the difficulties of scheduling during the regular season, it was announced in late 2020 that all 11 Hockey East teams qualified for the tournament. After further complications and cancellations throughout the season, a formula-based ranking system called the Hockey East Power Index (HEPI) was implemented to determine seeding. Additionally, the tournament was formatted so that all rounds would be single-elimination games, rather than traditionally a best-of-three series in the opening and quarterfinals rounds.

On March 5, it was announced that Merrimack would be unable to participate in the tournament due to a late positive test result among the team's Tier-I personnel. As a result, the 11-team tournament format was reduced to a 10-team format, and teams ranked below Merrimack in the final HEPI standings would move up a seed to compensate.

Seeds 7-10 will play a single elimination opening round game on March 10, 2021, as seeds 1-6 will earn a bye to the next round. Winning teams will be reseeded and then play a single elimination quarterfinal game on March 14, 2021. Following an additional reseeding, the four victorious teams will advance to the semifinals on March 17, 2021. The final two programs will battle in the championship game on March 20, 2021.

=== Standings ===
2020–21 Hockey East Standings
	Conference record										Overall record					
	GP	W	L	T	OTW	OTL	SOW	HEPI	GF	GA	GP	W	L	T	GF	GA
#6 Boston College	21	16	4	1	3	2	0	58.61	82	46	24	17	6	1	91	58
#11 Boston University	14	10	3	1	3	1	1	56.36	49	37	16	10	5	1	52	45
#1 Massachusetts *	22	13	5	4	1	1	1	55.44	76	42	29	20	5	4	103	48
Connecticut	22	10	10	2	1	4	2	52.01	69	63	23	10	11	2	70	69
#16 Providence	23	10	8	5	0	0	2	50.80	63	61	25	11	9	5	71	67
Northeastern	20	9	8	3	1	0	3	49.94	68	60	21	9	9	3	69	64
#19 Massachusetts–Lowell	16	7	8	1	1	1	0	48.00	46	53	20	10	9	1	59	63
Maine	15	3	10	2	0	1	2	46.66	41	61	16	3	11	2	43	68
Merrimack	18	5	11	2	0	1	0	45.38	47	66	18	5	11	2	47	66
New Hampshire	21	5	13	3	3	2	2	43.66	51	83	23	6	14	3	60	88
Vermont	12	1	9	2	0	0	0	38.02	17	37	13	1	10	2	20	42
Championship: March 20, 2021; No Regular Season Champion Awarded * indicates conference tournament champion (Lamoriello Trophy); Rankings: USCHO.com Top 20 Poll

== Bracket ==
Teams are reseeded after the Opening Round and Quarterfinals

Opening Round; March 10
7	Massachusetts–Lowell	5
10	Vermont	3
8	Maine	2
9	New Hampshire	7

Quarterfinals; March 14
1	Boston College	3
9	New Hampshire	2
2	Boston University	1
7	Massachusetts–Lowell	2
3	Massachusetts	4
6	Northeastern	1
4	Connecticut	1
5	Providence	6

Semifinals; March 17
1	Boston College	5
7	Massachusetts–Lowell	6**
3	Massachusetts	5
5	Providence	2

Championship; March 20
7	Massachusetts–Lowell	0
3	Massachusetts	1

Note: * denotes overtime period(s)

== Results ==
=== Opening Round ===
==== (7) UMass Lowell vs. (11) Vermont ====
March 10, 2021; 3:00 PM	UMass Lowell	5 – 3 (0–1, 4–1, 1–1)	Vermont	Tsongas Center, Lowell, Massachusetts; Attendance: 0

Game reference

Owen Savory
Goalies
Gabe Carriere
Referees:
Geoffrey Miller
Terrence Murphy
Linesmen:
Kevin Briganti
Nicholas Briganti

	0–1	17:29 – Jacques Bouquot (2) (Esposito, Dzhioshvili)
(Lee, Stefanson) Nolan Sawchuk (1) – 22:50	1–1
(Levesque, Meehan) Anthony Baxter (1) – 29:13	2–1
(Levesque, Barton) Matt Brown (5) – PP – 30:54	3–1
(Anthony Baxter) Matt Brown (6) – GW – 34:41	4–1
	4–2	39:24 – SH – Bryce Misley (1) (unassisted)
(Jon McDonald, Blake Wells) Seth Barton (2) – 43:05	5–2
	5–3	43:32 – Simon Boyko (2) (Evers)

12 min
Penalties
12 min
31
Shots
23

==== (8) Maine vs. (9) New Hampshire ====
March 10, 2021; 4:30 PM	Maine	2 – 7 (0–1, 2–3, 0–3)	New Hampshire	Alfond Arena, Orono, Maine; Attendance: 0

Game reference

Victor Ostman
Goalies
Mike Robinson
Referees:
Walker Holton
Jeremy Tufts
Linesmen:
Bill Kingdon
Jeff McCorkle

	0–1	17:00 – Kalle Eriksson (6) (Pierson, Crookshank)
	0–2	22:30 – PP – Eric MacAdams (4) (Engarås, Verrier)
(Dawe, Butala) Adrien Bisson (2) – 23:16	1–2
	1–3	23:51 – GW – Jackson Pierson (9) (MacKinnon)
(Sirota, Quinlivan) Lynden Breen (3) – 25:19	2–3
	2–4	30:21 – SH – Tyler Ward (3) (Engarås)
	2–5	41:00 – Filip Engarås (6) (unassisted)
	2–6	55:54 – SH EN – Luke Rein (2) (Verrier)
	2–7	57:49 – PP – Lucas Herrmann (3) (MacKinnon, Cipollone)

16 min
Penalties
10 min
22
Shots
36

=== Quarterfinals ===
==== (2) Boston University vs. (7) UMass Lowell ====
March 14, 2021; 1:05 PM	Boston University	1 – 2 (1–1, 0–0, 0–1)	UMass Lowell	Walter Brown Arena, Boston, Massachusetts; Attendance: 0

Game reference

Drew Commesso
Goalies
Henry Welsch
Referees:
Scott Hansen
Walker Holton
Linesmen:
Bob Bernard
Christopher Millea

(Peterson, Zabaneh) Jamie Armstrong (1) – 2:17	1–0
	1–1	4:30 – Matt Brown (7) (McDonald)
	1–2	48:19 – GW – Brian Chambers (3) (Lee, Stefanson)

4 min
Penalties
2 min
17
Shots
29

==== (4) Connecticut vs. (5) Providence ====
March 14, 2021; 3:30 PM	Connecticut	1 – 6 (0–1, 1–2, 0–3)	Providence	Freitas Ice Forum, Storrs, Connecticut; Attendance: 0

Game reference

Tomáš Vomáčka
Goalies
Jaxson Stauber
Referees:
Geoffrey Miller
Jeremy Tufts
Linesmen:
Jeff McCorkle
Bill Kingdon

	0–1	8:47 – Parker Ford (6) (Ruikka, Printz)
	0–2	21:58 – GW – Uula Ruikka (4) (McDonald, McDermott)
	0–3	22:58 – Nick Poisson (5) (Mirageas, Thompson)
(Evans, Karashik) Jáchym Kondelík (4) – 29:20	1–3
	1–4	41:45 – Tyce Thompson (11) (Poisson)
	1–5	50:53 – Brett Berard (4) (Yoder, Moynihan)
	1–6	55:20 – Max Crozier (3) (Berard, Mirageas)

8 min
Penalties
10 min
41
Shots
43

==== (3) Massachusetts vs. (6) Northeastern ====
March 14, 2021; 4:30 PM	Massachusetts	4 – 1 (2–0, 1–1, 1–0)	Northeastern	Mullins Center, Amherst, Massachusetts; Attendance: 0

Game reference

Filip Lindberg
Goalies
Connor Murphy
Referees:
Marty Hughes
Terrance Murphy
Linesmen:
Nick Briganti
Jeremy Lovett

(Trivigno, Lopina) Garret Wait (8) – 2:54	1–0
(Trivigno, Kessel) Zac Jones (7) – GW – 8:27	2–0
	2–1	30:37 – Jérémie Bucheler (1) (Struble)
(Felix) Bobby Trivigno (9) – 38:08	3–1
(Harding) Philip Lagunov (3) – 44:16	4–1

4 min
Penalties
2 min
28
Shots
26

==== (1) Boston College vs. (9) New Hampshire ====
March 14, 2021; 4:30 PM	Boston College	3 – 2 (3–0, 0–2, 0–0)	New Hampshire	Conte Forum, Chestnut Hill, Massachusetts; Attendance: 0

Game reference

Spencer Knight
Goalies
Mike Robinson
Referees:
Charles Hanfin
Peter Schlittenhardt
Linesmen:
Kyle Richetelle
Kevin Briganti

(Boldy, Helleson) Alex Newhook (5) – 5:35	1–0
(Powell, Boldy) Mike Hardman (9) – 7:30	2–0
(Ambrosio, Warren) Nikita Nesterenko (8) – GW – 8:25	3–0
	3–1	26:33 – Eric MacAdams (5) (Sato, Verrier)
	3–2	28:56 – Luke Reid (3) (MacAdams, Gendron)

4 min
Penalties
8 min
36
Shots
37

=== Semifinals ===
==== (1) Boston College vs. (7) UMass Lowell ====
March 17, 2021; 4:30 PM	Boston College	5 – 6 (2OT) (1–0, 3–1, 1–4, 0–0, 0–1)	UMass Lowell	Conte Forum, Chestnut Hill, Massachusetts; Attendance: 0

Game reference

Spencer Knight
Goalies
Henry Welsch
Referees:
Scott Hansen
Walker Holton
Linesmen:
Bill Kingdon
Jeff McCorckle

(Boldy, Newhook) Marshall Warren (3) – 7:34	1–0
(Boldy, Newhook) Mike Hardman (10) – 6:44	2–0
(Hardman, St. Ivany) Alex Newhook (6) – 32:40	3–0
	3–1	33:01 – Anthony Baxter (2) (unassisted)
(Boldy) Alex Newhook (7) – 38:47	4–1
	4–2	50:25 – Reid Stefanson (5) (Brown, Blackmun)
	4–3	55:33 – Andre Lee (7) (Blackmun, Wells)
	4–4	56:39 – PP – Lucas Condotta (6) (Lee)
(Boldy, Newhook) Marc McLaughlin (10) – PP – 57:53	5–4
	5–5	58:34 – EA – Anthony Baxter (3) (Levesque, Knoblauch)
	5–6	92:00 – GW – Matt Brown (8) (Barton)

12 min
Penalties
4 min
39
Shots
49

==== (3) Massachusetts vs. (5) Providence ====
March 17, 2021; 7:00 PM	Massachusetts	5 – 2 (2–2, 1–0, 2–0)	Providence	Mullins Center, Amherst, Massachusetts; Attendance: 0

Game reference

Filip Lindberg
Goalies
Jaxson Stauber
Referees:
Marty Hughes
Terrance Murphy
Linesmen:
Kevin Briganti
Kyle Richetelle

(Kessel, Trivigno) Josh Lopina (8) – 0:52	1–0
	1–1	6:00 – Brett Berard (5) (Poisson, Mirageas)
(Kessel, Trivigno) Zac Jones (8) – 11:46	2–1
	2–2	8:14 – PP – Parker Ford (7) (Thompson, Callahan)
(Jones) Bobby Trivigno (10) – GW – 21:22	3–2
(Del Gaizo, Felix) George Mika (3) – 49:32	4–2
(unassisted) Marc Del Gaizo (3) – EN – 59:18	5–2

2 min
Penalties
0 min
27
Shots
22

=== Finals ===
==== (3) Massachusetts vs. (7) UMass Lowell ====
March 20, 2021; 7:00 PM	Massachusetts	1 – 0 (1–0, 0–0, 0–0)	UMass Lowell	Mullins Center, Amherst, Massachusetts; Attendance: 0

Game reference
Filip Lindberg	Goalies	Henry Welsch	Referees: Peter Schlittenhardt; Jeremy Tufts; Linesmen: Bob Bernard; Nicholas Brignati
(Gicewicz, Chau) Jake Gaudet (3) – GW – 15:32 / 1–0			Referees: Peter Schlittenhardt; Jeremy Tufts; Linesmen: Bob Bernard; Nicholas Brignati
4 min	Penalties	4 min	Referees: Peter Schlittenhardt; Jeremy Tufts; Linesmen: Bob Bernard; Nicholas Brignati
22	Shots	16	Referees: Peter Schlittenhardt; Jeremy Tufts; Linesmen: Bob Bernard; Nicholas Brignati

== Tournament Awards ==
=== All-Tournament Team ===
- Goaltender – Filip Lindberg, Massachusetts
- Defenceman – Anthony Baxter, UMass Lowell
- Defenceman – Zac Jones, Massachusetts
- Forward – Matt Brown, UMass Lowell
- Forward – Jake Gaudet, Massachusetts
- Forward – Bobby Trivigno, Massachusetts

=== Tournament MVP ===
- Bobby Trivigno, Massachusetts
