= 2020–21 Boston University Terriers men's ice hockey season =

NCAA Tournament, Regional semifinal
- Conference: 2nd Hockey East
- Home ice: Agganis Arena

Rankings
- USCHO.com: 11
- USA Today/ US Hockey Magazine: 12

Record
- Overall: 10–5–1
- Conference: 10–3–1–3–1–1
- Home: 4–3–0
- Road: 6–1–1
- Neutral: 0–1–0

Coaches and captains
- Head coach: Albie O'Connell
- Assistant coaches: Paul Pearl; Len Quesnelle; Brian Eklund
- Captain: Logan Cockerill
- Alternate captain(s): Ty Amonte; David Farrance; Max Kaufman

The 2020–21 Boston University Terriers Men's ice hockey season was the 99th season of play for the program and the 37th season in the Hockey East conference. The Terriers represented Boston University and were coached by Albie O'Connell, in his 3rd season.

== Season ==
As a result of the ongoing COVID-19 pandemic the entire college ice hockey season was delayed. Because the NCAA had previously announced that all winter sports athletes would retain whatever eligibility they possessed through at least the following year, none of Boston University's players would lose a season of play. However, the NCAA also approved a change in its transfer regulations that would allow players to transfer and play immediately rather than having to sit out a season, as the rules previously required.

Due to COVID-19, the start to BU's season was delayed until even later than most schools. The Terriers weren't able to play their first game until January 8, but once they did make it onto the ice, Boston University performed very well. The Terriers won 9 out of 11 games and shot up the Hockey East standings despite playing much fewer games than their colleagues. As the team progressed BU was also hit by the injury bug. Ty Amonte, who missed the entire previous season due to an injury, was lost after just 2 games. During the season two of the team's top players, Drew Commesso and David Farrance, both were lost for several games but BU continued to find a way to win.

Further cancellations and delays limited the team to just 14 games in the regular season. In spite of their limited schedule, BU finished the season second place in Hockey East and was ranked in the middle of the top-20. The program was all but guaranteed a berth into the NCAA Tournament with their 10–3–1 record, which proved fortunate as the team lost its opening game in the conference quarterfinals. The Terriers were rather lackluster in the playoff match, recording just 17 shots on goal for the game and losing 1–2.

As predicted, Boston University was selected for the tournament. They were given the 3-seed in the Northeast region and set to face St. Cloud State in the opening round. BU managed to kill off a 5-minute major in the first period to keep the game scoreless and then opened the second with a goal after just 8 seconds. The Huskies responded with two goals in rapid succession but Boston University tied the game less than two minutes later. St. Cloud got a second lead before the period was out and the two entered the final frame with both still very much in contention. Despite a push by the Terriers, the team was unable to get any of their 16 shots into the net while St. Cloud State scored three more times and ended with a 6–2 victory over BU.

John Copeland sat out the season.

== Departures ==
Player	Position	Nationality	Cause
Hugo Blixt	Defenseman	Sweden	Transferred to Colorado College
Alex Brink	Forward	United States	Graduation
Gabe Chabot	Forward	Canada	Graduation (signed with Rapid City Rush)
Cam Crotty	Defenseman	Canada	Signed professional contract (Arizona Coyotes)
Patrick Curry	Forward	United States	Graduation (signed with Grand Rapids Griffins)
Patrick Harper	Forward	United States	Graduation (signed with Nashville Predators)
Kasper Kotkansalo	Defenseman	Finland	Signed professional contract (Ässät)
Nico Lynch	Goaltender	United States	Graduation
Vinnie Purpura	Goaltender	United States	Transferred to Long Island
Sam Tucker	Goaltender	United States	Graduation
Trevor Zegras	Forward	United States	Signed professional contract (Anaheim Ducks)

== Recruiting ==
Player	Position	Nationality	Age	Notes
Joseph Campolieto	Defenseman	United States	22	Eynon, PA; transfer from Union
Drew Commesso	Goaltender	United States	18	Norwell, MA; selected 46th overall in 2020
Vincent Duplessis	Goaltender	United States	21	Quebec City, QC
Thomas Jarman	Defenseman	United States	19	Pittsburgh, PA
Max Kaufman	Forward	United States	24	Pittsford, NY; graduate transfer from Vermont
Jay O'Brien	Forward	United States	19	Hingham, MA; transfer from Providence; selected 19th overall in 2018
Dylan Peterson	Forward	United States	18	Roseville, CA; selected 86th overall in 2020
Luke Tuch	Forward	United States	18	Baldwinsville, NY; selected 47th overall in 2020
Cade Webber	Defenseman	United States	18	Meadville, PA; selected 99th overall in 2019
Nick Zabaneh	Forward	Canada	19	Toronto, ON

== Roster ==
As of February 12, 2021.

No.	Nat.	Player	Class	Pos	Height	Weight	DoB	Hometown	Previous team	NHL rights
2	(United States)	Case McCarthy	Sophomore	D	6' 1" (1.85 m)	198 lb (90 kg)	2001-01-09	Clarence Center, New York	USNTDP (USHL)	NJD, 118th overall 2019
3	(United States)	Ty Amonte (A)	Junior (RS)	F	5' 11" (1.8 m)	175 lb (79 kg)	1998-01-11	Norwell, Massachusetts	Penticton Vees (BCHL)	—
4	(United States)	David Farrance (A)	Senior	D	6' 0" (1.83 m)	190 lb (86 kg)	1999-06-23	Victor, New York	USNTDP (USHL)	NSH, 92nd overall 2017
5	(United States)	Thomas Jarman	Freshman	D	6' 3" (1.91 m)	200 lb (91 kg)	2001-04-09	Gibsonia, Pennsylvania	Maryland Black Bears (NAHL)	—
7	(United States)	Alex Vlasic	Sophomore	D	6' 6" (1.98 m)	199 lb (90 kg)	2001-06-05	Wilmette, Illinois	USNTDP (USHL)	CHI, 43rd overall 2019
8	(United States)	Cade Webber	Freshman	D	6' 7" (2.01 m)	215 lb (98 kg)	2001-01-05	Meadville, Pennsylvania	Penticton Vees (BCHL)	CAR, 99th overall 2019
9	(United States)	Logan Cockerill (C)	Senior	F	5' 9" (1.75 m)	175 lb (79 kg)	1999-03-03	Brighton, Michigan	USNTDP (USHL)	NYI, 201st overall 2017
10	(Canada)	Nick Zabaneh	Freshman	F	5' 10" (1.78 m)	182 lb (83 kg)	2001-03-27	Toronto, Ontario	Green Bay Gamblers (USHL)	—
11	(United States)	Luke Tuch	Freshman	F	6' 2" (1.88 m)	203 lb (92 kg)	2002-03-07	Baldwinsville, New York	USNTDP (USHL)	MTL, 47th overall 2020
12	(United States)	Jamie Armstrong	Sophomore	F	6' 2" (1.88 m)	192 lb (87 kg)	1998-08-07	Warwick, Rhode Island	Boston Junior Bruins (NCDC)	—
13	(United States)	Dylan Peterson	Freshman	F	6' 4" (1.93 m)	192 lb (87 kg)	2002-01-08	Roseville, California	USNTDP (USHL)	STL, 86th overall 2020
14	(United States)	Sean Driscoll	Sophomore	D	6' 2" (1.88 m)	194 lb (88 kg)	1998-07-02	Mequon, Wisconsin	Janesville Jets (NAHL)	—
15	(Canada)	Markus Boguslavsky	Sophomore	F	6' 1" (1.85 m)	190 lb (86 kg)	1999-05-15	Calgary, Alberta	Drumheller Dragons (AJHL)	—
16	(United States)	Robert Mastrosimone	Sophomore	F	5' 10" (1.78 m)	170 lb (77 kg)	2001-01-24	East Islip, New York	Chicago Steel (USHL)	DET, 54th overall 2019
17	(United States)	Jake Wise	Junior	F	5' 11" (1.8 m)	190 lb (86 kg)	2000-02-28	Reading, Massachusetts	USNTDP (USHL)	CHI, 69th overall 2018
18	(United States)	Jay O'Brien	Sophomore	F	6' 0" (1.83 m)	184 lb (83 kg)	1999-11-04	Hingham, Massachusetts	Penticton Vees (BCHL)	PHI, 19th overall 2018
19	(United States)	Jack DeBoer	Junior	F	6' 3" (1.91 m)	188 lb (85 kg)	2000-08-17	Madison, New Jersey	USNTDP (USHL)	—
20	(United States)	Matthew Quercia	Junior	F	6' 3" (1.91 m)	202 lb (92 kg)	1999-02-24	Andover, Massachusetts	Sioux Falls Stampede (USHL)	—
21	(United States)	Max Kaufman	Graduate	F	5' 8" (1.73 m)	165 lb (75 kg)	1996-06-26	Rochester, New York	Vermont (HEA)	—
22	(United States)	Jake Witkowski	Senior	F	5' 10" (1.78 m)	178 lb (81 kg)	1996-08-28	Melrose, Massachusetts	Alberni Valley Bulldogs (BCHL)	—
23	(United States)	Domenick Fensore	Sophomore	D	5' 9" (1.75 m)	165 lb (75 kg)	2001-09-07	Thornwood, New York	USNTDP (USHL)	CAR, 90th overall 2019
25	(Canada)	Sam Stevens	Sophomore	F	6' 1" (1.85 m)	184 lb (83 kg)	2000-04-27	Montreal, Quebec	Sioux Falls Stampede (USHL)	—
26	(United States)	Joseph Campolieto	Senior	D	6' 0" (1.83 m)	185 lb (84 kg)	1998-04-29	Eynon, Pennsylvania	Union (ECAC)	—
27	(United States)	John Copeland	Sophomore	D	6' 6" (1.98 m)	181 lb (82 kg)	1999-03-03	Wellesley, Massachusetts	Carleton Place Canadians (CCHL)	—
28	(Canada)	Ethan Phillips	Sophomore	F	5' 10" (1.78 m)	160 lb (73 kg)	2001-05-07	Dartmouth, Nova Scotia	Sioux Falls Stampede (USHL)	DET, 97th overall 2019
29	(United States)	Drew Commesso	Freshman	G	6' 2" (1.88 m)	180 lb (82 kg)	2002-07-19	Norwell, Massachusetts	USNTDP (USHL)	CHI, 46th overall 2020
30	(Canada)	Ashton Abel	Sophomore	G	6' 0" (1.83 m)	165 lb (75 kg)	1999-10-22	Fort McMurray, Alberta	Okotoks Oilers (AJHL)	—
31	(Canada)	Vinny Duplessis	Freshman	G	6' 1" (1.85 m)	170 lb (77 kg)	1999-03-19	Quebec City, Quebec	Whitecourt Wolverines (AJHL)	—
32	(Sweden)	Wilmer Skoog	Sophomore	F	6' 2" (1.88 m)	197 lb (89 kg)	1999-07-17	Tyresö, Sweden	Maryland Black Bears (NAHL)	—

== Standings ==
2020–21 Hockey East Standings
	Conference record										Overall record					
	GP	W	L	T	OTW	OTL	SOW	HEPI	GF	GA	GP	W	L	T	GF	GA
#6 Boston College	21	16	4	1	3	2	0	58.61	82	46	24	17	6	1	91	58
#11 Boston University	14	10	3	1	3	1	1	56.36	49	37	16	10	5	1	52	45
#1 Massachusetts *	22	13	5	4	1	1	1	55.44	76	42	29	20	5	4	103	48
Connecticut	22	10	10	2	1	4	2	52.01	69	63	23	10	11	2	70	69
#16 Providence	23	10	8	5	0	0	2	50.80	63	61	25	11	9	5	71	67
Northeastern	20	9	8	3	1	0	3	49.94	68	60	21	9	9	3	69	64
#19 Massachusetts–Lowell	16	7	8	1	1	1	0	48.00	46	53	20	10	9	1	59	63
Maine	15	3	10	2	0	1	2	46.66	41	61	16	3	11	2	43	68
Merrimack	18	5	11	2	0	1	0	45.38	47	66	18	5	11	2	47	66
New Hampshire	21	5	13	3	3	2	2	43.66	51	83	23	6	14	3	60	88
Vermont	12	1	9	2	0	0	0	38.02	17	37	13	1	10	2	20	42
Championship: March 20, 2021; No Regular Season Champion Awarded * indicates conference tournament champion (Lamoriello Trophy); Rankings: USCHO.com Top 20 Poll

== Schedule and results ==
Date	Time	Opponent^{#}	Rank^{#}	Site	TV	Decision	Result	Attendance	Record
Regular season
January 8	6:00 PM	vs. #16 Providence		Walter Brown Arena • Boston, Massachusetts	NESN+	Commesso	L 3–7	0	0–1–0 (0–1–0)
January 9	7:00 PM	at #16 Providence		Schneider Arena • Providence, Rhode Island	NESN	Commesso	W 6–4	0	1–1–0 (1–1–0)
January 17	3:30 PM	at #8 Massachusetts		Mullins Center • Amherst, Massachusetts	NESN	Commesso	W 4–2	0	2–1–0 (2–1–0)
January 18	3:05 PM	vs. #8 Massachusetts		Walter Brown Arena • Boston, Massachusetts		Commesso	W 4–3 ^{OT}	0	3–1–0 (3–1–0)
January 22	3:35 PM	vs. Maine		Walter Brown Arena • Boston, Massachusetts	NESN	Commesso	W 3–2 ^{OT}	0	4–1–0 (4–1–0)
January 23	1:05 PM	vs. Maine		Walter Brown Arena • Boston, Massachusetts		Commesso	W 5–1	0	5–1–0 (5–1–0)
February 5	7:00 PM	at #1 Boston College	#15	Conte Forum • Chestnut Hill, Massachusetts	NESN+	Abel	L 3–4 ^{OT}	0	5–2–0 (5–2–0)
February 6	7:05 PM	vs. #1 Boston College	#15	Walter Brown Arena • Boston, Massachusetts		Duplessis	W 3–1	0	6–2–0 (6–2–0)
February 12	6:00 PM	at Vermont	#13	Gutterson Fieldhouse • Burlington, Vermont		Duplessis	W 1–0	0	7–2–0 (7–2–0)
February 13	6:00 PM	at Vermont	#13	Gutterson Fieldhouse • Burlington, Vermont		Duplessis	W 5–1	0	8–2–0 (8–2–0)
February 20	4:00 PM	at Connecticut	#11	Mark Edward Freitas Ice Forum • Storrs, Connecticut		Duplessis	W 3–2 ^{OT}	0	9–2–0 (9–2–0)
February 26	4:05 PM	vs. Merrimack	#8	Walter Brown Arena • Boston, Massachusetts		Duplessis	L 2–5	0	9–3–0 (9–3–0)
February 27	4:05 PM	at Merrimack	#8	J. Thom Lawler Rink • North Andover, Massachusetts		Commesso	W 4–2	0	10–3–0 (10–3–0)
March 6	3:00 PM	at Massachusetts–Lowell	#10	Tsongas Center • Lowell, Massachusetts		Commesso	T 3–3 ^{SOW}	0	10–3–1 (10–3–1)
Hockey East Tournament
March 14	1:05 PM	vs. Massachusetts–Lowell*	#9	Walter Brown Arena • Boston, Massachusetts (Quarterfinal)	NESN+	Commesso	L 1–2	0	10–4–1
NCAA Tournament
March 27	1:00 PM	vs. #7 St. Cloud State*	#10	Times Union Center • Albany, New York (Regional semifinal)	ESPNews	Commesso	L 2–6	1,136	10–5–1
*Non-conference game. ^{#}Rankings from USCHO.com Poll. All times are in Eastern Time.

== Scoring statistics ==
Name	Position	Games	Goals	Assists	Points	PIM
Jay O'Brien	C	16	8	8	16	8
David Farrance	D	11	5	11	16	4
Luke Tuch	LW	16	6	5	11	12
Logan Cockerill	LW/RW	12	5	5	10	6
Wilmer Skoog	C	14	4	4	8	2
Robert Mastrosimone	C/LW	15	3	5	8	6
Alex Vlasic	F	16	3	5	8	10
Domenick Fensore	D	16	2	6	8	16
Max Kaufman	F	15	1	7	8	4
Nick Zabaneh	F	16	0	7	7	4
Dylan Peterson	C	16	3	3	6	25
Markus Boguslavsky	RW	15	4	1	5	4
Matthew Quercia	F	16	2	1	3	4
Jack DeBoer	C	7	1	2	3	0
Jamie Armstrong	LW	16	1	2	3	6
Ty Amonte	RW	2	1	1	2	2
Jake Wise	C	5	1	1	2	4
Case McCarthy	D	12	1	1	2	8
Sam Stevens	F	11	0	2	2	2
Cade Webber	D	14	0	2	2	15
Thomas Jarman	D	16	0	2	2	10
Sean Driscoll	D	4	1	0	1	2
Ethan Phillips	C/RW	1	0	0	0	0
Ashton Abel	G	2	0	0	0	0
Vinny Duplessis	G	5	0	0	0	0
Jake Witkowski	F	6	0	0	0	6
Drew Commesso	G	11	0	0	0	0
Joseph Campolieto	D	16	0	0	0	4
Bench	-	-	-	-	-	10
Total			52	81	133	174

== Goaltending statistics ==
Name	Games	Minutes	Wins	Losses	Ties	Goals against	Saves	Shut outs	SV %	GAA
Vinny Duplessis	5	253	4	1	0	7	107	1	.939	1.66
Drew Commesso	11	641	6	3	1	32	346	0	.915	2.99
Ashton Abel	2	77	0	1	0	5	38	0	.884	3.89
Empty Net	-	23	-	-	-	3	-	-	-	-
Total	16	974	10	5	1	45	491	1	.916	2.77

== Rankings ==
Poll	Week																					
Poll	Pre	1	2	3	4	5	6	7	8	9	10	11	12	13	14	15	16	17	18	19	20	21 (Final)
USCHO.com	NR	20	20	NR	NR	NR	NR	NR	NR	NR	NR	15	15	13	11	8	10	9	11	10	-	11
USA Today	NR	NR	NR	NR	NR	NR	NR	NR	NR	NR	NR	15	15	13	12	8	11	10	11	11	12	12

USCHO did not release a poll in week 20.

== Awards and honors ==
Player	Award	Ref
David Farrance	AHCA East First Team All-American	
David Farrance	Hockey East First Team	
Drew Commesso	Hockey East Rookie Team	
Luke Tuch	Hockey East Rookie Team	

== Players drafted into the NHL ==
=== 2021 NHL entry draft ===
Round	Pick	Player	NHL team
1	10	Tyler Boucher^{†}	Ottawa Senators
6	186	Shane Lachance^{†}	Edmonton Oilers
7	217	Ty Gallagher^{†}	Boston Bruins

† incoming freshman
