= 2020–21 New Hampshire Wildcats men's ice hockey season =

- Conference: 10th Hockey East
- Home ice: Whittemore Center

Rankings
- USCHO: NR
- USA Today: NR

Record
- Overall: 6–14–3
- Conference: 5–13–3–3–3–2
- Home: 2–7–2
- Road: 4–7–1
- Neutral: 0–0–0

Coaches and captains
- Head coach: Mike Souza
- Assistant coaches: Glenn Stewart; Jeff Giuliano; Ty Conklin
- Captain: Charlie Kelleher
- Alternate captain(s): Patrick Grasso; Benton Maass; Eric MacAdams

The 2020–21 New Hampshire Wildcats Men's ice hockey season was the 95th season of play for the program and the 37th season in the Hockey East conference. The Wildcats represented the University of New Hampshire and were coached by Mike Souza, in his 3rd season.

== Season ==
As a result of the ongoing COVID-19 pandemic the entire college ice hockey season was delayed. Because the NCAA had previously announced that all winter sports athletes would retain whatever eligibility they possessed through at least the following year, none of New Hampshire's players would lose a season of play. However, the NCAA also approved a change in its transfer regulations that would allow players to transfer and play immediately rather than having to sit out a season, as the rules previously required.

After a good start to the season, UNH was bit by the injury bug. The team lost several key upperclassmen for extended periods, including team captain Charlie Kelleher. The Wildcats were able to play well in some of their games but the team went through an 8-game stretch where they couldn't win a single match. By the end of the season the team had gotten healthy again, but they sat 10th in the conference. UNH came alive in the Hockey East Tournament, knocking off long-time rival Maine 7–2 in the opening round. The Wildcats then took on the top team in the nation, Boston College and came close to pulling off a stunning upset, falling 2–3 in their final game of the year.

Jeremy Forman sat out the season.

== Departures ==
Player	Position	Nationality	Cause
Liam Blackburn	Forward	Canada	Graduation (Signed with ERSC Amberg)
Matthew Dawson	Defenseman	Canada	Graduation
Justin Fregona	Forward	Canada	Graduation
Max Gildon	Defenseman	United States	Signed professional contract (Florida Panthers)
Robby Griffin	Forward	United States	Left program
Joey Lazzaro	Goaltender	United States	Graduation
Nolan McElhaney	Defenseman	United States	Transferred to Long Island
Joe Sacco	Forward	United States	Graduation
Anthony Wyse	Defenseman	United States	Graduation (Signed with Indy Fuel)

== Recruiting ==
Player	Position	Nationality	Age	Notes
Nick Cafarelli	Forward	United States	18	Middleton, MA
Jeremy Forman	Goaltender	United States	21	Northbrook, IL
Cameron Gendron	Forward	United States	21	Wilmington, MA
Nikolai Jenson	Defenseman	United States	20	Cold Spring, MN
Joe Nagle	Defenseman	United States	21	Weymouth, MA
Luke Reid	Defenseman	United States	19	Geneva, IL; 166th selection in the 2020 NHL entry draft
Carsen Richels	Forward	United States	18	Ham Lake, MN
Alec Semandel	Defenseman	United States	19	Waunakee, WI; transfer from Lake Superior State
Tyler Ward	Forward	Canada	21	Kamloops, BC; transfer from Denver

== Roster ==
As of February 12, 2021.

No.	Nat.	Player	Class	Pos	Height	Weight	DoB	Hometown	Previous team	NHL rights
1	(United States)	Jeremy Forman	Freshman	G	5' 10" (1.78 m)	150 lb (68 kg)	1999-09-22	Northbrook, Illinois	Corpus Christi IceRays (NAHL)	—
2	(United States)	Drew Hickey	Junior	D	5' 11" (1.8 m)	188 lb (85 kg)	1997-10-28	New Canaan, Connecticut	Connecticut Jr. Rangers (NCDC)	—
3	(United States)	Ryan Verrier	Junior	D	6' 0" (1.83 m)	193 lb (88 kg)	1998-11-19	Reading, Massachusetts	Green Bay Gamblers (USHL)	—
5	(United States)	Will MacKinnon	Junior	D	5' 11" (1.8 m)	202 lb (92 kg)	2000-04-13	Plymouth, Michigan	Des Moines Buccaneers (USHL)	—
6	(United States)	Lucas Herrmann	Sophomore	F	6' 2" (1.88 m)	210 lb (95 kg)	2000-08-01	Lancaster, New York	Madison Capitols (USHL)	—
7	(United States)	Alec Semandel	Junior	D	6' 3" (1.91 m)	206 lb (93 kg)	1998-05-23	Waunakee, Wisconsin	Lake Superior State (WCHA)	—
8	(United States)	Nikolai Jenson	Freshman	D	5' 11" (1.8 m)	193 lb (88 kg)	2000-07-28	Cold Spring, Minnesota	Youngstown Phantoms (USHL)	—
9	(Canada)	Angus Crookshank	Junior	F	5' 11" (1.8 m)	179 lb (81 kg)	1999-10-02	North Vancouver, British Columbia	Langley Rivermen (BCHL)	OTT, 126th overall 2018
10	(Sweden)	Kalle Eriksson	Sophomore	D	5' 10" (1.78 m)	178 lb (81 kg)	1999-09-15	Leksand, Sweden	Madison Capitols (USHL)	—
11	(United States)	Jackson Pierson	Junior	F	5' 9" (1.75 m)	171 lb (78 kg)	1999-09-10	Zionsville, Indiana	Culver Academies (Midget AAA)	—
12	(United States)	Eric Esposito	Junior	F	5' 11" (1.8 m)	186 lb (84 kg)	1998-08-24	West Haven, Connecticut	Youngstown Phantoms (USHL)	—
13	(United States)	Nick Cafarelli	Freshman	F	5' 10" (1.78 m)	182 lb (83 kg)	2001-12-31	Middleton, Massachusetts	Wenatchee Wild (BCHL)	—
14	(Canada)	Tyler Ward	Junior	F	5' 10" (1.78 m)	186 lb (84 kg)	1999-08-19	Kamloops, British Columbia	Denver (NCHC)	—
15	(Canada)	Chase Stevenson	Sophomore	F	5' 11" (1.8 m)	180 lb (82 kg)	1999-01-13	West Kelowna, British Columbia	Trail Smoke Eaters (BCHL)	—
16	(Sweden)	Filip Engarås	Junior	F	6' 0" (1.83 m)	199 lb (90 kg)	1999-05-16	Stockholm, Sweden	Skellefteå (J20 SuperElit)	EDM, 169th overall 2020
17	(United States)	Carsen Richels	Freshman	F	6' 3" (1.91 m)	220 lb (100 kg)	2001-10-03	Ham Lake, Minnesota	Blaine High School (USHS–MN)	—
18	(Japan)	Kohei Sato	Senior	F	6' 1" (1.85 m)	180 lb (82 kg)	1996-09-26	Nishitōkyō, Japan	Northeast Generals (NAHL)	—
19	(United States)	Eric MacAdams (A)	Senior	F	5' 11" (1.8 m)	187 lb (85 kg)	1997-04-29	Salem, Massachusetts	Dubuque Fighting Saints (USHL)	—
20	(United States)	Patrick Grasso (A)	Senior	F	5' 7" (1.7 m)	161 lb (73 kg)	1996-05-29	Ankeny, Iowa	Des Moines Buccaneers (USHL)	—
21	(United States)	Cam Gendron	Freshman	D	6' 3" (1.91 m)	181 lb (82 kg)	1999-02-05	Hampstead, New Hampshire	New Jersey Titans (NAHL)	—
22	(United States)	Joe Hankinson	Sophomore	F	6' 0" (1.83 m)	194 lb (88 kg)	1999-06-15	Hopkins, Minnesota	Cedar Rapids RoughRiders (USHL)	—
23	(United States)	Charlie Kelleher (C)	Senior	F	5' 8" (1.73 m)	163 lb (74 kg)	1997-02-04	Longmeadow, Massachusetts	Sioux City Musketeers (USHL)	—
25	(United States)	Joe Nagle	Freshman	D	5' 10" (1.78 m)	192 lb (87 kg)	1999-05-17	Weymouth, Massachusetts	New Jersey Titans (NAHL)	—
27	(Canada)	Luke Reid	Freshman	D	6' 0" (1.83 m)	192 lb (87 kg)	2001-09-26	Warman, Saskatchewan	Chicago Steel (USHL)	NSH, 166th overall 2020
28	(United States)	Benton Maass (A)	Senior	D	6' 2" (1.88 m)	205 lb (93 kg)	1998-11-25	Elk River, Minnesota	Elk River High School (USHS–MN)	WSH, 182nd overall 2017
29	(United States)	Joseph Cipollone	Junior	F	5' 8" (1.73 m)	180 lb (82 kg)	1997-03-29	Purchase, New York	Boston Junior Bruins (NCDC)	—
31	(United States)	Mike Robinson	Senior	G	6' 4" (1.93 m)	202 lb (92 kg)	1997-03-27	Bedford, New Hampshire	Springfield Jr. Blues (NAHL)	SJS, 86th overall 2015
35	(Canada)	Ty Taylor	Junior	G	6' 4" (1.93 m)	190 lb (86 kg)	1999-07-05	Richmond, British Columbia	Vernon Vipers (BCHL)	TBL, 214th overall 2018

== Standings ==
2020–21 Hockey East Standings
	Conference record										Overall record					
	GP	W	L	T	OTW	OTL	SOW	HEPI	GF	GA	GP	W	L	T	GF	GA
#6 Boston College	21	16	4	1	3	2	0	58.61	82	46	24	17	6	1	91	58
#11 Boston University	14	10	3	1	3	1	1	56.36	49	37	16	10	5	1	52	45
#1 Massachusetts *	22	13	5	4	1	1	1	55.44	76	42	29	20	5	4	103	48
Connecticut	22	10	10	2	1	4	2	52.01	69	63	23	10	11	2	70	69
#16 Providence	23	10	8	5	0	0	2	50.80	63	61	25	11	9	5	71	67
Northeastern	20	9	8	3	1	0	3	49.94	68	60	21	9	9	3	69	64
#19 Massachusetts–Lowell	16	7	8	1	1	1	0	48.00	46	53	20	10	9	1	59	63
Maine	15	3	10	2	0	1	2	46.66	41	61	16	3	11	2	43	68
Merrimack	18	5	11	2	0	1	0	45.38	47	66	18	5	11	2	47	66
New Hampshire	21	5	13	3	3	2	2	43.66	51	83	23	6	14	3	60	88
Vermont	12	1	9	2	0	0	0	38.02	17	37	13	1	10	2	20	42
Championship: March 20, 2021; No Regular Season Champion Awarded * indicates conference tournament champion (Lamoriello Trophy); Rankings: USCHO.com Top 20 Poll

== Schedule and results ==
Date	Time	Opponent^{#}	Rank^{#}	Site	TV	Decision	Result	Attendance	Record
Regular season
December 11	7:00 PM	vs. Maine		Whittemore Center • Durham, New Hampshire	NESN+	Robinson	T 1–1 ^{SOW}	0	0–0–1 (0–0–1)
December 12	7:00 PM	vs. Maine		Whittemore Center • Durham, New Hampshire	NESN+	Robinson	W 6–2	0	1–0–1 (1–0–1)
December 30	3:30 PM	vs. #9 Massachusetts		Whittemore Center • Durham, New Hampshire		Robinson	L 0–4	0	1–1–1 (1–1–1)
January 1	4:00 PM	vs. Connecticut		Whittemore Center • Durham, New Hampshire	NESN	Robinson	L 1–2	0	1–2–1 (1–2–1)
January 2	4:00 PM	at Connecticut		XL Center • Hartford, Connecticut		Robinson	W 2–1 ^{OT}	0	2–2–1 (2–2–1)
January 6	3:30 PM	at #8 Massachusetts		Mullins Center • Amherst, Massachusetts		Robinson	L 0–4	0	2–3–1 (2–3–1)
January 8	7:00 PM	at #2 Boston College		Conte Forum • Chestnut Hill, Massachusetts	NESN	Robinson	W 4–3 ^{OT}	0	3–3–1 (3–3–1)
January 10	4:00 PM	vs. #2 Boston College		Whittemore Center • Durham, New Hampshire		Robinson	L 2–3 ^{OT}	0	3–4–1 (3–4–1)
January 13	6:05 PM	at #14 Northeastern		Matthews Arena • Boston, Massachusetts	NESN	Robinson	L 0–7	0	3–5–1 (3–5–1)
January 15	4:00 PM	at Connecticut		Mark Edward Freitas Ice Forum • Storrs, Connecticut		Robinson	L 5–6 ^{OT}	0	3–6–1 (3–6–1)
January 16	5:00 PM	vs. Connecticut		Whittemore Center • Durham, New Hampshire		Taylor	L 3–8	0	3–7–1 (3–7–1)
January 22	7:00 PM	vs. Merrimack		Whittemore Center • Durham, New Hampshire		Robinson	L 2–5	0	3–8–1 (3–8–1)
January 23	4:05 PM	at Merrimack		J. Thom Lawler Rink • North Andover, Massachusetts		Robinson	T 2–2 ^{SOW}	0	3–8–2 (3–8–2)
January 29	7:00 PM	at #17 Providence		Schneider Arena • Providence, Rhode Island	NESN	Robinson	L 1–5	0	3–9–2 (3–9–2)
January 31	3:30 PM	vs. #17 Providence		Whittemore Center • Durham, New Hampshire	NESN	Robinson	L 2–3	0	3–10–2 (3–10–2)
February 5	6:00 PM	at #20 Massachusetts–Lowell		Tsongas Center • Lowell, Massachusetts		Robinson	W 2–1	0	4–10–2 (4–10–2)
February 6	5:00 PM	vs. #20 Massachusetts–Lowell		Whittemore Center • Durham, New Hampshire		Taylor	W 7–6 ^{OT}	0	5–10–2 (5–10–2)
February 12	7:00 PM	vs. #18 Northeastern		Whittemore Center • Durham, New Hampshire		Robinson	L 2–6	0	5–11–2 (5–11–2)
February 13	6:05 PM	at #18 Northeastern		Matthews Arena • Boston, Massachusetts	NESN+	Taylor	L 4–5	0	5–12–2 (5–12–2)
February 19	6:05 PM	vs. Merrimack		Whittemore Center • Durham, New Hampshire		Robinson	T 3–3 ^{SOW}	0	5–12–3 (5–12–3)
February 20	4:05 PM	at Merrimack		J. Thom Lawler Rink • North Andover, Massachusetts		Robinson	L 2–6	0	5–13–3 (5–13–3)
Hockey East Tournament
March 10	4:30 PM	at Maine		Alfond Arena • Orono, Maine (Opening Round)		Robinson	W 7–2	0	6–13–3
March 14	4:30 PM	at #1 Boston College		Conte Forum • Chestnut Hill, Massachusetts (Quarterfinal)	NESN	Robinson	L 2–3	0	6–14–3
*Non-conference game. ^{#}Rankings from USCHO.com Poll. All times are in Eastern Time.

== Scoring statistics ==
Name	Position	Games	Goals	Assists	Points	PIM
Jackson Pierson	F	23	9	16	25	4
Angus Crookshank	LW	20	9	9	18	4
Kalle Eriksson	D	23	6	12	18	2
Patrick Grasso	C	23	7	8	15	2
Filip Engarås	C	22	6	5	11	21
Eric MacAdams	RW	16	5	5	10	31
Ryan Verrier	D	23	2	8	10	24
Luke Reid	D	22	3	5	8	12
Kohei Sato	LW	22	1	7	8	33
Lucas Herrmann	F	17	3	4	7	4
Tyler Ward	LW	21	3	4	7	6
Cam Gendron	F	16	2	4	6	6
Nick Cafarelli	F	14	1	5	6	4
William MacKinnon	D	22	0	5	5	20
Benton Maass	D	20	2	2	4	4
Charlie Kelleher	RW	13	0	4	4	10
Joe Hankinson	F	13	1	1	2	4
Nikolai Jenson	D	20	0	2	2	12
Joseph Cipollone	C	12	0	1	1	0
Eric Esposito	LW	17	0	1	1	20
Carsen Richels	LW	22	0	1	1	8
Chase Stevenson	F	4	0	0	0	0
Ty Taylor	G	5	0	0	0	0
Drew Hickey	D	6	0	0	0	4
Joe Nagle	D	7	0	0	0	2
Alec Semandel	D	19	0	0	0	2
Mike Robinson	G	21	0	0	0	2
Bench	-	23	-	-	-	10
Total			60	109	169	251

== Goaltending statistics ==
Name	Games	Minutes	Wins	Losses	Ties	Goals against	Saves	Shut outs	SV %	GAA
Mike Robinson	21	1227	5	12	3	69	511	0	.881	3.37
Ty Taylor	5	165	1	2	0	17	69	0	.802	6.16
Empty Net	-	10	-	-	-	2	-	-	-	-
Total	23	1403	6	14	3	88	580	0	.868	3.76

== Rankings ==
Poll	Week																					
Poll	Pre	1	2	3	4	5	6	7	8	9	10	11	12	13	14	15	16	17	18	19	20	21 (Final)
USCHO.com	NR	NR	NR	NR	NR	NR	NR	NR	NR	NR	NR	NR	NR	NR	NR	NR	NR	NR	NR	NR	-	NR
USA Today	NR	NR	NR	NR	NR	NR	NR	NR	NR	NR	NR	NR	NR	NR	NR	NR	NR	NR	NR	NR	NR	NR

USCHO did not release a poll in week 20.

== Awards and honors ==
Player	Award	Ref
Patrick Grasso	Len Ceglarski Award	
Jackson Pierson	Hockey East Second Team	
Angus Crookshank	Hockey East Third Team	

== Players drafted into the NHL ==
=== 2021 NHL entry draft ===
Round	Pick	Player	NHL team
3	88	Stiven Sardarian^{†}	Buffalo Sabres
6	192	Alex Gagne^{†}	Tampa Bay Lightning

† incoming freshman
