= 2020–21 Maine Black Bears men's ice hockey season =

- Conference: 8th Hockey East
- Home ice: Alfond Arena

Rankings
- USCHO: NR
- USA Today: NR

Record
- Overall: 3–11–2
- Conference: 3–10–2–0–1–2
- Home: 0–1–0
- Road: 3–10–2
- Neutral: 0–0–0

Coaches and captains
- Head coach: Red Gendron
- Assistant coaches: Ben Guité; Alfie Michaud; Larry Cockrell
- Captain: Jack Quinlivan

The 2020–21 Maine Black Bears Men's ice hockey season was the 46th season of play for the program, the 44th season competing at the Division I level, and the 37th season in the Hockey East conference. The Black Bears represented the University of Maine and played their home games at Alfond Arena, and were coached by Red Gendron, in his 8th season as their head coach.

== Season ==
As a result of the ongoing COVID-19 pandemic the entire college ice hockey season was delayed. Because the NCAA had previously announced that all winter sports athletes would retain whatever eligibility they possessed through at least the following year, none of Maine's players would lose a season of play. However, the NCAA also approved a change in its transfer regulations that would allow players to transfer and play immediately rather than having to sit out a season, as the rules previously required.

Maine played all of its regular season games on the road. Despite there being no crowds in any of the buildings, travelling for all of their games did no favors for the team and Maine won only three of their contests all season. Due to the difficulty of their schedule, Maine was ranked 8th in the Hockey East Power Index and was able to finally play at home in the first round of the Hockey East Tournament. The home site didn't change the team's fortunes, however, and Maine lost 2–7 to New Hampshire, ending their season.

Kevin Hock and Keenan Suthers sat out the season.

Shortly after the end of the season, head coach Red Gendron died following a medical episode while on a golf course. He was 63.

== Departures ==
Player	Position	Nationality	Cause
Tim Doherty	Forward	United States	Graduate transfer to Penn State
Mitch Fossier	Forward	United States	Graduation (Signed with Rockford IceHogs)
Adrián Holešinský	Forward	Slovakia	Signed professional contract (HK Nitra)
Stephen Mundinger	Goaltender	United States	Graduate transfer to Long Island
Sam Rennaker	Forward	United States	Graduation
Patrick Shea	Forward	United States	Graduation
Ryan Smith	Forward	United States	Graduation (Signed with Macon Mayhem)
Jeremy Swayman	Goaltender	United States	Signed professional contract (Boston Bruins)

== Recruiting ==
Player	Position	Nationality	Age	Notes
Connor Androlewicz	Goaltender	United States	19	St. Louis, MO
Zach Aughe	Forward	United States	20	Clarkston, MI
Lynden Breen	Forward	Canada	19	Grand Bay-Westfield, NB
Kabore Dunn	Defenseman	United States	18	Mill Bay, BC
Donovan Houle-Villeneuve	Forward	Canada	20	Montréal, QC
Brad Morrissey	Forward	Canada	19	Tignish, PE
Jonny Mulera	Forward	Canada	21	Rockville, MD
Victor Östman	Goaltender	Sweden	19	Danderyd, SWE
Tristan Poissant	Forward	Canada	20	Les Coteaux, QC
Keenan Suthers	Forward	Canada	21	Tecumseh, ON; transfer from St. Lawrence

== Roster ==
As of February 12, 2021.

No.	Nat.	Player	Class	Pos	Height	Weight	DoB	Hometown	Previous team	NHL rights
2	(Czech Republic)	Jakub Sirota	Junior	D	6' 2" (1.88 m)	205 lb (93 kg)	1998-12-20	Kroměříž, Czech Republic	Lone Star Brahmas (NAHL)	—
3	(Canada)	Keenan Suthers	Senior	F	6' 8" (2.03 m)	245 lb (111 kg)	1998-04-27	Tecumseh, Ontario	St. Lawrence (ECAC)	—
4	(United States)	Jack Quinlivan (C)	Senior	F	6' 0" (1.83 m)	195 lb (88 kg)	1996-05-20	Shrewsbury, Massachusetts	Boston Junior Bruins (USPHL)	—
5	(Canada)	Kabore Dunn	Freshman	D	6' 2" (1.88 m)	178 lb (81 kg)	2001-11-10	Mill Bay, British Columbia	Fort McMurray Oil Barons (AJHL)	—
6	(United States)	Simon Butala	Junior	D	6' 2" (1.88 m)	190 lb (86 kg)	1998-08-01	Downingtown, Pennsylvania	Central Illinois Flying Aces (USHL)	—
7	(Canada)	Tristan Poissant	Freshman	F	6' 1" (1.85 m)	185 lb (84 kg)	2000-08-27	Les Coteaux, Quebec	Johnstown Tomahawks (NAHL)	—
10	(United States)	Kevin Hock	Senior	F	5' 11" (1.8 m)	186 lb (84 kg)	1996-11-09	Braintree, Massachusetts	South Shore Kings (USPHL)	—
11	(Canada)	Donavan Houle-Villeneuve	Freshman	F	6' 0" (1.83 m)	185 lb (84 kg)	1999-11-04	Montreal, Quebec	Flin Flon Bombers (SJHL)	—
12	(Canada)	Ben Poisson	Sophomore	F	6' 1" (1.85 m)	195 lb (88 kg)	1999-08-31	Vancouver, British Columbia	Prince George Spruce Kings (BCHL)	—
13	(United States)	Zachary Aughe	Freshman	F	6' 3" (1.91 m)	205 lb (93 kg)	2000-02-18	Clarkston, Michigan	Aberdeen Wings (NAHL)	—
14	(Denmark)	Jacob Schmidt-Svejstrup	Junior	F	6' 2" (1.88 m)	205 lb (93 kg)	1998-01-18	Charlottenlund, Denmark	Fargo Force (USHL)	—
15	(United States)	Brady Gaudette	Sophomore	F	5' 10" (1.78 m)	175 lb (79 kg)	1999-03-19	Braintree, Massachusetts	Northeast Generals (NAHL)	—
16	(Canada)	Levi Kleiboer	Sophomore	D	5' 11" (1.8 m)	177 lb (80 kg)	1998-07-17	Martensville, Saskatchewan	Minot Minotauros (NAHL)	—
17	(United States)	A. J. Drobot	Sophomore	F	5' 10" (1.78 m)	175 lb (79 kg)	1998-04-14	Churchville, Pennsylvania	Fargo Force (USHL)	—
18	(United States)	J. D. Greenway	Senior	D	6' 5" (1.96 m)	212 lb (96 kg)	1998-04-27	Canton, New York	Dubuque Fighting Saints (USHL)	TOR, 72nd overall 2016
20	(Finland)	Veli-Matti Tiuraniemi	Senior	D	6' 0" (1.83 m)	193 lb (88 kg)	1997-06-17	Pietarsaari, Finland	Dubuque Fighting Saints (USHL)	—
21	(Sweden)	Edward Lindelöw	Junior	F	6' 1" (1.85 m)	205 lb (93 kg)	1997-06-10	Stockholm, Sweden	Minnesota Wilderness (NAHL)	—
22	(Canada)	Dawson Bruneski	Sophomore	F	5' 11" (1.8 m)	170 lb (77 kg)	1999-06-24	Camrose, Alberta	Drumheller Dragons (AJHL)	—
23	(United States)	Remy Parker	Sophomore	F	6' 3" (1.91 m)	170 lb (77 kg)	1998-04-27	Montclair, New Jersey	Jersey Hitmen (NCDC)	—
24	(Canada)	Adam Dawe	Junior	F	5' 8" (1.73 m)	161 lb (73 kg)	1999-01-18	Gander, Newfoundland	Sioux Falls Stampede (USHL)	—
25	(United States)	Perry Winfree	Sophomore	D	6' 1" (1.85 m)	180 lb (82 kg)	1999-11-24	Cary, North Carolina	Jersey Hitmen (NCDC)	—
26	(United States)	Cameron Spicer	Senior	D	6' 1" (1.85 m)	192 lb (87 kg)	1996-02-22	Erie, Colorado	Islanders Hockey Club (USPHL)	—
27	(Canada)	Lynden Breen	Freshman	F	5' 9" (1.75 m)	168 lb (76 kg)	2001-05-31	Grand Bay-Westfield, New Brunswick	Fargo Force (USHL)	—
28	(Canada)	Brad Morrissey	Freshman	F	5' 11" (1.8 m)	168 lb (76 kg)	2001-01-18	Tignish, Prince Edward Island	Lincoln Stars (USHL)	—
29	(Canada)	Adrien Bisson	Sophomore	D	6' 1" (1.85 m)	180 lb (82 kg)	1999-01-18	Cornwall, Ontario	Ottawa Jr. Senators (CCHL)	—
30	(Sweden)	Emil Westerlund	Senior	F	6' 2" (1.88 m)	198 lb (90 kg)	1998-02-16	Linköping, Sweden	Linköpings J20 (J20 SuperElit)	—
31	(United States)	John Mulera	Freshman	F	5' 8" (1.73 m)	165 lb (75 kg)	1999-03-11	Rockville, Maryland	Boston Junior Bruins (NCDC)	—
32	(Sweden)	Victor Östman	Freshman	G	6' 4" (1.93 m)	205 lb (93 kg)	2000-10-03	Danderyd, Sweden	Chicago Steel (USHL)	—
33	(United States)	Connor Androlewicz	Freshman	G	6' 2" (1.88 m)	202 lb (92 kg)	2000-11-28	St. Louis, Missouri	Lincoln Stars (USHL)	—
34	(Latvia)	Eduards Tralmaks	Senior	F	6' 4" (1.93 m)	210 lb (95 kg)	1997-02-17	Riga, Latvia	Chicago Steel (USHL)	—
35	(Canada)	Matthew Thiessen	Sophomore	G	6' 2" (1.88 m)	214 lb (97 kg)	2000-06-09	Altona, Manitoba	Dubuque Fighting Saints (USHL)	VAN, 192nd overall 2018

== Standings ==
2020–21 Hockey East Standings
	Conference record										Overall record					
	GP	W	L	T	OTW	OTL	SOW	HEPI	GF	GA	GP	W	L	T	GF	GA
#6 Boston College	21	16	4	1	3	2	0	58.61	82	46	24	17	6	1	91	58
#11 Boston University	14	10	3	1	3	1	1	56.36	49	37	16	10	5	1	52	45
#1 Massachusetts *	22	13	5	4	1	1	1	55.44	76	42	29	20	5	4	103	48
Connecticut	22	10	10	2	1	4	2	52.01	69	63	23	10	11	2	70	69
#16 Providence	23	10	8	5	0	0	2	50.80	63	61	25	11	9	5	71	67
Northeastern	20	9	8	3	1	0	3	49.94	68	60	21	9	9	3	69	64
#19 Massachusetts–Lowell	16	7	8	1	1	1	0	48.00	46	53	20	10	9	1	59	63
Maine	15	3	10	2	0	1	2	46.66	41	61	16	3	11	2	43	68
Merrimack	18	5	11	2	0	1	0	45.38	47	66	18	5	11	2	47	66
New Hampshire	21	5	13	3	3	2	2	43.66	51	83	23	6	14	3	60	88
Vermont	12	1	9	2	0	0	0	38.02	17	37	13	1	10	2	20	42
Championship: March 20, 2021; No Regular Season Champion Awarded * indicates conference tournament champion (Lamoriello Trophy); Rankings: USCHO.com Top 20 Poll

== Schedule and results ==
Date	Time	Opponent^{#}	Rank^{#}	Site	TV	Decision	Result	Attendance	Record
Regular season
December 11	7:00 PM	at New Hampshire		Whittemore Center • Durham, New Hampshire	NESN+	Thiessen	T 1–1 ^{SOW}	0	0–0–1 (0–0–1)
December 12	7:00 PM	at New Hampshire		Whittemore Center • Durham, New Hampshire	NESN+	Thiessen	L 2–6	0	0–1–1 (0–1–1)
January 3	6:00 PM	at #17 Massachusetts–Lowell		Tsongas Center • Lowell, Massachusetts		Thiessen	L 3–5	0	0–2–1 (0–2–1)
January 4	3:00 PM	at #15 Massachusetts–Lowell		Tsongas Center • Lowell, Massachusetts		Thiessen	L 5–9	0	0–3–1 (0–3–1)
January 8	1:00 PM	at Vermont		Gutterson Fieldhouse • Burlington, Vermont		Thiessen	L 4–5	0	0–4–1 (0–4–1)
January 9	1:00 PM	at Vermont		Gutterson Fieldhouse • Burlington, Vermont		Östman	W 4–3	0	1–4–1 (1–4–1)
January 15	3:30 PM	at #16 Providence		Schneider Arena • Providence, Rhode Island	NESN	Östman	W 4–3	0	2–4–1 (2–4–1)
January 16	4:30 PM	at #16 Providence		Schneider Arena • Providence, Rhode Island	NESN	Östman	L 2–3	0	2–5–1 (2–5–1)
January 22	3:35 PM	at Boston University		Agganis Arena • Boston, Massachusetts	NESN	Östman	L 2–3 ^{OT}	0	2–6–1 (2–6–1)
January 23	1:05 PM	at Boston University		Agganis Arena • Boston, Massachusetts		Östman	L 1–5	0	2–7–1 (2–7–1)
February 19	7:00 PM	vs. #1 Boston College		Conte Forum • Chestnut Hill, Massachusetts	NESN+	Thiessen	L 2–4	0	2–8–1 (2–8–1)
February 20	5:00 PM	vs. #1 Boston College		Conte Forum • Chestnut Hill, Massachusetts	NESN	Östman	L 0–3	0	2–9–1 (2–9–1)
February 26	4:00 PM	vs. Connecticut		Mark Edward Freitas Ice Forum • Storrs, Connecticut		Östman	W 6–4	0	3–9–1 (3–9–1)
February 27	4:00 PM	vs. Connecticut		Mark Edward Freitas Ice Forum • Storrs, Connecticut		Östman	L 2–4	0	3–10–1 (3–10–1)
March 5	2:30 PM	at #6 Massachusetts		Mullins Center • Amherst, Massachusetts	NESN	Östman	T 3–3 ^{SOW}	0	3–10–2 (3–10–2)
Hockey East Tournament
March 10	4:30 PM	vs. New Hampshire		Alfond Arena • Orono, Maine (Opening Round)		Östman	L 2–7	0	3–11–2
*Non-conference game. ^{#}Rankings from USCHO.com Poll. All times are in Eastern Time.

== Scoring statistics ==
Name	Position	Games	Goals	Assists	Points	PIM
Adam Dawe	C/RW	16	5	9	14	23
Lynden Breen	C	16	3	8	11	6
Jakub Sirota	D	16	1	10	11	4
Eduards Tralmaks	C/LW	12	6	4	10	26
Emil Westerlund	LW/RW	16	4	5	9	14
Jacob Schmidt-Svejstrup	RW	11	3	6	9	10
Ben Poisson	F	16	4	4	8	19
Adrien Bisson	D	16	2	4	6	6
J. D. Greenway	D	14	2	3	5	28
A. J. Drobot	RW	16	2	2	4	2
John Mulera	F	9	0	4	4	4
Brad Morrissey	RW	8	3	0	3	8
Tristan Poissant	F	14	2	1	3	2
Veli-Matti Tiuraniemi	D	14	0	3	3	6
Levi Kleiboer	D	7	2	0	2	2
Brady Gaudette	F	13	2	0	2	6
Jack Quinlivan	F	14	1	1	2	8
Kabore Dunn	D	7	0	2	2	4
Dawson Bruneski	D	10	0	2	2	6
Simon Butala	D	16	0	2	2	35
Donovan Houle-Villeneuve	C	16	0	2	2	14
Edward Lindelöw	C	8	1	0	1	2
Cameron Spicer	D	8	0	1	1	2
Matthew Thiessen	G	8	0	1	1	0
Perry Winfree	D	2	0	0	0	0
Remy Parker	F	3	0	0	0	0
Zachary Aughe	C	6	0	0	0	4
Victor Östman	G	11	0	0	0	0
Bench	-	16	-	-	-	4
Total			43	74	117	245

== Goaltending statistics ==
Name	Games	Minutes	Wins	Losses	Ties	Goals against	Saves	Shut outs	SV %	GAA
Victor Östman	11	604	3	6	1	38	348	0	.902	3.77
Matthew Thiessen	8	354	0	5	1	25	180	0	.878	4.23
Empty Net	-	11	-	-	-	5	-	-	-	-
Total	14	971	3	11	2	68	528	0	.886	4.20

== Rankings ==
Poll	Week																					
Poll	Pre	1	2	3	4	5	6	7	8	9	10	11	12	13	14	15	16	17	18	19	20	21 (Final)
USCHO.com	NR	NR	NR	NR	NR	NR	NR	NR	NR	NR	NR	NR	NR	NR	NR	NR	NR	NR	NR	NR	-	NR
USA Today	NR	NR	NR	NR	NR	NR	NR	NR	NR	NR	NR	NR	NR	NR	NR	NR	NR	NR	NR	NR	NR	NR

USCHO did not release a poll in week 20.
