= 2020–21 Providence Friars men's ice hockey season =

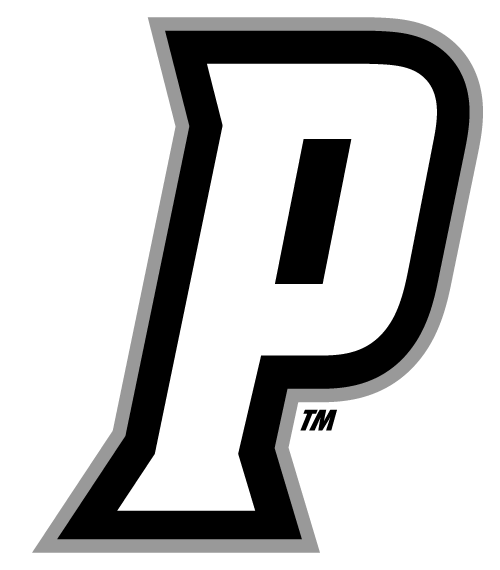
- Conference: 5th Hockey East
- Home ice: Schneider Arena

Rankings
- USCHO: 16
- USA Today: NR

Record
- Overall: 11–9–5
- Conference: 10–8–5–0–0–2
- Home: 5–5–3
- Road: 6–4–2
- Neutral: 0–0–0

Coaches and captains
- Head coach: Nate Leaman
- Assistant coaches: Ron Rolston; Joel Beal; Bruce Irving
- Captain(s): Michael Callahan; Greg Printz; Tyce Thompson

The 2020–21 Providence Friars Men's ice hockey season was the 70th season of play for the program and the 37th season in the Hockey East conference. The Friars represented Providence College and were coached by Nate Leaman, in his 10th season.

== Season ==
As a result of the ongoing COVID-19 pandemic the entire college ice hockey season was delayed. Because the NCAA had previously announced that all winter sports athletes would retain whatever eligibility they possessed through at least the following year, none of Providence's players would lose a season of play. However, the NCAA also approved a change in its transfer regulations that would allow players to transfer and play immediately rather than having to sit out a season, as the rules previously required.

Providence got off to a bad start, surrendering 12 goals in their opening weekend to Boston College. Afterwards, sophomore transfer Jaxson Stauber, son of Hobey Baker-recipient Robb Stauber, took over in net and the team saw immediate improvement. The Friars were able to remain in the top-20 for the remainder of the season but the team was never able to put a consistent string of wins together to get them either into the top-10 or among the best teams in their own conference.

By the end of the regular season Providence was considered a 'bubble team' for the NCAA Tournament and would need a very good performance in the Hockey East Tournament to improve their standing if they couldn't get an automatic bid. The first impediment for the team was Hockey East using a power index to decide conference placement rather than win percentage. This meant that Providence finished below Connecticut despite possessing a better record and would have to play a road game in the quarterfinals. The team was easily able to overcome that difficulty and defeated the Huskies 6–1. Their next opponent, Massachusetts, was not as easily beaten. After a good start, Providence was shut out over the final 50 minutes of play and lost 2–5.

Getting into the semifinal and losing to the eventual conference champion was a solid performance but Providence had a problem. Because there were little-to-no non-conference games for all of college hockey, the PairWise rankings would not be used. Instead, the NCAA selection committee decided to judge teams based upon how they performed against the best teams in their conference. Providence had lost both games to BC, gone 1–1 versus Boston University and 0–2–2 against Massachusetts (including the playoff match). This left the Friars with a 1–5–2 record against the 'good' Hockey East teams, which was not sufficient to earn them a trip to the national tournament.

Kyle Koopman and Jimmy Scannell sat out the season.

== Departures ==
Player	Position	Nationality	Cause
Jack Dugan	Forward	United States	Signed Professional Contract (Vegas Golden Knights)
Jerry Harding	Forward	United States	Transferred to Massachusetts
Shane Kavanagh	Forward	United States	Graduation
Jake Kucharski	Goaltender	United States	Transferred to American International
Michael Lackey	Forward	United States	Graduation (Signed with Orlando Solar Bears)
Caleb Rule	Forward	United States	Transferred to Miami
Vimal Sukumaran	Forward	Canada	Graduation
Spenser Young	Defenseman	United States	Graduation

== Recruiting ==
Player	Position	Nationality	Age	Notes
Jack Adams	Forward	United States	23	Boxford, MA; selected 162nd overall in 2017; transfer from Union
Brett Berard	Forward	United States	23	East Greenwich, RI; selected 134th overall in 2020
Anton Martinsson	Goaltender	Sweden	24	Klippan, SWE; graduate transfer from Alaska
Nicholas Poisson	Forward	Canada	19	Vancouver, BC
Uula Ruikka	Defenseman	Finland	20	Oulu, FIN
Jaxson Stauber	Goaltender	United States	21	Wayzata, MN; transfer from Minnesota State
Matt Tugnutt	Forward	Canada	24	Peterborough, ON; graduate transfer from Sacred Heart
Chase Yoder	Forward	United States	18	Fairview, TX; selected 170th overall in 2020

== Current roster ==
As of February 12, 2021.

No.	Nat.	Player	Class	Pos	Height	Weight	DoB	Hometown	Previous team	NHL rights
1	(United States)	Jimmy Scannell	Junior	G	5' 11" (1.8 m)	170 lb (77 kg)	1999-06-13	Medfield, Massachusetts	Thayer Academy (USHS–MA)	—
2	(United States)	Luke Johnson	Sophomore	D	5' 11" (1.8 m)	175 lb (79 kg)	1999-01-07	Edina, Minnesota	Sioux City Musketeers (USHL)	—
3	(United States)	Davis Bunz	Senior	D	6' 1" (1.85 m)	180 lb (82 kg)	1998-09-04	Middleton, Wisconsin	Central Illinois Flying Aces (USHL)	—
4	(United States)	Jack Adams	Senior	F	6' 6" (1.98 m)	210 lb (95 kg)	1997-02-05	Boxford, Massachusetts	Union (ECAC)	DET, 162nd overall 2017
5	(United States)	Ben Mirageas	Senior	D	6' 1" (1.85 m)	185 lb (84 kg)	1999-05-08	Newburyport, Massachusetts	Chicago Steel (USHL)	NYI, 77th overall 2017
6	(United States)	Cam McDonald	Sophomore	D	5' 9" (1.75 m)	180 lb (82 kg)	2001-02-03	Eagle River, Alaska	Muskegon Lumberjacks (USHL)	—
8	(Sweden)	Albin Nilsson	Sophomore	F	6' 0" (1.83 m)	195 lb (88 kg)	1998-09-18	Ljungby, Sweden	Sioux City Musketeers (USHL)	—
9	(United States)	Patrick Moynihan	Sophomore	F	5' 11" (1.8 m)	190 lb (86 kg)	2001-01-23	Millis, Massachusetts	USNTDP (USHL)	NJD, 158th overall 2019
11	(United States)	Greg Printz	Senior	F	6' 2" (1.88 m)	225 lb (102 kg)	1998-05-04	Fairfax, Virginia	Omaha Lancers (USHL)	—
12	(Canada)	Nick Poisson	Freshman	F	5' 11" (1.8 m)	190 lb (86 kg)	2001-08-15	Vancouver, British Columbia	Prince George Spruce Kings (BCHL)	—
13	(United States)	Craig Needham	Sophomore	F	5' 10" (1.78 m)	185 lb (84 kg)	1999-03-31	Medford, Massachusetts	Youngstown Phantoms (USHL)	—
14	(United States)	Matt Koopman	Junior	F	5' 10" (1.78 m)	175 lb (79 kg)	1998-05-01	Marblehead, Massachusetts	Waterloo Black Hawks (USHL)	—
16	(United States)	Kyle Koopman	Junior	D	5' 11" (1.8 m)	190 lb (86 kg)	1998-05-01	Marblehead, Massachusetts	West Kelowna Warriors (BCHL)	—
17	(United States)	Chase Yoder	Freshman	F	5' 11" (1.8 m)	180 lb (82 kg)	2002-05-28	Fairview, Texas	USNTDP (USHL)	PIT, 170th overall 2020
18	(Canada)	Jamie Engelbert	Sophomore	F	6' 4" (1.93 m)	205 lb (93 kg)	2000-06-21	Cobourg, Ontario	Cobourg Cougars (OJHL)	—
19	(United States)	Jason O'Neill	Senior	F	5' 11" (1.8 m)	190 lb (86 kg)	1997-03-23	Odenton, Maryland	Chicago Steel (USHL)	—
20	(United States)	Parker Ford	Sophomore	F	5' 9" (1.75 m)	185 lb (84 kg)	2000-07-20	Wakefield, Rhode Island	Sioux City Musketeers (USHL)	—
21	(United States)	Brett Berard	Freshman	F	5' 9" (1.75 m)	165 lb (75 kg)	2002-09-09	East Greenwich, Rhode Island	USNTDP (USHL)	NYR, 134th overall 2020
22	(Finland)	Uula Ruikka	Freshman	D	5' 9" (1.75 m)	175 lb (79 kg)	2000-05-28	Oulu, Finland	Chicago Steel (USHL)	—
23	(United States)	Michael Callahan (C)	Junior	D	6' 2" (1.88 m)	205 lb (93 kg)	1999-09-23	Franklin, Massachusetts	Youngstown Phantoms (USHL)	ARI, 142nd overall 2018
24	(Canada)	Max Crozier	Sophomore	D	6' 2" (1.88 m)	195 lb (88 kg)	2000-04-19	Calgary, Alberta	Sioux Falls Stampede (USHL)	TBL, 120th overall 2019
25	(United States)	Luke Perunovich	Junior	D	6' 0" (1.83 m)	180 lb (82 kg)	1997-05-12	Edina, Minnesota	Northeast Generals (NAHL)	—
26	(United States)	John McDermott	Senior	F	6' 2" (1.88 m)	195 lb (88 kg)	1997-05-15	Darien, Connecticut	Tri-City Storm (USHL)	—
27	(United States)	Tyce Thompson	Junior	F	6' 1" (1.85 m)	185 lb (84 kg)	1999-07-12	Milford, Connecticut	Dubuque Fighting Saints (USHL)	NJD, 96th overall 2019
28	(United States)	Garrett Devine	Sophomore	F	6' 1" (1.85 m)	185 lb (84 kg)	1997-11-25	Windsor, Colorado	South Shore Kings (NCDC)	—
29	(Canada)	Matt Tugnutt	Graduate	F	5' 10" (1.78 m)	185 lb (84 kg)	1996-05-14	Peterborough, Ontario	Sacred Heart (AHA)	—
30	(United States)	Jaxson Stauber	Sophomore	G	6' 3" (1.91 m)	175 lb (79 kg)	1999-04-27	Plymouth, Minnesota	Sioux Falls Stampede (USHL)	—
33	(Canada)	Gabe Mollot-Hill	Junior	G	6' 4" (1.93 m)	199 lb (90 kg)	1997-08-12	Ottawa, Ontario	Bloomington Thunder (USHL)	—
35	(Sweden)	Anton Martinsson	Graduate	G	6' 1" (1.85 m)	180 lb (82 kg)	1995-12-11	Klippan, Sweden	Alaska (WCHA)	—

== Standings ==
2020–21 Hockey East Standings
	Conference record										Overall record					
	GP	W	L	T	OTW	OTL	SOW	HEPI	GF	GA	GP	W	L	T	GF	GA
#6 Boston College	21	16	4	1	3	2	0	58.61	82	46	24	17	6	1	91	58
#11 Boston University	14	10	3	1	3	1	1	56.36	49	37	16	10	5	1	52	45
#1 Massachusetts *	22	13	5	4	1	1	1	55.44	76	42	29	20	5	4	103	48
Connecticut	22	10	10	2	1	4	2	52.01	69	63	23	10	11	2	70	69
#16 Providence	23	10	8	5	0	0	2	50.80	63	61	25	11	9	5	71	67
Northeastern	20	9	8	3	1	0	3	49.94	68	60	21	9	9	3	69	64
#19 Massachusetts–Lowell	16	7	8	1	1	1	0	48.00	46	53	20	10	9	1	59	63
Maine	15	3	10	2	0	1	2	46.66	41	61	16	3	11	2	43	68
Merrimack	18	5	11	2	0	1	0	45.38	47	66	18	5	11	2	47	66
New Hampshire	21	5	13	3	3	2	2	43.66	51	83	23	6	14	3	60	88
Vermont	12	1	9	2	0	0	0	38.02	17	37	13	1	10	2	20	42
Championship: March 20, 2021; No Regular Season Champion Awarded * indicates conference tournament champion (Lamoriello Trophy); Rankings: USCHO.com Top 20 Poll

== Schedule and results ==
Date	Time	Opponent^{#}	Rank^{#}	Site	TV	Decision	Result	Attendance	Record
Regular season
December 4	6:00 PM	at #2 Boston College	#12	Conte Forum • Chestnut Hill, Massachusetts	NESN	Mollot-Hill	L 0–3	0	0–1–0 (0–1–0)
December 5	7:00 PM	vs. #2 Boston College	#12	Schneider Arena • Providence, Rhode Island	NESN	Mollot-Hill	L 0–9	0	0–2–0 (0–2–0)
December 13	5:00 PM	at #8 Massachusetts–Lowell	#19	Tsongas Center • Lowell, Massachusetts	NESN+	Stauber	W 4–2	0	1–2–0 (1–2–0)
December 19	1:05 PM	at #12 Northeastern	#19	Matthews Arena • Boston, Massachusetts	NESN	Stauber	T 3–3 ^{SOL}	0	1–2–1 (1–2–1)
December 20	3:36 PM	vs. #12 Northeastern	#19	Schneider Arena • Providence, Rhode Island	NESN	Stauber	W 5–0	0	2–2–1 (2–2–1)
December 28	3:00 PM	at Connecticut	#15	XL Center • Hartford, Connecticut		Stauber	L 0–2	0	2–3–1 (2–3–1)
January 1	1:00 PM	vs. Vermont	#15	Schneider Arena • Providence, Rhode Island	NESN	Stauber	T 0–0 ^{SOW}	0	2–3–2 (2–3–2)
January 2	7:00 PM	vs. Vermont	#15	Schneider Arena • Providence, Rhode Island	NESN	Stauber	W 3–1	0	3–3–2 (3–3–2)
January 8	6:00 PM	at Boston University	#16	Agganis Arena • Boston, Massachusetts	NESN+	Stauber	W 7–3	0	4–3–2 (4–3–2)
January 9	7:00 PM	vs. Boston University	#16	Schneider Arena • Providence, Rhode Island	NESN	Stauber	L 4–6	0	4–4–2 (4–4–2)
January 15	3:30 PM	vs. Maine	#16	Schneider Arena • Providence, Rhode Island	NESN	Stauber	L 3–4	0	4–5–2 (4–5–2)
January 16	4:30 PM	vs. Maine	#16	Schneider Arena • Providence, Rhode Island	NESN	Stauber	W 3–2	0	5–5–2 (5–5–2)
January 22	3:00 PM	at #8 Massachusetts	#18	Mullins Center • Amherst, Massachusetts		Stauber	T 0–0 ^{SOW}	0	5–5–3 (5–5–3)
January 23	3:00 PM	vs. #8 Massachusetts	#18	Schneider Arena • Providence, Rhode Island	NESN+	Stauber	T 1–1 ^{SOL}	0	5–5–4 (5–5–4)
January 29	7:00 PM	at New Hampshire	#17	Whittemore Center • Durham, New Hampshire	NESN	Stauber	W 5–1	0	6–5–4 (6–5–4)
January 31	3:30 PM	vs. New Hampshire	#17	Schneider Arena • Providence, Rhode Island	NESN	Stauber	W 3–2	0	7–5–4 (7–5–4)
February 6	2:05 PM	at Merrimack	#16	J. Thom Lawler Rink • North Andover, Massachusetts		Stauber	W 5–1	0	8–5–4 (8–5–4)
February 7	2:00 PM	vs. Merrimack	#16	Schneider Arena • Providence, Rhode Island		Stauber	L 2–3	0	8–6–4 (8–6–4)
February 12	4:30 PM	vs. #20 Connecticut	#16	Schneider Arena • Providence, Rhode Island	NESN+	Stauber	W 4–0	0	9–6–4 (9–6–4)
February 23	4:30 PM	vs. #9 Massachusetts	#14	Schneider Arena • Providence, Rhode Island		Stauber	L 1–8	0	9–7–4 (9–7–4)
February 27	4:35 PM	at #17 Northeastern	#14	Matthews Arena • Boston, Massachusetts	NESN	Stauber	W 4–2	0	10–7–4 (10–7–4)
February 28	7:00 PM	vs. #17 Northeastern	#14	Schneider Arena • Providence, Rhode Island		Stauber	T 3–3 ^{SOL}	0	10–7–5 (10–7–5)
March 5	5:00 PM	at Connecticut	#15	XL Center • Hartford, Connecticut		Stauber	L 3–5	0	10–8–5 (10–8–5)
Hockey East Tournament
March 14	3:30 PM	at Connecticut*	#17	Mark Edward Freitas Ice Forum • Storrs, Connecticut (Hockey East Quarterfinals)		Stauber	W 6–1	0	11–8–5
March 17	7:00 PM	at #6 Massachusetts*	#14	Mullins Center • Amherst, Massachusetts (Hockey East Semifinals)	NESN	Stauber	L 2–5	0	11–9–5
*Non-conference game. ^{#}Rankings from USCHO.com Poll. All times are in Eastern Time.

== Scoring statistics ==
Name	Position	Games	Goals	Assists	Points	PIM
Tyce Thompson	C	25	11	14	25	16
Parker Ford	C	25	7	12	19	14
Patrick Moynihan	C	17	6	9	15	8
Greg Printz	LW	25	6	9	15	12
Nick Poisson	F	24	5	9	14	23
Michael Callahan	D	25	3	11	14	12
Ben Mirageas	D	25	1	11	12	20
Brett Berard	LW	19	5	5	10	16
Uula Ruikka	D	22	4	4	8	4
Max Crozier	D	17	3	5	8	10
Jason O'Neill	F	25	3	5	8	14
Craig Needham	C	25	3	4	7	2
Matt Koopman	C	22	4	2	6	4
Chase Yoder	F	25	3	3	6	8
Cam McDonald	D	24	1	4	5	8
Matt Tugnutt	C/RW	16	0	5	5	8
John McDermott	LW	15	1	3	4	2
Davis Bunz	D	25	1	3	4	8
Jamie Engelbert	C	23	3	0	3	23
Albin Nilsson	C	12	1	0	1	4
Luke Johnson	D	17	0	1	1	6
Anton Martinsson	G	1	0	0	0	0
Gabe Mollot-Hill	G	2	0	0	0	0
Garrett Devine	F	6	0	0	0	4
Jack Adams	C/RW	6	0	0	0	0
Luke Perunovich	D	10	0	0	0	4
Jaxson Stauber	G	23	0	0	0	0
Bench	-	-	-	-	-	4
Total			71	119	190	234

== Goaltending statistics ==
Name	Games	Minutes	Wins	Losses	Ties	Goals against	Saves	Shut outs	SV %	GAA
Jaxson Stauber	23	1393	11	7	5	52	567	4	.916	2.24
Gabe Mollot-Hill	2	107	0	2	0	8	44	0	.846	4.47
Anton Martinsson	1	10	0	0	0	3	3	0	.500	16.82
Empty Net	-	13	-	-	-	4	-	-	-	-
Total	25	1525	11	9	5	67	614	4	.902	2.64

== Rankings ==
Poll	Week																					
Poll	Pre	1	2	3	4	5	6	7	8	9	10	11	12	13	14	15	16	17	18	19	20	21 (Final)
USCHO.com	17	15	13	12	19	19	15	15	16	16	18	17	16	16	15	14	15	17	14	16	-	16
USA Today	NR	15	13	12	NR	NR	13	NR	NR	NR	NR	NR	NR	NR	NR	NR	NR	NR	14	NR	NR	NR

USCHO did not release a poll in week 20.

== Awards and honors ==
Player	Award	Ref
Tyce Thompson	Hockey East Second Team	

== Players drafted into the NHL ==
=== 2021 NHL entry draft ===
Round	Pick	Player	NHL team
3	91	Taige Harding^{†}	Chicago Blackhawks
4	101	Guillaume Richard^{†}	Washington Capitals

† incoming freshman
