= 2020–21 UMass Lowell River Hawks men's ice hockey season =

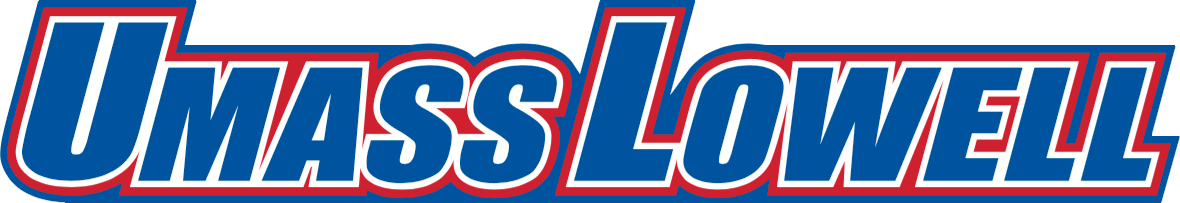
- Conference: 7th Hockey East
- Home ice: Tsongas Center

Rankings
- USCHO: 19
- USA Today: NR

Record
- Overall: 10–9–1
- Conference: 7–8–1–1–1–0
- Home: 4–5–1
- Road: 6–4–0
- Neutral: 0–0–0

Coaches and captains
- Head coach: Norm Bazin
- Assistant coaches: Andy Jones; Juliano Pagliero; Tom Ford
- Captain(s): Charles Levesque; Connor Sodergren
- Alternate captain: Lucas Condotta

The 2020–21 UMass Lowell River Hawks men's ice hockey season was the 54th season of play for the program, the 38th season competing at the Division I level, and the 37th season in the Hockey East conference. The River Hawks represented the University of Massachusetts Lowell (UML) and were coached by Norm Bazin, in his 10th season.

== Season ==
As a result of the ongoing COVID-19 pandemic the entire college ice hockey season was delayed. Because the NCAA had previously announced that all winter sports athletes would retain whatever eligibility they possessed through at least the following year, none of UML's players would lose a season of play. However, the NCAA also approved a change in its transfer regulations that would allow players to transfer and play immediately rather than having to sit out a season, as the rules previously required.

UML was heavily impacted by COVID-19 early in the season. After a delayed start, the team played just four games in the first two months of the campaign. Entering their game with UMass on 29 January, Lowell had played just four games while the Minutemen had competed in 17. The lack of playing time appeared to hurt the River Hawks since the team, which had been highly ranked entering the season, swiftly fell out of the top 20. UML appeared to regain its form by the end of the regular season, but by then their only path into the NCAA tournament was with a conference championship. The River Hawks won their first postseason game without much difficulty and entered the quarterfinals having to beat Boston University to stay alive. Despite being on a four-game unbeaten streak, Owen Savory was replaced as the starting goaltender by freshman Henry Welsch and the move paid off. While he only faced 17 shots in the game, Welsch turned aside all but one and helped UML advance to the semifinals. Here the team's run was expected to end as they faced the top ranked team in the nation, Boston College (BC). The Eagles built a three-goal lead after two periods and looked to be sailing into the championship, but the River Hawks' offense awoke in the third, scoring three times to tie the game. Less than two minutes later, however, BC was again in the lead with a power play goal. Welsch was pulled for an extra attacker and in less than a minute UML had again tied the score. It took another 34 minutes of game time for the winning goal to be scored and UML's Matt Brown netted the biggest goal for the River Hawks all season.

Lowell faced off against Massachusetts for the Hockey East championship. Welsch continued his strong play but the Minutemen defense was stifling, allowed the Hawks only 16 shots on goal, none of which found the back of the net. UML has to settle for second place but the team had redeemed itself for an otherwise disappointing campaign.

Ben McEvoy sat out the season.

== Departures ==
Player	Position	Nationality	Cause
Eric Green	Goaltender	United States	Left program
Kenny Hausinger	Forward	United States	Graduation
Cale List	Defenseman	Canada	Transferred to Norwich
Colin O'Neill	Forward	United States	Graduation
Derek Osik	Forward	United States	Transferred to Long Island
Chris Schutz	Forward	United States	Graduation (Signed with Tulsa Oilers)
Tyler Wall	Goaltender	Canada	Graduation (Signed with New York Rangers)

== Recruiting ==
Player	Position	Nationality	Age	Notes
Matt Allen	Forward	United States	20	Minco, OK
Nik Armstrong-Kingcade	Forward	United States	21	Rostock, GER
Brehdan Engum	Defenseman	United States	20	Burnsville, MN
Matt Kinash	Forward	Canada	20	Edmonton, AB
Josh Latta	Forward	Canada	22	West Vancouver, BC; transfer from Alabama–Huntsville
Ben Meehan	Defenseman	United States	21	Walpole, MA; Selected 140th overall in 2020
Owen Savory	Goaltender	Canada	22	Cambridge, ON; transfer from Rensselaer
Jackson Sterrett	Defenseman	United States	21	Hendersonville, TN
Henry Welsch	Goaltender	United States	19	Lakeville, MN

== Roster ==
As of February 12, 2021

No.	Nat.	Player	Class	Pos	Height	Weight	DoB	Hometown	Previous team	NHL rights
1	(United States)	Logan Neaton	Sophomore	G	6' 4" (1.93 m)	205 lb (93 kg)	1999-04-07	Brighton, Michigan	Prince George Spruce Kings (BCHL)	WPG, 144th overall 2019
2	(United States)	Dominick Procopio	Junior	D	6' 2" (1.88 m)	195 lb (88 kg)	1997-06-11	Grosse Pointe, Michigan	Shreveport Mudbugs (NAHL)	—
4	(United States)	Sam Knoblauch	Junior	F	6' 1" (1.85 m)	195 lb (88 kg)	1998-02-15	Rochester, Michigan	Carleton Place Canadians (CCHL)	—
5	(United States)	Chase Blackmun	Junior	D	6' 0" (1.83 m)	200 lb (91 kg)	1999-04-02	Hudson, Wisconsin	Cedar Rapids RoughRiders (USHL)	—
7	(Canada)	Jordan Schulting	Sophomore	D	6' 2" (1.88 m)	190 lb (86 kg)	1999-08-06	Penticton, British Columbia	Coquitlam Express (BCHL)	—
8	(United States)	Nik Armstrong-Kingkade	Freshman	F	5' 9" (1.75 m)	185 lb (84 kg)	1999-05-01	Alexandria, Virginia	Minot Minotauros (NAHL)	—
9	(Canada)	Reid Stefanson	Junior	F	6' 0" (1.83 m)	185 lb (84 kg)	1997-02-20	Winnipeg, Manitoba	Sioux Falls Stampede (USHL)	—
10	(United States)	Matt Brown	Sophomore	F	5' 9" (1.75 m)	190 lb (86 kg)	1999-08-09	Wood-Ridge, New Jersey	Des Moines Buccaneers (USHL)	—
11	(United States)	Jon McDonald	Junior	D	6' 0" (1.83 m)	180 lb (82 kg)	1998-06-15	Livonia, Michigan	Fargo Force (USHL)	—
12	(Canada)	Charlie Levesque (C)	Senior	F	5' 10" (1.78 m)	175 lb (79 kg)	1998-05-29	Russell, Ontario	Hawkesbury Hawks (CCHL)	—
13	(United States)	Austin O'Rourke	Junior	F	6' 4" (1.93 m)	211 lb (96 kg)	1997-08-17	Canton, Georgia	Amarillo Bulls (NAHL)	—
14	(United States)	Ben Meehan	Freshman	D	6' 0" (1.83 m)	190 lb (86 kg)	2001-04-20	Walpole, Massachusetts	Cedar Rapids RoughRiders (USHL)	LAK, 140th overall 2020
15	(United States)	Jackson Sterrett	Freshman	F	5' 11" (1.8 m)	183 lb (83 kg)	1999-06-24	Hendersonville, Tennessee	Maryland Black Bears (NAHL)	—
16	(Canada)	Josh Latta	Sophomore	F	5' 11" (1.8 m)	180 lb (82 kg)	1998-08-14	West Vancouver, British Columbia	Alabama Huntsville (WCHA)	—
17	(Slovakia)	Marek Korenčík	Sophomore	D	6' 3" (1.91 m)	200 lb (91 kg)	1999-07-19	Žilina, Slovakia	Luleå J20 (J20 SuperElit)	—
18	(Sweden)	Carl Berglund	Sophomore	F	6' 2" (1.88 m)	195 lb (88 kg)	2000-01-16	Hammarö, Sweden	Sioux Falls Stampede (USHL)	—
19	(Canada)	Anthony Baxter	Senior	D	6' 0" (1.83 m)	185 lb (84 kg)	1997-11-26	Oakville, Ontario	Burlington Cougars (OJHL)	—
20	(United States)	Matt Allen	Freshman	F	5' 10" (1.78 m)	168 lb (76 kg)	2000-05-13	Minco, Oklahoma	Amarillo Bulls (NAHL)	—
21	(United States)	Brian Chambers	Sophomore	F	6' 1" (1.85 m)	180 lb (82 kg)	1998-07-24	Weymouth, Massachusetts	Sioux Falls Stampede (USHL)	—
22	(Canada)	Blake Wells	Sophomore	F	6' 2" (1.88 m)	200 lb (91 kg)	1999-08-02	Blackie, Alberta	Okotoks Oilers (AJHL)	—
23	(Canada)	Zach Kaiser	Sophomore	F	6' 1" (1.85 m)	180 lb (82 kg)	1998-09-06	Orangeville, Ontario	Sherwood Park Crusaders (AJHL)	—
24	(Canada)	Lucas Condotta (A)	Junior	F	6' 2" (1.88 m)	209 lb (95 kg)	1997-11-06	Georgetown, Ontario	Markham Royals (OJHL)	—
25	(United States)	Nolan Sawchuk	Junior	D	5' 11" (1.8 m)	180 lb (82 kg)	1997-09-25	Burnsville, Minnesota	Minot Minotauros (NAHL)	—
26	(Sweden)	Andre Lee	Sophomore	F	6' 4" (1.93 m)	205 lb (93 kg)	2000-07-26	Karlstad, Sweden	Sioux Falls Stampede (USHL)	LAK, 188th overall 2019
27	(Canada)	Seth Barton	Junior	D	6' 3" (1.91 m)	185 lb (84 kg)	1999-08-18	Kelowna, British Columbia	Trail Smoke Eaters (BCHL)	DET, 81st overall 2018
28	(United States)	Connor Sodergren (C)	Senior	F	5' 11" (1.8 m)	190 lb (86 kg)	1996-09-11	Tewksbury, Massachusetts	West Kelowna Warriors (BCHL)	—
29	(Canada)	Matt Kinash	Freshman	F	6' 0" (1.83 m)	185 lb (84 kg)	1999-12-15	Edmonton, Alberta	Drayton Valley Thunder (AJHL)	—
30	(United States)	Benjamin McEvoy	Senior	G	6' 5" (1.96 m)	215 lb (98 kg)	1998-10-13	Dunstable, Massachusetts	Groton-Dunstable High School (USHS–MA)	—
31	(Canada)	Owen Savory	Junior	G	6' 0" (1.83 m)	185 lb (84 kg)	1997-10-11	Cambridge, Ontario	Rensselaer (ECAC)	—
33	(United States)	Henry Welsch	Freshman	G	6' 2" (1.88 m)	195 lb (88 kg)	2000-11-17	Lakeville, Minnesota	Aberdeen Wings (NAHL)	—
37	(United States)	Brehdan Engum	Freshman	D	6' 2" (1.88 m)	215 lb (98 kg)	2000-08-10	Burnsville, Minnesota	Waterloo Black Hawks (USHL)	—

== Standings ==
2020–21 Hockey East Standings
	Conference record										Overall record					
	GP	W	L	T	OTW	OTL	SOW	HEPI	GF	GA	GP	W	L	T	GF	GA
#6 Boston College	21	16	4	1	3	2	0	58.61	82	46	24	17	6	1	91	58
#11 Boston University	14	10	3	1	3	1	1	56.36	49	37	16	10	5	1	52	45
#1 Massachusetts *	22	13	5	4	1	1	1	55.44	76	42	29	20	5	4	103	48
Connecticut	22	10	10	2	1	4	2	52.01	69	63	23	10	11	2	70	69
#16 Providence	23	10	8	5	0	0	2	50.80	63	61	25	11	9	5	71	67
Northeastern	20	9	8	3	1	0	3	49.94	68	60	21	9	9	3	69	64
#19 Massachusetts–Lowell	16	7	8	1	1	1	0	48.00	46	53	20	10	9	1	59	63
Maine	15	3	10	2	0	1	2	46.66	41	61	16	3	11	2	43	68
Merrimack	18	5	11	2	0	1	0	45.38	47	66	18	5	11	2	47	66
New Hampshire	21	5	13	3	3	2	2	43.66	51	83	23	6	14	3	60	88
Vermont	12	1	9	2	0	0	0	38.02	17	37	13	1	10	2	20	42
Championship: March 20, 2021; No Regular Season Champion Awarded * indicates conference tournament champion (Lamoriello Trophy); Rankings: USCHO.com Top 20 Poll

== Schedule and results ==
Date	Time	Opponent^{#}	Rank^{#}	Site	TV	Decision	Result	Attendance	Record
Regular season
December 13	5:00 p.m.	vs. #19 Providence	#8	Tsongas Center • Lowell, Massachusetts	NESN+	Neaton	L 2–4	0	0–1–0 (0–1–0)
December 21	5:00 p.m.	at Connecticut	#17	XL Center • Hartford, Connecticut		Welsch	W 2–1	0	1–1–0 (1–1–0)
January 3	6:00 p.m.	vs. Maine	#17	Tsongas Center • Lowell, Massachusetts		Welsch	W 5–3	0	2–1–0 (2–1–0)
January 4	3:00 p.m.	vs. Maine	#15	Tsongas Center • Lowell, Massachusetts		Savory	W 9–5	0	3–1–0 (3–1–0)
January 29	8:00 p.m.	at #10 Massachusetts	#16	Mullins Center • Amherst, Massachusetts		Savory	L 0–5	0	3–2–0 (3–2–0)
January 30	7:00 p.m.	vs. #10 Massachusetts	#16	Tsongas Center • Lowell, Massachusetts		Welsch	L 1–2	0	3–3–0 (3–3–0)
February 5	6:00 p.m.	vs. New Hampshire	#20	Tsongas Center • Lowell, Massachusetts		Welsch	L 1–2	0	3–4–0 (3–4–0)
February 6	5:00 p.m.	at New Hampshire	#20	Whittemore Center • Durham, New Hampshire		Savory	L 6–7 ^{OT}	0	3–5–0 (3–5–0)
February 9	5:00 p.m.	vs. #20 Connecticut		Tsongas Center • Lowell, Massachusetts	NESN	Welsch	W 3–2 ^{OT}	0	4–5–0 (4–5–0)
February 12	7:00 p.m.	at #1 Boston College		Conte Forum • Chestnut Hill, Massachusetts	NESN+	Welsch	L 1–7	0	4–6–0 (4–6–0)
February 13	6:00 p.m.	vs. #1 Boston College		Tsongas Center • Lowell, Massachusetts		Savory	L 3–4	0	4–7–0 (4–7–0)
February 19	7:05 p.m.	at #16 Northeastern		Matthews Arena • Boston, Massachusetts	NESN	Welsch	W 4–1	0	5–7–0 (5–7–0)
February 20	6:00 p.m.	vs. #16 Northeastern		Tsongas Center • Lowell, Massachusetts		Welsch	L 0–4	0	5–8–0 (5–8–0)
February 26	7:00 p.m.	at Vermont		Gutterson Fieldhouse • Burlington, Vermont		Savory	W 3–1	0	6–8–0 (6–8–0)
February 27	7:00 p.m.	at Vermont		Gutterson Fieldhouse • Burlington, Vermont		Savory	W 3–2	0	7–8–0 (7–8–0)
March 6	3:00 p.m.	vs. #10 Boston University		Tsongas Center • Lowell, Massachusetts		Savory	T 3–3 ^{SOL}	0	7–8–1 (7–8–1)
Hockey East tournament
March 10	7:00 p.m.	vs. Vermont*		Tsongas Center • Lowell, Massachusetts (Hockey East Opening Round)	NESN	Savory	W 5–3	0	8–8–1
March 14	1:05 p.m.	at #9 Boston University*		Agganis Arena • Boston, Massachusetts (Hockey East Quarterfinals)	NESN+	Welsch	W 2–1	0	9–8–1
March 17	4:30 p.m.	at #1 Boston College*		Conte Forum • Chestnut Hill, Massachusetts (Hockey East Semifinals)	NESN	Welsch	W 6–5 ^{2OT}	0	10–8–1
March 20	7:03 p.m.	at #6 Massachusetts*		Mullins Center • Amherst, Massachusetts (Hockey East Championship)		Welsch	L 0–1	0	10–9–1
*Non-conference game. ^{#}Rankings from USCHO.com Poll. All times are in Eastern Time.

== Scoring statistics ==
Name	Position	Games	Goals	Assists	Points	PIM
Andre Lee	C/LW	20	7	9	16	18
Reid Stefanson	LW	19	5	10	15	4
Matt Brown	LW	19	8	5	13	10
Charlie Levesque	C	20	6	6	12	2
Chase Blackmun	D	19	6	5	11	8
Carl Berglund	C/RW	11	3	8	11	2
Seth Barton	D	20	2	9	11	4
Lucas Condotta	F	20	6	4	10	14
Jon McDonald	D	17	0	8	8	4
Ben Meehan	D	17	0	8	8	27
Zach Kaiser	C/LW	20	4	2	6	2
Connor Sodergren	F	18	2	4	6	2
Anthony Baxter	D	16	3	2	5	25
Brian Chambers	RW	18	3	2	5	4
Jordan Schulting	D	6	1	3	4	4
Blake Wells	F	12	1	3	4	4
Nolan Sawchuk	D	15	1	2	3	8
Matt Allen	F	5	0	3	3	0
Nik Armstrong-Kingkade	F	18	1	1	2	4
Dominik Procopio	D	2	0	1	1	0
Josh Latta	F	9	0	1	1	4
Brehdan Engum	D	12	0	1	1	10
Sam Knoblauch	RW	15	0	1	1	4
Marek Korenčík	D	17	0	1	1	4
Jackson Sterrett	F	2	0	0	0	0
Matt Kinash	F	2	0	0	0	0
Logan Neaton	G	3	0	0	0	0
Owen Savory	G	8	0	0	0	0
Austin O'Rourke	F	11	0	0	0	2
Henry Welsch	G	12	0	0	0	0
Bench	-	-	-	-	-	6
Total			59	99	158	186

== Goaltending statistics ==
Name	Games	Minutes	Wins	Losses	Ties	Goals against	Saves	Shut-outs	SV %	GAA
Henry Welsch	12	686	6	5	0	29	258	0	.899	2.54
Owen Savory	8	447	4	3	1	25	137	0	.846	3.35
Logan Neaton	3	99	0	1	0	8	47	0	.855	4.85
Empty Net	-	8	-	-	-	1	-	-	-	-
Total	20	1241	10	9	1	63	442	0	.875	3.05

== Rankings ==
Poll	Week																					
Poll	Pre	1	2	3	4	5	6	7	8	9	10	11	12	13	14	15	16	17	18	19	20	21 (Final)
USCHO.com	11	12	11	10	8	15	17	17	15	15	15	16	20	NR	NR	NR	NR	NR	NR	19	-	19
USA Today	11	12	12	10	9	15	NR	NR	13	15	NR	NR	NR	NR	NR	NR	NR	NR	NR	NR	NR	NR

USCHO did not release a poll in week 20.
