= 2020–21 Northeastern Huskies men's ice hockey season =

- Conference: 6th Hockey East
- Home ice: Matthews Arena

Rankings
- USCHO.com: NR
- USA Today/ US Hockey Magazine: NR

Record
- Overall: 9–9–3
- Conference: 9–8–3
- Home: 4–5–1
- Road: 5–4–2
- Neutral: 0–0–0

Coaches and captains
- Head coach: Jim Madigan
- Assistant coaches: Jerry Keefe; Mike McLaughlin; Ed Walsh
- Captain: Zach Solow
- Alternate captain(s): Jordan Harris; Collin Murphy; Austin Goldstein; Grant Jozefek

The 2020–21 Northeastern Huskies Men's ice hockey season was the 89th season of play for the program and the 37th season in the Hockey East conference. The Huskies represented Northeastern University and were coached by Jim Madigan, in his 10th season.

== Season ==
As a result of the ongoing COVID-19 pandemic the entire college ice hockey season was delayed. Because the NCAA had previously announced that all winter sports athletes would retain whatever eligibility they possessed through at least the following year, none of Northeastern's players would lose a season of play. However, the NCAA also approved a change in its transfer regulations that would allow players to transfer and play immediately rather than having to sit out a season, as the rules previously required.

The Huskies' season began even later than most of their contemporaries, with the first game coming in mid-December. Northeastern was unable to establish any kind of consistency all season with one exception; when NEU played a ranked team, they wouldn't win. The Huskies went 0–7–2 against top-20 opponents during the season and 9–2–1 versus all others. The team's lack of success in such games would lead them to be dropped from the rankings for the first time all season after their early exit from the Hockey East Tournament. With no ranking, a .500 record and a low PairWise score, Northeastern had no real chance to be selected for the NCAA Tournament.

Billy Carrabino, Devon Levi and Nick Scarpa sat out the season.

== Departures ==
Player	Position	Nationality	Cause
Matt Filipe	Forward	United States	Graduation (Signed with Boston Bruins)
Biagio Lerario	Forward	United States	Graduation (Signed with Manitoba Moose)
Tyler Madden	Forward	United States	Signed Professional Contract (Los Angeles Kings)
Craig Pantano	Goaltender	United States	Graduation (Signed with South Carolina Stingrays)
John Picking	Forward	United States	Graduation
Ryan Shea	Defenseman	United States	Graduation (Signed with Dallas Stars)
Matt Thomson	Forward	United States	Left program
Brendan van Riemsdyk	Forward	United States	Graduation (Signed with Knoxville Ice Bears)
A. J. Villella	Defenseman	United States	Transferred to Bentley

== Recruiting ==
Player	Position	Nationality	Age	Notes
Steven Agriogianis	Forward	United States	21	East Hanover, NJ
Marco Bozzo	Forward	Canada	23	Woodbridge, ON; transfer from Massachusetts
Sam Colangelo	Forward	United States	18	Stoneham, MA; 36th selection in the 2020 NHL entry draft
James Davenport	Defenseman	United States	20	Natick, MA
Johnny DeRoche	Forward	United States	22	Lynnfield, MA; transfer from Vermont
Gunnarwolfe Fontaine	Forward	United States	20	Providence, RI; 202nd selection in the 2020 NHL entry draft
Dylan Jackson	Forward	Canada	19	Oakville, ON
Ty Jackson	Forward	Canada	19	Oakville, ON
Devon Levi	Goaltender	Canada	22	Montréal, QC; 212th selection in the 2020 NHL entry draft
Michael Outzen	Forward	United States	21	Lone Tree, CO

== Roster ==
As of September 2, 2020.

No.	Nat.	Player	Class	Pos	Height	Weight	DoB	Hometown	Previous team	NHL rights
1	(United States)	Nick Scarpa	Junior	G	5' 7" (1.7 m)	150 lb (68 kg)	1997-01-23	Andover, Massachusetts	Valley Jr. Warriors (EHL)	—
2	(United States)	Jordan Harris (A)	Junior	D	5' 11" (1.8 m)	185 lb (84 kg)	2000-07-07	Haverhill, Massachusetts	Kimball Union Academy (USHS–NH)	MTL, 71st overall 2018
3	(United States)	Jayden Struble	Sophomore	D	6' 0" (1.83 m)	205 lb (93 kg)	2001-09-08	Cumberland, Rhode Island	Saint Sebastian's School (USHS–MA)	MTL, 46th overall 2019
4	(Canada)	Jérémie Bucheler	Sophomore	D	6' 4" (1.93 m)	200 lb (91 kg)	2000-03-31	Saint-Laurent, Quebec	Victoria Grizzlies (BCHL)	—
6	(United States)	Collin Murphy (A)	Senior	D	6' 3" (1.91 m)	205 lb (93 kg)	1998-11-27	Wilmington, Massachusetts	Muskegon Lumberjacks (USHL)	—
7	(United States)	Michael Outzen	Freshman	F	6' 0" (1.83 m)	185 lb (84 kg)	1999-07-29	Lone Tree, Colorado	New Jersey Titans (NAHL)	—
8	(United States)	Julian Kislin	Junior	D	6' 0" (1.83 m)	190 lb (86 kg)	1999-05-24	Manalapan, New Jersey	Youngstown Phantoms (USHL)	—
9	(United States)	Johnny DeRoche	Junior	D	5' 10" (1.78 m)	185 lb (84 kg)	1998-06-23	Lynnfield, Massachusetts	Vermont (HEA)	—
10	(Canada)	Dylan Jackson	Freshman	D	5' 10" (1.78 m)	185 lb (84 kg)	2001-09-06	Oakville, Ontario	Dubuque Fighting Saints (USHL)	—
11	(United States)	Gunnarwolfe Fontaine	Freshman	F	5' 10" (1.78 m)	175 lb (79 kg)	2000-09-16	East Greenwich, Rhode Island	Chicago Steel (USHL)	NSH, 202nd overall 2020
12	(United States)	Austin Goldstein (A)	Junior	F	5' 9" (1.75 m)	165 lb (75 kg)	1997-02-05	Reading, Massachusetts	Islanders Hockey Club (USPHL)	—
13	(United States)	T. J. Walsh	Sophomore	F	5' 9" (1.75 m)	165 lb (75 kg)	2000-04-29	Shrewsbury, Massachusetts	Des Moines Buccaneers (USHL)	—
14	(Canada)	Ty Jackson	Freshman	F	5' 8" (1.73 m)	160 lb (73 kg)	2001-09-06	Oakville, Ontario	Dubuque Fighting Saints (USHL)	—
15	(United States)	Grant Jozefek (A)	Senior (RS)	F	5' 10" (1.78 m)	185 lb (84 kg)	1997-10-25	Chester, New Jersey	Lincoln Stars (USHL)	—
16	(United States)	Sam Colangelo	Freshman	F	6' 2" (1.88 m)	208 lb (94 kg)	2001-12-26	Stoneham, Massachusetts	Chicago Steel (USHL)	ANA, 36th overall 2020
17	(Canada)	Marco Bozzo	Junior	F	5' 11" (1.8 m)	185 lb (84 kg)	1996-11-22	Woodbridge, Ontario	Massachusetts (HEA)	—
18	(Canada)	Tyler Spott	Sophomore	D	5' 11" (1.8 m)	170 lb (77 kg)	2000-06-17	Toronto, Ontario	Green Bay Gamblers (USHL)	—
19	(United States)	Riley Hughes	Sophomore	F	6' 2" (1.88 m)	175 lb (79 kg)	2000-06-27	Westwood, Massachusetts	Victoria Grizzlies (BCHL)	NYR, 216th overall 2018
20	(United States)	Alex Mella	Sophomore	F	6' 0" (1.83 m)	195 lb (88 kg)	1999-02-21	Stamford, Connecticut	Madison Capitols (USHL)	—
21	(United States)	Matt DeMelis	Sophomore	F	6' 0" (1.83 m)	185 lb (84 kg)	1999-06-02	Hingham, Massachusetts	Youngstown Phantoms (USHL)	—
22	(United States)	Billy Carrabino	Senior	D	6' 1" (1.85 m)	195 lb (88 kg)	1997-03-20	Scottsdale, Arizona	Boston Junior Bruins (USPHL)	—
23	(United States)	Michael Kesselring	Sophomore	D	6' 4" (1.93 m)	205 lb (93 kg)	2000-01-13	New Hampton, New Hampshire	Fargo Force (USHL)	EDM, 164th overall 2018
24	(United States)	Steven Agriogianis	Freshman	F	5' 9" (1.75 m)	170 lb (77 kg)	1999-01-07	East Hanover, New Jersey	Nanaimo Clippers (BCHL)	—
25	(United States)	Aidan McDonough	Sophomore	F	6' 2" (1.88 m)	200 lb (91 kg)	1999-11-06	Milton, Massachusetts	Cedar Rapids RoughRiders (USHL)	VAN, 195th overall 2019
26	(United States)	James Davenport	Freshman	D	5' 11" (1.8 m)	185 lb (84 kg)	2000-05-01	Natick, Massachusetts	Victoria Grizzlies (BCHL)	—
27	(United States)	Neil Shea	Sophomore	F	6' 1" (1.85 m)	200 lb (91 kg)	1999-07-29	Marshfield, Massachusetts	Chicago Steel (USHL)	—
28	(United States)	Zach Solow (C)	Senior	F	5' 9" (1.75 m)	175 lb (79 kg)	1998-11-06	Naples, Florida	Dubuque Fighting Saints (USHL)	—
30	(United States)	Curtis Frye	Senior (RS)	G	6' 3" (1.91 m)	215 lb (98 kg)	1995-07-25	Northwood, New Hampshire	Philadelphia Jr. Flyers (USPHL)	—
31	(United States)	Connor Murphy	Sophomore	G	6' 4" (1.93 m)	200 lb (91 kg)	1998-09-01	Hudson Falls, New York	Carleton Place Canadians (CCHL)	—
33	(Canada)	Devon Levi	Freshman	G	6' 0" (1.83 m)	185 lb (84 kg)	2001-12-27	Dollard-des-Ormeaux, Quebec	Carleton Place Canadians (CCHL)	FLA, 212th overall 2020

== Standings ==
2020–21 Hockey East Standings
	Conference record										Overall record					
	GP	W	L	T	OTW	OTL	SOW	HEPI	GF	GA	GP	W	L	T	GF	GA
#6 Boston College	21	16	4	1	3	2	0	58.61	82	46	24	17	6	1	91	58
#11 Boston University	14	10	3	1	3	1	1	56.36	49	37	16	10	5	1	52	45
#1 Massachusetts *	22	13	5	4	1	1	1	55.44	76	42	29	20	5	4	103	48
Connecticut	22	10	10	2	1	4	2	52.01	69	63	23	10	11	2	70	69
#16 Providence	23	10	8	5	0	0	2	50.80	63	61	25	11	9	5	71	67
Northeastern	20	9	8	3	1	0	3	49.94	68	60	21	9	9	3	69	64
#19 Massachusetts–Lowell	16	7	8	1	1	1	0	48.00	46	53	20	10	9	1	59	63
Maine	15	3	10	2	0	1	2	46.66	41	61	16	3	11	2	43	68
Merrimack	18	5	11	2	0	1	0	45.38	47	66	18	5	11	2	47	66
New Hampshire	21	5	13	3	3	2	2	43.66	51	83	23	6	14	3	60	88
Vermont	12	1	9	2	0	0	0	38.02	17	37	13	1	10	2	20	42
Championship: March 20, 2021; No Regular Season Champion Awarded * indicates conference tournament champion (Lamoriello Trophy); Rankings: USCHO.com Top 20 Poll

== Schedule and results ==
Date	Time	Opponent^{#}	Rank^{#}	Site	TV	Decision	Result	Attendance	Record
Regular season
December 12	6:05 PM	vs. Merrimack	#17	Matthews Arena • Boston, Massachusetts	NESN	Murphy	W 8–2	0	1–0–0 (1–0–0)
December 13	4:05 PM	at Merrimack	#17	J. Thom Lawler Rink • North Andover, Massachusetts		Murphy	W 6–3	0	2–0–0 (2–0–0)
December 19	1:05 PM	vs. #19 Providence	#12	Matthews Arena • Boston, Massachusetts	NESN	Murphy	T 3–3 ^{SOW}	0	2–0–1 (2–0–1)
December 20	3:30 PM	at #19 Providence	#12	Schneider Arena • Providence, Rhode Island	NESN	Murphy	L 0–5	0	2–1–1 (2–1–1)
December 26	7:00 PM	at Vermont	#12	Gutterson Fieldhouse • Burlington, Vermont		Murphy	W 4–1	0	3–1–1 (3–1–1)
December 27	7:00 PM	at Vermont	#12	Gutterson Fieldhouse • Burlington, Vermont		Murphy	T 2–2 ^{SOW}	0	3–1–2 (3–1–2)
January 1	7:05 PM	vs. #9 Massachusetts	#13	Matthews Arena • Boston, Massachusetts	NESN	Murphy	L 3–4	0	3–2–2 (3–2–2)
January 2	6:00 PM	at #9 Massachusetts	#13	Mullins Center • Amherst, Massachusetts	NESN+	Murphy	L 3–5	0	3–3–2 (3–3–2)
January 9	7:05 PM	at Merrimack	#14	Matthews Arena • Boston, Massachusetts		Murphy	W 3–2 ^{OT}	0	4–3–2 (4–3–2)
January 10	3:05 PM	at Merrimack	#14	J. Thom Lawler Rink • North Andover, Massachusetts	NESN	Murphy	W 3–2	0	5–3–2 (5–3–2)
January 13	6:05 PM	vs. New Hampshire	#14	Matthews Arena • Boston, Massachusetts	NESN	Murphy	W 7–0	0	6–3–2 (6–3–2)
February 2	7:05 PM	vs. #1 Boston College	#14	Matthews Arena • Boston, Massachusetts	NESN+	Murphy	L 2–6	0	6–4–2 (6–4–2)
February 5	5:05 PM	vs. Connecticut	#14	Matthews Arena • Boston, Massachusetts		Murphy	L 1–4	0	6–5–2 (6–5–2)
February 12	7:00 PM	at New Hampshire	#18	Whittemore Center • Durham, New Hampshire		Murphy	W 6–2	0	7–5–2 (7–5–2)
February 13	6:05 PM	vs. New Hampshire	#18	Matthews Arena • Boston, Massachusetts	NESN+	Murphy	W 5–4	0	8–5–2 (8–5–2)
February 19	7:05 PM	vs. Massachusetts–Lowell	#16	Matthews Arena • Boston, Massachusetts	NESN	Murphy	L 1–4	0	8–6–2 (8–6–2)
February 20	6:00 PM	at Massachusetts–Lowell	#16	Tsongas Center • Lowell, Massachusetts		Murphy	W 4–0	0	9–6–2 (9–6–2)
February 27	4:35 PM	vs. #14 Providence	#17	Matthews Arena • Boston, Massachusetts	NESN	Murphy	L 2–4	0	9–7–2 (9–7–2)
February 28	7:00 PM	at #14 Providence	#17	Schneider Arena • Providence, Rhode Island		Murphy	T 3–3 ^{SOW}	0	9–7–3 (9–7–3)
March 5	5:00 PM	at #2 Boston College	#18	Conte Forum • Chestnut Hill, Massachusetts		Murphy	L 2–4	0	9–8–3 (9–8–3)
Hockey East Tournament
March 14	4:30 PM	at #7 Massachusetts	#20	Mullins Center • Amherst, Massachusetts (Quarterfinal)	NESN+	Murphy	L 1–4	0	9–9–3
*Non-conference game. ^{#}Rankings from USCHO.com Poll. All times are in Eastern Time.

== Scoring statistics ==
Name	Position	Games	Goals	Assists	Points	PIM
Zach Solow	C	21	11	13	24	30
Aiden McDonough	LW	21	10	10	20	4
Jordan Harris	D	19	6	13	19	8
Gunnarwolfe Fontaine	LW	21	6	9	15	29
Grant Jozefek	RW	21	3	12	15	16
Dylan Jackson	RW	21	5	9	14	8
Ty Jackson	C	21	7	5	12	16
Jayden Struble	F	18	2	10	12	33
Riley Hughes	RW	21	6	4	10	4
Mike Kesselring	D	20	5	3	8	23
Tyler Spott	D	18	2	6	8	2
Matt Demelis	F	21	2	5	7	6
Steven Agriogianis	RW	11	2	4	6	14
Julian Kislin	D	21	0	5	5	10
Sam Colangelo	C/RW	8	0	3	3	2
T. J. Walsh	LW	15	0	3	3	2
Jérémie Bucheler	D	14	1	1	2	4
Johnny DeRoche	F	10	0	2	2	0
Marco Bozzo	C	16	0	2	2	2
Connor Murphy	G	21	0	2	2	0
Neil Shea	F	16	1	0	1	2
James Davenport	D	12	0	1	1	4
Austin Goldstein	F	20	0	1	1	12
Curtis Frye	G	1	0	0	0	0
Alex Mella	LW	1	0	0	0	2
Collin Murphy	D	4	0	0	0	0
Michael Outzen	F	8	0	0	0	4
Bench	-	-	-	-	-	10
Total			69	123	192	243

== Goaltending statistics ==
Name	Games	Minutes	Wins	Losses	Ties	Goals against	Saves	Shut outs	SV %	GAA
Connor Murphy	21	1255	9	9	3	57	632	2	.910	2.72
Curtis Frye	1	15	0	0	0	2	7	0	.778	7.83
Empty Net	-	6	-	-	-	5	-	-	-	-
Total	21	1277	9	9	3	64	582	2	.901	3.01

== Rankings ==
Poll	Week																					
Poll	Pre	1	2	3	4	5	6	7	8	9	10	11	12	13	14	15	16	17	18	19	20	21 (Final)
USCHO.com	19	18	16	15	17	12	12	13	14	14	13	14	14	18	16	17	18	20	NR	NR	-	NR
USA Today	NR	NR	NR	15	14	10	11	10	15	13	13	12	14	NR	NR	NR	NR	NR	NR	NR	NR	NR

USCHO did not release a poll in week 20.

== Awards and honors ==
Player	Award	Ref
Aidan McDonough	Hockey East Three-Stars Award	
Jordan Harris	Hockey East Second Team	
Zach Solow	Hockey East Second Team	
Gunnarwolfe Fontaine	Hockey East Rookie Team	
