= 2020–21 UConn Huskies men's ice hockey season =

- Conference: 4th Hockey East
- Home ice: XL Center; Mark Edward Freitas Ice Forum

Rankings
- USCHO: NR
- USA Today: NR

Record
- Overall: 10–11–2
- Conference: 10–10–2
- Home: 6–6–1
- Road: 4–5–1
- Neutral: 0–0–0

Coaches and captains
- Head coach: Mike Cavanaugh
- Assistant coaches: Joe Pereira; Tyler Helton; Vince Stalletti; Joe Ferriss; Will Moran
- Captain: Adam Karashik
- Alternate captain(s): Brian Rigali; Zac Robbins; Carter Turnbull

The 2020–21 UConn Huskies men's ice hockey season was the 61st season of play for the program, the 23rd at the Division I level, and the 7th season in the Hockey East conference. The Huskies represented the University of Connecticut and were coached by Mike Cavanaugh, in his 8th season.

== Season ==
As a result of the ongoing COVID-19 pandemic the entire college ice hockey season was delayed. Because the NCAA had previously announced that all winter sports athletes would retain whatever eligibility they possessed through at least the following year, none of Connecticut's players would lose a season of play. However, the NCAA also approved a change in its transfer regulations that would allow players to transfer and play immediately rather than having to sit out a season, as the rules previously required.

UConn began the season going through a gauntlet or ranked teams. The stiff competition handed the Huskies a 1–4–1 record and left the team with wallowing near the bottom of the conference standings. Despite the bad start, Connecticut turned its season around with a solid performance in January. While facing a slightly easier schedule, the Huskies ended the month a game over .500 and, after defeating Northeastern at the start of February, the team found itself in the top-20. The ranking didn't last long, however, and Connecticut's 4-game losing streak nearly ended any hope for the team. Winning the last two games of the regular season put the Huskies at .500 and, because Hockey East used a power index for ranking for the 2021 season, UConn finished 4th in the conference, the best result to date.

In spite of their mediocre record, Connecticut had a small chance to receive an at-large bid to the NCAA Tournament but it would need a good performance to make itself stand out from the other 'bubble teams'. They got a good chance in the conference quarterfinals, facing Providence at home. The Huskies started slow and were badly outshot in the first period. When they did finally score the Friars had already built a 3-goal lead and their opponents cruised to a 6–1 victory.

Darion Hanson, Ryan Keane, Matt Pasquale, and Bradley Stone sat out the season.

== Departures ==
Player	Position	Nationality	Cause
Ben Freeman	Forward	United States	Graduation (Signed with Wheeling Nailers)
Justin Howell	Forward	United States	Graduation
Ruslan Iskhakov	Forward	Russia	Signed professional contract (HC TPS)
Wyatt Newpower	Defenseman	United States	Graduation (Signed with Cleveland Monsters)
Alexandre Payusov	Forward	Canada	Graduation
Jordan Timmons	Forward	United States	Transferred to Robert Morris

== Recruiting ==
Player	Position	Nationality	Age	Notes
Cassidy Bowes	Forward	Canada	21	Kelowna, BC
Nick Capone	Forward	United States	18	East Haven, CT; selected 157th overall in 2020
Darion Hanson	Goaltender	United States	23	East Bethel, MN; transfer from Union
Gavin Puskar	Forward	United States	19	Westfield, NJ
Hudson Schandor	Forward	Canada	19	North Vancouver, BC
Artem Shlaine	Goaltender	United States	19	Moscow, RUS; selected 130th overall in 2020
John Spetz	Defenseman	United States	20	Oak Ridge, NJ
Ryan Tverberg	Forward	Canada	18	Richmond Hill, ON; selected 213th overall in 2020

== Roster ==
As of February 12, 2021.

No.	Nat.	Player	Class	Pos	Height	Weight	DoB	Hometown	Previous team	NHL rights
1	(United States)	Ryan Keane	Sophomore	G	5' 9" (1.75 m)	160 lb (73 kg)	1998-03-15	Lewisville, Texas	Jamestown Rebels (NAHL)	—
2	(Russia)	Yan Kuznetsov	Sophomore	D	6' 4" (1.93 m)	215 lb (98 kg)	2002-03-21	Murmansk, Russia	Sioux Falls Stampede (USHL)	CGY, 50th overall 2020
3	(United States)	Adam Karashik (C)	Senior	D	6' 0" (1.83 m)	200 lb (91 kg)	1998-01-15	Ridgefield, Connecticut	Chicago Steel (USHL)	—
4	(United States)	Roman Kinal	Junior	D	6' 2" (1.88 m)	190 lb (86 kg)	1998-07-20	Waterford, Michigan	Dubuque Fighting Saints (USHL)	—
5	(United States)	Eric Linell	Sophomore	F	5' 8" (1.73 m)	165 lb (75 kg)	1998-09-17	Great Neck, New York	Penticton Vees (BCHL)	—
6	(United States)	Ryan Wheeler	Junior	D	6' 0" (1.83 m)	190 lb (86 kg)	1997-08-24	Lancaster, New York	New Jersey Titans (NAHL)	—
7	(Canada)	Jonny Evans	Junior	F	5' 9" (1.75 m)	170 lb (77 kg)	1997-05-01	North Delta, British Columbia	Powell River Kings (BCHL)	—
8	(Canada)	Carter Turnbull (A)	Junior	F	5' 8" (1.73 m)	180 lb (82 kg)	1998-09-08	Nanaimo, British Columbia	Powell River Kings (BCHL)	—
9	(Canada)	Cassidy Bowes	Freshman	F	5' 10" (1.78 m)	185 lb (84 kg)	1999-02-17	Sturgeon County, Alberta	Whitecourt Wolverines (AJHL)	—
10	(Russia)	Vladislav Firstov	Sophomore	F	6' 1" (1.85 m)	185 lb (84 kg)	2001-06-19	Yaroslavl, Russia	Waterloo Black Hawks (USHL)	MIN, 42nd overall 2019
11	(Czech Republic)	Jáchym Kondelík	Junior	F	6' 5" (1.96 m)	225 lb (102 kg)	1999-12-21	Budějovice, Czech Republic	Muskegon Lumberjacks (USHL)	NSH, 111th overall 2018
12	(United States)	Gavin Puskar	Freshman	F	6' 2" (1.88 m)	180 lb (82 kg)	2001-06-21	Farmington, Connecticut	Hotchkiss School (USHS–CT)	—
13	(United States)	John Wojciechowski	Junior	F	6' 3" (1.91 m)	210 lb (95 kg)	1998-02-18	Mamaroneck, New York	Langley Rivermen (BCHL)	—
14	(United States)	Zac Robbins (A)	Senior	F	5' 10" (1.78 m)	180 lb (82 kg)	1996-10-03	Glenview, Illinois	Cedar Rapids Roughriders (USHL)	—
16	(United States)	Jake Flynn	Sophomore	D	6' 0" (1.83 m)	180 lb (82 kg)	2001-05-26	Bridgewater, Massachusetts	Thayer Academy (USHS–MA)	—
17	(United States)	Marc Gatcomb	Junior	F	6' 2" (1.88 m)	195 lb (88 kg)	1999-07-22	Woburn, Massachusetts	The Gunnery (USHS–CT)	—
18	(United States)	John Spetz	Freshman	D	5' 10" (1.78 m)	195 lb (88 kg)	1999-12-01	Oak Ridge, New Jersey	Chicago Steel (USHL)	—
19	(United States)	Brian Rigali (A)	Senior	F	5' 8" (1.73 m)	185 lb (84 kg)	1997-03-08	Libertyville, Illinois	Sioux City Musketeers (USHL)	—
21	(United States)	Nick Capone	Freshman	F	6' 2" (1.88 m)	205 lb (93 kg)	2001-12-17	East Haven, Connecticut	Tri-City Storm (USHL)	TBL, 157th overall 2020
22	(Canada)	Hudson Schandor	Freshman	F	5' 8" (1.73 m)	165 lb (75 kg)	2000-09-29	North Vancouver, British Columbia	Surrey Eagles (BCHL)	—
23	(Canada)	Carter Berger	Sophomore	D	6' 0" (1.83 m)	195 lb (88 kg)	1999-09-17	North Vancouver, British Columbia	Victoria Grizzlies (BCHL)	FLA, 106th overall 2019
27	(Canada)	Harrison Rees	Sophomore	D	6' 2" (1.88 m)	175 lb (79 kg)	2000-03-19	Mississauga, Ontario	North York Rangers (OJHL)	—
28	(Canada)	Ryan Tverberg	Freshman	F	5' 11" (1.8 m)	180 lb (82 kg)	2002-01-30	Richmond Hill, Ontario	Toronto Jr. Canadiens (OJHL)	TOR, 213th overall 2020
29	(Canada)	Kale Howarth	Junior	F	6' 4" (1.93 m)	215 lb (98 kg)	1997-06-10	Red Deer, Alberta	Trail Smoke Eaters (BCHL)	CBJ, 148th overall 2017
31	(United States)	Matt Pasquale	Freshman (RS)	G	6' 2" (1.88 m)	190 lb (86 kg)	2000-10-06	North Reading, Massachusetts	Northeast Generals (NAHL)	—
32	(Russia)	Artem Shlaine	Freshman	F	6' 1" (1.85 m)	175 lb (79 kg)	2002-03-17	Moscow, Russia	Shattuck-Saint Mary's (USHS–MN)	NJD, 130th overall 2020
33	(Czech Republic)	Tomáš Vomáčka	Junior	G	6' 3" (1.91 m)	190 lb (86 kg)	1999-05-02	Trutnov, Czech Republic	Lincoln Stars (USHL)	NSH, 154th overall 2017
35	(England)	Bradley Stone	Senior	G	6' 1" (1.85 m)	195 lb (88 kg)	1996-07-14	London, England	Boston Junior Bruins (USPHL)	—

== Standings ==
2020–21 Hockey East Standings
	Conference record										Overall record					
	GP	W	L	T	OTW	OTL	SOW	HEPI	GF	GA	GP	W	L	T	GF	GA
#6 Boston College	21	16	4	1	3	2	0	58.61	82	46	24	17	6	1	91	58
#11 Boston University	14	10	3	1	3	1	1	56.36	49	37	16	10	5	1	52	45
#1 Massachusetts *	22	13	5	4	1	1	1	55.44	76	42	29	20	5	4	103	48
Connecticut	22	10	10	2	1	4	2	52.01	69	63	23	10	11	2	70	69
#16 Providence	23	10	8	5	0	0	2	50.80	63	61	25	11	9	5	71	67
Northeastern	20	9	8	3	1	0	3	49.94	68	60	21	9	9	3	69	64
#19 Massachusetts–Lowell	16	7	8	1	1	1	0	48.00	46	53	20	10	9	1	59	63
Maine	15	3	10	2	0	1	2	46.66	41	61	16	3	11	2	43	68
Merrimack	18	5	11	2	0	1	0	45.38	47	66	18	5	11	2	47	66
New Hampshire	21	5	13	3	3	2	2	43.66	51	83	23	6	14	3	60	88
Vermont	12	1	9	2	0	0	0	38.02	17	37	13	1	10	2	20	42
Championship: March 20, 2021; No Regular Season Champion Awarded * indicates conference tournament champion (Lamoriello Trophy); Rankings: USCHO.com Top 20 Poll

== Schedule and results ==
Date	Time	Opponent^{#}	Rank^{#}	Site	TV	Decision	Result	Attendance	Record
Regular season
November 20	6:00 PM	at #7 Massachusetts		Mullins Center • Amherst, Massachusetts	NESN+	Vomáčka	L 1–5	0	0–1–0 (0–1–0)
November 21	4:00 PM	vs. #7 Massachusetts		XL Center • Hartford, Connecticut		Vomáčka	T 2–2 ^{SOW}	0	0–1–1 (0–1–1)
December 11	6:00 PM	at #2 Boston College		Conte Forum • Chestnut Hill, Massachusetts	NESN	Vomáčka	L 3–4 ^{OT}	0	0–2–1 (0–2–1)
December 12	3:35 PM	vs. #2 Boston College		XL Center • Hartford, Connecticut		Vomáčka	W 3–1	0	1–2–1 (1–2–1)
December 21	5:00 PM	vs. #17 Massachusetts–Lowell		XL Center • Hartford, Connecticut		Vomáčka	L 1–2	0	1–3–1 (1–3–1)
December 23	3:30 PM	at #10 Massachusetts		Mullins Center • Amherst, Massachusetts	NESN	Vomáčka	L 2–6	0	1–4–1 (1–4–1)
December 28	3:00 PM	vs. #15 Providence		XL Center • Hartford, Connecticut		Vomáčka	W 2–0	0	2–4–1 (2–4–1)
January 1	4:00 PM	at New Hampshire		Whittemore Center • Durham, New Hampshire	NESN	Vomáčka	W 2–1	0	3–4–1 (3–4–1)
January 2	4:00 PM	vs. New Hampshire		XL Center • Hartford, Connecticut		Vomáčka	L 1–2 ^{OT}	0	3–5–1 (3–5–1)
January 15	4:00 PM	vs. New Hampshire		Mark Edward Freitas Ice Forum • Storrs, Connecticut		Vomáčka	W 6–5 ^{OT}	0	4–5–1 (4–5–1)
January 16	5:00 PM	at New Hampshire		Whittemore Center • Durham, New Hampshire		Vomáčka	W 8–3	0	5–5–1 (5–5–1)
January 22	4:00 PM	vs. #1 Boston College		Conte Forum • Chestnut Hill, Massachusetts		Vomáčka	T 3–3 ^{SOW}	0	5–5–2 (5–5–2)
January 23	4:00 PM	vs. #1 Boston College		Mark Edward Freitas Ice Forum • Storrs, Connecticut		Vomáčka	L 2–4	0	5–6–2 (5–6–2)
January 29	3:05 PM	at Merrimack		J. Thom Lawler Rink • North Andover, Massachusetts		Vomáčka	W 6–1	0	6–6–2 (6–6–2)
January 30	3:00 PM	vs. Merrimack		Mark Edward Freitas Ice Forum • Storrs, Connecticut		Vomáčka	W 6–2	0	7–6–2 (7–6–2)
February 5	5:05 PM	at #14 Northeastern		Matthews Arena • Boston, Massachusetts		Vomáčka	W 4–1	0	8–6–2 (8–6–2)
February 9	5:00 PM	at Massachusetts–Lowell	#20	Tsongas Center • Lowell, Massachusetts	NESN	Vomáčka	L 2–3 ^{OT}	0	8–7–2 (8–7–2)
February 12	4:30 PM	at #16 Providence	#20	Schneider Arena • Providence, Rhode Island	NESN+	Vomáčka	L 0–4	0	8–8–2 (8–8–2)
February 20	4:00 PM	vs. #11 Boston University		Mark Edward Freitas Ice Forum • Storrs, Connecticut		Vomáčka	L 2–3 ^{OT}	0	8–9–2 (8–9–2)
February 26	4:00 PM	vs. Maine		Mark Edward Freitas Ice Forum • Storrs, Connecticut		Vomáčka	L 4–6	0	8–10–2 (8–10–2)
February 27	4:00 PM	vs. Maine		Mark Edward Freitas Ice Forum • Storrs, Connecticut		Vomáčka	W 4–2	0	9–10–2 (9–10–2)
March 5	5:00 PM	vs. #15 Providence		XL Center • Hartford, Connecticut		Vomáčka	W 5–3	0	10–10–2 (10–10–2)
Hockey East Tournament
March 14	3:30 PM	vs. #17 Providence*		Mark Edward Freitas Ice Forum • Storrs, Connecticut		Vomáčka	L 1–6	0	10–11–2
*Non-conference game. ^{#}Rankings from USCHO.com Poll. All times are in Eastern Time.

== Scoring statistics ==
Name	Position	Games	Goals	Assists	Points	PIM
Jonny Evans	F	23	14	15	29	12
Jáchym Kondelík	C	23	4	18	22	6
Hudson Schandor	C	22	6	8	14	10
Carter Turnbull	RW	23	9	4	13	10
Marc Gatcomb	F	23	6	6	12	14
Vladislav Firstov	LW	13	3	9	12	12
John Spetz	D	22	3	8	11	10
Carter Berger	D	21	1	8	9	6
Adam Karashik	D	23	1	8	9	27
Artem Shlaine	C	23	1	8	9	16
Kale Howarth	LW/C	18	5	2	7	27
Ryan Tverberg	C	14	4	3	7	16
Roman Kinal	D	16	1	5	6	0
Yan Kuznetsov	D	16	1	5	6	4
Jake Flynn	D	23	1	5	6	12
Brian Rigali	F	23	3	2	5	16
Harrison Rees	D	21	2	3	5	8
Nick Capone	RW	20	1	4	5	8
Cassidy Bowes	LW	11	1	2	3	6
Ryan Wheeler	D	18	2	0	2	8
Zac Robbins	F	23	0	2	2	2
Eric Linell	G	14	1	0	1	0
John Wojciechowski	C	1	0	0	0	0
Gavin Puskar	C	3	0	0	0	0
Tomáš Vomáčka	G	23	0	0	0	2
Bench	-	-	-	-	-	6
Total			70	125	195	238

== Goaltending statistics ==
Name	Games	Minutes	Wins	Losses	Ties	Goals against	Saves	Shut outs	SV %	GAA
Tomáš Vomáčka	23	1393	10	11	2	66	659	1	.909	2.84
Empty Net	-	7	-	-	-	3	-	-	-	-
Total	23	1400	10	11	2	69	659	1	.905	2.96

== Rankings ==
Poll	Week																					
Poll	Pre	1	2	3	4	5	6	7	8	9	10	11	12	13	14	15	16	17	18	19	20	21 (Final)
USCHO.com	NR	NR	NR	NR	NR	NR	NR	NR	NR	NR	NR	NR	NR	20	NR	NR	NR	NR	NR	NR	-	NR
USA Today	NR	NR	NR	NR	NR	NR	NR	NR	NR	NR	NR	NR	NR	15	NR	NR	NR	NR	NR	NR	NR	NR

USCHO did not release a poll in week 20.

== Awards and honors ==
Player	Award	Ref
Jonny Evans	AHCA East Second Team All-American	
Jonny Evans	Hockey East Scoring Champion	
Jonny Evans	Hockey East Three-Stars Award	
Jonny Evans	Hockey East First Team	
Tomáš Vomáčka	Hockey East Third Team	
Jáchym Kondelík	Hockey East Third Team	

== Players drafted into the NHL ==
=== 2021 NHL entry draft ===
Round	Pick	Player	NHL team
7	205	Arsenii Sergeev^{†}	Calgary Flames

† incoming freshman
