= Drew Commesso =

American ice hockey player (born 2002)

- Born: July 19, 2002 (age 24) Norwell, Massachusetts, U.S.
- Height: 6 ft 2 in (188 cm)
- Weight: 181 lb (82 kg; 12 st 13 lb)
- Position: Goaltender
- Catches: Left
- NHL team: Chicago Blackhawks
- National team: United States
- NHL draft: 46th overall, 2020; Chicago Blackhawks
- Playing career: 2022–present

Drew Commesso (born July 19, 2002) is an American professional ice hockey player who is a goaltender for the Chicago Blackhawks of the National Hockey League (NHL). He was selected by the Blackhawks in the second round, 46th overall, of the 2020 NHL entry draft.

== Playing career ==
=== Youth ===
Commesso competed for the USA Hockey National Team Development Program.

=== College ===
Commesso played for the Boston University Terriers, where he was the starting goaltender. He was selected in the second round by the Chicago Blackhawks in the 2020 NHL entry draft.

=== Professional ===
Commesso joined the Rockford IceHogs, Chicago's American Hockey League (AHL) affiliate, in 2023. He made his first career AHL start on October 13 in a 7–2 victory over the San Jose Barracuda. Commesso led the IceHogs in almost every goaltending statistic during his first year in the AHL. He finished the season with an 18–16–3–1 record, along with a 2.65 goals-against average and a .906 save percentage.

On December 12, 2024, Commesso made his NHL debut, entering in relief of starter Arvid Söderblom midway through the third period after Söderblom allowed a fifth goal to the host New York Islanders. Commesso faced two shots and did not allow a goal. On December 14, Commesso made his first NHL start against the New Jersey Devils. He made 20 saves in a 4-1 loss.

Commesso returned to the NHL on January 9, 2026, having been called up from the AHL after both Arvid Söderblom and Spencer Knight fell ill. On January 10, 2026, Commesso achieved his first shutout at the NHL level in a game against the Nashville Predators, with the Chicago Blackhawks winning 3–0. This match marked only his fourth appearance in an NHL game.

== International play ==
Commesso competed in the 2022 Winter Olympics, where he became the youngest starting goaltender in United States history. In his debut against China, he earned a shutout while recording 29 saves.

Commesso was also on the roster at the 2019 IIHF World U18 Championships, 2021 IIHF World Championship, 2022 World Junior Ice Hockey Championships, and 2023 IIHF World Championship.

== Career statistics ==
=== Regular season and playoffs ===
			Regular season									Playoffs
Season	Team	League	GP	W	L	OT	MIN	GA	SO	GAA	SV%	GP	W	L	MIN	GA	SO	GAA	SV%
2016–17	Saint Sebastian's School	USHS	8	—	—	—	—	—	—	1.77	.932	—	—	—	—	—	—	—	—
2017–18	Saint Sebastian's School	USHS	21	—	—	—	—	—	—	2.13	.918	—	—	—	—	—	—	—	—
2018–19	U.S. National Development Team	USHL	24	5	12	4	1259	73	1	3.48	.889	2	0	1	—	—	0	8.41	.731
2019–20	U.S. National Development Team	USHL	11	8	2	0	628	21	2	2.01	.917	—	—	—	—	—	—	—	—
2020–21	Boston University	HE	11	6	3	1	641	32	0	2.99	.915	—	—	—	—	—	—	—	—
2021–22	Boston University	HE	28	13	11	3	1595	67	1	2.52	.914	—	—	—	—	—	—	—	—
2022–23	Boston University	HE	34	24	8	0	1925	79	2	2.46	.913	—	—	—	—	—	—	—	—
2023–24	Rockford IceHogs	AHL	38	18	16	4	2218	98	2	2.65	.906	3	1	2	187	8	0	2.57	.915
2024–25	Rockford IceHogs	AHL	39	18	15	4	2268	96	4	2.54	.911	7	4	3	409	8	0	2.35	.926
2024–25	Chicago Blackhawks	NHL	2	0	1	0	71	4	0	3.36	.846	—	—	—	—	—	—	—	—
2025–26	Rockford IceHogs	AHL	37	13	20	2	2082	107	1	3.08	.901	—	—	—	—	—	—	—	—
2025–26	Chicago Blackhawks	NHL	3	2	1	0	182	7	1	2.31	.918	—	—	—	—	—	—	—	—
NHL totals			5	2	2	0	253	11	1	2.61	.901	—	—	—	—	—	—	—	—

=== International ===
Year	Team	Event	Result	GP	W	L	T	MIN	GA	SO	GAA	SV%
2018	United States	U17	8th	4	1	3	0	243	10	0	2.47	.899
2022	United States	OG	5th	2	2	0	0	120	2	1	1.00	.964
2023	United States	WC	4th	1	1	0	0	12	0	0	0.00	1.000
Junior totals				4	1	3	0	243	10	0	2.47	.899
Senior totals				3	3	0	0	132	2	1	0.91	.967
