= Mark Edward Freitas Ice Forum =

Hockey arena in Connecticut

Coordinates: 41°48′0″N 72°15′17″W

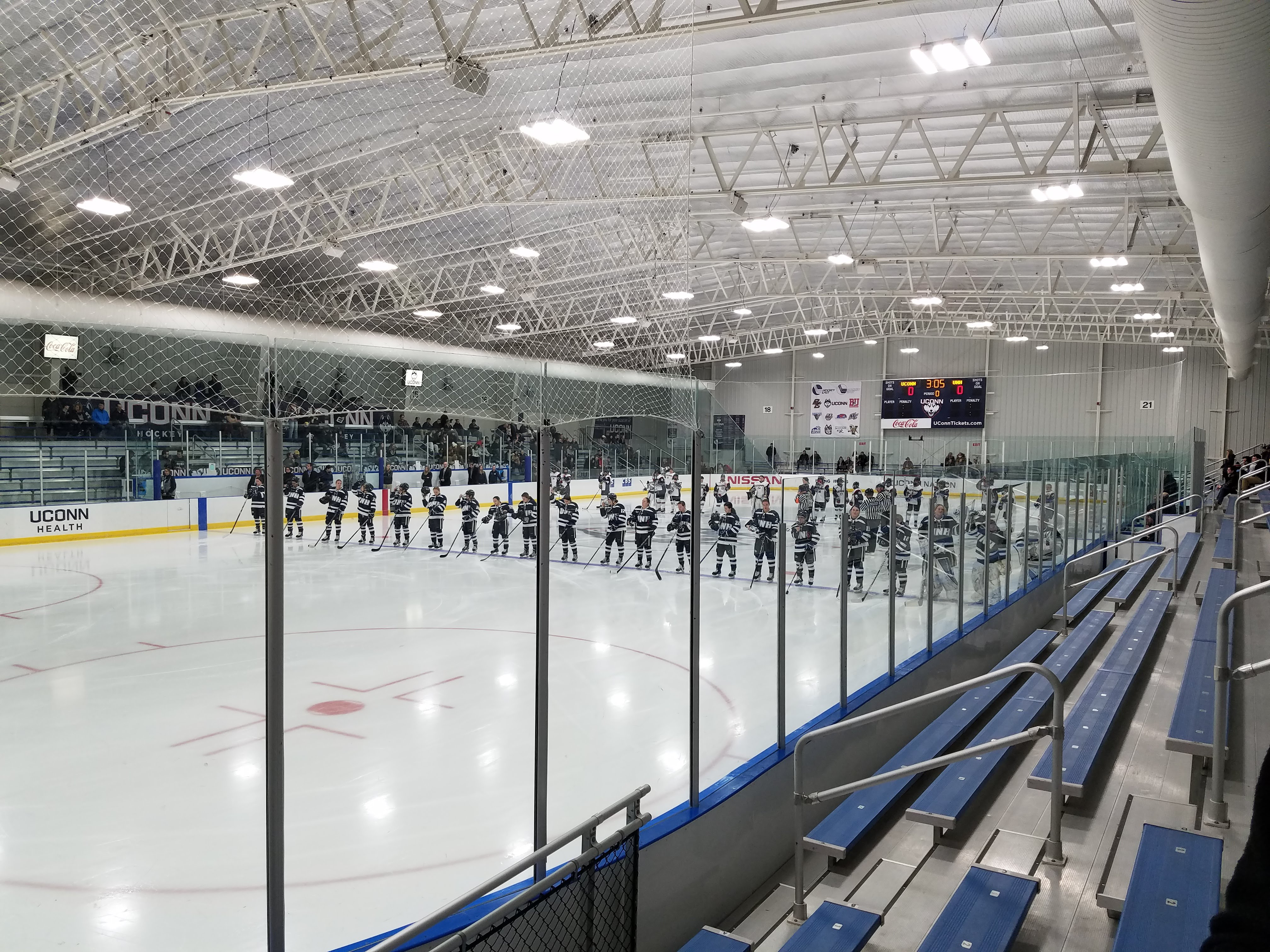
- Interactive map of Mark Edward Freitas Ice Forum
- Former names: UConn Ice Arena
- Location: Storrs, Connecticut
- Owner: University of Connecticut
- Operator: University of Connecticut
- Capacity: 2,000 (hockey)
- Surface: 200' x 85' (ice arena)

Construction
- Groundbreaking: 1996
- Opened: November 7, 1998

Tenants
- UConn Huskies men's ice hockey (1998-2016, 2020-2021); UConn Huskies women's ice hockey (2000–2022); E.O. Smith/Tolland Bucks (High School); Northeast Junior Ice Dogs (Youth Hockey)

Mark Edward Freitas Ice Forum was a 2,000-seat hockey rink in Storrs, Connecticut. It was the longtime home arena and recent practice facility for the University of Connecticut women's and men's college ice hockey teams.

Freitas Ice Forum opened on November 7, 1998, replacing the outdoor UConn Ice Arena, which was in use since the 1960s. Its construction was a part of the UCONN 2000 commitment by the State of Connecticut to help rebuild, renew, and enhance the campuses of the University of Connecticut, paired with the hockey teams' elevation to Division I status. The arena was used for the 2000 MAAC Championship (won by UConn), the 2001 MAAC tournament, and the 2002 ECAC women's hockey tournament. It hosted the 2008 Hockey East Women's Tournament. The building was named for Mark E. Freitas '81, a former hockey letter winner and benefactor, on February 5, 2005.

The men's hockey team used the venue for home games until 2014 when they joined the Hockey East conference. Upon joining the conference, the team played in the PeoplesBank Arena in Hartford, Connecticut. For the duration of the 2020–21 season, the men's team reverted to using the Forum due to the COVID-19 pandemic.

The women's hockey team played in the Forum until 2022. In 2023, the team moved to the 2,600-seat on-campus Toscano Family Ice Forum that also now hosts the men's team. While initially used as a practice facility for the varsity teams and the home ice of its club hockey teams following the move, in 2024 the forum was converted for use as the home facility for the UConn volleyball teams. Until then, volleyball had been played in Harry A. Gampel Pavilion during the basketball off-season.
