= List of UMass Minutemen ice hockey seasons =

This is a season-by-season list of records compiled by the University of Massachusetts Amherst men's ice hockey team.

UMass has reached the Frozen Four twice in school history, both times advancing to the NCAA Championship game. In 2019 they were the runners up to the Minnesota–Duluth Bulldogs and then won the championship over the St. Cloud State Huskies in 2021.

== Season-by-season results ==
Note: GP = Games played, W = Wins, L = Losses, T = Ties

NCAA D-I Champions	NCAA Frozen Four	Conference regular season champions	Conference Division Champions	Conference Playoff Champions

Season	Conference	Regular season (Note: Code explanation; GP—Games Played, W—Wins, L—Losses, T—Tied games, 3/SW—Win in 3 on 3 overtime or shootout, Pts—Points*)														Conference Tournament Results	National Tournament Results
Season	Conference	Conference									Overall					Conference Tournament Results	National Tournament Results
Season	Conference	GP	W	L	T	OTW	OTL	3/SW	Pts*	Finish	GP	W	L	T	%	Conference Tournament Results	National Tournament Results
No Coach (1908–1917)
1908–09	Independent	–	–	–	–	–	–	–	–	–	6	2	4	0	.333		
1909–10	Independent	–	–	–	–	–	–	–	–	–	7	4	3	0	.571		
1910–11	Independent	–	–	–	–	–	–	–	–	–	9	7	2	0	.778		
1911–12	Independent	–	–	–	–	–	–	–	–	–	8	6	1	1	.813		
1912–13	Independent	–	–	–	–	–	–	–	–	–	6	3	3	0	.500		
1913–14	Independent	–	–	–	–	–	–	–	–	–	8	6	2	0	.750		
1914–15	Independent	–	–	–	–	–	–	–	–	–	10	5	5	0	.500		
1915–16	Independent	–	–	–	–	–	–	–	–	–	7	3	4	0	.429		
1916–17	Independent	–	–	–	–	–	–	–	–	–	8	3	3	2	.500		
Elton J. Mansell (1917–1922)
1917–18	Independent	–	–	–	–	–	–	–	–	–	8	5	2	1	.688		
1918–19	Independent	–	–	–	–	–	–	–	–	–	3	1	0	2	.667		
1919–20	Independent	–	–	–	–	–	–	–	–	–	5	3	2	0	.600		
1920–21	Independent	–	–	–	–	–	–	–	–	–	7	3	4	0	.429		
1921–22	Independent	–	–	–	–	–	–	–	–	–	11	6	5	0	.545		
Herbert Collins (1922–1923)
1922–23	Independent	–	–	–	–	–	–	–	–	–	9	3	4	2	.444		
Howard R. Gordon (1923–1924)
1923–24	Independent	–	–	–	–	–	–	–	–	–	9	3	6	0	.333		
Lorin Ball (1924–1939)
1924–25	Independent	–	–	–	–	–	–	–	–	–	7	2	5	0	.286		
1925–26	Independent	–	–	–	–	–	–	–	–	–	8	3	4	1	.438		
1926–27	Independent	–	–	–	–	–	–	–	–	–	7	2	4	1	.357		
1927–28	Independent	–	–	–	–	–	–	–	–	–	6	0	6	0	.000		
1928–29	Independent	–	–	–	–	–	–	–	–	–	12	7	5	0	.583		
1929–30	Independent	–	–	–	–	–	–	–	–	–	11	7	4	0	.636		
1930–31	Independent	–	–	–	–	–	–	–	–	–	13	9	4	0	.692		
1931–32	Independent	–	–	–	–	–	–	–	–	–	4	3	1	0	.750		
1932–33	Independent	–	–	–	–	–	–	–	–	–	8	5	2	1	.688		
1933–34	Independent	–	–	–	–	–	–	–	–	–	8	0	8	0	.000		
1934–35	Independent	–	–	–	–	–	–	–	–	–	7	3	3	1	.500		
1935–36	Independent	–	–	–	–	–	–	–	–	–	6	1	4	1	.250		
1936–37	Independent	–	–	–	–	–	–	–	–	–	6	3	3	0	.500		
1937–38	Independent	–	–	–	–	–	–	–	–	–	7	2	4	1	.357		
1938–39	Independent	–	–	–	–	–	–	–	–	–	5	0	4	1	.556		
Program suspended
Thomas Filmore (1947–1949)
1947–48	Independent	–	–	–	–	–	–	–	–	–	2	0	2	0	.000		
1948–49	Independent	–	–	–	–	–	–	–	–	–	3	0	3	0	.000		
Walter Fitzgerald (1949–1950)
1949–50	Independent	–	–	–	–	–	–	–	–	–	7	2	3	2	.429		
Bill Needham (1950–1951)
1950–51	Independent	–	–	–	–	–	–	–	–	–	7	0	7	0	.000		
Program suspended
Mel Massucco (1953–1954)
1953–54	Independent	–	–	–	–	–	–	–	–	–	10	0	9	1	.050		
Steve Kosakowski (1954–1967)
1954–55	Independent	–	–	–	–	–	–	–	–	–	9	6	3	0	.667		
1955–56	Independent	–	–	–	–	–	–	–	–	–	11	5	6	0	.455		
1956–57	Independent	–	–	–	–	–	–	–	–	–	13	5	8	0	.385		
1957–58	Independent	–	–	–	–	–	–	–	–	–	14	6	8	0	.429		
1958–59	Independent	–	–	–	–	–	–	–	–	–	12	3	9	0	.250		
1959–60	Independent	–	–	–	–	–	–	–	–	–	17	5	12	0	.294		
1960–61	Independent	–	–	–	–	–	–	–	–	–	14	7	6	1	.536		
1961–62	ECAC Hockey	18	8	10	0	–	–	–	.444	17th	18	8	10	0	.444		
1962–63	ECAC Hockey	15	7	8	0	–	–	–	.467	15th	16	7	9	0	.438		
1963–64	ECAC Hockey	16	6	8	2	–	–	–	.438	19th	17	6	9	2	.412		
College Division
1964–65	ECAC 2	12	4	8	0	–	–	–	.333	–	15	4	11	0	.267		
1965–66	ECAC 2	16	2	14	0	–	–	–	.125	–	19	3	16	0	.158		
1966–67	ECAC 2	16	8	7	1	–	–	–	.531	–	20	8	11	1	.425		
Jack Canniff (1967–1979)
1967–68	ECAC 2	16	5	11	0	–	–	–	.313	–	20	5	15	0	.250		
1968–69	ECAC 2	18	9	9	0	–	–	–	.500	–	21	9	12	0	.429		
1969–70	ECAC 2	15	10	5	0	–	–	–	.667	–	18	10	8	0	.556		
1970–71	ECAC 2	16	12	3	1	–	–	–	.781	3rd	21	14	6	1	.690	Lost Semifinal, 1–2 (Vermont)	
1971–72	ECAC 2	18	15	3	0	–	–	–	.833	T–2nd	26	19	7	0	.731	Won Quarterfinal, 5–3 (Saint Anselm); Won Semifinal, 4–2 (Merrimack); Won Championship, 8–1 (Buffalo)	
1972–73	ECAC 2	18	12	4	2	–	–	–	.722	3rd	27	14	11	2	.556	Won Quarterfinal, 10–2 (Middlebury); Lost Semifinal, 3–9 (Bowdoin)	
Division II
1973–74	ECAC 2	15	9	6	0	–	–	–	.600	5th	23	10	12	1	.457	Won Quarterfinal, 7–4 (Boston State); Lost Semifinal, 3–4 (Vermont)	
1974–75	ECAC 2	19	9	9	1	–	–	–	.500	–	25	10	14	1	.420		
1975–76	ECAC 2	20	12	8	0	–	–	–	.600	–	25	12	13	0	.480		
1976–77	ECAC 2	20	8	11	1	–	–	–	.425	T–14th	22	8	13	1	.386		
1977–78	ECAC 2	20	8	11	1	–	–	–	.425	19th	20	8	11	1	.425		
1978–79	ECAC 2	20	1	18	1	–	–	–	.075	33rd	20	1	18	1	.075		
Program suspended
Division I
Joe Mallen (1993–2000)
1993–94	Independent	–	–	–	–	–	–	–	–	–	29	20	9	0	.690		
1994–95	Hockey East	24	3	21	0	–	–	0	15	9th	36	6	28	2	.194	Won Play-In, 5–4 (Boston College); Lost Quarterfinal, 4–7 (Maine)	
1995–96	Hockey East	24	4	16	6	–	–	4	36	8th	35	10	19	6	.371	Lost Quarterfinal series, 0–2 (Boston University)	
1996–97	Hockey East	24	7	17	0	–	–	–	14	8th	35	12	23	0	.343	Lost Quarterfinal series, 0–2 (Boston University)	
1997–98	Hockey East	24	3	19	2	–	–	–	8	T–8th	33	6	24	3	.227		
1998–99	Hockey East	24	8	14	2	–	–	–	18	T–6th	35	12	21	2	.371	Lost Quarterfinal series, 0–2 (Maine)	
1999–00	Hockey East	24	5	15	4	–	–	–	14	8th	36	11	20	5	.375	Lost Quarterfinal series, 0–2 (Boston University)	
Don Cahoon (2000–2012)
2000–01	Hockey East	24	7	15	2	–	–	–	16	9th	34	8	22	4	.294		
2001–02	Hockey East	24	3	19	2	–	–	–	8	9th	34	8	24	2	.265		
2002–03	Hockey East	24	10	14	0	–	–	–	20	6th	37	19	17	1	.527	Won Quarterfinal series, 2–0 (Maine); Lost Semifinal, 4–5 (New Hampshire)	
2003–04	Hockey East	24	12	9	3	–	–	–	27	3rd	37	17	14	6	.541	Won Quarterfinal series, 2–0 (Massachusetts–Lowell); Won Semifinal, 5–2 (New Hampshire); Lost Championship, 1–2 (3OT) (Maine)	
2004–05	Hockey East	24	6	16	2	–	–	–	14	8th	38	13	23	2	.368	Lost Quarterfinal series, 0–2 (Boston College)	
2005–06	Hockey East	27	10	15	2	–	–	–	22	8th	36	13	21	2	.389	Lost Quarterfinal series, 0–2 (Boston University)	
2006–07	Hockey East	27	15	9	3	–	–	–	33	4th	39	21	13	5	.603	Won Quarterfinal series, 2–0 (Maine); Lost Semifinal, 2–3 (2OT) (New Hampshire)	Won Regional Semifinal, 1–0 (OT) (Clarkson); Lost Regional Final, 1–3 (Maine)
2007–08	Hockey East	27	9	13	5	–	–	–	23	8th	36	14	16	6	.697	Lost Quarterfinal series, 0–2 (New Hampshire)	
2008–09	Hockey East	27	10	14	3	–	–	–	23	7th	39	16	20	3	.449	Lost Quarterfinal series, 1–2 (Northeastern)	
2009–10	Hockey East	27	13	14	0	–	–	–	26	T–6th	36	18	18	0	.500	Lost Quarterfinal series, 0–2 (Boston College)	
2010–11	Hockey East	27	5	16	6	–	–	–	16	8th	35	6	23	6	.257	Lost Quarterfinal series, 0–2 (Boston College)	
2011–12	Hockey East	27	9	14	4	–	–	–	22	T–8th	36	13	18	5	.431	Lost Quarterfinal series, 0–2 (Boston College)	
John Micheletto (2012–2016)
2012–13	Hockey East	27	9	16	2	–	–	–	20	9th	34	12	19	3	.397		
2013–14	Hockey East	20	4	13	3	–	–	–	22	10th	34	8	22	4	.294	Lost Opening Round, 1–2 (Vermont)	
2014–15	Hockey East	22	5	16	1	–	–	–	11	12th	36	11	23	2	.333	Lost Opening Round series, 1–2 (Notre Dame)	
2015–16	Hockey East	22	2	16	4	–	–	–	8	12th	36	8	24	4	.278	Lost Opening Round series, 0–2 (Boston University)	
Greg Carvel (2016–Present)
2016–17	Hockey East	22	2	19	1	–	–	–	5	12th	36	5	29	2	.167	Lost Opening Round series, 0–2 (Providence)	
2017–18	Hockey East	24	9	13	2	–	–	–	20	8th	39	17	20	2	.462	Won Opening Round series, 2–1 (Vermont); Lost Quarterfinal series, 0–2 (Northeastern)	
2018–19	Hockey East	24	18	6	0	–	–	–	36	1st	41	31	10	0	.756	Won Quarterfinal series, 2–0 (New Hampshire); Lost Semifinal, 0–3 (Boston College)	Won Regional Semifinal, 4–0 (Harvard); Won Regional Final, 4–0 (Notre Dame); Won National Semifinal, 4–3 (OT) (Denver); Lost National Championship, 0–3 (Minnesota–Duluth)
2019–20	Hockey East	24	14	8	2	–	–	–	30	2nd	34	21	11	2	.647	Tournament cancelled	Tournament cancelled
2020–21	Hockey East	22	13	5	4	1	1	1	44	3rd	29	20	5	4	.759	Won Quarterfinal, 4–1 (Northeastern); Won Semifinal, 5–2 (Providence); Won Championship, 1–0 (Massachusetts Lowell)	Won Regional Semifinal, 5–1 (Lake Superior State); Won Regional Final, 4–0 (Bemidji State); Won National Semifinal, 3–2 (OT) (Minnesota Duluth); Won National Championship, 5–0 (St. Cloud State)
2021–22	Hockey East	24	14	8	2	2	3	1	41	T–2nd	37	22	13	2	.622	Won Quarterfinal, 4–2 (Providence); Won Semifinal, 3–1 (Massachusetts Lowell); Won Championship, 2–1 (OT) (Connecticut)	Lost Regional Semifinal, 3–4 (OT) (Minnesota)
2022–23	Hockey East	24	7	14	3	1	3	2	28	9th	35	13	17	5	.443	Lost Opening Round, 2–5 (Boston College)	
2023–24	Hockey East	24	12	10	2	4	2	0	36	T–5th	37	20	14	3	.581	Won Quarterfinal, 3–1 (Providence); Lost Semifinal, 1–8 (Boston College)	Lost Regional Semifinal, 1–2 (2OT) (Denver)
2024–25	Hockey East	24	10	9	5	0	0	2	37	6th	40	21	14	5	.588	Won Opening Round, 2–1 (Vermont); Lost Quarterfinal, 2–3 (OT) (Boston University)	Won Regional Semifinal, 5–4 (OT) (Minnesota); Lost Regional Final, 1–2 (Western Michigan)
Totals											GP	W	L	T	%	Championships	
Regular season											1789	721	940	128	.439	1 Hockey East Championship	
Conference Post-season											69	27	42	0	.391	1 ECAC 2 tournament championship, 2 Hockey East tournament championships	
NCAA Post-season											14	9	5	0	.667	6 NCAA Tournament Appearances	
Regular season and Post-season Record											1872	757	987	128	.439	1 NCAA National Championship	

* Winning percentage is used when conference schedules are unbalanced.
