= 2021 NCAA Division I men's ice hockey tournament =

American college hockey championship

- Teams: 16
- Finals site: PPG Paints Arena, Pittsburgh, Pennsylvania
- Champions: Massachusetts Minutemen (1st title)
- Runner-up: St. Cloud State Huskies (1st title game)
- Semifinalists: Minnesota State Mavericks (1st Frozen Four); Minnesota Duluth Bulldogs (8th Frozen Four)
- Winning coach: Greg Carvel (1st title)
- MOP: Bobby Trivigno (Massachusetts)
- Attendance: 3,963 (Championship); 11,283 (Frozen Four); 16,985 (Tournament)

The 2021 NCAA Division I men's ice hockey tournament was the national championship tournament for men's college ice hockey in the United States. It took place between March 26 and April 10, 2021. The tournament involved 16 teams in single-elimination play to determine the national champion at the Division I level of the National Collegiate Athletic Association (NCAA), the highest level of competition in college hockey. The tournament's Frozen Four – the semifinals and finals – was hosted by Robert Morris University at the PPG Paints Arena in Pittsburgh from April 8 to 10.

The SNHU Arena in Manchester, New Hampshire, was selected to host the Northeast Region, but pulled out on January 26, 2021, due to concerns over the COVID-19 pandemic. The Times Union Center in Albany, New York, was selected as a replacement site.

This year's tournament featured, as of 2024, the longest game in NCAA Division I men's ice hockey tournament history, when the Minnesota Duluth Bulldogs defeated the North Dakota Fighting Hawks by a score of 3–2 in five overtimes, totaling 142:13 minutes of play, in the West Regional Final.

This tournament's Frozen Four teams were also notable for a number of reasons. First, it was just the second time in NCAA Division I men's ice hockey tournament history in which three of the final four teams came from one state. This first occurred in 1992, when the Michigan Wolverines, Michigan State Spartans, and Lake Superior State Lakers, all from Michigan, made the Frozen Four. In this year's tournament, three teams came from Minnesota, these teams being the Minnesota Duluth Bulldogs, St. Cloud State Huskies, and Minnesota State Mavericks. Also, this year's tournament was only the third time since 1992, when Regional Tournaments were first conducted, that no teams ranked no. 1 in their respective Regional Tournament advanced to the Frozen Four. This also occurred in the 1998 and 2007 tournaments.

== Tournament procedure ==
2021 Regionals (blue) and Frozen Four (red)

The tournament is composed of four groups of four teams in regional brackets. The four regionals are officially named after their geographic areas.

Regional semifinals and finals

- March 26–27

East Regional, Webster Bank Arena – Bridgeport, Connecticut (Hosts: Sacred Heart and Yale)
Midwest Regional, Scheels Arena – Fargo, North Dakota (Host: North Dakota)

- March 27–28

Northeast Regional, Times Union Center – Albany, New York (Hosts: ECAC)
West Regional, Budweiser Events Center – Loveland, Colorado (Host: Denver)

National semifinals and championship (Frozen Four and championship)

- April 8 and April 10

PPG Paints Arena – Pittsburgh, Pennsylvania (Host: Robert Morris University)

== Qualifying teams ==
The at-large bids and seeding for each team in the tournament were announced on March 21, 2021.

Typically, teams are seeded according to their PairWise rankings (PWR); however, due to the COVID-19 pandemic causing a severe lack of inter-conference games among the league, using the PWR would not be a reliable representation of overall NCAA standings. As a result, the NCAA Selection Committee awarded seeds manually based on varying factors, including perceived strength of conference and performance against the best teams in conference. Once seeds were determined, matchups were adjusted to prevent teams from the same conference meeting in the first round, as well as minimize the amount of traveling required due to the pandemic.

The NCHC and Big Ten each had four teams receive a berth in the tournament, Hockey East and WCHA each had three teams receive a berth, and one team from Atlantic Hockey and the ECAC each received a berth.

ECAC Tournament champions St. Lawrence earned an autobid but were forced to withdraw from the tournament as a result of a positive COVID-19 test among the team's coaching staff. Quinnipiac was selected to replace St. Lawrence as ECAC's autobid.

On March 25, it was announced that Notre Dame would be forced to withdraw from the tournament due to COVID protocols. As a result, their matchup with Boston College was ruled a no-contest and the Eagles automatically advanced to the Northeast Regional Final. Similarly, on March 26, the NCAA announced Michigan was forced to withdraw as well due to COVID protocols. As a result, Minnesota–Duluth automatically advanced to the Midwest Regional Final.

Midwest Regional – Fargo							East Regional – Bridgeport						
Seed	School	Conference	Record	Berth type	Appearance	Last bid	Seed	School	Conference	Record	Berth type	Appearance	Last bid
1	North Dakota (1)	NCHC	21–5–1	Tournament champion	33rd	2017	1	Wisconsin (4)	Big Ten	20–9–1	At-Large bid	26th	2014
2	Michigan	Big Ten	15–10–1	At-Large bid	38th	2018	2	Massachusetts	Hockey East	16–5–4	Tournament champion	3rd	2019
3	Minnesota Duluth	NCHC	14–10–2	At-Large bid	14th	2019	3	Lake Superior State	WCHA	19–6–3	Tournament champion	11th	1996
4	American International	Atlantic Hockey	15–3–0	Tournament champion	2nd	2019	4	Bemidji State	WCHA	15–9–3	At-Large bid	5th	2010
West Regional – Loveland							Northeast Regional – Albany						
Seed	School	Conference	Record	Berth type	Appearance	Last bid	Seed	School	Conference	Record	Berth type	Appearance	Last bid
1	Minnesota (3)	Big Ten	23–6–0	Tournament champion	38th	2017	1	Boston College (2)	Hockey East	17–5–1	At-Large bid	36th	2016
2	Minnesota State	WCHA	20–4–1	At-Large bid	7th	2019	2	St. Cloud State	NCHC	17–10–0	At-Large bid	15th	2019
3	Quinnipiac	ECAC	17–7–4	Replacement Autobid	7th	2019	3	Boston University	Hockey East	10–4–1	At-Large bid	37th	2018
4	Omaha	NCHC	14–10–1	At-Large bid	4th	2015	4	Notre Dame	Big Ten	14–13–2	At-Large bid	12th	2019

Number in parentheses denotes overall seed in the tournament.

== Tournament bracket ==
Regional semifinals March 26–27
1	North Dakota (1)	5
4	American International	1
Midwest – Fargo – Fri/Sat
2	~~Michigan~~^{†}	–
3	Minnesota–Duluth	–
1	Wisconsin (4)	3
4	Bemidji State	6
East – Bridgeport – Fri/Sat
2	Massachusetts	5
3	Lake Superior State	1
1	Minnesota (3)	7
4	Omaha	2
West – Loveland – Sat/Sun
2	Minnesota State	4*
3	Quinnipiac	3
1	Boston College (2)	–
4	~~Notre Dame~~^{†}	–
Northeast – Albany – Sat/Sun
2	St. Cloud State	6
3	Boston University	2

Regional Finals; March 27–28
1	North Dakota (1)	2
3	Minnesota–Duluth	3*****
4	Bemidji State	0
2	Massachusetts	4
1	Minnesota (3)	0
2	Minnesota State	4
1	Boston College (2)	1
2	St. Cloud State	4

Semifinals; April 8
MW3	Minnesota–Duluth	2
E2	Massachusetts	3*
W2	Minnesota State	4
NE2	St. Cloud State	5

Championship; April 10
E2	Massachusetts	5
NE2	St. Cloud State	0

* denotes overtime period
† Michigan and Notre Dame were removed from the tournament due to positive COVID-19 test results.

== Results ==
=== Midwest Region – Fargo, North Dakota ===
==== Regional semifinals ====
March 26, 2021; 7:30 PM	(1) North Dakota	5 – 1 (4–0, 0–0, 1–1)	(4) American International	Scheels Arena, Fargo, North Dakota; Attendance: 1,435

Game reference

Adam Scheel
Goalies
Stefano Durante (20 min)
Jake Kucharski (40 min)
Referees:
Robert Lukkason
Brady Johnson
Linesmen:
Tyler Landman
Nathan Voll

(Bernard-Docker, Sanderson) Jasper Weatherby (13) – 08:58	1–0
(unassisted) Jasper Weatherby (14) – GW – 11:54	2–0
(Kleven, Caulfield) Grant Mismash (10) – 14:16	3–0
(Gaber, Bast) Collin Adams (12) – 16:22	4–0
	4–1	57:46 – Tobias Fladeby (10) (Theodore, Callahan)
(Kawaguchi) Collin Adams (13) – 58:08	5–1

12 min
Penalties
12 min
33
Shots
25

~~March 26, 2021~~	~~(2) Michigan~~	No contest	(3) Minnesota–Duluth

==== Regional Final ====
March 27, 2021; 6:30 PM	(1) North Dakota	2 – 3 (5OT) (0–0, 0–0, 2–2, 0–0, 0–0, 0–0, 0–0, 0–1)	(3) Minnesota–Duluth	Scheels Arena, Fargo, North Dakota; Attendance: 1,494

Game reference

Adam Scheel
Goalies
Zach Stejskal (124:37)
Ryan Fanti (17:36)
Referees:
Joe Carusone
C. J. Hanifin
Linesmen:
Ryan Knapp
Brian Oliver

	0–1	43:21 – Jackson Cates (11) (Lellig, Bender)
	0–2	44:41 – Cole Koepke (14) (unassisted)
(Weatherby, Pinto) Collin Adams (14) – EA – 58:19	1–2
(Pinto, Kiersted) Jordan Kawaguchi (10) – EA – 59:03	2–2
	2–3	142:13 – GW – Luke Mylymok (2) (unassisted)

6 min
Penalties
6 min
65
Shots
54

=== Northeast Region – Albany, New York ===
==== Regional semifinals ====
~~March 27, 2021~~	(1) Boston College	No contest	~~(4) Notre Dame~~

March 27, 2021; 1:00 PM	(2) St. Cloud State	6 – 2 (0–0, 3–2, 3–0)	(3) Boston University	Times Union Center, Albany, New York; Attendance: 1,136

Game reference

Dávid Hrenák
Goalies
Drew Commesso
Referees:
Colin Kronfrost
Brett DesRosiers
Linesmen:
Sam Shikowsky
Nick Bradshaw

	0–1	20:08 – Wilmer Skoog (4) (Cockerill)
(Walker, Trejbal) Micah Miller (2) – 32:14	1–1
(Hammer, Kupka) Nick Perbix (7) – 33:29	2–1
	2–2	35:28 – PP – Jake Wise (9) (Tuch)
(Walker) Easton Brodzinski (12) – GW – 36:00	3–2
(unassisted) Jami Krannila (11) – SH PS – 44:17	4–2
(Walker) Easton Brodzinski (13) – 50:04	5–2
(Bushy, Krannila) Veeti Miettinen (11) – 55:02	6–2

23 min
Penalties
21 min
38
Shots
36

==== Regional Final ====
March 28, 2021; 5:30	(1) Boston College	1 – 4 (1–0, 0–3, 0–1)	(2) St. Cloud State	Times Union Center, Albany, New York; Attendance: 1,136

Game reference

Spencer Knight
Goalies
Dávid Hrenák
Referees:
Ryan Sweeney
Mike Schubert
Linesmen:
Joe Sherman
Anthony Valley

(Newhook, Hardman) Matt Boldy (11) – 14:23	1–0
	1–1	29:21 – Luke Jaycox (1) (Okabe, Krannila)
	1–2	35:15 – GW – Will Hammer (2) (Perbix, Cockrell)
	1–3	39:15 – Nolan Walker (9) (Perbix)
	1–4	59:15 – EN – Micah Miller (3) (Bushy)

2 min
Penalties
4 min
27
Shots
36

=== West Region – Loveland, Colorado ===
==== Regional semifinals ====
March 27, 2021; 8:00 PM	(1) Minnesota	7 – 2 (3–1, 3–0, 1–1)	(4) Omaha	Budweiser Events Center, Loveland, Colorado; Attendance: 125

Game reference

Jack LaFontaine
Goalies
Isaiah Saville (27:13)
Austin Roden (32:47)
Referees:
Scott Hansen
Walker Holton
Linesmen:
Kevin Briganti
Kyle Richetelle

(Munson, Faber) Mason Nevers (1) – 05:48	1–0
(Faber, Johnson) Jack Perbix (4) – 15:35	2–0
(McLaughlin, Walker) Scott Reedy (11) – GW – 17:36	3–0
	3–1	18:04 – Taylor Ward (12) (Weiss, Scanlin)
(Faber, Meyers) Ryan Johnson (2) – 20:41	4–1
(LaCombe, Brodzinski) Ben Meyers (12) – 27:13	5–1
(Ranta, Faber) Mason Nevers (2) – 36:13	6–1
	6–2	43:05 – Taylor Ward (13) (Weiss, Proctor)
(Nelson, Faber) Sampo Ranta (19) – 44:17	7–2

2 min
Penalties
4 min
30
Shots
28

March 27, 2021; 2:00 PM	(2) Minnesota State	4 – 3 (OT) (0–2, 1–0, 2–1, 1–0)	(3) Quinnipiac	Budweiser Events Center, Loveland, Colorado; Attendance: 101

Game reference

Dryden McKay
Goalies
Keith Petruzzelli
Referees:
Tony Czech
Brett Sheva
Linesmen:
Justin Cornell
Pat Richardson

	0–1	03:00 – Odeen Tufto (8) (Räsänen)
	0–2	15:35 – Peter DiLiberatore (5) (van Nes, Fillion)
(Napravnik) Jake Jaremko (4) – PP – 38:09	1–2
	1–3	48:54 – C. J. McGee (1) (Miller, Harris)
(Gerads, Aamodt) Nathan Smith (6) – 54:54	2–3
(Livingstone) Cade Borchardt (9) – EA – 58:58	3–3
(Furry, Lutz) Ryan Sandelin (6) – GW – 71:13	4–3

6 min
Penalties
4 min
38
Shots
30

==== Regional Final ====
March 28, 2021; 6:00	(1) Minnesota	0 – 4 (0–2, 0–0, 0–2)	(2) Minnesota State	Budweiser Events Center, Loveland, Colorado; Attendance: 175

Game reference

Jack LaFontaine
Goalies
Dryden McKay
Referees:
Peter Schlittenhardt
Jeremy Tufts
Linesmen:
William Kingdom
Nicholas Briganti

0–1	10:23 – GW – Sam Morton (5) (Sandelin, Zmolek)
0–2	12:30 – Ryan Sandelin (7) (McNeely, Furry)
0–3	49:50 – Nathan Smith (7) (Borchardt, Napravnik)
0–4	57:41 – EN – Dallas Gerads (8) (Aamodt)

6 min
Penalties
8 min
22
Shots
27

=== East Region – Bridgeport, Connecticut ===
==== Regional semifinals ====
March 26, 2021; 1:00 PM	(1) Wisconsin	3 – 6 (0–2, 1–2, 2–2)	(4) Bemidji State	Webster Bank Arena, Bridgeport, Connecticut; Attendance: 0

Game reference

Robbie Beydoun (40 min)
Cameron Rowe (20 min)
Goalies
Zach Driscoll
Referees:
Brendan Blanchard
Chris Leavitt
Linesmen:
Bob Griffin
Brendan Lewis

	0–1	06:33 – Ross Armour (5) (Rosén)
	0–2	19:44 – Elias Rosén (5) (unassisted)
(C. Caufield, Pelton-Byce) Linus Weissbach (12) – PP – 22:38	1–2
	1–3	34:42 – Ethan Somoza (3) (Miller, Harris)
	1–4	38:39 – SH GW – Owen Sillinger (10) (unassisted)
	1–5	46:08 – Ethan Somoza (3) (Harris)
(Holloway, Pelton-Byce) Cole Caufield (29) – PP – 48:19	2–5
(Ahcan, Vorlicky) Cole Caufield (30) – 54:56	3–5
	3–6	59:58 – EN – Brendan Harris (9) (Somoza)

6 min
Penalties
12 min
33
Shots
40

March 26, 2021; 6:30 PM	(2) Massachusetts	5 – 1 (1–1, 2–0, 2–0)	(3) Lake Superior State	Webster Bank Arena, Bridgeport, Connecticut; Attendance: 100

Game reference

Filip Lindberg
Goalies
Mareks Mitens
Referees:
Dan Dreger
Joseph Sullivan
Linesmen:
Tony Anderson
Dana Penkivech

(Harding, Jones) Jake Gaudet (4) – 10:07	1–0
	1–1	17:14 – Ashton Calder (16) (Veillette, Nordqvist)
(Trivigno) Josh Lopina (9) – GW – 31:03	2–1
(Farmer, Chau) Carson Gicewicz (14) – 33:00	3–1
(Chau, Jones) Jake Gaudet (5) – 50:49	4–1
(Jones) Anthony Del Gaizo (1) – 55:47	5–1

12 min
Penalties
8 min
37
Shots
31

==== Regional Final ====
March 27, 2021; 4:00 PM	(2) Massachusetts	4 – 0 (2–0, 1–0, 1–0)	(4) Bemidji State	Webster Bank Arena, Bridgeport, Connecticut; Attendance: 0

Game reference

Filip Lindberg
Goalies
Zach Driscoll
Referees:
Nick Krebsbach
Ryan Hersey
Linesmen:
Tyler Liffrig
Justin Hills

(Chau, Bohlinger) Carson Gicewicz (15) – SH GW – 14:24	1–0
(Kessel) Carson Gicewicz (16) – 19:08	2–0
(Gaudet, M. Del Gaizo) Carson Gicewicz (17) – 26:34	3–0
(M. Del Gaizo) Oliver Chau (5) – EN – 56:56	4–0

23 min
Penalties
6 min
28
Shots
18

=== Frozen Four – Pittsburgh, Pennsylvania ===
==== National semifinal ====
April 8, 2021; 5:00 PM	(W2) Minnesota State	4 – 5 (1–2, 2–1, 1–2)	(NE2) St. Cloud State	PPG Paints Arena, Pittsburgh, Pennsylvania; Attendance: 3,660

Game reference

Dryden McKay
Goalies
Dávid Hrenák
Referees:
Peter Schlittenhardt
Jeremy Tufts
Linesmen:
Nicholas Briganti
William Kingdon

	0–1	03:18 – PP – Spencer Meier (4) (Okabe, Fitzgerald)
(Hirose, Napravnik) Nathan Smith (8) – PP – 16:09	1–1
	1–2	16:19 – Kyler Kupka (3) (Walker, Hentges)
	1–3	22:40 – Will Hammer (3) (unassisted)
(Gerads, Carroll) Walker Duehr (10) – 32:07	2–3
(Morton, Hirose) Nathan Smith (9) – PP – 34:24	3–3
(Duehr) Dallas Gerads (9) – 44:18	4–3
	4–4	50:14 – Joe Molenaar (1) (Hammer, Meier)
	4–5	59:06 – GW – Nolan Walker (4) (Donohue, Kupka)

2 min
Penalties
4 min
29
Shots
22

April 8, 2021; 9:00 PM	(E2) Massachusetts	3 – 2 (OT) (1–1, 0–1, 1–0, 1–0)	(MW3) Minnesota Duluth	PPG Paints Arena, Pittsburgh, Pennsylvania; Attendance: 3,660

Game reference

Matt Murray
Goalies
Zach Stejskal
Referees:
Brett DesRosiers
Brett Sheva
Linesmen:
Justin Cornell
Pat Richardson

(Kessel, Chau) Zac Jones (9) – PP – 15:33	1–0
	1–1	17:50 – Tanner Laderoute (3) (Olson, Kelley)
	1–2	31:01 – Cole Koepke (15) (Cates, Swaney)
(Lopina, Trivigno) Anthony Del Gaizo (2) – 48:25	2–2
(Trivigno, Lopina) Garrett Wait (9) – GW – 74:30	3–2

2 min
Penalties
4 min
28
Shots
38

=== 2021 National Championship ===
==== (E2) Massachusetts vs. (NE2) St. Cloud State ====
April 10, 2021; 7:00 PM	(E2) Massachusetts	5 – 0	(NE2) St. Cloud State	PPG Paints Arena, Pittsburgh, Pennsylvania; Attendance: 3,963

Game reference

Scoring summary
Period	Team	Goal	Assist(s)	Time	Score
1st	UMA	Aaron Bohlinger (1) – GW	Sullivan and Farmer	7:26	1–0 UMA
1st	UMA	Reed Lebster (2)	Kiefiuk	18:56	2–0 UMA
2nd	UMA	Philip Lagunov (6) – SH	unassisted	25:10	3–0 UMA
2nd	UMA	Matthew Kessel (10) – PP	Chau and Gaudet	33:45	4–0 UMA
3rd	UMA	Bobby Trivigno (11)	Lebster	46:00	5–0 UMA
Penalty summary
Period	Team	Player	Penalty	Time	PIM
1st	UMA	Anthony Del Gaizo	Slashing	15:27	2:00
2nd	STC	Seamus Donohue	Tripping	20:24	2:00
2nd	UMA	Ryan Sullivan	Tripping	23:57	2:00
2nd	UMA	Jake Gaudet	Elbowing	30:31	2:00
2nd	STC	Bench (served by Zach Okabe)	Too many men on the ice	32:35	2:00
3rd	None				

Shots by period
Team	1	2	3	T
St. Cloud State	3	12	10	25
Massachusetts	7	6	9	22

Goaltenders
Team	Name	Saves	Goals against	Time on ice
STC	Dávid Hrenák	17	5	60:00
UMA	Filip Lindberg	25	0	60:00

== All-Tournament team ==
- G: Filip Lindberg (Massachusetts)
- D: Zac Jones (Massachusetts)
- D: Matthew Kessel (Massachusetts)
- F: Nathan Smith (Minnesota State)
- F: Bobby Trivigno* (Massachusetts)
- F: Nolan Walker (St. Cloud State)

* Most Outstanding Player(s)

== Record by conference ==
Conference	Bids	Record	Win %	Regional Finals	Frozen Four	Championship Game	Champions
NCHC	4	5–4	.556	3	2	1	–
Big Ten	4	1–2	.333	1	–	–	–
Hockey East	3	4–2	.667	2	1	1	1
WCHA	3	3–3	.500	2	1	–	–
Atlantic Hockey	1	0–1	.000	–	–	–	–
ECAC Hockey	1	0–1	.000	–	–	–	–

Note: Two regional semifinal games were declared 'No Contest' and the four teams involved were not credited with a win or a loss in those games.

== Media ==
=== Television ===
ESPN had US television rights to all games during the tournament for the sixteenth consecutive year. ESPN aired every game, beginning with the regionals, on ESPN, ESPN2, ESPNews, ESPNU, and ESPN3, which were streamed online via WatchESPN.

==== Broadcast assignments ====
Regionals

- East Regional: John Buccigross, Barry Melrose, and Colby Cohen – Bridgeport, Connecticut
- Midwest Regional: Leah Hextall and Dave Starman – Fargo, North Dakota
- Northeast Regional: Kevin Brown and Sean Ritchlin – Albany, New York
- West Regional: Ben Holden and Fred Pletsch – Loveland, Colorado

Frozen Four

- John Buccigross, Barry Melrose, Colby Cohen, and Quint Kessenich – Pittsburgh, Pennsylvania

=== Radio ===
Westwood One had exclusive radio rights to the Frozen Four and broadcast both the semifinals and the championship.

- Brian Tripp and Dave Starman
