= Zac Jones =

American ice hockey player (born 2000)

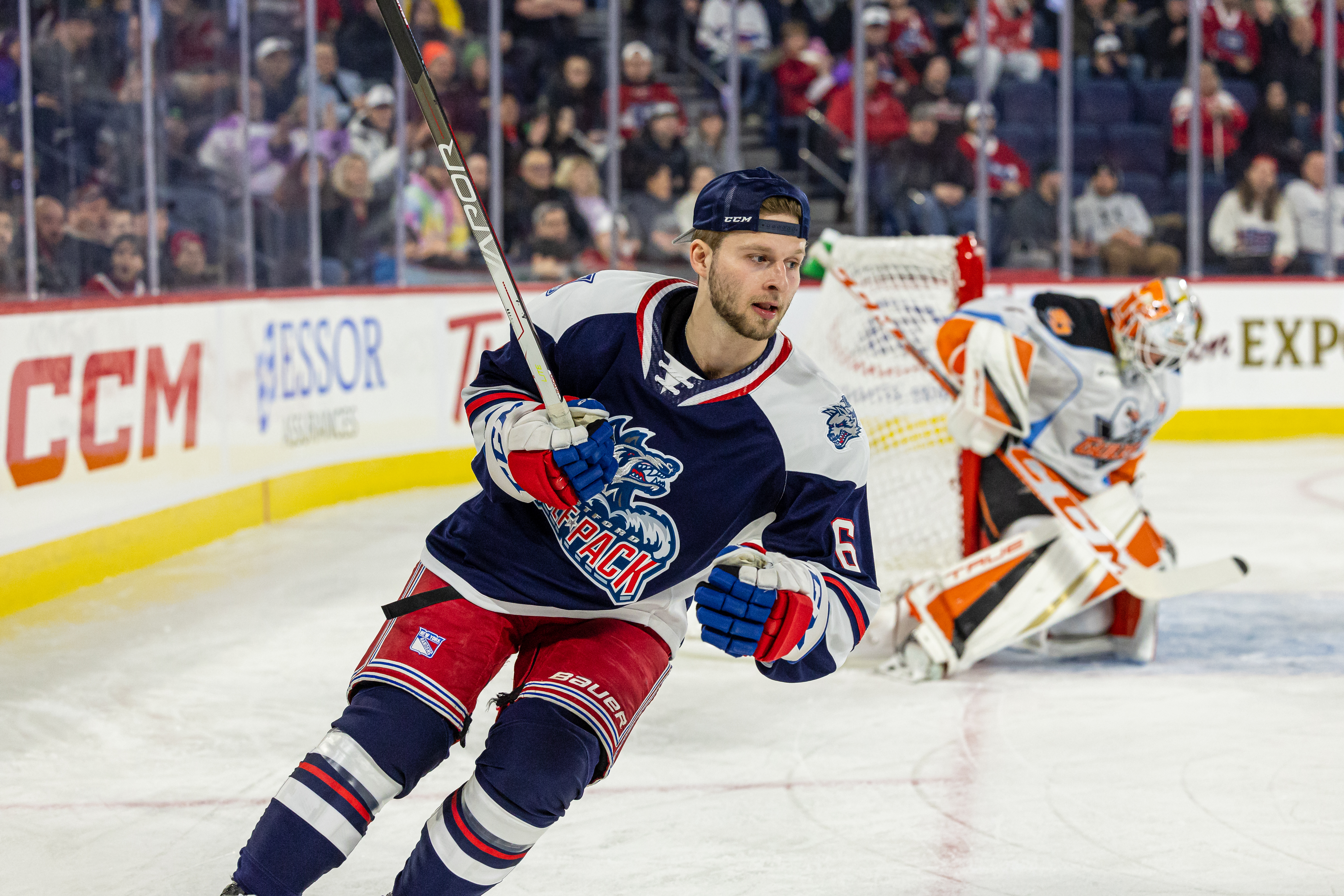
- Jones with the Hartford Wolf Pack in 2023
- Born: October 18, 2000 (age 26) Glen Allen, Virginia, U.S.
- Height: 5 ft 11 in (180 cm)
- Weight: 190 lb (86 kg; 13 st 8 lb)
- Position: Defense
- Shoots: Left
- NHL team (P) Cur. team Former teams: Utah Mammoth; Tucson Roadrunners (AHL); New York Rangers
- National team: United States
- NHL draft: 68th overall, 2019; New York Rangers
- Playing career: 2021–present

Zachary Jones (born October 18, 2000) is an American professional ice hockey player who is a defenseman for the Tucson Roadrunners of the American Hockey League (AHL) while under contract to the Utah Mammoth of the National Hockey League (NHL). Jones was drafted by the New York Rangers in the third round, 68th overall, of the 2019 NHL entry draft.

== Playing career ==
Jones was drafted 68th overall by the New York Rangers at the 2019 NHL entry draft. He won an NCAA championship with the UMass Minutemen in 2020–21 prior to signing a professional contract with the Rangers on April 13, 2021. Jones made his NHL debut for the Rangers on April 22, in a 3–2 loss against the Philadelphia Flyers. With his NHL debut Jones became the sixth Virginian to play in the NHL, and the first player from Richmond, Virginia, to be drafted and play in the NHL. Jones recorded his first NHL point with an assist on a goal by Kaapo Kakko in his third NHL game on April 25, against the Buffalo Sabres.

Jones spent most of the 2021–22 season with the Rangers' American Hockey League (AHL), the Hartford Wolf Pack, although he played 12 games for the Rangers. According to Hartford assistant coach Casey Torres, "He was awesome, I thought he was our best player for the entirety of the season. He was so dynamic. He created offense from high and low probability situations. He competed hard. Such great vision on the ice and just a real dynamic presence for us offensively on the back end." On June 16, 2023, Jones signed a two-year contract extension with the Rangers.

Released as a free agent after not being tendered a qualifying offer by the New York Rangers, Jones was signed to a one-year, two-way contract with the Buffalo Sabres for the 2025–26 season on July 1, 2025. Assigned to AHL affiliate, the Rochester Americans, Jones recorded 10 goals and 62 points in 60 appearances, earning selection to the AHL First All-Star Team and representing the North Division at his first AHL All-Star Classic.

Unable to feature with the Sabres, Jones left the organization as a free agent and was signed two-year, two-way contract with the Utah Mammoth on July 1, 2026. On November 9, 2026, Jones was called up to the Mammoth, and made his Mammoth debut on November 14, 2026, scoring 2 goals in a losing effort against the San Jose Sharks.

== Career statistics ==
=== Regular season and playoffs ===
			Regular season					Playoffs
Season	Team	League	GP	G	A	Pts	PIM	GP	G	A	Pts	PIM
2017–18	Selects Academy	USPHL	7	2	7	9	2	4	1	1	2	2
2018–19	Tri-City Storm	USHL	56	7	45	52	38	6	0	5	5	2
2019–20	UMass-Amherst	HE	32	3	20	23	24	—	—	—	—	—
2020–21	UMass-Amherst	HE	29	9	15	24	8	—	—	—	—	—
2020–21	New York Rangers	NHL	10	0	4	4	2	—	—	—	—	—
2021–22	Hartford Wolf Pack	AHL	52	9	26	35	25	—	—	—	—	—
2021–22	New York Rangers	NHL	12	0	2	2	0	—	—	—	—	—
2022–23	Hartford Wolf Pack	AHL	54	8	23	31	34	9	2	4	6	8
2022–23	New York Rangers	NHL	16	1	1	2	4	—	—	—	—	—
2023–24	New York Rangers	NHL	31	2	7	9	8	—	—	—	—	—
2024–25	New York Rangers	NHL	46	1	10	11	24	—	—	—	—	—
2024–25	Hartford Wolf Pack	AHL	2	1	0	1	0	—	—	—	—	—
2025–26	Rochester Americans	AHL	60	10	52	62	14	3	0	0	0	0
NHL totals			115	4	24	28	38	—	—	—	—	—

=== International ===
Medal record

Men's ice hockey

Representing the United States

World Championships
Bronze medal – third place	2021 Latvia	

Year	Team	Event	Result	GP	G	A	Pts	PIM
2018	United States	WJAC	1st place, gold medalist(s)	6	1	3	4	2
2020	United States	WJC	6th	5	1	1	2	0
2021	United States	WC	3rd place, bronze medalist(s)	10	0	3	3	4
Junior totals				11	2	4	6	2
Senior totals				10	0	3	3	4

== Awards and honours ==
Award	Year	Ref
USHL
All-Rookie Team	2019	
Rookie of the Year	2019	
Second All-Star Team	2019	
College
Hockey East All-Rookie Team	2019–20	
All-Hockey East Second Team	2020–21	
AHCA East Second Team All-American	2020–21	
Hockey East All-Tournament Team	2021	
NCAA All-Tournament Team	2021	
AHL
Eddie Shore Award	2026	
