= Matthew Kessel =

American ice hockey player (born 2000)

Matt Kessel
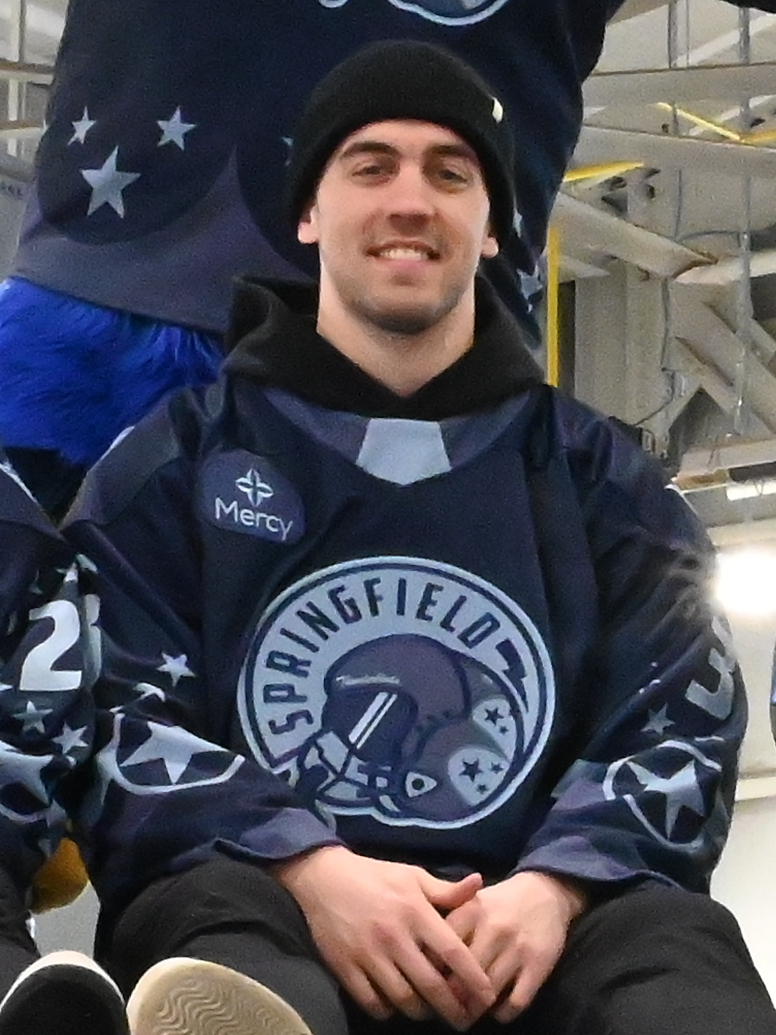
- Kessel with the Springfield Thunderbirds in 2025
- Born: June 23, 2000 (age 26) Phoenix, Arizona, U.S.
- Height: 6 ft 2 in (188 cm)
- Weight: 205 lb (93 kg; 14 st 9 lb)
- Position: Defense
- Shoots: Right
- NHL team Former teams: New York Islanders; St. Louis Blues
- National team: United States
- NHL draft: 150th overall, 2020; St. Louis Blues
- Playing career: 2022–present

Matthew James Kessel (born June 23, 2000) is an American professional ice hockey player who is a defenseman for the New York Islanders of the National Hockey League (NHL).

== Early life ==
Kessel was born on June 23, 2000 in Arizona, USA to parents Tom and Leila Kessel. Although he was born in Arizona, Kessel grew up in Detroit, Michigan alongside his three older brothers. His eldest brother played college football at the University of Cincinnati while his other two brothers played college hockey. His second oldest brother played college hockey at Western Michigan University before transitioning to the ECHL. His third oldest brother played college hockey at the College of the Holy Cross from 2017 to 2021.

== Playing career ==
=== Amateur ===
Kessel first played junior ice hockey for the Fargo Force of the United States Hockey League (USHL) in 2017–18, moving to the Chicago Steel later that season. In 2018, he moved to the Sioux Falls Stampede.

=== Collegiate career ===
Kessel originally committed to play NCAA Division I college hockey at Miami of Ohio but changed to the University of Massachusetts Amherst following the firing of Miami's head coach. Due to a close connection with one of the assistant coaches, Kessel was offered a spot at UMass Amherst without seeing the campus or being recruited through the normal means. Kessel began the 2019–20 season playing on the UMass Minutemen's third defensive pairing alongside fellow freshman Gianfranco Cassaro. He made his collegiate debut on October 11 and scored his first collegiate goal on October 15 against Northeastern. Kessel impressed the UMass coaching staff through the first seven games of the season enough that he was dubbed the "most impressive freshman" by head coach Greg Carvel. Mid-way through November, as the Minutemen maintained a 7–3 record, Kessel was promoted to their top defensive pair with Jake McLaughlin. He then played the majority of the season as one of the team's top defenseman alongside Marc Del Gaizo and finished with seven goals to lead all freshmen defensemen in the nation.

=== Professional career ===
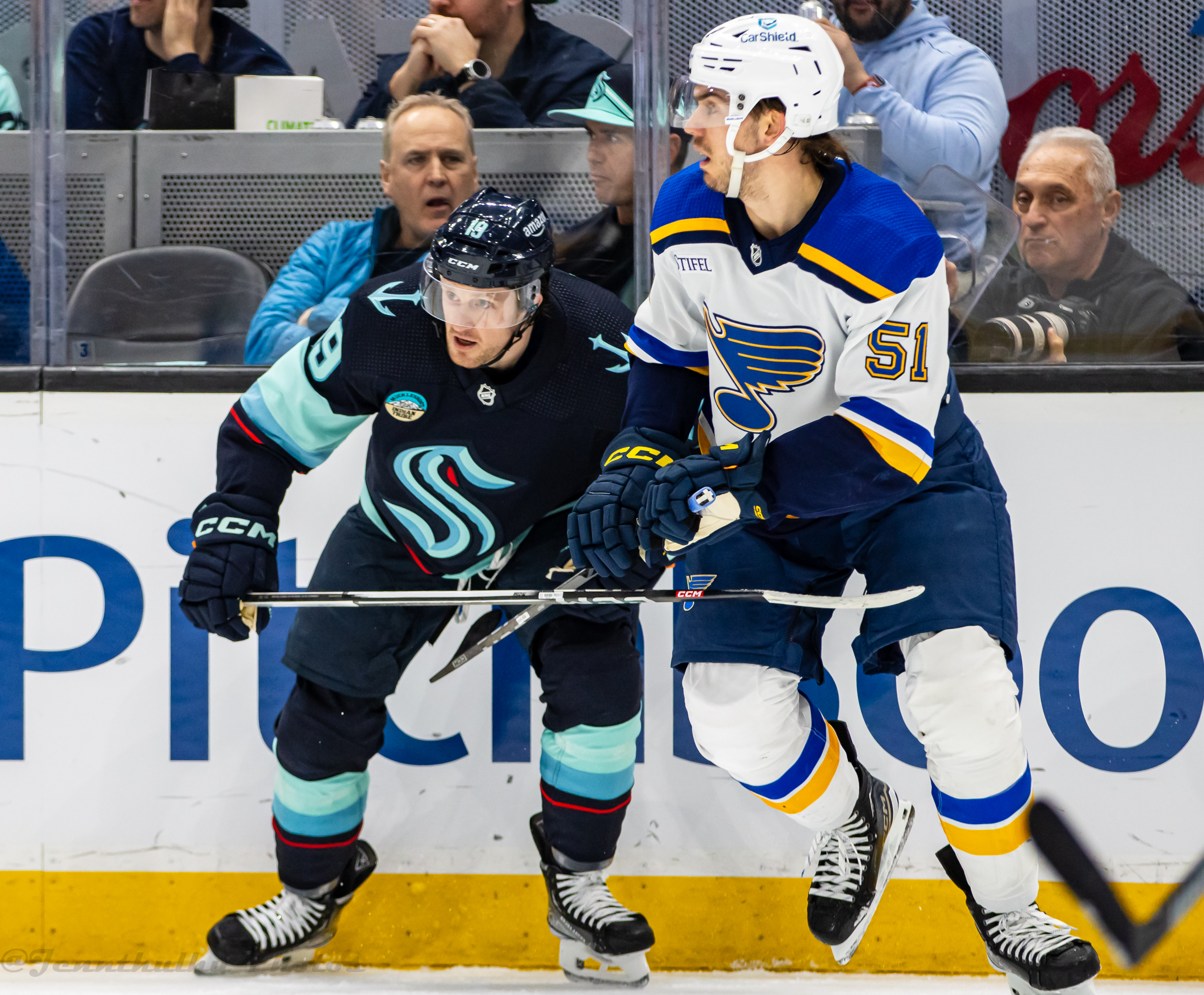
Kessel (right) with the St. Louis Blues in 2024.

Kessel was selected by the St. Louis Blues in the fifth round, 150th overall, in the 2020 NHL entry draft. After completing his junior season with the Minutemen, Kessel concluded his collegiate career in signing a two-year, entry-level contract with the Blues on March 28, 2022. He was assigned to complete the 2021–22 season with the team's American Hockey League (AHL) affiliate, the Springfield Thunderbirds.

During the tail end of the 2022–23 season, Kessel was recalled and made his NHL debut with the Blues on April 2, 2023, against the Boston Bruins. He played just one more game, two days later, before being sent down to the AHL.

For the 2023–24 season, Kessel was again assigned to begin the year with the Thunderbirds. On December 30, 2023, he was recalled to the Blues. On February 13, 2024, he recorded his first NHL point, an assist on a goal by Alexey Toropchenko. On March 13, Kessel signed a two-year, one-way contract extension with the Blues. In his 37th game, he scored his first NHL goal on April 7, against Lukáš Dostál of the Anaheim Ducks.

On July 1, 2026, Kessel was signed as a free agent to a one-year, $850,000 contract with the New York Islanders after not receiving a qualifying offer from the Blues.

== Career statistics ==
=== Regular season and playoffs ===
			Regular season					Playoffs
Season	Team	League	GP	G	A	Pts	PIM	GP	G	A	Pts	PIM
2017–18	Fargo Force	USHL	32	0	3	3	18	—	—	—	—	—
2017–18	Chicago Steel	USHL	20	0	0	0	4	3	0	0	0	2
2018–19	Sioux Falls Stampede	USHL	62	2	17	19	38	12	1	3	4	14
2019–20	UMass-Amherst	HE	34	7	4	11	48	—	—	—	—	—
2020–21	UMass-Amherst	HE	29	10	13	23	16	—	—	—	—	—
2021–22	UMass-Amherst	HE	37	6	11	17	22	—	—	—	—	—
2021–22	Springfield Thunderbirds	AHL	15	0	3	3	8	18	1	1	2	6
2022–23	Springfield Thunderbirds	AHL	71	5	28	33	66	2	0	0	0	0
2022–23	St. Louis Blues	NHL	2	0	0	0	0	—	—	—	—	—
2023–24	Springfield Thunderbirds	AHL	36	3	5	8	16	—	—	—	—	—
2023–24	St. Louis Blues	NHL	39	1	6	7	12	—	—	—	—	—
2024–25	St. Louis Blues	NHL	29	0	3	3	10	—	—	—	—	—
2024–25	Springfield Thunderbirds	AHL	29	5	12	17	25	—	—	—	—	—
2025–26	St. Louis Blues	NHL	29	2	1	3	10	—	—	—	—	—
NHL totals			99	3	10	13	32	—	—	—	—	—

=== International ===
Year	Team	Event	Result	GP	G	A	Pts	PIM
2024	United States	WC	5th	2	0	1	1	0
Senior totals				2	0	1	1	0
