= Filip Lindberg =

- Born: 31 January 1999 (age 26) Espoo, Finland
- Height: 185 cm (6 ft 1 in)
- Weight: 88 kg (194 lb; 13 st 12 lb)
- Position: Goaltender
- Catches: Left
- Liiga team Former teams: HC Ässät Pori; WBS Penguins; HC TPS; HPK; Tappara
- NHL draft: 197th overall, 2019; Minnesota Wild
- Playing career: 2021–present

Filip Lindberg (born 31 January 1999) is a Finnish ice hockey goaltender for HC Ässät Pori of the Liiga.

== Playing career ==
Lindberg played college hockey for the UMass Minutemen from 2018 to 2021, and helped UMass win a national championship in 2021.

He was selected by the Minnesota Wild in the 2019 NHL entry draft, but did not sign with the team.

On 28 July 2021, Lindberg signed a two-year contract with the Pittsburgh Penguins.

On 2 May 2023, he signed with HC TPS.

On 10 May 2024, he signed with SaiPa.

On 10 May 2025, Lindberg signed with HC Ässät Pori.
