= Matt Murray (ice hockey, born 1998) =

Canadian ice hockey player (born 1998)

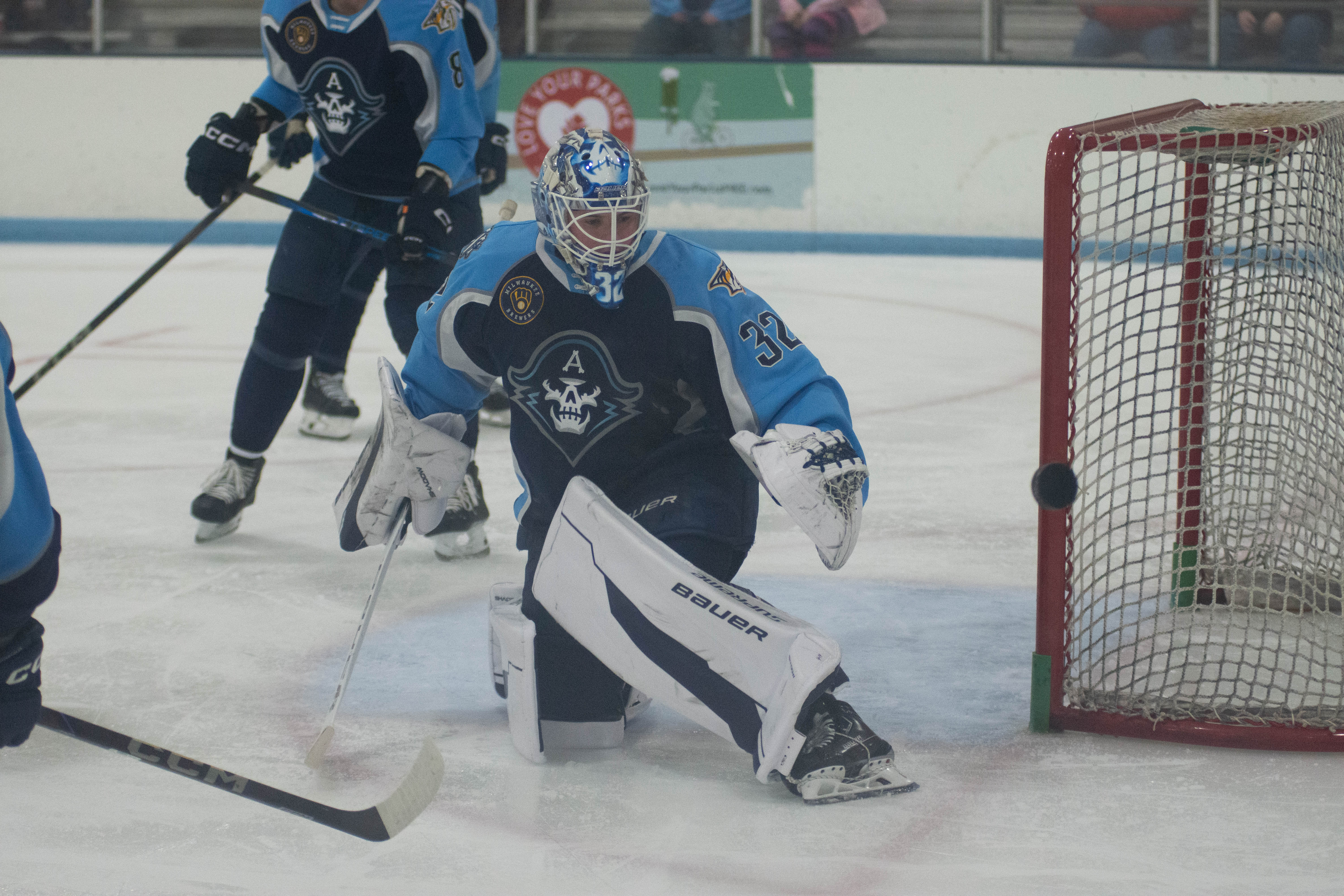
- Murray with the Milwaukee Admirals in 2025
- Born: February 2, 1998 (age 28) St. Albert, Alberta, Canada
- Height: 6 ft 1 in (185 cm)
- Weight: 185 lb (84 kg; 13 st 3 lb)
- Position: Goaltender
- Catches: Left
- NHL team Former teams: Nashville Predators; Dallas Stars
- NHL draft: Undrafted
- Playing career: 2022–present

Matthew Murray (born February 2, 1998) is a Canadian professional ice hockey goaltender for the Nashville Predators of the National Hockey League (NHL). He has previously played in the NHL for the Dallas Stars, with whom he signed as an undrafted free agent in 2022. Murray played junior hockey in the Alberta Junior Hockey League (AJHL) with the Spruce Grove Saints and the United States Hockey League (USHL) with the Fargo Force, as well as NCAA collegiate hockey with the UMass Minutemen.

== Playing career ==
Murray began his junior career in his hometown of St. Albert, spending three seasons with the St. Albert Sabres of the Alberta Major Bantam Hockey League (AMBHL) and St. Albert Flyers of the Alberta Major Midget Hockey League (AMMHL). He then began in Junior A with the Spruce Grove Saints of the Alberta Junior Hockey League (AJHL), leading the team to an AJHL championship in 2015 and winning both the AJHL and CJHL Best Goaltender awards for 2015–16. Murray ultimately joined the Fargo Force of the United States Hockey League (USHL) for his final junior season.

After the conclusion of his time in juniors, Murray played five seasons of collegiate hockey with the University of Massachusetts Amherst. Murray, posting a career 2.23 goals against average and .916 save percentage, helped the Minutemen to three consecutive (Note: Conference championships were not awarded in 2020 due to the COVID-19 pandemic.) Hockey East championships in 2019, 2021, and 2022, with a national championship victory in 2021. In his final season with UMass, Murray was named to the Hockey East Third All-Star team. During this time, Murray gained a degree of notoriety for sharing his name with the then-Pittsburgh Penguins goaltender of the same name, attending the Penguins' rookie camp after his first year at UMass.

As an undrafted free agent, Murray signed an amateur tryout contract with the Texas Stars of the American Hockey League (AHL) after his final season at UMass, appearing in eight games across the regular season and playoffs. During the following offseason, Texas signed Murray to a full two-year contract.

On October 31, 2022, Murray was signed to a one-year entry-level contract by the Dallas Stars of the National Hockey League (NHL), Texas' major-league affiliate. Shortly afterwards, he was recalled to Dallas' main roster as the result of an injury to starting goaltender Jake Oettinger, with Murray serving as backup to Scott Wedgewood.

After further injuries to Wedgewood, Murray was again recalled to Dallas' roster on February 22, 2023; Murray then made his NHL debut on March 2, earning his first win and saving 19 of 21 shots faced in a 5–2 victory over the Chicago Blackhawks. Murray later signed a one-year extension with Dallas on June 15, 2023.

On January 8, 2024, Murray earned his first NHL shutout in a 4–0 win over the Minnesota Wild.

As a free agent following the 2023–24 season, Murray signed a one-year contract with the Nashville Predators on July 1, 2024. In his first season with the team's AHL affiliate Milwaukee Admirals, he appeared in 42 games, leading the league in wins (27) and save percentage (.931), while also ranking fourth in the league in goals-against average (2.12). In recognition of his play, he was named to the Second All-Star Team. On April 9th, 2025, Murray signed a two-year extension with Nashville worth $775,000 per year.

== International play ==
Murray appeared for the Canada West team in four games at the 2015 World Junior A Challenge, posting a .911 save percentage and 2.75 goals against average en route to a gold medal.

== Career statistics ==
=== Regular season and playoffs ===
			Regular season									Playoffs
Season	Team	League	GP	W	L	T/OT	MIN	GA	SO	GAA	SV%	GP	W	L	MIN	GA	SO	GAA	SV%
2014–15	Spruce Grove Saints	AJHL	22	14	1	3	1,184	34	2	1.72	.920	13	8	4	—	—	0	2.05	.917
2015–16	Spruce Grove Saints	AJHL	29	23	4	0	1,639	71	3	2.59	.910	10	6	4	—	—	1	1.90	.941
2016–17	Fargo Force	USHL	52	30	15	3	2,920	115	5	2.36	.910	1	0	0	—	—	0	2.12	.929
2017–18	U. of Massachusetts Amherst	HE	24	9	12	2	1,377	62	4	2.70	.911	—	—	—	—	—	—	—	—
2018–19	U. of Massachusetts Amherst	HE	27	20	5	0	1,533	54	1	2.11	.919	—	—	—	—	—	—	—	—
2019–20	U. of Massachusetts Amherst	HE	20	13	6	0	1,094	34	3	1.86	.919	—	—	—	—	—	—	—	—
2020–21	U. of Massachusetts Amherst	HE	14	10	4	0	851	28	3	1.97	.917	—	—	—	—	—	—	—	—
2021–22	U. of Massachusetts Amherst	HE	36	21	12	2	2,128	82	3	2.31	.917	—	—	—	—	—	—	—	—
2021–22	Texas Stars	AHL	6	5	1	0	357	10	1	1.68	.947	2	0	2	118	3	0	1.52	.952
2022–23	Texas Stars	AHL	34	18	10	5	1,925	76	3	2.37	.911	8	5	3	473	22	0	2.79	.909
2022–23	Dallas Stars	NHL	3	1	2	0	178	10	0	3.39	.844	—	—	—	—	—	—	—	—
2023–24	Texas Stars	AHL	31	14	15	2	1846	93	1	3.02	.896	—	—	—	—	—	—	—	—
2023–24	Dallas Stars	NHL	1	1	0	0	60	0	1	0.00	1.000	—	—	—	—	—	—	—	—
2024–25	Milwaukee Admirals	AHL	43	28	10	5	2577	89	4	2.07	.932	10	5	5	599	32	0	3.20	.878
2025–26	Milwaukee Admirals	AHL	47	22	22	2	2715	128	4	2.83	.904	3	1	2	179	5	0	1.68	.954
NHL totals			4	2	2	0	238	10	1	2.53	.885	—	—	—	—	—	—	—	—

=== International ===
Year	Team	Event	Result	GP	W	L	T/OT	MIN	GA	SO	GAA	SV%
2015	Canada West	WJAC	1st place, gold medalist(s)	5	5	0	0	240	11	0	2.75	.911
Junior totals				5	5	0	0	240	11	0	2.75	.911

== Awards and honors ==
Award	Year
AJHL
Champion	2015
Best Goaltender	2016
CJHL
Top Goaltender	2016
NCAA Division I – Hockey East
Conference champion	2019, 2021, 2022
National Champion	2021
All-Hockey East Third Team	2021–22
AHL
Second All-Star Team	2024–25
