= Marc Del Gaizo =

American ice hockey player (born 1999)

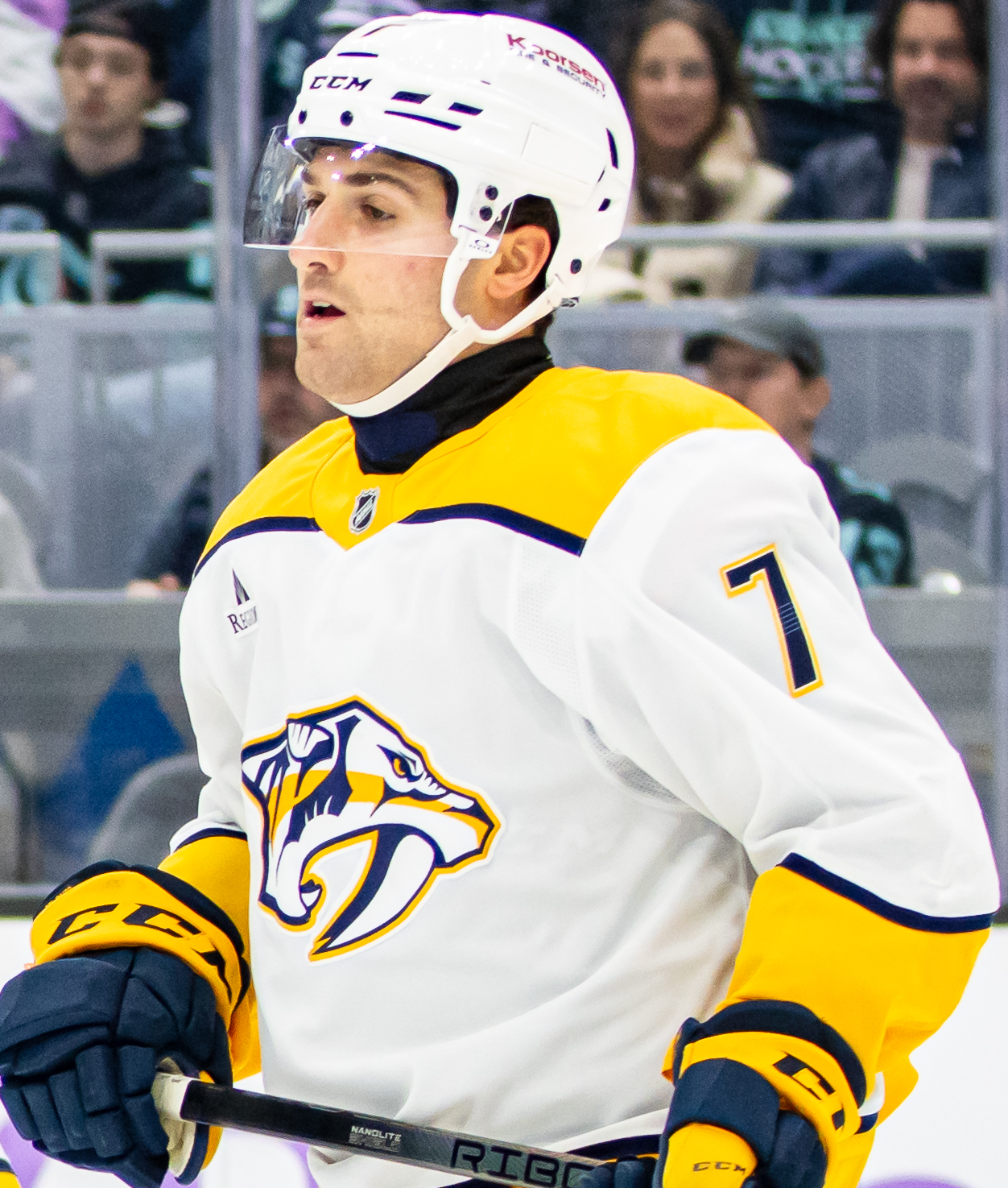
- Del Gaizo with the Nashville Predators in 2024
- Born: October 11, 1999 (age 27) Basking Ridge, New Jersey, U.S.
- Height: 5 ft 11 in (180 cm)
- Weight: 188 lb (85 kg; 13 st 6 lb)
- Position: Defense
- Shoots: Left
- NHL team (P) Cur. team Former teams: New York Rangers; Hartford Wolf Pack (AHL); Nashville Predators
- NHL draft: 109th overall, 2019; Nashville Predators
- Playing career: 2021–present

Marc Douglas Del Gaizo (born October 11, 1999) is an American professional ice hockey player and captain for the Hartford Wolf Pack of the American Hockey League (AHL) while under contract to the New York Rangers of the National Hockey League (NHL). He was selected in the fourth round, 109th overall, by the Nashville Predators in the 2019 NHL entry draft.

== Early life ==
Born and raised in the Basking Ridge section of Bernards Township, New Jersey, Del Gaizo graduated from Ridge High School in 2018.

== Playing career ==
Del Gaizo was selected in the fourth round (109th overall) by the Nashville Predators in the 2019 NHL entry draft. He began his professional career during the 2020–21 AHL season with the Chicago Wolves, the Predators' then American Hockey League (AHL) affiliate, posting five assists through nine games played. In October 2024, Del Gaizo was recalled by Nashville and made his NHL debut on November 4 against the Edmonton Oilers, where he assisted on a goal by Filip Forsberg for his first career NHL point.

In July 2025, Del Gaizo signed a one-year contract with the Montreal Canadiens. After spending the entirety of the 2025–26 season with AHL affiliate Laval Rocket, he agreed to a two-year, two-way contract with the New York Rangers on July 1, 2026. He started the 2026-27 season with the Rangers' AHL affiliate Hartford Wolf Pack and was called up to the Rangers on November 8, 2026. He returned to Hartford on November 16, 2026.

== Career statistics ==
			Regular season					Playoffs
Season	Team	League	GP	G	A	Pts	PIM	GP	G	A	Pts	PIM
2015–16	Muskegon Lumberjacks	USHL	2	0	0	0	0	—	—	—	—	—
2015–16	New Jersey Rockets	EHL	34	7	19	26	52	2	0	3	3	0
2016–17	Muskegon Lumberjacks	USHL	58	3	20	23	51	4	1	0	1	2
2017–18	Muskegon Lumberjacks	USHL	59	12	26	38	69	3	2	2	4	4
2018–19	UMass-Amherst	HE	41	13	16	29	26	—	—	—	—	—
2019–20	UMass-Amherst	HE	22	4	11	15	14	—	—	—	—	—
2020–21	UMass-Amherst	HE	27	3	11	14	4	—	—	—	—	—
2020–21	Chicago Wolves	AHL	9	0	5	5	0	—	—	—	—	—
2021–22	Milwaukee Admirals	AHL	67	6	13	19	28	9	0	0	0	4
2022–23	Milwaukee Admirals	AHL	71	3	28	31	50	16	4	8	12	4
2023–24	Milwaukee Admirals	AHL	60	8	26	34	34	15	4	3	7	14
2023–24	Nashville Predators	NHL	9	0	3	3	2	—	—	—	—	—
2024–25	Nashville Predators	NHL	46	2	7	9	21	—	—	—	—	—
2024–25	Milwaukee Admirals	AHL	30	8	4	12	16	10	1	4	5	2
2025–26	Laval Rocket	AHL	63	9	18	27	38	3	0	0	0	0
NHL totals			55	2	10	12	23	—	—	—	—	—
