= Jack Canniff =

American ice hockey coach (1931–2009)

Biographical details
- Born: October 20, 1931; Cambridge, Massachusetts
- Died: August 29, 2009 (aged 77); Danvers, Massachusetts
- Education: Boston College

Playing career
- 1952–1954: Boston College
- Position: Forward

Coaching career (HC unless noted)
- 1956–1967: Gloucester High
- 1967–1979: Massachusetts

Head coaching record
- Overall: 120–140–8 (college)

Accomplishments and honors

Championships
- 1972 ECAC 2 Tournament Champion

Awards
- 1972 Edward Jeremiah Award

John E. Canniff Jr. was an American ice hockey coach and player who led the program at Massachusetts for a dozen years.

== Career ==
Canniff was a multi-sport star at Arlington High School. He made enough of a name for himself that he received some attention from the Brooklyn Dodgers. Canniff chose instead to continue with ice hockey and began attending Boston College in 1950. Canniff played two years for the Eagles under head coach John Kelley and helped the team make the NCAA Tournament as a senior. BC had one of the worst performances in tournament history and lost their two games by a combined score of 3–21.

After graduating, Canniff was drafted into the Army. With the Korean War finished by that time, Canniff was assigned to a base in Germany and served as an umpire. He was sent to Colorado Springs for the US trials in the run-up to the 1956 Winter Olympics but was ultimately left off the team. Canniff left the Army in 1956 and he returned to Massachusetts to become the football and ice hockey coach at Gloucester High School as well as teaching algebra. Canniff remained at the school for over a decade before having his name put forward by John Kelley, his old coach, for the open position at Massachusetts.

While one of the oldest programs in the NCAA, Canniff was taking over a team that seen just two winning seasons in the previous 30 years. After a poor first season, The Redmen responded to their new bench boss and UMass began to improve in the standings. The team posted a winning record in his third season and then finished 3rd out of 28 teams in 1970–71. The next year, Canniff led Massachusetts to its best record since the early 1910s and won the ECAC 2 Tournament. Because it was the only postseason event held at the College Division level, it is seen as a de facto National Championship. Canniff also received the Edward Jeremiah Award as the national coach of the year.

Unfortunately, the team was unable to sustain that level of success and quickly reverted to be a sub-.500 club. The biggest problems for the team were the lack of funding and the lack of an actual home rink. Instead, the team borrowed the Orr Rink, the home for the Amherst Lord Jeffs, or used natural ponds for its playing surface. The cost of upgrading the program was too much for the university at the time and the administration decided the situation was untenable. In 1978 the school chose to end the program after the upcoming year and the resulting team was one of the worst the program had ever fielded. With no recruits and several players transferring away, the Minutemen won just a single game on the year. Still dedicated to the team, Canniff led them through the difficult year and ended his tenure in the college ranks upon the demise of the program.

After his time at UMass, Canniff returned to teaching algebra, this time at South Hadley High School, until his retirement. Hockey did eventually return to UMass after the Mullins Center was built in 1993. Upon the team's return, the program established the 'John Canniff Unsung Hero Award', a team award for a player whose contributions were otherwise going unrecognized. Canniff was inducted into the UMass Athletic Hall of Fame in 2008. About a year later, Canniff died at the age of 77 from cancer.

== Statistics ==
=== Regular season and playoffs ===
			Regular Season					Playoffs
Season	Team	League	GP	G	A	Pts	PIM	GP	G	A	Pts	PIM
1951–52	Boston College	Hockey East	—	—	—	—	—	—	—	—	—	—
1953–54	Boston College	Hockey East	—	—	—	—	—	—	—	—	—	—
NCAA totals			—	23	26	49	—	—	—	—	—	—

== Head coaching record ==
Record table
Season	Team	Overall	Conference	Standing	Postseason
Massachusetts Redmen (ECAC 2) (1967–1972)
1967–68	Massachusetts	5–15–0	5–11–0	T-16th	
1968–69	Massachusetts	9–12–0	8–10–0	16th	
1969–70	Massachusetts	10–8–0	10–5–0	10th	
1970–71	Massachusetts	14–6–1	12–3–1	3rd	ECAC 2 Semifinals
1971–72	Massachusetts	19–7–0	15–3–0	T–2nd	ECAC 2 Champion
Massachusetts:		57–48–1	50–32–1		
Massachusetts Minutemen (ECAC 2) (1972–1979)
1972–73	Massachusetts	14–11–2	12–4–2	5th	ECAC 2 Semifinals
1973–74	Massachusetts	10–12–1	10–6–0	6th	ECAC 2 Semifinals
1974–75	Massachusetts	10–14–1	9–9–1	T–11th	
1975–76	Massachusetts	12–13–0	12–8–0	9th	
1976–77	Massachusetts	8–13–1	8–11–1	T–17th	
1977–78	Massachusetts	8–11–1	8–11–1	19th	
1978–79	Massachusetts	1–18–1	1–18–1	33rd	
Massachusetts:		63–92–7	60–67–6		
Total:		120–140–8			
National champion Postseason invitational champion Conference regular season champion Conference regular season and conference tournament champion Division regular season champion Division regular season and conference tournament champion Conference tournament champion

Awards and achievements
Preceded by Sid Watson	Edward Jeremiah Award; 1971–72	Succeeded by Jim Cross
