= UMass Minutemen ice hockey =

Men's college ice hockey program

- Current season
- University: University of Massachusetts Amherst
- Conference: Hockey East
- First season: 1908–09; 118 years ago
- Head coach: Greg Carvel; 10th season, 170–133–25 (.556)
- Assistant coaches: Nolan Gluchowski; Steve Mastalerz
- Captain(s): Owen Murray; Lucas Ölvestad
- Arena: Mullins Center; Amherst, Massachusetts
- Student section: The Militia
- Colors: Maroon and white

NCAA tournament champions
- 2021

NCAA tournament runner-up
- 2019

NCAA tournament Frozen Four
- 2019, 2021

NCAA tournament appearances
- 2007, 2019, 2021, 2022, 2024, 2025

Conference tournament champions
- ECAC 2: 1972; Hockey East: 2021, 2022

Conference regular season champions
- Hockey East: 2019

The UMass Minutemen Ice Hockey team is a National Collegiate Athletic Association (NCAA) Division I men's college ice hockey program that represents the University of Massachusetts Amherst. The Minutemen are a member of Hockey East. They play at the 8,387-seat William D. Mullins Memorial Center (known as the Mullins Center) in Amherst, Massachusetts.

== History ==
=== Pond history ===
The centrally located pond on the UMass campus was once used for multiple purposes. In the winter students and faculty would cut out blocks of ice to use for refrigeration and annual tug-of-war games between sophomores and freshmen were hosted during the spring months. In 1909 the first formal ice hockey team began playing on the pond as well. UMass fielded one of the earliest non-Ivy League programs, playing continually until poor weather conditions and a lack of funding caused the team to cease in 1939. The Minutemen were able to return to the ice after the war but couldn't play at home until 1954.

The lack of a home venue caused the team to suffer through a stretch where they won only 2 games over a 7-year period. Eventually the pond became usable again and UMass were able to play home games with new head coach Steve Kosakowski. The Minutemen performed decently in his 13 seasons and were among 28 teams to found ECAC Hockey. In 1964 the ECAC split into two divisions and any program that did not possess a dedicated indoor arena was placed in ECAC 2. UMass continued with the second-tier conference for 15 years and achieved their greatest success in 1972 under Jack Canniff, winning the conference tournament title.

By the end of the 1970s using the pond as a rink had become untenable and when no alternatives surfaced the program was shuttered.

=== Return to the Ice ===
When the Mullins Center opened in 1993 it was designed as a multi-purpose arena and allowed for the university to rekindle its ice hockey program. The men's team started the same year and hit the ice as a Division I independent. With 20 wins in the first season under Joe Mallen, there was hope that the Minutemen could compete in Hockey East. However, once they began a tougher schedule in 1994–95, the team lost a then-school-record 28 games. Though the team rarely finished last in the conference under Mallen, there were very few gains and he was replaced by Don Cahoon in 2000.

Under Cahoon the team began to improve, posting a winning season in 2003 and reaching the conference championship game the following year. His greatest success came after recruiting Jonathan Quick, who helped UMass to reach their first ever NCAA tournament in 2007. Cahoon couldn't keep the success going, however, and after being knocked off in five consecutive conference quarterfinals he retired in 2012.

John Micheletto was tabbed as Cahoon's successor and after a decent first season the team slid down the standing and bottomed out for two consecutive seasons. After the second last-place finish Micheletto was fired and replaced by St. Lawrence head coach Greg Carvel.

=== Greg Carvel era (2016–present) ===
In Carvel's first season the team reached a nadir; the Minutemen set a new program record for futility, losing 29 games. Carvel led the team to a much-improved finish in his second season and then team took off in year three. The Minutemen reached their first ever Frozen Four and a berth in the 2019 NCAA Division I National Championship in which the Minutemen ultimately lost to Minnesota-Duluth 3–0. Though the year ended on a sour note, the team posted a new program record for wins (31) while Cale Makar won the school's first Hobey Baker Award.

On April 10, 2021, the Minutemen won their first-ever NCAA Division I men's ice hockey tournament, beating the St. Cloud State Huskies 5–0.

== Season-by-season results ==
Source:

== Records vs. current Hockey East teams ==
As of the completion of 2022–23 season

School	Team	Away Arena	Overall record	Win %	Last Result
Boston College	Eagles	Conte Forum	17–74–4	.200	-
Boston University	Terriers	Agganis Arena	14–70–8	.196	-
University of Connecticut	Huskies	Toscano Family Ice Forum	43–18–4	.692	-
University of Maine	Black Bears	Alfond Arena	28–58–10	.344	-
University of Massachusetts Lowell	River Hawks	Tsongas Center	36–50–9	.426	-
Merrimack College	Warriors	J. Thom Lawler Rink	51–45–8	.529	-
University of New Hampshire	Wildcats	Whittemore Center	29–93–12	.261	-
Northeastern University	Huskies	Matthews Arena	37–57–10	.404	-
Providence College	Friars	Schneider Arena	35–52–8	.411	-
University of Vermont	Catamounts	Gutterson Fieldhouse	32–44–10	.430	-

== Coaching staff ==
Current as of April, 2026.

2025-2026 Staff
Name	Position
Greg Carvel	Head Coach
Vacant	Associate Head Coach
Nolan Gluchowski	Assistant Coach
Steve Mastalerz	Director of Player Development
Hunter Diehl	Director of Hockey Operations
Marc Paquet	Athletic Trainer
Mike Vaughan	Sports Performance Coach
Josh Penn	Head of Equipment

=== All-time coaching records ===
As of the completion of 2024–25 season

Tenure	Coach	Years	Record	Pct.
1908–1917	No Coach	9	39–27–3	.587
1917–1922	Elton J. Mansell	5	18–13–3	.574
1922–1923	Herbert Collins	1	3–4–2	.444
1923–1924	Howard R. Gordon	1	3–6–0	.333
1924–1939	Lorin Ball	15	47–61–7	.439
1947–1949	Tommy Filmore	2	0–5–0	.000
1949–1950	Walt Fitzgerald	1	2–3–2	.429
1950–1951	Bill Needham	1	0–7–0	.000
1953–1954	Mel Massucco	1	0–9–1	.050
1954–1967	Steve Kosakowski	13	73–118–4	.385
1967–1979	Jack Canniff	12	120–140–8	.463
1993–2000	Joe Mallen	7	77–144–18	.360
2000–2012	Don Cahoon	12	166–229–42	.428
2012–2016	John Micheletto	4	39–88–13	.325
2016–Present	Greg Carvel	9	170–133–25	.556
Totals	14 coaches	93 seasons	757–987–128	.439

== Current roster ==
As of September 18, 2025.

No.	Nat.	Player	Class	Pos	Height	Weight	DoB	Hometown	Previous team	NHL rights
1	(United States)	Jackson Irving	Junior	G	6' 0" (1.83 m)	172 lb (78 kg)	2004-02-03	Newbury, Massachusetts	Sioux Falls Stampede (USHL)	—
2	(United States)	Coleson Hanrahan	Freshman	D	5' 10" (1.78 m)	187 lb (85 kg)	2005-04-16	Longmeadow, Massachusetts	Youngstown Phantoms (USHL)	—
4	(United States)	Kennedy O'Connor	Senior	D	6' 2" (1.88 m)	194 lb (88 kg)	2001-05-10	Springfield, Massachusetts	Omaha Lancers (USHL)	—
6	(Sweden)	Lucas Ölvestad (C)	Senior	D	6' 1" (1.85 m)	190 lb (86 kg)	2002-03-19	Stockholm, Sweden	Denver (NCHC)	—
7	(Canada)	Owen Mehlenbacher	Junior	F	6' 2" (1.88 m)	189 lb (86 kg)	2004-01-26	Fort Erie, Ontario	Wisconsin (Big Ten)	DET, 201st overall 2022
8	(United States)	Cam O'Neill	Junior	F	6' 0" (1.83 m)	183 lb (83 kg)	2004-01-24	Odenton, Maryland	Tri-City Storm (USHL)	OTT, 143rd overall 2022
9	(United States)	Jack Musa	Junior	F	5' 9" (1.75 m)	157 lb (71 kg)	2003-07-22	Orange Park, Florida	Cedar Rapids RoughRiders (USHL)	—
10	(United States)	Jack Galanek	Freshman	F	6' 0" (1.83 m)	176 lb (80 kg)	2006-06-04	Hopkinton, Massachusetts	Muskegon Lumberjacks (USHL)	—
11	(Czech Republic)	Václav Nestrašil	Freshman	F	6' 6" (1.98 m)	190 lb (86 kg)	2007-04-06	Prague, Czech Republic	Muskegon Lumberjacks (USHL)	CHI, 25th overall 2025
12	(Slovakia)	Lukáš Klečka	Freshman	F	5' 11" (1.8 m)	179 lb (81 kg)	2005-04-12	Bratislava, Slovakia	Södertälje SK J20 (J20 Nationell)	—
13	(United States)	Landon Nycz	Freshman	D	6' 3" (1.91 m)	201 lb (91 kg)	2007-10-04	Detroit, Michigan	Sioux City Musketeers (USHL)	—
14	(United States)	A. J. Lacroix	Freshman	F	6' 0" (1.83 m)	194 lb (88 kg)	2005-04-25	Livingston, New Jersey	Brooks Bandits (BCHL)	—
15	(United States)	Justin Kerr	Freshman	F	6' 5" (1.96 m)	205 lb (93 kg)	2004-01-08	Grand Rapids, Minnesota	Youngstown Phantoms (USHL)	—
17	(Slovakia)	Daniel Jenčko	Sophomore	F	5' 9" (1.75 m)	165 lb (75 kg)	2005-01-09	Humenné, Slovakia	Youngstown Phantoms (USHL)	—
18	(Canada)	Larry Keenan	Sophomore	D	6' 3" (1.91 m)	185 lb (84 kg)	2005-03-15	Midhurst, Ontario	Penticton Vees (BCHL)	DET, 117th overall 2024
19	(United States)	Mikey DeAngelo	Sophomore	F	5' 11" (1.8 m)	198 lb (90 kg)	2004-11-19	Itasca, Illinois	Michigan State (Big Ten)	—
20	(United States)	James Duerr	Sophomore	F	6' 2" (1.88 m)	190 lb (86 kg)	2004-09-01	Chicago, Illinois	Green Bay Gamblers	—
21	(United States)	Charlie Lieberman	Sophomore	D	5' 11" (1.8 m)	187 lb (85 kg)	2003-05-22	Naperville, Illinois	Omaha Lancers (USHL)	—
22	(United States)	Nick Van Tassell	Junior	F	6' 4" (1.93 m)	196 lb (89 kg)	2004-04-18	Basking Ridge, New Jersey	Green Bay Gamblers (USHL)	OTT, 215th overall 2023
23	(Canada)	Francesco Dell'Elce	Sophomore	D	6' 0" (1.83 m)	181 lb (82 kg)	2005-01-09	King City, Ontario	Penticton Vees (BCHL)	COL, 77th overall 2025
24	(Sweden)	Elias Zimmerman	Freshman	F	6' 6" (1.98 m)	216 lb (98 kg)	2005-08-08	Gävle, Sweden	Fargo Force (USHL)	—
25	(United States)	Cam Dunn	Sophomore	F	6' 2" (1.88 m)	170 lb (77 kg)	2003-10-08	Holland, Michigan	Odessa Jackalopes (NAHL)	—
26	(Canada)	Owen Murray (C)	Senior	D	5' 10" (1.78 m)	181 lb (82 kg)	2002-12-01	Decker, Manitoba	Green Bay Gamblers (USHL)	—
28	(United States)	Bo Cosman	Junior	F	6' 3" (1.91 m)	192 lb (87 kg)	2002-01-18	Milton, Georgia	Minnesota Wilderness (NAHL)	—
29	(Canada)	Matthew Wilde	Junior	D	6' 2" (1.88 m)	198 lb (90 kg)	2002-04-30	Mississauga, Ontario	RIT (AHA)	—
30	(Czech Republic)	Michael Hrabal	Junior	G	6' 6" (1.98 m)	209 lb (95 kg)	2005-01-20	Prague, Czech Republic	Omaha Lancers (USHL)	UTA, 38th overall 2023
32	(Canada)	James Norton	Sophomore	G	6' 4" (1.93 m)	183 lb (83 kg)	2003-04-16	Scarborough, Ontario	Cedar Rapids RoughRiders (USHL)	—

== The Longest Game ==
On March 6, 2015, UMass faced Notre Dame in Game 1 of the Opening Round of the 2015 Hockey East Men's Ice Hockey Tournament, played at Compton Family Ice Arena at Notre Dame. Early into the game, Sam Herr gave Notre Dame the lead on a rebounded shot. Vince Hinostroza made it 2–0 midway through the second period. But the Minutmen responded two minutes later with a power play goal by Steven Iacobellis. Notre Dame responded three minutes later with a Steven Fogarty goal to make it 3–1. UMass made it 3–2 a minute later with a goal by Shane Walsh. With two seconds remaining in the period, Troy Power tipped a power play goal to tie the game as the second period (a period that had five goals in total) ended. The third period ended with no goals, as the two teams went into overtime. The two teams repeatedly failed to score, with UMass shooting a record 91 times and Notre Dame shooting 78 times. With 8:18 left in the fifth overtime and at 1:24 a.m. ET, Shane Walsh scored the game-winning goal to end the longest Division I hockey game which had lasted 151 minutes, 42 seconds, besting the previous record of 150:22, set by Quinnipiac and Union in 2010.

Steve Mastalerz finished the night with 75 saves for UMass while Cal Petersen of Notre Dame made 87 saves, setting a new NCAA record. It was UMass' first win at the Tournament since March 13, 2009 at Northeastern.

== Championships ==
NCAA Tournament championships

Tournament	Score	Opponent	City	Arena
2021	5–0	St. Cloud State	Pittsburgh, Pennsylvania	PPG Paints Arena

Conference tournament championships

Tournament	Conference	Score	Opponent
1972	ECAC 2	8–1	Buffalo
2021	Hockey East	1–0	Massachusetts–Lowell
2022	Hockey East	2–1 (OT)	Connecticut

== Awards and honors ==
=== NCAA ===
==== Individual awards ====
Hobey Baker Award

- Cale Makar: 2019

Edward Jeremiah Award

- Jack Canniff: 1972

Spencer Penrose Award

- Greg Carvel: 2019

NCAA tournament Most Outstanding Player

- Bobby Trivigno: 2021

==== All-Americans ====
AHCA First Team All-Americans

- 1971–72: Pat Keenan, F; Brian Sullivan, D; P.J. Flaherty, G
- 1972–73: Pat Keenan, F
- 2003–04: Thomas Pöck, D
- 2018–19: Cale Makar, D; Mitchell Chaffee, F
- 2019–20: John Leonard, F
- 2020–21: Bobby Trivigno, F
- 2021–22: Bobby Trivigno, F; Scott Morrow, D
- 2023–24: Ryan Ufko, D
- 2024–25: Cole O'Hara, F
- 2025-26: Michael Hrabal, G

AHCA Second Team All-Americans

- 2006–07: Jonathan Quick, G
- 2008–09: James Marcou, F
- 2009–10: Justin Braun, D
- 2020–21: Zac Jones, D
- 2025-26: Jack Musa, F

NCAA Division I Men's Ice Hockey All-Tournament Team

- 2018–19: Marc Del Gaizo, D
- 2020–21: Bobby Trivigno, F; Matthew Kessel, D; Zac Jones, D; Filip Lindberg, G

=== Hockey East ===
==== Individual awards ====
Player of the Year

- Cale Makar: 2019
- Bobby Trivigno: 2022
- Michael Hrabal: 2026

Hockey East Rookie of the Year

- Josh Lopina: 2021

Hockey East Goaltending Champion

- Michael Hrabal: 2026

Three-Stars Award

- John Leonard: 2020

Scoring Champion

- James Marcou: 2009
- Mitchell Chaffee: 2019
- Bobby Trivigno: 2022

Best Defensive Defenseman

- Justin Braun: 2010

Len Ceglarski Award

- Ryan Ufko: 2024

Bob Kullen Coach of the Year

- Don Cahoon: 2003
- Greg Carvel: 2019

William Flynn Tournament Most Valuable Player

- Bobby Trivigno: 2021, 2022

==== All-Hockey East ====
First Team

- 2003–04: Thomas Pöck, D
- 2008–09: James Marcou, F
- 2009–10: Justin Braun, D
- 2018–19: Cale Makar, D; Mitchell Chaffee, F
- 2019–20: John Leonard, F
- 2020–21: Bobby Trivigno, F
- 2021–22: Bobby Trivigno, F; Scott Morrow, D
- 2023–24: Ryan Ufko, D
- 2024–25: Cole O'Hara, F
- 2025–26: Michael Hrabal, G

Second Team

- 2002–03: Thomas Pöck, D
- 2005–06: Marvin Degon, D
- 2006–07: Jonathan Quick, G
- 2007–08: Mike Kostka, D
- 2008–09: Justin Braun, D
- 2009–10: James Marcou, F
- 2018–19: John Leonard, F; Jacob Pritchard, F
- 2020–21: Filip Lindberg, G; Zac Jones, D
- 2022–23: Scott Morrow, D; Ryan Ufko, D
- 2023–24: Michael Hrabal, G
- 2025–26: Jack Musa, F; Larry Keenan, D

Third Team

- 2017–18: Cale Makar, D
- 2018–19: Marc Del Gaizo, D; Mario Ferraro, D
- 2019–20: Jake McLaughlin, D
- 2020–21: Marc Del Gaizo, D; Matthew Kessel, D
- 2021–22: Matthew Kessel, D; Matt Murray, G
- 2023–24: Scott Morrow
- 2024–25: Michael Hrabal, G

Rookie Team

- 1994–95: Brian Regan, G
- 2002–03: Stephen Werner, D
- 2004–05: David Leaderer, D; P. J. Fenton, F
- 2006–07: Justin Braun, D
- 2007–08: Paul Dainton, G; James Marcou, F
- 2008–09: Casey Wellman, F
- 2010–11: Michael Pereira, F
- 2014–15: Brandon Montour, F
- 2017–18: Cale Makar, D; Mario Ferraro, D
- 2018–19: Marc Del Gaizo, D
- 2019–20: Zac Jones, D
- 2020–21: Josh Lopina, F
- 2021–22: Scott Morrow, D; Ryan Ufko, D
- 2022–23: Kenny Connors, F
- 2024–25: Francesco Dell'Elce, D

All-Tournament Team

- 2002–03: Thomas Pöck, D; Stephen Werner, F
- 2003–04: Thomas Pöck, D; Greg Mauldin, F; Mike Warner, F
- 2006–07: Chris Capraro, F
- 2020–21: Filip Lindberg, G; Zac Jones, D; Jake Gaudet, F; Bobby Trivigno, F
- 2021–22: Matt Murray, G; Colin Felix, D; Garrett Wait, F; Bobby Trivigno, F
- 2022–23: Scott Morrow

== Statistical leaders ==
=== Career points leaders ===
Player	Years	GP	G	A	Pts	PIM
Pat Keenan	1970–1973	66	105	75	180	147
Rob Bonneau	1993–1997	131	72	94	166	219
Warren Norris	1993–1997	132	73	81	154	158
Bobby Trivigno	2018–2022	139	53	78	131	91
James Marcou	2007–2010	111	34	96	130	90
Stephen Werner	2002–2006	143	50	66	116	60
Michael Pereira	2010–2014	135	53	54	107	72
Tim Turner	1999–2003	134	47	60	107	110
John Leonard	2017–2020	104	56	49	105	42
Conor Sheary	2010–2014	138	38	66	104	53
Thomas Pöck	2000–2004	130	44	58	102	179
Jack Musa†	2023-Present	111	46	54	100	18

† - active

=== Career goaltending leaders ===
GP = Games played; Min = Minutes played; W = Wins; L = Losses; T = Ties; GA = Goals against; SO = Shutouts; SV% = Save percentage; GAA = Goals against average

Minimum 30 games played

Player	Years	GP	Min	W	L	T	GA	SO	SV%	GAA
Filip Lindberg	2018–2021	50	2802	29	10	6	74	11	.937	1.58
Matt Murray	2017–2022	121	6983	73	39	4	260	14	.916	2.23
Michael Hrabal	2023–2026	95	5636	54	33	7	217	8	.925	2.31
Jonathan Quick	2005–2007	54	3129	23	22	6	125	3	.926	2.40
Paul Dainton	2007–2011	123	7042	45	61	12	327	2	.908	2.78
Gabe Winer	2002–2006	117	6725	50	52	10	317	5	.891	2.83

Statistics current through the end of the 2025–26 season.

== Olympians ==
This is a list of Massachusetts alumni were a part of an Olympic team.

Name	Position	Massachusetts Tenure	Team	Year	Finish
Dans Ločmelis	Center	2023–2025	Latvia	2026	10th
John Lyons	Center	1918, 1921–1922	(United States) USA	1924	Silver
Justin McCarthy	Right Wing	1918–1921	(United States) USA	1924	Silver
Cale Makar	Defenseman	2017–2019	Canada	2026	Silver
Thomas Pöck	Defenseman	2001–2004	Austria	2002, 2014	12th, 10th
Jonathan Quick	Goaltender	2005–2007	(United States) USA	2010, 2014	Silver, 4th

== Minutemen in the NHL ==
As of July 1, 2025

= NHL All-Star team	= NHL All-Star	= NHL All-Star and NHL All-Star team	= Hall of Famers

Player	Position	Team(s)	Years	Games	Stanley Cups
Conor Allen	Defenseman	NYR	2013–2015	7	0
Matt Anderson	Forward	NJD	2012–2013	2	0
Kevin Boyle	Goaltender	ANA	2018–2019	5	0
Justin Braun	Defenseman	SJS, PHI, NYR	2010–2023	842	0
Mitchell Chaffee	Right Wing	MIN, TBL	2021–Present	105	0
Marc Del Gaizo	Defenseman	NSH	2023–2025	55	0
Mario Ferraro	Defenseman	SJS	2019–Present	462	0
Joel Hanley	Defenseman	MTL, ARI, DAL, CGY	2015–Present	298	0
Matt Irwin	Defenseman	SJS, BOS, NSH, ANA, BUF, WSH	2012–2023	461	0
Zac Jones	Defenseman	NYR, BUF	2020–Present	115	0
Matt Kessel	Defenseman	STL	2022–Present	91	0
Michael Kostka	Defenseman	TOR, CHI, TBL, NYR, OTT	2012–2016	85	0
William Lagesson	Defenseman	EDM, MTL, TOR, ANA, DET	2019–2025	107	0
John Leonard	Forward	SJS, NSH, ARI, DET	2020–Present	79	0

Player	Position	Team(s)	Years	Games	Stanley Cups
Cale Makar	Defenseman	COL	2018–Present	449	1
Greg Mauldin	Left Wing	CBJ, NYI, COL	2003–2011	36	0
Brandon Montour	Defenseman	ANA, BUF, FLA, SEA	2016–Present	637	1
Scott Morrow	Defenseman	CAR, NYR	2023–Present	44	0
Matt Murray	Goaltender	DAL	2022–2024	4	0
Brad Norton	Defenseman	FLA, LAK, WSH, OTT, DET	2001–2007	124	0
Thomas Pöck	Defenseman	NYR, NYI	2003–2009	118	0
Jonathan Quick	Goaltender	LAK, VGK, NYR	2007–Present	823	3
Conor Sheary	Left Wing	PIT, BUF, WSH, TBL, NYR	2015–Present	630	2
Aydar Suniev	Left wing	CGY	2024–Present	1	0
Ryan Ufko	Defenseman	NSH	2024–Present	1	0
Frank Vatrano	Center	BOS, FLA, NYR, ANA	2015–Present	683	0
Taylor Makar	Left wing	COL	2025-Present	11	0
Casey Wellman	Center	MIN, WSH	2009–2014	54	0

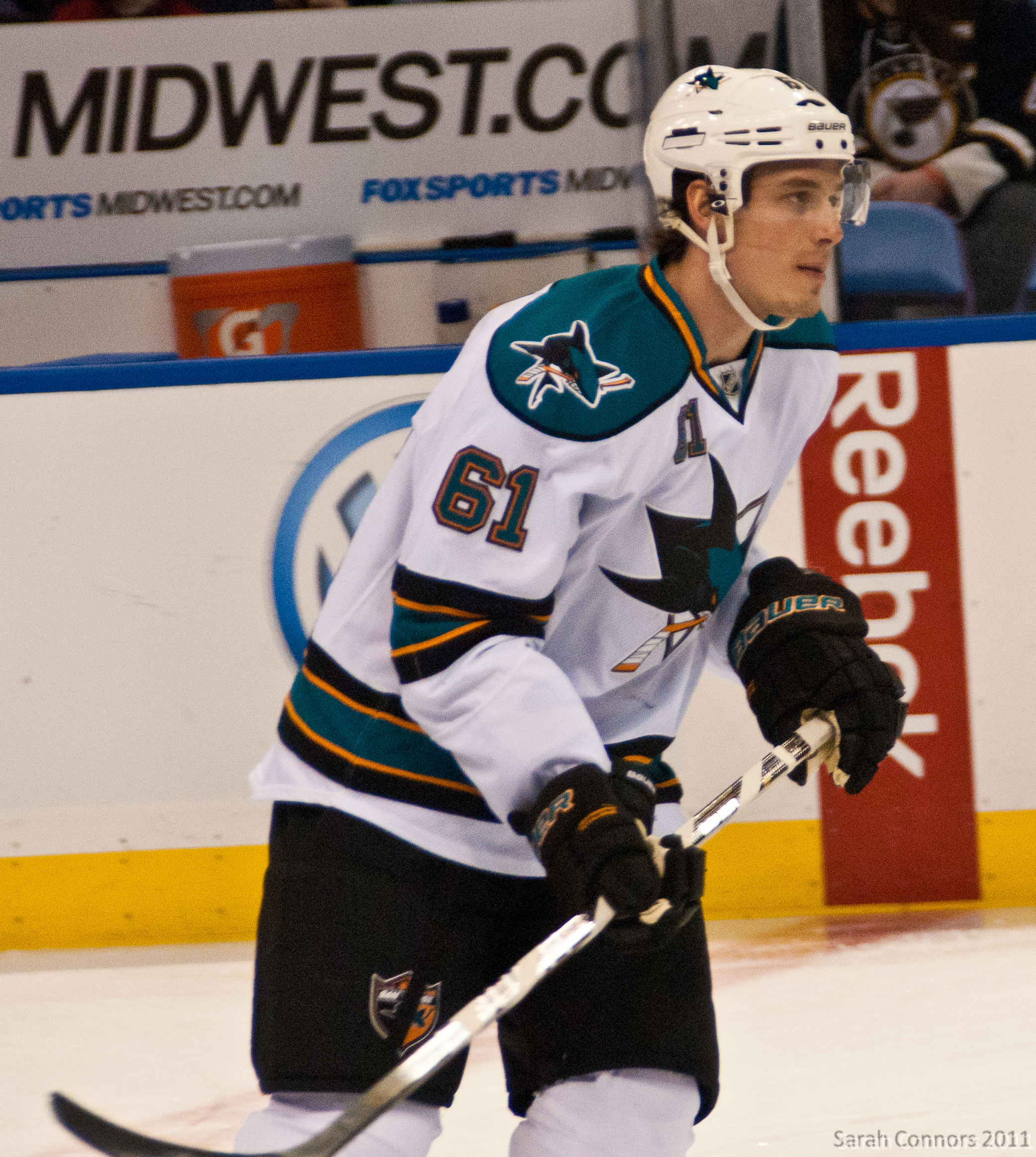
Justin Braun

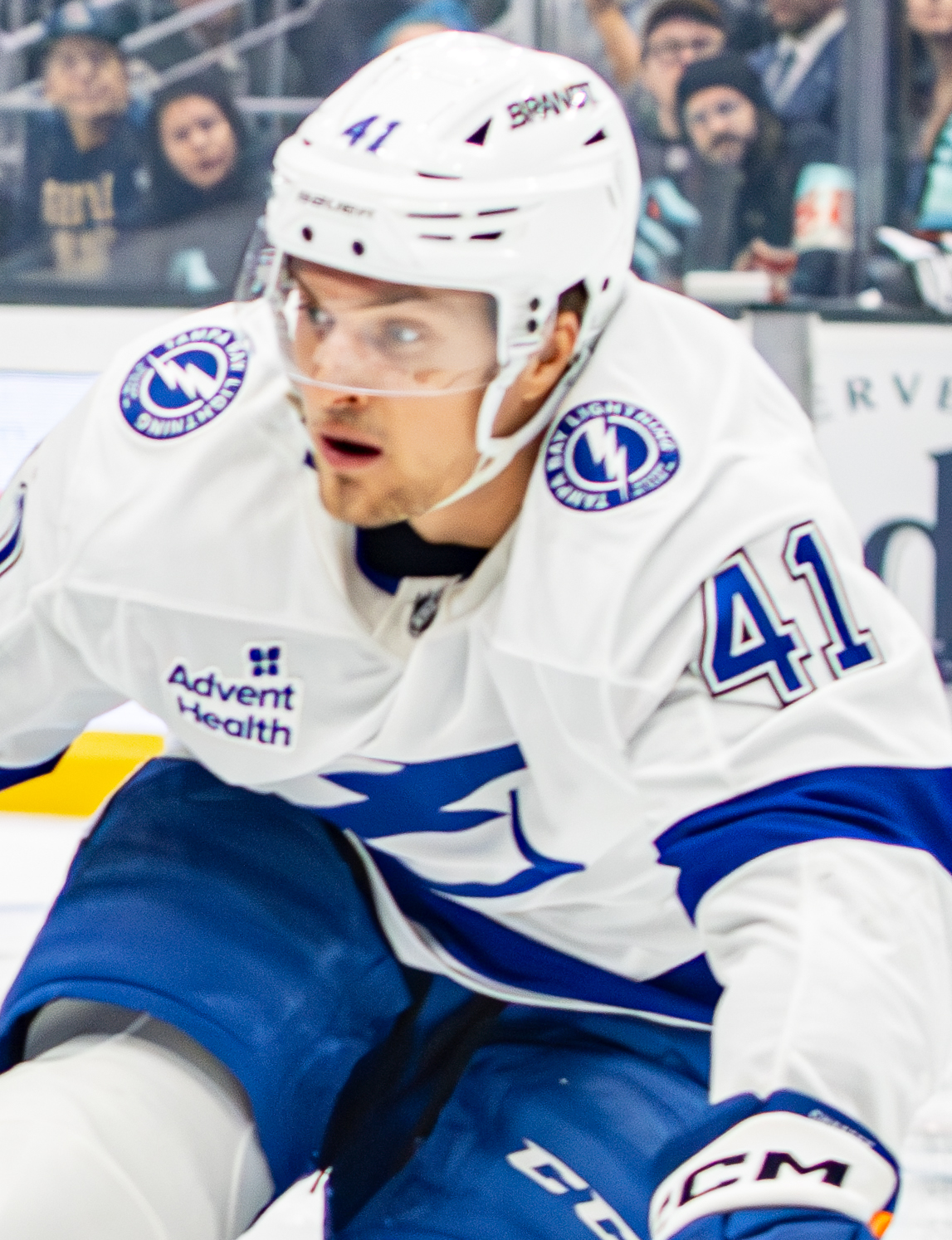
Mitchell Chaffee

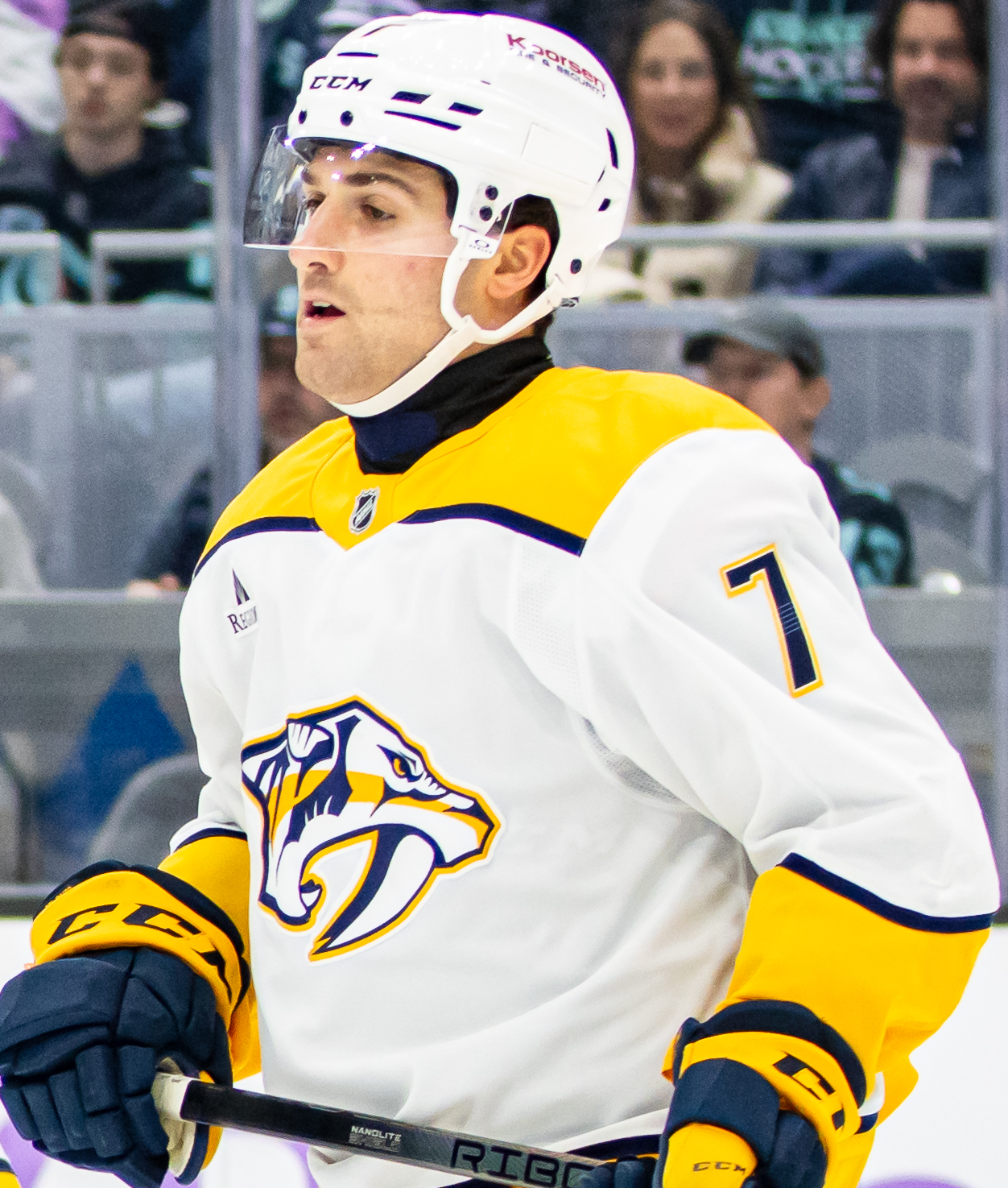
Marc Del Gaizo

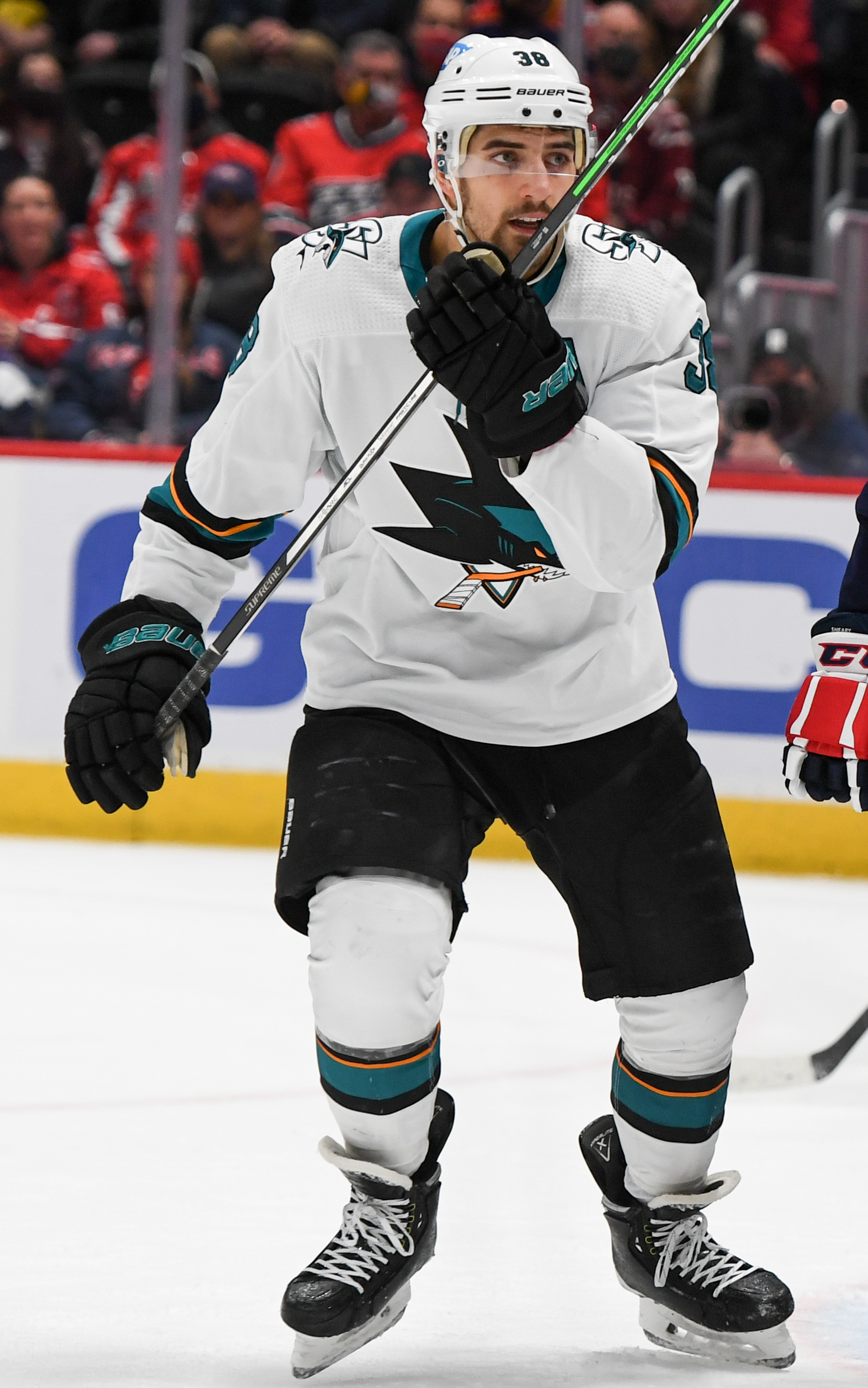
Mario Ferraro

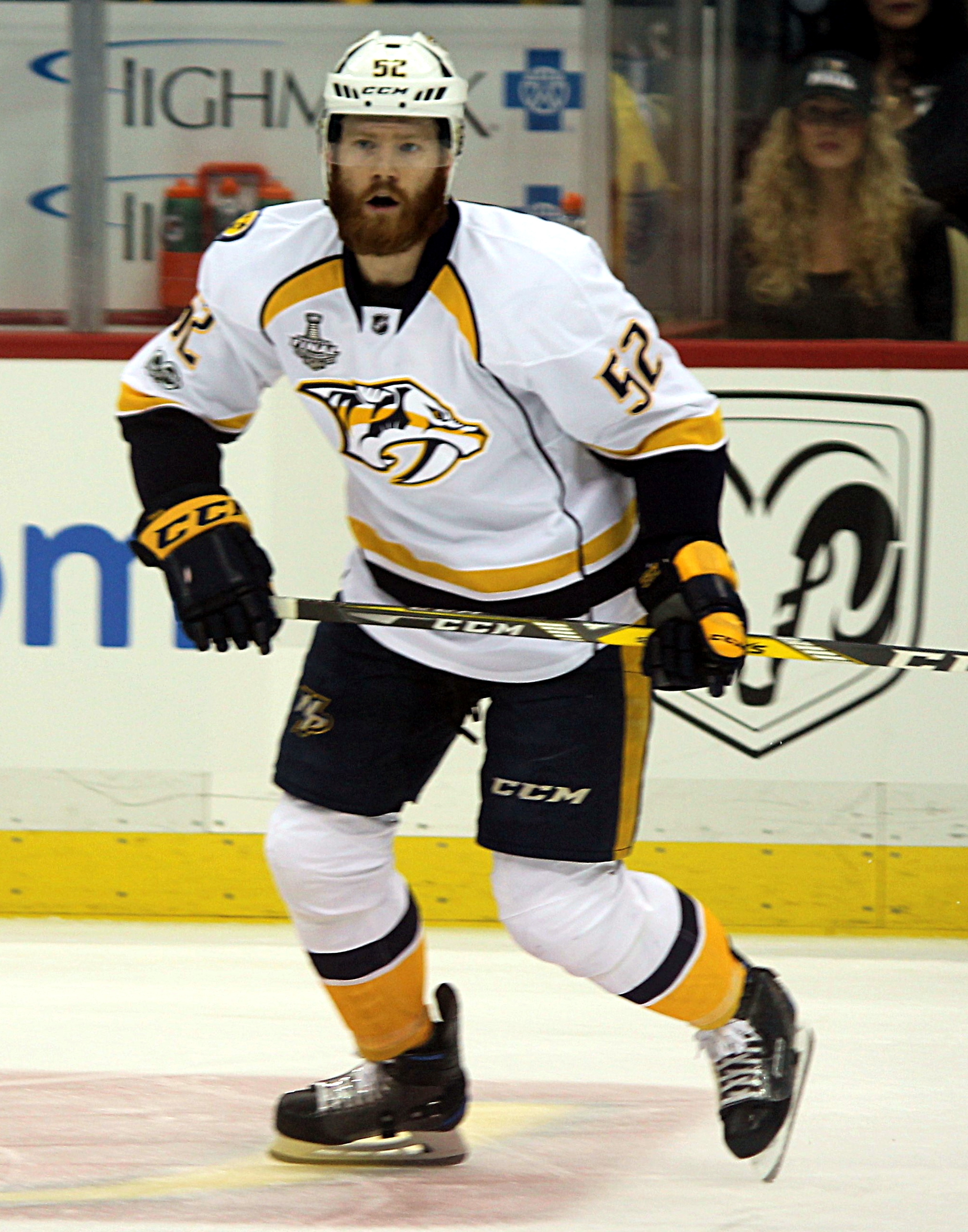
Matt Irwin

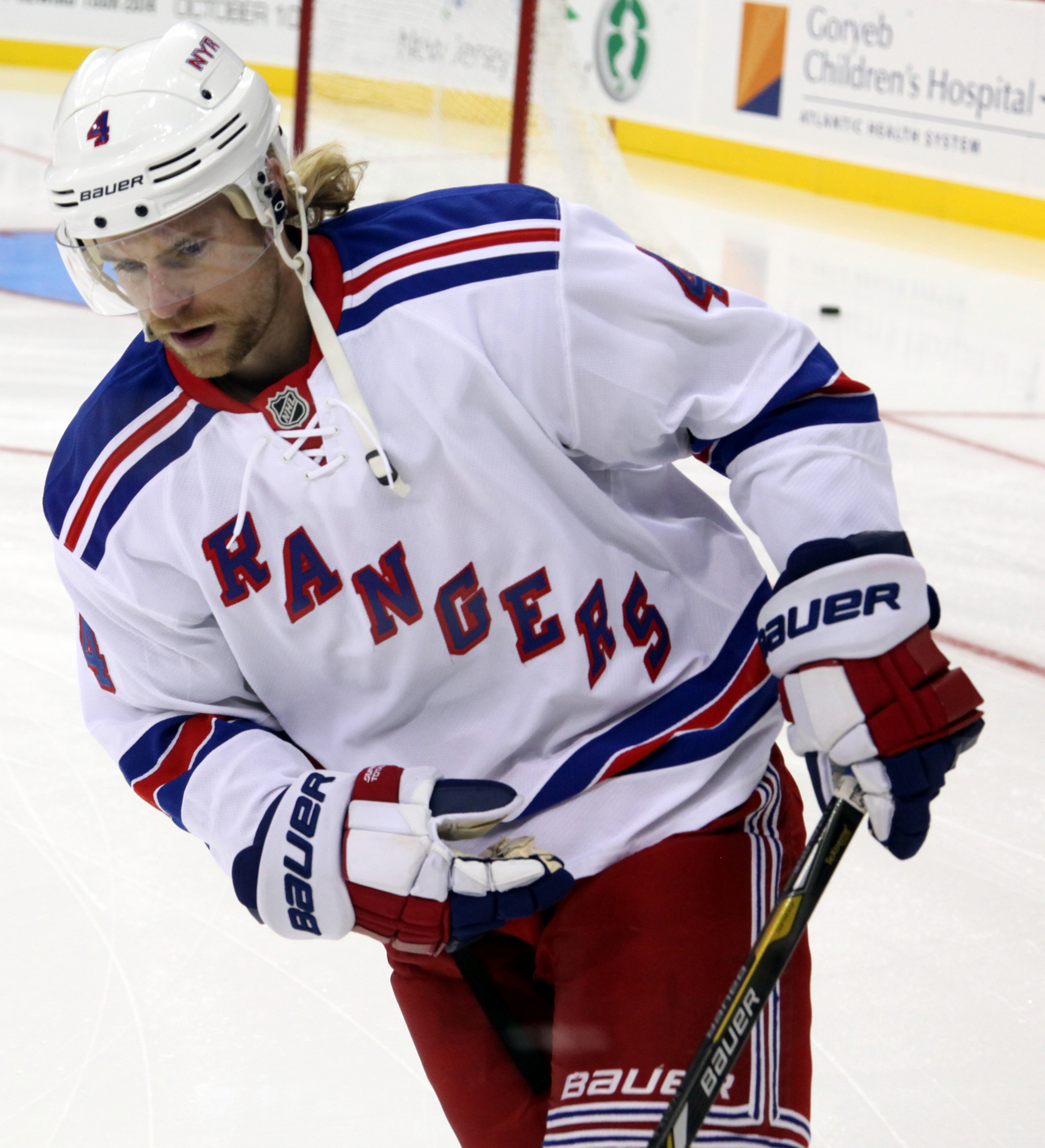
Michael Kostka

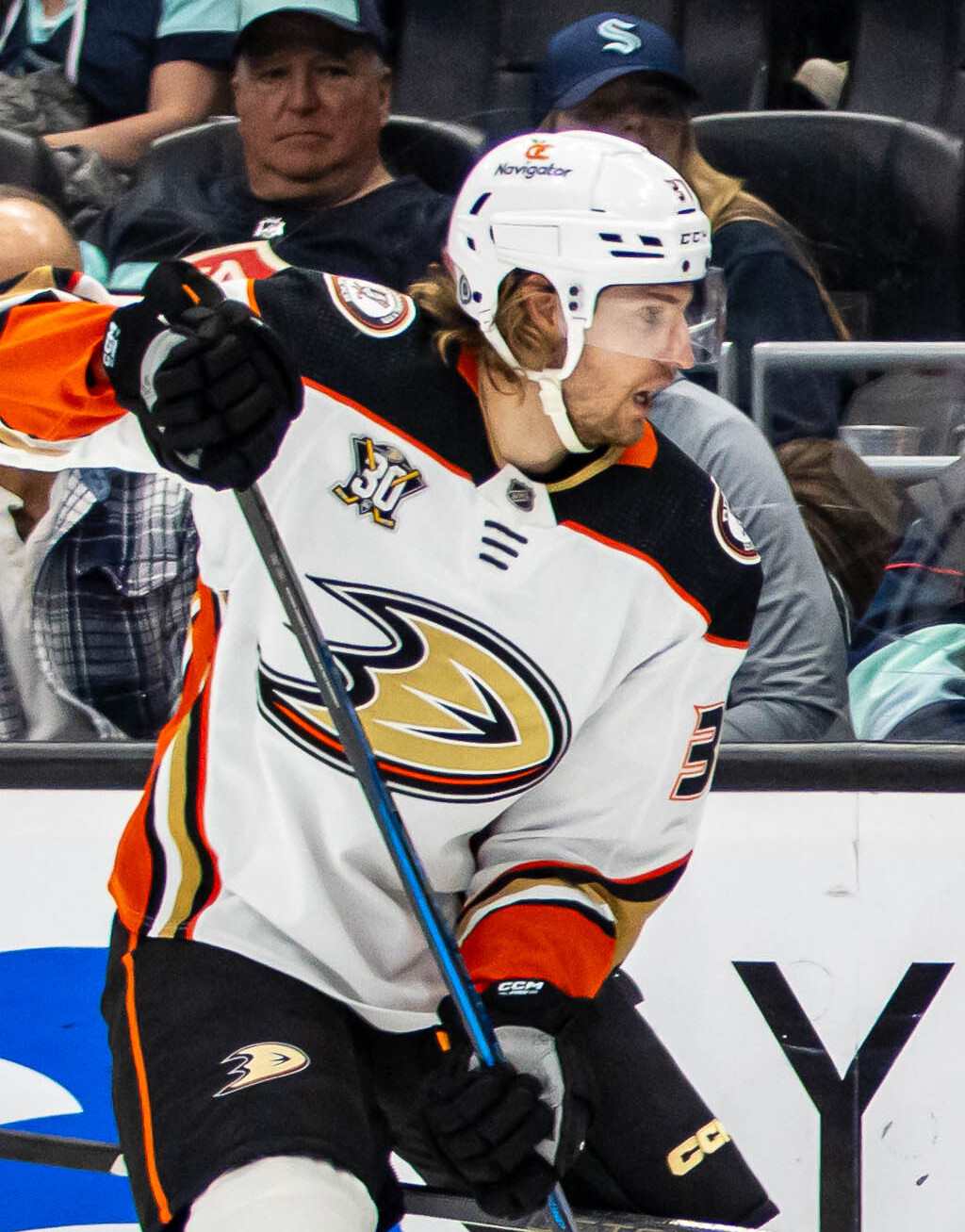
William Lagesson

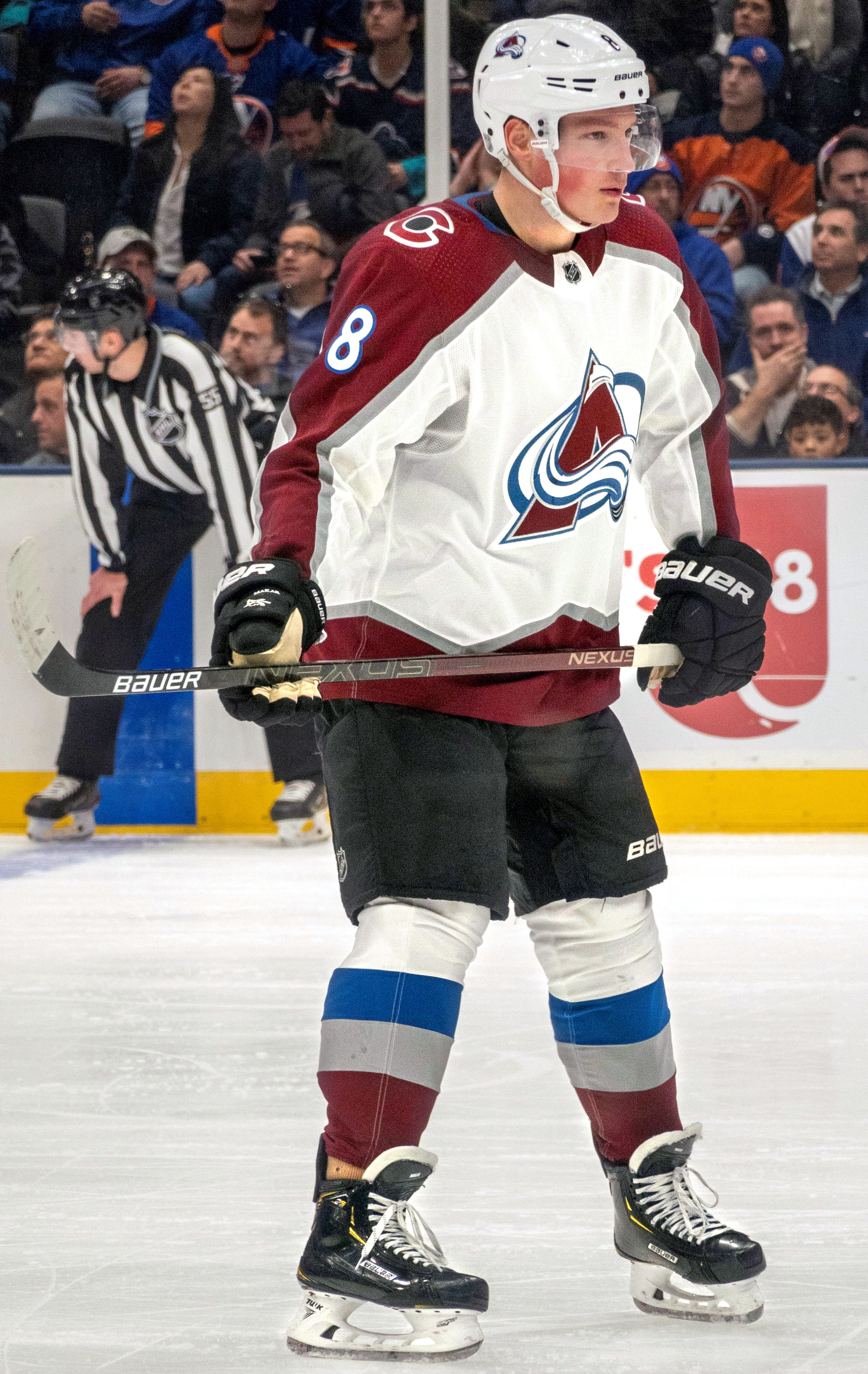
Cale Makar

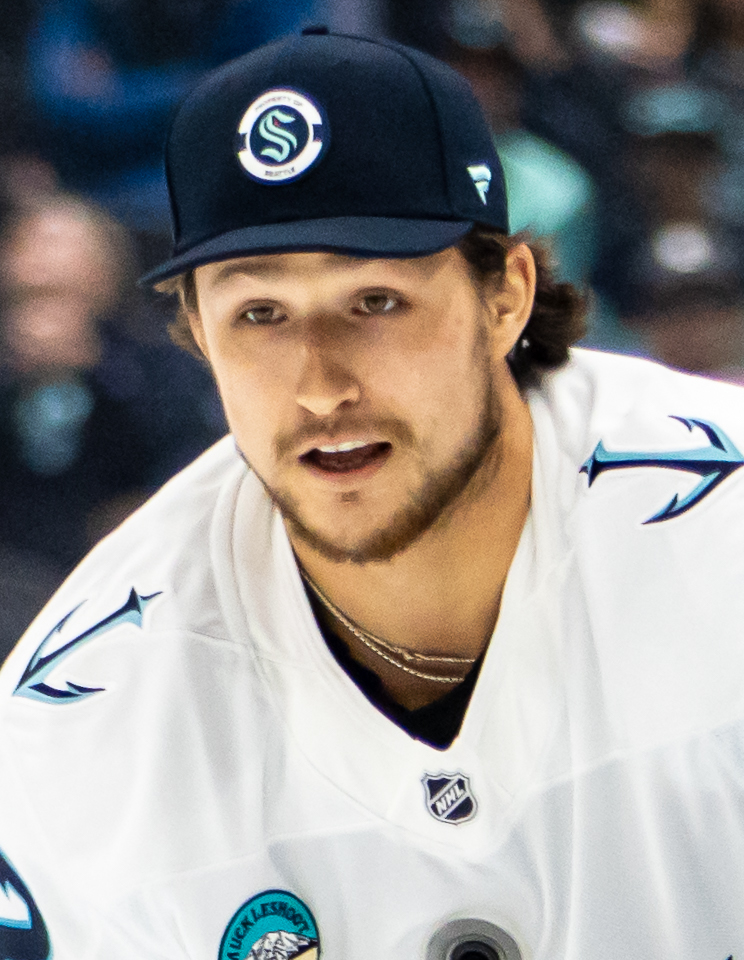
Brandon Montour

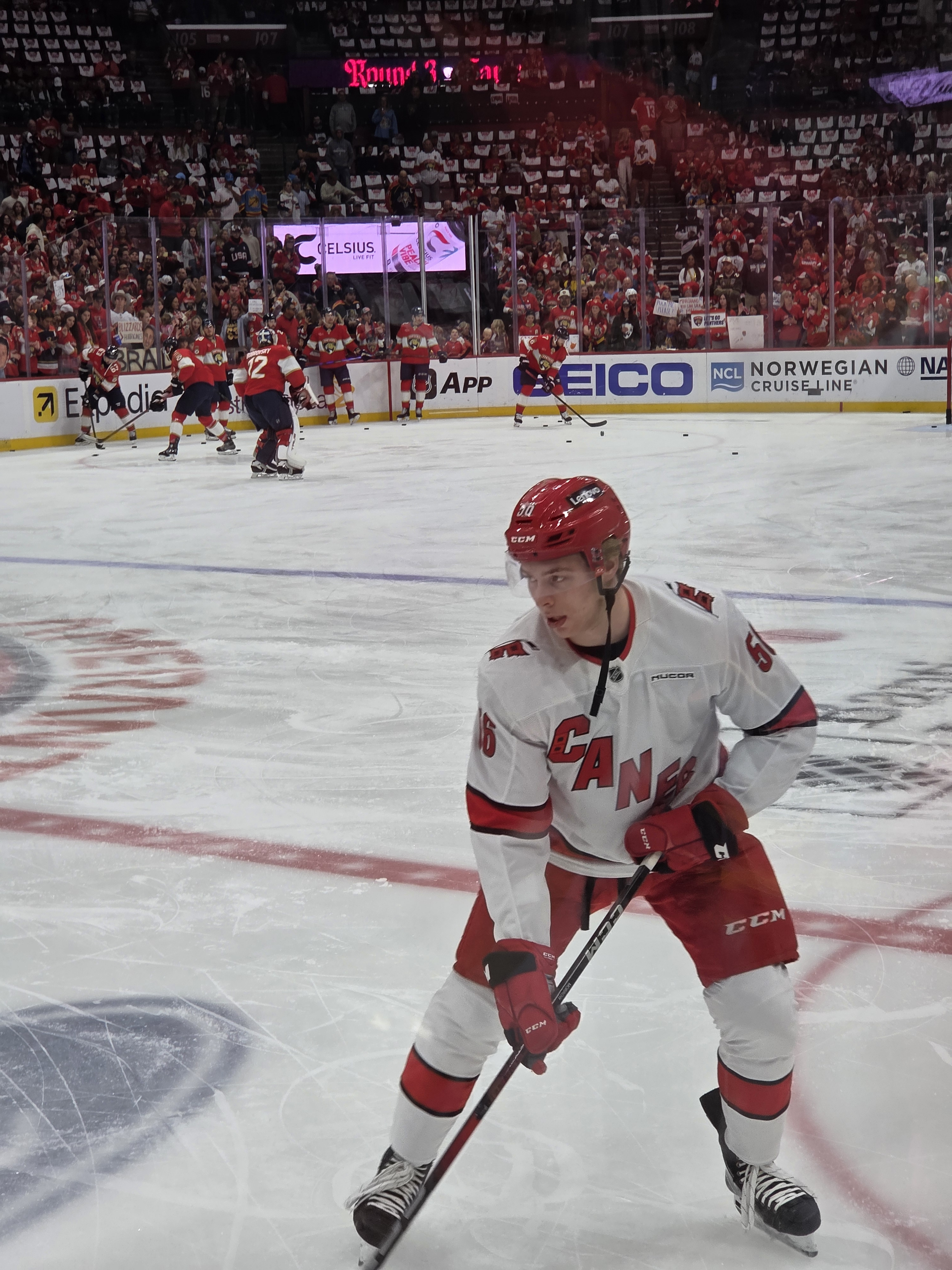
Scott Morrow

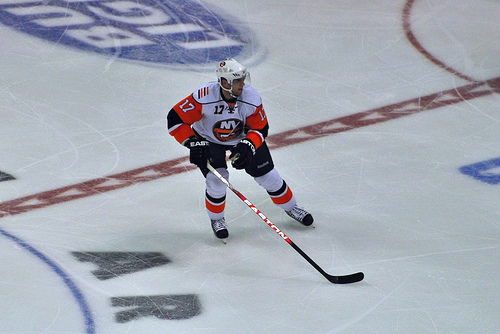
Thomas Pöck

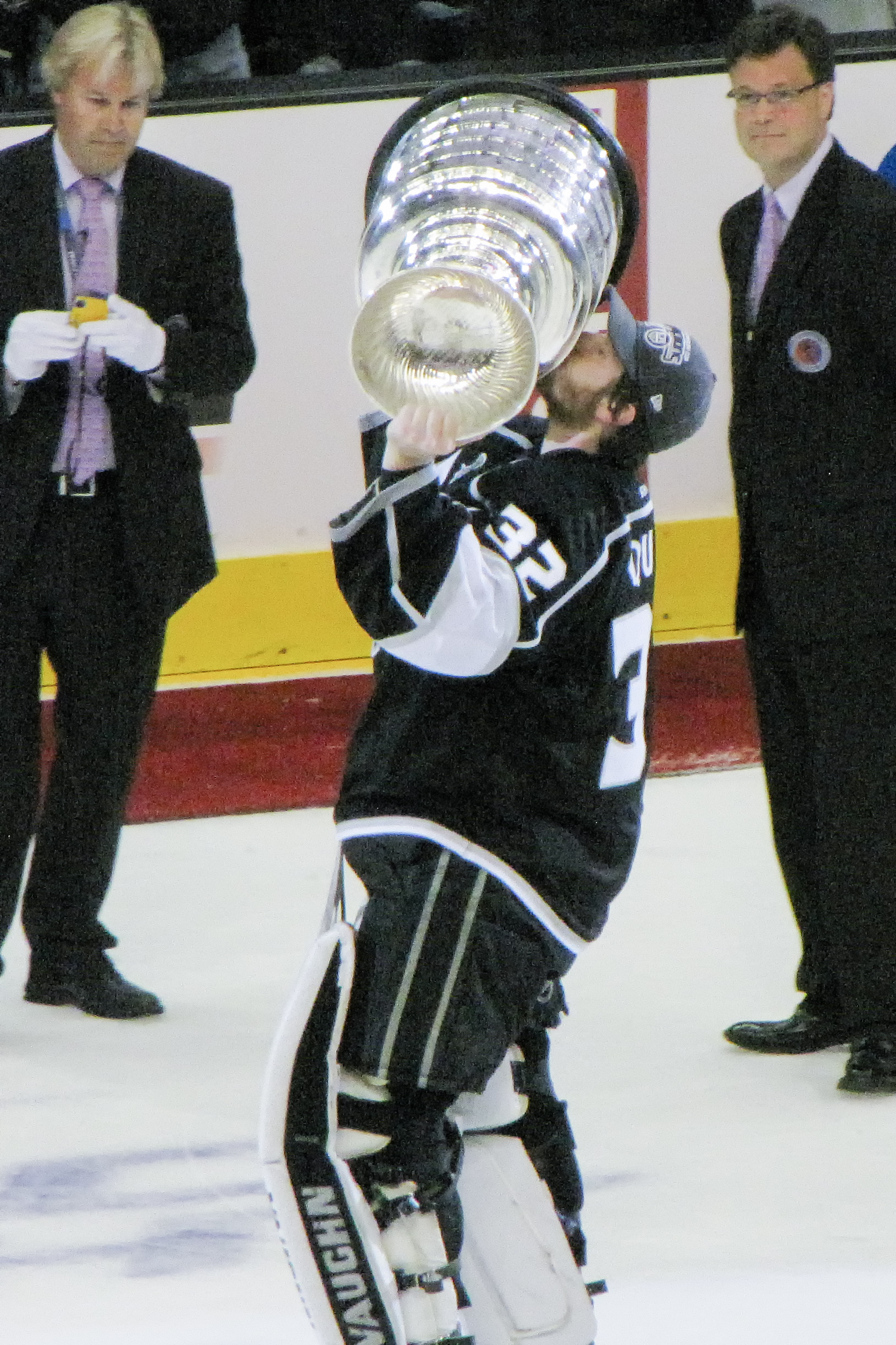
Jonathan Quick

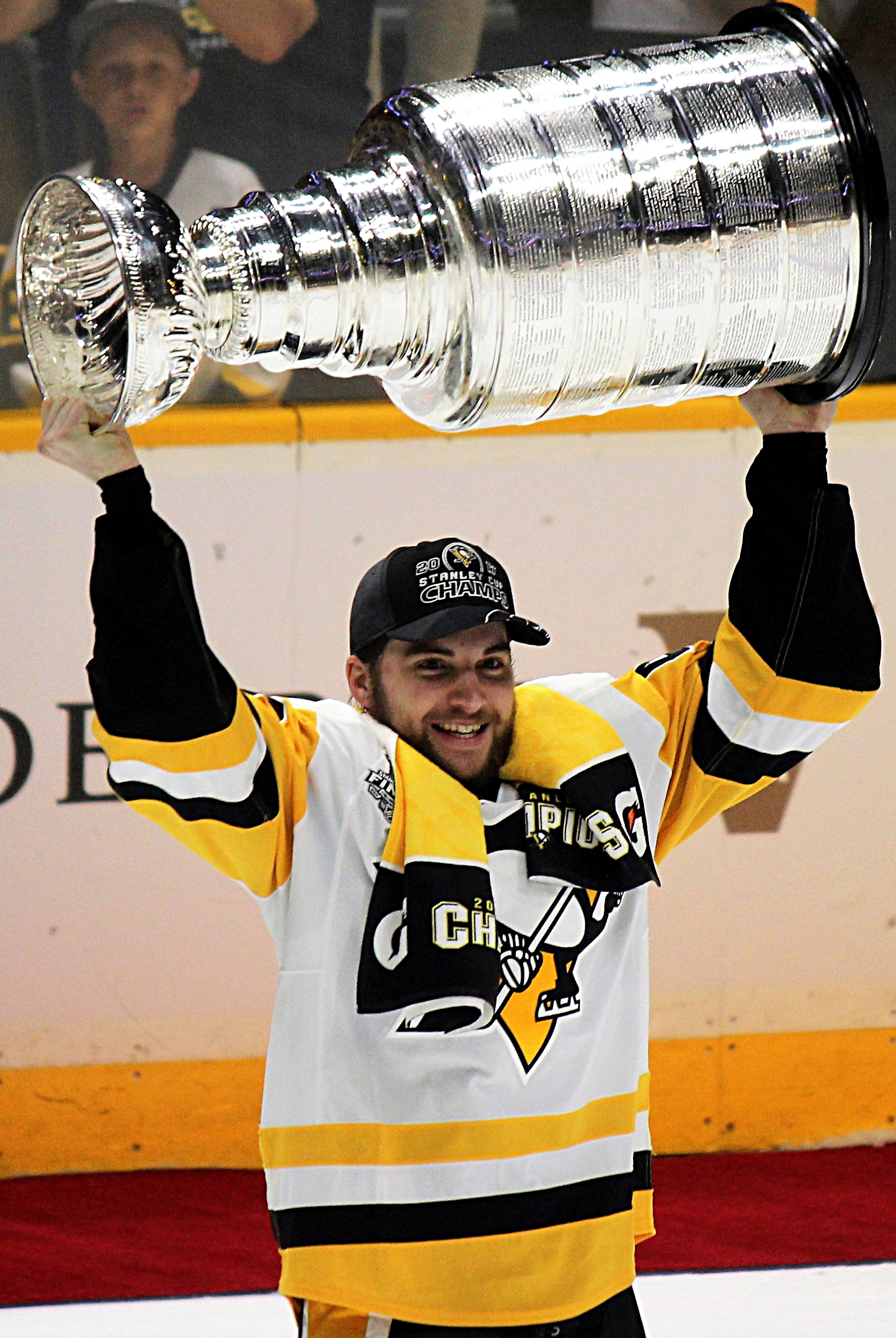
Conor Sheary

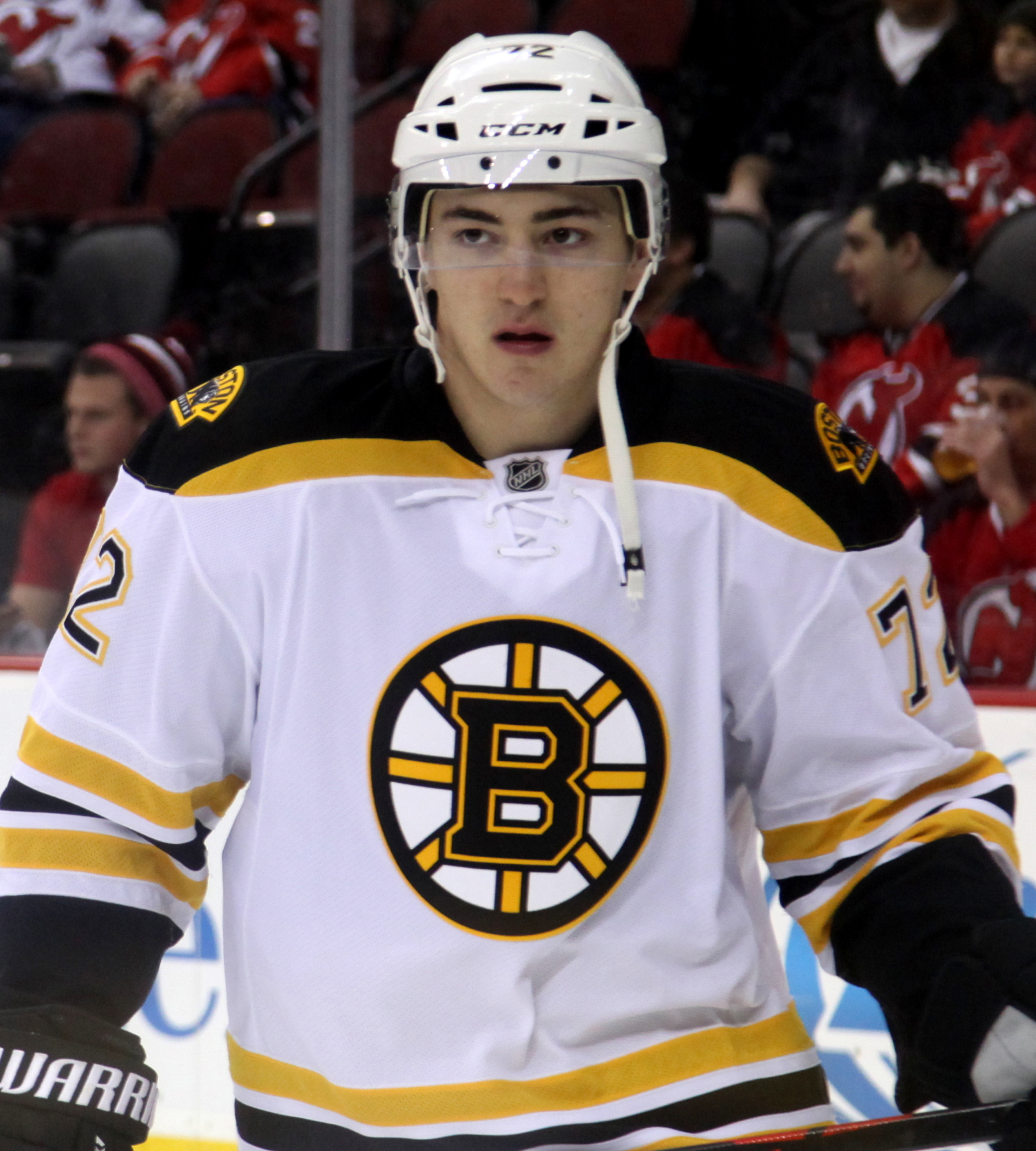
Frank Vatrano
