= 2020–21 Boston College Eagles men's ice hockey season =

NCAA Tournament, Regional final
- Conference: 1st Hockey East
- Home ice: Kelley Rink

Rankings
- USCHO.com: #6 (Final)
- USA Today/ US Hockey Magazine: #6 (Final)

Record
- Overall: 17–6–1
- Conference: 16–4–1
- Home: 10–3–1
- Road: 7–2–0
- Neutral: 0–1–0

Coaches and captains
- Head coach: Jerry York
- Assistant coaches: Mike Ayers; Brendan Buckley; Brooks Orpik
- Captain: Marc McLaughlin
- Alternate captain(s): Logan Hutsko; Michael Karow; Patrick Giles

The 2020–21 Boston College Eagles men's ice hockey team represented Boston College in the 2020–21 NCAA Division I men's ice hockey season. The team was coached by Jerry York, '67, his twenty-seventh season behind the bench at Boston College. The Eagles played their home games at Kelley Rink on the campus of Boston College, competing in Hockey East.

Due to the COVID-19 pandemic, no out-of-conference games were scheduled for the regular season, nor any traditional mid-season tournaments. As a result, the Eagles did not compete in any tournaments, including the annual Beanpot championship, which would have been in its 69th year of competition.

The Eagles finished the season 17–6–1, and 16–4–1 in conference play, good for 1st place in Hockey East, however, no regular season title was officially awarded due to disparate scheduling among the conference. They advanced to the semifinals of the Hockey East tournament where they lost 5–6 in double overtime to the UMass Lowell River Hawks. Boston College returned to the NCAA Tournament for the first time since 2016, as the top seed of the Northeast Regional hosted in Albany, New York. Their first round meeting with Notre Dame was ruled a no-contest as the Fighting Irish were forced to withdraw from the tournament due to COVID-19 protocols, and the Eagles advanced to the Regional final via forfeit. There, they were defeated by the St. Cloud State Huskies by a score of 1–4.

== Previous season recap ==
The Eagles entered the 2020–21 season following a strong 2019–20 effort. With a 24–8–2 record, going 17–6–1 in conference play, the Eagles finished first in Hockey East and captured their 20th regular season title; rebounding from a 7th-place finish in the previous year. However, that would be the only post-season trophy possible to earn, as both the Hockey East and NCAA tournaments were cancelled due to the COVID-19 pandemic before any games were played. The Eagles were a likely NCAA tournament qualifier which would have ended a three-year drought from the nationals. Additionally, they failed to secure any mid-season tournament title, their only tournament result being their third-place Beanpot finish.

== Departures ==
Thirteen Eagles departed from the program from the 2019–20 roster:

Graduation:

- Luke McInnis, Senior – D
- Ben Finkelstein, Senior – D
- Connor Moore, Senior – D
- Jesper Mattila, Senior – D
- Zach Walker, Senior – F
- David Cotton, Senior – F
- Mike Merulla, Senior – F
- Julius Mattila, Senior – F
- Graham McPhee, Senior – F
- Ron Greco, Senior – F
- Ryan Edquist, Senior – G

Signed Professionally:

- Aapeli Räsänen, Junior – F (Kalevan Pallo of the Finish Elite League)

Not Retained:

- Adin Farhat, Junior – G

Mid-Season Departures:

- Stephen Davies, Freshman – D (Halifax Mooseheads of the QMJHL, did not dress for any games and signed during the winter break)
- Logan Hutsko, Senior – F (Florida Panthers, signed after season-ending injury in February 2021)

== Recruiting ==
Boston College added eleven freshmen for the 2020–21 season: six forwards, four defensemen, and a goalie. Additionally, sophomore forward Liam Izyk transferred into the program from the Alabama–Huntsville Chargers.

Player	Position	Nationality	Notes
Stephen Davis	Defenseman	United States	Hingham, MA; Played for the Madison Capitols of the USHL.
Tim Lovell	Defenseman	United States	Hingham, MA; Played for the Des Moines Buccaneers of the USHL.
Eamon Powell	Defenseman	United States	Marcellus, NY; Drafted 116th overall by the Tampa Bay Lightning in the 2020 Draft, played for the USNTDP of the USHL.
Jack Agnew	Defenseman	Canada	Oakville, ON; Played for the Chilliwack Chiefs of the BCHL.
Nikita Nesterenko	Forward	United States	Brooklyn, NY; Drafted 172nd overall by the Minnesota Wild in the 2019 Draft, Played for the Chilliwack Chiefs of the BCHL.
Gentry Shamburger	Forward	United States	Atlanta, GA; Played for Avon Old Farms in the New England prep league, the Founders League.
Trevor Kuntar	Forward	United States	Buffalo, NY; Drafted 89th overall by the Boston Bruins in the 2020 Draft, played for the Youngstown Phantoms in the USHL.
Danny Weight	Forward	United States	Lattingtown, NY; Played for the Penticton Vees of the BCHL.
Harrison Roy	Forward	United States	Lakeville, MA; Played for the Des Moines Buccaneers of the USHL.
Colby Ambrosio	Forward	Canada	Welland, ON; Drafted 118th overall by the Colorado Avalanche in the 2020 Draft, Played for the Tri-City Storm of the USHL.
Liam Izyk	Forward	Canada	Blackie, AB; Sophomore transfer from the Alabama–Huntsville Chargers, playing in the WHCA.
Henry Wilder	Goalie	United States	Needham, MA; Played for the Hotchkiss School in the New England prep league, the Founders League.

Additionally, some mid-season roster additions occurred during the winter break:

- Junior defenseman Jack St. Ivany transferred from Yale and was immediately eligible to play.
- Senior goaltender Adin Farhat was officially recalled from the club team, as he not retained on the roster at the beginning of the season.

== 2020–2021 roster ==
=== 2020–21 Eagles ===
As of January 9, 2021.

No.	Nat.	Player	Class	Pos	Height	Weight	DoB	Hometown	Previous team	NHL rights
1	(United States)	Adin Farhat	Senior	G	5' 11" (1.8 m)	165 lb (75 kg)	1998-05-03	Hollis, New Hampshire	Loomis Chaffee School (USHS–NH)	—
2	(United States)	Michael Karow (A)	Senior	D	6' 2" (1.88 m)	209 lb (95 kg)	1998-12-18	Green Bay, Wisconsin	Youngstown Phantoms (USHL)	ARI, 126th overall 2017
3	(United States)	Jack St. Ivany	Junior	D	6' 3" (1.91 m)	200 lb (91 kg)	1999-07-22	Manhattan Beach, California	Yale (ECAC)	PHI, 112th overall 2018
4	(United States)	Drew Helleson	Sophomore	D	6' 2" (1.88 m)	191 lb (87 kg)	2001-03-26	Farmington, Minnesota	USNTDP (USHL)	COL, 47th overall 2019
5	(United States)	Marshall Warren	Sophomore	D	5' 11" (1.8 m)	163 lb (74 kg)	2001-04-20	Laurel Hollow, New York	USNTDP (USHL)	MIN, 166th overall 2019
6	(United States)	Tim Lovell	Freshman	D	5' 8" (1.73 m)	150 lb (68 kg)	2002-02-08	Hingham, Massachusetts	Des Moines (USHL)	—
7	(United States)	Eamon Powell	Freshman	D	5' 11" (1.8 m)	170 lb (77 kg)	2002-05-10	Marcellus, New York	USNTDP (USHL)	TBL, 116th overall 2020
8	(Canada)	Jack Agnew	Freshman	D	6' 0" (1.83 m)	200 lb (91 kg)	2001-10-22	Oakville, Ontario	Chilliwack Chiefs (BCHL)	—
9	(United States)	Logan Hutsko (A)	Senior	F	5' 11" (1.8 m)	175 lb (79 kg)	1999-02-11	Tampa, Florida	USNTDP (USHL)	FLA, 89th overall 2018
10	(United States)	Mitch Andres	Sophomore	D	6' 1" (1.85 m)	201 lb (91 kg)	1998-09-02	Brainerd, Minnesota	Chilliwack Chiefs (BCHL)	—
11	(Canada)	Jack McBain	Junior	F	6' 4" (1.93 m)	208 lb (94 kg)	2000-01-06	Toronto, Ontario	Toronto Jr. Canadiens (OJHL)	MIN, 63rd overall 2018
12	(United States)	Matt Boldy	Sophomore	F	6' 2" (1.88 m)	194 lb (88 kg)	2001-04-05	Millis, Massachusetts	USNTDP (USHL)	MIN, 12th overall 2019
13	(United States)	Nikita Nesterenko	Freshman	F	6' 2" (1.88 m)	180 lb (82 kg)	2001-09-10	Brooklyn, New York	Chilliwack Chiefs (BCHL)	MIN, 172nd overall 2019
14	(United States)	Gentry Shamburger	Freshman	F	6' 0" (1.83 m)	200 lb (91 kg)	2000-09-29	Atlanta, Georgia	Avon Old Farms (USHS–CT)	—
15	(United States)	Trevor Kuntar	Freshman	F	6' 0" (1.83 m)	200 lb (91 kg)	2001-06-20	Buffalo, New York	Youngstown Phantoms (USHL)	BOS, 89th overall 2020
17	(United States)	Danny Weight	Freshman	F	6' 0" (1.83 m)	175 lb (79 kg)	2001-05-01	Lattingtown, New York	Penticton Vees (BCHL)	—
18	(Canada)	Alex Newhook	Sophomore	F	5' 11" (1.8 m)	193 lb (88 kg)	2001-01-28	St. John's, Newfoundland	Victoria Grizzlies (BCHL)	COL, 16th overall 2019
19	(United States)	Mike Hardman	Sophomore	F	6' 2" (1.88 m)	204 lb (93 kg)	1999-02-05	Hanover, Massachusetts	West Kelowna Warriors (BCHL)	—
21	(Canada)	Liam Izyk	Sophomore	F	6' 1" (1.85 m)	190 lb (86 kg)	1998-12-27	Blackie, Alberta	Alabama Huntsville (WCHA)	—
22	(United States)	Casey Carreau	Junior	F	5' 9" (1.75 m)	185 lb (84 kg)	1998-03-08	Acushnet, Massachusetts	Boston Junior Bruins (NCDC)	—
24	(United States)	Patrick Giles (A)	Junior	F	6' 5" (1.96 m)	217 lb (98 kg)	2000-01-03	Chevy Chase, Maryland	USNTDP (USHL)	—
25	(United States)	Marc McLaughlin (C)	Junior	F	6' 0" (1.83 m)	210 lb (95 kg)	1999-07-26	North Billerica, Massachusetts	Cedar Rapids RoughRiders (USHL)	—
26	(United States)	Harrison Roy	Freshman	F	6' 1" (1.85 m)	190 lb (86 kg)	2000-01-17	Lakeville, Massachusetts	Des Moines Buccaneers (USHL)	—
27	(Canada)	Colby Ambrosio	Freshman	F	5' 9" (1.75 m)	170 lb (77 kg)	2002-08-07	Welland, Ontario	Tri-City Storm (USHL)	COL, 118th overall 2020
30	(United States)	Spencer Knight	Sophomore	G	6' 3" (1.91 m)	192 lb (87 kg)	2001-04-19	Darien, Connecticut	USNTDP (USHL)	FLA, 13th overall 2019
31	(United States)	Henry Wilder	Freshman	G	6' 1" (1.85 m)	183 lb (83 kg)	2001-03-19	Needham, Massachusetts	Hotchkiss School (USHS–CT)	—
32	(United States)	Jack Moffatt	Sophomore	G	6' 3" (1.91 m)	192 lb (87 kg)	2001-01-08	Wellesley, Massachusetts	Saint Sebastian's School (USHS–MA)	—

=== Coaching staff ===
Name	Position	Seasons at Boston College	Alma mater
Jerry York	Head Coach	27th	Boston College (1967)
Mike Ayers	Associate Head Coach	8th	University of New Hampshire (2004)
Brendan Buckley	Associate Head Coach	3rd	Boston College (1999)
Brooks Orpik	Assistant Coach	1st	Boston College (2001)

== Standings ==
2020–21 Hockey East Standings
	Conference record										Overall record					
	GP	W	L	T	OTW	OTL	SOW	HEPI	GF	GA	GP	W	L	T	GF	GA
#6 Boston College	21	16	4	1	3	2	0	58.61	82	46	24	17	6	1	91	58
#11 Boston University	14	10	3	1	3	1	1	56.36	49	37	16	10	5	1	52	45
#1 Massachusetts *	22	13	5	4	1	1	1	55.44	76	42	29	20	5	4	103	48
Connecticut	22	10	10	2	1	4	2	52.01	69	63	23	10	11	2	70	69
#16 Providence	23	10	8	5	0	0	2	50.80	63	61	25	11	9	5	71	67
Northeastern	20	9	8	3	1	0	3	49.94	68	60	21	9	9	3	69	64
#19 Massachusetts–Lowell	16	7	8	1	1	1	0	48.00	46	53	20	10	9	1	59	63
Maine	15	3	10	2	0	1	2	46.66	41	61	16	3	11	2	43	68
Merrimack	18	5	11	2	0	1	0	45.38	47	66	18	5	11	2	47	66
New Hampshire	21	5	13	3	3	2	2	43.66	51	83	23	6	14	3	60	88
Vermont	12	1	9	2	0	0	0	38.02	17	37	13	1	10	2	20	42
Championship: March 20, 2021; No Regular Season Champion Awarded * indicates conference tournament champion (Lamoriello Trophy); Rankings: USCHO.com Top 20 Poll

== Schedule ==
Date	Time	Opponent^{#}	Rank^{#}	Site	TV	Decision	Result	Attendance	Record
Regular season
November 27	6:00 pm	#7 Massachusetts	#2	Kelley Rink • Chestnut Hill, Massachusetts	NESN	Knight	W 4–3	0	1–0–0 (1–0–0)
November 28	4:30 pm	at #7 Massachusetts	#2	Mullins Center • Amherst, Massachusetts	NESN+	Knight	W 6–3	0	2–0–0 (2–0–0)
December 4	6:00 pm	#12 Providence	#2	Kelley Rink • Chestnut Hill, Massachusetts	NESN	Knight	W 3–0	0	3–0–0 (3–0–0)
December 5	7:00 pm	at #12 Providence	#2	Schneider Arena • Providence, Rhode Island	NESN	Knight	W 9–0	0	4–0–0 (4–0–0)
December 11	6:00 pm	Connecticut	#2	Kelley Rink • Chestnut Hill, Massachusetts	NESN	Wilder	W 4–3 ^{OT}	0	5–0–0 (5–0–0)
December 12	3:30 pm	at Connecticut	#2	Freitas Ice Forum • Storrs, Connecticut		Wilder	L 1–3	0	5–1–0 (5–1–0)
January 8	7:00 pm	New Hampshire	#2	Kelley Rink • Chestnut Hill, Massachusetts	NESN	Wilder	L 3–4 ^{OT}	0	5–2–0 (5–2–0)
January 10	4:00 pm	at New Hampshire	#2	Whittemore Center • Durham, New Hampshire		Knight	W 3–2 ^{OT}	0	6–2–0 (6–2–0)
January 16	7:00 pm	Merrimack	#3	Kelley Rink • Chestnut Hill, Massachusetts	NESN	Knight	W 2–1	0	7–2–0 (7–2–0)
January 17	4:00 pm	at Merrimack	#3	Lawler Rink • North Andover, Massachusetts		Knight	W 5–3	0	8–2–0 (8–2–0)
January 22	4:00 pm	Connecticut	#1	Kelley Rink • Chestnut Hill, Massachusetts		Knight	T 3–3 ^{SOL}	0	8–2–1 (8–2–1)
January 23	4:00 pm	at Connecticut	#1	Freitas Ice Forum • Storrs, Connecticut		Knight	W 4–2	0	9–2–1 (9–2–1)
February 2	7:00 pm	at #14 Northeastern	#1	Matthews Arena • Boston, Massachusetts	NESN+	Knight	W 6–2	0	10–2–1 (10–2–1)
February 5	7:00 pm	#15 Boston University	#1	Kelley Rink • Chestnut Hill, Massachusetts (Green Line Rivalry)	NESN+	Knight	W 4–3 ^{OT}	0	11–2–1 (11–2–1)
February 6	7:00 pm	at #15 Boston University	#1	Walter Brown Arena • Boston, Massachusetts (Green Line Rivalry)		Knight	L 1–3	0	11–3–1 (11–3–1)
February 12	7:00 pm	UMass Lowell	#1	Kelley Rink • Chestnut Hill, Massachusetts	NESN+	Knight	W 7–1	0	12–3–1 (12–3–1)
February 13	6:00 pm	at UMass Lowell	#1	Tsongas Center • Lowell, Massachusetts		Knight	W 4–3	0	13–3–1 (13–3–1)
February 19	7:00 pm	Maine	#1	Kelley Rink • Chestnut Hill, Massachusetts	NESN+	Knight	W 4–2	0	14–3–1 (14–3–1)
February 20	5:00 pm	Maine	#1	Kelley Rink • Chestnut Hill, Massachusetts	NESN	Knight	W 3–0	0	15–3–1 (15–3–1)
February 26	7:00 pm	#9 Massachusetts	#1	Kelley Rink • Chestnut Hill, Massachusetts	NESN+	Knight	L 2–3 ^{OT}	0	15–4–1 (15–4–1)
March 5	5:00 pm	#18 Northeastern	#2	Kelley Rink • Chestnut Hill, Massachusetts		Knight	W 4–2	0	16–4–1 (16–4–1)
Hockey East Tournament
March 14	4:30 pm	New Hampshire*	#1	Kelley Rink • Chestnut Hill, Massachusetts (Quarterfinals)	NESN	Knight	W 3–2	0	17–4–1 (16–4–1)
March 17	4:30 pm	UMass Lowell*	#1	Kelley Rink • Chestnut Hill, Massachusetts (Semifinals)	NESN	Knight	L 5–6 ^{2OT}	0	17–5–1 (16–4–1)
NCAA Tournament
March 27	1:00pm	vs. #18 Notre Dame*	#2	Times Union Center • Albany, New York (Regional semifinal, Holy War on Ice)	ESPNews		No Contest ^{†}		
March 28	5:30pm	vs. #7 St. Cloud State*	#2	Times Union Center • Albany, New York (Regional final)	ESPN2	Knight	L 1–4	1,136	17–6–1 (16–4–1)
*Non-conference game. ^{#}Rankings from USCHO.com Poll. All times are in Eastern Time. Attendance data from Hockey East. ^{OT}Denotes game ended in the overtime period. ^{SOW} or ^{SOL}Denotes game resulted in an official tie with a shootout win/loss.

† Notre Dame was forced to withdraw from the regional semifinal match on March 27, as the team received multiple positive COVID tests on March 25. The game was ruled a no-contest and the Eagles automatically advanced to the regional final.

== Rankings ==
Poll	Week																					
Poll	Pre	1	2	3	4	5	6	7	8	9	10	11	12	13	14	15	16	17	18	19	20	Final
USCHO.com	2	2	2	2	2	2	2	2	2	3	1	1	1	1	1	1	2	1	1	2	—	6
USA Today	2	2	2	2	2	2	2	2	2	3	1	1	1	2	2	2	2	1	1	3	7	6

== Statistics ==
=== Skaters ===
No.	Player	POS	YR	GP	G	A	Pts	PIM	PP	SHG	GWG	+/-	SOG
1	Adin Farhat	G	SR	0	0	0	0	0	0	0	0	E	0
2	Michael Karow	D	SR	24	1	2	3	18	0	0	0	+10	33
3	Jack St. Ivany	D	JR	18	1	5	6	6	0	0	0	–1	34
4	Drew Helleson	D	SO	22	4	11	15	8	1	0	1	+23	50
5	Marshall Warren	D	SO	23	3	8	11	27	0	0	1	+13	47
6	Tim Lovell	D	FR	18	0	2	2	6	0	0	0	+3	0
7	Eamon Powell	D	FR	24	2	12	14	6	1	0	0	+12	25
8	Jack Agnew	D	FR	6	0	0	0	0	0	0	0	–1	1
9	Logan Hutsko	F	SR	11	4	7	11	10	0	0	0	+11	37
10	Mitch Andres	D	SO	24	0	1	1	9	0	0	0	+2	10
11	Jack McBain	F	JR	24	6	13	19	12	0	0	1	+14	60
12	Matt Boldy	F	SO	22	11	20	31	4	2	3	2	+15	71
13	Nikita Nesterenko	F	FR	24	8	11	19	18	0	1	1	+12	49
14	Gentry Shamburger	F	FR	12	0	0	0	4	0	0	0	–1	0
15	Trevor Kuntar	F	FR	23	6	4	10	33	1	0	1	+2	53
17	Danny Weight	F	FR	19	1	1	2	0	0	0	1	–1	14
18	Alex Newhook	F	SO	12	7	9	16	8	4	0	1	–1	48
19	Mike Hardman	F	SO	24	10	9	19	14	1	0	1	+5	59
21	Liam Izyk	F	SO	4	0	0	0	0	0	0	0	–1	2
22	Casey Carreau	D	JR	23	5	3	8	0	0	0	1	+2	39
24	Patrick Giles	F	JR	24	3	9	12	16	0	0	1	+8	41
25	Marc McLaughlin	F	JR	24	10	14	24	6	2	3	5	+16	49
26	Harrison Roy	F	FR	23	2	1	3	19	0	0	0	–2	24
27	Colby Ambrosio	F	FR	24	7	8	15	6	1	1	0	+9	62
30	Spencer Knight	G	SO	21	0	1	1	2	0	0	0	+36	0
31	Henry Wilder	G	FR	3	0	1	1	0	0	0	0	–2	0
32	Jack Moffatt	G	SO	0	0	0	0	0	0	0	0	E	0
	Bench							8					
	Team			24	91	152	243	242	13	8	17	+33	808

=== Goaltenders ===
No.	Player	YR	GS	GP	MIN	W	L	T	GA	GAA	SA	SV	SV%	SO
1	Adin Farhat	SR	0	0	0:00	0	0	0	0	0.00	0	0	1.00	0
30	Spencer Knight	SO	21	21	1296:27	16	4	1	47	2.18	691	644	0.932	3
31	Henry Wilder	FR	3	3	187:43	1	2	0	10	3.20	110	100	0.909	0
32	Jack Moffatt	SO	0	0	0:00	0	0	0	0	0.00	0	0	1.00	0
	Empty Net			8	8:01				1		1			
	Team		24	24	1492:11	17	6	1	58	2.33	802	744	0.928	3

== Awards and honors ==
Hobey Baker Award

- Spencer Knight, G – Top 10 Finalist
- Matt Boldy, F – Top 10 Finalist

Mike Richter Award

- Spencer Knight, G – Top 3 Finalist

CCM/AHCA All-Americans

- Spencer Knight, G – First Team East
- Matt Boldy, F – First Team East
- Drew Helleson, D – Second Team East

Hockey East Awards

- Spencer Knight, G – Goaltender of the Year, Player of the Year
- Marc McLaughlin, F – Best Defensive Forward, Three Stars Award (Shared with Jonny Evans, Connecticut and Aidan McDonough, Northeastern)
- Drew Helleson, D – Best Defensive Defenseman
- Nikita Nesterenko, F – Co-Rookie of the Year (Shared with Josh Lopina, Massachusetts)
- Jerry York, Coach – Coach of the Year

Hockey East All-Stars

- Spencer Knight, G – First Team
- Matt Boldy, F – First Team
- Drew Helleson, D – First Team
- Marc McLaughlin, F – Third Team
- Eamon Powell, D – All-Rookie Team
- Nikita Nesterenko, F – All-Rookie Team

Hockey East Goaltender of the Month

- Spencer Knight, G – Month of December

Hockey East Player of the Week

- Matt Boldy, F
  Week of November 30, 2020
  Week of December 7, 2020
  Week of February 15, 2021 (Shared with Aidan McDonough, Northeastern)
  Week of March 8, 2021 (Shared with Jáchym Kondelík, Connecticut)
- Spencer Knight, G – Week of December 7, 2020
- Marc McLaughlin, F – Week of February 22, 2021

Hockey East Defensive Player of the Week

- Drew Helleson, D – Week of November 30, 2020

Hockey East Rookie of the Week

- Colby Ambrosio, F – Week of November 30, 2020
- Nikita Nesterenko, F – Week of January 18, 2021, Week of March 15, 2021
- Henry Wilder, G – Week of December 14, 2020

== Players drafted into the NHL ==
=== 2021 NHL entry draft ===
Round	Pick	Player	NHL team
3	94	Aidan Hreschuk^{†}	Carolina Hurricanes
7	213	Andre Gasseau^{†}	Boston Bruins

† incoming freshman
