= 2020–21 Hockey East men's season =

- Season: 2020–21
- Conference: Hockey East
- Division: Division I
- Sport: men's ice hockey
- Duration: November 20, 2020– April 10, 2021
- Number of teams: 11

2021 NHL Entry Draft
- Top draft pick: Josh Lopina
- Picked by: Anaheim Ducks

Regular Season
- Season champions: None
- Season MVP: Spencer Knight
- Top scorer: Jonny Evans

Hockey East tournament
- Tournament champions: Massachusetts
- Runners-up: Massachusetts–Lowell
- Tournament MVP: Bobby Trivigno
- Top scorer: Alex Newhook; Bobby Trivigno

NCAA tournament
- Bids: 3
- Record: 4–2
- Best Finish: National Champion
- Team(s): Massachusetts

The 2020–21 Hockey East men's season was the 37th season of play for Hockey East and took place during the 2020–21 NCAA Division I men's ice hockey season. The start of the regular season was delayed until on November 20, 2020 and conclude on April 10, 2021. Massachusetts won its first national championship.

== Season ==
Due to the ongoing COVID-19 pandemic, Hockey East was forced to delay the start to its season until mid-November. Even when team's began to play games, several programs were adversely affected by the virus. Boston University was particularly hard-hit by COVID and couldn't play their first game until January. Due to the strange nature of the season, Hockey East decided to use a Power Index to determine the conference standings. Additionally, all eleven members schools would be included in the conference tournament rather that the normal 8-team format.

Throughout the season, Boston College led in the standings and was in the top 3 for the national rankings. Behind the Eagles, the conference had at least 4 other teams with a national ranking. While it appeared that Hockey East could get as many as 6 bids into the tournament, several programs faded as the year progressed and only three conference teams ended up making the NCAA tournament.

Boston University, who had played well in their small number of games, fell to St. Cloud State in their opening match. BC was advanced to the second round after a COVID withdrawal and opened with a match against the same team. The result was much the same as St. Cloud overcame an early BC lead to take the game by a comfortable margin. In the Eastern region, meanwhile, Hockey East champion Massachusetts ran roughshod over their opponents. The Minutemen blew the door off of Lake Superior State in the first round and then dominated Bemidji State in the quarterfinals, surrendering just 1 goal in 120 minutes.

Entering the Frozen Four, UMass received awful news when several members were placed in COVID protocols due to contact tracing. Even worse was that their starting goaltender, Filip Lindberg, was one of the players and would be forced to miss the rematch with defending national champion Minnesota Duluth. Massachusetts was able to keep the game close despite missing key players and managed to push the game into overtime. backup netminder Matt Murray played a masterful game, keeping UMD from scoring in the final 29 minutes of regulation and an additional 14 minutes of overtime. His stellar play enabled Garret Wait to score the winning goal for UMass and sent the team to their second straight championship match.

Prior to the final game, Lindberg ended up testing negative and drove overnight from Amherst to Pittsburgh so he could play in the title tilt. Lindberg turned in a solid performance but the entire team was responsible for Massachusetts' shutting down St. Cloud State. UMass took the game 5–0, the largest margin of victory in 11 years, and took home the program's first national championship. The win was the first for the conference since 2015 and ended the reign of the NCHC, who had possessed the crown ever since.

== Standings ==
2020–21 Hockey East Standings
	Conference record										Overall record					
	GP	W	L	T	OTW	OTL	SOW	HEPI	GF	GA	GP	W	L	T	GF	GA
#6 Boston College	21	16	4	1	3	2	0	58.61	82	46	24	17	6	1	91	58
#11 Boston University	14	10	3	1	3	1	1	56.36	49	37	16	10	5	1	52	45
#1 Massachusetts *	22	13	5	4	1	1	1	55.44	76	42	29	20	5	4	103	48
Connecticut	22	10	10	2	1	4	2	52.01	69	63	23	10	11	2	70	69
#16 Providence	23	10	8	5	0	0	2	50.80	63	61	25	11	9	5	71	67
Northeastern	20	9	8	3	1	0	3	49.94	68	60	21	9	9	3	69	64
#19 Massachusetts–Lowell	16	7	8	1	1	1	0	48.00	46	53	20	10	9	1	59	63
Maine	15	3	10	2	0	1	2	46.66	41	61	16	3	11	2	43	68
Merrimack	18	5	11	2	0	1	0	45.38	47	66	18	5	11	2	47	66
New Hampshire	21	5	13	3	3	2	2	43.66	51	83	23	6	14	3	60	88
Vermont	12	1	9	2	0	0	0	38.02	17	37	13	1	10	2	20	42
Championship: March 20, 2021; No Regular Season Champion Awarded * indicates conference tournament champion (Lamoriello Trophy); Rankings: USCHO.com Top 20 Poll

== Coaches ==
Todd Woodcroft was hired as the 5th head coach for Vermont after the resignation of Kevin Sneddon.

=== Records ===
Team	Head coach	Season at school	Record at school	Hockey East record
Boston College	Jerry York	27	624–323–80	363–193–69
Boston University	Albie O'Connell	3	29–31–12	22–18–8
Connecticut	Mike Cavanaugh	8	93–124–31	36–51–14
Maine	Red Gendron	8	100–126–31	62–87–20
Massachusetts	Greg Carvel	5	74–70–6	43–46–5
Massachusetts–Lowell	Norm Bazin	10	205–110–32	116–71–27
Merrimack	Scott Borek	3	16–46–6	11–32–6
New Hampshire	Michael Souza	3	27–30–13	17–22–9
Northeastern	Jim Madigan	10	165–130–36	104–99–26
Providence	Nate Leaman	10	192–113–44	112–72–28
Vermont	Todd Woodcroft	1	0–0–0	0–0–0

== Statistics ==
=== Leading scorers ===
GP = Games played; G = Goals; A = Assists; Pts = Points

Player	Class	Team	GP	G	A	Pts
Jonny Evans	Junior	Connecticut	22	14	14	28
Matthew Boldy	Sophomore	Boston College	19	10	14	24
Zach Solow	Senior	Northeastern	20	11	13	24
Bobby Trivigno	Junior	Massachusetts	22	8	16	24
Marc McLaughlin	Junior	Boston College	21	9	14	23
Jackson Pierson	Junior	New Hampshire	21	8	15	23
Tyce Thompson	Junior	Providence	23	10	12	22
Jáchym Kondelík	Junior	Connecticut	22	3	18	21
Aidan McDonough	Sophomore	Northeastern	20	10	10	20
Oliver Chau	Senior	Massachusetts	22	4	16	20

=== Leading goaltenders ===
Minimum 1/3 of team's minutes played in conference games.
GP = Games played; Min = Minutes played; W = Wins; L = Losses; T = Ties; GA = Goals against; SO = Shutouts; SV% = Save percentage; GAA = Goals against average

Player	Class	Team	GP	Min	W	L	T	GA	SO	SV%	GAA
Filip Lindberg	Junior	Massachusetts	9	558:43	4	1	4	15	2	.937	1.61
Spencer Knight	Sophomore	Boston College	18	1087:35	15	2	1	36	3	.937	1.99
Matt Murray	Senior	Massachusetts	13	776:27	9	4	0	26	3	.913	2.01
Jaxson Stauber	Sophomore	Providence	21	1274:46	10	6	5	47	4	.915	2.21
Connor Murphy	Sophomore	Northeastern	20	1195:41	9	8	3	53	2	.912	2.66

== Conference tournament ==
Teams are reseeded after the Opening Round and Quarterfinals

Opening Round; March 10
7	Massachusetts–Lowell	5
10	Vermont	3
8	Maine	2
9	New Hampshire	7

Quarterfinals; March 14
1	Boston College	3
9	New Hampshire	2
2	Boston University	1
7	Massachusetts–Lowell	2
3	Massachusetts	4
6	Northeastern	1
4	Connecticut	1
5	Providence	6

Semifinals; March 17
1	Boston College	5
7	Massachusetts–Lowell	6**
3	Massachusetts	5
5	Providence	2

Championship; March 20
7	Massachusetts–Lowell	0
3	Massachusetts	1

Note: * denotes overtime period(s)

== NCAA tournament ==
=== Northeast Region ===
==== Regional semifinal ====
After seeding, Notre Dame, Boston College's opponent in the first round, was forced to withdraw due to COVID-19 positive tests. BC was automatically advanced to the second round by a no-contest decision.

March 27, 2021; 1:00 PM	(2) St. Cloud State	6 – 2 (0–0, 3–2, 3–0)	(3) Boston University	Times Union Center, Albany, New York; Attendance: 1,136

Game reference

Dávid Hrenák
Goalies
Drew Commesso
Referees:
Colin Kronfrost
Brett DesRosiers
Linesmen:
Sam Shikowsky
Nick Bradshaw

	0–1	20:08 – Wilmer Skoog (4) (Cockerill)
(Walker, Trejbal) Micah Miller (2) – 32:14	1–1
(Hammer, Kupka) Nick Perbix (7) – 33:29	2–1
	2–2	35:28 – PP – Jake Wise (9) (Tuch)
(Walker) Easton Brodzinski (12) – GW – 36:00	3–2
(unassisted) Jami Krannila (11) – SH PS – 44:17	4–2
(Walker) Easton Brodzinski (13) – 50:04	5–2
(Bushy, Krannila) Veeti Miettinen (11) – 55:02	6–2

23 min
Penalties
21 min
38
Shots
36

==== Regional final ====
March 28, 2021; 5:30	(1) Boston College	1 – 4 (1–0, 0–3, 0–1)	(2) St. Cloud State	Times Union Center, Albany, New York; Attendance: 1,136

Game reference

Spencer Knight
Goalies
Dávid Hrenák
Referees:
Ryan Sweeney
Mike Schubert
Linesmen:
Joe Sherman
Anthony Valley

(Newhook, Hardman) Matt Boldy (11) – 14:23	1–0
	1–1	29:21 – Luke Jaycox (1) (Okabe, Krannila)
	1–2	35:15 – GW – Will Hammer (2) (Perbix, Cockrell)
	1–3	39:15 – Nolan Walker (9) (Perbix)
	1–4	59:15 – EN – Micah Miller (3) (Bushy)

2 min
Penalties
4 min
27
Shots
36

=== East Region ===
==== Regional semifinals ====
March 26, 2021; 6:30 PM	(2) Massachusetts	5 – 1 (1–1, 2–0, 2–0)	(3) Lake Superior State	Webster Bank Arena, Bridgeport, Connecticut; Attendance: 100

Game reference

Filip Lindberg
Goalies
Mareks Mitens
Referees:
Dan Dreger
Joseph Sullivan
Linesmen:
Tony Anderson
Dana Penkivech

(Harding, Jones) Jake Gaudet (4) – 10:07	1–0
	1–1	17:14 – Ashton Calder (16) (Veillette, Nordqvist)
(Trivigno) Josh Lopina (9) – GW – 31:03	2–1
(Farmer, Chau) Carson Gicewicz (14) – 33:00	3–1
(Chau, Jones) Jake Gaudet (5) – 50:49	4–1
(Jones) Anthony Del Gaizo (1) – 55:47	5–1

12 min
Penalties
8 min
37
Shots
31

==== Regional final ====
March 27, 2021; 4:00 PM	(2) Massachusetts	4 – 0 (2–0, 1–0, 1–0)	(4) Bemidji State	Webster Bank Arena, Bridgeport, Connecticut; Attendance: 0

Game reference

Filip Lindberg
Goalies
Zach Driscoll
Referees:
Nick Krebsbach
Ryan Hersey
Linesmen:
Tyler Liffrig
Justin Hills

(Chau, Bohlinger) Carson Gicewicz (15) – SH GW – 14:24	1–0
(Kessel) Carson Gicewicz (16) – 19:08	2–0
(Gaudet, M. Del Gaizo) Carson Gicewicz (17) – 26:34	3–0
(M. Del Gaizo) Oliver Chau (5) – EN – 56:56	4–0

23 min
Penalties
6 min
28
Shots
18

=== Frozen Four ===
==== National semifinal ====
April 8, 2021; 9:00 PM	(E2) Massachusetts	3 – 2 (OT) (1–1, 0–1, 1–0, 1–0)	(MW3) Minnesota Duluth	PPG Paints Arena, Pittsburgh, Pennsylvania; Attendance: 3,660

Game reference

Matt Murray
Goalies
Zach Stejskal
Referees:
Brett DesRosiers
Brett Sheva
Linesmen:
Justin Cornell
Pat Richardson

(Kessel, Chau) Zac Jones (9) – PP – 15:33	1–0
	1–1	17:50 – Tanner Laderoute (3) (Olson, Kelley)
	1–2	31:01 – Cole Koepke (15) (Cates, Swaney)
(Lopina, Trivigno) Anthony Del Gaizo (2) – 48:25	2–2
(Trivigno, Lopina) Garrett Wait (9) – GW – 74:30	3–2

2 min
Penalties
4 min
28
Shots
38

==== National Championship ====
April 10, 2021; 7:00 PM	(E2) Massachusetts	5 – 0	(NE2) St. Cloud State	PPG Paints Arena, Pittsburgh, Pennsylvania; Attendance: 3,963

Game reference

Scoring summary
Period	Team	Goal	Assist(s)	Time	Score
1st	UMA	Aaron Bohlinger (1) – GW	Sullivan and Farmer	7:26	1–0 UMA
1st	UMA	Reed Lebster (2)	Kiefiuk	18:56	2–0 UMA
2nd	UMA	Philip Lagunov (6) – SH	unassisted	25:10	3–0 UMA
2nd	UMA	Matthew Kessel (10) – PP	Chau and Gaudet	33:45	4–0 UMA
3rd	UMA	Bobby Trivigno (11)	Lebster	46:00	5–0 UMA
Penalty summary
Period	Team	Player	Penalty	Time	PIM
1st	UMA	Anthony Del Gaizo	Slashing	15:27	2:00
2nd	STC	Seamus Donohue	Tripping	20:24	2:00
2nd	UMA	Ryan Sullivan	Tripping	23:57	2:00
2nd	UMA	Jake Gaudet	Elbowing	30:31	2:00
2nd	STC	Bench (served by Zach Okabe)	Too Many Men	32:35	2:00
3rd	None				

Shots by period
Team	1	2	3	T
St. Cloud State	3	12	10	25
Massachusetts	7	6	9	22

Goaltenders
Team	Name	Saves	Goals against	Time on ice
STC	Dávid Hrenák	17	5	60:00
UMA	Filip Lindberg	25	0	60:00

== Ranking ==
=== USCHO ===
Team	Pre	1	2	3	4	5	6	7	8	9	10	11	12	13	14	15	16	17	18	19	20	Final
Boston College	2	2	2	2	2	2	2	2	2	3	1	1	1	1	1	1	2	1	1	2	N/A	6
Boston University	NR	20	20	NR	NR	NR	NR	NR	NR	NR	NR	15	15	13	11	8	10	9	11	10	N/A	11
Connecticut	NR	NR	NR	NR	NR	NR	NR	NR	NR	NR	NR	NR	NR	20	NR	NR	NR	NR	NR	NR	N/A	NR
Maine	NR	NR	NR	NR	NR	NR	NR	NR	NR	NR	NR	NR	NR	NR	NR	NR	NR	NR	NR	NR	N/A	NR
Massachusetts	7	7	7	8	10	10	10	9	8	6	9	10	10	9	10	9	6	7	6	6	N/A	1
Massachusetts–Lowell	11	12	11	10	8	15	17	15	15	15	16	20	NR	NR	NR	NR	NR	NR	NR	19	N/A	19
Merrimack	NR	NR	NR	NR	NR	NR	NR	NR	NR	NR	NR	NR	NR	NR	NR	NR	NR	NR	NR	NR	N/A	NR
New Hampshire	NR	NR	NR	NR	NR	NR	NR	NR	NR	NR	NR	NR	NR	NR	NR	NR	NR	NR	NR	NR	N/A	NR
Northeastern	19	18	16	15	17	12	12	13	14	14	13	14	14	18	16	17	18	20	NR	NR	N/A	NR
Providence	17	15	13	12	19	19	15	15	16	16	18	17	16	16	15	14	15	17	14	16	N/A	16
Vermont	NR	NR	NR	NR	NR	NR	NR	NR	NR	NR	NR	NR	NR	NR	NR	NR	NR	NR	NR	NR	N/A	NR

=== USA Today ===
Team	Pre	1	2	3	4	5	6	7	8	9	10	11	12	13	14	15	16	17	18	19	20	Final
Boston College	2	2	2	2	2	2	2	2	2	3	1	1	1	2	2	2	2	1	1	3	7	6
Boston University	NR	NR	NR	NR	NR	NR	NR	NR	NR	NR	NR	15	15	13	12	8	11	10	11	11	12	12
Connecticut	NR	NR	NR	NR	NR	NR	NR	NR	NR	NR	NR	NR	NR	15	NR	NR	NR	NR	NR	NR	NR	NR
Maine	NR	NR	NR	NR	NR	NR	NR	NR	NR	NR	NR	NR	NR	NR	NR	NR	NR	NR	NR	NR	NR	NR
Massachusetts	7	7	8	9	12	13	10	9	8	6	8	10	9	9	9	9	6	8	7	5	2	1
Massachusetts–Lowell	11	12	12	10	9	15	NR	NR	13	15	NR	NR	NR	NR	NR	NR	NR	NR	NR	NR	NR	NR
Merrimack	NR	NR	NR	NR	NR	NR	NR	NR	NR	NR	NR	NR	NR	NR	NR	NR	NR	NR	NR	NR	NR	NR
New Hampshire	NR	NR	NR	NR	NR	NR	NR	NR	NR	NR	NR	NR	NR	NR	NR	NR	NR	NR	NR	NR	NR	NR
Northeastern	NR	NR	NR	15	14	10	11	10	15	13	13	12	14	NR	NR	NR	NR	NR	NR	NR	NR	NR
Providence	NR	15	13	12	NR	NR	13	NR	NR	NR	NR	NR	NR	NR	NR	NR	NR	NR	14	NR	NR	NR
Vermont	NR	NR	NR	NR	NR	NR	NR	NR	NR	NR	NR	NR	NR	NR	NR	NR	NR	NR	NR	NR	NR	NR

== Awards ==
=== NCAA ===
AHCA All-American Teams
East First Team	Pos	Team
Spencer Knight	G	Boston College
David Farrance	D	Boston University
Matthew Boldy	F	Boston College
Bobby Trivigno	F	Massachusetts
East Second Team	Pos	Team
Drew Helleson	D	Boston College
Zac Jones	D	Massachusetts
Jonny Evans	F	Connecticut

=== Hockey East ===
Award		Recipient
Player of the Year		Spencer Knight, Boston College
Best Defensive Forward		Marc McLaughlin, Boston College
Best Defensive Defenseman		Drew Helleson, Boston College
Rookie of the Year		Josh Lopina, Massachusetts; Nikita Nesterenko, Boston College
Goaltending Champion		Spencer Knight, Boston College
Len Ceglarski Sportmanship Award		Patrick Grasso, New Hampshire
Three Stars Award		Jonny Evans, Connecticut; Aidan McDonough, Northeastern; Marc McLaughlin, Boston College
Scoring Champion		Jonny Evans, Connecticut
Charlie Holt Team Sportsmanship Award		Massachusetts
Bob Kullen Award (Coach of the Year)		Jerry York, Boston College
Hockey East All-Star Teams
First Team	Position	Second Team
Spencer Knight, Boston College	G	Filip Lindberg, Massachusetts
David Farrance, Boston University	D	Jordan Harris, Northeastern
Drew Helleson, Boston College	D	Zac Jones, Massachusetts
Matthew Boldy, Boston College	F	Jackson Pierson, New Hampshire
Jonny Evans, Connecticut	F	Zach Solow, Northeastern
Bobby Trivigno, Massachusetts	F	Tyce Thompson, Providence
Third Team	Position	Rookie Team
Tomáš Vomáčka, Connecticut	G	Drew Commesso, Boston University
Marc Del Gaizo, Massachusetts	D	Eamon Powell, Boston College
Matthew Kessel, Massachusetts	D	—
Angus Crookshank, New Hampshire	F	Gunnarwolfe Fontaine, Northeastern
Jáchym Kondelík, Connecticut	F	Alex Jefferies, Merrimack
Marc McLaughlin, Boston College	F	Josh Lopina, Massachusetts
—	F	Nikita Nesterenko, Boston College
—	F	Luke Tuch, Boston University

=== Conference tournament ===
William Flynn Tournament Most Valuable Player
Bobby Trivigno		Massachusetts
All-Tournament team
Player	Pos	Team
Filip Lindberg	G	Massachusetts
Anthony Baxter	D	UMass Lowell
Zac Jones	D	Massachusetts
Matt Brown	F	UMass Lowell
Jake Gaudet	F	Massachusetts
Bobby Trivigno	F	Massachusetts

=== NCAA tournament ===
Most Outstanding Player
Bobby Trivigno		Massachusetts
All-Tournament team
Player	Pos	Team
Filip Lindberg	G	Massachusetts
Zac Jones	D	Massachusetts
Matthew Kessel	D	Massachusetts
Bobby Trivigno	F	Massachusetts

== 2021 NHL entry draft ==
Round	Pick	Player	College	NHL team
1	10	Tyler Boucher^{†}	Boston University	Ottawa Senators
2	40	Scott Morrow^{†}	Massachusetts	Carolina Hurricanes
3	88	Stiven Sardarian^{†}	New Hampshire	Buffalo Sabres
3	91	Taige Harding^{†}	Providence	Chicago Blackhawks
3	92	Andrei Buyalsky^{†}	Vermont	Colorado Avalanche
3	94	Aidan Hreschuk^{†}	Boston College	Carolina Hurricanes
4	98	Josh Lopina	Massachusetts	Anaheim Ducks
4	101	Guillaume Richard^{†}	Providence	Washington Capitals
4	115	Ryan Ufko^{†}	Massachusetts	Nashville Predators
6	171	Cal Thomas^{†}	Vermont	Arizona Coyotes
6	186	Shane Lachance^{†}	Boston University	Edmonton Oilers
6	192	Alex Gagne^{†}	New Hampshire	Tampa Bay Lightning
7	205	Arsenii Sergeev^{†}	Connecticut	Calgary Flames
7	213	Andre Gasseau^{†}	Boston College	Boston Bruins
7	217	Ty Gallagher^{†}	Boston University	Boston Bruins
7	220	Taylor Makar^{†}	Massachusetts	Colorado Avalanche

† incoming freshman
