= 2020–21 UMass Minutemen ice hockey season =

NCAA Division I National Champion Hockey East tournament, Champion 2021 NCAA tournament, Champion
- Conference: 3rd Hockey East
- Home ice: Mullins Center

Rankings
- USCHO: 1
- USA Today: 1

Record
- Overall: 20–5–4
- Conference: 13–5–4–1–1–1
- Home: 11–2–2
- Road: 5–3–2
- Neutral: 4–0–0

Coaches and captains
- Head coach: Greg Carvel
- Assistant coaches: Ben Barr; Jared DeMichiel; Ryan Bliss; Nolan Gluchowski
- Captain: Jake Gaudet
- Alternate captain(s): Marc Del Gaizo; Bobby Trivigno

The 2020–21 UMass Minutemen ice hockey season was the 89th season of play for the program, the 31st season competing at the Division I level, and the 27th season in the Hockey East conference. The Minutemen represented the University of Massachusetts Amherst and were coached by Greg Carvel, in his 5th season. UMass won the first national championship in program history.

== Season ==
As a result of the ongoing COVID-19 pandemic the entire college ice hockey season was delayed. Because the NCAA had previously announced that all winter sports athletes would retain whatever eligibility they possessed through at least the following year, none of Massachusetts' players would lose a season of play. However, the NCAA also approved a change in its transfer regulations that would allow players to transfer and play immediately rather than having to sit out a season, as the rules previously required.

=== Regular season ===
Despite high hopes, UMass got off to a rocky start. After winning their opening weekend, the Minutemen were swept by Boston College in a battle of top-10 teams. While the Maroon offense scored in both games, it was their goalies, who were normally stout in net, that let them down. The losses, however, weren't too damaging as BC was ranked #2 at the time and the team had plenty of time to recover. Unfortunately, the very next weekend the team could only manage a split with Merrimack. The Warriors were one of the league's worst teams (at least by reputation) and when the Minutemen could only manage a single shot on goal during the third period, they looked bad. The game was also marked by an odd occurrence; UMass typically rotated their starting goalies, having Matt Murray and Filip Lindberg alternate starts, which had happened in the first two weeks. However, Murray had started both games against Merrimack. When it happened again after a week off, Greg Carvel admitted that Lindberg had been injured and would be out for several weeks.

In the offseason, the coaches, in conjunction with both starting goalies, had agreed that it was time for one of the two to become the primary starter. The rotation at the start was supposed to be a way to determine which player would get the starring role but Lindberg's injury decided for the team. Murray got his shot in goal and won seven consecutive games in December and January. The run included three shutouts and the team was ranked near the top of the Hockey East standings. After the loss to Merrimack, the offense had also recovered; the team scored at least 4 goals in each game during Murray's winning streak. One of the biggest surprises was Carson Gicewicz, who scored 7 goals in that span, and nearly tied his career high in goals after just 12 games. Gicewicz had transferred from St. Lawrence, and was finally able to play for Carvel, who had recruited Gicewicz originally.

Murray's and Massachusetts' winning streak came crashing to an end in mid January. Boston University, who had played just 2 games to that point due to COVID-19, swept the Minutemen in consecutive games, scoring 4 goals in each outing. To make matters worse, they did so while being outshot by at least 15 goals in both games. The two poor efforts gave Lindberg, who had recovered by that point, a chance to earn the starting role. Less than a week later Lindberg was in net and shut out Providence and allow just one goal in the second game. The team could only earn ties since the offense had gone dormant, but the sterling performance set Lindberg in goal and he continued to pay dividends.

The next week the team faced its long-time rival Massachusetts–Lowell and swept the weekend. The Minutemen were able to win at the Tsongas Center for the first time in over a decade while Lindberg was named as the Hockey East defensive player of the week. Lindberg's 0.50 goals against average since returning left little doubt that he was the team's starting goaltender and, with him acting as a wall in the crease, the offense was able to return to life. Unfortunately, everything was put on pause for several weeks due to the coronavirus. Due to a growing number of cases on the Amherst campus, UMass paused all athletic programs for several weeks. This prevented the Minutemen from being able to improve their conference ranking and, due to Hockey East using a power index rather than winning percentage, the four losses to BC and BU left the team unable to rise higher than third in the conference.

After a three-week layoff, UMass returned with a vengeance. The Minutemen poured it on in a 8–1 drubbing of Providence and then earned a hard-fought win over Boston College. The victories put them solidly in the top-10 for national rankings even with a disappointing effort against Maine to end the regular season. Massachusetts was essentially guaranteed a spot in the NCAA tournament but the Minutemen were determined to make a statement.

=== Hockey East tournament ===
As the #3 seed, they opened the postseason against Northeastern and got off to a great start, scoring twice in the first 9 minutes. The Huskies were able to cut the lead in half in the second period but Lindberg allowed nothing afterwards and UMass skated to a 4–1 victory. They met Providence in the semifinal and the Friars were looking for revenge after the previous game. The game started with a flurry of goals, 3 in the opening 9 minutes, but it was Providence who took an early 2–1 lead. Zac Jones tied the game before the period was over and, after a wild first 20-minutes, UMass put the clamps on Providence. Bobby Trivigno scored early in the second and then the defense shone, allowing just 3 shots against in the period. Providence was forced to open up the game in the third but all that served to do was give UMass the chance to extend its lead and eventually win the game 5–2.

The win sent Massachusetts to just its second Hockey East championship game (the first since 2004) and they were facing a surprising Lowell squad that had defeated both BC and BU. The Lowell defense played a tremendous game in the final, limiting UMass to just 22 shots in the contest. Henry Welsch allowed 1 goal in the first and then shut the door on the Minutemen but Lindberg was perfect in the game, stopping all 16 shots and leading UMass to its first Hockey East Championship. This was the first conference title for the program since 1972, before the NCAA even used numerical divisions. Trivigno was named Tournament Most Valuable Player, leading the Minutemen with 6 points.

=== NCAA tournament ===
Even with the Hockey East title, UMass was only able to jump up to 5th in NCAA selection committee's rankings and had to settle for a #2 seed in the tournament. The Minutemen began the tournament against Lake Superior State, who were making their first appearance in 25 years, but UMass wasn't about to give them a welcome return. After a mostly even first period, Massachusetts blew the game open in the second, outshooting the Lakers 18–7 and took a commanding 3–1 lead. After Jake Gaudet scored his second of the game in the third there was little hope for LSSU and UMass coasted to a 5–1 win. In the regional final, UMass was in control of the game from the start but Bemidji seeped up to the challenge for a time. Enter Carson Gicewicz, who opened the scoring on a penalty kill after the 14-minute mark and then tallied again before the end of the first. Gicewicz completed his hat-trick in the second, the only one in his collegiate career, and put the game out of reach for the Beavers. BSU tried to get back into the game but the UMass defense was too good and Lindberg earned his fourth shutout of the season.

=== Frozen Four ===
Massachusetts headed to its second Frozen Four (the other coming in 2019) and were looking forward to a rematch with Minnesota Duluth. Just days prior to the game, the Minutemen lost 4 players due to COVID protocols; While Duluth would be without their backup goalie, UMass lost the services of their leading goal scorer, Gicewicz, and their starting goalie, Lindberg, as well as Jerry Harding and Henry Graham. Missing two star players were bad enough but the loss of Graham meant that the team was down to just a single goaltender on the roster. Zac Steigmeyer, a senior and assistant equipment manager, had played goalie in high school and was dragooned into service as an emergency backup. When the team made it onto the ice, they faced a very experienced team with a defense nearly as impressive as their own. The Bulldogs took over the game in sports, especially in the middle frame, but they were never able to distance themselves from the Minutemen. Zac Jones opened the scoring near the end of the first on the power play and then the team had to weather an offensive storm from UMD. Matt Murray hadn't played a game for two and a half months but his performance didn't show any rust. He allowed two goals but turned aside 36 shots, including everything in the third, to allow UMass to tie the game and send the match into overtime. In the extra session the Minutemen took control and carried the play for nearly the entire time. Umass fired 13 shots on goal, compared with UMD's 2, and it only seemed like a matter of time before they would break through. When Trivigno flew around the back of the net and slid the puck across the front of the goal for a Garrett Wait tap-in, the small but enthusiastic crowd erupted.

==== National Championship ====
After overcoming their biggest challenge of the season, UMass received good news; both Gicewicz and Lindberg tested negative for COVID and drove overnight to Pittsburgh so they could play in the championship game. The Minutemen were making their second consecutive appearance in the title match and faced St. Cloud State in their first championship appearance. UMass got off to a good start, getting a goal from Aaron Bohlinger to open the scoring, and then the two teams played a mostly defensive battle for the remainder of the first. While killing off a penalty, a UMass defender grabbed the puck out of the air and threw it into center ice. A penalty for delay-of-game could have been called but nothing was forthcoming, much to the displeasure of the St. Cloud bench. Just minutes later, Massachusetts scored their second goal of the game. Upon review, however, it appeared that the play was offside and that the goal would be disallowed. Fortunately for the Minutemen, the play was allowed to stand and their two-goal lead held. The controversial calls didn't take the fight out of St. Cloud, who quadrupled their shot total in the second, but when Philip Lagunov scored an astounding goal on the penalty kill, the game looked to be slipping away from the Huskies. Matthew Kessel's power play marker later in the period all but sealed the game and the two teams played a fairly pedestrian third period, ending with UMass up 5–0 to win the program's first national championship.

Trivigno was named Tournament Most Outstanding Player, making up for having been suspended for the Championship game two years earlier. Filip Lindberg set an NCAA record with a 0.33 GAA in the tournament, breaking the single-tournament record of 0.50 held by several goaltenders including Parker Milner (2012), Tim Regan (1972) and Ken Dryden (1967).

Henry Graham sat out the season.

== Departures ==
Player	Position	Nationality	Cause
Marco Bozzo	Forward	Canada	Transferred to Northeastern
Alex Camarre	Goaltender	United States	Left program
Mitchell Chaffee	Forward	United States	Signed professional contract (Minnesota Wild)
Jeremy Davidson	Forward	United States	Returned to juniors (Fargo Force)
Niko Hildenbrand	Forward	United States	Graduation
Bobby Kaiser	Forward	United States	Left program
John Leonard	Forward	United States	Signed professional contract (San Jose Sharks)
Jake McLaughlin	Defenseman	United States	Graduation (Signed with Henderson Silver Knights)
Peyton Reeves	Forward	Canada	Transferred to Toronto
Jack Suter	Forward	United States	Graduation (Signed with Rapid City Rush)

== Recruiting ==
Player	Position	Nationality	Age	Notes
Linden Alger	Defenseman	United States	20	Centerville, MA
Aaron Bohlinger	Defenseman	United States	20	Walden, NY
Carson Gicewicz	Forward	United States	23	Orchard Park, NY; transfer from St. Lawrence
Henry Graham	Goaltender	United States	20	Manhattan, NY
Jerry Harding	Forward	United States	21	Canton, MA; transfer from Providence
Josh Lopina	Forward	United States	19	Minooka, IL
Oliver MacDonald	Forward	United States	19	Grosse Pointe, MI
Zac Steigmeyer	Goaltender	United States	22	Ludlow, MA; emergency goaltender
Ryan Sullivan	Forward	United States	20	Grosse Pointe, MI
Garrett Wait	Forward	United States	22	Edina, MN; transfer from Minnesota

== Roster ==
As of February 12, 2021.

No.	Nat.	Player	Class	Pos	Height	Weight	DoB	Hometown	Previous team	NHL rights
1	(United States)	Zac Steigmeyer	Senior	G	5' 10" (1.78 m)	150 lb (68 kg)		Ludlow, Massachusetts	Pope Francis High (US-Prep)	—
2	(United States)	Marc Del Gaizo (A)	Junior	D	5' 10" (1.78 m)	181 lb (82 kg)	1999-10-11	Basking Ridge, New Jersey	Muskegon Lumberjacks (USHL)	NSH, 109th overall 2019
3	(United States)	Ty Farmer	Junior	D	5' 11" (1.8 m)	175 lb (79 kg)	1998-01-06	O'Fallon, Missouri	Fargo Force (USHL)	—
4	(United States)	Matthew Kessel	Sophomore	D	6' 3" (1.91 m)	203 lb (92 kg)	2000-06-23	Bloomfield Hills, Michigan	Sioux Falls Stampede (USHL)	STL, 150th overall 2020
5	(United States)	Linden Alger	Freshman	D	6' 3" (1.91 m)	194 lb (88 kg)	2000-04-09	Centerville, Massachusetts	Youngstown Phantoms (USHL)	—
6	(United States)	Kolby Vegara	Junior	D	6' 1" (1.85 m)	193 lb (88 kg)	1997-07-15	Malden, Massachusetts	Philadelphia Rebels (NAHL)	—
7	(United States)	Cal Kiefiuk	Sophomore	F	5' 10" (1.78 m)	185 lb (84 kg)	2000-02-28	Macomb, Michigan	Central Illinois Flying Aces (USHL)	—
8	(United States)	Bobby Trivigno (A)	Junior	F	5' 8" (1.73 m)	162 lb (73 kg)	1999-01-19	Setauket, New York	Waterloo Black Hawks (USHL)	—
10	(United States)	Josh Lopina	Freshman	F	6' 2" (1.88 m)	194 lb (88 kg)	2001-02-16	Minooka, Illinois	Lincoln Stars (USHL)	—
11	(United States)	Carson Gicewicz	Senior (RS)	F	6' 3" (1.91 m)	213 lb (97 kg)	1997-03-04	Orchard Park, New York	St. Lawrence (ECAC)	—
12	(United States)	Garrett Wait	Junior	F	6' 0" (1.83 m)	190 lb (86 kg)	1998-06-13	Edina, Minnesota	Minnesota (Big Ten)	—
13	(United States)	Reed Lebster	Sophomore	F	6' 0" (1.83 m)	188 lb (85 kg)	1999-03-04	Grand Rapids, Michigan	Des Moines Buccaneers (USHL)	—
15	(United States)	Oliver MacDonald	Freshman	F	5' 10" (1.78 m)	185 lb (84 kg)	2000-11-07	Grosse Pointe, Michigan	Fargo Force (USHL)	—
17	(Canada)	Philip Lagunov	Senior	F	6' 0" (1.83 m)	188 lb (85 kg)	1998-11-22	Hamilton, Ontario	Burlington Cougars (OJHL)	—
18	(Canada)	Jake Gaudet (C)	Senior	F	6' 2" (1.88 m)	201 lb (91 kg)	1996-06-18	Ottawa, Ontario	Kemptville 73's (CCHL)	—
19	(United States)	Ryan Sullivan	Freshman	F	5' 11" (1.8 m)	190 lb (86 kg)	2000-03-07	Grosse Pointe, Michigan	Sioux Falls Stampede (USHL)	—
20	(Canada)	Oliver Chau	Senior	F	5' 9" (1.75 m)	164 lb (74 kg)	1997-08-21	Oakville, Ontario	Brooks Bandits (AJHL)	—
22	(United States)	Jerry Harding	Sophomore	F	6' 2" (1.88 m)	210 lb (95 kg)	1999-03-22	Canton, Massachusetts	Providence (HEA)	—
23	(Canada)	Gianfranco Cassaro	Sophomore	D	5' 11" (1.8 m)	194 lb (88 kg)	1999-03-30	Nobleton, Ontario	Youngstown Phantoms (USHL)	—
24	(United States)	Zac Jones	Sophomore	D	5' 10" (1.78 m)	172 lb (78 kg)	2000-10-18	Glen Allen, Virginia	Tri-City Storm (USHL)	NYR, 68th overall 2019
25	(United States)	Aaron Bohlinger	Freshman	D	5' 9" (1.75 m)	165 lb (75 kg)	2000-08-25	Walden, New York	Waterloo Black Hawks (USHL)	—
26	(United States)	Colin Felix	Junior	D	6' 1" (1.85 m)	193 lb (88 kg)	1999-01-07	Ocean City, New Jersey	Madison Capitols (USHL)	—
27	(United States)	Anthony Del Gaizo	Junior	F	5' 10" (1.78 m)	193 lb (88 kg)	1998-01-31	Basking Ridge, New Jersey	Muskegon Lumberjacks (USHL)	—
28	(Canada)	Eric Faith	Sophomore	F	5' 11" (1.8 m)	181 lb (82 kg)	1998-04-18	Carp, Ontario	Brockville Braves (CCHL)	—
29	(United States)	George Mika	Senior	F	5' 11" (1.8 m)	184 lb (83 kg)	1996-10-19	Naples, Florida	Amarillo Bulls (NAHL)	—
31	(Canada)	Matt Murray	Senior	G	6' 1" (1.85 m)	194 lb (88 kg)	1998-02-02	St. Albert, Alberta	Fargo Force (USHL)	—
32	(United States)	Henry Graham	Freshman	G	6' 0" (1.83 m)	181 lb (82 kg)	2000-07-25	Manhattan, New York	P.A.L. Jr. Islanders (NCDC)	—
35	(Finland)	Filip Lindberg	Junior	G	6' 1" (1.85 m)	194 lb (88 kg)	1999-01-31	Espoo, Finland	TUTO U20 (Nuorten SM-liiga)	MIN, 197th overall 2019

== Standings ==
2020–21 Hockey East Standings
	Conference record										Overall record					
	GP	W	L	T	OTW	OTL	SOW	HEPI	GF	GA	GP	W	L	T	GF	GA
#6 Boston College	21	16	4	1	3	2	0	58.61	82	46	24	17	6	1	91	58
#11 Boston University	14	10	3	1	3	1	1	56.36	49	37	16	10	5	1	52	45
#1 Massachusetts *	22	13	5	4	1	1	1	55.44	76	42	29	20	5	4	103	48
Connecticut	22	10	10	2	1	4	2	52.01	69	63	23	10	11	2	70	69
#16 Providence	23	10	8	5	0	0	2	50.80	63	61	25	11	9	5	71	67
Northeastern	20	9	8	3	1	0	3	49.94	68	60	21	9	9	3	69	64
#19 Massachusetts–Lowell	16	7	8	1	1	1	0	48.00	46	53	20	10	9	1	59	63
Maine	15	3	10	2	0	1	2	46.66	41	61	16	3	11	2	43	68
Merrimack	18	5	11	2	0	1	0	45.38	47	66	18	5	11	2	47	66
New Hampshire	21	5	13	3	3	2	2	43.66	51	83	23	6	14	3	60	88
Vermont	12	1	9	2	0	0	0	38.02	17	37	13	1	10	2	20	42
Championship: March 20, 2021; No Regular Season Champion Awarded * indicates conference tournament champion (Lamoriello Trophy); Rankings: USCHO.com Top 20 Poll

== Schedule and results ==
Date	Time	Opponent^{#}	Rank^{#}	Site	TV	Decision	Result	Attendance	Record
Regular season
November 20	6:00 PM	vs. Connecticut	#7	Mullins Center • Amherst, Massachusetts	NESN+	Murray	W 5–1	0	1–0–0 (1–0–0)
November 21	4:00 PM	at Connecticut	#7	XL Center • Hartford, Connecticut		Lindberg	T 2–2 ^{SOL}	0	1–0–1 (1–0–1)
November 27	6:00 PM	at #2 Boston College	#7	Conte Forum • Chestnut Hill, Massachusetts	NESN	Murray	L 3–4	0	1–1–1 (1–1–1)
November 28	4:30 PM	vs. #2 Boston College	#7	Mullins Center • Amherst, Massachusetts	NESN+	Lindberg	L 3–6	0	1–2–1 (1–2–1)
December 5	4:30 PM	vs. Merrimack	#8	Mullins Center • Amherst, Massachusetts	NESN+	Murray	W 3–1	0	2–2–1 (2–2–1)
December 6	4:35 PM	at Merrimack	#8	J. Thom Lawler Rink • North Andover, Massachusetts		Murray	L 2–3	0	2–3–1 (2–3–1)
December 19	6:00 PM	vs. Vermont	#10	Mullins Center • Amherst, Massachusetts	NESN	Murray	W 4–0	0	3–3–1 (3–3–1)
December 20	6:00 PM	vs. Vermont	#10	Mullins Center • Amherst, Massachusetts	NESN	Murray	W 4–1	0	4–3–1 (4–3–1)
December 23	3:30 PM	vs. Connecticut	#10	Mullins Center • Amherst, Massachusetts	NESN	Murray	W 6–2	0	5–3–1 (5–3–1)
December 30	3:30 PM	at New Hampshire	#9	Whittemore Center • Durham, New Hampshire		Murray	W 4–0	0	6–3–1 (6–3–1)
January 1	7:05 PM	at #13 Northeastern	#9	Matthews Arena • Boston, Massachusetts	NESN	Murray	W 4–3	0	7–3–1 (7–3–1)
January 2	6:00 PM	vs. #13 Northeastern	#9	Mullins Center • Amherst, Massachusetts	NESN+	Murray	W 5–3	0	8–3–1 (8–3–1)
January 6	3:30 PM	vs. New Hampshire	#8	Mullins Center • Amherst, Massachusetts		Murray	W 4–0	0	9–3–1 (9–3–1)
January 17	3:30 PM	vs. Boston University	#6	Mullins Center • Amherst, Massachusetts	NESN	Murray	L 2–4	0	9–4–1 (9–4–1)
January 18	3:05 PM	at Boston University	#9	Agganis Arena • Boston, Massachusetts		Murray	L 3–4 ^{OT}	0	9–5–1 (9–5–1)
January 22	3:00 PM	vs. #18 Providence	#9	Mullins Center • Amherst, Massachusetts		Lindberg	T 0–0 ^{SOL}	0	9–5–2 (9–5–2)
January 23	7:00 PM	at #18 Providence	#9	Schneider Arena • Providence, Rhode Island	NESN+	Lindberg	T 1–1 ^{SOW}	0	9–5–3 (9–5–3)
January 29	8:00 PM	vs. #16 Massachusetts–Lowell	#10	Mullins Center • Amherst, Massachusetts		Lindberg	W 5–0	0	10–5–3 (10–5–3)
January 30	7:00 PM	vs. #16 Massachusetts–Lowell	#10	Tsongas Center • Lowell, Massachusetts		Lindberg	W 2–1	0	11–5–3 (11–5–3)
February 23	7:00 PM	at #14 Providence	#9	Schneider Arena • Providence, Rhode Island		Lindberg	W 8–1	0	12–5–3 (12–5–3)
February 26	7:00 PM	at #1 Boston College	#9	Conte Forum • Chestnut Hill, Massachusetts	NESN+	Lindberg	W 3–2 ^{OT}	0	13–5–3 (13–5–3)
March 5	2:30 PM	vs. Maine	#6	Mullins Center • Amherst, Massachusetts	NESN	Lindberg	T 3–3 ^{SOL}	0	13–5–4 (13–5–4)
Hockey East tournament
March 14	4:30 PM	vs. #20 Northeastern*	#7	Mullins Center • Amherst, Massachusetts (Hockey East Quarterfinal)	NESN+	Lindberg	W 4–1	0	14–5–4
March 17	7:00 PM	vs. #14 Providence*	#7	Mullins Center • Amherst, Massachusetts (Hockey East Semifinal)	NESN	Lindberg	W 5–2	0	15–5–4
March 20	7:00 PM	vs. #14 Massachusetts–Lowell*	#7	Mullins Center • Amherst, Massachusetts (Hockey East Championship)		Lindberg	W 1–0	0	16–5–4
NCAA tournament
March 26	6:30 PM	vs. #13 Lake Superior State*	#6	Webster Bank Arena • Bridgeport, Connecticut (NCAA East Regional semifinal)	ESPNU	Lindberg	W 5–1	100	17–5–4
March 27	4:00 PM	vs. #14 Bemidji State*	#6	Webster Bank Arena • Bridgeport, Connecticut (NCAA East Regional Final)	ESPNU	Lindberg	W 4–0	0	18–5–4
April 8	9:00 PM	vs. #9 Minnesota Duluth*	#6	PPG Paints Arena • Pittsburgh, Pennsylvania (NCAA National semifinal)	ESPN2	Murray	W 3–2 ^{OT}	3,660	19–5–4
April 10	7:00 PM	vs. #7 St. Cloud State*	#6	PPG Paints Arena • Pittsburgh, Pennsylvania (NCAA national championship)	ESPN	Lindberg	W 5–0	3,963	20–5–4
*Non-conference game. ^{#}Rankings from USCHO.com Poll. All times are in Eastern Time.

== 2021 National Championship ==
=== (E2) Massachusetts vs. (NE2) St. Cloud State ===
April 10, 2021; 7:00 PM	(E2) Massachusetts	5 – 0	(NE2) St. Cloud State	PPG Paints Arena, Pittsburgh, Pennsylvania; Attendance: 3,963

Game reference

Scoring summary
Period	Team	Goal	Assist(s)	Time	Score
1st	UMA	Aaron Bohlinger (1) – GW	Sullivan and Farmer	7:26	1–0 UMA
1st	UMA	Reed Lebster (2)	Kiefiuk	18:56	2–0 UMA
2nd	UMA	Philip Lagunov (6) – SH	unassisted	25:10	3–0 UMA
2nd	UMA	Matthew Kessel (10) – PP	Chau and Gaudet	33:45	4–0 UMA
3rd	UMA	Bobby Trivigno (11)	Lebster	46:00	5–0 UMA
Penalty summary
Period	Team	Player	Penalty	Time	PIM
1st	UMA	Anthony Del Gaizo	Slashing	15:27	2:00
2nd	STC	Seamus Donohue	Tripping	20:24	2:00
2nd	UMA	Ryan Sullivan	Tripping	23:57	2:00
2nd	UMA	Jake Gaudet	Elbowing	30:31	2:00
2nd	STC	Bench (served by Zach Okabe)	Too Many Men	32:35	2:00
3rd	None				

Shots by period
Team	1	2	3	T
St. Cloud State	3	12	10	25
Massachusetts	7	6	9	22

Goaltenders
Team	Name	Saves	Goals against	Time on ice
STC	Dávid Hrenák	17	5	60:00
UMA	Filip Lindberg	25	0	60:00

== Scoring statistics ==
Name	Position	Games	Goals	Assists	Points	PIM
Bobby Trivigno	F	29	11	23	34	12
Oliver Chau	C	29	5	22	27	4
Carson Gicewicz	C	28	17	7	24	37
Zac Jones	D	29	9	15	24	8
Matthew Kessel	D	29	10	13	23	16
Josh Lopina	F	29	9	14	23	12
Garrett Wait	LW	29	9	8	17	10
Marc Del Gaizo	D	27	3	11	14	4
Jake Gaudet	C	28	5	8	13	31
Aaron Bohlinger	D	29	1	11	12	6
Colin Felix	D	29	0	10	10	32
Cal Kiefiuk	F	22	5	4	9	8
Philip Lagunov	C	25	4	2	6	21
Ty Farmer	D	24	3	3	6	12
Jerry Harding	F	25	2	4	6	10
Oliver MacDonald	F	17	2	3	5	8
Anthony Del Gaizo	F	28	2	3	5	16
Eric Faith	LW	18	1	4	5	2
George Mika	F	17	3	1	4	0
Ryan Sullivan	F	25	0	4	4	4
Reed Lebster	F	12	2	1	3	2
Matt Murray	G	14	0	1	1	0
Kolby Vegara	D	6	0	0	0	4
Linden Alger	D	7	0	0	0	0
Gianfranco Cassaro	D	10	0	0	0	0
Filip Lindberg	G	15	0	0	0	0
Bench	-	-	-	-	-	4
Total			103	172	275	263

== Goaltending statistics ==
Name	Games	Minutes	Wins	Losses	Ties	Goals against	Saves	Shut outs	SV %	GAA
Filip Lindberg	15	918	10	1	4	19	357	5	.949	1.24
Matt Murray	14	851	10	4	0	28	308	3	.917	1.97
Empty Net	-	9	-	-	-	1	-	-	-	-
Total	29	1778	20	5	4	48	665	8	.933	1.62

== Rankings ==
Poll	Week																					
Poll	Pre	1	2	3	4	5	6	7	8	9	10	11	12	13	14	15	16	17	18	19	20	21 (Final)
USCHO.com	7	7	7	8	10	10	10	9	8	6	9	10	10	9	10	9	6	7	6	6	-	1
USA Today	7	7	8	9	12	13	10	9	8	6	8	10	9	9	9	9	6	8	7	5	2	1

USCHO did not release a poll in week 20.

== Awards and honors ==
Player	Award	Ref
Bobby Trivigno	NCAA tournament Most Outstanding Player	
Bobby Trivigno	AHCA East First Team All-American	
Zac Jones	AHCA East Second Team All-American	
Filip Lindberg	NCAA All-Tournament Team	
Zac Jones	NCAA All-Tournament Team	
Matthew Kessel	NCAA All-Tournament Team	
Bobby Trivigno	NCAA All-Tournament Team	
Bobby Trivigno	Walter Brown Award	
Josh Lopina	Hockey East Rookie of the Year	
Bobby Trivigno	William Flynn Tournament Most Valuable Player	
Bobby Trivigno	Hockey East First Team	
Filip Lindberg	Hockey East Second Team	
Zac Jones	Hockey East Second Team	
Marc Del Gaizo	Hockey East Third Team	
Matthew Kessel	Hockey East Third Team	
Josh Lopina	Hockey East Rookie Team	
Filip Lindberg	Hockey East All-Tournament Team	
Zac Jones	Hockey East All-Tournament Team	
Jake Gaudet	Hockey East All-Tournament Team	
Bobby Trivigno	Hockey East All-Tournament Team	

== Players drafted into the NHL ==
=== 2021 NHL entry draft ===
Round	Pick	Player	NHL team
2	40	Scott Morrow^{†}	Carolina Hurricanes
4	98	Josh Lopina	Anaheim Ducks
4	115	Ryan Ufko^{†}	Nashville Predators
7	220	Taylor Makar^{†}	Colorado Avalanche

† incoming freshman
