= 2020–21 American International Yellow Jackets men's ice hockey season =

Atlantic Hockey, Champion Atlantic Hockey Tournament, Champion NCAA Tournament, Regional semifinals
- Conference: 1st Atlantic Hockey
- Home ice: MassMutual Center

Rankings
- USCHO: 15
- USA Today: 15

Record
- Overall: 15–4–0
- Conference: 11–1–0–1–0–0
- Home: 11–2–0
- Road: 4–1–0
- Neutral: 0–1–0

Coaches and captains
- Head coach: Eric Lang
- Assistant coaches: Cory Schneider; Patrick Tabb
- Captain(s): Brennan Kapcheck; Parker Revering
- Alternate captain(s): Chris Dodero; Luka Maver

The 2020–21 American International Yellow Jackets men's ice hockey season was the 73rd season of play for the program, the 25th at the Division I level, and the 18th season in the Atlantic Hockey conference. The Yellow Jackets represented American International College and were coached by Eric Lang, in his 5th season.

The start of the college hockey season was delayed due to the ongoing coronavirus pandemic. As a result, American International's first scheduled game was in late-November as opposed to early-October, which was the norm.

== Season ==
As a result of the ongoing COVID-19 pandemic the entire college ice hockey season was delayed. Because the NCAA had previously announced that all winter sports athletes would retain whatever eligibility they possessed through at least the following year, none of American International's players would lose a season of play. However, the NCAA also approved a change in its transfer regulations that would allow players to transfer and play immediately rather than having to sit out a season, as the rules previously required.

American International entered the season needing to replace a great deal of experience on its roster. The Yellow Jackets had more than a third of the previous team's players leave, mostly through graduation, and the remaining upperclassmen would need to remain steady while the coaching staff brought the new players along. The large influx of players included the program's first ever NHL draft pick in Jake Kucharski, a transfer from Providence, which demonstrated how much the program had risen in Eric Lang's short time as head coach. The team got off to a good start, winning their first five matches, but AIC faced its first big test in late December when they played Quinnipiac. The Yellow Jackets were embarrassed in the first game but recovered in the second; though they lost the team did show that it could compete with other ranked teams. As a result, the team's national ranking fell just one spot despite losing both games.

AIC played well over the next month, going 8–1 and placing themselves as the team to beat in Atlantic Hockey. Unfortunately, COVID cancellations torpedoed the team's schedule and the Yellow Jackets didn't play a single game over the succeeding 7 weeks. Even the team's quarterfinal match in the conference tournament was scratched due to COVID. When the Jackets finally played a game the team looked a bit out of sorts. They were finally able to knock some of the rust off in the third period of their semifinal game to escape with a 2–1 win. They had to come from behind to win the championship as well but the title gave AIC every league crown for a three-year period, making them the first Atlantic Hockey program to achieve that feat.

Despite a stellar 15–3 record and both conference championships (regular- and post-season) AIC was given the 16th-overall seed in the NCAA Tournament and had to face top-seeded North Dakota in the opening round. The Yellow Jackets still appeared rusty at the start of the game, surrendering 4 goals and being outshot 7–13. The huge lead allowed UND to hang back and play defense for the remainder of the match, giving the Jackets few opportunities to cut into the lead. AIC eventually lost 1–5 but the question remains; just how badly was the team affected by their neatly 2-month layoff?

== Departures ==
| Player | Position | Nationality | Cause |
|---|---|---|---|
| Austin Albrecht | Forward | United States | Signed professional contract (Wichita Thunder) |
| Calvon Boots | Defenseman | United States | Transferred to RIT |
| Blake Christensen | Forward | United States | Graduation (Signed with Bakersfield Condors) |
| Patrik Demel | Defenseman | Czech Republic | Graduation (Signed with HC Litvínov) |
| Nate Hooper | Forward | Canada | Transferred to Lakehead |
| Jānis Jaks | Defenseman | Latvia | Graduation (Signed with Bakersfield Condors) |
| Joel Kocur | Goaltender | Canada | Graduation |
| Niko Luka | Defenseman | United States | Graduation |
| Martin Mellberg | Forward | Sweden | Graduation (Signed with Almtuna IS) |
| Jared Pike | Forward | United States | Graduation (Signed with Utah Grizzlies) |
| Hugo Reinhardt | Forward | Sweden | Graduation (Signed with Timrå IK) |
| Zackarias Skog | Goaltender | Sweden | Graduation (Signed with Västerviks IK) |
| Jan Štefka | Forward | Czech Republic | Signed professional contract (HC ZUBR Přerov) |
| Kyle Stephan | Forward | Canada | Graduation |
| Justin Wilson | Forward | Canada | Left program |

== Recruiting ==
| Player | Position | Nationality | Age | Notes |
|---|---|---|---|---|
| Verners Egle | Forward | Latvia | 21 | Liepāja, LAT; left program after 1 game (Signed with HK Liepāja) |
| Zak Galambos | Defenseman | United States | 23 | Walnut Creek, CA; transfer from Minnesota State |
| Aaron Grounds | Forward | United States | 20 | Jamestown, ND |
| Kyle Jeffers | Forward | United States | 21 | Oviedo, FL |
| Julius Janhonen | Forward | Finland | 21 | Espoo, FIN |
| Jan Kern | Forward | Czech Republic | 21 | Prague, CZE |
| Jake Kucharski | Goaltender | United States | 21 | Erie, PA; Selected 197th overall in 2018; transfer from Providence |
| Darwin Lakoduk | Forward | Canada | 20 | Edmonton, AB |
| Ryan McInchak | Goaltender | United States | 21 | Trenton, MI |
| Sam Miller | Defenseman | United States | 21 | Pewaukee, WI |
| Matthew Rickard | Defenseman | United States | 21 | Coventry, RI |
| Nico Somerville | Defenseman | Canada | 21 | Port Alberni, BC |
| Adam Stacho | Forward | Slovakia | 21 | Trenčín, SVK |
| Michal Stínil | Forward | Czech Republic | 21 | Děčín, CZE |
| Justin Young | Forward | Canada | 22 | Leduc, AB; transfer from Alaska |

== Roster ==
As of September 27, 2020.

| No. | Nat. | Player | Class | Pos | Height | Weight | DoB | Hometown | Previous team | NHL rights |
|---|---|---|---|---|---|---|---|---|---|---|
| 1 | (United States) | Jake Kucharski | Freshman (RS) | G | 6' 4" (1.93 m) | 220 lb (100 kg) | 1999-09-25 | Erie, Pennsylvania | Providence (HEA) | CAR, 197th overall 2018 |
| 2 | (Canada) | Nico Somerville | Freshman | D | 5' 9" (1.75 m) | 190 lb (86 kg) | 1999-04-08 | Nanaimo, British Columbia | Penticton (BCHL) | — |
| 3 | (Czech Republic) | Jan Kern | Freshman | F | 5' 11" (1.8 m) | 190 lb (86 kg) | 1999-07-27 | Prague, Czech Republic | Youngstown (USHL) | — |
| 4 | (United States) | Brett Callahan | Sophomore | D | 5' 10" (1.78 m) | 182 lb (83 kg) | 1998-10-16 | Westmont, Illinois | Jersey (NCDC) | — |
| 5 | (United States) | Matt Rickard | Freshman | D | 6' 0" (1.83 m) | 170 lb (77 kg) | 1999-07-28 | Coventry, Rhode Island | Lone Star (NAHL) | — |
| 6 | (United States) | Jeff Baum | Senior | D | 5' 11" (1.8 m) | 185 lb (84 kg) | 1996-06-17 | Colleyville, Texas | Providence (HEA) | — |
| 7 | (Sweden) | Oskar Strömberg | Senior | D | 6' 7" (2.01 m) | 230 lb (104 kg) | 1996-11-26 | Sollentuna, Sweden | New Jersey (NAHL) | — |
| 8 | (United States) | Brennan Kapcheck (C) | Senior | D | 5' 9" (1.75 m) | 170 lb (77 kg) | 1996-11-17 | Mount Prospect, Illinois | Aston (NAHL) | — |
| 9 | (United States) | Blake Bennett | Sophomore | F | 5' 8" (1.73 m) | 195 lb (88 kg) | 1998-07-01 | Grand Island, New York | Corpus Christi (NAHL) | — |
| 10 | (Slovakia) | Adam Stacho | Freshman | F | 5' 11" (1.8 m) | 190 lb (86 kg) | 1999-05-28 | Očkov, Slovakia | Bismarck (NAHL) | — |
| 11 | (Finland) | Julius Janhonen | Freshman | F | 6' 1" (1.85 m) | 180 lb (82 kg) | 1999-03-05 | Espoo, Finland | HIFK U20 (Nuorten SM-liiga) | — |
| 12 | (United States) | Eric Otto | Freshman (RS) | F | 6' 1" (1.85 m) | 175 lb (79 kg) | 1997-07-19 | Burnsville, Minnesota | Chicago (USHL) | — |
| 13 | (Latvia) | Verners Egle ^{†} | Freshman | F | 6' 1" (1.85 m) | 190 lb (86 kg) | 1999-06-01 | Liepāja, Latvia | Madison (USHL) | — |
| 15 | (Slovakia) | Matus Spodniak | Junior | F | 5' 11" (1.8 m) | 200 lb (91 kg) | 1997-12-22 | Košice, Slovakia | Ogden (WSHL) | — |
| 16 | (United States) | Kyle Jeffers | Freshman | F | 5' 10" (1.78 m) | 165 lb (75 kg) | 1999-01-06 | Winter Springs, Florida | New Jersey (NAHL) | — |
| 17 | (United States) | Zak Galambos | Sophomore (RS) | D | 6' 2" (1.88 m) | 185 lb (84 kg) | 1997-04-04 | Walnut Creek, California | Minnesota State (WCHA) | — |
| 18 | (United States) | Michal Stinil | Freshman | F | 5' 11" (1.8 m) | 195 lb (88 kg) | 1999-03-21 | East Burke, Vermont | Lone Star (NAHL) | — |
| 19 | (United States) | Elijiah Barriga | Junior (RS) | F | 5' 11" (1.8 m) | 193 lb (88 kg) | 1996-05-16 | West Covina, California | UNLV (ACHA) | — |
| 20 | (Norway) | Tobias Fladeby | Senior | F | 6' 0" (1.83 m) | 191 lb (87 kg) | 1996-05-20 | Asker, Norway | Bismarck (NAHL) | — |
| 21 | (United States) | Justin Cole | Junior (RS) | F | 6' 3" (1.91 m) | 205 lb (93 kg) | 1996-05-01 | Bryn Athyn, Pennsylvania | Cedar Rapids (USHL) | — |
| 22 | (United States) | Parker Revering (C) | Junior | D | 6' 1" (1.85 m) | 200 lb (91 kg) | 1997-01-11 | Alexandria, Minnesota | Brookings (NAHL) | — |
| 23 | (United States) | Aaron Grounds | Freshman | F | 6' 2" (1.88 m) | 190 lb (86 kg) | 1999-12-24 | Jamestown, North Dakota | Fargo (USHL) | — |
| 25 | (Slovenia) | Luka Maver (A) | Junior (RS) | F | 6' 3" (1.91 m) | 195 lb (88 kg) | 1997-10-25 | Ljubljana, Slovenia | Lincoln (USHL) | — |
| 26 | (Canada) | Chris Theodore | Junior | F | 5' 7" (1.7 m) | 180 lb (82 kg) | 1997-10-15 | Beaconsfield, Quebec | Cornwall (CCHL) | — |
| 27 | (United States) | Hunter Johannes | Sophomore | F | 6' 3" (1.91 m) | 210 lb (95 kg) | 1998-07-24 | Eden Prairie, Minnesota | Jamestown (NAHL) | — |
| 28 | (Sweden) | Jake Stella | Sophomore | F | 6' 0" (1.83 m) | 190 lb (86 kg) | 1998-11-14 | Karlstad, Sweden | Corpus Christi (NAHL) | — |
| 29 | (Canada) | Darwin Lakoduk | Freshman | F | 5' 10" (1.78 m) | 157 lb (71 kg) | 2000-01-28 | Edmonton, Alberta | Penticton Vees (BCHL) | — |
| 30 | (Canada) | Stefano Durante | Senior | G | 6' 0" (1.83 m) | 170 lb (77 kg) | 1996-06-04 | Brampton, Ontario | Cobourg (OJHL) | — |
| 33 | (United States) | Jarrett Fiske | Sophomore | G | 6' 4" (1.93 m) | 190 lb (86 kg) | 1999-05-28 | Erie, Pennsylvania | Kemptville (CCHL) | — |
| 34 | (United States) | Ryan McInchak | Freshman | G | 6' 0" (1.83 m) | 175 lb (79 kg) | 1999-02-28 | Trenton, Michigan | New Jersey (NAHL) | — |
| 39 | (Canada) | Justin Young | Senior | F | 6' 0" (1.83 m) | 172 lb (78 kg) | 1997-12-23 | Leduc, Alberta | Alaska (WCHA) | — |
| 44 | (United States) | Austen Long | Sophomore | F | 5' 11" (1.8 m) | 175 lb (79 kg) | 1998-02-15 | Minneapolis, Minnesota | Omaha (USHL) | — |
| 55 | (United States) | Chris Dodero (A) | Senior | F | 5' 9" (1.75 m) | 176 lb (80 kg) | 1996-06-08 | West Chicago, Illinois | Janesville (NAHL) | — |
| 61 | (United States) | Sam Miller | Freshman | D | 6' 0" (1.83 m) | 180 lb (82 kg) | 1999-08-03 | Milwaukee, Wisconsin | Shreveport (NAHL) | — |

† Egle left the program after playing one game.

== Standings ==
2020–21 Atlantic Hockey Standings
| | Conference record | | | | | | | | | | | Overall record | | | | | |
| | GP | W | L | T | OW | OL | SW | PTS | PT% | GF | GA | GP | W | L | T | GF | GA |
|---|---|---|---|---|---|---|---|---|---|---|---|---|---|---|---|---|---|
| #15 American International †* | 12 | 11 | 1 | 0 | 1 | 0 | 0 | 32 | .889 | 47 | 18 | 19 | 15 | 4 | 0 | 67 | 40 |
| Army | 15 | 10 | 4 | 1 | 3 | 1 | 1 | 30 | .667 | 42 | 33 | 22 | 15 | 6 | 1 | 71 | 48 |
| Robert Morris | 15 | 10 | 5 | 0 | 2 | 1 | 0 | 29 | .644 | 58 | 48 | 24 | 15 | 9 | 0 | 85 | 69 |
| Canisius | 13 | 8 | 5 | 0 | 1 | 1 | 0 | 24 | .615 | 42 | 34 | 17 | 11 | 6 | 0 | 59 | 46 |
| RIT | 13 | 7 | 5 | 1 | 0 | 0 | 1 | 23 | .590 | 43 | 40 | 20 | 9 | 9 | 2 | 68 | 70 |
| Sacred Heart | 13 | 6 | 6 | 1 | 1 | 2 | 0 | 20 | .513 | 35 | 38 | 18 | 6 | 10 | 2 | 43 | 59 |
| Mercyhurst | 16 | 7 | 8 | 1 | 1 | 1 | 1 | 23 | .479 | 54 | 50 | 21 | 8 | 12 | 1 | 64 | 67 |
| Bentley | 15 | 4 | 11 | 0 | 1 | 5 | 0 | 16 | .356 | 35 | 48 | 16 | 5 | 11 | 0 | 42 | 51 |
| Niagara | 15 | 3 | 9 | 3 | 0 | 2 | 1 | 15 | .333 | 39 | 53 | 22 | 7 | 12 | 3 | 57 | 70 |
| Air Force | 13 | 3 | 9 | 1 | 2 | 1 | 0 | 9 | .231 | 32 | 49 | 14 | 3 | 10 | 1 | 35 | 56 |
| Holy Cross | 12 | 3 | 9 | 0 | 2 | 0 | 0 | 7 | .194 | 22 | 38 | 16 | 4 | 12 | 0 | 30 | 52 |
Championship: March 20, 2021 † indicates conference regular season champion * indicates conference tournament champion (Riley Trophy); Rankings: USCHO.com Top 20 Poll

== Schedule and results ==
| Date | Time | Opponent^{#} | Rank^{#} | Site | TV | Decision | Result | Attendance | Record |
Regular season
| November 27 | 3:00 PM | vs. Air Force | | MassMutual Center • Springfield, Massachusetts | | Durante | W 3–1 | 0 | 1–0–0 (1–0–0) |
| November 28 | 3:00 PM | vs. Air Force | | MassMutual Center • Springfield, Massachusetts | | Durante | W 2–1 | 0 | 2–0–0 (2–0–0) |
| December 15 | 5:00 PM | vs. Army | | MassMutual Center • Springfield, Massachusetts | | Durante | W 4–1 | 0 | 3–0–0 (3–0–0) |
| December 18 | 5:05 PM | at Bentley | | Bentley Arena • Waltham, Massachusetts | | Durante | W 4–1 | 0 | 4–0–0 (4–0–0) |
| December 19 | 1:05 PM | vs. Bentley | | MassMutual Center • Springfield, Massachusetts | | Kucharski | W 3–1 | 0 | 5–0–0 (5–0–0) |
| December 26 | 7:00 PM | at #16 Quinnipiac* | #19 | People's United Center • Hamden, Connecticut | | Durante | L 3–8 | 0 | 5–1–0 |
| December 27 | 3:05 PM | vs. #16 Quinnipiac* | #19 | MassMutual Center • Springfield, Massachusetts | | Durante | L 2–3 | 0 | 5–2–0 |
| January 2 | 2:05 PM | vs. Long Island* | #20 | MassMutual Center • Springfield, Massachusetts | | Durante | W 2–1 | 0 | 6–2–0 |
| January 6 | 5:00 PM | at Army | #19 | Tate Rink • West Point, New York | | Durante | W 6–3 | 0 | 7–2–0 (6–0–0) |
| January 7 | 5:00 PM | at Army | #19 | Tate Rink • West Point, New York | | Kucharski | W 4–3 ^{OT} | 0 | 8–2–0 (7–0–0) |
| January 10 | 5:00 PM | vs. Army | #19 | MassMutual Center • Springfield, Massachusetts | | Durante | L 3–5 | 1 | 8–3–0 (7–1–0) |
| January 13 | 4:00 PM | vs. Long Island* | #20 | MassMutual Center • Springfield, Massachusetts | | Durante | W 5–2 | 0 | 9–3–0 |
| January 17 | 1:00 PM | vs. Holy Cross | #20 | MassMutual Center • Springfield, Massachusetts | | Kucharski | W 1–0 | 0 | 10–3–0 (8–1–0) |
| January 26 | 5:00 PM | vs. Sacred Heart | #19 | MassMutual Center • Springfield, Massachusetts | | Kucharski | W 8–2 | 0 | 11–3–0 (9–1–0) |
| January 29 | 5:00 PM | at Holy Cross | #19 | Hart Center • Worcester, Massachusetts | | Kucharski | W 6–0 | 0 | 12–3–0 (10–1–0) |
| January 30 | 2:00 PM | vs. Holy Cross | #19 | MassMutual Center • Springfield, Massachusetts | | McInchak | W 3–0 | 0 | 13–3–0 (11–1–0) |
Atlantic Hockey Tournament
| March 19 | 2:00 PM | vs. Army* | #15 | MassMutual Center • Springfield, Massachusetts (Atlantic Hockey Semifinals) | | Durante | W 2–1 | 0 | 14–3–0 |
| March 20 | 7:00 PM | vs. Canisius* | #15 | MassMutual Center • Springfield, Massachusetts (Atlantic Hockey Championship) | | Durante | W 5–2 | 0 | 15–3–0 |
NCAA Tournament
| March 26 | 9:30 PM | vs. #1 North Dakota* | #15 | Scheels Arena • Fargo, North Dakota (Midwest Regional semifinals) | ESPN3 | Durante | L 1–5 | 1,435 | 15–4–0 |
*Non-conference game. ^{#}Rankings from USCHO.com Poll. All times are in Eastern Time.

== Scoring statistics ==
| Name | Position | Games | Goals | Assists | Points | PIM |
|---|---|---|---|---|---|---|
| Chris Theodore | LW | 19 | 4 | 15 | 19 | 2 |
| Tobias Fladeby | LW/RW | 16 | 10 | 8 | 18 | 0 |
| Chris Dodero | C/LW | 19 | 7 | 11 | 18 | 16 |
| Brennan Kapcheck | D | 19 | 0 | 18 | 18 | 10 |
| Justin Cole | F | 18 | 9 | 7 | 16 | 0 |
| Elijiah Barriga | LW | 16 | 7 | 6 | 13 | 6 |
| Zak Galambos | D | 16 | 4 | 6 | 10 | 16 |
| Aaron Grounds | F | 18 | 5 | 3 | 8 | 10 |
| Julius Janhonen | C | 16 | 3 | 5 | 8 | 4 |
| Eric Otto | F | 15 | 2 | 5 | 7 | 8 |
| Michal Stinil | LW | 17 | 2 | 5 | 7 | 31 |
| Parker Revering | D | 19 | 0 | 7 | 7 | 14 |
| Brett Callahan | D | 15 | 1 | 5 | 6 | 2 |
| Nico Somerville | D | 16 | 2 | 3 | 5 | 6 |
| Justin Young | C | 6 | 2 | 2 | 4 | 6 |
| Jeff Baum | D/F | 16 | 0 | 4 | 4 | 6 |
| Jake Stella | LW | 17 | 0 | 4 | 4 | 2 |
| Blake Bennett | F | 5 | 2 | 1 | 3 | 2 |
| Luka Maver | C | 14 | 2 | 1 | 3 | 17 |
| Jan Kern | LW | 16 | 1 | 2 | 3 | 10 |
| Hunter Johannes | F | 8 | 0 | 3 | 3 | 6 |
| Darwin Lakoduk | F | 1 | 1 | 0 | 1 | 0 |
| Sam Miller | D | 4 | 1 | 0 | 1 | 2 |
| Kyle Jeffers | F | 6 | 1 | 0 | 1 | 2 |
| Austen Long | RW | 15 | 1 | 0 | 1 | 4 |
| Matúš Spodniak | F | 1 | 0 | 0 | 0 | 0 |
| Jarrett Fiske | G | 1 | 0 | 0 | 0 | 0 |
| Adam Stacho | RW | 1 | 0 | 0 | 0 | 0 |
| Verners Egle | W | 1 | 0 | 0 | 0 | 0 |
| Oskar Strömberg | D | 2 | 0 | 0 | 0 | 0 |
| Ryan McInchak | G | 2 | 0 | 0 | 0 | 0 |
| Jake Kucharski | G | 7 | 0 | 0 | 0 | 0 |
| Matt Rickard | D | 9 | 0 | 0 | 0 | 4 |
| Stefano Durante | G | 13 | 0 | 0 | 0 | 0 |
| Bench | - | - | - | - | - | 12 |
| Total | | | 67 | 121 | 188 | 198 |

== Goaltending statistics ==
| Name | Games | Minutes | Wins | Losses | Ties | Goals against | Saves | Shut outs | SV % | GAA |
|---|---|---|---|---|---|---|---|---|---|---|
| Ryan McInchak | 2 | 99 | 1 | 0 | 0 | 0 | 37 | 1 | 1.000 | 0.00 |
| Jake Kucharski | 7 | 319 | 5 | 0 | 0 | 9 | 98 | 1 | .916 | 1.69 |
| Stefano Durante | 13 | 710 | 9 | 4 | 0 | 29 | 252 | 0 | .897 | 2.45 |
| Jarrett Fiske | 1 | 5:07 | 0 | 0 | 0 | 2 | 5 | 0 | .714 | 23.45 |
| Empty Net | - | 8 | - | - | - | 0 | - | - | - | - |
| Total | 19 | 1142 | 15 | 4 | 0 | 40 | 392 | 3 ^{†} | .907 | 2.10 |

† Kucharski and McInchak split a shutout on January 29.

== Rankings ==
| Poll | Week | | | | | | | | | | | | | | | | | | | | | |
| Poll | Pre | 1 | 2 | 3 | 4 | 5 | 6 | 7 | 8 | 9 | 10 | 11 | 12 | 13 | 14 | 15 | 16 | 17 | 18 | 19 | 20 | 21 (Final) |
|---|---|---|---|---|---|---|---|---|---|---|---|---|---|---|---|---|---|---|---|---|---|---|
| USCHO.com | NR | NR | NR | NR | NR | NR | 19 | 20 | 19 | 20 | 20 | 19 | 17 | 15 | 16 | 16 | 16 | 16 | 15 | 15 | - | 15 |
| USA Today | NR | NR | NR | NR | NR | NR | NR | NR | NR | NR | NR | NR | NR | 14 | 15 | 15 | 15 | 15 | 15 | 14 | 15 | 15 |

USCHO did not release a poll in week 20.

== Awards and honors ==
| Player | Award | Ref |
|---|---|---|
| Brennan Kapcheck | AHCA East First Team All-American | |
| Brennan Kapcheck | Atlantic Hockey Player of the Year | |
| Chris Dodero | Atlantic Hockey Best Defensive Forward | |
| Brennan Kapcheck | Atlantic Hockey Best Defenseman | |
| Justin Cole | Atlantic Hockey Individual Sportsmanship Award | |
| Justin Cole | Atlantic Hockey Most Valuable Player in Tournament | |
| Brennan Kapcheck | Atlantic Hockey First Team | |
| Tobias Fladeby | Atlantic Hockey First Team | |
| Stefano Durante | Atlantic Hockey Second Team | |
| Elijah Barriga | Atlantic Hockey Second Team | |
| Chris Dodero | Atlantic Hockey Second Team | |
| Nico Somerville | Atlantic Hockey Rookie Team | |
| Aaron Grounds | Atlantic Hockey Rookie Team | |
| Eric Otto | Atlantic Hockey Rookie Team | |
| Stefano Durante | Atlantic Hockey All-Tournament Team | |
| Brennan Kapcheck | Atlantic Hockey All-Tournament Team | |
| Elijah Barriga | Atlantic Hockey All-Tournament Team | |
| Justin Cole | Atlantic Hockey All-Tournament Team | |
