= Nikita Nesterenko =

American ice hockey player (born 2001)

- Born: September 10, 2001 (age 25) Brooklyn, New York, U.S.
- Height: 6 ft 2 in (188 cm)
- Weight: 183 lb (83 kg; 13 st 1 lb)
- Position: Center
- Shoots: Left
- NHL team: Anaheim Ducks
- NHL draft: 172nd overall, 2019; Minnesota Wild
- Playing career: 2023–present

Nikita Nesterenko (born September 10, 2001) is an American professional ice hockey player who is a center for the Anaheim Ducks in the National Hockey League (NHL). He was selected by the Minnesota Wild with the 17th pick in the sixth round, 172nd selection overall, of the 2019 NHL entry draft.

== Early life ==
Born in Brooklyn, New York, the son of immigrants from Russia, he was raised in Coney Island.

== Playing career ==
=== Amateur ===
He played prep hockey for the Lawrenceville School, graduating in 2020. He played for the Chilliwack Chiefs of the British Columbia Hockey League before joining the collegiate Boston College Eagles team. For the 2020–21 season, Nesterenko was selected along with Josh Lopina as the Hockey East rookie of the year. He was also named to Hockey East's All-Rookie Team for 2020–21. During his junior season with the Eagles in 2022–23, he established a career best 13 goals and 34 points through 36 games.

=== Professional ===
Nesterenko was selected by the Minnesota Wild of the National Hockey League (NHL) with the 17th pick in the sixth round, 172nd selection overall, of the 2019 NHL entry draft. The Anaheim Ducks obtained Nesterenko's signing rights, defenseman Andrej Sustr and a fourth-round draft pick in 2025 in exchange for defenseman John Klingberg on March 3, 2023. Nesterenko ended his collegiate career by agreeing to a two-year, entry-level contract on March 16, 2023.

Immediately joining the rebuilding Ducks for the remainder of the 2022–23 season, Nesterenko made his NHL debut on March 21, 2023, against the Calgary Flames. He scored his first NHL goal in his third game, a 6–3 loss to the St. Louis Blues, on March 25, on a pass from Mason McTavish. He spent the majority of the 2023–24 season with Anaheim's American Hockey League (AHL) affiliate, the San Diego Gulls, appearing in 70 games, scoring 16 goals and 37 points. He was recalled on April 5, 2024 and appeared in three games with Anaheim, scoring one goal, again against St. Louis. He was returned to San Diego on April 10.

A restricted free agent, he received a qualifying offer from the Ducks at the end of the 2023–24 season. On July 15, 2024, Nesterenko signed a one-year, two-way contract with Anaheim. Nesterenko was assigned to San Diego to start the 2024–25 season. He was recalled by the Ducks on January 1, 2025 and made his NHL season debut on January 5 against the Tampa Bay Lightning, replacing Ross Johnston in the lineup. The Ducks went on to win the game 4–1. He scored his first goal of the NHL season on January 9, tallying one in a 6–2 loss to the St. Louis Blues. He was returned to San Diego on January 24 after appearing in seven games with Anaheim, recording the one goal and two points.

On June 18, 2025, Nesterenko signed a two-year, $1.575 million contract extension with the Ducks.

== Career statistics ==
			Regular season					Playoffs
Season	Team	League	GP	G	A	Pts	PIM	GP	G	A	Pts	PIM
2016–17	Lawrenceville School	USHS	29	4	10	14	—	—	—	—	—	—
2017–18	Lawrenceville School	USHS	26	7	6	13	—	—	—	—	—	—
2018–19	Lawrenceville School	USHS	31	30	29	59	—	—	—	—	—	—
2019–20	Chilliwack Chiefs	BCHL	56	20	36	56	29	7	0	2	2	6
2020–21	Boston College	HE	24	8	11	19	18	—	—	—	—	—
2021–22	Boston College	HE	37	7	17	24	50	—	—	—	—	—
2022–23	Boston College	HE	36	13	21	34	18	—	—	—	—	—
2022–23	Anaheim Ducks	NHL	9	1	0	1	0	—	—	—	—	—
2023–24	San Diego Gulls	AHL	70	16	21	37	38	—	—	—	—	—
2023–24	Anaheim Ducks	NHL	3	1	2	3	0	—	—	—	—	—
2024–25	San Diego Gulls	AHL	50	13	21	34	36	—	—	—	—	—
2024–25	Anaheim Ducks	NHL	20	4	2	6	2	—	—	—	—	—
2025–26	Anaheim Ducks	NHL	29	1	8	9	8	—	—	—	—	—
2025–26	San Diego Gulls	AHL	35	5	10	15	22	2	0	0	0	0
NHL totals			61	7	10	17	10	—	—	—	—	—

== Awards and honors ==
Award	Year
USHS
All-USA Hockey Third Team	2019
College
HE All-Rookie Team	2021
HE Rookie of the Year	2021
