= Matt Boldy =

American ice hockey player (born 2001)

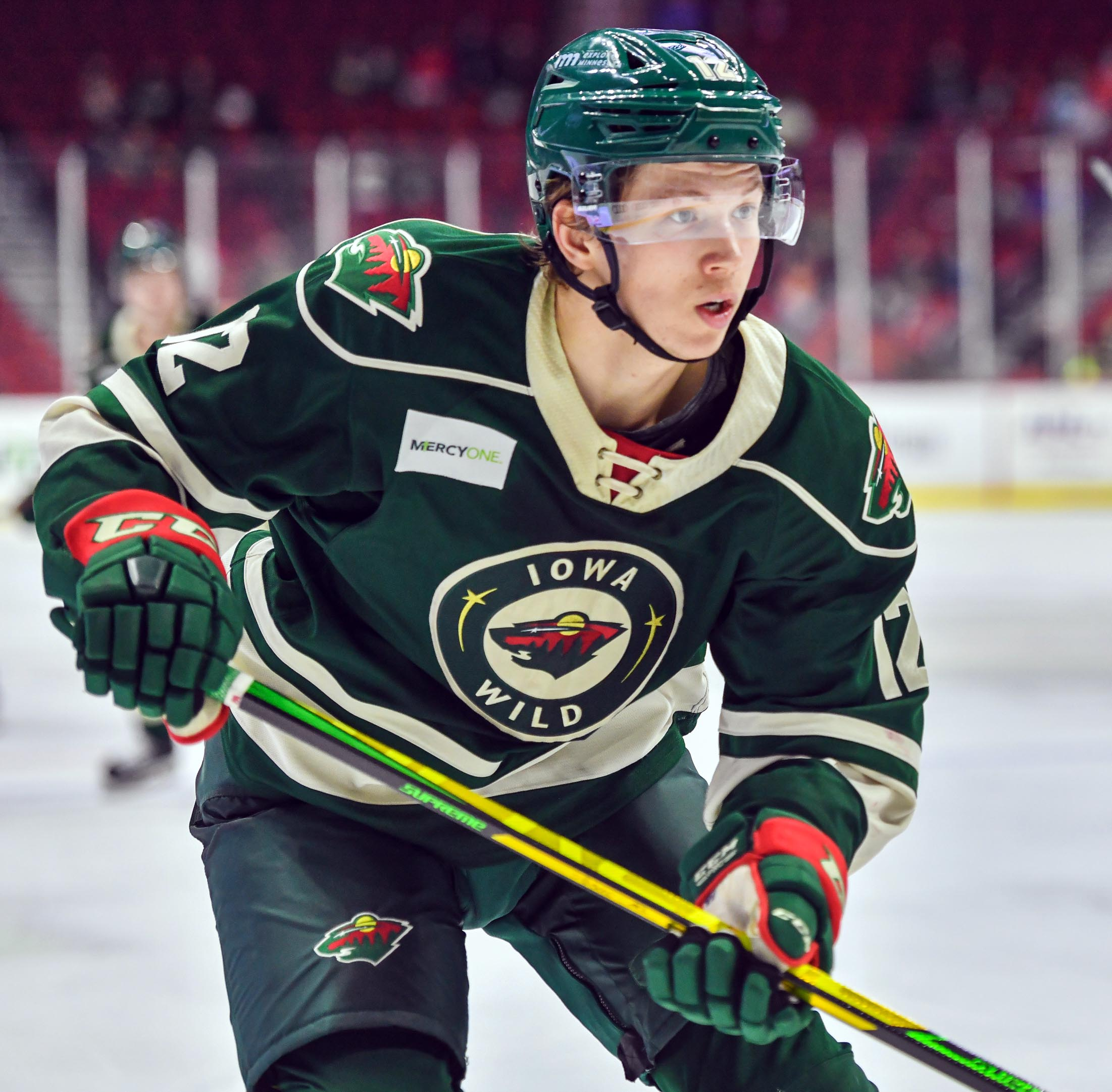
- Boldy with the Iowa Wild
- Born: April 5, 2001 (age 25) Milford, Massachusetts, U.S.
- Height: 6 ft 2 in (188 cm)
- Weight: 201 lb (91 kg; 14 st 5 lb)
- Position: Forward
- Shoots: Left
- NHL team: Minnesota Wild
- National team: United States
- NHL draft: 12th overall, 2019; Minnesota Wild
- Playing career: 2021–present

Matthew Edward Boldy (born April 5, 2001) is an American professional ice hockey player who is a forward for the Minnesota Wild of the National Hockey League (NHL). He was drafted 12th overall by the Wild in the first round of the 2019 NHL entry draft.

== Early life ==
Boldy was born on April 5, 2001, to parents Todd Boldy and Jennifer Gruttadauria. He was born in Milford, Massachusetts, but his family moved to Millis, Massachusetts when Boldy was in the fourth grade. His father, Todd, was a football player at the University of Maine and currently serves as a member of the Attleboro Police Department. His mom Jennifer is a bartender and manager at a restaurant in Mansfield, Massachusetts.

Growing up, Todd encouraged Matthew and his brother to play hockey instead of football due to limited options in Millis. Boldy attended and skated for Medway High School before enrolling in the Dexter Southfield School before attending Northville High School alongside Team USA teammate Henry Thrun. In his first year at Dexter, Boldy accumulated 13 goals and 13 assists in 29 games under coach Dan Donato. As a result, he was invited to try out for the USA Hockey National Team Development Program (USNTDP) in the United States Hockey League (USHL).

== Playing career ==
Boldy joined the USA Hockey National Team Development Program for the 2017–18 USHL season and led the team with 11 goals and four shorthanded goals in 13 games as a rookie. In his first year of draft eligibility, Boldy received an A rating on NHL Central Scouting Bureau's preliminary players to watch list. He returned to the USNTDP for their 2018–19 season and recorded 33 goals and 48 assists for 81 points in 64 games. Upon signing his letter of intent at Boston College for the 2019–20 season, Boldy said "playing at BC was always a dream of mine...when I got the chance it was hard to pass up. I grew up going to their games and being around there. When I got the chance it was a pretty easy choice for me."

During the 2019 NHL entry draft, Boldy was selected 12th overall by the Minnesota Wild.

=== Collegiate ===
In his sophomore season with Boston College, he led the Eagles in scoring with 11 goals, 20 assists and 31 points in 22 games of the shortened 2020–21 season. Boldy was named a Hobey Baker Award Top Ten Finalist before opting to end his collegiate career. On March 31, 2021, Boldy was signed to a three-year, entry-level contract with the Wild and was assigned to their American Hockey League (AHL) affiliate, the Iowa Wild, for the remainder of the season.

=== Professional ===
On January 6, 2022, Boldy made his NHL debut, scoring the game-winning goal against the Boston Bruins in the Wild's 3–2 win. On February 14, 2022, Boldy earned his first NHL hat trick against the Detroit Red Wings in the Minnesota Wild's 7–4 win. He finished his first season with the Wild with 15 goals and 24 assists in 47 games.

On January 16, 2023, the Wild signed Boldy to a seven-year, $49 million contract extension. At the end of the 2024–25 season Boldy was named as a top-10 NHL forward by NHL.com and posted a season best of 27 goals, 46 assists and overall 73 points slightly higher then the previous 2023–24 season with 29 goals, 40 assists and 69 overall points. During the 2025–26 season Boldy was ranked fourth in the NHL for goals with 27 and fifteenth in shots on goal with 157 by January 2026. Boldy had recorded his fifth overall four-point game by the end of February 2026 after the 2026 Winter Olympics, tying the record of Mats Zuccarello for the second most in Wild history. He also became the first player in franchise history to record consecutive four point games.

== International play ==
Medal record

Men's ice hockey

Representing the United States

Winter Olympics
Gold medal – first place	2026 Milano Cortina	

4 Nations Face-Off
Runner-up	2025 Canada/United States	

World Junior Championship
Gold medal – first place	2021 Canada	

IIHF World U18 Championship
Bronze medal – third place	2019 Sweden	

Internationally, Boldy represents the United States. Boldy represented Team USA at the 4 Nations Face-Off in 2024.

In August 2025, it was announced that Boldy was named as part of 44 players who would attend the Olympic Orientation Camp leading up to the 2026 Winter Olympics. On January 2, 2026, he was named to Team USA's roster for the 2026 Winter Olympics. Boldy scored the opening goal of the gold medal match against Canada, which the United States won 2–1 in overtime. Speaking later after the game, Boldy recounted that his first priority was to get the puck to Quinn Hughes, and that it was a normal standard and praising Hughes ability to create plays and shots.

Amid online backlash faced by the men's Olympic hockey team regarding the inclusion of FBI director Kash Patel during their gold medal celebrations and members of the team laughing at President Trump's comments of being impeached if he did not invite the women's team to the White House, Boldy was among the majority who visited with the president and attended the State of the Union.

== Career statistics ==
=== Regular season and playoffs ===
			Regular season					Playoffs
Season	Team	League	GP	G	A	Pts	PIM	GP	G	A	Pts	PIM
2016–17	Dexter School	USHS	29	13	13	26	8	—	—	—	—	—
2017–18	US NTDP Juniors	USHL	34	12	23	35	14	8	4	4	8	8
2017–18	US NTDP U17	USDP	61	29	47	76	30	—	—	—	—	—
2017–18	US NTDP U18	USDP	1	0	0	0	0	—	—	—	—	—
2018–19	US NTDP Juniors	USHL	28	17	26	43	16	—	—	—	—	—
2018–19	US NTDP U18	USDP	64	33	48	81	28	—	—	—	—	—
2019–20	Boston College	HE	34	9	17	26	8	—	—	—	—	—
2020–21	Boston College	HE	22	11	20	31	4	—	—	—	—	—
2020–21	Iowa Wild	AHL	14	6	12	18	2	—	—	—	—	—
2021–22	Iowa Wild	AHL	10	4	6	10	6	—	—	—	—	—
2021–22	Minnesota Wild	NHL	47	15	24	39	10	6	1	0	1	4
2022–23	Minnesota Wild	NHL	81	31	32	63	39	6	0	3	3	4
2023–24	Minnesota Wild	NHL	75	29	40	69	48	—	—	—	—	—
2024–25	Minnesota Wild	NHL	82	27	46	73	51	6	5	2	7	2
2025–26	Minnesota Wild	NHL	76	42	43	85	30	11	7	6	13	4
NHL totals			361	144	185	329	178	29	13	11	24	14

=== International ===
Year	Team	Event	Result	GP	G	A	Pts	PIM
2017	United States	U17	1st place, gold medalist(s)	6	3	6	9	2
2019	United States	WJC18	3rd place, bronze medalist(s)	7	3	9	12	0
2021	United States	WJC	1st place, gold medalist(s)	7	5	2	7	2
2022	United States	WC	4th	5	1	2	3	2
2024	United States	WC	5th	8	6	8	14	2
2025	United States	4NF	2nd	4	1	2	3	2
2026	United States	OG	1st place, gold medalist(s)	6	2	2	4	2
Junior totals				20	11	17	28	4
Senior totals				23	10	14	24	8

== Awards and honors ==
Award	Year
College
Hockey East All-Rookie Team	2020
All-Hockey East First Team	2021
AHCA East First Team All-American	2021

Awards and achievements
Preceded by Filip Johansson	Minnesota Wild first-round draft pick 2019	Succeeded by Marco Rossi
