= 2020–21 NCAA Division I men's ice hockey rankings =

- NCAA tournament: 2021
- NCAA champion: Massachusetts
- Preseason No. 1 (USA Today): North Dakota
- Preseason No. 1 (USCHO): North Dakota
- NCAA Division I men's ice hockey rankings

Two human polls made up the 2020–21 NCAA Division I men's ice hockey rankings, the USCHO.com/CBS College Sports poll and the USA Today/USA Hockey Magazine poll. As the 2020–21 season progressed, rankings were updated weekly.

== Legend ==
	Increase in ranking
	Decrease in ranking
	Not ranked previous week
Italics	Number of first place votes
(#-#)	Win–loss–tie record
т	Tied with team above or below also with this symbol

== USCHO ==
	Preseason Oct 26	Week 1 Nov 16	Week 2 Nov 23	Week 3 Nov 30	Week 4 Dec 7	Week 5 Dec 14	Week 6 Dec 21	Week 7 Dec 28	Week 8 Jan 4	Week 9 Jan 11	Week 10 Jan 18	Week 11 Jan 25	Week 12 Feb 1	Week 13 Feb 8	Week 14 Feb 15	Week 15 Feb 22	Week 16 Mar 1	Week 17 Mar 8	Week 18 Mar 15	Week 19 Mar 22	Final Apr 12	
1.	North Dakota (28)	North Dakota (0–0–0) (39)	North Dakota (0–0–0) (30)	North Dakota (0–0–0) (22)	North Dakota (3–0–0) (27)	Minnesota (8–0–0) (34)	Minnesota (8–0–0) (35)	Minnesota (8–0–0) (36)	Minnesota (9–0–0) (39)	Minnesota (11–1–0) (31)	Boston College (8–2–0) (34)	Boston College (9–2–1) (19)	Boston College (9–2–1) (28)	Boston College (11–3–1) (23)	Boston College (13–3–1) (29)	Boston College (15–3–1) (27)	North Dakota (18–4–1) (37)	Boston College (16–4–1) (23)	Boston College (17–4–1) (24)	North Dakota (21–5–1) (36)	Massachusetts (20–5–4) (40)	1.
2.	Boston College (4)	Boston College (0–0–0) (4)	Boston College (0–0–0) (3)	Boston College (2–0–0) (16)	Boston College (4–0–0) (13)	Boston College (5–1–0) (3)	Boston College (5–1–0) (4)	Boston College (5–1–0) (4)	Boston College (5–1–0) (1)	North Dakota (8–2–1) (8)	Minnesota State (7–1–1) (3)	North Dakota (12–3–1) (9)	Minnesota (15–3–0) (11)	North Dakota (13–4–1) (10)	North Dakota (15–4–1) (8)	North Dakota (17–4–1) (12)	Boston College (15–4–1) (3)	North Dakota (18–5–1) (12)	North Dakota (19–5–1) (14)	Boston College (17–5–1) (3) т	St. Cloud State (20–11–0)	2.
3.	Minnesota–Duluth (3)	Minnesota–Duluth (0–0–0) (1)	Minnesota–Duluth (0–0–0)	Minnesota–Duluth (0–0–0)	Minnesota–Duluth (3–0–0)	Minnesota–Duluth (5–1–1) (1)	North Dakota (7–2–1) (1)	North Dakota (7–2–1)	North Dakota (7–2–1)	Boston College (6–2–0)	North Dakota (9–3–1) (1)	Minnesota State (9–1–1) (10)	North Dakota (13–4–1) (1)	Minnesota State (11–2–1) (5)	Minnesota State (13–2–1) (3)	Minnesota State (15–2–1) (1)	Minnesota (19–5–0)	Minnesota State (18–3–1) (5)	Minnesota State (20–3–1) (2)	Minnesota (23–6–0) (1) т	Minnesota–Duluth (15–11–2)	3.
4.	Minnesota State (1)	Denver (0–0–0)	Michigan (4–0–0) (6)	Denver (0–0–0)	Minnesota (6–0–0)	North Dakota (4–2–1) (2)	Minnesota–Duluth (5–2–2)	Minnesota–Duluth (5–2–2)	Minnesota State (5–1–1)	St. Cloud State (9–4–0) (1)	Minnesota (11–3–0) (2)	Minnesota (13–3–0) (2)	St. Cloud State (11–6–0)	Minnesota–Duluth (12–5–2) (2)	Minnesota (17–5–0)	Minnesota (19–5–0)	Minnesota State (16–3–1)	Minnesota (20–6–0)	Minnesota (21–6–0)	Wisconsin (20–9–1)	Minnesota State (22–5–1)	4.
5.	Denver	Minnesota State (0–0–0) (1)	Denver (0–0–0)	Minnesota (4–0–0) (1)	Michigan (5–3–0)	Minnesota State (2–1–0)	Minnesota State (3–1–1)	Minnesota State (3–1–1)	Minnesota–Duluth (6–3–2)	Minnesota State (5–1–1)	Bowling Green (14–2–0)	St. Cloud State (11–6–0)	Minnesota–Duluth (10–5–2)	Minnesota (15–5–0)	Wisconsin (14–8–0)	Wisconsin (15–8–1)	Wisconsin (17–8–1)	Wisconsin (19–8–1)	Wisconsin (19–8–1)	Minnesota State (20–4–1)	North Dakota (22–6–1)	5.
6.	Cornell (4)	Michigan (2–0–0) (1)	Minnesota State (1–0–0) (1)	Minnesota State (1–0–0) (1)	Minnesota State (1–1–0)	Michigan (5–5–0)	St. Cloud State (6–3–0)	St. Cloud State (6–3–0)	St. Cloud State (7–4–0)	Massachusetts (9–3–1)	St. Cloud State (9–6–0)	Minnesota–Duluth (8–5–2)	Minnesota State (9–2–1)	St. Cloud State (12–7–0)	St. Cloud State (13–8–0)	St. Cloud State (14–8–0)	Massachusetts (13–5–3)	Michigan (14–9–1)	Massachusetts (14–5–4)	Massachusetts (16–5–4)	Boston College (17–6–1)	6.
7.	Massachusetts	Massachusetts (0–0–0)	Massachusetts (1–0–1)	Michigan (4–2–0)	Clarkson (2–1–0)	Clarkson (4–2–0)	Michigan (5–5–0)	Bowling Green (8–1–0)	Bowling Green (11–1–0)	Minnesota–Duluth (6–5–2)	Minnesota–Duluth (6–5–2)	Michigan (10–6–0)	Michigan (10–6–0)	Wisconsin (13–7–0)	Michigan (11–7–0)	Michigan (12–8–0)	Michigan (13–8–1)	Massachusetts (13–5–4)	Michigan (15–9–1)	St. Cloud State (17–10–0)	Minnesota (24–7–0)	7.
8.	Clarkson	Clarkson (0–0–0)	Minnesota (2–0–0)	Massachusetts (1–2–1)	UMass Lowell (0–0–0)	Denver (2–4–0)	Clarkson (4–2–0)	Michigan (5–5–0)	Massachusetts (8–3–1)	Bowling Green (12–2–0)	Michigan (8–6–0)	Bowling Green (14–4–0)	Bowling Green (16–4–0)	Michigan (10–6–0)	Minnesota–Duluth (12–7–2)	Boston University (9–2–0)	St. Cloud State (14–9–0)	St. Cloud State (15–9–0)	St. Cloud State (16–9–0)	Michigan (15–10–1)	Wisconsin (20–10–1)	8.
9.	Penn State	Ohio State (0–0–0)	Clarkson (1–0–0)	Clarkson (2–1–0)	Denver (0–3–0)	St. Cloud State (4–2–0)	Bowling Green (8–1–0)	Massachusetts (5–3–1)	Michigan (5–5–0)	Michigan (6–6–0)	Massachusetts (9–4–1)	Omaha (9–4–1)	Omaha (10–5–1)	Massachusetts (11–5–3)	Omaha (13–6–1)	Massachusetts (11–5–3)	Minnesota–Duluth (13–8–2)	Boston University (10–3–1) т	Minnesota–Duluth (14–9–2)	Minnesota–Duluth (14–10–2)	Michigan (15–10–1)	9.
10.	Ohio State	Penn State (0–0–0)	Ohio State (0–0–0)	UMass Lowell (0–0–0)	Massachusetts (2–3–1)	Massachusetts (2–3–1)	Massachusetts (4–3–1)	Clarkson (4–3–0)	Clarkson (6–3–1)	Omaha (6–3–1)	Quinnipiac (10–4–1)	Massachusetts (9–5–3)	Massachusetts (11–5–3)	Omaha (11–6–1)	Massachusetts (11–5–3)	Minnesota–Duluth (12–8–2)	Boston University (10–3–0)	Minnesota–Duluth (13–9–2) т	Quinnipiac (17–6–4)	Boston University (10–4–1)	Bemidji State (16–10–3)	10.
11.	UMass Lowell	Minnesota (0–0–0)	UMass Lowell (0–0–0)	Quinnipiac (0–0–0)	Quinnipiac (0–0–0)	Quinnipiac (0–0–0)	Omaha (5–3–1)	Omaha (6–3–1)	Omaha (6–3–1)	Quinnipiac (8–4–1)	Omaha (6–3–1)	Quinnipiac (10–5–3)	Wisconsin (11–7–0)	Quinnipiac (12–5–3)	Boston University (8–2–0)	Omaha (13–8–1)	Quinnipiac (16–5–4)	Omaha (14–9–1)	Boston University (10–4–1)	Quinnipiac (17–7–4)	Boston University (10–5–1)	11.
12.	Michigan	UMass Lowell (0–0–0)	Quinnipiac (0–0–0)	Providence (0–0–0)	Wisconsin (5–5–0)	Northeastern (2–0–0)	Northeastern (2–1–1)	Quinnipiac (6–2–0)	Wisconsin (5–5–0)	Wisconsin (6–6–0)	Wisconsin (8–6–0)	Clarkson (9–6–3)	Quinnipiac (10–5–3)	Bowling Green (16–6–0)	Quinnipiac (13–5–4)	Quinnipiac (13–5–4)	Omaha (13–9–1)	Quinnipiac (17–6–4)	Omaha (14–10–1)	Omaha (14–10–1)	Quinnipiac (17–8–4)	12.
13.	Quinnipiac	Quinnipiac (0–0–0)	Providence (0–0–0)	Ohio State (1–3–0)	St. Cloud State (3–0–0)	Bowling Green (6–1–0)	Wisconsin (5–5–0)	Northeastern (3–1–2)	Quinnipiac (6–3–1)	Clarkson (7–5–1)	Northeastern (6–3–2)	Wisconsin (9–7–0)	Clarkson (9–6–3)	Boston University (6–2–0)	Clarkson (9–7–4)	Bowling Green (17–8–1)	Bowling Green (19–8–1)	Bowling Green (19–8–1)	Bemidji State (15–8–3)	Lake Superior State (19–6–3)	Omaha (14–11–1)	13.
14.	Minnesota	Wisconsin (2–0–0)	Wisconsin (2–2–0)	Wisconsin (4–4–0)	Ohio State (2–4–0)	Wisconsin (5–5–0)	Denver (3–6–1)	Wisconsin (5–5–0)	Northeastern (3–3–2)	Northeastern (5–3–2)	Clarkson (8–6–1)	Northeastern (6–3–2)	Northeastern (6–3–2)	Clarkson (9–7–4)	Bowling Green (16–8–0)	Providence (9–6–4)	Clarkson (11–7–4)	Clarkson (11–7–4)	Providence (11–8–5)	Bemidji State (15–9–3)	Lake Superior State (19–7–3)	14.
15.	Arizona State	Providence (0–0–0)	Penn State (0–2–0)	Northeastern (0–0–0)	Notre Dame (3–3–0)	UMass Lowell (0–1–0)	Providence (2–2–1)	Providence (2–2–1)	UMass Lowell (2–1–0)	UMass Lowell (3–1–0)	UMass Lowell (3–1–0)	Boston University (5–1–0)	Boston University (5–1–0)	AIC (13–3–0)	Providence (9–6–4)	Clarkson (9–7–4)	Providence (10–7–4)	Bemidji State (13–8–3)	AIC (13–3–0)	AIC (15–3–0)	AIC (15–4–0)	15.
16.	Bemidji State	Bemidji State (0–0–0)	Northeastern (0–0–0)	Notre Dame (2–2–0)	Bowling Green (4–1–0)	Notre Dame (4–4–0)	Quinnipiac (2–2–0)	Denver (3–6–1)	Providence (3–3–2)	Providence (4–4–2)	Notre Dame (7–6–1)	UMass Lowell (3–1–0)	Providence (7–5–4)	Providence (8–6–4)	AIC (13–3–0) т	AIC (13–3–0)	AIC (13–3–0)	AIC (13–3–0)	Bowling Green (20–10–1)	Providence (11–9–5)	Providence (11–9–5)	16.
17.	Providence	Western Michigan (0–0–0)	Western Michigan (0–0–0)	Western Michigan (0–0–0)	Northeastern (0–0–0)	Omaha (4–3–0)	UMass Lowell (0–1–0)	UMass Lowell (1–1–0)	Denver (4–7–1)	Robert Morris (11–3–0)	Robert Morris (11–3–0)	Providence (5–5–4)	AIC (13–3–0)	Bemidji State (7–4–3)	Northeastern (8–5–2) т	Northeastern (9–6–2)	Bemidji State (10–7–3)	Providence (10–8–5)	Lake Superior State (17–6–3)	Bowling Green (20–10–1)	Notre Dame (14–13–2)	17.
18.	Western Michigan	Northeastern (0–0–0)	Bowling Green (2–0–0)	Bowling Green (2–0–0)	Omaha (2–2–0)	Ohio State (3–5–0)	Notre Dame (4–5–1)	Notre Dame (4–5–1)	Notre Dame (4–5–1)	Denver (4–7–1)	Providence (5–5–2)	Michigan Tech (7–3–1)	Bemidji State (6–4–2)	Northeastern (6–5–2)	Michigan Tech (14–5–1)	Lake Superior State (12–4–3)	Northeastern (9–7–3)	Lake Superior State (15–6–3)	Clarkson (11–7–4)	Notre Dame (14–13–2)	Bowling Green (20–10–1)	18.
19.	Northeastern	Bowling Green (1–0–0)	Bemidji State (0–1–0)	Bemidji State (0–1–0)	Providence (0–2–0)	Providence (1–2–0)	AIC (5–0–0)	Lake Superior State (4–0–2)	AIC (6–2–0)	Lake Superior State (6–1–3)	Denver (5–7–1)	AIC (10–3–0)	Robert Morris (12–5–0)	Robert Morris (14–5–0)	Robert Morris (14–5–0)	Bemidji State (9–6–3)	Michigan Tech (17–8–1)	Notre Dame (14–12–2)	Army (15–5–1)	UMass Lowell (10–9–1)	UMass Lowell (10–9–1)	19.
20.	Notre Dame	Boston University (0–0–0)	Boston University (0–0–0)	Arizona State (2–3–1)	Arizona State (3–4–1)	Robert Morris (5–2–0)	Lake Superior State (4–0–2)	AIC (5–1–0)	Robert Morris (8–3–0)	AIC (8–3–0)	AIC (10–3–0)	Denver (6–9–1)	UMass Lowell (3–3–0)	Connecticut (8–6–2)	Lake Superior State (9–4–3)	Michigan Tech (14–8–1)	Lake Superior State (13–5–3)	Northeastern (9–8–3)	Notre Dame (14–13–2)	Clarkson (11–7–4)	Clarkson (11–7–4)	20.
	Preseason Oct 26	Week 1 Nov 16	Week 2 Nov 23	Week 3 Nov 30	Week 4 Dec 7	Week 5 Dec 14	Week 6 Dec 21	Week 7 Dec 28	Week 8 Jan 4	Week 9 Jan 11	Week 10 Jan 18	Week 11 Jan 25	Week 12 Feb 1	Week 13 Feb 8	Week 14 Feb 15	Week 15 Feb 22	Week 16 Mar 1	Week 17 Mar 8	Week 18 Mar 15	Week 19 Mar 22	Final Apr 12	
		Dropped: Cornell; Arizona State; Notre Dame	None	Dropped: Penn State; Boston University	Dropped: Western Michigan; Bemidji State	Dropped: Arizona State	Dropped: Ohio State; Robert Morris	None	Dropped: Lake Superior State	Dropped: Notre Dame	Dropped: Lake Superior State	Dropped: Notre Dame; Robert Morris	Dropped: Michigan Tech; Denver	Dropped: UMass Lowell	Dropped: Bemidji State; Connecticut	Dropped: Robert Morris	None	Dropped: Michigan Tech	Dropped: Northeastern	Dropped: Army	None	

== USA Today ==
	Preseason Nov 2	Week 1 Nov 16	Week 2 Nov 23	Week 3 Nov 30	Week 4 Dec 7	Week 5 Dec 14	Week 6 Dec 21	Week 7 Dec 28	Week 8 Jan 4	Week 9 Jan 11	Week 10 Jan 18	Week 11 Jan 25	Week 12 Feb 1	Week 13 Feb 8	Week 14 Feb 15	Week 15 Feb 22	Week 16 Mar 1	Week 17 Mar 8	Week 18 Mar 15	Week 19 Mar 22	Week 20 Mar 29	Final Apr 12	
1.	North Dakota (22)	North Dakota (0–0–0) (27)	North Dakota (0–0–0) (28)	North Dakota (0–0–0) (15)	North Dakota (3–0–0) (21)	Minnesota (8–0–0) (23)	Minnesota (8–0–0) (27)	Minnesota (8–0–0) (29)	Minnesota (9–0–0) (30)	Minnesota (11–1–0) (28)	Boston College (8–2–0) (28)	Boston College (9–2–1) (23)	Boston College (9–2–1) (22)	North Dakota (13–4–1) (17)	North Dakota (15–4–1) (19)	North Dakota (17–4–1) (20)	North Dakota (18–4–1) (34)	Boston College (16–4–1) (18)	Boston College (17–4–1) (19)	North Dakota (21–5–1) (34)	Minnesota State (22–4–1) (20)	Massachusetts (20–5–4) (34)	1.
2.	Boston College (3)	Boston College (0–0–0) (3)	Boston College (0–0–0) (2)	Boston College (2–0–0) (16)	Boston College (4–0–0) (13)	Boston College (5–1–0) (6)	Boston College (5–1–0) (6)	Boston College (5–1–0) (5)	Boston College (5–1–0) (4)	North Dakota (8–2–1) (6)	Minnesota State (7–1–1) (3)	Minnesota State (9–1–1) (7)	Minnesota (15–3–0) (11)	Boston College (11–3–1) (12)	Boston College (13–3–1) (12)	Boston College (15–3–1) (12)	Boston College (15–4–1)	North Dakota (18–5–1) (10)	North Dakota (19–5–1) (11)	Minnesota (23–6–0)	Massachusetts (18–5–4) (5)	St. Cloud State (20–11–0)	2.
3.	Minnesota–Duluth (3)	Minnesota–Duluth (0–0–0) (2)	Michigan (4–0–0) (4)	Minnesota–Duluth (0–0–0) (2)	Minnesota–Duluth (3–0–0)	Minnesota–Duluth (5–1–1) (2)	North Dakota (7–2–1) (1)	North Dakota (7–2–1)	North Dakota (7–2–1)	Boston College (6–2–0)	North Dakota (9–3–1) (2)	North Dakota (12–3–1) (4)	North Dakota (13–4–1) (1)	Minnesota State (11–2–1) (4)	Minnesota State (13–2–1) (3)	Minnesota State (15–2–1)	Minnesota (19–5–0)	Minnesota State (18–3–1) (6)	Minnesota State (20–3–1) (4)	Boston College (17–5–1)	St. Cloud State (19–10–0) (3)	Minnesota State (22–5–1)	3.
4.	Denver (1)	Minnesota State (0–0–0) (2)	Minnesota–Duluth (0–0–0)	Denver (0–0–0)	Minnesota (6–0–0)	North Dakota (4–2–1) (3)	Minnesota–Duluth (5–2–2)	Minnesota–Duluth (5–2–2)	Minnesota State (5–1–1)	Minnesota State (5–1–1)	Minnesota (11–3–0) (1)	Minnesota (13–3–0)	Minnesota State (9–2–1)	Minnesota–Duluth (12–5–2) (1)	Minnesota (17–5–0)	Minnesota (19–5–0)	Minnesota State (16–3–1)	Wisconsin (19–8–1)	Minnesota (21–6–0)	Wisconsin (20–9–1)	North Dakota (22–6–1) (6)	Minnesota–Duluth (15–11–2)	4.
5.	Minnesota State (3)	Denver (0–0–0)	Minnesota State (1–0–0)	Minnesota (4–0–0) (1)	Michigan (5–3–0)	Minnesota State (2–1–0)	Minnesota State (3–1–1)	Minnesota State (3–1–1)	Minnesota–Duluth (6–3–2)	St. Cloud State (9–4–0)	Bowling Green (14–2–0)	St. Cloud State (11–6–0)	St. Cloud State (11–6–0)	Minnesota (15–5–0)	Wisconsin (14–8–0)	Wisconsin (15–8–1)	Wisconsin (17–8–1)	Minnesota (20–6–0)	Wisconsin (19–8–1)	Massachusetts (16–5–4)	Minnesota–Duluth (15–10–2)	North Dakota (22–6–1)	5.
6.	Cornell (3)	Michigan (2–0–0)	Denver (0–0–0)	Minnesota State (1–0–0)	Minnesota State (1–1–0)	Michigan (5–5–0)	St. Cloud State (6–3–0)	St. Cloud State (6–3–0)	Bowling Green (11–1–0)	Massachusetts (9–3–1)	St. Cloud State (9–6–0)	Minnesota–Duluth (8–5–2)	Minnesota–Duluth (10–5–2)	Wisconsin (13–7–0)	Michigan (11–7–0)	St. Cloud State (14–8–0)	Massachusetts (13–5–3)	St. Cloud State (15–9–0)	Michigan (15–9–1)	Minnesota State (20–4–1)	Minnesota (24–7–0)	Boston College (17–6–1)	6.
7.	Massachusetts	Massachusetts (0–0–0)	Minnesota (2–0–0)	Michigan (4–2–0)	Clarkson (2–1–0)	Denver (2–4–0)	Michigan (5–5–0)	Bowling Green (8–1–0)	St. Cloud State (7–4–0)	Bowling Green (12–2–0)	Minnesota–Duluth (6–5–2)	Michigan (10–6–0)	Michigan (10–6–0)	St. Cloud State (12–7–0)	St. Cloud State (13–8–0)	Michigan (12–8–0)	Michigan (13–8–1)	Michigan (14–9–1)	Massachusetts (14–5–4)	St. Cloud State (17–10–0)	Boston College (17–6–1)	Minnesota (24–7–0)	7.
8.	Clarkson	Clarkson (0–0–0)	Massachusetts (1–0–1)	Clarkson (2–1–0)	Denver (0–3–0)	Clarkson (4–2–0)	Bowling Green (8–1–0)	Michigan (5–5–0)	Massachusetts (8–3–1)	Minnesota–Duluth (6–5–2)	Massachusetts (9–4–1)	Bowling Green (14–4–0)	Bowling Green (16–4–0)	Michigan (10–6–0)	Minnesota–Duluth (12–7–2)	Boston University (9–2–0)	St. Cloud State (14–9–0)	Massachusetts (13–5–4)	St. Cloud State (16–9–0)	Michigan (15–10–1)	Wisconsin (20–10–1)	Wisconsin (20–10–1)	8.
9.	Penn State	Penn State (0–0–0)	Clarkson (1–0–0)	Massachusetts (1–2–1)	UMass Lowell (0–0–0)	St. Cloud State (4–2–0)	Clarkson (4–2–0)	Massachusetts (5–3–1)	Michigan (5–5–0)	Omaha (6–3–1)	Michigan (8–6–0)	Omaha (9–4–1)	Massachusetts (11–5–3)	Massachusetts (11–5–3)	Massachusetts (11–5–3)	Massachusetts (11–5–3)	Minnesota–Duluth (13–8–2)	Minnesota–Duluth (13–9–2)	Minnesota–Duluth (14–9–2)	Minnesota–Duluth (14–10–2)	Michigan (15–10–1)	Michigan (15–10–1)	9.
10.	Ohio State	Ohio State (0–0–0)	Ohio State (0–0–0)	UMass Lowell (0–0–0)	Quinnipiac (0–0–0)	Northeastern (2–0–0)	Massachusetts (4–3–1)	Northeastern (3–1–2)	Clarkson (6–3–1)	Michigan (6–6–0)	Quinnipiac (10–4–1)	Massachusetts (9–5–3)	Omaha (10–5–1)	Omaha (11–6–1)	Omaha (13–6–1)	Minnesota–Duluth (12–8–2)	Quinnipiac (16–5–4)	Boston University (10–3–1)	Quinnipiac (17–6–4)	Quinnipiac (17–7–4)	Bemidji State (16–10–3)	Bemidji State (16–10–3)	10.
11.	UMass Lowell	Minnesota (0–0–0)	Quinnipiac (0–0–0)	Quinnipiac (0–0–0)	St. Cloud State (3–0–0)	Quinnipiac (0–0–0)	Northeastern (2–1–1)	Omaha (6–3–1)	Omaha (6–3–1)	Quinnipiac (8–4–1)	Omaha (6–3–1)	Quinnipiac (10–5–3)	Quinnipiac (10–5–3)	Quinnipiac (12–5–3)	Quinnipiac (13–5–4)	Quinnipiac (13–5–4)	Boston University (10–3–0)	Quinnipiac (17–6–4)	Boston University (10–4–1)	Boston University (10–4–1)	Quinnipiac (17–8–4)	Quinnipiac (17–8–4)	11.
12.	Michigan	UMass Lowell (0–0–0)	UMass Lowell (0–0–0)	Providence (0–0–0)	Massachusetts (2–3–1)	Bowling Green (6–1–0)	Denver (3–6–1)	Clarkson (4–3–0)	Quinnipiac (6–3–1)	Clarkson (7–5–1)	Wisconsin (8–6–0)	Northeastern (6–3–2)	Wisconsin (11–7–0)	Bowling Green (16–6–0)	Boston University (8–2–0)	Omaha (13–8–1)	Omaha (13–9–1)	Omaha (14–9–1)	Bemidji State (15–8–3)	Omaha (14–10–1)	Boston University (10–5–1)	Boston University (10–5–1)	12.
13.	Minnesota	Wisconsin (2–0–0)	Providence (0–0–0)	Notre Dame (2–2–0)	Wisconsin (5–5–0)	Massachusetts (2–3–1)	Providence (2–2–1)	Quinnipiac (6–2–0)	UMass Lowell (2–1–0)	Northeastern (5–3–2)	Northeastern (6–3–2)	Wisconsin (9–7–0)	Clarkson (9–6–3)	Boston University (6–2–0)	Bowling Green (16–8–0) т	Clarkson (9–7–4)	Bowling Green (19–8–1)	Bowling Green (19–8–1)	Omaha (14–10–1)	Lake Superior State (19–6–3)	Lake Superior State (19–7–3)	Lake Superior State (19–7–3)	13.
14.	Quinnipiac	Quinnipiac (0–0–0)	Penn State (0–2–0)	Ohio State (1–3–1)	Northeastern (0–0–0)	Wisconsin (5–5–0)	Omaha (5–3–1)	Denver (3–6–1)	Wisconsin (5–5–0)	Wisconsin (6–6–0)	Clarkson (8–6–1)	Clarkson (9–6–3)	Northeastern (6–3–2)	AIC (13–3–0)	Clarkson (9–7–4) т	Bowling Green (17–8–1)	Clarkson (11–7–4)	Clarkson (11–7–4)	Providence (11–8–5)	AIC (15–3–0)	Omaha (14–11–1)	Omaha (14–11–1)	14.
15.	Bemidji State	Providence (0–0–0)	Wisconsin (2–2–0)	Northeastern (0–0–0)	Notre Dame (3–3–0)	UMass Lowell (0–1–0)	Wisconsin (5–5–0)	Wisconsin (5–5–0)	Northeastern (3–3–2)	UMass Lowell (3–1–0)	Denver (5–7–1)	Boston University (5–1–0)	Boston University (5–1–0)	Clarkson (9–7–4) т Connecticut (8–6–2) т	AIC (13–3–0)	AIC (13–3–0)	AIC (13–3–0)	AIC (13–3–0)	AIC (13–3–0)	Bemidji State (15–9–3)	AIC (15–4–0)	AIC (15–4–0)	15.
	Preseason Nov 2	Week 1 Nov 16	Week 2 Nov 23	Week 3 Nov 30	Week 4 Dec 7	Week 5 Dec 14	Week 6 Dec 21	Week 7 Dec 28	Week 8 Jan 4	Week 9 Jan 11	Week 10 Jan 18	Week 11 Jan 25	Week 12 Feb 1	Week 13 Feb 8	Week 14 Feb 15	Week 15 Feb 22	Week 16 Mar 1	Week 17 Mar 8	Week 18 Mar 15	Week 19 Mar 22	Week 20 Mar 29	Final Apr 12	
		Dropped: Cornell; Bemidji State	None	Dropped: Penn State; Wisconsin	Dropped: Providence; Ohio State	Dropped: Notre Dame	Dropped: Quinnipiac; UMass Lowell	Dropped: Providence	Dropped: Denver	None	Dropped: UMass Lowell	Dropped: Denver	None	Dropped: Northeastern	Dropped: Connecticut	None	None	None	Dropped: Bowling Green; Clarkson	Dropped: Providence	None	None	
