= Eamon Powell =

American ice hockey player (born 2002)

- Born: May 10, 2002 (age 24) Marcellus, New York, U.S.
- Height: 5 ft 11 in (180 cm)
- Weight: 165 lb (75 kg; 11 st 11 lb)
- Position: Defense
- Shoots: Left
- AHL team Former teams: Utica Comets; Charlotte Checkers
- NHL draft: 116th overall, 2020; Tampa Bay Lightning
- Playing career: 2025–present

Eamon Powell (born May 10, 2002) is an American professional ice hockey defenseman for the Utica Comets of the American Hockey League (AHL). He played college ice hockey at Boston College.

== Playing career ==
=== College ===
Powell began his collegiate career for Boston College during the 2020–21 season. During his freshman year he recorded two goals and 12 assists in 24 games. He ranked seventh among Hockey East defensemen in scoring and led all rookies. Following the season he was named to the All Hockey-East Rookie Team. During the 2021–22 season, in his sophomore year, he recorded nine assists in 38 games, and ranked second on the team with 40 blocked shots. During the 2022–23 season, in his junior year, he recorded five goals and 17 assists in 36 games, and led the with 60 blocked shots.

During the 2023–24 season, in his senior year, he served as team captain and recorded a career-high five goals and 33 assists in 40 games. He finished fourth nationally among defensemen in assists (33) and points (38). He helped lead Boston College to the Frozen Four for the first time since 2016. Following the season he was named to the All Hockey-East Second Team and won the Len Ceglarski Award, along with Ryan Ufko. During the 2024–25 season, as a graduate student, he again served as team captain and recorded four goals and 16 assists in 32 games. Following the season he was named to the All Hockey-East First Team and Hockey East Best Defensive Defenseman. He was also named an AHCA East Second Team All-American. He finished his collegiate career with 16 goals and 87 assists in 170 games. His 170 games played are the most in program history.

=== Professional ===
On April 4, 2025, he signed a one-year, one-way contract with the Charlotte Checkers of the AHL for the 2025–26 season. He also signed an amateur tryout contract (ATO) with the Checkers for the remainder of the 2024–25 season.

At the conclusion of his contract with the Checkers, Powell left as a free agent but remained in the AHL after signing a one-year contract with the Utica Comets, affiliate to the New Jersey Devils, on July 3, 2026.

== Personal life ==
Powell was born to Chris and Katie Powell, and has two brothers, Emmet and Seamus. His mother played college soccer at Niagara.

== Career statistics ==
			Regular season					Playoffs
Season	Team	League	GP	G	A	Pts	PIM	GP	G	A	Pts	PIM
2020–21	Boston College	HE	24	2	12	14	6	—	—	—	—	—
2021–22	Boston College	HE	38	0	9	9	4	—	—	—	—	—
2022–23	Boston College	HE	36	5	17	22	16	—	—	—	—	—
2023–24	Boston College	HE	40	5	33	38	8	—	—	—	—	—
2024–25	Boston College	HE	32	4	16	20	12	—	—	—	—	—
2024–25	Charlotte Checkers	AHL	5	1	1	2	0	4	0	3	3	0
2025–26	Charlotte Checkers	AHL	23	1	6	7	18	—	—	—	—	—
2025–26	Savannah Ghost Pirates	ECHL	4	0	3	3	2	—	—	—	—	—
AHL totals			28	2	7	9	18	4	0	3	3	0

== Awards and honors ==
Award	Year
College
All-Hockey East Rookie Team	2021
All-Hockey East Second Team	2024
Len Ceglarski Award	2024
Hockey East All-Tournament Team	2024
All-Hockey East First Team	2025
Hockey East Best Defensive Defenseman	2025
AHCA East Second Team All-American	2025

Awards and achievements
Preceded by Cade Webber	Hockey East Best Defensive Defenseman; 2024–25	Succeeded by Brandon Holt
