= Red Gendron =

Canadian ice hockey coach (1957–2021)

Biographical details
- Born: November 27, 1957; Boston, Massachusetts, U.S.
- Died: April 9, 2021 (aged 63); Orono, Maine, U.S.
- Education: New England College, BA (1979); University of Maine, ME (1993)

Coaching career (HC unless noted)
- 1981–1990: Bellows Free Academy
- 1990–1993: Maine (assistant)
- 1994–1996: New Jersey Devils (assistant)
- 1996–2000: Albany River Rats (assistant)
- 2000–2002: New Jersey Devils (scout)
- 2002–2004: Albany River Rats
- 2004–2005: Indiana Ice
- 2005–2011: UMass (assistant)
- 2011–2013: Yale (associate HC)
- 2013–2021: Maine

Head coaching record
- Overall: 103–137–33 (.438)

Accomplishments and honors

Championships
- 1993 NCAA Championship (assistant); 1995 Stanley Cup (assistant); 2000 Stanley Cup (assistant); 2013 NCAA Championship (associate)

Dennis "Red" Gendron (November 27, 1957 – April 9, 2021) was an ice hockey coach, most recently for the University of Maine men's ice hockey team. Gendron previously served as head coach for the Albany River Rats and Indiana Ice and held multiple positions for the New Jersey Devils, Albany River Rats, University of Maine, University of Massachusetts, Yale University, and Team USA

== Coaching career ==
=== High school ===
Gendron's first coaching position was as assistant coach to Albie Brodeur for two seasons, from 1979 to 1981 at his alma mater, Berlin High School in Berlin, New Hampshire. In 1981, he accepted his first head coaching position at Bellows Free Academy, in St. Albans, Vermont. During his nine years at BFA, Gendron led the Bobwhites to four state championships (1982, 1983, 1987 and 1988) and was twice named Vermont coach of the year. While at BFA he coached future NHL All-Star John LeClair, coached baseball and football, and taught history.

=== University of Maine (1990–93) ===
Gendron's entered the collegiate coaching ranks in 1990 as an assistant coach for Shawn Walsh at the University of Maine men's hockey team. In his third season as an assistant at Maine, Gendron helped guide the Black Bears to the 1993 NCAA Division I Men's Ice Hockey Championship and an overall record of 42–1–2. During his two seasons as assistant coach at Maine, Gendron coached two Hobey Baker Award winners, Scott Pellerin in 1991–92 and Paul Kariya in 1992–93.

=== New Jersey Devils/Albany River Rats ===
In the summer of 1993 the New Jersey Devils hired Gendron to serve as a technological specialist for the 1993–94 season. The following season, 1994–95, Gendron was promoted to assistant coach serving under head coach Jacques Lemaire and alongside fellow assistant coach Larry Robinson. That season the Devils would go on to defeat the Detroit Red Wings to capture the team's first Stanley Cup championship.

For the 1996–97 season, Gendron was named assistant coach of the New Jersey Devils AHL affiliate Albany River Rats, a position he remained in until the 1999–00 season. During the 2000–01 and 2001–02 season Gendron served as a scout for the Devils.

Gendron became head coach of the Albany River Rats for the 2002–03 season. He was replaced during the 2003–04 AHL season by Robbie Ftorek.

During Gendron's tenure as a member of the New Jersey Devils organization the team won three Stanley Cup Championships 1995, 2000, 2003 and finished runner-up in 2001. His name was engraved on the Stanley Cup in 1995 and 2000.

=== Indiana Ice ===
On June 17, 2004, the USHL's Indiana Ice named Gendron head coach.

=== University of Massachusetts ===
In July 2005 Gendron was hired by Don "Toot" Cahoon to serve as assistant coach for the University of Massachusetts men's hockey team, a position he held for six seasons. While at UMass, he helped the Minutemen reach the 2007 NCAA Division I Men's Ice Hockey Tournament where they eventually lost in the regional final to the University of Maine. That postseason appearance represented the first NCAA Division 1 tournament appearance for the Minutemen since the program rejoined Division 1 for the 1993–94 season.

=== Yale University ===
In 2011, Gendron was named associate head coach at Yale University, a position he would remain in for two seasons. In his second season as an associate head coach of the Bulldogs, Gendron helped guide the team to the first national championship in school history in 2013.

=== University of Maine (2013–2021) ===
On May 17, 2013, Gendron was named the fifth head coach in the history of the University of Maine men's hockey.

=== International ===
Gendron served as an assistant coach for 1993, 2001, and 2002 World Junior Championships for Team USA and also has worked several U.S. Select 16 and 17 teams.

== Author ==
Gendron's book Coaching Hockey Successfully, published in 2002, is used by USA Hockey as the advanced-level manual for its coaching education program.

== Personal life ==
Gendron grew up in Berlin, New Hampshire, graduated from Berlin High School in 1975, and played on the state championship hockey team his senior year. Gendron attended New England College in Henniker, New Hampshire where he studied History and Secondary Education, played on the baseball team, and played defenseman and served as a three-year captain for the hockey team. He and his wife, Janet, had two daughters, Katelyn and Allison. Gendron was fluent in both French and English, and spoke some Russian.

Gendron died after a medical event while golfing on April 9, 2021.

== Head coaching record ==
Record table
| Season | Team | Overall | Conference | Standing | Postseason |
|---|---|---|---|---|---|
Maine Black Bears (Hockey East) (2013–2021)
| 2013–14 | Maine | 16–15–4 | 9–8–3 | 6th | Hockey East Quarterfinals |
| 2014–15 | Maine | 14–22–3 | 8–12–2 | t-9th | Hockey East Opening Round |
| 2015–16 | Maine | 8–24–6 | 5–15–2 | 11th | Hockey East Opening Round |
| 2016–17 | Maine | 11–21–4 | 5–15–2 | 11th | Hockey East Opening Round |
| 2017–18 | Maine | 18–16–4 | 10–11–3 | t-5th | Hockey East Quarterfinals |
| 2018–19 | Maine | 15–17–4 | 11–9–4 | 6th | Hockey East Quarterfinals |
| 2019–20 | Maine | 18–11–5 | 12–9–3 | 4th | Tournament cancelled |
| 2020–21 | Maine | 3–11–2 | 3–10–2 | 8th | Hockey East Opening Round |
| Maine: | | 103–137–33 (.438) | 65–97–22 (.413) | | |
| Total: | | 103–137–33 (.438) | | | |
National champion Postseason invitational champion Conference regular season champion Conference regular season and conference tournament champion Division regular season champion Division regular season and conference tournament champion Conference tournament champion

Awards and achievements
| Preceded by Greg Carvel | Bob Kullen Coach of the Year Award; 2019–20 | Succeeded by Jerry York |
