= 2019 Hockey East men's ice hockey tournament =

2019 Hockey East Men's ice hockey tournament
- Dates: March 15–23, 2019
- Teams: 8
- Finals site: TD Garden; Boston, Massachusetts
- Champions: Northeastern (3rd title)
- Winning coach: Jim Madigan (2nd title)
- MVP: Cayden Primeau (Northeastern)
- Hockey East Men's Ice Hockey Tournaments

The 2019 Hockey East Men's Ice Hockey Tournament was the 35th tournament in the history of the conference. It was played between March 15 and March 23, 2019, at campus locations and at the TD Garden in Boston, Massachusetts. Northeastern won their 3rd tournament and earned Hockey East's automatic bid into the 2019 NCAA Division I Men's Ice Hockey Tournament.

== Format ==
In a departure from the format of the last few years, just eight of the 11 teams will qualify for the 2019 Hockey East tournament. The top four teams in the league standings will host seeds five through eight on campus in the quarterfinals in the first round of the playoffs, while the remaining teams will be eliminated from championship contention.

The four quarterfinal winners will be reseeded again as they advance to the TD Garden in Boston for the semifinals and Championship Game.

=== Standings ===
2018–19 Hockey East Standings
	Conference record							Overall record					
	GP	W	L	T	PTS	GF	GA	GP	W	L	T	GF	GA
#2 Massachusetts †	24	18	6	0	36	92	51	41	31	10	0	151	83
#4 Providence	24	14	7	3	31	76	44	42	24	12	6	133	84
#9 Northeastern*	24	15	8	1	31	76	52	39	27	11	1	118	81
#19 Massachusetts–Lowell	24	12	7	5	29	65	55	37	19	13	5	100	85
Boston University	24	12	9	3	27	64	65	38	16	18	4	99	104
Maine	24	11	9	4	26	64	60	36	15	17	4	90	99
Boston College	24	10	11	3	23	62	60	39	14	22	3	90	110
New Hampshire	24	8	10	6	22	55	67	36	12	15	9	90	103
Connecticut	24	7	15	2	16	52	77	34	12	20	2	81	107
Vermont	24	5	16	3	13	41	59	34	12	19	3	72	82
Merrimack	24	4	18	2	10	48	105	34	7	24	3	67	134
Championship: March 23, 2019 † indicates conference regular season champion * indicates conference tournament champion (Lamoriello Trophy); Rankings: USCHO.com Top 20 Poll

== Bracket ==
Teams are reseeded for the Semifinals

Quarterfinals; March 15–17
1	Massachusetts	5**	6	—
8	New Hampshire	4	0	—
2	Providence	5*	3	1
7	Boston College	4	4*	2
(Pairings are reseeded after the first round)
3	Northeastern	2*	2	—
6	Maine	1	1	—
4	Massachusetts-Lowell	0	6	1
5	Boston University	3	4	4

Semifinals; March 22
1	Massachusetts	0
7	Boston College	3
3	Northeastern	2*
5	Boston University	1

Championship; March 23
7	Boston College	2
3	Northeastern	3

Note: * denotes overtime period(s)

== Results ==
=== (1) Massachusetts vs. (8) New Hampshire ===
==== Game 1, March 15 ====
Scoring summary
Period	Team	Goal	Assist(s)	Time	Score
1st	None				
2nd	UNH	Brendan van Riemsdyk	Vela and MacAdams	20:57	1–0 UNH
2nd	UNH	Angus Crookshank	Kelleher and Maas	21:45	2–0 UNH
2nd	UNH	Chris Miller	unassisted	32:30	3–0 UNH
2nd	UMASS	Bobby Trivigno	Prichtard and M. Del Gaizo	30:05	3–1 UNH
3rd	UMASS	Jacob Prichtard	Trivigno and Lagunov	41:08	3–2 UNH
3rd	UNH	Chris Miller	Esposito and Boyd	45:18	4–2 UNH
3rd	UMASS	Bobby Trivigno	Prichtard and Lagunov	47:50	4–3 UNH
3rd	UMASS	Cale Makar	Gaudet	51:28	4–4
2OT	UMASS	Mitchell Chafee	Farmer and Gaudet	85:52	5–4 UMASS

Goaltenders
Team	Name	Saves	Goals against	Time on ice
UNH	Mike Robinson	48	5	
UMASS	Matt Murray	11	3	
UMASS	Filip Lindberg	13	1	

==== Game 2, March 16 ====
Scoring summary
Period	Team	Goal	Assist(s)	Time	Score
1st	UMASS	Cale Makar	M. Del Gaizo and Prichtard	04:36	1–0 UMASS
1st	UMASS	Jacob Prichtard	Farmer and Trivigno	07:27	2–0 UMASS
1st	UMASS	Brett Boeing	Hildenbrand	12:45	3–0 UMASS
1st	UMASS	Bobby Trivigno	Makar and Leonard	14:37	4–0 UMASS
2nd	UMASS	Colin Felix	McLaughlin and Prichtard	24:52	5–0 UMASS
2nd	UMASS	Brett Boeing	Makar and Leonard	28:33	6–0 UMASS
3rd	None				

Goaltenders
Team	Name	Saves	Goals against	Time on ice
UNH	Mike Robinson	5	4	
UNH	Ty Taylor	14	2	
UMASS	Filip Lindberg	18	0	

=== (2) Providence vs. (7) Boston College ===
==== Game 1, March 15 ====
Scoring summary
Period	Team	Goal	Assist(s)	Time	Score
1st	PC	Vimal Sukumaran	Koopman and McDermott	01:48	1–0 PC
1st	BC	Marc McLaughlin	Kim and Finklestein	02:21	1–1
1st	BC	Christopher Grando	unassisted	06:17	2–1 BC
1st	BC	Michael Kim	Walker and Giles	08:39	3–1 BC
2nd
2nd	PC	Spenser Young	Bryson and Conway	39:55	3–2 BC
3rd	PC	Spenser Young – PPG	Dugan and Mirageas	43:59	3–3
3rd	PC	Vincent Desharnais	Conway and Dugan	48:56	4–3 PC
3rd	BC	Julius Mattila – EA	Wahlstrom and Cotton	58:24	4–4
OT	PC	Brandon Duhamie	Thompson and Callahan	61:31	5–4 PC

Goaltenders
Team	Name	Saves	Goals against	Time on ice
BC	Joseph Woll	34	5	
PC	Hayden Hawkey	25	4	

==== Game 2, March 16 ====
Scoring summary
Period	Team	Goal	Assist(s)	Time	Score
1st	BC	JD Dudek	Kim and Finklestein	08:01	1–0 BC
1st	BC	David Cotton	Mattila and Hutsko	09:25	2–0 BC
2nd
2nd	PC	Josh Wilkins	Dugan	25:44	2–1 BC
2nd	PC	Josh Wilkins	Dugan and Bjorkqvist	35:09	2–2
3rd	PC	Kasper Bjorkqvist	Dugan and Wilkins	44:25	3–2 PC
3rd	BC	Marc McLaughlin	Hutsko and Wahlstrom	48:32	3–3
OT	BC	Logan Hutsko	Kim	60:23	4–3 BC

Goaltenders
Team	Name	Saves	Goals against	Time on ice
BC	Joseph Woll	34	3	
PC	Hayden Hawkey	23	4	

==== Game 3, March 17 ====
Scoring summary
Period	Team	Goal	Assist(s)	Time	Score
1st	None				
2nd	BC	Michael Kim	Fitzgerald	28:22	1–0 BC
3rd	PC	Scott Conway	Wilkins and Mirageas	46:58	1–1
3rd	BC	Logan Hutsko	Fitzgerald and Mattila	51:55	2–1 BC

Goaltenders
Team	Name	Saves	Goals against	Time on ice
PC	Hayden Hawkey	25	2	
BC	Joseph Woll	37	1	

=== (3) Northeastern vs. (6) Maine ===
==== Game 1, March 15 ====
Scoring summary
Period	Team	Goal	Assist(s)	Time	Score
1st	None				
2nd	NU	Tyler Madden	Griffin and Solow	28:29	1–0 NU
2nd	Maine	Brady Keeper	unassisted	36:20	1–1
3rd	None				
OT	NU	Austin Goldstein	Shea	64:15	2–1 NU

Goaltenders
Team	Name	Saves	Goals against	Time on ice
Maine	Jeremy Swayman	30	2	
NU	Cayden Primeau	41	1	

==== Game 2, March 16 ====
Scoring summary
Period	Team	Goal	Assist(s)	Time	Score
1st	NU	Biagio Lerario	Schule	18:09	1–0 NU
2nd	NU	Brandon Hawkins – PPG	Davies and Pecararo	20:10	2–0 NU
2nd	Maine	Jacob Schmidt-Svejstrup – PPG	Becker and Sirota	28:42	2–1 NU
3rd	None				

Goaltenders
Team	Name	Saves	Goals against	Time on ice
Maine	Jeremy Swayman	15	2	
NU	Cayden Primeau	33	1	

=== (4) Massachusetts–Lowell vs. (5) Boston University ===
==== Game 1, March 15 ====
Scoring summary
Period	Team	Goal	Assist(s)	Time	Score
1st	None				
2nd	BU	Joel Farabee	Fabbro and Kotkansalo	26:24	1–0 BU
2nd	BU	Cam Crotty – PPG	Farrance and Amonte	38:26	2–0 BU
3rd	BU	Patrick Curry – EN	Farrabee and Bowers	59:35	3–0 BU

Goaltenders
Team	Name	Saves	Goals against	Time on ice
UML	Christoffer Hernberg	24	2	
BU	Jake Oettinger	25	0	

==== Game 2, March 16 ====
Scoring summary
Period	Team	Goal	Assist(s)	Time	Score
1st	UML	Chase Blackmun – PPG	Levesque and Stefanson	03:37	1–0 UML
1st	UML	Ryan Dmowski – PPG	Wilson and Goransson	11:32	2–0 UML
1st	UML	Kenny Hausinger	Dmowski and Baxter	12:35	3–0 UML
2nd	BU	Patrick Curry – PPG	Farrance and Harper	21:19	3–1 UML
2nd	UML	Ryan Dmowski – PPG	Hausinger and Wall	23:28	4–1 UML
2nd	BU	Cam Crotty – EA	Curry and Krys	27:49	4–2 UML
2nd	BU	Joel Farabee – PPG	Levesque and Stefanson	28:32	4–3 UML
2nd	UML	Reid Stefanson	Barton and Lohin	29:36	5–3 UML
2nd	BU	Joel Farabee – SH	unassisted	34:28	5–4 UML
3rd	UML	Nick Master	Goransson	41:07	6–4 UML

Goaltenders
Team	Name	Saves	Goals against	Time on ice
BU	Jake Oettinger	19	6	
UML	Tyler Wall	27	4	

==== Game 3, March 17 ====
Scoring summary
Period	Team	Goal	Assist(s)	Time	Score
1st	BU	Chad Krys	Harper and Cockerill	03:28	1–0 BU
1st	BU	Joel Farabee	Krys and Crotty	12:05	2–0 BU
1st	BU	Patrick Harper	Curry	14:28	3–0 BU
1st	BU	Joel Farabee	unassisted	18:34	4–0 BU
2nd	None				
3rd	UML	Kenny Hausinger	Wilson and Master	41:07	4–1 BU

Goaltenders
Team	Name	Saves	Goals against	Time on ice
BU	Jake Oettinger	18	1	
UML	Christoffer Hernberg	10	3	
UML	Tyler Wall	15	0	

=== Semifinals ===
==== (1) Massachusetts vs (7) Boston College ====
Scoring summary
Period	Team	Goal	Assist(s)	Time	Score
1st	BC	David Cotton	Hutsko and Matilla	19:47	1–0 BC
2nd	None				
3rd	BC	Christopher Grando	Dudek and Fitzgerald	36:36	2–0 BC
3rd	BC	Julius Mattila – EN	McLaughlin	59:22	3–0 BC

Goaltenders
Team	Name	Saves	Goals against	Time on ice
UMASS	Filip Lindberg	29	2	
BC	Joseph Woll	36	0	

==== (3) Northeastern vs. (5) Boston University ====
Scoring summary
Period	Team	Goal	Assist(s)	Time	Score
1st	None				
2nd	BU	Ty Amonte – PPG	Curry and Farrance	27:39	1–0 BU
3rd	NU	Tyler Madden	Filipe and Harris	40:16	1–1
OT	NU	Zach Solow	Hawkins	75:44	2–1 NU

Goaltenders
Team	Name	Saves	Goals against	Time on ice
BU	Jake Oettinger	42	2	
NU	Cayden Primeau	29	1	

=== Championship ===
==== (3) Northeastern vs. (7) Boston College ====
March 23	Northeastern	3–2	Boston College	TD Garden	Recap
( 38 saves / 40 shots ) Cayden Primeau		Goalie stats	Joseph Woll ( 23 saves / 26 shots )

Scoring summary
Period	Team	Goal	Assist(s)	Time	Score
1st	NU	Matt Filipe	Hawkins	02:31	1–0 NU
1st	NU	Brandon Hawkins	Shea and Filipe	05:08	2–0 NU
1st	NU	Brandon Hawkins – PPG	Pecararo and Davies	11:15	3–0 NU
2nd	BC	Oliver Wahlstrom – PPG	Cotton and Hutsko	20:18	3–1 NU
2nd	BC	David Cotton – PPG	Hutsko and Finklestein	21:57	3–2 NU
3rd	None				

Goaltenders
Team	Name	Saves	Goals against	Time on ice
BC	Joseph Woll	23	3	
NU	Cayden Primeau	38	2	

== Tournament awards ==
=== All-Tournament Team ===
- G Cayden Primeau* (Northeastern)
- D Jeremy Davies (Northeastern)
- D Ryan Shea (Northeastern)
- F Brandon Hawkins (Northeastern)
- F Zach Solow (Northeastern)
- F David Cotton (Boston College)

* Tournament MVP(s)
