= 2018–19 Maine Black Bears men's ice hockey season =

- Conference: Hockey East
- Home ice: Alfond Arena

Record
- Overall: 15–17–4 (11–9–4 HEA)
- Home: 10–7–1
- Road: 5–10–3
- Neutral: 0–0–0

Coaches and captains
- Head coach: Red Gendron
- Assistant coaches: Ben Guite; Alfie Michaud; Colten St. Clair
- Captain(s): Chase Pearson; Rob Michel
- Alternate captain(s): Mitchell Fossier; Keith Muehlbauer

The 2018–19 Maine Black Bears Men's ice hockey season was the 44th season of play for the program, the 42nd season competing at the Division I level, and the 35th season in the Hockey East conference. The Black Bears represented the University of Maine and played their home games at Alfond Arena, and were coached by Red Gendron, in his 6th season as their head coach.

== Personnel ==
Head Coach: Red Gendron, 5th season
Assistant Coach: Ben Guite, 5th season
Assistant Coach: Alfie Michaud, 3rd season
Volunteer Assistant Coach: Colten St. Clair

== Roster ==
As of March 10, 2018.

No.	Nat.	Player	Class	Pos	Height	Weight	DoB	Hometown	Previous team	NHL rights
1		Jeremy Swayman	Sophomore	G	6' 3" (1.91 m)	200 lb (91 kg)		Anchorage, Alaska	Sioux Falls Stampede (USHL)	BOS, 111 overall 2017
2		Jakub Sirota	Freshman	D	6' 2" (1.88 m)	190 lb (86 kg)		Kroměříž, Czech Republic	Lone Star Brahmas (NAHL)	—
3		Rob Michel (C)	Senior	D	6' 2" (1.88 m)	195 lb (88 kg)		Camillus, New York	West Gennessee	—
4		Jack Quinlivan	Sophomore	F	6' 0" (1.83 m)	187 lb (85 kg)		Shrewsbury, Massachusetts	Boston Junior Bruins (USPHL)	—
5		Ryan Smith	Junior	F	6' 0" (1.83 m)	205 lb (93 kg)		Roanoke, Virginia	Green Bay Gamblers (USHL)	—
6		Simon Butala	Freshman	D	6' 2" (1.88 m)	193 lb (88 kg)		Downingtown, Pennsylvania	Central Illinois Flying Aces (USHL)	—
10		Kevin Hock	Sophomore	F	5' 11" (1.8 m)	178 lb (81 kg)		Braintree, Massachusetts	Dexter School	—
11		Mitchell Fossier (A)	Junior	F	5' 11" (1.8 m)	188 lb (85 kg)		Alpharetta, Georgia	Sioux City Musketeers (USHL)	—
12		Chase Pearson (C)	Sophomore	F	6' 2" (1.88 m)	205 lb (93 kg)		Alpharetta, Georgia	Youngstown Phantoms (USHL)	DET, 140 overall 2015
13		Samuel Rennaker	Junior	F	6' 0" (1.83 m)	200 lb (91 kg)		Grand Rapids, Michigan	Topeka Roadrunners (NAHL)	—
14		Jacob Schmidt-Svejstrup	Freshman	F	6' 2" (1.88 m)	210 lb (95 kg)		Charlottenlund, Denmark	Fargo Force (USHL)	—
15		Canon Pieper	Graduate	F	5' 11" (1.8 m)	185 lb (84 kg)		Roseville, Minnesota	Quinnipiac (ECAC)	—
16		Alexis Binner	Sophomore	D	6' 3" (1.91 m)	216 lb (98 kg)		Stocksund, Sweden	Green Bay Gamblers (USHL)	—
17		Tim Doherty	Junior	F	6' 0" (1.83 m)	182 lb (83 kg)		Portsmouth, Rhode Island	Boston Junior Bruins (USPHL)	—
18		Keith Muehlbauer (A)	Senior	D	6' 2" (1.88 m)	210 lb (95 kg)		Apple Valley, Minnesota	Eastview HS	—
20		Veli-Matti Tiuraniemi	Sophomore	D	6' 0" (1.83 m)	195 lb (88 kg)		Jakobstad, Finland	Dubuque Fighting Saints (USHL)	—
22		Brendan Robbins	Senior	F	6' 0" (1.83 m)	185 lb (84 kg)		Nashua, New Hampshire	Nashua North HS	—
23		Sam Becker	Senior	D	6' 0" (1.83 m)	185 lb (84 kg)		Roseville, Minnesota	Minnesota Magicians (NAHL)	—
24		Adam Dawe	Freshman	F	5' 8" (1.73 m)	161 lb (73 kg)		Gander, Newfoundland	Sioux Falls Stampede (USHL)	—
25		Brady Keeper	Sophomore	D	6' 0" (1.83 m)	195 lb (88 kg)		Cross Lake, Manitoba	OCN Blizzard (MJHL)	—
26		Cameron Spicer	Sophomore	D	6' 0" (1.83 m)	190 lb (86 kg)		Erie, Colorado	Islanders Hockey Club (USPHL)	—
27		Patrick Shea	Junior	F	5' 11" (1.8 m)	190 lb (86 kg)		Marshfield, Massachusetts	Kimball Union	FLA, 192 overall 2015
28		Adrian Holesinsky	Sophomore	F	5' 11" (1.8 m)	195 lb (88 kg)		Cadca, Czech Republic	Janesville Jets (NAHL)	—
29		Daniel Perez	Senior	F	6' 3" (1.91 m)	215 lb (98 kg)		Bloomfield, New Jersey	St. Peter's Prep	—
30		Emil Westerlund	Sophomore	F	6' 1" (1.85 m)	200 lb (91 kg)		Linköping, Sweden	Linköpings HC J20	—
33		Stephen Mundinger	Junior	G	6' 8" (2.03 m)	255 lb (116 kg)		Smithtown, New York	New York Aviators	—
34		Eduards Tralmaks	Sophomore	F	6' 4" (1.93 m)	210 lb (95 kg)		Riga, Latvia	Chicago Steel (USHL)	—
35		Rob McGovern	Junior	G	6' 4" (1.93 m)	230 lb (104 kg)		Weymouth, Massachusetts	Thayer Academy	—

== Standings ==
2018–19 Hockey East Standings
	Conference record							Overall record					
	GP	W	L	T	PTS	GF	GA	GP	W	L	T	GF	GA
#2 Massachusetts †	24	18	6	0	36	92	51	41	31	10	0	151	83
#4 Providence	24	14	7	3	31	76	44	42	24	12	6	133	84
#9 Northeastern*	24	15	8	1	31	76	52	39	27	11	1	118	81
#19 Massachusetts–Lowell	24	12	7	5	29	65	55	37	19	13	5	100	85
Boston University	24	12	9	3	27	64	65	38	16	18	4	99	104
Maine	24	11	9	4	26	64	60	36	15	17	4	90	99
Boston College	24	10	11	3	23	62	60	39	14	22	3	90	110
New Hampshire	24	8	10	6	22	55	67	36	12	15	9	90	103
Connecticut	24	7	15	2	16	52	77	34	12	20	2	81	107
Vermont	24	5	16	3	13	41	59	34	12	19	3	72	82
Merrimack	24	4	18	2	10	48	105	34	7	24	3	67	134
Championship: March 23, 2019 † indicates conference regular season champion * indicates conference tournament champion (Lamoriello Trophy); Rankings: USCHO.com Top 20 Poll

== Schedule and results ==
Date	Time	Opponent^{#}	Rank^{#}	Site	TV	Result	Record
Exhibition
October 8	6:00 PM	Prince Edward Island*		Alfond Arena • Orono, Maine		W 6–1	0–0–0
Regular Season
October 12	7:00 PM	St. Lawrence*		Alfond Arena • Orono, Maine		W 3-1	1–0–0 (0–0–0)
October 13	7:00 PM	St. Lawrence*		Alfond Arena • Orono, Maine		W 4-1	2–0–0 (0–0–0)
October 19	8:07 PM	at #2 Minnesota-Duluth*		Amsoil Arena • Duluth, Minnesota		L 2-8	2–1–0
October 20	8:07 PM	at #2 Minnesota-Duluth*		Amsoil Arena • Duluth, Minnesota		L 2–3	2–2–0
October 26	7:00 PM	at Connecticut		XL Center • Hartford, Connecticut		L 2–5	2–3–0 (0-1-0)
October 27	3:00 PM	at Connecticut		XL Center • Hartford, Connecticut		T 2–2 ^{OT}	2–3–1 (0-1-1)
November 2	7:00 PM	Mass-Lowell		Alfond Arena • Orono, Maine		W 4-3	3–3–1 (1–1–1)
November 3	7:30 PM	Mass-Lowell		Alfond Arena • Orono, Maine	FCS	L 0-1	3–4–1 (1–2–1)
November 16	7:30 PM	at Boston University		Agganis Arena • Boston, Massachusetts		L 2-3	3–5–1 (1–3–1)
November 17	7:00 PM	at Boston University		Agganis Arena • Boston, Massachusetts	NESN+	W 3-1	4–5–1 (2–3–1)
November 23	7:00 PM	#10 Quinnipiac*		Alfond Arena • Orono, Maine		L 2–7	4–6–1
November 24	7:30 PM	#10 Quinnipiac*		Alfond Arena • Orono, Maine	FCS	L 0–2	4–7–1
November 30	7:00 PM	at Vermont		Gutterson Fieldhouse • Burlington, Vermont		W 2–1 ^{OT}	5–7–1 (3–3-1)
December 1	5:00 PM	at Vermont		Gutterson Fieldhouse • Burlington, Vermont		T 3–3 ^{OT}	5–7–2 (3–3–2)
December 28	7:00 PM	at Princeton*		Hobey Baker Memorial Rink • Princeton, New Jersey	ESPN+	L 0-1	5–8–2
December 29	7:00 PM	at Princeton*		Hobey Baker Memorial Rink • Princeton, New Jersey	ESPN+	L 3-7	5–9–2
January 2	6:00 PM	Colorado College*		Alfond Arena • Orono, Maine	FCS	W 4–2	6–9–2
January 7	7:00 PM	vs. #19 Yale*		Cross Insurance Arena • Portland, Maine		W 4-3 ^{OT}	7–9–2
January 11	7:30 PM	#12 Northeastern		Alfond Arena • Orono, Maine	FCS	L 2-3	7-10-2 (3-4-2)
January 12	7:00 PM	#12 Northeastern		Alfond Arena • Orono, Maine		L 0-4	7–11–2 (3-5-2)
January 16	7:00 PM	at Boston College		Conte Forum • Chestnut Hill, Massachusetts		W 7-2	8–11–2 (4–5–2)
January 21	2:00 PM	New Hampshire		Alfond Arena • Orono, Maine		T 4-4 ^{OT}	8–11–3 (4-5-3)
January 25	7:30 PM	#2 Massachusetts		Alfond Arena • Orono, Maine	FCS	L 2-4	8–12–3 (4-6-3)
January 26	7:00 PM	#2 Massachusetts		Alfond Arena • Orono, Maine		W 4-3	9–12–3 (5–6–3)
February 1	7:00 PM	at New Hampshire		Whittemore Center • Durham, New Hampshire	NESN+	L 2-3 ^{OT}	9–13–3 (5–7–3)
February 2	7:00 PM	at New Hampshire		Whittemore Center • Durham, New Hampshire	NESN	W 5-3	10–13–3 (6–7–3)
February 8	7:00 PM	#11 Providence		Alfond Arena • Orono, Maine		L 0-1	10–14–3 (6–8–3)
February 9	7:00 PM	#11 Providence		Alfond Arena • Orono, Maine	FCN	W 3-1	11–14–3 (7–8–3)
February 15	7:00 PM	at Merrimack		Lawler Rink • North Andover, Massachusetts		T 3-3 ^{OT}	11–14–4 (7–8–4)
February 16	7:00 PM	at Merrimack		Lawler Rink • North Andover, Massachusetts		W 4-2	12–14–4 (8–8–4)
February 22	7:00 PM	Boston College		Alfond Arena • Orono, Maine		W 2-1	13–14–4 (9–8–4)
February 23	7:30 PM	Boston College		Alfond Arena • Orono, Maine	FCS	W 2-1 ^{OT}	14–14–4 (10–8–4)
March 2	8:00 PM	at #2 Massachusetts		Mullins Center • Amherst, Massachusetts	NESN+	L 0-6	14–15–4 (10–9–4)
March 9	7:30 PM	Boston University		Alfond Arena • Orono, Maine	FCS	W 6-0	15–15–4 (11–9–4)
Hockey East Tournament
March 15	7:00 PM	at #9 Northeastern*		Matthews Arena • Boston, Massachusetts (Hockey East Quarterfinals)		L 1-2 ^{OT}	15–16–4
March 16	7:00 PM	at #9 Northeastern*		Matthews Arena • Boston, Massachusetts (Hockey East Quarterfinals)		L 1-2	15–17–4
*Non-conference game. ^{#}Rankings from USCHO.com Poll. All times are in Eastern Time.

== Rankings ==
Poll	Week																							
Poll	Pre	1	2	3	4	5	6	7	8	9	10	11	12	13	14	15	16	17	18	19	20	21	22	23 (Final)
USCHO.com	NR	NR	NR	NR	NR	NR	NR	NR	NR	NR	NR	NR	NR	NR	NR	NR	NR	NR	NR	NR	NR	NR	NR	NR
USA Today	NR	NR	NR	NR	NR	NR	NR	NR	NR	NR	NR	NR	NR	NR	NR	NR	NR	NR	NR	NR	NR	NR	NR	NR
