= David Littman (ice hockey) =

American ice hockey player (born 1967)

- Born: June 13, 1967 (age 59) Cranston, Rhode Island, U.S.
- Height: 6 ft 0 in (183 cm)
- Weight: 195 lb (88 kg; 13 st 13 lb)
- Position: Goaltender
- Caught: Right
- Played for: Buffalo Sabres; Tampa Bay Lightning
- National team: United States
- NHL draft: 211th overall, 1987; Buffalo Sabres
- Playing career: 1989–2000

David K. Littman (born June 13, 1967) is an American former ice hockey goaltender. He played three games in the National Hockey League: two with the Buffalo Sabres and one with the Tampa Bay Lightning between 1991 and 1993. The rest of his career, which lasted from 1989 to 2000, was mainly spent in the minor International Hockey League. He was drafted in the eleventh round, 211th overall, of the 1987 NHL entry draft by the Sabres. Internationally Littman played for the American national team at the 1994 World Championships.

== Playing career ==
=== Collegiate ===
Littman spent four years at Boston College studying communications. In his senior year, Littman served as one of three captains on the team as the Eagles qualified for the NCAA final eight. He ended his season with .912 saves and a .895 percentage. In 2000, his BC record of 2,548 career saves was broken by Scott Clemmensen. As a result, he was selected for the AHCA East Second-Team All-American. He was drafted in the eleventh round, 211th overall, of the 1987 NHL entry draft by the Buffalo Sabres.

=== Professional ===
Littman attended the Sabres training camp but was reassigned to their International Hockey League (IHL) affiliate, the Rochester Americans, to begin the 1989–90 season. However, the 1990–91 would prove to be a breakout season for him. On January 29, 1991, Littman made his NHL debut by replacing Darcy Wakaluk in the second period. Littman saved 15 of 18 shots in an 8–3 loss to the St. Louis Blues. Upon their return to the IHL, both Littman and Wakaluk also set a new Rochester record for most points and assists by a goaltender with seven each. He was also selected for the 1991 All-Star Game. Littman shared the Harry "Hap" Holmes Memorial Award as the AHL's outstanding goaltender, with teammate Darcy Wakaluk.

The following year, he was again the recipient of the Harry "Hap" Holmes Memorial Award.

On August 28, 1992, Littman signed with the new NHL expansion team, the Tampa Bay Lightning. Although he began the season in the minor leagues with the Atlanta Knights, Littman was recalled to the NHL in November 1992. His stay in the National Hockey League was short-lived and he was reassigned to the IHL. He became a free agent at the end of the season.

As a result of his successful stints with the Atlanta Knights, Littman was selected to compete with Team USA at the 1994 IIHF World Championship, where they finished fourth in the tournament. Before his retirement, Littman played with the IHL's Orlando Solar Bears, recording 53 wins over two years before a career-ending knee injury.

== Later life ==
After working for the Solar Bears as a color commentator, Littman joined EA Sports. He began as a quality assurance associate but later was promoted to producer on the NHL series of games.

== Personal life ==
Littman was born in Queens, New York, but grew up on Long Island. His family moved to Rhode Island prior to his acceptance to Boston College. Littman was raised Jewish.

== Career statistics ==
=== Regular season and playoffs ===
			Regular season									Playoffs
Season	Team	League	GP	W	L	T	MIN	GA	SO	GAA	SV%	GP	W	L	MIN	GA	SO	GAA	SV%
1984–85	New Hampton School	HS-NH	—	—	—	—	—	—	—	—	—	—	—	—	—	—	—	—	—
1984–85	Oyster Bay Gulls	NYJHL	—	—	—	—	—	—	—	—	—	—	—	—	—	—	—	—	—
1985–86	Boston College	HE	7	4	0	1	312	18	0	3.46	—	—	—	—	—	—	—	—	—
1986–87	Boston College	HE	21	15	5	0	1182	68	0	3.45	—	—	—	—	—	—	—	—	—
1987–88	Boston College	HE	30	11	16	2	1726	116	0	4.03	—	—	—	—	—	—	—	—	—
1988–89	Boston College	HE	32	19	9	4	1945	107	0	3.30	—	—	—	—	—	—	—	—	—
1989–90	Rochester Americans	AHL	14	5	6	1	681	37	0	3.26	.879	1	—	—	—	—	—	—	—
1989–90	Phoenix Roadrunners	IHL	18	8	7	2	1047	64	0	3.67	—	—	—	—	—	—	—	—	—
1990–91	Buffalo Sabres	NHL	1	0	0	0	36	3	0	5.04	.833	—	—	—	—	—	—	—	—
1990–91	Rochester Americans	AHL	56	33	13	5	3155	160	3	3.04	.882	8	4	2	378	16	0	2.54	—
1991–92	Buffalo Sabres	NHL	1	0	1	0	60	4	0	4.00	.862	—	—	—	—	—	—	—	—
1991–92	Rochester Americans	AHL	60	28	20	9	3498	172	3	2.95	.901	15	8	7	879	43	1	2.94	.901
1992–93	Tampa Bay Lightning	NHL	1	0	1	0	46	7	0	9.24	.667	—	—	—	—	—	—	—	—
1992–93	Atlanta Knights	IHL	44	23	12	4	2390	134	0	3.36	.879	3	1	2	178	8	0	2.70	.879
1993–94	Providence Bruins	AHL	25	10	11	3	1385	83	0	3.60	.889	—	—	—	—	—	—	—	—
1993–94	Fredericton Canadiens	AHL	16	8	7	0	872	63	0	4.33	.870	—	—	—	—	—	—	—	—
1994–95	Richmond Renegades	ECHL	8	4	2	0	346	13	1	2.25	.910	17	12	4	953	37	3	2.33	—
1995–96	Los Angeles Ice Dogs	IHL	43	17	16	5	2245	145	1	3.88	.871	—	—	—	—	—	—	—	—
1996–97	San Antonio Dragons	IHL	45	20	16	5	2437	138	2	3.40	.901	4	1	3	230	11	0	2.87	.924
1997–98	Orlando Solar Bears	IHL	44	21	13	6	2303	102	0	2.66	.914	16	8	8	966	48	1	2.98	.892
1998–99	Orlando Solar Bears	IHL	55	32	17	1	2981	144	2	2.90	.900	2	0	0	46	4	0	5.22	.810
1999–00	Orlando Solar Bears	IHL	2	1	1	0	119	7	0	3.52	.879	—	—	—	—	—	—	—	—
NHL totals			3	0	2	0	142	14	0	5.95	.794	—	—	—	—	—	—	—	—

=== International ===
Year	Team	Event	GP	W	L	T	MIN	GA	SO	GAA	SV%
1994	United States	WC	1	0	1	0	45	6	0	8.00	.818
Senior totals			1	0	1	0	45	6	0	8.00	.818

== Awards and honors ==
Award	Year
All-Hockey East Second Team	1987–88
All-Hockey East First Team	1988–89
AHCA East Second-Team All-American	1988–89

Awards and achievements
Preceded by Jean-Claude Bergeron and Andre Racicot	Winner of the Hap Holmes Memorial Award; 1990–91 (with Darcy Wakaluk); 1991–92	Succeeded by Corey Hirsch and Boris Rousson
Preceded by Scott King	Hockey East Goaltending Champion; 1988–89	Succeeded by Scott King
