= Hockey East Goaltending Champion =

American college ice hockey award

- Sport: Ice hockey
- Awarded for: To the goaltender with the lowest goals against average (GAA) in conference games during the season

History
- First award: 1985
- Most recent: Jacob Fowler (1.62 GAA) (Boston College)

The Hockey East Goaltending Champion is an annual award given out at the conclusion of the Hockey East regular season, typically to the goaltender who holds the lowest goals against average (GAA) in conference games during the regular season.

The Goaltending Champion was first awarded in 1985 and every year thereafter.

The current record for lowest GAA against conference opponents in a season is held by Jimmy Howard of Maine with a 1.15 goals against average, set during the 2003–04 season.

Seven players have won the award multiple times, with Scott King winning three times. The others, Derek Heriofsky, Michel Larocque, Ty Conklin, Matti Kaltainen, Cayden Primeau and Devon Levi, won twice. King, Larocque, Primeau and Levi each won in consecutive years.

In recent years, the title has occasionally been awarded based on overall merit rather than on statistics. This has occurred three times, the first in 2016–17 to Collin Delia of Merrimack, who held the highest save percentage in conference games (.928%) rather than the lowest GAA. Similarly, it was awarded to Jeremy Swayman of Maine in 2019–20 for his conference-leading .934% save percentage. In 2020–21, Spencer Knight of Boston College was awarded the title with a .937% mark, which was tied for the top save percentage in conference games with Filip Lindberg of Massachusetts. However, Knight played nearly double the minutes and had the highest winning percentage in conference games in the league.

== Award winners ==
Year	Winner	School	GAA
1984–85	Chris Terreri	Providence	3.49
1985–86	Scott Gordon	Boston College	3.42
1986–87	Scott King	Maine	3.06
1987–88	Scott King	Maine	2.97
1988–89	David Littman	Boston College	3.04
1989–90	Scott King	Maine	2.35
1990–91	Scott LaGrand	Boston College	3.02
1991–92	Derek Herlofsky	Boston University	2.45
1992–93	Garth Snow	Maine	2.01
1993–94	Derek Herlofsky	Boston University	2.27
1994–95	Blair Allison	Maine	2.72
1995–96	Tom Noble	Boston University	2.89
1996–97	Michel Larocque	Boston University	2.57
1997–98	Michel Larocque	Boston University	1.74
1998–99	Ty Conklin	New Hampshire	1.64
1999–00	Scott Clemmensen	Boston College	1.98
2000–01	Ty Conklin	New Hampshire	1.83
2001–02	Mike Ayers	New Hampshire	1.79
2002–03	Matti Kaltiainen	Boston College	2.20
2003–04	Jimmy Howard	Maine	1.15

Year	Winner	School	GAA
2004–05	Matti Kaltiainen	Boston College	1.81
2005–06	Cory Schneider	Boston College	1.96
2006–07	John Curry	Boston University	1.85
2007–08	Kevin Regan	New Hampshire	1.83
2008–09	Brad Thiessen	Northeastern	2.09
2009–10	Carter Hutton	UMass Lowell	2.35
2010–11	John Muse	Boston College	1.84
2011–12	Parker Milner	Boston College	1.85
2012–13	Connor Hellebuyck	UMass Lowell	1.38
2013–14	Thatcher Demko	Boston College	1.35
2014–15	Jon Gillies	Providence	1.74
2015–16	Kevin Boyle	UMass Lowell	1.80
2016–17	Collin Delia	Merrimack	2.21
2017–18	Cayden Primeau	Northeastern	1.79
2018–19	Cayden Primeau	Northeastern	2.12
2019–20	Jeremy Swayman	Maine	2.27
2020–21	Spencer Knight	Boston College	1.99
2021–22	Devon Levi	Northeastern	1.64
2022–23	Devon Levi	Northeastern	1.81
2023–24	Jacob Fowler	Boston College	2.20
2024–25	Jacob Fowler	Boston College	1.62

=== Winners by school ===
School	Winners
Boston College	13
Maine	7
Boston University	6
Northeastern	5
New Hampshire	4
UMass Lowell	3
Providence	2
Merrimack	1

== See also ==
- Hockey East Awards
