= Spencer Knight =

American ice hockey player (born 2001)

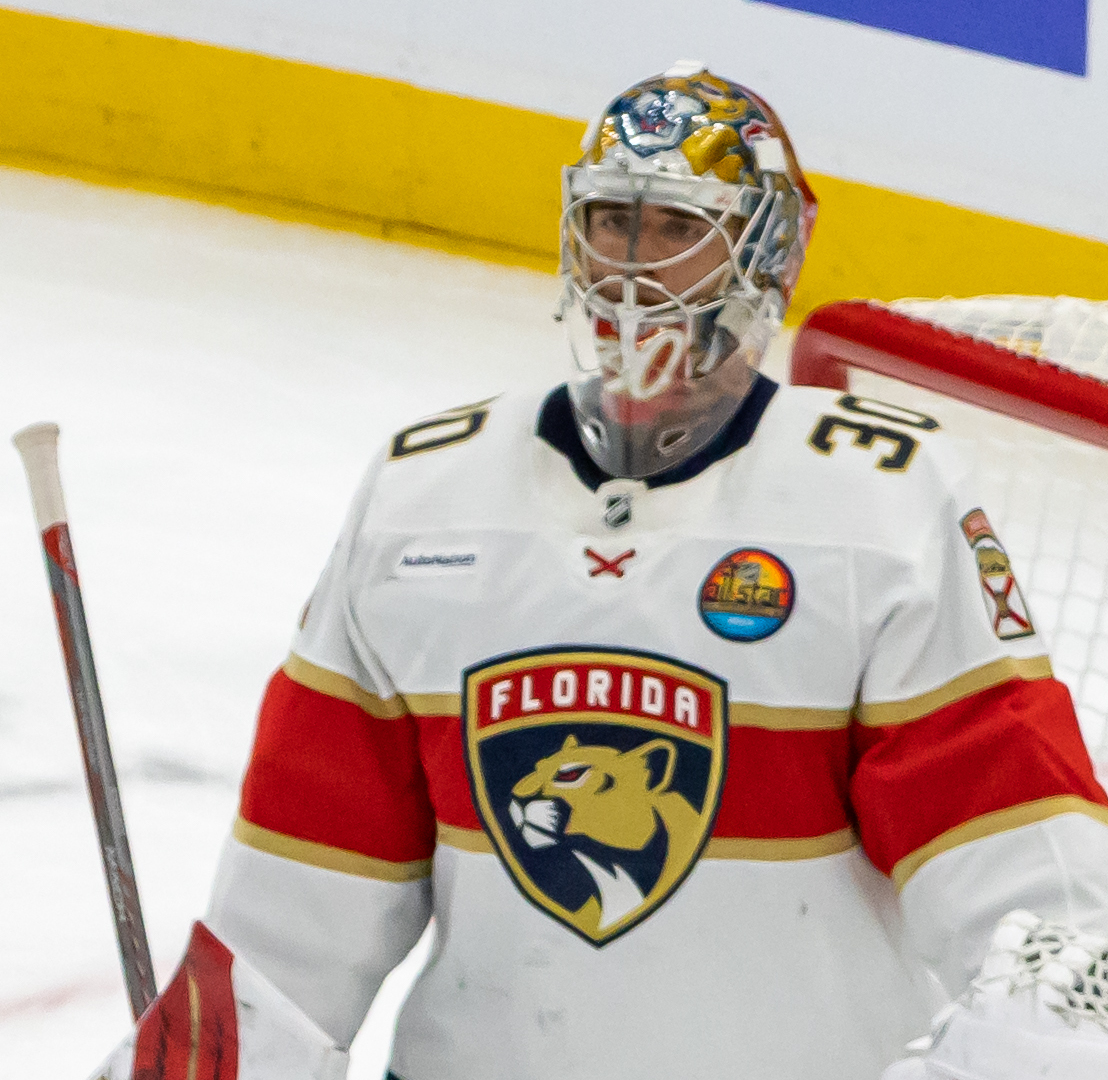
- Knight with the Florida Panthers in 2022
- Born: April 19, 2001 (age 25) Darien, Connecticut, U.S.
- Height: 6 ft 3 in (191 cm)
- Weight: 191 lb (87 kg; 13 st 9 lb)
- Position: Goaltender
- Catches: Left
- NHL team Former teams: Chicago Blackhawks; Florida Panthers
- NHL draft: 13th overall, 2019; Florida Panthers
- Playing career: 2021–present

Spencer Knight (born April 19, 2001) is an American professional ice hockey player who is a goaltender for the Chicago Blackhawks of the National Hockey League (NHL). The Florida Panthers selected him in the first round, 13th overall, of the 2019 NHL entry draft.

Born and raised in Darien, Connecticut, Knight became a goaltender after watching Henrik Lundqvist play for the New York Rangers. He spent one year at Darien High School and another at Avon Old Farms before joining the USA Hockey National Team Development Program in 2018. After setting a program record by winning 59 games in two seasons, Knight, who was the first goaltender to be drafted by the Panthers in the first round, played college ice hockey for the Boston College Eagles. In his sophomore year with Boston College, he was named both the Hockey East Goaltending Champion and the Player of the Year, and he was a two-time finalist for the Mike Richter Award.

Knight left Boston College in 2021 to join the Panthers for the end of their 2020–21 season. He debuted with the team the day after his 20th birthday, becoming the first goaltender born in the 21st century to play in the NHL. Although he made 36 saves in his playoff debut, the Panthers were eliminated from the 2021 Stanley Cup playoffs by the Tampa Bay Lightning in the first round. Knight started the 2021–22 season as part of a goaltending tandem with Sergei Bobrovsky, but Bobrovsky's strong performance and Knight's unevenness led him to become a backup as the season progressed.

== Early life ==
Knight was born on April 19, 2001, in Darien, Connecticut, to Chris and Lilly Knight. He began playing ice hockey at the age of two, and he started playing as a goaltender when he was ten years old. A fan of the New York Rangers of the National Hockey League, Knight was partially motivated to goaltend by watching Henrik Lundqvist. He attended Darien High School for one year before transferring to Avon Old Farms, where he became the hockey team's starting goaltender in his first season. Playing alongside Trevor Zegras, Knight posted a 1.89 goals against average (GAA) and .935 save percentage (SV%) at Avon in 22 games as a sophomore. Knight had also played with Zegras on the Mid Fairfield Rangers, a Tier 1 youth hockey team in Stamford, Connecticut, on both their 14U and 16U AAA teams, then at Avon Old Farms, and then later at the NTDP.

Knight left Avon Old Farms after the 2016–17 season to join the USA Hockey National Team Development Program (NTDP) in Michigan. In his first season with the team, Knight went 27–6–0 in 39 games, with a .911 SV%, 2.56 GAA, and one shutout. The following year, he posted a 32–4–1 record, 2.36 GAA, .913 SV%, and two shutouts in 39 games. In 78 games with the NTDP, Knight set the program record with 59 wins across two seasons.

== Playing career ==
=== College ===
Going into the 2019 NHL entry draft, the NHL Central Scouting Bureau ranked Knight the No. 1 available goaltender in North America. The Florida Panthers selected him 13th overall, the first time they had taken a goaltender in the first round of the NHL draft, and he was the highest-drafted goaltender of any team since the Dallas Stars selected Jack Campbell 11th overall in the 2010 NHL entry draft. Before joining the Panthers, however, Knight attended Boston College to play hockey for the Eagles.

Knight made his college hockey debut and recorded his first win in the Eagles' opening-night win over Wisconsin. Boston College won the game 5–3, with Knight making 23 saves in the process. After posting a 1.12 GAA and .959 SV% in November, he was named the Hockey East Rookie of the Month. This was followed by a Hockey East Goaltender of the Month honor in December, when he finished the month on a nine-game winning streak. In 15 starts by the end of December, Knight led the conference with four shutouts and was second with a .940 SV% and 1.73 GAA. The Eagles won the Hockey East regular-season title with their 4–1 defeat of rival Boston University on February 29, 2020. Knight made 30 saves to help Boston College to their victory. Boston College would have entered the 2020 Hockey East Men's Ice Hockey Tournament as the No. 1 seed, but the tournament was cancelled due to concerns over the emergent COVID-19 pandemic. Knight finished his freshman season with a 23–8–2 record, .931 SV%, and 1.97 GAA, and he was a finalist for the Mike Richter Award. Although the award ultimately went to Jeremy Swayman of the Maine Black Bears, Knight was named to both the Hockey East All-Rookie Team and the Second All-Star Team.

Knight and his teammate Matt Boldy both received Hockey East Player of the Week Honors for their two-game sweep of the Providence Friars on December 4 and 5, 2020. Knight shut out the Friars in both games, stopping all 66 shots that he faced in the series. He was named the Hockey East Goaltender of the Month as a combined award for November and December after beginning the season 4–0–0 with a .955 SV% and 1.50 GAA. He finished the season with a 15–2–1 record in 18 starts, accompanied by a .937 SV% and 1.99 GAA. Hockey East named Knight both a First Team All-Star and their 2021 Goaltender of the Year. He was also named the Hockey East Player of the Year, becoming the first goaltender to win the award since Thatcher Demko in 2016. A finalist for both the Mike Richter Award and the Hobey Baker Award, the American Hockey Coaches Association named Knight a Division I All-American. Despite making a season-high 43 saves in Boston College's semifinal game against UMass Lowell in the semifinal rounds of the 2021 Hockey East Men's Ice Hockey Tournament, Boston College lost the game 6–5 in double overtime. The Eagles advanced to the 2021 NCAA Division I Men's Ice Hockey Tournament, where they lost 4–1 to St. Cloud State in the Northeast Regional Finals. Knight made 32 saves, but the Huskies outshot the Eagles 36–27 to win the game. After the Eagles' 2020–21 season came to a close, Knight agreed to finish his college career to sign with the Panthers. He finished his career with a 39–12–3 record, a 2.05 GAA, and eight shutouts in 54 starts.

=== Professional ===
==== Florida Panthers (2021–2025) ====
Knight signed a three-year, entry-level contract with the Panthers on March 31, 2021, joining the team for the remainder of the 2020–21 season. He made his NHL debut on April 20, 2021, and made 33 saves on 34 shots of the Panthers' 5–1 victory over the Columbus Blue Jackets. In addition to becoming the youngest goaltender to record a win for the Panthers, he was the first in franchise history to win his debut game. Debuting the day after his 20th birthday, Knight was the first goaltender born in the 21st century to appear in an NHL game. He made four regular-season appearances with the Panthers, winning all of them and posting a .919 SV% and 2.32 GAA. In doing so, he became the youngest goaltender in NHL history to begin his career 4–0. The Panthers entered the 2021 Stanley Cup playoffs facing the Tampa Bay Lightning. Facing elimination in Game 5 of the best-of-seven series, coach Joel Quenneville gave Knight the start over Sergei Bobrovsky and Chris Driedger. He allowed a goal on the first shot of the game, from Blake Coleman, but made 36 saves to win the game 4–1 for Florida. At 20 years and 35 days of age, Knight was the second-youngest NHL goaltender to win his playoff debut, following Don Beaupre, who was 19 years and 202 days old when he won for the Minnesota North Stars in the 1981 Stanley Cup playoffs. The Panthers were eliminated from the playoffs in the next game with a 4–0 shutout loss. Knight allowed three goals, with Alex Killorn scoring the fourth on an empty net.

The Panthers lost Driedger to the Seattle Kraken in the 2021 NHL expansion draft, and so they entered the 2021–22 season with a goaltending tandem of Bobrovsky and Knight. Florida opened the season 10–0–1, with Knight posting a .918 SV% and 2.51 GAA in his first five starts. Knight's playing time decreased as the season progressed, both due to inconsistent performances on his end and due to Bobrovsky's resurgence. On January 29, 2022, the Panthers sent Knight to the Charlotte Checkers, their American Hockey League (AHL) affiliate, to "keep his cadence" and continue to receive playing time through the NHL All-Star Game break. He spent all of February in Charlotte, going 7–3–0 with a .917 SV% before he was recalled to Florida on March 6. After going 6–1–0 with a 2.16 GAA and .925 SV% in seven games that month, including a shutout, Knight was named the NHL Rookie of the Month for April 2022. In 32 games during his sophomore NHL season, Knight finished with a 19–9–3 record, a .908 SV%, and a 2.79 GAA. He entered the 2022 Stanley Cup playoffs as a backup to Bobrovsky, not appearing at all in the Panthers' first-round series against the Washington Capitals.

On September 27, 2022, Knight signed a three-year contract extension with the Panthers.

In February 2023, Knight entered the NHL Player Assistance Program to receive care for his battle with Obsessive Compulsive Disorder (OCD).

==== Chicago Blackhawks (2025–present) ====
On March 1, 2025, the Panthers traded Knight and a conditional first-round pick in the 2026 NHL entry draft to the Chicago Blackhawks in exchange for Seth Jones and a fourth-round pick in the 2026 draft. In Chicago, Knight joined a goaltending corps that included Arvid Söderblom, Petr Mrázek, and an injured Laurent Brossoit, though it soon became a tandem as Mrázek was traded to the Detroit Red Wings shortly after. On March 3, in his first game with the Blackhawks, Knight made 41 saves on 42 shots in a 5–1 win over the Los Angeles Kings.

On September 13, 2025, Knight, going into the final season of his contract, signed a three-year $17.5 million extension to remain with the Blackhawks.

== International play ==
Medal record

Ice hockey

Representing United States

World Junior Championship
Gold medal – first place	2021 Canada	

IIHF World U18 Championship
Bronze medal – third place	2019 Sweden	

Knight won a bronze medal with the NTDP at the 2019 IIHF World U18 Championships in Sweden. He had a 1.51 GAA and .936 SV% in six tournament games, winning five and losing to the Russian team in a semifinal round shootout. That same year, he traveled to the 2019 World Junior Ice Hockey Championships with the silver medalist USA junior team as their third goaltender.

After not receiving any playing time in the 2019 tournament, Knight hoped to play a larger role for the United States team at the 2020 World Junior Ice Hockey Championships. The team was eliminated in the quarterfinals after a 1–0 loss to Finland, but Knight personally played well, with two wins, a 2.49 GAA, and .913 SV% in the four games in which he appeared. Following his team's early elimination in 2020, Knight and the United States won gold at the 2021 World Junior Ice Hockey Championships, shutting out Canada 2–0 in the championship match. Knight finished the tournament with a 5–1–0 record, 1.63 GAA, .940 SV%, and three shutouts, and Team USA named him the Player of the Game for the gold medal match.

== Personal life ==
Knight has obsessive–compulsive disorder (OCD). He began experiencing symptoms in 2019, during his first year at Boston College, and has been managing the disorder with an expert since 2023.

== Career statistics ==
Information on career statistics derived from Elite Prospects.

=== Regular season and playoffs ===
			Regular season									Playoffs
Season	Team	League	GP	W	L	OT	MIN	GA	SO	GAA	SV%	GP	W	L	MIN	GA	SO	GAA	SV%
2017–18	U.S. National Development Team	USHL	19	13	4	0	982	52	0	3.18	.902	—	—	—	—	—	—	—	—
2018–19	U.S. National Development Team	USHL	16	15	1	0	841	31	1	2.21	.903	—	—	—	—	—	—	—	—
2019–20	Boston College	HE	33	23	8	2	1,979	65	5	1.97	.931	—	—	—	—	—	—	—	—
2020–21	Boston College	HE	21	16	4	1	1,296	47	3	2.18	.932	—	—	—	—	—	—	—	—
2020–21	Florida Panthers	NHL	4	4	0	0	207	8	0	2.32	.919	2	1	1	116	4	0	2.06	.933
2021–22	Florida Panthers	NHL	32	19	9	3	1,740	81	2	2.79	.908	—	—	—	—	—	—	—	—
2021–22	Charlotte Checkers	AHL	11	7	4	0	611	30	2	2.95	.905	—	—	—	—	—	—	—	—
2022–23	Florida Panthers	NHL	21	9	8	3	1,169	62	1	3.18	.901	—	—	—	—	—	—	—	—
2022–23	Charlotte Checkers	AHL	2	1	1	0	120	4	1	2.00	.918	—	—	—	—	—	—	—	—
2023–24	Charlotte Checkers	AHL	45	25	14	5	2,584	104	5	2.41	.905	2	1	1	128	4	0	1.87	.925
2024–25	Florida Panthers	NHL	23	12	8	1	1,298	52	2	2.40	.907	—	—	—	—	—	—	—	—
2024–25	Chicago Blackhawks	NHL	15	5	8	2	904	47	0	3.12	.896	—	—	—	—	—	—	—	—
2025–26	Chicago Blackhawks	NHL	55	19	25	11	3,293	155	3	2.82	.902	—	—	—	—	—	—	—	—
NHL totals			150	68	58	20	8,612	405	8	2.83	.903	2	1	1	116	4	0	2.06	.933

=== International ===
Year	Team	Event	Results	GP	W	L	T	MIN	GA	SO	GAA	SV%
2019	United States	U18	3rd place, bronze medalist(s)	6	5	1	0	357	9	1	1.51	.936
2020	United States	WJC	6th	4	2	2	0	241	10	0	2.49	.913
2021	United States	WJC	1st place, gold medalist(s)	7	6	1	0	332	9	3	1.63	.940
Junior totals				17	19	5	0	930	28	4	1.87	.930

== Awards and honors ==
Award	Year
College	
Hockey East All-Rookie Team	2020
Hockey East Second All-Star Team	2020
Hockey East First All-Star Team	2021
Hockey East Goaltending Champion	2021
Hockey East Player of the Year	2021
AHCA Division I All-American	2021
AHL	
Fred T. Hunt Memorial Award	2024
NHL	
Rookie of the Month	April 2022
Stanley Cup Chanpion	

Awards and achievements
Preceded by Grigori Denisenko	Florida Panthers first-round draft pick 2019	Succeeded by Anton Lundell
Preceded by Jeremy Swayman	Hockey East Player of the Year; 2020–21	Succeeded by Bobby Trivigno
Preceded by Jeremy Swayman	Hockey East Goaltending Champion; 2020–21	Succeeded by Devon Levi
