= 2018–19 Boston College Eagles men's ice hockey season =

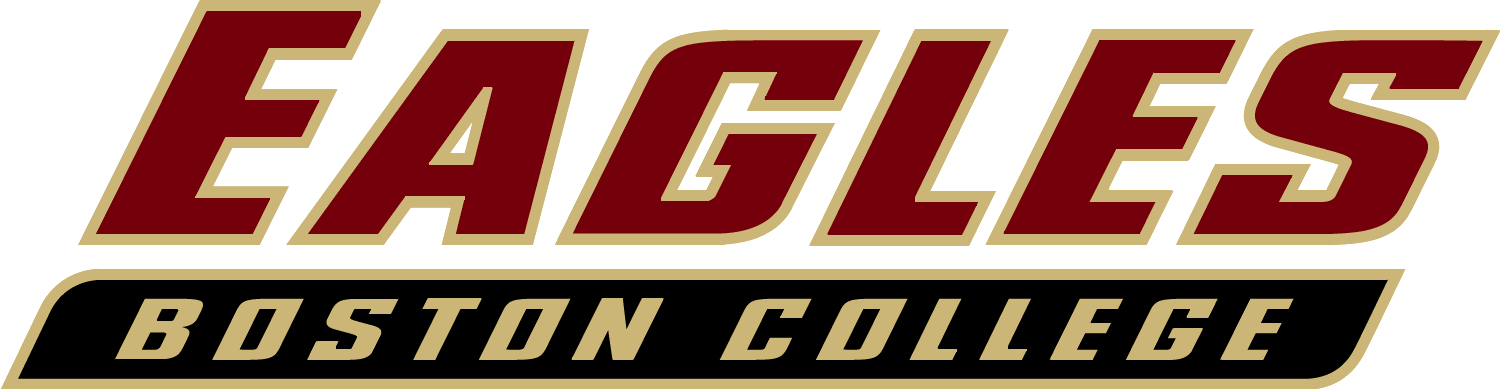
- Conference: 7th Hockey East
- Home ice: Kelley Rink

Rankings
- USCHO.com/CBS College Sports: RV (Final)
- USA Today/USA Hockey Magazine: NR (Final)

Record
- Overall: 14–22–3 (10–11–3)
- Home: 7–5–2
- Road: 5–15–1
- Neutral: 2–2–0

Coaches and captains
- Head coach: Jerry York
- Assistant coaches: Mike Ayers; Brendan Buckley; Marty McInnis
- Captain(s): Casey Fitzgerald; Michael Kim; Christopher Brown

The 2018–19 Boston College Eagles men's ice hockey team represented Boston College in the 2018–19 NCAA Division I men's ice hockey season. The team was coached by Jerry York, '67, his twenty-fifth season behind the bench at Boston College. The Eagles played their home games at Kelley Rink on the campus of Boston College, competing in Hockey East.

The Eagles competed in just one mid-season tournament during the 2018–19 season, forgoing the traditional holiday break tournament. The Eagles played in the 67th Annual Beanpot Tournament at the TD Garden in Boston, Massachusetts, on February 4 and 11. Boston College defeated Harvard in the opening round by a score of 2–1, but fell to the defending champion Northeastern Huskies in the championship game, 4–2. The Eagles failed to secure the Beanpot title, but ended their two-season streak of finishing fourth in the tournament.

The Eagles finished the season 14–22–3, and 10-11-3 in conference play, seventh in Hockey East; their lowest finish since placing 6th in 2008–09. They advanced to the title game of the Hockey East tournament, however, they fell to the Northeastern Huskies by a score of 3–2. The Eagles failed to secure a bid to the NCAA Tournament, their third consecutive season missing the national tournament.

== Previous season recap ==
The Eagles entered the 2018–19 season following a second consecutive semi-disappointing year. While earning the Hockey East regular season title with their strong 20–14–3 record, they missed out on participating in the NCAA Tournament for the second year in a row; the first time missing consecutive years since 1998. Additionally, they failed to secure any mid-season tournament title, placing fourth in both the inaugural Ice Vegas Invitational Tournament and in the Beanpot tournament.

== Departures ==
Three Eagles departed from the program from the 2017–18 roster:

Graduation:

- Kevin Lohan, Senior – D

Not Retained:

- Mike Booth, Sophomore – F
- Casey Carreau, Freshman – F

Additionally, long-time Associate Head Coach Greg Brown left the program to become the Assistant Coach for the New York Rangers of the NHL. Boston College alum and formerly assistant coach at Connecticut, Brendan Buckley was hired to fill the position.

== Recruiting ==
Boston College added five freshmen for the 2018–19 season: four forwards, and one defensemen.

Player	Position	Nationality	Notes
Jack McBain	Forward	Canada	Toronto, Ontario; Drafted 63rd overall by the Minnesota Wild in the 2018 Draft.
Oliver Wahlstrom	Forward	United States	Quincy, MA; Drafted 11th overall by the New York Islanders in the 2018 Draft.
Adam Samuelsson	Defenseman	United States	San Diego, CA; Played for the US-NTDP of the USHL.
Patrick Giles	Forward	United States	Chevy Chase, MD; Played for the US-NTDP of the USHL.
Marc McLaughlin	Forward	United States	North Billerica, MA; Played for the Cedar Rapids RoughRiders of the USHL.

== 2018–2019 roster ==
=== 2018–19 Eagles ===
As of October 8, 2018.

No.	Nat.	Player	Class	Pos	Height	Weight	DoB	Hometown	Previous team	NHL rights
2		Michael Karow	Sophomore	D	6' 2" (1.88 m)	200 lb (91 kg)	1998-12-18	Green Bay, Wisconsin	Youngstown (USHL)	ARI, 126th overall 2017
3		Luke McInnis	Junior	D	5' 11" (1.8 m)	175 lb (79 kg)	1998-07-29	Hingham, Massachusetts	Youngstown (USHL)	—
4		Michael Kim (C)	Senior	D	6' 0" (1.83 m)	200 lb (91 kg)	1995-06-28	Toronto, Ontario	Boston Jr. Bruins (USPHL)	—
5		Casey Fitzgerald (C)	Senior	D	5' 11" (1.8 m)	185 lb (84 kg)	1997-02-25	North Reading, Massachusetts	USNTDP (USHL)	BUF, 86th overall 2016
6		Ben Finkelstein	Junior	D	5' 10" (1.78 m)	185 lb (84 kg)	1997-10-01	Burlington, Vermont	Waterloo (USHL)	FLA, 195th overall 2016
7		Connor Moore	Junior	D	5' 10" (1.78 m)	175 lb (79 kg)	1997-07-04	Cumming, Georgia	Youngstown (USHL)	—
8		Jesper Mattila	Junior	D	5' 11" (1.8 m)	184 lb (83 kg)	1997-10-09	Tampere, Finland	Ilves U20 (Nuorten SM-liiga)	—
9		Logan Hutsko	Sophomore	F	5' 10" (1.78 m)	165 lb (75 kg)	1999-02-11	Tampa, Florida	USNTDP (USHL)	FLA, 89th overall 2018
10		Christopher Brown (C)	Senior	F	6' 0" (1.83 m)	190 lb (86 kg)	1996-02-22	Bloomfield Hills, Michigan	Tri-City (USHL)	BUF, 151st overall 2014
11		Jack McBain	Freshman	F	6' 3" (1.91 m)	195 lb (88 kg)	2000-01-06	Toronto, Ontario	Toronto Jr. Canadiens (OJHL)	MIN, 63rd overall 2018
14		Zach Walker	Junior	F	6' 1" (1.85 m)	200 lb (91 kg)	1998-08-02	Boise, Idaho	USNTDP (USHL)	—
15		J. D. Dudek	Senior	F	6' 0" (1.83 m)	195 lb (88 kg)	1996-01-29	Auburn, New Hampshire	Chicago (USHL)	EDM, 152nd overall 2014
17		David Cotton	Junior	F	6' 3" (1.91 m)	204 lb (93 kg)	1997-07-09	Parker, Texas	Waterloo (USHL)	CAR, 169th overall 2015
18		Oliver Wahlstrom	Freshman	F	6' 1" (1.85 m)	204 lb (93 kg)	2000-06-13	Quincy, Massachusetts	USNTDP (USHL)	NYI, 11th overall 2018
19		Jacob Tortora	Sophomore	F	5' 8" (1.73 m)	162 lb (73 kg)	1999-07-25	Victor, New York	USNTDP (USHL)	—
20		Mike Merulla	Junior	F	6' 0" (1.83 m)	194 lb (88 kg)	1996-01-26	Kennett Square, Pennsylvania	Aston (NAHL)	—
21		Christopher Grando	Sophomore	F	5' 10" (1.78 m)	165 lb (75 kg)	1998-08-22	Islip, New York	Green Bay (USHL)	—
22		Aapeli Räsänen	Sophomore	F	6' 0" (1.83 m)	196 lb (89 kg)	1998-06-01	Tampere, Finland	Sioux City (USHL)	EDM, 153rd overall 2016
23		Adam Samuelsson	Freshman	D	6' 6" (1.98 m)	240 lb (109 kg)	2000-06-21	San Diego, California	USNTDP (USHL)	—
24		Patrick Giles	Freshman	F	6' 4" (1.93 m)	202 lb (92 kg)	2000-01-03	Chevy Chase, Maryland	USNTDP (USHL)	—
25		Marc McLaughlin	Freshman	F	6' 0" (1.83 m)	181 lb (82 kg)	1999-07-26	North Billerica, Massachusetts	Cedar Rapids (USHL)	—
26		Julius Mattila	Junior	F	5' 11" (1.8 m)	170 lb (77 kg)	1997-10-09	Tampere, Finland	Ilves U20 (Nuorten SM-liiga)	—
27		Graham McPhee	Junior	F	6' 1" (1.85 m)	174 lb (79 kg)	1998-07-24	Bethesda, Maryland	USNTDP (USHL)	EDM, 149th overall 2016
28		Ron Greco	Junior	F	5' 10" (1.78 m)	175 lb (79 kg)	1995-03-20	Philadelphia, Pennsylvania	Philadelphia (USPHL)	—
29		Ian Milosz	Senior	G	6' 7" (2.01 m)	214 lb (97 kg)	1995-05-08	North Grafton, Massachusetts	Boston Jr. Bruins (USPHL)	—
31		Joseph Woll	Junior	G	6' 4" (1.93 m)	202 lb (92 kg)	1998-07-12	St. Louis, Missouri	USNTDP (USHL)	TOR, 62nd overall 2016
35		Ryan Edquist	Junior	G	6' 0" (1.83 m)	171 lb (78 kg)	1998-01-28	Lakeville, Minnesota	Madison (USHL)	—

=== Coaching staff ===
Name	Position	Seasons at Boston College	Alma mater
Jerry York	Head Coach	25	Boston College (1967)
Mike Ayers	Assistant coach	6	University of New Hampshire (2004)
Brendan Buckley	Assistant coach	1	Boston College (1999)
Marty McInnis	Assistant coach	6	Boston College (1992)

== Standings ==
2018–19 Hockey East Standings
	Conference record							Overall record					
	GP	W	L	T	PTS	GF	GA	GP	W	L	T	GF	GA
#2 Massachusetts †	24	18	6	0	36	92	51	41	31	10	0	151	83
#4 Providence	24	14	7	3	31	76	44	42	24	12	6	133	84
#9 Northeastern*	24	15	8	1	31	76	52	39	27	11	1	118	81
#19 Massachusetts–Lowell	24	12	7	5	29	65	55	37	19	13	5	100	85
Boston University	24	12	9	3	27	64	65	38	16	18	4	99	104
Maine	24	11	9	4	26	64	60	36	15	17	4	90	99
Boston College	24	10	11	3	23	62	60	39	14	22	3	90	110
New Hampshire	24	8	10	6	22	55	67	36	12	15	9	90	103
Connecticut	24	7	15	2	16	52	77	34	12	20	2	81	107
Vermont	24	5	16	3	13	41	59	34	12	19	3	72	82
Merrimack	24	4	18	2	10	48	105	34	7	24	3	67	134
Championship: March 23, 2019 † indicates conference regular season champion * indicates conference tournament champion (Lamoriello Trophy); Rankings: USCHO.com Top 20 Poll

== Schedule ==
=== Regular season ===
Date	Time	Opponent^{#}	Rank^{#}	Site	TV	Result	Attendance	Record
Exhibition
October 6	7:00 pm	New Brunswick*	#12	Kelley Rink • Chestnut Hill, Massachusetts		W 8–1	843	0–0–0 (0–0–0)
Regular season
October 12	8:00 pm	at Wisconsin*	#12	Kohl Center • Madison, Wisconsin	FS Wisconsin+	L 0–3	7,911	0–1–0 (0–0–0)
October 13	8:00 pm	at Wisconsin*	#12	Kohl Center • Madison, Wisconsin	BTN+	L 5–7	9,819	0–2–0 (0–0–0)
October 19	7:00 pm	at Quinnipiac*	#18	People's United Center • Hamden, Connecticut	ESPN+	L 0–1	3,625	0–3–0 (0–0–0)
October 25	7:00 pm	#2 St. Cloud State*		Kelley Rink • Chestnut Hill, Massachusetts	ESPN3	L 0–7	3,520	0–4–0 (0–0–0)
November 2	7:00 pm	at Merrimack		Lawler Arena • North Andover, Massachusetts		L 2–1	2,204	0–5–0 (0–1–0)
November 3	7:00 pm	Merrimack		Kelley Rink • Chestnut Hill, Massachusetts	ESPN3	W 4–1	3,291	1–5–0 (1–1–0)
November 8	7:00 pm	Vermont		Kelley Rink • Chestnut Hill, Massachusetts	ESPN3	W 4–1	2,904	2–5–0 (2–1–0)
November 9	7:00 pm	Vermont		Kelley Rink • Chestnut Hill, Massachusetts	ESPN3	W 3–2	3,714	3–5–0 (3–1–0)
November 16	7:00 pm	New Hampshire		Kelley Rink • Chestnut Hill, Massachusetts	ESPN3	T 2–2 ^{OT}	3,019	3–5–1 (3–1–1)
November 23	3:00 pm	Bentley*		Kelley Rink • Chestnut Hill, Massachusetts	ESPN3	L 2–4	4,436	3–6–1 (3–1–1)
November 30	7:30 pm	at Boston University		Agganis Arena • Boston, Massachusetts (Green Line Rivalry)	NESN	W 4–1	6,150	4–6–1 (4–1–1)
December 1	7:00 pm	Boston University		Kelley Rink • Chestnut Hill, Massachusetts (Green Line Rivalry)	ESPN3	T 0–0 ^{OT}	7,328	4–6–2 (4–1–2)
December 6	7:00 pm	at Connecticut		XL Center • Hartford, Connecticut		W 4–0	4,059	5–6–2 (5–1–2)
December 7	7:00 pm	Connecticut		Kelley Rink • Chestnut Hill, Massachusetts	ESPN3	W 3–2	3,063	6–6–2 (6–1–2)
December 31	5:00 pm	at #6 Notre Dame*		Compton Family Ice Arena • South Bend, Indiana (Holy War on Ice)	NBC Chicago	L 0–4	5,330	6–7–2 (6–1–2)
January 4	9:00 pm	at #15 Arizona State*		Oceanside Ice Arena • Tempe, Arizona		L 2–5	921	6–8–2 (6–1–2)
January 5	9:00 pm	at #15 Arizona State*		Gila River Arena • Glendale, Arizona	Pac-12	L 0–2	2,902	6–9–2 (6–1–2)
January 11	7:00 pm	#7 Providence		Kelley Rink • Chestnut Hill, Massachusetts	ESPN3	W 4–2	6,176	7–9–2 (7–1–2)
January 12	7:00 pm	at New Hampshire		Whittemore Center • Durham, New Hampshire	ESPN+	L 4–6	5,256	7–10–2 (7–2–2)
January 16	7:00 pm	Maine		Kelley Rink • Chestnut Hill, Massachusetts	ESPN3	L 2–7	3,361	7–11–2 (7–3–2)
January 19	7:00 pm	#11 Providence		Kelley Rink • Chestnut Hill, Massachusetts	ESPN3	W 4–1	3,419	8–11–2 (8–3–2)
January 25	7:00 pm	#19 UMass Lowell		Kelley Rink • Chestnut Hill, Massachusetts	ESPN3	L 1–3	4,328	8–12–2 (8–4–2)
January 26	7:00 pm	at #19 UMass Lowell		Tsongas Center • Lowell, Massachusetts	NESN	T 4–4 ^{OT}	5,402	8–12–3 (8–4–3)
February 1	7:00 pm	at Connecticut		XL Center • Hartford, Connecticut		W 5–3	5,206	9–12–3 (9–4–3)
February 4	5:00 pm	vs. #17 Harvard*		TD Garden • Boston, Massachusetts (Beanpot)	NESN	W 2–1	12,413	10–12–3 (9–4–3)
February 8	7:15 pm	at #15 UMass Lowell		Tsongas Center • Lowell, Massachusetts	NESN	L 0–3	5,424	10–13–3 (9–5–3)
February 11	7:30 pm	vs. #14 Northeastern*		TD Garden • Boston, Massachusetts (Beanpot)	NESN	L 2–4	15,015	10–14–3 (9–5–3)
February 15	7:00 pm	at #3 Massachusetts		Mullins Center • Amherst, Massachusetts	NESN	L 3–4	7,835	10–15–3 (9–6–3)
February 16	8:00 pm	#3 Massachusetts		Kelley Rink • Chestnut Hill, Massachusetts	ESPN3	L 2–4	7,884	10–16–3 (9–7–3)
February 22	7:00 pm	at Maine		Alfond Arena • Orono, Maine		L 1–2	3,770	10–17–3 (9–8–3)
February 23	7:30 pm	at Maine		Alfond Arena • Orono, Maine	Fox College Sports	L 1–2 ^{OT}	4,348	10–18–3 (9–9–3)
March 1	7:00 pm	#9 Northeastern		Kelley Rink • Chestnut Hill, Massachusetts	ESPN3	W 3–1	5,147	11–18–3 (10–9–3)
March 2	7:00 pm	at #9 Northeastern		Matthews Arena • Boston, Massachusetts		L 2–4	2,414	11–19–3 (10–10–3)
March 7	7:00 pm	at #8 Providence		Schneider Arena • Providence, Rhode Island	NBC Boston	L 1–3	2,533	11–20–3 (10–11–3)
Hockey East Tournament
March 15	7:00 pm	at #7 Providence*		Schneider Arena • Providence, Rhode Island (Quarterfinals)		L 4–5 ^{OT}	1,716	11–21–3 (10–11–3)
March 16	7:00 pm	at #7 Providence*		Schneider Arena • Providence, Rhode Island (Quarterfinals)		W 4–3 ^{OT}	2,142	12–21–3 (10–11–3)
March 17	5:00 pm	at #7 Providence*		Schneider Arena • Providence, Rhode Island (Quarterfinals)		W 2–1	1,740	13–21–3 (10–11–3)
March 22	7:30 pm	vs. #3 Massachusetts*		TD Garden • Boston, Massachusetts (Semifinals)	NESN	W 3–0	11,572	14–21–3 (10–11–3)
March 23	7:00 pm	vs. #6 Northeastern*		TD Garden • Boston, Massachusetts (Finals)	NESN	L 2–3	13,402	14–22–3 (10–11–3)
*Non-conference game. ^{#}Rankings from USCHO.com Poll. All times are in Eastern Time. Attendance data from Hockey East

- On November 17, sophomore Jacob Tortora left the program after dressing in just four games on the season.
- Freshman Oliver Wahlstrom would miss the January 4 and 5 games against Arizona State, representing the United States at the 2019 World Juniors, where he would help the Americans win the silver medal, falling 3–2 in the gold medal game against Finland.
- Defensemen Ben Finklestein was added to the roster on January 11, joining the program as a second-semester Junior. He previously played with the St. Lawrence Saints in the ECAC as well as the Waterloo Black Hawks in the USHL.

== Rankings ==
Poll	Week																										
Poll	Pre	1	2	3	4	5	6	7	8	9	10	11	12	13	14	15	16	17	18	19	20	21	22	23	24	25	Final
USCHO.com	12	12	18	RV	NR	RV	RV	NR	NR	RV	RV	—	—	NR	NR	NR	NR	NR	NR	NR	NR	NR	RV	RV	RV	—	RV
USA Today	9	10	RV	RV	NR	NR	NR	NR	NR	NR	NR	NR	NR	NR	NR	NR	NR	NR	NR	NR	NR	NR	NR	NR	NR	NR	NR

== Statistics ==
=== Skaters ===
No.	Player	POS	YR	GP	G	A	Pts	PIM	PP	SHG	GWG	+/-	SOG
2	Micahel Karow	D	SO	39	0	2	2	18	0	0	0	-3	37
3	Luke McInnis	D	JR	35	0	2	2	30	0	0	0	-11	28
4	Michael Kim	D	SR	39	3	12	15	8	1	1	0	-5	93
5	Casey Fitzgerald	D	SR	39	2	12	14	26	0	0	0	-6	98
6	Ben Finkelstein	D	JR	22	1	9	10	6	1	0	1	-6	35
7	Connor Moore	D	JR	29	1	5	6	12	1	0	0	-1	32
8	Jesper Mattila	D	JR	39	0	9	9	6	0	0	0	-7	35
9	Logan Hutsko	F	SO	36	6	20	26	10	2	0	3	-7	93
10	Chris Brown	F	SR	39	7	9	16	14	2	0	1	-14	54
11	Jack McBain	F	FR	35	6	7	13	39	1	0	1	-3	38
14	Zach Walker	F	JR	22	0	2	2	2	0	0	0	-2	9
15	JD Dudek	F	SR	39	7	5	12	26	0	0	0	-4	63
17	David Cotton	F	JR	39	23	13	36	20	8	1	4	-8	136
18	Oliver Wahlstrom	F	FR	36	8	11	19	28	2	0	1	-6	121
19	Jacob Tortora	F	SO	4	0	2	2	4	0	0	0	E	0
20	Mike Merulla	F	JR	7	0	0	0	0	0	0	0	E	0
21	Christopher Grando	F	SO	37	3	4	7	16	0	0	0	E	32
22	Aapeli Räsänen	F	SO	33	5	2	7	20	1	0	0	-2	40
23	Adam Samuelsson	D	FR	7	0	0	0	0	0	0	0	-1	4
24	Patrick Giles	F	FR	37	1	5	6	14	0	0	0	-2	44
25	Marc McLaughlin	F	FR	39	4	4	8	20	1	0	1	-4	41
26	Julius Mattila	F	JR	34	9	14	23	6	2	1	2	E	84
27	Graham McPhee	F	JR	29	3	6	9	25	2	0	0	-7	40
28	Ron Greco	F	JR	25	1	1	2	0	0	0	0	-6	14
29	Ian Milosz	G	SR	1	0	0	0	0	0	0	0	1	0
31	Joe Woll	G	JR	37	0	0	0	6	0	0	0	-7	0
35	Ryan Edquist	G	JR	3	0	0	0	0	0	0	0	-7	0
	Bench							8					
	Team			39	90	156	246	364	24	3	14	-18	1171

=== Goaltenders ===
No.	Player	YR	GS	GP	MIN	W	L	T	GA	GAA	SA	SV	SV%	SO
29	Ian Milosz	SR	1	0	6:09	0	0	0	0	0.00	2	2	1.00	0
31	Joe Woll	JR	37	37	2189:51	13	21	3	88	2.41	1091	1003	0.919	3
35	Ryan Edquist	JR	3	2	141:23	1	1	0	12	5.09	77	65	0.844	0
	Empty Net			22	23:40				10		10			
	Team		39	39	2361:03	14	22	3	110	2.80	1180	1070	0.907	3

== Awards and honors ==
ACHA/CCM Division I East All-Stars

- David Cotton, F – Second Team

Hockey East All-Stars

- David Cotton, F – First Team
- Casey Fitzgerald, D – Honorable Mention

Hockey East Player of the Month

- David Cotton, F – Month of November

Hockey East Goaltender of the Month

- Joseph Woll, G – Month of December

Hockey East Player of the Week

- David Cotton, F – Week of November 5, 2018
- Julius Mattila, F – Week of December 10, 2018
- Logan Hutsko, F – Week of March 18, 2019 (Shared with Cale Makar)

Hockey East Rookie of the Week

- Oliver Wahlstrom, F – Week of October 8, 2018

Hockey East Defensive Player of the Week

- Joseph Woll, G – Week of December 2, 2018 (Shared with Jeremy Swayman)
