= Cayden Primeau =

American ice hockey player (born 1999)

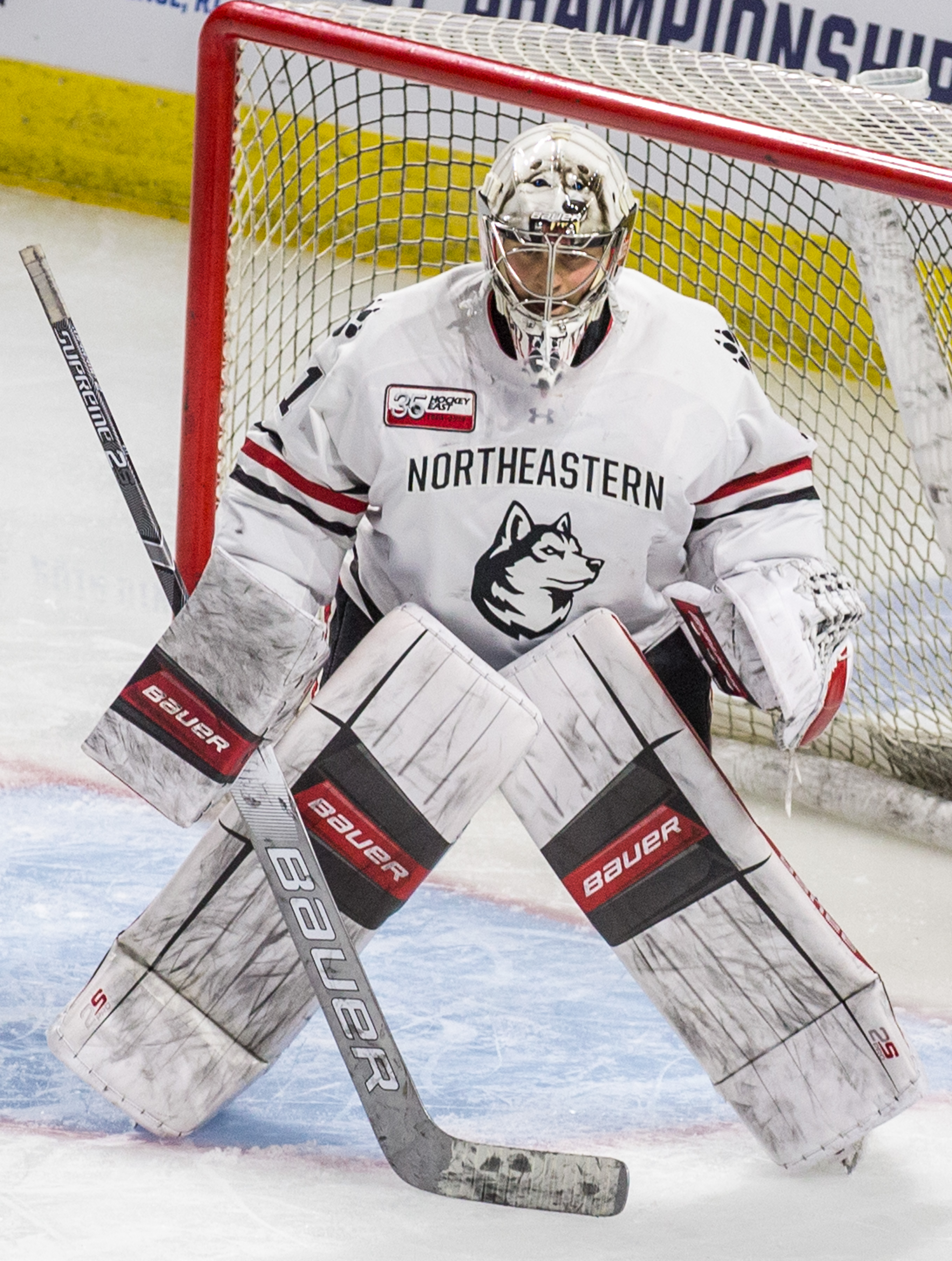
- Primeau with the Northeastern Huskies in 2019
- Born: August 11, 1999 (age 27) Farmington Hills, Michigan, U.S.
- Height: 6 ft 3 in (191 cm)
- Weight: 205 lb (93 kg; 14 st 9 lb)
- Position: Goaltender
- Catches: Left
- NHL team (P) Cur. team Former teams: Carolina Hurricanes; Chicago Wolves (AHL); Montreal Canadiens; Toronto Maple Leafs
- NHL draft: 199th overall, 2017; Montreal Canadiens
- Playing career: 2019–present

Cayden Primeau (born August 11, 1999) is an American professional ice hockey player who is a goaltender for the Chicago Wolves of the American Hockey League (AHL) while under contract to the Carolina Hurricanes of the National Hockey League (NHL). He was selected in the seventh round, 199th overall, by the Montreal Canadiens in the 2017 NHL entry draft. Primeau has also previously played for the Toronto Maple Leafs.

== Playing career ==
=== Early years ===
As a youth, Primeau played with the Philadelphia Revolution of the Eastern Hockey League (EHL), winning both Goaltender of the Year as well as Rookie of the Year honors during the course of the 2015–16 season. Thereafter, he joined the Lincoln Stars of the United States Hockey League (USHL) for a single season where he participated in the annual CCM/USA Hockey All-American Prospects Game, as well as the USHL/NHL Top Prospects Game, recording a shutout at the latter for the first time in the history of the showcase.

=== Collegiate ===
Primeau was stellar during his brief collegiate career with the Northeastern Huskies of the National Collegiate Athletic Association (NCAA). In his freshman season, he posted 19 victories and helped Northeastern jump from eighth to second in the Hockey East conference standings. While the team did not fare well in the postseason, Primeau was named to the All-Hockey East Rookie Team, First Team, and won the conference goaltending title for possessing the lowest goals against average (GAA). The following season, he pushed the Huskies even further, winning a record 25 games for the program and earned Tournament MVP honors whereas Northeastern won their third Hockey East distinction. Despite faltering in the annual NCAA tournament, Primeau was still named an AHCA East First Team All-American and recipient of the Mike Richter Award presented to the best men's goaltender across NCAA Division I ice hockey.

=== Professional ===
Selected by the Montreal Canadiens of the National Hockey League (NHL) in the seventh round (199th overall) of the 2017 NHL entry draft, Primeau ended his college career following his sophomore season and signed an entry-level contract with the Canadiens on March 31, 2019. He was immediately assigned to Montreal's American Hockey League (AHL) affiliate, the Laval Rocket. Primeau was recalled from Laval on December 5, 2019 and made his NHL debut against the Colorado Avalanche the same day, stopping 32 of 35 shots in a 3–2 loss. Shortly thereafter, he registered his first career NHL win in a 3–2 overtime effort versus the Ottawa Senators on December 11.

Playing primarily for Laval over the course of the 2021–22 and 2022–23 campaigns, the Canadiens began the 2023–24 season with three goaltenders on their active roster: Jake Allen, Sam Montembeault, and Primeau, with the latter no longer exempt from waivers and thus unable to be reassigned to the AHL ranks without the possibility of being lost to another team. This precipitated discussions about one of the three netminders being traded. After months of a continuous rotation system, Allen was ultimately dealt to the New Jersey Devils on March 8, 2024, allowing Primeau to assume the role as the Canadiens' primary backup goaltender. Just days later, Primeau would record his second career NHL shutout in a 3–0 win over the Columbus Blue Jackets at the Bell Centre on March 12. With 41 total saves, he would tie Tony Esposito for the franchise record of most saves by a rookie goaltender without allowing a goal established over half a century prior, and was subsequently recognized as the monthly recipient of the Canadiens' Molson Cup award. Primeau finished the 2023–24 season with an 8-9-4 record with both a 2.99 GAA and a .910 save percentage respectively.

Beginning the 2024–25 season in the Canadiens' backup role, Primeau would struggle immensely, resulting in being placed on waivers by Montreal following the annual holiday roster freeze. After going unclaimed, he rejoined Laval in late December. On January 3, 2025, Primeau posted 27 saves in a 2–1 overtime win versus the Abbotsford Canucks, his first AHL game in almost two years. With a record of 8-0-0, along with an 1.73 GAA and a .932 save percentage, he was recognized as the league's Goaltender of the Month for January 2025. Primeau finished the regular season with a 21-2-2 record, subsequently described by the league itself as "the best single-season record in AHL history." He was a co-recipient of the Harry "Hap" Holmes Memorial Award, the Rocket having allowed the fewest goals of any team in the league (tied with the Syracuse Crunch), helping the team to claim the Macgregor Kilpatrick Trophy as AHL regular season champions. Prior to the commencement of Laval's Calder Cup campaign, Primeau was recalled by the Canadiens to once again serve as backup goaltender following an injury to Montembeault during Game 3 of their first round playoff series against the Washington Capitals. Days later, he returned to the Rocket midway through the team's divisional semifinals series against the Cleveland Monsters. He recorded his first AHL playoff shutout on May 25, leading the Rocket to victory over the Rochester Americans in the divisional finals.

Entering the offseason as a restricted free agent, Primeau was extended a qualifying offer by the Canadiens on June 30, 2025. That same day, he was traded to the Carolina Hurricanes in exchange for a 7th-round pick in the 2026 NHL entry draft. On July 1, Primeau agreed to a one-year, $775,000 contract with the Hurricanes for the 2025–26 season. However, before playing a game for Carolina, Primeau was claimed off waivers by the Toronto Maple Leafs on October 6 after goaltender Joseph Woll stepped away from the team for a personal matter. After appearing in three contests for the Leafs, recording two wins over that span, he was subsequently placed on waivers by Toronto on November 7 for the purpose of being sent to the AHL before being claimed by Carolina the next day. Due to underlying provisions in the NHL Collective Bargaining Agreement, the Hurricanes were permitted to send Primeau directly to their AHL affiliate Chicago Wolves without the need to clear waivers again.

== International play ==
Medal record

Representing United States

Men's ice hockey

World Junior Championships
Silver medal – second place	2019 Canada	

World U18 Championships
Gold medal – first place	2017 Slovakia	

World Junior A Challenge
Gold medal – first place	2016 Canada	

Ivan Hlinka Memorial Cup
Silver medal – second place	2016 Slovakia/Czech Republic	

Internationally, Primeau first represented Team USA at the 2015 Five Nations Cup held in Switzerland, splitting time in the decisive championship win over Germany.

At the 2016 Ivan Hlinka Memorial Cup, Primeau posted a 2.94 GAA and .854 save percentage in a silver medal effort. He then participated in the annual World Junior A Challenge where he went 3-1 en route to a gold medal victory, and was subsequently named to the tournament's All-Star Team.

The following year, Primeau was named to the United States national under-18 team for the World U18 Championships, winning a gold medal for his country despite not seeing any tournament play.

As part of the United States national junior team at the 2019 World Junior Ice Hockey Championships, Primeau made five tournament starts towards a silver medal podium finish. He likewise was named to the United States men's national team for that year's IIHF World Championship, but ultimately did not appear in any games throughout.

== Personal life ==
He is the son of former NHL centreman Keith Primeau, and was born in Farmington Hills, Michigan prior to the family moving to Voorhees, New Jersey when Cayden was five months old following his father's trade to the Philadelphia Flyers in January 2000.

Both his brothers, Chayse and Corey, played collegiately for the Omaha Mavericks and Neumann Knights respectively while his sister, Kylie, played lacrosse at Villanova University.

Primeau is an alumnus of Bishop Eustace Preparatory School.

== Career statistics ==
=== Regular season and playoffs ===
			Regular season									Playoffs
Season	Team	League	GP	W	L	OT	MIN	GA	SO	GAA	SV%	GP	W	L	MIN	GA	SO	GAA	SV%
2015–16	Philadelphia Revolution	EHL	29	16	5	0	1,224	38	0	1.86	.951	4	—	—	—	—	—	3.62	.910
2016–17	Lincoln Stars	USHL	30	14	11	1	1,616	85	1	3.16	.895	—	—	—	—	—	—	—	—
2017–18	Northeastern University	HE	34	19	8	5	2,005	64	4	1.92	.931	—	—	—	—	—	—	—	—
2018–19	Northeastern University	HE	36	25	10	1	2,129	74	4	2.09	.933	—	—	—	—	—	—	—	—
2019–20	Laval Rocket	AHL	33	17	11	3	1,887	77	4	2.45	.908	—	—	—	—	—	—	—	—
2019–20	Montreal Canadiens	NHL	2	1	1	0	120	5	0	2.52	.931	—	—	—	—	—	—	—	—
2020–21	Laval Rocket	AHL	16	11	4	0	914	32	2	2.10	.909	—	—	—	—	—	—	—	—
2020–21	Montreal Canadiens	NHL	4	1	2	1	202	14	0	4.16	.849	—	—	—	—	—	—	—	—
2021–22	Laval Rocket	AHL	33	16	12	3	1,915	94	2	2.94	.909	14	9	5	912	33	0	2.17	.936
2021–22	Montreal Canadiens	NHL	12	1	7	1	520	40	0	4.62	.868	—	—	—	—	—	—	—	—
2022–23	Laval Rocket	AHL	41	19	15	6	2,409	122	3	3.04	.909	2	0	2	119	5	0	2.52	.912
2022–23	Montreal Canadiens	NHL	3	0	2	0	139	8	0	3.46	.852	—	—	—	—	—	—	—	—
2023–24	Montreal Canadiens	NHL	23	8	9	4	1325	66	2	2.99	.910	—	—	—	—	—	—	—	—
2024–25	Montreal Canadiens	NHL	11	2	3	1	250	41	0	4.70	.836	—	—	—	—	—	—	—	—
2024–25	Laval Rocket	AHL	26	21	2	2	1528	50	2	1.96	.927	8	3	4	386	21	1	3.27	.878
2025–26	Toronto Maple Leafs	NHL	3	2	1	0	181	13	0	4.30	.838	—	—	—	—	—	—	—	—
2025–26	Chicago Wolves	AHL	39	21	11	7	2367	95	4	2.41	.916	18	9	9	1102	50	0	2.72	.913
NHL totals			58	15	25	7	3,053	187	2	3.73	.882	—	—	—	—	—	—	—	—

=== International ===
Year	Team	Event	Result	GP	W	L	OT	MIN	GA	SO	GAA	SV%
2016	United States	IH18	2nd place, silver medalist(s)	4	3	1	0	244	12	0	2.94	.854
2016	United States	WJAC	1st place, gold medalist(s)	4	3	1	0	239	3	2	0.75	.966
2017	United States	U18	1st place, gold medalist(s)	—	—	—	—	—	—	—	—	—
2019	United States	WJC	2nd place, silver medalist(s)	5	4	1	0	299	8	0	1.61	.936
2019	United States	WC	7th	—	—	—	—	—	—	—	—	—
Junior totals				13	10	3	0	782	23	2	1.76	.923

== Awards and honors ==
Award	Year	Ref
EHL
Rookie of the Year	2016	
Goaltender of the Year	2016	
USHL
CCM/USA Hockey All-American Prospects Game	2016	
USHL/NHL Top Prospects Game	2017	
College
Hockey East All-Rookie Team	2018	
Hockey East Goaltending Champion	2018, 2019	
New England D1 All-Stars	2018	
New England Rookie of the Year (co-winner)	2018	
All-Hockey East First Team	2018, 2019	
AHCA East First Team All-American	2019	
Hockey East All-Tournament Team	2019	
Hockey East Three-Stars Award	2019	
Mike Richter Award	2019	
William Flynn Tournament Most Valuable Player	2019	
AHL
All-Rookie Team	2020	
All-Star Game	2021	
AHL Goaltender of the Month (January 2025)	2025	
Harry "Hap" Holmes Memorial Award	2025	

Awards and achievements
Preceded by Collin Delia	Hockey East Goaltending Champion; 2017–18, 2018–19	Succeeded by Jeremy Swayman
Preceded by Adam Gaudette	Hockey East Three-Stars Award; 2018–19	Succeeded by John Leonard
Preceded by Cale Morris	Mike Richter Award; 2018–19	Succeeded by Jeremy Swayman
Preceded by Jake Oettinger	William Flynn Tournament MVP; 2019	Succeeded by Bobby Trivigno
