= Scott King (ice hockey, born 1967) =

Canadian ice hockey player (born 1967)

- Born: June 25, 1967 (age 58) Thunder Bay, Ontario, Canada
- Height: 6 ft 1 in (185 cm)
- Weight: 170 lb (77 kg; 12 st 2 lb)
- Position: Goaltender
- Caught: Right
- Played for: Detroit Red Wings
- NHL draft: 109th overall, 1986; Detroit Red Wings
- Playing career: 1990–1993

Scott Glenndale Martin King (born June 25, 1967) is a Canadian former professional ice hockey goaltender. He played in two National Hockey League games for the Detroit Red Wings during the 1990–91 and 1991–92 seasons. The rest of his career, which lasted from 1990 to 1993, was spent in the minor leagues. He was drafted 10th (190th overall) in the 1986 NHL entry draft.

== Early life ==
King was born in Thunder Bay, Ontario. He headed west from his hometown to join the Richmond Sockeyes of the British Columbia Junior Hockey League during his teenage years.

== Career ==
=== Minor league hockey ===
A fast reflex goalie with a right-handed catch, King quickly earned the starting job for the Sockeyes and played 40 games that year, winning 23 and with a 5.05 goals against average (GAA). During the 1985–86 season, King played for the Vernon Lakers and posting an even better 17–9–0 record in 29 games with a 4.64 GAA. The Detroit Red Wings decided to draft King 190th overall in the 1986 NHL Entry Draft.

King attended University of Maine after beginning the 1986–87 season with the Abbotsford Falcons. He had four successful years with the Maine Black Bears men's ice hockey team, being named to all-star teams, his last three years there and winning the Hockey East championship game in 1989 against the Boston College Eagles.

=== NHL ===
For the 1990–91 season, King had graduated from the University Maine and joined the Detroit Red Wings organization. He started play for the Hampton Roads Admirals of the East Coast Hockey League playing 15 games. His 8–4–1 record allowed him to be quickly called up to the Adirondack Red Wings of the American Hockey League. In 24 games King posted an 8–10–2 record, but showed promise and poise in the crease. When injury struck Red Wings goalie Tim Cheveldae, a slew of promising minors were called up to try and fill the void for the big club. King was called up on January 28, 1991 to back up goaltender Glen Hanlon in a game against the New Jersey Devils. New Jersey scored four goals against Hanlon in the first 15 minutes and he was pulled, putting King into his first NHL game. King gave up two goals on 11 shots but ended up with no record as the Wings lost 2–6. King finished out the year with Adirondack.

During the 1991–92 season, King moved between Adirondack, the ECHL affiliate Toledo Storm, and the main club. King again was put into an NHL game on November 30, 1991, as he played the last 16 minutes of a game, replacing Cheveldae in a 3–7 loss against the St. Louis Blues. King played 33 games in Adirondack, finishing with a 14–14–3 record and a 3.53 GAA. Young goalie Chris Osgood was picked up by Detroit for the 1992–93 season and was instantly given the start in most of the games. King was relegated to Toledo where he had a productive year. Having a solid goalie veteran on the team, Toledo excelled and King finished with 26–11–7 record and a playoff berth. King ended the playoffs with a 10–3 record and a Riley Cup victory in six games over the Wheeling Thunderbirds.

== Career statistics ==
=== Regular season and playoffs ===
			Regular season									Playoffs
Season	Team	League	GP	W	L	T	MIN	GA	SO	GAA	SV%	GP	W	L	MIN	GA	SO	GAA	SV%
1984–85	Richmond Sockeyes	BCJHL	40	23	9	0	2067	174	0	5.05	—	—	—	—	—	—	—	—	—
1985–86	Vernon Lakers	BCJHL	29	17	9	0	1718	133	0	4.64	—	—	—	—	—	—	—	—	—
1986–87	Abbotsford Falcons	BCJHL	11	—	—	—	582	52	0	5.43	—	—	—	—	—	—	—	—	—
1986–87	University of Maine	HE	21	11	6	1	1111	58	0	3.13	.894	2	1	1	115	7	0	3.65	—
1987–88	University of Maine	HE	33	25	5	1	1762	91	0	3.10	.896	6	4	2	340	20	0	3.53	—
1988–89	University of Maine	HE	27	13	8	0	1394	83	0	3.57	.877	3	1	2	189	17	0	5.40	—
1989–90	University of Maine	HE	29	17	7	2	1526	67	1	2.63	.900	4	2	2	240	9	1	2.25	—
1990–91	Detroit Red Wings	NHL	1	0	0	0	45	2	0	2.67	.818	—	—	—	—	—	—	—	—
1990–91	Adirondack Red Wings	AHL	24	8	10	2	1287	91	0	4.24	.861	1	0	0	32	4	0	7.50	—
1990–91	Hampton Roads Admirals	ECHL	15	8	4	1	819	57	0	4.17	.880	—	—	—	—	—	—	—	—
1991–92	Adirondack Red Wings	AHL	33	14	14	3	1904	112	0	3.53	.879	—	—	—	—	—	—	—	—
1991–92	Detroit Red Wings	NHL	1	0	0	0	16	1	0	3.75	.800	—	—	—	—	—	—	—	—
1991–92	Toledo Storm	ECHL	7	4	2	1	424	25	0	3.54	.897	—	—	—	—	—	—	—	—
1992–93	Adirondack Red Wings	AHL	1	1	0	0	60	1	0	1.00	.974	—	—	—	—	—	—	—	—
1992–93	Toledo Storm	ECHL	45	26	11	7	2602	153	2	3.53	.889	14	10	3	823	52	0	3.79	—
NHL totals			2	0	0	0	61	3	0	2.95	.813	—	—	—	—	—	—	—	—

== Awards and honors ==
Award	Year
All-Hockey East First Team	1987–88
All-Hockey East Second Team	1988–89
All-Hockey East First Team	1989–90

- Named to BCJHL Coastal Division First All-Star Team: 1985
- Named to ECHL Second All-Star Team: 1993
- Riley Cup Champion: (Toledo Storm – 1993)

Awards and achievements
Preceded by Scott Gordon; Incumbent; David Littman	Hockey East Goaltending Champion; 1986–87; 1987–88; 1989–90	Succeeded by Incumbent; David Littman; Scott LaGrand
