= Jeremy Swayman =

American ice hockey player (born 1998)

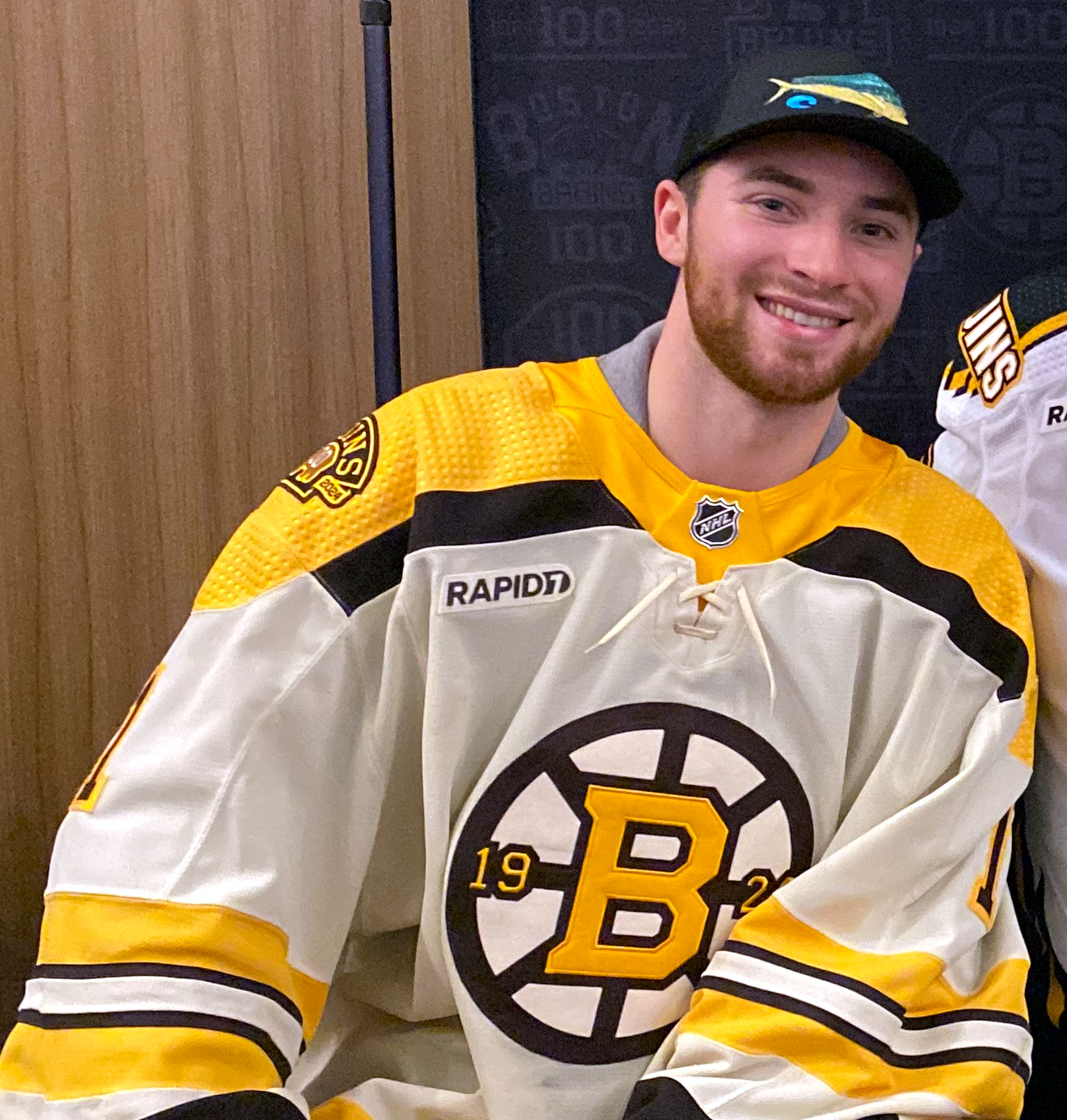
- Swayman with the Boston Bruins in 2023
- Born: November 24, 1998 (age 27) Anchorage, Alaska, U.S.
- Height: 6 ft 2 in (188 cm)
- Weight: 197 lb (89 kg; 14 st 1 lb)
- Position: Goaltender
- Catches: Left
- NHL team: Boston Bruins
- National team: United States
- NHL draft: 111th overall, 2017; Boston Bruins
- Playing career: 2021–present

Jeremy Rion Swayman (born November 24, 1998), nicknamed "Sway" or "Bulldog", is an American professional ice hockey player who is a goaltender for the Boston Bruins of the National Hockey League (NHL). The Bruins selected him in the fourth round, 111th overall, of the 2017 NHL entry draft.

Born and raised in Anchorage, Alaska, Swayman began attending Alaska Anchorage Seawolves men's ice hockey games as an infant with his father, and he took up goaltending at the age of five. After being cut from his local Kenai River Brown Bears, Swayman played one season of junior ice hockey with the Pikes Peak Miners. After that, he joined the United States Hockey League to play one season with the Sioux Falls Stampede. Before being drafted by the Bruins, Swayman played college ice hockey for three seasons with the Maine Black Bears. Swayman had a .939 save percentage and 2.07 goals against average during the 2019–20 season, and he was awarded both the Hockey East Player of the Year award and the Mike Richter Award for the top collegiate goaltender.

Swayman left Maine after three years to join the Bruins. Due to the impacts of the COVID-19 pandemic, his professional hockey career did not begin until the 2020–21 season. Swayman spent the first part of the season with the Providence Bruins of the AHL but was promoted to the NHL in April after Boston's primary goaltenders were sidelined by injury and illness. His performance in the remainder of the season led Bruce Cassidy to name Swayman Tuukka Rask's backup goaltender in the 2021 Stanley Cup playoffs, but he appeared in only one postseason game. After Rask and former backup goalie Jaroslav Halák left the Bruins in 2021 and 2022 respectively, Swayman formed a goaltending platoon with veteran Linus Ullmark, with whom he won the William M. Jennings Trophy for allowing the fewest goals in the 2022–23 season.

== Early life ==
Swayman was born on November 24, 1998, in Anchorage, Alaska, to Anne Boesenberg and Ken Swayman. Swayman is Jewish and had a bar mitzvah. He began watching college ice hockey games as an infant when his father would take him to watch the Alaska Anchorage Seawolves. Swayman first played as a goaltender when he was five years old, and he quickly became attached to the position. He played youth ice hockey around Anchorage and spent two years with the team at South Anchorage High School before starting his junior ice hockey career. He had expected to stay in Alaska and play for the Kenai River Brown Bears of the North American Hockey League, but he was cut from the team in favor of two older goaltenders. Instead, through the help of several family friends, Swayman joined the Pikes Peak Miners of the Rocky Mountain Junior Hockey League. In 18 games for the Miners, Swayman had a .940 save percentage (SV%) and a 1.79 goals against average (GAA).

After one season with the Miners, Swayman was selected by the Sioux Falls Stampede of the United States Hockey League in the 12th round of the 2016 USHL Phase II Draft. Sioux Falls coach Scott Owens had first taken notice of Swayman during his season in Pikes Peak, and he remained impressed by the goaltender during training camp. After leading all USHL goaltenders in preseason save percentage, Swayman stopped 48 shots on goal in his Stampede debut, a 3–2 shootout win over the Tri-City Storm. In 32 games with Sioux Falls, Swayman posted a 7–18–3 record, .914 SV%, and 2.90 GAA, and the NHL Central Scouting Bureau named him the No. 12 prospect among all North American goaltenders. At the end of the USHL season, the Boston Bruins of the National Hockey League (NHL) selected Swayman in the fourth round, 111th overall, of the 2017 NHL entry draft.

== Playing career ==
=== Collegiate ===
At the time the Bruins drafted him, Swayman had already committed to playing college ice hockey for the University of Maine, beginning in the 2017–18 season. Swayman made his collegiate hockey debut on October 7, 2017, making 26 saves but taking the loss in Maine's 5–1 defeat against UConn. After making 40 saves to give the Black Bears a 5–2 win over Boston University on November 17, the Hockey East conference named Swayman their Rookie of the Week. He received the award again on January 8 after posting his first career shutout, stopping all 31 shots he faced in a 3–0 win over Boston University. He was named the Hockey East Rookie of the Month for the month of January after going 4–2–2 with a conference rookie-leading .928 SV% and 2.34 GAA in eight games. Swayman finished his freshman season with a .920 save percentage (SV%) and 2.74 goals against average (GAA), while his 15–13–3 record was the best of any Maine rookie goaltender since Ben Bishop. He was named to the Hockey East All-Rookie Team and was an All-Star Honorable Mention.

Swayman's first Hockey East honor of the 2018–19 season came on November 19, when he was named the Defensive Player of the Week after making 79 saves in a two-game series against Boston University. He won the award again on December 3 after stopping 74 shots in a two-game series against Vermont. On January 26, Swayman made a career-high 53 saves in Maine's 4–3 upset win over UMass. After going 5–2–1 with a .918 SV% and 2.86 GAA in the month of February, with 30 or more saves in six of his outings, Swayman was named the Hockey East Goaltender of the Month. Swayman finished his sophomore season with a .919 SV%, a 2.77 GAA, and a 14–17–4 record in 35 games, and he was named to the All-Hockey East Third Team.

After a difficult start to the 2019–20 season, in which Swayman made 52 saves but Maine lost 7–0 to Providence, Swayman posted a .962 SV% and 1.22 GAA in the next six games. He was named the Hockey East Goaltender of the Month for February 2020 after going 4–2–1 with 210 saves for the month, including two shutouts. Swayman finished the season with an 18–11–5 record, .939 SV%, 2.07 GAA, and led all NCAA Division I goaltenders with 1,099 saves for the year. He earned a number of accolades at the end of the season, beginning with the Walter Brown Award, given to the top American-born college hockey player in New England. Hockey East named him a First-Team All-Star, the Goaltending Champion, and the Player of the Year. He was also an All-USCHO Second Team honoree, the first Maine goaltender to receive CCM/AHCA All-American East first-team honors since Spencer Abbott in 2012, and the New England Hockey Writers Association named him their Leonard Fowle New England MVP. He was the runner-up for the Hobey Baker Award, given to the top men's college ice hockey player in the United States, an honor which went that year to Scott Perunovich of the Minnesota Duluth Bulldogs. Swayman closed out the 2020 awards season with the Mike Richter Award, given to the top NCAA Division I men's ice hockey goaltender of the year.

At the conclusion of the 2019–20 season, Swayman announced that he would be leaving Maine to begin his professional hockey career with the Bruins. He finished his college career as Maine's all-time leader with 3,130 saves and 5,906:45 minutes played, while his 2.51 GAA was fifth in franchise history and his .927 SV% was behind only Jimmy Howard.

=== Professional ===
==== 2020–21 ====
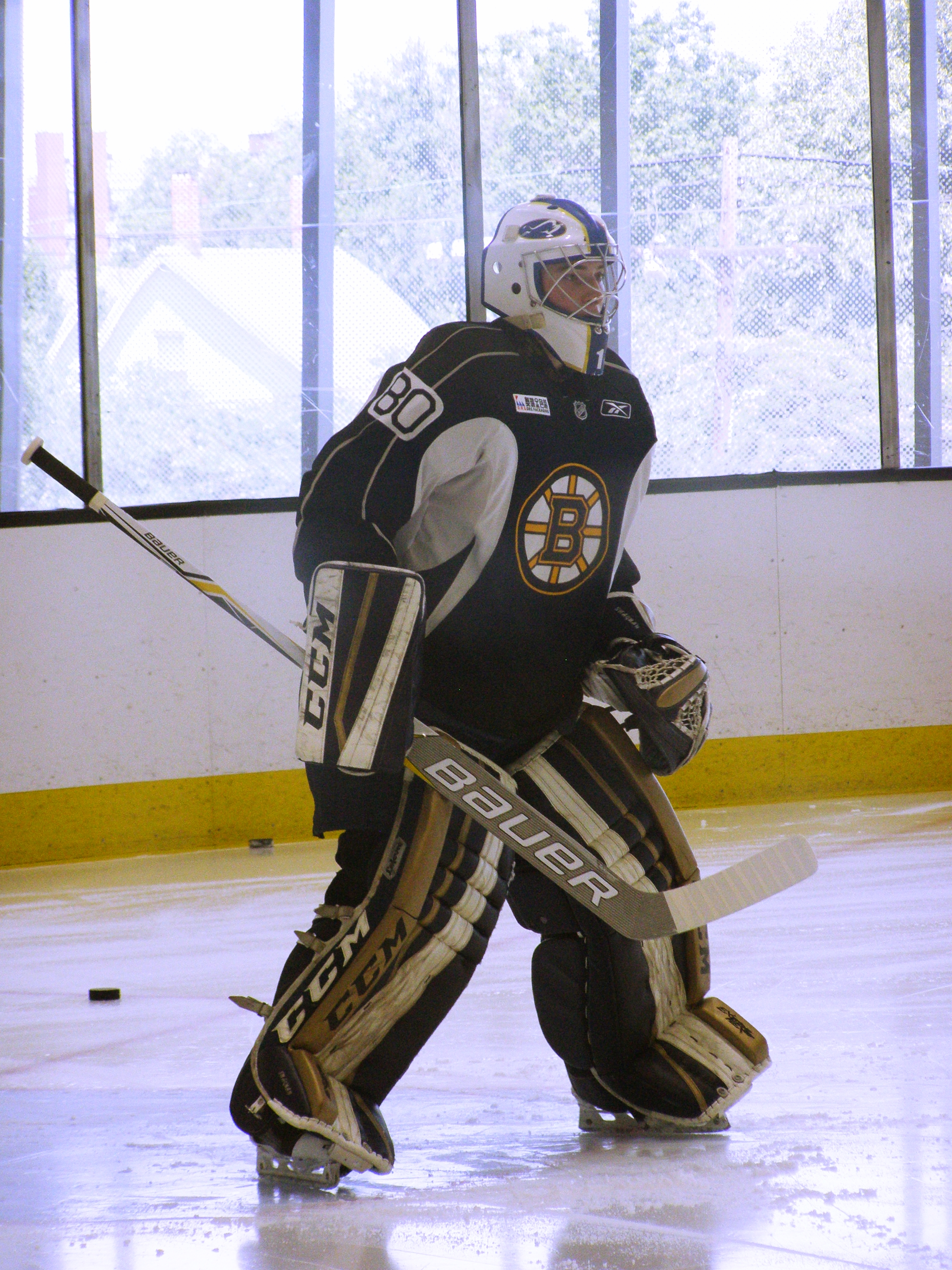
Swayman at training camp with the Bruins in 2017

Swayman officially signed a three-year, entry-level contract with the Bruins on March 18, 2020. At the time, ice hockey at the NCAA, NHL, and American Hockey League (AHL) levels had all been suspended due to the COVID-19 pandemic. As a result, Swayman's professional career began in the 2020–21 season, when he was assigned to the Providence Bruins, Boston's AHL affiliate. He won his first seven games of the season, posting a 1.57 GAA and .942 SV% in those games. In nine games for Providence, Swayman went 8–1–0 with a .933 SV% and 1.89 GAA, and he was named to the AHL Atlantic Division All-Star Team at the end of the season.

With Tuukka Rask sidelined by an upper-body injury and Jaroslav Halák testing positive for COVID-19, Swayman was promoted to make his NHL debut on April 6, 2021. He made 40 saves as the Bruins won 4–2 against the Philadelphia Flyers. His first NHL shutout came on April 16, when he stopped all 25 shots he faced in the Bruins' 3–0 win over the New York Islanders. Swayman played in 10 games for the last six weeks of the Bruins' regular season, during which he went 7–3–0 with a .945 SV% and a 1.50 GAA. His regular-season performance prompted coach Bruce Cassidy to select Swayman over Halák as Rask's backup goaltender in the 2021 Stanley Cup playoffs. He made his postseason debut in Game 5 of the Bruins' second-round playoff series against the Islanders, relieving Rask for the third period. Swayman faced three shots, stopping two and allowing a Brock Nelson goal in a game that the Bruins lost 5–4. Cassidy opted not to play Swayman in Game 6, and the Bruins were eliminated from the playoffs with their 6–2 loss to the Islanders.

==== 2021–22 ====
While Halák left the Bruins to join the Vancouver Canucks during the 2021 offseason, Rask underwent surgery to repair a torn hip labrum and was expected to miss the first half of the 2021–22 season. Without their two veteran goaltenders, the Bruins turned to Swayman and newcomer Linus Ullmark. Through his first eight games of the season, Swayman was 5–3–0 with a .908 SV% and a 2.39 GAA, his numbers partially deflated by allowing five goals against the Flyers on October 20. Rask returned to the Bruins on January 11, and Swayman, who was 8–6–2 with a .918 SV% and 2.26 GAA, was sent down to Providence to make room for the other goaltender. Rask soon suffered a setback in his recovery, and Swayman was promoted back to Boston at the end of January, a promotion that became permanent when Rask announced his retirement in February. After going 5–1–1 with a .960 SV%, a 1.13 GAA, and two shutouts in seven starts that month, Swayman was named the NHL Rookie of the Month for February 2022. Swayman finished the regular season with a 23–14–3 record in 40 games and led all rookie NHL goaltenders with a 2.37 GAA, .913 SV%, and three shutouts. The New England Sports Network and the Bruins awarded Swayman the 2022 Seventh Player Award, given annually to the player who "performs above and beyond expectations". The Bruins faced the Carolina Hurricanes in the first round of the 2022 Stanley Cup playoffs, with Swayman making his first postseason start in Game 3. He made 25 saves on 27 shots as Boston took the 4–2 victory. Swayman finished the seven-game series with a 2.63 GAA and .911 SV% in five appearances, but the Hurricanes eliminated the Bruins 3–2 in the winner-take-all match. Swayman finished in fifth place for the 2022 Calder Memorial Trophy and was also named to the NHL All-Rookie Team as goaltender.

==== 2022–23 ====
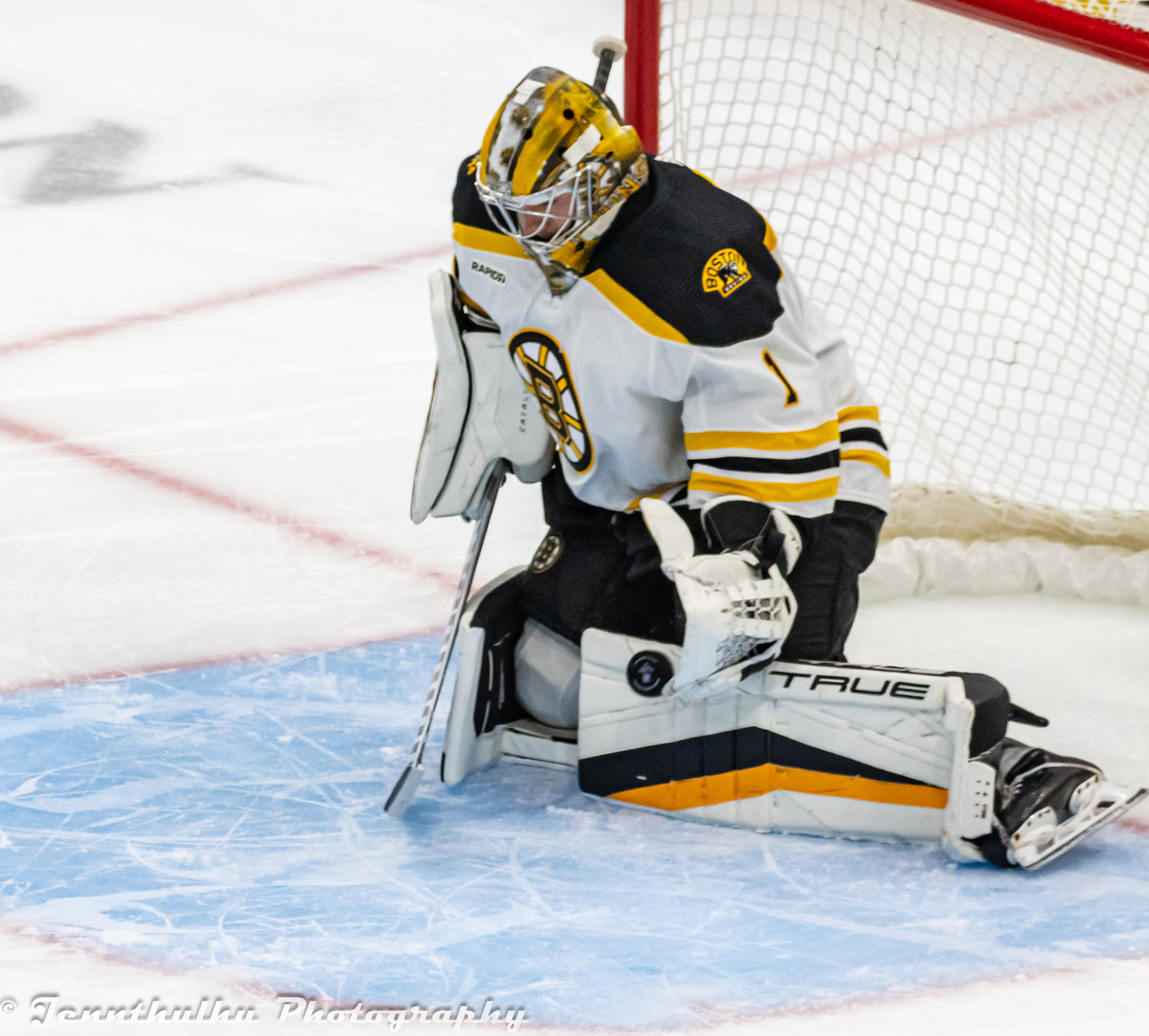
Swayman with the Bruins during a game against the Seattle Kraken in February 2023

The 2022–23 season was a historic one for the Bruins, and for Swayman, who formed the best goaltending tandem in the league with Ullmark. Swayman and Ullmark's post-victory "goalie hug" became a widely-covered team ritual. The Bruins finished the regular season with new records in both wins (65) and points (135), winning the Presidents' Trophy. Ullmark and Swayman together received the William M. Jennings Trophy as the goaltending tandem to allow the fewest goals. Their 177 goals-against across 82 games was 36 fewer than the second-place Hurricanes. The Bruins entered the 2023 Stanley Cup playoffs as the favorites for the championship. However, they were ousted in the first round by the Florida Panthers, squandering a 3–1 series lead in the process. The series was dubbed "one of the worst choke jobs in Boston sports history." Much recrimination ensued about coach Jim Montgomery's roster decisions, in particular the choice to depart from the team's regular season goalie rotation in favor of playing Ullmark exclusively, despite him dealing with an injury. Swayman ultimately was given the start in Game 7, but the Bruins were defeated 4–3 in overtime.

==== 2023–24 ====
On August 1, 2023, the Bruins and Swayman agreed to a one-year, $3.475 million contract in arbitration. After the hearing, Swayman expressed his discontent with the process, saying it was something he "never wants to do again", but he maintained that he had no feelings of ill-will towards the Bruins organization.

With Ullmark coming off a Vezina Trophy–winning season, Swayman entered the 2023–24 season as Boston's "1B" goaltender. In the first month of the season, Swayman posted a 6–0–0 record with a .952 SV%. Swayman's first regulation loss came on November 23, at which point he had gone 7–0–2, with a 2.09 GAA and a .933 SV%. Swayman continued his impressive play, and on January 13, 2024, he was named to his first career All-Star Game. At the All-Star Game, Swayman was picked by Team MacKinnon. He played 10 minutes in a 4–3 shootout loss to Team McDavid in the semi-final. With the performance, Swayman became the second Alaskan-born player to play in the All-Star Game, after Scott Gomez.

After the All-Star Game, Swayman and the Bruins fell into a short slump, as the team only won three of their next eleven games, and Swayman went 2–5 during the stretch. With the help of Swayman, the Bruins finished second in the Atlantic Division, setting up a first-round match with the Toronto Maple Leafs in the 2024 Stanley Cup playoffs. Swayman finished the regular season with a 25–10–8 record, a 2.53 GAA, and a .916 SV%. For the first time in his career, Swayman played in Game 1 of the playoffs, which the Bruins won 5–1, with Swayman making 35 saves on 36 shots. Attempting to learn from the previous year's collapse, the Bruins decided to start Ullmark the following game, where they lost 3–2 in overtime. After Game 2, Swayman started the rest of the series, which he dominated. Although the series went seven games, much of it was to blame on the lack of Boston offense, and Swayman was credited for bailing out his teammates. Swayman posted an outstanding .950 SV% and a 1.49 GAA in the series, including stopping 30 shots in a 2–1 overtime win in the decisive Game 7.

Swayman's play in the first round led Bruins head coach Jim Montgomery to start Swayman entering a second round rematch against the Florida Panthers. After a decisive 5–1 victory in Game 1, Swayman was pulled after letting up four goals in Game 2's 6–1 loss. In Game 4, Panthers player Sam Bennett scored a goal on Swayman, with several observers calling for goalie interference against the Panthers. Swayman made 28 stops in a 2–1 victory in Game 5, with the Bruins losing to the eventual Stanley Cup-champion Panthers in six games.

==== 2024–25 ====
Swayman entered the offseason as a restricted free agent, and was due for a major pay raise due to his outstanding season. However, the contract negotiations did not go smoothly. Negotiations went well into the summer, over what many saw a disagreement over the money. Tensions between the camps seemed to reach an all-time high when on September 1, 2024, with training camp started and still no contract, Bruins president Cam Neely said in a press conference that he could think of "64 million reasons for [Swayman] to be playing now", seemingly an indication that the Bruins had offered a $64 million dollar contract to Swayman. This was disputed by Swayman's agent, Lewis Gross, who claimed that the number was never discussed, and that he and Swayman were "disappointed" by the comments, and that he and Swayman would "take a few days to discuss where we go from here." The Bruins would continue through the preseason without Swayman on the roster. On October 6, two days before the Bruins season opener against the Florida Panthers, he signed an 8 year, $66 million dollar contract.

Entering the season, for the first time in his career, Swayman was seen as the clear starting goaltender for the Bruins, as for most of his career, he platooned with Linus Ullmark. However, due to the late signing of his contract, Swayman did not start their opening game of the 2024–25 season for the Bruins, as he had missed training camp as a result of this. He made his season debut in the second game of the season, a 6–4 win against the Montreal Canadiens. However, Swayman struggled to begin the season, and many saw this as a result of him missing training camp, as well as him taking on a larger role as the true starting goaltender. These struggles eventually led him to be called out by then-head coach Jim Montgomery, and even became the subject of multiple rumors surrounding his standing in the Bruins locker room, which claimed his contract holdout had rubbed teammates the wrong way.

In December 2024, things seemed to be turning around for Swayman and the Bruins, as Swayman won seven of his nine starts. However, soon after, things got rough for Swayman and the Bruins again, and by mid-March, it seemed like the season was lost. On March 23, 2025, Swayman gained attention when he challenged Los Angeles Kings netminder Darcy Kuemper to a fight at center ice during a game. Kuemper seemed to accept the invitation, and gloves were dropped. However, the referees stepped between the two before they could exchange punches, disappointing many fans. It would've been the first goalie fight since 2020. However, controversy still lingered after postgame comments by Bruins defenseman Nikita Zadorov seemingly seemed to take a shot at Swayman's decision to try and drop the gloves. The comments once again fueled rumors that Swayman had issues in the Bruins locker room. However, Zadarov cleared the air, claiming he was frustrated after a 7–2 loss and didn't mean anything as an insult toward Swayman.

Swayman and the Bruins continued to struggle throughout the end of the season, and eventually, they were eliminated from postseason contention, marking the first time in Swayman's career he had missed the playoffs. Swayman would start a career-high 58 games during the season, compiling a 22–29–7 record, and recording a career-worst 3.29 GAA and .892 SV%.

==== 2025–26 season ====
During the 2026 NHL Stadium Series game against the Tampa Bay Lightning on February 1, 2026, Swayman took exception to Brandon Hagel digging into his body after Swayman made a save and checked Hagel to the ice. Lightning's goaltender Andrei Vasilevskiy skated to the Bruins' end of the ice, and the two fought. It was the second goaltender fight of the season, after Alex Nedeljkovic fought Sergei Bobrovsky less than two weeks earlier.

In late April, Swayman was announced as one of the finalists for the Vezina Trophy alongside Andrei Vasilevskiy and Illya Sorokin. During the 2025–26 season, Swayman has a .908 save percentage in 54 games, and allowed two or fewer goals in 31 games leading the team to the playoffs. During game 4 of the first round of playoffs against the Buffalo Sabres, Swayman was pulled from the game following the sixth Buffalo goal, leading to him chastised his team on the bench before heading to the locker room. Coach Marco Sturm expressed his support of Swayman's actions and comments, following the 6–1 loss.

== International play ==
Medal record

Men's ice hockey

Representing the United States

Olympic Games
Gold medal – first place	2026 Milano Cortina	

World Championships
Gold medal – first place	2025 Sweden/Denmark	

4 Nations Face-Off
Runner-up	2025 Canada/United States	

World Junior Championships
Bronze medal – third place	2018 United States	

Swayman made his international ice hockey debut when he was selected to represent the United States junior team at the 2018 World Junior Ice Hockey Championships in Buffalo, New York. As the third goaltender behind Jake Oettinger and Joseph Woll, Swayman received limited playing time in the tournament outside of an exhibition game against Sweden and the bronze-medal match against the Czech Republic. Swayman played in the final 3 minutes and 19 seconds of the third-place game, allowing no goals as Team USA defeated the Czech Republic 9–3 to take the bronze medal.

Following an injury to Alex Nedeljkovic of the Detroit Red Wings, Swayman joined the United States national team for the 2022 IIHF World Championship in Finland. He recorded a shutout in his first World Championship appearance, stopping all 17 shots he faced in a 3–0 win over Great Britain. The United States team finished in fourth place, losing the bronze-medal match 8–4 to Czechia. Swayman allowed seven goals in the game but finished the tournament with a .909 SV%, 2.23 GAA, and two shutouts.

With the Bruins missing the playoffs, Swayman was once again named to the U.S. national team for the 2025 IIHF World Championship, his second appearance with the team. Swayman earned the starting nod for the team in the playoff round, where he would help the U.S. earn its first trip to the gold medal match since 1933. In the gold medal game, Swayman would post a shutout in a 1–0 overtime win over Switzerland to give the U.S. its first gold medal since 1980. Overall in the tournament, Swayman went undefeated at 7-0, with 1.69 GAA and .921 SV%.

== Personal life ==
During the 2021–22 NHL season, Swayman and fellow Bruins goaltender Linus Ullmark went viral for the hugs they gave each other after games. The ritual began after the Bruins won their home opener, after which Swayman said, "I don't think it's leaving, it was perfect".

Swayman and his long-time girlfriend Alessandra Iacaboni became engaged in late 2025 and welcomed their son Briggs in June 2026.

Amid online backlash faced by the men's Olympic hockey team regarding the inclusion of FBI director Kash Patel during their gold medal celebrations and members of the team laughing at President Trump's comments of being impeached if he did not invite the women's team to the White House, the team was invited to meet with the president and attend the State of the Union. Swayman was among the majority who visited with the president and attended the State of the Union, calling both "an incredible honor". Swayman later told reporters that the USA men's team should have reacted differently to the comments made and that there is shared respect and excitement between the two teams.

== Career statistics ==
=== Regular season and playoffs ===
			Regular season									Playoffs
Season	Team	League	GP	W	L	T/OT	MIN	GA	SO	GAA	SV%	GP	W	L	MIN	GA	SO	GAA	SV%
2016–17	Sioux Falls Stampede	USHL	32	7	18	3	1,883	91	0	2.90	.914	—	—	—	—	—	—	—	—
2017–18	University of Maine	HE	31	15	12	3	1,812	82	1	2.72	.921	—	—	—	—	—	—	—	—
2018–19	University of Maine	HE	35	14	17	4	2,035	94	0	2.77	.919	—	—	—	—	—	—	—	—
2019–20	University of Maine	HE	34	18	11	5	2,060	71	3	2.07	.939	—	—	—	—	—	—	—	—
2020–21	Providence Bruins	AHL	9	8	1	0	540	17	1	1.89	.933	—	—	—	—	—	—	—	—
2020–21	Boston Bruins	NHL	10	7	3	0	601	15	2	1.50	.945	1	0	1	19	1	0	3.23	.667
2021–22	Boston Bruins	NHL	41	23	14	3	2,390	96	3	2.41	.914	5	3	2	296	13	0	2.63	.911
2021–22	Providence Bruins	AHL	5	3	2	0	303	11	0	2.18	.911	—	—	—	—	—	—	—	—
2022–23	Boston Bruins	NHL	37	24	6	4	2,013	76	4	2.27	.920	2	0	1	72	4	0	3.34	.875
2023–24	Boston Bruins	NHL	44	25	10	8	2,566	108	3	2.53	.916	12	6	6	698	25	0	2.15	.933
2024–25	Boston Bruins	NHL	58	22	29	7	3,391	176	4	3.11	.892	—	—	—	—	—	—	—	—
2025–26	Boston Bruins	NHL	55	31	18	4	3,235	146	2	2.71	.908	6	2	4	351	17	0	2.91	.906
NHL totals			245	132	80	26	14,197	617	18	2.61	.910	26	11	14	1,434	60	0	2.51	.918

=== International ===
Year	Team	Event	Result	GP	W	L	T	MIN	GA	SO	GAA	SV%
2018	United States	WJC	3rd place, bronze medalist(s)	1	0	0	0	3	0	0	0.00	1.000
2022	United States	WC	4th	7	4	3	0	376	14	2	2.23	.910
2025	United States	4NF	2nd	—	—	—	—	—	—	—	—	—
2025	United States	WC	1st place, gold medalist(s)	7	7	0	0	426	12	2	1.69	.921
2026	United States	OG	1st place, gold medalist(s)	1	1	0	0	60	3	0	3.00	.857
Junior totals				1	0	0	0	3	0	0	0.00	1.000
Senior totals				15	12	3	0	862	29	3	2.02	.911

== Awards and honors ==
Award	Year	Ref
College
Hockey East All-Rookie Team	2018	
Hockey East All-Star Honorable Mention	2018	
Hockey East Third All-Star Team	2019	
Hockey East First All-Star Team	2020	
Hockey East Goaltending Champion	2020	
Hockey East Player of the Year	2020	
All-USCHO Second Team	2020	
AHCA East First-Team All-American	2020	
Leonard Fowle New England MVP	2020	
Mike Richter Award	2020	
Hobey Baker Award Finalist	2020	
Walter Brown Award	2020	
AHL
AHL Atlantic Division All-Star Team	2021	
NHL
NHL Rookie of the Month (February)	2022	
NHL All-Rookie Team	2022	
William M. Jennings Trophy	2023	
NHL All-Star Game	2024	
International
IIHF World Championship Top 3 Player on Team	2022	
Boston Bruins
Seventh Player Award	2022	
Elizabeth C. Dufresne Trophy	2026	
Bruins Three Stars Awards	2026	

Awards and achievements
Preceded by Cayden Primeau	Mike Richter Award; 2019–20	Succeeded by Jack LaFontaine
Preceded by Cale Makar	Hockey East Player of the Year; 2019–20	Succeeded by Spencer Knight
Preceded by Cayden Primeau	Hockey East Goaltending Champion; 2019–20	Succeeded by Spencer Knight
Preceded by Frederik Andersen; Antti Raanta	William M. Jennings Trophy; 2022–23; With: Linus Ullmark	Succeeded by Connor Hellebuyck
