= 2004 Hockey East men's ice hockey tournament =

2004 Hockey East Men's ice hockey tournament
- Dates: March 11–20, 2004
- Teams: 8
- Finals site: Fleet Center; Boston, Massachusetts
- Champions: Maine (5th title)
- Winning coach: Tim Whitehead (1st title)
- MVP: Jimmy Howard (Maine)
- Hockey East Men's Ice Hockey Tournaments

The 2004 Hockey East Men's Ice Hockey Tournament was the 20th tournament in the history of the conference. It was played between March 11 and March 20, 2004. Quarterfinal games were played at home team campus sites, while the final four games were played at the Fleet Center in Boston, Massachusetts, the home venue of the NHL's Boston Bruins. By winning the tournament Maine received the Hockey East's automatic bid to the 2004 NCAA Division I Men's Ice Hockey Tournament.

== Format ==
The tournament featured three rounds of play. The team that finishes ninth in the conference is not eligible for tournament play. In the first round, the first and eighth seeds, the second and seventh seeds, the third seed and sixth seeds, and the fourth seed and fifth seeds played a best-of-three with the winner advancing to the semifinals. In the semifinals, the highest and lowest seeds and second highest and second lowest seeds play a single-elimination game, with the winner advancing to the championship game. The tournament champion receives an automatic bid to the 2004 NCAA Division I Men's Ice Hockey Tournament.

== Conference standings ==
Note: GP = Games played; W = Wins; L = Losses; T = Ties; PTS = Points; GF = Goals For; GA = Goals Against

2003–04 Hockey East standings
	Conference							Overall					
	GP	W	L	T	PTS	GF	GA	GP	W	L	T	GF	GA
#3 Boston College†	24	17	4	3	37	88	45	42	29	9	4	143	81
#2 Maine*	24	17	5	2	36	77	42	44	33	8	3	141	69
Massachusetts	24	12	9	3	27	47	63	37	17	14	6	93	99
#11 New Hampshire	24	10	8	6	26	82	76	41	20	15	6	138	116
Providence	24	7	11	6	20	63	66	37	16	14	7	106	92
Massachusetts–Lowell	24	7	12	5	19	56	65	40	15	18	7	105	116
Merrimack	24	6	12	6	18	53	79	36	11	19	6	86	110
Boston University	24	6	13	5	17	57	71	38	12	17	9	103	108
Northeastern	24	5	13	6	16	56	72	34	11	16	7	92	103
Championship: Maine † indicates conference regular season champion * indicates conference tournament champion Final rankings: USA Today/American Hockey Magazine Poll Top 15 Poll

== Bracket ==
Quarterfinals; March 11–13
1	Boston College	2	4	2
8	Boston University	3	0	4
2	Maine	2	3	—
7	Merrimack	1	2	—
(Pairings are reseeded after the first round)
3	Massachusetts	6	3	–
6	Massachusetts-Lowell	3	1	–
4	New Hampshire	2	3	1
5	Providence	1	4*	0

Semifinals; March 19
2	Maine	1
8	Boston University	0
3	Massachusetts	5
4	New Hampshire	2

Championship; March 20
2	Maine	2***
3	Massachusetts	1

Note: * denotes overtime period(s)

=== Quarterfinals ===
==== (1) Boston College vs. (8) Boston University ====
March 11	Boston College	2 – 3	Boston University	Conte Forum	Recap
No Scoring		First period	08:57 - PP - Brian McConnell (Redlihs, Mullen); 11:11 - Brad Zancanaro (Radoslovich, Van der Gulik)
No scoring		Second period	16:17 - GW - Kenny Roche (Skladany, Laliberte)
(Hennes) Andrew Alberts - 05:40 (Collins) Ben Eaves - EA - 19:20		Third period	No scoring
( 7 saves / 10 shots ) Matti Kaltianen		Goalie stats	Sean Fields ( 28 saves / 30 shots )

March 12	Boston College	4 – 0	Boston University	Conte Forum	Recap
(Forrest, Voce) Ryan Shannon - GW PP - 10:09 (Gionta) Ryan Shannon - 16:51		First period	No scoring
No scoring		Second period	No scoring
(Murphy, Hennes) Ned Havern - 13:30 (Eaves) Tony Voce - EN SH - 17:46		Third period	No scoring
( 14 saves / 14 shots ) Matti Kaltianen		Goalie stats	Sean Fields ( 37 saves / 40 shots )

March 13	Boston College	2 – 3	Boston University	Conte Forum	Recap
No Scoring		First period	08:57 - PP - Brad Zancanaro (Miller, Whitney)
(Forrest) Tony Voce - 05:12		Second period	10:21 - Kenny Roche (Laliberte, Skladany); 11:46 - GW - Bryan Miller (Redlihs); 15:15 - Eric Thomassian
(Voce, Eaves) Ben Eaves - PP - 15:25		Third period	No scoring
( 17 saves / 21 shots ) Matti Kaltianen		Goalie stats	Sean Fields ( 35 saves / 37 shots )

Boston University won series 2–1

==== (2) Maine vs. (7) Merrimack ====
March 12	Maine	2 – 1	Merrimack	Alfond Arena	Recap
Colin Shields - SH - 07:29		First period	08:34 - PP - Tim Reidy (Johnson, Pomponio)
No scoring		Second period	No scoring
(Zabowicz, Mullin) Colin Shields - GW - 13:43		Third period	No scoring
( 14 saves / 15 shots ) Jimmy Howard		Goalie stats	Jim Healey ( 25 saves / 27 shots )

March 13	Maine	3 – 2	Merrimack	Alfond Arena	Recap
No Scoring		First period	17:05 - Brendon Clark(Sullivan, Caron)
(Jackson, Penner) Colin Shields - 13:39		Second period	17:05 - PP - Tony Johnson (Schmidt, Gough)
(Murphy) John Ronan - SH - 02:15 (Damon, Lundin) Todd Jackson - GW - 07:43		Third period	No scoring
( 9 saves / 11 shots ) Frank Doyle		Goalie stats	Jim Healey ( 33 saves / 36 shots )

Maine won series 2–0

==== (3) Massachusetts vs. (6) Massachusetts-Lowell ====
March 11	Massachusetts	6 – 3	Massachusetts-Lowell	William D. Mullins Memorial Center	Recap
(Demianiuk) Tim Vitek - 10:54 (Pöck, Demianiuk) Greg Mauldin - 16:37		First period	05:09 - Jason Tejchma (Martin)
(Pöck) Stephen Werner - 03:03 (Werner, Jarman) Mike Warner - GW - 05:48 (Jarman) Thomas Pöck - PP - 11:03		Second period	No scoring
(Pöck, Kuiper) Mike Warner - 13:11		Third period	11:30 - Ben Walter (Fletcher, O'Brien); 16:35 - Bobby Robins (Tejchma, Martin)
( 39 saves / 42 shots ) Tim Warner		Goalie stats	Chris Davidson ( 12 saves / 18 shots )

March 12	Massachusetts	3 – 1	Massachusetts-Lowell	William D. Mullins Memorial Center	Recap
(Solon, Aduba) Josh Hanson - 10:20		First period	10:52 - Matt Collar (Pandolfo, Kinley)
(Solon, Trovato) Dusty Demianiuk - GW - 12:12		Second period	No scoring
Greg Mauldin - 14:36		Third period	No scoring
( 22 saves / 23 shots ) Tim Warner		Goalie stats	John Yaros ( 21 saves / 24 shots )

Massachusetts won series 2–0

==== (4) New Hampshire vs. (5) Providence ====
March 11	New Hampshire	2 – 1	Providence	Whittemore Center	Recap
(Saviano, Mounsey) Sean Collins - 07:52		First period	No scoring
No scoring		Second period	16:31 - PP - Cody Loughlean (Wood, Pemberton)
(Saviano, Aikins) Sean Collins - GW - 07:12		Third period	No scoring
( 19 saves / 20 shots ) Mike Ayers		Goalie stats	Bobby Goepfert ( 27 saves / 29 shots )

March 12	New Hampshire	3 – 4	OT	Providence	Whittemore Center	Recap
(Yandle, Martz) Jacob Micflikier - 09:13 (Aikins, Yandle) Sean Collins - 15:18		First period		09:51 - Chase Watson (Gajda, Goodwin)
No scoring		Second period		17:54 - David Carpenter (Robinson, Lundberg)
(Hemingway, Micflikier) Preston Callander - PP - 04:18		Third period		07:37 - Torry Gajda (Stamoulis, Watson)
No scoring		First overtime period		02:49 - GW - Colin McDonald (McCreary)
( 22 saves / 26 shots ) Mike Ayers		Goalie stats		Bobby Goepfert ( 26 saves / 29 shots )

March 13	New Hampshire	1 – 0	Providence	Whittemore Center	Recap
No Scoring		First period	No scoring
No scoring		Second period	No scoring
(Micflikier, Martz) Preston Callander - GW - 17:22		Third period	No scoring
( 19 saves / 19 shots ) Mike Ayers		Goalie stats	Bobby Goepfert ( 26 saves / 27 shots )

New Hampshire won series 2–1

=== Semifinals ===
==== (2) Maine vs. (8) Boston University ====
March 19	Maine	1 – 0	Boston University	Fleet Center	Recap
No Scoring		First period	No scoring
No scoring		Second period	No scoring
(Jankus) Mike Hamilton - GW - 07:09		Third period	No scoring
( 21 saves / 21 shots ) Jimmy Howard		Goalie stats	Sean Fields ( 31 saves / 32 shots )

==== (3) Massachusetts vs. (4) New Hampshire ====
March 19	Massachusetts	5 – 2	New Hampshire	Fleet Center	Recap
No Scoring		First period	13:41 - Steve Saviano
(Vitek) Greg Mauldin - 10:21		Second period	03:30 - Jacob Micflikier (Horst, Mounsey)
(Regan, Jarman) Peter Trovato - 07:20 (Werner, Jarman) Mike Warner - GW - 14:32 (Lang, Vitek) Thomas Pöck - 17:04 (Pöck) Mike Warner - EN - 18:05		Third period	No scoring
( 27 saves / 29 shots ) Tim Warner		Goalie stats	Mike Ayers ( 28 saves / 32 shots )

=== Championship ===
==== (2) Maine vs. (3) Massachusetts ====
March 20	Maine	2 – 1	3OT	Massachusetts	Fleet Center	Recap
No Scoring		First period		No scoring
(Léviellé) Dustin Penner - PP - 16:24		Second period		No scoring
No scoring		Third period		13:47 - PP - Greg Mauldin (Degon, Pöck)
(Deschamps, Lyall) Ben Murphy - GW - 09:27		Third overtime period		No scoring
( 63 saves / 64 shots ) Jimmy Howard		Goalie stats		Gabe Winer ( 59 saves / 61 shots )

== Tournament awards ==
=== All-Tournament Team ===
- F Greg Mauldin (Massachusetts)
- F Colin Shields (Maine)
- F Mike Warner (Massachusetts)
- D Thomas Pöck (Massachusetts)
- D Prestin Ryan (Maine)
- G Jimmy Howard* (Maine)

* Tournament MVP(s)

=== Tournament Three Stars ===
- 3 Dustin Penner (Maine)
- 2 Thomas Pöck (Massachusetts)
- 1 Jimmy Howard (Maine)
