= List of Maine Black Bears men's ice hockey seasons =

This is a season-by-season list of records compiled by Maine in men's ice hockey.

Maine has won two NCAA Men's Division I Ice Hockey Championships in its history, the most recent of which coming in 1999. In 1993 Maine set a record for wins in a season with 42, a record that still stands as of 2018.

== Season-by-season results ==
Note: GP = Games played, W = Wins, L = Losses, T = Ties

NCAA D-I Champions	NCAA Frozen Four	Conference regular season champions	Conference Playoff Champions

Season	Conference	Regular season (Note: Code explanation; GP—Games Played, W—Wins, L—Losses, T—Tied games, OTW—Overtime Wins, OTL—Overtime Loses, 3/SW—Win in 3 on 3 overtime or shootout, Pts—Points*)														Conference Tournament Results	National Tournament Results
Season	Conference	Conference									Overall					Conference Tournament Results	National Tournament Results
Season	Conference	GP	W	L	T	OTW	OTL	3/SW	Pts*	Finish	GP	W	L	T	%	Conference Tournament Results	National Tournament Results
Cuddy Murphy (1922 — 1923)
1922–23	Independent	–	–	–	–	–	–	–	–	–	5	2	3	0	.400		
Stanley Wallace (1923 — 1924)
1923–24	Independent	–	–	–	–	–	–	–	–	–	12	4	8	0	.333		
Division II
Jack Semler (1977 — 1984)
1977–78	ECAC 2	19	10	9	0	–	–	–	.526	–	25	13	12	0	.520		
1978–79	ECAC 2	22	17	5	0	–	–	–	.773	–	30	22	8	0	.733	Won East Quarterfinal, 4–1 (American International); Lost East Semifinal, 4–7 (Salem State)	
Division I
1979–80	ECAC Hockey	22	10	11	1	–	–	–	.477	9th	32	15	16	1	.484		
1980–81	ECAC Hockey	21	12	9	0	–	–	–	.571	T–4th	34	23	11	0	.676	Lost Quarterfinal, 4–7 (Cornell)	
1981–82	ECAC Hockey	22	3	18	0	–	–	–	.143	17th	29	8	21	0	.276		
1982–83	ECAC Hockey	21	1	20	0	–	–	–	.048	17th	29	5	24	0	.172		
1983–84	ECAC Hockey	21	7	14	0	–	–	–	.333	13th	34	14	20	0	.412		
Shawn Walsh (1984 — 1995)
1984–85	Hockey East	34	8	26	0	–	–	–	16	7th	42	12	29	1	.298	Lost Quarterfinal series, 0–2 (Boston University)	
1985–86	Hockey East	34	8	25	1	–	–	–	17	5th	40	11	28	1	.288	Lost Quarterfinal series, 0–2 (Providence)	
1986–87	Hockey East	32	19	12	1	–	–	–	39	3rd	42	24	16	2	.595	Won Quarterfinal, 5–2 (Providence); Won Semifinal, 5–4 (Lowell); Lost Championship, 2–4 (Boston College)	Lost Quarterfinal series, 5–11 (Michigan State)
1987–88	Hockey East	26	20	4	2	–	–	–	44	1st	44	34	8	2	.795	Won Semifinal series, 2–0 (Providence); Lost Championship, 3–4 (Northeastern)	Won Quarterfinal series, 9–4 (Bowling Green); Lost National semifinal, 3–6 (Lake Superior State); Won Third-place game, 5–2 (Minnesota)
1988–89	Hockey East	26	17	9	0	–	–	–	34	2nd	45	31	14	0	.795	Won Semifinal, 3–2 (OT) (Northeastern); Won Championship, 5–4 (Boston College)	Won Quarterfinal series, 2–1 (Providence); Lost National semifinal, 4–7 (Minnesota); Lost Third-place game, 4–7 (Michigan State)
1989–90	Hockey East	21	14	6	1	–	–	–	29	2nd	46	33	11	2	.739	Won Quarterfinal series, 2–0 (Lowell); Won Semifinal, 3–1 (Boston University); Lost Championship, 3–4 (Boston College)	Won First round series, 2–0 (Bowling Green); Lost Quarterfinal series, 0–2 (Wisconsin)
1990–91	Hockey East	21	15	5	1	–	–	–	31	2nd	43	32	9	2	.767	Won Quarterfinal, 5–3 (Lowell); Won Semifinal, 4–3 (OT) (Northeastern); Lost Championship, 3–4 (OT) (Boston University)	Won Quarterfinal series, 2–0 (Minnesota); Lost National semifinal, 3–5 (Northern Michigan)
1991–92	Hockey East	21	12^	7^	2^	–	–	–	26^	T–2nd^	37	18^	17^	2^	.514^	Won Quarterfinal, 7–0 (Merrimack); Won Semifinal, 7–3 (Boston College); Won Championship, 4–1 (New Hampshire)	Lost Regional semifinal, 2–3 (Michigan State)
1992–93	Hockey East	24	22	1	1	–	–	–	45	1st	45	42	1	2	.956	Won Quarterfinal series, 2–0 (Northeastern); Won Semifinal, 7–5 (Massachusetts–Lowell); Won Championship, 5–2 (Boston University)	Won Regional semifinal, 6–2 (Minnesota); Won National semifinal, 4–3 (OT) (Michigan); Won National Championship, 5–4 (Lake Superior State)
1993–94	Hockey East	24	3†	20†	1†	–	–	–	7†	8th	36	6†	29†	1†	.514†	Lost Quarterfinal series, 0–2 (Boston University)	
1994–95	Hockey East	24	15	3	6	–	–	1	88	T–1st	44	32	6	6	.795	Won Quarterfinal, 7–4 (Massachusetts); Lost Semifinal, 3–7 (Providence); Won Consolation Game, 6–0 (Massachusetts–Lowell)	Won Regional semifinal, 4–2 (Denver); Won National semifinal, 4–3 (3OT) (Michigan); Lost National Championship, 2–6 (Boston University)
Greg Cronin (1995 — 1996)
1995–96	Hockey East	24	14‡	6‡	4‡	–	–	2‡	80‡	3rd	39	26‡	9‡	4‡	.718‡	Won Quarterfinal series, 2–0 (New Hampshire); Won Semifinal, 5–2 (Massachusetts–Lowell); Lost Championship, 2–3 (Providence)	
Shawn Walsh (1996 — 2001)
1996–97	Hockey East	24	16	7	1	–	–	–	33	3rd	35	24	10	1	.700‡	‡	
1997–98	Hockey East	24	10	11	3	–	–	–	23	6th	36	17	15	4	.528	Won Quarterfinal series, 2–0 (New Hampshire); Won Semifinal, 6–2 (Massachusetts–Lowell); Lost Championship, 2–3 (Boston College)	
1998–99	Hockey East	24	17	5	2	–	–	–	36	2nd	41	31	6	4	.805	Won Quarterfinal series, 2–0 (Massachusetts); Lost Semifinal, 2–3 (Boston College)	Won Regional Quarterfinal, 4–2 (Ohio State); Won Regional semifinal, 7–2 (Clarkson); Won National semifinal, 2–1 (OT) (Boston College); Won National Championship, 3–2 (OT) (New Hampshire)
1999–00	Hockey East	24	13	7	4	–	–	–	30	4th	40	27	8	5	.738	Won Quarterfinal series, 2–0 (Providence); Won Semifinal, 4–2 (Boston University); Won Championship, 2–1 (Boston College)	Won Regional semifinal, 5–2 (Michigan); Lost National semifinal, 0–2 (North Dakota)
2000–01	Hockey East	24	12	7	5	–	–	–	29	T–2nd	39	20	12	7	.603	Won Quarterfinal series, 2–0 (Northeastern); Lost Semifinal, 3–4 (Providence)	
Tim Whitehead (2001 — 2013)
2001–02	Hockey East	24	14	5	5	–	–	–	33	T–2nd	44	26	11	7	.670	Won Quarterfinal series, 2–0 (Boston College); Won Semifinal, 4–3 (Boston University); Lost Championship, 1–3 (New Hampshire)	Won Regional Quarterfinal, 4–3 (OT) (Harvard); Won Regional semifinal, 4–3 (Boston University); Won National semifinal, 7–2 (New Hampshire); Lost National Championship, 3–4 (OT) (Minnesota)
2002–03	Hockey East	24	14	6	4	–	–	–	32	3rd	39	24	10	5	.679	Lost Quarterfinal series, 0–2 (Massachusetts)	Lost Regional semifinal, 1–2 (Michigan)
2003–04	Hockey East	24	17	5	2	–	–	–	36	2nd	42	33	8	3	.784	Won Quarterfinal series, 2–0 (Merrimack); Won Semifinal, 1–0 (Boston University); Won Championship, 2–1 (3OT) (Massachusetts)	Won Regional semifinal, 5–4 (Harvard); Won Regional final, 2–1 (OT) (Wisconsin); Won National semifinal, 2–1 (Boston College); Lost National Championship, 0–1 (Denver)
2004–05	Hockey East	24	13	6	5	–	–	–	31	4th	40	20	13	7	.588	Won Quarterfinal series, 2–0 (Massachusetts–Lowell); Lost Semifinal, 1–2 (2OT) (Boston College)	Lost Regional semifinal, 0–1 (OT) (Minnesota)
2005–06	Hockey East	27	17	8	2	–	–	–	36	T–2nd	42	28	12	2	.690	Won Quarterfinal series, 2–0 (Massachusetts–Lowell); Lost Semifinal, 1–4 (Boston College)	Won Regional semifinal, 6–1 (Harvard); Won Regional final, 5–4 (Michigan State); Lost National semifinal, 2–5 (Wisconsin)
2006–07	Hockey East	27	14	12	1	–	–	–	29	T–5th	40	23	15	2	.600	Lost Quarterfinal series, 0–2 (Massachusetts)	Won Regional semifinal, 4–1 (St. Cloud State); Won Regional final, 3–1 (Massachusetts); Lost National semifinal, 2–4 (Michigan State)
2007–08	Hockey East	27	9	15	3	–	–	–	21	9th	34	13	18	3	.426		
2008–09	Hockey East	27	7	17	3	–	–	–	17	8th	39	13	22	4	.385	Lost Quarterfinal series, 1–2 (Boston University)	
2009–10	Hockey East	27	13	12	2	–	–	–	28	T–3rd	39	19	17	3	.526	Won Quarterfinal series, 2–1 (Massachusetts–Lowell); Won Semifinal, 5–2 (Boston University); Lost Championship, 6–7 (OT) (Boston College)	
2010–11	Hockey East	27	14	8	5	–	–	–	33	5th	36	17	12	7	.569	Lost Quarterfinal series, 0–2 (Merrimack)	
2011–12	Hockey East	27	15	10	2	–	–	–	32	4th	40	23	14	3	.613	Won Quarterfinal series, 2–1 (Merrimack); Won Semifinal, 5–3 (Boston University); Lost Championship, 1–4 (Boston College)	Lost Regional semifinal, 2–5 (Minnesota–Duluth)
2012–13	Hockey East	27	7	12	8	–	–	–	22	T–7th	38	11	19	8	.395	Lost Quarterfinal series, 0–2 (Massachusetts–Lowell)	
Red Gendron (2013 — 2021)
2013–14	Hockey East	20	9	8	3	–	–	–	21	6th	35	16	15	4	.514	Won Opening Round, 2–0 (Merrimack); Lost Quarterfinal series, 0–2 (Providence)	
2014–15	Hockey East	22	8	12	2	–	–	–	18	T–9th	39	14	22	3	.397	Lost Opening Round series, 1–2 (Vermont)	
2015–16	Hockey East	22	5	15	2	–	–	–	12	11th	38	8	24	6	.289	Lost Opening Round series, 0–2 (Northeastern)	
2016–17	Hockey East	22	5	15	2	–	–	–	12	11th	36	11	21	4	.361	Lost Opening Round series, 0–2 (Vermont)	
2017–18	Hockey East	24	10	11	3	–	–	–	23	T–5th	38	18	16	4	.526	Won Opening Round series, 2–0 (New Hampshire); Lost Quarterfinal series, 0–2 (Providence)	
2018–19	Hockey East	24	11	9	4	–	–	–	26	6th	36	15	17	4	.472	Lost Quarterfinal series, 0–2 (Northeastern)	
2019–20	Hockey East	24	12	9	3	–	–	–	27	4th	34	18	11	5	.603	Tournament cancelled	
2020–21	Hockey East	24	3	10	2	0	1	2	.311	8th	16	3	11	2	.250	Lost Opening Round, 2–7 (New Hampshire)	
Ben Barr (2021 — Present)
2021–22	Hockey East	24	5	17	2	2	3	1	19	11th	33	7	22	4	.273	Lost Opening Round, 2–6 (Merrimack)	
2022–23	Hockey East	24	9	11	4	1	1	1	32	T–6th	36	15	16	5	.486	Lost Opening Round, 2–4 (Vermont)	
2023–24	Hockey East	24	14	9	1	0	1	0	44	3rd	37	23	12	2	.649	Won Quarterfinal, 5–0 (New Hampshire); Lost Semifinal, 1–4 (Boston University)	Lost Regional Semifinal, 1–3 (Cornell)
2023–24	Hockey East	24	13	5	6	1	1	5	50	2nd	38	24	8	6	.711	Won Quarterfinal, 7–1 (Massachusetts–Lowell); Won Semifinal, 4–3 (2OT) (Northeastern); Won Championship, 5–2 (Connecticut)	Lost Regional Semifinal, 1–5 (Penn State)
Totals											GP	W	L	T	%	Championships	
Regular season											1664	858	635	151	.568	4 Hockey East Championships	
Conference Post-season											110	60	50	0	.545	6 Hockey East tournament championships	
NCAA Post-season											52	30	22	0	.577	20 NCAA Tournament appearances	
Regular season and Post-season Record											1816	948	717	151	.564	2 NCAA Division I National Championships	

* Winning percentage is used when conference schedules are unbalanced.
^ Maine was forced to forfeit 13 games after the season for using an ineligible player.
† Maine was forced to forfeit 14 games during the season for using an ineligible player.
‡ Shawn Walsh was suspended for one year on December 22, 1995 as a result of NCAA investigations into his recruiting practices. Maine was also ineligible to participate in any playoff during the 1996–97 season.
bold and italic are program records
