= 2003 Hockey East men's ice hockey tournament =

2003 Hockey East Men's ice hockey tournament
- Dates: March 6–15, 2003
- Teams: 8
- Finals site: Fleet Center; Boston, Massachusetts
- Champions: New Hampshire (2nd title)
- Winning coach: Dick Umile (2nd title)
- MVP: Sean Fields (Boston University)
- Hockey East Men's Ice Hockey Tournaments

The 2003 Hockey East Men's Ice Hockey Tournament was the 19th tournament in the history of the conference. It was played between March 6 and March 17, 2003. Quarterfinal games were played at home team campus sites, while the final four games were played at the Fleet Center in Boston, Massachusetts, the home venue of the NHL's Boston Bruins. By winning the tournament New Hampshire received the Hockey East's automatic bid to the 2003 NCAA Division I Men's Ice Hockey Tournament.

== Format ==
The tournament featured three rounds of play. The team that finishes ninth in the conference is not eligible for tournament play. In the first round, the first and eighth seeds, the second and seventh seeds, the third seed and sixth seeds, and the fourth seed and fifth seeds played a best-of-three with the winner advancing to the semifinals. In the semifinals, the highest and lowest seeds and second highest and second lowest seeds play a single-elimination game, with the winner advancing to the championship game. The tournament champion receives an automatic bid to the 2003 NCAA Division I Men's Ice Hockey Tournament.

== Conference standings ==
Note: GP = Games played; W = Wins; L = Losses; T = Ties; PTS = Points; GF = Goals For; GA = Goals Against

2002–03 Hockey East standings
	Conference							Overall					
	GP	W	L	T	PTS	GF	GA	GP	W	L	T	GF	GA
#3 New Hampshire†*	24	15	5	4	34	84	55	42	28	8	6	156	96
#8 Boston College†	24	16	6	2	34	97	55	39	24	11	4	149	97
#9 Maine	24	14	6	4	32	81	61	39	24	10	5	140	91
Providence	24	12	9	3	27	76	71	36	19	14	3	126	104
#7 Boston University	24	13	10	1	27	78	66	42	25	14	3	143	112
Massachusetts	24	10	14	0	20	60	80	37	19	17	1	119	125
Merrimack	24	7	13	4	18	59	80	36	12	18	6	92	116
Massachusetts–Lowell	24	4	16	4	12	63	95	36	11	20	5	110	142
Northeastern	24	5	17	2	12	54	89	34	10	21	3	83	115
Championship: New Hampshire † indicates conference regular season champion * indicates conference tournament champion Final rankings: USA Today/American Hockey Magazine Poll Top 15 Poll

== Bracket ==
Quarterfinals; March 6–8
1	New Hampshire	8	8	—
8	Massachusetts-Lowell	4	4	—
2	Boston College	4	2	—
7	Merrimack	1	1	—
(Pairings are reseeded after the first round)
3	Maine	3	2	–
6	Massachusetts	5	4	–
4	Providence	4	1	–
5	Boston University	5*	7	–

Semifinals; March 14
1	New Hampshire	5
6	Massachusetts	4
2	Boston College	5
5	Boston University	6**

Championship; March 15
1	New Hampshire	1*
5	Boston University	0

Note: * denotes overtime period(s)

=== Quarterfinals ===
==== (1) New Hampshire vs. (8) Massachusetts-Lowell ====
March 7	New Hampshire	8 – 4	Massachusetts-Lowell	Whittemore Center	Recap
(Hemingway) Lanny Gare - 10:29 (Lubesnick, Scott) Tim Horst - 18:12		First period	No scoring
(Prudden) Colin Hemingway - 00:17 (Saviano) Jim Abbott - 05:48 (Callander, Yandle) Jim Abbott - GW - 13:52		Second period	07:20 - Ed McGrane (Green, Martin); 17:03 - Geoff Schomogyi (Strome, Tormey); 19:24 - Mark Concannon (Domish)
(Callander) Jim Abbott - 01:28 (Yandle, Saviano) Sean Collins - 03:58 (Lubesnick, Teplitsky) Steve Saviano - 19:54		Third period	15:58 - Stephen Slonina (Godoy, Reed)
Mike Ayers ( 25 saves / 29 shots )		Goalie stats	Dominic Smart ( 16 saves / 23 shots ) / Chris Davidson ( 3 saves / 4 shots )

March 8	New Hampshire	8 – 4	Massachusetts-Lowell	Whittemore Center	Recap
(Stafford, Foley) Tyler Scott - 01:44 (Saviano, Aikins) Sean Collins - PP - 13:25 (Stafford, Gare) Jim Abbott - PP - 17:06		First period	02:14 - Mark Concannon (Slonina); 12:35 - Darryl Green (Slonina, Godoy)
(Stafford, Abbott) Colin Hemingway - PP - 09:46 (Foley) Robbie Barker - GW - 15:41		Second period	No scoring
(Saviano, Aikins) Kevin Truelson - PP - 08:44 (Callander, Ayers) Justin Aikins - 12:14 (Gare, Stafford) Colin Hemingway - PP - 16:07		Third period	00:24 - Ed McGrane (Reed); 04:41 - Darryl Green (Reed, O'Brien)
Mike Ayers ( 28 saves / 32 shots )		Goalie stats	Dominic Smart ( 29 saves / 37 shots )

New Hampshire won series 2–0

==== (2) Boston College vs. (7) Merrimack ====
March 7	Boston College	4 – 1	Merrimack	Conte Forum	Recap
(Spina, Harrold) Ryan Shannon - PP - 16:28 (Eaves, Forrest) Ben Eaves - GW - 18:58		First period	No scoring
No scoring		Second period	No scoring
(Alberts, Spina) Ryan Shannon - 15:16 (Spina, Shannon) Andrew Alberts - PP - 18:13		Third period	14:58 - Brent Gough (LaLonde)
Matti Kaltiainen ( 12 saves / 13 shots )		Goalie stats	Joe Exter ( 29 saves / 31 shots ) / Casey Guenther ( 2 saves / 4 shots )

March 8	Boston College	2 – 1	Merrimack	Conte Forum	Recap
(D'Arpino, Hennes) Justin Dziama - 07:25		First period	07:04 - PP - Brent Gough (Schmidt, Johnson)
No scoring		Second period	No scoring
(Voce) J. D. Forrest - GW - 19:42		Third period	No scoring
Matti Kaltiainen ( 17 saves / 18 shots )		Goalie stats	Casey Guenther ( 27 saves / 29 shots )

Boston College won series 2–0

==== (3) Maine vs. (6) Massachusetts ====
March 6	Maine	3 – 5	Massachusetts	Alfond Arena	Recap
(Lawson, Nault) Martin Kariya - PP - 08:07		First period	12:19 - Dusty Demianiuk (Solon); 13:51 - Matt Anderson (Turner, Mauldin)
(Lynch, Liščák) John Ronan - 09:47		Second period	02:54 - Peter Trovato (Hanson, Solon)
(Heisten, Barnes) Gray Shaneberger - 01:36		Third period	01:54 - GW - Stephen Jacobs (Vitek); 19:14 - EN - Greg Mauldin (Pöck, Warner)
Jimmy Howard ( 9 saves / 12 shots ) / Frank Doyle ( 13 saves / 14 shots )		Goalie stats	Gabe Winer ( 23 saves / 26 shots )

March 7	Maine	2 – 4	Massachusetts	Alfond Arena	Recap
No Scoring		First period	03:01 - Thomas Pöck; 11:18 - Chris Capraro (Warner, Turner); 16:24 - GW - Stephen Werner (Pöck, Lang)
(Liščák, Ryan) Todd Jackson - 12:48		Second period	No scoring
(Shields, Moore) Derek Damon - 05:47		Third period	11:55 - PP - Mike Warner (Pöck)
Jimmy Howard ( 6 saves / 9 shots ) / Frank Doyle ( 10 saves / 11 shots )		Goalie stats	Gabe Winer ( 28 saves / 30 shots )

Massachusetts won series 2–0

==== (4) Providence vs. (5) Boston University ====
March 7	Providence	4 – 5	OT	Boston University	Schneider Arena	Recap
(Wood) Jon DiSalvatore - PP - 04:03 (DiSalvatore) Peter Fregoe - PP - 13:59		First period		02:56 - Ken Magowan (Redlihs, Maiser); 12:35 - Ken Magowan (Zancanaro)
(Goodwin, Wood) Chris Chaput - PP - 07:30		Second period		12:48 - Frantisek Skladany (Meyer, McConnell)
Jon DiSalvatore - 00:48		Third period		04:35 - Ken Magowan
No scoring		First overtime period		08:03 - GW - Bryan Miller (Laliberte)
Nolan Schaefer ( 41 saves / 46 shots )		Goalie stats		Sean Fields ( 26 saves / 30 shots )

March 8	Providence	1 – 7	Boston University	Schneider Arena	Recap
No Scoring		First period	08:40 - SH - Mark Mullen (McConnell); 09:57 - GW - John Laliberte
No scoring		Second period	No scoring
(DiSalvatore, Fregoe) Devin Rask - PP - 07:14		Third period	01:21 - Frantisek Skladany (Cronin); 05:34 - Brien McConnell (Redlihs, Mullen); 13:21 - PP - David Van der Gulik (Collins); 13:56 - PP - Dan Spang (Van der Gulik); 17:50 - PP - Brian Collins (Van der Gulik, Sabo)
Nolan Schaefer ( 22 saves / 29 shots )		Goalie stats	Sean Fields ( 29 saves / 30 shots )

Boston University won series 2–0

=== Semifinals ===
==== (1) New Hampshire vs. (6) Massachusetts ====
March 14	New Hampshire	4 – 3	Massachusetts	Fleet Center	Recap
(Truelson, Saviano) Tim Horst - PP - 17:06 (Gare, Mounsey) Joshua Prudden - 18:08		First period	No scoring
No scoring		Second period	03:24 - Stephen Werner (Kuiper); 14:40 - PP - Greg Mauldin (Lang, Werner)
(Foley) Tyler Scott - 03:17 (Martz) Steve Saviano - 06:43 (Aikins, Truelson) Preston Callander - GW - 17:01		Third period	09:40 - Stephen Werner (Degon, Pöck); 09:50 - Tim Turner (Warner)
Mike Ayers ( 26 saves / 30 shots )		Goalie stats	Gabe Winer ( 23 saves / 28 shots )

==== (2) Boston College vs. (5) Boston University ====
March 14	Boston College	5 – 6	2OT	Boston University	Fleet Center	Recap
(Gionta, Hennes) Ned Havern - 09:03		First period		00:43 - Brian Collins (Whitney)
(Shannon, Harrold) Chris Collins - 01:00 (Adams) Ty Hennes - 04:07		Second period		02:08 - Mike Bussoli (Laliberte); 03:39 - Brad Zancanaro (Magowan, Miller); 16:39 - PP - Justin Maiser (Bussoli, Whitney)
(Forrest, Eaves) Tony Voce - PP - 07:18 (Gionta, Eaves) Tony Voce - 04:07		Third period		16:38 - Justin Maiser (Spang)
No scoring		Second overtime period		05:00 - Justin Maiser (McConnell)
Matti Kaltiainen ( 29 saves / 35 shots )		Goalie stats		Sean Fields ( 46 saves / 51 shots )

=== Championship ===
==== (1) New Hampshire vs. (5) Boston University ====
March 15	New Hampshire	1 – 0	OT	Boston University	Fleet Center	Recap
No Scoring		First period		No scoring
No scoring		Second period		No scoring
No scoring		Third period		No scoring
Tyson Teplitsky - GW - 11:43		First overtime period		No scoring
Mike Ayers ( 24 saves / 24 shots )		Goalie stats		Sean Fields ( 40 saves / 41 shots )

== Tournament awards ==
=== All-Tournament Team ===
- F Justin Maiser (Boston University)
- F Steve Saviano (New Hampshire)
- F Stephen Werner (Massachusetts)
- D Garrett Stafford (New Hampshire)
- D Thomas Pöck (Massachusetts)
- G Sean Fields* (Boston University)

* Tournament MVP(s)

=== Tournament Three Stars ===
- 3 Stephen Werner (Massachusetts)
- 2 Steve Saviano (New Hampshire)
- 1 Sean Fields (Boston University)
