= 2002 Hockey East men's ice hockey tournament =

2002 Hockey East Men's ice hockey tournament
- Dates: March 7–16, 2002
- Teams: 8
- Finals site: Fleet Center; Boston, Massachusetts
- Champions: New Hampshire (1st title)
- Winning coach: Dick Umile (1st title)
- MVP: Darren Haydar (New Hampshire)
- Hockey East Men's Ice Hockey Tournaments

The 2002 Hockey East Men's Ice Hockey Tournament was the 18th tournament in the history of the conference. It was played between March 7 and March 16, 2002. Quarterfinal games were played at home team campus sites, while the final four games were played at the Fleet Center in Boston, Massachusetts, the home venue of the NHL's Boston Bruins. By winning the tournament New Hampshire received the Hockey East's automatic bid to the 2002 NCAA Division I Men's Ice Hockey Tournament.

== Format ==
The tournament featured three rounds of play. The team that finishes ninth in the conference is not eligible for tournament play. In the first round, the first and eighth seeds, the second and seventh seeds, the third seed and sixth seeds, and the fourth seed and fifth seeds played a best-of-three with the winner advancing to the semifinals. In the semifinals, the highest and lowest seeds and second highest and second lowest seeds play a single-elimination game, with the winner advancing to the championship game. The tournament champion receives an automatic bid to the 2002 NCAA Division I Men's Ice Hockey Tournament.

== Conference standings ==
Note: GP = Games played; W = Wins; L = Losses; T = Ties; PTS = Points; GF = Goals For; GA = Goals Against

2001–02 Hockey East standings
	Conference							Overall					
	GP	W	L	T	PTS	GF	GA	GP	W	L	T	GF	GA
#3 New Hampshire†*	24	17	4	3	37	103	49	40	30	7	3	184	102
#6 Boston University	24	15	6	3	33	80	65	38	25	10	3	141	110
#2 Maine	24	14	5	5	33	99	62	44	26	11	7	186	116
#14 Massachusetts–Lowell	24	12	9	3	27	70	67	38	22	13	3	121	91
Northeastern	24	11	11	2	24	69	74	39	19	17	3	123	116
Boston College	24	10	13	1	21	73	81	38	18	18	2	119	116
Providence	24	8	13	3	19	68	82	38	13	20	5	115	129
Merrimack	24	6	16	2	14	54	87	36	11	23	2	101	133
Massachusetts	24	3	19	2	8	45	94	34	8	24	2	70	125
Championship: New Hampshire † indicates conference regular season champion * indicates conference tournament champion Final rankings: USA Today/American Hockey Magazine Poll Top 15 Poll

== Bracket ==
Quarterfinals; March 7–9
1	New Hampshire	6	5*	—
8	Merrimack	2	4	—
2	Boston University	3	4	—
7	Providence	2	2	—
(Pairings are reseeded after the first round)
3	Maine	7	4	–
6	Boston College	3	2	–
4	Massachusetts-Lowell	5	2	3
5	Northeastern	2	4	1

Semifinals; March 15
1	New Hampshire	4
4	Massachusetts-Lowell	3
2	Boston University	3
3	Maine	4

Championship; March 16
1	New Hampshire	3
3	Maine	1

Note: * denotes overtime period(s)

=== Quarterfinals ===
==== (1) New Hampshire vs. (8) Merrimack ====
March 8	New Hampshire	6 – 2	Merrimack	Whittemore Center	Recap
(Gare, Hemingway) Joshua Prudden - 08:50		First period	No scoring
(Busch, Truelson) Tyson Teplitsky - 01:45 (Gare, Prudden) Colin Hemingway - GW - 19:35		Second period	09:18 - Alex Sikatchev (Aquino)
(Horst, Martz) Justin Aikins - 05:41 (Teplitsky, Hemingway) Lanny Gare - 09:20 (Hemingway, Stafford) Darren Haydar - PP - 18:42		Third period	09:18 - Alex Sikatchev (Aquino)
Matt Carney ( 23 saves / 25 shots )		Goalie stats	Joe Exter ( 42 saves / 48 shots )

March 9	New Hampshire	5 – 4	OT	Merrimack	Whittemore Center	Recap
No Scoring		First period		04:37 - Ryan Kiley (Rose, Torretti); 13:42 - Ryan Cordeiro (Crusco)
(Hemingway, Stafford) Darren Haydar - PP - 08:47 (Busch, Gare) Tim Horst - 10:06 (Hemingway, Stafford) Darren Haydar - PP - 10:36		Second period		00:33 - PP - Alex Sikatchev (Lauze, Aquino); 18:41 - Alex Sikatchev (Aquino, Parillo)
(Horst, Foley) Ed Caron - 05:59		Third period		No scoring
(Stafford, Haydar) Steve Saviano - GW - 05:59		First overtime period		No scoring
Mike Ayers ( 33 saves / 37 shots )		Goalie stats		Joe Exter ( 62 saves / 67 shots )

New Hampshire won series 2–0

==== (2) Boston University vs. (7) Providence ====
March 8	Boston University	3 – 2	Providence	Walter Brown Arena	Recap
(Klema, Dyment) Justin Maiser - PP - 15:41		First period	No scoring
No scoring		Second period	08:43 - Devin Rask (DiSalvatore); 17:11 - Stephen Wood (Rask, DiSalvatore)
(Whitney, Dyment) David Klema - PP - 10:38 (Pandolfo, Collins) Mark Mullen - GW - 14:32		Third period	No scoring
Sean Fields ( 25 saves / 27 shots )		Goalie stats	Nolan Schaefer ( 37 saves / 40 shots )

March 9	Boston University	4 – 2	Providence	Walter Brown Arena	Recap
No Scoring		First period	12:33 - David Carpentier (Suderman, Wood)
(Pandolfo, Mullen) Brian Collins - 02:38 (Sabo, McConnell) Jack Baker - 19:20		Second period	04:55 - PP - Jon DiSalvatore (Fregoe, Rask)
(Johnson, Meyer) Ken Magowan - GW - 01:28 (Skladany, Johnson) Ken Magowan - 06:53		Third period	No scoring
Sean Fields ( 25 saves / 27 shots )		Goalie stats	Nolan Schaefer ( 44 saves / 48 shots )

Boston University won series 2–0

==== (3) Maine vs. (6) Boston College ====
March 7	Maine	7 – 3	Boston College	Alfond Arena	Recap
(Ronan) Ben Murphy - 08:55 (Reimann, Heisten) Colin Shields - 11:13 (Schutte, Metcalf) Martin Kariya - PP - 16:02		First period	05:57 - Ryan Murphy (Dolinar, Havern)
(Metcalf, Schutte) Martin Kariya - GW PP - 01:55 (Jackson, Liscak) Gray Shaneberger - 15:55		Second period	No scoring
(Ronan) Chris Heisten - 05:09 (Dimitrakos, Schutte) Lucas Lawson - 10:17		Third period	00:20 - Ben Eaves (Voce, Shannon); 04:30 - PP - Ned Havern (Walker, Kelleher)
Mike Morrison ( 17 saves / 20 shots )		Goalie stats	Tim Kelleher ( 38 saves / 45 shots )

March 8	Maine	4 – 2	Boston College	Alfond Arena	Recap
(Dimitrakos) Prestin Ryan - 05:59		First period	02:23 - Tony Voce (Eaves)
(Shields, Murphy) Michael Schutte - 06:12 (Shields) Chris Heisten - GW - 10:50		Second period	No scoring
Lucas Lawson - EN PP - 19:18		Third period	18:32 - SH - Tony Voce (Eaves)
Matt Yeats ( 26 saves / 28 shots )		Goalie stats	Matti Kaltiainen ( 19 saves / 22 shots )

Maine won series 2–0

==== (4) Massachusetts-Lowell vs. (5) Northeastern ====
March 7	Massachusetts-Lowell	5 – 2	Northeastern	Tsongas Arena	Recap
(Concannon, Allison) Anders Strome - 17:44		First period	No scoring
(Meunier, Domish) Yorick Treille - 18:18		Second period	12:15 - Tim Judy (Ryan, Guerriero)
(Storm, Concannon) Anders Strome - GW - 10:54 (Schomogyi, Storm) Darryl Green - 11:28 (Allison) Ed McGrane - EN - 19:45		Third period	12:15 - Mike Ryan (Levesque, Fahey)
Jimi St. John ( 22 saves / 24 shots )		Goalie stats	Keni Gibson ( 18 saves / 22 shots )

March 8	Massachusetts-Lowell	2 – 4	Northeastern	Tsongas Arena	Recap
No Scoring		First period	12:54 - Mike Ryan (Levesque, Guerriero); 19:24 - PP - Chris Lynch (Fahey, Ryan)
(Hay, Treille) Ed McGrane - PP - 05:44 (Gustafson, Green) Mark Concannon - PP - 15:37		Second period	11:19 - GW - Eric Ortlip (Herriman, Lynch)
No scoring		Third period	19:48 - EN - Leon Hayward (Fahey)
Jimi St. John ( 10 saves / 13 shots ) / Cam McCormick ( 13 saves / 13 shots )		Goalie stats	Jason Braun ( 31 saves / 33 shots )

March 9	Massachusetts-Lowell	3 – 1	Northeastern	Tsongas Arena	Recap
No Scoring		First period	08:07 - Willie Levesque (Guerriero, Ryan)
(Meunier, Hay) Yorick Treille - 00:19		Second period	No scoring
(McGrane) Baptiste Amar - GW - 05:55 (Concannon, Allison) Stephen Slonina - EN - 19:48		Third period	No scoring
Cam McCormick ( 22 saves / 23 shots )		Goalie stats	Jason Braun ( 32 saves / 34 shots )

Massachusetts-Lowell won series 2–1

=== Semifinals ===
==== (1) New Hampshire vs. (4) Massachusetts-Lowell ====
March 15	New Hampshire	4 – 3	Massachusetts-Lowell	Fleet Center	Recap
(Collins, Horst) Darren Haydar - 04:52		First period	13:18 - Josh Reed (Concannon, Strome); 16:37 - Mark Concannon
(Martz, Scott) Kevin Truelson - 11:53 (Haydar) Steve Saviano - 14:03		Second period	No scoring
(Gare, Hemingway) Mick Mounsey - GW - 00:37		Third period	09:46 - Ed McGrane (Green, Fontas)
Cam McCormick ( 12 saves / 15 shots ) / Jimi St. John ( 12 saves / 13 shots )		Goalie stats	Matt Carney ( 26 saves / 29 shots )

==== (2) Boston University vs. (3) Maine ====
March 15	Boston University	3 – 4	Maine	Fleet Center	Recap
(Pandolfo, Mullen) Brian Collins - 07:30 (Whitney, Dyment) Brian Collins - 09:11		First period	13:04 - Colin Shields (Reimann)
(Johnson) Chris Dyment - PP - 17:37		Second period	01:08 - Gray Shaneberger (Nault, Liscak); 02:24 - Tom Reimann (Ryan, Heisten)
No scoring		Third period	06:59 - GW PP - Niko Dimitrakos (Schutte, Metcalf)
Sean Fields ( 25 saves / 29 shots )		Goalie stats	Matt Yeats ( 27 saves / 30 shots )

=== Championship ===
==== (1) New Hampshire vs. (3) Maine ====
March 16	New Hampshire	3 – 1	Maine	Fleet Center	Recap
(Truelson, Gare) Jim Abbott - PP - 08:16		First period	No scoring
No scoring		Second period	06:51 - PP - Colin Shields (Metcalf, Shields)
(Haydar, Hemingway) Sean Collins - GW PP - 01:16 (Haydar) Steve Saviano - 16:12		Third period	No scoring
Mike Ayers ( 31 saves / 32 shots )		Goalie stats	Matt Yeats ( 25 saves / 28 shots )

== Tournament awards ==
=== All-Tournament Team ===
- F Mark Concannon (Massachusetts-Lowell)
- F Darren Haydar* (New Hampshire)
- F Colin Hemingway (New Hampshire)
- D Peter Metcalf (Maine)
- D Garrett Stafford (New Hampshire)
- G Matt Yeats (Maine)

* Tournament MVP(s)
