= Darren Haydar =

Canadian ice hockey player (born 1979)

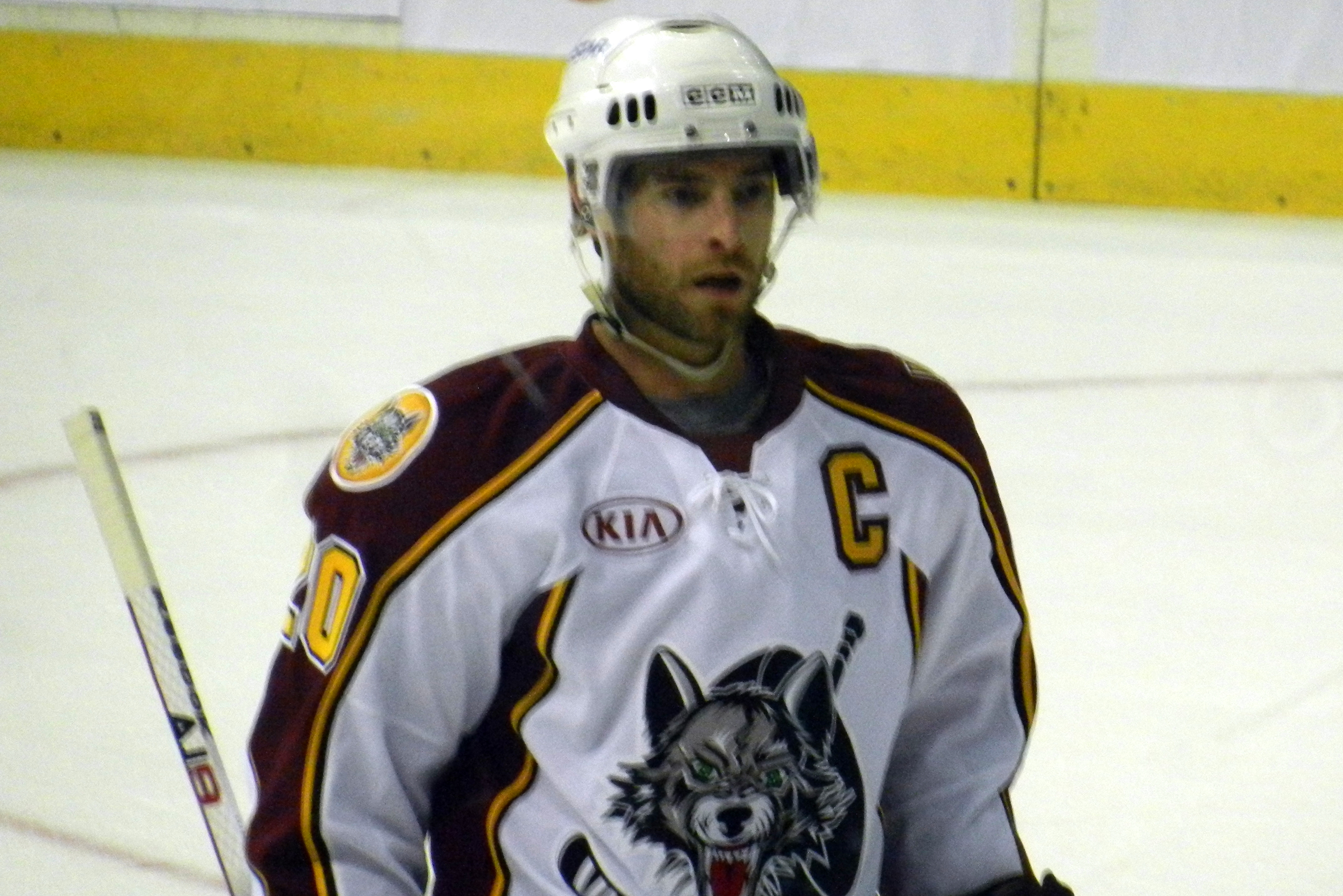
- Haydar with the Chicago Wolves in 2012
- Born: October 22, 1979 (age 46) Milton, Ontario, Canada
- Height: 5 ft 9 in (175 cm)
- Weight: 170 lb (77 kg; 12 st 2 lb)
- Position: Right wing
- Shot: Right
- Played for: Nashville Predators; Atlanta Thrashers; Colorado Avalanche; EHC München; KHL Medveščak Zagreb; EC VSV
- NHL draft: 248th overall, 1999; Nashville Predators
- Playing career: 2002–2020

Darren J. Haydar (born October 22, 1979) is a Canadian former professional ice hockey winger. Haydar was selected by the Nashville Predators in the ninth round (248th overall) of the 1999 NHL entry draft. He is one of the top AHL players of all-time, having won two Calder Cup championships and is the AHL’s all-time leader in playoff goals (63), assists (80) and points (143). Despite his prowess in the AHL, Haydar played little in the NHL, scoring only a single goal and eight points over 23 games.

== Playing career ==
Prior to turning professional Haydar played two years with the Milton Merchants of the Junior A Ontario Provincial Hockey League, where he established league records for goals (71) and points (140) in a season. He then spent four years (1998–2002) for the University of New Hampshire, scoring 219 points with 102 goals. In 2002, he was named a First Team All-American and was Hockey East Player of the Year.

He was drafted 248th overall by Nashville Predators in the 1999 NHL entry draft. On September 11, 2002, Haydar signed a three-year entry-level contract with the Predators. He spent almost all of his Predators career at their farm team as a standout with the Milwaukee Admirals of the American Hockey League, only playing twice for the Predators, both in the 2002–03 NHL season. He helped the Admirals win the Calder Cup in the 2003–04 season.

Haydar was signed by the Atlanta Thrashers as a free agent on July 4, 2006. He was assigned to affiliate the Chicago Wolves for the 2006–07 season. On December 23, 2006, Haydar picked up a point in his 32nd consecutive game, breaking the record for the longest AHL scoring streak. The stick used by Haydar as well as the hockey puck involved in the record-breaking point were preserved in the Hockey Hall of Fame in Toronto. He went on to notch a point in 39 consecutive games, tallying 79 points during the streak. At season's end Haydar finished with 122 points in 73 games. He was named in the AHL's First All-Star Team and won the Les Cunningham Award for being the AHL's most valuable player.

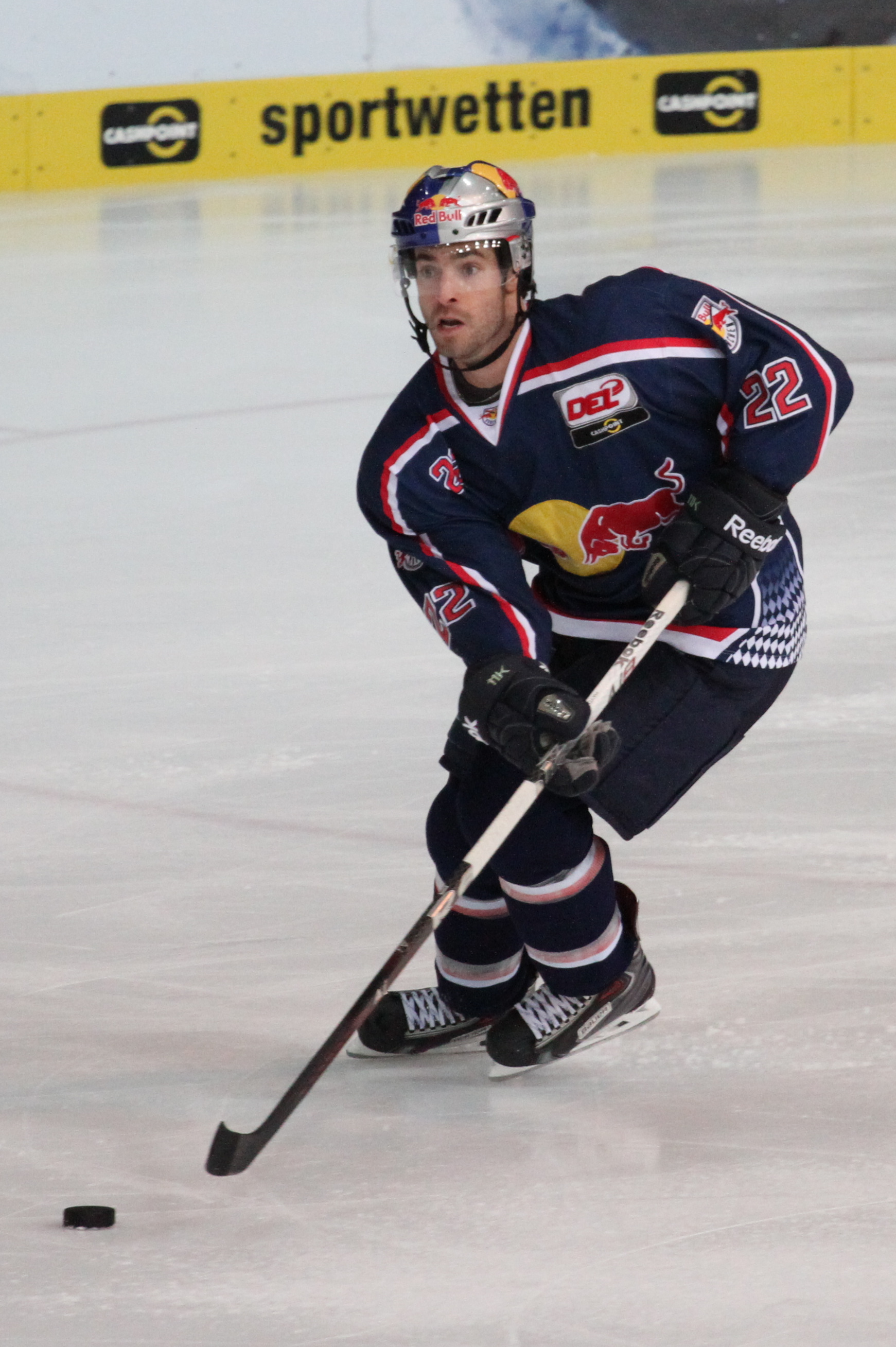
Haydar during his tenure with EHC München.

In the 2007–08 season, Haydar again was relied heavily upon with the Wolves, and was instrumental in helping the Wolves win the Calder Cup, his second. Darren also played as a reserve forward with the Thrashers and scored his first NHL goal on October 13, 2007, against Martin Brodeur in a 6-5 loss to the New Jersey Devils.

For the 2008–09 season, Haydar was signed by the Detroit Red Wings on July 23, 2008. He was assigned to and named captain of affiliate the Grand Rapids Griffins, leading the Griffins in scoring with 80 points in 79 games. As a result, was named in the 2008–09 AHL's Second All-Star Team.

On July 4, 2009, Haydar was signed by the Colorado Avalanche to a one-year contract. Haydar was reassigned by the Avalanche to affiliate, the Lake Erie Monsters, prior to the 2009–10 season. While leading the Monsters in scoring, Darren was named to play in the 2010 AHL All-Star game but missed the game due to injury. Upon his return Haydar was recalled by the injury hit Avalanche on February 10, 2010. He made his Avalanche debut and played his first NHL game since 2007 on the same day in a 4-3 overtime win against the Thrashers. Haydar was returned to the Monsters and in the last game of the season he recorded an assist, to become the 43rd player in history to reach 600 points.

A free agent at season's end, Haydar signed an AHL contract to return to the team he formerly captained, the Chicago Wolves on July 28, 2010. In 2013, as part of the Milwaukee Admirals celebrating their 35th season, Haydar was voted by fans as the 3rd greatest Milwaukee Admiral of all time.

After three further seasons with the Wolves, Haydar left North America for the first time in his career and signed a one-year contract in Europe with EHC München of the DEL on July 25, 2013.

In 2013, he was added to the Team Canada roster for the 2013 Spengler Cup. Haydar finished in a tie with Byron Ritchie for the team scoring lead with a pair of goals and four assists.

Upon completing a single season in the DEL on June 9, 2014, he signed a one-year contract, along with former Wolves teammate, Jason Krog, in the Kontinental Hockey League with Croatian club, KHL Medveščak Zagreb. In the 2014–15 season, having recorded just 1 assist in 4 games, Haydar opted to leave the club. With Krog following suit, they both signed a try-out contract with Austrian club, EC VSV, on October 2, 2014. After showing early scoring touch in Villach, Krog and Haydar both opted to remain signing a one-year contract on October 15, 2014.

In the off-season, Haydar left Villach as a free agent and returned to play for a second stint in Germany after signing with Lausitzer Füchse of the DEL2 on September 28, 2015.

Suffering an off-season training back injury, Haydar opted to sit out the 2016–17 season, having recently returned to Milton after three seasons in Europe and in the midst of making plans for his post-playing future. He later concluded his professional career in accepting a position as a sales representative at a real estate entity in Milton, Ontario, working alongside his older brother Ryan, who was also a hockey player but now has officially retired.

In 2018, Haydar was inducted into his hometown Milton Sports Hall of Fame along with his teammates on the 1996-98 Milton Merchant teams. In 2019, Haydar was inducted into the same hall as a standalone athlete inductee. In 2020, the Milwaukee Admirals retired Haydar's jersey and celebrate his accomplishments with a bobblehead night.

== Personal ==
After first experiencing symptoms in 2012, Haydar was diagnosed over a year later with multiple sclerosis and has organized a charity golf tournament in support of the MS Society of Canada’s Hamilton-Halton Chapter since 2017. He is married to Sara, who is a throat cancer survivor, and he has three sons. He works in real estate with his older brother, Ryan.

== Career statistics ==
=== Regular season and playoffs ===
			Regular season					Playoffs
Season	Team	League	GP	G	A	Pts	PIM	GP	G	A	Pts	PIM
1995–96	Milton Merchants	OPJHL	6	1	2	3	4	—	—	—	—	—
1996–97	Milton Merchants	OPJHL	51	32	68	100	68	—	—	—	—	—
1997–98	Milton Merchants	OPJHL	51	71	69	140	65	—	—	—	—	—
1998–99	University of New Hampshire	HE	41	31	30	61	34	—	—	—	—	—
1999–00	University of New Hampshire	HE	38	22	19	41	42	—	—	—	—	—
2000–01	University of New Hampshire	HE	39	18	23	41	38	—	—	—	—	—
2001–02	University of New Hampshire	HE	40	31	45	76	28	—	—	—	—	—
2002–03	Milwaukee Admirals	AHL	75	29	46	75	36	6	1	4	5	2
2002–03	Nashville Predators	NHL	2	0	0	0	0	—	—	—	—	—
2003–04	Milwaukee Admirals	AHL	79	22	37	59	35	22	11	15	26	10
2004–05	Milwaukee Admirals	AHL	59	24	26	50	42	7	3	4	7	14
2005–06	Milwaukee Admirals	AHL	80	35	57	92	50	21	18	17	35	18
2006–07	Chicago Wolves	AHL	73	41	81	122	55	15	10	14	24	14
2006–07	Atlanta Thrashers	NHL	4	0	0	0	0	—	—	—	—	—
2007–08	Chicago Wolves	AHL	51	19	39	58	52	24	12	15	27	8
2007–08	Atlanta Thrashers	NHL	16	1	7	8	2	—	—	—	—	—
2008–09	Grand Rapids Griffins	AHL	79	31	49	80	26	10	4	7	11	4
2009–10	Lake Erie Monsters	AHL	66	23	41	64	60	—	—	—	—	—
2009–10	Colorado Avalanche	NHL	1	0	0	0	0	—	—	—	—	—
2010–11	Chicago Wolves	AHL	77	27	47	74	60	—	—	—	—	—
2011–12	Chicago Wolves	AHL	70	21	36	57	32	5	4	4	8	0
2012–13	Chicago Wolves	AHL	71	20	37	57	58	—	—	—	—	—
2013–14	EHC München	DEL	44	13	22	35	22	2	1	1	2	12
2014–15	KHL Medveščak Zagreb	KHL	4	0	1	1	0	—	—	—	—	—
2014–15	EC VSV	EBEL	45	23	21	44	26	5	1	0	1	20
2015–16	Lausitzer Füchse	DEL2	42	21	16	37	60	—	—	—	—	—
2017–18	Dundas Real McCoys	ACH	13	7	17	24	4	2	1	0	1	0
2018–19	Dundas Real McCoys	ACH	12	4	15	19	2	5	3	3	6	0
2019–20	Dundas Real McCoys	ACH	4	5	2	7	0	2	0	0	0	10
AHL totals			780	292	496	788	506	110	63	80	143	70
NHL totals			23	1	7	8	2	—	—	—	—	—

== Awards and honors ==
OPJHL

Award	Year(s)
First All-Star Team	1998
Player of the Year	1998

NCAA

Award	Year(s)
Rookie of the Year	1999
All-Hockey East Rookie Team	1998–99
All-Hockey East Second Team	1998–99, 1999–00
All-Hockey East First Team	2001–02
AHCA East First-Team All-American	2001–02
Hockey East All-Tournament Team	2002
Player of the Year	2002

AHL

Award	Year(s)
All-Rookie Team	2003
Dudley "Red" Garrett Memorial Award (Rookie of the Year)	2003
First All-Star Team	2007
John B. Sollenberger Trophy (Top Scorer)	2007
Les Cunningham Award (MVP)	2007
Second All-Star Team	2009, 2011
AHL Hall of Fame	2020

== Records ==
- AHL All-Time Playoff goals record- 59
- AHL All-Time Playoff assist record- 76
- AHL All-Time Playoff points record- 135

Awards and achievements
Preceded by Brian Gionta	Hockey East Rookie of the Year; 1998–99	Succeeded by Rick DiPietro
Preceded by Brian Gionta	Hockey East Player of the Year; 2001–02	Succeeded by Mike Ayers / Ben Eaves
Preceded by Brian Gionta	Hockey East Scoring Champion; 2001–02	Succeeded by Ben Eaves
Preceded by Chuck Kobasew	William Flynn Tournament Most Valuable Player; 2002	Succeeded by Sean Fields
