= Thomas Pöck =

Austrian former hockey player

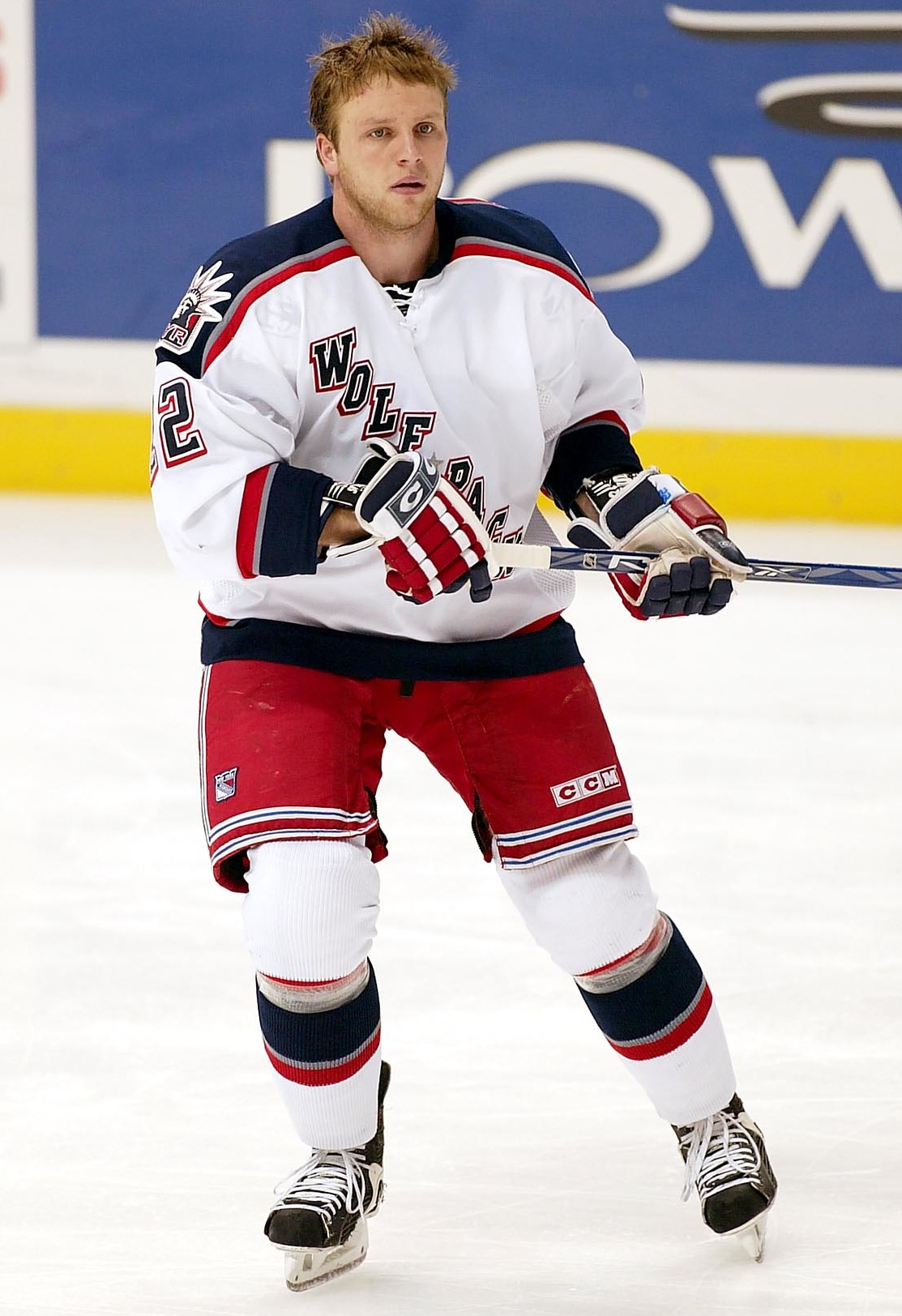
- Pöck with the Hartford Wolf Pack in 2005
- Born: 2 December 1981 (age 44) Klagenfurt, Austria
- Height: 6 ft 1 in (185 cm)
- Weight: 210 lb (95 kg; 15 st 0 lb)
- Position: Defence
- Shot: Left
- Played for: EC KAC; New York Rangers; New York Islanders; Rapperswil-Jona Lakers; Modo Hockey; Graz 99ers
- National team: Austria
- NHL draft: Undrafted
- Playing career: 2004–2016

Thomas Dietmar Pöck (born 2 December 1981) is an Austrian former professional ice hockey defenceman. He played in the National Hockey League with the New York Rangers and the New York Islanders. He is also an avid golfer, and is commonly referred to as "Twilight Tommy"

== Playing career ==
As a youth, Pöck played in the 1994 Quebec International Pee-Wee Hockey Tournament with a team from Austria.

Pöck was a star forward turned defenceman for the University of Massachusetts Amherst Minutemen, an NCAA Division I Hockey East team. Pöck was never drafted in the NHL, but signed his first pro contract upon completing his senior year on 23 March 2004 with the New York Rangers. He immediately made his NHL debut at the end of the 2003–04 season.

Pöck played eight games for the New York Rangers in the 2005–06 season, scoring two goals, getting two assists, and accumulating four penalty minutes. He spent the majority of the season however with Rangers affiliate, the Hartford Wolf Pack of the American Hockey League, accumulating an impressive 61 points in 65 games, to finish second in the league amongst defenseman and earn a selection to the AHL Second All-Star Team. During the following 2006–07 season, Pöck played in 44 games for the Rangers, scored four goals, collected four assists, and was assessed 16 penalty minutes. He also played in four first-round playoff games, amassing three assists.

After only playing in one game with the Rangers to start the 2007–08 season, Pöck was sent down passing waivers, to play with the AHL's Wolf Pack due to the Rangers having seven other healthy defencemen on the roster.

On 29 September 2008, Pöck was claimed on waivers by the Rangers' arch rivals, the New York Islanders. Pöck joined the Islanders for training camp and played a career high 59 games with the Islanders in the 2008–09 season.

On 28 May 2009, with lack of NHL interest, Pöck signed with Swiss team Rapperswil-Jona Lakers of the Swiss National League A (NLA) on a two-year contract. In his two seasons with the Lakers, despite missing the playoffs in each year, Pöck led the team amongst defenseman in points.

Upon his contract expiring with the Lakers, Pöck signed a one-year contract as a free agent, with Modo Hockey of the Swedish Elitserien on 28 April 2011. In helping Modo return to playoffs in the 2011–12 season, Pöck was the clear offensive threat among the blueline, scoring 25 points in 55 games.

With the intention of returning for another opportunity in the NHL, Pöck signed a one-year two-way contract with the Colorado Avalanche on 2 July 2012. Due to the 2012 NHL lockout and the absence of NHL training camps, Pöck was directly reassigned by the Avalanche to AHL affiliate, the Lake Erie Monsters. In adding a veteran puck-moving presence to the Monsters blueline during the 2012–13 season, Pöck led the defense with 11 goals and finished second with 33 points in 62 games.

Unable to add to his NHL experience, Pöck signed a two-year contract to return to his native Austria with original club, EC KAC, of the EBEL on 10 April 2013. After three seasons in Klagenfurt, he was not tendered a new contract. On 3 October 2016, he belatedly signed a contract with the Graz 99ers to remain in the EBEL. In the 2016–17 season, Pöck continued his scoring contributions to the blueline, in adding 6 goals and 30 points in 46 games. However, after a short playoff-run his contract with the 99ers was not renewed resulting in his release as a free agent.

Pöck retired at the end of 2017 and was named head coach of the Boston Pride in the National Women's Hockey League. He left the Pride after one season. He was later named coach for the Northern Cyclones of the USPHL Elite.

== Career statistics ==
=== Regular season and playoffs ===
			Regular season					Playoffs
Season	Team	League	GP	G	A	Pts	PIM	GP	G	A	Pts	PIM
1998–99	EC KAC	AUT	31	0	0	0	2	—	—	—	—	—
1998–99	Team Kärnten 2006	AUT–2	—	—	—	—	—	—	—	—	—	—
1999–00	EC KAC	IEHL	33	4	11	15	48	—	—	—	—	—
1999–00	EC KAC	AUT	13	1	4	5	14	—	—	—	—	—
1999–00	Team Kärnten 2006	AUT–2	2	2	4	6	8	—	—	—	—	—
2000–01	University of Massachusetts Amherst	HE	33	6	6	12	59	—	—	—	—	—
2001–02	University of Massachusetts Amherst	HE	23	5	7	12	26	—	—	—	—	—
2002–03	University of Massachusetts Amherst	HE	37	17	20	37	46	—	—	—	—	—
2003–04	University of Massachusetts Amherst	HE	37	16	25	41	48	—	—	—	—	—
2003–04	New York Rangers	NHL	6	2	2	4	0	—	—	—	—	—
2004–05	Hartford Wolf Pack	AHL	50	1	5	6	55	6	0	1	1	8
2004–05	Charlotte Checkers	ECHL	3	0	2	2	2	—	—	—	—	—
2005–06	Hartford Wolf Pack	AHL	67	15	46	61	99	6	0	3	3	15
2005–06	New York Rangers	NHL	8	1	1	2	4	—	—	—	—	—
2006–07	New York Rangers	NHL	44	4	4	8	16	4	0	3	3	4
2006–07	Hartford Wolf Pack	AHL	4	0	1	1	2	—	—	—	—	—
2007–08	New York Rangers	NHL	1	0	0	0	0	—	—	—	—	—
2007–08	Hartford Wolf Pack	AHL	74	7	37	44	63	5	0	0	0	8
2008–09	New York Islanders	NHL	59	1	2	3	35	—	—	—	—	—
2009–10	Rapperswil–Jona Lakers	NLA	49	11	22	33	58	—	—	—	—	—
2010–11	Rapperswil–Jona Lakers	NLA	47	8	17	25	40	—	—	—	—	—
2011–12	Modo Hockey	SEL	55	9	16	25	32	6	0	0	0	6
2012–13	Lake Erie Monsters	AHL	62	11	22	33	61	—	—	—	—	—
2013–14	EC KAC	EBEL	52	10	15	25	50	—	—	—	—	—
2014–15	EC KAC	EBEL	54	6	26	32	70	9	2	3	5	12
2015–16	EC KAC	EBEL	52	8	17	25	60	6	0	0	0	8
2016–17	Graz 99ers	EBEL	46	6	24	30	38	5	0	0	0	14
AUT/EBEL totals			248	31	86	117	234	20	2	3	5	34
AHL totals			257	34	111	145	280	17	0	4	4	31
NHL totals			118	8	9	17	55	4	0	3	3	4

=== International ===
Year	Team	Event	GP	G	A	Pts	PIM
1998	Austria	EJC C	4	3	4	7	6
1999	Austria	WJC C	4	0	2	2	10
1999	Austria	WJC18 B	5	6	7	13	2
2000	Austria	WJC C	4	4	7	11	2
2002	Austria	OLY	4	0	0	0	2
2002	Austria	WC	6	1	1	2	4
2003	Austria	WC	6	1	0	1	4
2004	Austria	WC	6	0	0	0	10
2005	Austria	OGQ	3	0	1	1	2
2005	Austria	WC	3	0	1	1	2
2010	Austria	WC D1	5	2	0	2	6
2013	Austria	WC	7	0	3	3	18
2014	Austria	OLY	4	0	1	1	0
Junior totals			17	13	20	33	20
Senior totals			44	4	7	11	48

== Awards and honours ==
Award	Year	Notes
College
All-Hockey East Second Team	2002–03	
Hockey East All-Tournament Team	2003, 2004	
All-Hockey East First Team	2003–04	
AHCA East First-Team All-American	2003–04	
AHL
Second All-Star Team	2006	
