= William Flynn Tournament Most Valuable Player =

Annual ice hockey award

- Sport: Ice hockey
- Awarded for: To the Most Valuable Player in the Hockey East Championship Tournament.

History
- First award: 1985
- Most recent: Max Lundgren (Merrimack)

The William Flynn Tournament Most Valuable Player is an annual award given out at the conclusion of the Hockey East tournament to the best player in the championship as voted by a panel of writers and broadcasters. The award is named in honor of former Boston College athletic director William Flynn. The Tournament MVP was first awarded in 1985 and every year thereafter.

Connor Hellebuyck and Bobby Trivigno are the only players to have won the award more than once, both doing so in consecutive years. Four recipients have received the honor while not playing for the conference champion, all of them being the runner-up goaltender. (as of 2022)

The 2020 tournament was cancelled due to the COVID-19 pandemic in the United States, as a result a Tournament MVP was not awarded that year.

== Award winners ==
Year	Winner	Position	School	Ref
1985	Chris Terreri	Goaltender	Providence	
1986	Peter Marshall	Forward	Boston University	
1987	Brian Leetch	Defenceman	Boston College	
1988	Bruce Racine	Goaltender	Northeastern	
1989	Bob Beers	Defenceman	Maine	
1990	Scott LaGrand	Goaltender	Boston College	
1991	Shawn McEachern	Left Wing	Boston University	
1992	Scott Pellerin	Left Wing	Maine	
1993	Jim Montgomery	Center	Maine	
1994	Dwayne Roloson*	Goaltender	UMass Lowell	
1995	Bob Bell*	Goaltender	Providence	
1996	Joe Hulbig	Left Wing	Providence	
1997	Michel Larocque	Goaltender	Boston University	
1998	Marty Reasoner	Center	Boston College	
1999	Blake Bellefeuille	Center	Boston College	
2000	Niko Dimitrakos	Right Wing	Maine	
2001	Chuck Kobasew	Right Wing	Boston College	
2002	Darren Haydar	Right Wing	New Hampshire	
2003	Sean Fields*	Goaltender	Boston University	
2004	Jimmy Howard	Goaltender	Maine	

Note: * recipient not on championship team

Year	Winner	Position	School	Ref
2005	Brian Boyle	Center	Boston College	
2006	David Van der Gulik	Right Wing	Boston University	
2007	Brock Bradford	Center	Boston College	
2008	Nathan Gerbe	Left Wing	Boston College	
2009	Kieran Millan	Goaltender	Boston University	
2010	Matt Lombardi	Right Wing	Boston College	
2011	Cam Atkinson	Right Wing	Boston College	
2012	Johnny Gaudreau	Left Wing	Boston College	
2013	Connor Hellebuyck	Goaltender	UMass Lowell	
2014	Connor Hellebuyck	Goaltender	UMass Lowell	
2015	Jack Eichel	Center	Boston University	
2016	Kevin Boyle*	Goaltender	UMass Lowell	
2017	C. J. Smith	Forward	UMass Lowell	
2018	Jake Oettinger	Goaltender	Boston University	
2019	Cayden Primeau	Goaltender	Northeastern	
2020	Not awarded due to the COVID-19 pandemic			
2021	Bobby Trivigno	Left Wing	Massachusetts	
2022	Bobby Trivigno	Left Wing	Massachusetts	
2023	Lane Hutson	Defenceman	Boston University	
2024	Will Smith	Center	Boston College	
2025	Albin Boija	Goaltender	Maine	
2026	Max Lundgren	Goaltender	Merrimack	

=== Winners by school ===
School	Winners
Boston College	12
Boston University	9
Maine	6
UMass Lowell	5
Providence	3
Massachusetts	2
Northeastern	2
Merrimack	1
New Hampshire	1

=== Winners by position ===
Position	Winners
Center	7
Right Wing	6
Left Wing	7
Forward	2
Defenceman	3
Goaltender	16

== See also ==
- Hockey East Awards
