= Hockey East men's ice hockey tournament =

Hockey East Men's Tournament
- College hockey conference championship
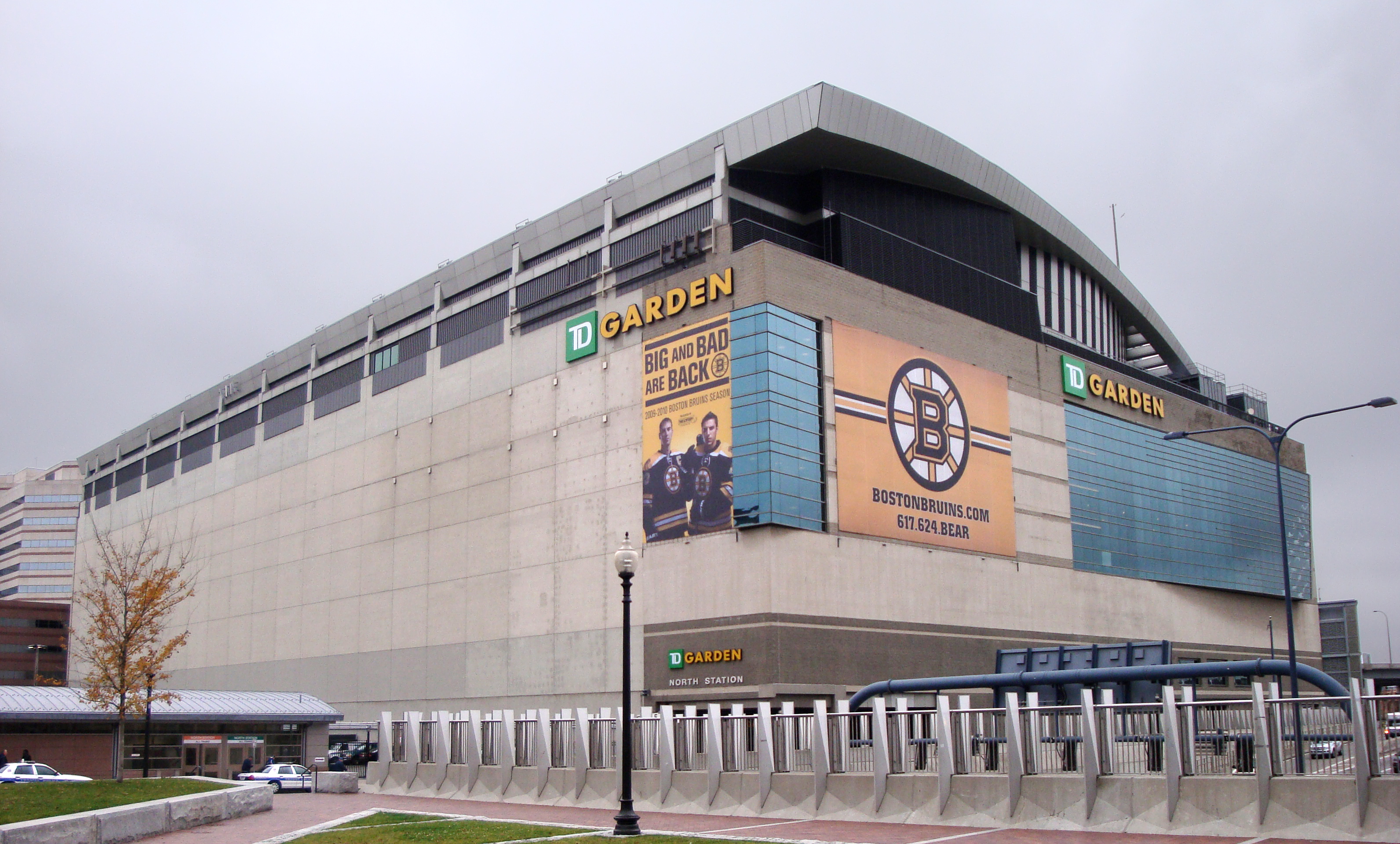
- The TD Garden in Boston has hosted the tournament's semifinal and championship games nearly every year since 1996. (Note: Due to the COVID-19 pandemic, the 2021 tournament was held exclusively at campus sites. TD Garden has hosted every other championship game since 1996.)
- Sport: College ice hockey
- Conference: Hockey East
- Number of teams: 11
- Format: Single-elimination
- Current stadium: TD Garden
- Current location: Boston, Massachusetts
- Played: 1985 – Present
- Last contest: 2026 Hockey East men's tournament
- Current champion: Merrimack (first win)
- Most championships: Boston College (twelve wins)
- Winner trophy: Lamoriello Trophy
- TV partner: ESPN+

The Hockey East Men's Tournament is the conference tournament for the men's division of the Hockey East, an NCAA Division I men's ice hockey conference that has operated since 1984. The winner of the tournament receives an automatic berth into the NCAA Tournament and the Lamoriello Trophy.

== History ==
In 1984, five ECAC Hockey teams decided to create their own conference over scheduling disputes with the Ivy League members of the ECAC. At the end of each regular season, the conference holds the Hockey East men's ice hockey tournament to determine its conference champion. The inaugural tournament was held at the Providence Civic Center, and was won by Providence by a score of 2–1 over Boston College in double overtime. In 1987, the tournament moved to the Boston Garden, and has been held in the Greater Boston area for almost every year since. In 1988, the Hockey East introduced the Lamoriello Trophy, named after the first commissioner of Hockey East, Lou Lamoriello. The trophy has been awarded to the winner of the tournament every year since 1988.

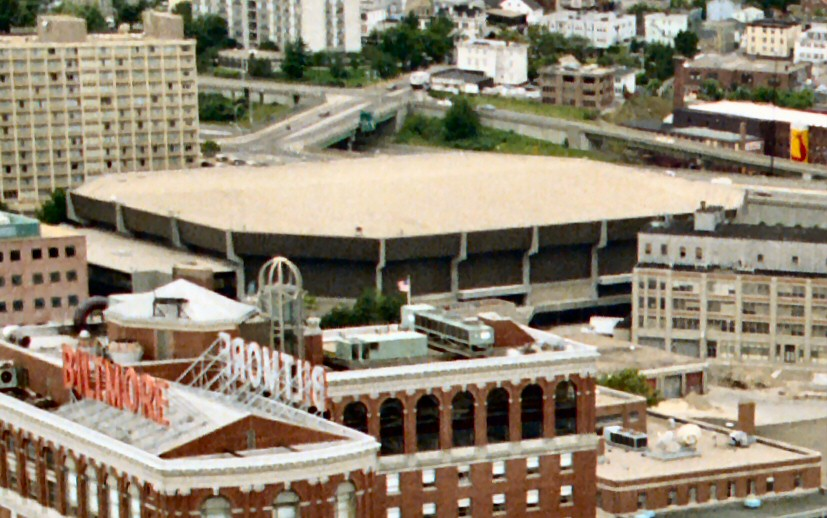
The Providence Civic Center hosted the first two Hockey East men's tournaments in 1985 and 1986.

In 1996, the tournament's semifinal and championship games moved from the Boston Garden to the TD Garden, where it has mostly remained since. In 2004, Maine bested Massachusetts by a score of 2–1 in triple overtime. This would be the longest game in Hockey East championship history and would remain Maine's last championship until they won again 21 years later in 2025. The 2016 tournament marked the first championship in which at least one of the "Big 4" schools—Boston College, Boston University, Maine and New Hampshire—did not play in the title game.

Due to the COVID-19 pandemic, the 2020 tournament was cancelled. The pandemic also necessitated all tournament games were held on campus sites in 2021, with the championship game being held at UMass's home rink, the Mullins Center. This marked the first time since the second tournament in 1986 in which the championship game was held outside the Greater Boston area. Host school UMass won over rival UMass Lowell by a score of 1–0.

The Hockey East tournament has largely been dominated by the Boston schools, with Boston College and Boston University accounting for 22 titles. As of 2025, these two schools have won over half of all Hockey East tournaments played and at least one of these two schools has appeared in 30 of the championship games. Boston College has won the most Hockey East tournaments with twelve and has the most championship game appearances with nineteen. Jerry York has coached nine championship teams and has the most championship game appearances with thirteen. Shawn Walsh has made the most consecutive championship appearances with seven (1987–1993).

== Championship Round Performance ==
| School | Championships | Appearances | Pct. |
|---|---|---|---|
| Boston College | 12 | 19 | .632 |
| Boston University | 10 | 14 | .714 |
| Maine | 6 | 15 | .400 |
| UMass Lowell | 3 | 8 | .375 |
| Northeastern | 3 | 3 | 1.000 |
| New Hampshire | 2 | 8 | .250 |
| Providence | 2 | 5 | .400 |
| Massachusetts | 2 | 3 | .667 |
| Merrimack | 1 | 3 | .250 |
| Connecticut | 0 | 3 | .000 |
| Vermont | 0 | 1 | .000 |

== Performance by team ==
The code in each cell represents the furthest the team made it in the respective tournament:

- – Team not in Hockey East
- FR Preliminary / First round (2 teams in 1995, 4 teams in 2021, 8 teams from 2015 to 2015, 6 teams in 2014, 2018 and from 2022 onward.)
- QF Quarterfinals (6 teams from 1985 to 1986, 4 teams from 1987 to 1989, 8 teams afterwards)
- SF Semifinals
- F Finals
- CH Champion

Note: the 2020 tournament was cancelled prior to the start of the quarterfinal round.
Note: Merrimack was forced to withdraw from the 2021 due to a positive COVID-19 test.

| School | # | QF | SF | F | CH | 85 | 86 | 87 | 88 | 89 | 90 | 91 | 92 | 93 | 94 | 95 | 96 | 97 | 98 | 99 | 00 | 01 | 02 | 03 | 04 | 05 | 06 | 07 | 08 | 09 | 10 | 11 | 12 | 13 | 14 | 15 | 16 | 17 | 18 | 19 | 20 | 21 | 22 | 23 | 24 | 25 | 26 |
|---|---|---|---|---|---|---|---|---|---|---|---|---|---|---|---|---|---|---|---|---|---|---|---|---|---|---|---|---|---|---|---|---|---|---|---|---|---|---|---|---|---|---|---|---|---|---|---|
| Boston College | 42 | 41 | 28 | 19 | 12 | F | F | CH | QF | F | CH | QF | SF | QF | QF | FR | QF | SF | CH | CH | F | CH | QF | SF | QF | CH | F | CH | CH | SF | CH | CH | CH | SF | QF | QF | SF | F | SF | F | QF | SF | QF | QF | CH | QF | SF |
| Boston University | 42 | 41 | 28 | 14 | 10 | SF | CH | QF | QF | QF | SF | CH | QF | F | CH | CH | SF | CH | QF | QF | SF | QF | SF | F | SF | SF | CH | SF | SF | CH | SF | QF | SF | F | FR | CH | QF | SF | CH | SF | QF | QF | QF | CH | F | SF | QF |
| Maine | 40 | 34 | 21 | 15 | 6 | QF | QF | F | F | CH | F | F | CH | CH | QF | SF | F | | F | SF | CH | SF | F | QF | CH | SF | SF | QF | | QF | F | QF | F | QF | QF | FR | FR | FR | QF | QF | QF | FR | FR | FR | SF | CH | QF |
| Massachusetts Lowell | 38 | 35 | 21 | 8 | 3 | SF | SF | SF | SF | | QF | QF | QF | SF | F | SF | SF | SF | SF | QF | | SF | SF | QF | QF | QF | QF | | QF | F | QF | | QF | CH | CH | F | F | CH | FR | QF | QF | F | SF | SF | FR | QF | FR |
| Northeastern | 35 | 34 | 12 | 3 | 3 | QF | QF | SF | CH | SF | QF | SF | QF | QF | SF | QF | QF | QF | QF | | QF | QF | QF | | | QF | | QF | QF | SF | | SF | | | QF | FR | CH | QF | SF | CH | QF | QF | SF | QF | QF | SF | QF |
| New Hampshire | 39 | 33 | 17 | 8 | 2 | QF | QF | | | QF | SF | QF | F | SF | SF | QF | QF | F | QF | F | SF | QF | CH | CH | SF | F | SF | F | SF | QF | QF | SF | QF | QF | F | SF | FR | QF | FR | QF | | QF | FR | FR | QF | FR | FR |
| Providence | 39 | 39 | 17 | 5 | 2 | CH | SF | QF | SF | SF | QF | SF | SF | QF | QF | F | CH | QF | QF | SF | QF | F | QF | QF | QF | QF | QF | QF | QF | | | | SF | SF | SF | QF | SF | QF | F | QF | QF | SF | QF | SF | QF | QF | QF |
| Massachusetts | 28 | 23 | 8 | 3 | 2 | – | – | – | – | – | – | – | – | – | – | QF | QF | QF | | QF | QF | | | SF | F | QF | QF | SF | QF | QF | QF | QF | QF | | FR | FR | FR | FR | QF | SF | QF | CH | CH | FR | SF | QF | SF |
| Merrimack | 28 | 24 | 4 | 3 | 1 | – | – | – | – | – | QF | QF | QF | QF | QF | QF | | QF | SF | QF | QF | QF | QF | QF | QF | | | | | | QF | F | QF | QF | FR | QF | QF | FR | QF | | | | QF | F | FR | FR | CH |
| Connecticut | 11 | 8 | 3 | 3 | 0 | – | – | – | – | – | – | – | – | – | – | – | – | – | – | – | – | – | – | – | – | – | – | – | – | – | – | – | – | – | – | FR | FR | FR | QF | | QF | QF | F | QF | QF | F | F |
| Vermont | 18 | 12 | 3 | 1 | 0 | – | – | – | – | – | – | – | – | – | – | – | – | – | – | – | – | – | – | – | – | – | QF | QF | F | QF | SF | QF | | QF | QF | SF | QF | QF | FR | | | FR | FR | QF | FR | FR | FR |
| Notre Dame | 4 | 4 | 2 | 0 | 0 | – | – | – | – | – | – | – | – | – | – | – | – | – | – | – | – | – | – | – | – | – | – | – | – | – | – | – | – | – | SF | QF | QF | SF | – | – | – | – | – | – | – | – | – |

== Location of Hockey East men's tournaments ==
- 1985–1986: Providence Civic Center, Providence, Rhode Island
- 1987–1988, 1991–1995: Boston Garden, Boston, Massachusetts
- 1989–1990: Kelley Rink, Chestnut Hill, Massachusetts
- 1996–2020 (Note: The 2020 tournament was planned to be held at TD Garden before being cancelled due to the COVID-19 pandemic.), 2022 – Present: TD Garden, Boston, Massachusetts
- 2021: Campus Sites (Note: The 2021 tournament was held exclusively at campus sites due to the COVID-19 pandemic.)
