= Greg Mauldin =

American ice hockey player (born 1982)

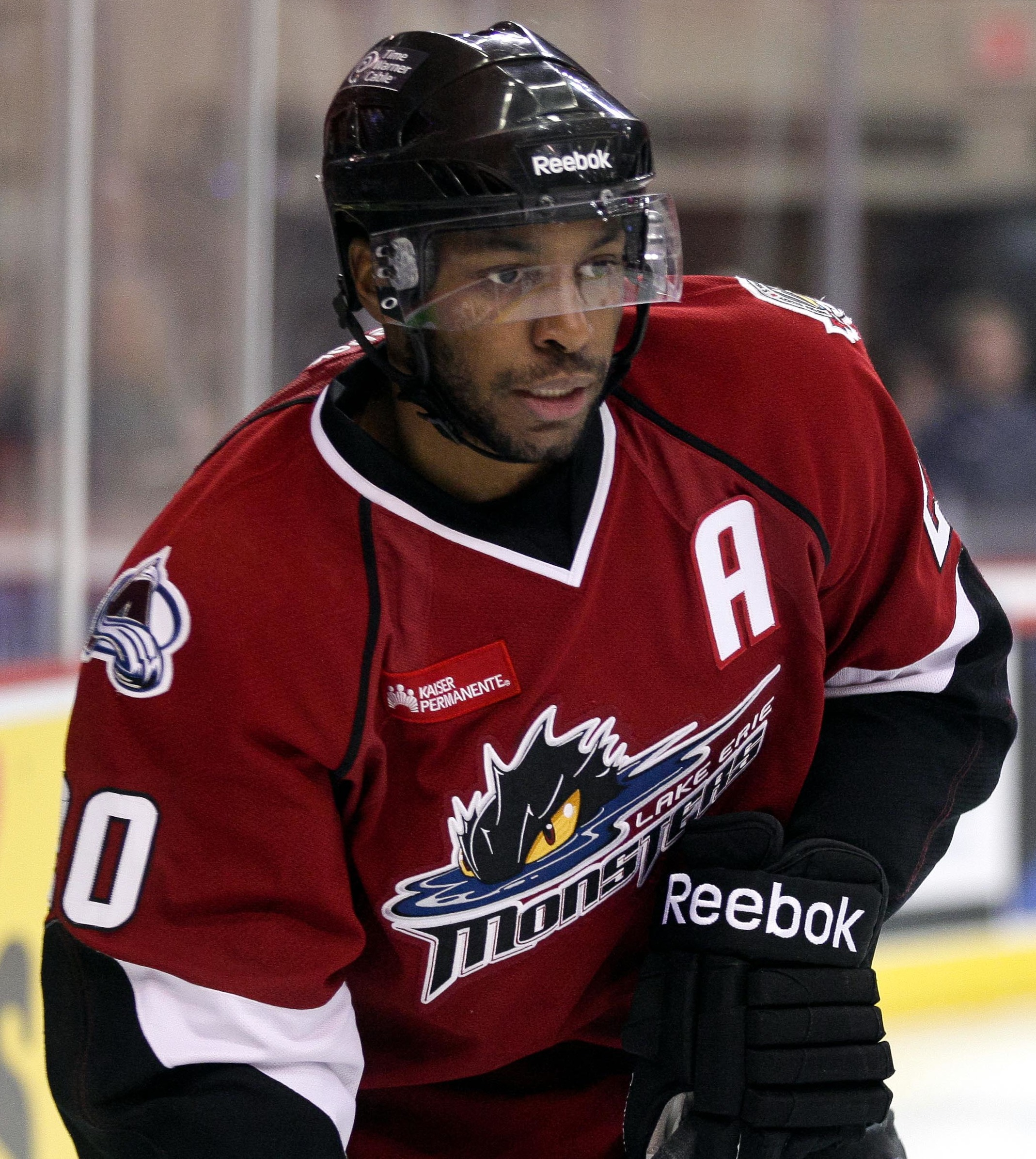
- Mauldin with the Lake Erie Monsters in 2012
- Born: June 10, 1982 (age 44) Holliston, Massachusetts, U.S.
- Height: 5 ft 11 in (180 cm)
- Weight: 195 lb (88 kg; 13 st 13 lb)
- Position: Forward
- Shoots: Right
- team Former teams: Free agent Columbus Blue Jackets; New York Islanders; Colorado Avalanche; HC Fribourg-Gottéron; ERC Ingolstadt; KHL Medveščak Zagreb; Stavanger Oilers
- NHL draft: 199th overall, 2002; Columbus Blue Jackets
- Playing career: 2004–2020, 2021–present

Gregory M. Mauldin (born June 10, 1982) is an American professional ice hockey forward who is currently an unrestricted free agent. He most recently played for the Stavanger Oilers of the Norwegian Eliteserien. He was briefly retired for the 2020–21 season and served as coach for the USA Hockey National Team Development Program.

== Playing career ==
Mauldin played with the Boston Junior Bruins of the Eastern Junior Hockey League in 1999 where he showed his talent and explosiveness on the ice while earning consecutive First All-Star Team selections and the Eastern Junior Hockey League MVP Award in 2000. In 2001, he moved on to UMass Amherst where he accumulated 94 points in 98 games and led the Minutemen to the 2003 Hockey East Championship game. After three successful seasons with UMass he joined the Columbus Blue Jackets who had selected him with the 199th overall pick in the 2002 NHL entry draft.

Mauldin made his NHL debut not long after the Ice Hockey East Championship and appeared in six games for the Blue Jackets. He played the 2004–05 season for the Syracuse Crunch, the Blue Jackets AHL affiliate, and finished 7th on the team in scoring with 27 points. During the 2005–06 season he was traded to the Minnesota Wild for defenceman Dustin Wood. He was then assigned to the Houston Aeros, the Wild's AHL affiliate.

In the 2006–07 season, Mauldin initially played with Bloomington Prairie Thunder of the UHL, before leaving to play in Sweden. Prior to the 2007–08 season, Mauldin attended the St. Louis Blues prospect development Camp. He was then signed to a free agent contract by the Binghamton Senators of the AHL. Mauldin was then signed by parent club, the Ottawa Senators to a one-year contract for the 2008–09 season but was reassigned to Binghamton for the year.

On July 3, 2009, Mauldin signed a one-year contract with the New York Islanders. In the 2009–10 season he led the Bridgeport Sound Tigers, AHL affiliate of the Islanders, in scoring with 54 points in 77 games. He made his brief Islanders debut in a 7-3 defeat to the Pittsburgh Penguins on April 8, 2010, before returning to the Sound Tigers for a quarterfinal appearance in the playoffs.

A free agent following the season, Mauldin signed a one-year contract with the Colorado Avalanche on July 2, 2010. After initially impressing at the Avalanche's training camp, Mauldin was reassigned to AHL affiliate, the Lake Erie Monsters, to start the 2010–11 season. He was later called up by the Avalanche, and in his first game on November 12, 2010, he scored his first NHL goal, which was short handed, in a 5-1 road win against Steve Mason of his former team the Columbus Blue Jackets. He was named the second star of the game. Mauldin continued to make an impact with the Avalanche from the fourth line, most notably scoring two goals and two assists in a 7-4 victory over the Minnesota Wild on November 28, 2010, to be named first star of the game. Mauldin remained with the Avalanche for a career-high 29 games and 10 points before he was later returned to help Lake Erie to their first post-season berth.

In the 2011–12 season, Mauldin failed to make the Avalanche out of training camp and was reassigned to Lake Erie. After a strong start with the Monsters, Mauldin was limited through injury before finishing with 59 games, to place third in Lake Erie scoring 34 points.

A free agent, Mauldin returned for a second stint in Europe signing a one-year contract with HC Fribourg-Gottéron of the Swiss NLA on July 23, 2012. At the beginning of the 2014 season Mauldin was named an assistant captain and on November 21, 2014 Mauldin signed a two-year extension with HC Fribourg-Gottéron.

Following his fifth season with Fribourg-Gottéron after the 2016–17 season, Mauldin left as a free agent and agreed to a one-year deal with German outfit, ERC Ingolstadt of the Deutsche Eishockey Liga (DEL), on August 15, 2017.

Mauldin continued his journeyman career, signing in the following summer to a one-year contract with Croatian club, KHL Medveščak Zagreb of the EBEL, on August 1, 2018. In the 2018–19 season, Mauldin produced 15 points in 23 appearances for Zagreb before opting to mutually conclude his contract mid-season to join Norwegian club, the Stavanger Oilers of the GET-ligaen on December 14, 2018.

== Coaching career ==
Mauldin was hired as an assistant coach for Dan Muse with the USNTDP Men's U18 team in October 2020.

== Career statistics ==
=== Regular season and playoffs ===
			Regular season					Playoffs
Season	Team	League	GP	G	A	Pts	PIM	GP	G	A	Pts	PIM
1998–99	Holliston High School	HSMA
1999–2000	Boston Junior Bruins	EJHL	59	45	42	87	14	—	—	—	—	—
2000–01	Boston Junior Bruins	EJHL	53	48	58	106	73	—	—	—	—	—
2001–02	University of Massachusetts Amherst	HE	33	12	12	24	10	—	—	—	—	—
2002–03	University of Massachusetts Amherst	HE	36	21	20	41	26	—	—	—	—	—
2003–04	University of Massachusetts Amherst	HE	29	15	14	29	15	—	—	—	—	—
2003–04	Columbus Blue Jackets	NHL	6	0	0	0	4	—	—	—	—	—
2003–04	Syracuse Crunch	AHL	2	0	0	0	0	1	0	0	0	0
2004–05	Syracuse Crunch	AHL	66	7	20	27	49	—	—	—	—	—
2005–06	Syracuse Crunch	AHL	56	12	17	29	53	—	—	—	—	—
2005–06	Houston Aeros	AHL	11	1	3	4	0	8	1	1	2	2
2006–07	Bloomington Prairie Thunder	UHL	2	0	0	0	2	—	—	—	—	—
2006–07	IK Oskarshamn	Allsv	26	5	8	13	31	—	—	—	—	—
2006–07	Huddinge IK	Allsv	6	1	2	3	0	—	—	—	—	—
2007–08	Binghamton Senators	AHL	71	15	18	33	37	—	—	—	—	—
2008–09	Binghamton Senators	AHL	80	24	27	51	41	—	—	—	—	—
2009–10	Bridgeport Sound Tigers	AHL	77	25	29	54	35	5	1	2	3	0
2009–10	New York Islanders	NHL	1	0	0	0	0	—	—	—	—	—
2010–11	Lake Erie Monsters	AHL	43	18	17	35	20	7	0	2	2	2
2010–11	Colorado Avalanche	NHL	29	5	5	10	8	—	—	—	—	—
2011–12	Lake Erie Monsters	AHL	59	16	18	34	17	—	—	—	—	—
2012–13	HC Fribourg–Gottéron	NLA	39	13	8	21	8	18	2	2	4	4
2013–14	HC Fribourg–Gottéron	NLA	43	13	15	28	18	10	5	3	8	0
2014–15	HC Fribourg–Gottéron	NLA	40	18	17	35	8	—	—	—	—	—
2015–16	HC Fribourg–Gottéron	NLA	28	11	13	24	0	5	1	2	3	2
2016–17	HC Fribourg–Gottéron	NLA	34	10	9	19	6	—	—	—	—	—
2017–18	ERC Ingolstadt	DEL	51	9	16	25	18	5	0	0	0	4
2018–19	KHL Medveščak Zagreb	AUT	23	5	10	15	6	—	—	—	—	—
2018–19	Stavanger Oilers	NOR	17	4	7	11	14	12	5	5	10	8
2019–20	Stavanger Oilers	NOR	31	15	11	26	10	—	—	—	—	—
2021–22	Kalamazoo Wings	ECHL	5	2	1	3	2	—	—	—	—	—
2021–22	Stavanger Oilers	NOR	6	0	1	1	2	15	5	5	10	0
2022–23	Stavanger Oilers	NOR	37	7	10	17	2	15	3	3	6	4
2023–24	Stavanger Oilers	NOR	43	12	8	20	33	11	1	2	3	0
NHL totals			36	5	5	10	12	—	—	—	—	—
NLA totals			184	65	62	127	40	33	8	7	15	6

== Awards and honors ==
Award	Year
College
Hockey East All-Tournament Team	2004

== See also ==
- List of black NHL players
