= 1987 Hockey East men's ice hockey tournament =

1987 Hockey East Men's ice hockey tournament
- Dates: March 10–16, 1987
- Teams: 6
- Finals site: Boston Garden; Boston, Massachusetts
- Champions: Boston College (1st title)
- Winning coach: Len Ceglarski (1st title)
- MVP: Brian Leetch (Boston College)
- Hockey East Men's Ice Hockey Tournaments

The 1987 Hockey East Men's Ice Hockey Tournament was the 3rd tournament in the history of the conference. It was played between March 10 and March 16, 1987. Quarterfinal games were played at home team campus sites, while the final four games were, for the first time, played at the Boston Garden in Boston, Massachusetts, the home venue of the NHL's Boston Bruins. By winning the tournament, Boston College received the Hockey East's automatic bid to the 1987 NCAA Division I Men's Ice Hockey Tournament.

== Format ==
The tournament featured three rounds of play with each matchup being a single-elimination game. The team that finishes in seventh place is ineligible for tournament play. In the first round, the third seed and sixth seeds, and the fourth seed and fifth seeds played with the winner advancing to the semifinals. In the semifinals, the first seed and lowest remaining quarterfinalist and second seed and highest remaining quarterfinalist each play a game with the winners advancing to the championship game. The tournament champion receives an automatic bid to the 1987 NCAA Division I Men's Ice Hockey Tournament.

== Conference standings ==
Note: GP = Games played; W = Wins; L = Losses; T = Ties; PTS = Points; GF = Goals For; GA = Goals Against

1986–87 Hockey East standings
	Conference							Overall					
	GP	W	L	T	PTS	GF	GA	GP	W	L	T	GF	GA
Boston College†*	32	26	6	0	52	203	121	39	31	8	0	233	145
Lowell	32	20	10	2	42	146	136	36	22	12	2	166	163
Maine	32	19	12	1	39	159	117	42	24	16	2	196	151
Boston University	32	15	14	3	33	134	132	37	19	15	3	158	146
Northeastern	32	11	18	3	25	110	139	37	13	21	3	126	167
Providence	32	7	22	3	17	104	156	33	7	23	3	106	161
New Hampshire	32	5	24	3	13	105	179	38	8	27	3	124	204
Championship: Boston College † indicates conference regular season champion * indicates conference tournament champion

== Bracket ==
Teams are reseeded after the quarterfinals

Quarterfinals; March 10–11
3	Maine	5
6	Providence	2
4	Boston University	2
5	Northeastern	3

Semifinals; March 15
1	Boston College	9
5	Northeastern	3
2	Lowell	4
3	Maine	5

Championship; March 16
1	Boston College	4
3	Maine	2

Note: * denotes overtime period(s)

=== Quarterfinals ===
==== (3) Maine vs. (6) Providence ====
March 11	Maine	5 – 2	Providence	Alfond Arena

==== (4) Boston University vs. (5) Northeastern ====
March 10	Boston University	2 – 3	Northeastern	Walter Brown Arena

=== Semifinals ===
==== (1) Boston College vs. (5) Northeastern ====
March 15	Boston College	9 – 3	Northeastern	Boston Garden

==== (2) Lowell vs. (3) Maine ====
March 15	Lowell	4 – 5	Maine	Boston Garden

=== Championship ===
==== (1) Boston College vs. (3) Maine ====
March 16	Boston College	4 – 2	Maine	Boston Garden

== Tournament awards ==
=== All-Tournament Team ===
- F Ken Hodge (Boston College)
- F Craig Janney (Boston College)
- F Mike McHugh (Maine)
- D Brian Leetch* (Boston College)
- D Eric Weinrich (Maine)
- G Al Loring (Maine)
- LW James W. Gonzalez (Boston College)

* Tournament MVP(s)
