= Mike Ayers (ice hockey) =

American ice hockey player (born 1980)

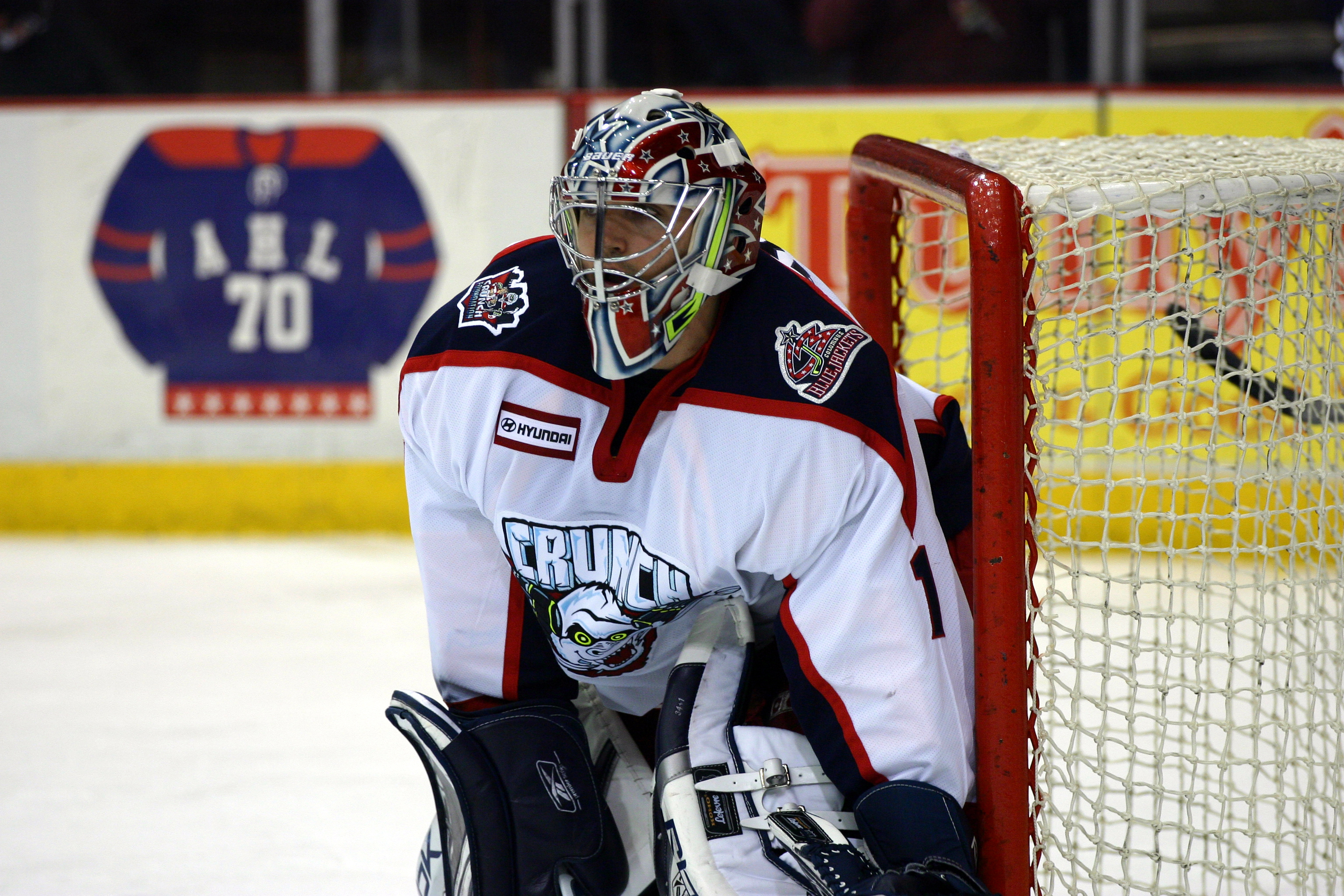
- Ayers with the Syracuse Crunch in 2005
- Born: January 16, 1980 (age 46) Hingham, Massachusetts, U.S.
- Height: 5 ft 11 in (180 cm)
- Weight: 180 lb (82 kg; 12 st 12 lb)
- Position: Goaltender
- Caught: Left
- Played for: Grand Rapids Griffins; Dayton Bombers; Cincinnati Mighty Ducks; Syracuse Crunch; Norfolk Admirals; Pensacola Ice Pilots; SønderjyskE Ishockey; Leksands IF; Charlotte Checkers
- NHL draft: 177th overall, 2000; Chicago Blackhawks
- Playing career: 2000–2008
- Coaching career

Current position
- Title: Associate head coach
- Team: Boston College
- Conference: Hockey East

Biographical details
- Education: University of New Hampshire

Coaching career (HC unless noted)
- 2008–2009: Iowa Chops (goaltending)
- 2009–2011: St. Cloud State (goaltending)
- 2011–2013: USA U-18 (goaltending)
- 2013–2020: Boston College (assistant)
- 2020–Present: Boston College (associate)

Michael Ayers (born January 16, 1980) is an American ice hockey coach and former goaltender who was an All-American for New Hampshire.

== Career ==
After graduating from Thayer Academy in 1998, Ayers spent another year playing prep school hockey before ending his junior career with the Dubuque Fighting Saints. Despite playing for the worst team in the USHL that season, Ayers was drafted by the Chicago Blackhawks after the year. That fall, he began attending the University of New Hampshire and served as the team's third goaltender as a freshman. After Ty Conklin left in 2001, Ayers split time in goal with senior Matt Carney and helped the team finish atop the Hockey East standings. The two goalies were platooned through the Hockey East Tournament with Ayers in net for the Wildcats championship game victory. UNH got the top overall seed for the NCAA Tournament and Ayers got in goal for the team's semifinal match. Unfortunately, the team was outplayed by conference rival Maine and Ayers allowed 7 goals on 40 shots.

For his junior season, Ayers took over as the primary netminder and produced his best season yet. He set program records for wins, save percentage and shutouts, leading the team to a second consecutive conference title. Ayers backstopped the Wildcats to a conference championship and the team earned the third overall seed. In his second postseason run, Ayers was a clutch player for UNH, allowing 4 goals through three games, and led the program to only its second championship game. Facing down defending champion Minnesota, Ayers turned aside 29 of 30 shots through 40 minutes and had the Wildcats tied with the Gophers. However, the wheels came off in the third. Ayers surrendered three goals in a just over five minute span and New Hampshire lost the game 1–5. Ayers did return for his senior season, but both he and the team declined. While he finished with respectable numbers, they weren't enough to get him back onto the All-American team. New Hampshire did receive a bid to the NCAA Tournament for a third consecutive season, but the team lost its opening match. While the ending was disappointing, Ayers did finish as the program's all-time wins leader (since broken).

After graduating with a degree in kinesiology, Ayers began playing professionally. He spent most of his first season in the ECHL and slowly worked his way up into the AHL. His numbers slid in his third season and he only saw limited minutes before finishing the season in Europe. He returned to the ECHL for one final season before ending his playing career in 2008.

Ayers began his second career after a short time off, becoming the goaltending coach for the Iowa Chops mid-season. He stayed with the team until the end of the year while pulling double-duty as a goaltending director for FHIT, a youth hockey organization in Minnesota. After leaving the Chops, Ayers founded his own goaltending academy, MVP Goaltending. He operated the business for just over two years. In the fall of 2009, he returned to the college ranks as an assistant for St. Cloud State. He attempted to hold three positions simultaneously, but left FHIT in November to focus on the newer positions. He remained an assistant coach and ran his goalie clinic until August 2011 when he joined USA Hockey full time as a goaltending coach. Among other duties, he served as an assistant on the US U-18 teams at the world championships in 2012 and 2013, winning a gold and silver medal respectively.

In 2013, he was lured back to college hockey, this time as an assistant for Boston College under Jerry York. Since then, he's helped develop two NHL goaltenders, Thatcher Demko and Spencer Knight. Prior to the 2020 season, Ayers was promoted to Associate Head coach, a position he continues to hold as of 2021.

== Statistics ==
=== Regular season and playoffs ===
			Regular season									Playoffs
Season	Team	League	GP	W	L	T	MIN	GA	SO	GAA	SV%	GP	W	L	MIN	GA	SO	GAA	SV%
1997–98	Thayer Academy	US-Prep	—	—	—	—	—	—	—	—	—	—	—	—	—	—	—	—	—
1998–99	Trinity-Pawling School	US-Prep	—	—	—	—	—	—	—	—	—	—	—	—	—	—	—	—	—
1999–00	Dubuque Fighting Saints	USHL	55	16	35	3	3188	196	0	3.69	.904	—	—	—	—	—	—	—	—
2000–01	New Hampshire	Hockey East	5	0	0	0	26	2	0	4.68	.875	—	—	—	—	—	—	—	—
2001–02	New Hampshire	Hockey East	20	14	3	1	1129	46	0	2.44	.915	—	—	—	—	—	—	—	—
2002–03	New Hampshire	Hockey East	41	27	8	6	2499	91	7	2.18	.926	—	—	—	—	—	—	—	—
2003–04	New Hampshire	Hockey East	36	17	14	5	2101	100	5	2.86	.899	—	—	—	—	—	—	—	—
2004–05	Dayton Bombers	ECHL	51	15	28	6	2937	142	0	2.90	.913	—	—	—	—	—	—	—	—
2004–05	Grand Rapids Griffins	AHL	1	0	0	0	19	2	0	6.02	.750	—	—	—	—	—	—	—	—
2004–05	Cincinnati Mighty Ducks	AHL	2	1	0	1	3	0	0	1.45	.952	—	—	—	—	—	—	—	—
2005–06	Dayton Bombers	ECHL	25	8	14	2	1434	82	0	3.43	.894	—	—	—	—	—	—	—	—
2005–06	Syracuse Crunch	AHL	23	12	8	1	1239	55	3	2.66	.919	—	—	—	—	—	—	—	—
2006–07	Norfolk Admirals	AHL	2	0	0	0	31	2	0	3.86	.913	—	—	—	—	—	—	—	—
2006–07	Pensacola Ice Pilots	ECHL	9	2	6	1	483	32	0	3.98	.892	—	—	—	—	—	—	—	—
2006–07	SønderjyskE Ishockey	Oddset Ligaen	14	—	—	—	—	—	—	2.98	.901	13	—	—	—	—	—	2.10	.928
2007–08	Leksands IF	Allsvenskan	13	—	—	—	—	—	—	—	—	—	—	—	—	—	—	—	—
2007–08	Charlotte Checkers	ECHL	21	10	8	1	1137	64	1	3.38	.896	—	—	—	—	—	—	—	—
NCAA totals			102	58	25	12	5,755	239	12	2.49	.914	—	—	—	—	—	—	—	—
ECHL totals			106	35	56	10	5,991	320	1	3.20	.903	—	—	—	—	—	—	—	—
AHL totals			28	13	8	2	1,413	62	3	2.63	.919	—	—	—	—	—	—	—	—

== Awards and honors ==
Award	Year
All-Hockey East Second Team	2001–02
All-Hockey East First Team	2002–03
AHCA East Second-Team All-American	2002–03

Awards and achievements
Preceded by Ty Conklin	Hockey East Goaltending Champion; 2001–02	Succeeded by Matti Kaltainen
Preceded by Darren Haydar	Hockey East Player of the Year; 2002–03; With: Ben Eaves	Succeeded by Steve Saviano
