= Stephen Werner =

American ice hockey player (born 1984)

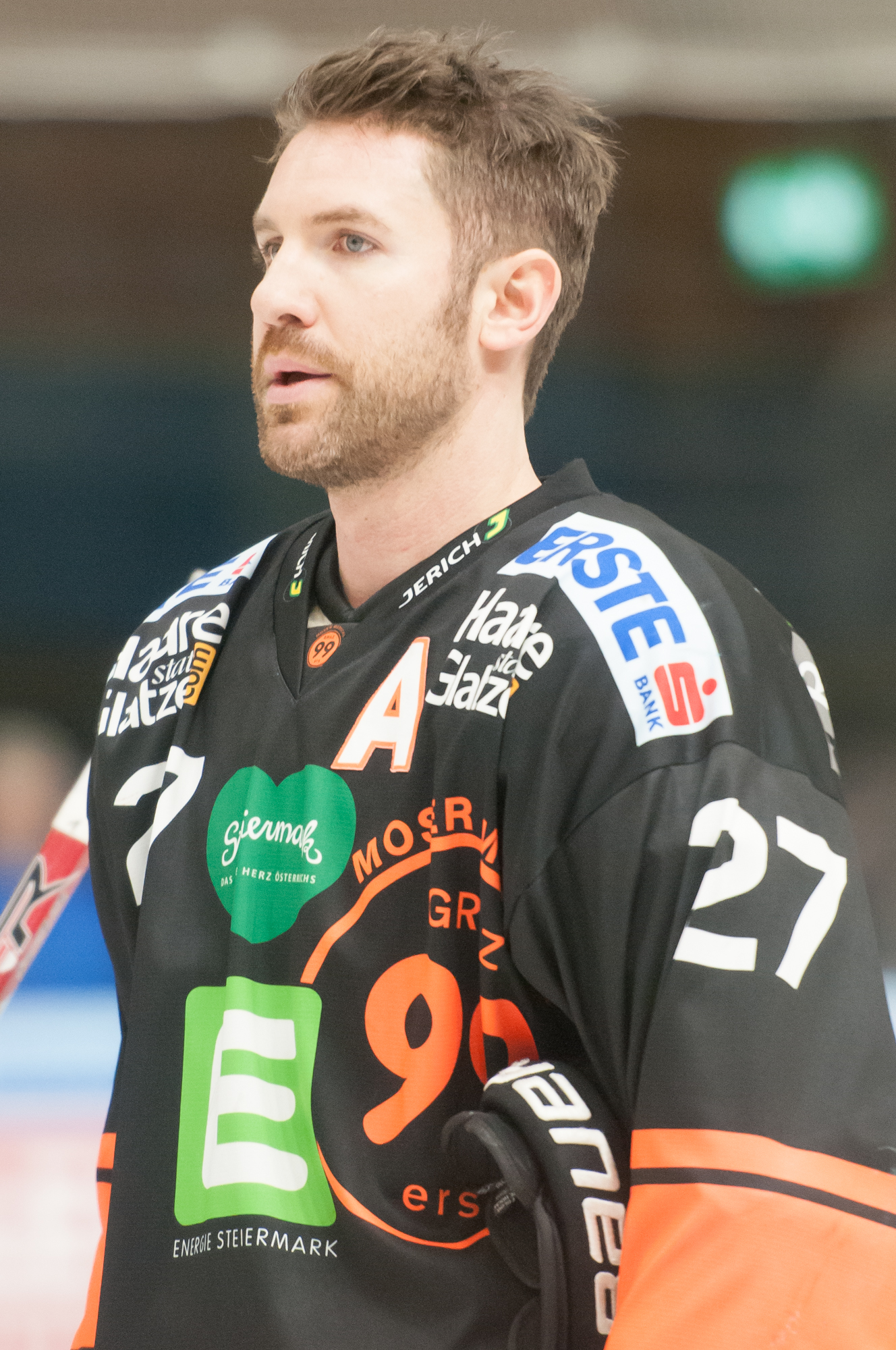
- Born: August 8, 1984 (age 41) Washington, D.C., U.S.
- Height: 6 ft 1 in (185 cm)
- Weight: 203 lb (92 kg; 14 st 7 lb)
- Position: Center
- Shot: Right
- Played for: Hershey Bears; Springfield Falcons; Milwaukee Admirals; EHC Wolfsburg; Augsburger Panther; Graz 99ers
- NHL draft: 83rd overall, 2003; Washington Capitals
- Playing career: 2006–2017

Stephen Werner (born August 8, 1984) is an American former professional ice hockey player who last played for the Graz 99ers in the Austrian Hockey League (EBEL). He was selected by the Washington Capitals in the 3rd round (83rd overall) of the 2003 NHL entry draft.

He previously played for Augsburger Panther in the Deutsche Eishockey Liga (DEL). In the midst of the 2016–17 season, his third year with the Graz 99ers, Werner had featured in just 8 games up to the mid-point of the campaign. Limited by an ongoing concussion injury, Werner opted to announce his retirement on January 9, 2017, after 10 professional seasons.

== Awards and honors ==
Award	Year
All-Hockey East Rookie Team	2002–03
Hockey East All-Tournament Team	2003

== Career statistics ==
=== Regular season and playoffs ===
			Regular season					Playoffs
Season	Team	League	GP	G	A	Pts	PIM	GP	G	A	Pts	PIM
2000–01	US NTDP U18	NAHL	56	7	21	28	24	—	—	—	—	—
2001–02	US NTDP Juniors	USHL	10	2	3	5	9	—	—	—	—	—
2001–02	US NTDP U18	NAHL	10	4	1	5	23	—	—	—	—	—
2002–03	University of Massachusetts Amherst	HE	37	16	22	38	4	—	—	—	—	—
2003–04	University of Massachusetts Amherst	HE	33	7	17	24	18	—	—	—	—	—
2004–05	University of Massachusetts Amherst	HE	38	14	13	27	12	—	—	—	—	—
2005–06	University of Massachusetts Amherst	HE	33	13	14	27	26	—	—	—	—	—
2005–06	Hershey Bears	AHL	4	0	3	3	2	—	—	—	—	—
2006–07	Hershey Bears	AHL	26	3	3	6	26	—	—	—	—	—
2006–07	South Carolina Stingrays	ECHL	26	10	7	17	14	—	—	—	—	—
2007–08	Hershey Bears	AHL	8	1	4	5	2	—	—	—	—	—
2007–08	South Carolina Stingrays	ECHL	25	6	15	21	24	19	6	9	15	8
2007–08	Springfield Falcons	AHL	30	9	4	13	23	—	—	—	—	—
2008–09	Milwaukee Admirals	AHL	37	7	8	15	18	—	—	—	—	—
2008–09	Cincinnati Cyclones	ECHL	2	1	3	4	0	—	—	—	—	—
2010–11	Starbulls Rosenheim	GER.2	48	19	39	58	26	11	5	17	22	4
2011–12	Grizzly Adams Wolfsburg	DEL	22	3	3	6	2	4	0	0	0	2
2012–13	Augsburger Panther	DEL	48	13	22	35	22	2	0	0	0	0
2013–14	Augsburger Panther	DEL	46	8	26	34	18	—	—	—	—	—
2014–15	Graz 99ers	AUT	40	9	21	30	14	—	—	—	—	—
2015–16	Graz 99ers	AUT	48	15	14	29	24	—	—	—	—	—
2016–17	Graz 99ers	AUT	8	1	1	2	6	—	—	—	—	—
AHL totals			105	20	22	42	71	—	—	—	—	—
DEL totals			116	24	51	75	42	6	0	0	0	2
AUT totals			96	25	36	61	44	—	—	—	—	—

=== International ===
Year	Team	Event	GP	G	A	Pts	PIM
2001	United States	U17	6	2	2	4	0
2002	United States	WJC18	8	3	4	7	2
2004	United States	WJC	6	5	0	5	2
Junior totals			20	10	6	16	4
