= Frank Doyle (ice hockey) =

Canadian ice hockey player

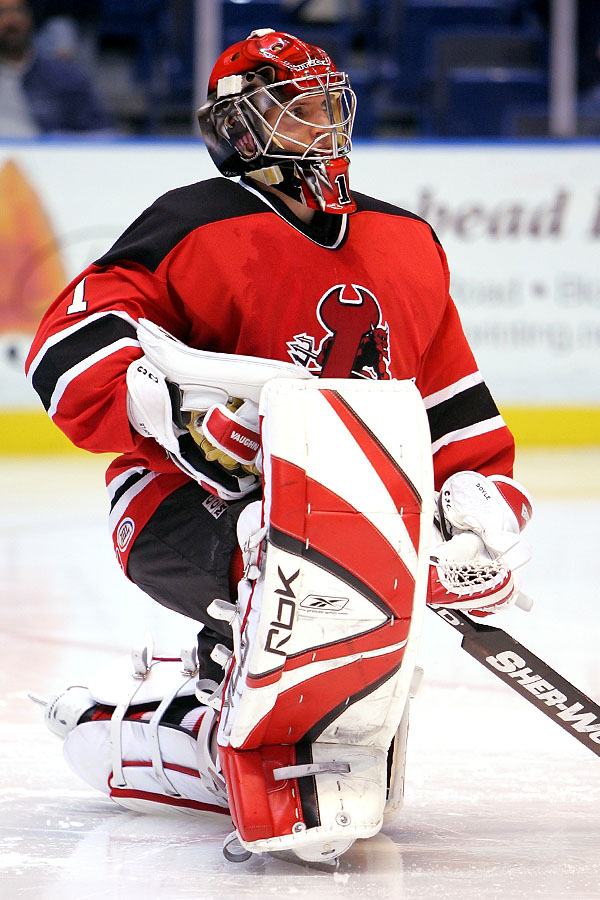
- Doyle with the Lowell Devils in 2006
- Born: September 8, 1980 (age 46) Guelph, Ontario, Canada
- Height: 6 ft 1 in (185 cm)
- Weight: 175 lb (79 kg; 12 st 7 lb)
- Position: Goaltender
- Caught: Left
- Played for: Utah Grizzlies; Albany River Rats; Lowell Devils; Kölner Haie; Worcester Sharks; HC Fassa; Sheffield Steelers
- NHL draft: Undrafted
- Playing career: 2004–2015

Frank Doyle (born September 8, 1980) is a Canadian former professional ice hockey goaltender. Doyle spent his career in the North American leagues before moving to Europe to play. He last played with the Sheffield Steelers in 2015.

== Playing career ==
Born in Guelph, Ontario, Canada, Doyle played two seasons with the University of Maine before turning professional in 2004–05 with the Idaho Steelheads of the ECHL. He played in the ECHL All-Star Game that season, and was named Most Valuable Player of the game. He also played in one game with the Utah Grizzlies of the AHL in 2004–05. He was signed as a free agent by New Jersey on August 15, 2005, and joined their former AHL affiliate, the Albany River Rats, in 2005–06. On September 1, 2008, he signed with Kölner Haie.
