= Ken Magowan =

Canadian ice hockey player

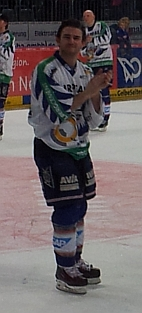
- Ken Magowan, 2012
- Born: July 22, 1981 (age 44) Kelowna, British Columbia, Canada
- Height: 6 ft 1 in (185 cm)
- Weight: 201 lb (91 kg; 14 st 5 lb)
- Position: Left wing
- Shot: Left
- Played for: Vienna Capitals; Adler Mannheim; Grizzlys Wolfsburg
- NHL draft: 198th overall, 2000; New Jersey Devils
- Playing career: 2004–2016

Ken Magowan (born July 22, 1981) is a Canadian former professional ice hockey player, who was active in Germany's highest level hockey league, the DEL, for six years. He was selected by the New Jersey Devils in the seventh round (198th overall) of the 2000 NHL entry draft.

== Playing career ==
From 1998-2000 he played as a junior with Vernon Vipers in the British Columbia Hockey League. He scored 46 goals and 62 assists in 118 games and won the 1999 Royal Bank Cup with his team. From 2000 he appeared in four seasons with Boston University Terriers and scored in 118 games 31 goals and 35 assists for the US-College team.

In 2004, he played his first professional season, but there was not much opportunities for him with the Devil's AHL affiliation Albany River Rats. So he spent the next three seasons mostly in the ECHL with Augusta Lynx and Toledo Storm. In this time he represented his teams two times (2005, 2007) in the ECHL All-Star Game. and got AHL try outs with Philadelphia Phantoms, Rochester Americans and Bridgeport Sound Tigers.

For season 2007-08 he changed to Europe and played for SC Riessersee in Germans second level hockey league. In 50 games he scored 26 goals and 24 assists and so he could find a team in Germans highest level hockey league DEL for the next season. In the next 6 years Magowan played in the DEL for Grizzlys Wolfsburg and Adler Mannheim. In his first DEL-season he was best goal scorer of the league (29 goals) and the following three seasons always one of the best goal scorer from his team. In his last two DEL years he was often injured.

In season 2014-15 he started with Löwen Frankfurt in Germans second-level hockey league DEL2 and finished the season with Vienna Capitals in Austrias highest level hockey league. In season 2015-16 he played with Lausitzer Füchse in DEL2 again. For this Saxony team he scored 10 goals and 9 assists in 28 games.

== Career statistics ==
			Regular season					Playoffs
Season	Team	League	GP	G	A	Pts	PIM	GP	G	A	Pts	PIM
1997–98	Kelowna Blazers A1	BC U18	47	45	45	90	80	—	—	—	—	—
1998–99	Vernon Vipers	BCHL	60	15	25	40	43	14	5	7	12	23
1999–2000	Vernon Vipers	BCHL	58	31	37	68	88	18	4	16	20	24
2000–01	Boston University	HE	34	5	1	6	22	—	—	—	—	—
2001–02	Boston University	HE	37	6	15	21	28	—	—	—	—	—
2002–03	Boston University	HE	38	11	13	24	20	—	—	—	—	—
2003–04	Boston University	HE	26	6	9	15	22	—	—	—	—	—
2003–04	Albany River Rats	AHL	5	0	0	0	2	—	—	—	—	—
2004–05	Augusta Lynx	ECHL	69	21	28	49	107	—	—	—	—	—
2004–05	Albany River Rats	AHL	4	2	2	4	0	—	—	—	—	—
2005–06	Toledo Storm	ECHL	68	27	30	57	133	12	2	2	4	24
2005–06	Philadelphia Phantoms	AHL	4	0	0	0	0	—	—	—	—	—
2005–06	Rochester Americans	AHL	2	0	1	1	0	—	—	—	—	—
2006–07	Bridgeport Sound Tigers	AHL	29	2	3	5	22	—	—	—	—	—
2006–07	Toledo Storm	ECHL	44	14	14	28	64	1	0	0	0	0
2007–08	SC Riessersee	GER.2	50	26	24	50	135	7	1	2	3	31
2008–09	Grizzly Adams Wolfsburg	DEL	52	29	28	57	64	9	3	1	4	33
2009–10	Grizzly Adams Wolfsburg	DEL	55	28	13	41	76	7	3	3	6	4
2010–11	Grizzly Adams Wolfsburg	DEL	41	21	15	36	64	9	10	2	12	26
2011–12	Adler Mannheim	DEL	50	19	21	40	75	14	8	9	17	8
2012–13	Adler Mannheim	DEL	26	11	4	15	24	6	1	0	1	2
2013–14	Adler Mannheim	DEL	25	2	7	9	26	5	0	1	1	0
2014–15	Löwen Frankfurt	DEL2	17	9	8	17	14	—	—	—	—	—
2014–15	Vienna Capitals	AUT	10	2	2	4	4	15	3	5	8	11
2015–16	Lausitzer Füchse	DEL2	23	10	8	18	34	—	—	—	—	—
ECHL totals			181	62	72	134	304	13	2	2	4	24
DEL totals			249	110	88	198	329	50	25	16	41	73
