= Bryan Miller (ice hockey) =

American ice hockey player

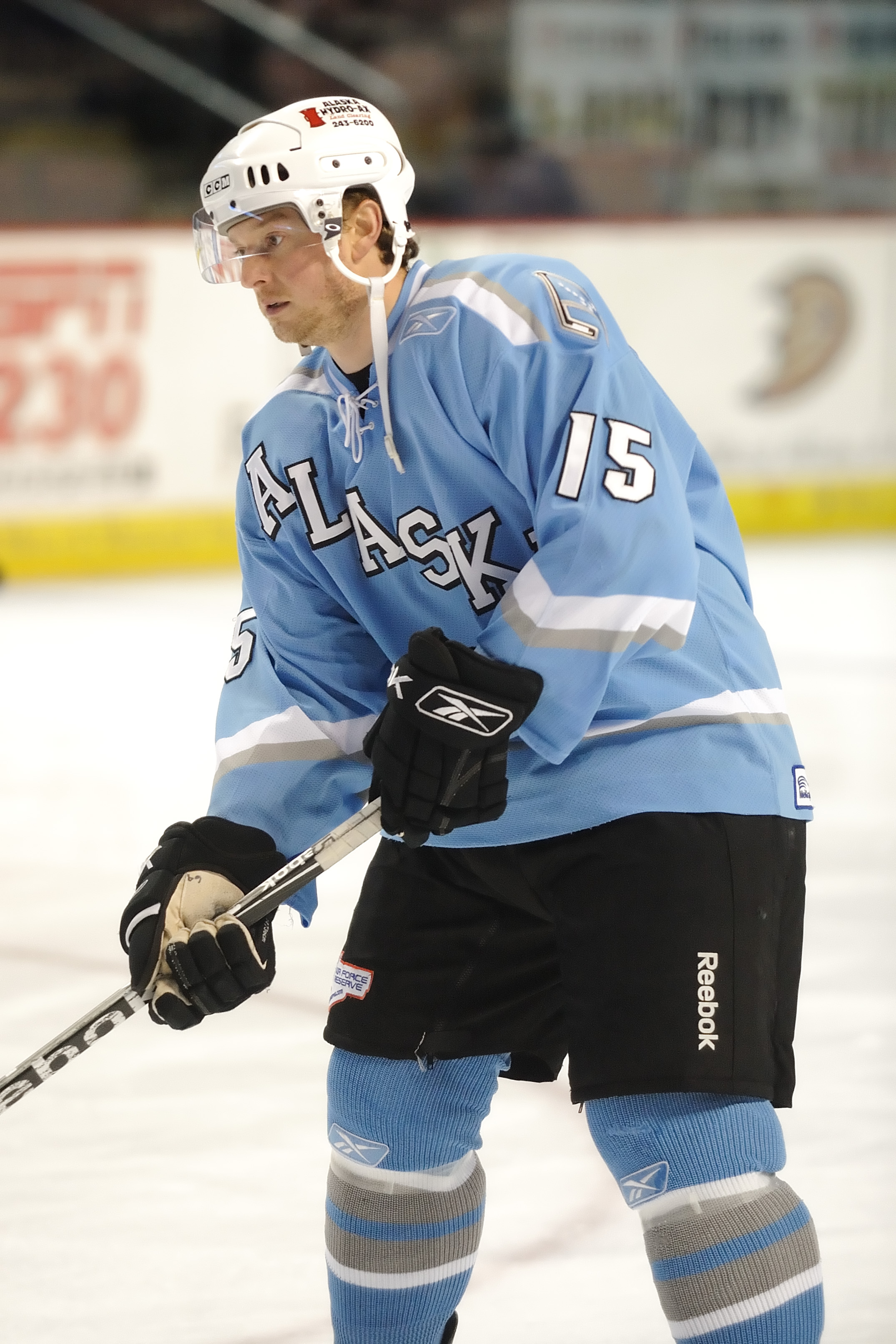
- Miller in 2009 with the Alaska Aces
- Born: February 17, 1983 (age 43) Wayne, New Jersey, U.S.
- Height: 5 ft 10 in (178 cm)
- Weight: 190 lb (86 kg; 13 st 8 lb)
- Position: Defense
- Shot: Right
- Played for: AHL; Albany River Rats; Lowell Devils; Peoria Rivermen; Providence Bruins; ECHL; Trenton Titans; Alaska Aces
- NHL draft: Undrafted
- Playing career: 2005–2012

Bryan Miller (born February 17, 1983) is an American retired professional ice hockey defenseman.

== Career ==
Miller retired following the 2011–12 ECHL season in which he had been named to the All-ECHL First Team. He played eight seasons of professional hockey, serving his final five seasons with the Alaska Aces, including with the 2011 Kelly Cup winning team.

== Awards and honors ==
Award	Year
All-Hockey East First Team	2004–05
All-ECHL First Team	2011–12
