= Sean Fields =

Canadian ice hockey player

- Born: March 6, 1981 (age 44) Edmonton, Alberta, Canada
- Height: 6 ft 0 in (183 cm)
- Weight: 203 lb (92 kg; 14 st 7 lb)
- Position: Goaltender
- Caught: Left
- Played for: AHL; Providence Bruins; ECHL; Gwinnett Gladiators; Utah Grizzlies; CHL; Tulsa Oilers; Slovenia; HDD Olimpija Ljubljana
- NHL draft: Undrafted
- Playing career: 2004–2009

Sean Fields (born March 6, 1981) is a Canadian former professional ice hockey goaltender.

Prior to turning professional, Fields attended Boston University. Playing four seasons with the Boston University Terriers men's ice hockey team (2000–04), Fields set, and still holds, the Hockey East record as the goaltender with the best career save percentage of 90.5%. Fields also holds the Boston Terriers record for most career wins with 62.

== Awards and honors ==
| Award | Year |
|---|---|
| Hockey East All-Tournament Team | 2003 |

Awards and achievements
| Preceded by Darren Haydar | William Flynn Tournament Most Valuable Player; 2003 | Succeeded by Jimmy Howard |
