= Steve Saviano =

American ice hockey player

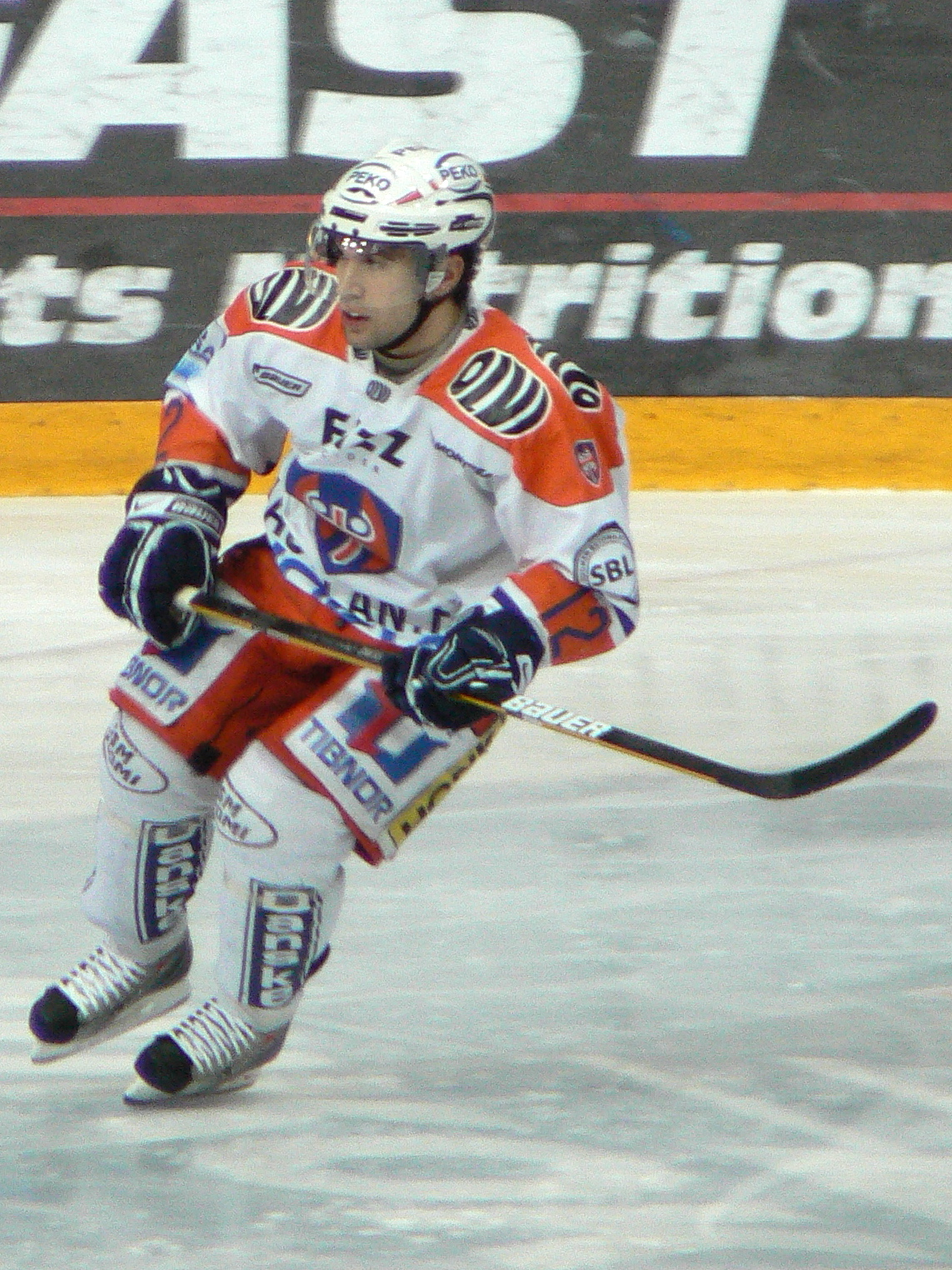
- Saviano with Tappara in 2009
- Born: August 31, 1981 (age 44) Reading, Massachusetts, USA
- Height: 5 ft 7 in (170 cm)
- Weight: 181 lb (82 kg; 12 st 13 lb)
- Position: Left wing
- Shot: Left
- DEL2 team Former teams: Lausitzer Füchse; Lowell Lock Monsters; Tappara; Växjö Lakers; Djurgårdens IF; HC Bolzano; Belfast Giants
- NHL draft: Undrafted
- Playing career: 2005–2019

Stephen Saviano (born August 31, 1981) is a former American professional ice hockey left winger. He last played for the Lausitzer Füchse in DEL2.

== Career ==
Saviano spent four seasons with the University of New Hampshire and turned pro in 2004. He had spells in the American Hockey League with the Lowell Lock Monsters and the ECHL with the Florida Everblades. In 2006 he moved to Sweden to play in HockeyAllsvenskan the country's second tier, playing for the Växjö Lakers. In 2007, he signed with Finnish SM-liiga side Tappara, but after two seasons in the Finnish SM-liiga, he returned to Växjö Lakers.

After six seasons in Sweden between the Lakers and Djurgårdens IF in the Swedish Hockey League, Saviano left as a free agent and signed a one-year contract with Italian participants of the Austrian EBEL, HCB South Tyrol on August 25, 2015. In his only season with Bolzano in the 2015–16 campaign, Saviano contributed with 11 goals and 30 points in 54 games.

As a free agent, Saviano opted to leave Italy to sign with Northern Irish EIHL participants, the Belfast Giants, on a one-year contract on June 7, 2016. He stayed for two seasons and was an assistant captain with the team during the 2017–18 season. On August 20, 2018, Saviano signed with the Lausitzer Füchse in DEL2, playing one season there before retiring in 2019.

== Awards and honors ==
Award	Year
Hockey East All-Tournament Team	2003
All-NCAA All-Tournament Team	2003
All-Hockey East First Team	2003–04
AHCA East First-Team All-American	2003–04

== Career statistics ==
			Regular season					Playoffs
Season	Team	League	GP	G	A	Pts	PIM	GP	G	A	Pts	PIM
1998–99	Reading Memorial High School	HSMA
1999–2000	Reading Memorial High School	HSMA
2000–01	University of New Hampshire	HE	16	1	1	2	2	—	—	—	—	—
2001–02	University of New Hampshire	HE	40	13	14	27	6	—	—	—	—	—
2002–03	University of New Hampshire	HE	42	9	30	39	18	—	—	—	—	—
2003–04	University of New Hampshire	HE	41	27	22	49	2	—	—	—	—	—
2004–05	Lowell Lock Monsters	AHL	6	0	1	1	0	—	—	—	—	—
2004–05	Florida Everblades	ECHL	58	14	38	52	4	17	4	14	18	2
2005–06	Lowell Lock Monsters	AHL	25	6	3	9	14	—	—	—	—	—
2005–06	Florida Everblades	ECHL	42	25	45	70	4	5	2	8	10	0
2006–07	Växjö Lakers	Allsv	24	6	15	21	2	3	0	1	1	2
2007–08	Tappara	SM-l	56	7	16	23	10	11	5	4	9	4
2008–09	Tappara	SM-l	57	6	15	21	14	—	—	—	—	—
2009–10	Växjö Lakers	Allsv	52	19	16	35	14	9	2	4	6	4
2010–11	Växjö Lakers	Allsv	52	19	29	48	8	9	4	3	7	2
2011–12	Växjö Lakers	SEL	54	9	12	21	2	—	—	—	—	—
2012–13	Växjö Lakers	SEL	55	6	3	9	4	—	—	—	—	—
2013–14	Djurgårdens IF	Allsv	52	11	17	28	8	10	0	3	3	2
2014–15	Djurgårdens IF	SHL	53	7	7	14	6	2	0	0	0	0
2015–16	HC Bolzano	AUT	54	11	19	30	4	6	1	0	1	2
2016–17	Belfast Giants	GBR	52	17	28	45	2	3	1	0	1	0
2017–18	Belfast Giants	GBR	54	20	28	48	14	2	0	0	0	0
2018–19	Lausitzer Füchse	GER.2	50	23	25	48	12	7	2	3	5	0
ECHL totals			100	39	83	122	8	22	6	22	28	2
Allsv totals			180	55	77	132	32	31	6	11	17	10
SEL/SHL totals			162	22	22	44	12	2	0	0	0	0

Awards and achievements
Preceded by Mike Ayers / Ben Eaves	Hockey East Player of the Year; 2003–04	Succeeded by Patrick Eaves
Preceded by Martin Kariya	Len Ceglarski Sportsmanship Award; 2003–04	Succeeded by Jason Guerriero
