= 2024–25 Maine Black Bears men's ice hockey season =

Hockey East Tournament, Champion NCAA Tournament, Regional Semifinal
- Conference: 2nd Hockey East
- Home ice: Alfond Arena

Rankings
- USCHO: #8
- USA Hockey: #7

Record
- Overall: 24–8–6
- Conference: 13–5–6
- Home: 15–2–3
- Road: 7–4–3
- Neutral: 0–2–0

Coaches and captains
- Head coach: Ben Barr
- Assistant coaches: Alfie Michaud; Jason Fortier; Eric Soltys
- Captain(s): David Breazeale; Lynden Breen
- Alternate captain(s): Thomas Freel; Nolan Renwick; Harrison Scott

The 2024–25 Maine Black Bears Men's ice hockey season was the 50th season of play for the program, the 48th season competing at the Division I level, and the 41st in Hockey East. The Black Bears represented the University of Maine, played their home games at the Alfond Arena and were coached by Ben Barr in his 4th season.

== Season ==
After posting their first 20-win season in more than a decade, Maine came into this season with high expectations. While the Black bears had lost their leading scorer from the year before Bradly Nadeau, they retained the services of Albin Boija, who had taken over as the team's starting goaltender in the second half. Boija's outstanding play was evident from the very start of the season as he posted back-to-back shutouts in the first week. Maine could continue to benefit from his performance throughout the entire season as he put up some of the best numbers in the country and went on to be named as a second team All-American.

With a solid foundation in goal, Maine was also able to bring a good offensive effort to bear and lost just 2 games in the first half of the season (both to Boston College). The team received a huge boost from the addition of several transfer players but none were more surprising than Taylor Makar. The Calgary Flames draft pick had a largely unremarkable career to that point with just 22 points during his three seasons at Massachusetts. Once he donned the Bears' sweater, however, he was able to find a fit for his game and posted a career year. Not only did he shatter his previous career highs but he more than doubled his totals in both goals and points in his senior season. With other new players Frank Djurasevic, Charlie Russell and Owen Fowler also featuring prominently in Maine's offensive attack, the team was able to take advantage of the few number of goals they allowed.

The extended winning streaks the Black Bears were able to put together had them consistently ranked in the top 10 of the national polls. By the time Christmas rolled around, Maine was up to No. 3 in the PairWise rankings and was well on its way to earning a tournament bid. However, upon the team's return from the winter break, the Bears suffered a stunning loss when the team was felled by Bentley. The loss was made all the more surprising by Maine completely outplaying their opposition on the ice but failing to convert on five of their six power plays, which included a major penalty. After splitting with defending champions Denver the following week, Maine was soon able to recover its early-season momentum and only lost two games over the next eight weeks.

As the team battled through a tenacious bunch of Hockey East opponents, the offense declined from the lofty totals it had produced in the first half of the year, however, the team was still able to fire at a consistent clip. When the dust settled on the regular season, Maine had finished second in the standings. While that was impressive in its own right, it was made more so by the fact that Hockey East was highest-ranked league in all of college hockey that season. The Black Bears had passed through the gauntlet with flying colors and were guaranteed a spot in the national tournament regardless of their performance in the conference playoffs.

=== Postseason ===
Even with that in mind, the Black Bears were not content to rest on their laurels and kicked off their postseason run with a dominating performance over a collapsing Massachusetts Lowell team. The relatively easy win sent them to semifinal round where they took on a surging Northeastern. Maine got off to a good start and was able to build a 2-goal lead early in the second period. The Huskies countered and evened the score before the start of the third, then took the lead themselves less than five minutes into the final frame. Maine kicked its offense into high gear and began firing the puck on goal. With about 7 minutes to play, Luke Antonacci managed to break through and tie the match with just his second goal of the campaign. Maine continued to demonstrate a superior ability to control the puck for the rest of the game but the Huskies' netminder was putting up a tremendous show keeping his team in the match. However, Maine's constant attack eventually wore down Northeaster's defense and Nolan Renwick scored the winning goal after the Huskies fell asleep and allowed him to set up shot along the side of the net.

The championship game pitted Maine against Connecticut, who had given the Bears fits during the season. Wanting to avenge their earlier losses, Maine played a very conscientious game and didn't take a single penalty in the match. UConn took only one themselves but the Black Bears were still able to convert on the advantage and used that to help build an early lead. The defense stayed strong and limited the scoring chances for the Huskies, while Boija turned aside everything through the first two periods. With UConn down by 3 goals entering the final period, they opened up the offense and started capitalizing on their chances. However, they had to sacrifice their defense in order to try and get back into the game and Maker made them pay by answering both of the Connecticut goals in the third. Maine's championship was the first for the program in over 20 years, which not only gave them the conference's automatic bid but allowed Maine to receive a #1 seed.

Their position as the third overall seed should have given Maine an advantageous position for tournament selection, however, circumstances conspired against the Black Bears. Despite winning their conference title, Maine still found itself rated below Boston College, thanks in no small part to losing their early season matches. This meant that BC received priority seeding and were awarded the Manchester Regional while the Bears had to settle for Allentown. While travelling slightly further was only a chose for the fans, it was the matchup that turned out to be the real problem for Maine. Ordinarily, Maine would have been set to face the #14 overall seed, Minnesota State, however, because the #13 seed Penn State, was the host for the Allentown Regional, they were slotted as Maine's opponent instead.

At the time, Penn State was one of the hottest teams in the country, having gone 12–3–1 despite facing down some of the toughest coemption in the country. As the game played out, the Nittany Lions proved to be a terrible match for Maine in the first round of the tournament. Maine was able to get on the board first with a lucky bounce just past the 4-minute mark. Unfortunately, that was a good as the game got for the Bears. Soon after, Maine took their first penalty of the game and it took less than 10 seconds for Penn State to even the score. The Lions completely took over the remainder of the period, scoring twice more, which included another power play marker, and ended the first periods in total control of the match. Maine came out flying in the second period but was unable to chip away at the Penn State lead. Instead, a bad turnover behind their own net resulted in another goal from the Nittany Lions. That marker allowed Penn State to play a mostly defensive game for the remainder of the match and Maine was unable to break through. Boije was pulled with several minutes left in the third period but an empty-net goal with three and half minutes to play effectively ended the game.

== Departures ==
Player	Position	Nationality	Cause
Connor Androlewicz	Goaltender	United States	Graduate transfer to Stonehill
Cole Hanson	Forward	United States	Graduation (retired)
Ryan Hopkins	Defenseman	Canada	Returned to juniors (Fredericton Red Wings)
Donavan Houle	Forward	Canada	Graduation (signed with San Jose Barracuda)
Parker Lindauer	Forward	United States	Transferred to Union
Bradly Nadeau	Forward	Canada	Signed professional contract (Carolina Hurricanes)
Victor Östman	Goaltender	Sweden	Graduation (signed with Seattle Kraken)
Reid Pabich	Forward	United States	Transferred to Sacred Heart
Ben Poisson	Forward	Canada	Graduation (signed with Greenville Swamp Rabbits)
Félix Trudeau	Forward	Canada	Transferred to Sacred Heart

== Recruiting ==
Player	Position	Nationality	Age	Notes
Patriks Bērziņš	Goaltender	Latvia	21	Talsi, LAT
Frank Djurasevic	Defenseman	United States	22	New Rochelle, NY; transfer from Merrimack
Owen Fowler	Forward	United States	22	Tewksbury, MA; transfer from Massachusetts Lowell
Oskar Komarov	Forward	Finland	20	Uusikaarlepyy, FIN
Taylor Makar	Forward	Canada	23	Calgary, AB; transfer from Massachusetts; selected 220th overall in 2021
Ross Mitton	Forward	United States	24	Manhasset, NY; graduate transfer from Colgate
Brian Morse	Defenseman	United States	21	Fresno, CA
Thomas Pichette	Forward	Canada	21	Maskinongé, QC
Charlie Russell	Forward	United States	21	Houghton, MI; transfer from Clarkson
Gage Stewart	Goaltender	Canada	21	Marathon, ON

== Roster ==
As of August 15, 2024.

No.	Nat.	Player	Class	Pos	Height	Weight	DoB	Hometown	Previous team	NHL rights
2	(United States)	Jack Dalton	Sophomore	D	6' 0" (1.83 m)	174 lb (79 kg)	2003-07-22	River Forest, Illinois	New Mexico Ice Wolves (NAHL)	—
3	(United States)	Luke Antonacci	Junior	D	5' 9" (1.75 m)	171 lb (78 kg)	2002-11-26	Princeton, New Jersey	Sioux City Musketeers (USHL)	—
4	(United States)	Brandon Holt	Junior	D	5' 11" (1.8 m)	175 lb (79 kg)	2001-04-30	Grand Forks, North Dakota	New Mexico Ice Wolves (NAHL)	—
6	(United States)	Liam Lesakowski	Sophomore	D	6' 5" (1.96 m)	220 lb (100 kg)	2003-12-12	Buffalo, New York	Cedar Rapids RoughRiders (USHL)	—
7	(United States)	Brian Morse	Freshman	D	6' 1" (1.85 m)	165 lb (75 kg)	2003-02-06	Fresno, California	Chilliwack Chiefs (BCHL)	—
11	(United States)	Charlie Russell	Sophomore	F	5' 11" (1.8 m)	174 lb (79 kg)	2003-08-21	Houghton, Michigan	Green Bay Gamblers (USHL)	—
12	(United States)	Owen Fowler	Junior	F	5' 9" (1.75 m)	182 lb (83 kg)	2002-06-04	Tewksbury, Massachusetts	Massachusetts Lowell (HEA)	—
14	(United States)	Sully Scholle	Sophomore	F	5' 10" (1.78 m)	170 lb (77 kg)	2003-03-19	Chaska, Minnesota	New Mexico Ice Wolves (NAHL)	—
15	(United States)	Brandon Chabrier	Junior	D	6' 0" (1.83 m)	178 lb (81 kg)	2002-07-19	Bayville, New York	Madison Capitols (USHL)	—
16	(United States)	Aidan Carney	Junior	F	6' 4" (1.93 m)	195 lb (88 kg)	2001-09-08	Paradise Valley, Arizona	Amarillo Wranglers (NAHL)	—
17	(United States)	Ross Mitton	Graduate	F	5' 10" (1.78 m)	185 lb (84 kg)	2000-07-05	Copiague Harbor, New York	Colgate (ECAC)	—
18	(Canada)	Taylor Makar	Senior	F	6' 3" (1.91 m)	190 lb (86 kg)	2001-03-13	Calgary, Alberta	Massachusetts (AJHL)	COL, 220th overall 2021
20	(Canada)	Josh Nadeau	Sophomore	F	5' 8" (1.73 m)	158 lb (72 kg)	2003-10-22	Saint-François-de-Madawaska, New Brunswick	Penticton Vees (BCHL)	—
22	(United States)	Harrison Scott (A)	Senior	F	6' 0" (1.83 m)	185 lb (84 kg)	2000-09-27	San Jose, California	Bentley (AHA)	—
23	(Canada)	Grayson Arnott	Junior	D	5' 9" (1.75 m)	152 lb (69 kg)	2001-06-14	Toronto, Ontario	Penticton Vees (BCHL)	—
24	(Canada)	Nolan Renwick (A)	Junior	F	6' 3" (1.91 m)	211 lb (96 kg)	2001-02-16	Milestone, Saskatchewan	Omaha Lancers (USHL)	—
25	(United States)	Nicholas Niemo	Junior	F	5' 9" (1.75 m)	165 lb (75 kg)	2001-03-28	Middlebury, Vermont	Bentley (AHA)	—
26	(Scotland)	Thomas Freel (A)	Junior	F	5' 11" (1.8 m)	180 lb (82 kg)	2001-06-26	Aberdeen, Scotland	Ottawa Jr. Senators (CCHL)	—
27	(Canada)	Lynden Breen (C)	Graduate	F	5' 9" (1.75 m)	173 lb (78 kg)	2001-05-31	Grand Bay-Westfield, New Brunswick	Fargo Force (USHL)	—
28	(United States)	Anthony Calafiore	Sophomore	F	5' 9" (1.75 m)	170 lb (77 kg)	2002-04-06	Staten Island, New York	New Jersey Titans (NAHL)	—
29	(Canada)	Thomas Pichette	Freshman	F	5' 11" (1.8 m)	181 lb (82 kg)	2003-07-03	Maskinongé, Quebec	Penticton Vees (USHL)	—
30	(Sweden)	Albin Boija	Sophomore	G	6' 1" (1.85 m)	181 lb (82 kg)	2003-08-20	Sundsvall, Sweden	Växjö J20 (J20 Nationell)	—
34	(Canada)	Bodie Nobes	Sophomore	D	5' 10" (1.78 m)	185 lb (84 kg)	2003-07-18	Sainte-Thérèse, Quebec	Green Bay Gamblers (USHL)	—
35	(Canada)	Gage Stewart	Freshman	G	6' 0" (1.83 m)	190 lb (86 kg)	2003-06-17	Marathon, Ontario	Fort McMurray Oil Barons (AJHL)	—
37	(United States)	David Breazeale (C)	Senior	D	6' 4" (1.93 m)	201 lb (91 kg)	2000-04-22	Grandville, Michigan	Shreveport Mudbugs (NAHL)	—
38	(Finland)	Oskar Komarov	Freshman	F	5' 11" (1.8 m)	183 lb (83 kg)	2003-10-06	Uusikaarlepyy, Finland	Langley Rivermen (BCHL)	—
39	(Latvia)	Patriks Bērziņš	Freshman	G	6' 1" (1.85 m)	185 lb (84 kg)	2003-08-30	Talsi, Latvia	Tri-City Storm (USHL)	—
44	(United States)	Frank Djurasevic	Sophomore	D	6' 2" (1.88 m)	198 lb (90 kg)	2002-03-09	New Rochelle, New York	Merrimack (BCHL)	—

== Standings ==
2024–25 Hockey East Standings
	Conference record										Overall record					
	GP	W	L	T	OTW	OTL	SW	PTS	GF	GA	GP	W	L	T	GF	GA
#4 Boston College †	24	18	4	2	2	0	1	55	82	40	37	27	8	2	125	65
#8 Maine *	24	13	5	6	1	1	5	50	67	45	38	24	8	6	124	75
#2 Boston University	24	14	8	2	1	1	2	46	89	65	40	24	14	2	150	119
#7 Connecticut	24	12	8	4	3	2	1	40	76	65	39	23	12	4	130	97
#13 Providence	24	11	8	5	2	2	1	39	65	67	37	21	11	5	103	96
#10 Massachusetts	24	10	9	5	0	0	2	37	69	58	40	21	14	5	133	97
Massachusetts Lowell	24	8	13	3	0	1	2	30	57	69	36	16	16	4	93	101
Merrimack	24	9	14	1	1	0	1	28	57	81	35	13	21	1	81	112
Northeastern	24	7	14	3	1	1	2	26	48	71	37	14	20	3	88	112
New Hampshire	24	5	14	5	0	2	1	23	53	73	35	13	16	6	96	100
Vermont	24	6	16	2	2	3	1	22	59	88	35	11	21	3	100	116
Championship: March 21, 2025 † indicates regular season champion * indicates conference tournament champion (Lamoriello Trophy); Rankings: USCHO Division I Men's Poll

== Schedule and results ==
Date	Time	Opponent^{#}	Rank^{#}	Site	TV	Decision	Result	Attendance	Record
Regular Season
October 5	7:00 pm	American International*	#12	Alfond Arena • Orono, Maine	ESPN+	Boija	W 6–0	5,043	1–0–0
October 12	2:00 pm	Army*	#11	Alfond Arena • Orono, Maine (Exhibition)	ESPN+	Boija	W 5–0	3,652	
October 18	7:00 pm	#7 Quinnipiac*	#9	Alfond Arena • Orono, Maine	ESPN+	Boija	W 2–1	5,043	2–0–0
October 19	7:30 pm	#7 Quinnipiac*	#9	Alfond Arena • Orono, Maine	ESPN+	Boija	W 6–5 ^{OT}	5,043	3–0–0
October 25	7:00 pm	at Northeastern	#6	Matthews Arena • Boston, Massachusetts	ESPN+	Boija	W 4–1	4,521	4–0–0 (1–0–0)
October 26	7:00 pm	at Northeastern	#6	Matthews Arena • Boston, Massachusetts	ESPN+	Boija	T 2–2 ^{SOW}	4,739	4–0–1 (1–0–1)
November 1	7:30 pm	Merrimack	#7	Alfond Arena • Orono, Maine	ESPN+	Boija	W 5–0	4,585	5–0–1 (2–0–1)
November 2	7:30 pm	Merrimack	#7	Alfond Arena • Orono, Maine	ESPN+	Boija	W 6–0	4,796	6–0–1 (3–0–1)
November 8	7:00 pm	at #2 Boston College	#5	Conte Forum • Chestnut Hill, Massachusetts	ESPN+, NESN	Boija	L 2–3	7,884	6–1–1 (3–1–1)
November 9	7:00 pm	at #2 Boston College	#5	Conte Forum • Chestnut Hill, Massachusetts	ESPN+	Boija	L 0–3	7,195	6–2–1 (3–2–1)
November 15	7:00 pm	#11 Boston University	#7	Alfond Arena • Orono, Maine (Rivalry)	ESPN+	Boija	W 5–2	4,807	7–2–1 (4–2–1)
November 16	7:00 pm	#11 Boston University	#7	Alfond Arena • Orono, Maine (Rivalry)	ESPN+	Boija	T 2–2 ^{SOL}	5,043	7–2–2 (4–2–2)
November 22	7:00 pm	at New Hampshire	#5т	Whittemore Center • Durham, New Hampshire (Rivalry)	ESPN+, NESN	Boija	W 3–1	6,501	8–2–2 (5–2–2)
November 30	3:00 pm	at Rensselaer*	#5	Houston Field House • Troy, New York	ESPN+	Boija	W 6–0	2,117	9–2–2
December 1	3:00 pm	at Rensselaer*	#5	Houston Field House • Troy, New York	ESPN+	Boija	W 6–2	1,662	10–2–2
December 7	2:00 pm	Stonehill*	#5	Alfond Arena • Orono, Maine	ESPN+	Boija	W 5–2	4,518	11–2–2
December 8	3:00 pm	Stonehill*	#5	Alfond Arena • Orono, Maine	ESPN+	Berzins	W 4–2	4,468	12–2–2
December 29	4:00 pm	vs. Bentley*	#4	Cross Insurance Arena • Portland, Maine	ESPN+	Boija	L 2–4	5,893	12–3–2
January 3	7:00 pm	#6 Denver*	#7	Alfond Arena • Orono, Maine	ESPNU	Boija	L 1–2	5,043	12–4–2
January 4	7:00 pm	#6 Denver*	#7	Alfond Arena • Orono, Maine	ESPN+	Boija	W 2–1	5,043	13–4–2
January 10	7:15 pm	at #8 Massachusetts Lowell	#7	Tsongas Center • Lowell, Massachusetts	ESPN+	Boija	W 3–1	5,462	14–4–2 (6–2–2)
January 11	6:05 pm	at #8 Massachusetts Lowell	#7	Tsongas Center • Lowell, Massachusetts	ESPN+, NESN	Boija	W 2–1	6,005	15–4–2 (7–2–2)
January 17	7:00 pm	#17 Connecticut	#5	Alfond Arena • Orono, Maine	ESPN+	Boija	L 2–4	4,747	15–5–2 (7–3–2)
January 18	7:00 pm	#17 Connecticut	#5	Alfond Arena • Orono, Maine	ESPN+	Boija	T 2–2 ^{SOW}	4,836	15–5–3 (7–3–3)
January 31	7:00 pm	Northeastern	#6	Alfond Arena • Orono, Maine	ESPN+	Boija	W 3–1	4,905	16–5–3 (8–3–3)
February 2	4:00 pm	#20 Massachusetts	#6	Alfond Arena • Orono, Maine	ESPN+	Boija	W 3–2	4,689	17–5–3 (9–3–3)
February 7	7:00 pm	at #7 Providence	#5	Schneider Arena • Providence, Rhode Island	ESPN+	Boija	T 3–3 ^{SOW}	2,720	17–5–4 (9–3–4)
February 8	6:00 pm	at #7 Providence	#5	Schneider Arena • Providence, Rhode Island	ESPN+	Boija	W 1–0 ^{OT}	2,797	18–5–4 (10–3–4)
February 14	7:00 pm	New Hampshire	#5	Alfond Arena • Orono, Maine (Rivalry)	ESPN+	Boija	T 1–1 ^{SOW}	5,043	18–5–5 (10–3–5)
February 15	7:00 pm	New Hampshire	#5	Alfond Arena • Orono, Maine (Rivalry)	ESPN+, NESN	Boija	W 5–2	5,043	19–5–5 (11–3–5)
February 21	7:00 pm	at #11 Connecticut	#4	Toscano Family Ice Forum • Storrs, Connecticut	ESPN+, NESN	Boija	L 2–3 ^{OT}	2,693	19–6–5 (11–4–5)
February 28	7:00 pm	Vermont	#5	Alfond Arena • Orono, Maine	ESPN+	Boija	W 4–1	4,703	20–6–5 (12–4–5)
March 1	7:00 pm	Vermont	#5	Alfond Arena • Orono, Maine	ESPN+	Boija	W 4–3	5,043	21–6–5 (13–4–5)
March 7	7:00 pm	at #16 Massachusetts	#5	Mullins Center • Amherst, Massachusetts	ESPN+, NESN	Boija	L 1–5	6,251	21–7–5 (13–5–5)
March 8	6:00 pm	at #16 Massachusetts	#5	Mullins Center • Amherst, Massachusetts	ESPN+	Boija	T 2–2 ^{SOW}	5,182	21–7–6 (13–5–6)
Hockey East Tournament
March 15	6:00 pm	#19 Massachusetts Lowell*	#5	Alfond Arena • Orono, Maine (Hockey East Quarterfinal)	ESPN+	Boija	W 7–1	5,043	22–7–6
March 20	7:30 pm	vs. Northeastern*	#4	TD Garden • Boston, Massachusetts (Hockey East Semifinal)	ESPN+, NESN+	Boija	W 4–3 ^{2OT}	14,313	23–7–6
March 21	7:30 pm	vs. #7 Connecticut*	#4	TD Garden • Boston, Massachusetts (Hockey East Championship)	ESPN+, NESN+	Boija	W 5–2	17,605	24–7–6
NCAA Tournament
March 28	8:30 pm	vs. #12 Penn State*	#4	PPL Center • Allentown, Pennsylvania (Regional Semifinal)	ESPN2	Boija	L 1–5	7,358	24–8–6
*Non-conference game. ^{#}Rankings from USCHO.com Poll. All times are in Eastern Time. Source:

== NCAA tournament ==
March 28, 2025; 8:30 pm	(1) Maine	1–5 (1–3, 0–1, 0–1)	(4) Penn State	PPL Center; Attendance: 7,358

Game reference

Albin Boija
Goalies
Arsenii Sergeev
Referees:
C. J. Hanafin
Cameron Lynch
Linesmen:
Patrick Dapuzzo
John Rey

(unassisted) Bodie Nobes (1) – 04:10	1–0
	1–1	05:04 – PP – J. J. Wiebusch (13) (Cerrato, Fink)
	1–2	14:26 – Matt DiMarsico (15) (Wiebusch, Cerrato)
	1–3	18:08 – PP – Dane Dowiak (10) (Dzhaniyev, Mack)
	1–4	25:41 – Matt DiMarsico (16) (Cerrato)
	1–5	56:37 – EN – Dane Dowiak (11) (unassisted)

10 min
Penalties
4 min
27
Shots
34

Game summary
The final game of the First Round began fast with both teams looking to prove themselves early. After a few rushes by both sides, the puck came to into the Maine zone about 2 minutes in. While no scoring chance occurred, Reese Laubach took a high crosscheck and crashed to the ice next to the net. After he skated off with an apparent injury, the Bears pushed the puck up the ice and established themselves in the zone. They got the puck to the front of the net and while the puck was slapped away by Keaton Peters, it deflected up into the air, arced over the shoulder of Arsenii Sergeev and landed in the net. The goal had a lengthy official review and determined that the hit on Laubach was not worthy of a major penalty and allowed the goal to stand. When play resumed, Penn State got right into the offensive zone and Albin Boija was forced to stop a pair of chances in quick succession. Just before the 50-minute mark, the PSU attack drew the game's first penalty when Thomas Freel was handed a boarding minor. Less than 10 seconds later, a cross crease pass gave J. J. Wiebusch a clear shot at a goal and he quickly tied the game. The fast pace continued after the goal and the teams alternated chances and both forechecked hard. Near the middle of the frame, Maine once again went a little over the line and Charlie Russell was handed a boarding penalty. The Nittany Lions carried the play in the early part of the man-advantage but Maine was able to keep them from scoring. In the second half of the penalty, Maine was able to get a glorious shorthanded chance but Owen Fowler's shot was deflected wide. A few seconds later, Charlie Cerrato was handed a boarding penalty and ended the PSU power play 30 seconds early. The brief 4-on-4 play saw both teams try to gain the upper hand but the defenses held. Once the Maine power play began, the Bears quickly got set up in the offensive zone but they had trouble getting the puck through to the net. Sergeev only had to make one save late and the Lions killed off the remainder of the time. Shortly afterwards, Taylor Makar rushed the puck deep into the Black Bears' end but he took a spill and crashed into the boards. Luckily, he got right back to his feet and looked to have escaped injury. With about 6 minutes to play, the referees missed what appeared to be a high-sticking penalty by Maine. Instead of complaining, Penn State skated right down the ice and got the puck to a streaking Matt DiMarsico. The forward fought off a hook from the defense and then fired the puck high into the far corner. On the return to action, Dylan Lugris was handed a minor for slashing to give Maine its second man-advantage. Furious work from both sides saw the Bears fire several shots on goal but in their zeal to keep the pressure on, Freel committed a hooking penalty on an attempted clear and it was Maine's turn to lose it power play early. The Lions spent most of their man-advantage struggling to find room but, just as it was winding down, Penn State fired the uck towards the net and the puck deflected in off of Dane Dowiak skate. Maine challenged the play for offsides but the officials allowed the goal to stand. Once play resumed the speed increased, if anything. Both teams played hard until the horn sounded but it was Penn State that carried the balance of play.

The second period began with Maine skating fast and trying to break into the Penn State zone while the Nittany Lions countered with a more reserved attack. PSU was content to wait for their opportunities and they were rewarded with a breakaway just two minutes in but Boija was able to stop Aiden Fink with his glove. The Black Bears shook off the near-miss and continued to pressure Penn State but were unable to find the net. Just past the 5-minute mark, David Breazeale threw a blind pass behind his own net but the only one in the area was Charlie Cerrato. The Lion forward found DiMarsico in front of the net and the sophomore made no mistake, burying his second of the night into the top corner. With a 3-goal lead now, Penn State had little reason to go away from their defense-first game even with half of the match still to be played. Despite Maine pressing hard in the offensive zone, the Lions counterattack was getting the better chances and Boija had to work just to keep his team in the match. Maine was almost able to get one back with about 7 minutes to play when the puck bounced out of Sergeev's glove but it slid past the outside of the post. Physical play afterwards saw both teams throwing the body around and Dowiak was slow to get up. Shortly after, Cerrato crashed into Boija, hitting the goaltender high and nocking his head into the post. After an injury stoppage, the Swede was able to continue. Neither team shied away from contact as Manie tried to force their way into the Penn State end but the Nittany Lions would not oblige. PSU's patience continued to be rewarded with the best chances and Cerrato was inches away from finding a goal with 2 minutes to play but the angle on his shot was just a little off. The final moments passed by with little effect and had Penn State up by three going into the final period.

Almost as soon as the players got back onto the ice the hitting resumed. Early on, Maine was finally able to establish some offensive zone time and on their second entry they were able to get some scoring chances on goal. Penn State nearly countered with a 2-on-0 but the puck ended up rolling into the corner. Past the 5-minute mark, Bodie Nobes crashed into his own net, taking out Boija and Fink in the process, but no one was injured on the play. As time ticked away, Maine's chances at getting back into the game became increasingly remote. As the period progressed, Penn State seemed to be getting stronger and didn't allow Maine to stay in their zone for long. Near the middle of the period, Nicholas DeGraves got the puck right in the slot in front of the Maine net. His shot went wide but concurrent with the chance he was hit hard by Makar and crashed to the ice in pain. Despite protests from the Penn State bench, no penalty was called on the play. Maine began upping their offensive pressure and was able to get the puck deep into the PSU zone but the Nittany Lions' defense blocked a pair of opportunities. About a minute later, Josh Nadeau took a slashing penalty, costing Maine vital time that they could ill afford. However, just like Penn State had earlier, Maine was able to get a few solid shorthanded chances on Sergeev As they were going for a third scoring chance, Harrison Scott was called for crosschecking and put Maine on the defensive for another 2 minutes. Boija was forced to make several stellar saves during the extended power play but did not allow the Lions to score. Back at even strength, Maine had just 6 minutes remaining to find 3 goals but still found it difficult to fight through the Penn State defense. After forcing an offensive zone draw, Boija was pulled for an extra attacker giving the Bears 6 skaters with just over 4 minutes to play. However, despite their best efforts, Penn State was able to turn over the puck and Dowiak was able to skate down the ice and deposit his second of the night into an open goal. The game calmed down a little after the marker but Maine continued to skate, refusing to knuckle under in spite of the score. The final minutes were completed without too many fireworks and ended with Penn State as the clear victor.

== Scoring statistics ==
Name	Position	Games	Goals	Assists	Points	PIM
Taylor Makar	C/LW	38	18	17	35	26
Harrison Scott	C/LW	38	18	12	30	47
Josh Nadeau	LW/RW	37	10	19	29	14
Frank Djurasevic	D	38	7	21	28	14
Charlie Russell	F	35	7	19	26	24
Nolan Renwick	LW/RW	38	9	15	24	22
Owen Fowler	LW	38	10	10	20	16
Brandon Holt	D	34	4	16	20	12
Thomas Freel	C	38	11	7	18	20
Sully Scholle	F	38	3	13	16	8
Lynden Breen	C/LW	22	7	6	13	18
David Breazeale	D	38	3	10	13	10
Ross Mitton	LW/RW	32	4	7	11	38
Brandon Chabrier	D	37	0	10	10	25
Oskar Komarov	RW	37	2	5	7	4
Nicholas Niemo	F	23	3	2	5	21
Thomas Pichette	C	19	2	3	5	0
Bodie Nobes	D	21	1	4	5	4
John Dalton	D	21	0	5	5	21
Luke Antonacci	D	30	2	2	4	6
Grayson Arnott	D	20	2	0	2	4
Anthony Calafiore	RW	21	1	0	1	4
Albin Boija	G	37	0	1	1	0
Patriks Bērziņš	G	2	0	0	0	0
Aidan Carney	F	5	0	0	0	2
Liam Lesakowski	D	24	0	0	0	8
Bench	–	–	–	–	–	6
Total			124	204	328	374

== Goaltending statistics ==
Name	Games	Minutes	Wins	Losses	Ties	Goals against	Saves	Shut outs	SV %	GAA
Patriks Bērziņš	2	67:00	1	0	0	2	18	0	.900	1.79
Albin Boija	37	2269:53	23	8	6	69	886	4	.928	1.82
Empty Net	-	15:06	-	-	-	4	-	-	-	-
Total	38	2351:59	24	8	6	75	904	5	.923	1.91

Note: Bērziņš and Boija shared the shutout against Merrimack on November 2.

== Rankings ==
Poll	Week																											
Poll	Pre	1	2	3	4	5	6	7	8	9	10	11	12	13	14	15	16	17	18	19	20	21	22	23	24	25	26	27 (Final)
USCHO.com	12	11	9	6	7	5	7	5т	5	5	5 (2)	4 (1)	–	7	7	5	6	6	5	5	4	5	5	4	4	4	–	8
USA Hockey	11	10	10	6	6	5	7	6	5	5	5	4 (1)	–	7	7	6т	7	6	5	5	5	5	4	5	4	4	7	7

Note: USCHO did not release a poll in week 12 or 26.
Note: USA Hockey did not release a poll in week 12.

== Awards and honors ==
Player	Award	Ref
Albin Boija	AHCA All-American East Second Team	
Albin Boija	William Flynn Tournament Most Valuable Player	
Albin Boija	All-Hockey East Second Team	
Brandon Holt	All-Hockey East Third Team	
Albin Boija	Hockey East All-Tournament Team	
Luke Antonacci	Hockey East All-Tournament Team	
David Breazeale	Hockey East All-Tournament Team	
Owen Fowler	Hockey East All-Tournament Team	
Harrison Scott	Hockey East All-Tournament Team	
