= 2024–25 UConn Huskies men's ice hockey season =

Connecticut Ice, Champion NCAA Tournament, Regional Finals
- Conference: 4th Hockey East
- Home ice: Toscano Family Ice Forum; XL Center

Rankings
- USCHO: #7
- USA Hockey: #9

Record
- Overall: 23–12–4
- Conference: 12–8–4
- Home: 12–4–1
- Road: 7–5–3
- Neutral: 3–2–0

Coaches and captains
- Head coach: Mike Cavanaugh
- Assistant coaches: Tyler Helton; Vince Stalletti; Nick Peruzzi
- Captain: Hudson Schandor
- Alternate captain(s): John Spetz; Ryan Tattle

The 2024–25 UConn Huskies men's ice hockey season was the 65th season of play for the program, the 27th at the Division I level, and the 11th in Hockey East. The Huskies represented the University of Connecticut in the 2024–25 NCAA Division I men's ice hockey season, played their home games at the Toscano Family Ice Forum and were coached by Mike Cavanaugh in his 12th season.

== Season ==
After a disappointing season in '24, Connecticut received even worse news when top prospect Matthew Wood announced that he was transferring. The loss of their 2-time scoring leader was bad enough but the Huskies also lost several other players, including their entire stable of goaltenders. While UConn was able to dip into the transfer portal for a few new pieces, most of the incoming players were freshmen. With such a young roster to work with, UConn was not expected to do much this season.

Tyler Muszelik was given the starting job in goal entering the year as he was not only the only goaltender on the roster with any college experience but Callum Tung had been injured prior to the start of the year. Muszelik did well for the first month or so but his game began to sour in mid-November. After a poor weekend against Merrimack he rebounded with a solid performance versus Boston College, however, the junior was forced to leave after the second period due to a knee injury and would be out until January. Fortunately for the Huskies, that injury happened just after Tung had returned to practice and the freshman was available to take over in goal. In the freshman first active of the year, he posted several outstanding results and allowed 4 goals in three games, all against ranked opponents.

Despite UConn receiving quality goaltending for most of the first half of the year, the team could only boast a .500 record as they went into the winter break. The main culprit was an inconsistent offense that had been held to under 3 goals in five of the last eight games. Jake Richard had been the leading force for the Huskies but had missed five games in November due to an upper-body injury. Team captain Hudson Schandor picked up the pace in his absence but didn't receive much help for the rest of the team. However, once the team returned from the break the Huskies saw a marked increase in the output from Joey Muldowney. The sophomore had posted a respectable total of 10 points in the first 15 games but his performance in the second half dwarfed that result. From their match with Alaska onward, Muldowney was held off the scoresheet only three times and put up 37 more points in the second half of the year.

Complimenting the increased scoring was the combined efforts in goal from Muszelik and Tung. With both goaltenders finally healthy, the two alternated starts for the second half of the year and Connecticut benefited mightily from their full roster. The Huskies lost just 2 games after the first of the year and swiftly shot up the national rankings. The gaudy win totals were made even more impressive by UConn earning six victories against ranked teams. The team posted an outstanding record in the second half, finishing 10 games above .500 despite playing one of the toughest scheduled in the nation. The result was that not only was UConn able to rise up to #4 in the Hockey East standings but the team jumped up into the top 10 of the PairWise rankings. This meant that the Huskies were guaranteed to earn an at-large bid to the NCAA tournament, ending the programs decades-long chase for a tournament berth.

=== Postseason ===
UConn began their postseason with a bye into the conference quarterfinal round. In their final home game of the year, the Huskies hosted another tournament-bound team in Providence. Muszelik got the start and allowed a short-handed goal less than 4 minutes into the match. He recovered quickly and turned aside every succeeding shot, giving the Huskies plenty of time to make up the difference. Richard and Muldowney combined to lead the offense down the stretch, resulting in three goals with the two forwards having a hand in all three. The semifinal saw a similar story, this time with Tung surrendering a power play marker in the first 10 minutes of the match to Boston University. UConn came out charging in the second and scored three goals in under nine minutes. The third saw Muldowney finish off a natural hat-trick with Richard assisting on each of his goals. BU tacked on one more goal with 10 seconds to play but that did nothing to stop Connecticut from advancing to the championship game.

For the third consecutive game, UConn fell down early, allowing Maine to gain the upper hand, however, this time the Huskies' luck ran out. Instead of being able to hold off the opposing offense, Muszelik was beaten twice more while the Connecticut offense was silent. Entering the third period, with the Huskies down 0–3, the team was forced to abandon any pretense at defense and try to throw everything at the Black Bears' net. Tabor Heaslip tried to become the hero by scoring twice but each of his goals were answered by Maine and UConn opportunity to earn a Hockey East championship slipped away.

Despite the disappointing loss, UConn still had to get themselves ready for the NCAA tournament. Thanks to their outstanding run in the second half, the Huskies received a #2 seed and were set opposite in-stare rival Quinnipiac in the Allentown Regional. While the Bobcats wanted revenge for their loss during the Connecticut Ice tournament earlier in the year, UConn had no intention of simply enjoying their national tournament debut. The Huskies' depth came up big in the match with Hugh Larkin and Ethan Gardula both netting goals in the first. Quinnipiac was able to cut the lead in half around the midway point of the game but that was the only goal that Tung let in. Two more Connecticut goals sealed the deal for the team and the huskies advanced to the Regional Final.

With the team just one win away from the first Frozen Four, the Huskies abandoned their goaltender rotation and allowed Tung to start consecutive games for the first time in three months. Muldowney gave his goaltender early support by opening the scoring just over 3 minutes into the game with his 29th of the year. Penn State was no pushover and was able to even the score about 10 minutes later. Both teams were skating up and down the ice, forcing the netminders to stay on top of their game and Tung looked fully capable of carrying his team to victory. It wasn't until the second half of the match that Heaslip was able to give UConn their second lead of the game, however, the Nittany Lions were able to respond just 30 seconds later. The rest of regulation features several chances with UConn firing 14 shots in the third but neither side could find the back of the net so overtime was required. Connecticut remained on the attack and fired another 14 shots in the extra period but nothing could get through the Penns State goaltender. With the period winding down, the Lions turned the puck over at the UConn blueline, broke in, and beat Tung high-blocker. The goal ended UConn's season, unequivocally the best year the program had ever seen.

== Departures ==
Player	Position	Nationality	Cause
Jake Black	Forward	United States	Transferred to Bentley
Chase Bradley	Forward	United States	Signed professional contract (Colorado Avalanche)
Nick Capone	Forward	United States	Graduation (signed with Lehigh Valley Phantoms)
Mark D'Agostino	Forward	United States	Transferred to Endicott
Jake Flynn	Defenseman	United States	Graduation (signed with Greenville Swamp Rabbits)
Ethan Haider	Goaltender	United States	Graduation (signed with Milwaukee Admirals)
Andrew Lucas	Defenseman	United States	Graduation (signed with San Diego Gulls)
Ryan Mahshie	Forward	Canada	Graduation (signed with Orlando Solar Bears)
Matt Pasquale	Goaltender	United States	Graduation (retired)
Harrison Rees	Defenseman	Canada	Graduation (signed with Fort Wayne Komets)
Samu Salminen	Forward	Finland	Transferred to Denver
Arseni Sergeyev	Goaltender	Russia	Transferred to Penn State
Jake Veilleux	Defenseman/Forward	United States	Left program (retired)
Matthew Wood	Forward	Canada	Transferred to Minnesota

== Recruiting ==
Player	Position	Nationality	Age	Notes
Nick Carabin	Defenseman	United States	24	Mahwah, NJ; graduate transfer from Princeton
Kevin Fitzgerald	Defenseman	Canada	19	Bath, ON
Ethan Gardula	Forward	United States	19	Princeton, MA
Viking Gustafsson Nyberg	Defenseman	Sweden	21	Stockholm, SWE; transfer from Northern Michigan
Thomas Heaney	Goaltender	United States	21	Oceanport, NJ
Kai Janviriya	Defenseman	United States	19	Bloomfield, MI
Hugh Larkin	Forward	United States	25	Livonia, MI; graduate transfer from Western Michigan
Mike Murtagh	Forward	United States	20	East Greenbush, NY
Tyler Muszelik	Goaltender	United States	20	Long Valley, NJ; transfer from New Hampshire; selected 189th overall in 2022
Trey Scott	Defenseman	United States	20	Lunenburg, MA
Kaden Shahan	Forward	United States	19	Everett, WA
Filip Sitar	Forward	Slovenia	19	Ljubljana, SLO
Callum Tung	Goaltender	Canada	20	Port Moody, BC
Ethan Whitcomb	Forward	Canada	20	St. Catharines, ON

== Roster ==
As of September 24, 2024.

No.	Nat.	Player	Class	Pos	Height	Weight	DoB	Hometown	Previous team	NHL rights
2	(United States)	Jack Pascucci	Junior	D	6' 2" (1.88 m)	195 lb (88 kg)	2002-02-15	North Andover, Massachusetts	Des Moines Buccaneers (USHL)	—
3	(Canada)	Kevin Fitzgerald	Freshman	D	5' 10" (1.78 m)	150 lb (68 kg)	2004-10-11	Bath, Ontario	Sioux City Musketeers (USHL)	—
5	(United States)	Bauer Swift	Sophomore	D	6' 1" (1.85 m)	190 lb (86 kg)	2002-06-17	West Hartford, Connecticut	Lone Star Brahmas (NAHL)	—
6	(Sweden)	Viking Gustafsson Nyberg	Sophomore	D	6' 6" (1.98 m)	205 lb (93 kg)	2003-09-21	Stockholm, Sweden	Northern Michigan (CCHA)	—
7	(United States)	Huston Karpman	Junior	F	5' 11" (1.8 m)	200 lb (91 kg)	2001-02-07	Manhattan Beach, California	Minot Minotauros (NAHL)	—
8	(United States)	Joey Muldowney	Sophomore	F	5' 11" (1.8 m)	154 lb (70 kg)	2004-06-05	Lake View, New York	Des Moines Buccaneers (USHL)	SJS, 172nd overall 2022
9	(Canada)	Ryan Tattle (A)	Junior	F	5' 10" (1.78 m)	180 lb (82 kg)	2001-09-07	Port Moody, British Columbia	Coquitlam Express (BCHL)	—
10	(Canada)	Tristan Fraser	Junior	F	6' 0" (1.83 m)	190 lb (86 kg)	2001-11-13	West Vancouver, British Columbia	Nanaimo Clippers (BCHL)	—
11	(United States)	Kai Janviriya	Freshman	D	5' 8" (1.73 m)	170 lb (77 kg)	2005-04-02	Bloomfield, Michigan	Lincoln Stars (USHL)	—
12	(United States)	Oliver Flynn	Sophomore	F	6' 1" (1.85 m)	205 lb (93 kg)	1998-05-17	Wolcott, Connecticut	Madison (USHL)	—
13	(United States)	Ethan Gardula	Freshman	F	5' 11" (1.8 m)	174 lb (79 kg)	2005-02-28	Princeton, Massachusetts	Sioux City Musketeers (USHL)	—
15	(United States)	Thomas Messineo	Junior	D	6' 0" (1.83 m)	190 lb (86 kg)	2002-05-02	Westwood, Massachusetts	Chilliwack Chiefs (BCHL)	—
17	(United States)	Jake Percival	Junior	F	5' 10" (1.78 m)	180 lb (82 kg)	2002-02-11	Avon, Connecticut	Cedar Rapids RoughRiders (USHL)	—
18	(United States)	John Spetz (A)	Graduate	D	5' 10" (1.78 m)	195 lb (88 kg)	1999-12-01	Oak Ridge, New Jersey	Chicago Steel (USHL)	—
19	(United States)	Jake Richard	Sophomore	F	6' 1" (1.85 m)	194 lb (88 kg)	2004-08-15	Jacksonville, Florida	Tri-City Storm (USHL)	BUF, 170th overall 2022
20	(United States)	Kaden Shahan	Freshman	F	5' 11" (1.8 m)	170 lb (77 kg)	2005-05-24	Everett, Washington	Sioux City Musketeers (USHL)	—
21	(United States)	Trey Scott	Freshman	D	5' 10" (1.78 m)	181 lb (82 kg)	2004-05-04	Lunenburg, Massachusetts	Omaha Lancers (USHL)	—
22	(Canada)	Hudson Schandor (C)	Graduate	F	5' 8" (1.73 m)	165 lb (75 kg)	2000-09-29	North Vancouver, British Columbia	Surrey Eagles (BCHL)	—
23	(United States)	Tabor Heaslip	Junior	F	5' 9" (1.75 m)	175 lb (79 kg)	2001-12-17	Frisco, Texas	Sioux City Musketeers (USHL)	—
26	(United States)	Mike Murtagh	Freshman	F	5' 11" (1.8 m)	187 lb (85 kg)	2004-09-11	East Greenbush, New York	Nanaimo Clippers (BCHL)	—
27	(United States)	Nick Carabin	Graduate	D	5' 10" (1.78 m)	175 lb (79 kg)	2000-04-30	Mahwah, New Jersey	Princeton (ECAC)	—
28	(United States)	Hugh Larkin	Graduate	F	6' 2" (1.88 m)	205 lb (93 kg)	1999-03-27	Livonia, Michigan	Western Michigan (NCHC)	—
29	(Slovenia)	Filip Sitar	Freshman	F	5' 11" (1.8 m)	183 lb (83 kg)	2005-06-29	Ljubljana, Slovenia	Malmö Redhawks J20 (J20 Nationell)	—
30	(United States)	Tyler Muszelik	Junior	G	6' 3" (1.91 m)	190 lb (86 kg)	2004-07-01	Long Valley, New Jersey	New Hampshire (HEA)	FLA, 189th overall 2022
31	(Canada)	Callum Tung	Freshman	G	6' 3" (1.91 m)	198 lb (90 kg)	2003-11-23	Port Moody, British Columbia	Alberni Valley Bulldogs (BCHL)	—
32	(United States)	Thomas Heaney	Freshman	G	6' 1" (1.85 m)	170 lb (77 kg)	2003-02-02	Oceanport, New Jersey	Maine Nordiques (NAHL)	—
34	(Canada)	Owen Simpson	Sophomore	D	6' 5" (1.96 m)	190 lb (86 kg)	2003-07-01	Toronto, Ontario	Penticton (BCHL)	—
71	(Canada)	Ethan Whitcomb	Freshman	F	6' 4" (1.93 m)	209 lb (95 kg)	2004-05-13	St. Catharines, Ontario	Muskegon Lumberjacks (USHL)	—

== Standings ==
2024–25 Hockey East Standings
	Conference record										Overall record					
	GP	W	L	T	OTW	OTL	SW	PTS	GF	GA	GP	W	L	T	GF	GA
#4 Boston College †	24	18	4	2	2	0	1	55	82	40	37	27	8	2	125	65
#8 Maine *	24	13	5	6	1	1	5	50	67	45	38	24	8	6	124	75
#2 Boston University	24	14	8	2	1	1	2	46	89	65	40	24	14	2	150	119
#7 Connecticut	24	12	8	4	3	2	1	40	76	65	39	23	12	4	130	97
#13 Providence	24	11	8	5	2	2	1	39	65	67	37	21	11	5	103	96
#10 Massachusetts	24	10	9	5	0	0	2	37	69	58	40	21	14	5	133	97
Massachusetts Lowell	24	8	13	3	0	1	2	30	57	69	36	16	16	4	93	101
Merrimack	24	9	14	1	1	0	1	28	57	81	35	13	21	1	81	112
Northeastern	24	7	14	3	1	1	2	26	48	71	37	14	20	3	88	112
New Hampshire	24	5	14	5	0	2	1	23	53	73	35	13	16	6	96	100
Vermont	24	6	16	2	2	3	1	22	59	88	35	11	21	3	100	116
Championship: March 21, 2025 † indicates regular season champion * indicates conference tournament champion (Lamoriello Trophy); Rankings: USCHO Division I Men's Poll

== Schedule and results ==
Date	Time	Opponent^{#}	Rank^{#}	Site	TV	Decision	Result	Attendance	Record
Regular Season
October 4	7:30 pm	Colgate*		Toscano Family Ice Forum • Storrs, Connecticut	ESPN+	Muszelik	W 4–2	2,300	1–0–0
October 5	7:30 pm	Colgate*		Toscano Family Ice Forum • Storrs, Connecticut	ESPN+	Muszelik	W 6–2	2,275	2–0–0
October 11	7:00 pm	at Holy Cross*		Hart Center • Worcester, Massachusetts	FloHockey	Muszelik	L 3–4	1,063	2–1–0
October 12	3:30 pm	Holy Cross*		Toscano Family Ice Forum • Storrs, Connecticut	ESPN+	Muszelik	W 3–1	2,584	3–1–0
October 18	7:00 pm	at #3 Boston University		Agganis Arena • Boston, Massachusetts	ESPN+, NESN	Heaney	L 2–4	5,074	3–2–0 (0–1–0)
October 25	7:00 pm	at #15 Massachusetts		Mullins Center • Amherst, Massachusetts	ESPN+	Muszelik	T 3–3 ^{SOL}	8,412	3–2–1 (0–1–1)
October 26	7:00 pm	#15 Massachusetts		Toscano Family Ice Forum • Storrs, Connecticut	ESPN+	Muszelik	W 3–2	2,424	4–2–1 (1–1–1)
November 2	3:30 pm	Vermont		XL Center • Hartford, Connecticut	ESPN+	Muszelik	L 0–1 ^{OT}	3,029	4–3–1 (1–2–1)
November 3	3:00 pm	Vermont		Toscano Family Ice Forum • Storrs, Connecticut	ESPN+	Muszelik	W 6–5 ^{OT}	2,279	5–3–1 (2–2–1)
November 8	7:00 pm	at Merrimack		J. Thom Lawler Rink • North Andover, Massachusetts	ESPN+	Muszelik	L 1–4	2,401	5–4–1 (2–3–1)
November 9	3:30 pm	Merrimack		Toscano Family Ice Forum • Storrs, Connecticut	ESPN+	Muszelik	L 2–5	2,363	5–5–1 (2–4–1)
November 15	7:00 pm	#2 Boston College		Toscano Family Ice Forum • Storrs, Connecticut	ESPN+	Heaney	W 5–4	2,691	6–5–1 (3–4–1)
November 22	7:15 pm	at #15 Massachusetts Lowell		Tsongas Center • Lowell, Massachusetts	ESPN+	Tung	W 4–1	5,780	7–5–1 (4–4–1)
November 23	6:05 pm	at #15 Massachusetts Lowell		Tsongas Center • Lowell, Massachusetts	ESPN+	Tung	L 0–1	5,389	7–6–1 (4–5–1)
December 4	7:00 pm	at #3 Boston College		Conte Forum • Chestnut Hill, Massachusetts	ESPN+	Tung	L 1–2 ^{OT}	4,863	7–7–1 (4–6–1)
Holiday Face–Off
December 28	2:30 pm	vs. Alaska*		Fiserv Forum • Milwaukee, Wisconsin (Holiday Face–Off Semifinal)		Tung	W 4–1	6,625	8–7–1
December 29	5:00 pm	vs. Wisconsin*		Fiserv Forum • Milwaukee, Wisconsin (Holiday Face–Off Championship)		Heaney	L 3–4	4,920	8–8–1
Regular Season
January 4	7:00 pm	at Harvard*		Bright-Landry Hockey Center • Boston, Massachusetts	ESPN+	Tung	W 7–3	—	9–8–1
January 10	7:00 pm	at #17 New Hampshire		Whittemore Center • Durham, New Hampshire	ESPN+	Muszelik	W 4–1	5,491	10–8–1 (5–6–1)
January 11	3:30 pm	#17 New Hampshire		Toscano Family Ice Forum • Storrs, Connecticut	ESPN+	Tung	W 3–2	2,691	11–8–1 (6–6–1)
January 17	7:00 pm	at #5 Maine	#17	Alfond Arena • Orono, Maine	ESPN+	Muszelik	W 4–2	4,747	12–8–1 (7–6–1)
January 18	7:00 pm	at #5 Maine	#17	Alfond Arena • Orono, Maine	ESPN+	Tung	T 2–2 ^{SOL}	4,836	12–8–2 (7–6–2)
Connecticut Ice
January 24	4:00 pm	vs. #15 Quinnipiac*	#13	Martire Family Arena • Fairfield, Connecticut (Connecticut Ice Semifinal)	SNY	Muszelik	W 2–1	2,794	13–8–2
January 25	7:30 pm	at Sacred Heart*	#13	Martire Family Arena • Fairfield, Connecticut (Connecticut Ice Championship)	SNY	Muszelik	W 1–0	4,177	14–8–2
Regular Season
January 31	7:00 pm	at #7 Providence	#9	Schneider Arena • Providence, Rhode Island	ESPN+, NESN+	Muszelik	T 3–3 ^{SOW}	2,805	14–8–3 (7–6–3)
February 1	3:30 pm	#7 Providence	#9	XL Center • Hartford, Connecticut	ESPN+	Tung	L 3–6	11,781	14–9–3 (7–7–3)
February 7	4:00 pm	#18 Massachusetts	#11	Toscano Family Ice Forum • Storrs, Connecticut	ESPN+	Muszelik	L 4–5	2,691	14–10–3 (7–8–3)
February 8	3:30 pm	#10 Massachusetts Lowell	#11	XL Center • Hartford, Connecticut	ESPN+	Tung	W 5–4 ^{OT}	5,558	15–10–3 (8–8–3)
February 12	6:00 pm	Alaska Anchorage*	#11	Toscano Family Ice Forum • Storrs, Connecticut	ESPN+	Muszelik	W 5–2	2,292	16–10–3
February 21	7:30 pm	#5 Maine	#11	Toscano Family Ice Forum • Storrs, Connecticut	ESPN+, NESN	Tung	W 3–2 ^{OT}	2,691	17–10–3 (9–8–3)
February 25	7:00 pm	#10 Boston University	#9	Toscano Family Ice Forum • Storrs, Connecticut	ESPN+	Muszelik	T 2–2 ^{SOL}	2,691	17–10–4 (9–8–4)
February 28	7:00 pm	Northeastern	#9	Toscano Family Ice Forum • Storrs, Connecticut	ESPN+	Tung	W 5–2	2,691	18–10–4 (10–8–4)
March 1	7:30 pm	at Northeastern	#9	Matthews Arena • Boston, Massachusetts	ESPN+	Muszelik	W 7–1	3,008	19–10–4 (11–8–4)
March 6	7:00 pm	at Vermont	#8	Gutterson Fieldhouse • Burlington, Vermont	ESPN+	Tung	W 4–1	1,911	20–10–4 (12–8–4)
Hockey East Tournament
March 14	7:00 pm	#7 Providence*	#8	Toscano Family Ice Forum • Storrs, Connecticut (Hockey East Quarterfinal)	ESPN+, NESN	Muszelik	W 3–1	2,691	21–10–4
March 20	4:00 pm	vs. #8 Boston University*	#7	TD Garden • Boston, Massachusetts (Hockey East Semifinal)	ESPN+, NESN+	Tung	W 5–2	14,313	22–10–4
March 21	7:30 pm	vs. #4 Maine*	#7	TD Garden • Boston, Massachusetts (Hockey East Championship)	NESN, ESPN+	Muszelik	L 2–5	17,605	22–11–4
NCAA Tournament
March 28	5:00 pm	vs. #11 Quinnipiac*	#7	PPL Center • Allentown, Pennsylvania (Regional Semifinal)	ESPNU	Tung	W 4–1	7,358	23–11–4
March 30	4:30 pm	vs. #12 Penn State*	#7	PPL Center • Allentown, Pennsylvania (Regional Final)	ESPN2	Tung	L 2–3 ^{OT}	6,933	23–12–4
*Non-conference game. ^{#}Rankings from USCHO.com Poll. All times are in Eastern Time. Source:

== NCAA tournament ==
=== Regional semifinal ===
March 28, 2025; 5:00 pm	(2) Connecticut	4–1 (2–0, 1–1, 1–0)	(3) Quinnipiac	PPL Center; Attendance: 7,358

Game reference

Callum Tung
Goalies
Dylan Silverstein
Referees:
Brendan Blanchard
Ryan Sweeney
Linesmen:
Brendan Lewis
Joe Sherman

(Heaslip, Carabin) Hugh Larkin (3) – 08:25	1–0
(unassisted) Ethan Gardula (8) – GW – 14:32	2–0
	2–1	30:11 – Jeremy Wilmer (15) (Marcellus, Leddy)
(Percival, Spetz) Tristan Fraser (4) – 34:13	3–1
(Messineo) Joey Muldowney (28) – EN – 57:45	4–1

6 min
Penalties
4 min
22
Shots
22

Game summary
The start of the game saw Cooper Moore get crosschecked to the ice and then slide into his goal post but he was able to skate away without injury. The two teams were skating fast to start but both seemed to be trying to force the play a bit on offense and failed to connect on their opportunities. The first good chance came then Quinnipiac coughed up the puck behind their net but Dylan Silverstein was able to make the save on Tristan Fraser. The two teams skated up and down the ice for the next several minutes but produced very few shots on goal. Near the middle of the period, the Bobcats turned the puck over at their blueline and UConn was able to set up in the zone. After missing on their first chance, Hugh Larkin fired the puck top corner for Connecticut's first ever NCAA tournament goal. On the following attack, UConn was nearly able to double the lead but did end up forcing Travis Treloar into taking a slashing penalty. Quinnipiac's remade penalty kill was effective in keeping the Huskies to the outside and didn't give up a scoring chance on the disadvantage. Connecticut was able to get better chances once they were back at even strength but Silverstein was able to keep the puck out of the net. In the back half of the period, the Bobcat offense began to show signs of life but couldn't get much of a chance on the goal. Near the 5-minute mark, Quinnipiac made another mistake at its own blueline. Ethan Gardula was able to skate in alone and backhand the puck over the outstretched leg of Silverstein for the second goal of the match. After Quinnipiac was able to work the puck down low in the final minutes, Jake Richard was called for crosschecking to give the Bobcats their first power play of the game. With the #1 power play in the nation, Quinnipiac took the chance to get their first real scoring opportunity of the game but UConn's defense was able to prevent any further shots from getting on goal. Though they failed to score, the Bobcats' offense looked far better in the remaining few seconds and headed into the first intermission with momentum if nothing else.

The Huskies took control at the start of the second and Hudson Schandor had an open look right in front of the goal but Silverstein made the glove save. Kaden Shahan had another solo rush about a minute later but the puck rolled and he could only get a weak shot on goal. Quinnipiac tried to counter but they were unable to break through the UConn defense. Poor passing by the Bobcats did not help their efforts but Quinnipiac did eventually settle down and start to generate zone time in the Husky end. Connecticut battled back and kept the play mostly even until Jeremy Wilmer gloved the puck off of the faceoff and was handed a minor for the violation. It didn't take long for UConn to get a good chance at a goal but Silverstein's left toe made the stop on Richard. Just after the power play expired, UConn made a mistake just inside the Quinnipiac zone and gave up a 2-on-1 to the Bobcats Mason Marcellus made a brilliant backhand pass to Wilmer who lifted the puck over a sprawling Callum Tung to cut the lead in half. After a rush up the ice by Victor Czerneckianair, the two teams began to show some genuine dislike with some post-whistle roughhousing. While Quinnipiac looked like they had rediscovered their game, the team made a critical mistake when they turned over the puck down low. UConn fired the puck in from the point and it eventually found Fraser right in front of the goal who fired it past a helpless Silverstein to restore their lead. After the following faceoff, Quinnipiac went back on the attack and drew a penalty when John Spetz chopped down Elliott Groenewold's stick. UConn's penalty kill gave Quinnipiac fits, not only stopping the Bobcats from getting a good shot on goal but threatening to the Quinnipiac cage on more than one occasion. The Bobcats had better chances after their power play ended but they were unable to score again and ended the second still needing two goals.

Connecticut continued to press in the offensive zone from the start of the third. While they didn't get much in the way of scoring chances, their presence in the Bobcats' zone prevented Quinnipiac from getting their offense going. Eventually Jack Ricketts skated the puck up the ice and soon thereafter Wilmer briefly looked to have scored his second of the game but the puck hit the crossbar, bounced down behind Tung and was cleared by Viking Gustafsson Nyberg before it could roll into the goal. After the near-miss, Quinnipiac continued to probe away at the UConn defenses but the Huskies didn't give up any easy opportunities. Eventually, however, the constant attacking by the Bobcats resulted in Fraser taking an interference penalty. Quinnipiac's power play continued to have trouble finding a clear lane to the net and after a few turnovers again gave up the best chance to the Huskies. Just after the power play ended, Moore was tripped near the UConn net and kicked Tung in the head as he was going down. The netminder went down and was stunned momentarily but was able to continue after an injury stoppage. He was then immediately threatened after a UConn turnover but managed to made a glove save to preserve the 2-goal lead. Quinnipiac tried desperately to get something going offensively in the final 8 minutes but Connecticut refused to give an inch. With less than 4 minutes to play the Bobcats were finally able to get through to the UConn cage and nearly able to break through on a goal mouth scramble but Tung and the Husky defense held them back. Silverstein was pulled early for an extra attacker and the Bobcats were finally able to get something going when they had an additional player. With just over 2 minutes to play, Joey Muldowney cleared the puck down the ice. The disk was rolling, got on edge and curled into the Bobcat net to essentially end the match. The final seconds passed with both teams coming to that realization and it was UConn who could decisively claim the championship of the nutmeg state.

=== Regional final ===
March 30, 2025; 4:30 pm	(2) Connecticut	2–3 (OT) (1–1, 1–1, 0–0, 1–0)	(4) Penn State	PPL Center; Attendance: 6,933

Game reference

Callum Tung
Goalies
Arsenii Sergeev
Referees:
Ryan Hersey
Nathan Wieler
Linesmen:
Eric Contino
Tyler Liffrig

(Richard, Schandor) Joey Muldowney (29) – 3:09	1–0
	1–1	13:27 – Dane Dowiak (12) (Paquette, Peters)
(Gustafsson Nyberg, Spetz) Tabor Heaslip (8) – 31:27	2–1
	2–2	31:57 – J. J. Wiebusch (14) (Cerrato, Mack)
	2–3	77:56 – GW – Matt DiMarsico (17) (Cerrato)

4 min
Penalties
4 min
44
Shots
41

Game summary

== Scoring statistics ==
Name	Position	Games	Goals	Assists	Points	PIM
Joey Muldowney	RW	39	29	18	47	12
Jake Richard	LW/RW	34	15	28	43	16
Hudson Schandor	C	37	10	31	41	12
Ryan Tattle	F	39	18	14	32	22
Tabor Heaslip	F	39	8	13	21	22
Jake Percival	F	39	9	10	19	14
Ethan Gardula	LW	37	8	10	18	19
Trey Scott	D	36	3	14	17	8
Kaden Shahan	RW	39	9	5	14	4
Kai Janviriya	D	39	0	14	14	6
John Spetz	D	35	1	12	13	27
Tristan Fraser	F	39	4	8	12	18
Ethan Whitcomb	LW/RW	39	6	5	11	47
Viking Gustafsson Nyberg	D	39	1	10	11	27
Nick Carabin	D	39	3	6	9	16
Tom Messineo	D	39	1	8	9	20
Hugh Larkin	RW	32	3	3	6	37
Filip Sitar	C	31	1	2	3	2
Owen Simpson	D	5	0	2	2	0
Tyler Muszelik	G	23	0	2	2	0
Oliver Flynn	C	8	1	0	1	2
Jack Pascucci	D	10	0	1	1	4
Mike Murtagh	F	28	0	1	1	4
Thomas Heaney	G	3	0	0	0	0
Callum Tung	G	15	0	0	0	0
Huston Karpman	F	18	0	0	0	0
Total			130	217	347	339

== Goaltending statistics ==
Name	Games	Minutes	Wins	Losses	Ties	Goals against	Saves	Shut outs	SV %	GAA
Callum Tung	15	927:36	10	4	1	31	435	0	.933	2.01
Tyler Muszelik	23	1312:59	12	6	3	50	530	1	.914	2.28
Thomas Heaney	3	136:34	1	2	0	10	65	0	.867	4.39
Empty Net	-	19:25	-	-	-	6	-	-	-	-
Total	39	2396:34	23	12	4	97	1031	1	.909	2.43

== Rankings ==
Poll	Week																											
Poll	Pre	1	2	3	4	5	6	7	8	9	10	11	12	13	14	15	16	17	18	19	20	21	22	23	24	25	26	27 (Final)
USCHO.com	NR	NR	NR	NR	NR	NR	NR	NR	NR	NR	NR	NR	-	NR	RV	17	13	9	11	11	11	9	8	8	7	7	-	7
USA Hockey	NR	NR	NR	NR	NR	NR	NR	NR	NR	NR	NR	NR	-	NR	RV	17	12	9	10	10	10	9	8	9	8	7	8	9

Note: USCHO did not release a poll in week 12 or 26.
Note: USA Hockey did not release a poll in week 12.

== Awards and honors ==
Player	Award	Ref
Joey Muldowney	AHCA All-American East Second Team	
Hudson Schandor	Hockey East Best Defensive Forward	
Hudson Schandor	Len Ceglarski Award	
Mike Cavanaugh	Bob Kullen Coach of the Year Award	
Joey Muldowney	All-Hockey East Second Team	
Hudson Schandor	All-Hockey East Second Team	
Jake Richard	All-Hockey East Third Team	
Callum Tung	Hockey East All-Rookie Team	

== 2025 NHL entry draft ==
Round	Pick	Player	NHL team
6	168	Anthony Allain-Samake ^{†}	Anaheim Ducks
7	197	Brendan Dunphy ^{†}	Florida Panthers

† incoming freshman
