= 2024–25 Boston College Eagles men's ice hockey season =

Hockey East Regular Season, Champion NCAA Tournament, Regional Final
- Conference: 1st Hockey East
- Home ice: Kelley Rink

Rankings
- USCHO.com: #4
- USA Hockey: #4

Record
- Overall: 27–8–2
- Conference: 18–4–2
- Home: 14–3–0
- Road: 11–3–2
- Neutral: 2–2–0

Coaches and captains
- Head coach: Greg Brown
- Assistant coaches: Mike Ayers; Brendan Buckley; Brent Darnell
- Captain: Eamon Powell
- Alternate captain(s): Connor Joyce; Ryan Leonard; Mike Posma

The 2024–25 Boston College Eagles men's ice hockey season was the 103rd season of play for the program and the 41st in Hockey East. The Eagles represented Boston College in the 2024–25 NCAA Division I men's ice hockey season, played their home games at Kelley Rink and were coached by Greg Brown in his 3rd season.

== Season ==
After coming on, so close to a national championship, Boston College entered as one of the favorites for the title this season. The Eagles lost their top two scorers to the NHL but they replaced them with a trio high-value forwards, including two drafted players and the prospective #1 prospect in James Hagens. The defense lost a bit of depth but they drafted in another draft pick alongside Hagens' elder brother to plug the hole in the lineup. In goal, the team was set with Jacob Fowler returning as starter.

BC looked every bit a title contender from the start of the season. After splitting their opening series against Michigan State, another championship hopeful, the Eagles dominated their opposition and won game after game, even while facing other ranked teams. The Eagles had only one subpar game during the first half of the season and entered the winter break with a stellar 12–3–1 record as well as the #1 spot in the PairWise rankings. The offense was being led by the top line of Ryan Leonard, Gabe Perreault and Andre Gasseau and, though they weren't leading the team to the otherworldly pace the Eagles had the previous year, BC was able to post solid offensive numbers. James Hagens boltered the team's second line but past them there was little depth scoring to be had. Injuries played no small par in this with the likes of Oskar Jellvik, Will Traeger and Timmy Delay missing significant chunks of the year. Compounding the matter was the lack of production from Dean Letourneau; BC was hoping to get more than 3 assists out of 1st-round draft pick. However, it was later revealed that Letourneauhad played the first half of the season with a broken hand and was never able to fully recover. Instead, the key to the team's record was the defense. The blueline had grown even more formidable with an extra year of experience while Fowler was a veritable wall in goal. The sophomore netminder consistently faced down some of the toughest teams in the nation and posted eye-popping numbers throughout the season. At year's end he received the Mike Richter Award as the nation's top goaltender for his performance.

With many of the team top players participating in the World Junior Championships, coach Brown made a point not to schedule games in late December or Early January so he team would not be affected by the absence of players. However, not playing in over a month did see the team flop upon their return with a loss to a down Merrimack squad. The team swiftly regained their focus and reeled off nine consecutive wins, five coming against top-10 teams, and jumped up to #1 in the polls. The winning streak came to an end in the Beanpot final against hated rival Boston University, which was an ill omen for the Eagles; none of the four participants had even won a national title without first winning the beanpot.

=== Postseason ===
Boston College was just as impressive in the second half of the season as they were in the first and finished the regular season with only 6 losses and sat #1 in all polls and rankings. Not only were the Eagles guaranteed a spot in the national tournament but they were mathematically assured to receive the #1 overall ranking and be placed in the Manchester Regional opposite the lowest-ranked tournament entry. Perhaps their enviable position gave the team a false sense of superiority because the team did not look like world-beaters once they hit the ice in the playoffs. Boston College's offense was largely ineffective against Northeastern and went more than 57 minutes without a goal. Instead, the Huskies were able to beat Fowler twice on just 19 shots. James Hagens finally got the team on the board with about two and a half minutes to play after their goaltender had been pulled but the Eagles were unable to find the equalizer. The shocking upset knocked BC out of the conference tournament and forced the team to sit and watch while the rest of the teams jockeyed for titles and tournament position.

Sure enough, once the NCAA field was set, BC was the #1 overall seed and they took a short journey north to face off against Bentley. Again, the team's offense struggled in the face of tight checking from their opponents and the Eagles were only able to find a single goal in the first 58 minutes of the game. The Falcons, though widely outmatched on paper, played a strong defensive game and relied heavily on a masterful performance by their goaltender to try an earn a seismic upset. While BC failed on all four of their power play chances, Bentley converted their to tie the game in the second and then waited patiently for their opportunity. It wasn't until the final few minutes of regulation that BC appeared to wake up and finally managed to get established in the offensive zone. After that it only took a few chances before James Hagens was able give BC their second lead with just 77 seconds left on the clock. Bentley pulled their goaltender in the faint hope of being able to tie the match once more but Leonard scored into the vacated goal for his 30th of the year and allowed the Eagles to escape.

Two days later, the Eagles met Denver in a rematch of the '24 national championship. While Boston College was hoping for revenge, they were once again stymied by the Pioneer netminder. BC fired 36 shots on goal but only a single marker from Teddy Stiga was able to slip into the goal. Fowler was far less busy in the match but Denver was able to make the most of their opportunities and score twice in the first half of the game. Come the third period, BC threw everything they had at the Denver cage but nothing got through. The Pioneers pulled back into a defensive shell, only managing a single shot on Fowler in the entire period. Even once Fowler was on the bench for an extra attacker, the Eagles could not break through. As time ticked away, Boston College became increasingly desperate and Denver was able to capitalize on a bad zone entry and fire the puck into the BC goal from their own end. The final goal came with just 4 seconds remaining and sealed the Eagles' fate.

== Departures ==
Player	Position	Nationality	Cause
Colby Ambrosio	Forward	Canada	Graduate transfer to Miami
Jamie Armstrong	Forward	United States	Graduation (signed with Charlotte Checkers)
Jacob Bengtsson	Defenseman	Sweden	Graduation (signed with Toronto Marlies)
Cutter Gauthier	Forward	United States	Signed professional contract (Anaheim Ducks)
Charlie Leddy	Defenseman	United States	Transferred to Quinnipiac
Jack Malone	Forward	United States	Graduation (signed with Utica Comets)
Will Smith	Forward	United States	Signed professional contract (San Jose Sharks)

== Recruiting ==
Player	Position	Nationality	Age	Notes
Brady Berard	Forward	United States	20	East Greenwich, RI; transfer from Providence
James Hagens	Forward	United States	17	Hauppauge, NY
Michael Hagens	Defenseman	United States	19	Hauppauge, NY
Dean Letourneau	Forward	Canada	18	Braeside, ON; selected 25th overall in 2024
Jake Sondreal	Forward	United States	20	Woodbury, MN
Will Skahan	Defenseman	United States	18	Orange, CA; selected 65th overall in 2024
Teddy Stiga	Forward	United States	18	Sudbury, MA; selected 55th overall in 2024

== Roster ==
As of September 7, 2024.

No.	Nat.	Player	Class	Pos	Height	Weight	DoB	Hometown	Previous team	NHL rights
1	(United States)	Jacob Fowler	Sophomore	G	6' 2" (1.88 m)	214 lb (97 kg)	2004-11-24	Melbourne, Florida	Youngstown Phantoms (USHL)	MTL, 69th overall 2023
2	(United States)	Eamon Powell (C)	Graduate	D	5' 11" (1.8 m)	173 lb (78 kg)	2002-05-10	Marcellus, New York	USNTDP (USHL)	TBL, 116th overall 2020
3	(United States)	Nolan Joyce	Sophomore	D	6' 1" (1.85 m)	192 lb (87 kg)	2003-09-25	Dedham, Massachusetts	Chicago Steel (USHL)	—
4	(United States)	Teddy Stiga	Freshman	F	5' 10" (1.78 m)	179 lb (81 kg)	2006-04-05	Sudbury, Massachusetts	USNTDP (USHL)	NSH, 55th overall 2024
5	(United States)	Drew Fortescue	Sophomore	D	6' 2" (1.88 m)	170 lb (77 kg)	2005-04-28	Pearl River, New York	USNTDP (USHL)	NYR, 90th overall 2023
7	(United States)	Aidan Hreschuk	Senior	D	5' 11" (1.8 m)	178 lb (81 kg)	2003-02-19	Long Beach, California	USNTDP (USHL)	CBJ, 94th overall 2021
8	(United States)	Lukas Gustafsson	Junior	D	5' 10" (1.78 m)	190 lb (86 kg)	2002-12-16	Atlanta, Georgia	Chicago Steel (USHL)	—
9	(United States)	Ryan Leonard (A)	Sophomore	F	6' 0" (1.83 m)	192 lb (87 kg)	2005-01-21	Amherst, Massachusetts	USNTDP (USHL)	WSH, 8th overall 2023
10	(United States)	James Hagens	Freshman	F	5' 10" (1.78 m)	172 lb (78 kg)	2006-11-03	Hauppauge, New York	USNTDP (USHL)	—
11	(United States)	Michael Hagens	Freshman	D	5' 11" (1.8 m)	170 lb (77 kg)	2002-08-07	Hauppauge, New York	Chicago Steel (USHL)	—
12	(United States)	Mike Posma (A)	Senior	F	6' 0" (1.83 m)	183 lb (83 kg)	2001-12-04	Pomona, New York	Omaha Lancers (USHL)	—
14	(United States)	Gentry Shamburger	Graduate	F	6' 0" (1.83 m)	196 lb (89 kg)	2000-09-29	Atlanta, Georgia	Avon Old Farms (USHS–CT)	—
15	(Sweden)	Oskar Jellvik	Sophomore	F	5' 11" (1.8 m)	180 lb (82 kg)	2003-02-08	Täby, Sweden	Djurgårdens J20 (J20 Nationell)	BOS, 149th overall 2021
17	(United States)	Aram Minnetian	Sophomore	D	5' 11" (1.8 m)	194 lb (88 kg)	2005-03-19	Woodcliff Lake, New Jersey	USNTDP (USHL)	DAL, 125th overall 2023
18	(United States)	Paul Davey	Junior	F	6' 2" (1.88 m)	195 lb (88 kg)	2003-01-11	Greenwich, Connecticut	Des Moines Buccaneers (USHL)	—
19	(United States)	Brady Berard	Junior	F	6' 1" (1.85 m)	198 lb (90 kg)	2004-02-26	East Greenwich, Rhode Island	Providence (HEA)	—
20	(Canada)	Dean Letourneau	Freshman	F	6' 7" (2.01 m)	214 lb (97 kg)	2006-02-21	Braeside, Ontario	St. Andrew's College (Midget AAA)	BOS, 25th overall 2024
22	(United States)	Will Vote	Sophomore	F	5' 8" (1.73 m)	161 lb (73 kg)	2005-02-22	Arlington, Massachusetts	USNTDP (USHL)	—
23	(United States)	Will Traeger	Junior	F	5' 8" (1.73 m)	172 lb (78 kg)	2002-04-10	Mendota Heights, Minnesota	New Jersey Hitmen (NCDC)	—
24	(United States)	Andre Gasseau	Junior	F	6' 4" (1.93 m)	215 lb (98 kg)	2003-07-03	Garden Grove, California	Fargo Force (USHL)	BOS, 213th overall 2021
25	(United States)	Jake Sondreal	Freshman	F	5' 11" (1.8 m)	163 lb (74 kg)	2004-02-19	Woodbury, Minnesota	Dubuque Fighting Saints (USHL)	—
26	(United States)	Will Skahan	Freshman	D	6' 4" (1.93 m)	216 lb (98 kg)	2006-05-14	Orange, California	USNTDP (USHL)	UTA, 65th overall 2024
27	(United States)	Connor Joyce (A)	Senior	F	6' 0" (1.83 m)	168 lb (76 kg)	2001-07-06	Dedham, Massachusetts	Connecticut Jr. Rangers (NCDC)	—
28	(United States)	Timmy Delay	Sophomore	F	6' 1" (1.85 m)	170 lb (77 kg)	2003-06-16	Hingham, Massachusetts	Chilliwack Chiefs (BCHL)	—
30	(Slovakia)	Jan Korec	Sophomore	G	6' 1" (1.85 m)	185 lb (84 kg)	2004-09-28	Bratislava, Slovakia	Des Moines Buccaneers (USHL)	—
31	(United States)	Alex Musielak	Sophomore	G	6' 4" (1.93 m)	183 lb (83 kg)	2003-07-23	Buffalo, New York	Kemptville 73's (CCHL)	—
34	(Canada)	Gabe Perreault	Sophomore	F	5' 11" (1.8 m)	165 lb (75 kg)	2005-05-07	Sherbrooke, Quebec	USNTDP (USHL)	NYR, 23rd overall 2023

== Standings ==
2024–25 Hockey East Standings
	Conference record										Overall record					
	GP	W	L	T	OTW	OTL	SW	PTS	GF	GA	GP	W	L	T	GF	GA
#4 Boston College †	24	18	4	2	2	0	1	55	82	40	37	27	8	2	125	65
#8 Maine *	24	13	5	6	1	1	5	50	67	45	38	24	8	6	124	75
#2 Boston University	24	14	8	2	1	1	2	46	89	65	40	24	14	2	150	119
#7 Connecticut	24	12	8	4	3	2	1	40	76	65	39	23	12	4	130	97
#13 Providence	24	11	8	5	2	2	1	39	65	67	37	21	11	5	103	96
#10 Massachusetts	24	10	9	5	0	0	2	37	69	58	40	21	14	5	133	97
Massachusetts Lowell	24	8	13	3	0	1	2	30	57	69	36	16	16	4	93	101
Merrimack	24	9	14	1	1	0	1	28	57	81	35	13	21	1	81	112
Northeastern	24	7	14	3	1	1	2	26	48	71	37	14	20	3	88	112
New Hampshire	24	5	14	5	0	2	1	23	53	73	35	13	16	6	96	100
Vermont	24	6	16	2	2	3	1	22	59	88	35	11	21	3	100	116
Championship: March 21, 2025 † indicates regular season champion * indicates conference tournament champion (Lamoriello Trophy); Rankings: USCHO Division I Men's Poll

== Schedule and results ==
Date	Time	Opponent^{#}	Rank^{#}	Site	TV	Decision	Result	Attendance	Record
Regular Season
October 11	6:00 pm	at #4 Michigan State*	#2	Munn Ice Arena • East Lansing, Michigan	BTN	Fowler	W 3–0	6,555	1–0–0
October 12	6:00 pm	at #4 Michigan State*	#2	Munn Ice Arena • East Lansing, Michigan		Fowler	L 3–4	6,555	1–1–0
October 18	7:00 pm	American International*	#2	Conte Forum • Chestnut Hill, Massachusetts	ESPN+	Fowler	W 5–0	7,224	2–1–0
October 19	7:00 pm	USNTDP*	#2	Conte Forum • Chestnut Hill, Massachusetts (Exhibition)	ESPN+		W 8–4		
October 26	7:00 pm	#14 Western Michigan*	#2	Conte Forum • Chestnut Hill, Massachusetts	ESPN+	Fowler	W 4–2	7,884	3–1–0
November 1	8:30 pm	at #10 St. Cloud State*	#2	Herb Brooks National Hockey Center • St. Cloud, Minnesota	Fox 9	Fowler	W 4–1	3,462	4–1–0
November 2	7:00 pm	at #10 St. Cloud State*	#2	Herb Brooks National Hockey Center • St. Cloud, Minnesota	Fox 9	Fowler	W 2–1	—	5–1–0
November 8	7:00 pm	#5 Maine	#2	Conte Forum • Chestnut Hill, Massachusetts	ESPN+, NESN	Fowler	W 3–2	7,884	6–1–0 (1–0–0)
November 10	1:00 pm	#5 Maine	#2	Conte Forum • Chestnut Hill, Massachusetts	ESPN+	Fowler	W 3–0	7,195	7–1–0 (2–0–0)
November 15	7:00 pm	at Connecticut	#2	Toscano Family Ice Forum • Storrs, Connecticut	ESPN+	Korec	L 4–5	2,691	7–2–0 (2–1–0)
November 19	7:00 pm	at #10 Providence	#3	Schneider Arena • Providence, Rhode Island	ESPN+	Korec	W 3–2 ^{OT}	3,015	8–2–0 (3–1–0)
November 22	7:00 pm	Northeastern	#3	Conte Forum • Chestnut Hill, Massachusetts	ESPN+	Fowler	W 3–0	7,884	9–2–0 (4–1–0)
November 23	7:00 pm	at Northeastern	#3	Matthews Arena • Boston, Massachusetts	ESPN+	Fowler	L 2–4	4,739	9–3–0 (4–2–0)
November 29	7:00 pm	#15 Dartmouth*	#4	Conte Forum • Chestnut Hill, Massachusetts	ESPN+	Fowler	W 5–3	7,395	10–3–0
December 4	7:00 pm	Connecticut	#3	Conte Forum • Chestnut Hill, Massachusetts	ESPN+	Fowler	W 2–1 ^{OT}	4,863	11–3–0 (5–2–0)
December 6	7:15 pm	at #14 Massachusetts Lowell	#3	Tsongas Center • Lowell, Massachusetts	ESPN+	Fowler	T 3–3 ^{SOL}	6,002	11–3–1 (5–2–1)
December 9	7:00 pm	#10т Massachusetts Lowell	#2	Conte Forum • Chestnut Hill, Massachusetts	ESPN+, NESN	Fowler	W 3–2	5,195	12–3–1 (6–2–1)
January 10	7:00 pm	Merrimack	#2	Conte Forum • Chestnut Hill, Massachusetts	ESPN+	Fowler	L 2–5	6,073	12–4–1 (6–3–1)
January 11	7:00 pm	at Merrimack	#2	J. Thom Lawler Rink • North Andover, Massachusetts	ESPN+	Fowler	W 1–4	2,764	13–4–1 (7–3–1)
January 14	7:00 pm	Harvard*	#2	Conte Forum • Chestnut Hill, Massachusetts	ESPN+	Fowler	W 3–1	7,186	14–4–1
January 17	7:00 pm	#6 Providence	#2	Conte Forum • Chestnut Hill, Massachusetts	ESPN+	Fowler	W 3–0	7,884	15–4–1 (8–3–1)
January 18	7:00 pm	at #6 Providence	#2	Schneider Arena • Providence, Rhode Island	ESPN+	Fowler	W 4–1	3,030	16–4–1 (9–3–1)
January 24	7:00 pm	at #8 Boston University	#1	Agganis Arena • Boston, Massachusetts (Rivalry)	ESPN+, NESN	Fowler	W 6–2	6,150	17–4–1 (10–3–1)
January 25	7:00 pm	#8 Boston University	#1	Conte Forum • Chestnut Hill, Massachusetts (Rivalry)	ESPN+, NESN	Fowler	W 2–0	7,884	18–4–1 (11–3–1)
January 31	7:00 pm	#8 Massachusetts Lowell	#1	Conte Forum • Chestnut Hill, Massachusetts	ESPN+	Korec	W 4–0	7,884	19–4–1 (12–3–1)
Beanpot
February 3	8:00 pm	vs. Northeastern*	#1	TD Garden • Boston, Massachusetts (Beanpot Semifinal)	NESN	Fowler	W 8–2	—	20–4–1
February 7	7:00 pm	at New Hampshire	#1	Whittemore Center • Durham, New Hampshire	ESPN+, NESN	Fowler	W 4–2	6,501	21–4–1 (13–3–1)
February 10	7:30 pm	vs. #9 Boston University*	#1	TD Garden • Boston, Massachusetts (Beanpot Championship, Rivalry)	NESN	Fowler	L 1–4	18,258	21–5–1
February 14	7:00 pm	#16 Massachusetts	#1	Conte Forum • Chestnut Hill, Massachusetts	ESPN+	Fowler	L 2–3	6,608	21–6–1 (13–4–1)
February 15	6:00 pm	at #16 Massachusetts	#1	Mullins Center • Amherst, Massachusetts	ESPN+	Fowler	W 4–1	7,606	22–6–1 (14–4–1)
February 21	7:00 pm	at Vermont	#2	Gutterson Fieldhouse • Burlington, Vermont	ESPN+	Fowler	W 6–3	3,687	23–6–1 (15–4–1)
February 22	7:30 pm	at Vermont	#2	Gutterson Fieldhouse • Burlington, Vermont	ESPN+	Fowler	W 4–1	3,566	24–6–1 (16–4–1)
February 28	7:00 pm	New Hampshire	#1	Conte Forum • Chestnut Hill, Massachusetts	ESPN+, NESN	Fowler	W 4–1	7,007	25–6–1 (17–4–1)
March 1	7:00 pm	at New Hampshire	#1	Whittemore Center • Durham, New Hampshire	ESPN+	Fowler	T 1–1 ^{SOW}	6,501	25–6–2 (17–4–2)
March 8	1:00 pm	Merrimack	#1	Conte Forum • Chestnut Hill, Massachusetts	ESPN+	Fowler	W 6–0	7,063	26–6–2 (18–4–2)
Hockey East Tournament
March 15	7:30 pm	Northeastern*	#1	Conte Forum • Chestnut Hill, Massachusetts (Hockey East Quarterfinal)	ESPN+, NESN+	Fowler	L 1–3	6,034	26–7–2
NCAA Tournament
March 28	2:00 pm	vs. #20 Bentley*	#2	SNHU Arena • Manchester, New Hampshire (Regional Semifinal)	ESPNU	Fowler	W 3–1	7,368	27–7–2
March 30	7:00 pm	vs. #6 Denver*	#2	SNHU Arena • Manchester, New Hampshire (Regional Final)	ESPN2	Fowler	L 1–3	6,802	27–8–2
*Non-conference game. ^{#}Rankings from USCHO.com Poll. All times are in Eastern Time. Source:

== NCAA tournament ==
=== Regional semifinal ===
March 28, 2025; 2:00 pm	(1) Boston College	3–1 (1–0, 0–1, 2–0)	(4) Bentley	SNHU Arena; Attendance: 7,368

Game reference

Jacob Fowler
Goalies
Connor Hasley
Referees:
Sterling Egan
Bruce Vida Jr.
Linesmen:
Patrick Giles
Nick Huff

(Leonard, J. Hagens) Gabe Perreault (16) – 16:45	1–0
	1–1	23:21 – PP – Ethan Leyh (17) (Castagna, Bochen)
(Minnetian, Fortescue) James Hagens (11) – GW – 58:43	2–1
(Hreschuk) Ryan Leonard (30) – EN – 59:28	3–1

6 min
Penalties
10 min
44
Shots
21

Game summary
The game started with BC being able to get the puck in deep while the Falcons could barely get over the blueline. While neither team was able to establish any real zone time, the Eagles were able to get several shots on Connor Hasley in the first few minutes. On one such exchange around the 4-minute mark, Hasley was unable to freeze the puck but got a lucky break when the ref lost sight of the puck and blew the whistle erroneously. Around the same time, Ryan Leonard ran into Hasley after being knocked down and the two forced the net off its moorings. On a later play, Hasley was able to push the net out of place with his leg, continuing an issue that the ice crew had been dealing with since before the start of the match. The game was paused for several minutes to give the maintenance team time to try and reset the pegs. On the ensuing play, Bentley appeared to commit two separate infractions, at least according to the BC faithful, but the referees disagreed. With the Eagles unable to buy a questionable call, Boston College started trying to push Bentley around after the whistle to see if they could goad one of the Falcons into making a mistake. While BC attempted to plant that seed, they persisted with the offensive pressure. The Eagles were able to tilt the ice towards the Falcons' end and set up in the offensive zone and besieged Hasley for several minutes in the middle of the period. A further potential Bentley penalty went uncalled by the referees who appeared to have decided to just let the two teams play. In spite of the lack of power plays, BC led in shots 10–0 halfway through the period. Bentley got a break when BC committed an icing call, giving the Falcons their first offensive zone draw of the game with 9 minutes to play. BC won the faceoff but then immediately iced the puck a second time. The second draw was a little closer but BC still managed to clear the zone. Moments later, the first penalty of the game was on Aidan Hreschuk for crosschecking. Many in the crowd were in disbelief with the borderline call after the earlier plays that had been let go. BC went on the attack during the disadvantage and was able to get a disjointed break on the Benley goal. After the Falcons regain possession they were able to set up their power play and get their first two shots of the match. While he had not seen any action to that point, Jacob Fowler was equal to the task. Once even strength play resumed, BC tried to get right back to their dominant play. Bentley, however, was able to built off their failed power play and finally break through the Boston College defense. Play evened out in the later part of the period but a bad turnover at the far blueline led to a rush up the ice by BC. Leonard found Gabe Perreault open down low and the winger moved around Hasley and slipped the puck into the net. Undaunted, Bentley went on the attack to try and get the goal back but they were unable to get a good shot on goal. With about a minute to play, the BC goal had trouble staying in position so the game was paused for a second time to fix the problem. When play resumed for a second time, BC's upped their offensive pressure. Hasley was forced to scramble but managed to keep the puck out until the horn sounded.

The second began with the two teams exchanging chances off the rush and, after a minute, the net behind Hasley was knocked from its mooring. On the ensuing play, BC was able to halt a Bentley rush but Lukas Gustafsson took a tripping minor in doing so. The Falcons had trouble setting up in the offensive zone but when they were finally able to do so, Ethan Leyh got two solid shots on goal, the second of which beat Fowler. After the ensuing faceoff, BC was able to finally draw it first power play with Jake Black grabbed James Hagens twice. The BC man-advantage was able to get several good looks at the goal but Bentley was able to block several shots while the rest either went wide or were stopped by Hasley. After Bentley iced the puck, the Falcon net was knocked out of place for the third time and the game paused once again to try and resolve the issue. After what was essentially an extra TV timeout, Bentley was able to clear the puck and relieve the pressure. Boston College remained in control for long stretches with occasional counters by Bentley. Near the middle of the period, Hasley bobbled a glove save but with no Eagle nearby the goaltender was able to smother the puck for a faceoff. By the midway point of the game it was apparent that Boston College was the better of the two and Bentley was only in the match thanks to a herculean defensive effort. Even, so, the game was tied and Nik Armstrong-Kingkade nearly gave the Falcons the lead when he hit the post on a solo rush. Just seconds later, the Falcons made a bad line change and were called for too many men. Boston College's second power play appeared to work to perfection and Perreault had a half-open cage but the puck was on edge and his shot went high and wide. Afterwards, the teams took matching minors that didn't change the makeup of the game but did take two of the top players off of the ice. When play resumed, the net behind Hasley was knocked off for the fourth time on the night and the problem was becoming as much of a story in the game as the players. The stoppage helped to kill off the rest of the BC power play as well as slow down the pace of play. The two teams carried the puck up and down the ice but neither was able to generate a good scoring chance for several minutes. With under 3 minutes to play, Bentley got on the attack but hit the post with another shot. The waning moments saw both team trying and failing to break through the defenses and the period ended with the two squads knotted at one.

Early in the third, Bentley was able to turn over the puck in the BC end and get themselves a couple of good looks at the net but strong play from the Eagle defense prevent either opportunity from reaching Fowler. Boston College countered and got a hard shot on goal that Hasley was unable to cover but the Falcons were first on the puck and able to clear it from danger. Further strong play from both the BC and Bentley defenses kept the puck out of the respective goals and both teams seemed dead set on doing everything they could to keep the other from scoring. Despite the emphasis in their own ends, the two teams were able to generate several scoring opportunities but neither could follow up after the initial shot. BC continued to press in spite of their failed attempts and eventually drew another power play when Armstrong-Kingkade was called for kneeing in the seventh minute. Bentley was able to kill off the first half of the man-advantage with relative ease but just as the power play was winging down, Arlo Merritt took a tripping penalty to extend BC's advantage. Perreault hit the outside of the post off of the ensuing faceoff and then Bentley was able to just disrupt the Eagles structure enough to force a turnover, then an offsides and finally an icing. The Falcons seemed to take heart at the mistakes made by Boston College and the defense remained locked in, continually blocking shots and passes to kill off the entire stretch of BC power play. Afterwards, Bentley began to play defense almost as if they had the lead but the result was that BC had great difficulty getting through on the rush. Even so, a bad turnover in the Falcons end gave James Hagens a glorious look at the goal but he delayed too long and by the time he shot the puck one of the Falcons was able to get his stick in the way and deflect the puck out of play. Boston College kept trying to set up passing plays and Bentley continued to get sticks and bodies in the way. With about 5 minutes to go, Bentley was able to get some pressure on Fowler but the BC netminder matched his counterpart by stopping the multi-shot attempt. With snow building up around the ice, BC committed consecutive icings near the end of the period but were able to clear the puck after each faceoff. With under two minutes to play, BC was finally able to follow up a rush and, after forcing a turnover, James Hagens was able to grab a loose puck behind the net and wrap it around for the go ahead goal. Bentley called a timeout to get themselves set for the final 77 seconds. BC got possession of the puck and forced Bentley to play in their end for several seconds. After the Falcons second attempt at zone entry, Hasley was pulled and, a moment later, Ryan Leonard netted an empty-net goal to salt away the game.

=== Regional final ===
March 30, 2025; 7:00 pm	(1) Boston College	1–3 (0–1, 1–1, 0–1)	(3) Denver	SNHU Arena; Attendance: 6,802

Game reference

Jacob Fowler
Goalies
Matt Davis
Referees:
Colin Kronforst
Jake Rekucki
Linesmen:
Jake Davis
Sam Shikowski

	0–1	18:19 – Eric Pohlkamp (11) (Devine, Thompson)
	0–2	22:59 – GW – James Reeder (11) (Buium, Salminen)
(Vote) Teddy Stiga (14) – 39:07	1–2
	1–3	59:56 – EN – Zeev Buium (13) (unassisted)

4 min
Penalties
2 min
36
Shots
25

Game summary

== Scoring statistics ==
Name	Position	Games	Goals	Assists	Points	PIM
Ryan Leonard	C	37	30	19	49	46
Gabe Perreault	RW	37	16	32	48	25
James Hagens	C/LW	37	11	26	37	24
Andre Gasseau	C/LW	36	15	15	30	49
Teddy Stiga	LW	36	14	16	30	34
Eamon Powell	D	32	4	16	20	12
Lukas Gustafsson	D	35	2	13	15	14
Aram Minnetian	D	35	2	13	15	16
Will Vote	RW	37	8	5	13	12
Oskar Jellvik	C/LW	23	4	9	13	12
Drew Fortescue	D	36	0	11	11	42
Mike Posma	C/LW	37	4	5	9	16
Aidan Hreschuk	D	33	2	7	9	21
Michael Hagens	D	37	1	7	8	5
Will Skahan	D	30	2	5	7	10
Jake Sondreal	C	36	2	4	6	36
Brady Berard	C	35	4	1	5	10
Connor Joyce	C	35	3	2	5	2
Dean Letourneau	C//RW	36	0	3	3	6
Jacob Fowler	G	35	0	2	2	17
Gentry Shamburger	F	21	1	0	1	10
Timmy Delay	RW	1	0	0	0	0
Jan Korec	G	3	0	0	0	0
Will Traeger	C	4	0	0	0	0
Nolan Joyce	D	17	0	0	0	4
Total			125	211	336	429

== Goaltending statistics ==
Name	Games	Minutes	Wins	Losses	Ties	Goals against	Saves	Shut outs	SV %	GAA
Jan Korec	3	156:41	2	1	0	3	62	1	.954	1.15
Jacob Fowler	35	2062:45	25	7	2	56	875	7	.940	1.63
Empty Net	-	16:19	-	-	-	6	-	-	-	-
Total	37	2235:45	27	8	2	65	937	8	.930	1.74

== Rankings ==
Poll	Week																											
Poll	Pre	1	2	3	4	5	6	7	8	9	10	11	12	13	14	15	16	17	18	19	20	21	22	23	24	25	26	27 (Final)
USCHO.com	2 (6)	2 (6)	2 (2)	2	2	2	2 (2)	3	4 (2)	3 (2)	2 (6)	2 (15)	–	2 (8)	2 (6)	2	1 (36)	1 (42)	1 (48)	1 (50)	2 (11)	1 (43)	1 (42)	1 (48)	2 (12)	2 (13)	–	4
USA Hockey	2 (4)	2 (6)	2	2	2	2	2	3	3 (1)	3	3 (1)	2 (11)	–	2 (6)	2 (7)	2	1 (24)	1 (27)	1 (33)	1 (34)	2 (13)	1 (33)	1 (34)	1 (34)	2 (10)	2 (13)	4	4

Note: USCHO did not release a poll in week 12 or 26.
Note: USA Hockey did not release a poll in week 12.

== Awards and honors ==
Player	Award	Ref
Jacob Fowler	Mike Richter Award	
Jacob Fowler	AHCA All-American East First Team	
Ryan Leonard	AHCA All-American East First Team	
Eamon Powell	AHCA All-American East Second Team	
Gabe Perreault	AHCA All-American East Second Team	
Ryan Leonard	Hockey East Player of the Year	
Eamon Powell	Hockey East Best Defensive Defenseman	
Jacob Fowler	Hockey East Goaltending Champion	
Ryan Leonard	Hockey East Three-Stars Award	
Ryan Leonard	Hockey East Scoring Champion	
Jacob Fowler	All-Hockey East First Team	
Eamon Powell	All-Hockey East First Team	
Ryan Leonard	All-Hockey East First Team	
Gabe Perreault	All-Hockey East First Team	
James Hagens	Hockey East All-Rookie Team	
Teddy Stiga	Hockey East All-Rookie Team	

== 2025 NHL entry draft ==
Round	Pick	Player	NHL team
1	7	James Hagens	Boston Bruins
2	51	William Moore ^{†}	Boston Bruins
2	63	Ben Kevan ^{†}	New Jersey Devils
3	65	Kieren Dervin ^{†}	Vancouver Canucks
4	101	Drew Schock ^{†}	Anaheim Ducks

† incoming freshman
