= Ben Barr =

American ice hockey player and coach

Current position
- Title: Head Coach
- Team: Maine
- Conference: Hockey East

Biographical details
- Born: December 16, 1981 (age 44); Faribault, Minnesota, U.S.
- Education: Rensselaer Polytechnic Institute

Playing career
- 1999–2000: Shattuck-Saint Mary's
- 2000–2004: Rensselaer
- Position: Forward

Coaching career (HC unless noted)
- 2004–2005: Rensselaer (volunteer asst.)
- 2005–2007: Capital District Selects
- 2007–2008: Rensselaer (volunteer asst.)
- 2008–2012: Union (assistant)
- 2012–2014: Providence (assistant)
- 2014–2016: Western Michigan (associate)
- 2016–2021: Massachusetts (associate)
- 2021–present: Maine

Head coaching record
- Overall: 69–58–17 (.538)
- Tournaments: 0–2 (.000)

Accomplishments and honors

Championships
- 2021 National Championship (asst.); 2025 Hockey East tournament champion

Benjamin Barr (born December 16, 1981) is the current head coach for Maine. Previously he was an assistant or associate head coach with five Division I programs and helped Massachusetts capture its first National Championship in 2021.

== Career ==
After attending Shattuck-Saint Mary's, a premier prep school for ice hockey in Minnesota, Barr began his college career with Rensselaer in the fall of 2000. Barr provided depth scoring in his first two seasons but saw a marked improvement as a junior. In 2003 he finished second on the Engineers in scoring and was named team MVP. He finished his playing career with a nearly equal point production in 2004 and retired following his graduation.

Barr began his coaching career the following year as a volunteer assistant for his alma mater. He got his first head coaching job in 2005 for the Capital District Selects, leading the club for two years before returning to Troy. In 2008 Barr got his first permanent position in college as an assistant for Union, the Engineers' long-time rival. Barr's arrival coincided with the Dutchmen's rise to prominence, going from 8th place in ECAC Hockey to 1st in just three years. In his final year with the team, Barr helped Union reach the Frozen Four.

=== Providence ===
In 2012 he rejoined Nate Leaman, who had hired him at Union, in Providence. He spent just two years with the program but both seasons saw the Friars post winning records, the first time the program had consecutive winning seasons since the early 1990s.

=== Western Michigan ===
In 2014, Barr left Leaman's shadow and became an associate head coach at Western Michigan. This time the positive results weren't forthcoming. The Broncos finished 7th out of 8 teams for two consecutive years in the NCHC and couldn't reach 10 wins in 2016.

=== UMass ===
Barr left the program and moved back east, taking an assistant position with Massachusetts under new head coach Greg Carvel. the Minutemen were recovering from a disappointing 4-year stretch under the previous bench boss and the abrupt change in scheme led to the program's worst record in 38 years. After the first year, however, the team took great strides and UMass won its first regular season title in 2019. The team reached the championship game that season but fell to defending champion Minnesota Duluth. Two years later, however, Barr's team got its revenge against the Bulldogs in the national semifinal and then went on to win the championship two nights later.

=== Maine ===
Shortly before Barr helped Massachusetts win the championship, Red Gendron, the head coach at Maine, died suddenly. The athletic department began a search for Gendron's replacement and, after a month of deliberation, hired Barr as the program's 5th head coach. Barr was noted as a strong recruiter when hired and announced his first three signees that July.

== Statistics ==
=== Regular season and playoffs ===
			Regular season					Playoffs
Season	Team	League	GP	G	A	Pts	PIM	GP	G	A	Pts	PIM
1999–00	Shattuck-Saint Mary's	US-Prep	—	—	—	—	—	—	—	—	—	—
2000–01	Rensselaer	ECAC Hockey	32	4	4	8	29	—	—	—	—	—
2001–02	Rensselaer	ECAC Hockey	29	2	5	7	10	—	—	—	—	—
2002–03	Rensselaer	ECAC Hockey	40	11	13	24	43	—	—	—	—	—
2000–01	Rensselaer	ECAC Hockey	39	8	17	25	34	—	—	—	—	—
NCAA totals			140	25	39	64	116	—	—	—	—	—

== Head coaching record ==
Record table
Season	Team	Overall	Conference	Standing	Postseason
Maine Black Bears (Hockey East) (2021–present)
2021–22	Maine	7–22–4	5–17–2	11th	Hockey East Opening Round
2022–23	Maine	15–16–5	9–11–4	T–6th	Hockey East Opening Round
2023–24	Maine	23–12–2	14–9–1	3rd	NCAA Northeast Regional Semifinal
2024–25	Maine	24–8–6	13–5–6	2nd	NCAA Allentown Regional Semifinal
Maine:		69–58–17	41–42–13		
Total:		69–58–17 (.538)			
National champion Postseason invitational champion Conference regular season champion Conference regular season and conference tournament champion Division regular season champion Division regular season and conference tournament champion Conference tournament champion
