= 2024–25 UMass Lowell River Hawks men's ice hockey season =

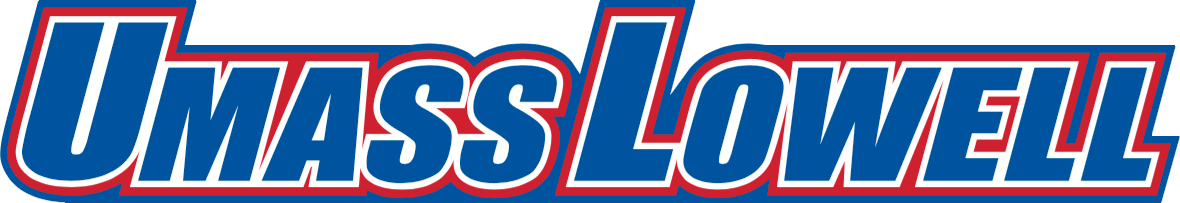

Adirondack Winter Invitational, Champion Coachella Valley Cactus Cup, Champion
- Conference: 7th Hockey East
- Home ice: Tsongas Center

Rankings
- USCHO: NR
- USA Hockey: NR

Record
- Overall: 16–16–4
- Conference: 8–13–3
- Home: 7–9–2
- Road: 6–7–1
- Neutral: 3–0–1

Coaches and captains
- Head coach: Norm Bazin
- Assistant coaches: Andy Boschetto; Eric Sorenson; Dylan Zink
- Captain(s): Pierson Brandon; Owen Cole; Ben Meehan

The 2024–25 UMass Lowell River Hawks Men's ice hockey season was the 58th season of play for the program, the 42nd at the Division I level and 41st in Hockey East. The River Hawks represented the University of Massachusetts Lowell in the 2024–25 NCAA Division I men's ice hockey season, played their home games at Tsongas Center and were coached by Norm Bazin in his 14th season.

== Season ==
Recovering from their worst season in nearly 15 years, Lowell began the season well with the offense providing a well-rounded attack over the first 6 weeks of the season. By Thanksgiving, the team was well established as a tournament hopeful with a 9–3 record which included a 6-game winning streak. The goaltending situation was a little shaky at times but Henry Welsch was able to keep his team on the right side of the ledger with the substantial goal support he was receiving. However, by the middle of November the team was looking for a better performance in goal and looked like they would receive it when they paired Welsch with junior transfer Béni Halász. The two netminders helped lead the team to a pair of in-season tournament championships during the holiday season even though the offense cooled off a bit.

By the time the River Hawks started the second half of their season, the team had risen up to 8th in the PairWise and was primed for a return to the national tournament. Unfortunately, Lowell had to run through a gauntlet of strong opponents with Hockey East having no less than 6 programs in position for tournament berths after the new year. The stiffer competition caused the Hawks' offense to collapse with the team only managing to score 31 goals over their final 15 games. Goaltending, too, suffered over the back half of the year but Massachusetts Lowell had little opportunity to win when they needed to hold the opponents to one or two goals. The River Hawks went 3–10–2 down the stretch, sliding down just far enough so that they were on the edge of the playoff bubble with a .500 record.

Despite the poor showing in the later part of the season, the Hawks still could earn their way into the tournament. Even without a conference championship, an appearance in the title game or, possibly, in the semifinal might allow Lowell to get just far enough ahead of the other teams clamoring for an at-large bid. They met one such team, New Hampshire in the opening round but got off to a poor start. The Hawks found themselves down by a goal after the first period but spent the remainder of the game throwing everything they could at the net. UMass Lowell outshot UNH 29–13 over the final 40 minutes but only managed to score a single goal. Fortunately, Welsch was able to close the door on the Wildcats and force the match into overtime. It took less than 4 minutes for Scout Truman to steal the puck from a UNH defender, skate into the left circle, and fire a shot into the far corner for the winning goal.

With their first hurdle surmounted, the team had to travel north to take on #5 Maine. The first period was fairly even, with neither side being able to register a goal. However, second period saw the team completely melt down. Just over a minute into the period, the Hawks took the first of four minor penalties in the second. About 3 minutes afterwards, while killing a second penalty, Truman was handed a game misconduct for contact to the head and gave Maine a 5-minute power-play. The Bears were only able to score once on the man-advantage despite the multiple opportunities but it turned momentum in favor of the Black Bears and the Hawks were unable to recover. Maine rang up four goals before Lowell was able to respond in the third, but by then it was too late. UML surrendered another three goals before their season ended, finishing with an embarrassing end to a once-promising season.

== Departures ==
Player	Position	Nationality	Cause
Gabe Blanchard	Defenseman	United States	Transferred to Sacred Heart
Ben Brunette	Defenseman	Canada	Transferred to Nipissing
Adam Cardona	Defenseman	Canada	Transferred to Alaska
Mark Cooper	Defenseman	Canada	Transferred to Toronto
Brehdan Engum	Defenseman	United States	Graduate transfer to Boston University
Filip Fornåå Svensson	Forward	Sweden	Graduation (signed with Fort Wayne Komets)
Owen Fowler	Forward	United States	Transferred to Maine
Nick Granowicz	Forward	United States	Graduation (signed with Savannah Ghost Pirates)
Jonathan Horn	Forward	United States	Transferred to Tufts
Shawn O'Donnell	Forward	United States	Transferred to Clarkson
Luke Pavicich	Goaltender	United States	Transferred to Arizona State
Alex Peterson	Forward	United States	Graduation (retired)
Nick Rhéaume	Forward	Canada	Transferred to Northeastern
Jake Stella	Forward	Sweden	Graduation (signed with Rapid City Rush)

== Recruiting ==
Player	Position	Nationality	Age	Notes
Nick Anderson	Defenseman	United States	25	Portsmouth, NH; graduate transfer from Colgate
Pierson Brandon	Defenseman	United States	24	New York, NY; graduate transfer from Colgate
Tate Brandon	Goaltender	United States	24	Irvington, NY; graduate transfer from Skidmore
Daniel Buchbinder	Defenseman	United States	20	Buffalo, NY
Mirko Buttazoni	Forward	Canada	20	Langley, BC
Ian Carpentier	Forward	United States	24	Worcester, MA; graduate transfer from Yale
Dylan Cook	Forward	United States	21	Princeton, MN
Chris Delaney	Forward	United States	20	Hopkinton, MA
Connor Eddy	Forward	Canada	22	Victoria, BC; transfer from Northern Michigan
Béni Halász	Goaltender	Hungary	23	Budapest, HUN; transfer from Northern Michigan
Jacob MacDonald	Forward	United States	20	Fort Worth, TX
Libor Nemec	Forward	Slovakia	21	Bardejov, SVK
Lee Parks	Forward	Canada	19	Stittsville, ON
Dominick Rivelli	Forward	United States	21	Highland Park, IL
Jack Robilotti	Defenseman	United States	23	New York, NY; graduate transfer from Holy Cross

== Roster ==
As of September 19, 2024.

No.	Nat.	Player	Class	Pos	Height	Weight	DoB	Hometown	Previous team	NHL rights
2	(United States)	Mitchell Becker	Junior	D	6' 3" (1.91 m)	220 lb (100 kg)	2001-05-24	Rogers, Minnesota	New Mexico Ice Wolves (NAHL)	—
3	(United States)	Jack Robilotti	Graduate	D	6' 3" (1.91 m)	195 lb (88 kg)	2001-07-18	New York, New York	Holy Cross (AHA)	—
4	(United States)	T. J. Schweighardt	Junior	D	5' 10" (1.78 m)	180 lb (82 kg)	2001-03-15	Wayne, New Jersey	Youngstown Phantoms (USHL)	—
5	(Canada)	Owen Cole (C)	Senior	F	5' 10" (1.78 m)	173 lb (78 kg)	2000-01-29	Dunnville, Ontario	Brooks Bandits (AJHL)	—
6	(United States)	Isac Jonsson	Senior	D	5' 10" (1.78 m)	173 lb (78 kg)	2000-10-08	Ängelholm, Sweden	Tri-City Storm (USHL)	—
7	(United States)	Daniel Buchbinder	Freshman	D	6' 3" (1.91 m)	190 lb (86 kg)	2004-07-07	Buffalo, New York	Penticton Vees (BCHL)	—
8	(United States)	Jaiden Moriello	Sophomore	F	6' 2" (1.88 m)	190 lb (86 kg)	2003-05-04	Saugus, Massachusetts	West Kelowna Warriors (BCHL)	—
9	(United States)	Jack Collins	Junior	F	6' 4" (1.93 m)	215 lb (98 kg)	2001-11-13	Canton, New York	Lone Star Brahmas (NAHL)	—
10	(United States)	Chris Delaney	Freshman	F	5' 6" (1.68 m)	146 lb (66 kg)	2004-09-25	Hopkinton, Massachusetts	Madison Capitols (USHL)	—
11	(United States)	Dominick Rivelli	Freshman	F	5' 10" (1.78 m)	176 lb (80 kg)	2003-08-01	Highland Park, Illinois	New Jersey Jr. Titans (NAHL)	—
12	(Canada)	Roc Truman	Junior	F	6' 0" (1.83 m)	195 lb (88 kg)	2001-04-25	Lethbridge, Alberta	Camrose Kodiaks (AJHL)	—
13	(Canada)	Connor Eddy	Junior	F	6' 1" (1.85 m)	200 lb (91 kg)	2002-04-18	Victoria, British Columbia	Northern Michigan (CCHA)	—
14	(United States)	Ben Meehan (C)	Graduate	D	6' 0" (1.83 m)	190 lb (86 kg)	2001-04-20	Walpole, Massachusetts	Cedar Rapids RoughRiders (USHL)	LAK, 140th overall 2020
15	(United States)	Dylan Cook	Freshman	F	6' 0" (1.83 m)	190 lb (86 kg)	2003-03-02	Princeton, Minnesota	Austin Bruins (NAHL)	—
16	(Latvia)	Ģirts Silkalns	Sophomore	F	6' 2" (1.88 m)	187 lb (85 kg)	2003-06-30	Talsi, Latvia	Fargo Force (USHL)	—
17	(Canada)	Mirko Buttazoni	Freshman	F	5' 10" (1.78 m)	190 lb (86 kg)	2004-09-12	Langley, British Columbia	Brooks Bandits (BCHL)	—
18	(United States)	Sean Kilcullen	Sophomore	D	6' 0" (1.83 m)	190 lb (86 kg)	2002-08-03	Kensington, Maryland	Maryland Black Bears (NAHL)	—
19	(United States)	Dillan Bentley	Junior	F	6' 4" (1.93 m)	190 lb (86 kg)	2001-03-31	Peoria, Illinois	New Mexico Ice Wolves (NAHL)	—
20	(Slovakia)	Libor Nemec	Freshman	F	6' 2" (1.88 m)	187 lb (85 kg)	2003-09-03	Bardejov, Slovakia	Green Bay Gamblers (USHL)	—
21	(United States)	Nick Anderson	Graduate	D	5' 10" (1.78 m)	165 lb (75 kg)	1999-01-04	Independence, Minnesota	Colgate (ECAC)	—
22	(United States)	Pierson Brandon (C)	Graduate	D	6' 0" (1.83 m)	180 lb (82 kg)	2000-06-26	Irvington, New York	Colgate (ECAC)	—
23	(Canada)	Lee Parks	Freshman	F	6' 2" (1.88 m)	218 lb (99 kg)	2004-10-16	Stittsville, Ontario	Fargo Force (USHL)	—
24	(Canada)	Scout Truman	Junior	F	5' 10" (1.78 m)	185 lb (84 kg)	2002-10-15	Lethbridge, Alberta	Des Moines Buccaneers (USHL)	—
25	(United States)	Matt Crasa	Senior	F	5' 11" (1.8 m)	185 lb (84 kg)	2001-03-04	South Setauket, New York	Fargo Force (USHL)	—
26	(United States)	Jacob MacDonald	Freshman	F	6' 2" (1.88 m)	190 lb (86 kg)	2004-09-23	Fort Worth, Texas	Lone Star Brahmas (NAHL)	—
27	(United States)	Stefan Owens	Senior	F	5' 10" (1.78 m)	169 lb (77 kg)	2000-04-24	Midlothian, Virginia	Maine Nordiques (NAHL)	—
28	(United States)	Ian Carpentier	Graduate	F	6' 0" (1.83 m)	185 lb (84 kg)	2000-06-22	Worcester, Massachusetts	Yale (ECAC)	—
29	(United States)	Jak Vaarwerk	Sophomore	F	6' 0" (1.83 m)	181 lb (82 kg)	2003-06-13	East Amherst, New York	Des Moines Buccaneers (USHL)	—
30	(Hungary)	Béni Halász	Junior	G	5' 11" (1.8 m)	184 lb (83 kg)	2001-08-13	Budapest, Hungary	Northern Michigan (CCHA)	—
31	(United States)	Tate Brandon	Graduate	G	5' 10" (1.78 m)	185 lb (84 kg)	2000-06-06	Irvington, New York	Skidmore (NEHC)	—
33	(United States)	Henry Welsch	Graduate	G	6' 2" (1.88 m)	195 lb (88 kg)	2000-11-17	Lakeville, Minnesota	Aberdeen Wings (NAHL)	—
39	(Sweden)	Edvard Nordlund	Senior	G	6' 2" (1.88 m)	176 lb (80 kg)	2001-07-12	Nacka, Sweden	Danbury Jr. Hat Tricks (NAHL)	—

== Standings ==
2024–25 Hockey East Standings
	Conference record										Overall record					
	GP	W	L	T	OTW	OTL	SW	PTS	GF	GA	GP	W	L	T	GF	GA
#4 Boston College †	24	18	4	2	2	0	1	55	82	40	37	27	8	2	125	65
#8 Maine *	24	13	5	6	1	1	5	50	67	45	38	24	8	6	124	75
#2 Boston University	24	14	8	2	1	1	2	46	89	65	40	24	14	2	150	119
#7 Connecticut	24	12	8	4	3	2	1	40	76	65	39	23	12	4	130	97
#13 Providence	24	11	8	5	2	2	1	39	65	67	37	21	11	5	103	96
#10 Massachusetts	24	10	9	5	0	0	2	37	69	58	40	21	14	5	133	97
Massachusetts Lowell	24	8	13	3	0	1	2	30	57	69	36	16	16	4	93	101
Merrimack	24	9	14	1	1	0	1	28	57	81	35	13	21	1	81	112
Northeastern	24	7	14	3	1	1	2	26	48	71	37	14	20	3	88	112
New Hampshire	24	5	14	5	0	2	1	23	53	73	35	13	16	6	96	100
Vermont	24	6	16	2	2	3	1	22	59	88	35	11	21	3	100	116
Championship: March 21, 2025 † indicates regular season champion * indicates conference tournament champion (Lamoriello Trophy); Rankings: USCHO Division I Men's Poll

== Schedule and results ==
Date	Time	Opponent^{#}	Rank^{#}	Site	TV	Decision	Result	Attendance	Record
Exhibition
October 6	4:00 pm	at Bentley*		Bentley Arena • Waltham, Massachusetts (Exhibition)	FloHockey		W 6–5		
Regular Season
October 11	7:15 pm	Minnesota Duluth*		Tsongas Center • Lowell, Massachusetts	ESPN+	Halász	L 2–4	6,241	0–1–0
October 12	6:05 pm	Minnesota Duluth*		Tsongas Center • Lowell, Massachusetts	ESPN+	Welsch	W 4–1	3,701	1–1–0
October 18	7:15 pm	Colgate*		Tsongas Center • Lowell, Massachusetts	ESPN+	Welsch	W 5–2	3,703	2–1–0
October 19	6:05 pm	Colgate*		Tsongas Center • Lowell, Massachusetts	ESPN+	Welsch	W 2–1	3,027	3–1–0
October 26	7:00 pm	at Merrimack		J. Thom Lawler Rink • North Andover, Massachusetts	ESPN+	Welsch	W 6–3	2,531	4–1–0 (1–0–0)
November 1	7:00 pm	at Holy Cross*	#20	Hart Center • Worcester, Massachusetts	FloHockey, NESN	Welsch	W 5–4 ^{OT}	1,002	5–1–0
November 8	7:00 pm	at #9 Boston University	#17	Agganis Arena • Boston, Massachusetts	ESPN+	Welsch	W 5–3	4,799	6–1–0 (2–0–0)
November 9	6:05 pm	#9 Boston University	#17	Tsongas Center • Lowell, Massachusetts	ESPN+	Welsch	L 2–5	6,259	6–2–0 (2–1–0)
November 15	7:00 pm	at Vermont	#15	Gutterson Fieldhouse • Burlington, Vermont	ESPN+	Welsch	W 5–2	2,145	7–2–0 (3–1–0)
November 16	6:00 pm	at Vermont	#15	Gutterson Fieldhouse • Burlington, Vermont	ESPN+	Welsch	W 3–0	2,667	8–2–0 (4–1–0)
November 22	7:15 pm	Connecticut	#15	Tsongas Center • Lowell, Massachusetts	ESPN+	Welsch	L 1–4	5,780	8–3–0 (4–2–0)
November 23	6:05 pm	Connecticut	#15	Tsongas Center • Lowell, Massachusetts	ESPN+	Halász	W 1–0	5,389	9–3–0 (5–2–0)
Adirondack Winter Invitational
November 29	4:00 pm	vs. St. Lawrence*	#16	Herb Brooks Arena • Lake Placid, New York (Winter Invitational Game 1)	ESPN+	Halász	W 2–1	2,407	10–3–0
November 30	7:30 pm	vs. #20 Clarkson*	#16	Herb Brooks Arena • Lake Placid, New York (Winter Invitational Game 2)	ESPN+	Welsch	T 4–4 ^{SOW}	2,237	10–3–1
December 6	7:15 pm	#3 Boston College	#14	Tsongas Center • Lowell, Massachusetts	ESPN+	Halász	T 3–3 ^{SOW}	6,002	10–3–2 (5–2–1)
December 9	7:00 pm	at #2 Boston College	#10т	Conte Forum • Chestnut Hill, Massachusetts	ESPN+, NESN	Halász	L 2–3	5,195	10–4–2 (5–3–1)
December 29	7:05 pm	Simon Fraser*	#10	Tsongas Center • Lowell, Massachusetts (Exhibition)	ESPN+	Welsch	W 9–2		
Coachella Valley Cactus Cup
January 3	6:30 pm	vs. Michigan Tech*	#10	Acrisure Arena • Thousand Palms, California (Cactus Cup Semifinal)		Welsch	W 3–2	—	11–4–2
January 4	10:00 pm	vs. Omaha*	#10	Acrisure Arena • Thousand Palms, California (Cactus Cup Championship)		Halász	W 3–2	—	12–4–2
January 10	7:15 pm	#7 Maine	#8	Tsongas Center • Lowell, Massachusetts	ESPN+	Welsch	L 1–3	5,462	12–5–2 (5–4–1)
January 11	6:05 pm	#7 Maine	#8	Tsongas Center • Lowell, Massachusetts	ESPN+, NESN	Halász	L 1–2	6,005	12–6–2 (5–5–1)
January 18	6:05 pm	Stonehill*	#9	Tsongas Center • Lowell, Massachusetts	ESPN+	Welsch	L 2–3 ^{OT}	4,308	12–7–2
January 24	7:15 pm	#7 Providence	#12	Tsongas Center • Lowell, Massachusetts	ESPN+	Halász	T 3–3 ^{SOW}	—	12–7–3 (5–5–2)
January 25	4:30 pm	at #7 Providence	#12	Schneider Arena • Providence, Rhode Island	ESPN+	Halász	W 1–0	2,967	13–7–3 (6–5–2)
January 31	7:00 pm	at #1 Boston College	#8	Conte Forum • Chestnut Hill, Massachusetts	ESPN+	Halász	L 0–4	7,884	13–8–3 (6–6–2)
February 1	6:05 pm	Merrimack	#8	Tsongas Center • Lowell, Massachusetts	ESPN+	Halász	W 3–2	6,006	14–8–3 (7–6–2)
February 7	7:15 pm	Vermont	#10	Tsongas Center • Lowell, Massachusetts	ESPN+	Halász	L 3–5	3,979	14–9–3 (7–7–2)
February 8	3:30 pm	at #11 Connecticut	#10	XL Center • Hartford, Connecticut	ESPN+	Halász	L 4–5 ^{OT}	5,558	14–10–3 (7–8–2)
February 14	7:00 pm	at Northeastern	#13	Matthews Arena • Boston, Massachusetts	ESPN+	Welsch	L 0–2	2,192	14–11–3 (7–9–2)
February 15	6:05 pm	Northeastern	#13	Tsongas Center • Lowell, Massachusetts	ESPN+	Welsch	W 3–1	5,305	15–11–3 (8–9–2)
February 22	6:00 pm	at #8 Providence	#13	Schneider Arena • Providence, Rhode Island	ESPN+	Welsch	L 2–4	2,545	15–12–3 (8–10–2)
February 27	7:00 pm	at #17 Massachusetts	#16	Mullins Center • Amherst, Massachusetts	ESPN+	Halász	T 2–2 ^{SOL}	3,845	15–12–4 (8–10–3)
March 1	6:05 pm	#17 Massachusetts	#16	Tsongas Center • Lowell, Massachusetts	ESPN+	Halász	L 3–5	6,552	15–13–4 (8–11–3)
March 7	7:15 pm	New Hampshire	#17	Tsongas Center • Lowell, Massachusetts	ESPN+, NESN+	Welsch	L 1–4	5,291	15–14–4 (8–12–3)
March 8	7:00 pm	at New Hampshire	#17	Whittemore Center • Durham, New Hampshire	ESPN+	Halász	L 2–4	6,501	15–15–4 (8–13–3)
Hockey East Tournament
March 12	7:05 pm	New Hampshire*	#19	Tsongas Center • Lowell, Massachusetts (Hockey East Opening Round)	ESPN+	Welsch	W 3–2 ^{OT}	2,995	16–15–4
March 15	6:00 pm	at #5 Maine*	#19	Alfond Arena • Orono, Maine (Hockey East Quarterfinal)	ESPN+	Welsch	L 1–7	5,043	16–16–4
*Non-conference game. ^{#}Rankings from USCHO.com Poll. All times are in Eastern Time. Source:

== Scoring statistics ==
Name	Position	Games	Goals	Assists	Points	PIM
Owen Cole	C	36	8	12	20	6
Mirko Buttazzoni	F	32	5	14	19	16
Scout Truman	LW	36	10	8	18	52
Chris Delaney	C	35	9	9	18	16
Ben Meehan	D	36	3	14	17	29
Dillan Bentley	F	34	9	7	16	16
Jak Vaarwerk	C	36	5	11	16	12
Lee Parks	RW	34	8	6	14	10
Matthew Crasa	C/RW	29	5	9	14	12
Nick Anderson	D	35	2	12	14	14
Libor Nemec	LW/RW	26	6	6	12	14
Isac Jonsson	D	35	2	10	12	4
Connor Eddy	C	36	5	5	10	32
T. J. Schweighardt	D	36	0	10	10	6
Ian Carpentier	C	27	2	7	9	8
Pierson Brandon	D	34	6	2	8	16
Jack Robilotti	D	36	2	4	6	32
Jacob MacDonald	C/LW	14	2	2	4	4
Ģirts Silkalns	F	10	1	2	3	2
Mitchell Becker	D	17	1	2	3	8
Stefan Owens	F	26	2	0	2	0
Daniel Buchbinder	D	15	0	1	1	4
Jack Collins	F	16	0	1	1	0
Jaiden Moriello	RW	2	0	0	0	0
Dominick Rivelli	RW	4	0	0	0	2
Sean Kilcullen	D	8	0	0	0	0
Béni Halász	G	18	0	0	0	0
Henry Welsch	G	20	0	1	1	0
Bench	–	–	–	–	–	16
Total			93	155	248	331

== Goaltending statistics ==
Name	Games	Minutes	Wins	Losses	Ties	Goals against	Saves	Shut outs	SV %	GAA
Béni Halász	18	1003:09	5	8	3	43	432	3	.909	2.57
Henry Welsch	20	1174:50	11	8	1	53	454	1	.895	2.71
Empty Net	-	13:12	-	-	-	5	-	-	-	-
Total	36	2191:11	16	16	4	101	886	4	.898	2.77

== Rankings ==
Poll	Week																											
Poll	Pre	1	2	3	4	5	6	7	8	9	10	11	12	13	14	15	16	17	18	19	20	21	22	23	24	25	26	27 (Final)
USCHO.com	RV	NR	NR	NR	20	17	15	15	16	14	10т	10	–	10	8	9	12	8	10	13	13	16	17	19	20	RV	–	RV
USA Hockey	RV	NR	NR	NR	19	16	15	13	16	13	10	9	–	10	8	9	13	8	9	13	13	15	17	19	20	RV	RV	RV

Note: USCHO did not release a poll in week 12 or 26.
Note: USA Hockey did not release a poll in week 12.
