= 2025 Hockey East men's tournament =

2025 Hockey East men's ice hockey tournament
- Dates: March 12–21, 2025
- Teams: 11
- Finals site: TD Garden; Boston, Massachusetts
- Champions: Maine (6th title)
- Winning coach: Ben Barr (1st title)
- MVP: Albin Boija (Maine)
- Hockey East men's Ice Hockey Tournaments

The 2025 Hockey East men's ice hockey tournament was the 40th tournament in the history of the conference. It was played between March 12 and March 21, 2025. As the tournament champions, Maine received the conference's automatic bid into the 2025 NCAA Division I men's ice hockey tournament. This was the first Hockey East title won by a school outside Massachusetts since 2004, also won by Maine.

== Format ==
The tournament includes all eleven teams in the conference, with teams ranked according to their finish in the conference standings. Seeds 1–5 earn a bye into the quarterfinal round, while seeds 6–11 play to determine the remaining quarterfinalists. Winners in the opening round are reseeded and advanced to play top three seeds in reverse order. Winners of the quarterfinal matches are again reseeded for the semifinal, and the winners of those two games face off in the championship.

All series are single-elimination with opening round and quarterfinal matches occurring at home team sites. The two semifinal games and championship match are held at the TD Garden. The tournament champion receives an automatic bid into the NCAA Division I men's ice hockey tournament.

== Standings ==
2024–25 Hockey East Standings
	Conference record										Overall record					
	GP	W	L	T	OTW	OTL	SW	PTS	GF	GA	GP	W	L	T	GF	GA
#4 Boston College †	24	18	4	2	2	0	1	55	82	40	37	27	8	2	125	65
#8 Maine *	24	13	5	6	1	1	5	50	67	45	38	24	8	6	124	75
#2 Boston University	24	14	8	2	1	1	2	46	89	65	40	24	14	2	150	119
#7 Connecticut	24	12	8	4	3	2	1	40	76	65	39	23	12	4	130	97
#13 Providence	24	11	8	5	2	2	1	39	65	67	37	21	11	5	103	96
#10 Massachusetts	24	10	9	5	0	0	2	37	69	58	40	21	14	5	133	97
Massachusetts Lowell	24	8	13	3	0	1	2	30	57	69	36	16	16	4	93	101
Merrimack	24	9	14	1	1	0	1	28	57	81	35	13	21	1	81	112
Northeastern	24	7	14	3	1	1	2	26	48	71	37	14	20	3	88	112
New Hampshire	24	5	14	5	0	2	1	23	53	73	35	13	16	6	96	100
Vermont	24	6	16	2	2	3	1	22	59	88	35	11	21	3	100	116
Championship: March 21, 2025 † indicates regular season champion * indicates conference tournament champion (Lamoriello Trophy); Rankings: USCHO Division I Men's Poll

== Bracket ==
Note: Teams are reseeded after the Opening Round and Quarterfinals)

Opening Round; March 12
6	Massachusetts	2
11	Vermont	1
7	Massachusetts Lowell	3*
10	New Hampshire	2
8	Merrimack	2
9	Northeastern	3**

Quarterfinals; March 14–15
1	Boston College	1
9	Northeastern	3
2	Maine	7
7	Massachusetts Lowell	1
3	Boston University	3
6	Massachusetts	2
4	Connecticut	3
5	Providence	1

Semifinals; March 20
2	Maine	4**
9	Northeastern	3
3	Boston University	2
4	Connecticut	5

Championship; March 21
2	Maine	5
4	Connecticut	2

Note: * denotes overtime period(s)

== Results ==
Note: All game times are local.

=== Opening Round: March 12, 2025 ===
==== (6) Massachusetts vs. (11) Vermont ====
Amherst, MA - Mullins Center - 7:00 PM - Attendance: 3,670

Scoring summary
Period	Team	Goal	Assist(s)	Time	Score
1st	MASS	Lucas Mercuri	O'Hara, Musa	12:16	1–0 MASS
1st	MASS	Ryan Lautenbach - GWG	Unassisted	13:30	2–0 MASS
1st	UVM	Colin Kessler	Wismer, Strand	14:39	2-1 MASS
2nd	None				
3rd	None				

Goaltenders
Team	Name	Saves	Goals against	Time on ice
MASS	Michael Hrabal	24	1	
UVM	Keenan Rancier	19	2	

==== (7) Massachusetts Lowell vs. (10) New Hampshire ====
Lowell, MA - Tsongas Center - 7:00 PM - Attendance: 2,995

Scoring summary
Period	Team	Goal	Assist(s)	Time	Score
1st	UML	Chris Delaney	Buttazoni, Meehan	09:33	1–0 UML
1st	UNH	Colton Huard	Reid, Winters	10:58	1–1
1st	UNH	Robert Cronin - PPG	Conmy, LeClerc	12:27	2-1 UNH
2nd	UML	Matt Crasa	Robilotti, Schweighardt	31:23	2-2
3rd	None				
OT	UML	Scout Truman - GWG	Unassisted	63:38	3-2 UML

Goaltenders
Team	Name	Saves	Goals against	Time on ice
UNH	Rico DiMatteo	39	3	
UML	Henry Welsch	22	2	

==== (8) Merrimack vs. (9) Northeastern ====
North Andover, MA - Lawler Rink - 7:00 PM - Attendance: 1,987

Scoring summary
Period	Team	Goal	Assist(s)	Time	Score
1st	None				
2nd	NU	Christophe Tellier	Lund, Williams	26:20	1–0 NU
2nd	MC	Seamus Powell	Daneault, Fitzpatrick	27:21	1–1
2nd	MC	Caelan Fitzpatrick	Enns, Mysak	35:44	2-1 MC
3rd	NU	Jack Williams	Hryckowian, Lund	44:39	2-2
OT	None				
2OT	NU	Dylan Hryckowian - GWG	Dorrington, Messuri	84:39	3-2 NU

Goaltenders
Team	Name	Saves	Goals against	Time on ice
MC	Max Lundgren	38	3	
NU	Cameron Whitehead	44	2	

=== Quarterfinals: March 14–15, 2025 ===
==== (1) Boston College vs (9) Northeastern ====
Chestnut Hill, MA - Conte Forum - 7:30 PM - Attendance: 6,034

Scoring summary
Period	Team	Goal	Assist(s)	Time	Score
1st	None				
2nd	NU	Cam Lund	Williams, Higgins	34:11	1-0 NU
2nd	NU	Joe Connor - GWG	Tellier, McGuire	36:20	2-0 NU
3rd	BC	James Hagens	Perreault, Leonard	57:26	2-1 NU
3rd	NU	Ryan McGuire - ENG	Unassisted	59:58	3-1 NU

Goaltenders
Team	Name	Saves	Goals against	Time on ice
BC	Jacob Fowler	17	2	
NU	Cameron Whitehead	30	1	

==== (2) Maine vs (7) Massachusetts-Lowell ====
Orono, ME - Alfond Arena - 6:00 PM - Attendance: 5,043

Scoring summary
Period	Team	Goal	Assist(s)	Time	Score
1st	None				
2nd	MAINE	Sully Scholle - PPG	Djurasevic, Nadeau	27:13	1–0 MAINE
2nd	MAINE	Frank Djurasevic - GWG	Scholle, Makar	28:59	2-0 MAINE
2nd	MAINE	Lynden Breen	Russell, Nobes	35:31	3-0 MAINE
3rd	MAINE	Thomas Freel	Breazeale, Pichette	41:39	4-0 MAINE
3rd	UML	Nick Anderson	Bentley, Collins	47:56	4-1 MAINE
3rd	MAINE	Harrison Scott	Freel, Breazeale	54:26	5-1 MAINE
3rd	MAINE	Josh Nadeau	Nobes, Fowler	57:15	6-1 MAINE
3rd	MAINE	Ross Mitton	Pichette, Fowler	58:20	7-1 MAINE

Goaltenders
Team	Name	Saves	Goals against	Time on ice
MAINE	Albin Boija	27	1	
UML	Henry Welsch	35	7	

==== (3) Boston University vs (6) Massachusetts ====
Boston, MA - Agganis Arena - 4:30 PM - Attendance: 5,563

Scoring summary
Period	Team	Goal	Assist(s)	Time	Score
1st	BU	Shane Lachance - PPG	Eiserman, Greene	5:14	1–0 BU
2nd	MASS	Jack Musa	O'Hara, Keenan	23:32	1–1
2nd	BU	Sascha Boumedienne	Hughes, Willander	31:26	2-1 BU
3rd	MASS	Aydar Suniev	Locmelis, Lautenbach	51:17	2-2
OT	BU	Cole Eiserman - GWG	Boumedienne	62:59	3-2 BU

Goaltenders
Team	Name	Saves	Goals against	Time on ice
BU	Mikhail Yegorov	36	2	
MASS	Michael Hrabal	26	3	

==== (4) Connecticut vs. (5) Providence ====
Storrs, CT - Toscano Family Ice Forum - 7:00 PM - Attendance: 2,691

Scoring summary
Period	Team	Goal	Assist(s)	Time	Score
1st	PC	Guillaume Richard - SHG	Gamache	03:44	1–0 PC
2nd	CONN	Hudson Schandor	Richard, Muldowney	36:35	1–1
3rd	CONN	Joey Muldowney - GWG	Richard, Tattle	40:20	2-1 CONN
3rd	CONN	Joey Muldowney - ENG	Messineo, Muszelik	59:13	3-1 CONN

Goaltenders
Team	Name	Saves	Goals against	Time on ice
CONN	Tyler Muszelik	32	1	
PC	Philip Svedebäck	26	2	

=== Semifinals: March 20, 2025 ===
==== (3) Boston University vs (4) Connecticut ====
Boston, MA - TD Garden - 4:00 PM - Attendance: 14,313 (combined with NU-ME)

Scoring summary
Period	Team	Goal	Assist(s)	Time	Score
1st	BU	Quinn Hutson - PPG	C. Hutson	09:32	1–0 BU
2nd	CONN	Tristan Fraser	Heaslip	20:59	1–1
2nd	CONN	Ryan Tattle	Richard	22:56	2-1 CONN
2nd	CONN	Joey Muldowney - GWG	Carabin, Richard	28:42	3-1 CONN
3rd	CONN	Joey Muldowney	Richard, Tattle	45:04	4-1 CONN
3rd	CONN	Joey Muldowney - ENG	Richard, Messineo	56:12	5-1 CONN
3rd	BU	Kamil Bednarik	Celebrini, Eiserman	59:50	5-2 CONN

Goaltenders
Team	Name	Saves	Goals against	Time on ice
CONN	Callum Tung	25	2	
BU	Mikhail Yegorov	19	4	

==== (2) Maine vs (9) Northeastern - 7:30 PM ====
Boston, MA - TD Garden - 7:35 PM - Attendance: 14,313 (combined with CT-BU)

Scoring summary
Period	Team	Goal	Assist(s)	Time	Score
1st	MAINE	Owen Fowler	Scott	14:02	1–0 MAINE
2nd	MAINE	Owen Fowler	Breen	22:03	2-0 MAINE
2nd	NU	Dylan Hryckowian - PPG	Connor, Lund	24:01	2-1 MAINE
2nd	NU	Cam Lund	Dorrington	39:11	2-2
3rd	NU	Andy Moore	Rheaume, Borgesi	44:29	3-2 NU
3rd	MAINE	Luke Antonacci	Scott	52:44	3-3
OT	None				
2OT	MAINE	Nolan Renwick - GWG	Russell, Djurasevic	91:02	4-3 MAINE

Goaltenders
Team	Name	Saves	Goals against	Time on ice
MAINE	Albin Boija	33	3	
NU	Cameron Whitehead	57	4	

=== Championship: March 21, 2025 ===
==== (2) Maine vs (4) Connecticut ====
Boston, MA - TD Garden - 7:30 PM - Attendance: 17,605

Scoring summary
Period	Team	Goal	Assist(s)	Time	Score
1st	MAINE	Lynden Breen	Nadeau	12:47	1–0 MAINE
1st	MAINE	Josh Nadeau - PPG	Boija	16:29	2–0 MAINE
2nd	MAINE	Harrison Scott - GWG	Breazeale	36:37	3-0 MAINE
3rd	CONN	Tabor Heaslip	Shahan, Carabin	43:11	3-1 MAINE
3rd	MAINE	Taylor Makar	Renwick, Breazeale	49:21	4-1 MAINE
3rd	CONN	Tabor Heaslip	Percival	54:41	4-2 MAINE
3rd	MAINE	Taylor Makar - ENG	Russell, Renwick	58:35	5-2 MAINE

Goaltenders
Team	Name	Saves	Goals against	Time on ice
MAINE	Albin Boija	27	2	
CONN	Tyler Muszelik	19	4	

== Tournament Awards ==
=== All-Tournament Team ===
- G – Albin Boija* (Maine)
- D – Luke Antonacci (Maine)
- D – David Breazeale (Maine)
- F – Joey Muldowney (Connecticut)
- F – Owen Fowler (Maine)
- F – Harrison Scott (Maine)

* Tournament MVP
