= Albin Boija =

American ice hockey player (born 2003)

- Born: 20 August 2003 (age 22) Sundsvall, Sweden
- Height: 6 ft 1 in (185 cm)
- Weight: 195 lb (88 kg; 13 st 13 lb)
- Position: Goaltender
- Catches: Left
- NCAA team: University of Maine

Albin Boija (born 20 August 2003) is a Swedish college ice hockey goaltender for the University of Maine of the National Collegiate Athletic Association (NCAA).

== Playing career ==
=== College ===
Boija began his college ice hockey career during the 2023–24 season. During his freshman year he appeared in 18 games, with 16 start, and posted a 10–6–1 record, with a 2.01 goals against average (GAA) and a .916 save percentage. His missed the 2024 NCAA Division I men's ice hockey tournament due to illness.

During the 2024–25 season, in his sophomore year, he appeared in 37 games and posted a 23–8–6 record, with a 1.82 GAA and a .928 save percentage. He ranked fifth overall in the NCAA in GAA, and wins, and fourth in shutouts (4). His 1.82 GAA ranks second all-time in single-season program history, trailing only Jimmy Howard's record 1.19 GAA set during the 2003–04 season. During the championship game of the 2025 Hockey East men's ice hockey tournament against UConn, he made 27 saves and helped Maine win the Hockey East tournament for the first time since 2004. He was subsequently named to the All-Tournament team and William Flynn Tournament Most Valuable Player. Following the season he was named to the All-Hockey East Second Team, an AHCA East Second Team All-American, and a top-four finalist for the Mike Richter Award.

On 9 April 2025, he announced he would return to Maine during the 2025–26 season, after receiving professional offers.

== Career statistics ==
			Regular season									Playoffs
Season	Team	League	GP	W	L	OTL	MIN	GA	SO	GAA	SV%	GP	W	L	MIN	GA	SO	GAA	SV%
2023–24	University of Maine	Hockey East	18	10	6	1	1,014	34	2	2.01	.916	—	—	—	—	—	—	—	—
2024–25	University of Maine	Hockey East	37	23	8	6	2,269	69	4	1.82	.928	—	—	—	—	—	—	—	—
NCAA totals			55	33	14	7	3,284	103	6	1.88	.924	—	—	—	—	—	—	—	—

== Awards and honours ==
Award	Year
College
All-Hockey East Second Team	2025
Hockey East All-Tournament Team	2025
William Flynn Tournament Most Valuable Player	2025
AHCA East Second Team All-American	2025

Awards and achievements
Preceded by Will Smith	Hockey East Tournament MVP; 2025	Succeeded by Incumbent
