= Viking Gustafsson Nyberg =

Swedish professional ice hockey player

- Born: 21 September 2003 (age 23) Stockholm, Sweden
- Height: 6 ft 7 in (201 cm)
- Weight: 225 lb (102 kg; 16 st 1 lb)
- Position: Defense
- Shoots: Left
- NHL team (P) Cur. team: Minnesota Wild; Iowa Wild (AHL)
- NHL draft: Undrafted
- Playing career: 2026–present

Viking Gustafsson Nyberg (born 21 September 2003) is a Swedish professional ice hockey player who is a defenseman for the Iowa Wild in the American Hockey League (AHL) while under contract to the Minnesota Wild of the National Hockey League (NHL).

== Playing career ==
Gustafsson Nyberg, a defenceman, played for the U16 team of Värmdö HC, scoring six points in 11 games, during the 2017–18 season. He then continued his career with Nacka HK and later with Leksands IF. At Nacka, Gustafsson Nyberg progressed from the U16 team in 2018–19 to the U18 and U20 teams in 2019–20. This was followed by a move to Leksands in 2021, where Gustafsson Nyberg posted a goal and 13 assists in 40 games for the U20 team in his first year. He served as alternate captain for the club's U20 squad in 2022–23, scoring six goals and 17 assists in 42 games.

While playing in Sweden, Gustafsson Nyberg was scouted by Nick Peruzzi, an assistant coach for the Wildcats of Northern Michigan University, who recruited him to play in the U.S. He posted three points as a freshman in 2023–24 before transferring to the UConn Huskies, where Peruzzi had become associate coach. As he lacked a scholarship at UConn, a teammate, Hudson Schandor, gave up his own for him. In his first year with UConn, he totaled a goal, 10 assists, and 62 blocked shots while appearing in all 39 games. Gustafsson Nyberg then had 11 assists in 38 games during the 2025–26 season while serving as alternate captain, as the team reached the NCAA Tournament and won their second straight Hockey East title.

After UConn's season, Gustafsson Nyberg signed with the Iowa Wild of the American Hockey League (AHL) on 6 April 2026, on an amateur tryout (ATO). After two games with Iowa, in which he recorded an assist, he signed a two-year, entry-level contract with the Minnesota Wild of the National Hockey League (NHL) on 9 April. Gustafsson Nyberg made his NHL debut four days later in a 6–3 loss to the St. Louis Blues, leading the team with nearly 22 minutes of ice time. He appeared in one further game for Minnesota during the 2025–26 NHL season, recording no points.

== Personal life ==
Gustafsson Nyberg was born on 21 September 2003, in Stockholm, Sweden. He grew up in Värmdö and Nacka. He played ice hockey from a young age, after his father "fitt[ed] him with skates as a toddler and put him on the ice to figure things out".

== Career statistics ==
			Regular season					Playoffs
Season	Team	League	GP	G	A	Pts	PIM	GP	G	A	Pts	PIM
2021–22	Leksands IF	J20	40	1	13	14	12	2	0	0	0	0
2022–23	Leksands IF	J20	42	6	17	23	16	7	1	3	4	6
2023–24	Northern Michigan University	CCHA	33	2	1	3	24	—	—	—	—	—
2024–25	University of Connecticut	HE	39	1	10	11	27	—	—	—	—	—
2025–26	University of Connecticut	HE	38	0	11	11	26	—	—	—	—	—
2025–26	Iowa Wild	AHL	2	0	1	1	2	—	—	—	—	—
2025–26	Minnesota Wild	NHL	2	0	0	0	0	—	—	—	—	—
NHL totals			2	0	0	0	0	—	—	—	—	—
