= Taylor Makar =

Canadian ice hockey player (born 2001)

- Born: March 13, 2001 (age 25) Calgary, Alberta, Canada
- Height: 6 ft 4 in (193 cm)
- Weight: 202 lb (92 kg; 14 st 6 lb)
- Position: Forward
- Shoots: Left
- NHL team (P) Cur. team: Colorado Avalanche; Colorado Eagles (AHL)
- NHL draft: 220th overall, 2021; Colorado Avalanche
- Playing career: 2025–present

Taylor Makar (born March 13, 2001) is a Canadian professional ice hockey player who is a forward for the Colorado Eagles of the American Hockey League (AHL) while under contract to the Colorado Avalanche of the National Hockey League (NHL).

He is the younger brother of Cale Makar, who also plays for Colorado.

== Playing career ==
On March 31, 2025, Makar signed a one-year, entry-level contract with the Avalanche. Following the signing, he reported to their American Hockey League (AHL) affiliate, the Colorado Eagles, on an amateur tryout.

Makar entered the 2025–26 season participating in the Avalanche's training camp. He was cut from the roster during the training camp and assigned to the Eagles. On October 31, Makar was called up to the Avalanche after Gavin Brindley was knocked out of the lineup due to an injury. He made his debut a day later against the San Jose Sharks, where he recorded one hit and 6:07 in ice time before being sent down to the Eagles the same day. With his debut, it was the first time in Avalanche history that two brothers played together.

== Career statistics ==
			Regular season					Playoffs
Season	Team	League	GP	G	A	Pts	PIM	GP	G	A	Pts	PIM
2017–18	Brooks Bandits	AJHL	3	0	1	1	0	—	—	—	—	—
2018–19	Brooks Bandits	AJHL	43	4	13	17	63	—	—	—	—	—
2019–20	Brooks Bandits	AJHL	42	8	16	24	59	—	—	—	—	—
2020–21	Brooks Bandits	AJHL	16	5	14	19	75	—	—	—	—	—
2021–22	UMass-Amherst	HE	17	1	0	1	12	—	—	—	—	—
2022–23	UMass-Amherst	HE	32	10	2	12	54	—	—	—	—	—
2023–24	UMass-Amherst	HE	36	4	5	9	22	—	—	—	—	—
2024–25	University of Maine	HE	38	18	12	30	47	—	—	—	—	—
2024–25	Colorado Eagles	AHL	5	1	0	1	2	1	0	0	0	0
2025–26	Colorado Eagles	AHL	52	14	10	24	56	17	2	4	6	24
2025–26	Colorado Avalanche	NHL	12	0	0	0	4	—	—	—	—	—
NHL totals			12	0	0	0	4	—	—	—	—	—
