= Joey Muldowney =

American ice hockey player (born 2004)

- Born: June 5, 2004 (age 22) Lake View, New York, U.S.
- Height: 5 ft 9 in (175 cm)
- Weight: 160 lb (73 kg; 11 st 6 lb)
- Position: Right wing
- Shoots: Right
- NCAA team: University of Connecticut
- NHL draft: 172nd overall, 2022; San Jose Sharks

Joey Muldowney (born June 5, 2004) is an American college ice hockey player for the University of Connecticut of the National Collegiate Athletic Association (NCAA).

== Playing career ==
=== Junior ===
Muldowney launched his hockey career with the Des Moines Buccaneers in the United States Hockey League (USHL), where he posted 16 goals and 15 assists over 64 games. He was selected by the San Jose Sharks in the sixth round, 172nd overall, of the 2022 NHL entry draft on July 8, 2022.

=== College ===
On November 9, 2021, Muldowney announced his commitment to play college ice hockey at the University of Connecticut. In his freshman campaign during the 2023–24 season, he tallied five goals and nine assists across 35 games.

In the 2024–25 season, during his sophomore year, Muldowney emerged as the team’s top scorer, registering 29 goals and 18 assists over 39 games. His performance set new single-season program records in goals (29), points (47), and hat-tricks (3) during the Hockey East era. On January 17, 2025, he notched a career-best four goals in a 4–2 upset win over Maine. Later, on March 20, 2025, in the semifinals of the 2025 Hockey East tournament against Boston University, he recorded his third career hat-trick, propelling Connecticut to the championship game for just the second time in school history. For his outstanding season, Muldowney was named to both the All-Hockey East Second Team and the AHCA East Second Team All-American, becoming only the third player in the program's NCAA Division I history to receive All-American honors.

== Career statistics ==
			Regular season					Playoffs
Season	Team	League	GP	G	A	Pts	PIM	GP	G	A	Pts	PIM
2021–22	Des Moines Buccaneers	USHL	3	1	1	2	2	—	—	—	—	—
2022–23	Des Moines Buccaneers	USHL	61	15	14	29	37	2	1	3	4	0
2023–24	University of Connecticut	HE	35	5	9	14	12	—	—	—	—	—
2024–25	University of Connecticut	HE	39	29	18	47	12	—	—	—	—	—
2025-26	University of Connecticut	HE	34	17	12	29	25	—	—	—	—	—
NCAA totals			108	51	45	96	49	—	—	—	—	—

== Awards and honors ==
Award	Year
College
All-Hockey East Second Team	2025, 2026
AHCA East Second Team All-American	2025
