= 2024–25 Northeastern Huskies men's ice hockey season =

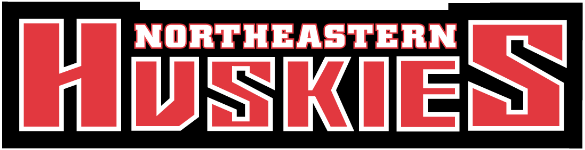
- Conference: 9th Hockey East
- Home ice: Matthews Arena

Rankings
- USCHO: NR
- USA Hockey: NR

Record
- Overall: 14–20–3
- Conference: 7–14–3
- Home: 5–8–2
- Road: 8–8–1
- Neutral: 1–4–0

Coaches and captains
- Head coach: Jerry Keefe
- Assistant coaches: Mike Levine; Jason Guerriero; Brian Mahoney-Wilson
- Captain: Jack Williams
- Alternate captain(s): Jake Boltmann; Vinny Borgesi; Jackson Dorrington; Cameron Lund

The 2024–25 Northeastern Huskies Men's ice hockey season was the 93rd season of play for the program and 41st in Hockey East. The Huskies represented Northeastern University in the 2024–25 NCAA Division I men's ice hockey season, played their home games at Matthews Arena and were coached by Jerry Keefe in his 4th season.

== Season ==
Northeastern began its season by having to run through a gauntlet of some of the best teams in the country. After opening with a relatively easy win over Stonehill, the Huskies played eight of their next ten games against clubs that would eventually make the NCAA tournament. Northeastern was unable to cope with that high level of competition and went over a month before they could earn their second victory of the year. During the stretch Cameron Whitehead was bombarded by shots but still managed to post respectable numbers. His play in goal gave the team several chances to win but the offense could not respond. In their 9-game winless streak the Huskies scored more than 2 goal on just one occasion even though they were able to generate a good amount of shots.

The team began showing some signs of life come December. The top line of Jack Williams, Cameron Lund and Dylan Hryckowian, who had started the season by scoring virtually every goal in October, recovered their form. With their leading men scoring again, albeit inconsistently, Northeastern was able to win several games. The team nearly climbed back to a .500 record by late January when Whitehead went through a rough patch. Three consecutive losses were capped off by a debacle where he allowed 8 goals on 31 shots to Boston College. Afterwards, freshman Quentin Sigurdson was given a turn in goal so Whitehead could have a bit of a breather before returning to his starting role. Unfortunately, over the final month of the season the team's scoring declined once more and the club won just 3 of its final 12 games.

Come playoff time, Northeastern was wallowing near the bottom of the standings and had done so poorly in conference play that they would have to start the Hockey East playoffs on the road. Perhaps the only saving grace for their opening match was that Merrimack had only been marginally better over the course of the season so the Huskies at last weren't facing one of the several conference teams that had already punched their ticket to the NCAA tournament. The Huskies opened the scoring early in the second but found themselves behind by the end of the period. Williams managed to tie the score in the third while Whitehead had to stand tall in goal and turn aside every shot in the final frame to force overtime. Once more, the junior netminder blanked Merrimack, keeping the two sides even through four periods in one of his best performances of the season. The Warriors began to tire in the second OT and Northeastern upped the pressure. Hryckowian's one-timer found the back of the net sending the Huskies to the quarterfinals.

For their next match, Northeastern had to fight through the #1 team in the nation, Boston College. Whitehead redeemed himself in the game, exorcising the previous 8-goal disaster by stopping every shot from the Eagles for nearly the entire match. Two goals by the Huskies in the middle of the match gave them a lead and forced BC into desperation mode towards the end. With their goaltender pulled, the Eagles cut the lead in half with less than three minutes to play. As time was winding down, Northeastern was assessed a hooking penalty, giving BC a de facto 2-man advantage but the defense was able to hold firm over the final 25 seconds and an empty-net goal with 2 seconds to play sealed the game. The surprising win sent Northeastern sent the Huskies to the semifinals where they were now just two wins away from an improbable tournament appearance. With #4 Maine as their next opponent, the Huskies' path didn't get any easier. Early in the match, their Cinderella looked like it was turning back into a pumpkin when the Black Bears were able to build a 2-goal lead early in the second and were bombarding Whitehead with shots. Once again, the second period was kind to the Huskies and the top line managed to score twice to tie the score. Early in the third, Andy Moore scored his first goal of the season to give the Huskies their first lead and, with Whitehead standing on his head, it looked like the team might just be able to pull off another huge upset. Maine upped the pressure and was able to tie the game in the latter half of the period, forcing the two sides into overtime to settle the score. Whitehead continued to turn aside shot after shot from the Bears, sending the game into a second overtime. After more than 90 minutes of ice time, the defense fell asleep and left a Maine forward sitting undefended by the side of the net. He knelt down on the ice and presented himself as a glorious scoring chance so that when the hard pass came to him from across the crease, the puck rebounded off of his blade, directly into the net on the Black Bears' 61st shot of the match.

== Departures ==
Player	Position	Nationality	Cause
Alex Campbell	Forward	Canada	Graduation (signed with Milwaukee Admirals)
Matt Choupani	Forward	Canada	Transferred to Miami
Patrick Dawson	Defenseman	United States	Graduation (retired)
Matt DeMelis	Forward	United States	Graduation (signed with Worcester Railers)
Braden Doyle	Defenseman	United States	Transferred to Niagara
Brett Edwards	Forward	Canada	Graduation (signed with Falher Pirates)
Gunnarwolfe Fontaine	Forward	United States	Graduate transfer to Ohio State
Connor Hopkins	Goaltender	United States	Graduation (retired)
Justin Hryckowian	Forward	Canada	Signed professional contract (Dallas Stars)
Hunter McDonald	Defenseman	United States	Signed professional contract (Philadelphia Flyers)
Michael Outzen	Forward	United States	Graduation (signed with EHC Zweibrücken)
Grant Riley	Goaltender	United States	Transferred to Lake Superior State
Matt Staudacher	Defenseman	United States	Graduation (signed with HC Falcons Bressanone)
Liam Walsh	Forward	United States	Graduation (signed with Savannah Ghost Pirates)
Pito Walton	Defenseman	United States	Graduation (signed with Florida Everblades)

== Recruiting ==
Player	Position	Nationality	Age	Notes
Jake Boltmann	Defenseman	United States	22	Edina, MN; graduate transfer from Notre Dame; selected 80th overall in 2020
Joe Connor	Forward	United States	19	Amherst, NH; selected 195th overall in 2024
Seth Constance	Defenseman	United States	19	Northville, MI
Griffin Erdman	Forward	United States	19	Wilmington, DE
James Fisher	Forward	United States	20	Burlington, MA; selected 203rd overall in 2022
Ethan Fredericks	Forward	United States	19	Sandy Springs, GA
Jack Henry	Defenseman	United States	20	Skaneateles, NY
Jake Higgins	Defenseman	United States	23	Hingham, MA; graduate transfer from Holy Cross
Joaquim Lemay	Defenseman	Canada	22	Saint-Pierre-les-Becquets, QC; transfer from Omaha; selected 119th overall in 2021
Marc Lund	Forward	United States	21	Edina, MN
Ryan McGuire	Forward	Canada	23	Sainte-Agathe-des-Monts, QC; transfer from Colgate
Benjamin Poitras	Forward	Canada	19	Montreal, QC
Nick Rhéaume	Forward	Canada	22	Sherbrooke, QC; transfer from Massachusetts Lowell
Quentin Sigurdson	Goaltender	United States	21	Sartell, MN
Cristophe Tellier	Forward	Canada	24	Sherbrooke, QC; transfer from Quinnipiac

== Roster ==
As of August 28, 2024.

No.	Nat.	Player	Class	Pos	Height	Weight	DoB	Hometown	Previous team	NHL rights
1	(United States)	Quentin Sigurdson	Freshman	G	6' 2" (1.88 m)	170 lb (77 kg)	2003-07-12	Sartell, Minnesota	Chicago Steel (USHL)	—
2	(Canada)	Joaquim Lemay	Junior	D	6' 1" (1.85 m)	184 lb (83 kg)	2002-07-28	Saint-Pierre-les-Becquets, Quebec	Omaha (USHL)	WSH, 119th overall 2021
3	(United States)	Nolan Hayes	Sophomore	D	6' 1" (1.85 m)	181 lb (82 kg)	2002-08-14	Boston, Massachusetts	West Kelowna Warriors (BCHL)	—
4	(United States)	Jake Boltmann (A)	Graduate	D	6' 1" (1.85 m)	200 lb (91 kg)	2001-10-19	Edina, Minnesota	Notre Dame (Big Ten)	CGY, 80th overall 2020
5	(United States)	Jack Henry	Freshman	D	6' 0" (1.83 m)	190 lb (86 kg)	2004-02-25	Skaneateles, New York	Madison Capitols (USHL)	—
6	(United States)	Jake Higgins	Graduate	D	6' 2" (1.88 m)	205 lb (93 kg)	2001-06-09	Hingham, Massachusetts	Holy Cross (AHA)	—
7	(United States)	Andy Moore	Sophomore	F	5' 11" (1.8 m)	195 lb (88 kg)	2002-01-21	Cumberland, Maine	Cedar Rapids RoughRiders (USHL)	—
8	(United States)	Jackson Dorrington (A)	Junior	D	6' 2" (1.88 m)	200 lb (91 kg)	2004-04-13	North Reading, Massachusetts	Des Moines Buccaneers (USHL)	VAN, 176th overall 2022
9	(United States)	Ryan McGuire	Senior	F	6' 2" (1.88 m)	183 lb (83 kg)	2002-07-27	New Canaan, Connecticut	Colgate (ECAC)	—
10	(United States)	Ethan Fredericks	Freshman	F	6' 2" (1.88 m)	207 lb (94 kg)	2004-11-22	Sandy Springs, Georgia	Omaha Lancers (USHL)	—
11	(Canada)	Eli Sebastian	Sophomore	F	5' 11" (1.8 m)	190 lb (86 kg)	2004-05-19	Burlington, Ontario	Green Bay Gamblers (USHL)	—
12	(United States)	Cameron Lund (A)	Junior	F	6' 2" (1.88 m)	190 lb (86 kg)	2004-06-07	Bridgewater, Massachusetts	Green Bay Gamblers (USHL)	SJS, 34th overall 2022
13	(Canada)	Dylan Hryckowian	Sophomore	F	5' 10" (1.78 m)	180 lb (82 kg)	2004-05-19	L'Île-Bizard, Quebec	Cedar Rapids RoughRiders (USHL)	—
14	(United States)	Joe Connor	Freshman	F	6' 1" (1.85 m)	200 lb (91 kg)	1999-07-14	Amherst, New Hampshire	Muskegon Lumberjacks (USHL)	TBL, 195th overall 2024
15	(United States)	Jack Williams (C)	Junior	F	5' 11" (1.8 m)	170 lb (77 kg)	2002-03-02	Biddeford, Maine	Muskegon Lumberjacks (USHL)	—
17	(United States)	Griffin Erdman	Freshman	F	5' 9" (1.75 m)	187 lb (85 kg)	2005-02-10	Wilmington, Delaware	Waterloo Black Hawks (USHL)	—
18	(United States)	James Fisher	Freshman	F	6' 2" (1.88 m)	185 lb (84 kg)	2004-04-28	Burlington, Massachusetts	Penticton Vees (BCHL)	CBJ, 203rd overall 2022
19	(United States)	Billy Norcross	Sophomore	F	6' 2" (1.88 m)	187 lb (85 kg)	2003-03-16	Lynn, Massachusetts	Penticton Vees (BCHL)	—
21	(United States)	Marc Lund	Freshman	F	6' 4" (1.93 m)	205 lb (93 kg)	2003-04-29	Edina, Minnesota	Fairbanks Ice Dogs (NAHL)	—
22	(United States)	Vinny Borgesi (A)	Junior	D	5' 8" (1.73 m)	170 lb (77 kg)	2004-03-02	Philadelphia, Pennsylvania	Tri-City Storm (USHL)	—
23	(Canada)	Ben Poitras	Freshman	F	5' 11" (1.8 m)	181 lb (82 kg)	2005-07-18	Montreal, Quebec	Green Bay Gamblers (USHL)	—
24	(United States)	Kyle Furey	Junior	D	6' 0" (1.83 m)	175 lb (79 kg)	2002-02-05	Marshfield, Massachusetts	Lone Star Brahmas (NAHL)	—
25	(Canada)	Nick Rhéaume	Junior	F	6' 2" (1.88 m)	200 lb (91 kg)	2002-05-02	Trois-Rivières, Quebec	Massachusetts Lowell (HEA)	—
27	(United States)	Seth Constance	Freshman	D	6' 2" (1.88 m)	187 lb (85 kg)	2004-10-26	Northville, Michigan	Tri-City Storm (USHL)	—
28	(United States)	Anthony Messuri	Junior	F	5' 8" (1.73 m)	170 lb (77 kg)	2001-07-24	Arlington, Massachusetts	Utica Jr. Comets (NCDC)	—
29	(Canada)	Cristophe Tellier	Senior	F	6' 1" (1.85 m)	185 lb (84 kg)	2000-05-23	Sherbrooke, Quebec	Quinnipiac (ECAC)	—
33	(United States)	Harrison Chesney	Junior	G	6' 3" (1.91 m)	170 lb (77 kg)	2001-12-07	Malverne, New York	P.A.L. Jr. Islanders (NCDC)	—
39	(Canada)	Cameron Whitehead	Sophomore	G	6' 3" (1.91 m)	185 lb (84 kg)	2003-06-13	Orleans, Ontario	Lincoln Stars (USHL)	VGK, 128th overall 2022

== Standings ==
2024–25 Hockey East Standings
	Conference record										Overall record					
	GP	W	L	T	OTW	OTL	SW	PTS	GF	GA	GP	W	L	T	GF	GA
#4 Boston College †	24	18	4	2	2	0	1	55	82	40	37	27	8	2	125	65
#8 Maine *	24	13	5	6	1	1	5	50	67	45	38	24	8	6	124	75
#2 Boston University	24	14	8	2	1	1	2	46	89	65	40	24	14	2	150	119
#7 Connecticut	24	12	8	4	3	2	1	40	76	65	39	23	12	4	130	97
#13 Providence	24	11	8	5	2	2	1	39	65	67	37	21	11	5	103	96
#10 Massachusetts	24	10	9	5	0	0	2	37	69	58	40	21	14	5	133	97
Massachusetts Lowell	24	8	13	3	0	1	2	30	57	69	36	16	16	4	93	101
Merrimack	24	9	14	1	1	0	1	28	57	81	35	13	21	1	81	112
Northeastern	24	7	14	3	1	1	2	26	48	71	37	14	20	3	88	112
New Hampshire	24	5	14	5	0	2	1	23	53	73	35	13	16	6	96	100
Vermont	24	6	16	2	2	3	1	22	59	88	35	11	21	3	100	116
Championship: March 21, 2025 † indicates regular season champion * indicates conference tournament champion (Lamoriello Trophy); Rankings: USCHO Division I Men's Poll

== Schedule and results ==
Date	Time	Opponent^{#}	Rank^{#}	Site	TV	Decision	Result	Attendance	Record
Exhibition
October 5	4:00 pm	at #8 Quinnipiac*	#20т	M&T Bank Arena • Hamden, Connecticut (Exhibition)	ESPN+		W 4–2		
Regular Season
October 12	7:00 pm	Stonehill*	#18	Matthews Arena • Boston, Massachusetts	ESPN+	Whitehead	W 5–1	2,976	1–0–0
October 18	9:00 pm	at #1 Denver*	#19	Magness Arena • Denver, Colorado		Whitehead	L 2–5	6,837	1–1–0
October 19	9:00 pm	at #1 Denver*	#19	Magness Arena • Denver, Colorado		Whitehead	L 2–5	7,051	1–2–0
October 25	7:00 pm	#6 Maine		Matthews Arena • Boston, Massachusetts	ESPN+	Whitehead	L 1–4	4,521	1–3–0 (0–1–0)
October 26	7:00 pm	#6 Maine		Matthews Arena • Boston, Massachusetts	ESPN+	Whitehead	T 2–2 ^{SOL}	4,739	1–3–1 (0–1–1)
November 8	7:00 pm	at #11 Providence		Schneider Arena • Providence, Rhode Island	ESPN+	Whitehead	T 2–2 ^{SOW}	2,721	1–3–2 (0–1–2)
November 9	7:00 pm	#11 Providence		Matthews Arena • Boston, Massachusetts	ESPN+	Whitehead	L 5–6 ^{OT}	3,698	1–4–2 (0–2–2)
November 15	7:00 pm	at New Hampshire		Whittemore Center • Durham, New Hampshire	ESPN+, NESN	Whitehead	L 1–4	5,937	1–5–2 (0–3–2)
November 16	7:00 pm	New Hampshire		Matthews Arena • Boston, Massachusetts	ESPN+	Whitehead	T 1–1 ^{SOW}	2,654	1–5–3 (0–3–3)
November 22	7:00 pm	at #3 Boston College		Conte Forum • Chestnut Hill, Massachusetts	ESPN+	Whitehead	L 0–3	7,884	1–6–3 (0–4–3)
November 23	7:00 pm	#3 Boston College		Matthews Arena • Boston, Massachusetts	ESPN+	Whitehead	W 4–2	4,739	2–6–3 (1–4–3)
December 1	3:00 pm	Bentley*		Matthews Arena • Boston, Massachusetts	ESPN+	Whitehead	W 3–1	2,103	3–6–3
December 6	7:00 pm	New Hampshire		Matthews Arena • Boston, Massachusetts	ESPN+	Whitehead	L 3–5	2,276	3–7–3 (1–5–3)
December 7	7:00 pm	Brown*		Matthews Arena • Boston, Massachusetts	ESPN+	Whitehead	W 4–3	2,009	4–7–3
December 14	7:00 pm	at Merrimack		J. Thom Lawler Rink • North Andover, Massachusetts	ESPN+, NESN	Whitehead	L 1–4	1,717	4–8–3 (1–6–3)
Ledyard Bank Classic
December 28	4:00 pm	vs. #7 Providence*		Thompson Arena • Hanover, New Hampshire (Ledyard Bank Semifinal)	ESPN+	Whitehead	L 1–3	2,755	4–9–3
December 29	4:00 pm	vs. Alaska Anchorage*		Thompson Arena • Hanover, New Hampshire (Ledyard Bank Consolation Game)	ESPN+	Whitehead	W 4–3	2,436	5–9–3
January 4	4:00 pm	at #18 Quinnipiac*		M&T Bank Arena • Hamden, Connecticut	ESPN+	Whitehead	W 5–1	3,088	6–9–3
January 10	7:00 pm	Massachusetts		Matthews Arena • Boston, Massachusetts	ESPN+, NESN	Whitehead	L 0–5	4,405	6–10–3 (1–7–3)
January 11	6:00 pm	at Massachusetts		Mullins Center • Amherst, Massachusetts	ESPN+	Whitehead	W 3–0	4,078	7–10–3 (2–7–3)
January 17	7:00 pm	at Vermont		Gutterson Fieldhouse • Burlington, Vermont	ESPN+	Whitehead	W 2–1 ^{OT}	2,757	8–10–3 (3–7–3)
January 18	6:00 pm	at Vermont		Gutterson Fieldhouse • Burlington, Vermont	ESPN+	Whitehead	W 3–2	3,292	9–10–3 (4–7–3)
January 25	7:00 pm	Merrimack		Matthews Arena • Boston, Massachusetts	ESPN+	Whitehead	L 3–4	3,809	9–11–3 (4–8–3)
January 31	7:00 pm	at #6 Maine		Alfond Arena • Orono, Maine	ESPN+	Whitehead	L 1–3	4,905	9–12–3 (4–9–3)
Beanpot
February 3	8:00 pm	vs. #1 Boston College*		TD Garden • Boston, Massachusetts (Beanpot Semifinal)	NESN	Whitehead	L 2–8	—	9–13–3
February 12	4:30 pm	vs. Harvard*		TD Garden • Boston, Massachusetts (Beanpot Consolation Game)	NESN	Sigurdson	L 3–4	18,258	9–14–3
February 14	7:00 pm	#13 Massachusetts Lowell		Matthews Arena • Boston, Massachusetts	ESPN+	Sigurdson	W 2–0	2,192	10–14–3 (5–9–3)
February 15	6:05 pm	at #13 Massachusetts Lowell		Tsongas Center • Lowell, Massachusetts	ESPN+	Sigurdson	L 1–3	5,305	10–15–3 (5–10–3)
February 21	7:00 pm	at #9 Boston University		Agganis Arena • Boston, Massachusetts	ESPN+	Whitehead	W 5–1	5,727	11–15–3 (6–10–3)
February 22	7:00 pm	#9 Boston University		Matthews Arena • Boston, Massachusetts	ESPN+	Whitehead	L 1–3	4,687	11–16–3 (6–11–3)
February 28	7:00 pm	at #9 Connecticut		Toscano Family Ice Forum • Storrs, Connecticut	ESPN+	Whitehead	L 2–5	2,691	11–17–3 (6–12–3)
March 1	7:30 pm	#9 Connecticut		Matthews Arena • Boston, Massachusetts	ESPN+	Sigurdson	L 1–7	3,008	11–18–3 (6–13–3)
March 6	7:00 pm	at Merrimack		J. Thom Lawler Rink • North Andover, Massachusetts	ESPN+	Whitehead	W 2–1	1,877	12–18–3 (7–13–3)
March 8	7:00 pm	#6 Providence		Matthews Arena • Boston, Massachusetts	ESPN+	Whitehead	L 2–3	3,398	12–19–3 (7–14–3)
Hockey East Tournament
March 12	7:00 pm	at Merrimack*		J. Thom Lawler Rink • North Andover, Massachusetts (Hockey East Opening Round)	ESPN+	Whitehead	W 3–2 ^{2OT}	1,987	13–19–3
March 15	7:30 pm	at #1 Boston College*		Conte Forum • Chestnut Hill, Massachusetts (Hockey East Quarterfinal)	ESPN+, NESN+	Whitehead	W 3–1	6,034	14–19–3
March 20	7:30 pm	vs. #4 Maine*		TD Garden • Boston, Massachusetts (Hockey East Semifinal)	ESPN+, NESN+	Whitehead	L 3–4 ^{2OT}	14,313	14–20–3
*Non-conference game. ^{#}Rankings from USCHO.com Poll. All times are in Eastern Time. Source:

== Scoring statistics ==
Name	Position	Games	Goals	Assists	Points	PIM
Jack Williams	RW	37	16	25	41	25
Cameron Lund	C/W	37	18	22	40	14
Dylan Hryckowian	RW	36	17	19	36	26
Vinny Borgesi	D	32	5	17	22	16
Cristophe Tellier	LW	36	5	13	18	36
Joe Connor	C/LW	37	7	10	17	47
Jackson Dorrington	D	37	2	13	15	20
Joaquim Lemay	D	30	3	9	12	29
Jake Boltmann	D	35	2	10	12	39
Ryan McGuire	C	37	4	3	7	14
Nick Rhéaume	C/LW	37	2	2	4	39
Andy Moore	F	36	1	3	4	10
Jake Higgins	D	36	2	1	3	4
Benjamin Poitras	C	31	1	2	3	26
Griffin Erdman	F	37	1	2	3	2
James Fisher	C/RW	24	1	1	2	6
Eli Sebastian	C	33	1	0	1	0
Quentin Sigurdson	G	6	0	1	1	0
Anthony Messuri	F	15	0	1	1	0
Billy Norcross	C/RW	22	0	1	1	2
Jack Henry	D	32	0	1	1	6
Cameron Whitehead	G	35	0	1	1	0
Seth Constance	D	36	0	1	1	4
Kyle Furey	D	3	0	0	0	0
Ethan Fredericks	F	5	0	0	0	0
Nolan Hayes	D	5	0	0	0	2
Bench	–	–	–	–	–	30
Total			88	158	246	397

== Goaltending statistics ==
Name	Games	Minutes	Wins	Losses	Ties	Goals against	Saves	Shut outs	SV %	GAA
Quentin Sigurdson	6	197:26	1	3	0	7	81	1	.920	2.13
Cameron Whitehead	35	2082:05	13	17	3	95	973	1	.911	2.74
Empty Net	-	19:28	-	-	-	10	-	-	-	-
Total	37	2298:59	14	20	3	112	1054	2	.904	2.92

== Rankings ==
Poll	Week																											
Poll	Pre	1	2	3	4	5	6	7	8	9	10	11	12	13	14	15	16	17	18	19	20	21	22	23	24	25	26	27 (Final)
USCHO.com	20т	18	19	RV	RV	RV	RV	NR	RV	RV	NR	NR	–	NR	RV	RV	RV	RV	NR	NR	NR	NR	NR	NR	RV	NR	–	NR
USA Hockey	RV	20	19	RV	RV	RV	RV	NR	NR	NR	NR	NR	–	NR	NR	RV	RV	NR	NR	NR	NR	NR	NR	NR	RV	NR	NR	NR

Note: USCHO did not release a poll in week 12 or 26.
Note: USA Hockey did not release a poll in week 12.

== Awards and honors ==
Player	Award	Ref
Cameron Lund	All-Hockey East Third Team	

== 2025 NHL entry draft ==
Round	Pick	Player	NHL team
3	70	Sean Barnhill ^{†}	New York Rangers
6	164	Nathan Quinn ^{†}	Philadelphia Flyers

† incoming freshman
