= 2024–25 Providence Friars men's ice hockey season =

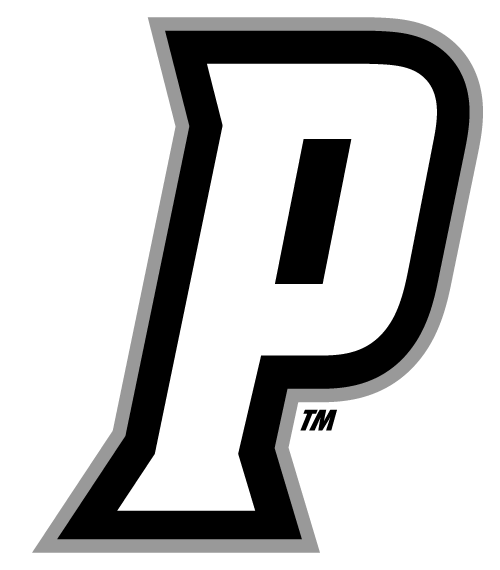

Ledyard Bank Classic, Champion NCAA Tournament, Regional Semifinal
- Conference: 5th Hockey East
- Home ice: Schneider Arena

Rankings
- USCHO: #13
- USA Hockey: #14

Record
- Overall: 21–11–5
- Conference: 11–8–5
- Home: 9–4–3
- Road: 9–6–2
- Neutral: 3–1–0

Coaches and captains
- Head coach: Nate Leaman
- Assistant coaches: Ron Rolston; Joel Beal; Joe Palmer
- Captain(s): Chase Yoder; Nick Poisson
- Alternate captain(s): Connor Kelley; Guillaume Richard

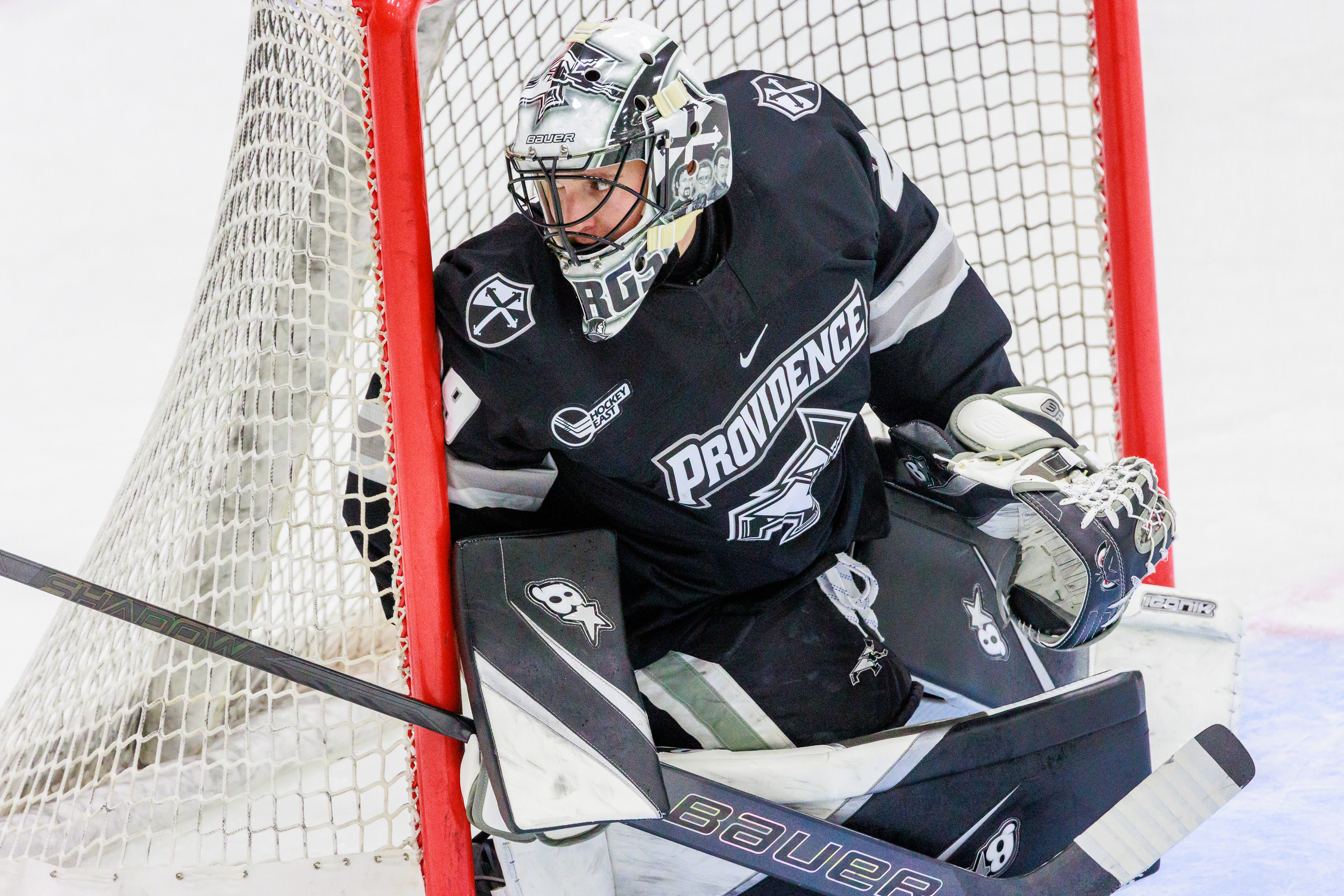
Zachary Borgiel made 29 saves to shutout Brown on January 7

The 2024–25 Providence Friars Men's ice hockey season was the 74th season of play for the program and 41st in Hockey East. The Friars represented Providence College in the 2024–25 NCAA Division I men's ice hockey season, played their home games at Schneider Arena and were coached by Nate Leaman in his 14th season.

== Season ==
While Providence entered the season with its top five scorers returning, the Friars offense wasn't particularly strong to begin with. More importantly, however, was that starting goaltender Philip Svedebäck was back and he would now be backed up by Zachary Borgiel, who had previously been the starter for Merrimack. With the defense returning three of its top four blueliners, Providence appeared to have a solid foundation for the year and they demonstrated as much with a very strong start. While the offensive production was modest, it was consistent and allowed the team to take advantage of the strong goaltending tandem. After dropping the season opener, the Friars didn't lose another game for over a month and were able to climb into the top-10 by mid-November.

After a small hiccup just before Thanksgiving, Svedebäck started receiving the lion's share of minutes. Providence went on an 8-game winning streak in the middle of their season which included two in-season tournaments. When the team played their annual rivalry game against cross-town rival Brown, Providence had risen up to #5 and was well positioned for a tournament appearance. At that point in the season, the Friars had a tremendous opportunity when they faced off against #2 Boston College. The games against the Eagles began a five-week stretch of games against ranked opponents that could make or break their season. The Friars' offense did not fare well against the strong competition. Contrary to the first half of the year, the scoring was wildly inconsistent and Providence was shutout four times during the stretch. Even when the team was able to score, the goaltending wasn't up to the same level as earlier in the year and the Friars could only post 2 wins over the 10 games.

While the month-long troubles didn't help Providence, the team was buoyed by their strength of schedule. The Friars remained in the top 10 in both the polls and the PairWise rankings despite the rough stretch. After recovering a bit at the end of the year, Providence still found itself with a guaranteed at-large berth as well as a bye into the conference quarterfinals. Providence headed west to face Connecticut, another tournament-bound team, and got off to a good start. Guillaume Richard opened the scoring less than 4 minutes into the game with a shot-handed goal. Svedebäck stood tall in goal despite not having played in a couple of weeks and stopped every shot that came his way for over half the match. Unfortunately, Providence was unable to capitalize on the stellar goaltending they were receiving and failed to build on their lead. The Huskies finally managed to tie the game near the end of the second period and then jumped into the lead just 20 seconds into the third. Despite the Friar's tremendous record in close games throughout the season, the offense did not rise to the occasion. UConn retained their narrow lead until late in the game when Svedebäck was pulled and an empty-net goal ended the team's hoped for a conference championship.

Two weeks later, the team was making its first NCAA appearance since before the COVID-19 pandemic and did so against the defending national champions, Denver. Providence fell behind early but limited the damage to a single goal in the first. The second saw both team get into penalty trouble by taking three minors apiece. Unfortunately, it was Denver who converted, scoring twice in the middle frame to build a considerable advantage. After a fourth goal from the Pioneers at the start of the third, it looked like Providence's season was nearing its end. Past the midway point of the period, Denver was handed a major penalty for elbowing and opened the door for the Friars. It took just 4 seconds for Austen May to get his team on the board with his first goal of the season. Unfortunately for the Friars, their lack of offensive punch came back to haunt them and the team failed to score any further goals. In desperation, Svedebäck was pulled towards the end of the man-advantage and Denver was able to salt away the match with a fifth goal into the vacated net. As time ticked away, the game got a bit chippy and both sides were assessed matching game-misconduct penalties but that did not alter the final outcome.

== Departures ==
Player	Position	Nationality	Cause
Brady Berard	Forward	United States	Transferred to Boston College
Marcus Brännman	Goaltender	Sweden	Transferred to Clarkson
Jaroslav Chmelař	Forward	Czech Republic	Signed professional contract (New York Rangers)
Riley Duran	Forward	United States	Signed professional contract (Boston Bruins)
Jamie Engelbert	Forward	Canada	Graduation (retired)
Matt Hubbarde	Forward	Canada	Transferred to Alaska
Cal Kiefiuk	Forward	United States	Graduation (signed with Wheeling Nailers)
Luke Krys	Defenseman	United States	Graduation (signed with Dallas Stars)
Cam McDonald	Defenseman	United States	Graduation (signed with Bridgeport Islanders)
Craig Needham	Forward	United States	Graduation (signed with Florida Everblades)
Bennett Schimek	Forward	United States	Transferred to Arizona State
Will Schimek	Defenseman	United States	Transferred to Alaska Anchorage
Liam Valente	Forward	Sweden	Transferred to Western Michigan

== Recruiting ==
Player	Position	Nationality	Age	Notes
Alexander Bales	Defenseman	United States	18	East Amherst, NY
Zachary Borgiel	Goaltender	United States	24	Fort Gratiot, MI; graduate transfer from Merrimack
Braiden Clark	Forward	United States	19	Upper Arlington, OH
Trevor Connelly	Forward	United States	18	Tustin, CA; selected 19th overall in 2024
Will Elger	Forward	United States	19	Westerville, OH
Carl Fish	Defenseman	United States	24	Saint Paul, MN; graduate transfer from Minnesota
Cameron Gendron	Forward	United States	25	Wilmington, MA; graduate transfer from New Hampshire
Aleksi Kivioja	Forward	Finland	21	Helsinki, FIN
Tomas Machů	Defenseman	Czech Republic	21	Ostrava, CZE; selected 221st overall in 2021
Geno McEnery	Forward	United States	20	Geneva, IL
John Mustard	Forward	Canada	18	Newmarket, ON; selected 67th overall in 2024
Ryan O'Reilly	Forward	United States	24	Southlake, TX; graduate transfer from Arizona State; selected 98th overall in 2018
Logan Sawyer	Forward	Canada	18	Orangeville, ON; selected 78th overall in 2024
Logan Will	Forward	United States	24	Ames, IA; graduate transfer from Colorado College

== Roster ==
As of September 8, 2024.

No.	Nat.	Player	Class	Pos	Height	Weight	DoB	Hometown	Previous team	NHL rights
1	(United States)	John Driscoll	Senior	G	5' 11" (1.8 m)	170 lb (77 kg)	2000-04-09	Milton, Massachusetts	Northeast Generals (NA3HL)	—
2	(Czech Republic)	Tomas Machů	Freshman	D	6' 4" (1.93 m)	194 lb (88 kg)	2003-03-02	Ostrava, Czech Republic	Youngstown Phantoms (USHL)	NYI, 221st overall 2021
4	(Canada)	Guillaume Richard	Senior	D	6' 2" (1.88 m)	175 lb (79 kg)	2003-02-10	Cap-Santé, Quebec	Tri-City Storm (USHL)	CBJ, 101st overall 2021
5	(Finland)	Samo Meritähti	Freshman (RS)	D	6' 3" (1.91 m)	192 lb (87 kg)	2003-03-06	Seinäjoki, Finland	Omaha Lancers (USHL)	—
6	(United States)	Alexander Bales	Freshman	D	5' 10" (1.78 m)	181 lb (82 kg)	2006-07-06	East Amherst, New York	Tri-City Storm (USHL)	—
8	(United States)	Braiden Clark	Freshman	F	5' 11" (1.8 m)	190 lb (86 kg)	2005-04-08	Upper Arlington, Ohio	Youngstown Phantoms (USHL)	—
9	(Canada)	Hudson Malinoski	Sophomore	F	6' 1" (1.85 m)	184 lb (83 kg)	2004-05-19	Saskatoon, Saskatchewan	Brooks Bandits (AJHL)	TOR, 153rd overall 2023
10	(United States)	Logan Will	Graduate	F	5' 11" (1.8 m)	185 lb (84 kg)	2000-06-14	Ames, Iowa	Colorado College (NCHC)	—
11	(Canada)	Graham Gamache	Sophomore	F	5' 11" (1.8 m)	179 lb (81 kg)	2002-06-11	Edmonton, Alberta	Tri-City Storm (USHL)	—
12	(Canada)	Nick Poisson (A)	Graduate	F	5' 11" (1.8 m)	185 lb (84 kg)	2001-08-15	Vancouver, British Columbia	Prince George Spruce Kings (BCHL)	—
13	(United States)	Geno McEnery	Freshman	F	6' 0" (1.83 m)	190 lb (86 kg)	2003-10-21	Geneva, Illinois	Oklahoma Warriors (NAHL)	—
14	(Finland)	Aleksi Kivioja	Freshman	F	6' 5" (1.96 m)	220 lb (100 kg)	2003-08-02	Helsinki, Finland	Omaha Lancers (USHL)	—
15	(United States)	Will Elger	Freshman	F	6' 2" (1.88 m)	174 lb (79 kg)	2004-12-29	Westerville, Ohio	Omaha Lancers (USHL)	—
16	(United States)	Trevor Connelly	Freshman	F	6' 1" (1.85 m)	161 lb (73 kg)	2006-02-28	Tustin, California	Tri-City Storm (USHL)	VGK, 19th overall 2024
17	(United States)	Chase Yoder (C)	Graduate	F	5' 11" (1.8 m)	185 lb (84 kg)	2002-05-28	Fairview, Texas	USNTDP (USHL)	PIT, 170th overall 2020
18	(United States)	Cam Gendron	Graduate	D	6' 3" (1.91 m)	181 lb (82 kg)	1999-02-05	Hampstead, New Hampshire	New Hampshire (HEA)	—
19	(United States)	Tanner Adams	Sophomore	F	5' 11" (1.8 m)	185 lb (84 kg)	2005-09-02	Northport, New York	Tri-City Storm (USHL)	—
20	(Canada)	Logan Sawyer	Freshman	F	6' 1" (1.85 m)	174 lb (79 kg)	2006-05-06	Orangeville, Ontario	Brooks Bandits (BCHL)	MTL, 78th overall 2024
21	(Canada)	John Mustard	Freshman	F	6' 1" (1.85 m)	185 lb (84 kg)	2006-08-16	Newmarket, Ontario	Waterloo Black Hawks (USHL)	CHI, 67th overall 2024
22	(United States)	Clint Levens	Sophomore	F	6' 2" (1.88 m)	189 lb (86 kg)	2003-06-19	Windermere, Florida	Sioux Falls Stampede (USHL)	—
23	(United States)	Andrew Centrella	Sophomore	D	5' 9" (1.75 m)	177 lb (80 kg)	2004-01-29	Philadelphia, Pennsylvania	Youngstown Phantoms (USHL)	—
24	(United States)	Austen May	Junior	D	5' 11" (1.8 m)	160 lb (73 kg)	2003-05-19	Woodhaven, Michigan	Sioux Falls Stampede (USHL)	—
25	(United States)	Connor Kelley	Graduate	D	6' 1" (1.85 m)	190 lb (86 kg)	2002-01-30	Maple Grove, Minnesota	Minnesota Duluth (NCHC)	CHI, 204th overall 2021
26	(United States)	Carl Fish	Graduate	D	6' 3" (1.91 m)	210 lb (95 kg)	1999-11-09	Saint Paul, Minnesota	Minnesota (Big Ten)	—
27	(Canada)	Taige Harding	Senior	D	6' 7" (2.01 m)	230 lb (104 kg)	2002-01-03	St. Albert, Alberta	Fort McMurray Oil Barons (AJHL)	CHI, 91st overall 2021
29	(United States)	Zachary Borgiel	Graduate	G	6' 2" (1.88 m)	212 lb (96 kg)	2000-04-27	Fort Gratiot, Michigan	Merrimack (HEA)	—
35	(Sweden)	Philip Svedebäck	Sophomore	G	6' 4" (1.93 m)	210 lb (95 kg)	2002-05-28	Växjö, Sweden	Dubuque Fighting Saints (USHL)	BOS, 117th overall 2021
39	(United States)	Ryan O'Reilly	Graduate	F	6' 3" (1.91 m)	220 lb (100 kg)	2000-03-21	Southlake, Texas	Arizona State (NCAA)	DET, 98th overall 2018

== Standings ==
2024–25 Hockey East Standings
	Conference record										Overall record					
	GP	W	L	T	OTW	OTL	SW	PTS	GF	GA	GP	W	L	T	GF	GA
#4 Boston College †	24	18	4	2	2	0	1	55	82	40	37	27	8	2	125	65
#8 Maine *	24	13	5	6	1	1	5	50	67	45	38	24	8	6	124	75
#2 Boston University	24	14	8	2	1	1	2	46	89	65	40	24	14	2	150	119
#7 Connecticut	24	12	8	4	3	2	1	40	76	65	39	23	12	4	130	97
#13 Providence	24	11	8	5	2	2	1	39	65	67	37	21	11	5	103	96
#10 Massachusetts	24	10	9	5	0	0	2	37	69	58	40	21	14	5	133	97
Massachusetts Lowell	24	8	13	3	0	1	2	30	57	69	36	16	16	4	93	101
Merrimack	24	9	14	1	1	0	1	28	57	81	35	13	21	1	81	112
Northeastern	24	7	14	3	1	1	2	26	48	71	37	14	20	3	88	112
New Hampshire	24	5	14	5	0	2	1	23	53	73	35	13	16	6	96	100
Vermont	24	6	16	2	2	3	1	22	59	88	35	11	21	3	100	116
Championship: March 21, 2025 † indicates regular season champion * indicates conference tournament champion (Lamoriello Trophy); Rankings: USCHO Division I Men's Poll

== Schedule and results ==
Date	Time	Opponent^{#}	Rank^{#}	Site	TV	Decision	Result	Attendance	Record
Exhibition
October 5	1:00 pm	at Union*	#13	Achilles Rink • Schenectady, New York (Exhibition)	ESPN+		W 4–1		
Regular Season
October 12	7:07 pm	at #6 North Dakota*	#13	Ralph Engelstad Arena • Grand Forks, North Dakota (US Hockey Hall of Fame Game)	Midco	Svedebäck	L 2–5	11,703	0–1–0
October 18	7:00 pm	Arizona State*	#14	Schneider Arena • Providence, Rhode Island	ESPN+	Svedebäck	W 4–1	3,030	1–1–0
October 19	4:00 pm	Arizona State*	#14	Schneider Arena • Providence, Rhode Island	ESPN+	Borgiel	W 2–1	2,360	2–1–0
October 25	7:00 pm	at Vermont	#13	Gutterson Fieldhouse • Burlington, Vermont	ESPN+	Svedebäck	W 3–2 ^{OT}	2,283	3–1–0 (1–0–0)
October 26	6:00 pm	at Vermont	#13	Gutterson Fieldhouse • Burlington, Vermont	ESPN+	Borgiel	T 4–4 ^{SOW}	2,398	3–1–1 (1–0–1)
November 1	7:00 pm	New Hampshire	#12	Schneider Arena • Providence, Rhode Island	ESPN+, NESN	Svedebäck	W 6–3	2,029	4–1–1 (2–0–1)
November 2	7:00 pm	at New Hampshire	#12	Whittemore Center • Durham, New Hampshire	ESPN+, NESN	Borgiel	W 3–0	4,857	5–1–1 (3–0–1)
November 8	7:00 pm	Northeastern	#11	Schneider Arena • Providence, Rhode Island	ESPN+	Svedebäck	T 2–2 ^{SOL}	2,721	5–1–2 (3–0–2)
November 9	7:00 pm	at Northeastern	#11	Matthews Arena • Boston, Massachusetts	ESPN+	Svedebäck	W 6–5 ^{OT}	3,698	6–1–2 (4–0–2)
November 14	7:00 pm	at Massachusetts	#10	Mullins Center • Amherst, Massachusetts	ESPN+	Svedebäck	W 2–1	4,356	7–1–2 (5–0–2)
November 16	6:00 pm	Massachusetts	#10	Schneider Arena • Providence, Rhode Island	ESPN+	Borgiel	L 1–5	2,851	7–2–2 (5–1–2)
November 19	7:00 pm	#3 Boston College	#10	Schneider Arena • Providence, Rhode Island	ESPN+	Svedebäck	L 2–3 ^{OT}	3,015	7–3–2 (5–2–2)
November 23	6:00 pm	Long Island*	#10	Schneider Arena • Providence, Rhode Island	ESPN+	Svedebäck	W 4–3 ^{OT}	2,032	8–3–2
Adirondack Winter Invitational
November 29	7:30 pm	vs. #20 Clarkson*	#10	Herb Brooks Arena • Lake Placid, New York (Winter Invitational Game 1)	ESPN+	Svedebäck	W 3–2 ^{OT}	2,407	9–3–2
November 30	4:00 pm	vs. St. Lawrence*	#10	Herb Brooks Arena • Lake Placid, New York (Winter Invitational Game 2)	ESPN+	Borgiel	W 2–1	2,237	10–3–2
December 6	7:00 pm	#8 Colorado College*	#10	Schneider Arena • Providence, Rhode Island	ESPN+	Svedebäck	W 4–3	2,641	11–3–2
December 7	6:00 pm	#8 Colorado College*	#10	Schneider Arena • Providence, Rhode Island	ESPN+	Svedebäck	W 5–1	2,418	12–3–2
Ledyard Bank Classic
December 28	4:00 pm	vs. Northeastern*	#7	Thompson Arena • Hanover, New Hampshire (Ledyard Bank Semifinal)	ESPN+	Svedebäck	W 3–1	2,755	13–3–2
December 29	7:30 pm	at #17 Dartmouth*	#7	Thompson Arena • Hanover, New Hampshire (Ledyard Bank Championship)	ESPN+	Svedebäck	W 5–3	3,031	14–3–2
January 7	7:00 pm	at Brown*	#5	Meehan Auditorium • Providence, Rhode Island (Mayor's Cup)	ESPN+	Borgiel	W 2–0	1,938	15–3–2
January 17	7:00 pm	at #2 Boston College	#6	Conte Forum • Chestnut Hill, Massachusetts	ESPN+	Svedebäck	L 0–3	7,884	15–4–2 (5–3–2)
January 18	7:00 pm	#2 Boston College	#6	Schneider Arena • Providence, Rhode Island	ESPN+	Svedebäck	L 1–4	3,030	15–5–2 (5–4–2)
January 24	7:15 pm	at #12 Massachusetts Lowell	#7	Tsongas Center • Lowell, Massachusetts	ESPN+	Svedebäck	T 3–3 ^{SOL}	—	15–5–3 (5–4–3)
January 25	4:30 pm	#12 Massachusetts Lowell	#7	Schneider Arena • Providence, Rhode Island	ESPN+	Borgiel	L 0–1	2,967	15–6–3 (5–5–3)
January 31	7:00 pm	#9 Connecticut	#7	Schneider Arena • Providence, Rhode Island	ESPN+, NESN+	Svedebäck	T 3–3 ^{SOL}	2,805	15–6–4 (5–5–4)
February 1	3:30 pm	at #9 Connecticut	#7	XL Center • Hartford, Connecticut	ESPN+	Borgiel	W 6–3	11,781	16–6–4 (6–5–4)
February 7	7:00 pm	#5 Maine	#7	Schneider Arena • Providence, Rhode Island	ESPN+	Svedebäck	T 3–3 ^{SOL}	2,720	16–6–5 (6–5–5)
February 8	6:00 pm	#5 Maine	#7	Schneider Arena • Providence, Rhode Island	ESPN+	Svedebäck	L 0–1 ^{OT}	2,797	16–7–5 (6–6–5)
February 14	7:00 pm	#9 Boston University	#7	Schneider Arena • Providence, Rhode Island	ESPN+	Svedebäck	W 6–3	2,516	17–7–5 (7–6–5)
February 15	7:00 pm	at #9 Boston University	#7	Agganis Arena • Boston, Massachusetts	ESPN+	Svedebäck	L 0–3	5,231	17–8–5 (7–7–5)
February 22	6:00 pm	#13 Massachusetts Lowell	#8	Schneider Arena • Providence, Rhode Island	ESPN+	Svedebäck	W 4–2	2,545	18–8–5 (8–7–5)
February 28	7:00 pm	Merrimack	#7	Schneider Arena • Providence, Rhode Island	ESPN+	Svedebäck	W 3–2	2,706	19–8–5 (9–7–5)
March 1	7:00 pm	at Merrimack	#7	J. Thom Lawler Rink • North Andover, Massachusetts	ESPN+	Borgiel	W 2–1	2,439	20–8–5 (10–7–5)
March 6	7:00 pm	at #10 Boston University	#6	Agganis Arena • Boston, Massachusetts	ESPN+	Borgiel	L 2–8	4,826	20–9–5 (10–8–5)
March 8	7:00 pm	at Northeastern	#6	Matthews Arena • Boston, Massachusetts	ESPN+	Borgiel	W 3–2	3,398	21–9–5 (11–8–5)
Hockey East Tournament
March 14	7:00 pm	at #8 Connecticut*	#7	Toscano Family Ice Forum • Storrs, Connecticut (Hockey East Quarterfinal)	ESPN+, NESN	Svedebäck	L 1–3	2,691	21–10–5
NCAA Tournament
March 28	5:30 pm	vs. #6 Denver*	#10	SNHU Arena • Manchester, New Hampshire (Regional Semifinal)	ESPN+	Svedebäck	L 1–5	7,368	21–11–5
*Non-conference game. ^{#}Rankings from USCHO.com Poll. All times are in Eastern Time. Source:

== NCAA tournament ==
March 28, 2025; 5:30 pm	(2) Providence	1–5 (0–1, 0–2, 1–2)	(3) Denver	SNHU Arena; Attendance: 7,368

Game reference

Philip Svedebäck
Goalies
Matt Davis
Referees:
Andrew Bruggeman
David Marcotte
Linesmen:
Justin Cornell
Pat Richardson

	0–1	02:25 – Connor Caponi (5) (unassisted)
	0–2	23:17 – GW – Zeev Buium (12) (Thompson, King)
	0–3	26:01 – PP – Sam Harris (23) (Buium, King)
	0–4	43:53 – Aidan Thompson (20) (Buium, Salminen)
(Will) Austen May (1) – PP – 51:39	1–4
	1–5	55:09 – SH EN – Carter King (17) (unassisted)

18 min
Penalties
33 min
31
Shots
20

Game summary

== Scoring statistics ==
Name	Position	Games	Goals	Assists	Points	PIM
Logan Will	F	37	8	16	24	4
Hudson Malinoski	C	35	11	12	23	26
Tanner Adams	C/RW	37	11	11	22	8
Graham Gamache	F	37	10	10	20	10
John Mustard	LW	37	7	13	20	14
Will Elger	F	36	8	10	18	4
Nick Poisson	F	37	8	8	16	16
Logan Sawyer	LW	37	6	10	16	10
Andrew Centrella	D	34	2	12	14	8
Guillaume Richard	D	37	2	12	14	14
Taige Harding	D	37	2	12	14	46
Austen May	D	34	1	13	14	6
Trevor Connelly	LW	23	4	9	13	29
Chase Yoder	C/W	37	5	5	10	18
Ryan O'Reilly	C/W	26	6	3	9	6
Aleksi Kivioja	C/W	28	3	5	8	10
Clint Levens	C	22	3	3	6	18
Tomas Machů	D	30	2	4	6	27
Alexander Bales	D	32	2	3	5	10
Connor Kelley	D	37	1	3	4	24
Braiden Clark	C	16	1	2	3	2
Cameron Gendron	F	7	0	0	0	0
Carl Fish	D	10	0	0	0	0
Philip Svedebäck	G	26	0	2	2	0
Zachary Borgiel	G	12	0	0	0	0
Bench	–	–	–	–	–	0
Total			103	178	281	322

== Goaltending statistics ==
Name	Games	Minutes	Wins	Losses	Ties	Goals against	Saves	Shut outs	SV %	GAA
Philip Svedebäck	26	1562:16	14	8	4	63	647	0	.911	2.42
Zachary Borgiel	12	686:02	7	3	1	29	293	2	.910	2.54
Empty Net	-	10:56	-	-	-	4	-	-	-	-
Total	37	2259:14	21	11	5	96	940	2	.907	2.55

== Rankings ==
Poll	Week																											
Poll	Pre	1	2	3	4	5	6	7	8	9	10	11	12	13	14	15	16	17	18	19	20	21	22	23	24	25	26	27 (Final)
USCHO.com	13	13	14	13	12	11	10	10	10	10	7	7	–	5	5	6 (1)	7	7	7	7	8	7	6	7	10	10	–	13
USA Hockey	13	11	14	12	12	11	9	11	10	10	7	7	–	5	4	4	6	7	7	7	9	7	6	8	10	10	13	14

Note: USCHO did not release a poll in week 12 or 26.
Note: USA Hockey did not release a poll in week 12.

== Awards and honors ==
Player	Award	Ref
Guillaume Richard	All-Hockey East Second Team	

== 2025 NHL entry draft ==
Round	Pick	Player	NHL team
1	10	Roger McQueen ^{†}	Anaheim Ducks
5	150	Max Heise ^{†}	San Jose Sharks

† incoming freshman
