= 2024–25 New Hampshire Wildcats men's ice hockey season =

- Conference: 10th Hockey East
- Home ice: Whittemore Center

Rankings
- USCHO: NR
- USA Hockey: NR

Record
- Overall: 13–16–6
- Conference: 5–14–5
- Home: 6–7–2
- Road: 7–9–4

Coaches and captains
- Head coach: Mike Souza
- Assistant coaches: Glenn Stewart; Jeff Giuliano
- Captain: Alex Gagne
- Alternate captain(s): Nikolai Jenson; Connor Sweeney

The 2024–25 New Hampshire Wildcats Men's ice hockey season was the 99th season of play for the program and the 41st in Hockey East. The Wildcats represented the University of New Hampshire in the 2024–25 NCAA Division I men's ice hockey season, played their home games at the Whittemore Center and were coached by Mike Souza in his 7th season.

== Season ==
New Hampshire entered the season with some uncertainty about its goaltending situation. Having lost both of the netminders who appeared the previous season, the Wildcats went with the combination of two transfers in Rico DiMatteo and Jared Whale. Whale won the starting job out of training camp and remained in goal despite some up and down play early in the year. During the first few weeks of the season, the team mirrored their goaltender's performance, alternating between good and bad nights before finally settling down in mid-November. UNH began to show some of the promise the club had only hinted at over the previous few seasons, scoring at a solid clip while the defense insulated Whale. Ryan Conmy led the way during their winning stretch, scoring in every game from November 9 to January 4. The Wildcat's 8–1–2 record during that time also earned the club a return to the national polls and they even made it into the top-16 of the PairWise, giving them a shot for an at-large bid.

The team was riding high going into their series with Connecticut in mid-January. The offense faltered a bit in the two games, resulting in losses, and presaged a disastrous run of games that destroyed any chance of UNH returning to the national tournament. Over a nearly two month span, New Hampshire's scoring virtually disappeared. In 15 games, the Wildcats were only able to score more than 2 goals in 4 matches. That problem was then compounded by the sudden struggles of Whale, who saw his goals against average balloon by more than a goal per game in the second half of the season. The result was a 1–11–3 run that dropped the Wildcats towards the bottom of the standings and knocked them outside the bubble.

At the end of February, Whale was felled by an injury when he was landed on by a teammate. DiMatteo finished off the game and was then called upon to start for the remainder of the season. The first thing he did was stave off #2 Boston College, losing 1–1 in a shootout, and then backstop the Wildcats to two wins over Massachusetts Lowell, the team's only conference sweep of the season.

The sudden shift in the team's fortunes brought a bit of hope back for the program, particularly since they were set to play Lowell in the first round of the conference tournament. While UNH would still have to make some noise in the Hockey East playoffs, the fact that the conference had the best ranking in the nation was born out in New Hampshire's #18 position despite possessing a losing record. Their first round match started off well with UNH finishing the first period with a 2–1 lead. However, the offense was only able to fire 13 shots over the next two periods. Lowell, on the other hand, assailed the Wildcat net bombarding DiMatteo with 29 attempts. He did well to stop most of the shots, including several on two power plays, but did end up surrendering the tying goal. UNH was able to limp into overtime but the momentum remained firmly with the River Hawks. Lowell scored the winning goal on their 42nd shot of the night, ending a dismal season for the Wildcats.

== Departures ==
Player	Position	Nationality	Cause
Harrison Blaisdell	Forward	United Kingdom	Graduation (signed with Fort Wayne Komets)
Nicholas Cafarelli	Forward	United States	Graduate transfer to RIT
Jeremy Forman	Goaltender	United States	Graduate transfer to UNLV
Cameron Gendron	Forward	United States	Graduate transfer to Providence
Jakob Hellsten	Goaltender	Sweden	Signed professional contract (Leksands IF)
Tyler Muszelik	Goaltender	United States	Transferred to Connecticut
Stiven Sardaryan	Forward	Russia	Transferred to Michigan Tech

== Recruiting ==
Player	Position	Nationality	Age	Notes
Rico DiMatteo	Goaltender	United States	23	Brasher Falls, NY; graduate transfer from Long Island
Connor MacPherson	Forward	Canada	19	Windsor, ON
Ryan MacPherson	Forward	Canada	19	Windsor, ON; selected 172nd overall in 2023
Josh Player	Defenseman	United States	19	Thorofare, NJ
Jared Whale	Goaltender	Canada	21	Calgary, AB; transfer from Alaska Anchorage

== Roster ==
As of August 24, 2024.

No.	Nat.	Player	Class	Pos	Height	Weight	DoB	Hometown	Previous team	NHL rights
2	(United States)	Jack Babbage	Senior	D	6' 1" (1.85 m)	185 lb (84 kg)	2000-08-30	Tully, New York	Quinnipiac (ECAC)	—
3	(United States)	Conor Lovett	Senior	F	5' 11" (1.8 m)	200 lb (91 kg)	2001-04-07	Franklin, Massachusetts	Cedar Rapids RoughRiders (USHL)	—
5	(United States)	Zach Hahn	Sophomore	D	6' 2" (1.88 m)	205 lb (93 kg)	2002-08-06	Huntington, New York	P.A.L. Jr. Islanders (NCDC)	—
6	(Latvia)	Marty Laviņš	Sophomore	F	6' 1" (1.85 m)	185 lb (84 kg)	2003-04-10	Riga, Latvia	Cedar Rapids RoughRiders (USHL)	—
7	(Canada)	Ryan MacPherson	Freshman	F	6' 1" (1.85 m)	185 lb (84 kg)	2005-03-02	Windsor, Ontario	Penticton Vees (BCHL)	PHI, 172nd overall 2023
8	(United States)	Nikolai Jenson (A)	Graduate	D	5' 11" (1.8 m)	193 lb (88 kg)	2000-07-28	Cold Spring, Minnesota	Youngstown Phantoms (USHL)	—
9	(United States)	Connor Sweeney (A)	Senior	F	6' 2" (1.88 m)	200 lb (91 kg)	2000-05-05	North Andover, Massachusetts	Islanders Hockey Club (NCDC)	—
10	(United States)	Ronan Walsh	Sophomore	F	6' 4" (1.93 m)	210 lb (95 kg)	2002-05-03	Andover, New Hampshire	Amarillo Wranglers (NAHL)	—
12	(United States)	Liam Devlin	Senior	F	5' 11" (1.8 m)	192 lb (87 kg)	2001-01-07	Needham, Massachusetts	Omaha Lancers (USHL)	—
13	(United States)	Josh Player	Freshman	D	6' 0" (1.83 m)	190 lb (86 kg)	2005-05-13	Thorofare, New Jersey	Green Bay Gamblers (USHL)	—
15	(Austria)	Luis Lindner	Senior	D	5' 11" (1.8 m)	170 lb (77 kg)	2001-05-16	Spittal an der Drau, Austria	American International (AHA)	—
16	(Canada)	Luke Reid	Graduate	D	6' 0" (1.83 m)	192 lb (87 kg)	2001-09-26	Warman, Saskatchewan	Chicago Steel (USHL)	NSH, 166th overall 2020
17	(Latvia)	Kristaps Skrastiņš	Junior	F	5' 10" (1.78 m)	180 lb (82 kg)	2001-11-20	Grobiņa, Latvia	Amarillo Wranglers (NAHL)	—
19	(United States)	Brendan Fitzgerald	Sophomore	D	6' 0" (1.83 m)	165 lb (75 kg)	2003-03-06	North Reading, Massachusetts	Cedar Rapids RoughRiders (USHL)	—
20	(United States)	Colton Huard	Senior	D	6' 3" (1.91 m)	200 lb (91 kg)	2000-11-27	Foothill Ranch, California	Chicago Steel (USHL)	—
22	(United States)	J. P. Turner	Sophomore	F	6' 0" (1.83 m)	195 lb (88 kg)	2003-01-31	East Falmouth, Massachusetts	Fargo Force (USHL)	—
23	(United States)	Jason Siedem	Sophomore	F	5' 10" (1.78 m)	185 lb (84 kg)	2002-10-17	Madison, New Jersey	Blackfalds Bulldogs (AJHL)	—
24	(United States)	Robert Cronin	Senior	F	5' 10" (1.78 m)	187 lb (85 kg)	2000-08-15	Plymouth, Massachusetts	Dubuque Fighting Saints (USHL)	—
25	(United States)	Nick Ring	Sophomore	F	5' 10" (1.78 m)	180 lb (82 kg)	2003-10-26	Abington, Massachusetts	Sioux Falls Stampede (USHL)	—
26	(United States)	Morgan Winters	Junior	F	5' 11" (1.8 m)	165 lb (75 kg)	2001-12-08	Osprey, Florida	Omaha Lancers (USHL)	—
27	(Canada)	Connor MacPherson	Freshman	F	6' 0" (1.83 m)	176 lb (80 kg)	2005-03-02	Windsor, Ontario	Penticton Vees (BCHL)	—
28	(United States)	Alex Gagne (C)	Senior	D	6' 4" (1.93 m)	207 lb (94 kg)	2002-08-12	Bedford, New Hampshire	Muskegon Lumberjacks (USHL)	TBL, 192nd overall 2021
29	(United States)	Cy LeClerc	Junior	F	5' 9" (1.75 m)	180 lb (82 kg)	2002-08-17	Brentwood, New Hampshire	Janesville Jets (NAHL)	—
30	(United States)	Rico DiMatteo	Senior (RS)	G	6' 3" (1.91 m)	161 lb (73 kg)	2001-01-01	Brasher Falls, New York	Long Island (NCAA)	—
35	(United States)	Rafe Gaughan	Graduate	G	6' 1" (1.85 m)	185 lb (84 kg)	2000-02-11	Somersworth, New Hampshire	Northeast Generals (NA3HL)	—
36	(United States)	Ryan Conmy	Sophomore	F	5' 10" (1.78 m)	190 lb (86 kg)	2004-10-23	Alexandria, Virginia	Sioux City Musketeers (USHL)	LAK, 182nd overall 2023
41	(Canada)	Jared Whale	Junior	G	5' 11" (1.8 m)	195 lb (88 kg)	2002-11-01	Calgary, Alberta	Alaska Anchorage (NCAA)	—

== Standings ==
2024–25 Hockey East Standings
	Conference record										Overall record					
	GP	W	L	T	OTW	OTL	SW	PTS	GF	GA	GP	W	L	T	GF	GA
#4 Boston College †	24	18	4	2	2	0	1	55	82	40	37	27	8	2	125	65
#8 Maine *	24	13	5	6	1	1	5	50	67	45	38	24	8	6	124	75
#2 Boston University	24	14	8	2	1	1	2	46	89	65	40	24	14	2	150	119
#7 Connecticut	24	12	8	4	3	2	1	40	76	65	39	23	12	4	130	97
#13 Providence	24	11	8	5	2	2	1	39	65	67	37	21	11	5	103	96
#10 Massachusetts	24	10	9	5	0	0	2	37	69	58	40	21	14	5	133	97
Massachusetts Lowell	24	8	13	3	0	1	2	30	57	69	36	16	16	4	93	101
Merrimack	24	9	14	1	1	0	1	28	57	81	35	13	21	1	81	112
Northeastern	24	7	14	3	1	1	2	26	48	71	37	14	20	3	88	112
New Hampshire	24	5	14	5	0	2	1	23	53	73	35	13	16	6	96	100
Vermont	24	6	16	2	2	3	1	22	59	88	35	11	21	3	100	116
Championship: March 21, 2025 † indicates regular season champion * indicates conference tournament champion (Lamoriello Trophy); Rankings: USCHO Division I Men's Poll

== Schedule and results ==
Date	Time	Opponent^{#}	Rank^{#}	Site	TV	Decision	Result	Attendance	Record
Exhibition
October 5	1:00 pm	Stonehill*		Whittemore Center • Durham, New Hampshire (Exhibition)	ESPN+	Whale	W 4–1	3,139	
Regular Season
October 12	7:00 pm	Bentley*		Whittemore Center • Durham, New Hampshire	ESPN+	Whale	W 2–1 ^{OT}	4,372	1–0–0
October 18	7:00 pm	at Merrimack		J. Thom Lawler Rink • North Andover, Massachusetts	ESPN+	Whale	T 0–0 ^{SOL}	2,476	1–0–1 (0–0–1)
October 25	7:00 pm	at #11 Quinnipiac*		M&T Bank Arena • Hamden, Connecticut	ESPN+, NESN	Whale	L 2–8	3,402	1–1–1
October 26	4:00 pm	at #11 Quinnipiac*		M&T Bank Arena • Hamden, Connecticut	ESPN+	Whale	W 3–2	3,541	2–1–1
November 1	7:00 pm	at #12 Providence		Schneider Arena • Providence, Rhode Island	ESPN+, NESN	Whale	L 3–6	2,029	2–2–1 (0–1–1)
November 2	4:30 pm	#12 Providence		Whittemore Center • Durham, New Hampshire	ESPN+, NESN	Whale	L 0–3	4,857	2–3–1 (0–2–1)
November 9	7:00 pm	Long Island*		Whittemore Center • Durham, New Hampshire	ESPN+	Whale	W 6–1	4,162	3–3–1
November 15	7:00 pm	Northeastern		Whittemore Center • Durham, New Hampshire	ESPN+, NESN	Whale	W 4–1	5,937	4–3–1 (1–2–1)
November 16	7:00 pm	at Northeastern		Matthews Arena • Boston, Massachusetts	ESPN+	Whale	T 1–1 ^{SOL}	2,654	4–3–2 (1–2–2)
November 22	7:00 pm	#5т Maine		Whittemore Center • Durham, New Hampshire (Rivalry)	ESPN+, NESN	Whale	L 1–3	6,501	4–4–2 (1–3–2)
November 29	7:00 pm	RIT*		Whittemore Center • Durham, New Hampshire	ESPN+	Whale	W 5–1	3,717	5–4–2
November 30	7:00 pm	RIT*		Whittemore Center • Durham, New Hampshire	ESPN+	Whale	W 6–1	3,619	6–4–2
December 6	7:00 pm	at Northeastern		Matthews Arena • Boston, Massachusetts	ESPN+	Whale	W 5–3	2,276	7–4–2 (2–3–2)
December 13	7:00 pm	at #17 Dartmouth*		Thompson Arena • Hanover, New Hampshire (Rivalry)	ESPN+	Whale	T 3–3 ^{SOW}	2,768	7–4–3
December 14	7:30 pm	USNTDP*		Whittemore Center • Durham, New Hampshire (Exhibition)	ESPN+	DiMatteo	W 6–2	3,441	
December 28	3:00 pm	at Rensselaer*		Houston Field House • Troy, New York	ESPN+	Whale	W 7–4	2,138	8–4–3
January 3	7:00 pm	at Princeton*		Hobey Baker Memorial Rink • Princeton, New Jersey	ESPN+	Whale	W 3–0	2,020	9–4–3
January 4	4:00 pm	at Princeton*		Hobey Baker Memorial Rink • Princeton, New Jersey	ESPN+	Whale	W 4–3	2,057	10–4–3
January 10	7:00 pm	Connecticut	#17	Whittemore Center • Durham, New Hampshire	ESPN+	Whale	L 1–4	5,491	10–5–3 (2–4–2)
January 11	4:00 pm	at Connecticut	#17	Toscano Family Ice Forum • Storrs, Connecticut	ESPN+	Whale	L 2–3	2,691	10–6–3 (2–5–2)
January 17	7:00 pm	#11 Boston University	#19	Whittemore Center • Durham, New Hampshire	ESPN+, NESN	Whale	L 3–6	5,653	10–7–3 (2–6–2)
January 18	7:00 pm	at #11 Boston University	#19	Agganis Arena • Boston, Massachusetts	ESPN+	Whale	L 1–2 ^{OT}	5,717	10–8–3 (2–7–2)
January 24	7:00 pm	Vermont	#18	Whittemore Center • Durham, New Hampshire	ESPN+	Whale	L 2–3	4,705	10–9–3 (2–8–2)
January 25	7:00 pm	Vermont	#18	Whittemore Center • Durham, New Hampshire	ESPN+	Whale	W 5–2	5,873	11–9–3 (3–8–2)
January 31	7:00 pm	at #10 Boston University	#18	Agganis Arena • Boston, Massachusetts	ESPN+	Whale	L 2–7	4,483	11–10–3 (3–9–2)
February 7	7:00 pm	#1 Boston College		Whittemore Center • Durham, New Hampshire	ESPN+, NESN	Whale	L 2–4	6,501	11–11–3 (3–10–2)
February 8	7:00 pm	Merrimack		Whittemore Center • Durham, New Hampshire	ESPN+, NESN	Whale	L 4–5	4,989	11–12–3 (3–11–2)
February 14	7:00 pm	at #5 Maine		Alfond Arena • Orono, Maine (Rivalry)	ESPN+	Whale	T 1–1 ^{SOL}	5,043	11–12–4 (3–11–3)
February 15	7:00 pm	at #5 Maine		Alfond Arena • Orono, Maine (Rivalry)	ESPN+, NESN	Whale	L 2–5	5,043	11–13–4 (3–12–3)
February 21	7:00 pm	#16 Massachusetts		Whittemore Center • Durham, New Hampshire	ESPN+	Whale	T 3–3 ^{SOW}	5,726	11–13–5 (3–12–4)
February 22	6:00 pm	at #16 Massachusetts		Mullins Center • Amherst, Massachusetts	ESPN+	Whale	L 1–3	6,144	11–14–5 (3–13–4)
February 28	7:00 pm	at #1 Boston College		Conte Forum • Chestnut Hill, Massachusetts	ESPN+	Whale	L 1–4	7,007	11–15–5 (3–14–4)
March 1	7:00 pm	#1 Boston College		Whittemore Center • Durham, New Hampshire	ESPN+	DiMatteo	T 1–1 ^{SOL}	6,501	11–15–6 (3–14–5)
March 7	7:00 pm	at #17 Massachusetts Lowell		Tsongas Center • Lowell, Massachusetts	ESPN+, NESN+	DiMatteo	W 4–1	5,291	12–15–6 (4–14–5)
March 8	7:00 pm	at #17 Massachusetts Lowell		Whittemore Center • Durham, New Hampshire	ESPN+	DiMatteo	W 4–2	6,501	13–15–6 (5–14–5)
Hockey East Tournament
March 12	7:05 pm	at #19 Massachusetts Lowell*		Tsongas Center • Lowell, Massachusetts (Hockey East Opening Round)	ESPN+	DiMatteo	L 2–3 ^{OT}	2,995	13–16–6
*Non-conference game. ^{#}Rankings from USCHO.com Poll. All times are in Eastern Time. Source:

== Scoring statistics ==
Name	Position	Games	Goals	Assists	Points	PIM
Ryan Conmy	RW	34	15	18	33	6
Robert Cronin	F	35	17	11	28	20
Cy LeClerc	F	33	8	20	28	12
Liam Devlin	F	35	9	14	23	40
Nick Ring	F	35	9	11	20	4
Marty Laviņš	C	35	8	9	17	34
Alex Gagne	D	35	4	13	17	46
Morgan Winters	F	26	2	12	14	8
J. P. Turner	C	35	5	8	13	22
Luke Reid	D	35	1	11	12	10
Jason Siedem	F	32	3	8	11	4
Colton Huard	D	35	0	10	10	22
Connor Sweeney	F	35	2	6	8	8
Conor Lovett	F	35	5	1	6	10
Kristaps Skrastiņš	C	32	3	3	6	4
Nikolai Jenson	D	28	2	4	6	33
Luis Lindner	D/F	28	0	6	6	4
Brendan Fitzgerald	D	33	1	2	3	24
Ryan MacPherson	C	18	1	1	2	2
Jack Babbage	D	20	1	0	1	6
Zach Hahn	D	2	0	0	0	0
Connor MacPherson	RW	5	0	0	0	0
Josh Player	D	13	0	0	0	2
Ronan Walsh	F	15	0	0	0	15
Rico DiMatteo	G	8	0	0	0	0
Jared Whale	G	31	0	0	0	0
Bench	–	–	–	–	–	4
Total			99	183	282	383

== Goaltending statistics ==
Name	Games	Minutes	Wins	Losses	Ties	Goals against	Saves	Shut outs	SV %	GAA
Rico DiMatteo	8	355:25	2	1	1	15	153	0	.911	2.53
Jared Whale	31	1770:39	11	15	5	79	624	2	.888	2.68
Empty Net	-	15:20	-	-	-	6	-	-	-	-
Total	35	2141:24	13	16	6	100	777	2	.886	2.80

== Rankings ==
Poll	Week																											
Poll	Pre	1	2	3	4	5	6	7	8	9	10	11	12	13	14	15	16	17	18	19	20	21	22	23	24	25	26	27 (Final)
USCHO.com	RV	NR	NR	NR	NR	NR	NR	NR	NR	NR	NR	RV	-	RV	17	19	18	18	RV	RV	RV	RV	RV	RV	NR	NR	-	NR
USA Hockey	RV	NR	NR	NR	NR	NR	NR	NR	NR	NR	NR	RV	-	20	16	18	18	16	19	RV	RV	RV	RV	RV	NR	NR	NR	NR

Note: USCHO did not release a poll in week 12 or 26.
Note: USA Hockey did not release a poll in week 12.

== Awards and honors ==
Player	Award	Ref
Alex Gagne	All-Hockey East Third Team	
