= Michael Souza =

Italian-American ice hockey player (born 1978)

- Born: January 28, 1978 (age 48) Wakefield, Massachusetts, U.S.
- Height: 6 ft 1 in (185 cm)
- Weight: 210 lb (95 kg; 15 st 0 lb)
- Position: Forward
- Shot: Left
- Played for: Norfolk Admirals; Bridgeport Sound Tigers; Portland Pirates; Hershey Bears; EHC Basel; Kölner Haie; SG Cortina; HC Bolzano
- National team: Italy
- NHL draft: 67th overall, 1997; Chicago Blackhawks
- Playing career: 2000–2011
- Coaching career

Current position
- Title: Head coach
- Team: New Hampshire
- Conference: Hockey East

Biographical details
- Education: New Hampshire

Coaching career (HC unless noted)
- 2011–2013: Brown (assistant)
- 2013–2015: UConn (assistant)
- 2015–2018: New Hampshire (assistant)
- 2018–present: New Hampshire

Head coaching record
- Overall: 91–118–27 (.443)

Michael Souza (born January 28, 1978) often referred to as Mike Souza, is a former Italian-American professional ice hockey forward who currently is the head coach of the University of New Hampshire men's ice hockey team.

== Playing career ==
Souza was born in Wakefield, Massachusetts. Souza attended the University of New Hampshire from 1996 to 2000. He is a cousin of fellow UNH player Paul Thompson. In 1997 Souza was drafted 67th overall by the Chicago Blackhawks in the 1997 NHL entry draft. At UNH, Souza was noted for his speed and skating skill. In 1999 UNH reached the championship game of the 1999 NCAA Division I Men's Ice Hockey Tournament. In the championship game Souza scored a key goal in the third period to force overtime. Maine won in overtime, however. In 2000 Souza was a member of the Hockey East All Star team.

After leaving UNH he played in the AHL for three seasons with the Norfolk Admirals and the Bridgeport Sound Tigers. In 2001 and 2002 he attended the Chicago Blackhawks' training camp. The next two seasons Souza split his time between the ECHL and the AHL, playing for the Florence Pride and Reading Royals of the ECHL, and the Portland Pirates, Bridgeport Sound Tigers, and Hershey Bears of the AHL.

In 2005 Souza began to play in Europe. In the 2005–06 season Souza played for the Kölner Haie of the Deutsche Eishockey Liga, EHC Basel of the Swiss National League A, and EHC Olten of the Swiss National League B. In 2006, he moved to Italy to play in the Serie A. He played with SG Cortina for four seasons before moving to the Bolzano-Bozen Foxes in 2010.

== International career ==
By playing in Italy, Souza later gained Italian citizenship and participated at the 2009 and 2010 IIHF World Championship as a member of the Italy men's national ice hockey team.

== Coaching career ==
Souza retired in 2011 and became an assistant ice hockey coach with Brown University. In 2013, he became an assistant coach with the University of Connecticut, and in 2015 he joined the staff at the University of New Hampshire. On March 14, 2018, Souza officially took over as the head coach of the Wildcats, replacing the retiring Dick Umile.

== Career statistics ==
			Regular season					Playoffs
Season	Team	League	GP	G	A	Pts	PIM	GP	G	A	Pts	PIM
1996–97	U. of New Hampshire	HE	39	15	11	26	20	—	—	—	—	—
1997–98	U. of New Hampshire	HE	38	13	12	25	36	—	—	—	—	—
1998–99	U. of New Hampshire	HE	41	23	42	65	38	—	—	—	—	—
1999–00	U. of New Hampshire	HE	38	15	25	40	58	—	—	—	—	—
2000–01	Norfolk Admirals	AHL	75	14	17	31	44	3	0	0	0	2
2001–02	Norfolk Admirals	AHL	66	20	11	31	58	—	—	—	—	—
2002–03	Norfolk Admirals	AHL	5	2	2	4	7	—	—	—	—	—
2002–03	Bridgeport Sound Tigers	AHL	59	7	15	22	89	9	0	1	1	12
2003–04	Florence Pride	ECHL	17	8	13	21	29	—	—	—	—	—
2003–04	Portland Pirates	AHL	27	5	5	10	16	—	—	—	—	—
2003–04	Bridgeport Sound Tigers	AHL	14	4	1	5	22	—	—	—	—	—
2004–05	Reading Royals	ECHL	12	6	3	9	20	—	—	—	—	—
2004–05	Hershey Bears	AHL	53	14	8	22	36	—	—	—	—	—
2005–06	Kölner Haie	DEL	5	0	1	1	6	9	1	1	2	14
2005–06	EHC Basel	NLA	3	1	0	1	4	—	—	—	—	—
2005–06	EHC Olten	NLB	23	16	18	34	38	—	—	—	—	—
2006–07	SG Cortina	Serie A	31	22	31	53	32	8	5	5	10	12
2007–08	SG Cortina	Serie A	31	13	15	28	32	—	—	—	—	—
2008–09	SG Cortina	Serie A	42	23	20	43	34	—	—	—	—	—
2009–10	SG Cortina	Serie A	28	6	11	17	12	—	—	—	—	—
Serie A totals			132	64	77	141	110	8	5	5	10	12

== Awards and honors ==
Award	Year
All-Hockey East Rookie Team	1996–97
All-NCAA All-Tournament Team	1999
All-Hockey East Second Team	1999–00

== Head coaching record ==
Record table
Season	Team	Overall	Conference	Standing	Postseason
New Hampshire Wildcats (Hockey East) (2018–present)
2018–19	New Hampshire	12–15–9	8–10–6	8th	Hockey East Quarterfinals
2019–20	New Hampshire	15–15–4	9–12–3	9th	
2020–21	New Hampshire	6–14–3	5–13–3	10th	Hockey East Quarterfinals
2021–22	New Hampshire	14–19–1	8–15–1	9th	Hockey East Opening Round
2022–23	New Hampshire	11–21–3	6–15–3	10th	Hockey East Opening Round
2023–24	New Hampshire	20–15–1	12–11–1	T–5th	Hockey East Quarterfinals
2024–25	New Hampshire	13–16–6	5–14–5	10th	Hockey East Opening Round
New Hampshire:		91–118–27	53–90–22		
Total:		91–118–27 (.443)			
National champion Postseason invitational champion Conference regular season champion Conference regular season and conference tournament champion Division regular season champion Division regular season and conference tournament champion Conference tournament champion
