= Jack Williams (ice hockey) =

American ice hockey player (born 2002)

- Born: March 2, 2002 (age 24) Biddeford, Maine, U.S.
- Height: 5 ft 11 in (180 cm)
- Weight: 185 lb (84 kg; 13 st 3 lb)
- Position: Center
- Shoots: Right
- NHL team: Columbus Blue Jackets
- NHL draft: Undrafted
- Playing career: 2025–present

Jack Williams (born March 2, 2002) is an American professional ice hockey center for the Columbus Blue Jackets of the National Hockey League (NHL).

== Playing career ==
Williams played at the collegiate level at Northeastern University, where he served as captain, having previously played major junior with the Muskegon Lumberjacks of the United States Hockey League (USHL). He signed a two-year, entry-level contract with the Blue Jackets on March 25, 2025.

== Career statistics ==
=== Regular season and playoffs ===
			Regular season					Playoffs
Season	Team	League	GP	G	A	Pts	PIM	GP	G	A	Pts	PIM
2018–19	U.S. National Development Team	USHL	2	0	0	0	0	—	—	—	—	—
2018–19	Muskegon Lumberjacks	USHL	9	3	3	6	2	8	2	1	3	0
2019–20	Muskegon Lumberjacks	USHL	44	6	7	13	6	—	—	—	—	—
2020–21	Muskegon Lumberjacks	USHL	52	18	20	38	30	4	0	2	2	0
2021–22	Muskegon Lumberjacks	USHL	58	18	41	59	22	9	4	7	11	2
2022–23	Northeastern University	HE	35	6	11	17	4	—	—	—	—	—
2023–24	Northeastern University	HE	34	17	19	36	8	—	—	—	—	—
2024–25	Northeastern University	HE	37	16	25	41	25	—	—	—	—	—
2024–25	Columbus Blue Jackets	NHL	1	0	0	0	0	—	—	—	—	—
2025–26	Cleveland Monsters	AHL	72	15	23	38	14	9	1	4	5	2
NHL totals			1	0	0	0	0	—	—	—	—	—

=== International ===
Year	Team	Event	Result	GP	G	A	Pts	PIM
2019	United States	HG18	6th	4	1	0	1	0
Junior totals				4	1	0	1	0
