= 2020–21 Vermont Catamounts men's ice hockey season =

Salaam Alaikum iamhere Shah Ali

- Conference: 11th Hockey East
- Home ice: Gutterson Fieldhouse

Rankings
- USCHO: NR
- USA Today: NR

Record
- Overall: 1–10–2
- Conference: 1–9–2
- Home: 1–6–1
- Road: 0–4–1
- Neutral: 0–0–0

Coaches and captains
- Head coach: Todd Woodcroft
- Assistant coaches: Jeff Hill; Steve Wiedler; Mark Stuart
- Captain: Andrew Lucas
- Alternate captain(s): Alex Esposito; Owen Grant; Bryce Misley

The 2020–21 Vermont Catamounts men's ice hockey season was the 65th season of play for the program, the 48th at the Division I level, and the 16th season in the Hockey East conference. The Catamounts represented the University of Vermont and were coached by Todd Woodcroft, in his 1st season.

== Season ==
As a result of the ongoing COVID-19 pandemic the entire college ice hockey season was delayed. Because the NCAA had previously announced that all winter sports athletes would retain whatever eligibility they possessed through at least the following year, none of Vermont's players would lose a season of play. However, the NCAA also approved a change in its transfer regulations that would allow players to transfer and play immediately rather than having to sit out a season, as the rules previously required.

Vermont's first season under Todd Woodcroft could hardly have gone worse. Aside from the problems caused by the pandemic, the team's offense was nearly invisible for most of the year. The Catamounts only once scored more than 3 goals (their only win on the season), and were shut out on three separate occasions, a little less than a quarter of their games. One silver lining was that most of the teams they faces were ranked and Vermont is in the process of rebuilding after an abysmal season the year before.

Azzaro Tinling and Whim Stålberg sat out the season.

== Departures ==
Player	Position	Nationality	Cause
Matt Alvaro	Forward	Canada	Graduation (Signed with Orlando Solar Bears)
Tom Beretta	Forward	Canada	Graduation (Signed with Norfolk Admirals)
Joey Cipollone	Forward	United States	Transferred to Quinnipiac
Johnny DeRoche	Forward	United States	Transferred to Northeastern
Max Kaufman	Forward	United States	Transferred to Boston University
Stefanos Lekkas	Goaltender	United States	Graduation (Signed with Fort Wayne Komets)
Derek Lodermeier	Forward	United States	Graduation (Signed with Jacksonville Icemen)
Riley McCutcheon	Forward	Canada	Left program
Corey Moriarty	Defenseman	United States	Graduation
Matthew O'Donnell	Defenseman	United States	Graduation

== Recruiting ==
Player	Position	Nationality	Age	Notes
Mickey Burns	Forward	United States	20	Wayne, NJ
Gabe Carriere	Goaltender	United States	19	Orleans, ON
Noah Jordan	Forward	Canada	23	Toronto, ON; transfer from Miami
Jordan Kaplan	Forward	United States	23	Bridgewater, NJ; transfer from Sacred Heart
Tristan Mullin	Forward	Canada	23	Cartwright, MB; transfer from Cornell
Cody Schiavon	Defenseman	Canada	20	West Kelowna, BC
Whim Stålberg	Forward	Sweden	21	Gothenburg, SWE
Azzaro Tinling	Forward	Canada	20	Pointe-Claire, QC
Dovar Tinling	Forward	Canada	17	Pointe-Claire, QC
Ray Vītoliņš	Forward	Latvia	18	Ogre, LAT
Will Zapernick	Forward	Canada	20	Edmonton, AB

== Roster ==
As of February 12, 2021.

No.	Nat.	Player	Class	Pos	Height	Weight	DoB	Hometown	Previous team	NHL rights
1	(United States)	Tyler Harmon	Senior	G	6' 2" (1.88 m)	205 lb (93 kg)	1997-10-17	Ramsey, New Jersey	Jersey Hitmen (USPHL)	—
2	(United States)	Carter Long	Junior	D	6' 3" (1.91 m)	220 lb (100 kg)	1998-02-13	Yorktown, Virginia	Lincoln Stars (USHL)	—
3	(United States)	Andrew Petrillo	Junior	D	5' 10" (1.78 m)	190 lb (86 kg)	1998-03-12	Pompton Plains, New Jersey	Central Illinois Flying Aces (USHL)	—
4	(Canada)	Owen Grant (A)	Senior	D	5' 11" (1.8 m)	185 lb (84 kg)	1998-01-22	Ottawa, Ontario	Carleton Place Canadians (CCHL)	—
5	(United States)	Christian Evers	Senior	D	6' 2" (1.88 m)	200 lb (91 kg)	1997-05-25	Waukee, Iowa	Lincoln Stars (USHL)	—
6	(United States)	Andrew Lucas (C)	Sophomore	D	5' 11" (1.8 m)	160 lb (73 kg)	1999-02-05	Alexandria, Virginia	Brooks Bandits (AJHL)	—
7	(Canada)	Simon Boyko	Sophomore	F	5' 10" (1.78 m)	175 lb (79 kg)	1999-04-04	Mississauga, Ontario	Brooks Bandits (AJHL)	—
9	(Canada)	Bryce Misley (A)	Senior	F	6' 1" (1.85 m)	195 lb (88 kg)	1999-09-05	Toronto, Ontario	Oakville Blades (OJHL)	MIN, 116th overall 2017
10	(Russia)	Vlad Dzhioshvili	Senior	F	6' 0" (1.83 m)	190 lb (86 kg)	1998-01-06	Moscow, Russia	Bloomington Thunder (USHL)	—
11	(Sweden)	Whim Stålberg	Freshman	F	6' 5" (1.96 m)	215 lb (98 kg)	1999-06-14	Gothenburg, Sweden	Jersey Hitmen (NCDC)	—
12	(Canada)	Nic Hamre	Junior	F	5' 8" (1.73 m)	180 lb (82 kg)	1997-04-25	Cumberland, Ontario	Brooks Bandits (AJHL)	—
14	(United States)	Ace Cowans	Senior	F	5' 8" (1.73 m)	170 lb (77 kg)	1996-09-18	Beverly, Massachusetts	Waterloo Black Hawks (USHL)	—
16	(Canada)	Will Zapernick	Freshman	F	5' 9" (1.75 m)	180 lb (82 kg)	1999-11-16	Edmonton, Alberta	Sherwood Park Crusaders (AJHL)	—
17	(United States)	Jacques Bouquot	Sophomore	F	6' 0" (1.83 m)	180 lb (82 kg)	2000-02-10	South Windsor, Connecticut	Chilliwack Chiefs (BCHL)	—
18	(Canada)	Azzaro Tinling	Freshman	F	6' 1" (1.85 m)	220 lb (100 kg)	1999-12-20	Pointe-Claire, Quebec	Hawkesbury Hawks (CCHL)	—
20	(Canada)	Cody Schiavon	Freshman	D	6' 0" (1.83 m)	201 lb (91 kg)	2000-07-01	West Kelowna, British Columbia	Trail Smoke Eaters (BCHL)	—
21	(Canada)	Tristan Mullin	Senior	F	6' 2" (1.88 m)	196 lb (89 kg)	1996-10-09	Cartwright, Manitoba	Cornell (ECAC)	—
22	(United States)	Alex Esposito (A)	Senior	F	6' 0" (1.83 m)	185 lb (84 kg)	1996-06-03	West Haven, Connecticut	Youngstown Phantoms (USHL)	—
23	(Canada)	Noah Jordan	Junior	F	6' 5" (1.96 m)	215 lb (98 kg)	1997-03-08	Toronto, Ontario	Miami (NCHC)	—
24	(United States)	Brian Kelly	Senior	D	6' 0" (1.83 m)	808 lb (367 kg)	1997-12-24	Purchase, New York	Connecticut Jr. Rangers (USPHL)	—
25	(Canada)	Dovar Tinling	Freshman	F	5' 11" (1.8 m)	185 lb (84 kg)	2003-03-03	Pointe-Claire, Quebec	Hawkesbury Hawks (CCHL)	—
26	(Latvia)	Ray Vītoliņš	Freshman	F	6' 0" (1.83 m)	180 lb (82 kg)	2002-01-12	Ogre, Latvia	Sioux Falls Stampede (USHL)	—
27	(Canada)	Cory Thomas	Senior	D	6' 5" (1.96 m)	215 lb (98 kg)	1998-03-19	St. Brieux, Saskatchewan	Flin Flon Bombers (SJHL)	—
28	(Canada)	William Lemay	Sophomore	F	5' 10" (1.78 m)	185 lb (84 kg)	1998-12-28	Marieville, Quebec	Brooks Bandits (AJHL)	—
29	(Canada)	Dallas Comeau	Junior	F	5' 10" (1.78 m)	180 lb (82 kg)	1997-09-19	Calgary, Alberta	Grande Prairie Storm (AJHL)	—
30	(United States)	Matt Beck	Senior	G	5' 11" (1.8 m)	180 lb (82 kg)	1996-10-05	Westport, Connecticut	Philadelphia Jr. Flyers (USPHL)	—
34	(United States)	Mickey Burns	Freshman	F	5' 9" (1.75 m)	170 lb (77 kg)	2000-04-03	Wayne, New Jersey	Jersey Hitmen (NCDC)	—
35	(Canada)	Gabe Carriere	Freshman	G	6' 2" (1.88 m)	185 lb (84 kg)	2000-11-05	Ottawa, Ontario	Waterloo Black Hawks (USHL)	—
37	(United States)	Jordan Kaplan	Junior (RS)	F	5' 10" (1.78 m)	170 lb (77 kg)	1997-05-19	Bridgewater, New Jersey	Sacred Heart (AHA)	—

== Standings ==
2020–21 Hockey East Standings
	Conference record										Overall record					
	GP	W	L	T	OTW	OTL	SOW	HEPI	GF	GA	GP	W	L	T	GF	GA
#6 Boston College	21	16	4	1	3	2	0	58.61	82	46	24	17	6	1	91	58
#11 Boston University	14	10	3	1	3	1	1	56.36	49	37	16	10	5	1	52	45
#1 Massachusetts *	22	13	5	4	1	1	1	55.44	76	42	29	20	5	4	103	48
Connecticut	22	10	10	2	1	4	2	52.01	69	63	23	10	11	2	70	69
#16 Providence	23	10	8	5	0	0	2	50.80	63	61	25	11	9	5	71	67
Northeastern	20	9	8	3	1	0	3	49.94	68	60	21	9	9	3	69	64
#19 Massachusetts–Lowell	16	7	8	1	1	1	0	48.00	46	53	20	10	9	1	59	63
Maine	15	3	10	2	0	1	2	46.66	41	61	16	3	11	2	43	68
Merrimack	18	5	11	2	0	1	0	45.38	47	66	18	5	11	2	47	66
New Hampshire	21	5	13	3	3	2	2	43.66	51	83	23	6	14	3	60	88
Vermont	12	1	9	2	0	0	0	38.02	17	37	13	1	10	2	20	42
Championship: March 20, 2021; No Regular Season Champion Awarded * indicates conference tournament champion (Lamoriello Trophy); Rankings: USCHO.com Top 20 Poll

== Schedule and results ==
Date	Time	Opponent^{#}	Rank^{#}	Site	TV	Decision	Result	Attendance	Record
Regular season
December 19	6:00 PM	at #10 Massachusetts		Mullins Center • Amherst, Massachusetts	NESN	Harmon	L 0–4	0	0–1–0 (0–1–0)
December 20	6:00 PM	at #10 Massachusetts		Mullins Center • Amherst, Massachusetts	NESN	Harmon	L 1–4	0	0–2–0 (0–2–0)
December 26	7:00 PM	vs. #12 Northeastern		Gutterson Fieldhouse • Burlington, Vermont		Harmon	L 1–4	0	0–3–0 (0–3–0)
December 27	7:00 PM	vs. #12 Northeastern		Gutterson Fieldhouse • Burlington, Vermont		Harmon	T 2–2 ^{SOL}	0	0–3–1 (0–3–1)
January 1	1:00 PM	vs. #15 Providence		Schneider Arena • Providence, Rhode Island	NESN	Harmon	T 0–0 ^{SOL}	0	0–3–2 (0–3–2)
January 2	7:00 PM	vs. #15 Providence		Schneider Arena • Providence, Rhode Island	NESN	Harmon	L 1–3	0	0–4–2 (0–4–2)
January 8	1:00 PM	vs. Maine		Gutterson Fieldhouse • Burlington, Vermont		Harmon	W 5–4	0	1–4–2 (1–4–2)
January 9	1:00 PM	vs. Maine		Gutterson Fieldhouse • Burlington, Vermont		Carriere	L 3–4	0	1–5–2 (1–5–2)
February 12	6:00 PM	vs. #13 Boston University		Gutterson Fieldhouse • Burlington, Vermont		Carriere	L 0–1	0	1–6–2 (1–6–2)
February 13	6:00 PM	vs. #13 Boston University		Gutterson Fieldhouse • Burlington, Vermont		Harmon	L 1–5	0	1–7–2 (1–7–2)
February 26	7:00 PM	vs. Massachusetts–Lowell		Gutterson Fieldhouse • Burlington, Vermont		Carriere	L 1–3	0	1–8–2 (1–8–2)
February 27	7:00 PM	vs. Massachusetts–Lowell		Gutterson Fieldhouse • Burlington, Vermont		Carriere	L 2–3	0	1–9–2 (1–9–2)
Hockey East Tournament
March 10	3:00 PM	at Massachusetts–Lowell		Tsongas Center • Lowell, Massachusetts (Opening Round)	NESN	Carriere	L 3–5	0	1–10–2
*Non-conference game. ^{#}Rankings from USCHO.com Poll. All times are in Eastern Time.

== Scoring statistics ==
Name	Position	Games	Goals	Assists	Points	PIM
Christian Evers	D	13	4	3	7	14
Ray Vitolins	F	12	1	5	6	4
Tristan Mullin	F	11	4	1	5	4
Jacques Bouquot	C	12	2	3	5	2
Vlad Dzhioshvili	F	13	1	4	5	18
Andrew Lucas	D/F	13	1	3	4	12
Bryce Misley	C	13	1	2	3	0
Alex Esposito	RW	13	1	2	3	10
Simon Boyko	RW	7	2	0	2	0
Jordan Kaplan	F	9	1	1	2	4
Dovar Tinling	C/LW	12	1	1	2	4
Carter Long	D	13	1	1	2	4
Cody Schiavon	D	3	0	1	1	0
Conner Hutchison	D	6	0	1	1	8
Tyler Harmon	G	10	0	1	1	0
Ace Cowans	C/LW	11	0	1	1	6
Owen Grant	D	13	0	1	1	6
William Lemay	LW	13	0	1	1	0
Matt Beck	G	1	0	0	0	0
Brian Kelly	D	3	0	0	0	0
Dallas Comeau	F	3	0	0	0	2
Noah Jordan	RW	5	0	0	0	0
Mickey Burns	LW	5	0	0	0	0
Gabe Carriere	G	6	0	0	0	0
Andrew Petrillo	D	7	0	0	0	0
Nic Hamre	LW	12	0	0	0	15
Will Zapernick	C/RW	12	0	0	0	4
Cory Thomas	D	13	0	0	0	4
Bench	-	13	-	-	-	6
Total			20	32	52	127

== Goaltending statistics ==
Name	Games	Minutes	Wins	Losses	Ties	Goals against	Saves	Shut outs	SV %	GAA
Matt Beck	1	2	0	0	0	0	1	0	1.000	0.00
Gabe Carriere	6	284	0	5	0	12	147	0	.925	2.53
Tyler Harmon	10	498	1	5	2	28	267	0	.905	3.37
Empty Net	-	6	-	-	-	2	-	-	-	-
Total	13	790	1	10	2	42	415	0	.908	3.19

== Rankings ==
Poll	Week																					
Poll	Pre	1	2	3	4	5	6	7	8	9	10	11	12	13	14	15	16	17	18	19	20	21 (Final)
USCHO.com	NR	NR	NR	NR	NR	NR	NR	NR	NR	NR	NR	NR	NR	NR	NR	NR	NR	NR	NR	NR	-	NR
USA Today	NR	NR	NR	NR	NR	NR	NR	NR	NR	NR	NR	NR	NR	NR	NR	NR	NR	NR	NR	NR	NR	NR

USCHO did not release a poll in week 20.

=== 2021 NHL entry draft ===
Round	Pick	Player	NHL team
3	92	Andrei Buyalsky^{†}	Colorado Avalanche
6	171	Cal Thomas^{†}	Arizona Coyotes

† incoming freshman
