= 2022–23 Vermont Catamounts men's ice hockey season =

College hockey season

- Conference: 11th Hockey East
- Home ice: Gutterson Fieldhouse

Rankings
- USCHO: NR
- USA Today: NR

Record
- Overall: 11–20–5
- Conference: 5–16–3
- Home: 7–11–1
- Road: 4–9–4

Coaches and captains
- Head coach: Todd Woodcroft
- Assistant coaches: Steve Wiedler; Scott Moser; Brendan Bradley
- Captain: Jacques Bouquot
- Alternate captain: Joel Määttä

The 2022–23 Vermont Catamounts men's ice hockey season was the 67th season of play for the program, the 50th at the Division I level, and the 18th in the Hockey East conference. The Catamounts represented the University of Vermont and were coached by Todd Woodcroft, in his 3rd season.

== Season ==
Having spent the past five years wallowing at nor near the bottom of the conference standings, Vermont as hoping for some improvement this season. Unfortunately, what the team ended up getting was more of the same. There were some minimal improvements on the defensive end but that wasn't a problem for the Catamounts in recent years. The program's biggest weakness, its inability to score, remained the primary cause of its failings. While the goal production was slightly better than in 2022, Vermont still averaged under 2 goals per game and were shutout on 7 occasions. The team had some bright spots during the season, including a pair of wins over ranked teams in January, but those were few and far between.

After finishing last in Hockey East for the third time in four years, Vermont rallied to upset Maine in the first round of the playoffs. The team's reprieve was short-lived, however, as they ran into league-leading Boston University in the quarterfinals and their season was ended by a 3–7 loss.

== Departures ==
Player	Position	Nationality	Cause
Cory Babichuk	Defenseman	Canada	Left program (retired)
Dallas Comeau	Forward	Canada	Graduation (retired)
Nic Hamre	Forward	Canada	Graduation (retired)
Tyler Harmon	Goaltender	United States	Graduate transfer to Mercyhurst
Noah Jordan	Forward	Canada	Graduation (retired)
Brian Kelly	Defenseman	United States	Graduation (retired)
Philip Lagunov	Forward	Canada	Graduation (signed with Tucson Roadrunners)
Andrew Lucas	Forward/Defenseman	United States	Transferred to Connecticut
Andrew Petrillo	Defenseman	United States	Graduation (retired)
Cody Schiavon	Defenseman	Canada	Transferred to Canisius
Azzaro Tinling	Forward	Canada	Transferred to UNLV
Raimonds Vītoliņš	Forward	Latvia	Returned to juniors (Green Bay Gamblers)

== Recruiting ==
Player	Position	Nationality	Age	Notes
Oskar Autio	Goaltender	Finland	22	Espoo, FIN; graduate transfer from Penn State
Ralfs Bergmanis	Defenseman	Latvia	20	Liepāja, LAT
Finn Evans	Forward	Canada	23	Toronto, ON; graduate transfer from Princeton
Dawson Good	Forward	Canada	20	Abbotsford, BC
Eric Gotz	Defenseman	United States	24	Hermantown, MN; graduate transfer from Michigan Tech
Xavier Henry	Defenseman	Canada	21	Scarborough, ON
Lucas Jones	Defenseman	Canada	21	Calgary, AB
Massimo Lombardi	Forward	Canada	20	Beaconsfield, QC; joined mid-season
Jens Richards	Forward	United States	19	Detroit Lakes, MN
Thomas Sinclair	Forward	Canada	18	Toronto, ON
Philip Törnqvist	Forward	Sweden	21	Gothenburg, SWE

== Roster ==
As of September 12, 2022.

No.	Nat.	Player	Class	Pos	Height	Weight	DoB	Hometown	Previous team	NHL rights
2	(United States)	Carter Long	Graduate	D	6' 3" (1.91 m)	220 lb (100 kg)	1998-02-13	Yorktown, Virginia	Lincoln Stars (USHL)	—
4	(Canada)	William Lemay	Senior	F	5' 10" (1.78 m)	194 lb (88 kg)	1998-12-28	Marieville, Quebec	Brooks Bandits (AJHL)	—
5	(Canada)	Joe Leahy	Graduate	D	6' 5" (1.96 m)	198 lb (90 kg)	1997-04-29	Waterloo, Ontario	Cornell (ECAC)	—
6	(United States)	Eric Gotz	Graduate	D	5' 10" (1.78 m)	181 lb (82 kg)	1998-04-23	Hermantown, Minnesota	Michigan Tech (CCHA)	—
7	(United States)	Robbie Stucker	Graduate	D	6' 3" (1.91 m)	178 lb (81 kg)	1998-09-30	Saint Paul, Minnesota	Minnesota (Big Ten)	CBJ, 210th overall 2017
9	(Finland)	Joel Määttä (A)	Sophomore	F	6' 2" (1.88 m)	202 lb (92 kg)	2002-07-06	Helsinki, Finland	Sioux City Musketeers (USHL)	—
10	(United States)	Luke Mountain	Sophomore	F	6' 1" (1.85 m)	188 lb (85 kg)	2000-02-25	Woodbury, Minnesota	Maryland Black Bears (NAHL)	—
11	(United States)	Porter Schachle	Sophomore	F	6' 4" (1.93 m)	194 lb (88 kg)	2000-11-22	Wasilla, Alaska	Danbury Jr. Hat Tricks (NAHL)	—
12	(Kazakhstan)	Andrei Buyalsky	Sophomore	F	6' 3" (1.91 m)	179 lb (81 kg)	2000-08-18	Karaganda, Kazakhstan	Dubuque Fighting Saints (USHL)	COL, 92nd overall 2021
13	(Russia)	Timofei Spitserov	Sophomore	F	6' 0" (1.83 m)	176 lb (80 kg)	2002-03-26	Saint Petersburg, Russia	Culver Academies (Midget AAA)	SJS, 210th overall 2020
14	(Canada)	Dawson Good	Freshman	F	6' 1" (1.85 m)	205 lb (93 kg)	2002-04-17	Abbotsford, British Columbia	Chilliwack Chiefs (BCHL)	—
15	(Germany)	Luca Münzenberger	Sophomore	D	6' 2" (1.88 m)	200 lb (91 kg)	2002-11-24	Düsseldorf, Germany	Kölner Haie U20 (DNL)	EDM, 90th overall 2021
16	(Canada)	Will Zapernick	Junior	F	5' 9" (1.75 m)	180 lb (82 kg)	1999-11-16	Edmonton, Alberta	Sherwood Park Crusaders (AJHL)	—
17	(United States)	Jacques Bouquot (C)	Senior	F	6' 1" (1.85 m)	185 lb (84 kg)	2000-02-10	South Windsor, Connecticut	Chilliwack Chiefs (BCHL)	—
18	(Canada)	Massimo Lombardi	Freshman	F	5' 10" (1.78 m)	187 lb (85 kg)	2002-05-18	Beaconsfield, Quebec	Karlskrona J20 (J20 Nationell)	—
19	(Slovakia)	Simon Jellúš	Sophomore	F	6' 2" (1.88 m)	202 lb (92 kg)	2001-01-18	Ilava, Slovakia	Cowichan Valley Capitals (BCHL)	—
20	(United States)	Jesper Tarkiainen	Sophomore	F	6' 0" (1.83 m)	188 lb (85 kg)	2001-10-02	Naperville, Illinois	Jokerit U20 (U20 SM-sarja)	—
21	(Canada)	Finn Evans	Senior	D	6' 4" (1.93 m)	180 lb (82 kg)	1999-08-21	Toronto, Ontario	Princeton (ECAC)	—
22	(Sweden)	Isak Walther	Sophomore	F	6' 3" (1.91 m)	179 lb (81 kg)	2001-08-02	Södertälje, Sweden	Södertälje J20 (J20 Nationell)	NSH, 179th overall 2019
23	(Canada)	Xavier Henry	Freshman	D	6' 5" (1.96 m)	216 lb (98 kg)	2001-03-20	Scarborough, Ontario	Chilliwack Chiefs (BCHL)	—
26	(Canada)	Thomas Sinclair	Freshman	F	6' 3" (1.91 m)	194 lb (88 kg)	2002-12-26	Toronto, Ontario	Fargo Force (USHL)	—
28	(Canada)	Lucas Jones	Freshman	D	6' 4" (1.93 m)	205 lb (93 kg)	2001-02-24	Calgary, Alberta	Fort McMurray Oil Barons (AJHL)	—
29	(United States)	Jens Richards	Freshman	F	6' 2" (1.88 m)	194 lb (88 kg)	2002-12-14	Detroit Lakes, Minnesota	Austin Bruins (NAHL)	—
30	(United States)	Cole Hudson	Sophomore	G	6' 1" (1.85 m)	161 lb (73 kg)	2000-03-13	Tonawanda, New York	Shreveport Mudbugs (NAHL)	—
33	(Sweden)	Philip Törnqvist	Freshman	D	6' 0" (1.83 m)	181 lb (82 kg)	2001-08-24	Gothenburg, Sweden	Wichita Falls Warriors (NAHL)	—
34	(Finland)	Oskar Autio	Senior	G	6' 0" (1.83 m)	173 lb (78 kg)	1999-10-06	Espoo, Finland	Penn State (Big Ten)	—
35	(Canada)	Gabe Carriere	Junior	G	6' 2" (1.88 m)	185 lb (84 kg)	2000-11-05	Ottawa, Ontario	Waterloo Black Hawks (USHL)	—
39	(Latvia)	Ralfs Bergmanis	Freshman	D	5' 10" (1.78 m)	175 lb (79 kg)	2002-03-13	Liepāja, Latvia	Sioux City Musketeers (USHL)	—

== Standings ==
2022–23 Hockey East Standings
	Conference record										Overall record					
	GP	W	L	T	OTW	OTL	SW	PTS	GF	GA	GP	W	L	T	GF	GA
#4 Boston University †*	24	18	6	0	2	2	0	54	99	62	40	29	11	0	154	106
#14 Merrimack	24	16	8	0	2	4	0	50	72	52	38	23	14	1	106	89
#16 Northeastern	24	14	7	3	0	2	2	49	78	45	35	17	13	5	107	82
Connecticut	24	13	9	2	4	2	2	41	78	71	35	20	12	3	113	96
Massachusetts Lowell	24	11	10	3	2	2	3	39	56	54	36	18	15	3	89	82
Maine	24	9	11	4	1	1	1	32	62	65	36	15	16	5	92	94
Providence	24	9	9	6	3	0	2	32	64	60	37	16	14	7	103	87
Boston College	24	8	11	5	0	0	1	30	70	73	36	14	16	6	104	104
Massachusetts	24	7	14	3	1	3	2	28	55	80	35	13	17	5	94	103
New Hampshire	24	6	15	3	2	2	2	23	44	76	35	11	20	3	74	105
Vermont	24	5	16	3	2	1	1	18	36	76	36	11	20	5	69	103
Championship: March 18, 2023 † indicates regular season champion * indicates conference tournament champion (Lamoriello Trophy); Rankings: USCHO.com Top 20 Poll

== Schedule and results ==
Date	Time	Opponent^{#}	Rank^{#}	Site	TV	Decision	Result	Attendance	Record
Regular Season
October 1	7:00 PM	Connecticut		Gutterson Fieldhouse • Burlington, Vermont	ESPN+	Carriere	L 1–4	3,095	0–1–0 (0–1–0)
October 2	4:00 PM	Connecticut		Gutterson Fieldhouse • Burlington, Vermont	ESPN+	Autio	L 1–3	1,918	0–2–0 (0–2–0)
October 7	7:00 PM	at #8 Northeastern		Matthews Arena • Boston, Massachusetts	NESN, ESPN+	Carriere	L 2–5	1,726	0–3–0 (0–3–0)
October 8	7:00 PM	at #8 Northeastern		Matthews Arena • Boston, Massachusetts	ESPN+	Autio	L 0–5	1,692	0–4–0 (0–4–0)
October 22	7:00 PM	Holy Cross*		Gutterson Fieldhouse • Burlington, Vermont	ESPN+	Carriere	W 6–0	3,047	1–4–0
October 28	7:00 PM	at Colgate*		Class of 1965 Arena • Hamilton, New York	ESPN+	Carriere	W 2–1	650	2–4–0
October 29	4:00 PM	at Colgate*		Class of 1965 Arena • Hamilton, New York	ESPN+	Carriere	T 1–1 ^{OT}	803	2–4–1
November 4	7:15 PM	at #17 Massachusetts Lowell		Tsongas Center • Lowell, Massachusetts	ESPN+	Carriere	L 0–4	4,152	2–5–1 (0–5–0)
November 5	6:00 PM	at #17 Massachusetts Lowell		Tsongas Center • Lowell, Massachusetts	ESPN+	Autio	L 0–2	4,390	2–6–1 (0–6–0)
November 11	7:00 PM	New Hampshire		Gutterson Fieldhouse • Burlington, Vermont	ESPN+	Carriere	W 2–1 ^{OT}	3,003	3–6–1 (1–6–0)
November 12	7:00 PM	New Hampshire		Gutterson Fieldhouse • Burlington, Vermont	ESPN+	Carriere	W 2–1	2,753	4–6–1 (2–6–0)
November 18	7:00 PM	at #9 Providence		Schneider Arena • Providence, Rhode Island	ESPN+	Carriere	L 0–4	2,258	4–7–1 (2–7–0)
November 19	7:00 PM	at #9 Providence		Schneider Arena • Providence, Rhode Island	ESPN+	Autio	L 3–4 ^{OT}	2,176	4–8–1 (2–8–0)
November 25	7:00 PM	at Rensselaer*		Houston Field House • Troy, New York	ESPN+	Carriere	W 4–3 ^{OT}	2,316	5–8–1
November 27	4:00 PM	Rensselaer*		Gutterson Fieldhouse • Burlington, Vermont	ESPN+	Carriere	L 1–2	1,861	5–9–1
December 2	7:00 PM	Maine		Gutterson Fieldhouse • Burlington, Vermont	ESPN+	Carriere	L 1–3	2,254	5–10–1 (2–9–0)
December 3	5:00 PM	Maine		Gutterson Fieldhouse • Burlington, Vermont	ESPN+	Carriere	L 1–5	2,613	5–11–1 (2–10–0)
December 11	4:00 PM	Dartmouth*		Gutterson Fieldhouse • Burlington, Vermont	ESPN+	Carriere	W 5–1	2,633	6–11–1
December 30	7:00 PM	Lindenwood*		Gutterson Fieldhouse • Burlington, Vermont	ESPN+	Carriere	W 4–2	2,343	7–11–1
December 31	4:00 PM	Lindenwood*		Gutterson Fieldhouse • Burlington, Vermont	ESPN+	Carriere	L 2–3 ^{OT}	2,057	7–12–1
January 8	2:00 PM	Yale*		Gutterson Fieldhouse • Burlington, Vermont	ESPN+	Autio	T 1–1 ^{OT}	2,328	7–12–2
January 14	7:00 PM	American International*		Gutterson Fieldhouse • Burlington, Vermont	ESPN+	Carriere	L 0–4	2,301	7–13–2
January 20	7:00 PM	at #18 Boston College		Conte Forum • Chestnut Hill, Massachusetts	ESPN+	Carriere	T 1–1 ^{SOW}	5,763	7–13–3 (2–10–1)
January 21	7:00 PM	at #18 Boston College		Conte Forum • Chestnut Hill, Massachusetts	ESPN+	Autio	W 3–2	6,226	8–13–3 (3–10–1)
January 27	7:00 PM	#16 Merrimack		Gutterson Fieldhouse • Burlington, Vermont	ESPN+	Carriere	L 2–4	2,377	8–14–3 (3–11–1)
January 28	7:00 PM	#16 Merrimack		Gutterson Fieldhouse • Burlington, Vermont	ESPN+	Autio	W 2–1	2,745	9–14–3 (4–11–1)
February 5	2:00 PM	Providence		Gutterson Fieldhouse • Burlington, Vermont	ESPN+	Autio	L 1–3	2,435	9–15–3 (4–12–1)
February 10	7:00 PM	at Massachusetts		Mullins Center • Amherst, Massachusetts	ESPN+	Carriere	T 4–4 ^{SOL}	4,314	9–15–4 (4–12–2)
February 11	7:00 PM	at Massachusetts		Mullins Center • Amherst, Massachusetts	NESN, ESPN+	Autio	T 3–3 ^{SOL}	4,320	9–15–5 (4–12–3)
February 18	7:00 PM	#16 Northeastern		Gutterson Fieldhouse • Burlington, Vermont	ESPN+	Carriere	L 0–3	3,069	9–16–5 (4–13–3)
February 24	7:00 PM	#9 Boston University		Gutterson Fieldhouse • Burlington, Vermont	ESPN+	Carriere	L 3–5	2,795	9–17–5 (4–14–3)
February 25	7:30 PM	#9 Boston University		Gutterson Fieldhouse • Burlington, Vermont	ESPN+	Autio	L 0–3	2,799	9–18–5 (4–15–3)
March 2	7:00 PM	at New Hampshire		Whittemore Center • Durham, New Hampshire	ESPN+	Carriere	W 3–2	3,448	10–18–5 (5–15–3)
March 4	7:00 PM	at #16 Merrimack		J. Thom Lawler Rink • North Andover, Massachusetts	ESPN+	Autio	L 1–4	2,017	10–19–5 (5–16–3)
Hockey East Tournament
March 8	7:00 PM	at Maine*		Alfond Arena • Orono, Maine (First Round)	ESPN+	Carriere	W 4–2	3,748	11–19–5
March 11	4:30 PM	at #5 Boston University*		Agganis Arena • Boston, Massachusetts (Quarterfinal)	NESN, ESPN+	Carriere	L 3–7	3,915	11–20–5
*Non-conference game. ^{#}Rankings from USCHO.com Poll. All times are in Eastern Time. Source:

== Scoring statistics ==
Name	Position	Games	Goals	Assists	Points	PIM
Isak Walther	C/W	36	9	10	19	24
Andrei Buyalsky	C	34	5	13	18	6
Jacques Bouquot	C/LW	29	6	10	16	4
Will Zapernick	C/RW	36	6	10	16	31
Robbie Stucker	D	33	3	12	15	21
Eric Gotz	F	36	2	13	15	14
Joel Määttä	C	36	7	7	14	18
William Lemay	LW	30	3	4	7	8
Timofey Spitserov	RW	24	4	2	6	4
Simon Jellúš	C/LW	32	3	3	6	20
Carter Long	D	36	3	3	6	4
Ralfs Bergmanis	D	36	0	6	6	22
Massimo Lombardi	C	17	3	2	5	6
Dawson Good	F	22	3	2	5	6
Porter Schachle	F	34	3	2	5	33
Finn Evans	RW	29	2	3	5	21
Luca Münzenberger	D	28	0	5	5	24
Jens Richards	F	30	3	1	4	6
Thomas Sinclair	C	25	2	2	4	2
Philip Törnqvist	D	32	1	3	4	4
Joe Leahy	C//LW	25	1	2	3	27
Luke Mountain	F	13	0	1	1	2
Xavier Henry	D	18	0	1	1	2
Lucas Jones	D	1	0	0	0	0
Oskar Autio	G	12	0	0	0	0
Gabe Carriere	G	26	0	0	0	0
Total			69	115	184	309

== Goaltending statistics ==
Name	Games	Minutes	Wins	Losses	Ties	Goals against	Saves	Shut outs	SV %	GAA
Gabe Carriere	26	1506:26	9	13	3	67	679	1	.910	2.67
Oskar Autio	12	675:52	2	7	2	31	316	0	.911	2.75
Empty Net	-	13:13	-	-	-	4	-	-	-	-
Total	36	2195:31	11	20	5	102	995	1	.907	2.79

== Rankings ==
Poll	Week																											
Poll	Pre	1	2	3	4	5	6	7	8	9	10	11	12	13	14	15	16	17	18	19	20	21	22	23	24	25	26	27 (Final)
USCHO.com	NR	-	NR	NR	NR	NR	NR	NR	NR	NR	NR	NR	NR	-	NR	NR	NR	NR	NR	NR	NR	NR	NR	NR	NR	NR	-	NR
USA Today	NR	NR	NR	NR	NR	NR	NR	NR	NR	NR	NR	NR	NR	NR	NR	NR	NR	NR	NR	NR	NR	NR	NR	NR	NR	NR	NR	NR

Note: USCHO did not release a poll in weeks 1, 13, or 26.
