= 2024–25 Vermont Catamounts men's ice hockey season =

- Conference: 11th Hockey East
- Home ice: Gutterson Fieldhouse

Rankings
- USCHO: NR
- USA Hockey: NR

Record
- Overall: 11–21–3
- Conference: 6–16–2
- Home: 4–13–2
- Road: 7–8–1

Coaches and captains
- Head coach: Steve Wiedler
- Assistant coaches: Scott Moser; Brendan Bradley; Shane Madolora
- Captain(s): Joel Määttä; Will Zapernick
- Alternate captain: Jens Richards

The 2024–25 Vermont Catamounts men's ice hockey season was the 69th season of play for the program, the 52nd at the Division I level and the 20th in Hockey East. The Catamounts represented the University of Vermont in the 2024–25 NCAA Division I men's ice hockey season, played their home games at the Gutterson Fieldhouse and were coached by Steve Wiedler in his 2nd season.

== Season ==
Vermont's season had trouble getting off the ground thanks to inconsistent play on both sides of the puck. The Catamounts were only able to win once in their first eight games, however, the early season trouble did give Axel Mangbo a change at the starting role. With the sophomore in goal, the team was able to post a few wins in November. Unfortunately, the offense was still unsettled and it took until December for Vermont to demonstrate any level of competency. When the offense did wake up, the team was able put together a 5-game winning streak while averaging 6 goals per game. The stretch lifted them up to a .500 record by the beginning of January and gave the team an outside shot at an at-large bid.

Though the team was hoping to continue their hot streak, as soon as they returned to their conference slate, the Catamounts found it incredible difficult to score. Over the six matches immediately after their winning stretch, Vermont averaged just over 2 goals per game. The team had a brief reprieve in mid-February when the scoring returned, however, around the same time, the strong goaltending the team had been receiving vanished. Mangbo was suddenly unable to keep the puck out of the net and, when he was replaced, Keenan Rancier wasn't any better. The Catamounts allowed at least 4 goals in each of their final 7 games, losing each contest. The losses sunk the team to the bottom of the standings putting the team in the familiar position of having to begin their postseason run on the road in the Opening Round.

Rancier got the start and gave up 2 goals in quick succession in the first. Colin Kessler was able to cut into the lead with his team-leading (tied) twelfth of the season before the period was over to keep contact with Massachusetts. The defense did yeoman's work over the final 40 minutes, insulating their goaltender and limiting the Minutemen to only 10 shots, however, the offense was unable to do their part and was unable to secure a second goal. The loss consigned the Catamounts to their eighth consecutive losing season, continuing the worst stretch stretch in program history.

== Departures ==
Player	Position	Nationality	Cause
Ralfs Bergmanis	Defenseman	Latvia	Transferred to Minnesota State
Jérémie Bucheler	Defenseman	Canada	Graduation (signed with San Jose Barracuda)
Andrei Buyalsky	Forward	Kazakhstan	Signed professional contract Barys Astana
Gabe Carriere	Goaltender	Canada	Graduation (signed with San Jose Barracuda)
Zach Dubinsky	Forward	United States	Graduation (signed with Iowa Heartlanders)
Lucas Jones	Defenseman	Canada	Transferred to Plymouth State
Ryan Miotto	Forward	Canada	Graduation (signed with Wheeling Nailers)
Chris Théodore	Forward	Canada	Graduation (signed with Jokers de Cergy-Pontoise)

== Recruiting ==
Player	Position	Nationality	Age	Notes
Colin Kessler	Forward	United States	20	Anchorage, AK
Charlie Kinsman	Defenseman	United States	19	Orchard Park, NY
Michael La Starza	Forward	Canada	20	Montreal, QC
Keenan Rancier	Goaltender	Canada	24	Victoria, BC; transfer from Minnesota State
Blake Steenerson	Forward	United States	19	Maple Grove, MN
Max Strand	Forward	United States	21	Roseau, MN
Sebastian Törnqvist	Defenseman	Sweden	21	Everlöv, SWE; transfer from Massachusetts
Jax Wismer	Defenseman	Canada	19	Newmarket, ON

== Roster ==
As of September 22, 2024.

No.	Nat.	Player	Class	Pos	Height	Weight	DoB	Hometown	Previous team	NHL rights
1	(Canada)	Connor MacKenzie	Sophomore	G	6' 0" (1.83 m)	165 lb (75 kg)	2002-05-10	Toronto, Ontario	Grande Prairie Storm (AJHL)	—
2	(Canada)	Eli Barnett	Sophomore	D	6' 6" (1.98 m)	218 lb (99 kg)	2003-09-16	Ottawa, Ontario	Victoria Grizzlies (BCHL)	SJS, 195th overall 2022
4	(Sweden)	Philip Törnqvist	Junior	D	6' 0" (1.83 m)	181 lb (82 kg)	2001-08-24	Gothenburg, Sweden	Wichita Falls Warriors (NAHL)	—
6	(United States)	Charlie Kinsman	Freshman	D	5' 11" (1.8 m)	190 lb (86 kg)	2005-03-17	Orchard Park, New York	Tri-City Storm (USHL)	—
7	(United States)	Colin Kessler	Freshman	F	6' 1" (1.85 m)	181 lb (82 kg)	2004-06-07	Anchorage, Alaska	Sioux City Musketeers (USHL)	—
9	(Finland)	Joel Määttä (C)	Senior	F	6' 2" (1.88 m)	202 lb (92 kg)	2002-07-06	Helsinki, Finland	Sioux City Musketeers (USHL)	EDM, 222nd overall 2022
10	(United States)	Mario Gasparini	Sophomore	D	5' 11" (1.8 m)	170 lb (77 kg)	2003-02-28	Lakeville, Minnesota	Wenatchee Wild (BCHL)	—
11	(Canada)	Mateo Dixon	Sophomore	F	5' 10" (1.78 m)	185 lb (84 kg)	2002-08-19	Toronto, Ontario	Coquitlam Express (BCHL)	—
12	(United States)	Blake Steenerson	Freshman	F	6' 4" (1.93 m)	194 lb (88 kg)	2005-04-29	Maple Grove, Minnesota	Tri-City Storm (USHL)	—
13	(Russia)	Timofei Spitserov	Junior	F	6' 0" (1.83 m)	176 lb (80 kg)	2002-03-26	Saint Petersburg, Russia	Culver Academies (Midget AAA)	SJS, 210th overall 2020
14	(Canada)	Dawson Good	Sophomore	F	6' 1" (1.85 m)	205 lb (93 kg)	2002-04-17	Abbotsford, British Columbia	Chilliwack Chiefs (BCHL)	—
15	(Germany)	Luca Münzenberger	Junior	D	6' 2" (1.88 m)	200 lb (91 kg)	2002-11-24	Düsseldorf, Germany	Kölner U20 (DNL)	EDM, 90th overall 2021
16	(Canada)	Will Zapernick (C)	Graduate	F	5' 9" (1.75 m)	180 lb (82 kg)	1999-11-16	Edmonton, Alberta	Sherwood Park Crusaders (AJHL)	—
17	(Canada)	Matt Cato	Sophomore	F	5' 11" (1.8 m)	174 lb (79 kg)	2003-09-15	Whitby, Ontario	Trenton Golden Hawks (OJHL)	—
18	(Canada)	Massimo Lombardi	Junior	F	5' 10" (1.78 m)	195 lb (88 kg)	2002-05-18	Beaconsfield, Quebec	Cowichan Valley Capitals (BCHL)	—
19	(Slovakia)	Simon Jellúš	Senior	F	6' 2" (1.88 m)	202 lb (92 kg)	2001-01-18	Ilava, Slovakia	Karlskrona J20 (J20 Nationell)	—
20	(Canada)	Xavier Henry	Junior	D	6' 5" (1.96 m)	216 lb (98 kg)	2001-03-20	Scarborough, Ontario	Chilliwack Chiefs (BCHL)	—
21	(United States)	Daniel Sambuco	Sophomore	F	6' 0" (1.83 m)	190 lb (86 kg)	2003-06-10	Springfield, Pennsylvania	Lincoln Stars (USHL)	—
22	(Sweden)	Isak Walther	Senior	F	6' 3" (1.91 m)	179 lb (81 kg)	2001-08-02	Södertälje, Sweden	Södertälje J20 (J20 Nationell)	NSH, 179th overall 2019
23	(Canada)	Jax Wismer	Freshman	D	6' 0" (1.83 m)	176 lb (80 kg)	2005-03-03	Newmarket, Ontario	Alberni Valley Bulldogs (BCHL)	—
24	(Canada)	Michael La Starza	Freshman	F	5' 11" (1.8 m)	190 lb (86 kg)	2004-01-14	Montreal, Quebec	Fargo Force (USHL)	—
25	(United States)	Jack Malinski	Sophomore	D	5' 10" (1.78 m)	170 lb (77 kg)	2002-06-23	Lakeville, Minnesota	Austin Bruins (NAHL)	—
26	(Canada)	Thomas Sinclair	Junior	F	6' 3" (1.91 m)	194 lb (88 kg)	2002-12-26	Toronto, Ontario	Fargo Force (USHL)	—
27	(Canada)	Duncan Ramsay	Sophomore	D	6' 5" (1.96 m)	205 lb (93 kg)	2004-02-08	Halifax, Nova Scotia	Chilliwack Chiefs (BCHL)	—
29	(United States)	Max Strand	Freshman	F	5' 10" (1.78 m)	190 lb (86 kg)	2003-09-03	Roseau, Minnesota	Sioux City Musketeers (USHL)	—
35	(Canada)	Keenan Rancier	Senior	G	6' 2" (1.88 m)	184 lb (83 kg)	2000-06-21	Victoria, British Columbia	Minnesota State (CCHA)	—
37	(United States)	Nick Ahern	Sophomore	F	5' 10" (1.78 m)	161 lb (73 kg)	2002-12-02	Chicago, Illinois	Johnstown Tomahawks (NAHL)	—
38	(Sweden)	Sebastian Törnqvist	Sophomore	D	5' 11" (1.8 m)	187 lb (85 kg)	2003-05-22	Everlöv, Sweden	Massachusetts (HEA)	—
40	(United States)	Jens Richards (A)	Junior	F	6' 2" (1.88 m)	194 lb (88 kg)	2002-12-14	Detroit Lakes, Minnesota	Austin Bruins (NAHL)	—
50	(Sweden)	Axel Mangbo	Sophomore	G	6' 3" (1.91 m)	181 lb (82 kg)	2003-04-15	Höganäs, Sweden	Sioux City Musketeers (USHL)	—

== Standings ==
2024–25 Hockey East Standings
	Conference record										Overall record					
	GP	W	L	T	OTW	OTL	SW	PTS	GF	GA	GP	W	L	T	GF	GA
#4 Boston College †	24	18	4	2	2	0	1	55	82	40	37	27	8	2	125	65
#8 Maine *	24	13	5	6	1	1	5	50	67	45	38	24	8	6	124	75
#2 Boston University	24	14	8	2	1	1	2	46	89	65	40	24	14	2	150	119
#7 Connecticut	24	12	8	4	3	2	1	40	76	65	39	23	12	4	130	97
#13 Providence	24	11	8	5	2	2	1	39	65	67	37	21	11	5	103	96
#10 Massachusetts	24	10	9	5	0	0	2	37	69	58	40	21	14	5	133	97
Massachusetts Lowell	24	8	13	3	0	1	2	30	57	69	36	16	16	4	93	101
Merrimack	24	9	14	1	1	0	1	28	57	81	35	13	21	1	81	112
Northeastern	24	7	14	3	1	1	2	26	48	71	37	14	20	3	88	112
New Hampshire	24	5	14	5	0	2	1	23	53	73	35	13	16	6	96	100
Vermont	24	6	16	2	2	3	1	22	59	88	35	11	21	3	100	116
Championship: March 21, 2025 † indicates regular season champion * indicates conference tournament champion (Lamoriello Trophy); Rankings: USCHO Division I Men's Poll

== Schedule and results ==
Date	Time	Opponent^{#}	Rank^{#}	Site	TV	Decision	Result	Attendance	Record
Exhibition
October 6	4:00 pm	McGill*		Gutterson Fieldhouse • Burlington, Vermont (Exhibition)	ESPN+	Rancier	W 5–0	2,387	
Regular Season
October 11	8:00 pm	at St. Thomas*		St. Thomas Ice Arena • Mendota Heights, Minnesota	Midco Sports+	Rancier	T 5–5 ^{OT}	650	0–0–1
October 12	7:00 pm	at St. Thomas*		St. Thomas Ice Arena • Mendota Heights, Minnesota	Midco Sports+	Rancier	L 1–3	813	0–1–1
October 19	7:30 pm	Clarkson*		Gutterson Fieldhouse • Burlington, Vermont	ESPN+	Rancier	L 1–3	2,954	0–2–1
October 25	7:00 pm	#13 Providence		Gutterson Fieldhouse • Burlington, Vermont	ESPN+	Rancier	L 2–3 ^{OT}	2,283	0–3–1 (0–1–0)
October 26	6:00 pm	#13 Providence		Gutterson Fieldhouse • Burlington, Vermont	ESPN+	Rancier	T 4–4 ^{SOL}	2,398	0–3–2 (0–1–1)
November 2	3:30 pm	at Connecticut		XL Center • Hartford, Connecticut	ESPN+	Mangbo	W 1–0 ^{OT}	3,029	1–3–2 (1–1–1)
November 3	3:00 pm	at Connecticut		Toscano Family Ice Forum • Storrs, Connecticut	ESPN+	Mangbo	L 5–6 ^{OT}	2,279	1–4–2 (1–2–1)
November 8	7:00 pm	#18 Massachusetts		Gutterson Fieldhouse • Burlington, Vermont	ESPN+	Rancier	T 3–3 ^{SOW}	2,558	1–4–3 (1–2–2)
November 9	7:00 pm	#18 Massachusetts		Gutterson Fieldhouse • Burlington, Vermont	ESPN+	Mangbo	W 4–0	2,903	2–4–3 (2–2–2)
November 15	7:00 pm	#15 Massachusetts Lowell		Gutterson Fieldhouse • Burlington, Vermont	ESPN+	Mangbo	L 2–5	2,145	2–5–3 (2–3–2)
November 16	7:00 pm	#15 Massachusetts Lowell		Gutterson Fieldhouse • Burlington, Vermont	ESPN+	Rancier	L 0–3	2,667	2–6–3 (2–4–2)
November 24	3:00 pm	at #20 Massachusetts		Mullins Center • Amherst, Massachusetts	ESPN+	Mangbo	W 3–2	3,368	3–6–3 (3–4–2)
December 1	4:00 pm	#15 Dartmouth*		Gutterson Fieldhouse • Burlington, Vermont	ESPN+	Mangbo	L 1–3	2,247	3–7–3
December 6	7:00 pm	Long Island*		Gutterson Fieldhouse • Burlington, Vermont	ESPN+	Mangbo	L 2–3	2,023	3–8–3
December 7	6:00 pm	Long Island*		Gutterson Fieldhouse • Burlington, Vermont	ESPN+	Rancier	W 7–4	1,986	4–8–3
December 13	7:00 pm	at Union*		Achilles Rink • Schenectady, New York	ESPN+	Mangbo	W 6–2	1,328	5–8–3
December 14	4:00 pm	at Union*		Achilles Rink • Schenectady, New York	ESPN+	Mangbo	W 3–2	1,746	6–8–3
December 29	6:00 pm	at Army*		Tate Rink • West Point, New York	FloHockey	Mangbo	W 6–0	1,960	7–8–3
January 4	6:00 pm	St. Lawrence*		Gutterson Fieldhouse • Burlington, Vermont	ESPN+	Mangbo	W 8–1	3,325	8–8–3
January 10	7:00 pm	at #15 Boston University		Agganis Arena • Boston, Massachusetts	ESPN+	Mangbo	L 1–6	4,499	8–9–3 (3–5–2)
January 11	5:00 pm	at #15 Boston University		Agganis Arena • Boston, Massachusetts	ESPN+	Mangbo	L 4–7	4,170	8–10–3 (3–6–2)
January 17	7:00 pm	Northeastern		Gutterson Fieldhouse • Burlington, Vermont	ESPN+	Mangbo	L 1–2 ^{OT}	2,757	8–11–3 (3–7–2)
January 18	6:00 pm	Northeastern		Gutterson Fieldhouse • Burlington, Vermont	ESPN+	Mangbo	L 2–3	3,292	8–12–3 (3–8–2)
January 24	7:00 pm	at #18 New Hampshire		Whittemore Center • Durham, New Hampshire	ESPN+	Rancier	W 3–2	4,705	9–12–3 (4–8–2)
January 25	7:00 pm	at #18 New Hampshire		Whittemore Center • Durham, New Hampshire	ESPN+	Rancier	L 2–5	5,873	9–13–3 (4–9–2)
February 7	7:00 pm	at #10 Massachusetts Lowell		Tsongas Center • Lowell, Massachusetts	ESPN+	Mangbo	W 5–3	3,979	10–13–3 (5–9–2)
February 14	7:00 pm	at Merrimack		J. Thom Lawler Rink • North Andover, Massachusetts	ESPN+	Mangbo	W 4–2	1,984	11–13–3 (6–9–2)
February 15	7:00 pm	at Merrimack		J. Thom Lawler Rink • North Andover, Massachusetts	ESPN+	Mangbo	L 3–4	2,031	11–14–3 (6–10–2)
February 21	7:00 pm	#2 Boston College		Gutterson Fieldhouse • Burlington, Vermont	ESPN+	Mangbo	L 3–6	3,687	11–15–3 (6–11–2)
February 22	7:30 pm	#2 Boston College		Gutterson Fieldhouse • Burlington, Vermont	ESPN+	Mangbo	L 1–4	3,566	11–16–3 (6–12–2)
February 28	7:00 pm	at #5 Maine		Alfond Arena • Orono, Maine	ESPN+	Mangbo	L 1–4	4,703	11–17–3 (6–13–2)
March 1	7:00 pm	at #5 Maine		Alfond Arena • Orono, Maine	ESPN+	Rancier	L 3–4	5,043	11–18–3 (6–14–2)
March 6	7:00 pm	#8 Connecticut		Gutterson Fieldhouse • Burlington, Vermont	ESPN+	Mangbo	L 1–4	1,911	11–19–3 (6–15–2)
March 8	7:00 pm	#10 Boston University		Gutterson Fieldhouse • Burlington, Vermont	ESPN+	Rancier	L 1–6	2,674	11–20–3 (6–16–2)
Hockey East Tournament
March 12	7:00 pm	at #14 Massachusetts*		Mullins Center • Amherst, Massachusetts (Hockey East Opening Round)	ESPN+, NESN	Rancier	L 1–2	3,670	11–21–3
*Non-conference game. ^{#}Rankings from USCHO.com Poll. All times are in Eastern Time. Source:

== Scoring statistics ==
Name	Position	Games	Goals	Assists	Points	PIM
Joel Määttä	C	35	9	18	27	16
Colin Kessler	F	34	12	11	23	39
Max Strand	F	33	8	14	22	8
Simon Jellúš	C/LW	35	9	12	21	14
Timofey Spitserov	RW	33	12	6	18	4
Massimo Lombardi	C	35	8	10	18	8
Sebastian Törnqvist	D	31	1	17	18	46
Isak Walther	RW	33	6	11	17	10
Will Zapernick	C/RW	35	3	14	17	10
Jax Wismer	D	34	2	13	15	22
Blake Steenerson	F	32	5	8	13	23
Luca Münzenberger	D	31	5	7	12	18
Xavier Henry	D	26	4	6	10	10
Thomas Sinclair	C	33	3	5	8	21
Philip Törnqvist	D	33	2	6	8	4
Jens Richards	F	26	5	2	7	6
Michael La Starza	LW	18	2	3	5	4
Daniel Sambuco	F	27	2	2	4	46
Duncan Ramsay	D	32	0	3	3	6
Charlie Kinsman	D	26	1	1	2	2
Mateo Dixon	C	4	1	0	1	17
Nick Ahern	LW	3	0	1	1	0
Mario Gasparini	D	6	0	1	1	0
Jack Malinski	D	15	0	1	1	6
Axel Mangbo	G	23	0	1	1	0
Matt Cato	C	2	0	0	0	0
Connor MacKenzie	G	3	0	0	0	0
Dawson Good	F	7	0	0	0	2
Eli Barnett	D	8	0	0	0	2
Keenan Rancier	G	14	0	0	0	0
Bench	–	–	–	–	–	12
Total			100	173	273	356

== Goaltending statistics ==
Name	Games	Minutes	Wins	Losses	Ties	Goals against	Saves	Shut outs	SV %	GAA
Connor MacKenzie	3	48:08	0	0	0	1	19	0	.950	1.25
Axel Mangbo	25	1274:49	9	13	0	65	525	3	.890	3.06
Keenan Rancier	14	782:32	2	8	3	44	339	0	.885	3.37
Empty Net	-	25:52	-	-	-	6	-	-	-	-
Total	35	2131:21	11	21	3	116	884	3	.884	3.27

== Rankings ==
Poll	Week																											
Poll	Pre	1	2	3	4	5	6	7	8	9	10	11	12	13	14	15	16	17	18	19	20	21	22	23	24	25	26	27 (Final)
USCHO.com	NR	NR	NR	NR	NR	NR	NR	NR	NR	NR	NR	NR	–	NR	NR	NR	NR	NR	NR	NR	NR	NR	NR	NR	NR	NR	–	NR
USA Hockey	NR	NR	NR	NR	NR	NR	NR	NR	NR	NR	NR	NR	–	NR	NR	NR	NR	NR	NR	NR	NR	NR	NR	NR	NR	NR	NR	NR

Note: USCHO did not release a poll in week 12 or 26.
Note: USA Hockey did not release a poll in week 12.

== Awards and honors ==
Player	Award	Ref
Colin Kessler	Hockey East All-Rookie Team	

== 2025 NHL entry draft ==
Round	Pick	Player	NHL team
4	120	Caeden Herrington ^{†}	Los Angeles Kings

† incoming freshman
