= 2020–21 Merrimack Warriors men's ice hockey season =

- Conference: 9th Hockey East
- Home ice: J. Thom Lawler Rink

Rankings
- USCHO: NR
- USA Today: NR

Record
- Overall: 5–11–2
- Conference: 5–11–2
- Home: 2–6–1
- Road: 3–5–1
- Neutral: 0–0–0

Coaches and captains
- Head coach: Scott Borek
- Assistant coaches: Josh Ciocco; Dan Jewell
- Captain: Chase Gresock

The 2020-21 Merrimack Warriors Men's ice hockey season was the 66th season of play for the program, the 32nd at the Division I level, and the 32nd season in the Hockey East conference. The Warriors represented Merrimack College and were coached by Scott Borek, in his 3rd season.

== Season ==
As a result of the ongoing COVID-19 pandemic the entire college ice hockey season was delayed. Because the NCAA had previously announced that all winter sports athletes would retain whatever eligibility they possessed through at least the following year, none of Merrimack's players would lose a season of play. However, the NCAA also approved a change in its transfer regulations that would allow players to transfer and play immediately rather than having to sit out a season, as the rules previously required.

Due to cancellations and rescheduling Merrimack began the season playing ranked teams in eight consecutive games. As a result, the team's record was a paltry 1–7. Despite the losses, the team was able to keep the score close in most games and used the experience to improve in the second half of the season. Merrimack ended the regular season on a 4–4–2 run, not a particularly stellar record, but a vast improvement over their start. The Warriors had risen to 9th in the conference and were getting ready to play Vermont on the final week of the regular season. Unfortunately, several members of the team entered COVID-19 protocols on March 4. As a result, not only was the Vermont series cancelled but, since the team could not feasibly receive a clean bill of health before the Hockey East Tournament began on March 10, Merrimack had to withdraw from postseason play and end their season.

James Corcoran and Jordan Seyfert sat out the season.

== Departures ==
Player	Position	Nationality	Cause
Joey Cassetti	Forward	United States	Transferred to Miami
Tyler Drevitch	Forward	United States	Graduation (Signed with Wheeling Nailers)
Tyler Irvine	Forward	United States	Graduation (Signed with Binghamton Devils)
Griff Jeszka	Forward	United States	Graduation (Signed with Worcester Railers)
Sami Tavernier	Forward	France	Graduation (Signed with Syracuse Crunch)
August Von Ungern-Sternberg	Forward	United States	Signed professional contract (Rostock Piranhas)

== Recruiting ==
Player	Position	Nationality	Age	Notes
Zachary Borgiel	Goaltender	United States	20	Fort Gratiot, MI
Alex Jefferies	Forward	United States	18	Lunenburg, MA; selected 121st overall in 2020
Filip Karlsson-Tägtström	Forward	Sweden	21	Stockholm, SWE
Jakob Lee	Forward	Canada	21	Owen Sound, ON
Conor Lovett	Forward	United States	19	Franklin, MA
Mick Messner	Forward	United States	21	Madison, WI; transfer from Wisconsin
Max Newton	Forward	Canada	22	Vancouver, BC; transfer from Alaska
Kevin Sadovski	Defenseman	United States	21	Palm Coast, FL

== Roster ==
As of February 12, 2021.

No.	Nat.	Player	Class	Pos	Height	Weight	DoB	Hometown	Previous team	NHL rights
1	(Finland)	Jere Huhtamaa	Sophomore	G	6' 2" (1.88 m)	198 lb (90 kg)	2000-04-10	Helsinki, Finland	Jokerit U20 (Nuorten SM-liiga)	—
2	(United States)	Patrick Holway	Senior	D	6' 5" (1.96 m)	208 lb (94 kg)	1996-10-01	Cohasset, Massachusetts	Maine (HEA)	DET, 170th overall 2015
3	(United States)	Declan Carlile	Sophomore	D	6' 2" (1.88 m)	192 lb (87 kg)	2000-05-18	Hartland, Michigan	Muskegon (USHL)	—
4	(United States)	Conor Lovett	Freshman	F	5' 11" (1.8 m)	196 lb (89 kg)	2001-04-07	Franklin, Massachusetts	Lawrence Academy (USHS–MA)	—
5	(United States)	Jacob Modry	Sophomore	D	6' 5" (1.96 m)	214 lb (97 kg)	1999-01-23	El Segundo, California	Wenatchee (BCHL)	—
6	(Canada)	Zach Vinnell	Sophomore	D	6' 1" (1.85 m)	185 lb (84 kg)	1998-04-03	Cochrane, Alberta	Camrose (AJHL)	—
7	(Canada)	Zach Uens	Sophomore	D	6' 1" (1.85 m)	195 lb (88 kg)	2001-05-13	Belleville, Ontario	Wellington (OJHL)	FLA, 105th overall 2020
8	(Canada)	Liam Dennison	Sophomore	D	5' 9" (1.75 m)	172 lb (78 kg)	1999-02-07	Manotick, Ontario	Youngstown (USHL)	—
9	(United States)	Liam Walsh	Sophomore	F	6' 1" (1.85 m)	191 lb (87 kg)	1999-07-14	Bridgeville, Pennsylvania	Cedar Rapids (USHL)	—
10	(Canada)	Max Newton	Senior	F	5' 10" (1.78 m)	185 lb (84 kg)	1997-11-14	Vancouver, British Columbia	Alaska (WCHA)	—
11	(United States)	Mick Messner	Junior	F	5' 11" (1.8 m)	193 lb (88 kg)	1999-04-20	Madison, Wisconsin	Wisconsin (Big Ten)	—
12	(United States)	Jordan Seyfert	Junior	F	5' 10" (1.78 m)	179 lb (81 kg)	1999-04-03	Annville, Pennsylvania	Fargo (USHL)	—
13	(United States)	Chase Gresock (C)	Junior	F	6' 1" (1.85 m)	211 lb (96 kg)	1998-08-13	Powell, Ohio	Youngstown (USHL)	—
14	(United States)	Patrick Kramer	Graduate	F	6' 0" (1.83 m)	205 lb (93 kg)	1997-03-06	Bridgewater, Massachusetts	Youngstown (USHL)	—
15	(Sweden)	Hugo Esselin	Sophomore	F	6' 2" (1.88 m)	199 lb (90 kg)	2000-07-15	Stockholm, Sweden	Djurgårdens J20 (J20 SuperElit)	—
16	(Canada)	Regan Kimens	Sophomore	F	6' 2" (1.88 m)	192 lb (87 kg)	1999-03-28	Vaughan, Ontario	Coquitlam (BCHL)	—
17	(United States)	Mac Welsher	Sophomore	F	5' 8" (1.73 m)	182 lb (83 kg)	1999-04-24	Grosse Pointe Farms, Michigan	Des Moines (USHL)	—
18	(Canada)	Ben Brar	Sophomore	F	6' 2" (1.88 m)	193 lb (88 kg)	1998-11-19	Abbotsford, British Columbia	Prince George (BCHL)	—
19	(United States)	Alex Jefferies	Freshman	F	6' 0" (1.83 m)	199 lb (90 kg)	2001-11-08	Lunenburg, Massachusetts	The Gunnery (USHS–CT)	NYI, 121st overall 2020
20	(Canada)	Jakob Lee	Freshman	F	6' 0" (1.83 m)	186 lb (84 kg)	1999-02-12	Owen Sound, Ontario	Brooks (AJHL)	—
21	(United States)	Christian Simeone	Junior	F	6' 1" (1.85 m)	183 lb (83 kg)	1997-02-12	Milton, Massachusetts	Alberni Valley (BCHL)	—
22	(United States)	Logan Drevitch	Junior	F	5' 9" (1.75 m)	168 lb (76 kg)	1998-04-14	Middleborough, Massachusetts	Boston Bandits (NCDC)	—
23	(United States)	Kevin Sadovski	Freshman	D	6' 1" (1.85 m)	200 lb (91 kg)	1999-07-06	Palm Coast, Florida	Utica (NCDC)	—
24	(United States)	Ryan Nolan	Sophomore	F	6' 1" (1.85 m)	198 lb (90 kg)	1998-07-14	Winnetka, Illinois	Victoria (BCHL)	—
25	(Sweden)	Filip Karlsson-Tägtström	Freshman	F	5' 9" (1.75 m)	165 lb (75 kg)	1999-07-14	Stockholm, Sweden	Sioux Falls (USHL)	—
26	(Canada)	Tyler Heidt	Junior	D	6' 0" (1.83 m)	192 lb (87 kg)	1998-11-07	Saskatoon, Saskatchewan	Melfort (SJHL)	—
27	(United States)	Dominic Dockery	Senior	D	6' 2" (1.88 m)	185 lb (84 kg)	1997-01-02	Lockport, New York	Youngstown (USHL)	—
28	(Sweden)	Filip Forsmark	Sophomore	F	5' 11" (1.8 m)	166 lb (75 kg)	1998-06-23	Skövde, Sweden	Tri-City (USHL)	—
29	(United States)	Zachary Borgiel	Freshman	G	6' 2" (1.88 m)	205 lb (93 kg)	2000-04-27	Fort Gratiot, Michigan	Cowichan Valley (BCHL)	—
30	(United States)	Troy Kobryn	Sophomore	G	6' 0" (1.83 m)	198 lb (90 kg)	1999-02-14	Hillsborough, New Jersey	Cedar Rapids (USHL)	—
31	(United States)	James Corcoran	Sophomore	G	6' 4" (1.93 m)	195 lb (88 kg)	1998-02-23	Walpole, Massachusetts	Winchendon (USHS–MA)	—

== Standings ==
2020–21 Hockey East Standings
	Conference record										Overall record					
	GP	W	L	T	OTW	OTL	SOW	HEPI	GF	GA	GP	W	L	T	GF	GA
#6 Boston College	21	16	4	1	3	2	0	58.61	82	46	24	17	6	1	91	58
#11 Boston University	14	10	3	1	3	1	1	56.36	49	37	16	10	5	1	52	45
#1 Massachusetts *	22	13	5	4	1	1	1	55.44	76	42	29	20	5	4	103	48
Connecticut	22	10	10	2	1	4	2	52.01	69	63	23	10	11	2	70	69
#16 Providence	23	10	8	5	0	0	2	50.80	63	61	25	11	9	5	71	67
Northeastern	20	9	8	3	1	0	3	49.94	68	60	21	9	9	3	69	64
#19 Massachusetts–Lowell	16	7	8	1	1	1	0	48.00	46	53	20	10	9	1	59	63
Maine	15	3	10	2	0	1	2	46.66	41	61	16	3	11	2	43	68
Merrimack	18	5	11	2	0	1	0	45.38	47	66	18	5	11	2	47	66
New Hampshire	21	5	13	3	3	2	2	43.66	51	83	23	6	14	3	60	88
Vermont	12	1	9	2	0	0	0	38.02	17	37	13	1	10	2	20	42
Championship: March 20, 2021; No Regular Season Champion Awarded * indicates conference tournament champion (Lamoriello Trophy); Rankings: USCHO.com Top 20 Poll

== Schedule and results ==
Date	Time	Opponent^{#}	Rank^{#}	Site	TV	Decision	Result	Attendance	Record
Regular season
December 5	4:30 PM	at #8 Massachusetts		Mullins Center • Amherst, Massachusetts	NESN+	Borgiel	L 1–3	0	0–1–0 (0–1–0)
December 6	4:35 PM	vs. #8 Massachusetts		J. Thom Lawler Rink • North Andover, Massachusetts		Borgiel	W 3–2	0	1–1–0 (1–1–0)
December 12	6:05 PM	at #17 Northeastern		Matthews Arena • Boston, Massachusetts	NESN	Kobryn	L 2–8	0	1–2–0 (1–2–0)
December 13	4:05 PM	vs. #17 Northeastern		J. Thom Lawler Rink • North Andover, Massachusetts		Borgiel	L 3–6	0	1–3–0 (1–3–0)
January 9	7:05 PM	at #14 Northeastern		Matthews Arena • Boston, Massachusetts		Borgiel	L 2–3 ^{OT}	0	1–4–0 (1–4–0)
January 10	3:05 PM	vs. #14 Northeastern		J. Thom Lawler Rink • North Andover, Massachusetts		Kobryn	L 2–3	0	1–5–0 (1–5–0)
January 16	7:00 PM	at #3 Boston College		Conte Forum • Chestnut Hill, Massachusetts	NESN	Borgiel	L 1–2	0	1–6–0 (1–6–0)
January 17	4:05 PM	vs. #3 Boston College		J. Thom Lawler Rink • North Andover, Massachusetts		Borgiel	L 3–5	0	1–7–0 (1–7–0)
January 22	7:00 PM	at New Hampshire		Whittemore Center • Durham, New Hampshire		Borgiel	W 5–2	0	2–7–0 (2–7–0)
January 23	4:05 PM	vs. New Hampshire		J. Thom Lawler Rink • North Andover, Massachusetts		Borgiel	T 2–2 ^{SOL}	0	2–7–1 (2–7–1)
January 29	3:05 PM	vs. Connecticut		J. Thom Lawler Rink • North Andover, Massachusetts		Borgiel	L 1–6	0	2–8–1 (2–8–1)
January 30	3:00 PM	at Connecticut		Mark Edward Freitas Ice Forum • Storrs, Connecticut		Kobryn	L 2–6	0	2–9–1 (2–9–1)
February 6	2:05 PM	vs. #16 Providence		J. Thom Lawler Rink • North Andover, Massachusetts		Borgiel	L 1–5	0	2–10–1 (2–10–1)
February 7	2:00 PM	at #16 Providence		Schneider Arena • Providence, Rhode Island		Borgiel	W 3–2	0	3–10–1 (3–10–1)
February 19	4:00 PM	at New Hampshire		Whittemore Center • Durham, New Hampshire		Borgiel	T 3–3 ^{SOL}	0	3–10–2 (3–10–2)
February 20	4:05 PM	vs. New Hampshire		J. Thom Lawler Rink • North Andover, Massachusetts		Borgiel	W 6–2	0	4–10–2 (4–10–2)
February 26	4:05 PM	at #8 Boston University		Agganis Arena • Boston, Massachusetts		Huhtamaa	W 5–2	0	5–10–2 (5–10–2)
February 27	4:05 PM	vs. #8 Boston University		J. Thom Lawler Rink • North Andover, Massachusetts		Borgiel	L 2–4	0	5–11–2 (5–11–2)
Hockey East Tournament
Participation Cancelled
*Non-conference game. ^{#}Rankings from USCHO.com Poll. All times are in Eastern Time.

== Scoring statistics ==
Name	Position	Games	Goals	Assists	Points	PIM
Filip Forsmark	LW/RW	18	4	9	13	16
Liam Walsh	LW	17	7	5	12	10
Alex Jefferies	LW	12	4	6	10	2
Declan Carlile	D	14	2	8	10	10
Logan Drevitch	LW	12	3	6	9	12
Zach Vinnell	D	16	3	6	9	6
Patrick Holway	D	18	3	6	9	22
Ben Brar	F	15	4	4	8	10
Chase Gresock	F	16	4	4	8	2
Max Newton	F	9	3	4	7	4
Zach Uens	D	14	1	6	7	8
Dominic Dockery	D	14	1	6	7	2
Regan Kimens	LW	16	3	3	6	2
Conor Lovett	F	15	3	2	5	23
Patrick Kramer	C	17	0	5	5	10
Mac Welsher	C	13	1	1	2	6
Ryan Nolan	F	13	0	2	2	8
Mick Messner	LW	14	0	2	2	2
Liam Dennison	D	15	1	0	1	4
Christian Simeone	F	4	0	1	1	0
Jere Huhtamaa	G	3	0	0	0	0
Troy Kobryn	G	3	0	0	0	0
Kevin Sadovski	D	3	0	0	0	0
Hugo Esselin	C	6	0	0	0	4
Filip Karlsson-Tägtström	C	9	0	0	0	2
Jacob Modry	D	10	0	0	0	2
Tyler Heidt	D	12	0	0	0	4
Jakob Lee	C	13	0	0	0	10
Zachary Borgiel	G	15	0	0	0	0
Bench	-	18	-	-	-	4
Total			47	86	133	185

== Goaltending statistics ==
Name	Games	Minutes	Wins	Losses	Ties	Goals against	Saves	Shut outs	SV %	GAA
Jere Huhtamaa	3	141	1	0	0	7	67	0	.905	2.97
Zachary Borgiel	15	792	4	8	2	41	310	0	.883	3.10
Troy Kobryn	3	147	0	3	0	14	73	0	.839	5.72
Empty Net	-	11	-	-	-	4	-	-	-	-
Total	18	1092	5	11	2	66	450	0	.872	3.63

== Rankings ==
Poll	Week																					
Poll	Pre	1	2	3	4	5	6	7	8	9	10	11	12	13	14	15	16	17	18	19	20	21 (Final)
USCHO.com	NR	NR	NR	NR	NR	NR	NR	NR	NR	NR	NR	NR	NR	NR	NR	NR	NR	NR	NR	NR	-	NR
USA Today	NR	NR	NR	NR	NR	NR	NR	NR	NR	NR	NR	NR	NR	NR	NR	NR	NR	NR	NR	NR	NR	NR

USCHO did not release a poll in week 20.

== Awards and honors ==
Player	Award	Ref
Alex Jefferies	Hockey East Rookie Team	
