= 2024–25 Merrimack Warriors men's ice hockey season =

- Conference: 8th Hockey East
- Home ice: J. Thom Lawler Rink

Rankings
- USCHO: NR
- USA Hockey: NR

Record
- Overall: 13–21–1
- Conference: 9–14–1
- Home: 7–8–1
- Road: 6–9–0
- Neutral: 0–3–0

Coaches and captains
- Head coach: Scott Borek
- Assistant coaches: Dan Jewell; Jimmy Mullin; Chris Ross
- Captain: Antonio Venuto
- Alternate captain(s): Mark Hillier; Harrison Roy; Tyler Young

The 2024–25 Merrimack Warriors Men's ice hockey season was the 69th season of play for the program, the 36th at the Division I level, and the 36th in Hockey East. The Warriors represented Merrimack College in the 2024–25 NCAA Division I men's ice hockey season, played their home games at the J. Thom Lawler Rink and were coached by Scott Borek, in his 7th season.

== Season ==
Hoping to rebound from a poor season in '24, Merrimack won just once in its first seven games and was never able to recover. The large number of changes to the roster did the team no favors and the squad had trouble jelling. The resulting dearth of scoring hampered the team's efforts to compete in a very strong Hockey East and the Warriors were relegated to the conference cellar for most of the year. The team had its moments: winning five games against ranked opponents, including then-#2 Boston College, sweeping tournament-bound Connecticut in early November, but they could not sustain any level of competency. The club did show some fight at the end, pushing Northeastern into overtime in their playoff game. But the lack of offense doomed the Warriors and saw their season come to a swift end.

== Departures ==
Player	Position	Nationality	Cause
Adam Arvedson	Defenseman	Sweden	Signed professional contract (signed with IF Troja-Ljungby)
Steven Bacovsky	Goaltender	Canada	Transferred to Carleton
Zachary Borgiel	Goaltender	United States	Graduate transfer to Providence
Nikita Borodayenko	Forward	Russia	Transferred to Dubuque
Ben Brar	Forward	Canada	Graduation (signed with Florida Everblades)
Mike Brown	Defenseman	United States	Transferred to Lake Superior State
Liam Cavan	Defenseman	Canada	Left program (retired)
Matt Copponi	Forward	United States	Transferred to Boston University
Liam Dennison	Defenseman	Canada	Graduation (signed with Utah Grizzlies)
Frank Djurasevic	Defenseman	United States	Transferred to Maine
Christian Felton	Defenseman	United States	Graduation (signed with Vancouver Canucks)
Filip Forsmark	Forward	Sweden	Graduation (signed with Allen Americans)
Mark Gallant	Forward	United States	Graduation (signed with Jacksonville Icemen)
Brady Hunter	Forward	Canada	Transferred to Stonehill
Alex Jefferies	Forward	United States	Graduation (signed with New York Islanders)
Devlin O'Brien	Forward	Canada	Transferred to Stonehill
Hugo Ollas	Goaltender	Sweden	Signed professional contract (signed with New York Rangers)
Chase Stevenson	Forward	Canada	Graduate transfer to New Hampshire
Mac Welsher	Forward	United States	Graduation (signed with Adirondack Thunder)

== Recruiting ==
Player	Position	Nationality	Age	Notes
Caden Cranston	Forward	United States	20	Rochester, NY
Michael Emerson	Forward	United States	20	Yorktown Heights, NY; transfer from North Dakota; selected 190th overall in 2023
Colby Enns	Defenseman	United States	25	Minot, ND; graduate transfer from Northern Michigan
Caelan Fitzpatrick	Forward	Canada	21	Moose Jaw, SK
Jordan Hughesman	Forward	Canada	21	Winnipeg, MB
Ryan Keyes	Goaltender	United States	21	Fairbanks, AK
Nathan King	Defenseman	Canada	20	Victoria, BC
Cameron Kungle	Defenseman	Canada	22	Red Deer, AB; transfer from Lake Superior State
Max Lundgren	Goaltender	Sweden	22	Ängelholm, SWE
Josef Myšák	Defenseman	Czech Republic	25	Litvínov, CZE; graduate transfer from Niagara
Ryan O'Connell	Forward	United States	20	Moorestown, NJ
Nick Pierre	Forward	Canada	20	Cottage Grove, MN
Seamus Powell	Defenseman	United States	20	Marcellus, NY; transfer from Boston College
Jack Richard	Forward	Canada	21	Stoney Creek, ON; transfer from Niagara
Harrison Roy	Forward	United States	24	Lakeville, MA; graduate transfer from Lake Superior State
Antonio Venuto	Forward	United States	24	Whitmore Lake, MI; graduate transfer from Ferris State
Hunter Wallace	Forward	United States	21	Oak Lake, MB
Nils Wallström	Goaltender	Sweden	20	Skellefteå, SWE; transfer from American International
Vann Yuhas	Forward	Canada	20	Medicine Hat, AB

== Roster ==
As of September 7, 2024.

No.	Nat.	Player	Class	Pos	Height	Weight	DoB	Hometown	Previous team	NHL rights
2	(Canada)	Nathan King	Freshman	D	6' 2" (1.88 m)	192 lb (87 kg)	2004-06-11	Victoria, British Columbia	Victoria Grizzlies (BCHL)	—
3	(United States)	Seamus Powell	Sophomore	D	6' 0" (1.83 m)	176 lb (80 kg)	2004-04-26	Marcellus, New York	Dubuque Fighting Saints (USHL)	—
5	(United States)	Trevor Griebel	Junior	D	5' 10" (1.78 m)	165 lb (75 kg)	2001-03-07	Tampa, Florida	Fargo Force (USHL)	—
7	(Sweden)	Max Wattvil	Sophomore	D	6' 2" (1.88 m)	192 lb (87 kg)	2002-08-11	Stockholm, Sweden	Minnesota Wilderness (NAHL)	—
8	(United States)	Harrison Roy (A)	Graduate	F	6' 1" (1.85 m)	194 lb (88 kg)	2000-01-17	Lakeville, Massachusetts	Lake Superior State (CCHA)	—
10	(Canada)	Mark Hillier (A)	Senior	F	6' 1" (1.85 m)	180 lb (82 kg)	2002-03-18	Labrador City, Newfoundland and Labrador	Summerside Western Capitals (MHL)	—
11	(United States)	Nick Pierre	Freshman	F	5' 9" (1.75 m)	165 lb (75 kg)	2004-04-09	Cottage Grove, Minnesota	Omaha Lancers (USHL)	—
13	(Canada)	Jordan Hughesman	Freshman	F	5' 11" (1.8 m)	180 lb (82 kg)	2003-04-24	Winnipeg, Manitoba	Brooks Bandits (BCHL)	—
14	(United States)	Tyler Young (A)	Junior	F	6' 1" (1.85 m)	180 lb (82 kg)	2001-05-08	Lancaster, Massachusetts	Maryland Black Bears (NAHL)	—
15	(Canada)	Vann Yuhas	Freshman	F	6' 0" (1.83 m)	174 lb (79 kg)	2004-02-20	Medicine Hat, Alberta	Drumheller Dragons (AJHL)	—
16	(United States)	David Sacco	Freshman	F	6' 1" (1.85 m)	194 lb (88 kg)	2002-01-03	Middleton, Massachusetts	Alberni Valley Bulldogs (BCHL)	—
17	(Canada)	Cam Kungle	Sophomore	D	6' 3" (1.91 m)	202 lb (92 kg)	2002-03-28	Red Deer, Alberta	Lake Superior State (CCHA)	—
19	(Canada)	Jack Richard	Sophomore	F	6' 4" (1.93 m)	180 lb (82 kg)	2002-12-13	Stoney Creek, Ontario	Niagara (AHA)	—
20	(Canada)	Ethan Bono	Sophomore	F	6' 3" (1.91 m)	201 lb (91 kg)	2004-01-15	Port McNeill, British Columbia	Alberni Valley Bulldogs (BCHL)	—
21	(United States)	Caden Cranston	Freshman	F	5' 10" (1.78 m)	174 lb (79 kg)	2004-03-23	Rochester, New York	Surrey Eagles (BCHL)	—
22	(United States)	Michael Citara	Senior	F	5' 10" (1.78 m)	160 lb (73 kg)	2002-04-22	New Hope, Pennsylvania	Providence (HEA)	—
23	(United States)	Antonio Venuto (C)	Graduate	F	6' 3" (1.91 m)	215 lb (98 kg)	2000-02-26	Whitmore Lake, Michigan	Ferris State (CCHA)	—
24	(Czech Republic)	Josef Myšák	Graduate	D	6' 3" (1.91 m)	215 lb (98 kg)	1999-09-08	Litvínov, Czech Republic	Niagara (AHA)	—
25	(United States)	Luke Weilandt	Sophomore	F	5' 10" (1.78 m)	181 lb (82 kg)	2002-04-04	Northbrook, Illinois	Wenatchee Wild (BCHL)	—
26	(Sweden)	Ivan Zivlak	Senior	D	6' 2" (1.88 m)	190 lb (86 kg)	2002-08-08	Gislaved, Sweden	Linköping J20 (J20 Nationell)	—
28	(United States)	Ryan O'Connell	Freshman	F	5' 10" (1.78 m)	187 lb (85 kg)	2003-10-23	Moorestown, New Jersey	Cedar Rapids RoughRiders (USHL)	—
29	(Canada)	Caelan Fitzpatrick	Freshman	F	5' 11" (1.8 m)	185 lb (84 kg)	2003-06-17	Moose Jaw, Saskatchewan	Brooks Bandits (BCHL)	—
34	(Sweden)	Nils Wallström	Sophomore	G	6' 3" (1.91 m)	185 lb (84 kg)	2003-10-15	Skellefteå, Sweden	American International (AHA)	—
35	(United States)	Ryan Keyes	Freshman	G	6' 2" (1.88 m)	172 lb (78 kg)	2003-04-25	Fairbanks, Alaska	South Shore Kings (NCDC)	—
37	(United States)	Zach Bookman	Junior	D	5' 10" (1.78 m)	175 lb (79 kg)	2002-03-29	Syracuse, New York	Brooks Bandits (AJHL)	—
43	(Canada)	Ty Daneault	Sophomore	F	5' 11" (1.8 m)	192 lb (87 kg)	2004-12-20	Red Deer, Alberta	Drumheller Dragons (AJHL)	—
47	(Sweden)	Max Lundgren	Freshman	G	6' 5" (1.96 m)	229 lb (104 kg)	2002-04-03	Ängelholm, Sweden	Des Moines Buccaneers (USHL)	—
55	(United States)	Colby Enns	Graduate (RS)	D	6' 2" (1.88 m)	201 lb (91 kg)	1999-09-16	Minot, North Dakota	Northern Michigan (CCHA)	—
62	(United States)	Michael Emerson	Sophomore	F	6' 1" (1.85 m)	190 lb (86 kg)	2003-11-26	Yorktown Heights, New York	Chicago Steel (USHL)	CAR, 190th overall 2023
72	(Canada)	Hunter Wallace	Freshman	F	5' 7" (1.7 m)	165 lb (75 kg)	2003-05-02	Oak Lake, Manitoba	Brooks Bandits (BCHL)	—

== Standings ==
2024–25 Hockey East Standings
	Conference record										Overall record					
	GP	W	L	T	OTW	OTL	SW	PTS	GF	GA	GP	W	L	T	GF	GA
#4 Boston College †	24	18	4	2	2	0	1	55	82	40	37	27	8	2	125	65
#8 Maine *	24	13	5	6	1	1	5	50	67	45	38	24	8	6	124	75
#2 Boston University	24	14	8	2	1	1	2	46	89	65	40	24	14	2	150	119
#7 Connecticut	24	12	8	4	3	2	1	40	76	65	39	23	12	4	130	97
#13 Providence	24	11	8	5	2	2	1	39	65	67	37	21	11	5	103	96
#10 Massachusetts	24	10	9	5	0	0	2	37	69	58	40	21	14	5	133	97
Massachusetts Lowell	24	8	13	3	0	1	2	30	57	69	36	16	16	4	93	101
Merrimack	24	9	14	1	1	0	1	28	57	81	35	13	21	1	81	112
Northeastern	24	7	14	3	1	1	2	26	48	71	37	14	20	3	88	112
New Hampshire	24	5	14	5	0	2	1	23	53	73	35	13	16	6	96	100
Vermont	24	6	16	2	2	3	1	22	59	88	35	11	21	3	100	116
Championship: March 21, 2025 † indicates regular season champion * indicates conference tournament champion (Lamoriello Trophy); Rankings: USCHO Division I Men's Poll

== Schedule and results ==
Date	Time	Opponent^{#}	Rank^{#}	Site	TV	Decision	Result	Attendance	Record
Exhibition
October 5	7:00 pm	Sacred Heart*		J. Thom Lawler Rink • North Andover, Massachusetts (Exhibition)	ESPN+	Keyes	W 3–2	1,974	
Regular Season
October 6	7:00 pm	Stonehill*		J. Thom Lawler Rink • North Andover, Massachusetts	ESPN+	Marquis	L 2–3 ^{OT}	1,989	0–1–0
October 11	8:07 pm	at #19 Minnesota State*		Mayo Clinic Health System Event Center • Mankato, Minnesota	Midco Sports+	Lundgren	W 1–0	4,005	1–1–0
October 12	8:07 pm	at #19 Minnesota State*		Mayo Clinic Health System Event Center • Mankato, Minnesota	Midco Sports+	Lundgren	L 1–4	4,053	1–2–0
October 18	7:00 pm	New Hampshire		J. Thom Lawler Rink • North Andover, Massachusetts	ESPN+	Keyes	T 0–0 ^{SOW}	2,476	1–2–1 (0–0–1)
October 26	7:00 pm	Massachusetts Lowell		J. Thom Lawler Rink • North Andover, Massachusetts	ESPN+	Keyes	L 3–6	2,531	1–3–1 (0–1–1)
November 1	7:30 pm	at #7 Maine		Alfond Arena • Orono, Maine	ESPN+	Lundgren	L 0–5	4,585	1–4–1 (0–2–1)
November 2	7:30 pm	at #7 Maine		Alfond Arena • Orono, Maine	ESPN+	Wallström	L 0–6	4,796	1–5–1 (0–3–1)
November 8	7:00 pm	Connecticut		J. Thom Lawler Rink • North Andover, Massachusetts	ESPN+	Lundgren	W 4–1	2,401	2–5–1 (1–3–1)
November 9	3:30 pm	at Connecticut		Toscano Family Ice Forum • Storrs, Connecticut	ESPN+	Wallström	W 5–2	2,363	3–5–1 (2–3–1)
November 12	7:00 pm	vs. Stonehill*		Warrior Ice Arena • Brighton, Massachusetts	NEC Front Row	Wallström	L 3–4 ^{OT}	483	3–6–1
November 22	7:00 pm	at #13 Boston University		Agganis Arena • Boston, Massachusetts	ESPN+	Lundgren	L 3–6	4,468	3–7–1 (2–4–1)
Friendship Four
November 29	9:00 am	vs. #13 Boston University		SSE Arena Belfast • Belfast, Northern Ireland (Friendship Four Semifinal)	NESN	Wallström	L 2–6	9,000	3–8–1 (2–5–1)
November 30	10:00 am	vs. Harvard*		SSE Arena Belfast • Belfast, Northern Ireland (Friendship Four Consolation Game)	NESN	Lundgren	L 2–4	9,000	3–9–1
December 6	7:00 pm	Alaska Anchorage*		J. Thom Lawler Rink • North Andover, Massachusetts	ESPN+	Keyes	W 4–2	1,754	4–9–1
December 7	7:00 pm	Alaska Anchorage*		J. Thom Lawler Rink • North Andover, Massachusetts	ESPN+	Lundgren	L 1–3	1,833	4–10–1
December 14	7:00 pm	Northeastern		J. Thom Lawler Rink • North Andover, Massachusetts	ESPN+, NESN	Lundgren	W 4–1	1,717	5–10–1 (3–5–1)
January 3	7:00 pm	at Army*		Tate Rink • West Point, New York	FloHockey	Lundgren	W 5–2	2,179	6–10–1
January 5	2:00 pm	#17 Dartmouth*		J. Thom Lawler Rink • North Andover, Massachusetts	ESPN+	Wallström	W 2–1	2,452	7–10–1
January 10	7:00 pm	at #2 Boston College		Conte Forum • Chestnut Hill, Massachusetts	ESPN+	Wallström	W 5–2	6,073	8–10–1 (4–5–1)
January 11	7:00 pm	#2 Boston College		J. Thom Lawler Rink • North Andover, Massachusetts	ESPN+	Lundgren	L 1–4	2,764	8–11–1 (4–6–1)
January 17	7:00 pm	Massachusetts		J. Thom Lawler Rink • North Andover, Massachusetts	ESPN+	Wallström	W 3–2	2,635	9–11–1 (5–6–1)
January 18	6:00 pm	at Massachusetts		Mullins Center • Amherst, Massachusetts	ESPN+	Lundgren	L 2–5	3,593	9–12–1 (5–7–1)
January 21	7:00 pm	Brown*		J. Thom Lawler Rink • North Andover, Massachusetts	ESPN+	Wallström	L 1–5	1,758	9–13–1
January 25	7:00 pm	at Northeastern		Matthews Arena • Boston, Massachusetts	ESPN+	Lundgren	W 4–3	3,809	10–13–1 (6–7–1)
January 31	7:00 pm	at #20 Massachusetts		Mullins Center • Amherst, Massachusetts	ESPN+	Wallström	L 2–4	5,199	10–14–1 (6–8–1)
February 1	6:00 pm	at #8 Massachusetts Lowell		Tsongas Center • Lowell, Massachusetts	ESPN+	Lundgren	L 2–3	6,006	10–15–1 (6–9–1)
February 7	7:00 pm	#8 Boston University		J. Thom Lawler Rink • North Andover, Massachusetts	ESPN+	Lundgren	W 2–1 ^{OT}	2,701	11–15–1 (7–9–1)
February 8	7:00 pm	at #19 New Hampshire		Whittemore Center • Durham, New Hampshire	ESPN+	Lundgren	W 5–4	4,989	12–15–1 (8–9–1)
February 14	7:00 pm	Vermont		J. Thom Lawler Rink • North Andover, Massachusetts	ESPN+	Lundgren	L 2–4	1,984	12–16–1 (8–10–1)
February 15	7:00 pm	Vermont		J. Thom Lawler Rink • North Andover, Massachusetts	ESPN+	Lundgren	W 4–3	2,031	13–16–1 (9–10–1)
February 28	7:00 pm	at #7 Providence		Schneider Arena • Providence, Rhode Island	ESPN+	Lundgren	L 2–3	2,706	13–17–1 (9–11–1)
March 1	7:00 pm	#7 Providence		J. Thom Lawler Rink • North Andover, Massachusetts	ESPN+	Lundgren	L 1–2	2,439	13–18–1 (9–12–1)
March 6	7:00 pm	Northeastern		J. Thom Lawler Rink • North Andover, Massachusetts	ESPN+	Lundgren	L 1–2	1,877	13–19–1 (9–13–1)
March 8	1:00 pm	at #1 Boston College		Conte Forum • Chestnut Hill, Massachusetts	ESPN+	Wallström	L 0–6	7,063	13–20–1 (9–14–1)
Hockey East Tournament
March 12	7:00 pm	Northeastern*		J. Thom Lawler Rink • North Andover, Massachusetts (Hockey East Opening Round)	ESPN+	Lundgren	L 2–3 ^{2OT}	1,987	13–21–1
*Non-conference game. ^{#}Rankings from USCHO.com Poll. All times are in Eastern Time. Source:

== Scoring statistics ==
Name	Position	Games	Goals	Assists	Points	PIM
Seamus Powell	D	35	5	16	21	2
Caden Cranston	F	35	7	10	17	2
Zach Bookman	D	33	3	14	17	22
Nick Pierre	F	34	5	11	16	8
Caelan Fitzpatrick	C/LW	35	6	9	15	16
Ty Daneault	RW	35	6	9	15	40
Antonio Venuto	RW	35	8	6	14	8
Michael Emerson	RW	32	6	6	12	0
Tyler Young	C	29	6	4	10	40
Josef Myšák	D	34	2	8	10	25
David Sacco	RW	26	9	0	9	37
Ethan Bono	F	33	5	4	9	6
Ivan Zivlak	D	32	3	6	9	6
Harrison Roy	D	35	2	7	9	12
Ryan O'Connell	C	28	1	7	8	18
Luke Weilandt	F	35	1	5	6	14
Trevor Griebel	D/F	25	1	4	5	19
Colby Enns	D	30	0	4	4	10
Hunter Wallace	F	6	2	0	2	0
Vann Yuhas	F	16	2	0	2	21
Nathan King	D	11	0	2	2	2
Michael Citara	RW	9	1	0	1	2
Cameron Kungle	D	32	0	1	1	12
Spencer Marquis	G	1	0	0	0	0
Jordan Hughesman	F	2	0	0	0	0
Ryan Keyes	G	5	0	0	0	0
Nils Wallström	G	11	0	0	0	2
Max Wattvil	D	11	0	0	0	4
Max Lundgren	G	24	0	0	0	0
Bench	–	–	–	–	–	12
Total			81	133	214	330

== Goaltending statistics ==
Name	Games	Minutes	Wins	Losses	Ties	Goals against	Saves	Shut outs	SV %	GAA
Ryan Keyes	5	189:06	1	1	1	7	81	1	.920	2.22
Max Lundgren	24	1326:11	8	13	0	64	638	1	.909	2.90
Spencer Marquis	1	60:31	0	1	0	3	22	0	.880	2.97
Nils Wallström	11	530:42	4	6	0	31	210	0	.871	3.50
Empty Net	-	27:18	-	-	-	7	-	-	-	-
Total	35	2133:48	13	21	1	112	951	2	.895	3.15

== Rankings ==
Poll	Week																											
Poll	Pre	1	2	3	4	5	6	7	8	9	10	11	12	13	14	15	16	17	18	19	20	21	22	23	24	25	26	27 (Final)
USCHO.com	RV	NR	NR	NR	NR	NR	NR	NR	NR	NR	NR	NR	–	NR	NR	NR	NR	NR	NR	NR	NR	NR	NR	NR	NR	NR	–	NR
USA Hockey	NR	NR	NR	NR	NR	NR	NR	NR	NR	NR	NR	NR	–	NR	NR	NR	NR	NR	NR	NR	NR	NR	NR	NR	NR	NR	NR	NR

Note: USCHO did not release a poll in week 12 or 26.
Note: USA Hockey did not release a poll in week 12.
