= Scott Borek =

American ice hockey player and coach

Current position
- Title: Head coach
- Team: Merrimack
- Conference: Hockey East
- Record: 110–136–14 (.450)

Biographical details
- Born: May 25, 1962 (age 64); Swampscott, Massachusetts, U.S.
- Education: Dartmouth College

Playing career
- 1981–1983: Dartmouth
- Position: Wing

Coaching career (HC unless noted)
- 1983–1985: Dartmouth (Student Assistant)
- 1985–1989: Providence (assistant)
- 1989–1991: Brown (assistant)
- 1991–1995: Colby
- 1995–1996: Lake Superior State (Associate)
- 1996–2001: Lake Superior State
- 2001–2002: New England College
- 2002–2015: New Hampshire (Associate)
- 2015–2018: Providence (Associate)
- 2018–present: Merrimack

Head coaching record
- Overall: 233–262–36 (.473)
- Tournaments: 0–2 (.000)

Accomplishments and honors

Championships
- 2026 Hockey East men's tournament Champion

Awards
- CCHA Coach of the Year (2000)

Scott Gordon Borek (born May 25, 1962) is an American ice hockey player and coach who has been involved with college hockey for over 35 years. Currently, Borek is the head coach at Merrimack College.

== Career ==
Borek started his college playing career at Dartmouth in 1981 and had nearly tripled his point production in his sophomore season when a neck injury forced him to end his playing days prematurely. He remained a member of the Big Green by becoming a student assistant the following year and after graduating with a degree in English. He became a full-time coach with Providence becoming his next stop. After seven years in Rhode Island (3 with the Friars and 4 more with Brown) got his first head coaching gig with Division III Colby. Coaching the team for 3 years and finishing as a finalist for the Division III Coach of the Year award in 1994 after leading the team to a 13-9-2 record. After the 1994–95 season Borek was back at the Division I level as an associate coach for Lake Superior State and then head coach a year later.

Borek was taking over from Jeff Jackson after a brief but historic career that saw the Lakers win two national titles in three years. Predictably the results weren't as great as they had been under his old boss but after five years the team appeared to be mired in mediocrity. He would be named CCHA Coach of the Year during the 1999–00 season after leading the team to a 17-9-2 conference record and a overall record of 18-16-2. But he was ultimately fired following the 2001 season. After a year behind the bench at New England College Borek became an assistant at New Hampshire for Dick Umile. He remained with the Wildcats until 2015 when he returned to his old stomping grounds as an associate coach for Providence.

Borek was hired as the head coach at Merrimack College on April 9, 2018. After 3 losing seasons to start off his tenure with the warriors. Borek would bring the team to their first winning season in 11 years going 19-15-1 overall. But he would one up this the following year during the 2022–23 season as the warriors would go 16-8 in conference play finishing in second place. From here they would make it all the way to the hockey east championship. With a 23-13-1 overall record the team would get a at large bid to the NCAA tournament for the first time in over a decade. Where they would fall to the eventual national champions Quinnipiac.

During the 2023–24 season Borek coached the Warriors to a 13-21-1 overall record and a 6-17-6 conference record. They were defeated by Northeastern in the opening round of the 2024 Hockey East men's ice hockey tournament 4-0. Borek and the Warriors would once again go 13-21-1 the following year in 2024–25 and finished 9-14-1 in conference play. Just like the previous year the Warriors were defeated by Northeastern in the opening round of the 2025 Hockey East men's tournament 3-2 in overtime.

After two unsuccessful seasons Borek and the Warriors would turn things around after starting the 2025–26 season 5-10, they would finish out the regular season strong going on a 12-5-2 run and finished 10-12-2 in hockey east play. Borek led the Warriors to a successful run in 2026 Hockey East men's tournament as they knocked off UMass Lowell 5-3 in the opening round and then beat the #1 seed Providence College 3-2 in overtime to reach the semifinals at the TD Garden for just the fourth time. The Warriors then beat UMass 2-0 in the semifinals to make their third Hockey East championship game appearance. They would defeat UConn in the championship game 2-1, winning their first ever Hockey East tournament championship in program history along with becoming the first ever #8 seed to do so.

== Personal life ==
Borek and his wife, the former Jill McCune they have 7 children together.

Scott's son Gordon was killed in a single-car accident on May 28, 2016. He married Jill McCune on August 18, 2017. Together they have a total of seven children.

== Head coaching record ==
Record table
Season	Team	Overall	Conference	Standing	Postseason
Colby Mules (ECAC East) (1992–1995)
1992–93	Colby	6–17–1	5–17–1		
1993–94	Colby	13-9-2	10–5–2	T–6th	ECAC East Quarterfinals
1994–95	Colby	14-9-2	10–6–1	6th	ECAC East Quarterfinals
Colby:		33–35–5 (.486)	25–28–4		
Lake Superior State Lakers (CCHA) (1996–2001)
1996–97	Lake Superior State	19–14–5	15–8–4	4th	CCHA Quarterfinals
1997–98	Lake Superior State	15–18–4	12–18–4	t-6th	CCHA Quarterfinals
1998–99	Lake Superior State	11–23–4	10–17–3	8th	CCHA Quarterfinals
1999–00	Lake Superior State	18–16–2	17–9–2	t-3rd	CCHA First Round
2000–01	Lake Superior State	13–23–0	8–20–0	12th	
Lake Superior State:		76–94–15 (.451)	62–82–13 (.436)		
New England Pilgrims (ECAC East) (2001–2002)
2001–02	New England College	14–11–2	9–8–2	2nd	ECAC East Semifinals
New England College:		14–11–2 (.556)	9–8–2 (.526)		
Merrimack Warriors (Hockey East) (2018–present)
2018–19	Merrimack	7–24–3	4–18–2	11th	
2019–20	Merrimack	9–22–3	7–14–3	10th	
2020–21	Merrimack	5–11–2	5–11–2	9th	Participation Cancelled
2021–22	Merrimack	19–15–1	13–11–0	T–4th	Hockey East Quarterfinals
2022–23	Merrimack	23–14–1	16–8–0	2nd	NCAA Northeast Regional Semifinal
2023–24	Merrimack	13–21–1	6–17–1	10th	Hockey East First Round
2024–25	Merrimack	13–21–1	9–14–1	8th	Hockey East First Round
2025–26	Merrimack	21–16–2	10–12–2	8th	NCAA Northeast Regional Semifinal
Merrimack:		110–136–14 (.450)	70–105–12 (.406)		
Total:		233–262–36 (.473)			
National champion Postseason invitational champion Conference regular season champion Conference regular season and conference tournament champion Division regular season champion Division regular season and conference tournament champion Conference tournament champion
