= Todd Woodcroft =

Canadian ice hockey coach (born 1972)

Current position
- Title: Head coach
- Team: Dukla Trenčín, Slovakia
- Conference: National League

Biographical details
- Born: August 15, 1972 (age 54); Toronto, Ontario, Canada
- Education: McGill '95; University of Toronto '96

Coaching career (HC unless noted)
- 2000–2005: Minnesota Wild (video coach)
- 2004: Canada (video coach)
- 2005–2006: Washington Capitals (video coach)
- 2006: Belarus (assistant)
- 2006–2008: Washington Capitals (scout)
- 2008–2009: Minnesota Wild (scout)
- 2008–2009: HC Dinamo Minsk (Asst. GM)
- 2009–2013: Los Angeles Kings (scout)
- 2013–2016: Calgary Flames (scout)
- 2013–2014: Belarus (assistant)
- 2014–2015: Switzerland (assistant)
- 2015–2016: Belarus (assistant)
- 2016–2017: Sweden (assistant)
- 2016–2020: Winnipeg Jets (assistant)
- 2020–2023: Vermont
- 2024–2026: EC Kassel Huskies

Head coaching record
- Overall: 20–55–9 (.292)

Accomplishments and honors

Awards
- Gold Medal, 2004 IIHF World Championship (Canada); 2012 Stanley Cup (Los Angeles Kings); Gold Medal, 2017 IIHF World Championship (Sweden)

Todd Woodcroft (born August 15, 1972) is a Canadian ice hockey coach. He is currently Head coach of the Kassel Huskies, Germany men’s ice hockey team since joining the club for the 2024/2025 season.

== Coaching career ==
Woodcroft began coaching by running his own hockey school until joining the Minnesota Wild as a video coach in 2000. During his work with the Wild, Woodcroft also served as a video coach for Team Canada at the 2004 IIHF World Championship, helping the team win a gold medal. From 2006 to 2009, he'd serve in scouting role with the Washington Capitals and Wild respectively, while also serving as an assistant coach for Belarus during the 2006 IIHF World Championship. Woodcroft also served as the assistant general manager and director of player personnel for one season at HC Dinamo Minsk.

From 2009 to 2013, Woodcroft was a scout for the Los Angeles Kings, and was part of the team's 2012 Stanley Cup-winning squad. He joined the Calgary Flames as the director of scouting, while simultaneously coaching for both Belarus and Switzerland during international competition. In 2016, he joined the Winnipeg Jets as an assistant coach under Paul Maurice. Woodcroft would also be on staff for Sweden's 2017 IIHF World Championship Gold medal performance, and during the 2016 World Cup of Hockey.

On April 15, 2020, Woodcroft was named the fifth head coach in University of Vermont history, replacing Kevin Sneddon. Todd Woodcroft accepted the Assistant Coach position at the Swiss National League club EVZ based in Zug, Switzerland on December 23, 2023. He starts on January 01, 2024.

== Personal life ==
Woodcroft comes from a hockey family. His older brother Craig is the head coach at Dinamo Minsk, while younger brother Jay was the head coach of the NHL's Edmonton Oilers between February 2022 and November 2023. Two of his uncles were part of the "Flying Fathers," a traveling hockey team of ordained Catholic priests.

== Head coaching record ==
Record table
Season	Team	Overall	Conference	Standing	Postseason
Vermont Catamounts (Hockey East) (2020–present)
2020–21	Vermont	1–10–2	1–9–2	11th	Hockey East Opening Round
2021–22	Vermont	8–25–2	6–16–2	10th	Hockey East Opening Round
2022–23	Vermont	11–20–5	5–16–3	11th	Hockey East Quarterfinals
Vermont:		20–55–9 (.292)	12–41–7 (.258)		
Total:		20–55–9 (.292)			
National champion Postseason invitational champion Conference regular season champion Conference regular season and conference tournament champion Division regular season champion Division regular season and conference tournament champion Conference tournament champion
