= Steve Wiedler =

American ice hockey player and coach (born 1986)

Current position
- Title: Head coach
- Team: Vermont
- Conference: Hockey East
- Record: 37–61–7 (.299)

Biographical details
- Born: September 15, 1986 (age 40); Farmingville, New York, U.S.
- Education: Elmira College; University of Southern Maine

Playing career
- 2007–2008: Elmira
- 2008–2011: Southern Maine
- 2011–2013: Knoxville Ice Bears
- Position: Defenseman

Coaching career (HC unless noted)
- 2013–2015: Curry (asst.)
- 2015–2020: American International (asst.)
- 2020–2023: Vermont (asst.)
- 2022: Norway U20 (asst.)
- 2023–present: Vermont

Head coaching record
- Overall: 37–61–7 (.299)

Stephen Wiedler (born September 15, 1986) is the head coach for the Vermont Catamounts men's ice hockey team.

== Career ==
After finishing his junior career with the Hudson Valley Eagles, Wiedler began attending Elmira College in the fall of 2007. While he joined the ice hockey team as a freshman, he wasn't able to play in any of their games during the year and subsequently transferred to Southern Maine. Wiedler had a much greater opportunity with the Huskies, though the team did not have much success while he was there. For his senior season, Wiedler was named team captain and graduated with a degree in history. He went on to pursue a professional career afterwards, playing two seasons with the Knoxville Ice Bears, before ending his playing career.

In 2013 Wiedler turned to coaching and returned to the college ranks as an assistant at Curry. After two years, he moved up to Division I, joining American International in the final year of Gary Wright's tenure. He remained with the program when Eric Lang took over and was instrumental in building the team into a successful outfit. Primarily working with the defense, Wiedler helped the team win its first conference championship in 2019 and make the program's fist NCAA tournament appearance the same year. The team was set to repeat that performance in 2020, however, the coronavirus pandemic ended the season before they could finish the job.

That offseason, Wiedler moved on to a similar position at Vermont, joining the staff of the newly hired Todd Woodcroft. The Catamounts had very little success coming out of the pandemic but the team was showing improvement each year. In the summer of 2023 Woodcroft was dismissed following a months-long investigation into inappropriate text messages. The same day, the program announced that Wiedler would serve as interim head coach for the 2023–24 season.

== Statistics ==
=== Regular season and playoffs ===
			Regular season					Playoffs
Season	Team	League	GP	G	A	Pts	PIM	GP	G	A	Pts	PIM
2007–08	Elmira	ECAC West	0	0	0	0	0	—	—	—	—	—
2008–09	Southern Maine	ECAC East	18	1	5	6	10	—	—	—	—	—
2009–10	Southern Maine	ECAC East	26	2	3	5	30	—	—	—	—	—
2010–11	Southern Maine	ECAC East	23	1	3	4	10	—	—	—	—	—
2011–12	Knoxville Ice Bears	SPHL	54	3	11	14	41	5	0	0	0	0
2012–13	Knoxville Ice Bears	SPHL	53	3	3	6	8	4	0	0	0	0
NCAA totals			67	4	11	15	50	—	—	—	—	—
SPHL totals			107	6	14	20	49	9	0	0	0	0

== Head coaching record ==
Record table
Season	Team	Overall	Conference	Standing	Postseason
Vermont Catamounts (Hockey East) (2023–present)
2023–24	Vermont	13–19–3	7–14–3	9th	Hockey East Opening Round
2024–25	Vermont	11–21–3	6–16–2	11th	Hockey East Opening Round
2025–26	Vermont	13–21–1	8–15–1	11th	Hockey East Opening Round
Vermont:		37–61–7	21–45–6		
Total:		37–61–7 (.299)			
National champion Postseason invitational champion Conference regular season champion Conference regular season and conference tournament champion Division regular season champion Division regular season and conference tournament champion Conference tournament champion
