= 2023–24 Providence Friars men's ice hockey season =

Ice hockey season in New England, US

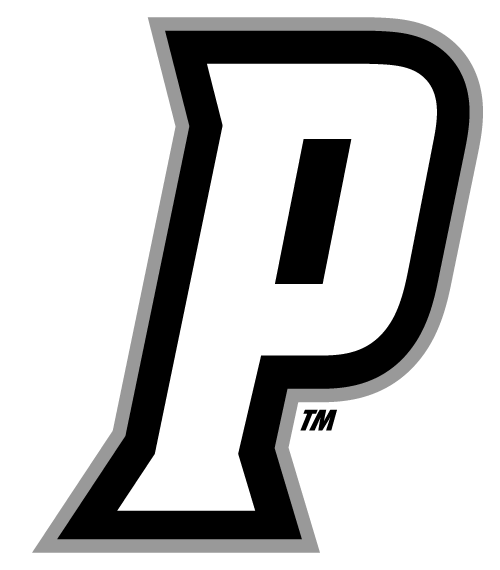
- Conference: 4th Hockey East
- Home ice: Schneider Arena

Rankings
- USCHO: #16
- USA Hockey: #16

Record
- Overall: 18–13–4
- Conference: 11–9–4
- Home: 9–6–3
- Road: 9–7–1

Coaches and captains
- Head coach: Nate Leaman
- Assistant coaches: Ron Rolston; Joel Beal; Joe Palmer
- Captain(s): Cam McDonald; Chase Yoder
- Alternate captain(s): Craig Needham; Nick Poisson

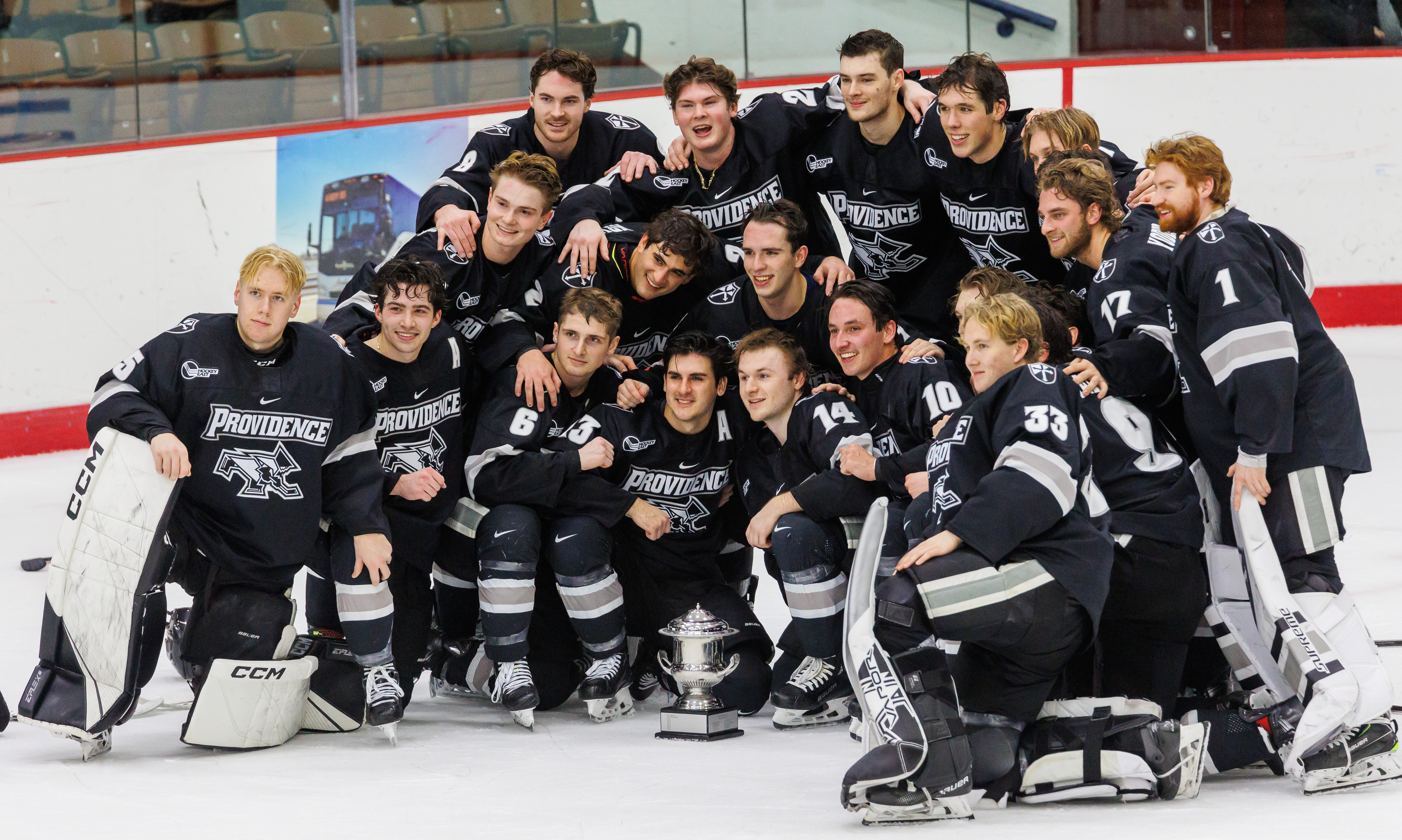
Friars pose with the Mayor's Cup after defeating the Brown Bears 3-0.

The 2023–24 Providence Friars Men's ice hockey season was the 73rd season of play for the program and 40th in Hockey East. The Friars represented Providence College in the 2023–24 NCAA Division I men's ice hockey season, played their home games at Schneider Arena and were coached by Nate Leaman in his 13th season.

== Season ==
Providence began the year with a bit uncertainty as it had lost the top three scorers from the previous season. For a team that was already offensively challenged, that could have been more than they could afford, but the Friars were bent on exceeding their expectations. New starter Philip Svedebäck took to the college game immediately and posted one of the best starts to a career by going 8–1–2 in his first eleven games. In that stretch, the young goaltender allowed just 20 goals and was ranked among the best goaltenders in the nation in just about every category. He was aided, in no small part, by the defense who was the second-most effective in the nation; only Cornell allowed fewer shots against per game and the success of the early season lifted Providence up into the top-5 in the polls. The offense, too, was playing well in the first month and a half; new addition Tanner Adams fit in well with a diverse group that scored by committee rather than concentrate all of its firepower on one line.

However, just before Thanksgiving, The Friars went through their first rough patch of the season. Going through a stretch of five games against ranked opponents, Providence lost four of those matches, however, due to the strength of their opposition, Providence only slipped a few places in the rankings and they were still a top-10 team by the winter break.

In the five weeks after returning from their vacation, Providence posted a solid record and largely held their position. However, cracks were beginning to form in the team. Svedebäck had started showing some inconsistence in his game; he posted three shutouts in that stretch but also had a couple of bad games as well. The offense was mostly effective but began to falter in February. The scoring never went away but it definitely ebbed as the season progressed towards the playoffs. The Friars lack of offense began to cost the team and they were losing games even when Svedebäck was playing well. However, at the beginning of March, the team was still in the top 10 in the PairWise and all they had to do was win a game or two to guarantee themselves a spot in the NCAA tournament. Losses to Merrimack and Boston University were not offset by a tie with Northeastern and on the final week of the regular season, the Friars dropped from 10th to 14th.

Now on the very edge of the playoff picture (14 was the bare minimum for any chance at an at-large bid), Providence would have to face Massachusetts in the quarterfinals with both teams fighting for their lives. The Friars and Minutemen were bunched up in the mid-teens and, because several teams from other conference were also rated about the same, the loser of the game would knocked out of postseason contention. Providence didn't get off to a good start in the game and in less than 5 minutes the Friars were already down by 2 goals. The team desperately tried to climb back into the match but offense was not their strong suit and time ticked away on their season. In the later stages of the third period, UMass got a third goal but then took a penalty immediately afterwards. Svedebäck was pulled to make the power play a 6-on-4 and the extra skater allowed the Friars to score in just 4 seconds. With the faintest of hopes, Providence began to ratchet up their attack on the Massachusetts cage but their comeback was stopped almost as soon as it started. Guillaume Richard took a tripping penalty and forced the team to play defense for 2 critical minutes. Though they managed to kill off the infraction, the momentum had vanished and Providence was unable to conjure up another goal. The 1–3 loss brought the once-promising campaign to a close.

== Departures ==
Player	Position	Nationality	Cause
Brett Berard	Forward	United States	Signed professional contract (New York Rangers)
Michael Citara	Forward	United States	Transferred to Merrimack
Max Crozier	Defenseman	Canada	Graduation (signed with Tampa Bay Lightning)
Chase Dafoe	Forward	United States	Transferred to Alaska
Parker Ford	Forward	United States	Graduation (signed with Winnipeg Jets)
Luke Johnson	Defenseman	United States	Graduate transfer to Robert Morris
Cody Monds	Forward	Canada	Transferred to Clarkson
Patrick Moynihan	Forward	United States	Graduate transfer to Notre Dame
Grant Porter	Forward	United States	Transferred to Canisius
Austin Roden	Goaltender	Canada	Graduate transfer to Clarkson
Uula Ruikka	Defenseman	Finland	Transferred to Augustana
Garrett Sundquist	Defenseman	United States	Transferred to Sacred Heart

== Recruiting ==
Player	Position	Nationality	Age	Notes
Tanner Adams	Forward	United States	18	Northport, NY
Marcus Brännman	Goaltender	Sweden	20	Bromma, SWE
Andrew Centrella	Defenseman	United States	19	Philadelphia, PA
Graham Gamache	Forward	Canada	21	Edmonton, AB
Matt Hubbarde	Forward	Canada	23	Pickering, ON; transfer from Dartmouth
Cal Kiefiuk	Forward	United States	23	Macomb, MI; graduate transfer from Massachusetts
Luke Krys	Defenseman	United States	23	Weston, MA; graduate transfer from Brown
Clint Levens	Forward	United States	20	Windermere, FL
Hudson Malinoski	Forward	Canada	19	Saskatoon, SK; selected 153rd overall in 2023
Austen May	Defenseman	United States	20	Woodhaven, MI
Samo Meritähti	Forward	Finland	21	Seinäjoki, FIN; joined-midseason while recovering from season-ending injury

== Roster ==
As of September 26, 2023.

No.	Nat.	Player	Class	Pos	Height	Weight	DoB	Hometown	Previous team	NHL rights
1	(United States)	John Driscoll	Junior	G	5' 11" (1.8 m)	170 lb (77 kg)	2000-04-09	Milton, Massachusetts	Northeast Generals (NA3HL)	—
2	(United States)	Luke Krys	Graduate	D	6' 2" (1.88 m)	185 lb (84 kg)	2000-09-27	Ridgefield, Connecticut	Brown (ECAC)	—
4	(Canada)	Guillaume Richard	Junior	D	6' 2" (1.88 m)	175 lb (79 kg)	2003-02-10	Cap-Santé, Quebec	Tri-City Storm (USHL)	CBJ, 101st overall 2021
6	(United States)	Cam McDonald (C)	Graduate	D	5' 9" (1.75 m)	175 lb (79 kg)	2001-02-03	Eagle River, Alaska	Muskegon Lumberjacks (USHL)	—
8	(United States)	Riley Duran	Junior	F	6' 2" (1.88 m)	180 lb (82 kg)	2002-01-25	Woburn, Massachusetts	Youngstown Phantoms (USHL)	BOS, 182nd overall 2020
9	(Canada)	Hudson Malinoski	Freshman	F	6' 1" (1.85 m)	184 lb (83 kg)	2004-05-19	Saskatoon, Saskatchewan	Brooks Bandits (AJHL)	TOR, 153rd overall 2023
10	(United States)	Brady Berard	Sophomore	F	6' 1" (1.85 m)	198 lb (90 kg)	2004-02-26	East Greenwich, Rhode Island	USNTDP (USHL)	—
11	(Canada)	Graham Gamache	Freshman	F	5' 11" (1.8 m)	179 lb (81 kg)	2002-06-11	Edmonton, Alberta	Tri-City Storm (USHL)	—
12	(Canada)	Nick Poisson (A)	Senior	F	5' 11" (1.8 m)	185 lb (84 kg)	2001-08-15	Vancouver, British Columbia	Prince George Spruce Kings (BCHL)	—
13	(United States)	Craig Needham (A)	Graduate	F	5' 10" (1.78 m)	180 lb (82 kg)	1999-03-31	Medford, Massachusetts	Youngstown Phantoms (USHL)	—
14	(United States)	Cal Kiefiuk	Graduate	F	5' 10" (1.78 m)	185 lb (84 kg)	2000-02-28	Macomb, Michigan	Massachusetts (HEA)	—
15	(Sweden)	Liam Valente	Sophomore	F	5' 11" (1.8 m)	183 lb (83 kg)	2003-05-23	Märsta, Sweden	Linköping J20 (J20 Nationell)	—
17	(United States)	Chase Yoder (C)	Senior	F	5' 11" (1.8 m)	185 lb (84 kg)	2002-05-28	Fairview, Texas	USNTDP (USHL)	PIT, 170th overall 2020
18	(Canada)	Jamie Engelbert	Graduate	F	6' 4" (1.93 m)	205 lb (93 kg)	2000-06-21	Cobourg, Ontario	Cobourg Cougars (OJHL)	—
19	(United States)	Tanner Adams	Freshman	F	5' 11" (1.8 m)	185 lb (84 kg)	2005-09-02	Northport, New York	Tri-City Storm (USHL)	—
20	(United States)	Andrew Centrella	Freshman	D	5' 9" (1.75 m)	177 lb (80 kg)	2004-01-29	Philadelphia, Pennsylvania	Youngstown Phantoms (USHL)	—
21	(Canada)	Matt Hubbarde	Junior	F	6' 1" (1.85 m)	190 lb (86 kg)	2000-04-15	Pickering, Ontario	Dartmouth (ECAC)	—
22	(United States)	Clint Levens	Freshman	F	6' 2" (1.88 m)	189 lb (86 kg)	2003-06-19	Windermere, Florida	Sioux Falls Stampede (USHL)	—
23	(United States)	Bennett Schimek	Sophomore	F	6' 0" (1.83 m)	188 lb (85 kg)	2003-04-15	Mendota Heights, Minnesota	Sioux City Musketeers (USHL)	—
24	(United States)	Austen May	Sophomore	D	5' 11" (1.8 m)	160 lb (73 kg)	2003-05-19	Woodhaven, Michigan	Sioux Falls Stampede (USHL)	—
25	(United States)	Connor Kelley	Senior	D	6' 1" (1.85 m)	190 lb (86 kg)	2002-01-30	Maple Grove, Minnesota	Minnesota Duluth (NCHC)	CHI, 204th overall 2021
27	(Canada)	Taige Harding	Junior	D	6' 7" (2.01 m)	230 lb (104 kg)	2002-01-03	St. Albert, Alberta	Fort McMurray Oil Barons (AJHL)	CHI, 91st overall 2021
28	(Czech Republic)	Jaroslav Chmelař	Sophomore	F	6' 4" (1.93 m)	216 lb (98 kg)	2003-07-20	Nové Město nad Metují, Czech Republic	Jokerit U20 (U20 SM-sarja)	NYR, 144th overall 2021
29	(United States)	Will Schimek	Junior	D	6' 2" (1.88 m)	200 lb (91 kg)	2001-05-22	Mendota Heights, Minnesota	Sioux Falls Stampede (USHL)	—
33	(Sweden)	Marcus Brännman	Freshman	G	5' 11" (1.8 m)	166 lb (75 kg)	2003-04-06	Bromma, Sweden	Dubuque Fighting Saints (USHL)	—
35	(Sweden)	Philip Svedebäck	Freshman	G	6' 4" (1.93 m)	210 lb (95 kg)	2002-05-28	Växjö, Sweden	Dubuque Fighting Saints (USHL)	BOS, 117th overall 2021

== Standings ==
2023–24 Hockey East Standings
	Conference record										Overall record					
	GP	W	L	T	OTW	OTL	SW	PTS	GF	GA	GP	W	L	T	GF	GA
#2 Boston College †*	24	20	3	1	1	0	1	61	105	56	41	34	6	1	183	89
#3 Boston University	24	18	4	2	1	1	1	57	104	53	40	28	10	2	163	97
#10 Maine	24	14	9	1	0	1	0	44	76	67	37	23	12	2	119	94
#16 Providence	24	11	9	4	3	1	2	37	66	58	35	18	13	4	100	83
#13 Massachusetts	24	12	10	2	4	2	0	36	57	62	37	20	14	3	108	105
#20 New Hampshire	24	12	11	1	1	0	0	36	69	56	36	20	15	1	106	90
Northeastern	24	9	14	1	1	3	0	30	65	71	36	17	16	3	113	97
Connecticut	24	9	14	1	1	1	1	29	49	77	36	15	19	2	90	105
Vermont	24	7	14	3	1	0	3	26	52	81	35	13	19	3	87	106
Merrimack	24	6	17	1	0	1	1	21	62	85	35	13	21	1	98	114
Massachusetts Lowell	24	4	17	3	1	4	0	18	39	78	36	8	24	4	72	113
Championship: March 23, 2024 † indicates regular season champion * indicates conference tournament champion (Lamoriello Trophy); Rankings: USCHO Division I Men's Poll

== Schedule and results ==
Date	Time	Opponent^{#}	Rank^{#}	Site	TV	Decision	Result	Attendance	Record
Regular Season
October 7	7:00 pm	at #2 Michigan*	#18	Yost Ice Arena • Ann Arbor, Michigan	BTN+	Svedebäck	W 4–2	5,800	1–0–0
October 8	4:00 pm	at #2 Michigan*	#18	Yost Ice Arena • Ann Arbor, Michigan	BTN	Svedebäck	L 4–5	5,419	1–1–0
October 13	7:00 pm	Stonehill*	#13	Schneider Arena • Providence, Rhode Island	ESPN+	Svedebäck	W 7–1	2,969	2–1–0
October 20	7:00 pm	#2 Denver*	#10	Schneider Arena • Providence, Rhode Island	ESPN+	Svedebäck	W 4–3	3,465	3–1–0
October 21	7:00 pm	Rensselaer*	#10	Schneider Arena • Providence, Rhode Island	ESPN+	Svedebäck	W 4–2	2,026	4–1–0
October 27	7:00 pm	Vermont	#7	Schneider Arena • Providence, Rhode Island	ESPN+	Svedebäck	W 4–1	2,074	5–1–0 (1–0–0)
October 28	7:00 pm	Vermont	#7	Schneider Arena • Providence, Rhode Island	ESPN+	Svedebäck	T 2–2 ^{SOL}	1,727	5–1–1 (1–0–1)
November 3	7:00 pm	at #15 New Hampshire	#7	Whittemore Center • Durham, New Hampshire	ESPN+	Svedebäck	T 1–1 ^{SOW}	6,501	5–1–2 (1–0–2)
November 4	7:00 pm	#15 New Hampshire	#7	Schneider Arena • Providence, Rhode Island	ESPN+	Svedebäck	W 2–0	2,850	6–1–2 (2–0–2)
November 10	7:00 pm	Northeastern	#5	Schneider Arena • Providence, Rhode Island	ESPN+	Svedebäck	W 2–1 ^{OT}	2,914	7–1–2 (3–0–2)
November 11	7:00 pm	at Northeastern	#5	Matthews Arena • Boston, Massachusetts	ESPN+	Svedebäck	W 5–2	3,391	8–1–2 (4–0–2)
November 16	7:00 pm	#15 Massachusetts	#5	Schneider Arena • Providence, Rhode Island	ESPN+	Svedebäck	L 2–3	2,828	8–2–2 (4–1–2)
November 18	4:00 pm	at #15 Massachusetts	#5	Mullins Center • Amherst, Massachusetts	ESPN+	Svedebäck	L 1–2 ^{OT}	4,670	8–3–2 (4–2–2)
November 24	9:00 pm	at #13 Arizona State*	#9	Mullett Arena • Tempe, Arizona		Svedebäck	L 3–4 ^{OT}	4,990	8–4–2
November 25	3:00 pm	at #13 Arizona State*	#9	Mullett Arena • Tempe, Arizona		Svedebäck	W 2–1	4,626	9–4–2
December 9	4:30 pm	at #2т Boston College	#9	Conte Forum • Chestnut Hill, Massachusetts	ESPN+, NESN	Svedebäck	L 4–5	7,884	9–5–2 (4–3–2)
December 30	7:00 pm	at Brown*	#10	Meehan Auditorium • Providence, Rhode Island (Mayor's Cup)	ESPN+	Svedebäck	W 3–0	1,524	10–5–2
January 12	7:00 pm	at #1 Boston College	#9	Conte Forum • Chestnut Hill, Massachusetts	ESPN+	Svedebäck	L 1–7	7,489	10–6–2 (4–4–2)
January 13	6:00 pm	#1 Boston College	#9	Schneider Arena • Providence, Rhode Island	ESPN+	Svedebäck	W 4–3	2,904	11–6–2 (5–4–2)
January 19	7:00 pm	Alaska Anchorage*	#9	Schneider Arena • Providence, Rhode Island	ESPN+	Svedebäck	W 2–0	2,365	12–6–2
January 20	7:00 pm	Alaska Anchorage*	#9	Schneider Arena • Providence, Rhode Island	ESPN+	Svedebäck	L 0–4	2,415	12–7–2
January 26	7:15 pm	at Massachusetts Lowell	#10	Tsongas Center • Lowell, Massachusetts	ESPN+	Svedebäck	W 7–2	5,929	13–7–2 (6–4–2)
January 27	7:00 pm	Massachusetts Lowell	#10	Schneider Arena • Providence, Rhode Island	ESPN+	Svedebäck	W 4–3 ^{OT}	2,270	14–7–2 (7–4–2)
February 2	7:00 pm	at Connecticut	#10	Toscano Family Ice Forum • Storrs, Connecticut	ESPN+	Svedebäck	W 5–0	2,691	15–7–2 (8–4–2)
February 3	7:00 pm	Connecticut	#10	Schneider Arena • Providence, Rhode Island	ESPN+	Svedebäck	L 1–2	2,870	15–8–2 (8–5–2)
February 9	7:00 pm	at #7 Maine	#10	Alfond Arena • Orono, Maine	ESPN+	Svedebäck	L 1–2	5,043	15–9–2 (8–6–2)
February 10	7:00 pm	at #7 Maine	#10	Alfond Arena • Orono, Maine	ESPN+	Svedebäck	W 4–3 ^{OT}	4,745	16–9–2 (9–6–2)
February 16	7:00 pm	#3 Boston University	#10	Schneider Arena • Providence, Rhode Island	ESPN+	Svedebäck	T 2–2 ^{SOW}	2,865	16–9–3 (9–6–3)
February 17	6:00 pm	at #3 Boston University	#10	Agganis Arena • Boston, Massachusetts	ESPN+	Svedebäck	L 2–5	5,856	16–10–3 (9–7–3)
February 24	6:05 pm	at Massachusetts Lowell	#12	Tsongas Center • Lowell, Massachusetts	ESPN+	Svedebäck	W 2–1	5,342	17–10–3 (10–7–3)
February 29	7:00 pm	at Merrimack	#10	J. Thom Lawler Rink • North Andover, Massachusetts	ESPN+	Svedebäck	W 4–2	1,832	18–10–3 (11–7–3)
March 1	6:00 pm	Merrimack	#10	Schneider Arena • Providence, Rhode Island	ESPN+	Svedebäck	L 1–2	2,017	18–11–3 (11–8–3)
March 7	7:00 pm	#2 Boston University	#11	Schneider Arena • Providence, Rhode Island	ESPN+	Svedebäck	L 2–4	2,498	18–12–3 (11–9–3)
March 9	4:00 pm	Northeastern	#11	Schneider Arena • Providence, Rhode Island	ESPN+	Svedebäck	T 3–3 ^{SOW}	2,165	18–12–4 (11–9–4)
Hockey East Tournament
March 16	7:00 pm	#16 Massachusetts*	#13	Schneider Arena • Providence, Rhode Island (Quarterfinal)	ESPN+, NESN+	Svedebäck	L 1–3	2,644	18–13–4
*Non-conference game. ^{#}Rankings from USCHO.com Poll. All times are in Eastern Time. Source:

== Scoring statistics ==
Name	Position	Games	Goals	Assists	Points	PIM
Nick Poisson	F	35	9	15	24	16
Tanner Adams	C/RW	35	6	15	21	6
Chase Yoder	C	35	11	9	20	26
Hudson Malinoski	C	35	9	9	18	29
Guillaume Richard	D	35	3	15	18	27
Bennett Schimek	F	34	8	9	17	6
Luke Krys	D	35	6	11	17	16
Riley Duran	C	35	9	7	16	18
Jaroslav Chmelař	LW/RW	26	5	10	15	29
Graham Gamache	F	35	6	8	14	8
Austen May	D	30	4	9	13	4
Connor Kelley	D	34	1	11	12	12
Jamie Engelbert	C	28	7	4	11	16
Craig Needham	C	34	4	7	11	31
Cal Kiefiuk	F	25	2	8	10	24
Liam Valente	C/LW	29	4	5	9	10
Brady Berard	C	27	2	6	8	16
Taige Harding	D	34	2	6	8	12
Cam McDonald	D	29	1	6	7	8
Andrew Centrella	D	18	0	3	3	0
Clint Levens	C	24	0	3	3	31
Matt Hubbarde	C	13	1	0	1	2
Marcus Brännman	G	2	0	0	0	2
Philip Svedebäck	G	35	0	0	0	0
Total			100	176	276	359

== Goaltending statistics ==
Name	Games	Minutes	Wins	Losses	Ties	Goals against	Saves	Shut outs	SV %	GAA
Philip Svedebäck	35	2072:21	18	13	4	80	717	4	.900	2.32
Marcus Brännman	5	44:51	0	0	0	3	9	0	.750	4.01
Empty Net	-	13:18	-	-	-	0	-	-	-	-
Total	35	2130:30	18	13	4	83	726	4	.897	2.34

== Rankings ==
Poll	Week																										
Poll	Pre	1	2	3	4	5	6	7	8	9	10	11	12	13	14	15	16	17	18	19	20	21	22	23	24	25	26 (Final)
USCHO.com	18	13	10	7 (1)	7 (2)	5 (1)	5 (3)	9	9	9	10	–	9	9	9	10	10	10	10	12	10	11	13	16	16	–	16
USA Hockey	20	15	12	8	9	6	5 (1)	9	9	10	11	11	–	9	9	11	10	13	11	11	10	10	14	16	16	16	16

Note: USCHO did not release a poll in weeks 11 and 25.
Note: USA Hockey did not release a poll in week 12.

== 2024 NHL entry draft ==
Round	Pick	Player	NHL team
1	19	Trevor Connelly ^{†}	Vegas Golden Knights
3	67	John Mustard ^{†}	Chicago Blackhawks
3	78	Logan Sawyer ^{†}	Montreal Canadiens

† incoming freshman
