= 2023–24 Merrimack Warriors men's ice hockey season =

Turkey Leg Classic, Champion
- Conference: 10th Hockey East
- Home ice: J. Thom Lawler Rink

Rankings
- USCHO: NR
- USA Hockey: NR

Record
- Overall: 13–21–1
- Conference: 6–16–1
- Home: 7–9–1
- Road: 6–12–0

Coaches and captains
- Head coach: Scott Borek
- Assistant coaches: Dan Jewell; Chris Ross
- Captain: Ben Brar
- Alternate captain: Mac Welsher

The 2023–24 Merrimack Warriors Men's ice hockey season was the 68th season of play for the program, the 35th at the Division I level, and the 35th in Hockey East. The Warriors represented Merrimack College, played their home games at the J. Thom Lawler Rink and were coached by Scott Borek, in his sixth season.

== Season ==
Coming off of its first NCAA tournament appearance in twelve years, Merrimack entered the year with some expectations for its program. Though the team had lost several depth players to graduation, the Warriors returned the top three forwards as well as both of their starting goaltender. However, just before the opening game, Alex Jefferies was injured in practice and missed the first month of the season. Without their leading scorer, the team was unable to do much offensively against Arizona State but the Warriors soon recovered and posted three solid wins to finish out October.

Once Jefferies returned in early November, the team was hoping to continue their upwards trend but the goaltending gave out. Over a six-game stretch, Merrimack lost four 1-goal games with neither netminder finding much consistency. The Warriors recovered a bit over Thanksgiving, winning two matches against weak Atlantic Hockey teams, but ended the first half of their season with three consecutive losses. Both Zachary Borgiel and Hugo Ollas were struggling to keep the puck out of the net and coach Borek had no option but to hope at least one of his goaltenders would recover their form from '23.

Merrimack was able to pick itself up after the winter break when Borgiel strung three solid games together and lifted the Warriors record back to .500. Ollas joined in to help earn a split against #13 Massachusetts in the middle of January, however, Jefferies went back on the shelf after the second match and was out of the lineup for three weeks. Merrimack lost every game that their top forward missed and when he returned the team was well and truly out of the race. Borgiel's play had also degraded to the point that the goaltending rotation was ended in mid-February with Ollas taking over for the remainder of the season. Merrimack was able to salvage what was left of their season and play even in the final few weeks but that only saved the team from finishing last in the standings.

With an abysmal record in conference, the Warriors were going to have to run through a gauntlet of strong teams if they wanted to reach the tournament once more. However, the team was unable to surmount even their first challenge. Northeastern shut down the Merrimack offense, blacking the team for the first time since the opening game and swiftly ended the Warriors' season.

== Departures ==
| Player | Position | Nationality | Cause |
|---|---|---|---|
| Will Calverley | Forward | Canada | Graduation (signed with Florida Everblades) |
| Tristan Crozier | Forward | Canada | Graduation (signed with Tulsa Oilers) |
| Slava Demin | Defenseman | United States | Graduation (retired) |
| Hugo Esselin | Forward | Sweden | Graduation (retired) |
| Filip Karlsson Tägtström | Forward | Sweden | Signed professional contract (Tyresö/Hanviken) |
| Ryan Leibold | Forward | United States | Graduation (signed with South Carolina Stingrays) |
| Ottoville Leppänen | Forward | Finland | Graduation (signed with Orlando Solar Bears) |
| Mick Messner | Forward | United States | Graduation (signed with Utah Grizzlies) |
| Kevin Sadovski | Defenseman | United States | Left program (retired) |
| Jordan Seyfert | Forward | United States | Graduation (signed with Kalamazoo Wings) |

== Recruiting ==
| Player | Position | Nationality | Age | Notes |
|---|---|---|---|---|
| Liam Cavan | Defenseman | Canada | 21 | Gloucester, ON |
| Michael Citara | Forward | United States | 21 | New Hope, PA; transfer from Providence |
| Ty Daneault | Forward | Canada | 18 | Red Deer, AB |
| Frank Djurasevic | Defenseman | United States | 21 | New Rochelle, NY |
| Brady Hunter | Forward | Canada | 21 | Enfield, NS |
| David Sacco | Forward | United States | 21 | Middleton, MA |
| Max Wattvil | Defenseman | Sweden | 21 | Stockholm, SWE |
| Luke Weilandt | Forward | United States | 21 | Northbrook, IL |

== Roster ==
As of September 26, 2023.

| No. | Nat. | Player | Class | Pos | Height | Weight | DoB | Hometown | Previous team | NHL rights |
|---|---|---|---|---|---|---|---|---|---|---|
| 1 | (Sweden) | Hugo Ollas | Junior | G | 6' 8" (2.03 m) | 253 lb (115 kg) | 2002-04-24 | Linköping, Sweden | Linköping J20 (J20 Nationell) | NYR, 197th overall 2020 |
| 2 | (United States) | Christian Felton | Senior | D | 6' 1" (1.85 m) | 185 lb (84 kg) | 2000-02-04 | Medina, Ohio | Bentley (AHA) | — |
| 4 | (United States) | Mike Brown | Junior | D | 6' 2" (1.88 m) | 202 lb (92 kg) | 2001-04-03 | Belmont, Massachusetts | Youngstown (USHL) | — |
| 5 | (United States) | Trevor Griebel | Sophomore | D | 5' 10" (1.78 m) | 165 lb (75 kg) | 2001-03-07 | Tampa, Florida | Fargo (USHL) | — |
| 7 | (Sweden) | Max Wattvil | Freshman | D | 6' 2" (1.88 m) | 192 lb (87 kg) | 2002-08-11 | Stockholm, Sweden | Minnesota (NAHL) | — |
| 8 | (Canada) | Liam Dennison | Graduate | D | 5' 9" (1.75 m) | 178 lb (81 kg) | 1999-02-07 | Manotick, Ontario | Youngstown (USHL) | — |
| 9 | (Canada) | Brady Hunter | Freshman | F | 5' 8" (1.73 m) | 174 lb (79 kg) | 2002-07-27 | Enfield, Nova Scotia | Trail (BCHL) | — |
| 10 | (Canada) | Mark Hillier | Junior | F | 6' 1" (1.85 m) | 180 lb (82 kg) | 2002-03-18 | Labrador City, Newfoundland and Labrador | Summerside (MHL) | — |
| 11 | (Canada) | Devlin O'Brien | Junior | F | 5' 11" (1.8 m) | 185 lb (84 kg) | 2002-04-05 | Toronto, Ontario | Penticton (BCHL) | — |
| 13 | (Canada) | Chase Stevenson | Graduate | F | 5' 11" (1.8 m) | 180 lb (82 kg) | 1999-01-13 | West Kelowna, British Columbia | New Hampshire (HEA) | — |
| 14 | (United States) | Tyler Young | Sophomore | F | 6' 1" (1.85 m) | 180 lb (82 kg) | 2001-05-08 | Lancaster, Massachusetts | Maryland (NAHL) | — |
| 15 | (United States) | Mark Gallant | Graduate | F | 6' 0" (1.83 m) | 185 lb (84 kg) | 2000-05-01 | Concord, Massachusetts | Dartmouth (ECAC) | — |
| 16 | (Russia) | Nikita Borodayenko | Sophomore | F | 6' 0" (1.83 m) | 180 lb (82 kg) | 2002-06-17 | Dmitrov, Russia | Dubuque (USHL) | — |
| 17 | (United States) | Mac Welsher (A) | Graduate | F | 5' 8" (1.73 m) | 182 lb (83 kg) | 1999-04-24 | Grosse Pointe Farms, Michigan | Des Moines (USHL) | — |
| 18 | (Canada) | Ben Brar (C) | Graduate | F | 6' 2" (1.88 m) | 190 lb (86 kg) | 1998-11-19 | Abbotsford, British Columbia | Prince George (BCHL) | — |
| 19 | (United States) | Alex Jefferies | Senior | F | 6' 0" (1.83 m) | 190 lb (86 kg) | 2001-11-08 | Lunenburg, Massachusetts | The Gunnery (USHS–CT) | NYI, 121st overall 2020 |
| 20 | (Canada) | Ethan Bono | Freshman | F | 6' 3" (1.91 m) | 201 lb (91 kg) | 2004-01-15 | Port McNeill, British Columbia | Alberni Valley (BCHL) | — |
| 21 | (United States) | Matt Copponi | Junior | F | 5' 11" (1.8 m) | 165 lb (75 kg) | 2003-06-04 | Mansfield, Massachusetts | Dexter Southfield (USHS–MA) | EDM, 216th overall 2023 |
| 22 | (United States) | Michael Citara | Junior | F | 5' 10" (1.78 m) | 160 lb (73 kg) | 2002-04-22 | New Hope, Pennsylvania | Providence (HEA) | — |
| 23 | (United States) | Frank Djurasevic | Freshman | D | 6' 2" (1.88 m) | 198 lb (90 kg) | 2002-03-09 | New Rochelle, New York | Penticton (BCHL) | — |
| 24 | (United States) | David Sacco | Freshman | F | 6' 1" (1.85 m) | 194 lb (88 kg) | 2002-01-03 | Middleton, Massachusetts | Alberni Valley (BCHL) | — |
| 25 | (United States) | Luke Weilandt | Freshman | F | 5' 10" (1.78 m) | 181 lb (82 kg) | 2002-04-04 | Northbrook, Illinois | Wenatchee (BCHL) | — |
| 26 | (Sweden) | Ivan Zivlak | Junior | D | 6' 2" (1.88 m) | 190 lb (86 kg) | 2002-08-08 | Gislaved, Sweden | Linköping J20 (J20 Nationell) | — |
| 27 | (Sweden) | Adam Arvedson | Junior | D | 5' 11" (1.8 m) | 169 lb (77 kg) | 2001-08-30 | Karlstad, Sweden | Färjestad (J20 Nationell) | — |
| 28 | (Sweden) | Filip Forsmark | Graduate | F | 5' 11" (1.8 m) | 177 lb (80 kg) | 1998-06-23 | Skövde, Sweden | Tri-City (USHL) | — |
| 29 | (United States) | Zachary Borgiel | Senior | G | 6' 2" (1.88 m) | 212 lb (96 kg) | 2000-04-27 | Fort Gratiot, Michigan | Cowichan Valley (BCHL) | — |
| 37 | (United States) | Zach Bookman | Sophomore | D | 5' 10" (1.78 m) | 175 lb (79 kg) | 2002-03-29 | Syracuse, New York | Brooks (AJHL) | — |
| 43 | (Canada) | Ty Daneault | Freshman | F | 5' 11" (1.8 m) | 192 lb (87 kg) | 2004-12-20 | Red Deer, Alberta | Drumheller (AJHL) | — |

== Standings ==
2023–24 Hockey East Standings
| | Conference record | | | | | | | | | | Overall record | | | | | |
| | GP | W | L | T | OTW | OTL | SW | PTS | GF | GA | GP | W | L | T | GF | GA |
|---|---|---|---|---|---|---|---|---|---|---|---|---|---|---|---|---|
| #2 Boston College †* | 24 | 20 | 3 | 1 | 1 | 0 | 1 | 61 | 105 | 56 | 41 | 34 | 6 | 1 | 183 | 89 |
| #3 Boston University | 24 | 18 | 4 | 2 | 1 | 1 | 1 | 57 | 104 | 53 | 40 | 28 | 10 | 2 | 163 | 97 |
| #10 Maine | 24 | 14 | 9 | 1 | 0 | 1 | 0 | 44 | 76 | 67 | 37 | 23 | 12 | 2 | 119 | 94 |
| #16 Providence | 24 | 11 | 9 | 4 | 3 | 1 | 2 | 37 | 66 | 58 | 35 | 18 | 13 | 4 | 100 | 83 |
| #13 Massachusetts | 24 | 12 | 10 | 2 | 4 | 2 | 0 | 36 | 57 | 62 | 37 | 20 | 14 | 3 | 108 | 105 |
| #20 New Hampshire | 24 | 12 | 11 | 1 | 1 | 0 | 0 | 36 | 69 | 56 | 36 | 20 | 15 | 1 | 106 | 90 |
| Northeastern | 24 | 9 | 14 | 1 | 1 | 3 | 0 | 30 | 65 | 71 | 36 | 17 | 16 | 3 | 113 | 97 |
| Connecticut | 24 | 9 | 14 | 1 | 1 | 1 | 1 | 29 | 49 | 77 | 36 | 15 | 19 | 2 | 90 | 105 |
| Vermont | 24 | 7 | 14 | 3 | 1 | 0 | 3 | 26 | 52 | 81 | 35 | 13 | 19 | 3 | 87 | 106 |
| Merrimack | 24 | 6 | 17 | 1 | 0 | 1 | 1 | 21 | 62 | 85 | 35 | 13 | 21 | 1 | 98 | 114 |
| Massachusetts Lowell | 24 | 4 | 17 | 3 | 1 | 4 | 0 | 18 | 39 | 78 | 36 | 8 | 24 | 4 | 72 | 113 |
Championship: March 23, 2024 † indicates regular season champion * indicates conference tournament champion (Lamoriello Trophy); Rankings: USCHO Division I Men's Poll

== Schedule and results ==
| Date | Time | Opponent^{#} | Rank^{#} | Site | TV | Decision | Result | Attendance | Record |
Exhibition
| October 7 | 2:00 pm | Sacred Heart* | #14 | Martire Family Arena • Fairfield, Connecticut (Exhibition) | FloHockey | Borgiel | W 3–2 ^{OT} | 307 | |
Regular Season
| October 13 | 9:00 pm | at Arizona State* | #15 | Mullett Arena • Tempe, Arizona | | Borgiel | L 0–1 ^{OT} | 4,680 | 0–1–0 |
| October 14 | 7:00 pm | at Arizona State* | #15 | Mullett Arena • Tempe, Arizona | | Ollas | L 2–4 | 4,569 | 0–2–0 |
| October 20 | 7:00 pm | Clarkson* | | J. Thom Lawler Rink • North Andover, Massachusetts | ESPN+ | Borgiel | W 4–1 | 2,947 | 1–2–0 |
| October 22 | 4:00 pm | St. Lawrence* | | J. Thom Lawler Rink • North Andover, Massachusetts | ESPN+ | Ollas | W 5–2 | 2,087 | 2–2–0 |
| October 28 | 4:00 pm | at #18 Northeastern | | Matthews Arena • Boston, Massachusetts | ESPN+ | Borgiel | W 4–1 | 2,132 | 3–2–0 (1–0–0) |
| November 3 | 7:00 pm | #20 Maine | | J. Thom Lawler Rink • North Andover, Massachusetts | ESPN+ | Ollas | L 1–2 | 2,438 | 3–3–0 (1–1–0) |
| November 4 | 7:00 pm | #20 Maine | | J. Thom Lawler Rink • North Andover, Massachusetts | ESPN+ | Borgiel | L 4–5 | 2,189 | 3–4–0 (1–2–0) |
| November 10 | 7:00 pm | at Connecticut | | Toscano Family Ice Forum • Storrs, Connecticut | ESPN+ | Ollas | W 6–3 | 2,630 | 4–4–0 (2–2–0) |
| November 11 | 7:00 pm | Connecticut | | J. Thom Lawler Rink • North Andover, Massachusetts | ESPN+ | Borgiel | L 3–4 | 2,432 | 4–5–0 (2–3–0) |
| November 15 | 7:00 pm | Massachusetts Lowell | | J. Thom Lawler Rink • North Andover, Massachusetts | ESPN+, NESN | Borgiel | T 1–1 ^{SOW} | 2,576 | 4–5–1 (2–3–1) |
| November 18 | 7:00 pm | at Massachusetts Lowell | | Tsongas Center • Lowell, Massachusetts | ESPN+ | Ollas | L 2–3 ^{OT} | 4,867 | 4–6–1 (2–4–1) |
Turkey Leg Classic
| November 24 | 4:00 pm | Army* | | J. Thom Lawler Rink • North Andover, Massachusetts (Turkey Leg Game 1) | ESPN+ | Borgiel | W 7–3 | 2,034 | 5–6–1 |
| November 25 | 4:00 pm | Bentley* | | J. Thom Lawler Rink • North Andover, Massachusetts (Turkey Leg Game 2) | ESPN+ | Ollas | W 4–3 | 1,547 | 6–6–1 |
| December 1 | 7:30 pm | #4 Boston University | | J. Thom Lawler Rink • North Andover, Massachusetts | ESPN+ | Ollas | L 1–4 | 2,734 | 6–7–1 (2–5–1) |
| December 2 | 7:00 pm | at #4 Boston University | | Agganis Arena • Boston, Massachusetts | ESPN+ | Borgiel | L 2–5 | 5,747 | 6–8–1 (2–6–1) |
| December 8 | 7:00 pm | at Yale* | | Ingalls Rink • New Haven, Connecticut | ESPN+ | Ollas | L 2–5 | 1,116 | 6–9–1 |
| December 29 | 7:00 pm | at Brown* | | Meehan Auditorium • Providence, Rhode Island | ESPN+ | Borgiel | W 5–1 | 610 | 7–9–1 |
| December 31 | 2:00 pm | Stonehill* | | J. Thom Lawler Rink • North Andover, Massachusetts | ESPN+ | Borgiel | W 3–2 | 2,038 | 8–9–1 |
| January 2 | 7:00 pm | at Holy Cross* | | Hart Center • Worcester, Massachusetts | FloHockey | Borgiel | W 4–3 ^{OT} | 714 | 9–9–1 |
| January 12 | 7:00 pm | at #13 Massachusetts | | Mullins Center • Amherst, Massachusetts | ESPN+ | Borgiel | L 3–4 | 3,734 | 9–10–1 (2–7–1) |
| January 13 | 7:00 pm | #13 Massachusetts | | J. Thom Lawler Rink • North Andover, Massachusetts | ESPN+ | Ollas | W 4–1 | 2,537 | 10–10–1 (3–7–1) |
| January 19 | 7:00 pm | #2 Boston College | | J. Thom Lawler Rink • North Andover, Massachusetts | ESPN+ | Borgiel | L 4–6 | 2,674 | 10–11–1 (3–8–1) |
| January 21 | 1:00 pm | at #2 Boston College | | Conte Forum • Chestnut Hill, Massachusetts | ESPN+, NESN | Ollas | L 2–6 | 6,640 | 10–12–1 (3–9–1) |
| January 26 | 7:00 pm | at Northeastern | | Matthews Arena • Boston, Massachusetts | ESPN+ | Borgiel | L 3–5 | 2,421 | 10–13–1 (3–10–1) |
| January 27 | 7:00 pm | Northeastern | | J. Thom Lawler Rink • North Andover, Massachusetts | ESPN+ | Ollas | L 1–4 | 2,647 | 10–14–1 (3–11–1) |
| February 2 | 7:00 pm | #11 Massachusetts | | J. Thom Lawler Rink • North Andover, Massachusetts | ESPN+ | Borgiel | L 2–3 | 2,314 | 10–15–1 (3–12–1) |
| February 3 | 7:00 pm | at #18 New Hampshire | | Whittemore Center • Durham, New Hampshire | ESPN+ | Ollas | L 1–3 | 5,080 | 10–16–1 (3–13–1) |
| February 9 | 7:00 pm | at #3 Boston University | | Agganis Arena • Boston, Massachusetts | ESPN+, NESN | Borgiel | L 1–7 | 5,404 | 10–17–1 (3–14–1) |
| February 10 | 7:00 pm | #17 New Hampshire | | J. Thom Lawler Rink • North Andover, Massachusetts | ESPN+ | Ollas | W 3–1 | 2,639 | 11–17–1 (4–14–1) |
| February 16 | 7:00 pm | at Vermont | | Gutterson Fieldhouse • Burlington, Vermont | ESPN+ | Ollas | W 5–2 | 2,270 | 12–17–1 (5–14–1) |
| February 17 | 7:00 pm | at Vermont | | Gutterson Fieldhouse • Burlington, Vermont | ESPN+ | Ollas | L 1–4 | 2,565 | 12–18–1 (5–15–1) |
| February 29 | 7:00 pm | #10 Providence | | J. Thom Lawler Rink • North Andover, Massachusetts | ESPN+ | Ollas | L 2–4 | 1,832 | 12–19–1 (5–16–1) |
| March 1 | 6:00 pm | at #10 Providence | | Schneider Arena • Providence, Rhode Island | ESPN+ | Ollas | W 2–1 | 2,017 | 13–19–1 (6–16–1) |
| March 9 | 7:00 pm | #1 Boston College | | J. Thom Lawler Rink • North Andover, Massachusetts | ESPN+ | Ollas | L 4–6 | 2,747 | 13–20–1 (6–17–1) |
Hockey East Tournament
| March 13 | 7:00 pm | at Northeastern* | | Matthews Arena • Boston, Massachusetts (Opening Round) | ESPN+ | Ollas | L 0–4 | 1,254 | 13–21–1 |
*Non-conference game. ^{#}Rankings from USCHO.com Poll. All times are in Eastern Time. Source:

== Scoring statistics ==
| Name | Position | Games | Goals | Assists | Points | PIM |
|---|---|---|---|---|---|---|
| Matt Copponi | C | 30 | 7 | 25 | 32 | 48 |
| Zach Bookman | D | 33 | 4 | 24 | 28 | 30 |
| Alex Jefferies | LW | 22 | 13 | 10 | 23 | 19 |
| Ty Daneault | RW | 34 | 13 | 8 | 21 | 33 |
| Mark Hillier | F | 35 | 7 | 12 | 19 | 2 |
| Ben Brar | F | 35 | 5 | 14 | 19 | 20 |
| Filip Forsmark | LW/RW | 35 | 5 | 13 | 18 | 25 |
| Michael Citara | RW | 31 | 6 | 9 | 15 | 6 |
| Mac Welsher | C | 30 | 4 | 9 | 13 | 18 |
| Frank Djurasevic | D | 35 | 4 | 6 | 10 | 26 |
| Ethan Bono | F | 29 | 6 | 3 | 9 | 10 |
| Liam Dennison | D | 35 | 2 | 7 | 9 | 10 |
| Devlin O'Brien | LW | 30 | 3 | 5 | 8 | 24 |
| Christian Felton | D | 26 | 3 | 4 | 7 | 4 |
| Trevor Griebel | D/F | 19 | 2 | 4 | 6 | 6 |
| Luke Weilandt | F | 23 | 3 | 2 | 5 | 6 |
| Mark Gallant | F | 33 | 2 | 3 | 5 | 23 |
| Chase Stevenson | F | 15 | 4 | 0 | 4 | 10 |
| Adam Arvedson | D | 21 | 1 | 3 | 4 | 2 |
| Max Wattvil | D | 24 | 2 | 1 | 3 | 14 |
| Ivan Zivlak | D | 24 | 1 | 2 | 3 | 4 |
| David Sacco | RW | 18 | 1 | 1 | 2 | 23 |
| Brady Hunter | C | 11 | 0 | 2 | 2 | 2 |
| Nikita Borodayenko | F | 12 | 0 | 1 | 1 | 4 |
| Tyler Young | RW | 12 | 0 | 1 | 1 | 25 |
| Steven Bacovsky | G | 1 | 0 | 0 | 0 | 0 |
| Zachary Borgiel | G | 16 | 0 | 0 | 0 | 2 |
| Hugo Ollas | G | 22 | 0 | 0 | 0 | 2 |
| Total | | | 98 | 169 | 267 | 412 |

== Goaltending statistics ==
| Name | Games | Minutes | Wins | Losses | Ties | Goals against | Saves | Shut outs | SV % | GAA |
|---|---|---|---|---|---|---|---|---|---|---|
| Hugo Ollas | 21 | 1162:53 | 7 | 12 | 0 | 55 | 540 | 0 | .908 | 2.84 |
| Zachary Borgiel | 17 | 921:36 | 6 | 9 | 1 | 50 | 405 | 0 | .890 | 3.26 |
| Empty Net | - | 25:28 | - | - | - | 9 | - | - | - | - |
| Total | 35 | 2109:57 | 13 | 21 | 1 | 114 | 945 | 0 | .892 | 3.24 |

== Rankings ==
| Poll | Week | | | | | | | | | | | | | | | | | | | | | | | | | | |
| Poll | Pre | 1 | 2 | 3 | 4 | 5 | 6 | 7 | 8 | 9 | 10 | 11 | 12 | 13 | 14 | 15 | 16 | 17 | 18 | 19 | 20 | 21 | 22 | 23 | 24 | 25 | 26 (Final) |
|---|---|---|---|---|---|---|---|---|---|---|---|---|---|---|---|---|---|---|---|---|---|---|---|---|---|---|---|
| USCHO.com | 14 | 15 | NR | NR | NR | NR | NR | NR | NR | NR | NR | – | NR | NR | NR | NR | NR | NR | NR | NR | NR | NR | NR | NR | NR | – | NR |
| USA Hockey | 12 | 13 | NR | 20 | 20т | NR | NR | NR | NR | NR | NR | NR | – | NR | NR | NR | NR | NR | NR | NR | NR | NR | NR | NR | NR | NR | NR |

Note: USCHO did not release a poll in weeks 11 and 25.
Note: USA Hockey did not release a poll in week 12.
