= 2023–24 Northeastern Huskies men's ice hockey season =

Beanpot, Champion
- Conference: 7th Hockey East
- Home ice: Matthews Arena

Rankings
- USCHO: NR
- USA Hockey: NR

Record
- Overall: 17–16–3
- Conference: 9–14–1
- Home: 8–7–1
- Road: 6–8–2
- Neutral: 3–1–0

Coaches and captains
- Head coach: Jerry Keefe
- Assistant coaches: Mike Levine; Jason Guerriero; Brian Mahoney-Wilson
- Captain: Justin Hryckowian
- Alternate captain(s): Matt DeMelis; Gunnarwolfe Fontaine

The 2023–24 Northeastern Huskies Men's ice hockey season was the 92nd season of play for the program and 40th in Hockey East. The Huskies represented Northeastern University in the 2023–24 NCAA Division I men's ice hockey season, played their home games at Matthews Arena and were coached by Jerry Keefe in his 3rd season.

== Season ==
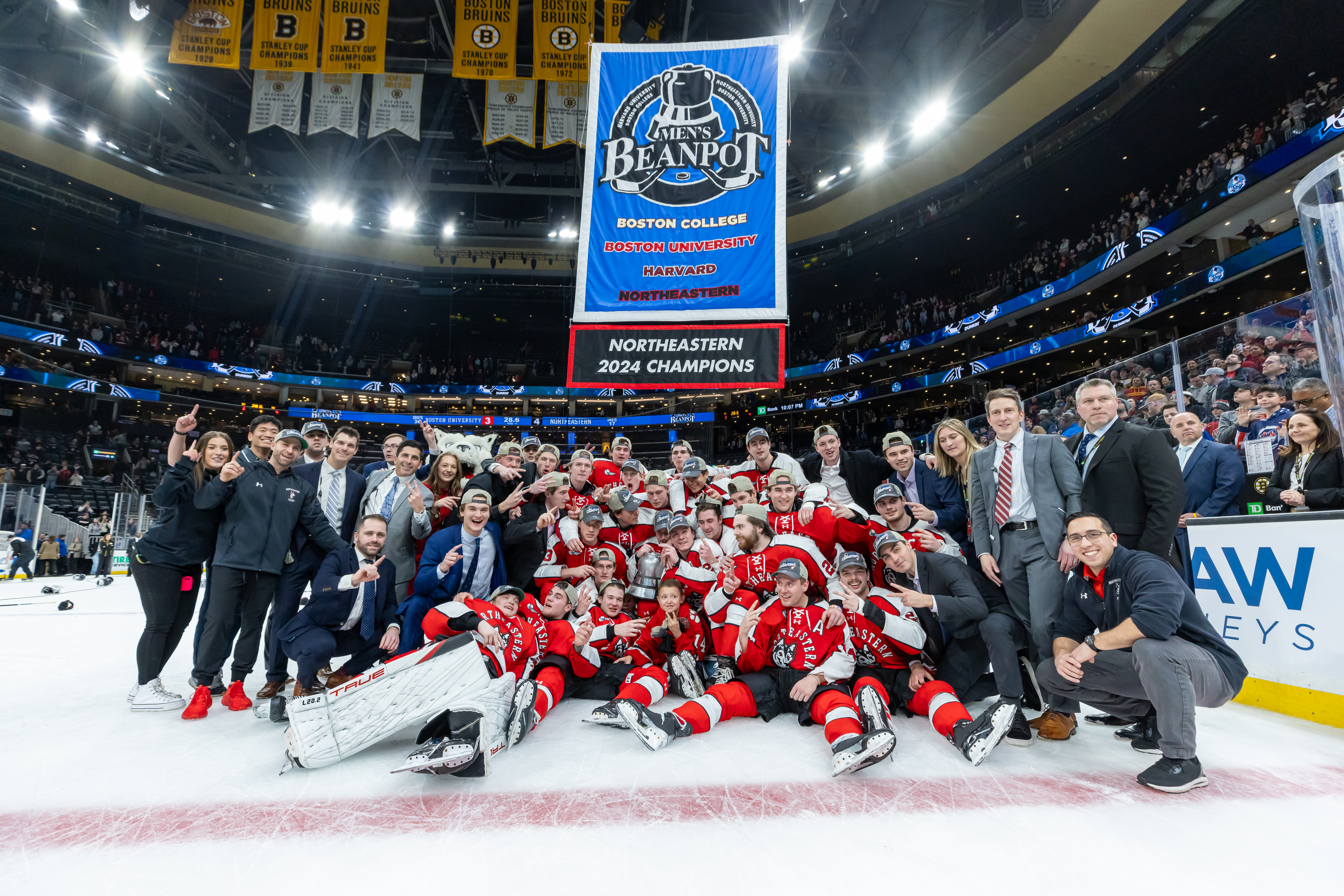
Team photo following Northeastern's victory in the 2024 men's Beanpot tournament

Northeastern had a rather sizable hurdle to overcome from the start of the season. Not only was the team having to contend with half of last year's roster departing but they were also having to replace the two-time national goaltender of the year, Devon Levi in goal. Freshman Cameron Whitehead stepped in between the pipes and looked good against weak opposition in the first few weeks, however, once the team began their conference schedule everything seemed to fall apart. Whitehead had a little trouble getting up to speed with the college game and though he had a couple of decent performances, he went winless over a 4-week stretch. Equally at fault was the almost complete lack of scoring that afflicted the Huskies. Team captain Justin Hryckowian missed over a month after getting hurt in the first game of the season while his brother Dylan along with Matt DeMelis and Jack Williams were in and out of the lineup with bumps and bruises. The rest of the offense didn't step up and cover for their absent teammates and Northeastern suffered as a result. By Thanksgiving, the team had lost seven games in a row, the worst start to the conference schedule in the history of the program.

The team took a slight break during the holiday weekend and travelled west to face Rensselaer. The first game was a pedestrian draw but the second looked to be a turning point of the season. Northeastern scored 9 goals in the first two periods and steamrolled the Engineers. Just as importantly, the Huskies got contributions from up and down the lineup with nine players recording at least 2 points in the match. The following week the team barely resembled the same group that had lost seven in a row when they took on #1 Boston College. After building a 3-goal lead in the first, the Huskies got into power play trouble and the match was tied entering the third. Cam Lund, who had been very quiet during the losing streak, completed a hat-trick in the final frame to lead the Huskies to a massive upset to give Northeastern its first conference win of the year.

After returning from the winter break, Whitehead went through a rough patch and Northeastern went winless in four. However, when it appeared that the season might be slipping back into the abyss, the offense stepped up and bailed out their netminder. In late January, the team scored at least 4 goals in each match over a four-game stretch and won every contest. The hot streak led the Huskies right into the Beanpot, where they were set to defend their championship. Northeastern was fortunate by being set against Harvard in the first game but still had a tough time beating a down Crimson squad. Despite widely outshooting the Ivy Leaguers, Northeastern needed a late comeback to force overtime. Their efforts were rewarded, however, when Gunnarwolfe Fontaine scored just 33 seconds into the extra frame. The championship match pitted the Huskies against Boston University but Northeastern didn't show any fear towards the #3 team. The Terriers got into the lead three separate times in the match but the Huskies matched every goal with one of their own. Despite a vast disparity in shots (17–36) Northeastern hung in the game and forced overtime. BU was in total control for seemingly the entire extra session but, with just seconds to play, a mistake in the BU end left Fontaine wide open in the left circle and the Huskies' only shot in overtime went in and Northeastern held on to its crown.

The win streak put Northeastern above .500 for the first time in months and gave the team an outside chance to earn an at-large bid to the NCAA tournament. Unfortunately, the Huskies plait each of the next three weekends and lost any chance of becoming a bubble team. When the conference tournament began, a Hockey East championship was Northeastern's only hope of making the national tournament. They played like it in their first game and shut down Merrimack 4–0 thanks to three-point nights from Justin and Dylan Hryckowian. In the semifinal, the Huskies met Boston University for the fourth time and the Terriers were looking for revenge. After a scoreless first period, BU took a 3-goal lead in the second to put Northeastern's season on the edge of a cliff. Justin Hryckowian scored two goals to spur a comeback from the Huskies but none of his teammates could follow suit. A late goal from BU ended the attempt and Northeastern would have to wait for another year.

== Departures ==
Player	Position	Nationality	Cause
Jérémie Bucheler	Defenseman	Canada	Graduate transfer to Vermont
Sam Colangelo	Forward	United States	Transferred to Western Michigan
James Davenport	Defenseman	United States	Left program (retired)
Cam Gaudette	Defenseman	United States	Transferred to Stonehill
Jack Hughes	Forward	United States	Transferred to Boston University
Riley Hughes	Forward	United States	Graduate transfer to Ohio State
Devon Levi	Goaltender	Canada	Signed professional contract (Buffalo Sabres)
Aidan McDonough	Forward	United States	Graduation (signed with Vancouver Canucks)
Chase McInnis	Forward	United States	Left program (retired)
Alex Mella	Forward	United States	Graduation (retired)
Jakov Novak	Forward	Canada	Graduation (signed with Allen Americans)
Tyler Spott	Defenseman	Canada	Graduate transfer to Sacred Heart
Jayden Struble	Defenseman	United States	Graduation (signed with Montreal Canadiens)

== Recruiting ==
Player	Position	Nationality	Age	Notes
Alex Campbell	Forward	United States	18	Châteauguay, QC; transfer from Clarkson; selected 65th overall in 2019
Patrick Dawson	Defenseman	United States	24	Medway, MA; graduate transfer from Sacred Heart
Brett Edwards	Forward	Canada	24	Grande Prairie, AB; graduate transfer from Denver
Michael Fisher	Defenseman	United States	19	Westborough, MA; selected 76th overall in 2022
Nolan Hayes	Defenseman	United States	21	Boston, MA
Connor Hopkins	Goaltender	United States	23	Malden, MA; graduate transfer from Yale
Dylan Hryckowian	Forward	Canada	19	L'Île-Bizard, QC
Andy Moore	Forward	United States	21	Cumberland, ME
Billy Norcross	Forward	United States	20	Lynn, MA
Eli Sebastian	Forward	United States	19	Burlington, ON
Matt Staudacher	Defenseman	United States	23	Grand Blanc, MI; graduate transfer from Minnesota
Pito Walton	Defenseman	United States	23	Peapack, NJ; graduate transfer from Princeton
Cameron Whitehead	Goaltender	United States	20	Orleans, ON; selected 128th overall in 2022

== Roster ==
As of September 26, 2023.

No.	Nat.	Player	Class	Pos	Height	Weight	DoB	Hometown	Previous team	NHL rights
1	(United States)	Connor Hopkins	Graduate	G	6' 1" (1.85 m)	200 lb (91 kg)	2000-03-09	Malden, Massachusetts	Yale (ECAC)	—
3	(United States)	Nolan Hayes	Freshman	D	6' 1" (1.85 m)	181 lb (82 kg)	2002-08-14	Boston, Massachusetts	West Kelowna Warriors (BCHL)	—
4	(United States)	Pito Walton	Graduate	D	6' 2" (1.88 m)	192 lb (87 kg)	2000-03-17	Peapack, New Jersey	Princeton (ECAC)	—
5	(United States)	Hunter McDonald	Sophomore	D	6' 4" (1.93 m)	207 lb (94 kg)	2002-05-11	Fairport, New York	Chicago Steel (USHL)	PHI, 165th overall 2022
7	(United States)	Michael Outzen	Senior	F	6' 0" (1.83 m)	185 lb (84 kg)	1999-07-29	Lone Tree, Colorado	New Jersey Titans (NAHL)	—
8	(United States)	Jackson Dorrington	Sophomore	D	6' 2" (1.88 m)	200 lb (91 kg)	2004-04-13	North Reading, Massachusetts	Des Moines Buccaneers (USHL)	VAN, 176th overall 2022
9	(Canada)	Matt Choupani	Junior	F	5' 11" (1.8 m)	185 lb (84 kg)	2002-01-02	Baie-D'Urfé, Quebec	Des Moines Buccaneers (USHL)	—
10	(United States)	Patrick Dawson	Graduate	D	6' 0" (1.83 m)	182 lb (83 kg)	1999-01-14	Medway, Massachusetts	Sacred Heart (AHA)	—
11	(United States)	Gunnarwolfe Fontaine (A)	Senior	F	5' 10" (1.78 m)	175 lb (79 kg)	2000-09-16	East Greenwich, Rhode Island	Chicago Steel (USHL)	NSH, 202nd overall 2020
12	(United States)	Cameron Lund	Sophomore	F	6' 2" (1.88 m)	190 lb (86 kg)	2004-06-07	Bridgewater, Massachusetts	Green Bay Gamblers (USHL)	SJS, 34th overall 2022
13	(Canada)	Dylan Hryckowian	Freshman	F	5' 10" (1.78 m)	180 lb (82 kg)	2004-05-19	L'Île-Bizard, Quebec	Cedar Rapids RoughRiders (USHL)	—
14	(United States)	Liam Walsh	Graduate	F	6' 1" (1.85 m)	200 lb (91 kg)	1999-07-14	Bridgeville, Pennsylvania	Merrimack (HEA)	—
15	(United States)	Jack Williams	Sophomore	F	5' 11" (1.8 m)	170 lb (77 kg)	2002-03-02	Biddeford, Maine	Muskegon Lumberjacks (USHL)	—
16	(United States)	Michael Fisher	Freshman	D	6' 3" (1.91 m)	195 lb (88 kg)	2004-05-02	Westborough, Massachusetts	Youngstown Phantoms (USHL)	SJS, 76th overall 2022
17	(United States)	Braden Doyle	Junior	D	6' 0" (1.83 m)	177 lb (80 kg)	2001-08-24	Lynnfield, Massachusetts	Penticton Vees (BCHL)	LAK, 157th overall 2019
18	(United States)	Andy Moore	Freshman	F	5' 11" (1.8 m)	195 lb (88 kg)	2002-01-21	Cumberland, Maine	Cedar Rapids RoughRiders (USHL)	—
19	(United States)	Billy Norcross	Freshman	F	6' 2" (1.88 m)	187 lb (85 kg)	2003-03-16	Lynn, Massachusetts	Penticton (BCHL)	—
20	(Canada)	Brett Edwards	Graduate	F	5' 11" (1.8 m)	192 lb (87 kg)	1998-09-10	Grande Prairie, Alberta	Denver (NCHC)	—
21	(United States)	Matt DeMelis (A)	Graduate	F	6' 1" (1.85 m)	190 lb (86 kg)	1999-06-02	Hingham, Massachusetts	Youngstown Phantoms (USHL)	—
22	(United States)	Vinny Borgesi	Sophomore	D	5' 8" (1.73 m)	170 lb (77 kg)	2004-03-02	Philadelphia, Pennsylvania	Tri-City Storm (USHL)	—
23	(Canada)	Eli Sebastian	Freshman	F	5' 11" (1.8 m)	190 lb (86 kg)	2004-05-19	Burlington, Ontario	Green Bay Gamblers (USHL)	—
24	(United States)	Kyle Furey	Sophomore	D	6' 0" (1.83 m)	175 lb (79 kg)	2002-02-05	Marshfield, Massachusetts	Lone Star Brahmas (NAHL)	—
25	(United States)	Matt Staudacher	Graduate	D	6' 1" (1.85 m)	200 lb (91 kg)	2000-02-07	Fenton, Michigan	Minnesota (Big Ten)	—
27	(Canada)	Alex Campbell	Senior	F	5' 11" (1.8 m)	174 lb (79 kg)	2001-02-27	Châteauguay, Quebec	Clarkson (ECAC)	NSH, 65th overall 2019
28	(United States)	Anthony Messuri	Sophomore	F	5' 8" (1.73 m)	170 lb (77 kg)	2001-07-24	Arlington, Massachusetts	Utica Jr. Comets (NCDC)	—
29	(Canada)	Justin Hryckowian (C)	Junior	F	5' 10" (1.78 m)	195 lb (88 kg)	2001-02-23	L'Île-Bizard, Quebec	Sioux City Musketeers (USHL)	—
33	(United States)	Harrison Chesney	Sophomore	G	6' 3" (1.91 m)	170 lb (77 kg)	2001-12-07	Malverne, New York	P.A.L. Jr. Islanders (NCDC)	—
37	(United States)	Grant Riley	Sophomore	G	6' 4" (1.93 m)	200 lb (91 kg)	2002-08-28	Rochester, New York	Chilliwack Chiefs (BCHL)	—
39	(Canada)	Cameron Whitehead	Freshman	G	6' 3" (1.91 m)	185 lb (84 kg)	2003-06-13	Orleans, Ontario	Lincoln Stars (USHL)	VGK, 128th overall 2022

== Standings ==
2023–24 Hockey East Standings
	Conference record										Overall record					
	GP	W	L	T	OTW	OTL	SW	PTS	GF	GA	GP	W	L	T	GF	GA
#2 Boston College †*	24	20	3	1	1	0	1	61	105	56	41	34	6	1	183	89
#3 Boston University	24	18	4	2	1	1	1	57	104	53	40	28	10	2	163	97
#10 Maine	24	14	9	1	0	1	0	44	76	67	37	23	12	2	119	94
#16 Providence	24	11	9	4	3	1	2	37	66	58	35	18	13	4	100	83
#13 Massachusetts	24	12	10	2	4	2	0	36	57	62	37	20	14	3	108	105
#20 New Hampshire	24	12	11	1	1	0	0	36	69	56	36	20	15	1	106	90
Northeastern	24	9	14	1	1	3	0	30	65	71	36	17	16	3	113	97
Connecticut	24	9	14	1	1	1	1	29	49	77	36	15	19	2	90	105
Vermont	24	7	14	3	1	0	3	26	52	81	35	13	19	3	87	106
Merrimack	24	6	17	1	0	1	1	21	62	85	35	13	21	1	98	114
Massachusetts Lowell	24	4	17	3	1	4	0	18	39	78	36	8	24	4	72	113
Championship: March 23, 2024 † indicates regular season champion * indicates conference tournament champion (Lamoriello Trophy); Rankings: USCHO Division I Men's Poll

== Schedule and results ==
Date	Time	Opponent^{#}	Rank^{#}	Site	TV	Decision	Result	Attendance	Record
Regular Season
October 7	7:00 pm	Stonehill*	#19	Matthews Arena • Boston, Massachusetts	ESPN+	Whitehead	W 7–0	2,621	1–0–0
October 8	4:00 pm	#2 Quinnipiac*	#19	Matthews Arena • Boston, Massachusetts (Exhibition)	ESPN+	Hopkins	T 2–2 ^{OT}		
October 14	7:00 pm	Bentley*	#19	Matthews Arena • Boston, Massachusetts	ESPN+	Whitehead	W 5–2	4,287	2–0–0
October 26	7:00 pm	at New Hampshire	#18	Whittemore Center • Durham, New Hampshire	ESPN+	Whitehead	L 1–4	3,613	2–1–0 (0–1–0)
October 28	7:00 pm	Merrimack	#18	Matthews Arena • Boston, Massachusetts	ESPN+	Whitehead	L 1–4	2,132	2–2–0 (0–2–0)
November 3	7:30 pm	at #18 Massachusetts		Mullins Center • Amherst, Massachusetts	ESPN+	Whitehead	L 1–2 ^{OT}	5,426	2–3–0 (0–3–0)
November 10	7:00 pm	at #5 Providence		Schneider Arena • Providence, Rhode Island	ESPN+	Whitehead	L 1–2 ^{OT}	2,914	2–4–0 (0–4–0)
November 11	7:00 pm	#5 Providence		Matthews Arena • Boston, Massachusetts	ESPN+	Whitehead	L 2–5	3,391	2–5–0 (0–5–0)
November 17	7:00 pm	#13 New Hampshire		Matthews Arena • Boston, Massachusetts	ESPN+	Whitehead	L 2–4	2,612	2–6–0 (0–6–0)
November 18	7:00 pm	at #13 New Hampshire		Whittemore Center • Durham, New Hampshire	ESPN+	Hopkins	L 0–4	6,010	2–7–0 (0–7–0)
November 25	7:00 pm	at Rensselaer*		Houston Field House • Troy, New York	ESPN+	Whitehead	T 3–3 ^{OT}	1,930	2–7–1
November 26	7:00 pm	at Rensselaer*		Houston Field House • Troy, New York	ESPN+	Whitehead	W 9–2	1,856	3–7–1
December 1	7:00 pm	#1 Boston College		Matthews Arena • Boston, Massachusetts	ESPN+	Whitehead	W 5–3	7,884	4–7–1 (1–7–0)
December 2	8:00 pm	at #1 Boston College		Conte Forum • Chestnut Hill, Massachusetts	ESPN+	Whitehead	L 1–3	4,392	4–8–1 (1–8–0)
December 9	7:00 pm	at Brown*		Meehan Auditorium • Providence, Rhode Island	ESPN+	Whitehead	W 4–1	1,077	5–8–1
Holiday Face–Off
December 28	5:00 pm	vs. Minnesota Duluth*		Fiserv Forum • Milwaukee, Wisconsin (Holiday Face–Off Semifinal)	BSW	Whitehead	W 4–3 ^{OT}	8,652	6–8–1
December 29	8:30 pm	vs. #6 Wisconsin*		Fiserv Forum • Milwaukee, Wisconsin (Holiday Face–Off Championship)	BSW	Whitehead	L 0–3	8,689	6–9–1
January 6	5:00 pm	#3 Quinnipiac*		Matthews Arena • Boston, Massachusetts	ESPN+	Whitehead	T 3–3 ^{OT}	4,182	6–9–2
January 9	7:00 pm	at #2 Boston University		Agganis Arena • Boston, Massachusetts	ESPN+	Whitehead	L 3–4 ^{OT}	4,248	6–10–2 (1–9–0)
January 12	7:00 pm	Vermont		Matthews Arena • Boston, Massachusetts	ESPN+	Hopkins	L 4–5	2,489	6–11–2 (1–10–0)
January 13	7:30 pm	Vermont		Matthews Arena • Boston, Massachusetts	ESPN+	Whitehead	W 3–1	3,121	7–11–2 (2–10–0)
January 20	7:00 pm	#12 Massachusetts		Matthews Arena • Boston, Massachusetts	ESPN+	Whitehead	L 1–2	4,182	7–12–2 (2–11–0)
January 26	7:00 pm	Merrimack		Matthews Arena • Boston, Massachusetts	ESPN+	Whitehead	W 5–3	2,421	8–12–2 (3–11–0)
January 27	7:00 pm	at Merrimack		J. Thom Lawler Rink • North Andover, Massachusetts	ESPN+	Whitehead	W 4–1	2,647	9–12–2 (4–11–0)
January 30	6:30 pm	#3 Boston University		Matthews Arena • Boston, Massachusetts	ESPNU, TSN	Whitehead	W 4–3 ^{OT}	4,009	10–12–2 (5–11–0)
February 2	7:00 pm	#6 Maine		Matthews Arena • Boston, Massachusetts	ESPN+, NESN	Whitehead	W 6–3	3,507	11–12–2 (6–11–0)
Beanpot
February 5	5:00 pm	vs. Harvard*		TD Garden • Boston, Massachusetts (Beanpot Semifinal)	NESN	Whitehead	W 3–2 ^{OT}	17,850	12–12–2
February 12	8:00 pm	vs. #3 Boston University*		TD Garden • Boston, Massachusetts (Beanpot Championship)	NESN	Whitehead	W 4–3 ^{OT}	—	13–12–2
February 16	7:15 pm	at Massachusetts Lowell		Tsongas Center • Lowell, Massachusetts	ESPN+	Whitehead	L 2–4	5,426	13–13–2 (6–12–0)
February 17	7:00 pm	Massachusetts Lowell		Matthews Arena • Boston, Massachusetts	ESPN+, NESN	Whitehead	W 4–0	3,002	14–13–2 (7–12–0)
February 23	7:00 pm	at #9 Maine		Alfond Arena • Orono, Maine	ESPN+	Whitehead	L 1–5	4,684	14–14–2 (7–13–0)
February 24	7:00 pm	at #9 Maine		Alfond Arena • Orono, Maine	ESPN+	Whitehead	W 4–0	4,777	15–14–2 (8–13–0)
March 1	7:00 pm	Connecticut		Matthews Arena • Boston, Massachusetts	ESPN+, NESN+	Whitehead	L 3–4	3,188	15–15–2 (8–15–0)
March 2	3:00 pm	at Connecticut		Toscano Family Ice Forum • Storrs, Connecticut	ESPN+	Whitehead	W 4–2	2,691	16–15–2 (9–15–0)
March 9	4:00 pm	at #11 Providence		Schneider Arena • Providence, Rhode Island	ESPN+	Whitehead	T 3–3 ^{SOL}	2,165	16–15–3 (9–15–1)
Hockey East Tournament
March 13	7:00 pm	Merrimack*		Matthews Arena • Boston, Massachusetts (Opening Round)	ESPN+	Whitehead	W 4–0	1,254	17–15–3
March 16	7:30 pm	at #2 Boston University*		Agganis Arena • Boston, Massachusetts (Quarterfinal)	ESPN+	Whitehead	L 2–4	5,455	17–16–3
*Non-conference game. ^{#}Rankings from USCHO.com Poll. All times are in Eastern Time. Source:

== Scoring statistics ==
Name	Position	Games	Goals	Assists	Points	PIM
Justin Hryckowian	C	32	13	30	43	8
Alex Campbell	C/LW	36	22	20	42	6
Jack Williams	RW	34	17	19	36	8
Dylan Hryckowian	RW	34	7	27	34	22
Cam Lund	C	35	11	19	30	22
Vinny Borgesi	D	34	5	23	28	10
Gunnarwolfe Fontaine	C/LW	36	8	19	27	6
Pito Walton	D	36	5	12	17	30
Jackson Dorrington	D	33	6	6	12	6
Matt Choupani	C	28	3	9	12	8
Matt Demelis	F	23	2	6	8	0
Liam Walsh	LW	36	4	3	7	28
Brett Edwards	F	31	5	2	7	18
Hunter McDonald	D	23	1	5	6	32
Matthew Staudacher	D	31	2	2	4	8
Billy Norcross	C	26	0	4	4	4
Nolan Hayes	D	22	0	3	3	0
Michael Fisher	D	29	1	1	2	14
Eli Sebastian	C	32	0	1	1	2
Braden Doyle	D	13	1	0	1	0
Andy Moore	F	31	0	1	1	12
Connor Hopkins	G	3	0	0	0	0
Anthony Messuri	F	3	0	0	0	0
Michael Outzen	F	16	0	0	0	2
Cameron Whitehead	G	35	0	0	0	2
Harrison Chesney	G	1	0	0	0	0
Patrick Dawson	D	16	0	0	0	2
Total			113	212	325	258

== Goaltending statistics ==
Name	Games	Minutes	Wins	Losses	Ties	Goals against	Saves	Shut outs	SV %	GAA
Harrison Chesney	1	5:41	0	0	0	0	1	0	1.000	0.00
Cameron Whitehead	35	2081:20	17	14	3	91	1005	4	.917	2.62
Connor Hopkins	3	86:29	0	2	0	5	26	0	.839	3.47
Empty Net	-	17:18	-	-	-	1	-	-	-	-
Total	36	2190:48	17	16	3	97	1032	4	.914	2.66

== Rankings ==
Poll	Week																										
Poll	Pre	1	2	3	4	5	6	7	8	9	10	11	12	13	14	15	16	17	18	19	20	21	22	23	24	25	26 (Final)
USCHO.com	19	19	16	18	NR	NR	NR	NR	NR	NR	NR	–	NR	NR	NR	NR	NR	NR	NR	NR	NR	NR	NR	NR	NR	–	NR
USA Hockey	18	19	16	17	NR	NR	NR	NR	NR	NR	NR	NR	–	NR	NR	NR	NR	NR	20	NR	NR	NR	20	NR	NR	NR	NR

Note: USCHO did not release a poll in weeks 11 or 25.
Note: USA Hockey did not release a poll in week 12.

== Awards and honors ==
Player	Award	Ref
Justin Hryckowian	Hockey East Best Defensive Forward	
Northeastern Huskies	Charlie Holt Team Sportsmanship Award	
Alex Campbell	Hockey East Third Team	
Justin Hryckowian	Hockey East Third Team	

== |2024 NHL entry draft ==
Round	Pick	Player	NHL team
7	195	Joseph Connor ^{†}	Tampa Bay Lightning

† incoming freshman
