= 2023–24 Hockey East men's season =

- Season: 2023–24
- Conference: Hockey East
- Division: Division I
- Sport: men's ice hockey
- Duration: October 7, 2023– April 13, 2024
- Number of teams: 11
- TV partner(s): ESPN+, NESN

NHL Entry Draft
- Top draft pick: Macklin Celebrini
- Picked by: San Jose Sharks

Regular Season
- Season champions: Boston College
- Season MVP: Macklin Celebrini
- Top scorer: Macklin Celebrini

Hockey East tournament
- Tournament champions: Boston College
- Runners-up: Boston University
- Tournament MVP: Will Smith
- Top scorer: Will Smith

NCAA tournament
- Bids: 4
- Record: 5–4
- Best Finish: Runner-Up
- Team(s): Boston College; Boston University; Maine; Massachusetts

The 2023–24 Hockey East men's season was the 40th season of play for Hockey East and took place during the 2023–24 NCAA Division I men's ice hockey season. The season began on October 7, 2023, and concluded with the national championship on April 13, 2024.

== Coaches ==
Vermont fired Todd Woodcroft after an investigation revealed that he had sent improper text to a female undergraduate. Because the school did not have the time to perform a full coaching search, Steve Wiedler was promoted to interim head coach for this season while the rest of the staff remained in place.

=== Records ===
Team	Head coach	Season at school	Record at school	Hockey East record
Boston College	Greg Brown	2	14–16–6	8–11–5
Boston University	Jay Pandolfo	2	29–11–0	18–6–0
Connecticut	Mike Cavanaugh	11	143–163–36	73–80–18
Maine	Ben Barr	3	22–38–9	14–28–6
Massachusetts	Greg Carvel	8	129–105–17	77–73–14
Massachusetts Lowell	Norm Bazin	13	254–145–39	149–97–32
Merrimack	Scott Borek	6	63–86–10	45–62–8
New Hampshire	Michael Souza	6	58–84–20	36–65–16
Northeastern	Jerry Keefe	3	42–26–6	29–15–4
Providence	Nate Leaman	13	241–150–58	143–100–40
Vermont	Steve Wiedler	1	0–0–0	0–0–0

== Standings ==
2023–24 Hockey East Standings
	Conference record										Overall record					
	GP	W	L	T	OTW	OTL	SW	PTS	GF	GA	GP	W	L	T	GF	GA
#2 Boston College †*	24	20	3	1	1	0	1	61	105	56	41	34	6	1	183	89
#3 Boston University	24	18	4	2	1	1	1	57	104	53	40	28	10	2	163	97
#10 Maine	24	14	9	1	0	1	0	44	76	67	37	23	12	2	119	94
#16 Providence	24	11	9	4	3	1	2	37	66	58	35	18	13	4	100	83
#13 Massachusetts	24	12	10	2	4	2	0	36	57	62	37	20	14	3	108	105
#20 New Hampshire	24	12	11	1	1	0	0	36	69	56	36	20	15	1	106	90
Northeastern	24	9	14	1	1	3	0	30	65	71	36	17	16	3	113	97
Connecticut	24	9	14	1	1	1	1	29	49	77	36	15	19	2	90	105
Vermont	24	7	14	3	1	0	3	26	52	81	35	13	19	3	87	106
Merrimack	24	6	17	1	0	1	1	21	62	85	35	13	21	1	98	114
Massachusetts Lowell	24	4	17	3	1	4	0	18	39	78	36	8	24	4	72	113
Championship: March 23, 2024 † indicates regular season champion * indicates conference tournament champion (Lamoriello Trophy); Rankings: USCHO Division I Men's Poll

== Non-Conference record ==
Hockey East had a tremendous season in non-conference play. The league as a whole did not have a losing record against any other conference but was particularly strong against ECAC Hockey (its primary opponent). Only one of the eleven league members (Massachusetts Lowell) had a losing record against non-conference foes while the rest had winning marks. Seven Hockey East members had at least a .700 winning percentage in non-league games, which gave the conference a huge boost in the PairWise rankings.

=== Regular season record ===
Team	Atlantic Hockey	Big Ten	CCHA	ECAC Hockey	Independent	NCHC	Total
Boston College	0–0–0	3–0–0	0–0–0	4–0–0	1–0–0	0–1–0	8–1–0
Boston University	1–0–0	1–1–0	0–0–0	2–1–0	0–0–0	1–1–0	5–3–0
Connecticut	1–2–0	0–0–0	0–0–0	4–2–1	0–0–0	0–0–0	5–4–1
Maine	2–0–0	0–0–0	0–0–0	6–1–1	0–0–0	0–0–0	8–1–1
Massachusetts	1–0–0	1–1–0	2–0–0	1–1–1	2–0–0	0–0–0	7–2–1
Massachusetts Lowell	0–4–1	0–0–0	0–0–0	3–0–0	1–1–0	0–1–0	4–6–1
Merrimack	3–0–0	0–0–0	0–0–0	3–1–0	1–2–0	0–0–0	7–3–0
New Hampshire	2–2–0	0–0–0	0–0–0	5–1–0	0–0–0	0–0–0	7–3–0
Northeastern	1–0–0	0–1–0	0–0–0	3–0–2	1–0–0	1–0–0	6–1–2
Providence	0–0–0	1–1–0	0–0–0	2–0–0	3–2–0	1–0–0	7–3–0
Vermont	0–1–0	0–0–0	2–0–0	2–3–0	2–0–0	0–0–0	6–4–0
Overall	11–9–1	6–4–0	4–0–0	35–10–5	11–5–0	3–3–0	70–31–6

== Statistics ==
=== Leading scorers ===
GP = Games played; G = Goals; A = Assists; Pts = Points

Player	Class	Team	GP	G	A	Pts
Macklin Celebrini	Freshman	Boston University	23	23	21	44
Will Smith	Freshman	Boston College	24	13	30	43
Cutter Gauthier	Sophomore	Boston College	24	25	16	40
Gabe Perreault	Freshman	Boston College	20	10	26	36
Ryan Leonard	Freshman	Boston College	24	19	16	35
Lane Hutson	Sophomore	Boston University	24	6	28	34
Bradly Nadeau	Freshman	Maine	24	12	19	31
Josh Nadeau	Freshman	Maine	24	11	19	30
Jeremy Wilmer	Sophomore	Boston University	23	5	21	26
Quinn Hutson	Sophomore	Boston University	24	15	10	25

=== Leading goaltenders ===
Minimum 1/3 of team's minutes played in conference games.
GP = Games played; Min = Minutes played; W = Wins; L = Losses; T = Ties; GA = Goals against; SO = Shutouts; SV% = Save percentage; GAA = Goals against average

Player	Class	Team	GP	Min	W	L	T	GA	SO	SV%	GAA
Jakob Hellsten	Junior	New Hampshire	21	1252:47	9	11	1	43	4	.908	2.06
Mathieu Caron	Junior	Boston University	24	1430:51	18	4	2	51	2	.924	2.14
Jacob Fowler	Freshman	Boston College	23	1366:07	19	3	1	50	2	.925	2.20
Albin Boija	Freshman	Maine	14	784:48	8	5	0	29	1	.909	2.22
Henry Welsch	Senior	Massachusetts Lowell	15	872:57	4	8	3	34	1	.913	2.34

== Conference tournament ==
Teams are reseeded after the Opening Round and Quarterfinals

Opening Round; March 13
6	New Hampshire	1
11	Massachusetts Lowell	0
7	Northeastern	4
10	Merrimack	0
8	Connecticut	4
9	Vermont	1

Quarterfinals; March 16
1	Boston College	5
8	Connecticut	4
2	Boston University	4
7	Northeastern	2
3	Maine	5
6	New Hampshire	0
4	Providence	1
5	Massachusetts	3

Semifinals; March 22
1	Boston College	8
5	Massachusetts	1
2	Boston University	4
3	Maine	1

Championship; March 23
1	Boston College	6
2	Boston University	2

Note: * denotes overtime period(s)

== Ranking ==
=== USCHO ===
Team	Pre	1	2	3	4	5	6	7	8	9	10	12	13	14	15	16	17	18	19	20	21	22	23	24	Final
Boston College	6	4	3	3	1	1	4	2	1	2	1	1	1	2	2	1	1	1	1	1	1	1	1	1	2
Boston University	1	1	6	9	9	9	8	5	4	3	2	2	2	1	1	3	3	3	2	2	2	2	2	2	3
Connecticut	NR	NR	NR	NR	NR	NR	NR	NR	NR	NR	NR	NR	NR	NR	NR	NR	NR	NR	NR	NR	NR	NR	NR	NR	NR
Maine	NR	NR	NR	NR	20	13	9	10	11	8	8	7	7	8	6	6	7	7	9	9	9	8	7	6	10
Massachusetts	NR	NR	NR	19	18	14	15	11	10	11	11	13	13	12	11	11	12	11	14	14	12	16	13	13	13
Massachusetts Lowell	NR	NR	NR	NR	NR	NR	NR	NR	NR	NR	NR	NR	NR	NR	NR	NR	NR	NR	NR	NR	NR	NR	NR	NR	NR
Merrimack	14	15	NR	NR	NR	NR	NR	NR	NR	NR	NR	NR	NR	NR	NR	NR	NR	NR	NR	NR	NR	NR	NR	NR	NR
New Hampshire	NR	NR	NR	NR	15	15	13	12	15	16	16	17	16	17	17	18	17	19	16	17	18	17	19	19	20
Northeastern	19	19	16	18	NR	NR	NR	NR	NR	NR	NR	NR	NR	NR	NR	NR	NR	NR	NR	NR	NR	NR	NR	NR	NR
Providence	18	13	10	7	7	5	5	9	9	9	10	9	9	9	10	10	10	10	12	10	11	13	16	16	16
Vermont	NR	NR	NR	NR	NR	NR	NR	NR	NR	NR	NR	NR	NR	NR	NR	NR	NR	NR	NR	NR	NR	NR	NR	NR	NR

=== USA Hockey ===
Team	Pre	1	2	3	4	5	6	7	8	9	10	11	13	14	15	16	17	18	19	20	21	22	23	24	25	Final
Boston College	6	5	3	3	1	1	3	2	1	3	1	1	1	2	2	1	1	1	1	1	1	1	1	1	1	2
Boston University	1	2	6	9	8	8	8	5	5	2	2	2	2	1	1	3	3	3	2	2	2	2	2	2	2	3
Connecticut	NR	NR	NR	NR	NR	NR	NR	NR	NR	NR	NR	NR	NR	NR	NR	NR	NR	NR	NR	NR	NR	NR	NR	NR	NR	NR
Maine	NR	NR	NR	NR	20	13	9	12	11	8	8	8	7	8	6	5	7	8	9	9	9	8	7	6	10	11
Massachusetts	NR	NR	NR	19	18	14	15	11	10	11	10	10	13	12	10	11	10	10	14	12	11	16	12	14	13	12
Massachusetts Lowell	NR	NR	NR	NR	NR	NR	NR	NR	NR	NR	NR	NR	NR	NR	NR	NR	NR	NR	NR	NR	NR	NR	NR	NR	NR	NR
Merrimack	12	13	NR	20	20	NR	NR	NR	NR	NR	NR	NR	NR	NR	NR	NR	NR	NR	NR	NR	NR	NR	NR	NR	NR	NR
New Hampshire	NR	NR	NR	NR	16	15	13	10	14	16	16	16	16	17	16	17	17	19	17	17	18	17	18	19	19	19
Northeastern	18	19	16	17	NR	NR	NR	NR	NR	NR	NR	NR	NR	NR	NR	NR	NR	20	NR	NR	NR	20	NR	NR	NR	NR
Providence	20	15	12	8	9	6	5	9	9	10	11	11	9	9	11	10	13	11	11	10	10	14	16	16	16	16
Vermont	NR	NR	NR	NR	NR	NR	NR	NR	NR	NR	NR	NR	NR	NR	NR	NR	NR	NR	NR	NR	NR	NR	NR	NR	NR	NR

=== Pairwise ===
Team	1	2	3	4	5	6	7	8	9	10	12	13	14	15	16	17	18	19	20	21	22	23	Final
Boston College	13	8	10	7	1	5	3	1	5	4	4	4	2	2	1	1	1	1	1	1	1	1	1
Boston University	13	44	39	22	14	9	2	3	2	2	2	1	1	1	3	3	3	2	2	2	2	2	2
Connecticut	10	22	25	28	43	42	36	35	35	34	28	29	27	21	25	22	24	22	23	24	25	24	24
Maine	32	46	36	2	4	2	5	5	3	3	1	3	6	5	5	4	6	7	9	9	7	6	5
Massachusetts	1	20	5	10	10	11	10	7	10	9	11	13	14	11	10	11	10	15	13	11	15	12	13
Massachusetts Lowell	11	41	15	13	16	23	24	29	30	37	38	35	35	34	36	33	34	34	37	37	40	40	41
Merrimack	32	54	13	9	30	29	31	26	25	32	26	26	23	26	30	33	30	31	31	30	34	33	35
New Hampshire	32	28	20	5	9	8	6	11	12	11	13	10	10	16	16	16	16	17	17	18	18	18	18
Northeastern	32	35	18	36	34	31	40	34	27	24	25	26	23	28	24	19	20	20	19	20	19	19	19
Providence	16	18	1	3	5	6	11	8	8	10	9	9	9	11	10	10	11	11	10	10	14	17	15
Vermont	32	6	24	23	25	26	26	23	23	35	26	32	31	31	29	27	28	27	29	27	32	32	33

Note: teams ranked in the top-10 automatically qualify for the NCAA tournament. Teams ranked 11-16 can qualify based upon conference tournament results.

== Awards ==
=== NCAA ===
Award	Recipient
Hobey Baker Award	Macklin Celebrini, Boston University
Spencer Penrose Award	Greg Brown, Boston College
Tim Taylor Award	Macklin Celebrini, Boston University
AHCA All-American Teams
East First Team	Position
Jacob Fowler, Boston College	G
Lane Hutson, Boston University	D
Ryan Ufko, Massachusetts	D
Macklin Celebrini, Boston University	F
Cutter Gauthier, Boston College	F
Will Smith, Boston College	F
East Second Team	Position
Ryan Leonard, Boston College	F
Gabe Perreault, Boston College	F
NCAA All-Tournament team
Will Smith, Boston College	F

=== Hockey East ===
Award		Recipient
Player of the Year		Macklin Celebrini, Boston University
Best Defensive Forward		Justin Hryckowian, Northeastern
Best Defensive Defenseman		Cade Webber, Boston University
Rookie of the Year		Macklin Celebrini, Boston University
Goaltending Champion		Jacob Fowler, Boston College
Len Ceglarski Award		Ryan Ufko, Massachusetts
Len Ceglarski Award		Eamon Powell, Boston College
Three Stars Award		Macklin Celebrini, Boston University
Scoring Champion		Macklin Celebrini, Boston University
Charlie Holt Team Sportsmanship Award		Northeastern
Bob Kullen Award (Coach of the Year)		Greg Brown, Boston College
William Flynn Tournament Most Valuable Player		Will Smith, Boston College
All-Hockey East Teams
First Team	Position	Second Team
Jacob Fowler, Boston College	G	Michael Hrabal, Massachusetts
Lane Hutson, Boston University	D	Eamon Powell, Boston College
Ryan Ufko, Massachusetts	D	Tom Willander, Boston University
Macklin Celebrini, Boston University	F	Ryan Leonard, Boston College
Cutter Gauthier, Boston College	F	Bradly Nadeau, Maine
Will Smith, Boston College	F	Gabe Perreault, Boston College
Third Team	Position	Rookie Team
Mathieu Caron, Boston University	G	Jacob Fowler, Boston College
Alex Gagne, New Hampshire	D	
Scott Morrow, Massachusetts	D	
Alex Campbell, Northeastern	F	Macklin Celebrini, Boston University
Justin Hryckowian, Northeastern	F	Ryan Leonard, Boston College
Josh Nadeau, Maine	F	Bradly Nadeau, Maine
	F	Gabe Perreault, Boston College
	F	Will Smith, Boston College
Hockey East All-Tournament Team
Jacob Fowler, Boston College	G	
Eamon Powell, Boston College	D	
Lane Hutson, Boston University	D	
Will Smith, Boston College	F	
Gabe Perreault, Boston College	F	
Macklin Celebrini, Boston University	F	

== 2024 NHL entry draft ==
Round	Pick	Player	College	NHL team
1	1	Macklin Celebrini	Boston University	San Jose Sharks
1	19	Trevor Connelly ^{†}	Providence	Vegas Golden Knights
1	20	Cole Eiserman ^{†}	Boston University	New York Islanders
1	25	Dean Letourneau ^{†}	Boston College	Boston Bruins
2	43	Cole Hutson ^{†}	Boston University	Washington Capitals
2	49	Mikhail Yegorov ^{†}	Boston University	New Jersey Devils
2	55	Teddy Stiga ^{†}	Boston College	Nashville Predators
2	61	Kamil Bednarik ^{†}	Boston University	New York Islanders
2	65	Will Skahan ^{†}	Boston College	Utah Hockey Club
3	67	John Mustard ^{†}	Providence	Chicago Blackhawks
3	78	Logan Sawyer ^{†}	Providence	Montreal Canadiens
3	92	Jack Pridham ^{†}	Boston University	Chicago Blackhawks
4	116	Christian Kirsch ^{†}	Massachusetts	San Jose Sharks
7	195	Joseph Connor ^{†}	Northeastern	Tampa Bay Lightning

† incoming freshman
