= 2023–24 UConn Huskies men's ice hockey season =

- Conference: 8th Hockey East
- Home ice: Toscano Family Ice Forum; XL Center

Rankings
- USCHO: NR
- USA Hockey: NR

Record
- Overall: 15–19–2
- Conference: 9–14–1
- Home: 7–11–0
- Road: 8–8–2

Coaches and captains
- Head coach: Mike Cavanaugh
- Assistant coaches: Tyler Helton; Michael Pereira; Vince Stalletti
- Captain(s): Jake Flynn; Hudson Schandor

The 2023–24 UConn Huskies men's ice hockey season was the 64th season of play for the program, the 26th at the Division I level, and the 10th in Hockey East. The Huskies represented the University of Connecticut and were coached by Mike Cavanaugh in his 11th season.

== Season ==
Hopes were high for UConn entering the season but the Huskies had trouble getting off the ground. While the goaltending rotation of Ethan Haider and Arsenii Sergeev performed well in the first month, the offense did not. Matthew Wood, the team's top prospect, had just three goals through the first eight games while the rest of the team wasn't much better. Then, when they least could afford it, the Huskies had to contend with a crisis in goal. Once November rolled around, Sergeev appeared to play properly in goal and a pair of very poor performances landed him on the shelf for two months. Haider was able to shoulder the load in the interim thanks to a modest improvement in scoring.

Connecticut was unable to find any consistency in the first half and they were hoping to remedy that with a strong performance after the winter break. They were able to improve their position with a pair of split series against ranked teams, which included Sergeev's triumphant return against Maine. A second place finish in Connecticut Ice did not do them many favors, but the team had a great opportunity to make a charge for the postseason with six straight games against ranked opponents. However, Connecticut won just one of those games and had no hope of securing an at-large bid by the end of the season.

UConn was given a date with Vermont to start the conference tournament and Sergeev, who had played very well down the stretch, was given the starting job in goal. UConn was able to use a pair of power play markers to capture the match and reach the quarterfinals. The nation's top team, Boston College, was their next opponent, but the Huskies did not appear to be intimidated. Even when BC built a three-goal lead just eight minutes into the game, UConn did not quit. Hudson Schandor got his team back in the game, contributing on a pair of goals, before Matthew Wood scored two in the third period to tie the game 4–4. However, UConn was unable to keep the momentum and a fifth goal from the Eagles was one too many for Connecticut.

== Departures ==
Player	Position	Nationality	Cause
Ty Amonte	Forward	United States	Graduation (retired)
Adam Dawe	Forward	Canada	Graduation (signed with Newfoundland Growlers)
Ryan Keane	Goaltender	United States	Graduation (retired)
Roman Kinal	Defenseman	United States	Graduation (signed with San Jose Barracuda)
Aidan Metcalfe	Defenseman	United States	Left program (retired)
Justin Pearson	Forward	United States	Graduation (signed with Cleveland Monsters)
Logan Terness	Goaltender	Canada	Transferred to Ohio State
Ryan Tverberg	Forward	United States	Signed professional contract (Toronto Maple Leafs)

== Recruiting ==
Player	Position	Nationality	Age	Notes
Oliver Flynn	Forward	United States	20	Wolcott, CT
Ethan Haider	Goaltender	United States	22	St. Louis Park, MN; transfer from Clarkson; selected 148th overall in 2019
Ryan Mahshie	Forward	Canada	24	Stoney Creek, ON; graduate transfer from Rensselaer
Joey Muldowney	Forward	United States	19	Lake View, NY; selected 176th overall in 2022
Jake Richard	Forward	United States	19	Jacksonville, FL; selected 170th overall in 2022
Owen Simpson	Defenseman	Canada	20	Toronto, ON
Bauer Swift	Defenseman	United States	21	West Hartford, CT

== Roster ==
As of September 21, 2023.

No.	Nat.	Player	Class	Pos	Height	Weight	DoB	Hometown	Previous team	NHL rights
1	(United States)	Ethan Haider	Senior	G	6' 3" (1.91 m)	209 lb (95 kg)	2001-09-04	Maple Grove, Minnesota	Clarkson (ECAC)	NSH, 148th overall 2019
2	(United States)	Jack Pascucci	Sophomore	D	6' 2" (1.88 m)	195 lb (88 kg)	2002-02-15	North Andover, Massachusetts	Des Moines Buccaneers (USHL)	—
5	(United States)	Bauer Swift	Freshman	D	6' 1" (1.85 m)	190 lb (86 kg)	2002-06-17	West Hartford, Connecticut	Lone Star Brahmas (NAHL)	—
6	(United States)	Andrew Lucas	Senior	D	5' 11" (1.8 m)	160 lb (73 kg)	1999-02-05	Alexandria, Virginia	Vermont (HEA)	—
7	(United States)	Huston Karpman	Sophomore	F	5' 11" (1.8 m)	200 lb (91 kg)	2001-02-07	Manhattan Beach, California	Minot Minotauros (NAHL)	—
8	(United States)	Joey Muldowney	Freshman	F	5' 11" (1.8 m)	154 lb (70 kg)	2004-06-05	Lake View, New York	Des Moines Buccaneers (USHL)	SJS, 172nd overall 2022
9	(Canada)	Ryan Tattle	Sophomore	F	5' 10" (1.78 m)	180 lb (82 kg)	2001-09-07	Port Moody, British Columbia	Coquitlam Express (BCHL)	—
10	(Canada)	Tristan Fraser	Sophomore	F	6' 0" (1.83 m)	190 lb (86 kg)	2001-11-13	West Vancouver, British Columbia	Nanaimo Clippers (BCHL)	—
11	(United States)	Jake Richard	Freshman	F	6' 1" (1.85 m)	194 lb (88 kg)	2004-08-15	Jacksonville, Florida	Tri-City Storm (USHL)	BUF, 170th overall 2022
12	(United States)	Oliver Flynn	Freshman	F	6' 1" (1.85 m)	205 lb (93 kg)	1998-05-17	Wolcott, Connecticut	Madison Capitols (USHL)	—
13	(Finland)	Samu Salminen	Sophomore	F	6' 3" (1.91 m)	190 lb (86 kg)	2003-04-09	Helsinki, Finland	Jokerit U20 (U20 SM-sarja)	NJD, 68th overall 2021
15	(United States)	Thomas Messineo	Sophomore	D	6' 0" (1.83 m)	190 lb (86 kg)	2002-05-02	Westwood, Massachusetts	Chilliwack Chiefs (BCHL)	—
16	(United States)	Jake Flynn (C)	Graduate	D	6' 0" (1.83 m)	180 lb (82 kg)	2001-05-26	Bridgewater, Massachusetts	Thayer Academy (USHS–MA)	—
17	(United States)	Jake Percival	Sophomore	F	5' 10" (1.78 m)	180 lb (82 kg)	2002-02-11	Avon, Connecticut	Cedar Rapids RoughRiders (USHL)	—
18	(United States)	John Spetz	Senior	D	5' 10" (1.78 m)	195 lb (88 kg)	1999-12-01	Oak Ridge, New Jersey	Chicago Steel (USHL)	—
19	(United States)	Jake Black	Sophomore	D	5' 11" (1.8 m)	180 lb (82 kg)	2002-03-05	Pomfret, Connecticut	Johnstown Tomahawks (NAHL)	—
20	(United States)	Chase Bradley	Junior	F	5' 11" (1.8 m)	180 lb (82 kg)	2002-01-09	St. Louis, Missouri	Sioux City Musketeers (USHL)	DET, 203rd overall 2020
21	(United States)	Nick Capone	Senior	F	6' 2" (1.88 m)	205 lb (93 kg)	2001-12-17	East Haven, Connecticut	Tri-City Storm (USHL)	TBL, 157th overall 2020
22	(Canada)	Hudson Schandor (C)	Senior	F	5' 8" (1.73 m)	165 lb (75 kg)	2000-09-29	North Vancouver, British Columbia	Surrey Eagles (BCHL)	—
23	(United States)	Tabor Heaslip	Sophomore	F	5' 9" (1.75 m)	175 lb (79 kg)	2001-12-17	Frisco, Texas	Sioux City Musketeers (USHL)	—
24	(United States)	Mark D'Agostino	Sophomore	F	6' 0" (1.83 m)	180 lb (82 kg)	2001-05-06	North Branford, Connecticut	Powell River Kings (BCHL)	—
25	(Canada)	Ryan Mahshie	Graduate	F	6' 3" (1.91 m)	215 lb (98 kg)	1999-04-05	Stoney Creek, Ontario	Rensselaer (ECAC)	—
27	(Canada)	Harrison Rees	Graduate	D	6' 2" (1.88 m)	175 lb (79 kg)	2000-03-19	Oakville, Ontario	North York Rangers (OJHL)	—
29	(United States)	Jake Veilleux	Junior	D	6' 0" (1.83 m)	185 lb (84 kg)	2000-01-19	South Windsor, Connecticut	Victoria Grizzlies (BCHL)	—
30	(Russia)	Arsenii Sergeev	Sophomore	G	6' 3" (1.91 m)	195 lb (88 kg)	2002-12-16	Yaroslavl, Russia	Tri-City Storm (USHL)	CGY, 205th overall 2021
31	(United States)	Matt Pasquale	Senior	G	6' 2" (1.88 m)	190 lb (86 kg)	2000-10-06	North Reading, Massachusetts	Northeast Generals (NAHL)	—
34	(Canada)	Owen Simpson	Freshman	D	6' 3" (1.91 m)	185 lb (84 kg)	2003-07-01	Toronto, Ontario	Penticton Vees (BCHL)	—
71	(Canada)	Matthew Wood	Sophomore	F	6' 3" (1.91 m)	190 lb (86 kg)	2005-02-06	Nanaimo, British Columbia	Victoria Grizzlies (BCHL)	NSH, 15th overall 2023

== Standings ==
2023–24 Hockey East Standings
	Conference record										Overall record					
	GP	W	L	T	OTW	OTL	SW	PTS	GF	GA	GP	W	L	T	GF	GA
#2 Boston College †*	24	20	3	1	1	0	1	61	105	56	41	34	6	1	183	89
#3 Boston University	24	18	4	2	1	1	1	57	104	53	40	28	10	2	163	97
#10 Maine	24	14	9	1	0	1	0	44	76	67	37	23	12	2	119	94
#16 Providence	24	11	9	4	3	1	2	37	66	58	35	18	13	4	100	83
#13 Massachusetts	24	12	10	2	4	2	0	36	57	62	37	20	14	3	108	105
#20 New Hampshire	24	12	11	1	1	0	0	36	69	56	36	20	15	1	106	90
Northeastern	24	9	14	1	1	3	0	30	65	71	36	17	16	3	113	97
Connecticut	24	9	14	1	1	1	1	29	49	77	36	15	19	2	90	105
Vermont	24	7	14	3	1	0	3	26	52	81	35	13	19	3	87	106
Merrimack	24	6	17	1	0	1	1	21	62	85	35	13	21	1	98	114
Massachusetts Lowell	24	4	17	3	1	4	0	18	39	78	36	8	24	4	72	113
Championship: March 23, 2024 † indicates regular season champion * indicates conference tournament champion (Lamoriello Trophy); Rankings: USCHO Division I Men's Poll

== Schedule and results ==
Date	Time	Opponent^{#}	Rank^{#}	Site	TV	Decision	Result	Attendance	Record
Regular season
October 7	7:00 pm	at Colgate*		Class of 1965 Arena • Hamilton, New York	ESPN+	Sergeev	W 4–2	923	1–0–0
October 8	3:00 pm	at Colgate*		Class of 1965 Arena • Hamilton, New York	ESPN+	Haider	T 3–3 ^{OT}	792	1–0–1
October 13	7:00 pm	at Holy Cross*	#20	Hart Center • Worcester, Massachusetts	FloHockey, NESN+	Sergeev	L 1–2	1,100	1–1–1
October 14	7:00 pm	Holy Cross*	#20	Toscano Family Ice Forum • Storrs, Connecticut	ESPN+	Haider	L 0–2	2,296	1–2–1
October 20	7:00 pm	at Union*		Achilles Rink • Schenectady, New York	ESPN+	Sergeev	L 1–4	2,100	1–3–1
October 21	4:00 pm	at Union*		Achilles Rink • Schenectady, New York	ESPN+	Haider	W 5–0	1,821	2–3–1
October 27	7:15 pm	at Massachusetts Lowell		Tsongas Center • Lowell, Massachusetts	ESPN+	Sergeev	W 2–1 ^{OT}	6,560	3–3–1 (1–0–0)
October 28	4:00 pm	Massachusetts Lowell		XL Center • Hartford, Connecticut	ESPN+	Haider	L 0–1	2,902	3–4–1 (1–1–0)
November 3	7:00 pm	at Vermont		Gutterson Fieldhouse • Burlington, Vermont	ESPN+	Sergeev	L 1–4	2,796	3–5–1 (1–2–0)
November 4	6:00 pm	at Vermont		Gutterson Fieldhouse • Burlington, Vermont	ESPN+	Haider	W 5–2	3,235	4–5–1 (2–2–0)
November 10	7:00 pm	Merrimack		Toscano Family Ice Forum • Storrs, Connecticut	ESPN+	Sergeev	L 3–6	2,630	4–6–1 (2–3–0)
November 11	7:00 pm	at Merrimack		J. Thom Lawler Rink • North Andover, Massachusetts	ESPN+	Haider	W 4–3	2,432	5–6–1 (3–3–0)
November 17	7:00 pm	at #4 Boston College		Conte Forum • Chestnut Hill, Massachusetts	ESPN+	Haider	L 4–5 ^{OT}	6,127	5–7–1 (3–4–0)
November 18	7:00 pm	#4 Boston College		Toscano Family Ice Forum • Storrs, Connecticut	ESPN+	Haider	L 0–3	2,630	5–8–1 (3–5–0)
November 25	3:00 pm	Dartmouth*		XL Center • Hartford, Connecticut	ESPN+	Haider	W 6–1	3,582	6–8–1
December 1	7:00 pm	Massachusetts Lowell		Toscano Family Ice Forum • Storrs, Connecticut	ESPN+, NESN	Haider	W 2–0	2,630	7–8–1 (4–5–0)
December 3	4:00 pm	at #11 Maine		Alfond Arena • Orono, Maine	ESPN+	Haider	L 3–7	4,661	7–9–1 (4–6–0)
December 31	3:00 pm	Harvard*		Toscano Family Ice Forum • Storrs, Connecticut	ESPNU	Haider	W 4–2	2,630	8–9–1
January 5	7:00 pm	at #13 Massachusetts		Mullins Center • Amherst, Massachusetts	ESPN+	Haider	T 3–3 ^{SOW}	2,630	8–9–2 (4–6–1)
January 12	7:00 pm	#7 Maine		XL Center • Hartford, Connecticut	ESPN+	Haider	L 3–5	4,377	8–10–2 (4–7–1)
January 13	3:00 pm	#7 Maine		XL Center • Hartford, Connecticut	ESPN+	Sergeev	W 2–0	9,428	9–10–2 (5–7–1)
January 19	7:00 pm	#17 New Hampshire		Toscano Family Ice Forum • Storrs, Connecticut	ESPN+, NESN	Haider	L 0–5	2,691	9–11–2 (5–8–1)
January 21	4:00 pm	at #17 New Hampshire		Whittemore Center • Durham, New Hampshire	ESPN+, NESN	Sergeev	W 2–1	5,482	10–11–2 (6–8–1)
Connecticut Ice
January 26	3:30 pm	Sacred Heart*		XL Center • Hartford, Connecticut (Connecticut Ice Semifinal)	SNY	Sergeev	W 6–2	4,633	11–11–2
January 27	7:30 pm	#7 Quinnipiac*		XL Center • Hartford, Connecticut (Connecticut Ice Championship)	SNY	Haider	L 3–4	6,429	11–12–2
Regular season
February 2	7:00 pm	#10 Providence		Toscano Family Ice Forum • Storrs, Connecticut	ESPN+	Sergeev	L 0–5	2,691	11–13–2 (6–9–1)
February 3	7:00 pm	at #10 Providence		Schneider Arena • Providence, Rhode Island	ESPN+	Haider	W 2–1	2,870	12–13–2 (7–9–1)
February 9	7:00 pm	#12 Massachusetts		Toscano Family Ice Forum • Storrs, Connecticut	ESPN+	Sergeev	L 0–2	2,691	12–14–2 (7–10–1)
February 10	7:00 pm	at #12 Massachusetts		Mullins Center • Amherst, Massachusetts	ESPN+, NESN	Haider	L 1–3	6,342	12–15–2 (7–11–1)
February 23	7:00 pm	#2 Boston University		Toscano Family Ice Forum • Storrs, Connecticut	ESPN+	Sergeev	L 1–6	2,691	12–16–2 (7–12–1)
February 24	7:00 pm	at #2 Boston University		Agganis Arena • Boston, Massachusetts	ESPN+	Haider	L 0–6	5,857	12–17–2 (7–13–1)
March 1	7:30 pm	at Northeastern		Matthews Arena • Boston, Massachusetts	ESPN+, NESN+	Sergeev	W 4–3	3,188	13–17–2 (8–13–1)
March 2	3:00 pm	Northeastern		Toscano Family Ice Forum • Storrs, Connecticut	ESPN+	Haider	L 2–4	2,691	13–18–2 (8–14–1)
March 7	7:00 pm	Vermont		Toscano Family Ice Forum • Storrs, Connecticut	ESPN+	Sergeev	W 5–1	2,691	14–18–2 (9–14–1)
Hockey East Tournament
March 13	7:00 pm	Vermont*		Toscano Family Ice Forum • Storrs, Connecticut (Opening Round)	ESPN+	Sergeev	W 4–1	2,021	15–18–2
March 16	7:00 pm	at #1 Boston College*		Conte Forum • Chestnut Hill, Massachusetts (Quarterfinal)	ESPN+, NESN+	Sergeev	L 4–5	6,705	15–19–2
*Non-conference game. ^{#}Rankings from USCHO.com Poll. All times are in Eastern Time. Source:

== Scoring statistics ==
Name	Position	Games	Goals	Assists	Points	PIM
Matthew Wood	C//LW	35	16	12	28	43
Chase Bradley	C/LW	31	11	11	22	53
Hudson Schandor	C	34	5	16	21	31
Jake Richard	RW	36	7	11	18	6
Samu Salminen	C/LW	35	7	10	17	35
Andrew Lucas	D	36	5	11	16	16
Jake Percival	F	36	7	7	14	18
Joey Muldowney	RW	35	5	9	14	12
Ryan Tattle	F	34	4	8	12	22
Tristan Fraser	F	35	7	4	11	33
Tom Messineo	D	36	0	11	11	2
Nick Capone	RW	32	4	4	8	46
Tabor Heaslip	F	36	1	7	8	16
Harrison Rees	D	36	3	4	7	10
John Spetz	D	36	2	4	6	18
Jake Flynn	D	33	1	5	6	10
Ryan Mahshie	F	21	2	3	5	4
Jake Black	F	24	2	2	4	2
Oliver Flynn	C	23	1	1	2	6
Owen Simpson	D	14	0	1	1	4
Arsenii Sergeev	G	16	0	0	0	0
Huston Karpman	F	1	0	0	0	0
Jake Veilleux	D/F	11	0	0	0	0
Ethan Haider	G	21	0	0	0	0
Matt Pasquale	G	1	0	0	0	0
Jack Pascucci	D	24	0	0	0	6
Total			90	141	231	401

== Goaltending statistics ==
Name	Games	Minutes	Wins	Losses	Ties	Goals against	Saves	Shut outs	SV %	GAA
Arsenii Sergeev	16	934:02	8	8	0	42	443	1	.913	2.70
Ethan Haider	22	1216:33	7	11	2	59	564	2	.905	2.91
Matt Pasquale	2	7:28	0	0	0	1	4	0	.800	8.04
Empty Net	-	20:05	-	-	-	3	-	-	-	-
Total	36	2178:08	15	19	2	105	1011	3	.906	2.89

== Rankings ==
Poll	Week																										
Poll	Pre	1	2	3	4	5	6	7	8	9	10	11	12	13	14	15	16	17	18	19	20	21	22	23	24	25	26 (Final)
USCHO.com	NR	20	NR	NR	NR	NR	NR	NR	NR	NR	NR	–	NR	NR	NR	NR	NR	NR	NR	NR	NR	NR	NR	NR	NR	–	NR
USA Hockey	NR	20	NR	NR	NR	NR	NR	NR	NR	NR	NR	NR	–	NR	NR	NR	NR	NR	NR	NR	NR	NR	NR	NR	NR	NR	NR

Note: USCHO did not release a poll in weeks 11 and 25.
Note: USA Hockey did not release a poll in week 12.
