= 2024 Hockey East men's ice hockey tournament =

- Dates: March 13–23, 2024
- Teams: 11
- Finals site: TD Garden; Boston, Massachusetts
- Champions: Boston College (12th title)
- Winning coach: Greg Brown (1st title)
- Hockey East men's Ice Hockey Tournaments

The 2024 Hockey East men's ice hockey tournament was the 39th tournament in the history of the conference. It was played between March 13 and March 23, 2024. The tournament champion, Boston College, received the conference's automatic bid into the 2024 NCAA Division I men's ice hockey tournament.

== Format ==
The tournament includes all eleven teams in the conference, with teams ranked according to their finish in the conference standings. Seeds 1–5 earn a bye into the quarterfinal round, while seeds 6–11 play to determine the remaining quarterfinalists. Winners in the opening round are reseeded and advanced to play top three seeds in reverse order. Winners of the quarterfinal matches are again reseeded for the semifinal, and the winners of those two games face off in the championship.

All series are single-elimination with opening round and quarterfinal matches occurring at home team sites. The two semifinal games and championship match are held at the TD Garden. The tournament champion receives an automatic bid into the NCAA Division I men's ice hockey tournament.

== Standings ==
2023–24 Hockey East Standings
	Conference record										Overall record					
	GP	W	L	T	OTW	OTL	SW	PTS	GF	GA	GP	W	L	T	GF	GA
#2 Boston College †*	24	20	3	1	1	0	1	61	105	56	41	34	6	1	183	89
#3 Boston University	24	18	4	2	1	1	1	57	104	53	40	28	10	2	163	97
#10 Maine	24	14	9	1	0	1	0	44	76	67	37	23	12	2	119	94
#16 Providence	24	11	9	4	3	1	2	37	66	58	35	18	13	4	100	83
#13 Massachusetts	24	12	10	2	4	2	0	36	57	62	37	20	14	3	108	105
#20 New Hampshire	24	12	11	1	1	0	0	36	69	56	36	20	15	1	106	90
Northeastern	24	9	14	1	1	3	0	30	65	71	36	17	16	3	113	97
Connecticut	24	9	14	1	1	1	1	29	49	77	36	15	19	2	90	105
Vermont	24	7	14	3	1	0	3	26	52	81	35	13	19	3	87	106
Merrimack	24	6	17	1	0	1	1	21	62	85	35	13	21	1	98	114
Massachusetts Lowell	24	4	17	3	1	4	0	18	39	78	36	8	24	4	72	113
Championship: March 23, 2024 † indicates regular season champion * indicates conference tournament champion (Lamoriello Trophy); Rankings: USCHO Division I Men's Poll

== Bracket ==
Teams are reseeded after the Opening Round and Quarterfinals

Opening Round; March 13
6	New Hampshire	1
11	Massachusetts Lowell	0
7	Northeastern	4
10	Merrimack	0
8	Connecticut	4
9	Vermont	1

Quarterfinals; March 16
1	Boston College	5
8	Connecticut	4
2	Boston University	4
7	Northeastern	2
3	Maine	5
6	New Hampshire	0
4	Providence	1
5	Massachusetts	3

Semifinals; March 22
1	Boston College	8
5	Massachusetts	1
2	Boston University	4
3	Maine	1

Championship; March 23
1	Boston College	6
2	Boston University	2

Note: * denotes overtime period(s)

== Results ==
Note: All game times are local.

=== Opening Round: March 13, 2024 ===
==== (6) New Hampshire vs. (11) Massachusetts Lowell ====
Durham, NH - Whittemore Center - 7:00 PM - Attendance: 4,032

Scoring summary
Period	Team	Goal	Assist(s)	Time	Score
1st	UNH	Harrison Blaisdell - GWG	Reid, Cronin	10:46	1–0 UNH
2nd	None				
3rd	None				

Goaltenders
Team	Name	Saves	Goals against	Time on ice
UNH	Jakob Hellsten	20	0	
UML	Henry Welsch	18	1	

==== (7) Northeastern vs. (10) Merrimack ====
Boston, MA - Matthews Arena - 7:00 PM - Attendance: 1,254

Scoring summary
Period	Team	Goal	Assist(s)	Time	Score
1st	NU	Alex Campbell - GWG	J. Hryckowian	3:15	1–0 NU
2nd	NU	Vinny Borgesi	Campbell, D. Hryckowian	31:15	2–0 NU
2nd	NU	Pito Walton	J. Hryckowian, D. Hryckowian	36:28	3-0 NU
3rd	NU	Dylan Hryckowian - ENG	J. Hryckowian, Campbell	56:28	4-0 NU

Goaltenders
Team	Name	Saves	Goals against	Time on ice
NU	Cameron Whitehead	22	0	
MC	Hugo Ollas	22	3	

==== (8) Connecticut vs. (9) Vermont ====
Storrs, CT - Toscano Family Ice Forum - 7:00 PM - Attendance: 2,021

Scoring summary
Period	Team	Goal	Assist(s)	Time	Score
1st	CONN	Matthew Wood - PPG	Richard, Tattle	15:28	1–0 CONN
2nd	UVM	Thomas Sinclair	Bucheler	22:19	1–1
3rd	CONN	Andrew Lucas - GWG	Richard, Wood	53:53	2-1 CONN
3rd	CONN	Harrison Rees	Schandor, Lucas	55:43	3-1 CONN
3rd	CONN	Joey Muldowney - ENG	Messineo	59:11	4-1 CONN

Goaltenders
Team	Name	Saves	Goals against	Time on ice
CONN	Arsenii Sergeev	26	1	
UVM	Gabe Carriere	23	3	

=== Quarterfinals: March 16, 2024 ===
==== (1) Boston College vs. (8) Connecticut ====
Chestnut Hill, MA - Conte Forum - 7:30 PM - Attendance: 6,705

Scoring summary
Period	Team	Goal	Assist(s)	Time	Score
1st	BC	Jacob Bengtsson	Posma, Armstrong	2:19	1–0 BC
1st	BC	Jack Malone	Gasseau, Gustafsson	3:26	2–0 BC
1st	BC	Drew Fortescue	Jellvik, Malone	8:00	3–0 BC
1st	CONN	John Spetz	Schandor	8:41	3–1 BC
2nd	BC	Ryan Leonard - PPG	Powell, Smith	39:48	4–1 BC
3rd	CONN	Jake Richard	Schandor, Spetz	40:11	4–2 BC
3rd	CONN	Matthew Wood	Salminen, Rees	41:05	4–3 BC
3rd	CONN	Matthew Wood - PPG	Unassisted	45:35	4–4
3rd	BC	Jack Malone - GWG	Gasseau, Bengtsson	49:25	5–4 BC

Goaltenders
Team	Name	Saves	Goals against	Time on ice
BC	Jacob Fowler	30	4	
CONN	Arsenii Sergeev	28	5	

==== (2) Boston University vs. (7) Northeastern ====
Boston, MA - Agganis Arena - 4:15 PM - Attendance: 5,455

Scoring summary
Period	Team	Goal	Assist(s)	Time	Score
1st	None				
2nd	BU	Quinn Hutson	Greene, Hughes	29:51	1–0 BU
2nd	BU	Luke Tuch - PPG	Wilmer, Willander	33:40	2–0 BU
2nd	BU	Case McCarthy - GWG	Tuch, Peterson	37:53	3–0 BU
2nd	NU	Justin Hryckowian	D. Hryckowian, Campbell	38:51	3–1 BU
3rd	NU	Justin Hryckowian	Campbell, D. Hryckowian	45:09	3–2 BU
3rd	BU	Macklin Celebrini	Harvey, L. Hutson	45:35	4–2 BU

Goaltenders
Team	Name	Saves	Goals against	Time on ice
BU	Mathieu Caron	21	2	
NU	Cameron Whitehead	28	4	

==== (3) Maine vs. (6) New Hampshire ====
Orono, ME - Alfond Arena - 7:00 PM - Attendance: 5,043

Scoring summary
Period	Team	Goal	Assist(s)	Time	Score
1st	None				
2nd	MAINE	Josh Nadeau - GWG	B. Nadeau, Renwick	20:52	1–0 MAINE
2nd	MAINE	Ben Poisson - PPG	J. Nadeau, Breen	28:23	2–0 MAINE
2nd	MAINE	Bradly Nadeau	J. Nadeau, Renwick	35:07	3–0 MAINE
3rd	MAINE	Bradly Nadeau - PPG	Breazeale, Antonacci	48:48	4-0 MAINE
3rd	MAINE	Josh Nadeau	B. Nadeau, Renwick	57:17	5–0 MAINE

Goaltenders
Team	Name	Saves	Goals against	Time on ice
MAINE	Albin Boija	18	0	
UNH	Jakob Hellsten	20	5	

==== (4) Providence vs. (5) Massachusetts ====
Providence, RI - Schneider Arena - 4:00 PM - Attendance: 2,644

Scoring summary
Period	Team	Goal	Assist(s)	Time	Score
1st	MASS	Ryan Lautenbach	Mercuri, Makar	1:07	1–0 MASS
1st	MASS	Ryan Ufko - GWG	Connors	4:16	2-0 MASS
2nd	None				
3rd	MASS	Kenny Connors	Lautenbech, Mercuri	54:22	3–0 MASS
3rd	PC	Hudson Malinoski - PPG	Richard, Adams	54:50	3–1 MASS

Goaltenders
Team	Name	Saves	Goals against	Time on ice
PC	Philip Svedeback	22	3	
MASS	Michael Hrabal	27	1	

=== Semifinals: March 22, 2024 ===
==== (1) Boston College vs (5) Massachusetts ====
Boston, MA - TD Garden - 4:00 PM - Attendance: -

Scoring summary
Period	Team	Goal	Assist(s)	Time	Score
1st	MASS	Lucas Mercuri	Lautenbach, Morrow	6:33	1–0 MASS
1st	BC	Ryan Leonard- PPG	Smith, Gauthier	8:02	1–1
2nd	BC	Gabe Perreault - GWG	Leonard, Leddy	24:41	2–1 BC
2nd	BC	Andre Gasseau	Gauthier, Jellvik	26:43	3–1 BC
2nd	BC	Will Smith	Leonard, Perreault	36:03	4–1 BC
2nd	BC	Cutter Gauthier	Jellvik, Gasseau	36:49	5–1 BC
3rd	BC	Aram Minnetian	Malone, Hreschuk	43:00	6–1 BC
3rd	BC	Gabe Perreault	Smith, Gustafsson	45:04	7–1 BC
3rd	BC	Cutter Gauthier - PPG	Smith, Perreault	57:29	8–1 BC

Goaltenders
Team	Name	Saves	Goals against	Time on ice
BC	Jacob Fowler	28	1	
MASS	Michael Hrabal	28	8	

==== (2) Boston University vs (3) Maine ====
Boston, MA - TD Garden - 7:30 PM - Attendance: 17,850

Scoring summary
Period	Team	Goal	Assist(s)	Time	Score
1st	BU	Ryan Greene	Q. Hutson	8:59	1–0 BU
2nd	BU	Lane Hutson - PPG - GWG	M. Celebrini, Q. Hutson	29:21	2–0 BU
3rd	MAINE	Lynden Breen - PPG	Chabrier, B. Nadeau	46:48	2–1 BU
3rd	BU	Ryan Greene - PPG	M. Celebrini, LaChance	50:43	3–1 BU
3rd	BU	Sam Stevens - ENG	Tuch, M. Celebrini	59:33	4–1 BU

Goaltenders
Team	Name	Saves	Goals against	Time on ice
MAINE	Albin Boija	14	3	
BU	Mathieu Caron	32	1	

=== Championship: March 23, 2024 ===
==== (1) Boston College vs (2) Boston University - 7:00 PM ====
Boston, MA - TD Garden - 7:00 PM - Attendance: 17,850

Scoring summary
Period	Team	Goal	Assist(s)	Time	Score
1st	BC	Will Smith - PPG	Powell, Gauthier	5:46	1–0 BC
1st	BC	Will Smith - PPG	Perrault, Powell	8:37	2-0 BC
2nd	BU	Gavin McCarthy	Greene	24:24	2–1 BC
2nd	BC	Cutter Gauthier - PPG GWG	Perrault, Smith	38:46	3–1 BC
3rd	BC	Will Smith	Leonard	46:46	4–1 BC
3rd	BC	Gabe Perreault - PPG	Gauthier, Leonard	51:32	5–1 BC
3rd	BU	Macklin Celebrini - PPG	L. Hutson, Greene	54:45	5-2 BC
3rd	BC	Will Smith - ENG	Unassisted	58:04	6-2 BC

Goaltenders
Team	Name	Saves	Goals against	Time on ice
BC	Jacob Fowler	34	2	
BU	Mathieu Caron	23	5	

== Tournament Awards ==
=== All-Tournament Team ===
- G – Jacob Fowler (Boston College)
- D – Eamon Powell (Boston College)
- D – Lane Hutson (Boston University)
- F – Will Smith* (Boston College)
- F – Gabe Perreault (Boston College)
- F – Macklin Celebrini (Boston University)

* Tournament MVP
