= 2023–24 Vermont Catamounts men's ice hockey season =

College hockey season

- Conference: 9th Hockey East
- Home ice: Gutterson Fieldhouse

Rankings
- USCHO: NR
- USA Hockey: NR

Record
- Overall: 13–19–3
- Conference: 7–14–3
- Home: 8–8–0
- Road: 5–11–3

Coaches and captains
- Head coach: Steve Wiedler
- Assistant coaches: Scott Moser; Brendan Bradley; Shane Madolora
- Captain: Will Zapernick
- Alternate captain(s): Jérémie Bucheler; Zach Dubinsky; Joel Määttä

The 2023–24 Vermont Catamounts men's ice hockey season was the 68th season of play for the program, the 51st at the Division I level and the 19th in Hockey East. The Catamounts represented the University of Vermont, played their home games at the Gutterson Fieldhouse and were coached by Steve Wiedler in his 1st season.

== Season ==
During the summer, Todd Woodcroft was fired after an internal investigation by the college determine that the coach had exchanged inappropriate text messages with a student. Because the investigation had taken four months, by the time it concluded there was relatively little time to conduct a hiring search before this season. The Athletic department chose simply to promote Steve Wiedler to interim head coach and keep the rest of the staff in place.

With off ice issues settled for the moment, the team set about fixing their biggest problem: the lack of offense. The '23 Catamounts were one of the worst scoring team in the country, averaging less than 2 goals per game. Being so, it was perhaps a good thing that there were so many new faces for the program in '24. The team had trouble out of the gate with the new roster and coach struggling to find consistency. Vermont, too, was hampered by the vast strides for the rest of the conference as Hockey East was the top ranked league in college hockey that season. However, despite the difficulties, the Catamounts were able to take a step forward and climb out of the cellar.

The offense saw a slight improvement as the year went on with Jens Richards making huge strides in his game. The forward went from 4 points as a freshman to leading the team in his sophomore season. While the overall numbers weren't outstanding, the more-than 5-fold improvement was not something to be discounted. In goal, Gabe Carriere held the fort and kept Vermont in the game on most nights. Even when facing nationally ranked teams, the Catamounts proved to be a tough team to beat and they managed to win their fair share of games. By the end of the season, Vermont was 9th in the standings but, with how difficult their schedule had been, they were in the middle of the PairWise rankings. While the dearth of offensives punch cost them in the playoffs, the team had progressed and looked better than they had in years.

== Departures ==
Player	Position	Nationality	Cause
Oskar Autio	Goaltender	Finland	Graduation (signed with Allen Americans)
Jacques Bouquot	Forward	United States	Graduate transfer to Penn State
Finn Evans	Forward	Canada	Graduation (signed with Indy Fuel)
Eric Gotz	Defenseman	United States	Graduation (signed with Krefeld Pinguine)
Cole Hudson	Goaltender	Canada	Transferred to American International
Joe Leahy	Defenseman	Canada	Graduation (signed with Greenville Swamp Rabbits)
William Lemay	Forward	Canada	Graduation (signed with Trois-Rivières Lions)
Carter Long	Defenseman	United States	Graduation (signed with Savannah Ghost Pirates)
Luke Mountain	Forward	United States	Transferred to Augsburg
Porter Schachle	Defenseman	Canada	Transferred to Alaska Anchorage
Robbie Stucker	Defenseman	United States	Graduation (signed with South Carolina Stingrays)
Jesper Tarkiainen	Forward	Finland	Left program (retired)

== Recruiting ==
Player	Position	Nationality	Age	Notes
Nick Ahern	Forward	United States	20	Chicago, IL; joined mid-season
Eli Barnett	Defenseman	Canada	20	Ottawa, ON; selected 195th overall in 2022
Jérémie Bucheler	Defenseman	Canada	23	Montreal, QC; graduate transfer from Northeastern
Matt Cato	Forward	Canada	20	Whitby, ON
Mateo Dixon	Forward	Canada	21	Toronto, ON
Zach Dubinsky	Forward	United States	23	Highland Park, IL; graduate transfer from Michigan State
Mario Gasparini	Defenseman	United States	20	Lakeville, MN
Connor Mackenzie	Goaltender	Canada	21	Toronto, ON
Jack Malinski	Defenseman	United States	21	Lakeville, MN
Axel Mangbo	Goaltender	Sweden	20	Höganäs, SWE
Ryan Miotto	Forward	Canada	24	Thorold, ON; graduate transfer from Canisius
Duncan Ramsay	Defenseman	Canada	19	Halifax, NS
Daniel Sambuco	Forward	United States	20	Springfield, PA
Chris Théodore	Forward	Canada	25	Beaconsfield, QC; graduate transfer from Union

== Roster ==
As of January 18, 2024.

No.	Nat.	Player	Class	Pos	Height	Weight	DoB	Hometown	Previous team	NHL rights
1	(Canada)	Connor MacKenzie	Freshman	G	6' 0" (1.83 m)	165 lb (75 kg)	2002-05-10	Toronto, Ontario	Grande Prairie Storm (AJHL)	—
2	(Canada)	Eli Barnett	Freshman	D	6' 6" (1.98 m)	218 lb (99 kg)	2003-09-16	Ottawa, Ontario	Victoria Grizzlies (BCHL)	SJS, 195th overall 2022
4	(Canada)	Jérémie Bucheler (A)	Graduate	D	6' 4" (1.93 m)	210 lb (95 kg)	2000-03-31	Saint-Laurent, Quebec	Northeastern (HEA)	—
7	(Canada)	Chris Théodore	Graduate	F	5' 7" (1.7 m)	180 lb (82 kg)	1997-10-15	Beaconsfield, Quebec	Union (ECAC)	—
9	(Finland)	Joel Määttä (A)	Junior	F	6' 2" (1.88 m)	202 lb (92 kg)	2002-07-06	Helsinki, Finland	Sioux City Musketeers (USHL)	EDM, 222nd overall 2022
10	(United States)	Mario Gasparini	Freshman	D	5' 11" (1.8 m)	170 lb (77 kg)	2003-02-28	Lakeville, Minnesota	Wenatchee Wild (BCHL)	—
11	(Canada)	Mateo Dixon	Freshman	F	5' 10" (1.78 m)	185 lb (84 kg)	2002-08-19	Toronto, Ontario	Coquitlam Express (BCHL)	—
12	(Kazakhstan)	Andrei Buyalsky	Junior	F	6' 3" (1.91 m)	190 lb (86 kg)	2000-08-18	Karaganda, Kazakhstan	Dubuque Fighting Saints (USHL)	COL, 92nd overall 2021
13	(Russia)	Timofei Spitserov	Sophomore	F	6' 0" (1.83 m)	176 lb (80 kg)	2002-03-26	Saint Petersburg, Russia	Culver Academies (Midget AAA)	SJS, 210th overall 2020
14	(Canada)	Dawson Good	Freshman	F	6' 1" (1.85 m)	205 lb (93 kg)	2002-04-17	Abbotsford, British Columbia	Chilliwack Chiefs (BCHL)	—
15	(Germany)	Luca Münzenberger	Sophomore	D	6' 2" (1.88 m)	200 lb (91 kg)	2002-11-24	Düsseldorf, Germany	Kölner Haie U20 (DNL)	EDM, 90th overall 2021
16	(Canada)	Will Zapernick (C)	Senior	F	5' 9" (1.75 m)	180 lb (82 kg)	1999-11-16	Edmonton, Alberta	Sherwood Park Crusaders (AJHL)	—
17	(Canada)	Matt Cato	Freshman	F	5' 11" (1.8 m)	174 lb (79 kg)	2003-09-15	Whitby, Ontario	Trenton Golden Hawks (OJHL)	—
18	(Canada)	Massimo Lombardi	Sophomore	F	5' 10" (1.78 m)	195 lb (88 kg)	2002-05-18	Beaconsfield, Quebec	Cowichan Valley Capitals (BCHL)	—
19	(Slovakia)	Simon Jellúš	Junior	F	6' 2" (1.88 m)	202 lb (92 kg)	2001-01-18	Ilava, Slovakia	Karlskrona J20 (J20 Nationell)	—
20	(Canada)	Xavier Henry	Sophomore	D	6' 5" (1.96 m)	216 lb (98 kg)	2001-03-20	Scarborough, Ontario	Chilliwack Chiefs (BCHL)	—
21	(United States)	Daniel Sambuco	Freshman	F	6' 0" (1.83 m)	190 lb (86 kg)	2003-06-10	Springfield, Pennsylvania	Lincoln Stars (USHL)	—
22	(Sweden)	Isak Walther	Junior	F	6' 3" (1.91 m)	179 lb (81 kg)	2001-08-02	Södertälje, Sweden	Södertälje J20 (J20 Nationell)	NSH, 179th overall 2019
23	(Canada)	Ryan Miotto	Graduate	F	6' 0" (1.83 m)	190 lb (86 kg)	1999-07-11	Thorold, Ontario	Canisius (AHA)	—
24	(Canada)	Duncan Ramsay	Freshman	D	6' 5" (1.96 m)	205 lb (93 kg)	2004-02-08	Halifax, Nova Scotia	Chilliwack Chiefs (BCHL)	—
25	(United States)	Jack Malinski	Freshman	D	5' 10" (1.78 m)	170 lb (77 kg)	2002-06-23	Lakeville, Minnesota	Austin Bruins (NAHL)	—
26	(Canada)	Thomas Sinclair	Sophomore	F	6' 3" (1.91 m)	194 lb (88 kg)	2002-12-26	Toronto, Ontario	Fargo Force (USHL)	—
28	(Canada)	Lucas Jones	Sophomore	D	6' 4" (1.93 m)	205 lb (93 kg)	2001-02-24	Calgary, Alberta	Fort McMurray Oil Barons (AJHL)	—
29	(United States)	Jens Richards	Sophomore	F	6' 2" (1.88 m)	194 lb (88 kg)	2002-12-14	Detroit Lakes, Minnesota	Austin Bruins (NAHL)	—
32	(United States)	Zach Dubinsky (A)	Senior	F	5' 8" (1.73 m)	175 lb (79 kg)	2000-03-14	Highland Park, Illinois	Michigan State (Big Ten)	—
33	(Sweden)	Philip Törnqvist	Sophomore	D	6' 0" (1.83 m)	181 lb (82 kg)	2001-08-24	Gothenburg, Sweden	Wichita Falls Warriors (NAHL)	—
35	(Canada)	Gabe Carriere	Senior	G	6' 2" (1.88 m)	185 lb (84 kg)	2000-11-05	Ottawa, Ontario	Waterloo Black Hawks (USHL)	—
37	(United States)	Nick Ahern	Freshman	F	5' 10" (1.78 m)	161 lb (73 kg)	2002-12-02	Chicago, Illinois	Johnstown Tomahawks (NAHL)	—
39	(Latvia)	Ralfs Bergmanis	Sophomore	D	5' 10" (1.78 m)	175 lb (79 kg)	2002-03-13	Liepāja, Latvia	Sioux City Musketeers (USHL)	—
50	(Sweden)	Axel Mangbo	Freshman	G	6' 3" (1.91 m)	181 lb (82 kg)	2003-04-15	Höganäs, Sweden	Sioux City Musketeers (USHL)	—

== Standings ==
2023–24 Hockey East Standings
	Conference record										Overall record					
	GP	W	L	T	OTW	OTL	SW	PTS	GF	GA	GP	W	L	T	GF	GA
#2 Boston College †*	24	20	3	1	1	0	1	61	105	56	41	34	6	1	183	89
#3 Boston University	24	18	4	2	1	1	1	57	104	53	40	28	10	2	163	97
#10 Maine	24	14	9	1	0	1	0	44	76	67	37	23	12	2	119	94
#16 Providence	24	11	9	4	3	1	2	37	66	58	35	18	13	4	100	83
#13 Massachusetts	24	12	10	2	4	2	0	36	57	62	37	20	14	3	108	105
#20 New Hampshire	24	12	11	1	1	0	0	36	69	56	36	20	15	1	106	90
Northeastern	24	9	14	1	1	3	0	30	65	71	36	17	16	3	113	97
Connecticut	24	9	14	1	1	1	1	29	49	77	36	15	19	2	90	105
Vermont	24	7	14	3	1	0	3	26	52	81	35	13	19	3	87	106
Merrimack	24	6	17	1	0	1	1	21	62	85	35	13	21	1	98	114
Massachusetts Lowell	24	4	17	3	1	4	0	18	39	78	36	8	24	4	72	113
Championship: March 23, 2024 † indicates regular season champion * indicates conference tournament champion (Lamoriello Trophy); Rankings: USCHO Division I Men's Poll

== Schedule and results ==
Date	Time	Opponent^{#}	Rank^{#}	Site	TV	Decision	Result	Attendance	Record
Exhibition
October 7	2:00 pm	McGill*		Gutterson Fieldhouse • Burlington, Vermont (Exhibition)	ESPN+	Carriere	W 4–0	2,896	
Regular Season
October 13	7:00 pm	at St. Lawrence*		Appleton Arena • Canton, New York	ESPN+	Carriere	W 3–1	1,076	1–0–0
October 14	7:00 pm	at Clarkson*		Cheel Arena • Potsdam, New York	ESPN+	Carriere	L 2–3	2,459	1–1–0
October 27	7:00 pm	at #7 Providence		Schneider Arena • Providence, Rhode Island	ESPN+	Carriere	L 1–4	2,074	1–2–0 (0–1–0)
October 28	7:00 pm	at #7 Providence		Schneider Arena • Providence, Rhode Island	ESPN+	Carriere	T 2–2 ^{SOW}	1,727	1–2–1 (0–1–1)
November 3	7:00 pm	Connecticut		Gutterson Fieldhouse • Burlington, Vermont	ESPN+	Carriere	W 4–1	2,796	2–2–1 (1–1–1)
November 4	6:00 pm	Connecticut		Gutterson Fieldhouse • Burlington, Vermont	ESPN+	Carriere	L 2–5	3,235	2–3–1 (1–2–1)
November 10	7:00 pm	at #14 Massachusetts		Mullins Center • Amherst, Massachusetts	ESPN+	Carriere	L 1–4	4,272	2–4–1 (1–3–1)
November 11	6:00 pm	at #14 Massachusetts		Mullins Center • Amherst, Massachusetts	ESPN+	Carriere	W 6–2	4,461	3–4–1 (2–3–1)
November 18	7:00 pm	at American International*		MassMutual Center • Springfield, Massachusetts	FloHockey	Carriere	L 1–2	604	3–5–1
December 1	7:00 pm	#10 Massachusetts		Gutterson Fieldhouse • Burlington, Vermont	ESPN+	Carriere	W 2–1 ^{OT}	2,748	4–5–1 (3–3–1)
December 3	4:00 pm	Massachusetts Lowell		Gutterson Fieldhouse • Burlington, Vermont	ESPN+	Carriere	L 1–2	2,461	4–6–1 (3–4–1)
December 8	7:00 pm	Union*		Gutterson Fieldhouse • Burlington, Vermont	ESPN+	Carriere	L 4–5	2,061	4–7–1
December 9	7:00 pm	Union*		Gutterson Fieldhouse • Burlington, Vermont	ESPN+	Carriere	W 4–1	2,122	5–7–1
December 16	7:00 pm	at Long Island*		Northwell Health Ice Center • East Meadow, New York	ESPN+	Carriere	W 3–2	700	6–7–1
December 17	7:15 pm	at Long Island*		Northwell Health Ice Center • East Meadow, New York	ESPN+	Carriere	W 5–1	350	7–7–1
December 29	7:00 pm	St. Thomas*		Gutterson Fieldhouse • Burlington, Vermont	ESPN+	Carriere	W 5–1	2,595	8–7–1
December 30	5:00 pm	St. Thomas*		Gutterson Fieldhouse • Burlington, Vermont	ESPN+	Carriere	W 4–1	2,652	9–7–1
January 6	6:00 pm	at Dartmouth*		Thompson Arena • Hanover, New Hampshire	ESPN+	Carriere	L 3–4	3,335	9–8–1
January 12	7:00 pm	at Northeastern		Matthews Arena • Boston, Massachusetts	ESPN+	Carriere	W 5–4	2,489	10–8–1 (4–4–1)
January 13	7:30 pm	at Northeastern		Matthews Arena • Boston, Massachusetts	ESPN+	Carriere	L 1–3	3,121	10–9–1 (4–5–1)
January 19	7:00 pm	#1 Boston University		Gutterson Fieldhouse • Burlington, Vermont	ESPN+	Carriere	L 1–5	3,640	10–10–1 (4–6–1)
January 20	7:00 pm	#1 Boston University		Gutterson Fieldhouse • Burlington, Vermont	ESPN+	Carriere	L 2–5	3,486	10–11–1 (4–7–1)
January 26	7:00 pm	#17 New Hampshire		Gutterson Fieldhouse • Burlington, Vermont	ESPN+	Carriere	W 2–1	2,604	11–11–1 (5–7–1)
January 27	7:00 pm	#17 New Hampshire		Gutterson Fieldhouse • Burlington, Vermont	ESPN+	Carriere	L 3–6	3,150	11–12–1 (5–8–1)
February 9	7:15 pm	at Massachusetts Lowell		Tsongas Center • Lowell, Massachusetts	ESPN+	Carriere	T 1–1 ^{SOW}	5,579	11–12–2 (5–8–2)
February 10	7:15 pm	at Massachusetts Lowell		Tsongas Center • Lowell, Massachusetts	ESPN+	Carriere	T 3–3 ^{SOW}	4,002	11–12–3 (5–8–3)
February 16	7:00 pm	Merrimack		Gutterson Fieldhouse • Burlington, Vermont	ESPN+	Carriere	L 2–5	2,270	11–13–3 (5–9–3)
February 17	7:30 pm	Merrimack		Gutterson Fieldhouse • Burlington, Vermont	ESPN+	Carriere	W 4–1	2,565	12–13–3 (6–9–3)
February 23	7:00 pm	at #1 Boston College		Conte Forum • Chestnut Hill, Massachusetts	ESPN+, NESN	Carriere	L 1–7	7,246	12–14–3 (6–10–3)
February 24	5:00 pm	at #1 Boston College		Conte Forum • Chestnut Hill, Massachusetts	ESPN+	Carriere	L 2–4	6,559	12–15–3 (6–11–3)
March 1	7:00 pm	#9 Maine		Gutterson Fieldhouse • Burlington, Vermont	ESPN+	Carriere	W 2–1	3,218	13–15–3 (7–11–3)
March 2	7:30 pm	#9 Maine		Gutterson Fieldhouse • Burlington, Vermont	ESPN+	Carriere	L 2–3	3,177	13–16–3 (7–12–3)
March 7	7:00 pm	at Connecticut		Toscano Family Ice Forum • Storrs, Connecticut	ESPN+	Carriere	L 1–5	2,691	13–17–3 (7–13–3)
March 9	4:00 pm	at #2 Boston University		Agganis Arena • Boston, Massachusetts	ESPN+	Mangbo	L 1–6	5,597	13–18–3 (7–14–3)
Hockey East Tournament
March 13	7:00 pm	at Connecticut*		Toscano Family Ice Forum • Storrs, Connecticut (Opening Round)	ESPN+	Carriere	L 1–4	2,021	13–19–3
*Non-conference game. ^{#}Rankings from USCHO.com Poll. All times are in Eastern Time. Source:

== Scoring statistics ==
Name	Position	Games	Goals	Assists	Points	PIM
Jens Richards	F	32	10	11	21	10
Jérémie Bucheler	D	33	6	12	18	27
Ryan Miotto	F	35	9	8	17	18
Timofey Spitserov	RW	35	7	7	14	6
Chris Théodore	LW	30	8	6	14	0
Isak Walther	RW	24	5	7	12	6
Will Zapernick	C/RW	35	3	9	12	14
Massimo Lombardi	C	32	5	7	12	17
Ralfs Bergmanis	D	32	2	10	12	60
Andrei Buyalsky	C	25	3	8	11	8
Zach Dubinsky	F	30	2	9	11	20
Simon Jellúš	C/LW	30	6	4	10	2
Joel Määttä	C	26	4	5	9	35
Thomas Sinclair	C	32	5	4	9	8
Nick Ahern	LW	14	1	5	6	10
Philip Törnqvist	D	29	2	4	6	12
Jack Malinski	D	26	2	4	6	16
Eli Barnett	D	24	0	5	5	16
Mateo Dixon	C	18	2	2	4	2
Luca Münzenberger	D	32	1	2	3	51
Dawson Good	F	9	1	2	3	2
Xavier Henry	D	22	1	1	2	22
Gabe Carriere	G	34	0	2	2	0
Daniel Sambuco	F	13	1	0	1	12
Duncan Ramsay	D	26	0	1	1	6
Mario Gasparini	D	11	1	0	1	4
Lucas Jones	D	6	0	0	0	17
Axel Mangbo	G	3	0	0	0	0
Total			86	133	219	401

== Goaltending statistics ==
Name	Games	Minutes	Wins	Losses	Ties	Goals against	Saves	Shut outs	SV %	GAA
Gabe Carriere	34	2017:25	13	18	3	93	897	0	.906	2.77
Axel Mangbo	3	83:55	0	1	0	7	42	0	.857	5.00
Empty Net	-	16:10	-	-	-	6	-	-	-	-
Total	35	2117:30	13	19	3	106	939	0	.899	3.00

== Rankings ==
Poll	Week																										
Poll	Pre	1	2	3	4	5	6	7	8	9	10	11	12	13	14	15	16	17	18	19	20	21	22	23	24	25	26 (Final)
USCHO.com	NR	NR	NR	NR	NR	NR	NR	NR	NR	NR	NR	–	NR	NR	NR	NR	NR	NR	NR	NR	NR	NR	NR	NR	NR	–	NR
USA Hockey	NR	NR	NR	NR	NR	NR	NR	NR	NR	NR	NR	NR	–	NR	NR	NR	NR	NR	NR	NR	NR	NR	NR	NR	NR	NR	NR

Note: USCHO did not release a poll in weeks 11 and 25.
Note: USA Hockey did not release a poll in week 12.
