= 2023–24 Boston College Eagles men's ice hockey season =

Hockey East Regular Season, Champion Hockey East tournament, Champion NCAA tournament, Runner-Up
- Conference: 1st Hockey East
- Home ice: Kelley Rink

Rankings
- USCHO.com: #2
- USA Hockey: #2

Record
- Overall: 34–6–1
- Conference: 20–3–1
- Home: 16–2–0
- Road: 12–2–1
- Neutral: 6–2–0

Coaches and captains
- Head coach: Greg Brown
- Assistant coaches: Mike Ayers; Brendan Buckley; Brent Darnell
- Captain: Eamon Powell
- Alternate captain(s): Jack Malone; Mike Posma; Gentry Shamburger

The 2023–24 Boston College Eagles men's ice hockey season was the 102nd season of play for the program and the 40th in Hockey East. The Eagles represented Boston College in the 2023–24 NCAA Division I men's ice hockey season, played their home games at Kelley Rink and were coached by Greg Brown in his 2nd season.

== Season ==
The addition of six NHL draft picks, including three first-rounders, was a huge boost to the Eagles' outlook entering the season. Despite finishing with a losing record the year before, the team was #6 in the preseason rankings because of a revamped roster in which more than half of the lineup was new players. BC didn't have to wait long for their first big test when they opened the season against the defending national champions, Quinnipiac. The Eagles played well, particularly on defense, but it was Jacob Fowler who portended a good season early. The freshman goaltender stopped 29 shots en route to an overtime win and had Boston College off and running.

The offense began to get into gear after the opening match and soon the Eagles became one of the top offensive teams in the nation. This was primarily thanks to the all-freshman line of Ryan Leonard, Gabe Perreault and Will Smith who were not only a terror at even strength but helped BC produce the #2 power play in the nation. The Eagles suffered their first loss of the season when they met Denver, another championship hopeful, and the two power play goals that BC allowed convinced the team to redouble its efforts. For the remainder of the season, BC surrendered just 14 power play goals on 126 opportunities, posting the best penalty kill in the nation. The team's special teams came up big in the next game when they took on a resurgent Michigan State squad and killed off 6 of 7 penalties to down the Spartans then scored two on the power play in the rematch to sweep the weekend series. By handling the #8 team in the nation, BC was able to earn its first #1 ranking of the season.

Mid-November saw the team stumble a bit as they lost a series to Maine when they scored just 4 goals in 2 games. The games showed a possible flaw with the team that the Eagles might be a bit too top heavy. After their freshman line, the Eagles had a good second line, headlined by sophomore Cutter Gauthier, but after that the scoring dropped off precipitously. The three freshman were responsible for three of the goals against the Black Bears while the fourth came on the power play. This demonstrated that the team was still vulnerable if the other three lines had off nights, but that was a very small crack in the Eagles' facade.

Over the next two and a half months, the Eagles went 12–2 and regained the #1 spot three separate times. The final time was thanks to BC taking down hated rival Boston University with a weekend sweep that saw the two teams face one another as #1 and #2 for the first time in history. The first match was so anticipated that it was broadcast in Canada, an exceedingly rare event for a regular season game. The defense was key for the win in game 1 as Fowler allowed just one goal while two empty-netters turned a tight battle into a rout. More offense was needed in game two and, fortunately, BC was able to get contributions from outside the freshman line. 4 goals were enough to give BC a lead it could defend against one of the top offensive teams in the nation and firmly plant itself as the top team in the country.

Just over a week later, the Terriers were able to get revenge by knocking BC out in the Beanpot Semifinal. The Eagles weren't able to hold off the likely top pick in the upcoming NHL draft, Macklin Celebrini, for three consecutive games and lost their chance at ending the program's 8-year Beanpot drought. The team appeared to take the loss personally and played an inspired brand of hockey for the rest of the season. Boston College won their last 9 regular season games, many by wide margins, and marched into their conference playoff atop all national rankings.

At the time, the Eagles were guaranteed to receive one of the four #1 seed in the NCAA tournament but top spot would only be ensured if they kept on winning. Everything looked good for BC when they opened against Connecticut. The team had a 3-goal lead just 8 minutes into the game and then tried to cruise to the win. The Huskies, however, were not content to just lay down and led BC soar to the win. UConn scored three goals in just under 5 minutes at the start of the third to tie the game and shock the partisan crowd. Graduate transfer Jack Malone scored a few minutes later to give BC the lead once more and enabled the Eagles to escape disaster. After the narrow win, Boston College punished Massachusetts in the Semifinal. The top line scored four times and Gauthier raised his total to a nation-leading 34 when he capped off the eight-goal deluge on the power play. The championship once more pitted BC vs. BU with the #1 overall seed on the line. The Eagles' power play decided the match with Boston College scoring four times on the man-advantage Smith finished the game with 4 goals and was named as the tournament MVP.

With the unanimous #1 ranking in hand, Boston College entered the NCAA tournament as the prohibitive favorite. They began their climb with the best possible matchup and faced a relatively weak Michigan Tech team that had earned its appearance only by winning a conference championship. Despite being heavily favored in the game, BC was stymied in the first 40 minutes of the game. Though the team had the lead, the Eagles scored just twice on 21 shots and Tech was behind by only a single marker. However, in the third period the Huskies' game began to crumble and the superior talent on BC started to show through. Boston College scored four goals in final period, two on the power play, and ran away with the game late.

In the regional final, BC faced off against Quinnipiac for the second time on the season. The Bobcats were keen to defend their championship and got a solid game from their goaltender early on. All 15 BC shots in the first period were turned aside and that allowed Quinnipiac to score the first two goals in the first two minutes of the second period. A power play allowed Leonard to cut the lead in half just seconds later while Andre Gasseau tied the score just past the halfway point of the game. The teams exchanged scores in the final minutes of the period to leave both with 3 goals each. The Bobcats scored their second power play goal of the game at the start of the third and then played an oppressive brand of forechecking that kept BC hemmed in their own end. The Eagles were hardly able to get a shot on goal over the next 15 minutes and just when it looked like the team might see their season come to an end, The Eagles were finally able to get an open look at the net and Aram Minnetian fired the puck in from the high slot. Quinnipiac turned up the pressure in overtime and with his team reeling, Greg Brown called a timeout just 2 minutes into the extra session to give the Eagles a break. The ploy worked as Boston College got back on the offensive and began to attack the Bobcat cage. A shot from the point was tipped by Colby Ambrosio and caught Quinnipiac's goaltender by surprise. He lost his balance and was unable to freeze the puck. One of the Bobcat defenders tried to clear the puck out of the crease but it landed right on the stick of Malone, who shot it right into the cage for the winning goal.

Boston College was back in the Frozen Four for the first time since 2016 and were set against Michigan. The two teams were among the best offensive clubs in the nation with the Wolverines being the only team better on the man-advantage. However, Boston College was a far superior team on the defensive side of the puck and they proved as much over course of the game. Michigan was unable to get a single goal past Fowler and went empty on four power plays in the game. The stellar goaltending meant that Smith's goal, just 80 seconds into the game, stood as the winning marker but the team scored three more for good measure.

The relative ease at which BC had vanquished Michigan again convinced many that the Eagles were the best team in the nation but they had one final impediment standing between them and the national championship: Denver. The Pioneers were the top scoring team in the nation but they had been relatively quiet on the offensive side of the puck in the tournament thus far. Denver had won three consecutive 2–1 decisions thanks to a surprisingly strong performance from their goaltender but they were about to face the #2 offense in the nation. However, BC quickly discovered why the Pios had reached the championship game when they were held to just 12 shots in the first two periods. Worse, Denver was able to score twice in the second to take a 2-goal lead into the third period. In the final 20 minutes, the Boston College offense awoke and began to assault the Denver cage with shot after shot. The puck got on goal 23 times in the final frame but nothing got past the Denver goaltender. Despite their furious finish, BC was shutout for the first time all season and the team watched helplessly as the Pioneers claimed the championship.

== Departures ==
| Player | Position | Nationality | Cause |
|---|---|---|---|
| Cade Alami | Defenseman | United States | Transferred to Arizona State |
| Mitch Andres | Defenseman | United States | Graduate transfer to Robert Morris |
| Matt Argentina | Forward | United States | Returned to juniors (Chilliwack Chiefs) |
| Mitch Benson | Goaltender | Canada | Graduation (signed with Iowa Heartlanders) |
| Cam Burke | Forward | United States | Graduation (retired) |
| Jack Dempsey | Forward | United States | Left program (retired) |
| Liam Izyk | Forward | Canada | Transferred to Sacred Heart |
| Trevor Kuntar | Forward | United States | Signed professional contract (Boston Bruins) |
| Jack Moffatt | Goaltender | United States | Graduation (retired) |
| Nikita Nesterenko | Forward | United States | Signed professional contract (Anaheim Ducks) |
| Christian O'Neill | Forward | United States | Graduation (retired) |
| Seamus Powell | Defenseman | United States | Returned to juniors (Dubuque Fighting Saints) |
| Dylan Silverstein | Goaltender | United States | Returned to juniors (Sioux City Musketeers) |
| Marshall Warren | Defenseman | United States | Graduate transfer to Michigan |
| Henry Wilder | Goaltender | United States | Transferred to Colorado College |

== Recruiting ==
| Player | Position | Nationality | Age | Notes |
|---|---|---|---|---|
| Jamie Armstrong | Forward | United States | 25 | Warwick, RI; graduate transfer from Boston University |
| Timmy Delay | Forward | United States | 20 | Hingham, MA |
| Drew Fortescue | Defenseman | United States | 18 | Pearl River, NY; selected 90th overall in 2023 |
| Jacob Fowler | Goaltender | United States | 18 | Melbourne, FL; selected 69th overall in 2023 |
| Ryan Leonard | Forward | United States | 18 | Amherst, MA; selected 8th overall in 2023 |
| Nolan Joyce | Defenseman | United States | 20 | Dedham, MA |
| Jan Korec | Goaltender | Slovakia | 19 | Bratislava, SVK |
| Jack Malone | Forward | United States | 22 | Danville, CA; graduate transfer from Cornell; selected 180th overall in 2019 |
| Aram Minnetian | Defenseman | United States | 18 | Woodcliff Lake, NJ; selected 125th overall in 2023 |
| Alex Musielak | Goaltender | United States | 20 | Buffalo, NY |
| Gabe Perreault | Forward | Canada | 18 | Sherbrooke, QC; selected 23rd overall in 2023 |
| Will Smith | Forward | United States | 18 | Lexington, MA; selected 4th overall in 2023 |
| Will Vote | Forward | United States | 18 | Arlington, MA |

== Roster ==
As of October 2, 2023.

| No. | Nat. | Player | Class | Pos | Height | Weight | DoB | Hometown | Previous team | NHL rights |
|---|---|---|---|---|---|---|---|---|---|---|
| 1 | (United States) | Jacob Fowler | Freshman | G | 6' 2" (1.88 m) | 214 lb (97 kg) | 2004-11-24 | Melbourne, Florida | Youngstown Phantoms (USHL) | MTL, 69th overall 2023 |
| 2 | (United States) | Eamon Powell (C) | Senior | D | 5' 11" (1.8 m) | 173 lb (78 kg) | 2002-05-10 | Marcellus, New York | USNTDP (USHL) | TBL, 116th overall 2020 |
| 3 | (United States) | Nolan Joyce | Freshman | D | 6' 1" (1.85 m) | 192 lb (87 kg) | 2003-09-25 | Dedham, Massachusetts | Chicago Steel (USHL) | — |
| 4 | (United States) | Charlie Leddy | Sophomore | D | 6' 2" (1.88 m) | 185 lb (84 kg) | 2004-01-11 | Fairfield, Connecticut | USNTDP (USHL) | NJD, 126th overall 2022 |
| 5 | (United States) | Drew Fortescue | Freshman | D | 6' 2" (1.88 m) | 170 lb (77 kg) | 2005-04-28 | Pearl River, New York | USNTDP (USHL) | NYR, 90th overall 2023 |
| 6 | (United States) | Will Smith | Freshman | F | 6' 0" (1.83 m) | 181 lb (82 kg) | 2005-03-17 | Lexington, Massachusetts | USNTDP (USHL) | SJS, 4th overall 2023 |
| 7 | (United States) | Aidan Hreschuk | Junior | D | 5' 11" (1.8 m) | 178 lb (81 kg) | 2003-02-19 | Long Beach, California | USNTDP (USHL) | CBJ, 94th overall 2021 |
| 8 | (United States) | Lukas Gustafsson | Sophomore | D | 5' 10" (1.78 m) | 190 lb (86 kg) | 2002-12-16 | Atlanta, Georgia | Chicago Steel (USHL) | — |
| 9 | (United States) | Ryan Leonard | Freshman | F | 6' 0" (1.83 m) | 192 lb (87 kg) | 2005-01-21 | Amherst, Massachusetts | USNTDP (USHL) | WSH, 8th overall 2023 |
| 11 | (Canada) | Colby Ambrosio | Senior | F | 5' 9" (1.75 m) | 174 lb (79 kg) | 2002-08-07 | Welland, Ontario | Tri-City Storm (USHL) | COL, 118th overall 2020 |
| 12 | (United States) | Mike Posma (A) | Junior | F | 6' 0" (1.83 m) | 183 lb (83 kg) | 2001-12-04 | Pomona, New York | Omaha Lancers (USHL) | — |
| 13 | (United States) | Jack Malone (A) | Graduate | F | 6' 1" (1.85 m) | 193 lb (88 kg) | 2000-10-13 | Madison, New Jersey | Cornell (ECAC) | VAN, 180th overall 2019 |
| 14 | (United States) | Gentry Shamburger (A) | Senior | F | 6' 0" (1.83 m) | 196 lb (89 kg) | 2000-09-29 | Atlanta, Georgia | Avon Old Farms (USHS–CT) | — |
| 15 | (Sweden) | Jacob Bengtsson | Senior | D | 6' 3" (1.91 m) | 202 lb (92 kg) | 1999-05-08 | Stockholm, Sweden | Waterloo Black Hawks (USHL) | — |
| 17 | (United States) | Aram Minnetian | Freshman | D | 5' 11" (1.8 m) | 194 lb (88 kg) | 2005-03-19 | Woodcliff Lake, New Jersey | USNTDP (USHL) | DAL, 125th overall 2023 |
| 18 | (United States) | Paul Davey | Sophomore | F | 6' 2" (1.88 m) | 195 lb (88 kg) | 2003-01-11 | Greenwich, Connecticut | Des Moines Buccaneers (USHL) | — |
| 19 | (United States) | Cutter Gauthier | Sophomore | F | 6' 2" (1.88 m) | 201 lb (91 kg) | 2004-01-19 | Scottsdale, Arizona | USNTDP (USHL) | PHI, 5th overall 2022 |
| 21 | (Sweden) | Oskar Jellvik | Sophomore | F | 5' 11" (1.8 m) | 180 lb (82 kg) | 2003-02-08 | Täby, Sweden | Djurgårdens J20 (J20 Nationell) | BOS, 149th overall 2021 |
| 22 | (United States) | Will Vote | Freshman | F | 5' 8" (1.73 m) | 161 lb (73 kg) | 2005-02-22 | Arlington, Massachusetts | USNTDP (USHL) | — |
| 23 | (United States) | Will Traeger | Sophomore | F | 5' 8" (1.73 m) | 172 lb (78 kg) | 2002-04-10 | Mendota Heights, Minnesota | Jersey Hitmen (NCDC) | — |
| 24 | (United States) | Andre Gasseau | Sophomore | F | 6' 4" (1.93 m) | 215 lb (98 kg) | 2003-07-03 | Garden Grove, California | Fargo Force (USHL) | BOS, 213th overall 2021 |
| 25 | (United States) | Jamie Armstrong | Graduate | F | 6' 2" (1.88 m) | 192 lb (87 kg) | 1998-08-07 | Warwick, Rhode Island | Boston University (HEA) | — |
| 27 | (United States) | Connor Joyce | Junior | F | 6' 0" (1.83 m) | 168 lb (76 kg) | 2001-07-06 | Dedham, Massachusetts | Connecticut Jr. Rangers (NCDC) | — |
| 28 | (United States) | Timmy Delay | Freshman | F | 6' 1" (1.85 m) | 170 lb (77 kg) | 2003-06-16 | Hingham, Massachusetts | Chilliwack Chiefs (BCHL) | — |
| 30 | (Slovakia) | Jan Korec | Freshman | G | 6' 1" (1.85 m) | 185 lb (84 kg) | 2004-09-28 | Bratislava, Slovakia | Des Moines Buccaneers (USHL) | — |
| 31 | (United States) | Alex Musielak | Freshman | G | 6' 4" (1.93 m) | 183 lb (83 kg) | 2003-07-23 | Buffalo, New York | Kemptville 73's (CCHL) | — |
| 34 | (Canada) | Gabe Perreault | Freshman | F | 5' 11" (1.8 m) | 165 lb (75 kg) | 2005-05-07 | Sherbrooke, Quebec | USNTDP (USHL) | NYR, 23rd overall 2023 |

== Standings ==
2023–24 Hockey East Standings
| | Conference record | | | | | | | | | | Overall record | | | | | |
| | GP | W | L | T | OTW | OTL | SW | PTS | GF | GA | GP | W | L | T | GF | GA |
|---|---|---|---|---|---|---|---|---|---|---|---|---|---|---|---|---|
| #2 Boston College †* | 24 | 20 | 3 | 1 | 1 | 0 | 1 | 61 | 105 | 56 | 41 | 34 | 6 | 1 | 183 | 89 |
| #3 Boston University | 24 | 18 | 4 | 2 | 1 | 1 | 1 | 57 | 104 | 53 | 40 | 28 | 10 | 2 | 163 | 97 |
| #10 Maine | 24 | 14 | 9 | 1 | 0 | 1 | 0 | 44 | 76 | 67 | 37 | 23 | 12 | 2 | 119 | 94 |
| #16 Providence | 24 | 11 | 9 | 4 | 3 | 1 | 2 | 37 | 66 | 58 | 35 | 18 | 13 | 4 | 100 | 83 |
| #13 Massachusetts | 24 | 12 | 10 | 2 | 4 | 2 | 0 | 36 | 57 | 62 | 37 | 20 | 14 | 3 | 108 | 105 |
| #20 New Hampshire | 24 | 12 | 11 | 1 | 1 | 0 | 0 | 36 | 69 | 56 | 36 | 20 | 15 | 1 | 106 | 90 |
| Northeastern | 24 | 9 | 14 | 1 | 1 | 3 | 0 | 30 | 65 | 71 | 36 | 17 | 16 | 3 | 113 | 97 |
| Connecticut | 24 | 9 | 14 | 1 | 1 | 1 | 1 | 29 | 49 | 77 | 36 | 15 | 19 | 2 | 90 | 105 |
| Vermont | 24 | 7 | 14 | 3 | 1 | 0 | 3 | 26 | 52 | 81 | 35 | 13 | 19 | 3 | 87 | 106 |
| Merrimack | 24 | 6 | 17 | 1 | 0 | 1 | 1 | 21 | 62 | 85 | 35 | 13 | 21 | 1 | 98 | 114 |
| Massachusetts Lowell | 24 | 4 | 17 | 3 | 1 | 4 | 0 | 18 | 39 | 78 | 36 | 8 | 24 | 4 | 72 | 113 |
Championship: March 23, 2024 † indicates regular season champion * indicates conference tournament champion (Lamoriello Trophy); Rankings: USCHO Division I Men's Poll

== Schedule and results ==
| Date | Time | Opponent^{#} | Rank^{#} | Site | TV | Decision | Result | Attendance | Record |
Regular Season
| October 7 | 7:00 pm | at #2 Quinnipiac* | #6 | M&T Bank Arena • Hamden, Connecticut | ESPN+ | Fowler | W 2–1 ^{OT} | 3,700 | 1–0–0 |
| October 13 | 7:00 pm | Long Island* | #4 | Conte Forum • Chestnut Hill, Massachusetts | ESPN+ | Fowler | W 4–2 | 7,308 | 2–0–0 |
| October 20 | 7:00 pm | Rensselaer* | #3 | Conte Forum • Chestnut Hill, Massachusetts | ESPN+ | Fowler | W 6–1 | 5,802 | 3–0–0 |
| October 21 | 7:00 pm | #2 Denver* | #3 | Conte Forum • Chestnut Hill, Massachusetts | ESPN+ | Fowler | L 3–4 | 7,884 | 3–1–0 |
| October 26 | 7:00 pm | #8 Michigan State* | #3 | Conte Forum • Chestnut Hill, Massachusetts | ESPN+ | Fowler | W 6–4 | 5,195 | 4–1–0 |
| October 27 | 7:00 pm | #8 Michigan State* | #3 | Conte Forum • Chestnut Hill, Massachusetts | ESPN+ | Fowler | W 5–1 | 7,884 | 5–1–0 |
| November 3 | 7:00 pm | Massachusetts Lowell | #1 | Conte Forum • Chestnut Hill, Massachusetts | ESPN+ | Fowler | W 3–2 | 6,608 | 6–1–0 (1–0–0) |
| November 4 | 6:05 pm | at Massachusetts Lowell | #1 | Tsongas Center • Lowell, Massachusetts | ESPN+ | Fowler | W 3–2 | 6,163 | 7–1–0 (2–0–0) |
| November 10 | 7:00 pm | at #13 Maine | #1 | Alfond Arena • Orono, Maine | ESPN+ | Fowler | L 2–4 | 5,043 | 7–2–0 (2–1–0) |
| November 11 | 7:00 pm | at #13 Maine | #1 | Alfond Arena • Orono, Maine | ESPN+ | Fowler | T 2–2 ^{SOW} | 5,043 | 7–2–1 (2–1–1) |
| November 17 | 7:00 pm | Connecticut | #4 | Conte Forum • Chestnut Hill, Massachusetts | ESPN+ | Fowler | W 5–4 ^{OT} | 6,127 | 8–2–1 (3–1–1) |
| November 18 | 7:00 pm | at Connecticut | #4 | Toscano Family Ice Forum • Storrs, Connecticut | ESPN+ | Fowler | W 3–0 | 2,630 | 9–2–1 (4–1–1) |
| November 24 | 5:00 pm | at #18 Notre Dame* | #2 | Compton Family Ice Arena • Notre Dame, Indiana (Rivalry) | Peacock | Fowler | W 6–1 | 5,126 | 10–2–1 |
| November 26 | 1:00 pm | at Harvard* | #2 | Bright-Landry Hockey Center • Boston, Massachusetts | ESPN+ | Fowler | W 4–1 | 2,903 | 11–2–1 |
| December 1 | 7:00 pm | Northeastern | #1 | Conte Forum • Chestnut Hill, Massachusetts | ESPN+ | Fowler | L 3–5 | 7,884 | 11–3–1 (4–2–1) |
| December 2 | 8:00 pm | at Northeastern | #1 | Matthews Arena • Boston, Massachusetts | ESPN+ | Fowler | W 3–1 | 4,392 | 12–3–1 (5–2–1) |
| December 9 | 4:30 pm | #9 Providence | #2т | Conte Forum • Chestnut Hill, Massachusetts | ESPN+, NESN | Fowler | W 5–4 | 7,884 | 13–3–1 (6–2–1) |
| January 12 | 7:00 pm | #9 Providence | #1 | Conte Forum • Chestnut Hill, Massachusetts | ESPN+ | Fowler | W 7–1 | 7,489 | 14–3–1 (7–2–1) |
| January 13 | 6:00 pm | at #9 Providence | #1 | Schneider Arena • Providence, Rhode Island | ESPN+ | Fowler | L 3–4 | 2,904 | 14–4–1 (7–3–1) |
| January 19 | 7:00 pm | at Merrimack | #2 | J. Thom Lawler Rink • North Andover, Massachusetts | ESPN+ | Fowler | W 6–4 | 2,674 | 15–4–1 (8–3–1) |
| January 21 | 1:00 pm | Merrimack | #2 | Conte Forum • Chestnut Hill, Massachusetts | ESPN+, NESN | Fowler | W 6–2 | 6,640 | 16–4–1 (9–3–1) |
| January 26 | 7:00 pm | #1 Boston University | #2 | Conte Forum • Chestnut Hill, Massachusetts (Rivalry) | ESPN+, NESN, TSN2 | Fowler | W 4–1 | 7,884 | 17–4–1 (10–3–1) |
| January 27 | 7:00 pm | at #1 Boston University | #2 | Agganis Arena • Boston, Massachusetts (Rivalry) | NESN, ESPN+ | Fowler | W 4–3 | 6,150 | 18–4–1 (11–3–1) |
| February 2 | 7:15 pm | at Massachusetts Lowell | #1 | Tsongas Center • Lowell, Massachusetts | ESPN+ | Fowler | W 6–1 | 6,421 | 19–4–1 (12–3–1) |
Beanpot
| February 5 | 8:00 pm | vs. #3 Boston University* | #1 | TD Garden • Boston, Massachusetts (Beanpot Semifinal, Rivalry) | NESN | Fowler | L 3–4 | 17,850 | 19–5–1 |
| February 9 | 7:00 pm | #17 New Hampshire | #1 | Conte Forum • Chestnut Hill, Massachusetts | ESPN+ | Fowler | W 6–1 | 6,608 | 20–5–1 (13–3–1) |
| February 12 | 4:30 pm | vs. Harvard* | #1 | TD Garden • Boston, Massachusetts (Beanpot Consolation Game) | NESN | Korec | W 5–0 | — | 21–5–1 |
| February 16 | 7:00 pm | at #11 Massachusetts | #1 | Mullins Center • Amherst, Massachusetts | ESPN+ | Fowler | W 5–1 | 8,412 | 22–5–1 (14–3–1) |
| February 18 | 1:00 pm | #11 Massachusetts | #1 | Conte Forum • Chestnut Hill, Massachusetts | ESPN+ | Fowler | W 6–4 | 7,008 | 23–5–1 (15–3–1) |
| February 23 | 7:00 pm | Vermont | #1 | Conte Forum • Chestnut Hill, Massachusetts | ESPN+, NESN | Fowler | W 7–1 | 7,246 | 24–5–1 (16–3–1) |
| February 24 | 7:00 pm | Vermont | #1 | Conte Forum • Chestnut Hill, Massachusetts | ESPN+ | Fowler | W 4–2 | 6,559 | 25–5–1 (17–3–1) |
| March 1 | 7:00 pm | at #17 New Hampshire | #1 | Whittemore Center • Durham, New Hampshire | ESPN+ | Fowler | W 5–3 | 6,501 | 26–5–1 (18–3–1) |
| March 3 | 5:00 pm | #17 New Hampshire | #1 | Conte Forum • Chestnut Hill, Massachusetts | ESPN+ | Fowler | W 1–0 | 5,402 | 27–5–1 (19–3–1) |
| March 9 | 7:00 pm | at Merrimack | #1 | J. Thom Lawler Rink • North Andover, Massachusetts | ESPN+ | Korec | W 6–4 | 2,747 | 28–5–1 (20–3–1) |
Hockey East Tournament
| March 16 | 7:30 pm | Connecticut* | #1 | Conte Forum • Chestnut Hill, Massachusetts (Quarterfinal) | ESPN+, NESN+ | Fowler | W 5–4 | 6,705 | 29–5–1 |
| March 22 | 4:00 pm | vs. #13 Massachusetts* | #1 | TD Garden • Boston, Massachusetts (Semifinal) | ESPN+, NESN | Fowler | W 8–1 | 17,850 | 30–5–1 |
| March 23 | 7:30 pm | vs. #2 Boston University* | #1 | TD Garden • Boston, Massachusetts (Championship, Rivalry) | ESPN+, NESN | Fowler | W 6–2 | 17,850 | 31–5–1 |
NCAA Tournament
| March 29 | 2:00 pm | vs. #20 Michigan Tech* | #1 | Amica Mutual Pavilion • Providence, Rhode Island (East Regional Semifinal) | ESPNU | Fowler | W 6–1 | 6,988 | 32–5–1 |
| March 31 | 4:00 pm | vs. #8 Quinnipiac* | #1 | Amica Mutual Pavilion • Providence, Rhode Island (East Regional Final) | ESPN2 | Fowler | W 5–4 ^{OT} | 5,835 | 33–5–1 |
| April 11 | 8:30 pm | vs. #10 Michigan* | #1 | Xcel Energy Center • Saint Paul, Minnesota (National Semifinal) | ESPN2 | Fowler | W 4–0 | 18,598 | 34–5–1 |
| April 13 | 6:00 pm | vs. #3 Denver* | #1 | Xcel Energy Center • Saint Paul, Minnesota (National Championship) | ESPN2 | Fowler | L 0–2 | 18,694 | 34–6–1 |
*Non-conference game. ^{#}Rankings from USCHO.com Poll. All times are in Eastern Time. Source:

== NCAA Tournament ==
=== Regional semifinal ===
| March 29, 2024; 2:00 pm | (1) Boston College | 6–1 (1–1, 1–0, 4–0) | (4) Michigan Tech | Amica Mutual Pavilion; Attendance: 6,988 |

Game reference

Jacob Fowler
Goalies
Blake Pietila
Referees:
Ryan Hersey
Nathan Wieler
Linesmen:
Tyler Liffrig
Erik Contino

| (Jellvik, Powell) Cutter Gauthier (36) – 0:36 | 1–0 |
| | 1–1 | 12:55 – SH – Max Koskipirtti (4) (unassisted) |
| (Malone, Hreschuk) Ryan Leonard (28) – GW – 26:57 | 2–1 |
| (Malone, Powell) Connor Joyce (12) – 44:47 | 3–1 |
| (Smith, Leonard) Oskar Jellvik (13) – 45:35 | 4–1 |
| (Gauthier, Powell) Ryan Leonard (29) – PP – 47:58 | 5–1 |
| (Jellvik, Leonard) Cutter Gauthier (37) – PP – 51:25 | 6–1 |

21 min
Penalties
31 min
38
Shots
24

Game summary
The game began with the teams exchanging rushes up the ice. After Tech lost control of the puck in front of the Eagle's net, Oskar Jellvik skated up the ice and passed the puck to Cutter Gauthier, who had gotten behind the Huskies defense on a partial break away. The nation's leading goal scorer fired the puck between Blake Pietila's legs for the opening goal. BC kept the pressure on and got several more scoring chances afterwards but Pietila had settled down and kept Tech in the game. The Huskies weren't able to establish any extended zone time until about the 8-minute mark but even then BC's speed kept Tech to the outside. About a minute later, a BC turnover in their own end resulted in two glorious scoring chances for Tech but the pipe helped to keep the puck out of the goal. As Tech started warming to the task, they got another chance after the Eagles iced the puck; MTU won the ensuing faceoff and crashed in on Jacob Fowler. The puck ended up getting past the BC goalie but bounced just to the side of the cage. Michigan Tech continued to circle and got another scoring chance a few second later but the Jack Malone blocked the shot. A further chance went wide and the puck ended up coming to Colby Ambrosio who charged down the ice on a break away. Chase Pietila managed to just catch him from behind and hook Ambrosio as he was shooting to eliminate the scoring chance. Rather than awarding Ambrosio a penalty shot, the referees handed Pietila a minor penalty. half-way through the kill, BC turned over the puck at center ice and Tech broke towards Fowler on a 2-on-0. Max Koskipirtti kept the puck and, right when he got to the faceoff dot, he fired a shot right over Fowler's glove for Tech's second short-handed goal on the season. The Huskies captured the momentum afterwards and began generating scoring opportunities in the BC zone. Now it was Fowler's turn to hold the fort and the young netminder matched Pietila save-for-save. Towards the end of the period BC regained its footing and play evened out the score remained tied at the buzzer.

Both teams picked up in the second right where they left off and got on the attack. BC turned the puck over several times in the first two minutes, giving Tech multiple scoring chances. The best went to Kash Rasmussen who found himself completely alone in front of the BC net but his shot went wide. A few seconds later, a loose puck bounced right to Koskipirtti for shot from the slot but Fowler got in the way. Eventually, the Eagles began to calm down and get into the offensive zone around the 5th minute. Jellvik got a solid scoring chance but his shot was deflected off the post by Blake Pietila. The Eagles continued to press and Ryan Leonard rushed the puck up the ice. Pietila stopped his initial shot, as well as the rebound from Aidan Hreschuk. Jack Malone found the loose puck and shuffled it over to an open Leonard who fired into a half-open cage for BC's second lead of the night. Play tilted towards Boston College afterwards but the Eagles continued to make sloppy plays and turn the puck over in dangerous areas. Tech got a few good looks at the net but the puck refused to cooperate and several chanced went by the wayside. Right off of a faceoff, Leonard broke in on Pietila and nearly tucked the puck into the goal but the Tech defense was able to turn him aside without taking a penalty. Scant second later, Gabe Perreault hit Tyrone Bronte in the head and received a match penalty. Boston College needed their #1 penalty kill to come through and it did. Michigan Tech got a few chances on Fowler, much of their time was spent trying to set up in the offensive zone and the Huskies were unable to convert on the man-advantage. BC was able to carry their narrow lead to the end of the period but they would have to finish the game missing one of their top scorers.

Michigan Tech started the third by joining BC in bad habits and committed two bad turnovers that led to chances for the Eagles. Pietila managed to keep the puck out of the net and the disjointed play continued for both sides. Eventually, BC was able to set up in the offensive zone and Connor Joyce got lost behind the net. When he popped out in front, Jack Malone found him for an easy tap in goal. Less than a minute later, BC cleared the puck into the Tech end. When Blake Pietila went behind the goal to gain possession, the rubber hit the referee in the backside and deflected into the net. However, the rule (83.6) stipulated that a goal cannot be scored due to direct interference from the officials so the goal was waved off. The reprieve for Tech didn't last long and just a minute later Will Smith got the puck to Jellvik on a break away and he put BC up by three. After the succeeding faceoff, Ryland Mosley took a run at Ryan Leonard at center ice and a melee broke out. Mosley received a match penalty while all other infractions cancelled out. A minute into the power play, Ryan Leonard netted his second goal off of a rush and the route was on. Gauthier ended the power play with his second of the game after a drop-pass in the slot from Jellvik. BC continued to press afterwards, looking for another goal, but the intensity was muted. Both teams played like they knew the game was over and soon enough it was.

=== Regional final ===
| March 31, 2024; 4:00 pm | (1) Boston College | 5–4 (OT) (0–0, 3–3, 1–1, 1–0) | (3) Quinnipiac | Amica Mutual Pavilion; Attendance: 5,835 |

Game reference

Jacob Fowler
Goalies
Vinny Duplessis
Referees:
Brandon Schmitt
Nicholas Krebsbach
Linesmen:
Dana Penkivech
Jeff Schultz

| | 0–1 | 21:19 – PP – Jacob Quillan (16) (Treloar, Lee) |
| | 0–2 | 21:54 – Iivari Räsänen (4) (unassisted) |
| (Gauthier, Powell) Ryan Leonard (30) – PP – 22:20 | 1–2 |
| (Jellvik, Gustafsson) Andre Gasseau (12) – 31:35 | 2–2 |
| | 2–3 | 35:59 – Christophe Fillion (12) (Legault, Räsänen) |
| (Smith, Powell) Ryan Leonard (31) – 37:55 | 3–3 |
| | 3–4 | 40:18 – PP – Jacob Quillan (17) (Graf, Legault) |
| (Gauthier, Jellvik) Aram Minnetian (3) – 55:16 | 4–4 |
| (unassisted) Jack Malone (12) – GW – 63:06 | 5–4 |

8 min
Penalties
10 min
32
Shots
30

Game summary
Both teams started the game quickly, alternating rushes up the ice. The first good scoring chance went to BC's Ryan Leonard who skated through the Bobcat defense and got the puck behind Vinny Duplessis after following up his rebound. Fortunately for Quinnipiac, their defense was first on the loose puck and cleared it out of the zone. Neither team was particularly sound with the puck with both committing turnovers. The Eagles began to get the offense going in the middle part of the first but Quinnipiac's defense was quick to respond. During one of the counter rushes towards the BC net, Gabe Perreault hooked an otherwise wide-open Christophe Fillion and gave the bobcats the first power play of the game. Quinnipiac set up in the Boston College zone and fired a barrage of shots on goal. Jacob Fowler and the defense managed to turn aside several good shots and melt down a handful of other potential chances. Aram Minnetian got control of the puck right when Perreault was coming out of the box and got the winger on a breakaway. Perreault ended up getting three shots on goal from right in front of the next but Duplessis stood strong and stopped the all. During the play that followed, Zach Tupker was called for a minor penalty in front of the BC net to give the Eagles a chance with the man-advantage. Within 30 seconds, Cutter Gauthier was set up with a glorious redirect in front but Duplessis made a highlight-reel save with his left pad. Boston College continued to press and got a few more good chances until Jack Malone knocked a rebound into the net. The referee immediately waved off the goal for being hit with a high stick and the call stood after a review. The Eagles kept their foot on the gas and put a great deal of pressure on the Bobcat defense and ended up forcing C. J. McGee into a hooking penalty. The nation's #2 power play had trouble getting set up in the Quinnipiac zone thanks to solid checking. Near the end of the power play and period, Will Smith cross-checked Victor Czerneckianair and was handed a minor penalty.

Quinnipiac got set up on their power play as soon as play resumed and they remained in the BC end for well over a minute. Just before the end of the man-advantage, a tip from Jacob Quillan found its way between Fowler's legs for the opening goal. Just 35 second later, a shot from Iivari Räsänen along the high wall got past a screened Fowler and Quinnipiac suddenly had a 2-goal lead. On the ensuing play, Czerneckianair was whistled for high-sticking and it took just 8 seconds for Gauthier to set up Leonard for the Eagles' first goal. Even with the BC power play, the first half of the second was largely played in the BC end but, as time wore on, the Eagles began to get to their offensive game. Just before the mid-way point of the match, Jayden Lee took a slashing penalty and gave Boston College yet another chance on the power play. The Bobcats kept BC to the outside and managed to stave off a repeat but just after Lee had exited the box, Andre Gasseau fired the puck from the top of the left circle past a partially screened Duplessis to tie the game. A few minutes later, during a broken play in the Bobcats' end, BC flubbed a scoring chance and Smith committed a hooking penalty as Quinnipiac started back up the ice. Quinnipiac found it far tougher to set up in the offensive zone on their second man-advantage and the Boston College kept the game tied. Immediately after the end of the power play, BC tried to find Smith for a breakaway but they were called for icing. On the ensuing faceoff, Fillion was able to find a loose puck right in front of the goal, kick it to his stick and fire it past Fowler in one motion. A few minutes later, as BC was moving the puck up the ice, Collin Graf was given a minor for interference on a fairly controversial play. It took a minute for Leonard to get the puck behind the Bobcat cage and wrap it around for his second goal of the game. Just seconds later, Drew Fortescue was given a questionable penalty on what was considered a makeup call by the broadcast analyst. Quinnipiac get set up in the offensive zone and remained their most of the power play but they could not find any clear lanes to the net and didn't get a shot on goal for almost a minute. BC was able to hold on and make it to the buzzer without allowing a further goal.

With just 18 second left in their man-advantage, Quinnipiac quickly got into the BC zone and got the puck to Graf at the right point. He fired a shot that missed the net but bounced out the other side right to Quillan, who fired it from a very sharp angle into the net. The Eagles tried to get back to their game afterwards but several possessions were cancelled out by turnovers or solid defensive play from the Bobcats. After a few minutes, Boston College settled down and began applying pressure on Duplessis. On a counterattack at the 5-minute mark, Fowler made a save but the puck bounced to Fillion, who had a half-open net. He hesitated for a half-second before shooting but in that time the puck rolled off of the toe of his stick and the shot went wide. Quinnipiac took over after the near-miss and combination of speed and physical play to not only prevent the Eagles from getting a good shot on Duplessis but also generate further chances for themselves. Rather than slow the game down, Quinnipiac kept their pace high and force Boston College to try and get through a tight-checking defense without time to think. Seemingly, the best BC was able to do was get a single shot on goal before the Bobcats closed ranks and either cleared the zone or got a stop from their goalie. Quinnipiac's suffocating defense allowed just 3 shots to the Eagles through 14 minutes and even when the Bobcats made a mistake with the puck, fortune had the puck slide away from an Eagle player, or hop over a stick. With under 5 minutes to play, Boston College finally managed to do something with a turnover and Aram Minnetian tied the game with a laser from the high slot. A few minutes later, the BC faithful were up in arms when a trip on Smith went uncalled and Quinnipiac got back to their offensive game. The game sped up even more in the final few minutes but the choppy ice seemed to interfere with several rushes. BC made a furious charge at the end but time ran out before the winning goal could be scored.

At the start of overtime, Boston College had trouble getting out of their own zone. Turnovers, forechecking and icings hemmed the Eagles in their defensive zone for most of the first two minutes and forced Greg Brown to call a timeout to give his team a breather. The Eagles were finally able to break through the Bobcats' defense at around the 4-minute mark and a shot from the point was tipped in on Duplessis. The goaltender lost his balance and was unable to freeze the puck. Cristophe Tellier tried to clear the puck but it went right to the stick of Jack Malone who fired it between the legs of McGee for the winning goal.

=== National semifinal ===
| April 11, 2024; 8:10 pm | (E1) Boston College | 4–0 (1–0, 2–0, 1–0) | (MW3) Michigan | Xcel Energy Center; Attendance: 18,598 |

Game reference

Jacob Fowler
Goalies
Jake Barczewski
Referees:
Ryan Hersey
Nathan Wieler
Linesmen:
Tyler Liffrig
Erik Contino

| (Leonard, Perreault) Will Smith (24) – 1:20 | 1–0 |
| (Perreault, Gustafsson) Will Smith (25) – 32:25 | 2–0 |
| (unassisted) Cutter Gauthier (38) – 33:14 | 3–0 |
| (unassisted) Gabe Perreault (19) – 45:03 | 4–0 |

8 min
Penalties
6 min
22
Shots
32

Game summary
Michigan started the game on the attack, getting several opportunities in the first minute plus. When Boston College counterattacked, Will Smith scored on the Eagle's first shot of the game over a sprawling Jake Barczewski from in tight. The goal didn't give Michigan any pause and the Wolverines got right back on the attack. Jacob Fowler had to stay dialed in and stop several good chances while the Maize and Blue searched for the equalizer. Near the middle of the period Smith nearly pulled off a miraculous move by dancing through the Wolverine defense but he lost the puck before he could get a shot on goal. A few minutes later, Mark Estapa hit Eamon Powell late and was given a minor penalty. BC got a good look early on the man-advantage but it lasted just 35 seconds before Ryan Leonard took a hooking minor. During the 4-on-4, both teams had chances but the best opportunity came just as the abbreviated Michigan power play was starting when Jake Barczewski flubbed the puck and Smith jumped on the loose rubber. Fortunately for the Wolverines, Smith didn't get much on his shot and Barczewski made the save. about 90 seconds later, Estapa was called for tripping to give the Eagles their third power play of the first period. Boston College had trouble setting up in the offensive zone and Frank Nazar ended up getting the best chance for Michigan. Both teams went on the attack for the final few minutes but a combination of good goaltending and shot blocking prevented the score from changing.

Boston College got off to a fast start in the middle period and, in the second minute, Leonard was nearly able to dance around Barczewski for a goal but the prone Wolverine netminder made the save with his right pad. A few minutes later, Cutter Gauthier received a penalty for interference. The nation's top power play looked to find a way to beat the best penalty kill. Michigan was able to get set up and move the puck but couldn't quite get a grade-A scoring chance. BC got on their horses and charged into the Michigan end afterwards. Oscar Jellvik had a great look at the net from the high slot but Gavin Brindley blocked the shot. The fast pace continued but both teams seemed to be relying more on their defense despite possessing the number two and three offenses in the nation. After the mid-way point of the game, Drew Fortescue mishandled the puck and forced himself into taking a minor penalty. BC's speed on the penalty kill caused Dylan Duke to take a matching tripping call just 24 seconds later to produce a second 4-on-4. Smith got ahold of the puck, wrapped around the goal, and fired a puck to the front of the net where it bounced off of both of Ethan Edwards' feet and into the goal. Less than a minute later, Cutter Gauthier got a breakaway from center ice and fired a shot through Barczewski's legs. BC appeared to relax after building a commanding lead but that seemed to feed into Michigan's game. In the final few minutes, the Wolverines desperately tried to cut into the lead and got several chances on goal but Fowler was equal to the task. Off of a turnover, Leonard nearly scored a fourth goal for the Eagles but the puck sailed through the crease.

In dire need of a goal, Michigan came charging out of the gate in the third and got several good looks on goal. With the Wolverines having to throw caution to the wind, Leonard was able to turn the puck over and get on a breakaway but Barczewski made the save to keep his team alive. The two teams exchanged opportunities in the first four minutes but both goaltenders remained firm. Just past the 5-minute mark, Gabe Perreault grabbed a loose puck, skated into the Michigan end, and wrapped the puck around the net for the fourth BC goal. The air came out of the Michigan balloon for a few minutes afterwards but eventually the Wolverines got back on the attack. Mike Posma made a potentially goal-saving slash near the middle of the period and gave Michigan a chance to finally get on the board with another power play. The Wolverines had their chances but they could not get the puck past Fowler. BC looked content to sit back and play defense for the rest of the game and just bleed the clock down. In the final ten minutes, the urgency seemed to have come out of Michigan's game. Even though they were still trying to score, the team was well aware that it would take a miracle for them to get back into the match. As time ticked away and Michigan remained goalless both teams accepted that the game was already over and the final few minutes passed without much issue.

=== National Championship ===
| April 13, 2024; 5:00 pm | (E1) Boston College | 0–2 (0–0, 0–2, 0–0) | (NE1) Denver | Xcel Energy Center; Attendance: 18,694 |

| Referees: Joe Carusone; C. J. Hanafin; Linesmen: Ryan Knapp; Patrick Dapuzzo |

Scoring summary
| Period | Team | Goal | Assist(s) | Time | Score |
|---|---|---|---|---|---|
| 1st | no scoring | | | | |
| 2nd | DU | Tristan Broz (17) – GW | Lorenz, Buckberger | 29:42 | 1–0 DU |
| 2nd | DU | Rieger Lorenz (16) | Z. Buium, Behrens | 35:16 | 2–0 DU |
| 3rd | no scoring | | | | |
Penalty summary
| Period | Team | Player | Penalty | Time | PIM |
| 1st | no penalties | | | | |
| 2nd | BC | Mike Posma | Boarding | 24:31 | 2:00 |
| 3rd | DU | McKade Webster | Holding | 41:29 | 2:00 |
| 3rd | DU | Jack Devine | Tripping | 52:06 | 2:00 |

Shots by period
| Team | 1 | 2 | 3 | T |
|---|---|---|---|---|
| Denver | 8 | 13 | 5 | 26 |
| Boston College | 5 | 7 | 23 | 35 |

Goaltenders
| Team | Name | Saves | Goals against | Time on ice |
|---|---|---|---|---|
| DU | Matt Davis | 35 | 0 | 60:00 |
| BC | Jacob Fowler | 24 | 2 | 57:23 |

Game summary
The game began at a modest pace with both teams probing for a weakness. Denver got the first chance when a turnover at center ice led to a 3-on-1 break but Jacob Fowler was in position to make the save. A few minutes later, BC moved the puck into the Denver zone and Cutter Gauthier shot the puck wide. The rubber rebounded behind the net and came out to Andre Gasseau. The Eagle forward had a wide-open net to shoot at but didn't quite have the right angle and his shot hit the post dead-center and stayed out. Denver controlled the puck for much of the early part of the game but BC's defense kept the Pioneers to the outside. The best chance for DU came when a missed pass by Boston College came right to Lucas Ölvestad in front of the net. Fowler slid to the top of the crease and kicked away the backhand attempt. The Eagles then counterattacked and got an odd-man rush into Denver's end and though they weren't able to score they finally got their first shot on goal. The second shot from BC came when Will Smith got a breakaway but Matt Davis was able to close his five hole in time. Denver then replied with a couple of good looks on goal but Folwer and the Boston College defense kept the game scoreless. The two teams continued to test one another and, while several chances were generated, most would not end up with a shot on goal. BC tilted the ice in its favor in the second half and began to apply pressure on the Denver defense. The Pioneers were equal to the test and held off the highly-talented Eagles. Denver ended the period by getting its first shot in over 8 minutes of playing time but the period belonged to the defensive corps.

The second began with Denver on the attack but Fowler remained stout in goal. BC was quick to respond and get chances of their own and Davis had his chance to make a few saves. Nerves appeared to get the better of both teams when a series of made to end multiple attempted rushes. Just before the 5-minute mark, Mike Posma pushed McKade Webster into the end boards from behind and was given a minor for boarding. The injured Webster was taken to the locker room while his teammates tried to solve the best penalty kill in the nation. Denver was able to set up in the BC zone but several stick checks and blocked shots prevented the Pioneers from getting a shot on goal. Just before the mid-way point of the game, Oskar Jellvik found Gasseau wide open in the high slot but could not solve Davis. Gauthier had a chance off the rebound but his shot went wide. Less then a minute later, Tristan Broz fired a shot from the left circle that beat Fowler but not the post. The puck rebounded and hit Fowler in the back then fluttered in the air towards the goal. The BC netminder waved blindly at the puck while two of his teammates tired desperately to knock the biscuit away from the goal but they were just not quick enough and the rubber hopped into the goal. Denver went on the attack afterwards and didn't give the Eagles any chance to even the score. Around the 7-minute mark, a flubbed pass at the Pioneer blueline gave Jared Wright a breakaway but Fowler was able to make the save from in tight. A few minutes later, Zeev Buium made a tremendous pass to Rieger Lorenz in the left circle and the Denver forward fired the puck into the near corner. Now down by a pair, the Eagles went on the attack but Denver's defense stood firm and prevented a high-quality scoring chance. The Pioneers' suffocating defense was on full display in the final minutes of the period and frustrated BC time and again.

Greg Brown changed up the lines for the third period, trying to get some spark of life for the BC offense. The Eagles got a scoring chance early and within 90 seconds, Jacob Bengtsson forced Webster into taking a minor penalty. The #2 power play took on a rather poor PK and the Eagles were able to get a tremendous chance when Gabe Perreault found Ryan Leonard wide open in the low slot. Davis jumped back across the net and somehow managed to get his glove on the shot. BC continued to press after the penalty ended but Denver had pulled back into a defensive shell and did their best to melt down the Eagle rushes. At the 8-minute mark, Smith got open in the high slot and beat Davis with a hard shot, however, the puck clanked off of the right post and bounced away from the goal. With just less than 8 minutes to play, Jack Devine made a mistake on the forecheck and took a tripping penalty. The Eagles turned the man-advantage into a shooting gallery but could not get the puck past Davis. Even though the defense blocked several shots, four grade-A chances made in on goal but BC continued to be frustrated by the junior netminder. As time wound down, Fowler remained in the net despite Boston College having possession in the Denver end. The Eagles didn't pull their goaltender until less there was less than 3 minutes to play and put the Denver goal under constant pressure in the final moments of the match. Denver's defense held and turned aside all attempts to win the 10th National Championship in program history.

== Scoring statistics ==
| Name | Position | Games | Goals | Assists | Points | PIM |
|---|---|---|---|---|---|---|
| Will Smith | C | 41 | 25 | 46 | 71 | 14 |
| Cutter Gauthier | C/LW | 41 | 38 | 27 | 65 | 18 |
| Ryan Leonard | C | 41 | 31 | 29 | 60 | 38 |
| Gabe Perreault | RW | 36 | 19 | 41 | 60 | 29 |
| Oskar Jellvik | C/LW | 41 | 13 | 29 | 42 | 16 |
| Eamon Powell | D | 40 | 5 | 33 | 38 | 8 |
| Andre Gasseau | C | 40 | 12 | 17 | 29 | 27 |
| Jack Malone | C/RW | 41 | 12 | 13 | 25 | 12 |
| Lukas Gustafsson | D | 41 | 3 | 13 | 16 | 22 |
| Aidan Hreschuk | D | 41 | 2 | 13 | 15 | 32 |
| Jacob Bengtsson | D | 40 | 3 | 11 | 14 | 18 |
| Jamie Armstrong | LW | 32 | 5 | 7 | 12 | 17 |
| Aram Minnetian | D | 40 | 3 | 6 | 9 | 29 |
| Mike Posma | C/LW | 41 | 2 | 6 | 8 | 23 |
| Will Vote | RW | 20 | 1 | 7 | 8 | 4 |
| Colby Ambrosio | C | 40 | 2 | 6 | 8 | 10 |
| Drew Fortescue | D | 40 | 4 | 4 | 8 | 36 |
| Charlie Leddy | D | 39 | 0 | 8 | 8 | 12 |
| Connor Joyce | C | 35 | 2 | 4 | 6 | 6 |
| Gentry Shamburger | F | 30 | 1 | 1 | 2 | 8 |
| Jacob Fowler | G | 39 | 0 | 2 | 2 | 0 |
| Jan Korec | G | 4 | 0 | 0 | 0 | 0 |
| Will Traeger | C | 8 | 0 | 0 | 0 | 2 |
| Nolan Joyce | D | 4 | 0 | 0 | 0 | 0 |
| Total | | | 183 | 319 | 502 | 393 |

== Goaltending statistics ==
| Name | Games | Minutes | Wins | Losses | Ties | Goals against | Saves | Shut outs | SV % | GAA |
|---|---|---|---|---|---|---|---|---|---|---|
| Jan Korec | 4 | 136:59 | 2 | 0 | 0 | 4 | 45 | 1 | .918 | 1.75 |
| Jacob Fowler | 39 | 2326:33 | 32 | 6 | 1 | 83 | 1038 | 3 | .926 | 2.14 |
| Empty Net | - | 13:52 | - | - | - | 2 | - | - | - | - |
| Total | 41 | 2477:24 | 34 | 6 | 1 | 89 | 1083 | 4 | .924 | 2.16 |

== Rankings ==
| Poll | Week | | | | | | | | | | | | | | | | | | | | | | | | | | |
| Poll | Pre | 1 | 2 | 3 | 4 | 5 | 6 | 7 | 8 | 9 | 10 | 11 | 12 | 13 | 14 | 15 | 16 | 17 | 18 | 19 | 20 | 21 | 22 | 23 | 24 | 25 | 26 (Final) |
|---|---|---|---|---|---|---|---|---|---|---|---|---|---|---|---|---|---|---|---|---|---|---|---|---|---|---|---|
| USCHO.com | 6 | 4 (2) | 3 (4) | 3 (1) | 1 (36) | 1 (30) | 4 (2) | 2 (6) | 1 (18) | 2т (4) | 1 (34) | – | 1 (34) | 1 (37) | 2 (12) | 2 (6) | 1 (47) | 1 (48) | 1 (24) | 1 (50) | 1 (50) | 1 (50) | 1 (50) | 1 (50) | 1 (50) | – | 2 |
| USA Hockey | 6 | 5 | 3 (1) | 3 | 1 (27) | 1 (25) | 3 (2) | 1т (11) | 1 (18) | 3 (1) | 1 (26) | 1 (28) | – | 1 (28) | 2 (6) | 2 (7) | 1 (34) | 1 (34) | 1 (22) | 1 (34) | 1 (34) | 1 (34) | 1 (34) | 1 (34) | 1 (34) | 1 (34) | 2 |

Note: USCHO did not release a poll in weeks 11 or 25. Note: USA Hockey did not release a poll in week 12.

== Awards and honors ==
| Player | Award | Ref |
|---|---|---|
| Greg Brown | Spencer Penrose Award | |
| Jacob Fowler | AHCA East First Team All-American | |
| Cutter Gauthier | AHCA East First Team All-American | |
| Will Smith | AHCA East First Team All-American | |
| Ryan Leonard | AHCA East Second Team All-American | |
| Gabe Perreault | AHCA East Second Team All-American | |
| Will Smith | NCAA All-Tournament team | |
| Jacob Fowler | Hockey East Goaltending Champion | |
| Eamon Powell | Len Ceglarski Award | |
| Greg Brown | Bob Kullen Coach of the Year Award | |
| Will Smith | William Flynn Tournament Most Valuable Player | |
| Jacob Fowler | Hockey East First Team | |
| Cutter Gauthier | Hockey East First Team | |
| Will Smith | Hockey East First Team | |
| Eamon Powell | Hockey East Second Team | |
| Ryan Leonard | Hockey East Second Team | |
| Gabe Perreault | Hockey East Second Team | |
| Jacob Fowler | Hockey East Rookie Team | |
| Ryan Leonard | Hockey East Rookie Team | |
| Gabe Perreault | Hockey East Rookie Team | |
| Will Smith | Hockey East Rookie Team | |
| Jacob Fowler | Hockey East All-Tournament Team | |
| Eamon Powell | Hockey East All-Tournament Team | |
| Will Smith | Hockey East All-Tournament Team | |
| Gabe Perreault | Hockey East All-Tournament Team | |

== 2024 NHL entry draft ==
| Round | Pick | Player | NHL team |
|---|---|---|---|
| 1 | 25 | Dean Letourneau ^{†} | Boston Bruins |
| 2 | 55 | Teddy Stiga ^{†} | Nashville Predators |
| 2 | 65 | Will Skahan ^{†} | Utah Hockey Club |

† incoming freshman
