= 2024 NCAA Division I men's ice hockey tournament =

- Teams: 16
- Finals site: Xcel Energy Center, Saint Paul, Minnesota
- Champions: Denver Pioneers (10th title)
- Runner-up: Boston College Eagles (12th title game)
- Semifinalists: Boston University Terriers (24th Frozen Four); Michigan Wolverines (28th Frozen Four)
- Winning coach: David Carle (2nd title)
- MOP: Matt Davis (Denver)
- Attendance: 18,694 (Championship); 55,890 (Frozen Four); 116,706 (Tournament)

The 2024 NCAA Division I Men's Ice Hockey Tournament was the national championship tournament for men's college ice hockey in the United States held from March 28 to April 13, 2024. The tournament involved 16 teams in single-elimination play to determine the national champion at the Division I level of the National Collegiate Athletic Association (NCAA), the highest level of competition in college hockey. The tournament's Frozen Four—the semifinals and finals—were hosted by the University of Minnesota at the Xcel Energy Center in St. Paul, Minnesota.

Denver defeated Boston College 2-0 to win the national championship, becoming the first program to win 10 NCAA titles.

The 2024 Frozen Four was the first Frozen Four held in the state of Minnesota without a team from Minnesota since 1991. It was also the first Frozen Four held in Minnesota to not have the national champion be from Minnesota since 1994.

== Tournament procedure ==
2024 Regionals (blue) and Frozen Four (red)

The tournament is composed of four groups of four teams in regional brackets. The four regionals are named after their geographic areas. The following were the sites for the 2024 regionals:

Regional semifinals and finals

- March 28 & 30

Northeast Regional, MassMutual Center – Springfield, Massachusetts (Hosts: University of Massachusetts, Amherst, American International College and Western MA Sports Commission)
West Regional, Denny Sanford Premier Center – Sioux Falls, South Dakota (Hosts: University of Nebraska Omaha and Sioux Falls Sports Authority)

- March 29 & 31

East Regional, Amica Mutual Pavilion – Providence, Rhode Island (Host: Brown University)
Midwest Regional, Centene Community Ice Center – Maryland Heights, Missouri (Hosts: Lindenwood University and St. Louis Sports Commission)

National semifinals and championship (Frozen Four and championship)

- April 11 & 13

Xcel Energy Center – Saint Paul, Minnesota (Host: University of Minnesota)

== Qualifying teams ==
The at-large bids and seeding for each team in the tournament were announced on March 24, 2024, on ESPNU at 6:30 pm ET.

The Big Ten, Hockey East and NCHC each received four bids to the tournament. ECAC received two while Atlantic Hockey and the CCHA both received one berth.

East Regional – Providence							Northeast Regional – Springfield						
Seed	School	Conference	Record	Berth type	Appearance	Last bid	Seed	School	Conference	Record	Berth type	Appearance	Last bid
1	Boston College (1)	Hockey East	31–5–1	Tournament champion	37th	2021	1	Denver (3)	NCHC	28–9–3	Tournament champion	31st	2023
2	Wisconsin (8)	Big Ten	26–11–2	At-large bid	27th	2021	2	Maine (5)	Hockey East	23–11–2	At-large bid	19th	2012
3	Quinnipiac (9)	ECAC	26–9–2	At-large bid	10th	2023	3	Cornell (12)	ECAC	21–6–6	Tournament champion	24th	2023
4	Michigan Tech (16)	CCHA	19–14–6	Tournament champion	16th	2023	4	Massachusetts (14)	Hockey East	20–13–3	At-large bid	5th	2022
Midwest Regional – Maryland Heights							West Regional – Sioux Falls						
Seed	School	Conference	Record	Berth type	Appearance	Last bid	Seed	School	Conference	Record	Berth type	Appearance	Last bid
1	Michigan State (4)	Big Ten	24–9–3	Tournament champion	28th	2012	1	Boston University (2)	Hockey East	26–9–2	At-large bid	39th	2023
2	North Dakota (6)	NCHC	26–11–2	At-large bid	35th	2022	2	Minnesota (7)	Big Ten	22–10–5	At-large bid	41st	2023
3	Michigan (10)	Big Ten	21–14–3	At-large bid	41st	2023	3	Omaha (11)	NCHC	24–13–4	At-large bid	5th	2021
4	Western Michigan (13)	NCHC	21–15–1	At-large bid	9th	2023	4	RIT (15)	Atlantic Hockey	27–10–2	Tournament champion	4th	2016

Number in parentheses denotes overall seed in the tournament.

== Bracket ==
Regional Semifinals; March 28–29
1	Boston College (1)	6
4	Michigan Tech	1
East – Providence – Fri/Sun
2	Wisconsin	2
3	Quinnipiac	3*
1	Michigan State (4)	5*
4	Western Michigan	4
Midwest – Maryland Heights – Fri/Sun
2	North Dakota	3
3	Michigan	4
1	Boston University (2)	6
4	RIT	3
West – Sioux Falls – Thu/Sat
2	Minnesota	3
3	Omaha	2
1	Denver (3)	2**
4	Massachusetts	1
Northeast – Springfield – Thu/Sat
2	Maine	1
3	Cornell	3

Regional Finals; March 30–31
1	Boston College	5*
3	Quinnipiac	4
1	Michigan State	2
3	Michigan	5
1	Boston University	6
2	Minnesota	3
1	Denver	2
3	Cornell	1

National Semifinals; Thursday, April 11
E1	Boston College	4
MW3	Michigan	0
W1	Boston University	1
NE1	Denver	2*

National Championship; Saturday, April 13
E1	Boston College	0
NE1	Denver	2

Number in parentheses denotes overall seed in the tournament.
* denotes overtime period

== Results ==
Note: All game times are local.

=== East Region – Providence, Rhode Island ===
==== Regional semifinals ====
March 29, 2024; 2:00 pm	(1) Boston College	6–1 (1–1, 1–0, 4–0)	(4) Michigan Tech	Amica Mutual Pavilion; Attendance: 6,988

Game reference

Jacob Fowler
Goalies
Blake Pietila
Referees:
Ryan Hersey
Nathan Wieler
Linesmen:
Tyler Liffrig
Erik Contino

(Jellvik, Powell) Cutter Gauthier (36) – 0:36	1–0
	1–1	12:55 – SH – Max Koskipirtti (4) (unassisted)
(Malone, Hreschuk) Ryan Leonard (28) – GW – 26:57	2–1
(Malone, Powell) Connor Joyce (12) – 44:47	3–1
(Smith, Leonard) Oskar Jellvik (13) – 45:35	4–1
(Gauthier, Powell) Ryan Leonard (29) – PP – 47:58	5–1
(Jellvik, Leonard) Cutter Gauthier (37) – PP – 51:25	6–1

21 min
Penalties
31 min
38
Shots
24

Game summary
The game began with the teams exchanging rushes up the ice. After Tech lost control of the puck in front of the Eagle's net, Oskar Jellvik skated up the ice and passed the puck to Cutter Gauthier, who had gotten behind the Huskies defense on a partial break away. The nation's leading goal scorer fired the puck between Blake Pietila's legs for the opening goal. BC kept the pressure on and got several more scoring chances afterwards but Pietila had settled down and kept Tech in the game. The Huskies weren't able to establish any extended zone time until about the 8-minute mark but even then BC's speed kept Tech to the outside. About a minute later, a BC turnover in their own end resulted in two glorious scoring chances for Tech but the pipe helped to keep the puck out of the goal. As Tech started warming to the task, they got another chance after the Eagles iced the puck; MTU won the ensuing faceoff and crashed in on Jacob Fowler. The puck ended up getting past the BC goalie but bounced just to the side of the cage. Michigan Tech continued to circle and got another scoring chance a few second later but the Jack Malone blocked the shot. A further chance went wide and the puck ended up coming to Colby Ambrosio who charged down the ice on a break away. Chase Pietila managed to just catch him from behind and hook Ambrosio as he was shooting to eliminate the scoring chance. Rather than awarding Ambrosio a penalty shot, the referees handed Pietila a minor penalty. half-way through the kill, BC turned over the puck at center ice and Tech broke towards Fowler on a 2-on-0. Max Koskipirtti kept the puck and, right when he got to the faceoff dot, he fired a shot right over Fowler's glove for Tech's second short-handed goal on the season. The Huskies captured the momentum afterwards and began generating scoring opportunities in the BC zone. Now it was Fowler's turn to hold the fort and the young netminder matched Pietila save-for-save. Towards the end of the period BC regained its footing and play evened out the score remained tied at the buzzer.

Both teams picked up in the second right where they left off and got on the attack. BC turned the puck over several times in the first two minutes, giving Tech multiple scoring chances. The best went to Kash Rasmussen who found himself completely alone in front of the BC net but his shot went wide. A few seconds later, a loose puck bounced right to Koskipirtti for shot from the slot but Fowler got in the way. Eventually, the Eagles began to calm down and get into the offensive zone around the 5th minute. Jellvik got a solid scoring chance but his shot was deflected off the post by Blake Pietila. The Eagles continued to press and Ryan Leonard rushed the puck up the ice. Pietila stopped his initial shot, as well as the rebound from Aidan Hreschuk. Jack Malone found the loose puck and shuffled it over to an open Leonard who fired into a half-open cage for BC's second lead of the night. Play tilted towards Boston College afterwards but the Eagles continued to make sloppy plays and turn the puck over in dangerous areas. Tech got a few good looks at the net but the puck refused to cooperate and several chanced went by the wayside. Right off of a faceoff, Leonard broke in on Pietila and nearly tucked the puck into the goal but the Tech defense was able to turn him aside without taking a penalty. Scant second later, Gabe Perreault hit Tyrone Bronte in the head and received a match penalty. Boston College needed their #1 penalty kill to come through and it did. Michigan Tech got a few chances on Fowler, much of their time was spent trying to set up in the offensive zone and the Huskies were unable to convert on the man-advantage. BC was able to carry their narrow lead to the end of the period but they would have to finish the game missing one of their top scorers.

Michigan Tech started the third by joining BC in bad habits and committed two bad turnovers that led to chances for the Eagles. Pietila managed to keep the puck out of the net and the disjointed play continued for both sides. Eventually, BC was able to set up in the offensive zone and Connor Joyce got lost behind the net. When he popped out in front, Jack Malone found him for an easy tap in goal. Less than a minute later, BC cleared the puck into the Tech end. When Blake Pietila went behind the goal to gain possession, the rubber hit the referee in the backside and deflected into the net. However, the rule (83.6) stipulated that a goal cannot be scored due to direct interference from the officials so the goal was waved off. The reprieve for Tech didn't last long and just a minute later Will Smith got the puck to Jellvik on a break away and he put BC up by three. After the succeeding faceoff, Ryland Mosley took a run at Ryan Leonard at center ice and a melee broke out. Mosley received a match penalty while all other infractions cancelled out. A minute into the power play, Ryan Leonard netted his second goal off of a rush and the route was on. Gauthier ended the power play with his second of the game after a drop-pass in the slot from Jellvik. BC continued to press afterwards, looking for another goal, but the intensity was muted. Both teams played like they knew the game was over and soon enough it was.

March 29, 2024; 5:30 pm	(2) Wisconsin	2–3 (OT) (0–1, 2–1, 0–0, 0–1)	(3) Quinnipiac	Amica Mutual Pavilion; Attendance: 6,988

Game reference

Kyle McClellan
Goalies
Vinny Duplessis
Referees:
Brandon Schmitt
Nicholas Krebsbach
Linesmen:
Dana Penkivech
Jeff Schultz

	0–1	2:12 – Christophe Fillion (11) (Tellier, Tupker)
(unassisted) Quinn Finley (10) – 21:46	1–1
(Dexheimer, Mehlenbacher) Joe Palodichuk (3) – 23:01	2–1
	2–2	38:28 – Victor Czerneckianair (6) (Tupker, Cipollone)
	2–3	71:04 – GW – Victor Czerneckianair (7) (Treloar, Pennington)

8 min
Penalties
2 min
20
Shots
32

Game summary

==== Regional final ====
March 31, 2024; 4:00 pm	(1) Boston College	5–4 (OT) (0–0, 3–3, 1–1, 1–0)	(3) Quinnipiac	Amica Mutual Pavilion; Attendance: 5,835

Game reference

Jacob Fowler
Goalies
Vinny Duplessis
Referees:
Brandon Schmitt
Nicholas Krebsbach
Linesmen:
Dana Penkivech
Jeff Schultz

	0–1	21:19 – PP – Jacob Quillan (16) (Treloar, Lee)
	0–2	21:54 – Iivari Räsänen (4) (unassisted)
(Gauthier, Powell) Ryan Leonard (30) – PP – 22:20	1–2
(Jellvik, Gustafsson) Andre Gasseau (12) – 31:35	2–2
	2–3	35:59 – Christophe Fillion (12) (Legault, Räsänen)
(Smith, Powell) Ryan Leonard (31) – 37:55	3–3
	3–4	40:18 – PP – Jacob Quillan (17) (Graf, Legault)
(Gauthier, Jellvik) Aram Minnetian (3) – 55:16	4–4
(unassisted) Jack Malone (12) – GW – 63:06	5–4

8 min
Penalties
10 min
32
Shots
30

Game summary
Both teams started the game quickly, alternating rushes up the ice. The first good scoring chance went to BC's Ryan Leonard who skated through the Bobcat defense and got the puck behind Vinny Duplessis after following up his rebound. Fortunately for Quinnipiac, their defense was first on the loose puck and cleared it out of the zone. Neither team was particularly sound with the puck with both committing turnovers. The Eagles began to get the offense going in the middle part of the first but Quinnipiac's defense was quick to respond. During one of the counter rushes towards the BC net, Gabe Perreault hooked an otherwise wide-open Christophe Fillion and gave the bobcats the first power play of the game. Quinnipiac set up in the Boston College zone and fired a barrage of shots on goal. Jacob Fowler and the defense managed to turn aside several good shots and melt down a handful of other potential chances. Aram Minnetian got control of the puck right when Perreault was coming out of the box and got the winger on a breakaway. Perreault ended up getting three shots on goal from right in front of the next but Duplessis stood strong and stopped the all. During the play that followed, Zach Tupker was called for a minor penalty in front of the BC net to give the Eagles a chance with the man-advantage. Within 30 seconds, Cutter Gauthier was set up with a glorious redirect in front but Duplessis made a highlight-reel save with his left pad. Boston College continued to press and got a few more good chances until Jack Malone knocked a rebound into the net. The referee immediately waved off the goal for being hit with a high stick and the call stood after a review. The Eagles kept their foot on the gas and put a great deal of pressure on the Bobcat defense and ended up forcing C. J. McGee into a hooking penalty. The nation's #2 power play had trouble getting set up in the Quinnipiac zone thanks to solid checking. Near the end of the power play and period, Will Smith cross-checked Victor Czerneckianair and was handed a minor penalty.

Quinnipiac got set up on their power play as soon as play resumed and they remained in the BC end for well over a minute. Just before the end of the man-advantage, a tip from Jacob Quillan found its way between Fowler's legs for the opening goal. Just 35 second later, a shot from Iivari Räsänen along the high wall got past a screened Fowler and Quinnipiac suddenly had a 2-goal lead. On the ensuing play, Czerneckianair was whistled for high-sticking and it took just 8 seconds for Gauthier to set up Leonard for the Eagles' first goal. Even with the BC power play, the first half of the second was largely played in the BC end but, as time wore on, the Eagles began to get to their offensive game. Just before the mid-way point of the match, Jayden Lee took a slashing penalty and gave Boston College yet another chance on the power play. The Bobcats kept BC to the outside and managed to stave off a repeat but just after Lee had exited the box, Andre Gasseau fired the puck from the top of the left circle past a partially screened Duplessis to tie the game. A few minutes later, during a broken play in the Bobcats' end, BC flubbed a scoring chance and Smith committed a hooking penalty as Quinnipiac started back up the ice. Quinnipiac found it far tougher to set up in the offensive zone on their second man-advantage and the Boston College kept the game tied. Immediately after the end of the power play, BC tried to find Smith for a breakaway but they were called for icing. On the ensuing faceoff, Fillion was able to find a loose puck right in front of the goal, kick it to his stick and fire it past Fowler in one motion. A few minutes later, as BC was moving the puck up the ice, Collin Graf was given a minor for interference on a fairly controversial play. It took a minute for Leonard to get the puck behind the Bobcat cage and wrap it around for his second goal of the game. Just seconds later, Drew Fortescue was given a questionable penalty on what was considered a makeup call by the broadcast analyst. Quinnipiac get set up in the offensive zone and remained their most of the power play but they could not find any clear lanes to the net and didn't get a shot on goal for almost a minute. BC was able to hold on and make it to the buzzer without allowing a further goal.

With just 18 second left in their man-advantage, Quinnipiac quickly got into the BC zone and got the puck to Graf at the right point. He fired a shot that missed the net but bounced out the other side right to Quillan, who fired it from a very sharp angle into the net. The Eagles tried to get back to their game afterwards but several possessions were cancelled out by turnovers or solid defensive play from the Bobcats. After a few minutes, Boston College settled down and began applying pressure on Duplessis. On a counterattack at the 5-minute mark, Fowler made a save but the puck bounced to Fillion, who had a half-open net. He hesitated for a half-second before shooting but in that time the puck rolled off of the toe of his stick and the shot went wide. Quinnipiac took over after the near-miss and combination of speed and physical play to not only prevent the Eagles from getting a good shot on Duplessis but also generate further chances for themselves. Rather than slow the game down, Quinnipiac kept their pace high and force Boston College to try and get through a tight-checking defense without time to think. Seemingly, the best BC was able to do was get a single shot on goal before the Bobcats closed ranks and either cleared the zone or got a stop from their goalie. Quinnipiac's suffocating defense allowed just 3 shots to the Eagles through 14 minutes and even when the Bobcats made a mistake with the puck, fortune had the puck slide away from an Eagle player, or hop over a stick. With under 5 minutes to play, Boston College finally managed to do something with a turnover and Aram Minnetian tied the game with a laser from the high slot. A few minutes later, the BC faithful were up in arms when a trip on Smith went uncalled and Quinnipiac got back to their offensive game. The game sped up even more in the final few minutes but the choppy ice seemed to interfere with several rushes. BC made a furious charge at the end but time ran out before the winning goal could be scored.

At the start of overtime, Boston College had trouble getting out of their own zone. Turnovers, forechecking and icings hemmed the Eagles in their defensive zone for most of the first two minutes and forced Greg Brown to call a timeout to give his team a breather. The Eagles were finally able to break through the Bobcats' defense at around the 4-minute mark and a shot from the point was tipped in on Duplessis. The goaltender lost his balance and was unable to freeze the puck. Cristophe Tellier tried to clear the puck but it went right to the stick of Jack Malone who fired it between the legs of McGee for the winning goal.

=== West Region – Sioux Falls, South Dakota ===
==== Regional semifinals ====
March 28, 2024; 4:00 pm	(1) Boston University	6–3 (2–1, 2–1, 2–1)	(4) RIT	Denny Sanford Premier Center; Attendance: 5,691

Game reference

Mathieu Caron
Goalies
Tommy Scarfone
Referees:
Bruce Vida
Brady Johnson
Linesmen:
Tyler Landman
Nathan Voll

(M. Celebrini, Kaplan) Lane Hutson (14) – 11:56	1–0
(unassisted) Ryan Greene (12) – 13:01	2–0
	2–1	15:40 – PP – Elijah Gonsalves (20) (Wilde, Cassaro)
(L. Hutson, Kaplan) Sam Stevens (9) – 28:16	3–1
	3–2	35:20 – Gianfranco Cassaro (18) (Nicholson)
(Peterson, Zabaneh) Macklin Celebrini (32) – GW – 37:01	4–2
(Lachance, Willander) Jack Harvey (6) – 41:29	5–2
(Willander, Zabaneh) Dylan Peterson (8) – EN – 55:46	6–2
	6–3	59:03 – Cody Laskosky (4) (Catalano, Blom)

6 min
Penalties
6 min
33
Shots
31

Game summary

March 28, 2024; 7:30 pm	(2) Minnesota	3–2 (0–0, 1–1, 2–1)	(3) Omaha	Denny Sanford Premier Center; Attendance: 5,691

Game reference

Justen Close
Goalies
Simon Latkoczy
Referees:
Jeremy Tufts
Terrence Murphy
Linesmen:
Steven Murray
Jeff McCorkle

	0–1	21:51 – PP – Joaquim Lemay (5) (Guévin, Bremer)
(Kurth) Jimmy Clark (5) – 38:01	1–1
	1–2	44:28 – Ty Mueller (4) (Randl, Lemay)
(Brodzinski) Jaxon Nelson (17) – 49:15	2–2
(Brodzinski) Jaxon Nelson (18) – GW – 55:47	3–2

9 min
Penalties
4 min
39
Shots
36

Game summary

==== Regional final ====
March 30, 2024; 5:30 pm	(1) Boston University	6–3 (1–2, 3–1, 2–0)	(2) Minnesota	Denny Sanford Premier Center; Attendance: 6,113

Game reference

Mathieu Caron
Goalies
Justen Close
Referees:
Cameron Lynch
Jason Williams
Linesmen:
Steve Drain
John Rey

	0–1	7:19 – Jaxon Nelson (19) (Brodzinski, Rinzel)
	0–2	17:47 – Bryce Brodzinski (14) (Pitlick)
(unassisted) Quinn Hutson (18) – 18:01	1–2
(M. Celebrini, Harvey) Shane Lachance (13) – 21:17	2–2
(M. Celebrini, Lachance) Jack Harvey (7) – 25:25	3–2
	3–3	29:20 – Aaron Huglen (14) (Lamb, L. Mittelstadt)
(Peterson, C. McCarthy) Lane Hutson (15) – GW – 35:36	4–3
(Willander) Case McCarthy (4) – EN – 58:15	5–3
(M. Celebrini) Sam Stevens (10) – EN – 59:28	6–3

0 min
Penalties
0 min
38
Shots
28

Game summary
Boston University began the game on offense, getting several shots on Justen Close in the first few minutes. Minnesota's defense kept the Terriers from getting a great chance for a goal and then started matching BU's effort level. After several near-misses, the Gophers finally got their first shot just before the 5-minute mark. Shortly afterwards, Boston University set up for an extended period in the offensive zone and had several scoring chances but Close kept the game scoreless. Minnesota responded with an attack of their own and Jaxon Nelson twisted his body to fire a sharp-angle shot into the far corner of the goal for the opening score. The pace slowed down afterwards and little occurred over the next several minutes. Coming out of the TV timeout, Minnesota won a defensive zone faceoff and moved the puck up the ice. BU was first on the rubber but they turned the puck over and the Gophers got two great shots on goal. A minute later, the Terriers got their own high-percentage shot after a turnover but Sam Stevens could not get the puck into the goal. The near-miss appeared to reawaken Boston University and the Terriers got back to the same pace they had at the start of the period. The Gopher defense soon recovered and shut down a pair of Terrier rushes. Near the end of the period, Aaron Huglen forced Case McCarthy into a turnover along the wall. The puck was quickly moved to Bryce Brodzinski who shot the puck past Mathieu Caron's glove. After the ensuing faceoff, Quinn Hutson brought puck up the right side into the Minnesota zone and directed the puck towards the Gopher cage. The slow-motion puck seemed to catch Close off-guard and somehow slipped beneath the netminder's pad and was directed into the goal. The Gophers attacked after the fluky goal and were nearly able to regain their 2-goal edge but Caron made several saves to keep his team within one.

After the start of the second, BU wasted little time in getting to the offense. Macklin Celebrini grabbed the puck at the Minnesota blueline and skated to the right faceoff circle. He wheeled around a found a wide-open Shane Lachance at the left circle for a one-timer. Meanwhile, a Minnesota player ended up sliding into Justen Close and prevented the goaltender from getting into position. This allowed the shot from Lachance to easily sail into the net for the tying goal. The Terriers kept the pressure on and, four minutes later, Celebrini made another pass from the right side of the Gopher cage that ended up in the back of the net, this time to Jack Harvey. BU completely dominated the first seven minutes of the period but Minnesota finally got back into the game in the middle of the period. During an extended stay in the Terriers' end, Caron was forced to made several grade-A saves. The Gophers were able to make a line change and keep the pressure until a shot from Brody Lamb from the right circle. After sliding to his left, Caron was out of the crease as the puck settled in the blue paint. Aaron Huglen found the biscuit at his feet and was able to slap it into the net. In the second half of the period, Jaxon Nelson got a clean break in on the BU cage. While Caron made the save, the puck stayed with Minnesota and the Terrier netminder was forced to make several more stops. BU slowly got back to their game afterwards and continued the see-saw nature of the game. With less than five minutes in the period, Lane Hutson got the puck inside the Minnesota blueline and, after evading a Minnesota defender, skated in an arc down the left side and fired the puck towards the goal. He was apparently trying to find Sam Stevens, who was set up in the goal crease, but the puck hit Close in the left pad and was redirected into the goal. Minnesota took over in the waning minutes and got a good chance on goal but Caron made the save.

Minnesota took the initiative at the start of the third and Nelson had a chance to tie the score just 30 seconds in. BU evened out play afterwards and the two teams exchanged scoring chances. Neither team was able to establish a presence in the offensive zone for any length of time, however, and both teams were limited to end-to-end rushes. The Terriers finally got set up near the middle of the period but the Gopher defense kept them mostly to the outside. Minnesota counterattacked and got a few chances of their own but they too were checked closely by Boston University. In the later half of the period, Macklin Celebrini made a third miraculous pass from the right side but this time the shot was stopped by Close. As the play continued, the puck came back to Celebrini but the teenager caught an edge and Minnesota broke up the ice on a 2-on-1. Nelson passed the puck to Ryan Chesley but he fanned on the shot. About a minute later, Hughes got the puck near the Minnesota goal line and had a partially open net to shoot at but he couldn't overcome the steep angle. Both teams remained on an offensive footing and scoring chances were coming from all quarters. After BU iced the puck with about 2 two minutes to play, Close was pulled for an extra attacker. Minnesota could not get set up in the offensive zone and after their second attempt, Case McCarthy cleared the puck 200 feet into the Minnesota cage for a 2-goal lead. With no other option, Close was pulled again and minute later, Macklin Celebrini chipped the puck out of the zone to Sam Stevens and the second empty-net goal sealed the win for BU.

=== Northeast Region – Springfield, Massachusetts ===
==== Regional semifinals ====
March 28, 2024; 2:00 pm	(1) Denver	2–1 (2OT) (0–0, 1–1, 0–0, 0–0, 1–0)	(4) Massachusetts	MassMutual Center; Attendance: 3,894

Game reference

Matt Davis
Goalies
Michael Hrabal
Referees:
Tony Czech
Jonathon Sitarski
Linesmen:
Justin Cornell
Pat Richardson

(Lemyre, Caponi) Boston Buckberger (9) – 25:12	1–0
	1–1	32:52 – Liam Gorman (1) (Murray, Vanroboys)
(Buckberger, Devine) Tristan Broz (15) – GW – 92:28	2–1

4 min
Penalties
4 min
43
Shots
47

Game summary
Both teams looked ready to play at the start. Denver was skating fast while Massachusetts played a more physical game, though the Pioneers didn't back down. Near the middle of the period, an odd bounce off of the end boards popped right out in front of the Denver cage to a streaking Michael Cameron. The Minuteman was unable to settle the bouncing puck and was forced to rush a close shot on Matt Davis. While the goalie stopped the relatively easy shot, the player lost his edge and slid into the netminder but the puck stayed out. Afterwards, the play began tilting in favor of Massachusetts thank to their forechecking and solid defensive play. Denver avoided another disaster when McKade Webster hit Zeev Buium with a clearing attempt. The puck rebounded towards the Denver cage but Davis was aware enough to stop the puck as it was rolling towards his feet. Denver was able to refocus after a TV timeout and play evened out for the final third of the period. Both teams got scoring chances in the final five minutes but the puck refused to cooperate and the game remained scoreless. With about two minutes left, Taylor Makar and Sean Behrens got into a battle behind the goal. Makar grabbed the Pioneer player as both fell down but the referees made no call. On the ensuing faceoff, Liam Gorman was called for a boarding minor and gave the nation's #16 power play a chance to score. UMass managed to kill off the rest of the period with a man down. Just before the final buzzer, the clock was stopped erroneously when the Minutemen cleared the puck into Denver's end of the ice. Rather than try to determine of there was any time remaining on the clock, the officials announced that the period was over. Because the faceoff would have been held at center ice with less than three seconds, neither team had any issue with the decision.

Denver continued to increase its offensive pressure in the second period and starting taking control of the game. Just past the 5-minute mark, a high cycle play ended up causing Michael Hrabal to get screened by both teams. With the goalie unable to see the puck, Boston Buckberger fired the puck from the top of the circle into the far corner for the first goal of the game. UMass resumed its physical play in the wake of the opening goal and tried to establish some zone time. While the Minutemen did get some scoring chances, Denver counterpunched and got several more chances of their own. The Minutemen continued to lay the body and eventually forced Denver into a turnover behind their own net with about seven minutes left in the period. The 4th-line for UMass threw the puck in front of the net for an attempt from Lucas Vanroboys but his shot was stopped by Davis. Davis also stopped the next shot off of the rebound but the puck then bounced to Liam Gormam. By then, Davis was sprawled out on his back and unable to stop the backhand, allowing Gorman to tie the game with his first of the season. Massachusetts seemed inspired by the goal and redoubled their efforts over the next several minutes. Davis came under siege by the UMass offense but he was able to weather the storm and keep the match tied. Vanroboys got a further chance with about 2 minutes to play but he was taken down on his way to the cage. Once more, the referees decided against calling a penalty, however, as Vanroboys' stick hit a Denver player in the head both could have ended up receiving minor penalties.

When play resumed in the third period, the style remained the same. UMass continued to attack Denver whenever the Pioneers got the puck and gave the favorites no room to maneuver. When Denver did get a scoring chance, their shots either went wide or were blocked before getting to the UMass net. Despite their failures to score, the pressure did eventually cause the Minutemen to make a mistake. Near the middle of the period, Behrens managed to get behind the Massachusetts defense and forced Linden Alger to take a hooking penalty. Denver wasn't able to get set up in the offensive zone but still had a few good looks at the net. With about 7 minutes to play, a mistake inside the UMass blue line by Aidan Thompson caused him to lose control of the puck. He then grabbed the Minuteman to prevent an odd-man rush and was called for interference. Near the end of the man-advantage, Cole O'Hara had a glorious opportunity for a one-timer but he wasn't able to get good wood on the puck and Davis made a relatively easy save. After the penalty expired, Massachusetts continued to carry the play and has several more scoring chances, but Davis stood his ground. In the final few minutes, Denver began to ratchet up their offense once more but the UMass defense was equal to the task.

Both teams began overtime by trying to score quick. End-to-end rushes by both sides were unable to break the tie. After a pair of near-misses by Denver, one from the doorstep by Jack Devine, UMass began generating some zone time of their own and the game continued to see-saw back and forth in the first 5 minutes. The mostly even battle persisted but Devine ended up getting a second chance to end the game when he wrapped the puck around the cage at the 8-minute mark. Unfortunately for Denver, his shot hit the side of the cage and stayed out. About a minute later, Scott Morrow nearly ended the game when Davis wasn't able to pick up his shot but the puck hit Davis in the shoulder and bounced wide. The play started to slow down in the middle part of the period as both teams were becoming tired. Ryan Lautenbach nearly got a chance to end the game with less than 7 minutes to play but the puck was deflected away at the last moment by Tristan Lemyre. Shortly thereafter, Devine got a third scoring chance in overtime after a missed clearing attempt but his shot was stopped by Hrabal's pad. A few minutes later it was Cam O'Neill's turn to get a scoring opportunity from the high slot but Davis was equally unbeatable. With less than 90 seconds to play, Davis missed the puck as it rolled behind the net. UMass knocked it out in front of the net for an open Lucas Mercuri but the puck jumped over his stick and the Minutemen missed an open cage.

The second overtime period began in a similar fashion, with scoring chances being generated by both teams, however, Denver's structure of was beginning to break down. UMass took advantage and got a few good looks at the cage in the third minute but Davis remained stout. Off of a faceoff in the UMass end, Sam Harris took a tripping call and gave UMass a second power play. Massachusetts won the ensuing faceoff and quickly got the puck on goal. While Davis made the save, he was felled by an apparent groin injury (though it turned out to just be cramps). After a medical stoppage, Davis remained in goal and tried to play through the pain. UMass got a few more changes on goal but Denver kept the Minutemen at bay. Right at the end of the penalty, Lautenbach got on a short-handed break but missed the net with his shot. After the penalty expired play evened out and both teams found enough energy to get several scoring chances. Hrabal's right pad continued to be save the game for UMass and allow his team to try and pull off the upset. Massachusetts held the balance of play in the middle of the period but Denver was able to set up in the offensive zone with less than eight minutes left. The puck was wrapped around behind the goal and came out to Tristan Broz in the high slot. He fired a shot into the top corner of the net for the apparent winning goal but the play was reviewed for goaltender interference. Sam Harris had made contact with Hrabal but the referees rules that he had been pushed into the crease by Aaron Bohlinger so the goal stood and Denver advanced.

March 28, 2024; 6:59 pm	(2) Maine	1–3 (1–1, 0–1, 0–1)	(3) Cornell	MassMutual Center; Attendance: 5,765

Game reference

Victor Östman
Goalies
Ian Shane
Referees:
Colin Kronforst
Andrew Bruggeman
Linesmen:
Sam Shikowsky
Tommy George

(Villeneuve-Houle) Harrison Scott (15) – 5:43	1–0
	1–1	13:56 – Kyle Penney (10) (Seger)
	1–2	32:09 – GW – Sullivan Mack (6) (unassisted)
	1–3	50:31 – Sullivan Mack (7) (unassisted)

2 min
Penalties
5 min
32
Shots
18

Game summary
The start to the game was delayed by an hour and a half due to the other semifinal going into overtime. Once the match began, however, Maine jumped on the puck and attacked the Cornell cage. Ian Shane was able to hold off the Black Bears and The Big Red's staunch defense swiftly came to his aid. Play evened out afterwards and Cornell began to test the Maine goaltender. On a missed chance by the Big Red, the puck was quickly moved up the ice by the Bears. When the Cornell defender blew a tire, Harrison Scott was able to skate to an open spot in the slot and fire the puck over Shane's glove. A few minutes later, Ryan Walsh left his feet when he went to check Bradly Nadeau along the half wall and was given a major penalty. Maine used the time well, keeping the pressure on the Cornell net for most of the 5 minutes but they were unable to build on their lead. After killing off the penalty, Cornell got back to its game and began to pressure Maine on the forecheck. Gabriel Seger was able to steal the puck in the offensive zone and sent the rubber to an open Kyle Penney. Penney walked in a fired the shot from the high slot, beating Östman in the top corner. Maine carried the balance of play for the remainder of the period but were stymied by the Cornell defense.

Both teams were skating at the start of the second and ended up exchanging odd-man rushes. As the period wore on, Maine began to take control of the game but on one of the few established zone times for Cornell, Parker Lindauer was whistled for holding and gave the Big Red their first power play of the night. After wasting the first half of the man-advantage, Cornell got two glorious opportunities from the left side of the net but missed the cage both times. Jonathan Castagna then one-timed a laser from the right side but Östman made a brilliant save to keep the game tied. The two then spent several minutes probing for the next goal and, just past the 12-minute mark, Sullivan Mack intercepted the puck on an attempted clear, skated towards the goal and just before a Maine player got within reach, fired the puck past Östman's blocker for Cornell's first lead of the evening. The Big Red carried the momentum for several minutes afterwards but Maine eventually evened out the play. With about 2 minutes to play, George Fegaras attempted to clear the puck but sent it right to a Maine player at his own blue line. Ben Poisson fired the puck on goal and in the ensuing scramble, Sully Scholle ended up skewing Shane's arm when he went for the puck. After a stoppage to check on Shane's health, the goalie remained in the net. Cornell's defense was called upon once more at the end of the period and Maine's offense was held at bay.

Cornell got to its game as soon as the third began and did its best to strangle the Maine offense. The Big Red kept the puck in the Bears' end as much as they could, generating scoring chances when they could, but doing so primarily to prevent any shots from being directed at their own cage. Maine wasn't able to get much going until about five minutes into the period but even then Shane was equal to the task. Maine continued to attack but very few of their chances ended up getting on goal. Just after the midway point of the game, Sullivan Mack deflected the puck away from Bradly Nadeau in front of his own net and broke out on an odd-man rush. He skated towards the Maine goal and, just as the defender was passing in front him, fired i the puck into the top corner of the goal. Maine was visibly deflated afterwards and their chances at winning were starting to fade. The Black Bears were able to collect themselves and attack the Cornell cage from time to time but Cornell prevented any extended zone time. Needing 2 goals, coach Ben Barr pulled Östman with three minutes to go in the game. The extra skater gave Maine enough of an advantage to finally get some shots on goal but most were from the perimeter and low percentage. Dalton Bancroft missed an empty net with about 30 seconds to play but that didn't affect the final score and Cornell moved on to the regional final.

==== Regional final ====
March 30, 2024; 4:00 pm	(1) Denver	2–1 (1–1, 1–0, 0–0)	(3) Cornell	MassMutual Center; Attendance: 4,407

Game reference

Matt Davis
Goalies
Ian Shane
Referees:
Colin Kronforst
Andrew Bruggeman
Linesmen:
Sam Shikowsky
Tommy George

	0–1	06:44 – Nick Desantis (8) (Seger, Penney)
(Webster, Buckberger) Miko Matikka (20) – 18:31	1–1
(S. Buium, Z. Buium) Sam Harris (14) – GW PP – 39:56	2–1

2 min
Penalties
4 min
18
Shots
25

Game summary
The game began with Denver testing Cornell's defense. The Pioneers managed to cause a turnover that led to a scoring chance in the slot but Ian Shane made the stop. Cornell fought through the early difficulty and then slowly got up to speed. After establishing themselves in the offensive zone, the Big Red fired a barrage on the Denver cage. Matt Davis made several stops but was unable to freeze the puck in a scramble. When Davis tried to regain his footing, Nick DeSantis found the puck and shot it between the goaltender's legs for the first goal of the game. Cornell kept with their defensive game afterwards and prevented Denver from setting up their offense. The Pioneers were able to get several rushes up the ice and get shots on goal but they were not able to sustain any presence in Cornell's end. On one of Cornell's counter rushes up the ice, DeSantis tried to make a move around Kieran Cebrian but the Denver defenseman ended up committing an interference penalty. Half-way through the man-advantage, a Cornell defender fell down inside the offensive blueline and allowed Denver to get on a 2-on-0 break. With Cornell backchecking hard, the Jared Wright made a rushed shot in close that Shane was able to stop. Cornell's offense continued to earn chances following defensive plays and Jonathan Castagna broke in on the Denver cage. Davis made the save but, again, could not freeze the puck. A follow-up chance from a sharp angle missed a partially open cage and sailed high. With about 90 seconds to play, a turnover just inside the Cornell blueline by McKade Webster got the puck to Miko Matikka and he rifled a shot into the top corner from the top of the circle.

The second began with DeSantis getting a partial break on the Denver net but Davis was able to make the save. Denver tried to get their high-powered offense going afterwards but the Cornell defense continued their oppressive style and limit the Pioneers. The Big Red were able to use a sizable advantage in the faceoff circle to ice the puck and get out of trouble without giving Denver a subsequent scoring chance. Even when Denver was able to get a shot on goal, they were quite often one-and-done with Cornell either able to clear the puck or Shane freezing it for a faceoff. In the middle of the period, there were several circumstances where penalties could have been called on either team but the officials appeared comfortable in letting the physical play occur. It wasn't until well past the midway point of the period that either team was able to get some extended zone time and Cornell was able to cycle the puck in the Denver end. The Big Red threw the puck across the frost of the cage several times but they weren't able to get a grade-A chance on goal. Cornell continued to press in the offensive zone and was nearly able to take the lead when a shot from the point by Ben Robertson trickled past Davis and slid just past the outside of the right post. In the final few minutes of the period, Denver was finally able to get set up in the offensive zone but the Cornell defense still would not give the Pioneers a clean shot at the net. Jacob Kraft made several blocks to keep the puck away from Shane and eventually cleared the zone. With under a minute to play, Castagna hit Jack Devine late and was whistled for a minor penalty. With just seconds left in the period, Sam Harris was able to tip a Shai Buium shot between Shane's legs. The puck squeaked through the goaltender's pads and had just enough momentum to slide into the net.

With the lead for the first time, Denver looked far more relaxed at the start of the third. Cornell, however, was undeterred and kept playing their game. Denver managed to get the forecheck working and forced the Big Red into coughing up the puck multiple times. While the Pioneers got scoring chances from the mistakes, Cornell's defense was able to recover in time to stop any further scoring. At about the 12-minute mark, Cornell was able to convert a turnover into a tremendous scoring chance but Davis kept shots from both Kyle Penney and DeSantis out of the goal. As the Big Red began to switch to a more offensive style, Denver was able to get better looks on Shane. With about six minutes to play, a scrum next to the Pioneers resulted in the puck getting to an open Cornell player in the high slot. Just before he was about to shoot, the referees whistled the play dead for a hand-pass. Cornell pressed harder, looking for the tying goal and got several good looks on goal. With about three minutes to play, Castagna nearly made up for his penalty when he slapped a one-timer at an open goal but the puck just fluttered wide. Thirty seconds later, Shane was pulled for an extra attacker and David Carle called a timeout to give the Pioneers a breather. Gabriel Seger won the ensuing draw but Ryan Walsh was immediately called for a slashing minor. Cornell quickly got the puck up the ice but with Shane remaining in goal the Big Red had little chance to score on the penalty kill. at the 90-second mark, Ian Shane fumbled a clearing attempt and the puck came to Devine right in front of the net. When he went to shoot the puck it hopped and was sent wide. Cornell managed to kill of the disadvantage and tried to set up a tying goal. Seger found Walsh off to the side of the cage but his one-timer was stopped by Davis and Denver advanced to the Frozen Four.

=== Midwest Region – Maryland Heights, Missouri ===
==== Regional semifinals ====
March 29, 2024; 4:00 pm	(1) Michigan State	5–4 (OT) (0–1, 2–3, 2–0, 1–0)	(4) Western Michigan	Centene Community Ice Center; Attendance: 3,148

Game reference

Trey Augustine
Goalies
Cameron Rowe
Referees:
Joseph Carusone
C. J. Hanafin
Linesmen:
Ryann Knapp
Patrick Dapuzzo

	0–1	7:29 – Matteo Costantini (11) (Hilsendager, Wendt)
(Geary, Basgall) Daniel Russell (9) – 25:05	1–1
(Dorwart) David Gucciardi (9) – 30:25	2–1
	2–2	32:51 – PP – Alex Bump (14) (Grainger, Sjolund)
	2–3	34:42 – Sam Colangelo (24) (Bump)
	2–4	36:11 – Zak Galambos (9) (Michaels, Fiedler)
(Shoudy, Kelly) Nash Nienhuis (9) – 48:15	3–4
(Levshunov, Howard) Karsen Dorwart (15) – EA – 59:05	4–4
(Nienhuis, Augustine) Jeremy Davidson (12) – GW – 68:47	5–4

2 min
Penalties
2 min
32
Shots
38

Game summary
Michigan State got on its horses straight away and put pressure on the WMU cage. Cameron Rowe had to stop the first six shots of the game and the Broncos didn't get the puck on Trey Augustine until the 5-minute mark. MSU dominated play through the first seven minutes but when Western finally got set up in the offensive zone, Matteo Costantini was able to use a screen by several players to beat Augustine from the top of the right circle for the first goal. The Broncos started getting the puck down low, behind the Michigan State goal line, and tried to win the puck with a combination of speed and board battles. The Spartans counterattacked with a solid backcheck and generated several chances off of the rush. The play between the two teams was fairly even for several minutes with both squads getting scoring chances though neither was able to sustain a continual attack. Both teams played physically throughout the period but Western seemed to get the better of the exchange.

Western Michigan got off to a quick start in the second and attacked the MSU net. Augustine and the defense were able to turn them away and allow the Spartan offense to take their turn in the offensive zone. At about the 3-minute mark, Wyatt Schingoethe got the puck at the top of the blue paint from a cross-crease pass but Augustine managed to slide over and make the save on the one-timer. Two minutes later, a stretch pass from Matt Basgall found Daniel Russell at center ice and gave the Spartan forward a 100-foot break away. Just as he got to the slot, Russell fired the puck through Rowe's six-hole to tie the game. The pace picked up afterwards and both gets got back to their speed game. After a few minutes, a shot from Daniel Hilsendager was stopped by Augustine but the puck squeaked through his arms and fell to the ice in the crease. Fortunately for Michigan State, a Spartan defender was first on the scene and he helped his goaltender freeze the puck for a faceoff. Coming out of the mid-period TV timeout, MSU won the offensive zone faceoff and David Gucciardi blasted the puck past Rowe from the blue line. Western went on the attack following the goal but MSU was able to clear the puck after a couple of chances. As the Broncos continued to press, Gavin O'Connell was called for a hooking penalty and give Western the first power play of the night. WMU won the faceoff and moved the puck around the Michigan State zone until it came to Alex Bump to the left of the goal He tried to pass the puck across the net but it deflected off of a defender's skate into the net. After tying the game, Western continued to pressure the Spartans and after a bouncing puck eluded an MSU player at center ice, Bump found a streaking Sam Colangelo who wired the puck into the goal past Augustine's Blocker. Michigan State tried to match the Broncos' effort but instead they could only watch as Zak Galambos scored a marker that was a mirror-image of the earlier Gucciardi goal, again, to Augustine's blocker-side. With the game starting to get away from them, MSU attacked the Western end vigorously and forced Galambos into a hooking penalty. Western challenged the play for a dive by Russell but the officials did not see enough evidence for a matching minor. Western was able to kill off the rest of the period but still left them with a minute more on the PK to start the third.

MSU was unable to get much going once play resumed and squandered their man-advantage. Western continued to carry the play and Luke Grainger nearly scored when his chip-shot from the low slot clanked off of the post and stayed out. Michigan State tried to get something going to cut into the Broncos' lead but every time they touched the puck a Western player was there to force the issue. Tim Washe was very conspicuous with several hard hits in the third but the Spartans refused to quit. Near the middle of the period, a turnover by Western at the own blue line allowed Michigan State to finally establish some zone time and eventually Nash Nienhuis was able to fire the puck past a screened Cameron Rowe to cut the lead to 1. WMU got right back to its high-pressure game after the goal and tried to regain their 2-goal lead but the Spartans had regained their footing and the two teams started exchanging scoring chances. With about six minutes to play, Bump got on a partial break from center ice but Augustine stood tall and made the save. After the play, an earlier hit by Washe was reviewed for a major penalty (contact to the head) but the officials decided against leveling an infraction. Once play resumed, the two goaltender both committed turnovers after handling the puck that led to scoring opportunities but neither surrendered a goal. With under three minutes to play, a second goal got behind Augustine after a save but MSU managed to clear the puck away. Moments later, after Augustine was pulled for an extra attacker, Rowe made a save but could not freeze the puck. The loose biscuit dribbled just to the side before being cleared by Western. Michigan State managed to prevent an attempt on their open goal and then raced up the ice. With less than a minute left, Artyom Levshunov skated the puck up the right side of the ice and, as he was approaching the goal line, he found Karsen Dorwart alone in front of the goal for the tying marker. The final 55 seconds passed to no effect and overtime was needed to settle the game.

The play settled down once overtime began with both teams playing a bit more hesitantly on their forechecking. The result was that though each team could now get into the offensive zone, much of the play was restricted to the perimeter. However, as play wore on, Michigan State began to turn zone time into scoring opportunities and Rowe was forced to stop several good chances. Western, conversely, was unable to get anything going offensively and didn't get a single shot on goal through eight minutes of play. Near the middle of the period, a Jeremy Davidson took a seemingly harmless shot on goal from the half wall but it deflected off of Hilsendager's stick past Rowe for the winning goal.

March 29, 2024; 7:30 pm	(2) North Dakota	3–4 (1–0, 1–1, 1–3)	(3) Michigan	Centene Community Ice Center; Attendance: 3,148

Game reference

Ludvig Persson
Goalies
Jake Barczewski
Referees:
Ryan Sweeney
Brendan Blanchard
Linesmen:
Brendan Lewis
Joe Sherman

(Wiebe) Hunter Johannes (12) – 4:46	1–0
	1–1	21:37 – Frank Nazar (17) (Holtz, Estapa)
(Pehrson, McLaughlin) Jackson Blake (22) – 28:18	2–1
	2–2	40:50 – Dylan Duke (23) (Fantilli)
	2–3	42:23 – T. J. Hughes (19) (Schifsky, T. Duke)
	2–4	51:56 – GW – Dylan Duke (24) (Hughes, Schifsky)
(Pehrson) Jackson Kunz (9) – 54:31	3–4

2 min
Penalties
2 min
27
Shots
30

Game summary

==== Regional final ====
March 31, 2024; 5:30 pm	(1) Michigan State	2–5 (1–0, 0–1, 1–4)	(3) Michigan	Centene Community Ice Center; Attendance: 3,148

Game reference

Trey Augustine
Goalies
Jake Barczewski
Referees:
Geoff Miller
Steven Rovillard
Linesmen:
Kevin Briganti
Nick Briganti

(Basgall, Howard) Gavin O'Connell (15) – PP – 6:20	1–0
	1–1	25:41 – Ethan Edwards (3) (D. Duke, Hughes)
	1–2	46:29 – Marshall Warren (4) (Truscott, Schifsky)
(Muller) Joey Larson (16) – PP – 50:26	2–2
	2–3	52:42 – GW – Dylan Duke (25) (Hughes, Schifsky)
	2–4	52:54 – Gavin Brindley (25) (Nazar, Edwards)
	2–5	57:41 – PP – Dylan Duke (26) (Brindley, Edwards)

12 min
Penalties
8 min
40
Shots
35

Game summary

=== Frozen Four – Saint Paul, Minnesota ===
==== National semifinal ====
April 11, 2024; 8:10 pm	(E1) Boston College	4–0 (1–0, 2–0, 1–0)	(MW3) Michigan	Xcel Energy Center; Attendance: 18,598

Game reference

Jacob Fowler
Goalies
Jake Barczewski
Referees:
Ryan Hersey
Nathan Wieler
Linesmen:
Tyler Liffrig
Erik Contino

(Leonard, Perreault) Will Smith (24) – 1:20	1–0
(Perreault, Gustafsson) Will Smith (25) – 32:25	2–0
(unassisted) Cutter Gauthier (38) – 33:14	3–0
(unassisted) Gabe Perreault (19) – 45:03	4–0

8 min
Penalties
6 min
22
Shots
32

Game summary
Michigan started the game on the attack, getting several opportunities in the first minute plus. When Boston College counterattacked, Will Smith scored on the Eagle's first shot of the game over a sprawling Jake Barczewski from in tight. The goal didn't give Michigan any pause and the Wolverines got right back on the attack. Jacob Fowler had to stay dialed in and stop several good chances while the Maize and Blue searched for the equalizer. Near the middle of the period Smith nearly pulled off a miraculous move by dancing through the Wolverine defense but he lost the puck before he could get a shot on goal. A few minutes later, Mark Estapa hit Eamon Powell late and was given a minor penalty. BC got a good look early on the man-advantage but it lasted just 35 seconds before Ryan Leonard took a hooking minor. During the 4-on-4, both teams had chances but the best opportunity came just as the abbreviated Michigan power play was starting when Jake Barczewski flubbed the puck and Smith jumped on the loose rubber. Fortunately for the Wolverines, Smith didn't get much on his shot and Barczewski made the save. about 90 seconds later, Estapa was called for tripping to give the Eagles their third power play of the first period. Boston College had trouble setting up in the offensive zone and Frank Nazar ended up getting the best chance for Michigan. Both teams went on the attack for the final few minutes but a combination of good goaltending and shot blocking prevented the score from changing.

Boston College got off to a fast start in the middle period and, in the second minute, Leonard was nearly able to dance around Barczewski for a goal but the prone Wolverine netminder made the save with his right pad. A few minutes later, Cutter Gauthier received a penalty for interference. The nation's top power play looked to find a way to beat the best penalty kill. Michigan was able to get set up and move the puck but couldn't quite get a grade-A scoring chance. BC got on their horses and charged into the Michigan end afterwards. Oscar Jellvik had a great look at the net from the high slot but Gavin Brindley blocked the shot. The fast pace continued but both teams seemed to be relying more on their defense despite possessing the number two and three offenses in the nation. After the mid-way point of the game, Drew Fortescue mishandled the puck and forced himself into taking a minor penalty. BC's speed on the penalty kill caused Dylan Duke to take a matching tripping call just 24 seconds later to produce a second 4-on-4. Smith got ahold of the puck, wrapped around the goal, and fired a puck to the front of the net where it bounced off of both of Ethan Edwards' feet and into the goal. Less than a minute later, Cutter Gauthier got a breakaway from center ice and fired a shot through Barczewski's legs. BC appeared to relax after building a commanding lead but that seemed to feed into Michigan's game. In the final few minutes, the Wolverines desperately tried to cut into the lead and got several chances on goal but Fowler was equal to the task. Off of a turnover, Leonard nearly scored a fourth goal for the Eagles but the puck sailed through the crease.

In dire need of a goal, Michigan came charging out of the gate in the third and got several good looks on goal. With the Wolverines having to throw caution to the wind, Leonard was able to turn the puck over and get on a breakaway but Barczewski made the save to keep his team alive. The two teams exchanged opportunities in the first four minutes but both goaltenders remained firm. Just past the 5-minute mark, Gabe Perreault grabbed a loose puck, skated into the Michigan end, and wrapped the puck around the net for the fourth BC goal. The air came out of the Michigan balloon for a few minutes afterwards but eventually the Wolverines got back on the attack. Mike Posma made a potentially goal-saving slash near the middle of the period and gave Michigan a chance to finally get on the board with another power play. The Wolverines had their chances but they could not get the puck past Fowler. BC looked content to sit back and play defense for the rest of the game and just bleed the clock down. In the final ten minutes, the urgency seemed to have come out of Michigan's game. Even though they were still trying to score, the team was well aware that it would take a miracle for them to get back into the match. As time ticked away and Michigan remained goalless both teams accepted that the game was already over and the final few minutes passed without much issue.

April 11, 2024; 4:00 pm	(W1) Boston University	1–2 (OT) (1–0, 0–1, 0–0, 0–1)	(NE1) Denver	Xcel Energy Center; Attendance: 18,598

Game reference

Mathieu Caron
Goalies
Matt Davis
Referees:
Colin Kronforst
Andrew Bruggeman
Linesmen:
Samuel Shikowsky
Tommy George

(G. McCarthy) Luke Tuch (10) – SH – 7:45	1–0
	1–1	35:21 – Tristan Lemyre (2) (Matikka)
	1–2	71:09 – GW – Tristan Broz (16) (Behrens)

10 min
Penalties
2 min
34
Shots
29

Game summary
In the first minute of play, Macklin Celebrini found himself alone in front of the net but Matt Davis managed to make the save. BU continued to apply pressure and threaten the Denver cage in the early minutes but the Denver defense held them off. The Pioneers attempted to counterattack but the Terriers used their live legs to backcheck effectively. Denver didn't get a shot on goal until after the 5-minute mark but when the did they got a great chance off of the rebound. Fortunately for BU, Mathieu Caron was able match his counterpart and stop the puck. After the ensuing faceoff, Nick Zabaneh was called for high-sticking and gave Denver the game's first power play. The Pioneers generated several chances but, as the penalty was winding down, Luke Tuch took advantage of a the puck bouncing off of Jack Devine's skate and got a breakaway from center ice. He fired a shot into the top corner from the left circle for the game's opening goal. The pace of the game remained fast and, despite the puck spending much of its time in the Denver end, shots on goal were at a premium. In the latter half of the first, the two teams spent much of their time counterpunching. The Denver defense continued to stand strong and a hit by Sean Behrens on Celebrini with about 5-minutes to play looked to possibly be a hit to the head, however, during the next stoppage, Jay Pandolfo did not ask for a challenge before the faceoff. Boston University remained in control for much of the final few minutes. With under two to play, Sam Stevens deflected a shot on goal that nearly scored but the puck dribbled wide.

Denver started the second with a greater emphasis on their forecheck but the Terriers still remained on the attack. Celebrini got another great scoring chance about 2 minutes into the second and he tried to bunt a fluttering puck into a half open cage but it hopped wide. The Pioneers continued to struggle against the omnipresent attack from BU and were restricted to getting what little offense they could from the outside. The only thing keeping Denver in the game in the first 30 minutes of the match was their stalwart defense BU's offense kept firing shots on Davis whether it be open looks, bombs from the point, or passes across the front of the net but Davis was in place to keep his team in the game. In the back half of the second Denver was finally able to establish some zone time and after turning over the puck behind the BU cage, Miko Matikka found Tristan Lemyre for a shot that leaked through Caron to tie the score. Jared Wright nearly gave Denver the lead just seconds later when the puck bounced to him in front of the cage but Caron managed to close his five-hole in time. A minute later, Tuch pasted Devine into the board with a hard check. Shortly thereafter, Tom Willander was apparently tripped but no call was made and it was apparent that the referees had swallowed their whistles. With under 30 seconds to play, Denver got a surprise rush up the ice and Aidan Thompson got a glorious scoring chance when he beat Caron with a deke but the BU goaltender made a desperate save with his glove right in front of the goal line.

Both teams got their chances at the start of the third but neither could get the puck to cooperate. At about the 3-minute mark, Willander was given a tripping minor to give Denver its second per play chance. The Pioneers got several chances and were nearly able to score near the end from a scramble in front of the net but the Terriers defenders just managed to keep the puck out of the net. BU started to take over near the middle of the period but their momentum was arrested when Jack Harvey was whistled for a trip. The penalty was bad enough but made all the worse because just seconds before a potential boarding penalty on Denver went uncalled. The third chance for Denver was a bit more deliberate and the Pioneers didn't seem as focused as they had been on the previous two. Just as the penalty expired, Jack Devine found a loose puck and had a yawning cage as Caron had slid out of position but, for the second time in the game, the glove hand reached back and snatched the puck as it was sliding towards a sure goal. Afterwards both offenses struggled to find any kind of consistency and neither team seemed able to hold onto the puck. With under 4 minutes to play, Celebrini found Harvey alone in front of the net for a one-timer but the puck hit the post as stayed out. About 30 seconds later, Lane Hutson was tripped by a Denver play but, yet again, the referees refused to call a penalty on Denver. Chances continued to come fast and Denver had a chance off of a rush with 2 minutes to play but Caron made the save. With under 90 seconds to play, Dylan Peterson laid a hard check on Behrens on the forecheck and the defender was buried into the boards. Peterson got 2 minutes for boarding to give Denver its fourth power play of the game. Boston University pulled in tight and held the fort to keep the Pioneers mostly to the outside and they were able to bleed the clock down and force overtime.

The Terriers opened overtime by killing off the remainder of the penalty and then immediately getting back on offense. Denver counterattacked and nearly found the net from a Thompson backhander but he didn't quite have the angle. After 3 minutes, a scrum in front of the BU cage resulted in penalties on both teams and created a 4-on-4. With open ice, the Terriers carried the balance of play and Hutson made a brilliant play at the blueline to get in close but couldn't get the puck past Davis. Caron was forced to make a pair of saves afterwards to save his squad and play returned to normal. Afterwards, Sam Stevens injured his knee on what was likely a tripping penalty and, despite the puck not being in the offensive zone, the officials did not blow the play dead to provide assistance to the downed player. Even though they could not buy a call, the Terriers continued to press and a hard one-timer from Celebrini just barely missed the net. Just before the midway point of the period. A slash by Denver was again not called by the officials, leaving coach Pandolfo nearly apoplectic on the bench. About a minute later, Tristan Broz skated into the BU end and fired a shot from the right circle, it went right between Caron's legs for the winning goal.

==== National Championship ====
April 13, 2024; 5:00 pm	(E1) Boston College	0–2 (0–0, 0–2, 0–0)	(NE1) Denver	Xcel Energy Center; Attendance: 18,694

Referees: Joe Carusone; C. J. Hanafin; Linesmen: Ryan Knapp; Patrick Dapuzzo

Scoring summary
Period	Team	Goal	Assist(s)	Time	Score
1st	no scoring				
2nd	DU	Jared Wright (15) – GW	Lorenz, S. Buium	29:42	1–0 DU
2nd	DU	Rieger Lorenz (16)	Z. Buium, Behrens	35:16	2–0 DU
3rd	no scoring				
Penalty summary
Period	Team	Player	Penalty	Time	PIM
1st	no penalties				
2nd	BC	Mike Posma	Boarding	24:31	2:00
3rd	DU	McKade Webster	Holding	41:29	2:00
3rd	DU	Jack Devine	Tripping	52:06	2:00

Shots by period
Team	1	2	3	T
Denver	8	13	5	26
Boston College	5	7	23	35

Goaltenders
Team	Name	Saves	Goals against	Time on ice
DU	Matt Davis	35	0	60:00
BC	Jacob Fowler	24	2	57:23

Game summary
The game began at a modest pace with both teams probing for a weakness. Denver got the first chance when a turnover at center ice led to a 3-on-1 break but Jacob Fowler was in position to make the save. A few minutes later, BC moved the puck into the Denver zone and Cutter Gauthier shot the puck wide. The rubber rebounded behind the net and came out to Andre Gasseau. The Eagle forward had a wide-open net to shoot at but didn't quite have the right angle and his shot hit the post dead-center and stayed out. Denver controlled the puck for much of the early part of the game but BC's defense kept the Pioneers to the outside. The best chance for DU came when a missed pass by Boston College came right to Lucas Ölvestad in front of the net. Fowler slid to the top of the crease and kicked away the backhand attempt. The Eagles then counterattacked and got an odd-man rush into Denver's end and though they weren't able to score they finally got their first shot on goal. The second shot from BC came when Will Smith got a breakaway but Matt Davis was able to close his five hole in time. Denver then replied with a couple of good looks on goal but Folwer and the Boston College defense kept the game scoreless. The two teams continued to test one another and, while several chances were generated, most would not end up with a shot on goal. BC tilted the ice in its favor in the second half and began to apply pressure on the Denver defense. The Pioneers were equal to the test and held off the highly talented Eagles. Denver ended the period by getting its first shot in over 8 minutes of playing time but the period belonged to the defensive corps.

The second began with Denver on the attack but Fowler remained stout in goal. BC was quick to respond and get chances of their own and Davis had his chance to make a few saves. Nerves appeared to get the better of both teams when a series of made to end multiple attempted rushes. Just before the 5-minute mark, Mike Posma pushed McKade Webster into the end boards from behind and was given a minor for boarding. The injured Webster was taken to the locker room while his teammates tried to solve the best penalty kill in the nation. Denver was able to set up in the BC zone but several stick checks and blocked shots prevented the Pioneers from getting a shot on goal. Just before the mid-way point of the game, Oskar Jellvik found Gasseau wide open in the high slot but could not solve Davis. Gauthier had a chance off the rebound but his shot went wide. Less than a minute later, Jared Wright fired a shot from the left circle that beat Fowler but not the post. The puck rebounded and hit Fowler in the back then fluttered in the air towards the goal. The BC netminder waved blindly at the puck while two of his teammates tired desperately to knock the biscuit away from the goal but they were just not quick enough and the rubber hopped into the goal. Denver went on the attack afterwards and didn't give the Eagles any chance to even the score. Around the 7-minute mark, a flubbed pass at the Pioneer blueline gave Jared Wright a breakaway but Fowler was able to make the save from in tight. A few minutes later, Zeev Buium made a tremendous pass to Rieger Lorenz in the left circle and the Denver forward fired the puck into the near corner. Now down by a pair, the Eagles went on the attack but Denver's defense stood firm and prevented a high-quality scoring chance. The Pioneers' suffocating defense was on full display in the final minutes of the period and frustrated BC time and again.

Greg Brown changed up the lines for the third period, trying to get some spark of life for the BC offense. The Eagles got a scoring chance early and within 90 seconds, Jacob Bengtsson forced Webster into taking a minor penalty. The #2 power play took on a rather poor PK and the Eagles were able to get a tremendous chance when Gabe Perreault found Ryan Leonard wide open in the low slot. Davis jumped back across the net and somehow managed to get his glove on the shot. BC continued to press after the penalty ended but Denver had pulled back into a defensive shell and did their best to melt down the Eagle rushes. At the 8-minute mark, Smith got open in the high slot and beat Davis with a hard shot, however, the puck clanked off of the right post and bounced away from the goal. With just less than 8 minutes to play, Jack Devine made a mistake on the forecheck and took a tripping penalty. The Eagles turned the man-advantage into a shooting gallery but could not get the puck past Davis. Even though the defense blocked several shots, four grade-A chances made in on goal but BC continued to be frustrated by the junior netminder. As time wound down, Fowler remained in the net despite Boston College having possession in the Denver end. The Eagles didn't pull their goaltender until less there was less than 3 minutes to play and put the Denver goal under constant pressure in the final moments of the match. Denver's defense held and turned aside all attempts to win the 10th National Championship in program history.

== Tournament awards ==
=== All-Tournament team ===
- G: Matt Davis* (Denver)
- D: Sean Behrens (Denver)
- D: Zeev Buium (Denver)
- F: Tristan Broz (Denver)
- F: Rieger Lorenz (Denver)
- F: Will Smith (Boston College)

* Most Outstanding Player

== Record by conference ==
Conference	Bids	Record	Win %	Regional Finals	Frozen Four	Championship Game	National Champions
NCHC	4	4–3	.571	1	1	1	1
Hockey East	4	5–4	.556	2	2	1	–
Big Ten	4	4–4	.500	3	1	–	–
ECAC	2	2–2	.500	2	–	–	–
Atlantic Hockey	1	0–1	.000	–	–	–	–
CCHA	1	0–1	.000	–	–	–	–

== Media ==
=== Television ===
ESPN had US television rights to all games during the tournament for the nineteenth consecutive year. ESPN will air every game, beginning with the regionals, on ESPN2, ESPNews, or ESPNU. Additionally all matches will be streamed online via the ESPN app.

==== Broadcast assignments ====
Regionals

- Northeast Regional: Clay Matvick and Sean Ritchlin – Springfield, Massachusetts
- West Regional: Jason Ross Jr. and Paul Caponigri – Sioux Falls, South Dakota
- East Regional: John Buccigross and Colby Cohen – Providence, Rhode Island
- Midwest Regional: Roxy Bernstein and Ben Clymer – Maryland Heights, Missouri

Frozen Four

- John Buccigross, Colby Cohen, and Taylor Tannebaum – Saint Paul, Minnesota

=== Radio ===
Westwood One has exclusive radio rights to the Frozen Four and will broadcast both the semifinals and the championship.

- Brian Tripp, Dave Starman, and Shireen Saski
