= Luke Tuch =

American ice hockey player (born 2002)

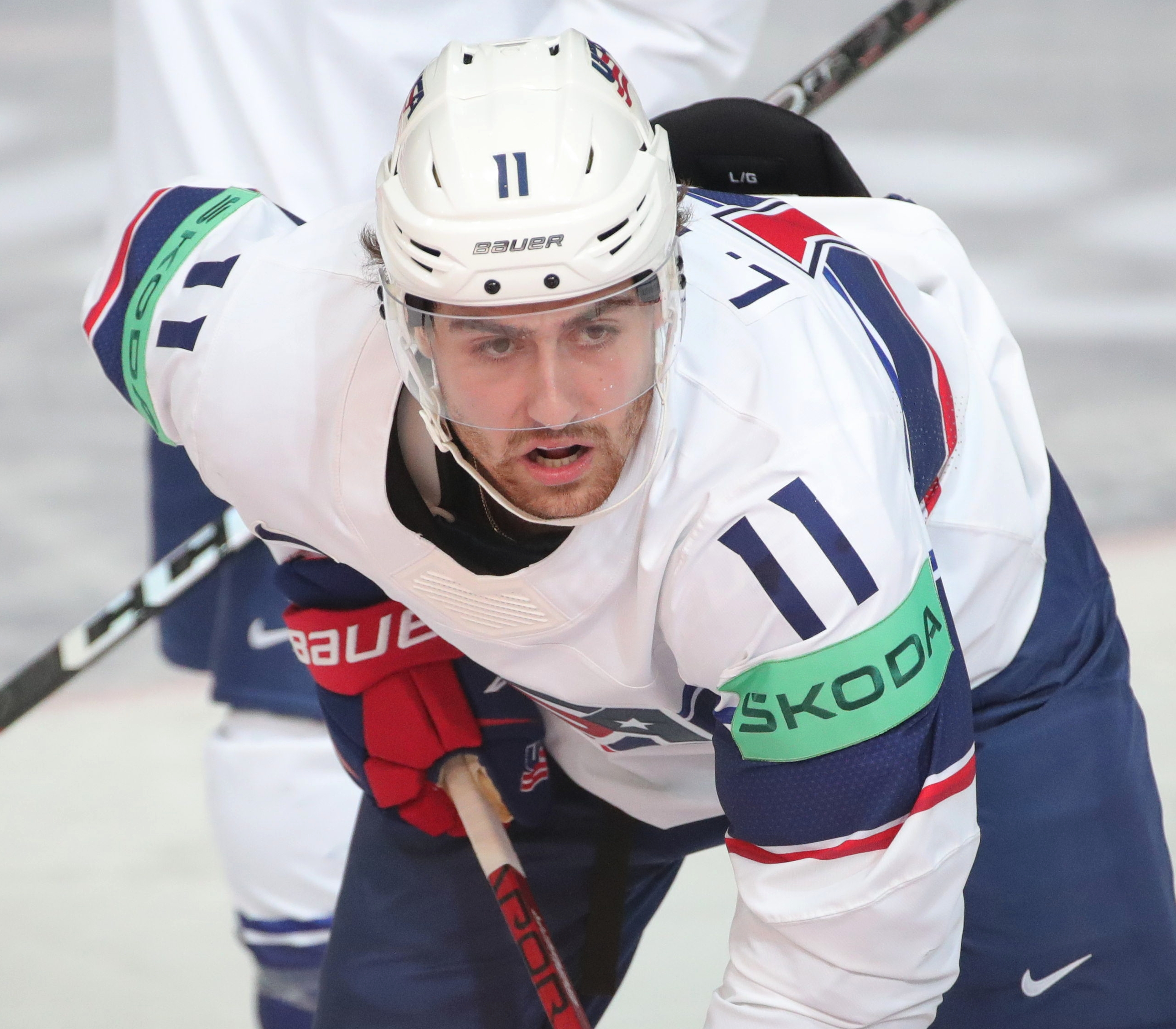
- Tuch with the United States national team in 2023
- Born: March 7, 2002 (age 24) Syracuse, New York, U.S.
- Height: 6 ft 2 in (188 cm)
- Weight: 215 lb (98 kg; 15 st 5 lb)
- Position: Left wing
- Shoots: Left
- NHL team (P) Cur. team: Columbus Blue Jackets; Cleveland Monsters (AHL)
- National team: United States
- NHL draft: 47th overall, 2020; Montreal Canadiens
- Playing career: 2024–present

Luke Tuch (/ˈtʌk/ TUCK) (born March 7, 2002) is an American professional ice hockey winger for the Cleveland Monsters of the American Hockey League (AHL) while under contract to the Columbus Blue Jackets of the National Hockey League (NHL). He was selected in the second round, 47th overall, by the Montreal Canadiens in the 2020 NHL entry draft.

== Playing career ==
=== Early years ===
As a youth, Tuch played in the 2015 iteration of the Quebec International Pee-Wee Hockey Tournament with a minor ice hockey team from Syracuse, New York.

=== Junior ===
During the 2017–18 T1EHL season, Tuch registered 12 goals and 15 assists in 36 games for the Buffalo Jr. Sabres under-16 team. He then played two seasons for the USA Hockey National Team Development Program (USNTDP) where he recorded 25 goals and 28 assists.

=== Collegiate ===
Committed to play college ice hockey for Boston University of the National Collegiate Athletic Association (NCAA) beginning in the 2020–21 season, Tuch was selected in the second round, 47th overall, by the Montreal Canadiens in the 2020 NHL entry draft.

During his freshman year, he recorded six goals and five assists in 16 games, in a season that was shortened due to the COVID-19 pandemic. Despite this, Tuch was named a unanimous selection to the Hockey East conference All-Rookie Team. The following season, he recorded six goals and four assists in 26 games as a sophomore.

In September 2022, Tuch, now a junior, was named an assistant captain ahead of the 2022–23 season. Collectively, he recorded nine goals and 11 assists in 40 games and helped lead the Terriers to the Frozen Four for the first time since 2015.

=== Professional ===
Following BU's overtime defeat to Denver during the 2024 Frozen Four, Tuch concluded his collegiate career and signed a two-year, entry-level contract with the Canadiens on April 16, 2024. He likewise agreed to a standard player contract to join the Laval Rocket, Montreal's American Hockey League (AHL) affiliate, for the remainder of the 2023–24 AHL season.

After two full seasons within the Canadiens organization as member of the Rocket, Tuch was traded to the Columbus Blue Jackets in exchange for Hunter McKown on June 25, 2026. Entering the offseason as a restricted free agent, he agreed to a two-year, two-way contract with the Blue Jackets on July 15.

== International play ==
Internationally, Tuch first represented Team USA at the 2018 World U-17 Hockey Challenge, where he recorded one goal across five games. The following year, he participated in the 2019 Five Nations Cup held in Sweden, winning a gold medal.

On May 4, 2023, Tuch was named to the United States men's national ice hockey team to compete at the 2023 IIHF World Championship. His brother, Alex, was also named to the American roster, marking the first time the brothers played together on the same team.

== Personal life ==
Tuch was born to parents Carl and Sharon in Syracuse, New York and grew up in nearby Baldwinsville. He has a fraternal twin sister, Leah, and an older brother, Alex, who is a professional ice hockey player for the Washington Capitals. The family is of Slovak ancestry.

In August 2022, Tuch, along with his brother, launched the annual Tuch Hockey Camp in their home state of New York, a non-profit endeavor which looks to raise money to support children's cancer research as well as helping those with special needs.

== Career statistics ==
=== Regular season and playoffs ===
			Regular season					Playoffs
Season	Team	League	GP	G	A	Pts	PIM	GP	G	A	Pts	PIM
2018–19	U.S. National Development Team	USHL	48	10	13	23	83	2	0	0	0	0
2019–20	U.S. National Development Team	USHL	47	15	15	30	30	—	—	—	—	—
2020–21	Boston University	HE	16	6	5	11	12	—	—	—	—	—
2021–22	Boston University	HE	26	6	4	10	16	—	—	—	—	—
2022–23	Boston University	HE	40	9	11	20	21	—	—	—	—	—
2023–24	Boston University	HE	39	10	20	30	10	—	—	—	—	—
2023–24	Laval Rocket	AHL	2	0	0	0	0	—	—	—	—	—
2024–25	Laval Rocket	AHL	44	6	8	14	40	8	1	1	2	10
2025–26	Laval Rocket	AHL	68	9	5	14	82	5	0	0	0	4
AHL totals			114	15	13	28	122	13	1	1	2	14

=== International ===
Year	Team	Event	Result	GP	G	A	Pts	PIM
2018	United States	U17	8th	5	1	0	1	8
2023	United States	WC	4th	4	1	0	1	2
Junior totals				5	1	0	1	8
Senior totals				4	1	0	1	2

== Awards and honors ==
Award	Year	Ref
USHL
USA Hockey All-American Game	2020	
College
Hockey East All-Rookie Team	2021	
