= Andre Gasseau =

American ice hockey player (born 2003)

- Born: July 3, 2003 (age 23) Garden Grove, California, U.S.
- Height: 6 ft 4 in (193 cm)
- Weight: 225 lb (102 kg; 16 st 1 lb)
- Position: Forward
- Shoots: Left
- NHL team (P) Cur. team: San Jose Sharks; San Jose Barracuda (AHL)
- NHL draft: 213th overall, 2021; Boston Bruins
- Playing career: 2026–present

Andre Gasseau (born July 3, 2003) is an American professional ice hockey player for the San Jose Barracuda of the American Hockey League (AHL) while under contract to the San Jose Sharks of the National Hockey League (NHL). He played college ice hockey for Boston College.

== Playing career ==
=== Amateur ===
Gasseau played for the USA Hockey National Team Development Program of the USHL, and during the 2020–21 season, Gasseau announced his commitment to Boston College starting in 2022-23. In the season before switching to college, Gasseau played for the Fargo Force, where he scored 22 goals and 16 assists in 60 games, leading the team.

=== Collegiate ===
In his first collegiate season, Gasseau got off to a slow start, scoring three goals and five assists in the first 17 games before New Years. However, after New Years, Gasseau found a new gear to his game. He score seven goals and 14 assists during the rest of the season, including a goal and two assists in Boston College's 5-2 victory in the opening round of the Hockey East tournament. The Eagles run would end the following round in a 1-0 loss to Merrimack, ending Gasseau's freshman season. He ended the season with 10 goals and 19 assists for 29 points.

Gasseau hoped to build off his solid freshman campaign, and got off to a good start, scoring the game winner against Quinnipiac in the season opener and scoring points in each of his first three matches. Although he would cool off afterwards, he managed his first two-goal game in college on November 17, 2023 in a 5-4 win against UConn. Gasseau and the Eagles would end up entering the Hockey East tournament as the #1 seed, and would face UConn, again winning 5-4, with Gasseau potting two assists. They would beat UMass in a rout in the next round, 8-1, and Gasseau would score another two points, this time a goal and an assist. The Eagles would matchup against their rival, Boston University, in the final, and although Gasseau went scoreless, the Eagles would win 6-2 to clinch a spot in the NCAA tournament. Gasseau and the Eagles would work their way all the way into the championship game of the tournament, where they fell to Denver. Gasseau would score one goal throughout the tournament, and finished his season with 12 goals and 17 assists in 40 games.

Gasseau would continue to be a steady presence for Boston College in the 2024-25 season. After scoring three goals and three assists in a two-game weekend series against Vermont, Gasseau was named the Hockey East Co-Player of the Week on February 24, 2025. The following week, he would score two goals against New Hampshire, and the weekend after, two assists against Merrimack to close out the regular season. For the second straight year, Gasseau and the Eagles would enter the Hockey East tournament as the top seed. This time around, however, they would get upset by eight-seeded Northeastern, although they ended up securing an at-large bid for the NCAA tournament. Gasseau would go scoreless in two games in the tournament before the Eagles again fell to Denver, this time in the second round. Gasseau ended the season with 15 goals and 15 assists in 36 games.

Prior to his senior season with Boston College, Gasseau was named one of three captains for the team. Unfortunately for Gasseau, he dealt with a hand injury in the early games of the season, before undergoing wrist surgery five games in, which would keep him out for the rest of the first half of the season. Gasseau would return to the lineup on January 16, 2026, with a bang. He scored two assists in his first game, then a goal in each of his next two games. On February 2, in the Beanpot semifinal against Harvard, Gasseau scored two assists, reaching 100 career NCAA points. The game was part of a seven-game point streak for Gasseau where he scored four goals and six assists. He would then score two goals in the Beanpot final against Boston University to clinch the tournament championship for the Eagles, their first since 2016. Unfortunately, the Eagles would lose to UConn in the second round of the Hockey East tournament, and would not receive an at-large bid to the NCAA tournament, ending Gasseau's college career.

=== Professional ===
Gasseau was drafted by the Boston Bruins in the seventh round, 213th overall, in the 2021 NHL entry draft.

After his senior season with Boston College, Gasseau was eligible to sign with the Bruins to start his professional career. However, it was reported that Gasseau would not sign with the Bruins, and would test the free agent market once he was able to, in August 2026. Before he reached free agency, however, the Bruins traded Gasseau's rights, along with their 2026 fourth-round draft pick, to the San Jose Sharks, in exchange for the Sharks' 2026 fourth-round pick, as well as a 2026 fifth-round pick, on June 18, 2026. On July 1, 2026, Gasseau signed a two-year, entry-level contract with the Sharks.

== Personal life ==
Gasseau comes from a family of hockey players. His father, James, was drafted in the sixth round of the 1984 NHL entry draft by the Buffalo Sabres, and played two seasons for their American Hockey League affiliate, the Rochester Americans. His uncle, Sandy Gasseau, played professionally for the San Diego Gulls and the Tacoma Sabercats of the West Coast Hockey League. Gasseau's younger sister, Jacqueline, currently plays for Culver Academies.

Gasseau is trained in both Muay Thai and Jujutsu, having started lessons when he was 13.

== Career statistics ==
			Regular season					Playoffs
Season	Team	League	GP	G	A	Pts	PIM	GP	G	A	Pts	PIM
2019–20	U.S. National Development Team	USHL	3	0	0	0	0	—	—	—	—	—
2020–21	U.S. National Development Team	USHL	23	3	5	8	29	—	—	—	—	—
2021–22	Fargo Force	USHL	60	22	16	38	20	2	0	0	0	2
2022–23	Boston College	HE	36	10	19	29	14	—	—	—	—	—
2023-24	Boston College	HE	40	12	17	29	27	—	—	—	—	—
2024–25	Boston College	HE	36	15	15	30	49	—	—	—	—	—
2025–26	Boston College	HE	23	6	17	23	12	—	—	—	—	—
NCAA totals			135	43	68	111	102	—	—	—	—	—
