= Matt Davis (ice hockey) =

Canadian ice hockey player (born 2001)

- Born: June 16, 2001 (age 25) Calgary, Alberta, Canada
- Height: 6 ft 1 in (185 cm)
- Weight: 195 lb (88 kg; 13 st 13 lb)
- Position: Goaltender
- Catches: Right
- AHL team: San Jose Barracuda
- NHL draft: Undrafted
- Playing career: 2025–present

Matthew Davis (born June 16, 2001) is a Canadian professional goaltender for the San Jose Barracuda of the American Hockey League (AHL). He was named the Most Outstanding Player at the 2024 NCAA Division I men's ice hockey tournament while with the University of Denver of the National Collegiate Athletic Association (NCAA).

== Playing career ==
Davis spent one season with the Green Bay Gamblers of the United States Hockey League (USHL). During the 2020–21 season, he appeared in 35 games and posted a 20–9–2 record, with a 3.34 goals against average (GAA), .895 save percentage and three shutouts.

Davis began his college ice hockey career for Denver during the 2021–22 season. During his freshman year, he served as the backup goaltender to Magnus Chrona, and appeared in six games with four starts and posted a 3–1–0 record, with a 1.96 GAA and .923 save percentage. He started his first career game on October 16, 2021, and posted a 25-save shutout against Air Force. During the 2022–23 season, in his sophomore year, he appeared in 13 games, with eight starts and posted an 8–1–0 record, with a 1.77 GAA and .925 save percentage.

During the 2023–24 season, in his junior year, he started 31 games, and posted a 23–5–3 record, with a 2.34 GAA and .917 save percentage in his first full season as a starter. He was named National Collegiate Hockey Conference (NCHC) Goaltender of the Month and Hockey Commissioners Association (HCA) Goaltender of the Month for the month of March 2024, after he posted a 9–1–0, with a 1.89 GAA and a .931 save percentage. He became the first Denver goaltender to earn the HCA Goaltender of the Month award. During the national semifinals at the 2024 NCAA Division I men's ice hockey tournament, Davis stopped 34 of 35 shots to lead Denver to a 2–1 overtime win against Boston University. During the championship game, he posted a 35 save shutout against Boston College, to help Denver win their record tenth NCAA tournament championship. During the NCAA tournament he made 138 saves and allowed just three goals in four games. Following his outstanding performance, he was named to the NCAA All-Tournament team and tournament Most Outstanding Player.

At the completion of his collegiate career, Davis embarked on the professional ranks in signing a one-year contract with the San Jose Barracuda, primary affiliate to the San Jose Sharks, on April 22, 2025.

== Career statistics ==
			Regular season									Playoffs
Season	Team	League	GP	W	L	OT	MIN	GA	SO	GAA	SV%	GP	W	L	MIN	GA	SO	GAA	SV%
2018–19	Spruce Grove Saints	AJHL	35	26	7	2	2,069	70	6	2.03	.904	18	11	7	—	—	2	2.01	.915
2019–20	Spruce Grove Saints	AJHL	39	29	9	1	2,307	93	1	2.42	.903	6	4	2	—	—	2	1.37	.944
2020–21	Green Bay Gamblers	USHL	35	20	9	2	1,866	104	3	3.34	.895	2	0	2	118	5	0	2.53	.922
2021–22	University of Denver	NCHC	6	3	1	0	275	9	1	1.96	.923	—	—	—	—	—	—	—	—
2022–23	University of Denver	NCHC	13	8	1	0	509	15	1	1.77	.925	—	—	—	—	—	—	—	—
2023–24	University of Denver	NCHC	31	23	5	3	1,871	73	3	2.34	.917	—	—	—	—	—	—	—	—
2024–25	University of Denver	NCHC	40	29	10	1	2,734	82	1	2.07	.924	—	—	—	—	—	—	—	—
2025–26	Wichita Thunder	ECHL	24	8	10	5	1,407	60	1	2.56	.928	—	—	—	—	—	—	—	—
2025–26	San Jose Barracuda	AHL	2	1	1	0	118	6	0	3.06	.902	—	—	—	—	—	—	—	—
AHL totals			2	1	1	0	118	6	0	3.06	.902	—	—	—	—	—	—	—	—

== Awards and honors ==
Award	Year
College
NCAA All-Tournament Team	2024
NCAA Tournament MVP	2024
NCHC Scholar-Athlete of the Year	2025

Awards and achievements
Preceded by Jacob Quillan	NCAA Tournament Most Outstanding Player; 2024	Succeeded by Owen Michaels
