= Five-hole =

Ice hockey term

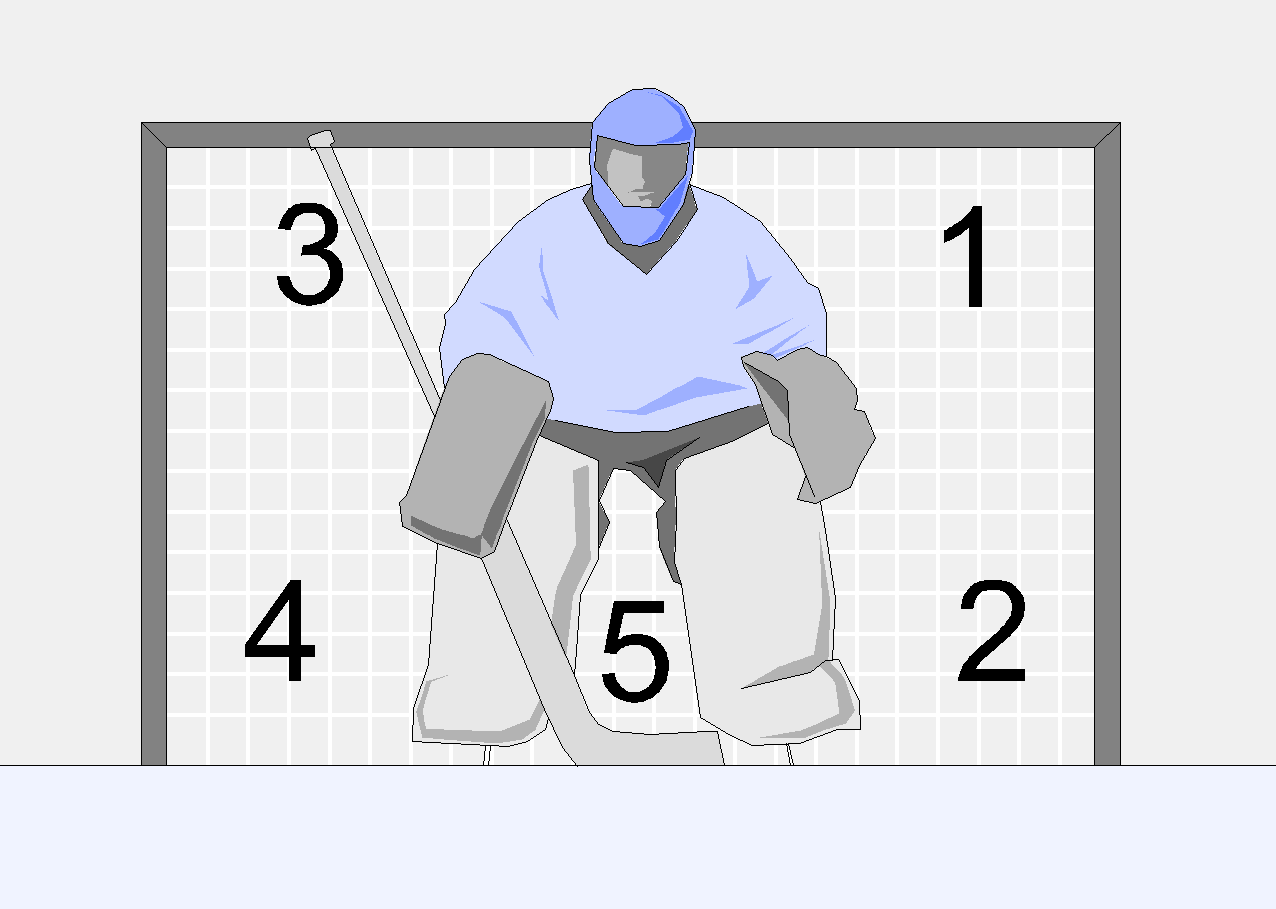
Schematics of the "holes" on an ice hockey goal. The five-hole is between the goaltender's legs.

The five-hole is an ice hockey term for the space between a goaltender's legs. The name and its first recorded usage was in 1972 by legendary goalie Jacques Plante in his book, On Goaltending. The phrases through the five-hole and gone five-hole are used when a player scores by shooting the puck into the goal between the goaltender's legs. The term is also used in basketball, association football, field hockey, and lacrosse. In baseball, the term is used to describe a wild pitch between the catcher's legs.

== Origin ==
When a goaltender stands in the net in the ready position, there are five open areas (and two closed) that the goalie must cover.

1. Glove side, high – This area is defined by the goaltender's arm and glove on the bottom, mask on the inside, and the post and top of the goal on the outside.
2. Glove side, low – This area is defined by the goaltender's arm and glove on the top, the ice on the bottom, and the outside post of the goal. During a butterfly-style save, this area is closed off completely and the glove is typically stacked on top of the leg pad as the leg is extended to cover the post.
3. Stick side, high – This area is defined by the goal post, top of the goal, and the goalie's arm and stick. The top half of the goaltender's stick is held in this area but is not commonly used for stopping the puck.
4. Stick side, low – This area is the lower half of the stick side, defined by the stick and arm, the ice, and the outer post of the goal. During a butterfly-style save, this area is also covered by the leg pad with the blocker stacked on top to protect against low shots. When a goaltender is standing, the paddle of the stick (i.e. its handle) is used to cover this area and to deflect the puck away from the net.
5. Five-hole – The fifth area is between the goalie's leg pads and skates. This area is protected by the blade of the stick at all times and is closed up by the upper leg pads when the goalie is in the butterfly position.

There are two additional areas, the 6 hole (under the glove side arm) and 7 hole (under the stick side arm), which are less commonly used terms.
