= Oskar Jellvik =

Swedish ice hockey player (born 2003)

- Born: February 8, 2003 (age 23) Täby, Sweden
- Height: 5 ft 11 in (180 cm)
- Weight: 179 lb (81 kg; 12 st 11 lb)
- Position: Centre
- Shoots: Left
- NCAA team Former teams: Boston College; Djurgårdens IF
- NHL draft: 149th overall, 2021; Boston Bruins
- Playing career: 2021–present

Oskar Jellvik is a Swedish ice hockey centre who plays for Boston College of the NCAA. He made his SHL debut for Djurgårdens IF during the 2020–21 season. Jellvik was drafted by the Boston Bruins in the fifth round of the 2021 NHL entry draft with the 149th pick in the draft.
