= Aram Minnetian =

American ice hockey player (born 2005)

- Born: March 19, 2005 (age 21) Woodcliff Lake, New Jersey, U.S.
- Height: 6 ft 0 in (183 cm)
- Weight: 209 lb (95 kg; 14 st 13 lb)
- Position: Defense
- Shoots: Right
- NHL team (P) Cur. team: Dallas Stars; Texas Stars (AHL)
- NHL draft: 125th overall, 2023; Dallas Stars
- Playing career: 2023–present

Aram Minnetian (born March 19, 2005) is an American professional ice hockey defenseman for the Texas Stars of the American Hockey League (AHL) while under contract to the Dallas Stars of the National Hockey League (NHL). He was selected by the Stars, 125th overall, in the 2023 NHL Entry Draft.

== Playing career ==
Raised in Woodcliff Lake, New Jersey, Minnetian played prep hockey at Bergen Catholic High School, where he received all-state recognition for his play as a defenseman.

He was drafted 125th overall by the Dallas Stars in the 2023 NHL Draft.

Following two seasons with the NTDP, Minnetian committed to Boston College for the 2023–24 season. As a freshman, he appeared in 40 games, recording three goals and six assists while helping the Eagles capture the Hockey East championship game. He scored the game-tying goal in the NCAA regional final against Quinnipiac, helping Boston College advance to the Frozen Four.

He signed a three-year, entry-level contract with the Stars on March 24, 2026 and reported to the Texas Stars of the AHL for the remainder of the 2025–26 season.

== Career statistics ==
			Regular season					Playoffs
Season	Team	League	GP	G	A	Pts	PIM	GP	G	A	Pts	PIM
2021–22	U.S. National Development Team	USHL	33	2	9	11	48	—	—	—	—	—
2022–23	U.S. National Development Team	USHL	22	0	6	6	26	—	—	—	—	—
2023–24	Boston College	HE	40	3	6	9	29	—	—	—	—	—
2024–25	Boston College	HE	35	2	13	15	16	—	—	—	—	—
2025–26	Boston College	HE	36	2	9	11	38	—	—	—	—	—
2025–26	Texas Stars	AHL	8	0	3	3	6	—	—	—	—	—
AHL totals			8	0	3	3	6	—	—	—	—	—
