= Hooking (ice hockey) =

Infraction in the sport of ice hockey

Hooking is a penalty in ice hockey and ringette. This article deals chiefly with ice hockey.

The National Hockey League defines it in Rule 55 as "the act of using the stick in a manner that enables a player or goalkeeper to restrain an opponent."

== Hooking in the rules ==
The NHL covers hooking in Rule 55, which defines it as "the act of using the stick in a manner that enables a player or goalkeeper to restrain an opponent." It goes on to specify that "when a player is checking another in such a way that there is only stick-to-stick contact, such action is not to be penalized as hooking." The NHL groups hooking with other "Restraining fouls" such as holding, interference and tripping.

The IIHF covers hooking in Rule 533, defining a player guilty of hooking as one "who impedes or seeks to impede the progress of an opponent by hooking him with the stick."

Both codes allow for hooking to be penalized with either a minor or major penalty; although hooking is usually a minor penalty, a major penalty can be imposed for injuring an opponent by hooking, and carries with it an automatic game misconduct.

== Emphasis in NHL ==
Following the 2004–05 NHL lockout, the NHL made "Zero tolerance on Interference, Hooking and Holding/Obstruction" its top priority for game officials.
