= 2023–24 Maine Black Bears men's ice hockey season =

Ledyard Bank Classic, Champion NCAA Tournament, Regional Semifinal
- Conference: 3rd Hockey East
- Home ice: Alfond Arena

Rankings
- USCHO: #10
- USA Hockey: #10

Record
- Overall: 23–12–2
- Conference: 14–9–1
- Home: 13–2–2
- Road: 8–8–0
- Neutral: 2–2–0

Coaches and captains
- Head coach: Ben Barr
- Assistant coaches: Alfie Michaud; Jason Fortier; Eric Soltys
- Captain(s): David Breazeale; Lynden Breen
- Alternate captain(s): Ben Poisson; Nolan Renwick

The 2023–24 Maine Black Bears Men's ice hockey season was the 49th season of play for the program, the 47th season competing at the Division I level, and the 40th in Hockey East. The Black Bears represented the University of Maine, played their home games at the Alfond Arena and were coached by Ben Barr in his 3rd season.

== Season ==
For the second year in a row, Maine had a significant amount of roster turnover but it was the addition of the Nadeau brothers, Bradly and Josh, that brought about the biggest change. The two swiftly established themselves as top offensive threat for the Black Bears and helped chance a middling team into one of the nation's top squads. They were not alone, however, as the defense, led by co-Captain David Breazeale, performed tremendously by routinely holding opposing teams under 30 shots per game. This relatively light workload enabled Victor Östman to get off to a good start and backstop the Bears to a 6–1–1 record by mid-November. With wins over defending champion Quinnipiac and #1 Boston College, Maine shot up the national rankings and found themselves in the top 10 before Thanksgiving.

A sweep at the hands of Boston University briefly halted the teams ascent but Maine proceeded to win the next seven games, including the Ledyard Bank Classic, and were positioned for an NCAA tournament berth by the start of January. Unfortunately, an injury to Östman forced the team to turn to Albin Boija as the starter for several games. The freshman played well at the start but as he assumed the majority of the workload his play began to suffer. Goaltending problems were compounded by a dip in scoring in February that saw the team lose five of six games and drop out of contention for a Hockey East championship. Maine recovered at the end of the season by sweeping Massachusetts to guarantee themselves a bye into the quarterfinal round and punch their ticket to the NCAA tournament.

They faced an old foe, New Hampshire, in the Hockey East tournament. With both teams experiencing a renaissance, the Nadeaus put their stamp on the rivalry by each scoring 4 points in the game. The unambiguous win sent Maine to the semifinals where another long-time rival, BU, used a solid performance on the power play to knock out the Black Bears.

Mine ended the year at #5 in the PairWise rankings, giving the team a #2 seed and setting them against Cornell in the Northeast Regional. Östman got his first start in over a month and the gamble seemed to pay off early when took a lead less than 6 minutes into the game. Shortly afterwards, the Big Red were handed a 5-minute major and the Black Bears had a tremendous opportunity to take over the match. Maine Pressured the Cornell cage for much of the power play but could not increase their lead. Instead, the performance by the Big Red goaltender turned the momentum against Maine and just minutes after the penalty ended, the score was tied. The Black Bears skated hard, searching to regain the lead, but nothing they threw on the net landed. Cornell, too, had its chances but Östman made several sparkling saves to keep the score knotted. Just past the midway point of the match, Cornell finally broke the tie with a straight shot from the right circle. Now with the lead, the Big Red began to play an oppressive brand of defense and limit Maine's chances. The Black Bears were unable to get many opportunities for the rest of the game and, as time slowly ticked away on their season, the team became desperate. Disaster struck when Cornell was able to get a goal off of the rush halfway through the third and all but ended Maine's chances. It wasn't until Östman was pulled that the Bears were able to get many shots on goal but nothing they tried worked and the team went down in defeat.

== Departures ==
Player	Position	Nationality	Cause
Dawson Bruneski	Defenseman	Canada	Graduate transfer to Alaska
Samuel Duerr	Defenseman	United States	Left program (retired)
Matthew Fawcett	Forward	United States	Graduation (retired)
Grant Hebert	Forward	Canada	Graduation (signed with Allen Americans)
Didrik Henbrant	Forward	Sweden	Graduation (signed with Nottingham Panthers)
Killian Kiecker-Olson	Forward	United States	Left program (retired)
Robert Kincaid	Defenseman	Canada	Left program (retired)
Michael Mancinelli	Forward	United States	Left program (retired)
Justin Michaelian	Forward	United States	Graduation (signed with Iowa Heartlanders)
Jake Mucitelli	Goaltender	United States	Left program (retired)
Jakub Sirota	Defenseman	Czech Republic	Graduation (signed with HC Olomouc)

== Recruiting ==
Player	Position	Nationality	Age	Notes
Albin Boija	Goaltender	Sweden	20	Sundsvall, SWE
Anthony Calafiore	Forward	United States	21	Staten Island, NY
Jack Dalton	Defenseman	United States	20	River Forest, IL; joined mid-season
Ryan Hopkins	Defenseman	Canada	19	Lunenburg, NS
Liam Lesakowski	Defenseman	United States	19	Buffalo, NY
Bradly Nadeau	Forward	Canada	18	Saint-François-de-Madawaska, NB; selected 30th overall in 2023
Josh Nadeau	Forward	Canada	19	Saint-François-de-Madawaska, NB
Nicholas Niemo	Forward	United States	22	Middlebury, VT; transfer from Bentley
Bodie Nobes	Defenseman	Canada	20	Kitchener, ON
Sully Scholle	Forward	United States	20	Chaska, MN
Harrison Scott	Forward	United States	22	San Jose, CA; transfer from Bentley

== Roster ==
As of March 7, 2024.

No.	Nat.	Player	Class	Pos	Height	Weight	DoB	Hometown	Previous team	NHL rights
2	(United States)	Jack Dalton	Freshman	D	6' 0" (1.83 m)	174 lb (79 kg)	2003-07-22	River Forest, Illinois	New Mexico Ice Wolves (NAHL)	—
3	(United States)	Luke Antonacci	Sophomore	D	5' 9" (1.75 m)	171 lb (78 kg)	2002-11-26	Princeton, New Jersey	Sioux City Musketeers (USHL)	—
4	(United States)	Brandon Holt	Sophomore	D	5' 11" (1.8 m)	175 lb (79 kg)	2001-04-30	Grand Forks, North Dakota	New Mexico Ice Wolves (NAHL)	—
5	(Canada)	Ryan Hopkins	Freshman	D	6' 1" (1.85 m)	183 lb (83 kg)	2004-04-15	Penticton, British Columbia	Penticton Vees (BCHL)	—
6	(United States)	Liam Lesakowski	Freshman	D	6' 5" (1.96 m)	220 lb (100 kg)	2003-12-12	Buffalo, New York	Cedar Rapids RoughRiders (USHL)	—
10	(United States)	Cole Hanson	Junior	F	5' 11" (1.8 m)	175 lb (79 kg)	2000-09-19	Grand Forks, North Dakota	Colgate (ECAC)	—
11	(Canada)	Donavan Villeneuve-Houle	Senior	F	6' 0" (1.83 m)	196 lb (89 kg)	1999-11-04	Montreal, Quebec	Flin Flon Bombers (SJHL)	—
12	(Canada)	Ben Poisson (A)	Graduate	F	6' 1" (1.85 m)	196 lb (89 kg)	1999-08-31	Vancouver, British Columbia	Prince George Spruce Kings (BCHL)	—
14	(United States)	Sully Scholle	Freshman	F	5' 10" (1.78 m)	170 lb (77 kg)	2003-03-19	Chaska, Minnesota	New Mexico Ice Wolves (NAHL)	—
15	(United States)	Brandon Chabrier	Sophomore	D	6' 0" (1.83 m)	178 lb (81 kg)	2002-07-19	Bayville, New York	Madison Capitols (USHL)	—
16	(Canada)	Aidan Carney	Sophomore	F	6' 4" (1.93 m)	195 lb (88 kg)	2001-09-08	Paradise Valley, Arizona	Amarillo Wranglers (NAHL)	—
17	(Canada)	Félix Trudeau	Sophomore	F	6' 2" (1.88 m)	189 lb (86 kg)	2002-09-24	Terrebonne, Quebec	West Kelowna Warriors (BCHL)	—
18	(United States)	Parker Lindauer	Sophomore	F	5' 11" (1.8 m)	172 lb (78 kg)	2001-05-17	Madison, Wisconsin	Muskegon Lumberjacks (USHL)	—
20	(Canada)	Josh Nadeau	Freshman	F	5' 8" (1.73 m)	158 lb (72 kg)	2003-10-22	Saint-François-de-Madawaska, New Brunswick	Penticton Vees (BCHL)	—
21	(United States)	Reid Pabich	Sophomore	F	5' 11" (1.8 m)	175 lb (79 kg)	2001-10-05	Verona, Wisconsin	Madison Capitols (USHL)	—
22	(United States)	Harrison Scott	Junior	F	6' 0" (1.83 m)	185 lb (84 kg)	2000-09-27	San Jose, California	Bentley (AHA)	—
23	(Canada)	Grayson Arnott	Sophomore	D	5' 9" (1.75 m)	152 lb (69 kg)	2001-06-14	Toronto, Ontario	Penticton Vees (BCHL)	—
24	(Canada)	Nolan Renwick (A)	Sophomore	F	6' 3" (1.91 m)	211 lb (96 kg)	2001-02-16	Milestone, Saskatchewan	Omaha Lancers (USHL)	—
25	(United States)	Nicholas Niemo	Sophomore	F	5' 9" (1.75 m)	165 lb (75 kg)	2001-03-28	Middlebury, Vermont	Bentley (AHA)	—
26	(Scotland)	Thomas Freel	Sophomore	F	5' 11" (1.8 m)	180 lb (82 kg)	2001-06-26	Aberdeen, Scotland	Ottawa Jr. Senators (CCHL)	—
27	(Canada)	Lynden Breen (C)	Senior	F	5' 9" (1.75 m)	173 lb (78 kg)	2001-05-31	Grand Bay-Westfield, New Brunswick	Fargo Force (USHL)	—
28	(United States)	Anthony Calafiore	Freshman	F	5' 9" (1.75 m)	170 lb (77 kg)	2002-04-06	Staten Island, New York	New Jersey Titans (NAHL)	—
30	(Sweden)	Albin Boija	Freshman	G	6' 1" (1.85 m)	181 lb (82 kg)	2003-08-20	Sundsvall, Sweden	Växjö J20 (J20 Nationell)	—
32	(Sweden)	Victor Östman	Senior	G	6' 4" (1.93 m)	205 lb (93 kg)	2000-10-03	Danderyd, Sweden	Chicago Steel (USHL)	—
33	(United States)	Connor Androlewicz	Senior	G	6' 2" (1.88 m)	194 lb (88 kg)	2000-11-28	St. Louis, Missouri	Lincoln Stars (USHL)	—
34	(Canada)	Bodie Nobes	Freshman	D	5' 10" (1.78 m)	185 lb (84 kg)	2003-07-18	Sainte-Thérèse, Quebec	Green Bay Gamblers (USHL)	—
37	(United States)	David Breazeale (C)	Junior	D	6' 4" (1.93 m)	201 lb (91 kg)	2000-04-22	Grandville, Michigan	Shreveport Mudbugs (NAHL)	—
82	(Canada)	Bradly Nadeau	Freshman	F	5' 10" (1.78 m)	163 lb (74 kg)	2005-05-05	Saint-François-de-Madawaska, New Brunswick	Penticton Vees (BCHL)	CAR, 30th overall 2023

== Standings ==
2023–24 Hockey East Standings
	Conference record										Overall record					
	GP	W	L	T	OTW	OTL	SW	PTS	GF	GA	GP	W	L	T	GF	GA
#2 Boston College †*	24	20	3	1	1	0	1	61	105	56	41	34	6	1	183	89
#3 Boston University	24	18	4	2	1	1	1	57	104	53	40	28	10	2	163	97
#10 Maine	24	14	9	1	0	1	0	44	76	67	37	23	12	2	119	94
#16 Providence	24	11	9	4	3	1	2	37	66	58	35	18	13	4	100	83
#13 Massachusetts	24	12	10	2	4	2	0	36	57	62	37	20	14	3	108	105
#20 New Hampshire	24	12	11	1	1	0	0	36	69	56	36	20	15	1	106	90
Northeastern	24	9	14	1	1	3	0	30	65	71	36	17	16	3	113	97
Connecticut	24	9	14	1	1	1	1	29	49	77	36	15	19	2	90	105
Vermont	24	7	14	3	1	0	3	26	52	81	35	13	19	3	87	106
Merrimack	24	6	17	1	0	1	1	21	62	85	35	13	21	1	98	114
Massachusetts Lowell	24	4	17	3	1	4	0	18	39	78	36	8	24	4	72	113
Championship: March 23, 2024 † indicates regular season champion * indicates conference tournament champion (Lamoriello Trophy); Rankings: USCHO Division I Men's Poll

== Schedule and results ==
Date	Time	Opponent^{#}	Rank^{#}	Site	TV	Decision	Result	Attendance	Record
Exhibition
October 7	5:00 pm	vs. New Hampshire*		Jack Kelley Rink • Waterville, Maine (Rivalry, Exhibition)	ESPN+	Östman	W 3–2	1,452	
Regular Season
October 12	7:00 pm	Renssealer*		Alfond Arena • Orono, Maine	ESPN+	Östman	W 4–1	4,135	1–0–0
October 13	7:00 pm	Renssealer*		Alfond Arena • Orono, Maine	ESPN+	Östman	W 6–3	5,143	2–0–0
October 27	7:00 pm	at #5 Quinnipiac*		M&T Bank Arena • Hamden, Connecticut	ESPN+, NESN	Östman	W 2–1 ^{OT}	2,771	3–0–0
October 28	7:00 pm	at #5 Quinnipiac*		M&T Bank Arena • Hamden, Connecticut	ESPN+	Östman	L 1–4	2,614	3–1–0
November 3	7:00 pm	at Merrimack	#20	J. Thom Lawler Rink • North Andover, Massachusetts	ESPN+	Östman	W 2–1	2,438	4–1–0 (1–0–0)
November 4	7:00 pm	at Merrimack	#20	J. Thom Lawler Rink • North Andover, Massachusetts	ESPN+	Östman	W 5–4	2,189	5–1–0 (2–0–0)
November 10	7:00 pm	#1 Boston College	#13	Alfond Arena • Orono, Maine	ESPN+	Östman	W 3–2	5,043	6–1–0 (3–0–0)
November 11	7:00 pm	#1 Boston College	#13	Alfond Arena • Orono, Maine	ESPN+	Östman	T 2–2 ^{SOL}	5,043	6–1–1 (3–0–1)
November 17	7:00 pm	at #8 Boston University	#9	Agganis Arena • Boston, Massachusetts (Rivalry)	ESPN+, NESN	Östman	L 2–3	4,393	6–2–1 (3–1–1)
November 18	6:00 pm	at #8 Boston University	#9	Agganis Arena • Boston, Massachusetts (Rivalry)	ESPN+	Östman	L 4–5	5,858	6–3–1 (3–2–1)
December 1	7:00 pm	#15 New Hampshire	#11	Alfond Arena • Orono, Maine (Rivalry)	ESPN+	Boija	W 5–2	5,043	7–3–1 (4–2–1)
December 3	5:00 pm	Connecticut	#11	Alfond Arena • Orono, Maine	ESPN+	Östman	W 7–3	4,661	8–3–1 (5–2–1)
December 6	7:00 pm	at Union*	#8	Achilles Rink • Schenectady, New York	ESPN+	Östman	W 3–1	1,192	9–3–1
December 9	7:00 pm	vs. Bentley*	#8	Cross Insurance Arena • Portland, Maine	ESPN+	Östman	W 3–2	6,291	10–3–1
Ledyard Bank Classic
December 29	4:00 pm	vs. #18 RIT*	#8	Thompson Arena • Hanover, New Hampshire (Ledyard Bank Semifinal)	ESPN+	Östman	W 5–2	2,555	11–3–1
December 30	7:30 pm	at Dartmouth*	#8	Thompson Arena • Hanover, New Hampshire (Ledyard Bank Championship)	ESPN+	Östman	W 5–1	2,886	12–3–1
January 5	7:00 pm	Colgate*	#7	Alfond Arena • Orono, Maine	ESPN+	Boija	W 3–1	4,785	13–3–1
January 6	7:00 pm	Colgate*	#7	Alfond Arena • Orono, Maine	ESPN+	Boija	T 4–4 ^{OT}	5,043	13–3–2
January 12	7:00 pm	at Connecticut	#7	XL Center • Hartford, Connecticut	ESPN+	Östman	W 5–3	4,377	14–3–2 (6–2–1)
January 13	3:00 pm	at Connecticut	#7	XL Center • Hartford, Connecticut	ESPN+	Boija	L 0–2	9,428	14–4–2 (6–3–1)
January 19	7:00 pm	Massachusetts Lowell	#8	Alfond Arena • Orono, Maine	ESPN+	Östman	W 5–3	5,043	15–4–2 (7–3–1)
January 20	7:00 pm	Massachusetts Lowell	#8	Alfond Arena • Orono, Maine	ESPN+	Boija	W 7–2	5,043	16–4–2 (8–3–1)
February 2	7:00 pm	at Northeastern	#6	Matthews Arena • Boston, Massachusetts	ESPN+	Östman	L 3–6	3,507	16–5–2 (8–4–1)
February 3	7:00 pm	at #11 Massachusetts	#6	Mullins Center • Amherst, Massachusetts	ESPN+	Boija	W 1–0	7,737	17–5–2 (9–4–1)
February 9	7:00 pm	#10 Providence	#7	Alfond Arena • Orono, Maine	ESPN+	Boija	W 2–1	5,043	18–5–2 (10–4–1)
February 10	7:00 pm	#10 Providence	#7	Alfond Arena • Orono, Maine	ESPN+	Boija	L 3–4 ^{OT}	4,745	18–6–2 (10–5–1)
February 16	7:00 pm	at #19 New Hampshire	#7	Whittemore Center • Durham, New Hampshire (Rivalry)	ESPN+, NESN	Boija	L 2–6	6,501	18–7–2 (10–6–1)
February 17	7:00 pm	at #19 New Hampshire	#7	Whittemore Center • Durham, New Hampshire (Rivalry)	ESPN+	Östman	L 2–5	6,501	18–8–2 (10–7–1)
February 23	7:00 pm	Northeastern	#9	Alfond Arena • Orono, Maine	ESPN+	Boija	W 5–1	4,684	19–8–2 (11–7–1)
February 24	7:00 pm	Northeastern	#9	Alfond Arena • Orono, Maine	ESPN+	Boija	L 0–4	4,777	19–9–2 (11–8–1)
March 1	7:00 pm	at Vermont	#9	Gutterson Fieldhouse • Burlington, Vermont	ESPN+	Boija	L 1–2	3,218	19–10–2 (11–9–1)
March 2	7:30 pm	at Vermont	#9	Gutterson Fieldhouse • Burlington, Vermont	ESPN+	Boija	W 3–2	3,177	20–10–2 (12–9–1)
March 8	7:00 pm	#12 Massachusetts	#9	Alfond Arena • Orono, Maine	ESPN+	Boija	W 2–1	5,043	21–10–2 (13–9–1)
March 9	7:00 pm	#12 Massachusetts	#9	Alfond Arena • Orono, Maine	ESPN+	Boija	W 4–3	5,043	22–10–2 (14–9–1)
Hockey East Tournament
March 16	7:00 pm	#17 New Hampshire*	#8	Alfond Arena • Orono, Maine (Quarterfinal, Rivalry)	ESPN+	Boija	W 5–0	5,043	23–10–2
March 22	7:30 pm	vs. #2 Boston University*	#7	TD Garden • Boston, Massachusetts (Semifinal, Rivalry)	ESPN+, NESN	Boija	L 1–4	17,850	23–11–2
NCAA Tournament
March 28	5:30 pm	vs. #12 Cornell*	#6	MassMutual Center • Springfield, Massachusetts (Northeast Regional Semifinal)	ESPNews	Östman	L 1–3	5,765	23–12–2
*Non-conference game. ^{#}Rankings from USCHO.com Poll. All times are in Eastern Time. Source:

== NCAA tournament ==
=== Regional semifinal ===
March 28, 2024; 6:59 pm	(2) Maine	1–3 (1–1, 0–1, 0–1)	(3) Cornell	MassMutual Center; Attendance: 5,765

Game reference

Victor Östman
Goalies
Ian Shane
Referees:
Colin Kronforst
Andrew Bruggeman
Linesmen:
Sam Shikowsky
Tommy George

(Villeneuve-Houle) Harrison Scott (15) – 5:43	1–0
	1–1	13:56 – Kyle Penney (10) (Seger)
	1–2	32:09 – GW – Sullivan Mack (6) (unassisted)
	1–3	50:31 – Sullivan Mack (7) (unassisted)

2 min
Penalties
5 min
32
Shots
18

Game summary
The start to the game was delayed by an hour and a half due to the other semifinal going into overtime. Once the match began, however, Maine jumped on the puck and attacked the Cornell cage. Ian Shane was able to hold off the Black Bears and The Big Red's staunch defense swiftly came to his aid. Play evened out afterwards and Cornell began to test the Maine goaltender. On a missed chance by the Big Red, the puck was quickly moved up the ice by the Bears. When the Cornell defender blew a tire, Harrison Scott was able to skate to an open spot in the slot and fire the puck over Shane's glove. A few minutes later, Ryan Walsh left his feet when he went to check Bradly Nadeau along the half wall and was given a major penalty. Maine used the time well, keeping the pressure on the Cornell net for most of the 5 minutes but they were unable to build on their lead. After killing off the penalty, Cornell got back to its game and began to pressure Maine on the forecheck. Gabriel Seger was able to steal the puck in the offensive zone and sent the rubber to an open Kyle Penney. Penney walked in a fired the shot from the high slot, beating Östman in the top corner. Maine carried the balance of play for the remainder of the period but were stymied by the Cornell defense.

Both teams were skating at the start of the second and ended up exchanging odd-man rushes. As the period wore on, Maine began to take control of the game but on one of the few established zone times for Cornell, Parker Lindauer was whistled for holding and gave the Big Red their first power play of the night. After wasting the first half of the man-advantage, Cornell got two glorious opportunities from the left side of the net but missed the cage both times. Jonathan Castagna then one-timed a laser from the right side but Östman made a brilliant save to keep the game tied. The two then spent several minutes probing for the next goal and, just past the 12-minute mark, Sullivan Mack intercepted the puck on an attempted clear, skated towards the goal and just before a Maine player got within reach, fired the puck past Östman's blocker for Cornell's first lead of the evening. The Big Red carried the momentum for several minutes afterwards but Maine eventually evened out the play. With about 2 minutes to play, George Fegaras attempted to clear the puck but sent it right to a Maine player at his own blue line. Ben Poisson fired the puck on goal and in the ensuing scramble, Sully Scholle ended up skewing Shane's arm when he went for the puck. After a stoppage to check on Shane's health, the goalie remained in the net. Cornell's defense was called upon once more at the end of the period and Maine's offense was held at bay.

Cornell got to its game as soon as the third began and did its best to strangle the Maine offense. The Big Red kept the puck in the Bears' end as much as they could, generating scoring chances when they could, but doing so primarily to prevent any shots from being directed at their own cage. Maine wasn't able to get much going until about five minutes into the period but even then Shane was equal to the task. Maine continued to attack but very few of their chances ended up getting on goal. Just after the midway point of the game, Sullivan Mack deflected the puck away from Bradly Nadeau in front of his own net and broke out on an odd-man rush. He skated towards the Maine goal and, just as the defender was passing in front him, fired i the puck into the top corner of the goal. Maine was visibly deflated afterwards and their chances at winning were starting to fade. The Black Bears were able to collect themselves and attack the Cornell cage from time to time but Cornell prevented any extended zone time. Needing 2 goals, coach Ben Barr pulled Östman with three minutes to go in the game. The extra skater gave Maine enough of an advantage to finally get some shots on goal but most were from the perimeter and low percentage. Dalton Bancroft missed an empty net with about 30 seconds to play but that didn't affect the final score and Cornell moved on to the regional final.

== Scoring statistics ==
Name	Position	Games	Goals	Assists	Points	PIM
Bradly Nadeau	C/W	37	19	27	46	12
Josh Nadeau	LW/RW	37	18	27	45	12
Lynden Breen	C	37	9	21	30	20
Harrison Scott	F	37	15	12	27	18
Donovan Houle-Villeneuve	C	36	9	15	24	22
Brandon Chabrier	D	37	6	16	22	22
Thomas Freel	C	37	6	16	22	8
Ben Poisson	F	37	6	9	15	21
Brandon Holt	D	33	4	11	15	18
Sully Scholle	F	33	7	4	11	10
Nolan Renwick	RW	25	2	9	11	14
David Breazeale	D	37	2	7	9	10
Cole Hanson	F	34	4	4	8	4
Grayson Arnott	D	25	2	3	5	6
Félix Trudeau	LW	24	3	2	5	6
Reid Pabich	C	21	1	4	5	4
Luke Antonacci	D	37	0	5	5	10
Anthony Calafiore	RW	19	2	2	4	0
Nicholas Niemo	F	17	2	2	4	4
Ryan Hopkins	D	24	1	2	3	8
Parker Lindauer	F	16	1	1	2	23
Liam Lesakowski	D	34	0	2	2	36
Albin Boija	G	18	0	1	1	0
John Dalton	D	8	0	0	0	0
Victor Östman	G	21	0	0	0	0
Bodie Nobes	D	19	0	0	0	17
Total			119	202	321	322

== Goaltending statistics ==
Name	Games	Minutes	Wins	Losses	Ties	Goals against	Saves	Shut outs	SV %	GAA
Albin Boija	18	1014:32	10	6	1	34	373	2	.916	2.01
Victor Östman	21	1197:56	13	6	1	56	462	0	.892	2.80
Empty Net	-	21:45	-	-	-	4	-	-	-	-
Total	37	2234:13	23	12	2	94	835	2	.899	2.52

== Rankings ==
Poll	Week																										
Poll	Pre	1	2	3	4	5	6	7	8	9	10	11	12	13	14	15	16	17	18	19	20	21	22	23	24	25	26 (Final)
USCHO.com	NR	NR	NR	NR	20	13	9	10	11	8	8 (2)	–	7 (4)	7 (2)	8 (1)	6 (1)	6 (1)	7	7	9	9	9	8	7	6	–	10
USA Hockey	NR	NR	NR	NR	20т	13	9	12	11	8	8	8	8^	7	8	6	5	7	8	9	9	9	8	7	6	10	10

Note: USCHO did not release a poll in weeks 11 and 25.
Note: USA Hockey did not release a poll in week 12.

== Awards and honors ==
Player	Award	Ref
Bradly Nadeau	Hockey East Second Team	
Josh Nadeau	Hockey East Third Team	
Bradly Nadeau	Hockey East Rookie Team	
