= 2023–24 New Hampshire Wildcats men's ice hockey season =

- Conference: T–5th Hockey East
- Home ice: Whittemore Center

Rankings
- USCHO: #20
- USA Hockey: #19

Record
- Overall: 20–15–1
- Conference: 12–11–1
- Home: 14–4–1
- Road: 6–11–0

Coaches and captains
- Head coach: Mike Souza
- Assistant coaches: Glenn Stewart; Jeff Giuliano
- Captain: Alex Gagne
- Alternate captain(s): Harrison Blaisdell; Nikolai Jenson

The 2023–24 New Hampshire Wildcats Men's ice hockey season was the 98th season of play for the program and the 40th in Hockey East. The Wildcats represented the University of New Hampshire, played their home games at the Whittemore Center and were coached by Mike Souza in his 6th season.

== Season ==
Hoping to continue their strong play from the end of the previous season, New Hampshire began the year with a tough slate by facing preseason #1 Boston University in the opener. Surprisingly, the Wildcats outscored the Terriers and planted their flag early in the year. UNH then earned a split with the defensing national champions, Quinnipiac, but not everything was looking good. Tyler Muszelik had been in goal for all three games and allowed 4 goals in each. Even so, the team was set to continue with the sophomore netminder in goal but he was knocked out of the lineup with a lower body injury in the third week of the season.

Transfer Jakob Hellsten took over in goal and the goaltending results improved immediately. Over the next four games, hardly allowed a goal, albeit against weaker opposition. Hellsten played so well that when Muszelik had recovered the two goalies had to share the crease. This situation only made the difference between the two more stark as Hellsten swiftly proved to be the better of the two. In the meantime, New Hampshire's offense continued to score at an impressive rate. The Wildcats scored at least 3 goals in eight of their first thirteen games and entered the break in a prime position to finally end their NCAA tournament drought.

After the winter break, Muszelik had the worst game of his career, allowing 5 goals on 13 shots against Army. While the Wildcats were good enough at the time to absorb the loss, it was the last real opportunity for Muszelik in goal and Hellsten would start all but one game for the rest of the season. The UNH defense did a good job insulating their goaltender as the Wildcats were the #3 team in the nation in shots allowed (23.5 per game). That assistance helped Hellsten's efforts to keep the puck out of the net, however, the Wildcats began experiencing other troubles.

The offense that had carried the team in the first half of the year suddenly found it difficult to score consistently. UNH squandered several chances to win games by failing to score and went .500 over their final 14 games. Though the team was not helped by that middling stretch, New Hampshire was saved due to the fact that the Hockey East was the top-ranked league in college hockey that year. Even with their up and down play, the Wildcats remained in the top-20 by season's end and still had a small chance at earning an at-large bid.

With UNH starting in the first round of the conference tournament, the team would need to at least make the semifinal round if not the conference championship game to make the tournament. As the 6th seed, the Wildcats opened against last-place Massachusetts Lowell. Hellsten set a new program record by posting his third consecutive shutout which, coincidentally, all came against the River Hawks. The offense was barely visible in the match but New Hampshire would have to hope that that was a one-off and the scoring would return in the quarterfinals. Unfortunately, the trend continued and their long-time rival Maine was more than happy to take advantage. The Wildcats only managed to muster 18 shots on goal and none of them found the back of the net. To make matters worse, UNH was whistled for five penalties in the game and the two power play goals from the Black Bears were more than enough to end New Hampshire's season.

== Departures ==
Player	Position	Nationality	Cause
Ryan Black	Forward	United States	Graduation (retired)
Damien Carfagna	Defenseman	United States	Transferred to Ohio State
Nico DeVita	Defenseman	United States	Transferred to Ferris State
Jake Dunlap	Forward	United States	Transferred to Ohio State
Kalle Eriksson	Defenseman	Sweden	Graduation (signed with Almtuna IS)
David Fessenden	Goaltender	United States	Graduate transfer to Canisius
Joe Hankinson	Forward	United States	Graduation (retired)
Will Margel	Forward	United States	Transferred to Mercyhurst
Cade Penney	Defenseman	Canada	Left program (retired)
Chase Stevenson	Forward	Canada	Graduation (retired)

== Recruiting ==
Player	Position	Nationality	Age	Notes
Ryan Conmy	Forward	United States	18	Alexandria, VA; selected 182nd overall in 2023
Brendan Fitzgerald	Defenseman	United States	20	North Reading, MA
Zach Hahn	Defenseman	United States	21	Huntington, NY
Jakob Hellsten	Goaltender	Sweden	23	Ljusdal, SWE; transfer from North Dakota
Marty Laviņš	Forward	Latvia	20	Riga, LAT
Luis Lindner	Defenseman/Forward	Austria	22	Spittal an der Drau, AUT; transfer from American International
Nick Ring	Forward	United States	19	Hingham, MA
Jason Siedem	Forward	United States	20	Madison, NJ
J. P. Turner	Forward	United States	20	East Falmouth, MA
Ronan Walsh	Forward	United States	21	Andover, NH

== Roster ==
As of July 10, 2023.

No.	Nat.	Player	Class	Pos	Height	Weight	DoB	Hometown	Previous team	NHL rights
1	(United States)	Jeremy Forman	Senior	G	5' 10" (1.78 m)	150 lb (68 kg)	1999-09-22	Northbrook, Illinois	Corpus Christi IceRays (NAHL)	—
2	(United States)	Jack Babbage	Junior	D	6' 1" (1.85 m)	185 lb (84 kg)	2000-08-30	Tully, New York	Quinnipiac (ECAC)	—
3	(United States)	Conor Lovett	Junior	F	5' 11" (1.8 m)	200 lb (91 kg)	2001-04-07	Franklin, Massachusetts	Cedar Rapids RoughRiders (USHL)	—
5	(United States)	Zach Hahn	Freshman	D	6' 2" (1.88 m)	205 lb (93 kg)	2002-08-06	Huntington, New York	P.A.L. Jr. Islanders (NCDC)	—
6	(Latvia)	Marty Laviņš	Freshman	F	6' 1" (1.85 m)	185 lb (84 kg)	2003-04-10	Riga, Latvia	Cedar Rapids RoughRiders (USHL)	—
7	(Russia)	Stiven Sardarian	Sophomore	F	6' 1" (1.85 m)	170 lb (77 kg)	2003-02-07	Saint Petersburg, Russia	Youngstown Phantoms (USHL)	BUF, 88th overall 2021
8	(United States)	Nikolai Jenson (A)	Senior	D	5' 11" (1.8 m)	193 lb (88 kg)	2000-07-28	Cold Spring, Minnesota	Youngstown Phantoms (USHL)	—
9	(United States)	Connor Sweeney	Junior	F	6' 2" (1.88 m)	200 lb (91 kg)	2000-05-05	North Andover, Massachusetts	Islanders Hockey Club (NCDC)	—
10	(United States)	Ronan Walsh	Freshman	F	6' 4" (1.93 m)	210 lb (95 kg)	2002-05-03	Andover, New Hampshire	Amarillo Wranglers (NAHL)	—
12	(United States)	Liam Devlin	Junior	F	5' 11" (1.8 m)	192 lb (87 kg)	2001-01-07	Needham, Massachusetts	Omaha Lancers (USHL)	—
13	(United States)	Nick Cafarelli	Senior	F	5' 10" (1.78 m)	182 lb (83 kg)	2001-12-31	Middleton, Massachusetts	Wenatchee Wild (BCHL)	—
15	(Austria)	Luis Lindner	Junior	D	5' 11" (1.8 m)	170 lb (77 kg)	2001-05-16	Spittal an der Drau, Austria	American International (AHA)	—
16	(Canada)	Luke Reid	Senior	D	6' 0" (1.83 m)	192 lb (87 kg)	2001-09-26	Warman, Saskatchewan	Chicago Steel (USHL)	NSH, 166th overall 2020
17	(Latvia)	Kristaps Skrastiņš	Sophomore	F	5' 10" (1.78 m)	180 lb (82 kg)	2001-11-20	Grobiņa, Latvia	Amarillo Wranglers (NAHL)	—
18	(Canada)	Harrison Blaisdell (A)	Senior	F	5' 11" (1.8 m)	190 lb (86 kg)	2001-03-18	Regina, Saskatchewan	North Dakota (NCHC)	WPG, 134th overall 2019
19	(United States)	Brendan Fitzgerald	Freshman	D	6' 0" (1.83 m)	165 lb (75 kg)	2003-03-06	North Reading, Massachusetts	Cedar Rapids RoughRiders (USHL)	—
20	(United States)	Colton Huard	Junior	D	6' 3" (1.91 m)	200 lb (91 kg)	2000-11-27	Foothill Ranch, California	Chicago Steel (USHL)	—
21	(United States)	Cam Gendron	Senior	D	6' 3" (1.91 m)	181 lb (82 kg)	1999-02-05	Hampstead, New Hampshire	New Jersey Titans (NAHL)	—
22	(United States)	J. P. Turner	Freshman	F	6' 0" (1.83 m)	195 lb (88 kg)	2003-01-31	East Falmouth, Massachusetts	Fargo Force (USHL)	—
23	(United States)	Jason Siedem	Freshman	F	5' 10" (1.78 m)	185 lb (84 kg)	2002-10-17	Madison, New Jersey	Blackfalds Bulldogs (AJHL)	—
24	(United States)	Robert Cronin	Junior	F	5' 10" (1.78 m)	187 lb (85 kg)	2000-08-15	Plymouth, Massachusetts	Dubuque Fighting Saints (USHL)	—
25	(United States)	Nick Ring	Freshman	F	5' 10" (1.78 m)	180 lb (82 kg)	2003-10-26	Abington, Massachusetts	Sioux Falls Stampede (USHL)	—
26	(United States)	Morgan Winters	Sophomore	F	5' 11" (1.8 m)	165 lb (75 kg)	2001-12-08	Osprey, Florida	Omaha Lancers (USHL)	—
28	(United States)	Alex Gagne (C)	Junior	D	6' 4" (1.93 m)	207 lb (94 kg)	2002-08-12	Bedford, New Hampshire	Muskegon Lumberjacks (USHL)	TBL, 192nd overall 2021
29	(United States)	Cy LeClerc	Sophomore	F	5' 9" (1.75 m)	180 lb (82 kg)	2002-08-17	Brentwood, New Hampshire	Janesville Jets (NAHL)	—
30	(United States)	Tyler Muszelik	Sophomore	G	6' 3" (1.91 m)	190 lb (86 kg)	2004-07-01	Long Valley, New Jersey	NTDP (USHL)	FLA, 189th overall 2022
35	(United States)	Rafe Gaughan	Senior	G	6' 1" (1.85 m)	185 lb (84 kg)	2000-02-11	Somersworth, New Hampshire	Northeast Generals (NA3HL)	—
36	(United States)	Ryan Conmy	Freshman	F	5' 10" (1.78 m)	190 lb (86 kg)	2004-10-23	Alexandria, Virginia	Sioux City Musketeers (USHL)	LAK, 182nd overall 2023
37	(Sweden)	Jakob Hellsten	Junior	G	6' 0" (1.83 m)	185 lb (84 kg)	2000-02-02	Ljusdal, Sweden	North Dakota (NCHC)	—

== Standings ==
2023–24 Hockey East Standings
	Conference record										Overall record					
	GP	W	L	T	OTW	OTL	SW	PTS	GF	GA	GP	W	L	T	GF	GA
#2 Boston College †*	24	20	3	1	1	0	1	61	105	56	41	34	6	1	183	89
#3 Boston University	24	18	4	2	1	1	1	57	104	53	40	28	10	2	163	97
#10 Maine	24	14	9	1	0	1	0	44	76	67	37	23	12	2	119	94
#16 Providence	24	11	9	4	3	1	2	37	66	58	35	18	13	4	100	83
#13 Massachusetts	24	12	10	2	4	2	0	36	57	62	37	20	14	3	108	105
#20 New Hampshire	24	12	11	1	1	0	0	36	69	56	36	20	15	1	106	90
Northeastern	24	9	14	1	1	3	0	30	65	71	36	17	16	3	113	97
Connecticut	24	9	14	1	1	1	1	29	49	77	36	15	19	2	90	105
Vermont	24	7	14	3	1	0	3	26	52	81	35	13	19	3	87	106
Merrimack	24	6	17	1	0	1	1	21	62	85	35	13	21	1	98	114
Massachusetts Lowell	24	4	17	3	1	4	0	18	39	78	36	8	24	4	72	113
Championship: March 23, 2024 † indicates regular season champion * indicates conference tournament champion (Lamoriello Trophy); Rankings: USCHO Division I Men's Poll

== Schedule and results ==
Date	Time	Opponent^{#}	Rank^{#}	Site	TV	Decision	Result	Attendance	Record
Exhibition
October 7	5:00 pm	vs. Maine*		Jack Kelley Rink • Waterville, Maine (Rivalry, Exhibition)	ESPN+	Hellsten	L 2–3	1,452	
Regular Season
October 13	7:00 pm	#1 Boston University		Whittemore Center • Durham, New Hampshire	ESPN+, NESN	Muszelik	W 6–4	6,070	1–0–0 (1–0–0)
October 20	7:00 pm	#4 Quinnipiac*		Whittemore Center • Durham, New Hampshire	ESPN+	Muszelik	L 2–5	5,689	1–1–0
October 21	7:00 pm	#4 Quinnipiac*		Whittemore Center • Durham, New Hampshire	ESPN+, NESN	Muszelik	W 5–4 ^{OT}	5,169	2–1–0
October 26	7:00 pm	#18 Northeastern		Whittemore Center • Durham, New Hampshire	ESPN+	Hellsten	W 4–1	3,613	3–1–0 (2–0–0)
October 28	7:00 pm	Dartmouth*		Whittemore Center • Durham, New Hampshire (Rivalry)	ESPN+	Hellsten	W 3–1	4,258	4–1–0
November 3	7:00 pm	#7 Providence	#15	Whittemore Center • Durham, New Hampshire	ESPN+	Hellsten	T 1–1 ^{SOL}	6,501	4–1–1 (2–0–1)
November 4	7:00 pm	at #7 Providence	#15	Schneider Arena • Providence, Rhode Island	ESPN+	Hellsten	L 0–2	2,850	4–2–1 (2–1–1)
November 17	7:00 pm	at Northeastern	#13	Matthews Arena • Boston, Massachusetts	ESPN+	Muszelik	W 4–2	2,612	5–2–1 (3–1–1)
November 18	7:00 pm	Northeastern	#13	Whittemore Center • Durham, New Hampshire	ESPN+	Hellsten	W 4–0	6,010	6–2–1 (4–1–1)
November 24	7:00 pm	at #20 RIT*	#12	Gene Polisseni Center • Henrietta, New York	FloHockey, NESN	Muszelik	L 4–5	2,365	6–3–1
November 25	5:00 pm	at #20 RIT*	#12	Gene Polisseni Center • Henrietta, New York	FloHockey, NESN	Hellsten	W 4–3 ^{OT}	2,610	7–3–1
December 1	7:00 pm	at #11 Maine	#15	Alfond Arena • Orono, Maine (Rivalry)	ESPN+	Hellsten	L 2–5	5,043	7–4–1 (4–2–1)
December 9	4:00 pm	Rensselaer*	#16	Whittemore Center • Durham, New Hampshire	ESPN+	Muszelik	W 1–0	5,299	8–4–1
December 29	7:00 pm	at Army*	#16	Tate Rink • West Point, New York	FloHockey	Muszelik	L 3–6	2,610	8–5–1
December 30	7:00 pm	at Sacred Heart*	#16	Martire Family Arena • Fairfield, Connecticut	FloHockey	Hellsten	W 6–2	3,368	9–5–1
January 5	7:00 pm	Princeton*	#17	Whittemore Center • Durham, New Hampshire	ESPN+	Hellsten	W 5–2	4,190	10–5–1
January 6	4:00 pm	Princeton*	#17	Whittemore Center • Durham, New Hampshire	ESPN+	Hellsten	W 3–1	4,449	11–5–1
January 13	6:00 pm	at #2 Boston University	#16	Agganis Arena • Boston, Massachusetts	ESPN+	Hellsten	L 0–3	5,359	11–6–1 (4–3–1)
January 19	7:00 pm	at Connecticut	#17	Toscano Family Ice Forum • Storrs, Connecticut	ESPN+, NESN	Hellsten	W 5–0	2,691	12–6–1 (5–3–1)
January 21	4:00 pm	Connecticut	#17	Whittemore Center • Durham, New Hampshire	ESPN+, NESN	Hellsten	L 1–2	5,482	12–7–1 (5–4–1)
January 26	7:00 pm	at Vermont	#17	Gutterson Fieldhouse • Burlington, Vermont	ESPN+	Hellsten	L 1–2	2,604	12–8–1 (5–5–1)
January 27	7:00 pm	at Vermont	#17	Gutterson Fieldhouse • Burlington, Vermont	ESPN+	Muszelik	W 6–3	3,150	13–8–1 (6–5–1)
February 2	7:00 pm	#3 Boston University	#18	Whittemore Center • Durham, New Hampshire	ESPN+	Hellsten	L 3–6	6,501	13–9–1 (6–6–1)
February 3	7:00 pm	Merrimack	#18	Whittemore Center • Durham, New Hampshire	ESPN+	Hellsten	W 3–1	5,080	14–9–1 (7–6–1)
February 9	7:00 pm	at #1 Boston College	#17	Conte Forum • Chestnut Hill, Massachusetts	ESPN+	Hellsten	L 1–6	6,608	14–10–1 (7–7–1)
February 10	7:00 pm	at Merrimack	#17	J. Thom Lawler Rink • North Andover, Massachusetts	ESPN+	Hellsten	L 1–3	2,639	14–11–1 (7–8–1)
February 16	7:00 pm	#7 Maine	#19	Whittemore Center • Durham, New Hampshire (Rivalry)	ESPN+, NESN	Hellsten	W 6–2	6,501	15–11–1 (8–8–1)
February 17	7:00 pm	#7 Maine	#19	Whittemore Center • Durham, New Hampshire (Rivalry)	ESPN+	Hellsten	W 5–2	6,501	16–11–1 (9–8–1)
February 23	7:00 pm	at #14 Massachusetts	#16	Mullins Center • Amherst, Massachusetts	ESPN+	Hellsten	L 2–3	6,089	16–12–1 (9–9–1)
February 24	7:00 pm	#14 Massachusetts	#16	Whittemore Center • Durham, New Hampshire	ESPN+	Hellsten	W 3–2 ^{OT}	6,085	17–12–1 (10–9–1)
March 1	7:00 pm	#1 Boston College	#17	Whittemore Center • Durham, New Hampshire	ESPN+	Hellsten	L 3–5	6,501	17–13–1 (10–10–1)
March 3	5:00 pm	at #1 Boston College	#17	Conte Forum • Chestnut Hill, Massachusetts	ESPN+	Hellsten	L 0–1	5,402	17–14–1 (10–11–1)
March 8	7:15 pm	at Massachusetts Lowell	#18	Tsongas Center • Lowell, Massachusetts	ESPN+, NESN	Hellsten	W 4–0	4,986	18–14–1 (11–11–1)
March 9	7:00 pm	Massachusetts Lowell	#18	Whittemore Center • Durham, New Hampshire	ESPN+, NESN	Hellsten	W 4–0	5,885	19–14–1 (12–11–1)
Hockey East Tournament
March 13	7:00 pm	Massachusetts Lowell*	#17	Whittemore Center • Durham, New Hampshire (Opening Round)	ESPN+, NESN	Hellsten	W 1–0	4,032	20–14–1
March 16	7:00 pm	at #8 Maine*	#17	Alfond Arena • Orono, Maine (Quarterfinal, Rivalry)	ESPN+	Hellsten	L 0–5	5,043	20–15–1
*Non-conference game. ^{#}Rankings from USCHO.com Poll. All times are in Eastern Time. Source:

== Scoring statistics ==
Name	Position	Games	Goals	Assists	Points	PIM
Ryan Conmy	RW	34	14	17	31	14
Cy LeClerc	F	36	10	18	28	17
Morgan Winters	F	33	10	12	22	19
Colton Huard	D	36	5	17	22	16
Liam Devlin	F	28	13	7	20	37
Robert Cronin	F	33	4	12	16	14
Luke Reid	D	36	1	15	16	18
Harrison Blaisdell	C	32	11	3	14	24
Stiven Sardarian	C/RW	32	7	7	14	12
Marty Laviņš	C	35	5	9	14	6
Alex Gagne	D	36	1	13	14	24
Kristaps Skrastiņš	C	35	5	7	12	4
Nick Cafarelli	F	28	6	5	11	41
J. P. Turner	C	24	4	6	10	21
Nick Ring	F	34	2	8	10	6
Luis Lindner	D/F	36	0	10	10	2
Nikolai Jenson	D	35	4	5	9	12
Jack Babbage	D	15	1	4	5	0
Brendan Fitzgerald	D	28	0	5	5	44
Connor Sweeney	F	32	0	4	4	8
Cam Gendron	F	10	1	2	3	2
Conor Lovett	F	20	1	2	3	0
Jason Siedem	F	8	1	0	1	0
Jeremy Forman	G	1	0	0	0	0
Zach Hahn	D	1	0	0	0	0
Tyler Muszelik	G	8	0	0	0	0
Jakob Hellsten	G	28	0	0	0	0
Total			106	188	294	349

== Goaltending statistics ==
Name	Games	Minutes	Wins	Losses	Ties	Goals Against	Saves	Shut Outs	SV %	GAA
Jakob Hellsten	28	1675:11	15	12	1	57	570	5	.909	2.04
Tyler Muszelik	8	478:27	3	3	0	27	187	1	.874	3.38
Empty Net	-	21:04	-	-	-	6	-	-	-	-
Total	36	2174:57	20	15	1	90	757	6	.894	2.48

== Rankings ==
Poll	Week																										
Poll	Pre	1	2	3	4	5	6	7	8	9	10	11	12	13	14	15	16	17	18	19	20	21	22	23	24	25	26 (Final)
USCHO.com	NR	NR	NR	NR	15	14т	13	12	15	16	16	–	17	16	17	17	18	17	19	16	17	18	17	19	19	–	20
USA Hockey	NR	NR	NR	NR	16	15	13	10	14	16	16	16	–	16	17	16	17	17	19	17	17	18	17	18	19	19	19

Note: USCHO did not release a poll in weeks 11 or 25.
Note: USA Hockey did not release a poll in week 12.

== Awards and honors ==
Player	Award	Ref
Alex Gagne	Hockey East Third Team	
