= 2023–24 Boston University Terriers men's ice hockey season =

NCAA Tournament, National Semifinal
- Conference: 2nd Hockey East
- Home ice: Agganis Arena

Rankings
- USCHO.com: #3
- USA Hockey: #3

Record
- Overall: 28–10–2
- Conference: 18–4–2
- Home: 14–2–0
- Road: 10–4–2
- Neutral: 2–4–0

Coaches and captains
- Head coach: Jay Pandolfo
- Assistant coaches: Joe Pereira; Kim Brandvold; Brian Daccord
- Captain: Case McCarthy
- Alternate captains: Lane Hutson; Sam Stevens; Luke Tuch; Cade Webber

The 2023–24 Boston University Terriers Men's ice hockey season was the 102nd season of play for the program and 40th in Hockey East. The Terriers represented Boston University in the 2023–24 NCAA Division I men's ice hockey season, played their home games at Agganis Arena and were coached by Jay Pandolfo in his 2nd season.

== Season ==
Long before the start of the season, Jay Pandolfo pulled off a recruiting coup by getting top prospect Macklin Celebrini to commit to BU. With Celebrini, as well as several NHL draft picks being added to a club that had just made the Frozen Four, Boston University was seen by many as the prohibitive favorite for the national championship and entered the season with the #1 ranking. Despite much of the attention being focused elsewhere, much of BU's success would depend upon the success of transfer Mathieu Caron. The former Brown netminder was an experienced college starter but had yet to play as many games or as difficult a schedule as he was sure to face with the Terriers.

The team had a less than stellar start, dropping two of their first three games while Caron appeared like he was not ready for prime time. However, by the end of October, both he and the defense settle down and the team started looking like the championship contender that many were expecting. Wins over top teams like North Dakota, Maine and Quinnipiac allowed the Terriers to climb back towards the top of the polls and they were in the top 5 by the time they paused for the winter break.

Upon their return, the team picked up right where they had left off and continued to pile up the wins. By late January, the Terriers were on a 12–1 run and set to take on cross-town rival Boston College. For the first time in the history, the two teams would meet ranked as the top two teams in the nation and the match was broadcast in both the United States and Canada (an extreme rarity for a regular season game). Unfortunately for the Terriers, the team was unable to solve the BC defense and fell 1–4 in the first game (thanks to two empty-net goals). The second match saw a bit more offense but BU was unable to get a lead in the match. The Eagles used the nation's #2 offense to great effect and scored 4 goals on just 25 shots. The sweep dropped BU down to #3 but they did not have long to wait to get revenge as the Beanpot was just a week away.

Celebrini got BU an early lead with 2 goals before seven minutes had elapsed. After BC cut the lead in half, the Terriers scored twice more, this time thanks to Luke Tuch, and took a commanding lead with just 15 minutes left in the match. BU had to fend off a furious comeback attempt and surrendered two markers but managed to hold onto their lead and advance to the tournament championship. In another internationally televised game, BU widely outplayed Northeastern but they were not able to get any separation from the Huskies. Despite outshooting NU 23–8 in the first two periods, BU was only a goal ahead goin into the third. The Huskies raised their level of play and tied the match in the final frame to force overtime. Again, in the 3-on-3 extra session, BU was obviously the better of the two, keeping control of the puck for most of the overtime. With under 30 seconds to play, Tom Willander misplayed a loose puck and Northeastern was able to get a clean shot from the left circle that beat Caron and win in a stunning upset.

Though disappointed by the loss, BU was still a virtual lock to make the NCAA tournament and they got right back to their winning ways. The team redoubled its efforts on defense and finished the year with 5 straight wins. The Terriers entered the playoffs as the #2 team in the nation and were guaranteed a #1 seed in the NCAA tournament no matter what happened in the conference playoffs. BU's first postseason game gave them another chance at revenge when Northeastern arrived for the quarterfinal match. The Huskies season was on the line but that did not stop the Terriers from building a three-goal lead with a strong second period. The team began to show some nerves when Northeastern scored twice to cut the lead down to 1 but Celebrini ended the come back attempt with his 30th goal of the season just 26 seconds later to turn the game's momentum. After ending the Huskies' season, BU headed to the TD Garden where another rival, Maine, awaited. Caron played a strong game in goal stopping 32 of 33 shots with the only Black Bear marker coming on the power play. BU, on the other hand, was more economical with their offense and scored four times on 18 shots. Celebrini assisted on three scores, including the empty net goal with under 30 seconds to play.

The championship game set BU against BC for the fourth time that season and the #1 seed was once again on the line. However, the Terriers got into penalty trouble in the game and BC made them pay. The Eagles scored four goals on the man-advantage and there was little BU could do to overcome that self-inflicted handicap. The loss left Boston University as the #2 team and, due to a confluence of NCAA seeding rules, forced the Terriers to be placed into the West Regional bracket.

Opening the tournament 1,000 miles from home, the Terriers took on RIT. The Tigers got off to a quick start but Caron kept the puck out of the goal in the first 10 minutes. BU was able to score twice in the first to take a solid lead but a power play goal from RIT halved the lead by the time the first intermission rolled around. BU then dominated play in the middle period and were able to double their lead heading into the third. After Jack Harvey scored the 5th goal for the Terriers, the team pulled back their offense and tried to just bleed the clock down. the two teams each scored in the final 5 minutes but that did not chance the game's outcome and BU moved on to the regional final.

Facing the team that had eliminated them the year before, BU got off to a decent start against Minnesota but that were not able to solve the Gopher goaltender for the first quarter of the game. Minnesota, on the other hand, seemed to have Caron's number and scored twice in the first period. Shortly after their second goal, Quinn Hutson had the puck knocked off of his stick but it rolled towards the goal. The puck somehow leaked through the pads of the Minnesota netminder for BU's first of the game. The lucky break caused the floodgates to open in the second period and BU scored three times. A third Minnesota goal left BU with a one-goal lead but they managed to defend their advantage well in the third. Both teams had chances in the final period but neither was able to score until Minnesota pulled their goaltender. BU collected two empty-net goals in the final two minutes to take the game and made the frozen four for the second year in a row.

Luke Tuch opened the scoring with a short-handed marker in the first. Denver continued its unexpected run of strong defense to limit the Terriers afterwards; however, that was a sideshow for the main feature of the game. The Terriers never got a single power play in the game while Denver went on the man-advantage four separate times. Several times in the match, obvious infractions by the Pioneers were missed and each provoked increasingly loud groans from the crowd. Towards the end of the game, head coach Jay Pandolfo was so irate with the officials that he could be heard screaming on the telecast. The only thing that kept BU in the game was a sensational game from Caron that saw the goaltender make multiple miraculous saves. BU had several chances to score both in regulation and overtime but they could not get a second goal into the Denver cage. Eventually, the team's luck ran out and a hard shot from the right circle slipped through Caron's legs for the winning goal.

== Departures ==
Player	Position	Nationality	Cause
Jamie Armstrong	Forward	Canada	Graduate transfer to Boston College
Matt Brown	Forward	United States	Graduation (signed with Lehigh Valley Phantoms)
Brian Carrabes	Forward	United States	Transferred to Minnesota State
Drew Commesso	Goaltender	United States	Signed professional contract (Chicago Blackhawks)
John Copeland	Defenseman/Forward	United States	Graduation (signed with Worcester Railers)
Sean Driscoll	Defenseman	United States	Graduation (retired)
Vinny Duplessis	Goaltender	Canada	Transferred to Quinnipiac
Domenick Fensore	Defenseman	United States	Graduation (signed with Carolina Hurricanes)
Lachlan Getz	Defenseman	United States	Transferred to Michigan Tech
Jay O'Brien	Forward	United States	Graduation (signed with Toronto Marlies)
Ethan Phillips	Forward	United States	Graduate transfer to Western Michigan
Patrick Schena	Goaltender	United States	Graduation (retired)
Wilmer Skoog	Forward	Sweden	Graduation (signed with Charlotte Checkers)

== Recruiting ==
Player	Position	Nationality	Age	Notes
Mathieu Caron	Goaltender	Canada	23	Abbotsford, BC; transfer from Brown
Aiden Celebrini	Defenseman	Canada	18	Vancouver, BC; selected 171st overall in 2023
Macklin Celebrini	Forward	Canada	17	Vancouver, BC
Mick Frechette	Defenseman	United States	19	Weston, MA
Jack Gorton	Forward	United States	21	Granite Springs, NY
Henry Graham	Goaltender	United States	23	Manhattan, NY; transfer from Massachusetts
Doug Grimes	Forward	United States	21	Brookline, MA
Jack Harvey	Forward	United States	20	Stacy, MN; selected 193rd overall in 2023
Nick Howard	Goaltender	United States	25	Burlington, MA; transfer from Saint Anselm
Jack Hughes	Forward	United States	19	Westwood, MA; transfer from Northeastern; selected 51st overall in 2022
Shane Lachance	Forward	United States	20	Burlington, MA; selected 186th overall in 2021
Max Lacroix	Goaltender	United States	19	Castle Pines, CO; joined mid-season
Gavin McCarthy	Defenseman	United States	18	Clarence Center, NY; selected 86th overall in 2023
Tom Willander	Defenseman	Sweden	18	Stockholm, SWE; selected 11th overall in 2023

== Roster ==
As of September 21, 2023.

No.	Nat.	Player	Class	Pos	Height	Weight	DoB	Hometown	Previous team	NHL rights
2	(United States)	Gavin McCarthy	Freshman	D	6' 1" (1.85 m)	185 lb (84 kg)	2005-06-02	Clarence Center, New York	Muskegon Lumberjacks (USHL)	BUF, 86th overall 2023
3	(United States)	Tristan Amonte	Junior	F	6' 0" (1.83 m)	177 lb (80 kg)	2000-02-01	Norwell, Massachusetts	Penticton Vees (BCHL)	—
4	(United States)	Ty Gallagher	Junior	D	6' 0" (1.83 m)	190 lb (86 kg)	2003-03-06	Clarkston, Michigan	USNTDP (USHL)	BOS, 217th overall 2021
5	(Sweden)	Tom Willander	Freshman	D	6' 1" (1.85 m)	179 lb (81 kg)	2005-02-09	Stockholm, Sweden	Rögle BK (SHL)	VAN, 11th overall 2023
7	(United States)	Case McCarthy (C)	Graduate	D	6' 1" (1.85 m)	202 lb (92 kg)	2001-01-09	Clarence Center, New York	USNTDP (USHL)	NJD, 118th overall 2019
8	(United States)	Cade Webber (A)	Senior	D	6' 7" (2.01 m)	215 lb (98 kg)	2001-01-05	Meadville, Pennsylvania	Penticton Vees (BCHL)	CAR, 99th overall 2019
9	(Canada)	Ryan Greene	Sophomore	F	6' 1" (1.85 m)	180 lb (82 kg)	2003-10-21	Paradise, Newfoundland and Labrador	Green Bay Gamblers (USHL)	CHI, 57th overall 2022
10	(Canada)	Nick Zabaneh	Senior	F	5' 10" (1.78 m)	188 lb (85 kg)	2001-03-27	Toronto, Ontario	Green Bay Gamblers (USHL)	—
11	(United States)	Luke Tuch (A)	Senior	F	6' 2" (1.88 m)	210 lb (95 kg)	2002-03-07	Baldwinsville, New York	USNTDP (USHL)	MTL, 47th overall 2020
12	(United States)	Jack Harvey	Freshman	F	5' 10" (1.78 m)	176 lb (80 kg)	2003-03-31	Stacy, Minnesota	Chicago Steel (USHL)	TBL, 193rd overall 2023
13	(United States)	Dylan Peterson	Senior	F	6' 4" (1.93 m)	203 lb (92 kg)	2002-01-08	Roseville, California	USNTDP (USHL)	STL, 86th overall 2020
14	(United States)	Mick Frechette	Freshman	D	6' 2" (1.88 m)	205 lb (93 kg)	2003-10-27	Weston, Massachusetts	Dexter Southfield School (USHS–MA)	—
15	(United States)	Lachlan Getz	Sophomore	D	6' 3" (1.91 m)	190 lb (86 kg)	2002-02-01	Northfield, Illinois	Chilliwack Chiefs (BCHL)	—
16	(United States)	Jeremy Wilmer	Sophomore	F	5' 8" (1.73 m)	155 lb (70 kg)	2003-08-16	Rockville Centre, New York	Tri-City Storm (USHL)	—
17	(United States)	Quinn Hutson	Sophomore	F	5' 10" (1.78 m)	170 lb (77 kg)	2002-01-01	North Barrington, Illinois	Muskegon Lumberjacks (USHL)	—
18	(United States)	Shane Lachance	Freshman	F	6' 5" (1.96 m)	218 lb (99 kg)	2003-08-30	Andover, Massachusetts	Youngstown Phantoms (USHL)	EDM, 186th overall 2021
19	(United States)	Jack Page	Junior	D	6' 4" (1.93 m)	194 lb (88 kg)	2001-11-27	West Chester, Pennsylvania	Rockets Hockey Club (NCDC)	—
20	(United States)	Lane Hutson (A)	Sophomore	D	5' 9" (1.75 m)	155 lb (70 kg)	2004-02-14	North Barrington, Illinois	USNTDP (USHL)	MTL, 62nd overall 2022
21	(United States)	Devin Kaplan	Sophomore	F	6' 3" (1.91 m)	204 lb (93 kg)	2004-01-10	Bridgewater, New Jersey	USNTDP (USHL)	PHI, 69th overall 2022
22	(Canada)	Aiden Celebrini	Freshman	F	6' 1" (1.85 m)	195 lb (88 kg)	2004-10-26	Vancouver, British Columbia	Brooks Bandits (AJHL)	VAN, 171st overall 2023
23	(United States)	Doug Grimes	Freshman	F	6' 3" (1.91 m)	205 lb (93 kg)	2002-04-18	Brookline, Massachusetts	Lincoln Stars (USHL)	—
25	(Canada)	Sam Stevens (A)	Graduate	F	6' 1" (1.85 m)	186 lb (84 kg)	2000-04-27	Montreal, Quebec	Sioux Falls Stampede (USHL)	—
26	(United States)	Jack Gorton	Freshman	F	6' 3" (1.91 m)	200 lb (91 kg)	2002-02-13	Granite Springs, New York	Victoria Grizzlies (BCHL)	—
27	(United States)	Jack Hughes	Junior	F	6' 0" (1.83 m)	165 lb (75 kg)	2003-11-02	Westwood, Massachusetts	Northeastern (HEA)	LAK, 51st overall 2022
28	(United States)	Thomas Jarman	Senior	D	6' 3" (1.91 m)	190 lb (86 kg)	2001-04-09	Gibsonia, Pennsylvania	Maryland Black Bears (NAHL)	—
29	(United States)	Nick Howard	Graduate	G	6' 0" (1.83 m)	210 lb (95 kg)	1998-02-01	Burlington, Massachusetts	Saint Anselm (NE–10)	—
30	(United States)	Henry Graham	Senior	G	6' 0" (1.83 m)	181 lb (82 kg)	2000-07-25	Manhattan, New York	Massachusetts (HEA)	—
33	(United States)	Max Lacroix	Freshman	G	6' 0" (1.83 m)	170 lb (77 kg)	2003-12-13	Castle Pines, Colorado	Colorado Grit (NAHL)	—
62	(Canada)	Mathieu Caron	Junior	G	6' 0" (1.83 m)	190 lb (86 kg)	2000-03-29	Abbotsford, British Columbia	Brown (ECAC)	—
71	(Canada)	Macklin Celebrini	Freshman	F	6' 0" (1.83 m)	190 lb (86 kg)	2006-06-13	Vancouver, British Columbia	Chicago Steel (USHL)	—

== Standings ==
2023–24 Hockey East Standings
	Conference record										Overall record					
	GP	W	L	T	OTW	OTL	SW	PTS	GF	GA	GP	W	L	T	GF	GA
#2 Boston College †*	24	20	3	1	1	0	1	61	105	56	41	34	6	1	183	89
#3 Boston University	24	18	4	2	1	1	1	57	104	53	40	28	10	2	163	97
#10 Maine	24	14	9	1	0	1	0	44	76	67	37	23	12	2	119	94
#16 Providence	24	11	9	4	3	1	2	37	66	58	35	18	13	4	100	83
#13 Massachusetts	24	12	10	2	4	2	0	36	57	62	37	20	14	3	108	105
#20 New Hampshire	24	12	11	1	1	0	0	36	69	56	36	20	15	1	106	90
Northeastern	24	9	14	1	1	3	0	30	65	71	36	17	16	3	113	97
Connecticut	24	9	14	1	1	1	1	29	49	77	36	15	19	2	90	105
Vermont	24	7	14	3	1	0	3	26	52	81	35	13	19	3	87	106
Merrimack	24	6	17	1	0	1	1	21	62	85	35	13	21	1	98	114
Massachusetts Lowell	24	4	17	3	1	4	0	18	39	78	36	8	24	4	72	113
Championship: March 23, 2024 † indicates regular season champion * indicates conference tournament champion (Lamoriello Trophy); Rankings: USCHO Division I Men's Poll

== Schedule and results ==
Date	Time	Opponent^{#}	Rank^{#}	Site	TV	Decision	Result	Attendance	Record
Regular season
October 7	7:05 p.m.	at Bentley*	#1	Bentley Arena • Waltham, Massachusetts	FloHockey	Caron	W 3–2 ^{OT}	2,200	1–0–0
October 13	7:00 p.m.	at New Hampshire	#1	Whittemore Center • Durham, New Hampshire	ESPN+, NESN	Caron	L 4–6	6,070	1–1–0 (0–1–0)
October 14	7:00 p.m.	at USNTDP*	#1	Agganis Arena • Boston, Massachusetts (Exhibition)	ESPN+	Graham	L 2–8	4,815	
October 20	7:00 p.m.	at Notre Dame*	#6	Compton Family Ice Arena • Notre Dame, Indiana	Peacock	Caron	L 1–4	4,387	1–2–0
October 21	6:00 p.m.	at Notre Dame*	#6	Compton Family Ice Arena • Notre Dame, Indiana	Peacock	Caron	W 8–2	4,508	2–2–0
October 27	7:00 p.m.	#19 Massachusetts	#9	Agganis Arena • Boston, Massachusetts	ESPN+	Caron	W 5–2	5,172	3–2–0 (1–1–0)
October 28	7:00 p.m.	at #19 Massachusetts	#9	Mullins Center • Amherst, Massachusetts	ESPN+	Caron	T 3–3 ^{SOW}	4,589	3–2–1 (1–1–1)
November 3	7:00 p.m.	#3 North Dakota*	#9	Agganis Arena • Boston, Massachusetts	ESPN+	Caron	W 3–2	4,390	4–2–1
November 4	7:00 p.m.	#3 North Dakota*	#9	Agganis Arena • Boston, Massachusetts	ESPN+	Caron	L 4–5 ^{OT}	4,968	4–3–1
November 10	7:15 p.m.	at Massachusetts Lowell	#9	Tsongas Center • Lowell, Massachusetts	ESPN+	Caron	W 3–2	5,748	5–3–1 (2–1–1)
November 11	7:00 p.m.	Massachusetts Lowell	#9	Agganis Arena • Boston, Massachusetts	ESPN+	Caron	W 6–1	4,819	6–3–1 (3–1–1)
November 17	7:00 p.m.	#9 Maine	#8	Agganis Arena • Boston, Massachusetts (Rivalry)	ESPN+, NESN	Caron	W 3–2	4,393	7–3–1 (4–1–1)
November 18	6:00 p.m.	#9 Maine	#8	Agganis Arena • Boston, Massachusetts (Rivalry)	ESPN+	Caron	W 5–4	5,858	8–3–1 (5–1–1)
November 22	5:00 p.m.	#3 Quinnipiac*	#5	Agganis Arena • Boston, Massachusetts	ESPN+	Caron	W 3–2	5,296	9–3–1
November 25	8:00 p.m.	vs. #16 Cornell*	#5	Madison Square Garden • New York, New York (Red Hot Hockey)	ESPN+	Caron	L 1–2	15,289	9–4–1
December 1	7:30 p.m.	at Merrimack	#4	J. Thom Lawler Rink • North Andover, Massachusetts	ESPN+	Caron	W 4–1	2,734	10–4–1 (6–1–1)
December 2	6:00 p.m.	Merrimack	#4	Agganis Arena • Boston, Massachusetts	ESPN+	Caron	W 5–2	5,747	11–4–1 (7–1–1)
December 29	7:00 p.m.	at Yale*	#2	Ingalls Rink • New Haven, Connecticut	ESPN+	Caron	W 6–1	2,871	12–4–1
January 5	7:00 p.m.	Simon Fraser*	#2	Agganis Arena • Boston, Massachusetts (Exhibition)	ESPN+	Lacroix	T 1–1 ^{SOW}	2,701	
January 9	7:00 p.m.	Northeastern	#2	Agganis Arena • Boston, Massachusetts	ESPN+	Caron	W 4–3 ^{OT}	4,248	13–4–1 (8–1–1)
January 13	7:00 p.m.	#16 New Hampshire	#2	Agganis Arena • Boston, Massachusetts	ESPN+	Caron	W 3–0	5,359	14–4–1 (9–1–1)
January 19	7:00 p.m.	at Vermont	#1	Gutterson Fieldhouse • Burlington, Vermont	ESPN+	Caron	W 5–1	3,640	15–4–1 (10–1–1)
January 20	7:00 p.m.	at Vermont	#1	Gutterson Fieldhouse • Burlington, Vermont	ESPN+	Caron	W 5–2	3,486	16–4–1 (11–1–1)
January 26	7:00 p.m.	at #2 Boston College	#1	Conte Forum • Chestnut Hill, Massachusetts (Rivalry)	NESN, ESPN+, TSN2	Caron	L 1–4	7,884	16–5–1 (11–2–1)
January 27	7:00 p.m.	#2 Boston College	#1	Agganis Arena • Boston, Massachusetts (Rivalry)	NESN, ESPN+	Caron	L 3–4	6,150	16–6–1 (11–3–1)
January 30	6:30 p.m.	at Northeastern	#3	Matthews Arena • Boston, Massachusetts	ESPNU, TSN	Caron	L 3–4 ^{OT}	4,009	16–7–1 (11–4–1)
February 2	7:00 p.m.	at #18 New Hampshire	#3	Whittemore Center • Durham, New Hampshire	ESPN+	Caron	W 6–3	6,501	17–7–1 (12–4–1)
Beanpot
February 5	8:00 p.m.	vs. #1 Boston College*	#3	TD Garden • Boston, Massachusetts (Beanpot Semifinal, Rivalry)	NESN	Caron	W 4–3	17,850	18–7–1
February 9	7:00 p.m.	Merrimack	#3	Agganis Arena • Boston, Massachusetts	NESN, ESPN+	Caron	W 7–1	5,404	19–7–1 (13–4–1)
February 12	7:30 p.m.	vs. Northeastern*	#3	TD Garden • Boston, Massachusetts (Beanpot Championship Game)	NESN, TSN3, TSN5	Caron	L 3–4 ^{OT}	—	19–8–1
February 16	7:00 p.m.	at #10 Providence	#3	Schneider Arena • Providence, Rhode Island	ESPN+	Caron	T 2–2 ^{SOL}	2,865	19–8–2 (13–4–2)
February 17	7:00 p.m.	#10 Providence	#3	Agganis Arena • Boston, Massachusetts	ESPN+	Caron	W 5–2	5,856	20–8–2 (14–4–2)
February 23	7:00 p.m.	at Connecticut	#2	Toscano Family Ice Forum • Storrs, Connecticut	ESPN+	Caron	W 6–1	2,691	21–8–2 (15–4–2)
February 24	7:00 p.m.	Connecticut	#2	Agganis Arena • Boston, Massachusetts	ESPN+	Caron	W 6–0	5,857	22–8–2 (16–4–2)
March 7	7:00 p.m.	at #11 Providence	#2	Schneider Arena • Providence, Rhode Island	ESPN+	Caron	W 4–2	2,498	23–8–2 (17–4–2)
March 9	4:00 p.m.	Vermont	#2	Agganis Arena • Boston, Massachusetts	ESPN+	Caron	W 6–1	5,597	24–8–2 (18–4–2)
Hockey East Tournament
March 16	7:30 p.m.	Northeastern*	#2	Agganis Arena • Boston, Massachusetts (Quarterfinal)	ESPN+	Caron	W 4–2	5,455	25–8–2
March 22	7:30 p.m.	vs. #7 Maine*	#2	TD Garden • Boston, Massachusetts (Semifinal, Rivalry)	ESPN+, NESN	Caron	W 4–1	17,850	26–8–2
March 23	7:30 p.m.	vs. #1 Boston College*	#2	TD Garden • Boston, Massachusetts (Championship, Rivalry)	ESPN+, NESN	Caron	L 2–6	17,850	26–9–2
NCAA Tournament
March 28	5:00 p.m.	vs. #17 RIT*	#2	Denny Sanford PREMIER Center • Sioux Falls, South Dakota (West Regional Semifinal)	ESPNU	Caron	W 6–3	5,691	27–9–2
March 30	5:30 p.m.	vs. #7 Minnesota*	#2	Denny Sanford PREMIER Center • Sioux Falls, South Dakota (West Regional Final)	ESPNU	Caron	W 6–3	6,113	28–9–2
April 11	5:00 p.m.	vs. #3 Denver*	#2	Xcel Energy Center • St. Paul, Minnesota (National Semifinal)	ESPN2	Caron	L 1–2 ^{OT}		28–10–2
*Non-conference game. ^{#}Rankings from USCHO.com Poll. All times are in Eastern Time. Source:

== NCAA tournament ==
=== Regional semifinal ===
March 28, 2024; 4:00 p.m.	(1) Boston University	6–3 (2–1, 2–1, 2–1)	(4) RIT	Denny Sanford Premier Center; Attendance: 5,691

Game reference

Mathieu Caron
Goalies
Tommy Scarfone
Referees:
Bruce Vida
Brady Johnson
Linesmen:
Tyler Landman
Nathan Voll

(M. Celebrini, Kaplan) Lane Hutson (14) – 11:56	1–0
(unassisted) Ryan Greene (12) – 13:01	2–0
	2–1	15:40 – PP – Elijah Gonsalves (20) (Wilde, Cassaro)
(L. Hutson, Kaplan) Sam Stevens (9) – 28:16	3–1
	3–2	35:20 – Gianfranco Cassaro (18) (Nicholson)
(Peterson, Zabaneh) Macklin Celebrini (32) – GW – 37:01	4–2
(Lachance, Willander) Jack Harvey (6) – 41:29	5–2
(Willander, Zabaneh) Dylan Peterson (8) – EN – 55:46	6–2
	6–3	59:03 – Cody Laskosky (4) (Catalano, Blom)

6 min
Penalties
6 min
33
Shots
31

=== Regional final ===
March 30, 2024; 5:30 p.m.	(1) Boston University	6–3 (1–2, 3–1, 2–0)	(2) Minnesota	Denny Sanford Premier Center; Attendance: 6,113

Game reference

Mathieu Caron
Goalies
Justen Close
Referees:
Cameron Lynch
Jason Williams
Linesmen:
Steve Drain
John Rey

	0–1	7:19 – Jaxon Nelson (19) (Brodzinski, Rinzel)
	0–2	17:47 – Bryce Brodzinski (14) (Pitlick)
(unassisted) Quinn Hutson (18) – 18:01	1–2
(M. Celebrini, Harvey) Shane Lachance (13) – 21:17	2–2
(M. Celebrini, Lachance) Jack Harvey (7) – 25:25	3–2
	3–3	29:20 – Aaron Huglen (14) (Lamb, L. Mittelstadt)
(Peterson, C. McCarthy) Lane Hutson (15) – GW – 35:36	4–3
(Willander) Case McCarthy (4) – EN – 58:15	5–3
(M. Celebrini) Sam Stevens (10) – EN – 59:28	6–3

0 min
Penalties
0 min
38
Shots
28

Game summary
Boston University began the game on offense, getting several shots on Justen Close in the first few minutes. Minnesota's defense kept the Terriers from getting a great chance for a goal and then started matching BU's effort level. After several near-misses, the Gophers finally got their first shot just before the five-minute mark. Shortly afterwards, Boston University set up for an extended period in the offensive zone and had several scoring chances but Close kept the game scoreless. Minnesota responded with an attack of their own and Jaxon Nelson twisted his body to fire a sharp-angle shot into the far corner of the goal for the opening score. The pace slowed down afterwards and little occurred over the next several minutes. Coming out of the TV timeout, Minnesota won a defensive zone faceoff and moved the puck up the ice. BU was first on the rubber but they turned the puck over and the Gophers got two great shots on goal. A minute later, the Terriers got their own high-percentage shot after a turnover but Sam Stevens could not get the puck into the goal. The near-miss appeared to reawaken Boston University and the Terriers got back to the same pace they had at the start of the period. The Gopher defense soon recovered and shut down a pair of Terrier rushes. Near the end of the period, Aaron Huglen forced Case McCarthy into a turnover along the wall. The puck was quickly moved to Bryce Brodzinski who shot the puck past Mathieu Caron's glove. After the ensuing faceoff, Quinn Hutson brought puck up the right side into the Minnesota zone and directed the puck towards the Gopher cage. The slow-motion puck seemed to catch Close off-guard and somehow slipped beneath the netminder's pad and was directed into the goal. The Gophers attacked after the fluky goal and were nearly able to regain their two-goal edge but Caron made several saves to keep his team within one.

After the start of the second, BU wasted little time in getting to the offense. Macklin Celebrini grabbed the puck at the Minnesota blueline and skated to the right faceoff circle. He wheeled around a found a wide-open Shane Lachance at the left circle for a one-timer. Meanwhile, a Minnesota player ended up sliding into Justen Close and prevented the goaltender from getting into position. This allowed the shot from Lachance to easily sail into the net for the tying goal. The Terriers kept the pressure on and, four minutes later, Celebrini made another pass from the right side of the Gopher cage that ended up in the back of the net, this time to Jack Harvey. BU completely dominated the first seven minutes of the period but Minnesota finally got back into the game in the middle of the period. During an extended stay in the Terriers' end, Caron was forced to made several grade-A saves. The Gophers were able to make a line change and keep the pressure until a shot from Brody Lamb from the right circle. After sliding to his left, Caron was out of the crease as the puck settled in the blue paint. Aaron Huglen found the biscuit at his feet and was able to slap it into the net. In the second half of the period, Jaxon Nelson got a clean break in on the BU cage. While Caron made the save, the puck stayed with Minnesota and the Terrier netminder was forced to make several more stops. BU slowly got back to their game afterwards and continued the see-saw nature of the game. With less than five minutes in the period, Lane Hutson got the puck inside the Minnesota blueline and, after evading a Minnesota defender, skated in an arc down the left side and fired the puck towards the goal. He was apparently trying to find Sam Stevens, who was set up in the goal crease, but the puck hit Close in the left pad and was redirected into the goal. Minnesota took over in the waning minutes and got a good chance on goal but Caron made the save.

Minnesota took the initiative at the start of the third and Nelson had a chance to tie the score just 30 seconds in. BU evened out play afterwards and the two teams exchanged scoring chances. Neither team was able to establish a presence in the offensive zone for any length of time, however, and both teams were limited to end-to-end rushes. The Terriers finally got set up near the middle of the period but the Gopher defense kept them mostly to the outside. Minnesota counterattacked and got a few chances of their own but they too were checked closely by Boston University. In the later half of the period, Macklin Celebrini made a third miraculous pass from the right side but this time the shot was stopped by Close. As the play continued, the puck came back to Celebrini but the teenager caught an edge and Minnesota broke up the ice on a 2-on-1. Nelson passed the puck to Ryan Chesley but he fanned on the shot. About a minute later, Hughes got the puck near the Minnesota goal line and had a partially open net to shoot at but he could not overcome the steep angle. Both teams remained on an offensive footing and scoring chances were coming from all quarters. After BU iced the puck with about two minutes to play, Close was pulled for an extra attacker. Minnesota could not get set up in the offensive zone and after their second attempt, Case McCarthy cleared the puck 200 feet into the Minnesota cage for a two-goal lead. With no other option, Close was pulled again and minute later, Macklin Celebrini chipped the puck out of the zone to Sam Stevens and the second empty-net goal sealed the win for BU.

=== National semifinal ===
April 11, 2024; 4:00 p.m.	(W1) Boston University	1–2 (OT) (1–0, 0–1, 0–0, 0–1)	(NE1) Denver	Xcel Energy Center; Attendance: 18,598

Game reference

Mathieu Caron
Goalies
Matt Davis
Referees:
Colin Kronforst
Andrew Bruggeman
Linesmen:
Samuel Shikowsky
Tommy George

(G. McCarthy) Luke Tuch (10) – SH – 7:45	1–0
	1–1	35:21 – Tristan Lemyre (2) (Matikka)
	1–2	71:09 – GW – Tristan Broz (16) (Behrens)

10 min
Penalties
2 min
34
Shots
29

Game summary
In the first minute of play, Macklin Celebrini found himself alone in front of the net but Matt Davis managed to make the save. BU continued to apply pressure and threaten the Denver cage in the early minutes but the Denver defense held them off. The Pioneers attempted to counterattack but the Terriers used their live legs to backcheck effectively. Denver did not get a shot on goal until after the 5-minute mark but when the did they got a great chance off of the rebound. Fortunately for BU, Mathieu Caron was able match his counterpart and stop the puck. After the ensuing faceoff, Nick Zabaneh was called for high-sticking and gave Denver the game's first power play. The Pioneers generated several chances but, as the penalty was winding down, Luke Tuch took advantage of a the puck bouncing off of Jack Devine's skate and got a breakaway from center ice. He fired a shot into the top corner from the left circle for the game's opening goal. The pace of the game remained fast and, despite the puck spending much of its time in the Denver end, shots on goal were at a premium. In the latter half of the first, the two teams spent much of their time counterpunching. The Denver defense continued to stand strong and a hit by Sean Behrens on Celebrini with about 5 minutes to play looked to possibly be a hit to the head; however, during the next stoppage, Jay Pandolfo did not ask for a challenge before the faceoff. Boston University remained in control for much of the final few minutes. With under two to play, Sam Stevens deflected a shot on goal that nearly scored but the puck dribbled wide.

Denver started the second with a greater emphasis on their forecheck but the Terriers still remained on the attack. Celebrini got another great scoring chance about 2 minutes into the second and he tried to bunt a fluttering puck into a half open cage but it hopped wide. The Pioneers continued to struggle against the omnipresent attack from BU and were restricted to getting what little offense they could from the outside. The only thing keeping Denver in the game in the first 30 minutes of the match was their stalwart defense BU's offense kept firing shots on Davis whether it be open looks, bombs from the point, or passes across the front of the net but Davis was in place to keep his team in the game. In the back half of the second Denver was finally able to establish some zone time and after turning over the puck behind the BU cage, Miko Matikka found Tristan Lemyre for a shot that leaked through Caron to tie the score. Jared Wright nearly gave Denver the lead just seconds later when the puck bounced to him in front of the cage but Caron managed to close his five-hole in time. A minute later, Tuch pasted Devine into the board with a hard check. Shortly thereafter, Tom Willander was apparently tripped but no call was made and it was apparent that the referees had swallowed their whistles. With under 30 seconds to play, Denver got a surprise rush up the ice and Aidan Thompson got a glorious scoring chance when he beat Caron with a deke but the BU goaltender made a desperate save with his glove right in front of the goal line.

Both teams got their chances at the start of the third but neither could get the puck to cooperate. At about the 3-minute mark, Willander was given a tripping minor to give Denver its second per play chance. The Pioneers got several chances and were nearly able to score near the end from a scramble in front of the net but the Terriers defenders just managed to keep the puck out of the net. BU started to take over near the middle of the period but their momentum was arrested when Jack Harvey was whistled for a trip. The penalty was bad enough but made all the worse because just seconds before a potential boarding penalty on Denver went uncalled. The third chance for Denver was a bit more deliberate and the Pioneers did not seem as focused as they had been on the previous two. Just as the penalty expired, Jack Devine found a loose puck and had a yawning cage as Caron had slid out of position but, for the second time in the game, the glove hand reached back and snatched the puck as it was sliding towards a sure goal. Afterwards both offenses struggled to find any kind of consistency and neither team seemed able to hold onto the puck. With under 4 minutes to play, Celebrini found Harvey alone in front of the net for a one-timer but the puck hit the post as stayed out. About 30 seconds later, Lane Hutson was tripped by a Denver play but, yet again, the referees refused to call a penalty on Denver. Chances continued to come fast and Denver had a chance off of a rush with 2 minutes to play but Caron made the save. With under 90 seconds to play, Dylan Peterson layed a hard check on Behrens on the forecheck and the defender was buried into the boards. Peterson got 2 minutes for boarding to give Denver its fourth power play of the game. Boston University pulled in tight and held the fort to keep the Pioneers mostly to the outside and they were able to bleed the clock down and force overtime.

The Terriers opened overtime by killing off the remainder of the penalty and then immediately getting back on offense. Denver counterattacked and nearly found the net from a Thompson backhander but he did not quite have the angle. After 3 minutes, a scrum in front of the BU cage resulted in penalties on both teams and created a 4-on-4. With open ice, the Terriers carried the balance of play and Hutson made a brilliant play at the blueline to get in close but could not get the puck past Davis. Caron was forced to make a pair of saves afterwards to save his squad and play returned to normal. Afterwards, Sam Stevens injured his knee on what was likely a tripping penalty and, despite the puck not being in the offensive zone, the officials did not blow the play dead to provide assistance to the downed player. Even though they could not buy a call, the Terriers continued to press and a hard one-timer from Celebrini just barely missed the net. Just before the midway point of the period. A slash by Denver was again not called by the officials, leaving coach Pandolfo nearly apoplectic on the bench. About a minute later, Tristan Broz skated into the BU end and fired a shot from the right circle, it went right between Caron's legs for the winning goal.

== Scoring statistics ==
Name	Position	Games	Goals	Assists	Points	PIM
Macklin Celebrini	C	38	32	32	64	18
Lane Hutson	D	38	15	34	49	24
Quinn Hutson	RW	40	18	18	36	35
Ryan Greene	C	40	12	24	36	6
Jeremy Wilmer	LW	38	6	30	36	19
Luke Tuch	LW	39	10	20	30	10
Shane Lachance	LW	40	13	14	27	12
Tom Willander	D	38	4	21	25	12
Devin Kaplan	RW	37	5	18	23	34
Dylan Peterson	C	35	8	12	20	73
Jack Hughes	C	38	7	12	19	12
Sam Stevens	F	40	10	7	17	34
Nicholas Zabaneh	C	40	8	8	16	36
Jack Harvey	F	20	7	8	15	4
Case McCarthy	D	39	4	5	9	10
Aiden Celebrini	D	36	1	5	6	20
Cade Webber	D	38	0	6	6	30
Gavin McCarthy	D	38	1	4	5	41
Ty Gallagher	D	37	0	5	5	14
Doug Grimes	RW	23	2	1	3	2
Mick Frechette	D	7	0	2	2	2
Nick Howard	G	1	0	0	0	0
Max Lacroix	G	1	0	0	0	0
Thomas Jarman	D	1	0	0	0	0
Henry Graham	G	2	0	0	0	0
Tristan Amonte	F	8	0	0	0	0
Mathieu Caron	G	40	0	0	0	2
Total			163	285	448	460

== Goaltending statistics ==
Name	Games	Minutes	Wins	Losses	Ties	Goals against	Saves	Shut outs	SV %	GAA
Nick Howard	1	0:06	0	0	0	0	0	0	-	0.00
Henry Graham	2	5:16	0	0	0	0	2	0	1.000	0.00
Max Lacroix	2	11:12	0	0	0	0	6	0	1.000	0.00
Mathieu Caron	40	2402:25	28	10	2	94	1017	2	.915	2.35
Empty Net	-	15:57	-	-	-	3	-	-	-	-
Total	40	2434:56	28	10	2	97	1025	2	.914	2.39

== Rankings ==
Poll	Week																										
Poll	Pre	1	2	3	4	5	6	7	8	9	10	11	12	13	14	15	16	17	18	19	20	21	22	23	24	25	26 (Final)
USCHO.com	1 (17)	1 (26)	6 (1)	9	9	9	8	5 (1)	4	2т (8)	2 (8)	–	2 (9)	2 (3)	1 (12)	1 (40)	3	3	3 (11)	2	2	2	2	2	2	–	3
USA Hockey	1 (16)	2 (16)	6 (1)	9	8	8	8	5	5	2 (6)	2 (7)	2 (5)	–	2 (3)	1 (27)	1 (25)	3	3	3 (2)	2	2	2	2	2	2	2	3

Note: USCHO did not release a poll in weeks 11 and 25.
Note: USA Hockey did not release a poll in week 12.

== Awards and honors ==
Player	Award	Ref
Macklin Celebrini	Hobey Baker Award	
Macklin Celebrini	Tim Taylor Award	
Lane Hutson	AHCA East First Team All-American	
Macklin Celebrini	AHCA East First Team All-American	
Macklin Celebrini	Hockey East Player of the Year	
Cade Webber	Hockey East Best Defensive Defenseman	
Macklin Celebrini	Hockey East Rookie of the Year	
Macklin Celebrini	Hockey East Three-Stars Award	
Macklin Celebrini	Hockey East Scoring Champion	
Lane Hutson	Hockey East First Team	
Macklin Celebrini	Hockey East First Team	
Tom Willander	Hockey East Second Team	
Mathieu Caron	Hockey East Third Team	
Macklin Celebrini	Hockey East Rookie Team	
Lane Hutson	Hockey East All-Tournament Team	
Macklin Celebrini	Hockey East All-Tournament Team	

== 2024 NHL entry draft ==
Round	Pick	Player	NHL team
1	1	Macklin Celebrini	San Jose Sharks
1	20	Cole Eiserman ^{†}	New York Islanders
2	43	Cole Hutson ^{†}	Washington Capitals
2	49	Mikhail Yegorov ^{†}	New Jersey Devils
2	61	Kamil Bednarik ^{†}	New York Islanders
3	92	Jack Pridham ^{†}	Chicago Blackhawks

† incoming freshman
