= 2023–24 UMass Minutemen ice hockey season =

NCAA Tournament, Regional Semifinal
- Conference: T–5th Hockey East
- Home ice: Mullins Center

Rankings
- USCHO: #13
- USA Hockey: #12

Record
- Overall: 20–14–3
- Conference: 12–10–2
- Home: 10–4–2
- Road: 10–7–0
- Neutral: 0–2–1

Coaches and captains
- Head coach: Greg Carvel
- Assistant coaches: Tom Upton; Nolan Gluchowski
- Captain(s): Ryan Ufko; Aaron Bohlinger

The 2023–24 UMass Minutemen ice hockey season was the 92nd season of play for the program, the 31st at the Division I level, and 30th in Hockey East. The Minutemen represented the University of Massachusetts Amherst in the 2023–24 NCAA Division I men's ice hockey season, played their home games at Mullins Center and were coached by Greg Carvel in his 8th season.

== Season ==
With about half of the team being made up of new players, UMass entered the season as a relative unknown by the general public. While most of the defense returned, headed by Ryan Ufko and Scott Morrow, both the goaltenders and forward units had been completely revamped. With so much unknown about the Minutemen, the team was unranked coming into the season but the swiftly made their mark on the year.

Cole Brady, the only returning netminder, got the start in the first two games. However, after surrendering 7 goals to Michigan, top prospect Michael Hrabal was swapped in and the team never looked back. Hrabal provided an instant boost and allowed the Minutemen to earn a split with the Wolverines. The following week, the freshman goalie did even better by backstopping Massachusetts to a sweep of Minnesota State, earning his first career shutout in the process. Part of the reason Hrabal was able to get wins in his first three games was that the new additions up front were working as well. While the scoring was sparked by the blueline, Jack Musa and Aydar Suniev were proving to be key contributors on offense and both finished in the team's top five as freshmen.

UMass jumped into the national rankings by late October and proceeded to climb up the ranks until they reached the top 10 by the beginning of December. When the team returned after the winter break, Brady was back as the team starter because Hrabal was still busy helping the Czech Republic win a bronze medal at the World Junior Championships. Unfortunately for UMass, the team didn't play too well in his absence and lost three consecutive games (two in a shootout). Once Hrabal rejoined the team, he was given complete control of the net for the rest of the season and the team would need every bit of his heroics to make the NCAA tournament.

With Hockey East as one of, if not the strongest, league in the nation, the Minutemen had a sizable hurdle in front of them with their conference schedule. In January and February, the team's offense declined a bit from what it had been before the break but was fairly consistent nonetheless. Hrabal's performed well under pressure, aside from a poor showing against #1 Boston College, but the team still had to struggle to find wins. Massachusetts entered the last couple of weeks of the regular season just above the cut line for the NCAA tournament. A sweep of Massachusetts Lowell gave the team a little breathing room but a pair of 1-goal losses to Maine put the Minutemen in a very precarious position as the conference tournament began.

With UMass sitting at 15 in the PairWise, they would have to win their quarterfinal match at Providence to have any chance at a tournament berth. Hrabal ended up having a great game, stopping 27 of 28 shots while the line of Ryan Lautenbach, Taylor Makar and Lucas Mercuri provided enough offense to carry the day. As they entered their semifinal match with BC, the Minutemen had moved up to 12th and were hoping to shore up their bid with a win over the nation's top team. Lucas Mercuri got UMass on the board first but after that very little went right for Massachusetts. BC scored the next 8 goals, flattening the Minutemen as they steamrolled their way to the conference title. The match had gone so poorly for UMass that they slipped down out of the playoff race. They were in a virtual tie with Colorado College and would need a very specific set of circumstances to push them ahead of the Tigers for the last spot in the tournament. In the final day of the conference tournaments, fortune was with the Minutemen and somehow UMass finished .0004 ahead of CC.

When the tournament began, Massachusetts found itself opposite #3 Denver. Remembering their less-than satisfactory performance against the Eagles, UMass came out fighting and tried to batter Denver into submissions with body checks. For a time the ploy appeared to work but the Minutemen were unable to get any goals to show for their efforts. In the second period, a seeing-eye shot from the blueline got through several bodies and sailed past a screened Hrabal for the opening goal of the game. Several minutes later the physical play finally paid off for UMass when they forced a turnover in the offensive zone. After a couple for failed attempts, Liam Gorman scored his first goal of the season and tied the match. With an upset in their sights, Massachusetts kept the pressure on Denver by checking them at every opportunity. However, despite getting several chances themselves, the Minutemen were unable to get a second goal and the teams headed into overtime. UMass had several great chances to win the game but they were unable to find the back of the Pioneer cage. In the back half of the second overtime, a shot from the high-slot beat a screened Hrabal for the apparent winner but the goaltender had been interfered with by a Denver attacker. Upon review, the referees determined that a Massachusetts player had pushed the Pioneer into Hrabal and allowed the goal to stand.

While the ending was bittersweet, UMass had managed to take the eventual national champions to the very limit and proved to be worthy of their berth in the tournament. The national voters indicated as much as UMass rose to 12th in the USA Hockey poll in spite of the loss.

== Departures ==
Player	Position	Nationality	Cause
Mikey Adamson	Defenseman	United States	Transferred to Sacred Heart
Tyson Dyck	Forward	Canada	Transferred to Wisconsin
Noah Ellis	Defenseman	United States	Transferred to Omaha
Eric Faith	Forward	Canada	Graduation (retired)
Henry Graham	Goaltender	United States	Transferred to Boston University
Jerry Harding	Forward	United States	Graduation (retired)
Cal Kiefiuk	Forward	United States	Graduate transfer to Providence
Matt Koopman	Forward	United States	Graduation (signed with Wheeling Nailers)
Reed Lebster	Forward	United States	Graduate transfer to Michigan State
Josh Nodler	Forward	United States	Graduate transfer to Bowling Green
Luke Pavicich	Goaltender	United States	Transferred to Massachusetts Lowell
Ryan Sullivan	Forward	United States	Transferred to Miami
Garrett Wait	Forward	United States	Graduation (retired)

== Recruiting ==
Player	Position	Nationality	Age	Notes
Bo Cosman	Forward	United States	21	Milton, GA
Liam Gorman	Forward	United States	23	Boston, MA; graduate transfer from Princeton; selected 177th overall in 2018
Michael Hrabal	Goaltender	Czech Republic	18	Prague, CZE; selected 38th overall in 2023
Jackson Irving	Goaltender	United States	19	Newbury, MA
Dans Ločmelis	Forward	Latvia	19	Jelgava, LAT; selected 119th overall in 2022
Jack Musa	Forward	United States	20	Orange Park, FL
Samuli Niinisaari	Defenseman	Finland	25	Hamina, FIN; graduate transfer from Brown
Cam O'Neill	Forward	United States	19	Odenton, MD; selected 143rd overall in 2022
Aydar Suniev	Forward	Russia	18	Kazan, RUS; selected 80th overall in 2023
Sebastian Törnqvist	Defenseman	Sweden	20	Everlöv, SWE
Nick Van Tassell	Forward	United States	19	Basking Ridge, NJ; selected 215th overall in 2023
Lucas Vanroboys	Forward	Canada	24	Thamesville, ON; graduate transfer from Bentley

== Roster ==
As of August 11, 2023.

No.	Nat.	Player	Class	Pos	Height	Weight	DoB	Hometown	Previous team	NHL rights
1	(United States)	Jackson Irving	Freshman	G	6' 0" (1.83 m)	172 lb (78 kg)	2004-02-03	Newbury, Massachusetts	Sioux Falls Stampede (USHL)	—
4	(United States)	Kennedy O'Connor	Sophomore	D	6' 2" (1.88 m)	194 lb (88 kg)	2001-05-10	Springfield, Massachusetts	Omaha Lancers (USHL)	—
5	(United States)	Linden Alger	Senior	D	6' 3" (1.91 m)	194 lb (88 kg)	2000-04-09	Centerville, Massachusetts	Youngstown Phantoms (USHL)	—
6	(United States)	Ryan Ufko (C)	Junior	D	5' 10" (1.78 m)	181 lb (82 kg)	2003-05-07	Smithtown, New York	Chicago Steel (USHL)	NSH, 115th overall 2021
7	(Finland)	Samuli Niinisaari	Graduate	D	6' 1" (1.85 m)	187 lb (85 kg)	1998-08-11	Hamina, Finland	Brown (ECAC)	—
8	(United States)	Cam O'Neill	Freshman	F	6' 0" (1.83 m)	183 lb (83 kg)	2004-01-24	Odenton, Maryland	Tri-City Storm (USHL)	OTT, 143rd overall 2022
9	(United States)	Jack Musa	Freshman	F	5' 9" (1.75 m)	157 lb (71 kg)	2003-07-22	Orange Park, Florida	Cedar Rapids RoughRiders (USHL)	—
10	(Canada)	Cole O'Hara	Sophomore	F	6' 0" (1.83 m)	183 lb (83 kg)	2002-06-20	Richmond Hill, Ontario	Tri-City Storm (USHL)	NSH, 114th overall 2022
10	(Latvia)	Dans Ločmelis	Freshman	F	6' 0" (1.83 m)	170 lb (77 kg)	2004-01-21	Jelgava, Latvia	Luleå J20 (J20 Nationell)	BOS, 119th overall 2022
11	(Canada)	Lucas Mercuri	Junior	F	6' 3" (1.91 m)	192 lb (87 kg)	2002-03-07	Montreal, Quebec	Des Moines Buccaneers (USHL)	CAR, 159th overall 2020
12	(Canada)	Lucas Vanroboys	Graduate	F	6' 2" (1.88 m)	190 lb (86 kg)	1999-07-24	Thamesville, Ontario	Bentley (AHA)	—
14	(United States)	Ryan Lautenbach	Junior	F	5' 11" (1.8 m)	175 lb (79 kg)	2000-02-27	Brighton, Michigan	Omaha Lancers (USHL)	—
16	(Russia)	Aydar Suniev	Freshman	F	6' 2" (1.88 m)	205 lb (93 kg)	2004-11-16	Kazan, Russia	Penticton Vees (BCHL)	CGY, 80th overall 2023
17	(United States)	Kenny Connors	Sophomore	F	6' 1" (1.85 m)	190 lb (86 kg)	2003-03-10	Glen Mills, Pennsylvania	Dubuque Fighting Saints (USHL)	LAK, 103rd overall 2022
18	(Canada)	Taylor Makar	Junior	F	6' 3" (1.91 m)	190 lb (86 kg)	2001-03-13	Calgary, Alberta	Brooks Bandits (AJHL)	COL, 220th overall 2021
20	(United States)	Liam Gorman	Graduate	F	6' 3" (1.91 m)	199 lb (90 kg)	2000-05-08	Arlington, Massachusetts	Princeton (ECAC)	CHI, 177th overall 2018
21	(Sweden)	Sebastian Törnqvist	Freshman	D	5' 11" (1.8 m)	187 lb (85 kg)	2003-05-22	Everlöv, Sweden	Tri-City Storm (USHL)	—
22	(United States)	Nick Van Tassell	Freshman	F	6' 4" (1.93 m)	196 lb (89 kg)	2004-04-18	Basking Ridge, New Jersey	Green Bay Gamblers (USHL)	OTT, 215th overall 2023
23	(United States)	Scott Morrow	Junior	D	6' 2" (1.88 m)	192 lb (87 kg)	2002-11-01	Darien, Connecticut	Shattuck-Saint Mary's (Midget AAA)	CAR, 40th overall 2021
24	(Canada)	Elliott McDermott	Senior	D	5' 11" (1.8 m)	193 lb (88 kg)	1999-02-03	Kingston, Ontario	Colgate (ECAC)	—
25	(United States)	Aaron Bohlinger (C)	Senior	D	5' 9" (1.75 m)	165 lb (75 kg)	2000-08-25	Walden, New York	Waterloo Black Hawks (USHL)	—
26	(Canada)	Owen Murray	Sophomore	D	5' 10" (1.78 m)	181 lb (82 kg)	2002-12-01	Decker, Manitoba	Green Bay Gamblers (USHL)	—
27	(United States)	Michael Cameron	Sophomore	F	5' 10" (1.78 m)	174 lb (79 kg)	2002-07-24	Berwyn, Pennsylvania	Omaha Lancers (USHL)	—
28	(United States)	Bo Cosman	Freshman	F	6' 3" (1.91 m)	192 lb (87 kg)	2002-01-18	Milton, Georgia	Minnesota Wilderness (NAHL)	—
29	(Canada)	Eric DeDobbelaer	Sophomore (RS)	F	5' 10" (1.78 m)	180 lb (82 kg)	2000-06-15	Brantford, Ontario	Brantford 99ers (OJHL)	—
30	(Czech Republic)	Michael Hrabal	Freshman	G	6' 6" (1.98 m)	209 lb (95 kg)	2005-01-20	Prague, Czech Republic	Omaha Lancers (USHL)	ARI, 38th overall 2023
34	(Canada)	Cole Brady	Senior	G	6' 5" (1.96 m)	181 lb (82 kg)	2001-02-12	Pickering, Ontario	Arizona State (NCAA)	NJD, 127th overall 2019

== Standings ==
2023–24 Hockey East Standings
	Conference record										Overall record					
	GP	W	L	T	OTW	OTL	SW	PTS	GF	GA	GP	W	L	T	GF	GA
#2 Boston College †*	24	20	3	1	1	0	1	61	105	56	41	34	6	1	183	89
#3 Boston University	24	18	4	2	1	1	1	57	104	53	40	28	10	2	163	97
#10 Maine	24	14	9	1	0	1	0	44	76	67	37	23	12	2	119	94
#16 Providence	24	11	9	4	3	1	2	37	66	58	35	18	13	4	100	83
#13 Massachusetts	24	12	10	2	4	2	0	36	57	62	37	20	14	3	108	105
#20 New Hampshire	24	12	11	1	1	0	0	36	69	56	36	20	15	1	106	90
Northeastern	24	9	14	1	1	3	0	30	65	71	36	17	16	3	113	97
Connecticut	24	9	14	1	1	1	1	29	49	77	36	15	19	2	90	105
Vermont	24	7	14	3	1	0	3	26	52	81	35	13	19	3	87	106
Merrimack	24	6	17	1	0	1	1	21	62	85	35	13	21	1	98	114
Massachusetts Lowell	24	4	17	3	1	4	0	18	39	78	36	8	24	4	72	113
Championship: March 23, 2024 † indicates regular season champion * indicates conference tournament champion (Lamoriello Trophy); Rankings: USCHO Division I Men's Poll

== Schedule and results ==
Date	Time	Opponent^{#}	Rank^{#}	Site	TV	Decision	Result	Attendance	Record
Regular Season
October 7	7:00 pm	American International*		Mullins Center • Amherst, Massachusetts	ESPN+	Brady	W 5–3	4,324	1–0–0
October 8	4:00 pm	at Dartmouth*		Thompson Arena • Hanover, New Hampshire (Exhibition)			W 5–1		
October 13	7:00 pm	#6 Michigan*		Mullins Center • Amherst, Massachusetts	ESPN+	Brady	L 2–7	7,361	1–1–0
October 14	7:00 pm	#6 Michigan*		Mullins Center • Amherst, Massachusetts	ESPN+	Hrabal	W 6–3	8,412	2–1–0
October 20	8:07 pm	at #19 Minnesota State*		Mayo Clinic Health System Event Center • Mankato, Minnesota	FloHockey	Hrabal	W 6–3	4,233	3–1–0
October 21	7:07 pm	at #19 Minnesota State*		Mayo Clinic Health System Event Center • Mankato, Minnesota	FloHockey	Hrabal	W 1–0	4,543	4–1–0
October 27	7:00 pm	at #9 Boston University	#19	Agganis Arena • Boston, Massachusetts	ESPN+	Hrabal	L 2–5	5,172	4–2–0 (0–1–0)
October 28	7:00 pm	#9 Boston University	#19	Mullins Center • Amherst, Massachusetts	ESPN+	Hrabal	T 3–3 ^{SOL}	4,589	4–2–1 (0–1–1)
November 3	7:30 pm	Northeastern	#18	Mullins Center • Amherst, Massachusetts	ESPN+	Hrabal	W 2–1 ^{OT}	5,426	5–2–1 (1–1–1)
November 10	7:00 pm	Vermont	#14	Mullins Center • Amherst, Massachusetts	ESPN+, NESN	Brady	W 4−1	4,272	6−2−1 (2−1−1)
November 11	6:00 pm	Vermont	#14	Mullins Center • Amherst, Massachusetts	ESPN+	Hrabal	L 2–6	4,461	6–3–1 (2–2–1)
November 16	7:00 pm	at #5 Providence	#15	Schneider Arena • Providence, Rhode Island	ESPN+	Hrabal	W 3–2	2,828	7–3–1 (3–2–1)
November 18	7:00 pm	#5 Providence	#15	Mullins Center • Amherst, Massachusetts	ESPN+	Hrabal	W 2–1 ^{OT}	4,670	8–3–1 (4–2–1)
November 24	4:00 pm	at Harvard*	#11	Bright-Landry Hockey Center • Boston, Massachusetts	ESPN+, NESN	Brady	W 6–5 ^{OT}	—	9–3–1
December 1	7:00 pm	at Vermont	#10	Gutterson Fieldhouse • Burlington, Vermont	ESPN+	Hrabal	L 1–2 ^{OT}	2,748	9–4–1 (4–3–1)
December 8	7:00 pm	Alaska Anchorage*	#11	Mullins Center • Amherst, Massachusetts	ESPN+	Brady	W 11–2	4,410	10–4–1
December 9	7:00 pm	Alaska Anchorage*	#11	Mullins Center • Amherst, Massachusetts	ESPN+	Hrabal	W 3–2	3,685	11–4–1
Adirondack Winter Invitational
December 29	4:00 pm	vs. #17 Cornell*	#11	Herb Brooks Arena • Lake Placid, New York (Winter Invitational Semifinal)	ESPN+	Brady	T 2–2 ^{SOL}	4,037	11–4–2
December 30	4:00 pm	vs. Clarkson*	#11	Herb Brooks Arena • Lake Placid, New York (Winter Invitational Consolation Game)	ESPN+	Brady	L 4–5 ^{OT}	3,621	11–5–2
Regular Season
January 5	7:00 pm	Connecticut	#13	Mullins Center • Amherst, Massachusetts	ESPN+	Brady	T 3–3 ^{SOL}	2,630	11–5–3 (4–3–2)
January 12	7:00 pm	Merrimack	#13	Mullins Center • Amherst, Massachusetts	ESPN+	Hrabal	W 4–3	3,734	12–5–3 (5–3–2)
January 13	7:00 pm	at Merrimack	#13	J. Thom Lawler Rink • North Andover, Massachusetts	ESPN+	Hrabal	L 1–4	2,537	12–6–3 (5–4–2)
January 20	7:00 pm	at Northeastern	#12	Matthews Arena • Boston, Massachusetts	ESPN+	Hrabal	W 2–1	4,182	13–6–3 (6–4–2)
February 2	7:00 pm	at Merrimack	#11	J. Thom Lawler Rink • North Andover, Massachusetts	ESPN+	Hrabal	W 3–2	2,314	14–6–3 (7–4–2)
February 3	7:00 pm	#6 Maine	#11	Mullins Center • Amherst, Massachusetts	ESPN+	Hrabal	L 0–1	7,737	14–7–3 (7–5–2)
February 9	7:00 pm	at Connecticut	#12	Toscano Family Ice Forum • Storrs, Connecticut	ESPN+	Hrabal	W 2–0	2,691	15–7–3 (8–5–2)
February 10	7:00 pm	Connecticut	#12	Mullins Center • Amherst, Massachusetts	ESPN+, NESN	Hrabal	W 3–1	6,342	16–7–3 (9–5–2)
February 16	7:00 pm	#1 Boston College	#11	Mullins Center • Amherst, Massachusetts	ESPN+	Hrabal	L 1–5	8,412	16–8–3 (9–6–2)
February 18	1:00 pm	at #1 Boston College	#11	Conte Forum • Chestnut Hill, Massachusetts	ESPN+	Hrabal	L 4–6	7,008	16–9–3 (9–7–2)
February 23	7:00 pm	#16 New Hampshire	#14	Mullins Center • Amherst, Massachusetts	ESPN+	Hrabal	W 3–2	6,089	17–9–3 (10–7–2)
February 24	7:00 pm	at #16 New Hampshire	#14	Whittemore Center • Durham, New Hampshire	ESPN+	Hrabal	L 2–3 ^{OT}	6,085	17–10–3 (10–8–2)
March 1	7:15 pm	at Massachusetts Lowell	#14	Tsongas Center • Lowell, Massachusetts	ESPN+	Hrabal	W 2–1 ^{OT}	5,268	18–10–3 (11–8–2)
March 2	6:00 pm	Massachusetts Lowell	#14	Mullins Center • Amherst, Massachusetts	ESPN+	Hrabal	W 4–3 ^{OT}	6,289	19–10–3 (12–8–2)
March 8	7:00 pm	at #9 Maine	#12	Alfond Arena • Orono, Maine	ESPN+	Hrabal	L 1–2	5,043	19–11–3 (12–9–2)
March 9	7:00 pm	at #9 Maine	#12	Alfond Arena • Orono, Maine	ESPN+	Hrabal	L 3–4	5,043	19–12–3 (12–10–2)
Hockey East Tournament
March 16	7:00 pm	at #13 Providence*	#16	Schneider Arena • Providence, Rhode Island (Quarterfinal)	ESPN+, NESN+	Hrabal	W 3–1	2,644	20–12–3
March 22	4:00 pm	vs. #1 Boston College*	#13	TD Garden • Boston, Massachusetts (Semifinal)	ESPN+, NESN	Hrabal	L 1–8	17,850	20–13–3
NCAA Tournament
March 28	2:00 pm	vs. #3 Denver*	#13	MassMutual Center • Springfield, Massachusetts (Northeast Regional Semifinal)	ESPN2	Hrabal	L 1–2 ^{2OT}	3,894	20–14–3
*Non-conference game. ^{#}Rankings from USCHO.com Poll. All times are in Eastern Time. Source:

== NCAA tournament ==
=== Northeast regional semifinal ===
March 28, 2024; 2:00 pm	(1) Denver	2–1 (2OT) (0–0, 1–1, 0–0, 0–0, 1–0)	(4) Massachusetts	MassMutual Center; Attendance: 3,894

Game reference

Matt Davis
Goalies
Michael Hrabal
Referees:
Tony Czech
Jonathon Sitarski
Linesmen:
Justin Cornell
Pat Richardson

(Lemyre, Caponi) Boston Buckberger (9) – 25:12	1–0
	1–1	32:52 – Liam Gorman (1) (Murray, Vanroboys)
(Buckberger, Devine) Tristan Broz (15) – GW – 92:28	2–1

4 min
Penalties
4 min
43
Shots
47

Game summary
Both teams looked ready to play at the start. Denver was skating fast while Massachusetts played a more physical game, though the Pioneers didn't back down. Near the middle of the period, an odd bounce off of the end boards popped right out in front of the Denver cage to a streaking Michael Cameron. The Minuteman was unable to settle the bouncing puck and was forced to rush a close shot on Matt Davis. While the goalie stopped the relatively easy shot, the player lost his edge and slid into the netminder but the puck stayed out. Afterwards, the play began tilting in favor of Massachusetts thank to their forechecking and solid defensive play. Denver avoided another disaster when McKade Webster hit Zeev Buium with a clearing attempt. The puck rebounded towards the Denver cage but Davis was aware enough to stop the puck as it was rolling towards his feet. Denver was able to refocus after a TV timeout and play evened out for the final third of the period. Both teams got scoring chances in the final five minutes but the puck refused to cooperate and the game remained scoreless. With about two minutes left, Taylor Makar and Sean Behrens got into a battle behind the goal. Makar grabbed the Pioneer player as both fell down but the referees made no call. On the ensuing faceoff, Liam Gorman was called for a boarding minor and gave the nation's #16 power play a chance to score. UMass managed to kill off the rest of the period with a man down. Just before the final buzzer, the clock was stopped erroneously when the Minutemen cleared the puck into Denver's end of the ice. Rather than try to determine of there was any time remaining on the clock, the officials announced that the period was over. Because the faceoff would have been held at center ice with less than three seconds, neither team had any issue with the decision.

Denver continued to increase its offensive pressure in the second period and starting taking control of the game. Just past the 5-minute mark, a high cycle play ended up causing Michael Hrabal to get screened by both teams. With the goalie unable to see the puck, Boston Buckberger fired the puck from the top of the circle into the far corner for the first goal of the game. UMass resumed its physical play in the wake of the opening goal and tried to establish some zone time. While the Minutemen did get some scoring chances, Denver counterpunched and got several more chances of their own. The Minutemen continued to lay the body and eventually forced Denver into a turnover behind their own net with about seven minutes left in the period. The 4th-line for UMass threw the puck in front of the net for an attempt from Lucas Vanroboys but his shot was stopped by Davis. Davis also stopped the next shot off of the rebound but the puck then bounced to Liam Gormam. By then, Davis was sprawled out on his back and unable to stop the backhand, allowing Gorman to tie the game with his first of the season. Massachusetts seemed inspired by the goal and redoubled their efforts over the next several minutes. Davis came under siege by the UMass offense but he was able to weather the storm and keep the match tied. Vanroboys got a further chance with about 2 minutes to play but he was taken down on his way to the cage. Once more, the referees decided against calling a penalty, however, as Vanroboys' stick hit a Denver player in the head both could have ended up receiving minor penalties.

When play resumed in the third period, the style remained the same. UMass continued to attack Denver whenever the Pioneers got the puck and gave the favorites no room to maneuver. When Denver did get a scoring chance, their shots either went wide or were blocked before getting to the UMass net. Despite their failures to score, the pressure did eventually cause the Minutemen to make a mistake. Near the middle of the period, Behrens managed to get behind the Massachusetts defense and forced Linden Alger to take a hooking penalty. Denver wasn't able to get set up in the offensive zone but still had a few good looks at the net. With about 7 minutes to play, a mistake inside the UMass blue line by Aidan Thompson caused him to lose control of the puck. He then grabbed the Minuteman to prevent an odd-man rush and was called for interference. Near the end of the man-advantage, Cole O'Hara had a glorious opportunity for a one-timer but he wasn't able to get good wood on the puck and Davis made a relatively easy save. After the penalty expired, Massachusetts continued to carry the play and has several more scoring chances, but Davis stood his ground. In the final few minutes, Denver began to ratchet up their offense once more but the UMass defense was equal to the task.

Both teams began overtime by trying to score quick. End-to-end rushes by both sides were unable to break the tie. After a pair of near-misses by Denver, one from the doorstep by Jack Devine, UMass began generating some zone time of their own and the game continued to see-saw back and forth in the first 5 minutes. The mostly even battle persisted but Devine ended up getting a second chance to end the game when he wrapped the puck around the cage at the 8-minute mark. Unfortunately for Denver, his shot hit the side of the cage and stayed out. About a minute later, Scott Morrow nearly ended the game when Davis wasn't able to pick up his shot but the puck hit Davis in the shoulder and bounced wide. The play started to slow down in the middle part of the period as both teams were becoming tired. Ryan Lautenbach nearly got a chance to end the game with less than 7 minutes to play but the puck was deflected away at the last moment by Tristan Lemyre. Shortly thereafter, Devine got a third scoring chance in overtime after a missed clearing attempt but his shot was stopped by Hrabal's pad. A few minutes later it was Cam O'Neill's turn to get a scoring opportunity from the high slot but Davis was equally unbeatable. With less than 90 seconds to play, Davis missed the puck as it rolled behind the net. UMass knocked it out in front of the net for an open Lucas Mercuri but the puck jumped over his stick and the Minutemen missed an open cage.

The second overtime period began in a similar fashion, with scoring chances being generated by both teams, however, Denver's structure of was beginning to break down. UMass took advantage and got a few good looks at the cage in the third minute but Davis remained stout. Off of a faceoff in the UMass end, Sam Harris took a tripping call and gave UMass a second power play. Massachusetts won the ensuing faceoff and quickly got the puck on goal. While Davis made the save, he was felled by an apparent groin injury (though it turned out to just be cramps). After a medical stoppage, Davis remained in goal and tried to play through the pain. UMass got a few more changes on goal but Denver kept the Minutemen at bay. Right at the end of the penalty, Lautenbach got on a short-handed break but missed the net with his shot. After the penalty expired play evened out and both teams found enough energy to get several scoring chances. Hrabal's right pad continued to be save the game for UMass and allow his team to try and pull off the upset. Massachusetts held the balance of play in the middle of the period but Denver was able to set up in the offensive zone with less than eight minutes left. The puck was wrapped around behind the goal and came out to Tristan Broz in the high slot. He fired a shot into the top corner of the net for the apparent winning goal but the play was reviewed for goaltender interference. Sam Harris had made contact with Hrabal but the referees rules that he had been pushed into the crease by Aaron Bohlinger so the goal stood and Denver advanced.

== Scoring statistics ==
Name	Position	Games	Goals	Assists	Points	PIM
Scott Morrow	D	37	6	24	30	25
Jack Musa	F	37	12	17	29	6
Ryan Ufko	D	37	10	16	26	14
Aydar Suniev	LW	36	12	13	25	25
Lucas Mercuri	C	37	9	16	25	29
Ryan Lautenbach	RW	37	10	14	24	29
Kenny Connors	C	37	7	15	22	14
Cole O'Hara	RW	37	7	11	18	18
Dans Ločmelis	C	30	7	7	14	4
Samuli Niinisaari	D	27	3	9	12	4
Michael Cameron	C	35	6	4	10	0
Taylor Makar	C/LW	36	4	5	9	22
Owen Murray	D	31	2	7	9	4
Lucas Vanroboys	F	29	3	5	8	22
Aaron Bohlinger	D	34	3	5	8	4
Cam O'Neill	RW	28	3	4	7	23
Linden Alger	D	35	2	2	4	4
Liam Gorman	C	28	1	3	4	17
Sebastian Törnqvist	D	14	0	3	3	8
Nick VanTassell	C	24	1	1	2	19
Christian Sanda	F	15	0	2	2	4
Elliott McDermott	D	35	0	2	2	14
Bo Cosman	F	3	0	1	1	0
Kennedy O'Connor	D	1	0	0	0	0
Jackson Irving	G	1	0	0	0	0
Cole Brady	G	9	0	0	0	2
Michael Hrabal	G	30	0	0	0	0
Total			108	185	293	331

== Goaltending statistics ==
Name	Games	Minutes	Wins	Losses	Ties	Goals against	Saves	Shut outs	SV %	GAA
Jackson Irving	1	8:50	0	0	0	0	6	0	1.000	0.00
Michael Hrabal	30	1785:54	16	12	1	77	796	2	.912	2.59
Cole Brady	9	474:40	4	2	2	24	303	0	.886	3.03
Empty Net	-	12:40	-	-	-	4	-	-	-	-
Total	37	2282:04	20	14	3	105	989	2	.904	2.76

== Rankings ==
Poll	Week																										
Poll	Pre	1	2	3	4	5	6	7	8	9	10	11	12	13	14	15	16	17	18	19	20	21	22	23	24	25	26 (Final)
USCHO.com	NR	NR	NR	19	18	14т	15	11	10	11	11	–	13	13	12	11	11	12	11	14	14	12	16	13	13	–	13
USA Hockey	NR	NR	NR	19	18	14	15	11	10	11	10	10	–	13	12т	10	11	10	10	14	12	11	16	12	14	13	12

Note: USCHO did not release a poll in weeks 11 and 25.
Note: USA Hockey did not release a poll in week 12.

== Awards and honors ==
Player	Award	Ref
Ryan Ufko	AHCA East First Team All-American	
Ryan Ufko	Len Ceglarski Award	
Ryan Ufko	Hockey East First Team	
Michael Hrabal	Hockey East Second Team	
Scott Morrow	Hockey East Third Team	

== 2024 NHL entry draft ==
Round	Pick	Player	NHL team
4	116	Christian Kirsch ^{†}	San Jose Sharks

† incoming freshman
