= Victor Östman =

Swedish ice hockey player (born 2000)

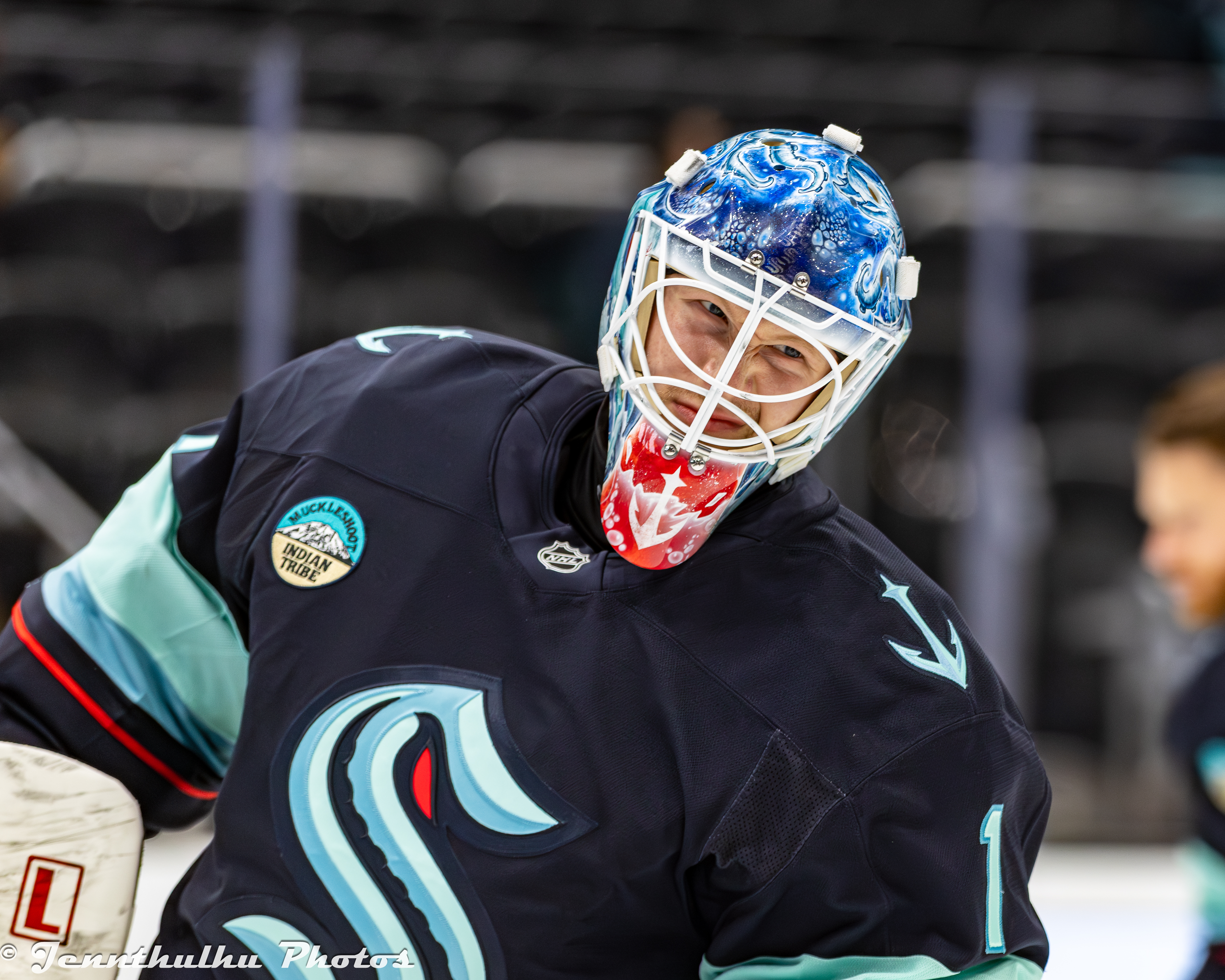
- Östman with the Seattle Kraken in 2026
- Born: 3 August 2000 (age 25) Danderyd, Sweden
- Height: 6 ft 4 in (193 cm)
- Weight: 205 lb (93 kg; 14 st 9 lb)
- Position: Goaltender
- Catches: Left
- NHL team (P) Cur. team Former teams: Seattle Kraken; Coachella Valley Firebirds (AHL); HV71
- NHL draft: Undrafted
- Playing career: 2024–present

Victor Östman (born 3 October 2000) is a Swedish professional ice hockey player who is a goaltender for the Coachella Valley Firebirds in the American Hockey League (AHL) while under contract to the Seattle Kraken of the National Hockey League (NHL). He had a four-year tenure with the Maine Black Bears ice hockey team of Hockey East before signing with the Kraken.

== Playing career ==
Östman was born on August 3, 2000, in Danderyd, Sweden, to parents Helene and Lars.

Östman played hockey in Sweden with HV71's SuperElit junior team, as well as some stints with their Swedish Hockey League (SHL) team.

Following three seasons with HV71, Östman opted to play in America, joining the Chicago Steel of the United States Hockey League (USHL) for the 2019–20 season. He said that the USHL is "a few levels better" than the SuperElit league. During the season, he maintained a 2.34 goals against average (GAA) and a .913 save percentage.

Following one season in the USHL, Östman committed to the University of Maine's hockey team, the Black Bears. In his freshman year, he achieved a 3–6–1 record, managing a 3.77 GAA and a .902 save percentage.

On 3 April 2024, the Seattle Kraken signed Östman to a two-year, entry-level contract. On 8 April, before joining the Kraken's American Hockey League (AHL) affiliate, the Coachella Valley Firebirds, he was named the Outstanding Graduating International Student by the Maine Business School.

During the 2024–25 season, on 8 April 2025, Östman made his NHL debut with the Kraken in relief of Joey Daccord against the Utah Hockey Club.

== Career statistics ==
			Regular season									Playoffs
Season	Team	League	GP	W	L	OT	MIN	GA	SO	GAA	SV%	GP	W	L	MIN	GA	SO	GAA	SV%
2016–17	HV71	J20	3	—	—	—	—	—	—	—	—	—	—	—	—	—	—	—	—
2017–18	HV71	SHL	2	—	—	—	—	—	—	—	—	—	—	—	—	—	—	—	—
2017–18	HV71	J20	17	7	8	0	951	52	0	3.28	.889	—	—	—	—	—	—	—	—
2018–19	HV71	SHL	3	—	—	—	—	—	—	—	—	—	—	—	—	—	—	—	—
2018–19	HV71	J20	21	15	6	0	1,267	61	0	2.89	.887	—	—	—	—	—	—	—	—
2019–20	Chicago Steel	USHL	30	25	4	0	1,742	68	0	2.34	.913	—	—	—	—	—	—	—	—
2020–21	University of Maine	HE	11	3	6	1	605	38	0	3.77	.902	—	—	—	—	—	—	—	—
2021–22	University of Maine	HE	21	5	14	1	1,234	68	0	3.31	.900	—	—	—	—	—	—	—	—
2022–23	University of Maine	HE	33	12	14	4	1,875	68	5	2.21	.918	—	—	—	—	—	—	—	—
2023–24	University of Maine	HE	21	13	6	1	1,198	56	0	2.81	.892	—	—	—	—	—	—	—	—
2024–25	Kansas City Mavericks	ECHL	32	21	7	4	1,880	79	2	2.52	.903	—	—	—	—	—	—	—	—
2024–25	Coachella Valley Firebirds	AHL	5	2	1	2	303	12	1	2.38	.916	—	—	—	—	—	—	—	—
2024–25	Seattle Kraken	NHL	1	0	0	0	20	0	0	0.00	1.000	—	—	—	—	—	—	—	—
2025–26	Coachella Valley Firebirds	AHL	36	17	15	3	2,025	95	2	2.81	.906	1	0	0	16	0	0	0.00	1.000
2025–26	Seattle Kraken	NHL	1	0	1	0	57	2	0	2.10	.943	—	—	—	—	—	—	—	—
NHL totals			2	0	1	0	77	2	0	1.56	.957	—	—	—	—	—	—	—	—
