= Ryan Greene (ice hockey) =

Canadian ice hockey player (born 2003)

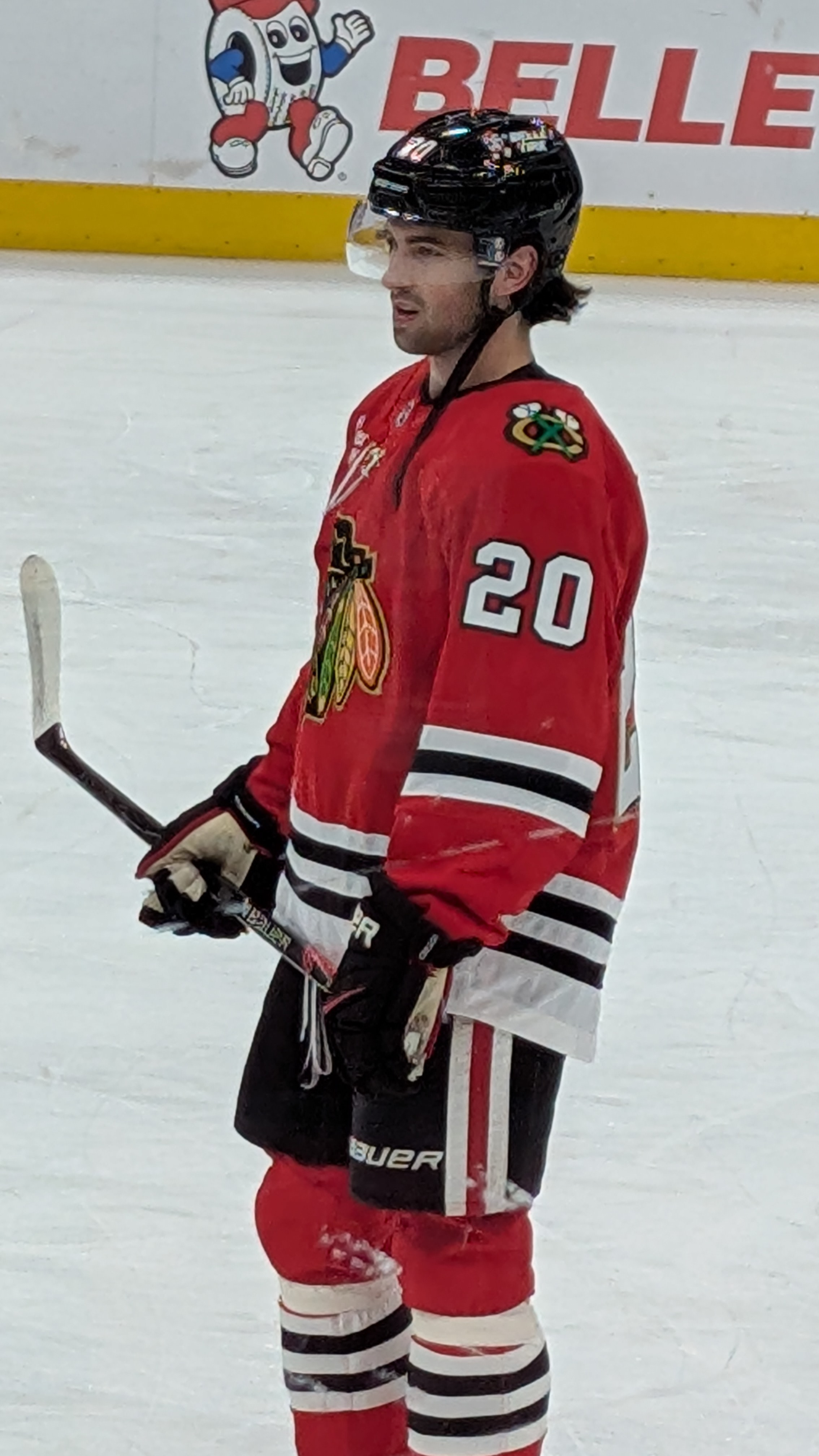
- Greene with the Blackhawks in 2026
- Born: October 21, 2003 (age 22) St. John's, Newfoundland and Labrador, Canada
- Height: 6 ft 1 in (185 cm)
- Weight: 195 lb (88 kg; 13 st 13 lb)
- Position: Centre
- Shoots: Right
- NHL team: Chicago Blackhawks
- NHL draft: 57th overall, 2022; Chicago Blackhawks
- Playing career: 2025–present

Ryan Greene (born October 21, 2003) is a Canadian professional ice hockey player who is a centre for the Chicago Blackhawks of the National Hockey League (NHL). Drafted by the Blackhawks with the 57th overall pick in the 2022 NHL entry draft, Greene played collegiate hockey for the Boston University Terriers of Hockey East, and previously played for the Green Bay Gamblers of the USHL.

== Playing career ==
Shortly following the 2025 Frozen Four, Greene signed a three-year entry-level contract with a $950,000 cap hit on April 13, 2025. He made his NHL debut the next day against the Montreal Canadiens.

Greene made the Blackhawks' opening day roster for the 2025 season due to injuries across the team and subsequently scored his first NHL goal against the St. Louis Blues on Oct. 15.

== Career statistics ==
			Regular season					Playoffs
Season	Team	League	GP	G	A	Pts	PIM	GP	G	A	Pts	PIM
2019–20	Green Bay Gamblers	USHL	18	3	2	5	2	—	—	—	—	—
2020–21	Green Bay Gamblers	USHL	51	12	20	32	24	2	0	0	0	0
2021–22	Green Bay Gamblers	USHL	59	19	32	51	53	—	—	—	—	—
2022–23	Boston University	HE	38	9	22	31	20	—	—	—	—	—
2023–24	Boston University	HE	40	12	24	36	6	—	—	—	—	—
2024–25	Boston University	HE	40	13	25	38	18	—	—	—	—	—
2024–25	Chicago Blackhawks	NHL	2	0	0	0	0	—	—	—	—	—
2025–26	Chicago Blackhawks	NHL	81	12	17	29	14	—	—	—	—	—
NHL totals			83	12	17	29	14	—	—	—	—	—
