= Maine–New Hampshire men's ice hockey rivalry =

Sports rivalry in the United States

- Maine New Hampshire
- Sport: Ice hockey
- First meeting: 15 December 1979
- Latest meeting: 6 December 2025; UNH 3, Maine 2
- Stadiums: Harold Alfond Sports Arena, Whittemore Center Arena

Statistics
- Total meetings: 151
- All-time series: Maine leads 75–61–15
- Largest victory: 28 January 1987 Maine 10, UNH 1
- Longest win streak: Maine, 9 (4 February 1989 – 7 December 1991)
- Longest unbeaten streak: Maine, 15 (4 February 1989 - 6 March 1993)
- Current win streak: New Hampshire, 2
- Current unbeaten streak: New Hampshire, 3

Locations of Maine and UNH

The Maine–New Hampshire men's ice hockey rivalry, sometimes referred to as the Border War or Border Battle, is a men's ice hockey rivalry between the Maine Black Bears and New Hampshire Wildcats. The proximity of the two states, the success of the two programs, and their history in high-profile games have caused one of the most intense rivalries in American college hockey. College Hockey News has ranked it as the seventh-best Division I college hockey rivalry.

== History ==
The two teams first played in 1979. In the early 1990s, Maine dominated, winning 18 out of 19 games in one stretch. The rivalry came to a head in 1999. UNH and Maine played a two-game series to finish the regular season at the Whittemore Center. UNH had to win the series to clinch the top seed in the Hockey East playoffs and swept the two-game series. The two teams met again a month later in the 1999 national championship. Although Maine took an early lead in the game, UNH came from behind to force overtime. Maine then won in overtime. Afterwards the UNH fans rioted; overturning cars, performing basic vandalism on anything in sight, even launching an unmanned snowmobile engulfed in flames across the campus.

Since February 3rd, 2003 Maine leads the series at 23 wins and 20 losses. Three years after Maine's victory in the national title game UNH won its first Hockey East title with a victory over Maine. Maine gained revenge for this loss several weeks later, however, by defeating UNH in the 2002 Frozen Four. The series became very evenly matched for some time before UNH became more dominant in the late 2000s and won 6 games in a row over two seasons. In 2012 Maine and UNH played in a Winter Classic type game and Maine won 5–4 in overtime at Fenway Park, after giving up the first 2 goals. Maine's ice hockey program has been more successful overall than UNH, having won two national titles and five Hockey East titles while UNH has won two Hockey East titles and has not won a national championship.

== Traditions ==
One factor that contributes to the intensity of the rivalry is the similarity of the two states. Fans of each program often work together and frequent the same restaurants in places such as Portsmouth, New Hampshire and Kittery, Maine. Though the two schools are 165 miles (266 km) apart, many Maine fans from southern Maine live closer to UNH's campus in Durham, New Hampshire than to the University of Maine's campus in Orono, Maine, ensuring a high turnout of Maine fans when UNH hosts Maine. The two programs also recruit many of the same potential players from New England, though there are often very few New Hampshire natives on UNH's team and few Maine natives on Maine's team.

In 1999 UNH began asking their fans to dress in white each time Maine traveled to the Whittemore Center in what they dubbed "White out the Whit" nights. The student tickets for these games sell out faster than any others. Maine supporters often refer to UNH as the "University of No Hardware" due to their lack of championships. During one series in Maine, Maine fans pelted visiting UNH fans with snowballs. UNH fans often raise the issue of NCAA violations committed by Maine under Shawn Walsh. They have also brought newspapers to the games to read while Maine's starting lineup is being introduced. The two schools have announced plans to move two of their games each year to the last week of the regular season.

In addition to ice hockey, UNH and Maine are considered rivals in basketball and football as well.

== Game results ==
Maine victories	New Hampshire victories

No.	Date	Location	Winner	Score
1	15 December 1979	Orono, ME	Maine	5–3
2	16 February 1980	Durham, NH	Maine	6–5
3	27 December 1980	Durham, NH	New Hampshire	10–4
4	26 February 1981	Orono, ME	Maine	5–2
5	2 December 1981	Orono, ME	Maine	7–5
6	27 February 1982	Durham, NH	New Hampshire	8–5
7	4 March 1982	Orono, ME	New Hampshire	5–2
8	30 December 1982	Hanover, NH	New Hampshire	8–5
9	18 January 1983	Durham, NH	New Hampshire	4–3
10	31 December 1983	Hanover, NH	New Hampshire	5–4
11	5 February 1984	Durham, NH	New Hampshire	5–2
12	7 February 1984	Orono, ME	Maine	3–0
13	16 October 1984	Durham, NH	Maine	4–2
14	2 February 1985	Orono, ME	New Hampshire	7–6
15	3 February 1985	Orono, ME	New Hampshire	7–3
16	14 November 1986	Durham, NH	Maine	6–5
17	15 November 1986	Durham, NH	Maine	3–2
18	27 January 1987	Orono, ME	Maine	8–2
19	28 January 1987	Orono, ME	Maine	10–1
20	29 January 1988	Orono, ME	Maine	5–2
21	31 January 1988	Orono, ME	Maine	9–2
22	26 February 1988	Durham, ME	Maine	6–2
23	1 November 1988	Orono, ME	Maine	6–2
24	3 February 1989	Durham, NH	New Hampshire	4–3
25	4 February 1989	Durham, NH	Maine	6–4
26	9 February 1990	Orono, ME	Maine	4–2
27	10 February 1990	Orono, ME	Maine	8–3
28	16 February 1990	Durham, NH	Maine	3–2
29	11 December 1990	Orono, ME	Maine	4–0
30	18 January 1991	Durham, NH	Maine	8–4
31	23 February 1991	Durham, NH	Maine	4–2
32	6 December 1991	Orono, ME	Maine	9–0
33	7 December 1991	Orono, ME	Maine	6–2
34	22 February 1992	Durham, NH	Tie	4–4
35	14 March 1992	Boston, MA†	Maine	4–1
36	11 December 1992	Portland, ME	Maine	4–3
37	29 January 1993	Durham, NH	Maine	5–2
38	30 January 1993	Durham, NH	Maine	8–3
39	6 March 1993	Orono, ME	Maine	5–2
40	10 December 1993	Orono, ME	New Hampshire	7–3
41	4 February 1994	Orono, ME	Tie	1–1
42	5 February 1994	Orono, ME	New Hampshire	1–0
43	4 March 1994	Durham, NH	New Hampshire	3–1
44	4 November 1994	Durham, NH	Maine	4–3
45	5 November 1994	Durham, NH	Maine	6–1
46	2 March 1995	Durham, NH	New Hampshire	3–2
47	3 March 1995	Orono, ME	Maine	5–3
48	3 November 1995	Orono, ME	Tie	4–4
49	4 November 1995	Orono, ME	Tie	3–3
50	24 November 1995	Durham, NH	Maine	6–3
51	11 February 1996	Durham, NH	Maine	6–5
52	7 March 1996	Orono, ME†	Maine	4–2
53	8 March 1996	Orono, ME†	Maine	8–4
54	15 November 1996	Durham, NH	New Hampshire	6–3
55	16 November 1996	Durham, NH	New Hampshire	6–5
56	30 November 1996	Orono, ME	New Hampshire	7–2
57	18 February 1997	Orono, ME	Maine	5–1
58	29 November 1997	Durham, NH	New Hampshire	7–0
59	16 January 1998	Orono, ME	New Hampshire	2–1
60	17 January 1998	Orono, ME	New Hampshire	5–0
61	1 February 1998	Durham, NH	Maine	3–1
62	13 March 1998	Durham, NH†	Maine	3–2
63	14 March 1998	Durham, NH†	Maine	5–3
64	27 November 1998	Lowell, MA	Maine	4–3
65	7 February 1999	Orono, ME	Maine	4–3
66	5 March 1999	Durham, NH	New Hampshire	6–1
67	6 March 1999	Durham, NH	New Hampshire	4–1
68	3 April 1999	Anaheim, CA††	Maine	3–2
69	7 January 2000	Orono, ME	Maine	9–4
70	8 January 2000	Orono, ME	New Hampshire	5–4
71	6 February 2000	Durham, NH	New Hampshire	1–0
72	5 January 2001	Durham, NH	Tie	0–0
73	6 January 2001	Durham, NH	New Hampshire	4–1
74	4 February 2001	Orono, ME	Maine	3–2
75	1 December 2001	Durham, NH	New Hampshire	4–1
76	1 February 2002	Orono, ME	Maine	6–3

No.	Date	Location	Winner	Score
77	2 February 2002	Orono, ME	Tie	2–2
78	16 March 2002	Boston, MA†	New Hampshire	3–1
79	4 April 2002	St Paul, MN††	Maine	7–2
80	22 November 2002	Orono, ME	Maine	2–1
81	1 February 2003	Durham, NH	New Hampshire	4–2
82	2 February 2003	Durham, NH	Maine	3–2
83	8 November 2003	Durham, NH	New Hampshire	6–3
84	30 January 2004	Orono, ME	Maine	5–4
85	31 January 2004	Orono, ME	Maine	5–0
86	7 November 2004	Orono, ME	Maine	3–0
87	4 February 2005	Durham, NH	Maine	3–1
88	5 February 2005	Durham, NH	New Hampshire	2–1
89	12 November 2005	Durham, NH	New Hampshire	4–2
90	3 February 2006	Orono, ME	Maine	4–1
91	4 February 2006	Orono, ME	New Hampshire	7–4
92	12 November 2006	Orono, ME	New Hampshire	8–2
93	2 February 2007	Manchester, NH	Maine	4–2
94	3 February 2007	Durham, NH	New Hampshire	2–1
95	16 December 2007	Durham, NH	New Hampshire	2–0
96	8 February 2008	Orono, ME	New Hampshire	3–2
97	9 February 2008	Orono, ME	New Hampshire	4–1
98	4 January 2009	Orono, ME	New Hampshire	5–4
99	6 February 2009	Durham, NH	New Hampshire	4–1
100	7 February 2009	Durham, NH	Maine	1–0
101	24 December 2009	Durham, NH	New Hampshire	5–2
102	5 February 2010	Orono, ME	Maine	3–2
103	6 February 2010	Orono, ME	Maine	6–3
104	12 December 2010	Orono, ME	New Hampshire	4–3
105	4 February 2011	Durham, NH	New Hampshire	6–3
106	5 February 2011	Durham, NH	New Hampshire	5–4
107	5 November 2011	Durham, NH	New Hampshire	3–2
108	7 January 2012	Boston, MA	Maine	5–4
109	3 March 2012	Orono, ME	Maine	1–0
110	4 November 2012	Orono, ME	New Hampshire	4–0
111	8 March 2013	Durham, NH	Maine	4–3
112	9 March 2013	Durham, NH	Tie	4–4
113	24 January 2014	Durham, NH	New Hampshire	3–2
114	25 January 2014	Orono, ME	Maine	4–2
115	12 December 2014	Manchester, NH	Maine	5–2
116	13 December 2014	Portland, ME	New Hampshire	7–4
117	23 January 2015	Orono, ME	Maine	6–4
118	24 January 2015	Durham, NH	Maine	4–0
119	4 December 2015	Orono, ME	Tie	3–3
120	5 December 2015	Durham, NH	New Hampshire	5–2
121	29 December 2015	Portland, ME	New Hampshire	5–4
122	30 December 2015	Manchester, NH	New Hampshire	7–0
123	2 December 2016	Durham, NH	New Hampshire	5–1
124	3 December 2016	Orono, ME	New Hampshire	4–3
125	30 December 2016	Durham, NH	New Hampshire	6–4
126	19 January 2018	Orono, ME	Tie	2–2
127	20 January 2018	Orono, ME	Tie	3–3
128	14 February 2018	Durham, NH	Maine	4–3
129	2 March 2018	Orono, ME†	Maine	4–1
130	3 March 2018	Orono, ME†	Maine	3–2
131	21 January 2019	Orono, ME	Tie	4–4
132	1 February 2019	Durham, NH	New Hampshire	3–2^{OT}
133	2 February 2019	Durham, NH	Maine	5–3
134	15 November 2019	Orono, ME	Maine	3–1
135	16 November 2019	Orono, ME	Maine	2–1 ^{OT}
136	11 December 2020	Durham, NH	Tie	1–1
137	12 December 2020	Durham, NH	New Hampshire	6–2
138	10 March 2021	Orono, ME†	New Hampshire	7–2
139	18 February 2022	Orono, ME	Maine	6–3
140	19 February 2022	Orono, ME	New Hampshire	5–2
141	17 February 2023	Durham, NH	Tie	2–2
142	18 February 2023	Durham, NH	Tie	0–0
143	1 December 2023	Orono, ME	Maine	5–2
144	16 February 2024	Durham, NH	New Hampshire	6–2
145	17 February 2024	Durham, NH	New Hampshire	5–2
146	16 March 2024	Orono, ME†	Maine	5–0
147	22 November 2024	Durham, NH	Maine	3–1
148	14 February 2025	Orono, ME	Tie	1–1
149	15 February 2025	Orono, ME	Maine	5–2
150	5 December 2025	Orono, ME	New Hampshire	1–0
151	6 December 2025	Orono, ME	New Hampshire	3–2
Series: Maine leads 75–61–15

† Hockey East Tournament †† NCAA National Tournament

=== Results by decade ===
Decade	Series
1970s	Maine, 1–0–0
1980s	Maine, 14–10–0
1990s	Maine, 27–12–4
2000s	New Hampshire, 18–13–2
2010s	Maine, 15–14–5
2020s	New Hampshire, 7-5-4

== See also ==
- Battle for the Brice–Cowell Musket (football rivalry)
