= 2021–22 Hockey East men's season =

- Season: 2021–22
- Conference: Hockey East
- Division: Division I
- Sport: men's ice hockey
- Duration: October 2, 2021– March 25, 2022
- Number of teams: 11

2022 NHL Entry Draft
- Top draft pick: Jack Hughes
- Picked by: Los Angeles Kings

Regular Season
- Season champions: Northeastern
- Season MVP: Bobby Trivigno
- Top scorer: Bobby Trivigno

Hockey East tournament
- Tournament champions: Massachusetts
- Runners-up: Connecticut
- Tournament MVP: Bobby Trivigno
- Top scorer: Bobby Trivigno

NCAA tournament
- Bids: 3
- Record: 0–3
- Best Finish: Regional semifinal
- Team(s): Massachusetts; Massachusetts Lowell; Northeastern

The 2021–22 Hockey East men's season was the 38th season of play for Hockey East and took place during the 2021–22 NCAA Division I men's ice hockey season. The regular season began on October 2, 2021, and concluded on March 5, 2022. The conference tournament ended on March 19 with Massachusetts winning the championship.

== Coaches ==
Ben Barr became the 8th head coach for Maine one month after the sudden death of his predecessor, Red Gendron.

Jerry Keefe was promoted to head coach after Jim Madigan became the athletic director for Northeastern.

=== Records ===
Team	Head coach	Season at school	Record at school	Hockey East record
Boston College	Jerry York	28	641–329–81	379–197–70
Boston University	Albie O'Connell	4	39–36–13	32–21–9
Connecticut	Mike Cavanaugh	9	103–135–33	46–61–16
Maine	Ben Barr	1	0–0–0	0–0–0
Massachusetts	Greg Carvel	6	94–75–10	56–51–9
Massachusetts Lowell	Norm Bazin	11	215–119–33	123–79–28
Merrimack	Scott Borek	4	21–57–8	16–43–8
New Hampshire	Michael Souza	4	33–44–16	22–35–12
Northeastern	Jerry Keefe	1	0–0–0	0–0–0
Providence	Nate Leaman	11	203–122–49	122–80–33
Vermont	Todd Woodcroft	2	1–10–2	1–9–2

== Standings ==
2021–22 Hockey East Standings
	Conference record										Overall record					
	GP	W	L	T	OTW	OTL	SOW	PTS	GF	GA	GP	W	L	T	GF	GA
#12 Northeastern †	24	15	8	1	1	1	1	47	68	46	39	25	13	1	99	68
#10 Massachusetts *	24	14	8	2	2	3	1	46	77	54	37	22	13	2	117	88
#13 Massachusetts Lowell	24	15	8	1	1	0	1	46	62	48	35	21	11	3	102	74
#19 Connecticut	24	14	10	0	2	1	0	41	73	61	36	20	16	0	109	89
Boston University	24	13	8	3	3	2	0	41	69	58	35	19	13	3	107	89
Merrimack	24	13	11	0	1	3	0	41	70	70	35	19	15	1	109	99
#20 Providence	24	12	11	1	1	1	1	38	61	52	38	22	14	2	118	82
Boston College	24	9	12	3	0	1	1	32	67	77	38	15	18	5	114	123
New Hampshire	24	8	15	1	2	2	0	25	47	71	34	14	19	1	76	95
Vermont	24	6	16	2	3	1	2	20	41	72	35	8	25	2	59	101
Maine	24	5	17	2	2	3	1	19	54	80	33	7	22	4	74	111
Championship: March 19, 2022 † indicates regular season champion * indicates conference tournament champion (Lamoriello Trophy); Rankings: USCHO.com Top 20 Poll

== Non-Conference record ==
Of the sixteen teams that are selected to participate in the NCAA tournament, ten will be via at-large bids. Those 10 teams are determined based upon the PairWise rankings. The rankings take into account all games played but are heavily affected by intra-conference results. The result is that teams from leagues which perform better in non-conference are much more likely to receive at-large bids even if they possess inferior records overall.

Hockey East produced a good record during their non-conference schedule, however, the teams did not receive much of a benefit from those victories. The bulk of the leagues games were played against Atlantic Hockey and ECAC Hockey, the two weakest conferences this season. Despite finishing 20 games above .500 against those two combined, the improvement to each team's PairWise rankings was relatively small. The minimal bonus from these games was largely the cause for the conference's low rankings.

=== Regular season record ===
Team	Atlantic Hockey	Big Ten	CCHA	ECAC Hockey	Independent	NCHC	Total
Boston College	2–1–0	0–1–0	0–0–0	2–1–2	0–0–0	1–1–0	5–4–2
Boston University	1–1–0	0–0–0	0–2–0	2–1–0	2–0–0	0–0–0	5–4–0
Connecticut	1–1–0	0–2–0	0–0–0	3–2–0	0–0–0	0–0–0	4–5–0
Maine	0–1–1	0–0–0	0–0–0	1–0–1	1–1–0	0–2–0	2–4–2
Massachusetts	2–0–0	0–2–0	0–2–0	0–0–0	2–0–0	0–0–0	4–4–0
Massachusetts Lowell	0–0–0	1–0–1	0–0–0	2–0–0	2–1–1	0–0–0	5–1–2
Merrimack	3–0–0	0–0–0	0–0–0	2–2–1	0–0–0	0–0–0	5–2–1
New Hampshire	2–0–0	0–0–0	0–0–0	4–1–0	0–2–0	0–0–0	6–3–0
Northeastern	1–0–0	0–0–0	0–0–0	3–1–0	2–1–0	1–0–0	7–2–0
Providence	3–0–0	0–0–1	1–1–0	4–0–0	0–0–0	1–1–0	9–2–1
Vermont	0–1–0	0–0–0	0–0–0	1–6–0	1–1–0	0–0–0	2–8–0
Overall	15–5–1	1–5–2	1–5–0	24–14–4	9–6–1	3–4–0	53–39–8

== Statistics ==
=== Leading scorers ===
GP = Games played; G = Goals; A = Assists; Pts = Points

Player	Class	Team	GP	G	A	Pts
Bobby Trivigno	Senior	Massachusetts	24	14	18	32
Ryan Tverberg	Sophomore	Connecticut	24	11	15	26
Aidan McDonough	Junior	Northeastern	24	16	9	25
Scott Morrow	Freshman	Massachusetts	24	11	12	23
Max Newton	Senior	Merrimack	24	5	18	23
Wilmer Skoog	Junior	Boston University	24	14	8	22
Brett Berard	Sophomore	Providence	24	7	15	22
Jáchym Kondelík	Senior	Connecticut	24	7	15	22
Ryan Ufko	Freshman	Massachusetts	24	3	19	22
Liam Walsh	Senior	Merrimack	24	7	13	20
Steven Jandric	Senior	Merrimack	24	7	13	20

=== Leading goaltenders ===
Minimum 1/3 of team's minutes played in conference games.
GP = Games played; Min = Minutes played; W = Wins; L = Losses; T = Ties; GA = Goals against; SO = Shutouts; SV% = Save percentage; GAA = Goals against average

Player	Class	Team	GP	Min	W	L	T	GA	SO	SV%	GAA
Devon Levi	Sophomore	Northeastern	19	1095:46	12	6	2	30	5	.951	1.64
Owen Savory	Senior	Massachusetts Lowell	21	1256:43	15	5	1	38	5	.931	1.81
Jaxson Stauber	Junior	Providence	24	1424:52	12	11	1	49	3	.921	2.06
Hugo Ollas	Freshman	Merrimack	11	569:06	6	3	0	20	1	.927	2.11
Matt Murray	Graduate	Massachusetts	24	1400:24	14	7	2	51	3	.920	2.19

== Conference tournament ==
Teams are reseeded after the Opening Round and Quarterfinals

Opening Round; March 9
6	Merrimack	6
11	Maine	2
7	Providence	2
10	Vermont	1
8	Boston College	4*
9	New Hampshire	3

Quarterfinals; March 12
1	Northeastern	3
8	Boston College	2
2	Massachusetts	4
7	Providence	2
3	Massachusetts Lowell	7
6	Merrimack	2
4	Connecticut	3
5	Boston University	1

Semifinals; March 18
1	Northeastern	1
4	Connecticut	4
2	Massachusetts	3
3	Massachusetts Lowell	1

Championship; March 19
4	Connecticut	1
2	Massachusetts	2*

Note: * denotes overtime period(s)

== NCAA tournament ==
=== Regional semifinal ===
==== Northeast Regional ====
March 25, 2022; 12:00 PM	(1) Western Michigan	2 – 1 (OT) (1–0, 0–0, 0–1, 1–0)	(4) Northeastern	DCU Center; Attendance: 6,002

Game reference

Brandon Bussi
Goalies
Devon Levi
Referees:
Brendan Blanchard
Chris Leavitt
Linesmen:
Brendan Lewis
Matt Terreri

(Worrad, Frank) Cole Gallant (9) – 14:01	1–0
	1–1	56:40 – Aidan McDonough (25) (Colangelo)
(unassisted) Luke Grainger (9) – GW – 61:33	2–1

2 min
Penalties
6 min
36
Shots
31

March 25, 2022; 6:00 PM	(2) Minnesota	4 – 3 (OT) (1–2, 1–1, 1–0, 1–0)	(3) Massachusetts	DCU Center; Attendance: 6,002

Game reference

Justen Close
Goalies
Matt Murray
Referees:
Ryan Hersey
Nick Krebsbach
Linesmen:
John Grandt
Tyler Liffrig

	0–1	14:09 – EA – Reed Lebster (8) (Kiefiuk, Ufko)
	0–2	15:05 – PP – Garrett Wait (13) (Ufko, Trivigno)
(Meyers, Knies) Ryan Johnson (3) – 18:02	1–2
	1–3	21:24 – Reed Lebster (9) (Kiefiuk, Del Gaizo)
(Nelson, Pitlick) Tristan Broz (6) – 37:09	2–3
(unassisted) Matthew Knies (13) – PP – 53:17	3–3
(Huglen, Nelson) Ben Meyers (17) – GW – 68:31	4–3

2 min
Penalties
4 min
24
Shots
23

==== West Regional ====
March 24, 2022; 7:00 PM	(1) Denver	3 – 2 (1–1, 0–0, 2–1)	(4) Massachusetts Lowell	Budweiser Events Center; Attendance: 3,138

Game reference

Magnus Chrona
Goalies
Owen Savory
Referees:
Tony Czech
Kenny Anderson
Linesmen:
Sam Shikowsky
Nicholas Bradshaw

	0–1	09:42 – Lucas Condotta (10) (Stefanson, Korencik)
(Lee, Tuomisto) Brett Stapley (16) – 18:36	1–1
(Benning) Carter Savoie (21) – 49:26	2–1
	2–2	54:21 – Connor Sodergren (7) (McDonald, Crasa)
(Mazur) Cameron Wright (21) – GW – 57:03	3–2

19 min
Penalties
10 min
28
Shots
18

== Ranking ==
=== USCHO ===
Team	Pre	1	2	3	4	5	6	7	8	9	10	11	12	13	14	15	16	17	18	19	20	21	22	23	Final
Boston College	7	6	6	10	9	14	16	19	19	20	NR	20	18	20	NR	NR	NR	NR	NR	NR	NR	NR	NR	NR	NR
Boston University	10	10	12	16	19	NR	NR	NR	NR	NR	NR	NR	NR	NR	NR	NR	19	20	17	13	14	16	18	NR	NR
Connecticut	NR	NR	NR	NR	NR	NR	NR	NR	NR	NR	NR	NR	NR	NR	NR	NR	NR	NR	20	19	NR	NR	19	19	19
Maine	NR	NR	NR	NR	NR	NR	NR	NR	NR	NR	NR	NR	NR	NR	NR	NR	NR	NR	NR	NR	NR	NR	NR	NR	NR
Massachusetts	1	7	9	9	12	12	8	8	13	14	12	12	10	14	14	9	10	9	10	10	9	12	11	10	10
Massachusetts Lowell	NR	NR	NR	NR	NR	19	20	15	15	15	15	15	12	12	10	14	14	13	16	16	16	14	13	13	12
Merrimack	NR	NR	NR	NR	NR	NR	NR	NR	NR	NR	NR	NR	NR	NR	NR	19	NR	NR	NR	NR	NR	NR	NR	NR	NR
New Hampshire	NR	NR	NR	NR	NR	NR	NR	NR	NR	NR	NR	NR	NR	NR	NR	NR	NR	NR	NR	NR	NR	NR	NR	NR	NR
Northeastern	NR	18	18	20	20	NR	17	18	18	16	13	13	11	11	12	15	16	15	13	15	13	11	10	12	13
Providence	12	11	10	12	8	7	12	12	14	13	16	16	16	17	18	17	17	17	19	19	19	20	20	20	20
Vermont	NR	NR	NR	NR	NR	NR	NR	NR	NR	NR	NR	NR	NR	NR	NR	NR	NR	NR	NR	NR	NR	NR	NR	NR	NR

=== USA Today ===
Team	Pre	1	2	3	4	5	6	7	8	9	10	11	12	13	14	15	16	17	18	19	20	21	22	23	24	Final
Boston College	8	8	7	10	13	15	NR	NR	NR	NR	NR	NR	NR	NR	NR	NR	NR	NR	NR	NR	NR	NR	NR	NR	NR	NR
Boston University	10	10	15	NR	NR	NR	NR	NR	NR	NR	NR	NR	NR	NR	NR	NR	NR	NR	NR	14	14	NR	NR	NR	NR	NR
Connecticut	NR	NR	NR	NR	NR	NR	NR	NR	NR	NR	NR	NR	NR	NR	NR	NR	NR	NR	NR	NR	NR	NR	NR	NR	NR	NR
Maine	NR	NR	NR	NR	NR	NR	NR	NR	NR	NR	NR	NR	NR	NR	NR	NR	NR	NR	NR	NR	NR	NR	NR	NR	NR	NR
Massachusetts	1	6	9	9	10	12	9	8	13	14	12	12	9	14	12	8	9	9	9	10	9	12	12	9	10	10
Massachusetts Lowell	NR	NR	NR	NR	NR	NR	NR	NR	NR	15	15	14	12	12	9	14	15	13	NR	NR	NR	14	13	13	12	13
Merrimack	NR	NR	NR	NR	NR	NR	NR	NR	NR	NR	NR	NR	NR	NR	NR	NR	NR	NR	NR	NR	NR	NR	NR	NR	NR	NR
New Hampshire	NR	NR	NR	NR	NR	NR	NR	NR	NR	NR	NR	NR	NR	NR	NR	NR	NR	NR	NR	NR	NR	NR	NR	NR	NR	NR
Northeastern	NR	NR	NR	NR	NR	NR	NR	NR	NR	NR	13	13	10	9	13	15	NR	NR	14	15	13	11	11	12	13	12
Providence	14	11	10	14	8	8	13	11	14	13	NR	NR	NR	NR	NR	NR	NR	NR	NR	NR	NR	NR	NR	NR	NR	NR
Vermont	NR	NR	NR	NR	NR	NR	NR	NR	NR	NR	NR	NR	NR	NR	NR	NR	NR	NR	NR	NR	NR	NR	NR	NR	NR	NR

=== Pairwise ===
Team	1	2	3	4	5	6	7	8	9	10	11	12	13	14	15	16	17	18	19	20	21	22	Final
Boston College	14	1	19	29	30	31	26	26	26	26	23	18	22	30	30	32	33	36	33	32	27	28	27
Boston University	14	19	32	30	38	49	44	39	43	35	33	33	28	27	27	22	21	18	14	16	16	18	17
Connecticut	7	4	30	27	17	13	25	24	23	22	20	22	19	24	28	25	21	19	14	19	20	19	20
Maine	14	40	38	50	56	58	58	57	56	58	57	54	52	53	56	54	54	54	52	52	51	51	51
Massachusetts	14	17	15	14	14	7	11	12	13	10	9	9	10	7	5	7	6	8	9	10	12	11	11
Massachusetts Lowell	10	41	13	18	8	18	15	21	14	13	12	10	9	9	14	12	14	14	16	15	13	13	13
Merrimack	14	12	24	22	28	30	27	27	27	28	28	28	28	22	14	17	15	20	20	19	20	20	22
New Hampshire	14	25	31	36	32	49	47	46	40	41	41	39	37	31	29	29	30	30	30	30	31	33	33
Northeastern	1	6	27	28	31	27	24	25	18	13	13	12	12	15	17	16	17	14	18	14	14	14	14
Providence	3	2	11	8	10	17	22	19	16	21	17	16	17	17	14	15	15	17	18	18	18	17	17
Vermont	14	31	40	42	50	56	55	56	54	55	55	57	57	59	58	59	58	57	57	58	54	55	55

Note: teams ranked in the top-10 automatically qualify for the NCAA tournament. Teams ranked 11-16 can qualify based upon conference tournament results.

== Awards ==
=== NCAA ===
Award		Recipient
Tim Taylor Award		Devon Levi, Northeastern
Mike Richter Award		Devon Levi, Northeastern
AHCA All-American Teams
East First Team	Position	Team
Devon Levi	G	Northeastern
Scott Morrow	D	Massachusetts
Aidan McDonough	F	Northeastern
Bobby Trivigno	F	Massachusetts
East Second Team	Position	Team
Jordan Harris	D	Northeastern
Jack McBain	F	Boston College
Ryan Tverberg	F	Connecticut

=== Hockey East ===
Award		Recipient
Player of the Year		Bobby Trivigno, Massachusetts
Best Defensive Forward		Jáchym Kondelík, Connecticut
Best Defensive Defenseman		Jordan Harris, Northeastern
Rookie of the Year		Devon Levi, Northeastern
Goaltending Champion		Devon Levi, Northeastern
Len Ceglarski Sportmanship Award		Jackson Pierson, New Hampshire
Three Stars Award		Devon Levi, Northeastern
Scoring Champion		Bobby Trivigno, Massachusetts
Charlie Holt Team Sportsmanship Award		Massachusetts
Bob Kullen Award (Coach of the Year)		Jerry Keefe, Northeastern
All-Hockey East Teams
First Team	Position	Second Team
Devon Levi, Northeastern	G	Owen Savory, Massachusetts Lowell
Jordan Harris, Northeastern	D	Declan Carlile, Merrimack
Scott Morrow, Massachusetts	D	Domenick Fensore, Boston University
Aidan McDonough, Northeastern	F	Jáchym Kondelík, Connecticut
Bobby Trivigno, Massachusetts	F	Jack McBain, Boston College
Ryan Tverberg, Connecticut	F	Wilmer Skoog, Boston University
Third Team	Position	Rookie Team
Matt Murray, Massachusetts	G	Devon Levi, Northeastern
Max Crozier, Providence	D	Ty Gallagher, Boston University
Matthew Kessel, Massachusetts	D	Scott Morrow, Massachusetts
Jack St. Ivany, Boston College	D	Ryan Ufko, Massachusetts
	D	David Breazeale, Maine
Brett Berard, Providence	F	Matt Crasa, Massachusetts Lowell
Carl Berglund, Massachusetts Lowell	F	Justin Hryckowian, Northeastern
Andre Lee, Massachusetts Lowell	F	Jack Hughes, Northeastern

==== Conference tournament ====
William Flynn Tournament Most Valuable Player
Bobby Trivigno		Massachusetts
All-Tournament Team
Player	Pos	Team
Matt Murray	G	Massachusetts
John Spetz	D	Connecticut
Colin Felix	D	Massachusetts
Vladislav Firstov	F	Connecticut
Garrett Wait	F	Massachusetts
Bobby Trivigno	F	Massachusetts

== 2022 NHL entry draft ==
Round	Pick	Player	College	NHL team
1	5	Cutter Gauthier^{†}	Boston College	Philadelphia Flyers
2	34	Cameron Lund^{†}	Northeastern	San Jose Sharks
2	51	Jack Hughes	Northeastern	Los Angeles Kings
2	57	Ryan Greene^{†}	Boston University	Chicago Blackhawks
2	62	Lane Hutson^{†}	Boston University	Montreal Canadiens
3	69	Devin Kaplan^{†}	Boston University	Philadelphia Flyers
4	103	Kenny Connors^{†}	Massachusetts	Los Angeles Kings
4	114	Cole O'Hara^{†}	Massachusetts	Nashville Predators
4	126	Charles Leddy^{†}	Boston College	New Jersey Devils
4	128	Cameron Whitehead^{†}	Northeastern	Vegas Golden Knights
5	133	Alex Bump^{†}	Vermont	Philadelphia Flyers
5	143	Cameron O'Neill^{†}	Massachusetts	Ottawa Senators
6	165	Hunter McDonald^{†}	Northeastern	Philadelphia Flyers
6	170	Jake Richard^{†}	Connecticut	Buffalo Sabres
6	172	Joey Muldowney^{†}	Connecticut	San Jose Sharks
6	176	Jackson Dorrington^{†}	Northeastern	Vancouver Canucks
6	189	Tyler Muszelik^{†}	New Hampshire	Florida Panthers
6	193	Chris Romaine^{†}	Providence	Colorado Avalanche
7	195	Eli Barnett^{†}	Vermont	San Jose Sharks
7	203	James Fisher^{†}	Northeastern	Columbus Blue Jackets
7	206	Tyson Dyck^{†}	Massachusetts	Ottawa Senators
7	222	Joel Maatta	Vermont	Edmonton Oilers

† incoming freshman
