= 2021–22 Harvard Crimson men's ice hockey season =

College ice hockey season

ECAC tournament, Champion NCAA tournament, East Regional semifinal
- Conference: T–2nd ECAC Hockey
- Home ice: Bright-Landry Hockey Center

Rankings
- USCHO: 15
- USA Today: 15

Record
- Overall: 21–11–3
- Conference: 14–6–2
- Home: 13–4–0
- Road: 6–5–2
- Neutral: 2–2–1

Coaches and captains
- Head coach: Ted Donato
- Assistant coaches: Jim Tortorella; James Marcou; Brian Robinson
- Captain(s): Nick Abruzzese; Casey Dornbach

The 2021–22 Harvard Crimson Men's ice hockey season was the 121st season of play for the program. The represented Harvard University in the 2021–22 NCAA Division I men's ice hockey season and for the 60th season in the ECAC Hockey conference. The Crimson were coached by Ted Donato, in his 17th season, and played their home games at Bright-Landry Hockey Center.

== Season ==
Returning after losing an entire season to the COVID-19 pandemic, Harvard shot out of the starting gate. The team rode a hail of offensive firepower to four wins, including one over long-time rival Cornell. The Crimson swiftly found themselves ranked in the top-10, but the lofty position did not last for long. Over the succeeding four weeks, Harvard's scoring all but vanished and the team won just once in six matches. The squad did not fully recover until after the winter break but, even then, inconsistent play sent them sliding down the rankings.

Throughout the entire season, Harvard never once found itself below .500; however, the Crimson were hampered by the general weakness of their conference. While Harvard was able to recover after missing a year, many of their compatriots were near the bottom of the national rankings. This meant that conference wins were not particularly helpful while most losses were severely taxing. To make matters worse, when Harvard played in the Beanpot, the best chance for the team to gain in the PairWise, Boston College was having an unusually bad year and going winless in the tournament dealt a serious blow to Harvard's postseason hopes. Evan a win over #4 Quinnipiac near the end of the year did not markedly improve their chances and when their regular season came to a close, Harvard had no chance to make the NCAA tournament without a conference championship.

=== ECAC tournament ===
The Crimson received a bye into the quarterfinal round but the time off did not appear to help. Harvard found itself down 0–3 to Rensselaer and was unable to score at even strength. Desperate to give his team an advantage, Ted Donato was forced to pull Mitchell Gibson with about 5 minutes to play but the ploy worked. Harvard scored three times with an extra attacker, the last with just 15 seconds remaining in regulation, and tied the game. With all of the momentum now in the Crimson's favor, the team took charge in overtime and Jack Donato won the game after just a couple of minutes. The team found its position reversed in the second game when, after taking an early 2–0 lead, Harvard surrendered three consecutive goals and had to fight to tie the game for a second straight match. While they were able to do so, Rensselaer fought hard in the overtime and managed to secure the winning marker just after the start of the fifth period. In the rubber match, the defense finally put together a complete game and held the Engineers off of the scoresheet for more than 56 minutes. RPI managed to score their only goal of the game late in the third but it was not enough to overcome Harvard's lead and the Crimson escaped with a series victory.

Harvard faced Clarkson in the semifinal and came out swinging. The Crimson twice took a lead in the game but the Golden Knights quickly replied both times. By the start of the third period it appeared that Harvard was going to be sunk by taking bad penalties, but their top line surged in the final frame. Nick Abruzzese, Matthew Coronato and Sean Farrell, who had already combined for five points, spearheaded the Crimson comeback and scored three goals in the third. While the team took two more penalties, their defense held and stopped Clarkson from replying, sending the Crimson to the conference title game.

With their hopes of a postseason bid nearly achieved, Harvard had to get past the stingiest defense in the country. The team's offense was severely limited in scoring opportunities, recording just 12 shots in regulation to Quinnipiac's 42, but the Crimson were able to get two past Yaniv Perets and push the game into overtime. The opportunities were much more even in the extra session and, about mid-way through the period, Harvard's top line was again the hero when Coronato fired the winning goal from the top of the left circle.

=== NCAA tournament ===
Harvard's reward for winning their conference title was being placed opposite the #1 team in the nation, Minnesota State. The Mavericks had lost just once since late November and looked primed for a championship run. The game was playing out as expected with MSU dominating play and taking a 3–0 lead before the match was half over. The Crimson looked like they were going to be swept out of the building until Sean Farrell fired a puck from behind the goal line that deflected off of Dryden McKay and into the net. The luck break was just what the team needed and, less than a minute later, Harvard had cut the deficit to 1. Minnesota State halted the Crimson charge in the third, regaining their 2-goal edge, but Harvard would not surrender so easily. After forcing the Mavericks into a penalty in the final 5 minutes, Gibson was pulled and Casey Dornbach scored on the ensuing two-man advantage. In the final minutes, Harvard went on total attack with their goaltender sitting on the bench. Coronato twice had looks at a half-empty cage but was not able to get a shot on goal. In the end the comeback bid fell just short and Harvard's season was over.

== Departures ==
Player	Position	Nationality	Cause
Nick Azar	Defenseman	United States	Graduation (retired)
Ben Foley	Defenseman	United States	Graduation (retired)
Jackson Hartje	Defenseman	United States	Graduation (retired)
Buddy Mrowka	Defenseman	United States	Graduation (retired)
John Murray	Forward	United States	Left program (retired)
Mitchell Perrault	Forward	United States	Graduation (retired)
Ben Solin	Forward	United States	Graduation (retired)

== Recruiting ==
Player	Position	Nationality	Age	Notes
Kyle Aucoin	Defenseman	Canada	19	Ottawa, ON; selected 156th overall in 2020
Jack Bar	Defenseman	Canada	18	Newmarket, ON; selected 138th overall in 2021
Matthew Coronato	Forward	United States	18	Greenlawn, NY; selected 13th overall in 2021
Alex Gaffney	Forward	United States	19	West Orange, NJ
Christian Jimenez	Defenseman	United States	19	Yorktown Heights, NY
Zakary Karpa	Forward	United States	19	Newport Beach, CA
Luke Khozozian	Forward	United States	21	Lexington, MA; joined mid-season
Tommy Lyons	Forward	United States	21	Westwood, MA
Ian Moore	Defenseman	United States	19	Salt Lake City, UT; selected 67th overall in 2020

== Roster ==
As of September 23, 2021.

No.	Nat.	Player	Class	Pos	Height	Weight	DoB	Hometown	Previous team	NHL rights
1	(United States)	Max Miller	Sophomore	G	6' 2" (1.88 m)	180 lb (82 kg)	2001-08-02	Ann Arbor, Michigan	Janesville Jets (NAHL)	—
2	(United States)	Ian Moore	Freshman	D	6' 3" (1.91 m)	185 lb (84 kg)	2002-01-04	Concord, Massachusetts	Chicago Steel (USHL)	ANA, 67th overall 2020
3	(United States)	Henry Thrun	Junior	D	6' 2" (1.88 m)	195 lb (88 kg)	2001-03-12	Southborough, Massachusetts	Dubuque Fighting Saints (USHL)	ANA, 101 overall 2019
6	(United States)	John Fusco	Freshman	D	5' 11" (1.8 m)	180 lb (82 kg)	2001-06-13	Westwood, Massachusetts	Sioux City Musketeers (USHS–MA)	TOR, 189th overall 2020
7	(United States)	R. J. Murphy	Senior	F	6' 2" (1.88 m)	190 lb (86 kg)	1998-10-02	Needham, Massachusetts	West Kelowna Warriors (BCHL)	—
8	(United States)	Alex Gaffney	Freshman	F	5' 8" (1.73 m)	170 lb (77 kg)	2002-06-25	West Orange, New Jersey	Waterloo Black Hawks (USHL)	—
10	(United States)	Jack Donato	Senior	F	6' 2" (1.88 m)	190 lb (86 kg)	1997-09-18	Scituate, Massachusetts	South Shore Kings (NCDC)	—
14	(United States)	Jace Foskey	Junior	D	6' 2" (1.88 m)	195 lb (88 kg)	2000-06-01	Southlake, Texas	Lone Star Brahmas (NAHL)	—
15	(United States)	Luke Khozozian	Freshman	F	5' 10" (1.78 m)	180 lb (82 kg)	2001-04-21	Weston, Massachusetts	East Coast Wizards (EHL)	—
15	(United States)	Alex Laferriere	Sophomore	F	6' 0" (1.83 m)	178 lb (81 kg)	2001-10-28	Chatham, New Jersey	Des Moines Buccaneers (USHL)	LAK, 83rd overall 2020
16	(United States)	Nick Abruzzese (C)	Junior	F	5' 9" (1.75 m)	160 lb (73 kg)	1999-06-04	Slate Hill, New York	Chicago Steel (USHL)	TOR, 124th overall 2019
17	(United States)	John Farinacci	Junior	F	6' 0" (1.83 m)	185 lb (84 kg)	2001-02-14	Red Bank, New Jersey	Muskegon Lumberjacks (USHL)	ARI, 76th overall 2019
19	(United States)	Matthew Coronato	Freshman	F	5' 10" (1.78 m)	185 lb (84 kg)	2002-11-14	Greenlawn, New York	Chicago Steel (USHL)	CGY, 13th overall 2021
20	(United States)	Tommy Lyons	Freshman	F	6' 0" (1.83 m)	185 lb (84 kg)	2000-04-01	East Falmouth, Massachusetts	Chilliwack Chiefs (BCHL)	—
21	(United States)	Sean Farrell	Sophomore	F	5' 9" (1.75 m)	175 lb (79 kg)	2001-11-02	Hopkinton, Massachusetts	Chicago Steel (USHL)	MTL, 124th overall 2020
22	(United States)	Ryan Siedem	Junior	D	6' 2" (1.88 m)	192 lb (87 kg)	2001-02-25	Madison, New Jersey	Fargo Force (USHL)	—
23	(United States)	Baker Shore	Senior	F	5' 11" (1.8 m)	180 lb (82 kg)	1999-08-20	Englewood, Colorado	Chicago Steel (USHL)	—
24	(Canada)	Jack Bar	Freshman	D	6' 2" (1.88 m)	195 lb (88 kg)	2002-10-24	Newmarket, Ontario	Chicago Steel (USHL)	DAL, 138th overall 2021
26	(United States)	Ryan Drkulec	Freshman	F	6' 6" (1.98 m)	197 lb (89 kg)	2000-09-22	Mansfield, Texas	Lone Star Brahmas (NAHL)	—
27	(Canada)	Austin Wong	Junior	F	5' 11" (1.8 m)	190 lb (86 kg)	2000-08-26	Calgary, Alberta	Fargo Force (USHL)	WPG, 215th overall 2018
30	(United States)	Derek Schaedig	Senior	G	6' 4" (1.93 m)	190 lb (86 kg)	1998-05-13	Chelsea, Michigan	Lincoln Stars (USHL)	—
33	(Canada)	Kyle Aucoin	Freshman	D	6' 0" (1.83 m)	175 lb (79 kg)	2002-07-02	Ottawa, Ontario	Muskegon Lumberjacks (USHL)	DET, 156th overall 2020
35	(United States)	Derek Mullahy	Sophomore	G	6' 0" (1.83 m)	175 lb (79 kg)	2001-03-20	Scituate, Massachusetts	Des Moines Buccaneers (USHL)	—
43	(United States)	Christian Jimenez	Freshman	D	5' 9" (1.75 m)	175 lb (79 kg)	2002-03-15	Yorktown Heights, New York	Sioux City Musketeers (USHL)	—
44	(United States)	Mitchell Gibson	Junior	G	6' 1" (1.85 m)	187 lb (85 kg)	1999-06-25	Phoenixville, Pennsylvania	Central Illinois Flying Aces (USHL)	WSH, 124th overall 2018
46	(Canada)	Marshall Rifai	Senior	D	6' 1" (1.85 m)	190 lb (86 kg)	1998-03-16	Beaconsfield, Quebec	Des Moines Buccaneers (USHL)	—
47	(United States)	Casey Dornbach (C)	Senior	F	5' 11" (1.8 m)	180 lb (82 kg)	1997-07-07	Edina, Minnesota	Lincoln Stars (USHL)	—
59	(United States)	Zakary Karpa	Freshman	F	6' 2" (1.88 m)	190 lb (86 kg)	2002-03-25	Newport Beach, California	Des Moines Buccaneers (USHL)	—
96	(Canada)	Wyllum Deveaux	Senior	F	6' 2" (1.88 m)	205 lb (93 kg)	2000-08-30	Sackville, Nova Scotia	Des Moines Buccaneers (USHL)	—

== Standings ==
2021–22 ECAC Hockey Standings
	Conference record										Overall record					
	GP	W	L	T	OTW	OTL	3/SW	PTS	GF	GA	GP	W	L	T	GF	GA
#8 Quinnipiac †	22	17	4	1	0	1	1	54	71	14	42	32	7	3	139	53
#17 Clarkson	22	14	4	4	0	2	3	51	86	47	37	21	10	6	123	85
#15 Harvard *	22	14	6	2	0	0	2	46	69	46	35	21	11	3	116	82
Cornell	22	12	6	4	2	1	0	39	73	47	32	18	10	4	100	72
Colgate	22	9	9	4	1	0	3	33	55	57	40	18	18	4	111	112
Rensselaer	22	10	12	0	0	0	0	30	58	63	44	18	23	3	114	119
Union	22	9	11	2	3	1	0	27	52	66	37	14	19	4	89	110
St. Lawrence	22	7	10	5	2	0	2	26	44	60	37	11	19	7	72	110
Brown	22	6	12	4	0	1	2	25	36	61	31	7	20	4	50	100
Princeton	22	7	14	1	0	1	0	23	54	89	31	8	21	2	70	122
Yale	22	7	14	1	3	1	1	21	38	60	30	8	21	1	55	90
Dartmouth	22	5	15	2	0	3	1	21	45	71	32	7	22	3	69	110
Championship: March 19, 2022 † indicates conference regular season champion (Cleary Cup) * indicates conference tournament champion (Whitelaw Cup); Rankings: USCHO.com Top 20 Poll

== Schedule and results ==
Date	Time	Opponent^{#}	Rank^{#}	Site	TV	Decision	Result	Attendance	Record
Exhibition
October 16	7:00 PM	at Dartmouth	#14	Bright-Landry Hockey Center • Boston, Massachusetts (Exhibition)			W 4–0		—
Regular season
October 29	8:00 PM	at Dartmouth	#15	Thompson Arena • Hanover, New Hampshire		Gibson	W 9–3	1,438	1–0–0 (1–0–0)
October 30	8:00 PM	Bentley*	#15	Bright-Landry Hockey Center • Boston, Massachusetts		Gibson	W 7–3	1,357	2–0–0
November 5	7:00 PM	#15 Cornell	#13	Bright-Landry Hockey Center • Boston, Massachusetts (Rivalry)		Gibson	W 3–2	3,095	3–0–0 (2–0–0)
November 6	7:00 PM	Colgate	#13	Bright-Landry Hockey Center • Boston, Massachusetts		Mullahy	W 5–1	1,587	4–0–0 (3–0–0)
November 9	7:00 PM	at #17 Northeastern*	#10	Matthews Arena • Boston, Massachusetts		Gibson	L 1–2 ^{OT}	4,018	4–1–0
November 12	7:00 PM	at Clarkson	#10	Cheel Arena • Potsdam, New York		Gibson	L 2–6	2,526	4–2–0 (3–1–0)
November 13	7:00 PM	at St. Lawrence	#10	Appleton Arena • Canton, New York		Mullahy	T 1–1 ^{SOW}	1,816	4–2–1 (3–1–1)
November 23	7:00 PM	Brown	#16	Bright-Landry Hockey Center • Boston, Massachusetts		Gibson	W 5–2	1,498	5–2–1 (4–1–1)
November 26	7:00 PM	at New Hampshire*	#16	Bright-Landry Hockey Center • Boston, Massachusetts	NESN	Gibson	L 0–1	2,042	5–3–1
December 3	7:00 PM	at Brown	#17	Meehan Auditorium • Providence, Rhode Island		Gibson	L 0–2	2,042	5–4–1 (4–2–1)
December 4	7:00 PM	at Yale	#17	Ingalls Rink • New Haven, Connecticut (Rivalry)		Mullahy	W 5–3	1,636	6–4–1 (5–2–1)
January 2	7:00 PM	Connecticut*	#19	Bright-Landry Hockey Center • Boston, Massachusetts		Gibson	W 6–3	250	7–4–1
January 8	7:00 PM	Union	#19	Bright-Landry Hockey Center • Boston, Massachusetts		Gibson	W 4–1	250	8–4–1 (6–2–1)
January 14	7:00 PM	at #2 Quinnipiac	#18	People's United Center • Hamden, Connecticut		Gibson	L 0–3	0	8–5–1 (6–3–1)
January 21	7:00 PM	St. Lawrence	#20	Bright-Landry Hockey Center • Boston, Massachusetts		Gibson	W 4–1	250	9–5–1 (7–3–1)
January 22	7:00 PM	Clarkson	#20	Bright-Landry Hockey Center • Boston, Massachusetts		Mullahy	L 3–4	250	9–6–1 (7–4–1)
January 25	6:00 PM	Rensselaer		Bright-Landry Hockey Center • Boston, Massachusetts		Gibson	L 0–2	781	9–7–1 (7–5–1)
January 28	7:00 PM	at Colgate		Class of 1965 Arena • Hamilton, New York		Gibson	W 5–3	808	10–7–1 (8–5–1)
January 29	7:00 PM	at #8 Cornell		Lynah Rink • Ithaca, New York (Rivalry)		Gibson	T 2–2 ^{SOW}	2,133	10–7–2 (8–5–2)
February 1	7:00 PM	at Boston College*		Conte Forum • Chestnut Hill, Massachusetts		Gibson	W 6–3	3,111	11–7–2
February 4	8:00 PM	at Dartmouth		Bright-Landry Hockey Center • Boston, Massachusetts		Gibson	W 3–1	1,310	12–7–2 (9–5–2)
Beanpot
February 7	5:00 PM	vs. #20 Boston University*		TD Garden • Boston, Massachusetts (Beanpot Semifinal)	NESN	Gibson	L 3–4	1,310	12–8–2
February 11	7:00 PM	Yale		Bright-Landry Hockey Center • Boston, Massachusetts (Rivalry)		Gibson	W 2–0	2,447	13–8–2 (10–5–2)
February 14	4:30 PM	vs. Boston College*		TD Garden • Boston, Massachusetts (Beanpot consolation game)		Gibson	T 3–3 ^{OT}	17,850	13–8–3
February 18	7:00 PM	Princeton		Bright-Landry Hockey Center • Boston, Massachusetts		Gibson	W 4–3	1,335	14–8–3 (11–5–2)
February 19	7:00 PM	#4 Quinnipiac		Bright-Landry Hockey Center • Boston, Massachusetts		Gibson	W 1–0	1,823	15–8–3 (12–5–2)
February 25	7:00 PM	at Union		Achilles Rink • Schenectady, New York		Gibson	L 3–5	1,551	15–9–3 (12–6–2)
February 26	7:00 PM	at Rensselaer		Houston Field House • Troy, New York		Mullahy	W 5–1	478	16–9–3 (13–6–2)
February 27	4:00 PM	at Princeton		Hobey Baker Memorial Rink • Princeton, New Jersey		Gibson	W 3–0	1,889	17–9–3 (14–6–2)
ECAC Hockey tournament
March 11	7:00 PM	Rensselaer*		Bright-Landry Hockey Center • Boston, Massachusetts (Quarterfinal game 1)		Gibson	W 4–3 ^{OT}	778	18–9–3
March 12	7:00 PM	Rensselaer*		Bright-Landry Hockey Center • Boston, Massachusetts (Quarterfinal game 2)		Gibson	L 3–4 ^{2OT}	765	18–10–3
March 13	4:00 PM	Rensselaer*		Bright-Landry Hockey Center • Boston, Massachusetts (Quarterfinal game 3)		Gibson	W 3–1	477	19–10–3
Harvard Won Series 2–1
March 18	7:30 PM	vs. #14 Clarkson*	#17	Herb Brooks Arena • Lake Placid, New York (Semifinal)		Gibson	W 5–3	4,256	20–10–3
March 19	7:30 PM	vs. #6 Quinnipiac*	#17	Herb Brooks Arena • Lake Placid, New York (Championship)		Gibson	W 3–2 ^{OT}	4,478	21–10–3
NCAA tournament
March 24	12:00 PM	vs. #1 Minnesota State*	#15	MVP Arena • Albany, New York (East Regional semifinal)	ESPNU	Gibson	L 3–4	2,345	21–11–3
*Non-conference game. ^{#}Rankings from USCHO.com Poll. All times are in Eastern Time. Source:

== Scoring statistics ==
Name	Position	Games	Goals	Assists	Points	PIM
Matthew Coronato	LW/RW	34	18	18	36	14
Nick Abruzzese	C	28	9	24	33	8
Henry Thrun	D	35	7	25	32	10
Alex Laferriere	RW	35	14	17	31	12
Sean Farrell	C/LW	24	10	18	28	11
Casey Dornbach	F	34	8	17	25	8
Ryan Siedem	D	34	3	17	20	10
John Farinacci	C	29	10	9	19	12
Alex Gaffney	C	32	7	8	15	16
Ian Moore	D	35	2	13	15	10
Marshall Rifai	D	35	5	8	13	20
Zakary Karpa	C	33	6	6	12	6
Jack Donato	F	34	8	3	11	6
Baker Shore	RW	35	5	6	11	22
Austin Wong	C	32	2	6	8	46
Jack Bar	D	33	0	6	6	32
Wyllum Deveaux	F	25	1	1	2	8
John Fusco	D	26	1	1	2	8
Mitchell Gibson	G	30	0	2	2	2
Kyle Aucoin	D	30	0	2	2	10
Christian Jimenez	D	8	0	1	1	0
Luke Khozozian	F	1	0	0	0	0
Jace Foskey	D	3	0	0	0	0
Derek Schaedig	G	4	0	0	0	0
Ryan Drkulec	F	5	0	0	0	2
Derek Mullahy	G	10	0	0	0	0
Tommy Lyons	F	14	0	0	0	14
R. J. Murphy	C	28	0	0	0	2
Bench	-	-	-	-	-	8
Total			116	208	324	297

== Goaltending statistics ==
Name	Games	Minutes	Wins	Losses	Ties	Goals against	Saves	Shutouts	SV %	GAA
Derek Schaedig	4	7:09	0	0	0	0	2	0	1.000	0.00
Mitchell Gibson	30	1743	18	10	1	63	709	2	.918	2.17
Derek Mullahy	10	382	3	1	2	15	143	0	.905	2.36
Empty Net	-	20	-	-	-	4	-	-	-	-
Total	35	2152	21	11	3	86	854	3	.912	2.29

Note: Gibson and Schaedig shared the shutout against Princeton on February 27.

== Rankings ==
Poll	Week																									
Poll	Pre	1	2	3	4	5	6	7	8	9	10	11	12	13	14	15	16	17	18	19	20	21	22	23	24	25 (Final)
USCHO.com	16	14	14	14	15	13	10	16	16	17	20	19	19	18	20	NR	NR	NR	NR	NR	NR	NR	17	15	-	15
USA Today	11	12	12	13	14	9	6 (2)	14	15	NR	NR	NR	NR	NR	NR	NR	NR	NR	NR	NR	NR	NR	NR	15	15	15

Note: USCHO did not release a poll in week 24.

== Awards and honors ==
Player	Award	Ref
Nick Abruzzese	AHCA All-American East First Team	
Henry Thrun	AHCA All-American East Second Team	
Alex Laferriere	ECAC Hockey Rookie of the Year	
Matthew Coronato	ECAC Hockey Most Outstanding Player in Tournament	
Nick Abruzzese	ECAC Hockey First Team	
Mitchell Gibson	ECAC Hockey Second Team	
Henry Thrun	ECAC Hockey Second Team	
Alex Laferriere	ECAC Hockey Third Team	
Ian Moore	ECAC Hockey Rookie Team	
Alex Laferriere	ECAC Hockey Rookie Team	
Matthew Coronato	ECAC Hockey Rookie Team	

== Players drafted into the NHL ==
=== 2022 NHL entry draft ===
Round	Pick	Player	NHL team
3	91	Ben MacDonald^{†}	Seattle Kraken
4	121	Ryan Healey^{†}	Minnesota Wild
5	131	Matthew Morden^{†}	Arizona Coyotes
5	154	Michael Callow^{†}	Anaheim Ducks
6	191	Zakary Karpa	New York Rangers

† incoming freshman
