= 2021–22 Boston University Terriers men's ice hockey season =

Beanpot, Champion
- Conference: T–4th Hockey East
- Home ice: Agganis Arena

Rankings
- USCHO.com: NR
- USA Today: NR

Record
- Overall: 19–13–3
- Conference: 14–8–3
- Home: 8–7–2
- Road: 9–6–1
- Neutral: 2–0–0

Coaches and captains
- Head coach: Albie O'Connell
- Assistant coaches: Len Quesnelle; Jay Pandolfo
- Captain: Logan Cockerill
- Alternate captain(s): Ty Amonte; Max Kaufman; Alex Vlasic

The 2021–22 Boston University Terriers Men's ice hockey season was the 100th season of play for the program. They represented Boston University in the 2021–22 NCAA Division I men's ice hockey season and for the 38th season in the Hockey East conference. The Terriers were coached by Albie O'Connell, in his fourth season, and played their home games at Agganis Arena.

== Season ==
BU entered the season with a great deal of hope after making the NCAA tournament despite having to cancel several games as a result of COVID-19. The Terriers received a top 10 ranking in the preseason polls and were expected to compete for the Hockey East championship. When they hit the ice, however, Boston University got off to a terrible start. BU got off to a 3–7 record with their offense struggling mightily in the first month. Despite Drew Commesso playing well in goal, the Terriers scored more than two goals in just three of those contests. By mid-November the team appeared to be rounding into form but were still a middling team in their conference. Ordinarily that might not have been a terrible position to be in, however, Hockey East was having a bad season with a poor non-conference record.

While the first half of their season was disastrous to the Terrier's postseason hopes, their situation went from bad to worse in late December. During the winter break, Tyler Boucher left the team and signed a professional contract with the Ottawa Senators. In spite of losing their top prospect, however, BU came out guns blazing in the second half and won seven of their next eight games.

The winning streak was put in jeopardy when Commesso was selected to be a member of the United States national team at the 2022 Winter Olympics. The team rallied around backup Vinny Duplessis, however, and continued to pile up wins. Boston University went so far as to knock off Northeastern in the Beanpot championship, capturing their first title in seven years.

Commesso returned to campus at the end of February found his team with a top-15 ranking and a near-lock for the NCAA tournament. Unfortunately, the team faltered at the very end of the season and lost two of their last three regular season games. The defeats pushed BU down to 5th-place in the standings and below the cutoff line for at-large bids. The Terriers still had a chance to win their way into the tournament but they would need a good showing in the Hockey East playoffs. In their quarterfinal match, BU took on Connecticut and were stymied by a stellar performance from Darion Hanson. The 1–3 loss ended the Terriers' once promising season.

After the year, head coach Albie O'Connell was fired after having made the NCAA tournament just once in his four years behind the bench.

== Departures ==
Player	Position	Nationality	Cause
Tyler Boucher	Forward	United States	Left mid-season (signed with Ottawa Senators)
Jack DeBoer	Forward	United States	Transferred to Niagara
David Farrance	Defenseman	United States	Graduation (signed with Nashville Predators)
Matthew Quercia	Forward	United States	Transferred to Michigan Tech
Jake Wise	Forward	United States	Transferred to Ohio State
Jake Witkowski	Forward	United States	Graduate transfer to Canisius

== Recruiting ==
Player	Position	Nationality	Age	Notes
Tristan Amonte	Forward	United States	21	Norwell, MA
Tyler Boucher	Forward	United States	18	Scottsdale, AZ; selected 10th overall in 2021
Matt Brown	Forward	United States	22	Wood Ridge, NJ; transfer from Massachusetts Lowell
Brian Carrabes	Forward	United States	20	North Andover, MA
Braden Doyle	Defenseman	United States	20	Lynnfield, MA; selected 219th overall in 2019
Ty Gallagher	Defenseman	United States	18	Clarkston, MI; selected 217th overall in 2021

== Roster ==
As of August 12, 2021.

No.	Nat.	Player	Class	Pos	Height	Weight	DoB	Hometown	Previous team	NHL rights
2	(United States)	Case McCarthy	Junior	D	6' 1" (1.85 m)	198 lb (90 kg)	2001-01-09	Clarence Center, New York	USNTDP (USHL)	NJD, 118th overall 2019
3	(United States)	Tristan Amonte	Freshman	F	6' 0" (1.83 m)	165 lb (75 kg)	2000-02-01	Norwell, Massachusetts	Penticton Vees (BCHL)	—
4	(United States)	Ty Gallagher	Freshman	D	6' 0" (1.83 m)	188 lb (85 kg)	2003-03-06	Clarkston, Michigan	USNTDP (USHL)	BOS, 217th overall 2021
5	(United States)	Thomas Jarman	Sophomore	D	6' 3" (1.91 m)	200 lb (91 kg)	2001-04-09	Gibsonia, Pennsylvania	Maryland Black Bears (NAHL)	—
7	(United States)	Alex Vlasic (A)	Junior	D	6' 6" (1.98 m)	199 lb (90 kg)	2001-06-05	Wilmette, Illinois	USNTDP (USHL)	CHI, 43rd overall 2019
8	(United States)	Cade Webber	Sophomore	D	6' 7" (2.01 m)	215 lb (98 kg)	2001-01-05	Meadville, Pennsylvania	Penticton Vees (BCHL)	CAR, 99th overall 2019
9	(United States)	Logan Cockerill (C)	Senior	F	5' 9" (1.75 m)	175 lb (79 kg)	1999-03-03	Brighton, Michigan	USNTDP (USHL)	NYI, 201st overall 2017
10	(Canada)	Nick Zabaneh	Sophomore	F	5' 10" (1.78 m)	182 lb (83 kg)	2001-03-27	Toronto, Ontario	Green Bay Gamblers (USHL)	—
11	(United States)	Luke Tuch	Sophomore	F	6' 2" (1.88 m)	203 lb (92 kg)	2002-03-07	Baldwinsville, New York	USNTDP (USHL)	MTL, 47th overall 2020
12	(United States)	Jamie Armstrong	Junior	F	6' 2" (1.88 m)	192 lb (87 kg)	1998-08-07	Warwick, Rhode Island	Boston Junior Bruins (NCDC)	—
13	(United States)	Dylan Peterson	Sophomore	F	6' 4" (1.93 m)	192 lb (87 kg)	2002-01-08	Roseville, California	USNTDP (USHL)	STL, 86th overall 2020
14	(United States)	Sean Driscoll	Junior	D	6' 2" (1.88 m)	194 lb (88 kg)	1998-07-02	Mequon, Wisconsin	Janesville Jets (NAHL)	—
15	(Canada)	Markus Boguslavsky	Junior	F	6' 1" (1.85 m)	190 lb (86 kg)	1999-05-15	Calgary, Alberta	Drumheller Dragons (AJHL)	—
16	(United States)	Robert Mastrosimone	Junior	F	5' 10" (1.78 m)	170 lb (77 kg)	2001-01-24	East Islip, New York	Chicago Steel (USHL)	DET, 54th overall 2019
17	(United States)	Braden Doyle	Freshman	D	5' 11" (1.8 m)	170 lb (77 kg)	2001-08-24	Lynnfield, Massachusetts	Dubuque Fighting Saints (USHL)	LAK, 157th overall 2019
18	(United States)	Jay O'Brien	Junior	F	6' 0" (1.83 m)	184 lb (83 kg)	1999-11-04	Hingham, Massachusetts	Penticton Vees (BCHL)	PHI, 19th overall 2018
19	(United States)	Tyler Boucher	Freshman	F	6' 1" (1.85 m)	200 lb (91 kg)	2003-01-16	Haddonfield, New Jersey	USNTDP (USHL)	OTT, 10th overall 2021
21	(United States)	Max Kaufman (A)	Graduate	F	5' 8" (1.73 m)	165 lb (75 kg)	1996-06-26	Rochester, New York	Vermont (HEA)	—
22	(United States)	Brian Carrabes	Freshman	F	5' 10" (1.78 m)	165 lb (75 kg)	2001-08-01	North Andover, Massachusetts	Sioux City Musketeers (USHL)	—
23	(United States)	Domenick Fensore	Junior	D	5' 9" (1.75 m)	165 lb (75 kg)	2001-09-07	Thornwood, New York	USNTDP (USHL)	CAR, 90th overall 2019
25	(Canada)	Sam Stevens	Junior	F	6' 1" (1.85 m)	184 lb (83 kg)	2000-04-27	Montreal, Quebec	Sioux Falls Stampede (USHL)	—
26	(United States)	Joseph Campolieto	Senior	D	6' 0" (1.83 m)	185 lb (84 kg)	1998-04-29	Eynon, Pennsylvania	Union (ECAC)	—
27	(United States)	John Copeland	Junior	D	6' 6" (1.98 m)	181 lb (82 kg)	1999-03-03	Wellesley, Massachusetts	Carleton Place Canadians (CCHL)	—
28	(Canada)	Ethan Phillips	Junior	F	5' 10" (1.78 m)	160 lb (73 kg)	2001-05-07	Dartmouth, Nova Scotia	Sioux Falls Stampede (USHL)	DET, 97th overall 2019
29	(United States)	Drew Commesso	Sophomore	G	6' 2" (1.88 m)	180 lb (82 kg)	2002-07-19	Norwell, Massachusetts	USNTDP (USHL)	CHI, 46th overall 2020
30	(Canada)	Ashton Abel	Junior	G	6' 0" (1.83 m)	165 lb (75 kg)	1999-10-22	Fort McMurray, Alberta	Okotoks Oilers (AJHL)	—
31	(Canada)	Vinny Duplessis	Sophomore	G	6' 1" (1.85 m)	170 lb (77 kg)	1999-03-19	Quebec City, Quebec	Whitecourt Wolverines (AJHL)	—
32	(Sweden)	Wilmer Skoog	Junior	F	6' 2" (1.88 m)	197 lb (89 kg)	1999-07-17	Tyresö, Sweden	Maryland Black Bears (NAHL)	—
33	(United States)	Ty Amonte (A)	Senior	F	5' 11" (1.8 m)	175 lb (79 kg)	1998-01-11	Norwell, Massachusetts	Penticton Vees (BCHL)	—
37	(United States)	Matt Brown	Junior	F	5' 9" (1.75 m)	190 lb (86 kg)	1999-08-09	Wood-Ridge, New Jersey	Massachusetts Lowell (HEA)	—

== Standings ==
2021–22 Hockey East Standings
	Conference record										Overall record					
	GP	W	L	T	OTW	OTL	SOW	PTS	GF	GA	GP	W	L	T	GF	GA
#12 Northeastern †	24	15	8	1	1	1	1	47	68	46	39	25	13	1	99	68
#10 Massachusetts *	24	14	8	2	2	3	1	46	77	54	37	22	13	2	117	88
#13 Massachusetts Lowell	24	15	8	1	1	0	1	46	62	48	35	21	11	3	102	74
#19 Connecticut	24	14	10	0	2	1	0	41	73	61	36	20	16	0	109	89
Boston University	24	13	8	3	3	2	0	41	69	58	35	19	13	3	107	89
Merrimack	24	13	11	0	1	3	0	41	70	70	35	19	15	1	109	99
#20 Providence	24	12	11	1	1	1	1	38	61	52	38	22	14	2	118	82
Boston College	24	9	12	3	0	1	1	32	67	77	38	15	18	5	114	123
New Hampshire	24	8	15	1	2	2	0	25	47	71	34	14	19	1	76	95
Vermont	24	6	16	2	3	1	2	20	41	72	35	8	25	2	59	101
Maine	24	5	17	2	2	3	1	19	54	80	33	7	22	4	74	111
Championship: March 19, 2022 † indicates regular season champion * indicates conference tournament champion (Lamoriello Trophy); Rankings: USCHO.com Top 20 Poll

== Schedule and results ==
Date	Time	Opponent^{#}	Rank^{#}	Site	TV	Decision	Result	Attendance	Record
Exhibition
October 2	7:30 PM	Holy Cross*	#10	Walter Brown Arena • Boston, Massachusetts (Exhibition)			W 6–1	1,922	
Regular Season
October 8	7:05 PM	at Connecticut	#10	XL Center • Hartford, Connecticut		Commesso	W 2–1	3,084	1–0–0 (1–0–0)
October 9	7:00 PM	Connecticut	#10	Agganis Arena • Boston, Massachusetts		Commesso	L 1–5	3,533	1–1–0 (1–1–0)
October 15	7:30 PM	Sacred Heart*	#12	Agganis Arena • Boston, Massachusetts		Commesso	L 2–3	3,158	1–2–0
October 16	7:00 PM	at Sacred Heart*	#12	Agganis Arena • Boston, Massachusetts		Commesso	W 4–1	3,201	2–2–0
October 22	7:00 PM	Merrimack	#16	J. Thom Lawler Rink • North Andover, Massachusetts		Commesso	L 2–3	2,174	2–3–0 (1–2–0)
October 23	7:00 PM	Merrimack	#16	Agganis Arena • Boston, Massachusetts		Commesso	W 8–6	5,339	3–3–0 (2–2–0)
October 29	7:30 PM	Massachusetts Lowell	#19	Agganis Arena • Boston, Massachusetts		Commesso	L 0–3	2,941	3–4–0 (2–3–0)
October 30	7:30 PM	at Massachusetts Lowell	#19	Tsongas Center • Lowell, Massachusetts		Commesso	L 1–2	4,363	3–5–0 (2–4–0)
November 5	6:37 PM	at Northern Michigan*		Berry Events Center • Marquette, Michigan		Commesso	L 3–5	3,650	3–6–0
November 6	6:37 PM	at Northern Michigan*		Berry Events Center • Marquette, Michigan		Duplessis	L 2–6	3,219	3–7–0
November 12	7:30 PM	#8 Massachusetts		Agganis Arena • Boston, Massachusetts		Commesso	T 2–2 ^{SOL}	4,149	3–7–1 (2–4–1)
November 13	7:00 PM	at #8 Massachusetts		Mullins Center • Amherst, Massachusetts	NESN	Commesso	W 4–3 ^{OT}	5,741	4–7–1 (3–4–1)
November 19	7:30 PM	#18 Northeastern		Agganis Arena • Boston, Massachusetts		Commesso	L 0–1 ^{OT}	4,482	4–8–1 (3–5–1)
November 20	7:00 PM	at #18 Northeastern		Matthews Arena • Boston, Massachusetts	NESN+	Commesso	T 2–2 ^{SOL}	4,703	4–8–2 (3–5–2)
November 27	8:00 PM	vs. #10 Cornell*		Madison Square Garden • New York, New York (Red Hot Hockey)		Commesso	L 4–6	0	4–9–2
December 3	7:30 PM	New Hampshire		Agganis Arena • Boston, Massachusetts		Commesso	W 3–1	3,123	5–9–2 (4–5–2)
December 4	7:00 PM	at New Hampshire		Whittemore Center • Durham, New Hampshire		Commesso	W 2–1 ^{OT}	5,021	6–9–2 (5–5–2)
December 10	7:30 PM	Boston College		Agganis Arena • Boston, Massachusetts (Rivalry)	NESN	Commesso	T 3–3 ^{SOL}	6,150	6–9–3 (5–5–3)
December 11		USNTDP		Agganis Arena • Boston, Massachusetts (Exhibition)			L 3–4		
December 31	2:00 PM	at Brown*		Meehan Auditorium • Providence, Rhode Island		Duplessis	W 5–1	473	7–9–3
January 7	7:30 PM	Arizona State*		Agganis Arena • Boston, Massachusetts		Commesso	W 7–1	2,539	8–9–3
January 8	7:00 PM	Arizona State*		Agganis Arena • Boston, Massachusetts	NESN+	Commesso	W 5–2	1,991	9–9–3
January 14	7:05 PM	at Connecticut		XL Center • Hartford, Connecticut		Commesso	W 2–1 ^{OT}	3,596	10–9–3 (6–5–3)
January 21	7:00 PM	Vermont		Agganis Arena • Boston, Massachusetts	NESN+	Commesso	L 1–2 ^{OT}	3,191	10–10–3 (6–6–3)
January 22	4:00 PM	Vermont		Agganis Arena • Boston, Massachusetts		Commesso	W 4–0	3,294	11–10–3 (7–6–3)
January 25	7:00 PM	at #9 Massachusetts		Mullins Center • Amherst, Massachusetts	NESN	Commesso	W 6–4	6,269	12–10–3 (8–6–3)
January 30	3:00 PM	#17 Providence		Agganis Arena • Boston, Massachusetts	NESN	Commesso	W 5–2	2,228	13–10–3 (9–6–3)
February 4	7:30 PM	Maine	#19	Agganis Arena • Boston, Massachusetts (Rivalry)		Duplessis	W 4–0	2,343	14–10–3 (10–6–3)
Beanpot
February 7	5:00 PM	vs. Harvard*	#20	TD Garden • Boston, Massachusetts (Beanpot Semifinal)	NESN	Duplessis	W 4–3	0	15–10–3
February 11	7:00 PM	at #17 Providence	#20	Schneider Arena • Providence, Rhode Island	NESN+	Duplessis	W 4–1	2,394	16–10–3 (11–6–3)
February 14	7:30 PM	vs. #13 Northeastern*	#17	TD Garden • Boston, Massachusetts (Beanpot Championship)	NESN	Duplessis	W 1–0	17,850	17–10–3 (12–6–3)
February 25	7:00 PM	Boston College	#13	Agganis Arena • Boston, Massachusetts (Rivalry)	NESN	Duplessis	W 6–3	6,007	18–10–3 (13–6–3)
February 27	4:00 PM	at Boston College	#13	Conte Forum • Chestnut Hill, Massachusetts (Rivalry)	NESN	Commesso	L 1–3	5,208	18–11–3 (13–7–3)
March 4	7:30 PM	at Maine	#14	Alfond Arena • Orono, Maine		Commesso	W 5–1	3,226	19–11–3 (14–7–3)
March 5	7:30 PM	at Maine	#14	Alfond Arena • Orono, Maine		Commesso	L 1–8	3,651	19–12–3 (14–8–3)
Hockey East Tournament
March 12	7:00 PM	at Connecticut*	#16	XL Center • Hartford, Connecticut (Quarterfinal)		Commesso	L 1–3	3,416	19–13–3
*Non-conference game. ^{#}Rankings from USCHO.com Poll. All times are in Eastern Time. Source:

== Scoring statistics ==
Name	Position	Games	Goals	Assists	Points	PIM
Domenick Fensore	D	35	5	26	31	8
Wilmer Skoog	C	35	15	15	30	20
Robert Mastrosimone	C/LW	34	11	14	25	28
Jay O'Brien	C	24	10	12	22	38
Matt Brown	LW	24	7	10	17	4
Ethan Phillips	C/RW	28	6	11	17	12
Dylan Peterson	C	29	10	6	16	18
Ty Gallagher	D	34	5	11	16	35
Case McCarthy	D	26	5	9	14	20
Max Kaufman	F	34	6	5	11	12
Logan Cockerill	LW/RW	30	5	6	11	8
Luke Tuch	LW	26	6	4	10	16
Nicholas Zabaneh	C	30	1	9	10	14
Brian Carrabes	F	24	4	4	8	4
Alex Vlasic	D	32	1	7	8	31
Sam Stevens	F	31	5	2	7	14
Jamie Armstrong	LW	26	1	5	6	12
Ty Amonte	RW	22	1	4	5	18
Joseph Campolieto	D	29	0	5	5	6
Tyler Boucher	LW/RW	17	2	1	3	34
Tristan Amonte	D	17	1	2	3	10
Cade Webber	D	31	0	2	2	8
Braden Doyle	D	8	0	1	1	0
John Copeland	F/D	18	0	1	1	2
Jack Page	D	1	0	0	0	0
Ashton Abel	G	2	0	0	0	0
Sean Driscoll	D	3	0	0	0	0
Thomas Jarman	D	3	0	0	0	0
Markus Boguslavsky	RW	5	0	0	0	15
Vinny Duplessis	G	10	0	0	0	0
Drew Commesso	G	28	0	0	0	0
Total			107	172	279	387

== Goaltending statistics ==
Name	Games	Minutes	Wins	Losses	Ties	Goals against	Saves	Shut outs	SV %	GAA
Vinny Duplessis	17	517	6	2	0	18	194	2	.915	2.09
Drew Commesso	28	1595	13	11	3	67	715	1	.914	2.52
Empty Net	-	14	-	-	-	4	-	-	-	-
Total	35	2126	19	13	3	89	909	3	.911	2.51

== Rankings ==
Poll	Week																									
Poll	Pre	1	2	3	4	5	6	7	8	9	10	11	12	13	14	15	16	17	18	19	20	21	22	23	24	25 (Final)
USCHO.com	10	10	12	16	19	NR	NR	NR	NR	NR	NR	NR	NR	NR	NR	NR	19	20	17	13	14	16	18	NR	-	NR
USA Today	10	10	15	NR	NR	NR	NR	NR	NR	NR	NR	NR	NR	NR	NR	NR	NR	NR	NR	14	14	NR	NR	NR	NR	NR

Note: USCHO did not release a poll in week 24.

== Awards and honors ==
Player	Award	Ref
Domenick Fensore	Hockey East Second Team	
Wilmer Skoog	Hockey East Second Team	
Ty Gallagher	Hockey East Rookie Team	

== Players drafted into the NHL ==
=== 2022 NHL entry draft ===
Round	Pick	Player	NHL team
2	57	Ryan Greene^{†}	Chicago Blackhawks
2	62	Lane Hutson^{†}	Montreal Canadiens
3	69	Devin Kaplan^{†}	Philadelphia Flyers

† incoming freshman
