= 2021–22 Boston College Eagles men's ice hockey season =

Ice Breaker Tournament (East), Champion Ledyard Bank Classic, Champion
- Conference: 8th Hockey East
- Home ice: Kelley Rink

Rankings
- USCHO.com: RV (Final)
- USA Today: NR (Final)

Record
- Overall: 15–18–5
- Conference: 9–12–3
- Home: 7–9–1
- Road: 6–8–2
- Neutral: 2–1–2

Coaches and captains
- Head coach: Jerry York
- Assistant coaches: Mike Ayers; Brendan Buckley; Brooks Orpik
- Captain: Marc McLaughlin
- Alternate captain(s): Patrick Giles; Jack McBain

The 2021–22 Boston College Eagles men's ice hockey team represented Boston College in the 2021–22 NCAA Division I men's ice hockey season. The team was coached by Jerry York, '67, his 28th season behind the bench at Boston College. The Eagles played their home games at Kelley Rink on the campus of Boston College, competing in Hockey East. It was the 100th season of play for the program, and the 38th season in the Hockey East conference.

== Previous season recap ==
The Eagles entered the 2021–22 season following a strong 2020–21 effort. With a 17–6–1 record, going 16–4–1 in conference play, the Eagles finished first in Hockey East for a second straight year and returned to the NCAA tournament for the first time since 2016. Despite clinching the top seed in the conference, no regular season trophy was awarded due to disparate scheduling among the league. The Eagles advanced to the Semifinals of the Hockey East tournament where they fell in double overtime to the UMass Lowell River Hawks. Earning a top seed in the NCAA Northeast Regional, the Eagles fell in the Regional final to the St. Cloud State Huskies. No mid-season tournaments were held due to the COVID-19 pandemic.

== Departures ==
Eleven Eagles departed from the program from the 2020–21 roster:

Graduation:

- Adan Farhat, Senior – G
- Logan Hutkso, Senior – F (Signed with his drafted team, the Florida Panthers on March 1, 2021)
- Michael Karow, Senior – D (Transferred to Michigan Tech as a Graduate)

Left program early to sign professionally:

- Matt Boldy, Sophomore – F (Signed with his drafted team, the Minnesota Wild on March 31, 2021)
- Alex Newhook, Sophomore – F (Signed with his drafted team, the Colorado Avalanche on March 31, 2021)
- Mike Hardman, Sophomore – F (Signed as a free agent with the Chicago Blackhawks on March 30, 2021)
- Spencer Knight, Sophomore – G (Signed with his drafted team, the Florida Panthers on March 31, 2021)

Transferred:

- Tim Lovell, Freshman – D (Arizona State)
- Jack Agnew, Freshman – D (RPI)
- Danny Weight, Freshman – F (Colorado College)
- Harrison Roy, Freshman – F (Lake Superior State)

== Recruiting ==
Boston College added six freshmen for the 2021–22 season: four forwards and two defensemen. Additionally, four graduate transfers were added to the roster – three from Bowling Green and one from Penn State – consisting of two forwards, one defenseman and one goalie.

Player	Position	Nationality	Notes
Cade Alami	Defenseman	United States	Bedford, NY; Played for the Jersey Hitmen of the NCDC.
Matt Argentina	Forward	United States	Philadelphia, PA; Played for the Waterloo Black Hawks of the USHL.
Jack Dempsey	Forward	United States	Natick, MA; Played for the Boston Junior Bruins of the NCDC.
Aidan Hreschuk	Defenseman	United States	Long Beach, CA; Played for the US National Development Team of the USHL. Selected 94th overall by the Carolina Hurricanes in the 2021 NHL Draft.
Connor Joyce	Forward	United States	Dedham, MA; Played for the Connecticut Junior Rangers of the NCDC.
Mike Posma	Forward	United States	Pomona, NY; Played for the Omaha Lancers of the USHL.

Player	Position	Nationality	Notes
Eric Dop	Goaltender	United States	Lewis Center, OH; Transferred from Bowling Green of the WCHA.
Brandon Kruse	Forward	United States	Saline, MI; Transferred from Bowling Green of the WCHA. Selected 135th overall by the Vegas Golden Knights in the 2018 NHL Draft.
Sam Sternschein	Forward	United States	Syosset, NY; Transferred from Penn State of the Big Ten.
Justin Wells	Defenseman	United States	North Canton, OH; Transferred from Bowling Green of the WCHA.

== Roster ==
As of September 6, 2021.

No.	Nat.	Player	Class	Pos	Height	Weight	DoB	Hometown	Previous team	NHL rights
2	(United States)	Eamon Powell	Sophomore	D	5' 11" (1.8 m)	165 lb (75 kg)	2002-05-10	Marcellus, New York	USNTDP (USHL)	TBL, 116th overall 2020
3	(United States)	Jack St. Ivany	Senior	D	6' 3" (1.91 m)	200 lb (91 kg)	1999-07-22	Manhattan Beach, California	Yale (ECAC)	PHI, 112th overall 2018
4	(United States)	Drew Helleson	Junior	D	6' 3" (1.91 m)	190 lb (86 kg)	2001-03-26	Farmington, Minnesota	USNTDP (USHL)	COL, 47th overall 2019
5	(United States)	Marshall Warren	Junior	D	5' 11" (1.8 m)	175 lb (79 kg)	2001-04-20	Laurel Hollow, New York	USNTDP (USHL)	MIN, 166th overall 2019
6	(United States)	Cade Alami	Freshman	D	6' 7" (2.01 m)	216 lb (98 kg)	2001-03-13	Bedford, New York	Jersey Hitmen (NCDC)	—
7	(United States)	Aidan Hreschuk	Freshman	D	5' 11" (1.8 m)	187 lb (85 kg)	2003-02-19	Long Beach, California	USNTDP (USHL)	CAR, 94th overall 2021
8	(United States)	Justin Wells	Graduate	D	6' 4" (1.93 m)	201 lb (91 kg)	1998-07-31	North Canton, Ohio	Bowling Green (WCHA)	—
9	(United States)	Jack Dempsey	Freshman	F	6' 4" (1.93 m)	205 lb (93 kg)	2001-05-17	Natick, Massachusetts	Boston Junior Bruins (NCDC)	—
10	(United States)	Mitch Andres	Junior	D	6' 1" (1.85 m)	195 lb (88 kg)	1998-09-02	Brainerd, Minnesota	Chilliwack Chiefs (BCHL)	—
11	(Canada)	Jack McBain	Senior	F	6' 4" (1.93 m)	215 lb (98 kg)	2000-01-06	Toronto, Ontario	Toronto Jr. Canadiens (OJHL)	MIN, 63rd overall 2018
12	(United States)	Mike Posma	Freshman	F	6' 0" (1.83 m)	194 lb (88 kg)	2001-12-04	Pomona, New York	Omaha Lancers (USHL)	—
13	(United States)	Nikita Nesterenko	Sophomore	F	6' 2" (1.88 m)	176 lb (80 kg)	2001-09-10	Brooklyn, New York	Chilliwack (BCHL)	MIN, 172nd overall 2019
14	(United States)	Gentry Shamburger	Sophomore	F	6' 0" (1.83 m)	206 lb (93 kg)	2000-09-29	Atlanta, Georgia	Avon Old Farms (USHS–CT)	—
15	(United States)	Trevor Kuntar	Sophomore	F	6' 0" (1.83 m)	195 lb (88 kg)	2001-06-20	Buffalo, New York	Youngstown Phantoms (USHL)	BOS, 89th overall 2020
18	(United States)	Brandon Kruse	Graduate	F	5' 9" (1.75 m)	154 lb (70 kg)	1999-02-26	Saline, Michigan	Bowling Green (WCHA)	VGK, 135th overall 2018
19	(United States)	Sam Sternschein	Graduate	F	6' 2" (1.88 m)	205 lb (93 kg)	1998-04-27	Syosset, New York	Penn State (Big Ten)	—
20	(United States)	Connor Joyce	Freshman	F	6' 0" (1.83 m)	170 lb (77 kg)	2001-07-06	Dedham, Massachusetts	Connecticut Jr. Rangers (NCDC)	—
22	(United States)	Casey Carreau	Senior	F	5' 9" (1.75 m)	192 lb (87 kg)	1998-03-08	Acushnet, Massachusetts	Boston Junior Bruins (NCDC)	—
24	(United States)	Patrick Giles (A)	Senior	F	6' 5" (1.96 m)	212 lb (96 kg)	2000-01-03	Chevy Chase, Maryland	USNTDP (USHL)	—
25	(United States)	Marc McLaughlin (C)	Senior	F	6' 0" (1.83 m)	205 lb (93 kg)	1999-07-26	North Billerica, Massachusetts	Cedar Rapids RoughRiders (USHL)	—
26	(Canada)	Liam Izyk	Junior	F	6' 1" (1.85 m)	185 lb (84 kg)	1998-12-27	Blackie, Alberta	Alabama Huntsville (WCHA)	—
27	(Canada)	Colby Ambrosio	Sophomore	F	5' 9" (1.75 m)	165 lb (75 kg)	2002-08-07	Welland, Ontario	Tri-City Storm (USHL)	COL, 118th overall 2020
28	(United States)	Matt Argentina	Freshman	F	5' 10" (1.78 m)	187 lb (85 kg)	2003-01-16	Philadelphia, Pennsylvania	Waterloo Black Hawks (USHL)	—
29	(United States)	Eric Dop	Graduate	G	5' 10" (1.78 m)	160 lb (73 kg)	1998-08-23	Lewis Center, Ohio	Bowling Green (WCHA)	—
31	(United States)	Henry Wilder	Sophomore	G	6' 0" (1.83 m)	181 lb (82 kg)	2001-03-19	Needham, Massachusetts	Hotchkiss School (USHS–CT)	—
32	(United States)	Jack Moffatt	Junior	G	6' 3" (1.91 m)	200 lb (91 kg)	2001-01-08	Wellesley, Massachusetts	Saint Sebastian's School (USHS–MA)	—

=== Coaching staff ===
Name	Position	Seasons at Boston College	Alma mater
Jerry York	Head Coach	28th	Boston College (1967)
Mike Ayers	Associate Head Coach	9th	University of New Hampshire (2004)
Brendan Buckley	Associate Head Coach	4th	Boston College (1999)
Brooks Orpik	Assistant Coach	2nd	Boston College (2001)

== Standings ==
2021–22 Hockey East Standings
	Conference record										Overall record					
	GP	W	L	T	OTW	OTL	SOW	PTS	GF	GA	GP	W	L	T	GF	GA
#12 Northeastern †	24	15	8	1	1	1	1	47	68	46	39	25	13	1	99	68
#10 Massachusetts *	24	14	8	2	2	3	1	46	77	54	37	22	13	2	117	88
#13 Massachusetts Lowell	24	15	8	1	1	0	1	46	62	48	35	21	11	3	102	74
#19 Connecticut	24	14	10	0	2	1	0	41	73	61	36	20	16	0	109	89
Boston University	24	13	8	3	3	2	0	41	69	58	35	19	13	3	107	89
Merrimack	24	13	11	0	1	3	0	41	70	70	35	19	15	1	109	99
#20 Providence	24	12	11	1	1	1	1	38	61	52	38	22	14	2	118	82
Boston College	24	9	12	3	0	1	1	32	67	77	38	15	18	5	114	123
New Hampshire	24	8	15	1	2	2	0	25	47	71	34	14	19	1	76	95
Vermont	24	6	16	2	3	1	2	20	41	72	35	8	25	2	59	101
Maine	24	5	17	2	2	3	1	19	54	80	33	7	22	4	74	111
Championship: March 19, 2022 † indicates regular season champion * indicates conference tournament champion (Lamoriello Trophy); Rankings: USCHO.com Top 20 Poll

== Schedule ==
Date	Time	Opponent^{#}	Rank^{#}	Site	TV	Decision	Result	Attendance	Record
Exhibition
October 2	4:00 PM	#20 American International*	#7	Conte Forum • Chestnut Hill, Massachusetts (Exhibition)		Dop	W 4–1	567	0–0–0
Regular season
October 8	4:30 PM	vs. #9 Quinnipiac*	#6	DCU Center • Worcester, Massachusetts (Ice Breaker Game 1)	NESN+	Dop	T 2–2 ^{SOW}	N/A	0–0–1
October 9	7:30 PM	vs. Holy Cross*	#6	DCU Center • Worcester, Massachusetts (Ice Breaker Game 2)	NESN	Wilder	W 5–1	2,052	1–0–1
October 15	7:00 PM	#18 Northeastern	#6	Conte Forum • Chestnut Hill, Massachusetts	NESN+	Dop	W 5–3	7,288	2–0–1 (1–0–0)
October 16	7:00 PM	at Bentley*	#6	Bentley Arena • Waltham, Massachusetts		Wilder	L 2–6	2,150	2–1–1
October 22	7:00 PM	Colorado College*	#10	Conte Forum • Chestnut Hill, Massachusetts	NESN+	Dop	L 3–5	5,242	2–2–1
October 23	7:00 PM	#8 Denver*	#10	Conte Forum • Chestnut Hill, Massachusetts	NESN	Dop	W 5–1	4,546	3–2–1
October 29	7:00 PM	at Vermont	#9	Gutterson Fieldhouse • Burlington, Vermont		Dop	L 4–5 ^{OT}	2,770	3–3–1 (1–1–0)
October 30	7:00 PM	at Vermont	#9	Gutterson Fieldhouse • Burlington, Vermont		Dop	W 3–2	2,928	4–3–1 (2–1–0)
November 5	7:00 PM	at Merrimack	#14	J. Thom Lawler Rink • North Andover, Massachusetts		Dop	W 4–1	2,314	5–3–1 (3–1–0)
November 6	4:00 PM	Merrimack	#14	Conte Forum • Chestnut Hill, Massachusetts		Dop	L 3–4	4,246	5–4–1 (3–2–0)
November 12	7:00 PM	at UConn	#16	XL Center • Hartford, Connecticut		Dop	W 2–1	5,694	6–4–1 (4–2–0)
November 13	6:00 PM	at #20 UMass Lowell	#16	Tsongas Center • Lowell, Massachusetts		Dop	L 2–4	5,215	6–5–1 (4–3–0)
November 18	7:00 PM	Maine	#19	Conte Forum • Chestnut Hill, Massachusetts	NESN	Dop	W 6–2	3,177	7–5–1 (5–3–0)
November 19	7:00 PM	Maine	#19	Conte Forum • Chestnut Hill, Massachusetts	NESN+	Dop	T 2–2 ^{SOL}	4,224	7–5–2 (5–3–1)
December 7	7:00 PM	Brown*		Conte Forum • Chestnut Hill, Massachusetts	NESN	Dop	W 5–2	2,597	8–5–2
December 10	7:30 PM	at Boston University		Agganis Arena • Boston, Massachusetts (Green Line Rivalry)	NESN	Dop	T 3–3 ^{SOW}	6,150	8–5–3 (5–3–2)
December 30	4:00 PM	vs. Mercyhurst*	#20	Thompson Arena • Hanover, New Hampshire (Ledyard Bank Semifinal)		Wilder	W 4–2	87	9–5–3
December 31	7:30 PM	vs. Dartmouth*	#20	Thompson Arena • Hanover, New Hampshire (Ledyard Bank Final)		Wilder	W 6–1	48	10–5–3
January 8	4:00 PM	UConn	#18	Conte Forum • Chestnut Hill, Massachusetts	NESN+	Dop	L 4–5	3,524	10–6–3 (5–4–2)
January 14	7:00 PM	at New Hampshire	#20	Whittemore Center • Durham, New Hampshire	NESN	Wilder	L 2–3	4,873	10–7–3 (5–5–2)
January 15	7:00 PM	New Hampshire	#20	Conte Forum • Chestnut Hill, Massachusetts		Dop	L 2–5	3,408	10–8–3 (5–6–2)
January 19	7:00 PM	at #13 Notre Dame*		Compton Family Ice Arena • Notre Dame, Indiana (Holy War on Ice)		Wilder	L 2–8	4,124	10–9–3
January 21	7:00 PM	#18 Providence		Conte Forum • Chestnut Hill, Massachusetts		Dop	L 0–7	5,390	10–10–3 (5–7–2)
January 22	6:30 PM	at #18 Providence		Schneider Arena • Providence, Rhode Island	NESN	Dop	T 1–1 ^{SOL}	3,187	10–10–4 (5–7–3)
January 28	7:30 PM	at Maine		Alfond Arena • Orono, Maine		Dop	L 1–4	3,369	10–11–4 (5–8–3)
February 1	7:00 PM	Harvard*		Conte Forum • Chestnut Hill, Massachusetts		Dop	L 3–6	3,111	10–12–4
February 4	7:00 PM	#14 UMass Lowell		Conte Forum • Chestnut Hill, Massachusetts		Dop	L 2–3	3,843	10–13–4 (5–9–3)
February 7	8:00 PM	vs. #15 Northeastern*		TD Garden • Boston, Massachusetts (Beanpot Semifinal)	NESN	Dop	L 1–3	15,535	10–14–4
February 11	7:00 PM	UConn		Conte Forum • Chestnut Hill, Massachusetts	NESN+	Dop	L 4–6	3,024	10–15–4 (5–10–3)
February 14	4:30 PM	vs. Harvard*		TD Garden • Boston, Massachusetts (Beanpot Consolation)		Dop	T 3–3 ^{OT}	17,850	10–15–5
February 18	7:00 PM	at #13 Northeastern		Matthews Arena • Boston, Massachusetts	NESN+	Dop	W 4–1	1,955	11–15–5 (6–10–3)
February 19	7:00 PM	#13 Northeastern		Conte Forum • Chestnut Hill, Massachusetts		Dop	L 1–4	5,163	11–16–5 (6–11–3)
February 26	6:30 PM	at #13 Boston University		Agganis Arena • Boston, Massachusetts (Green Line Rivalry)	NESN	Dop	L 3–6	6,007	11–17–5 (6–12–3)
February 27	4:00 PM	#13 Boston University		Conte Forum • Chestnut Hill, Massachusetts (Green Line Rivalry)	NESN	Dop	W 3–1	5,208	12–17–5 (7–12–3)
March 4	7:00 PM	#9 Massachusetts		Conte Forum • Chestnut Hill, Massachusetts	NESN	Dop	W 2–1	5,524	13–17–5 (8–12–3)
March 5	4:30 PM	at #9 Massachusetts		Mullins Center • Amherst, Massachusetts	NESN+	Dop	W 4–3	5,736	14–17–5 (9–12–3)
Hockey East Tournament
March 9	7:00 PM	New Hampshire*		Conte Forum • Chestnut Hill, Massachusetts (Opening Round)	NESN	Dop	W 4–3 ^{OT}	1,125	15–17–5
March 12	7:30 PM	at #11 Northeastern*		Matthews Arena • Boston, Massachusetts (Quarterfinals)	NESN+	Dop	L 2–3	2,304	15–18–5
*Non-conference game. ^{#}Rankings from USCHO.com Poll. All times are in Eastern Time. Source:

- Games against Notre Dame and Harvard, originally scheduled for November 26 and 30, respectively, were postponed due to COVID-19 Protocols within the Eagles men's hockey program. The road game against Notre Dame was rescheduled to January 19 and the home against Harvard to February 1.
- The February 25 match against Boston University was postponed to February 27, due to inclement winter weather.

== Rankings ==
Poll	Week																									
Poll	Pre	1	2	3	4	5	6	7	8	9	10	11	12	13	14	15	16	17	18	19	20	21	22	23	24	25 (Final)
USCHO.com	7	6	6	10	9	14	16	19	19	20	RV	20	18	20	RV	NR	NR	NR	NR	NR	NR	RV	RV	NR	—	RV
USA Today	8	8	7	10	13	15	RV	RV	RV	RV	NR	RV	RV	NR	NR	NR	NR	NR	NR	NR	NR	NR	NR	NR	NR	NR

Note: USCHO did not release a poll in week 24.

== Statistics ==
As of January 1, 2022

=== Skaters ===
No.	Player	POS	YR	GP	G	A	Pts	PIM	PP	SHG	GWG	+/-	SOG
2	Eamon Powell	D	SO	38	0	9	9	4	0	0	0	+4	30
3	Jack St. Ivany	D	SR	38	4	20	24	6	1	0	0	+8	84
4	Drew Helleson	D	JR	32	4	21	25	30	2	0	2	–9	62
5	Marshall Warren	D	JR	37	6	15	21	12	0	1	1	–3	106
6	Cade Alami	D	FR	10	0	1	1	2	0	0	0	–2	4
7	Aidan Hreschuk	D	FR	37	1	7	8	23	0	0	0	+9	37
8	Justin Wells	D	GR	37	0	3	3	4	0	0	0	–4	23
9	Jack Dempsey	F	FR	12	0	2	2	4	0	0	0	–1	6
10	Mitch Andres	D	JR	32	0	2	2	0	0	0	0	–7	9
11	Jack McBain	F	SR	24	19	14	33	14	6	1	4	+13	81
12	Mike Posma	F	FR	28	3	6	9	27	0	0	0	–9	48
13	Nikita Nesterenko	F	SO	37	7	17	24	50	0	1	0	+7	77
14	Gentry Shamburger	F	SO	29	1	0	1	4	0	0	0	–7	10
15	Trevor Kuntar	F	SO	36	9	11	20	33	1	0	3	+2	106
18	Brandon Kruse	F	GR	38	3	23	26	18	0	0	0	–4	54
19	Sam Sternschein	F	GR	24	0	3	3	21	0	0	0	–7	25
20	Connor Joyce	F	FR	35	0	3	3	2	0	0	0	–8	31
22	Casey Carreau	D	SR	36	6	6	12	21	1	1	0	–10	68
24	Patrick Giles	F	SR	37	15	7	22	26	1	2	2	+3	85
25	Marc McLaughlin	F	SR	33	21	10	31	22	8	1	2	+10	92
26	Liam Izyk	F	JR	24	4	3	7	10	0	0	0	–4	25
27	Colby Ambrosio	F	SO	38	9	13	22	8	1	0	1	+7	99
28	Matt Argentina	F	FR	29	2	3	5	44	0	0	0	–8	17
29	Eric Dop	G	GR	33	0	1	1	0	0	0	0	E	0
31	Henry Wilder	G	SO	7	0	0	0	0	0	0	0	E	0
32	Jack Moffatt	G	JR	0	0	0	0	0	0	0	0	E	0
	Bench							2					
	Team			38	114	200	314	387	22	6	15	+1	1179

=== Goaltenders ===
No.	Player	YR	GS	GP	MIN	W	L	T	GA	GAA	SA	SV	SV%	SO
29	Eric Dop	GR	32	33	1930	12	15	5	96	2.98	961	865	0.900	0
31	Henry Wilder	SO	6	7	371	3	3	0	19	3.07	172	153	0.890	0
32	Jack Moffatt	JR	0	0	0	0	0	0	0	0.00	0	0	1.00	0
	Empty Net								5		5			
	Team		38	38	2301	15	18	5	120	3.13	1138	1018	0.895	0

== Awards and honors ==
Hockey East All-Stars

- Jack McBain, F – Second Team
- Jack St. Ivany, D – Third Team
- Marc McLaughlin, F – Honorable Mention

Hockey East Player of the Month

- Jack McBain, F – Month of October
- Marc McLaughlin, F – Month of December

Hockey East Defender of the Month

- Jack St. Ivany, D – Month of December

Hockey East Player of the Week

- Marshall Warren, D – Week of October 11, 2021
- Jack McBain, F – Week of November 1, 2021 (Shared with Philip Lagunov, Vermont), Week of January 4, 2022 (Shared with Jamie Engelbert, Providence)
- Marc McLaughlin, F – Week of December 13, 2021

Hockey East Goaltender of the Week

- Henry Wilder, G – Week of January 4, 2022
- Eric Dop, G – Week of March 8, 2022

Player	Award	Ref
Jack McBain	AHCA All-American East Second Team	
Jack McBain	Hockey East Second Team	
Jack St. Ivany	Hockey East Third Team	

== Players drafted into the NHL ==
=== 2022 NHL entry draft ===
Round	Pick	Player	NHL team
1	5	Cutter Gauthier^{†}	Philadelphia Flyers
4	126	Charles Leddy^{†}	New Jersey Devils

† incoming freshman
