= 2021–22 UConn Huskies men's ice hockey season =

- Conference: T–4th Hockey East
- Home ice: XL Center

Rankings
- USCHO: #19
- USA Today: NR

Record
- Overall: 20–16–0
- Conference: 14–10–0
- Home: 7–7–0
- Road: 11–7–0
- Neutral: 2–2–0

Coaches and captains
- Head coach: Mike Cavanaugh
- Assistant coaches: Joe Pereira; Tyler Helton; Vince Stalletti; Joe Ferriss; Will Moran
- Captain(s): Jáchym Kondelík; Carter Turnbull
- Alternate captain(s): Marc Gatcomb; Roman Kinal

The 2021–22 UConn Huskies men's ice hockey season was the 62nd season of play for the program, the 24th at the Division I level, and the 8th season in the Hockey East conference. The Huskies represented the University of Connecticut and were coached by Mike Cavanaugh, in his 9th season.

This was expected to be UConn's final season playing home games at the XL Center in downtown Hartford, Connecticut. In May, 2021, UConn began construction on a new 2,600-seat arena on its Storrs campus that will be home to both the Huskies men's and women's hockey programs upon its opening, planned for the 2022–23 season.

== Season ==
UConn entered the season looking to post their first winning record since 2013. Though they had been trending upwards in recent years, the Huskies were still picked to finish in the middle of the standings. The biggest question early was which goaltender would take over for the departed Tomáš Vomáčka. Graduate Darion Hanson, who had transferred to UConn the year before, won the job and held the position for the duration of the season. Hanson proved to be a stabilizing force in goal, and kept Connecticut in contention for most of the season.

The biggest impediment to the Huskies was the poor non-conference record for their entire conference which downgraded the team's overall strength of schedule. While UConn won most of their games against unranked opponents, a middling record against ranked teams did the Huskies no favors and the team was a long shot to make the tournament at the end of January. A 4-game winning streak in February briefly put the team in the top-20, but the Huskies followed that by losing four out of five games near the end of the regular season.

Though UConn was guaranteed to finish with a winning record at the beginning of the playoff, they also knew that they had no chance to make the NCAA tournament without a conference championship. Hanson played masterfully in the quarterfinal game, stopping 38 shots from Boston University. In the semifinal the offense took over and triumphed over top-seeded Northeastern. Suddenly, the Huskies found themselves just 1 win away from the program's first NCAA tournament appearance. All they had to do now was defeat the defending national champions, Massachusetts. Hanson was again a brick wall in goal, turning aside all but one shot in regulation. The rest of the team, however, was outplayed by the Minutemen and could only hold on to force overtime. UMass ended the game on their first shot of overtime and ended the Huskies' season.

Despite the sour end, UConn recorded 20 wins for the first time in 24 years. Combined with their strong performances against the top teams in their conference, this was objectively the best season in the history of the program.

== Departures ==
Player	Position	Nationality	Cause
Kale Howarth	Forward	Canada	Signed professional contract (Rockford IceHogs)
Adam Karashik	Defenseman	United States	Graduate transfer to Notre Dame
Yan Kuznetsov	Defenseman	Russia	Signed professional contract (Calgary Flames)
Eric Linell	Forward	United States	Transferred to Bentley
Brian Rigali	Forward	United States	Graduate transfer to American International
Zac Robbins	Forward	United States	Graduation (signed with Utah Grizzlies)
Bradley Stone	Goaltender	United Kingdom	Graduation (retired)
Tomáš Vomáčka	Goaltender	Czech Republic	Signed professional contract (Nashville Predators)

== Recruiting ==
Player	Position	Nationality	Age	Notes
Chase Bradley	Forward	United States	19	St. Louis, MO; selected 203rd overall in 2020
Jarrod Gourley	Defenseman	Canada	22	Calgary, AB; transfer from Arizona State
Aidan Metcalfe	Defenseman	United States	21	Palos Verdes, CA
Kevin O'Neil	Forward	United States	23	Latham, NY; graduate transfer from Yale
Sasha Teleguine	Forward	United States	19	North Attleborough, MA
Logan Terness	Goaltender	Canada	19	Burnaby, BC
Jake Veilleux	Defenseman/Forward	United States	21	South Windsor, CT

== Roster ==
As of August 12, 2021.

No.	Nat.	Player	Class	Pos	Height	Weight	DoB	Hometown	Previous team	NHL rights
1	(United States)	Ryan Keane	Junior	G	5' 9" (1.75 m)	160 lb (73 kg)	1998-03-15	Lewisville, Texas	Jamestown Rebels (NAHL)	—
4	(United States)	Roman Kinal (A)	Junior	D	6' 2" (1.88 m)	190 lb (86 kg)	1998-07-20	Waterford, Michigan	Dubuque Fighting Saints (USHL)	—
5	(United States)	Aidan Metcalfe	Freshman	D	6' 3" (1.91 m)	191 lb (87 kg)	2000-01-24	Palos Verdes, California	Shreveport Mudbugs (NAHL)	—
6	(United States)	Ryan Wheeler	Senior	D	6' 0" (1.83 m)	190 lb (86 kg)	1997-08-24	Lancaster, New York	New Jersey Titans (NAHL)	—
7	(Canada)	Jonny Evans	Senior	F	5' 9" (1.75 m)	170 lb (77 kg)	1997-05-01	North Delta, British Columbia	Powell River Kings (BCHL)	—
8	(Canada)	Carter Turnbull (C)	Senior	F	5' 8" (1.73 m)	180 lb (82 kg)	1998-09-08	Nanaimo, British Columbia	Powell River Kings (BCHL)	—
9	(Canada)	Cassidy Bowes	Sophomore	F	5' 10" (1.78 m)	185 lb (84 kg)	1999-02-17	Sturgeon County, Alberta	Whitecourt Wolverines (AJHL)	—
10	(Russia)	Vladislav Firstov	Junior	F	6' 1" (1.85 m)	185 lb (84 kg)	2001-06-19	Yaroslavl, Russia	Waterloo Black Hawks (USHL)	MIN, 42nd overall 2019
11	(Czech Republic)	Jáchym Kondelík (C)	Senior	F	6' 5" (1.96 m)	225 lb (102 kg)	1999-12-21	Budějovice, Czech Republic	Muskegon Lumberjacks (USHL)	NSH, 111th overall 2018
12	(United States)	Gavin Puskar	Sophomore	F	6' 2" (1.88 m)	180 lb (82 kg)	2001-06-21	Farmington, Connecticut	Hotchkiss School (USHS–CT)	—
13	(United States)	John Wojciechowski	Senior	F	6' 3" (1.91 m)	210 lb (95 kg)	1998-02-18	Mamaroneck, New York	Langley Rivermen (BCHL)	—
16	(United States)	Jake Flynn	Junior	D	6' 0" (1.83 m)	180 lb (82 kg)	2001-05-26	Bridgewater, Massachusetts	Thayer Academy (USHS–MA)	—
17	(United States)	Marc Gatcomb (A)	Senior	F	6' 2" (1.88 m)	195 lb (88 kg)	1999-07-22	Woburn, Massachusetts	The Gunnery (USHS–CT)	—
18	(United States)	John Spetz	Sophomore	D	5' 10" (1.78 m)	195 lb (88 kg)	1999-12-01	Oak Ridge, New Jersey	Chicago Steel (USHL)	—
19	(United States)	Kevin O'Neil	Graduate	F	5' 11" (1.8 m)	180 lb (82 kg)	1998-02-23	Latham, New York	Yale (ECAC)	—
20	(United States)	Chase Bradley	Freshman	F	5' 11" (1.8 m)	180 lb (82 kg)	2002-01-09	St. Louis, Missouri	Sioux City Musketeers (USHL)	DET, 203rd overall 2020
21	(United States)	Nick Capone	Sophomore	F	6' 2" (1.88 m)	205 lb (93 kg)	2001-12-17	East Haven, Connecticut	Tri-City Storm (USHL)	TBL, 157th overall 2020
22	(Canada)	Hudson Schandor	Sophomore	F	5' 8" (1.73 m)	165 lb (75 kg)	2000-09-29	North Vancouver, British Columbia	Surrey Eagles (BCHL)	—
23	(Canada)	Carter Berger	Junior	D	6' 0" (1.83 m)	195 lb (88 kg)	1999-09-17	North Vancouver, British Columbia	Victoria Grizzlies (BCHL)	FLA, 106th overall 2019
24	(United States)	Sasha Teleguine	Freshman	F	5' 10" (1.78 m)	180 lb (82 kg)	2002-09-17	North Attleborough, Massachusetts	Chilliwack Chiefs (BCHL)	—
27	(Canada)	Harrison Rees	Junior	D	6' 2" (1.88 m)	175 lb (79 kg)	2000-03-19	Mississauga, Ontario	North York Rangers (OJHL)	—
28	(Canada)	Ryan Tverberg	Sophomore	F	5' 11" (1.8 m)	180 lb (82 kg)	2002-01-30	Richmond Hill, Ontario	Toronto Jr. Canadiens (OJHL)	TOR, 213th overall 2020
29	(United States)	Jake Veilleux	Freshman	D	6' 0" (1.83 m)	185 lb (84 kg)	2000-01-19	South Windsor, Connecticut	Victoria Grizzlies (BCHL)	—
31	(United States)	Matt Pasquale	Sophomore	G	6' 2" (1.88 m)	190 lb (86 kg)	2000-10-06	North Reading, Massachusetts	Northeast Generals (NAHL)	—
32	(Russia)	Artem Shlaine	Sophomore	F	6' 1" (1.85 m)	175 lb (79 kg)	2002-03-17	Moscow, Russia	Shattuck-Saint Mary's (USHS–MN)	NJD, 130th overall 2020
33	(United States)	Darion Hanson	Graduate	G	6' 3" (1.91 m)	180 lb (82 kg)	1997-05-19	East Bethel, Minnesota	Union (ECAC)	—
35	(Canada)	Logan Terness	Freshman	G	6' 1" (1.85 m)	185 lb (84 kg)	2002-09-18	Burnaby, British Columbia	Trail Smoke Eaters (BCHL)	—
60	(Canada)	Jarrod Gourley	Graduate	D	6' 2" (1.88 m)	212 lb (96 kg)	1999-06-29	Calgary, Alberta	Arizona State (NCAA)	—

== Standings ==
2021–22 Hockey East Standings
	Conference record										Overall record					
	GP	W	L	T	OTW	OTL	SOW	PTS	GF	GA	GP	W	L	T	GF	GA
#12 Northeastern †	24	15	8	1	1	1	1	47	68	46	39	25	13	1	99	68
#10 Massachusetts *	24	14	8	2	2	3	1	46	77	54	37	22	13	2	117	88
#13 Massachusetts Lowell	24	15	8	1	1	0	1	46	62	48	35	21	11	3	102	74
#19 Connecticut	24	14	10	0	2	1	0	41	73	61	36	20	16	0	109	89
Boston University	24	13	8	3	3	2	0	41	69	58	35	19	13	3	107	89
Merrimack	24	13	11	0	1	3	0	41	70	70	35	19	15	1	109	99
#20 Providence	24	12	11	1	1	1	1	38	61	52	38	22	14	2	118	82
Boston College	24	9	12	3	0	1	1	32	67	77	38	15	18	5	114	123
New Hampshire	24	8	15	1	2	2	0	25	47	71	34	14	19	1	76	95
Vermont	24	6	16	2	3	1	2	20	41	72	35	8	25	2	59	101
Maine	24	5	17	2	2	3	1	19	54	80	33	7	22	4	74	111
Championship: March 19, 2022 † indicates regular season champion * indicates conference tournament champion (Lamoriello Trophy); Rankings: USCHO.com Top 20 Poll

== Schedule and results ==
Date	Time	Opponent^{#}	Rank^{#}	Site	TV	Decision	Result	Attendance	Record
Regular season
October 2	4:05 PM	Sacred Heart*		XL Center • Hartford, Connecticut		Hanson	W 6–3	2,417	1–0–0
October 8	7:05 PM	#10 Boston University		XL Center • Hartford, Connecticut		Hanson	L 1–2	3,084	1–1–0 (0–1–0)
October 9	7:00 PM	at #10 Boston University		Agganis Arena • Boston, Massachusetts		Hanson	W 5–1	3,533	2–1–0 (1–1–0)
October 15	7:05 PM	at Ohio State*		Value City Arena • Columbus, Ohio		Hanson	L 3–4 ^{OT}	2,775	2–2–0
October 16	3:05 PM	at Ohio State*		Value City Arena • Columbus, Ohio		Hanson	L 0–3	2,446	2–3–0
October 26	7:00 PM	at #20 Northeastern		Matthews Arena • Boston, Massachusetts	NESN	Hanson	W 5–3	2,006	3–3–0 (2–1–0)
October 30	6:00 PM	at Dartmouth*		Thompson Arena • Hanover, New Hampshire		Hanson	W 4–1	1,027	4–3–0
November 5	7:30 PM	at Maine		Alfond Arena • Orono, Maine		Hanson	W 4–3	3,790	5–3–0 (3–1–0)
November 6	7:00 PM	at Maine		Alfond Arena • Orono, Maine		Hanson	W 3–2 ^{OT}	3,781	6–3–0 (4–1–0)
November 12	7:05 PM	#16 Boston College		XL Center • Hartford, Connecticut		Hanson	L 1–2	5,694	6–4–0 (4–2–0)
November 13	7:00 PM	at #12 Providence		Schneider Arena • Providence, Rhode Island		Hanson	L 4–6	2,572	6–5–0 (4–3–0)
November 20	6:05 PM	at #15 Massachusetts Lowell		Tsongas Center • Lowell, Massachusetts	NESN	Hanson	L 0–3	5,025	6–6–0 (4–4–0)
November 21	3:35 PM	at #15 Massachusetts Lowell		XL Center • Hartford, Connecticut		Hanson	W 2–1	3,066	7–6–0 (5–4–0)
November 27	7:00 PM	Colgate*		XL Center • Hartford, Connecticut		Hanson	W 6–1	3,134	8–6–0
January 2	7:00 PM	at #19 Harvard*		Bright-Landry Hockey Center • Boston, Massachusetts		Hanson	L 6–3	250	8–7–0
January 8	4:00 PM	at #18 Boston College		Conte Forum • Chestnut Hill, Massachusetts	NESN+	Hanson	W 5–4	3,524	9–7–0 (6–4–0)
January 11	7:05 PM	at American International*		MassMutual Center • Springfield, Massachusetts		Terness	L 1–3	207	9–8–0
January 14	7:05 PM	Boston University		XL Center • Hartford, Connecticut		Hanson	L 1–2 ^{OT}	3,596	9–9–0 (6–5–0)
January 21	7:05 PM	New Hampshire		XL Center • Hartford, Connecticut		Hanson	L 1–3	2,928	9–10–0 (6–6–0)
January 22	4:05 PM	New Hampshire		XL Center • Hartford, Connecticut	NESN+	Hanson	W 3–2 ^{OT}	3,855	10–10–0 (7–6–0)
January 25	7:05 PM	#19 Merrimack		XL Center • Hartford, Connecticut		Hanson	W 3–2	2,429	11–10–0 (8–6–0)
Connecticut Ice
January 29	3:30 PM	vs. Yale*		Webster Bank Arena • Bridgeport, Connecticut (Connecticut Ice semifinal)	SNY	Hanson	W 5–1	0	12–10–0
January 30	4:30 PM	vs. #2 Quinnipiac*		Webster Bank Arena • Bridgeport, Connecticut (Connecticut Ice championship)	SNY	Hanson	L 0–2	0	12–11–0
February 4	7:05 PM	#17 Providence		XL Center • Hartford, Connecticut	NESN+	Hanson	W 2–1	3,647	13–11–0 (9–6–0)
February 5	7:30 PM	at New Hampshire		Whittemore Center • Durham, New Hampshire		Hanson	W 6–1	5,574	14–11–0 (10–6–0)
February 8	7:00 PM	at Merrimack		J. Thom Lawler Rink • North Andover, Massachusetts		Hanson	W 6–2	1,953	15–11–0 (11–6–0)
February 11	7:05 PM	at Boston College		Conte Forum • Chestnut Hill, Massachusetts	NESN+	Hanson	W 6–4	3,024	16–11–0 (12–6–0)
February 18	7:05 PM	#10 Massachusetts	#20	XL Center • Hartford, Connecticut		Hanson	L 1–2	4,358	16–12–0 (12–7–0)
February 19	7:00 PM	at #10 Massachusetts	#20	Mullins Center • Amherst, Massachusetts	NESN+	Hanson	W 4–2	5,036	17–12–0 (13–7–0)
February 25	7:05 PM	#15 Northeastern	#19т	XL Center • Hartford, Connecticut	NESN+	Hanson	L 1–3	1,422	17–13–0 (13–8–0)
February 26	3:05 PM	at #15 Northeastern	#19т	Matthews Arena • Boston, Massachusetts		Hanson	L 2–5	3,942	17–14–0 (13–9–0)
March 4	7:05 PM	Vermont		XL Center • Hartford, Connecticut		Hanson	L 3–5	3,157	17–15–0 (13–10–0)
March 5	3:05 PM	Vermont		XL Center • Hartford, Connecticut		Hanson	W 4–0	3,182	18–15–0 (14–10–0)
Hockey East Tournament
March 12	7:00 PM	#16 Boston University*		XL Center • Hartford, Connecticut (Quarterfinal)		Hanson	W 3–1	3,416	19–15–0
March 18	4:00 PM	vs. #10 Northeastern*	#19	TD Garden • Boston, Massachusetts (Semifinal)	NESN	Hanson	W 4–1	13,106	20–15–0
March 19	7:00 PM	vs. #11 Massachusetts*	#19	TD Garden • Boston, Massachusetts (Championship)	NESN	Hanson	L 1–2 ^{OT}	12,049	20–16–0
*Non-conference game. ^{#}Rankings from USCHO.com Poll. All times are in Eastern Time. Source:

== Scoring statistics ==
Name	Position	Games	Goals	Assists	Points	PIM
Jáchym Kondelík	C	36	12	21	33	16
Ryan Tverberg	C/RW	36	14	18	32	16
Vladislav Firstov	LW	35	12	11	23	18
Marc Gatcomb	F	36	8	13	21	14
Hudson Schandor	C	28	5	13	18	12
John Spetz	D	36	4	14	18	14
Artem Shlaine	C	36	7	10	17	6
Kevin O'Neil	RW	36	6	10	16	16
Carter Turnbull	RW	36	11	4	15	22
Jonny Evans	F	34	6	9	15	14
Harrison Rees	D	36	3	10	13	10
Nick Capone	RW	31	4	7	11	28
Jake Flynn	D	31	2	8	10	12
Chase Bradley	C/LW	29	4	5	9	14
Carter Berger	D	35	1	7	8	16
Jarrod Gourley	D	35	3	4	7	14
Roman Kinal	D	36	3	4	7	24
Ryan Wheeler	D	36	2	4	6	6
Jake Veilleux	D/F	16	1	2	3	0
Sasha Teleguine	F	20	1	2	3	4
Darion Hanson	G	35	0	2	2	0
John Wojciechowski	C	14	0	1	1	0
Aidan Metcalfe	D	1	0	0	0	0
Logan Terness	G	1	0	0	0	0
Cassidy Bowes	LW	11	0	0	0	2
Bench	-	-	-	-	-	6
Total			109	179	288	284

== Goaltending statistics ==
Name	Games	Minutes	Wins	Losses	Ties	Goals against	Saves	Shut outs	SV %	GAA
Darion Hanson	35	2092	20	15	0	78	932	1	.923	2.24
Logan Terness	1	58	0	1	0	3	28	0	.903	3.08
Empty Net	-	24	-	-	-	8	-	-	-	-
Total	36	2174	20	16	0	97	960	1	.915	2.46

== Rankings ==
Poll	Week																									
Poll	Pre	1	2	3	4	5	6	7	8	9	10	11	12	13	14	15	16	17	18	19	20	21	22	23	24	25 (Final)
USCHO.com	NR	NR	NR	NR	NR	NR	NR	NR	NR	NR	NR	NR	NR	NR	NR	NR	NR	NR	20	19	NR	NR	19	19	-	19
USA Today	NR	NR	NR	NR	NR	NR	NR	NR	NR	NR	NR	NR	NR	NR	NR	NR	NR	NR	NR	NR	NR	NR	NR	NR	NR	NR

Note: USCHO did not release a poll in week 24.

== Awards and honors ==
Player	Award	Ref
Ryan Tverberg	AHCA East Second Team All-American	
Jáchym Kondelík	Hockey East Best Defensive Forward	
Ryan Tverberg	Hockey East First Team	
Jáchym Kondelík	Hockey East Second Team	
John Spetz	Hockey East All-Tournament Team	
Vladislav Firstov	Hockey East All-Tournament Team	

== Players drafted into the NHL ==
=== 2022 NHL entry draft ===
Round	Pick	Player	NHL team
6	170	Jake Richard^{†}	Buffalo Sabres
6	172	Joey Muldowney^{†}	San Jose Sharks

† incoming freshman
