= 2021–22 Northeastern Huskies men's ice hockey season =

Hockey East, regular season champions NCAA Tournament, Northeast Regional semifinal
- Conference: 1st Hockey East
- Home ice: Matthews Arena

Rankings
- USCHO: #13
- USA Today: #12

Record
- Overall: 25–13–1
- Conference: 15–9–1
- Home: 14–4–1
- Road: 9–5–0
- Neutral: 2–4–0

Coaches and captains
- Head coach: Jerry Keefe
- Assistant coaches: Mike Levine; Mike McLaughlin; Mike Condon
- Captain: Jordan Harris
- Alternate captain(s): Riley Hughes; Julian Kislin; Aidan McDonough

The 2021–22 Northeastern Huskies Men's ice hockey season was the 90th season of play for the program. They represented Northeastern University in the 2021–22 NCAA Division I men's ice hockey season and for the 38th season in the Hockey East conference. The Huskies were coached by Jerry Keefe, in his first season, and played their home games at Matthews Arena.

== Season ==
In the offseason, Northeaster reshuffled its athletic department with former hockey head coach Jim Madigan being promoted to Athletic Director and former assistant Jerry Keefe taking his place at the helm of the program. The biggest addition to the team, however, was new starting goaltender Devon Levi. Levi had sat out the previous season on account of COVID-19 but remained enrolled throughout his freshman year. He kicked off his college career with a pair of shutouts and quickly acclimated to the pace of play and volume of shots.

After a bit of a fitful start, Levi settled down and produced a tremendous stretch of goaltending. Over the course of fourteen games beginning in late-October and continuing until early-January, Levi didn't allow more than two goals in any match. Northeastern went 12–1–1 in that time with Levi racking up 5 shutouts and posting a mind-boggling .969 save percentage. The Huskies defense wasn't particularly porous, allowing fewer than 28 shots against in those games, but Levi's astounding performance had him chasing history for the all-time record.

Unfortunately, Northeastern wasn't playing nearly as well on the other end of the ice. The Huskies were relatively weak in the goal-scoring department with the exception of Aidan Mcdonough. The team ended up relying on the junior winger for more than a quarter of its goals and was hard pressed to put together much in the way of offense when he was off the ice.

In February 2021, both the men's and women's programs were selected to participate in the 2021 Winter Universiade. Concerns about COVID-19 caused postponements to be announced in August but new dates were set by November. By the end of the month, however, fears over the Omicron variant forced the Swiss government to introduce new travel restrictions which forced the cancellation of the games.

Despite the scoring woes, Northeastern was in a prime position to make the NCAA tournament when the second half of the season began. However, after a couple of easy tilts against Long Island, Levi's performance began to break down. In a 4-game stretch, he allowed 15 goals and put the team precarious close to dropping below the cutoff line for the NCAA tournament. To make matters worse for the Huskies, Levi departed afterwards to join Team Canada at the 2022 Winter Olympics. His replacement, T. J. Semptimphelter, was a true freshman that had yet to play a single minute of college hockey and he was thrown in against #14 Massachusetts Lowell. Semptimphelter responded with an admirable, although losing, performance and then produced several solid games over the next four weeks.

Upon Levi's return in late-February, Northeastern had improved its position during his absence. Although the team lost in the Beanpot final, the Huskies were ranked in the top-15 and had an outside chance at a conference title. Levi announced his return with a 60-save victory over Connecticut and followed that up with a 40-save performance the following night. After a stunning loss to lowly Vermont, the team needed quite a bit of help as it was 5 points behind Massachusetts for 1st-place. In a stunning turn of events, the Minutemen lost both games on the final weekend of the regular season in regulation while Northeastern shut down Merrimack to vault to top of the standings and capture the program's first ever league title.

=== Postseason ===
When the Huskies began postseason play they did so knowing that the only guarantee of making the NCAA tournament was a conference championship. With anything less, they would have to hope that other conferences would not be won by underdog teams. Boston College was the first opponent for Northeastern and everything seemed to be going their way in the first two periods. NU entered the final frame with a 3–0 lead and was ready to cruise to an easy victory but the Eagles had other ideas. BC's offense went on the attack and fired 25 shots on goal in the last 20 minutes, getting two goals in just over 16 minutes, but the defense was able to hold over the last 3:48 and prevent Boston College from forcing overtime. The narrow victory was a portent of things to come, however, and the team was again widely outshot in the semifinal. Connecticut's defense was ready for the Huskies and limited Northeastern to a single goal, knocking NU out with a 1–4 loss. The defeat put Northeastern on the brink of disaster since the team was dropped down to #14 in the Pairwise rankings. That meant that the Huskies would miss out on the tournament if more than one lower-seeded teams won their conference championship games. After Harvard won the ECAC Hockey crown, the Huskies were put on the chopping block. Both the Hockey East and CCHA title games went into overtime but, fortunately for Northeastern, both were won by higher-seeded teams and the Huskies ended up receiving the last at-large bid into the tournament.

Northeastern was set opposite Western Michigan, one of the top offenses in the nation. With their work cut out for them, the 4th-seeded Huskies came out skating hard and tried to outplay the Broncos. Both teams raced up and down the ice for most of the game and though WMU got an early lead, Levi made sure they weren't able to build on it. Northeastern seemed to grow stronger as the match wore on and fired more and more pucks on goal. With less than 4 minutes remaining in the game, Mcdonough finally broke through with his 25th goal of the year, tying the score. Less than 90 seconds into overtime, Levi made a poor clearing attempt from behind his net. The puck was knocked down by a Bronco who then skated around the cage and tried to score on an empty net. Levi raced to get back into position and initially it appeared that he was just able to stop the goal. However, replay showed that the puck had completely crossed the goal line prior to his diving attempt and the game went to Western Michigan.

Levi ended up finishing the season just .004 below the all-time record for save percentage in a single season. However, because he played in at least 30 games during the season, Levi broke the record for career save percentage with .952. Retaining the record will depend on his performance in future seasons.

== Departures ==
Player	Position	Nationality	Cause
Billy Carrabino	Defenseman	United States	Graduation (retired)
Curtis Frye	Goaltender	United States	Graduation (retired)
Austin Goldstein	Forward	United States	Graduation (retired)
Grant Jozefek	Forward	United States	Graduation (Signed with Worcester Railers)
Michael Kesselring	Defenseman	United States	Signed professional contract (Edmonton Oilers)
Collin Murphy	Defenseman	United States	Graduation (retired)
Connor Murphy	Goaltender	United States	Transferred to Union
Nick Scarpa	Goaltender	United States	Graduation (retired)
Neil Shea	Forward	United States	Transferred to Sacred Heart
Zach Solow	Forward	United States	Graduation (Signed with Chicago Wolves)
T. J. Walsh	Forward	United States	Transferred to Rensselaer

== Recruiting ==
Player	Position	Nationality	Age	Notes
Matt Choupani	Forward	Canada	19	Montreal, QC
Evan Fear	Goaltender	United States	22	Winnetka, IL; transfer from Quinnipiac
Cam Gaudette	Defenseman	United States	21	Braintree, MA
Justin Hryckowian	Forward	Canada	20	L'Île-Bizard, QC
Jack Hughes	Forward	United States	17	Westwood, MA
Chase McInnis	Forward	United States	20	Hingham, MA
Tommy Miller	Defenseman	United States	22	West Bloomfield, MI; graduate transfer from Michigan State
Jakov Novak	Forward	Canada	22	Riverside, ON; transfer from Bentley; selected 188th overall in 2018
T. J. Semptimphelter	Goaltender	United States	19	Marlton, NJ
Ryan St. Louis	Forward	United States	18	Burlington, VT

== Roster ==
As of August 12, 2021.

No.	Nat.	Player	Class	Pos	Height	Weight	DoB	Hometown	Previous team	NHL rights
1	(Canada)	Devon Levi	Sophomore	G	6' 0" (1.83 m)	185 lb (84 kg)	2001-12-27	Dollard-des-Ormeaux, Quebec	Carleton Place Canadians (CCHL)	BUF, 212th overall 2020
2	(United States)	Jordan Harris (C)	Senior	D	5' 11" (1.8 m)	185 lb (84 kg)	2000-07-07	Haverhill, Massachusetts	Kimball Union Academy (USHS–NH)	MTL, 71st overall 2018
3	(United States)	Jayden Struble	Junior	D	6' 0" (1.83 m)	205 lb (93 kg)	2001-09-08	Cumberland, Rhode Island	Saint Sebastian's School (USHS–MA)	MTL, 46th overall 2019
4	(Canada)	Jérémie Bucheler	Junior	D	6' 4" (1.93 m)	200 lb (91 kg)	2000-03-31	Saint-Laurent, Quebec	Victoria Grizzlies (BCHL)	—
5	(Canada)	Matt Choupani	Freshman	F	5' 11" (1.8 m)	185 lb (84 kg)	2002-01-02	Baie-D'Urfé, Quebec	Des Moines Buccaneers (USHL)	—
6	(United States)	Chase McInnis	Freshman	F	5' 11" (1.8 m)	180 lb (82 kg)	2001-02-23	Hingham, Massachusetts	Victoria Grizzlies (BCHL)	—
7	(United States)	Michael Outzen	Sophomore	F	6' 0" (1.83 m)	185 lb (84 kg)	1999-07-29	Lone Tree, Colorado	New Jersey Titans (NAHL)	—
8	(United States)	Julian Kislin (A)	Senior	D	6' 0" (1.83 m)	190 lb (86 kg)	1999-05-24	Manalapan, New Jersey	Youngstown Phantoms (USHL)	—
9	(United States)	Johnny DeRoche	Senior	D	5' 10" (1.78 m)	185 lb (84 kg)	1998-06-23	Lynnfield, Massachusetts	Vermont (HEA)	—
10	(Canada)	Jakov Novak	Senior	F	6' 3" (1.91 m)	210 lb (95 kg)	1998-10-22	Windsor, Ontario	Bentley (AHA)	OTT, 188th overall 2018
11	(United States)	Gunnarwolfe Fontaine	Sophomore	F	5' 10" (1.78 m)	175 lb (79 kg)	2000-09-16	East Greenwich, Rhode Island	Chicago Steel (USHL)	NSH, 202nd overall 2020
12	(United States)	Tommy Miller	Graduate	D	6' 2" (1.88 m)	195 lb (88 kg)	1999-03-06	West Bloomfield, Michigan	Michigan State (Big Ten)	—
13	(United States)	Ryan St. Louis	Freshman	F	5' 10" (1.78 m)	170 lb (77 kg)	2003-06-13	Tampa, Florida	USNTDP (USHL)	—
14	(Canada)	Ty Jackson	Sophomore	F	5' 8" (1.73 m)	160 lb (73 kg)	2001-09-06	Oakville, Ontario	Dubuque Fighting Saints (USHL)	—
15	(Canada)	Dylan Jackson	Sophomore	D	5' 10" (1.78 m)	185 lb (84 kg)	2001-09-06	Oakville, Ontario	Dubuque Fighting Saints (USHL)	—
16	(United States)	Sam Colangelo	Sophomore	F	6' 2" (1.88 m)	208 lb (94 kg)	2001-12-26	Stoneham, Massachusetts	Chicago Steel (USHL)	ANA, 36th overall 2020
17	(Canada)	Marco Bozzo	Senior	F	5' 11" (1.8 m)	185 lb (84 kg)	1996-11-22	Woodbridge, Ontario	Massachusetts (HEA)	—
18	(Canada)	Tyler Spott	Junior	D	5' 11" (1.8 m)	170 lb (77 kg)	2000-06-17	Toronto, Ontario	Green Bay Gamblers (USHL)	—
19	(United States)	Riley Hughes (A)	Junior	F	6' 2" (1.88 m)	175 lb (79 kg)	2000-06-27	Westwood, Massachusetts	Victoria Grizzlies (BCHL)	NYR, 216th overall 2018
20	(United States)	Alex Mella	Junior	F	6' 0" (1.83 m)	195 lb (88 kg)	1999-02-21	Stamford, Connecticut	Madison Capitols (USHL)	—
21	(United States)	Matt DeMelis	Junior	F	6' 0" (1.83 m)	185 lb (84 kg)	1999-06-02	Hingham, Massachusetts	Youngstown Phantoms (USHL)	—
23	(United States)	Cam Gaudette	Freshman	D	6' 1" (1.85 m)	190 lb (86 kg)	2000-06-01	Braintree, Massachusetts	Maryland Black Bears (NAHL)	—
24	(United States)	Steven Agriogianis	Sophomore	F	5' 9" (1.75 m)	170 lb (77 kg)	1999-01-07	East Hanover, New Jersey	Nanaimo Clippers (BCHL)	—
25	(United States)	Aidan McDonough (A)	Junior	F	6' 2" (1.88 m)	200 lb (91 kg)	1999-11-06	Milton, Massachusetts	Cedar Rapids RoughRiders (USHL)	VAN, 195th overall 2019
26	(United States)	James Davenport	Sophomore	D	5' 11" (1.8 m)	185 lb (84 kg)	2000-05-01	Natick, Massachusetts	Victoria Grizzlies (BCHL)	—
27	(United States)	Jack Hughes	Freshman	F	6' 0" (1.83 m)	165 lb (75 kg)	2003-11-02	Westwood, Massachusetts	USNTDP (USHL)	—
29	(Canada)	Justin Hryckowian	Freshman	F	5' 10" (1.78 m)	195 lb (88 kg)	2001-02-23	L'Île-Bizard, Quebec	Sioux City Musketeers (USHL)	—
33	(United States)	T. J. Semptimphelter	Freshman	G	6' 1" (1.85 m)	190 lb (86 kg)	2002-05-09	Marlton, New Jersey	Boston Junior Bruins (NCDC)	—
35	(United States)	Evan Fear	Junior	G	6' 2" (1.88 m)	195 lb (88 kg)	1999-07-05	Winnetka, Illinois	Quinnipiac (ECAC)	—

== Standings ==
2021–22 Hockey East Standings
	Conference record										Overall record					
	GP	W	L	T	OTW	OTL	SOW	PTS	GF	GA	GP	W	L	T	GF	GA
#12 Northeastern †	24	15	8	1	1	1	1	47	68	46	39	25	13	1	99	68
#10 Massachusetts *	24	14	8	2	2	3	1	46	77	54	37	22	13	2	117	88
#13 Massachusetts Lowell	24	15	8	1	1	0	1	46	62	48	35	21	11	3	102	74
#19 Connecticut	24	14	10	0	2	1	0	41	73	61	36	20	16	0	109	89
Boston University	24	13	8	3	3	2	0	41	69	58	35	19	13	3	107	89
Merrimack	24	13	11	0	1	3	0	41	70	70	35	19	15	1	109	99
#20 Providence	24	12	11	1	1	1	1	38	61	52	38	22	14	2	118	82
Boston College	24	9	12	3	0	1	1	32	67	77	38	15	18	5	114	123
New Hampshire	24	8	15	1	2	2	0	25	47	71	34	14	19	1	76	95
Vermont	24	6	16	2	3	1	2	20	41	72	35	8	25	2	59	101
Maine	24	5	17	2	2	3	1	19	54	80	33	7	22	4	74	111
Championship: March 19, 2022 † indicates regular season champion * indicates conference tournament champion (Lamoriello Trophy); Rankings: USCHO.com Top 20 Poll

== Schedule and results ==
Date	Time	Opponent^{#}	Rank^{#}	Site	TV	Decision	Result	Attendance	Record
Regular season
October 2	7:00 PM	Bentley*		Matthews Arena • Boston, Massachusetts		Levi	W 4–0	4,208	1–0–0
Ice Breaker Tournament
October 8	7:30 PM	vs. Holy Cross*	#18	DCU Center • Worcester, Massachusetts (Ice Breaker Game 1)		Levi	W 3–0	1,627	2–0–0
October 9	4:30 PM	vs. #9 Quinnipiac*	#18	DCU Center • Worcester, Massachusetts (Ice Breaker Game 2)		Levi	L 0–3	872	2–1–0
Regular season
October 15	7:00 PM	at #6 Boston College	#18	Conte Forum • Chestnut Hill, Massachusetts	NESN+	Levi	L 3–5	7,288	2–2–0 (0–1–0)
October 23	7:00 PM	Colorado College*	#20	Matthews Arena • Boston, Massachusetts	NESN+	Levi	W 1–0	4,650	3–2–0
October 26	7:00 PM	Connecticut	#20	Matthews Arena • Boston, Massachusetts	NESN	Levi	L 3–5	2,006	3–3–0 (0–2–0)
October 29	7:00 PM	Maine	#20	Matthews Arena • Boston, Massachusetts	NESN	Levi	W 5–0	2,138	4–3–0 (1–2–0)
October 30	7:00 PM	Maine	#20	Matthews Arena • Boston, Massachusetts		Levi	W 3–2	2,179	5–3–0 (2–2–0)
November 5	7:00 PM	at New Hampshire		Whittemore Center • Durham, New Hampshire	NESN+	Levi	W 4–1	4,063	6–3–0 (3–2–0)
November 6	7:00 PM	New Hampshire		Matthews Arena • Boston, Massachusetts		Levi	W 4–1	2,352	7–3–0 (4–2–0)
November 9	7:00 PM	#10 Harvard*	#17	Matthews Arena • Boston, Massachusetts		Levi	W 2–1 ^{OT}	4,018	8–3–0
November 12	7:15 PM	at #20 Massachusetts Lowell	#17	Tsongas Center • Lowell, Massachusetts	NESN+	Levi	L 1–2 ^{OT}	4,986	8–4–0 (4–3–0)
November 19	7:30 PM	at Boston University	#18	Agganis Arena • Boston, Massachusetts		Levi	W 1–0 ^{OT}	4,482	9–4–0 (5–3–0)
November 20	7:00 PM	Boston University	#18	Matthews Arena • Boston, Massachusetts	NESN+	Levi	T 2–2 ^{SOW}	4,703	9–4–1 (5–3–1)
November 26	7:00 PM	at Rensselaer*	#16	Houston Field House • Troy, New York		Levi	W 2–1	32	10–4–1
November 28	3:00 PM	Rensselaer*	#16	Matthews Arena • Boston, Massachusetts	NESN	Levi	W 2–1	1,387	11–4–1
December 3	7:00 PM	at #13 Providence	#16	Schneider Arena • Providence, Rhode Island		Levi	W 2–0	2,762	12–4–1 (6–3–1)
December 4	7:00 PM	#13 Providence	#16	Matthews Arena • Boston, Massachusetts	NESN+	Levi	W 4–1	2,638	13–4–1 (7–3–1)
January 7	7:00 PM	Long Island*	#11	Matthews Arena • Boston, Massachusetts	NESN	Levi	W 1–0	0	14–4–1
January 8	7:00 PM	Long Island*	#11	Matthews Arena • Boston, Massachusetts		Levi	W 6–0	0	15–4–1
January 11	7:00 PM	Arizona State*	#11	Matthews Arena • Boston, Massachusetts		Levi	L 2–6	0	15–5–1
January 18	5:30 PM	at Vermont	#12	Gutterson Fieldhouse • Burlington, Vermont		Levi	W 4–0	2,307	16–5–1 (8–3–1)
January 21	7:00 PM	at #14 Massachusetts	#12	Mullins Center • Amherst, Massachusetts	NESN	Levi	L 2–3	3,542	16–6–1 (8–4–1)
January 22	7:30 PM	#14 Massachusetts	#12	Matthews Arena • Boston, Massachusetts	NESN+	Levi	L 0–6	0	16–7–1 (8–5–1)
January 28	7:30 PM	#14 Massachusetts Lowell	#15	Matthews Arena • Boston, Massachusetts		Semptimphelter	L 1–2	2,722	16–8–1 (8–6–1)
February 4	7:00 PM	Vermont	#16	Matthews Arena • Boston, Massachusetts	NESN	Semptimphelter	W 5–4	1,339	17–8–1 (9–6–1)
Beanpot
February 7	8:00 PM	vs. Boston College*	#15	TD Garden • Boston, Massachusetts (Beanpot Semifinal)	NESN	Semptimphelter	W 3–1	15,535	18–8–1
February 11	7:15 PM	at #13 Massachusetts Lowell	#15	Tsongas Center • Lowell, Massachusetts		Semptimphelter	W 4–2	4,344	19–8–1 (10–6–1)
February 14	7:00 PM	vs. #17 Boston University*	#13	TD Garden • Boston, Massachusetts (Beanpot Championship)	NESN	Semptimphelter	L 0–1	17,850	19–9–1 (10–7–1)
February 18	7:00 PM	Boston College	#13	Matthews Arena • Boston, Massachusetts	NESN+	Semptimphelter	L 1–4	1,955	19–10–1 (10–8–1)
February 19	7:00 PM	at Boston College	#13	Conte Forum • Chestnut Hill, Massachusetts		Semptimphelter	W 4–1	5,163	20–10–1 (11–8–1)
February 25	7:05 PM	at #19т Connecticut	#15	XL Center • Hartford, Connecticut	NESN+	Levi	W 3–1	1,422	21–10–1 (12–8–1)
February 26	7:00 PM	#19т Connecticut	#15	Matthews Arena • Boston, Massachusetts		Levi	W 5–2	3,942	22–10–1 (13–8–1)
March 1	5:30 PM	at Vermont	#13	Gutterson Fieldhouse • Burlington, Vermont		Levi	L 0–1	2,295	22–11–1 (13–9–1)
March 4	7:00 PM	Merrimack	#13	Matthews Arena • Boston, Massachusetts		Levi	W 6–1	1,779	23–11–1 (14–9–1)
March 5	7:00 PM	at Merrimack	#13	J. Thom Lawler Rink • North Andover, Massachusetts		Levi	W 1–0	2,549	24–11–1 (15–9–1)
Hockey East Tournament
March 12	7:00 PM	Boston College*	#11	Matthews Arena • Boston, Massachusetts (Quarterfinal)		Levi	W 3–2	2,304	25–11–1
March 18	7:30 PM	vs. #19 Connecticut*	#10	TD Garden • Boston, Massachusetts (Semifinal)	NESN	Levi	L 1–4	13,106	25–12–1
NCAA Tournament
March 25	12:00 PM	vs. #4 Western Michigan*	#12	DCU Center • Worcester, Massachusetts (Northeast Regional semifinal)	ESPNU	Levi	L 1–2 ^{OT}	6,002	25–13–1
*Non-conference game. ^{#}Rankings from USCHO.com Poll. All times are in Eastern Time. Source:

== Scoring statistics ==
Name	Position	Games	Goals	Assists	Points	PIM
Aiden McDonough	LW	38	25	14	39	44
Sam Colangelo	C/RW	29	12	15	27	18
Gunnarwolfe Fontaine	C/LW	39	8	17	25	20
Justin Hryckowian	C	27	7	15	22	14
Ty Jackson	C	28	6	14	20	10
Jordan Harris	D	39	5	15	20	14
Jakov Novak	C/LW	39	8	9	17	28
Jack Hughes	C	39	7	9	16	28
Jayden Struble	D	34	3	11	14	65
Matt Demelis	F	39	4	8	12	2
Riley Hughes	RW	31	2	10	12	16
Jérémie Bucheler	D	35	1	10	11	14
Matt Choupani	C	39	6	4	10	8
Tommy Miller	D	39	1	8	9	12
Julian Kislin	D	34	2	4	6	14
Dylan Jackson	RW	8	0	3	3	0
Ryan St. Louis	LW	38	1	1	2	6
Alex Mella	LW	28	0	2	2	0
Devon Levi	G	32	0	2	2	0
Tyler Spott	D	37	0	2	2	12
Michael Outzen	F	24	1	0	1	4
John Deroche	D/F	8	0	1	1	0
Marco Bozzo	C	19	0	1	1	2
Evan Fear	G	1	0	0	0	0
James Davenport	D	6	0	0	0	2
Cam Gaudette	D	8	0	0	0	0
T. J. Semptimphelter	G	8	0	0	0	0
Chase McInnis	F	14	0	0	0	0
Steven Agriogianis	RW	20	0	0	0	2
Total			99	175	274	335

== Goaltending statistics ==
Name	Games	Minutes	Wins	Losses	Ties	Goals against	Saves	Shut outs	SV %	GAA
Devon Levi	32	1873	21	10	1	48	952	10	.952	1.54
T. J. Semptimphelter	8	438	4	3	0	15	211	0	.934	2.05
Evan Fear	1	26	0	0	0	2	9	0	.818	4.51
Empty Net	-	9	-	-	-	1	-	-	-	-
Total	39	2347	25	13	1	66	1172	10	.947	1.69

== Rankings ==
Poll	Week																									
Poll	Pre	1	2	3	4	5	6	7	8	9	10	11	12	13	14	15	16	17	18	19	20	21	22	23	24	25 (Final)
USCHO.com	NR	18	18	20	20	NR	17	18	18	16	13	13	11	11	12	15	16	15	13	15	13	11	10	12	-	13
USA Today	NR	NR	NR	NR	NR	NR	NR	NR	NR	NR	13	13	10	9	13	15	NR	NR	14	15	13	11	11	12	13	12

Note: USCHO did not release a poll in week 24.

== Awards and honors ==
Player	Award	Ref
Devon Levi	Tim Taylor Award	
Devon Levi	Mike Richter Award	
Devon Levi	AHCA East First Team All-American	
Aidan McDonough	AHCA East First Team All-American	
Jordan Harris	AHCA East Second Team All-American	
Jordan Harris	Hockey East Best Defensive Defenseman	
Devon Levi	Hockey East Rookie of the Year	
Devon Levi	Hockey East Goaltending Champion	
Devon Levi	Hockey East Three-Stars Award	
Jerry Keefe	Bob Kullen Coach of the Year Award	
Devon Levi	Hockey East First Team	
Jordan Harris	Hockey East First Team	
Aidan McDonough	Hockey East First Team	
Devon Levi	Hockey East Rookie Team	
Justin Hryckowian	Hockey East Rookie Team	
Jack Hughes	Hockey East Rookie Team	

== Players drafted into the NHL ==
=== 2022 NHL entry draft ===
Round	Pick	Player	NHL team
2	34	Cameron Lund^{†}	San Jose Sharks
2	51	Jack Hughes	Los Angeles Kings
4	128	Cameron Whitehead^{†}	Vegas Golden Knights
6	165	Hunter McDonald^{†}	Philadelphia Flyers
6	176	Jackson Dorrington^{†}	Vancouver Canucks
7	203	James Fisher^{†}	Columbus Blue Jackets

† incoming freshman
