= Jerry Keefe =

American ice hockey player and coach

Current position
- Title: Head coach
- Team: Northeastern
- Conference: Hockey East
- Record: 73–62–12 (.537)

Biographical details
- Born: February 27, 1976 (age 50); Billerica, Massachusetts, U.S.
- Education: Providence College

Playing career
- 1996–2000: Providence
- 1999–2000: Cincinnati Mighty Ducks
- 1999–2000: Trenton Titans
- 2000–2001: Belfast Giants
- 2001–2002: Cardiff Devils
- 2001–2002: Atlantic City Boardwalk Bullies
- 2003–2004: Orlando Seals
- 2003–2004: Charlotte Checkers
- Position: Center

Coaching career (HC unless noted)
- 2006–2007: Massachusetts–Boston (assistant)
- 2007–2009: Westfield State
- 2009–2011: Brown (assistant)
- 2011–2021: Northeastern (assistant)
- 2021–present: Northeastern

Head coaching record
- Overall: 84–71–16 (.538)
- Tournaments: 0–1 (.000)

Accomplishments and honors

Championships
- Hockey East Regular Season (2022); Beanpot (2023)

Jerry Keefe (born February 27, 1976) is the current head coach for Northeastern. Previously he served as an assistant for 10 years, taking over for Jim Madigan when his predecessor was promoted to Athletic Director.

== Career ==
Keefe began his college career with Providence in 1996. After two pedestrian seasons, Keefe's production exploded as a junior, more than doubling his career totals in one season. He was honored as the most improved player in New England and helped the Friars climb to 4th in the conference. Keefe wasn't able to keep up the pace in his senior season and he left the Friars mid-way through the year to pursue a professional career.

Keefe's abbreviated first season as a pro went fairly well. Though he didn't catch on in the AHL, he became a near point-per-game player for the Trenton Titans and helped the team reach the Turner Cup semifinals, finishing second in postseason scoring. Despite the success, Keefe headed to Europe and played for the Belfast Giants in the team's inaugural season. Keefe had a fairly bland year and joined the Cardiff Devils at the start of the 2002 season. He left after 9 games and returned across the Atlantic, finishing out the year with the Atlantic City Boardwalk Bullies.

After a year off, Keefe returned to the game with the Orlando Seals but injuries limited him to 33 games. He signed a contract to continue with the Seals the following year, however, due to a disagreement with the WHA, the entire league shut down after 2004 and Keefe decided to call it a career.

Keefe began his coaching career with Massachusetts–Boston but left after one year to take over at Westfield State. The Owls were a club team at the time but returned to varsity status in 2008. Keefe oversaw a swift rebuild and got the team to post a winning season as they joined Division III competition. Keefe jumped up to Division I in 2009, joining Brown as an assistant in 2009. Two years later he transitioned into a similar role with Northeastern when Jim Madigan took over. Keefe remained with the Huskies for a decade, helping build the program into a Hockey East power and getting the program to three NCAA Tournaments.

When Jeff Konya left his position as Athletic Director to take over the same role at San Jose State, Northeastern acted quickly and promoted Madigan to AD while advancing Keefe to head coach within a week.

== Statistics ==
=== Regular season and playoffs ===
			Regular season					Playoffs
Season	Team	League	GP	G	A	Pts	PIM	GP	G	A	Pts	PIM
1994–95	Omaha Lancers	USHL	47	25	36	61	75	—	—	—	—	—
1995–96	Omaha Lancers	USHL	38	18	40	58	40	—	—	—	—	—
1996–97	Providence	Hockey East	29	9	14	23	20	—	—	—	—	—
1997–98	Providence	Hockey East	23	5	9	14	10	—	—	—	—	—
1998–99	Providence	Hockey East	35	16	36	52	34	—	—	—	—	—
1999–00	Providence	Hockey East	17	0	9	9	6	—	—	—	—	—
1999–00	Cincinnati Mighty Ducks	AHL	7	0	1	1	2	—	—	—	—	—
1999–00	Trenton Titans	ECHL	26	7	15	22	14	10	7	5	12	4
2000–01	Belfast Giants	BISL	39	3	11	14	26	6	0	0	0	4
2001–02	Cardiff Devils	BNL	9	5	15	15	2	—	—	—	—	—
2001–02	Atlantic City Boardwalk Bullies	ECHL	30	11	14	25	12	10	2	3	5	2
2003–04	Charlotte Checkers	ECHL	2	0	0	0	0	—	—	—	—	—
2003–04	Orlando Seals	WHA2	33	11	22	33	48	—	—	—	—	—
USHL totals			85	43	76	119	115	—	—	—	—	—
NCAA totals			104	30	68	98	70	—	—	—	—	—
ECHL totals			58	18	29	47	26	20	9	8	17	6

== Head coaching record ==
Record table
Season	Team	Overall	Conference	Standing	Postseason
Westfield State Owls (ECAC Northeast) (2008–2009)
2008–09	Westfield State	11–9–4	7–7–3	T–8th	ECAC Northeast Quarterfinals
Westfield State:		11–9–4 (.542)	7–7–3 (.500)		
Northeastern Huskies (Hockey East) (2021–present)
2021–22	Northeastern	25–13–1	15–8–1	1st	NCAA Northeast Regional Semifinal
2022–23	Northeastern	17–13–5	14–7–3	3rd	Hockey East Quarterfinals
2023–24	Northeastern	17–16–3	9–14–1	7th	Hockey East Quarterfinals
2024–25	Northeastern	14–20–3	7–14–3	9th	Hockey East Semifinals
2025–26	Northeastern	12–12–1	7–9–0	6th	TBD
Northeastern:		85–74–13	52–52–8		
Total:		96–83–17			
National champion Postseason invitational champion Conference regular season champion Conference regular season and conference tournament champion Division regular season champion Division regular season and conference tournament champion Conference tournament champion
