= Ryan Tverberg =

Canadian ice hockey player (born 2002)

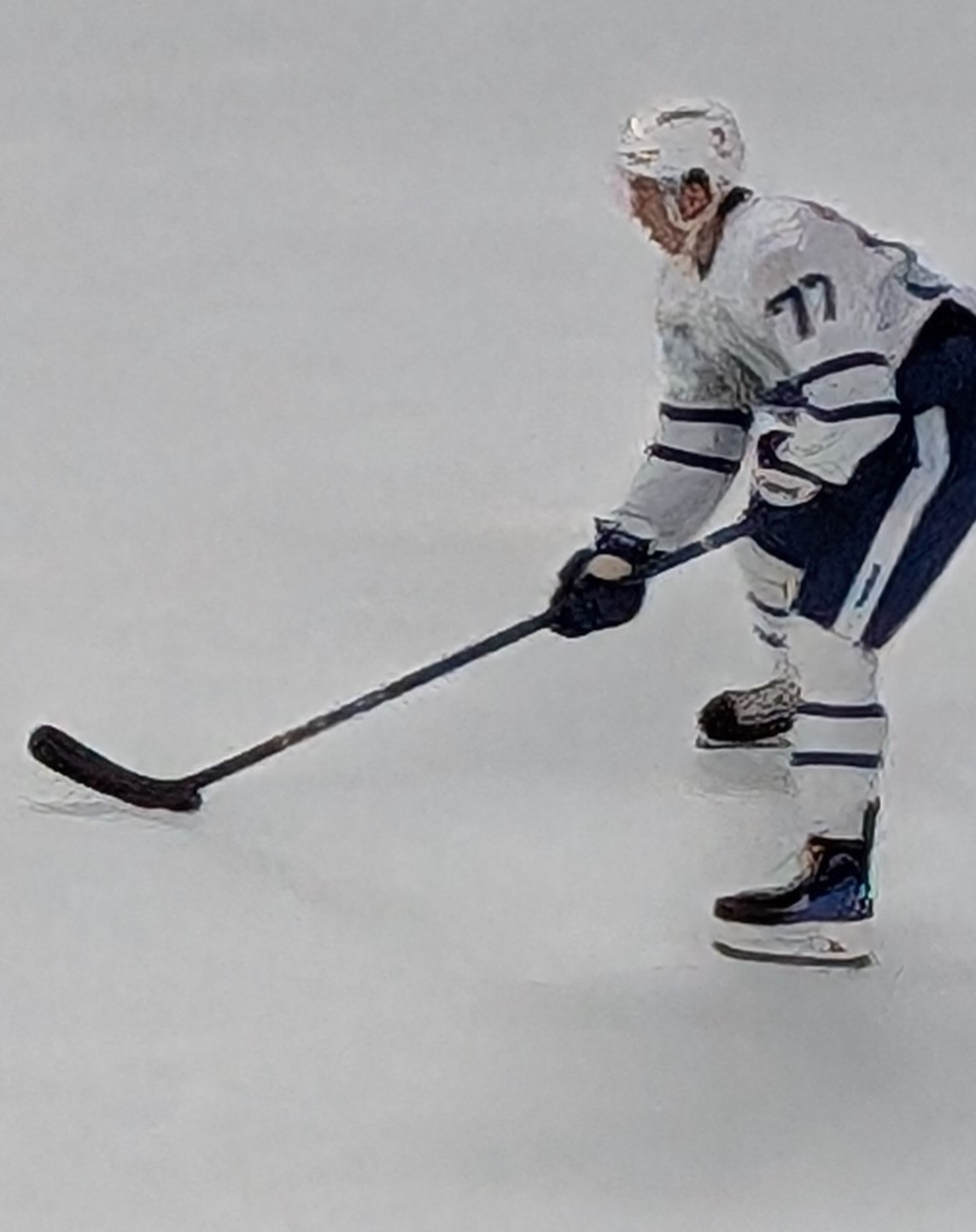
- Born: January 30, 2002 (age 24) Richmond Hill, Ontario, Canada
- Height: 5 ft 11 in (180 cm)
- Weight: 187 lb (85 kg; 13 st 5 lb)
- Position: Centre
- Shoots: Right
- NHL team (P) Cur. team: Toronto Maple Leafs; Toronto Marlies (AHL)
- NHL draft: 213th overall, 2020; Toronto Maple Leafs
- Playing career: 2023–present

Ryan Todd Tverberg (born January 30, 2002) is a Canadian professional ice hockey centre for the Toronto Marlies in the American Hockey League (AHL) as a prospect to the Toronto Maple Leafs of the National Hockey League (NHL). He was named to the All-American team while playing with the University of Connecticut in 2022.

== Playing career ==
Tverberg played Junior A hockey for the Toronto Jr. Canadiens. After going scoreless in 14 games in his first season, Tverberg had a tremendous season in 2020, finishing third on the team in scoring. After leading the Canadiens with 4 goals in their short playoff run, he was selected by the Toronto Maple Leafs in the seventh round of the 2020 NHL entry draft.

Despite the uncertainty caused by the COVID-19 pandemic, Tverberg began attending the University of Connecticut that fall. When the NCAA season finally began, he served as a depth player for the Huskies. He appeared in 14 of 23 games for UConn as a freshman, recording 7 points. By the start of his second season, the Huskies were back to playing a full schedule of games and Tverberg took full advantage. Now a full-time participant, he led the club with 14 goals and helped UConn reach the Hockey East Championship Game for the first time in program history. For his strong performance as the offensive leader of a surprising Huskies team, Tverberg was named to the East All-American second team.

Following his junior season with Huskies in 2022–23, Tverberg concluded his collegiate career by signing a three-year, entry-level contract to begin in the 2023–24 season with the Toronto Maple Leafs on March 15, 2023. He was immediately signed to a professional tryout contract to join the Maple Leafs' AHL affiliate, the Toronto Marlies, for the remainder of the season. Tverberg attended the Maple Leafs' 2023 training camp, but was assigned to the Marlies to start the 2023–24 season.

On July 4, 2026, Tverberg signed a one-year, two-way contract with the Maple Leafs worth $850,000, with a salary of $250,000 in the minors and $350,000 guaranteed.

== Career statistics ==
			Regular season					Playoffs
Season	Team	League	GP	G	A	Pts	PIM	GP	G	A	Pts	PIM
2018–19	Toronto Jr. Canadiens	OJHL	9	0	0	0	10	5	0	0	0	2
2019–20	Toronto Jr. Canadiens	OJHL	47	26	25	51	50	5	4	1	5	12
2020–21	Alberni Valley Bulldogs	BCHL	7	1	4	5	0	—	—	—	—	—
2020–21	U. of Connecticut	HE	14	4	3	7	16	—	—	—	—	—
2021–22	U. of Connecticut	HE	36	14	18	32	16	—	—	—	—	—
2022–23	U. of Connecticut	HE	35	15	15	30	34	—	—	—	—	—
2022–23	Toronto Marlies	AHL	7	0	0	0	2	—	—	—	—	—
2023–24	Toronto Marlies	AHL	46	9	23	32	18	—	—	—	—	—
2024–25	Toronto Marlies	AHL	46	4	7	11	18	—	—	—	—	—
2025–26	Toronto Marlies	AHL	63	15	21	36	36	24	6	8	14	21
2025–26	Toronto Maple Leafs	NHL	2	0	0	0	2	—	—	—	—	—
NHL totals			2	0	0	0	2	—	—	—	—	—

== Awards and honours ==
Award	Year
College
All-Hockey East First Team	2021–22
All-Hockey East Second Team	2022–23
AHCA East Second Team All-American	2021–22
AHL
Calder Cup champion	2026
