= Wilmer Skoog =

Swedish ice hockey player (born 1999)

- Skoog with the Charlotte Checkers in 2024
- Born: 17 July 1999 (age 27) Stockholm, Sweden
- Height: 188 cm (6 ft 2 in)
- Weight: 89 kg (196 lb; 14 st 0 lb)
- Position: Forward
- Shoots: Left
- NHL team (P) Cur. team Former teams: Detroit Red Wings; Grand Rapids Griffins (AHL); Florida Panthers
- NHL draft: Undrafted
- Playing career: 2023–present

Wilmer Skoog (born 17 July 1999) is a Swedish professional ice hockey forward for the Grand Rapids Griffins of the American Hockey League (AHL), while under contract to the Detroit Red Wings of the National Hockey League (NHL). He previously played for the Florida Panthers of the NHL. He played college ice hockey at Boston University.

== Playing career ==
=== College ===
Skoog began his college ice hockey for Boston University during the 2019–20 season after the holiday break. He made his collegiate debut on 8 January 2020, against Brown, and scored the game-winning overtime goal. On 3 February 2020, during the Beanpot semifinals against Boston College, he scored the game-winning double-overtime goal to help Boston University advance to the Beanpot championship game. He finished his freshman season with five goals and two assists in 17 games. During the 2020–21 season, in his sophomore year, he recorded four goals and four assists in 14 games.

During the 2021–22 season, in his junior year, he led the team with a career-high 15 goals and ranked second on the team with a career-high 15 assists. Following the season he was named to the All-Hockey East Second Team. During the 2022–23 season, in his senior year, he recorded a career-high 16 goals and 15 assists in 37 games, and was named to the All-Hockey East Third Team.

=== Professional ===
On 19 April 2023, Skoog signed a one-year, AHL contract with the Charlotte Checkers. During the 2023–24 season, in his first season in the AHL, he recorded 22 goals and nine assists in 49 games. On 12 April 2024, he signed a one-year, two-way contract with the Florida Panthers. During the 2024–25 season, he recorded nine goals and 15 assists in 72 regular season games. He also recorded four goals and three assists in 18 games during the 2025 Calder Cup playoffs, helping the Checkers reach the Calder Cup final. On 17 July 2025, he signed another one-year, two-way contract with the Panthers.

Skoog began the 2025–26 season with the Checkers of the AHL. On 11 April 2026, he was recalled by the Florida Panthers. Prior to being recalled he recorded 18 goals and 19 assists in 59 games with the Checkers, and ranked in the top-five in goals, assists and points on the team. He made his NHL debut for the Panthers later that day against the Toronto Maple Leafs and recorded two shots on goal in 15:49. On 16 April 2026, he was returned to the Checkers following the conclusion of the NHL regular season. He recorded two assists in three NHL games.

On 1 July 2026, he signed a one-year, two-way contract with the Detroit Red Wings.

== Career statistics ==
			Regular season					Playoffs
Season	Team	League	GP	G	A	Pts	PIM	GP	G	A	Pts	PIM
2019–20	Boston University	HE	17	5	2	7	20	—	—	—	—	—
2020–21	Boston University	HE	14	4	4	8	2	—	—	—	—	—
2021–22	Boston University	HE	35	15	15	30	20	—	—	—	—	—
2022–23	Boston University	HE	37	16	15	31	28	—	—	—	—	—
2023–24	Florida Everblades	ECHL	20	2	6	8	6	—	—	—	—	—
2023–24	Charlotte Checkers	AHL	49	22	9	31	12	3	0	0	0	0
2024–25	Charlotte Checkers	AHL	72	9	15	24	63	18	4	3	7	10
2025–26	Charlotte Checkers	AHL	61	18	19	37	51	3	0	1	1	0
2025–26	Florida Panthers	NHL	3	0	2	2	4	—	—	—	—	—
NHL totals			3	0	2	2	4	—	—	—	—	—

== Awards and honors ==
Award	Year	Ref
College
All-Hockey East Second Team	2022	
All-Hockey East Third Team	2023	
