= Vermont Catamounts men's ice hockey statistical leaders =

The Vermont Catamounts men's ice hockey statistical leaders are individual statistical leaders of the Vermont Catamounts men's ice hockey program in various categories, including goals, assists, points, and saves. Within those areas, the lists identify single-game, single-season, and career leaders. The Catamounts represent the University of Vermont in the NCAA's Hockey East.

Vermont began competing in intercollegiate ice hockey in 1963. These lists are updated through the end of the 2020–21 season.

== Goals ==
Career
Rk	Player	Goals	Seasons
1	Éric Perrin	107	1993–94 1994–95 1995–96 1996–97
2	Tim O'Connell	99	1972–73 1973–74 1974–75 1975–76
3	Martin St. Louis	91	1993–94 1994–95 1995–96 1996–97
4	Craig Homola	88	1977–78 1978–79 1979–80 1980–81
5	Kyle McDonough	87	1985–86 1986–87 1987–88 1988–89
6	Kirk McCaskill	83	1979–80 1980–81 1981–82 1982–83
7	Randy Koch	73	1974–75 1975–76 1976–77 1977–78
	Michel Lebeau	73	1973–74 1974–75 1975–76 1976–77
9	Ted Castle	71	1971–72 1972–73 1973–74
10	Andy Halford	69	1974–75 1975–76 1976–77 1977–78

Season
Rk	Player	Goals	Season
1	Tim O'Connell	41	1974–75
2	Tom Cullity	33	1979–80
3	Kirk McCaskill	30	1981–82
	Bill Koch	30	1974–75
	Pat Wright	30	1972–73
6	Éric Perrin	29	1995–96
	Martin St. Louis	29	1995–96
	J.C. Ruid	29	1995–96

Single Game
Rk	Player	Goals	Season	Opponent
1	Craig Homola	5	1980–81	US International

== Assists ==
Career
Rk	Player	Assists	Seasons
1	Martin St. Louis	176	1993–94 1994–95 1995–96 1996–97
2	Éric Perrin	149	1993–94 1994–95 1995–96 1996–97
3	Tim O'Connell	135	1972–73 1973–74 1974–75 1975–76
4	Craig Homola	117	1977–78 1978–79 1979–80 1980–81
5	Louis Cote	114	1976–77 1977–78 1978–79 1979–80
6	Roger Mallette	103	1971–72 1972–73 1973–74 1974–75
7	Dominique Ducharme	95	1991–92 1992–93 1993–94 1994–95
8	John Glynne	93	1973–74 1974–75 1975–76 1976–77
	Randy Koch	93	1974–75 1975–76 1976–77 1977–78
10	Pat Wright	91	1970–71 1971–72 1972–73

Season
Rk	Player	Assists	Season
1	Martin St. Louis	56	1995–96
	Éric Perrin	56	1995–96
3	Martin St. Louis	48	1994–95
4	Craig Homola	41	1979–80
	Tim O'Connell	41	1974–75
6	Éric Perrin	39	1994–95
7	John Glynne	38	1974–75
	Pat Wright	38	1972–73
9	Randy Koch	37	1975–76
	Roger Mallette	37	1974–75

Single Game
Rk	Player	Assists	Season	Opponent
1	Kevin Foster	7	1983–84	Norwich

== Points ==
Career
Rk	Player	Points	Seasons
1	Martin St. Louis	267	1993–94 1994–95 1995–96 1996–97
2	Éric Perrin	256	1993–94 1994–95 1995–96 1996–97
3	Tim O'Connell	234	1972–73 1973–74 1974–75 1975–76
4	Craig Homola	205	1977–78 1978–79 1979–80 1980–81
5	Randy Koch	166	1974–75 1975–76 1976–77 1977–78
6	Kyle McDonough	163	1985–86 1986–87 1987–88 1988–89
7	Roger Mallette	160	1971–72 1972–73 1973–74 1974–75
8	Pat Wright	152	1970–71 1971–72 1972–73
9	Andy Halford	149	1974–75 1975–76 1976–77 1977–78
	Dominique Ducharme	149	1991–92 1992–93 1993–94 1994–95

Season
Rk	Player	Points	Season
1	Martin St. Louis	85	1995–96
	Éric Perrin	85	1995–96
3	Tim O'Connell	82	1974–75
4	Martin St. Louis	71	1994–95
5	Craig Homola	69	1978–79
6	Pat Wright	68	1972–73
7	Éric Perrin	67	1994–95
8	Tom Cullity	62	1979–80
9	Bill Koch	60	1974–75
	Martin St. Louis	60	1996–97

== Saves ==
Career
Rk	Player	Saves	Seasons
1	Tim Thomas	3950	1993–94 1994–95 1995–96 1996–97
2	Stefanos Lekkas	3913	2016–17 2017–18 2018–19 2019–20
3	Rob Madore	3352	2008–09 2009–10 2010–11 2011–12
4	Joe Fallon	2907	2004–05 2005–06 2006–07 2007–08
5	Tom Draper	2806	1983–84 1984–85 1985–86 1986–87
6	Sylvain Turcotte	2394	1977–78 1978–79 1979–80 1980–81
7	Mike Millham	2297	1987–88 1988–89 1989–90 1990–91
8	Gabriel Carriere	2295	2020–21 2021–22 2022–23 2023–24
9	Andrew Allen	2159	1997–98 1998–99 1999–00 2000–01
10	Tom McNamara	2115	1973–74 1974–75 1975–76 1976–77

Season
Rk	Player	Saves	Season
1	Tim Thomas	1079	1996–97
2	Tim Thomas	1069	1995–96
3	Stefanos Lekkas	1049	2017–18
4	Stefanos Lekkas	1040	2018–19
5	Rob Madore	1022	2010–11
6	Stefanos Lekkas	973	2019–20
7	Tim Thomas	961	1994–95
8	Brody Hoffman	942	2012–13
9	Stefanos Lekkas	934	2016–17
10	Tom McNamara	902	1974–75

Single Game
Rk	Player	Saves	Season	Opponent
1	Travis Russell	52	2002–03	Harvard
	Dave Reece	52	1969–70	UNH
