= Ledyard Bank Classic =

- Sport: College ice hockey
- Founded: 1978
- No. of teams: 4
- Venue: Thompson Arena
- Most recent champion: Providence
- Most titles: Dartmouth (8)

The Ledyard Bank Classic (formerly the Auld Lang Syne Classic) is a college Division I men's ice hockey tournament played before New Years at the Thompson Arena in Hanover, New Hampshire, the home arena for Dartmouth College.

The tournament was first held in 1978 and was usually played on the final two days of December every year until 1988. Since then it was played infrequently (though with no more than a two-year gap between events) until 2008 when it returned to an annual schedule which it continues to possess. In 2002 the holiday tournament changed its name from 'Auld Lang Syne' to 'Ledyard Bank' due to sponsorship.

The 2016 tournament featured a predetermined schedule, as opposed to an elimination format, which prevented a traditional championship game. Winner and placement as determined by record, as UMass Lowell's two regulation wins secured a title over Dartmouth's one win and one shootout win. Army secured third place with a regulation win and shootout loss, and Colgate finished fourth with two regulation losses.

Due to the COVID-19 pandemic, the tournament was not held in 2020. In 2021, the tournament returned to an elimination schedule, with Day 1's respective winning and losing teams facing each other the next day.

== Yearly results ==
Year	Champion	Runner-up	Third place	Fourth place	MVP
2024	Providence	Dartmouth	Northeastern	Alaska Anchorage	Graham Gamache, Providence
2023	Maine	Dartmouth	RIT	Lake Superior State	Harrison Scott, Maine
2022	Providence	Merrimack	Dartmouth	Yale	Bennett Schimek, Providence
2021	Boston College	Dartmouth	New Hampshire	Mercyhurst	Jack McBain, Boston College
2019	Dartmouth	Colorado College	Connecticut	St. Lawrence	Quin Foreman, Dartmouth
2018	Providence	Dartmouth	Brown	Army	Scott Conway, Providence
2017	Minnesota–Duluth	Dartmouth	Yale	New Hampshire	Hunter Shepard, Minnesota–Duluth
2016	Massachusetts–Lowell	Dartmouth	Army	Colgate	Joe Gambardella, Massachusetts–Lowell
2015	Dartmouth	Union	Robert Morris	Merrimack	Nick Bligh, Dartmouth
2014	Boston College	Dartmouth	Denver	Brown	Teddy Doherty, Boston College
2013	Air Force	Providence	Northeastern; Dartmouth		Mitch Torrel, Air Force
2012	Massachusetts	Dartmouth	New Hampshire	Bemidji State	Branden Gracell, Massachusetts
2011	St. Lawrence	Dartmouth	Merrimack	Holy Cross	Kyle Flanagan, St. Lawrence
2010	Boston College	Mercyhurst	Dartmouth	Colgate	Paul Carey, Boston College
2009	Northeastern	Massachusetts–Lowell	Holy Cross	Dartmouth	Chris Rawlings, Northeastern
2008	Dartmouth	Bemidji State	Massachusetts	Army	Kyle Reeds, Dartmouth
2006	North Dakota	St. Lawrence	Boston University	Dartmouth	Ryan Duncan, North Dakota
2004	Dartmouth	Vermont	Providence	Bowling Green	Sean Samuel, Dartmouth
2002	Dartmouth	Massachusetts–Lowell	Notre Dame	Vermont	Kent Gillings, Dartmouth
2000	Vermont	Dartmouth	New Hampshire	Miami	Andrew Allen, Vermont
1998	Vermont	Dartmouth	Mankato State	Air Force	Matt Sanders, Vermont
1996	St. Lawrence	Dartmouth	Northeastern	Massachusetts–Lowell	Derek McLaughlin, St. Lawrence
1994	Vermont	Dartmouth	Illinois–Chicago	Providence	Martin St. Louis, Vermont
1991	Boston University	New Hampshire	Vermont	Dartmouth	Jon Pratt, Boston University
1988	Northeastern	Dartmouth	Vermont	New Hampshire	Rich Burchill, Northeastern
1987	Vermont	Dalhousie	Dartmouth	Providence	Jim Walsh, Vermont
1986	New Hampshire	Holy Cross	Vermont	Dartmouth	Greg Rota, New Hampshire
1985	Vermont	Dartmouth	Maine	Bowdoin	Kyle McDonough, Vermont
1984	New Hampshire	Dartmouth	Vermont	Air Force	Peter Herms, New Hampshire
1983	New Hampshire	Maine	Vermont	Dartmouth	Bruce Gillies, New Hampshire
1982	New Hampshire	Dartmouth	Vermont	Maine	George White, New Hampshire
1981	Dartmouth	Maine	Vermont	New Hampshire	Shaun Teevens, Dartmouth
1980	Dartmouth	St. Lawrence	New Hampshire	Merrimack	Peter Lavery, Dartmouth
1979	Vermont	Dartmouth	Maine	Air Force	Craig Homola, Vermont
1978	Dartmouth	Clarkson	Boston College	Bowdoin	Steve Higgins, Dartmouth

== Team records ==
Team	# of times participated	Titles
Dartmouth	32	8
Vermont	15	6
New Hampshire	12	4
Boston College	4	3
St. Lawrence	5	2
Northeastern	4	2
Providence	7	3
Air Force	4	1
Massachusetts–Lowell	4	1
Boston University	2	1
Massachusetts	2	1
Minnesota–Duluth	1	1
North Dakota	1	1
Maine	5	0
Army	3	0
Holy Cross	3	0
Merrimack	3	0
Bemidji State	2	0
Bowdoin	2	0
Brown	2	0
Colgate	2	0
Mercyhurst	2	0
Bowling Green	1	0
Clarkson	1	0
Colorado College	1	0
Connecticut	1	0
Dalhousie	1	0
Denver	1	0
Illinois–Chicago	1	0
Miami	1	0
Minnesota State	1	0
Notre Dame	1	0
Robert Morris	1	0
Union	1	0
Yale	1	0
