= Louis Côté =

Louis Côté may refer to:

- Louis Côté (politician)
- Louis Côté (ice hockey)
