= Vermont Catamounts men's ice hockey =

Men's ice hockey team

- Current season
- University: University of Vermont
- Conference: Hockey East
- First season: 1925–26
- Head coach: Steve Wiedler; 4th season, 37–61–7 (.386)
- Assistant coaches: Adam Krug; Brendan Bradley; Nate Skidmore
- Arena: Gutterson Fieldhouse; Burlington, Vermont
- Colors: Green and gold

NCAA tournament Frozen Four
- 1996, 2009

NCAA tournament appearances
- 1988, 1996, 1997, 2009, 2010, 2014

Conference tournament champions
- ECAC 2: 1970, 1973, 1974

Conference regular season champions
- ECAC 2: 1972, 1973, 1974; ECAC: 1996

Current uniform

The Vermont Catamounts men's ice hockey team is a National Collegiate Athletic Association (NCAA) Division I college ice hockey program that represents the University of Vermont. The Catamounts are a member of Hockey East, joining in 2005 after competing in ECAC Hockey from 1974 to 2005. They play home games at Gutterson Fieldhouse in Burlington, Vermont. Vermont has appeared in the NCAA Men's Hockey Championship six times since making the move to Division I in 1974–75, including trips to the Frozen Four in 1996 and 2009.

Prior to moving to Division I, UVM competed in ECAC Division II, where it won back-to-back ECAC Division II titles in 1972-73 and 1973–74.

Since 1990, the Catamounts have hosted what is now known as the Catamount Cup tournament, winning the title seven times.

== Alumni ==
The University of Vermont has produced 18 National Hockey League (NHL) players in its history. The seven UVM Alumni who have won Stanley Cup championships are: Ross Colton '18 (Tampa Bay Lightning), Patrick Sharp '02, Viktor Stålberg '09, Éric Perrin '97, and former NHL All-Stars Martin St. Louis '97, Tim Thomas '97 and John LeClair '91.

In 2004, St. Louis was awarded the Hart Memorial Trophy as the NHL's most valuable player, the Art Ross Trophy as the NHL's leading scorer, the Lester B. Pearson Award as the league's most outstanding player in the regular season as judged by the members of the NHL Players Association, and the Bud Light Plus/Minus award. Thomas has won the Vezina Trophy twice as the NHL's top goaltender in 2009 and 2011, and the Conn Smythe Trophy as the most valuable player of the Stanley Cup playoffs in 2011. He also holds the NHL record for best single season save percentage. UVM is the only NCAA program in history to count alumni who have won both the Hart Trophy and the Vezina Trophy, as well as the only NCAA program to generate an Art Ross winner.

A two-time Olympian in 1998 and 2002, LeClair was elected to the United States Hockey Hall of Fame in 2009 after a standout 16-year NHL career where he scored 406 goals. He was a two-time NHL first team All-Star and twice won the Bud Light Plus/Minus Award. LeClair is the only American born player to record three consecutive 50 goal seasons, and is the only NHL player with back to back game winning SCF OT goals.

Other Catamounts who were U.S. Olympians were Thomas (2010), former NHL defenseman Aaron Miller (2002, 2006) and Ryan Gunderson (2018). St. Louis skated for Canada in the 2006 and 2014 Olympics, while Sharp was named to Canada's 2014 Olympic squad. Viktor Stalberg also represented Sweden at the 2018 Olympics. Vermont was one of just five college hockey programs to have at least one alumnus participating in every Olympic games since NHL players began competing in 1998 until 2018 when NHL players did not compete in Olympic competition.

== Season-by-season results ==
Source:

== Head coaches ==
As of the completion of 2025–26 season

Tenure	Coach	Years	Record	Pct.
1963–1965	Bill Ruffer	2	10–14–2	.423
1965–1984	Jim Cross	19	280–251–9	.527
1984–2003	Mike Gilligan	19	279–289–46	.492
2003–2020	Kevin Sneddon	17	251–301–84	.461
2020–2023	Todd Woodcroft	3	20–55–9	.292
2023–present	Steve Wiedler	3	37–61–7	.386
Totals	5 coaches	63 seasons	877–971–157	.477

== All-time scoring leaders ==
=== Career goals leaders ===
Player	Years	Goals
Éric Perrin	1993-97	107
Tim O'Connell	1972-76	99
Martin St. Louis	1993-97	91
Craig Homola	1977-81	88
Kyle McDonough	1985-89	87
Kirk McCaskill	1979-83	83
Randy Koch	1974-78	73
Michel Lebeau	1973-77	73
Ted Castle	1971-74	71
Andy Halford	1974-78	69

Single-season goals record:

- Tim O'Connell, 41 goals in 1974-75

=== Career assists leaders ===
Player	Years	Assists
Martin St. Louis	1993-97	176
Éric Perrin	1993-97	149
Tim O'Connell	1972-76	135
Craig Homola	1977-81	117
Louis Cote	1976-80	114
Roger Mallette	1971-75	103
Dominique Ducharme	1991-95	95
John Glynne	1973-77	93
Randy Koch	1974-78	93
Pat Wright	1970-73	91

Single-season assists record:

- Martin St. Louis/Éric Perrin, 56 assists in 1995-96

=== Career points leaders ===
Player	Years	Goals	Assists	Points
Martin St. Louis	1993-97	91	176	267
Éric Perrin	1993-97	107	149	256
Tim O'Connell	1972-76	99	135	234
Craig Homola	1977-81	88	117	205
Randy Koch	1974-78	73	93	166
Kyle McDonough	1985-89	87	76	163
Roger Mallette	1971-75	57	103	160
Pat Wright	1970-73	61	91	152
Andy Halford	1974-78	69	80	149
Dominique Ducharme	1991-95	54	95	149

Single-season points record:

- Martin St. Louis/Éric Perrin, 85 points in 1995-96

== Goaltending leaders ==
Career save percentage leaders (min. 40 games):

Player	Years	GAA	Saves	Save%
Stefanos Lekkas	2016-20	2.61	3913	.918
Joe Fallon	2004-08	2.05	2907	.916
Tim Thomas	1993-97	2.70	3950	.914
Brody Hoffman	2012-15	2.45	1934	.914
Mike Santaguida	2013–17	2.45	1686	.913
Gabe Carriere	2020-24	2.77	2295	.908
Christian Soucy	1991-93	2.99	1725	.908
John Kiely	1971-74	2.84	N/A	.903
Rob Madore	2008-12	2.91	3352	.902
Dave Reece	1968-71	3.01	2019	.900

Single-season save record:

- Tim Thomas, 1,079 in 1996-97

== Current roster ==
As of August 31, 2025.

No.	Nat.	Player	Class	Pos	Height	Weight	DoB	Hometown	Previous team	NHL rights
2	(United States)	Caeden Herrington	Freshman	D	6' 2" (1.88 m)	205 lb (93 kg)	2006-01-26	Manchester, Vermont	Lincoln Stars (USHL)	LAK, 120th overall 2025
4	(Sweden)	Philip Törnqvist	Senior	D	6' 0" (1.83 m)	181 lb (82 kg)	2001-08-24	Gothenburg, Sweden	Wichita Falls Warriors (NAHL)	—
5	(United States)	P. J. Forgione	Freshman	D	6' 2" (1.88 m)	214 lb (97 kg)	2004-11-12	Burlington, Vermont	Saginaw Spirit (OHL)	—
6	(United States)	Charlie Kinsman	Sophomore	D	5' 11" (1.8 m)	190 lb (86 kg)	2005-03-17	Orchard Park, New York	Tri-City Storm (USHL)	—
7	(Canada)	Jax Wismer	Sophomore	D	6' 0" (1.83 m)	176 lb (80 kg)	2005-03-03	Newmarket, Ontario	Alberni Valley Bulldogs (BCHL)	—
9	(Canada)	Michael La Starza	Sophomore	F	5' 11" (1.8 m)	190 lb (86 kg)	2004-01-14	Montreal, Quebec	Fargo Force (USHL)	—
10	(United States)	Max Strand	Sophomore	F	5' 10" (1.78 m)	190 lb (86 kg)	2003-09-03	Roseau, Minnesota	Sioux City Musketeers (USHL)	—
11	(United States)	Zach Filak	Freshman	F	6' 1" (1.85 m)	185 lb (84 kg)	2004-01-21	Northville, Michigan	Sarnia Sting (OHL)	—
12	(United States)	Jonah Aegerter	Freshman	F	5' 9" (1.75 m)	183 lb (83 kg)	2004-01-21	Janesville, Wisconsin	Fargo Force (USHL)	—
13	(United States)	Blake Steenerson	Sophomore	F	6' 4" (1.93 m)	194 lb (88 kg)	2005-04-29	Maple Grove, Minnesota	Tri-City Storm (USHL)	—
14	(Canada)	Dawson Good	Junior	F	6' 1" (1.85 m)	205 lb (93 kg)	2002-04-17	Abbotsford, British Columbia	Chilliwack Chiefs (BCHL)	—
16	(United States)	Tyler Dysart	Freshman	F	5' 10" (1.78 m)	170 lb (77 kg)	2004-06-30	Sunnyvale, California	Sioux City Musketeers (USHL)	—
17	(United States)	Colin Kessler	Sophomore	F	6' 1" (1.85 m)	181 lb (82 kg)	2004-06-07	Anchorage, Alaska	Sioux City Musketeers (USHL)	—
18	(Canada)	Massimo Lombardi	Senior	F	5' 10" (1.78 m)	195 lb (88 kg)	2002-05-18	Beaconsfield, Quebec	Cowichan Valley Capitals (BCHL)	—
19	(Canada)	Cédrick Guindon	Freshman	F	5' 10" (1.78 m)	181 lb (82 kg)	2004-04-21	Rockland, Ontario	Kingston Frontenacs (OHL)	MTL, 127th overall 2022
20	(Canada)	Xavier Henry	Senior	D	6' 5" (1.96 m)	216 lb (98 kg)	2001-03-20	Scarborough, Ontario	Chilliwack Chiefs (BCHL)	—
21	(United States)	Daniel Sambuco	Junior	F	6' 0" (1.83 m)	190 lb (86 kg)	2003-06-10	Springfield, Pennsylvania	Lincoln Stars (USHL)	—
22	(Canada)	Ethan Burroughs	Sophomore	F	5' 10" (1.78 m)	183 lb (83 kg)	2003-06-19	Oakville, Ontario	St. Francis Xavier (AUS)	—
23	(United States)	Dylan Gratton	Senior	D	6' 0" (1.83 m)	180 lb (82 kg)	2003-02-25	Pottstown, Pennsylvania	Omaha (NCHC)	—
25	(United States)	Jack Malinski	Junior	D	5' 10" (1.78 m)	170 lb (77 kg)	2002-06-23	Lakeville, Minnesota	Austin Bruins (NAHL)	—
26	(Canada)	Thomas Sinclair	Senior	F	6' 3" (1.91 m)	194 lb (88 kg)	2002-12-26	Toronto, Ontario	Fargo Force (USHL)	—
27	(Canada)	Duncan Ramsay	Junior	D	6' 5" (1.96 m)	205 lb (93 kg)	2004-02-08	Halifax, Nova Scotia	Chilliwack Chiefs (BCHL)	—
29	(United States)	Jens Richards	Senior	F	6' 2" (1.88 m)	194 lb (88 kg)	2002-12-14	Detroit Lakes, Minnesota	Austin Bruins (NAHL)	—
34	(United States)	Aiden Wright	Freshman	G	6' 1" (1.85 m)	190 lb (86 kg)	2005-10-26	Wake Forest, North Carolina	Sioux Falls Stampede (USHL)	—
37	(United States)	David Sacco	Sophomore	F	6' 1" (1.85 m)	194 lb (88 kg)	2002-01-03	Middleton, Massachusetts	Merrimack (HEA)	—
38	(Sweden)	Sebastian Törnqvist	Junior	D	5' 11" (1.8 m)	187 lb (85 kg)	2003-05-22	Everlöv, Sweden	Massachusetts (HEA)	—
39	(Canada)	Jacob Oster	Freshman	G	6' 3" (1.91 m)	194 lb (88 kg)	2004-03-26	Manotick, Ontario	Oshawa Generals (OHL)	—
50	(Sweden)	Axel Mangbo	Junior	G	6' 3" (1.91 m)	181 lb (82 kg)	2003-04-15	Höganäs, Sweden	Sioux City Musketeers (USHL)	—

== Awards and honors ==
=== Hockey Hall of Fame ===
- Martin St. Louis (2018)

=== United States Hockey Hall of Fame ===
- John LeClair (2009)

=== NCAA ===
==== Individual awards ====
NCAA Scoring Champion

- Martin St. Louis: 1996
- Éric Perrin: 1996

==== All-American teams ====
AHCA College Division All-Americans

- 1968–69: George Kreiner, D
- 1969–70: Dave Reece, G; George Kreiner, D
- 1970–71: Dave Reece, G; Ted Yeates, D
- 1971–72: Ted Yeates, D; Pat Wright, F
- 1972–73: Brad Cooke, D; Pat Wright, F
- 1973–74: John Murphy, D; Ted Castle, F; Willie MacKinnon, F

AHCA First Team All-Americans

- 1974–75: Tim O'Connell, F
- 1978–79: Louis Cote, D
- 1979–80: Louis Cote, D; Craig Homola, F
- 1981–82: Kirk McCaskill, F
- 1988–89: Kyle McDonough, F
- 1994–95: Martin St. Louis, F
- 1995–96: Tim Thomas, G; Éric Perrin, F; Martin St. Louis, F
- 1996–97: Martin St. Louis, F
- 2008–09: Viktor Stålberg, F

AHCA Second Team All-Americans

- 1983–84: Kevin Foster, F
- 1991–92: Christian Soucy, G
- 1992–93: Aaron Miller, D
- 1994–95: Tim Thomas, G
- 2014–15: Mike Paliotta, D

=== ECAC Hockey ===
==== Individual awards ====
Player of the Year

- Craig Homola: 1980
- Martin St. Louis: 1995
- Éric Perrin: 1996

Best Defensive Defenseman

- Jaime Sifers: 2005

Rookie of the Year

- Christian Soucy: 1992
- Éric Perrin: 1994
- Joe Fallon: 2005

Ken Dryden Award

- Tim Thomas: 1996

Tim Taylor Award

- Mike Gilligan: 1988

==== All-Conference teams ====
First Team All-ECAC Hockey

- 1974–75: Tim O'Connell, F
- 1978–79: Louis Cote, D
- 1979–80: Louis Cote, D; Craig Homola, F
- 1981–82: Kirk McCaskill, F
- 1983–84: Kevin Foster, F
- 1985–86: Tom Draper, G
- 1988–89: Kyle McDonough, F
- 1991–92: Christian Soucy, G
- 1992–93: Aaron Miller, D
- 1994–95: Tim Thomas, G; Éric Perrin, F; Martin St. Louis, F
- 1995–96: Tim Thomas, G; Éric Perrin, F; Martin St. Louis, F
- 1996–97: Martin St. Louis, F
- 2003–04: Brady Leisenring, F

Second Team All-ECAC Hockey

- 1974–75: Tom McNamara, G; John Glynne, D
- 1979–80: Sylvain Turcotte, G
- 1987–88: Ian Boyce, F; Kyle McDonough, F
- 1990–91: John LeClair, F
- 1992–93: Christian Soucy, G
- 1996–97: Éric Perrin, F
- 1998–99: Jason Reid, F
- 2004–05: Jaime Sifers, D; Scott Misfud, F

ECAC Hockey All-Rookie Team

- 1987–88: Stephane Venne, D; John LeClair, F
- 1988–89: Jim Larkin, F
- 1989–90: Aaron Miller, D
- 1991–92: Christian Soucy, G; Dominique Ducharme, F
- 1992–93: Matt Johnson, F
- 1993–94: Tim Thomas, G; Éric Perrin, F; Martin St. Louis, F
- 1995–96: Jan Kloboucek, F
- 1997–98: Andrew Allen, G; Andreas Moborg, D
- 2000–01: Patrick Sharp, F
- 2002–03: Jaime Sifers, D
- 2004–05: Joe Fallon, G; Torrey Mitchell, F

=== Hockey East ===
==== Individual awards ====
Rookie of the Year

- Mario Puskarich: 2014

Best Defensive Defenseman

- Mike Paliotta: 2015

Len Ceglarski Award

- Dean Strong: 2009
- Chris McCarthy: 2013

Coach of the Year

- Kevin Sneddon: 2008

==== All-Conference teams ====
First Team All-Hockey East

- 2008–09: Viktor Stålberg, F

Second Team All-Hockey East

- 2013–14: Chris McCarthy, F
- 2014–15: Mike Paliotta, D
- 2018–19: Stefanos Lekkas, G

Third Team All-Hockey East

Hockey East All-Rookie Team

- 2006–07: Brayden Irwin, F
- 2009–10: Sebastian Stalberg, F
- 2011–12: Kyle Reynolds, F
- 2013–14: Mario Puskarich, F
- 2016–17: Ross Colton, F
- 2024–25: Colin Kessler, F

== Olympians ==
This is a list of Vermont alumni who have played on an Olympic team.

Name	Position	Vermont Tenure	Team	Year	Finish
John LeClair	Left Wing	1987–1991	(United States) USA	1998, 2002	6th, Silver
Aaron Miller	Defenseman	1989–1993	(United States) USA	2002, 2006	Silver, 8th
Martin St. Louis	Right Wing	1993–1997	(Canada) CAN	2006, 2014	7th, Gold
Tim Thomas	Goaltender	1993–1997	(United States) USA	2010	7th, Silver
Patrick Sharp	Left Wing	2000–2001	(Canada) CAN	2014	Gold
Ryan Gunderson	Defenseman	2003–2007	(United States) USA	2018	7th
Viktor Stålberg	Left Wing	2006–2009	(Sweden) SWE	2018	5th

== Vermont Athletic Hall of Fame ==
The following is a list of people associated with the Vermont men's ice hockey program who were elected into the Vermont Athletic Hall of Fame (induction date in parentheses).

- Ian Boyce (1999)
- Ted Castle (1985)
- Ted Child (1985)
- George "Red" Cook (1970)
- Louis Cote (1990)
- Thomas Cullity (1990)
- William Dempsey (1984)
- Tom Draper (1997)
- Stephen Eckerson (1988)
- Joe Fallon (2018)
- Kevin Foster (1998)
- Mike Gilligan (2019)
- Richard Healy (1993)
- Craig Homola (1991)
- John Hurley (1981)
- John Kiely (1991)
- Randall Koch (1989)
- William Koch III (1993)
- George Kreiner (1980)
- John LeClair (2001)
- Willie MacKinnon (1984)
- Roger Mallette (1985)
- Kirk McCaskill (1993)
- Kyle McDonough (1999)
- Aaron Miller (2003)
- George Minarsky (1984)
- Torrey Mitchell (2019)
- John Murphy (1999)
- Tim O'Connell (1986)
- Éric Perrin (2007)
- Gary Prior (1995)
- Dave Reece (1981)
- Lee J. Roy (1990)
- Robert Schroeder (1991)
- Jack Semler (1982)
- Jaime Sifers (2016)
- Viktor Stålberg (2020)
- Martin St. Louis (2007)
- Dean Strong (2019)
- Tim Thomas (2007)
- Sylvain Turcotte (1997)
- Chip Uihlein (1989)
- Francis Winchenbach (1973)
- Pat Wright (1983)
- Jim Yeates (1998)
- Ted Yeates (1982)

== Catamounts in the NHL ==
As of July 1, 2025.

= NHL All-Star team	= NHL All-Star	= NHL All-Star and NHL All-Star team	= Hall of Famers

Player	Position	Team(s)	Years	Games	Stanley Cups
Connor Brickley	Left Wing	FLA, NYR	2015–2019	81	0
Ross Colton	Center	TBL, COL	2020–present	331	1
Tom Draper	Goaltender	WPG, BUF, NYI	1988–1996	53	0
Brayden Irwin	Forward	TOR	2009–2010	2	0
John LeClair	Left Wing	MTL, PHI, PIT	1990–2007	967	1
Aaron Miller	Defenseman	QUE, COL, LAK, VAN	1993–2008	677	0
Kevan Miller	Defenseman	BOS	2013–2021	352	0
Graham Mink	Defenseman	WSH	2003–2009	7	0
Torrey Mitchell	Center	SJS, MIN, BUF, MTL	2007–2018	666	0

Player	Position	Team(s)	Years	Games	Stanley Cups
Michael Paliotta	Defenseman	CHI, CBJ	2014–2016	2	0
Éric Perrin	Center	TBL, ATL	2003–2009	245	1
Dave Reece	Goaltender	BOS	1975–1976	14	0
Patrick Sharp	Left Wing	PHI, CHI , DAL	2002–2018	939	3
Jaime Sifers	Defenseman	TOR, MIN	2008–2010	37	0
Christian Soucy	Goaltender	CHI	1993–1994	1	0
Martin St. Louis	Right Wing	CGY, TBL, NYR	1998–2015	1,134	1
Viktor Stålberg	Left Wing	TOR, CHI , NSH, NYR, CAR, OTT	2009–2017	488	1
Tim Thomas	Goaltender	BOS, FLA, DAL	2002–2014	426	1

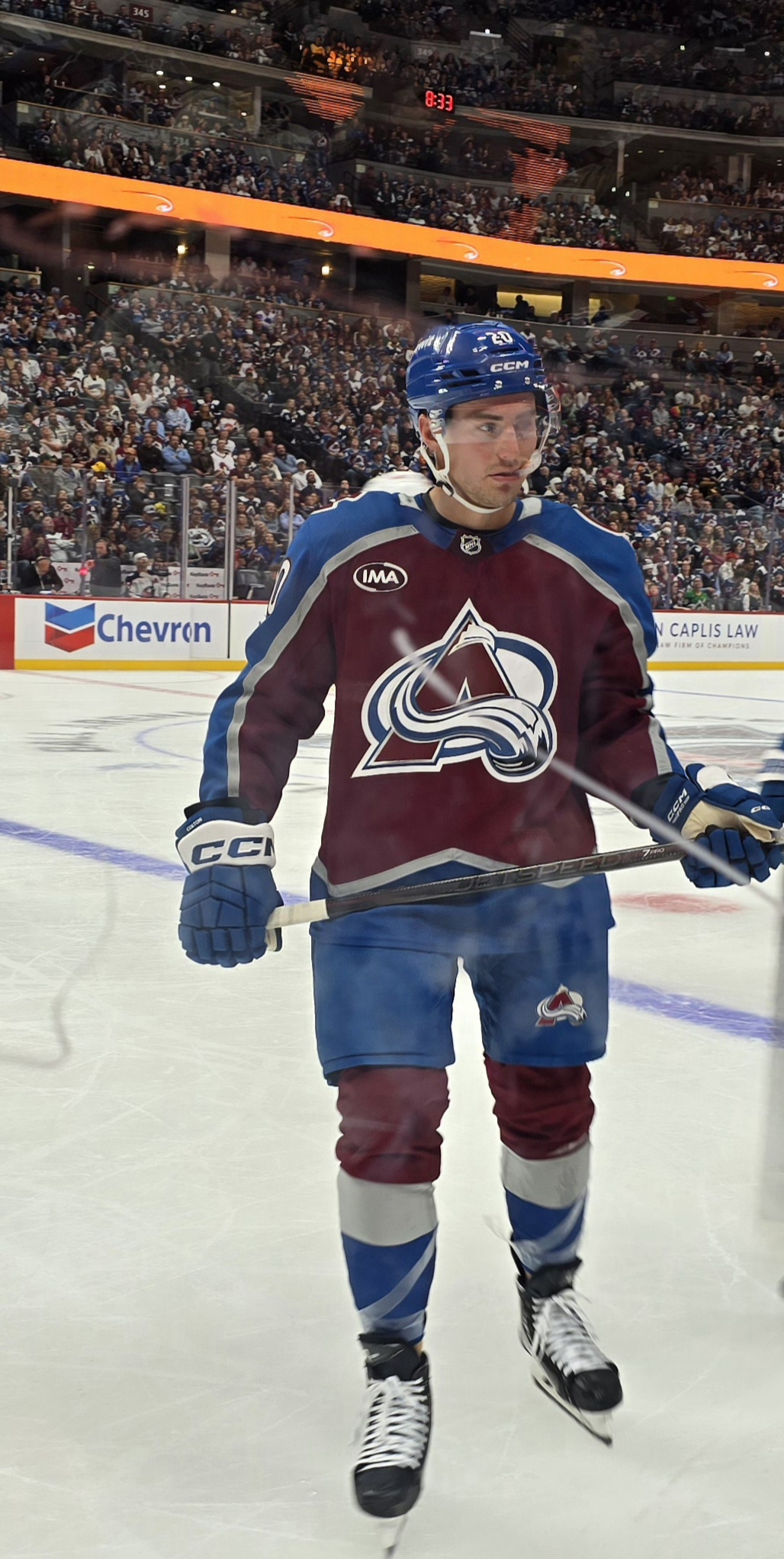
Ross Colton

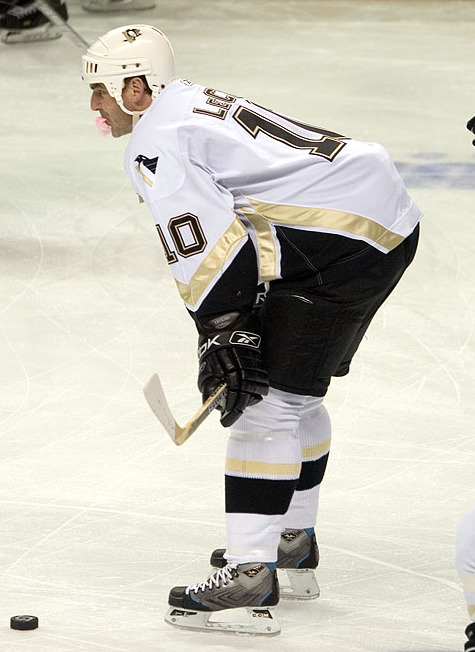
John LeClair

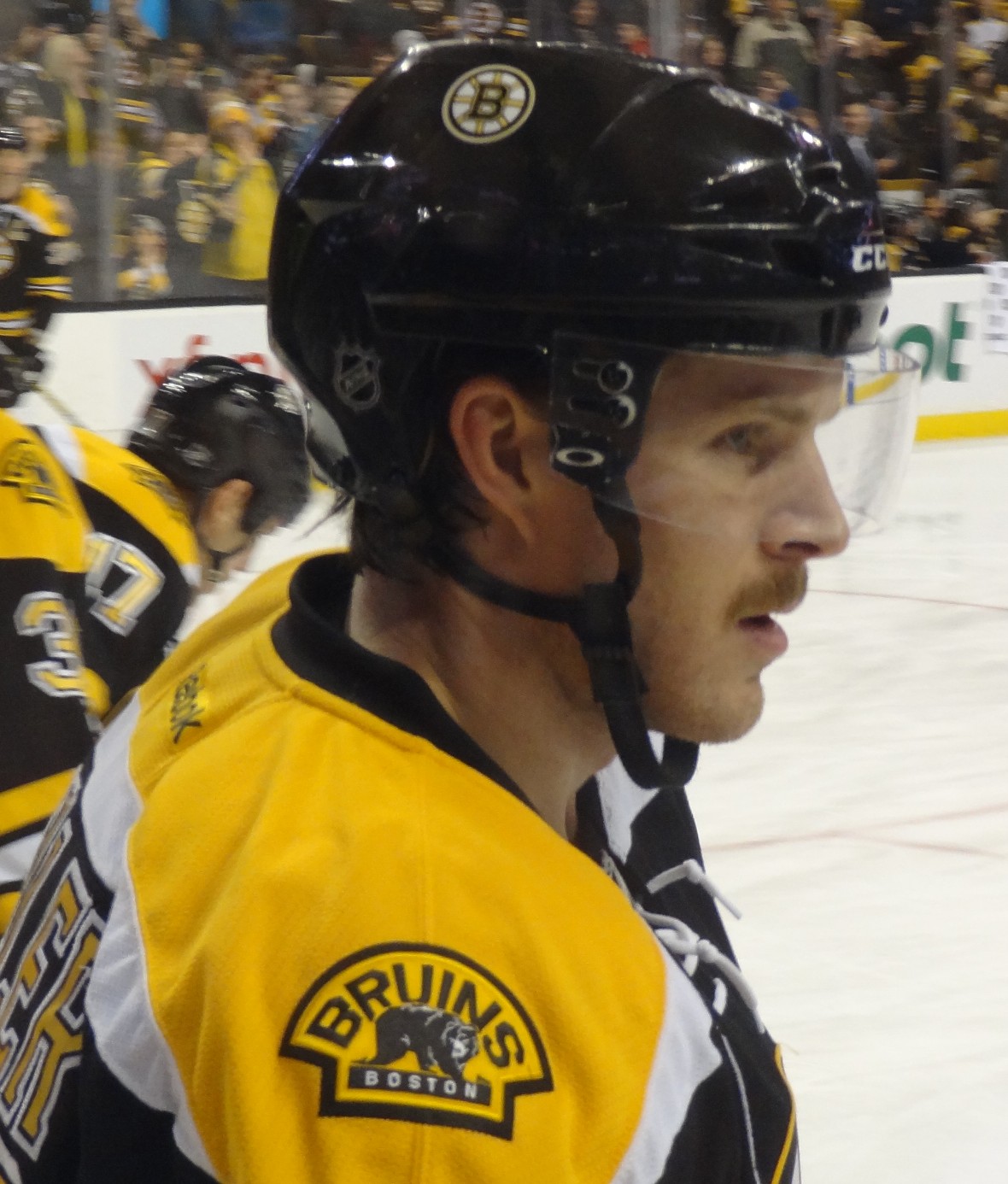
Kevan Miller

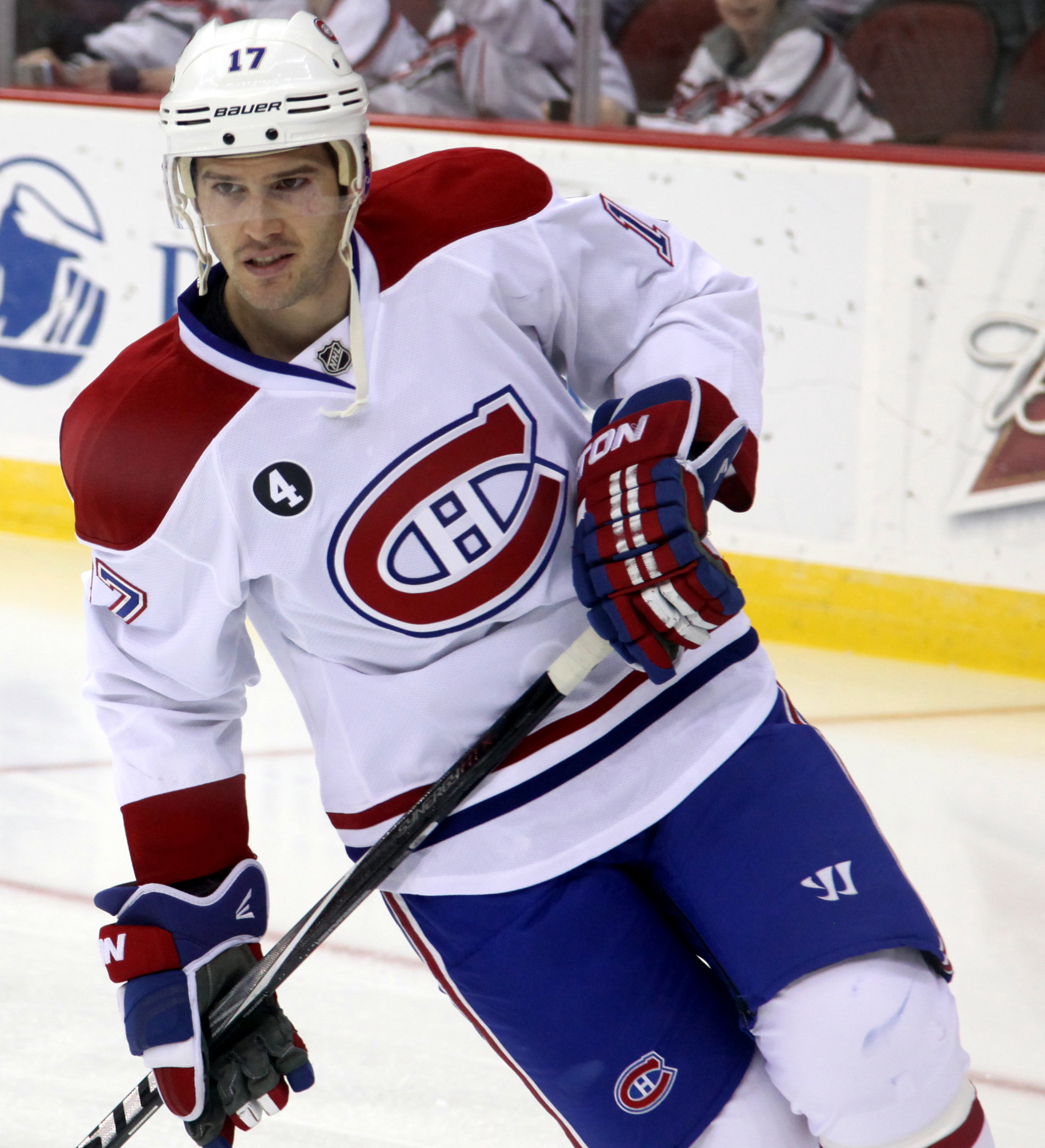
Torrey Mitchell

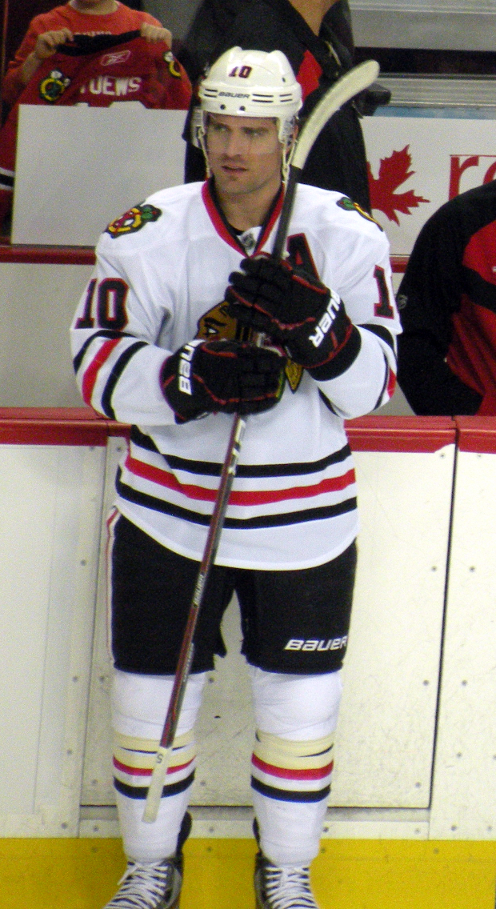
Patrick Sharp

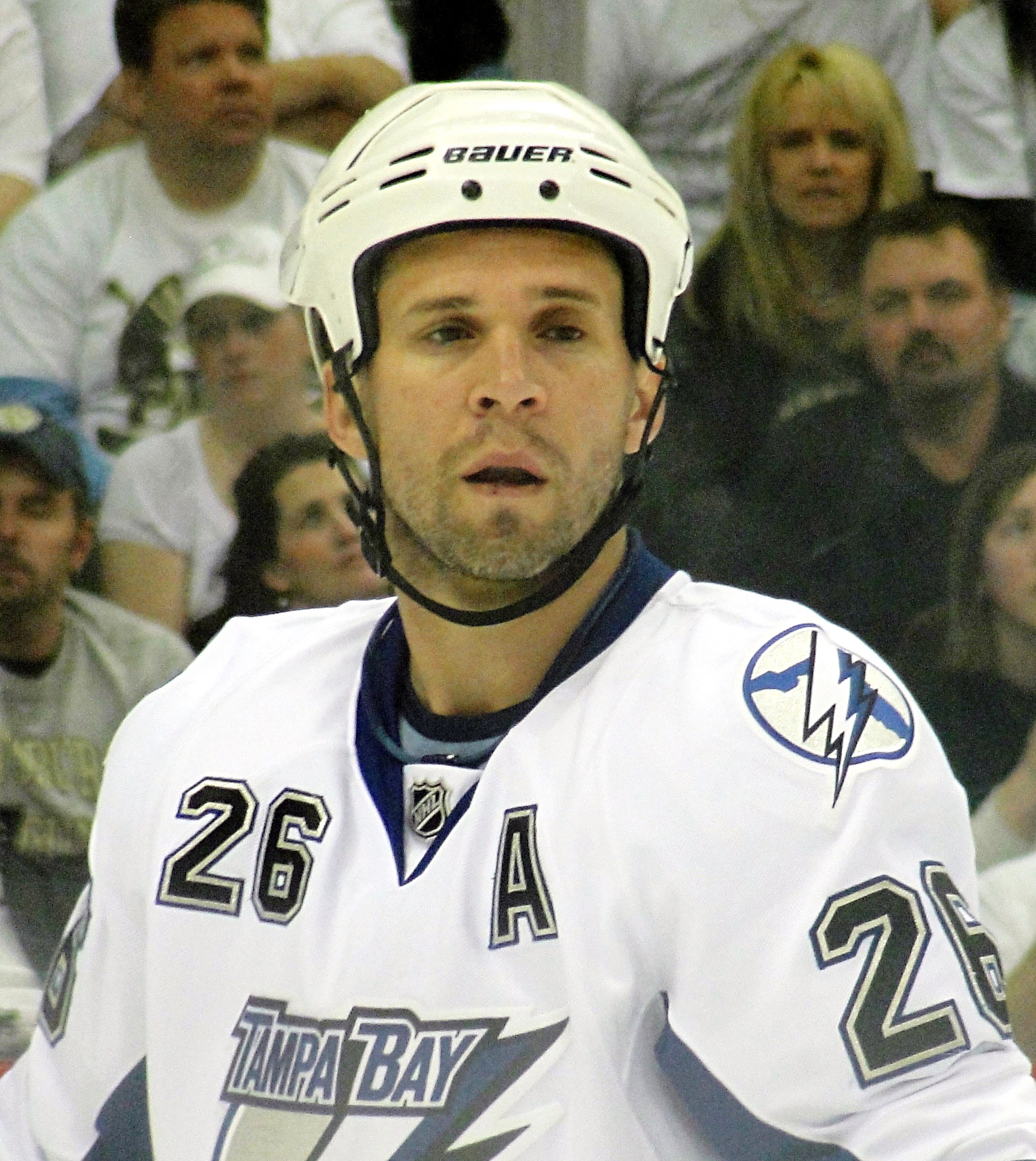
Martin St. Louis

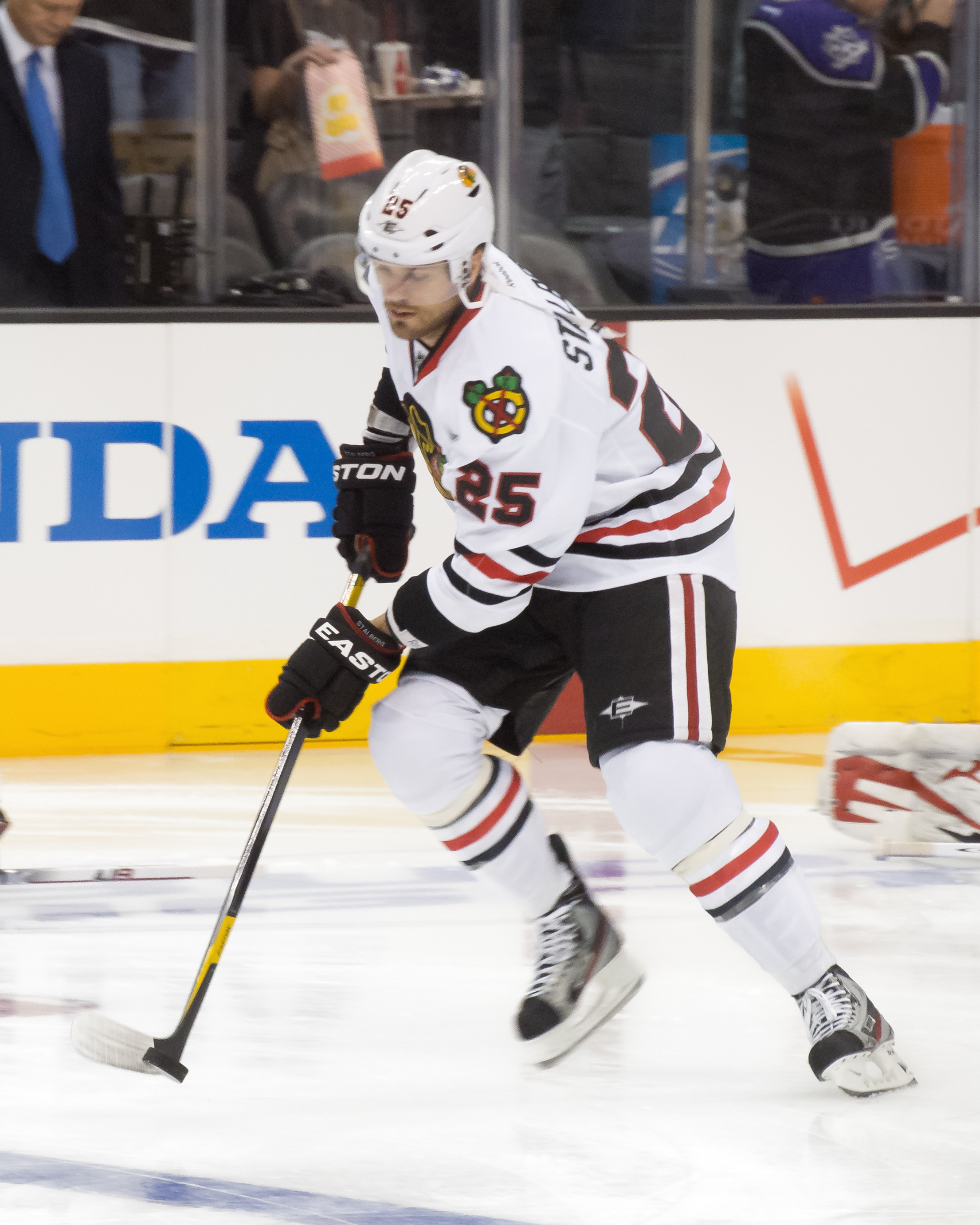
Viktor Stålberg

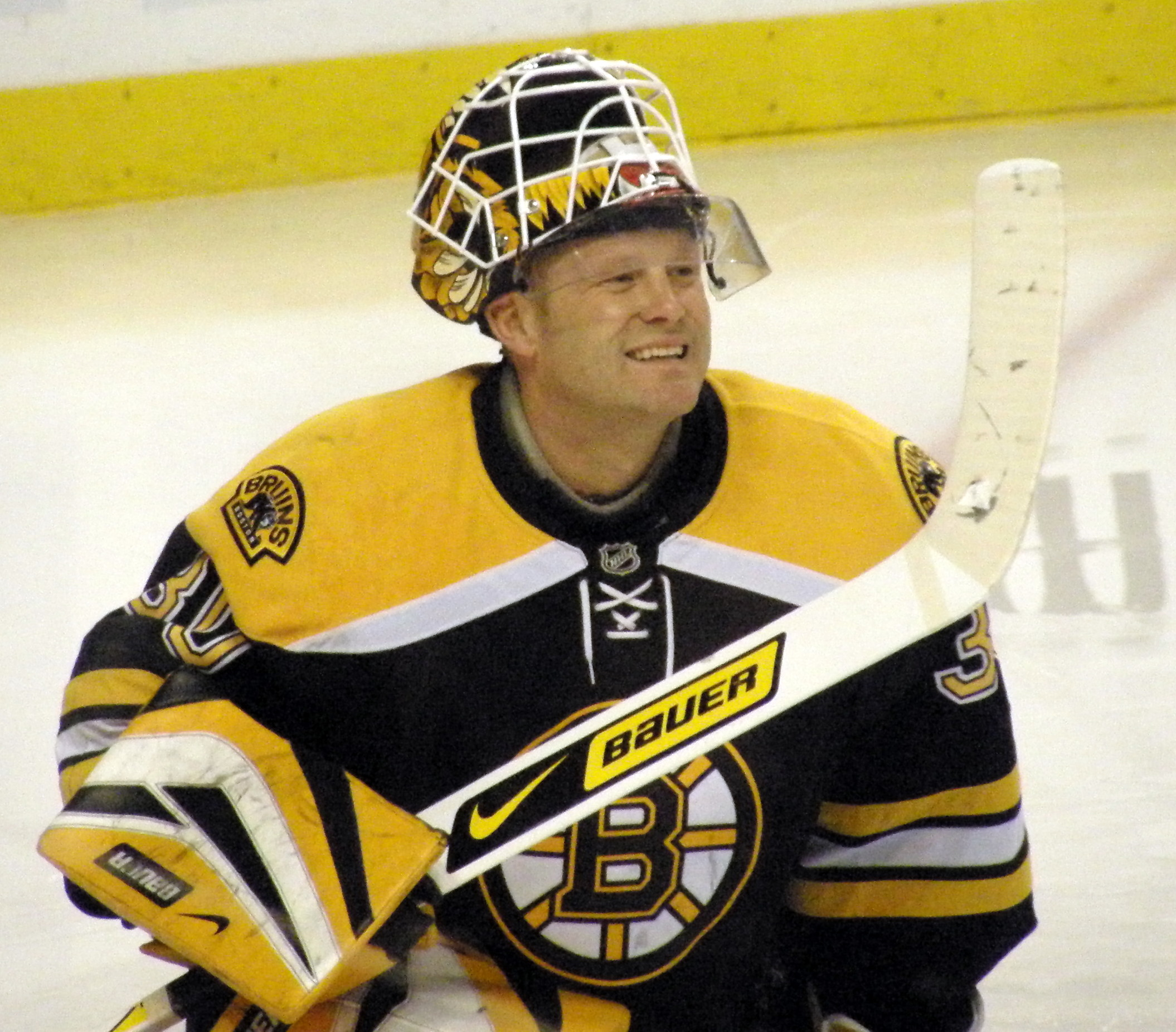
Tim Thomas

== Media ==
All games are broadcast on 620-AM WVMT across the Burlington, VT-Plattsburgh, NY region; Adam LaFleur provides play-by-play.

== See also ==
- Vermont Catamounts women's ice hockey
