= Mike Gilligan =

American ice hockey coach

Biographical details
- Born: Beverly, Massachusetts, U.S.

Playing career
- 1967–1970 1971–1972 1972–1973: Salem State
- Position: Defenseman

Coaching career (HC unless noted)
- 1975–1981: Salem State
- 1981–1983: Yale (Assistant)
- 1983–1984: Yale
- 1984–2003: Vermont
- 2003–2006: US Women's National Team (Assistant)
- 2006–2014: Vermont (Assistant)

Head coaching record
- Overall: 419-350-49

Accomplishments and honors

Championships
- ECAC Hockey Regular Season Champion (1996)

Awards
- 1986 Salem State Athletic Hall of Fame; 1988 ECAC Hockey Coach of the Year; 2005 John MacInnes Award; 2008 Parker-York Award; 2010 Massachusetts Hockey Hall of Fame
Medal record
Women's ice hockey
Representing the USA
Women's World Championships
Gold medal – first place	2005 Sweden
Olympics
Bronze medal – third place	2006 Torino

Mike Gilligan is an American retired ice hockey coach. He was the head coach at Vermont from 1983 through 2003 and later became an assistant with the UVM women's team for seven more seasons before retiring in 2014.

== Career ==
=== Playing ===
Mike Gilligan started as a defenseman for Salem State for three seasons, serving as captain and earning All-American honors in the final two before moving onto a brief minor league career in the early 1970s.

=== Coaching ===
Gilligan returned to Salem State in 1975 to serve as head coach for his alma mater. Playing in ECAC Hockey's now defunct Division II league, Salem State became a powerhouse under Gilligan, winning at least 20 games in each of his six seasons behind the bench. Their best finish came in 1979 when they finished fourth in the NCAA Division II Men's Ice Hockey Championship. After the 1980-81 campaign Gilligan accepted an offer to serve as Tim Taylor's assistant at Yale. Two years later Taylor took a hiatus from the university to serve as an assistant for Team USA at the 1984 Winter Olympics, leaving the Bulldogs in the hands of Gilligan for the 1983–84 season. Gilligan acquitted himself by getting Yale to a 12-13-1 record and after the conclusion of the season was chosen to replace Jim Cross at Vermont

Gilligan's first season with the Catamounts was a disappointing, finishing with an 8-21-0 record, but by the end of his second season he had gotten them back on track, winning 17 games. over the next 12 seasons Vermont would post winning records 10 times and made their first NCAA tournament berth in 1988. Gilligan’s best season came in 1995–96 when he won Vermont's only regular season championship with a 27-win season and saw the Catamounts make the Frozen Four for the first time, finishing third in the 1996 tournament behind the strong play of future NHLers Martin St. Louis and Tim Thomas.

In the 1999–00 season both Gilligan and Vermont were tarnished as a result of a hazing scandal that caused the university to cancel its season after only seventeen games and while it did not lead to Gilligan's dismissal he would never again field a winning team, resigning from his post after the 2002–03 season, one win shy of the school record.

In addition to coaching hockey at the University of Vermont, Gilligan served as the head coach of the catamount golf team from 1993 through 2009.

=== Women's Teams ===
After leaving Vermont Gilligan became an assistant for the US Women's National Team for over two years, helping the team to win gold at the 2005 IIHF Women's World Championship and bronze at Torino the following year. Gilligan returned to Vermont in the fall of 2006 as an assistant for the women's team and remained in that position until his retirement in 2014.

=== Honors ===
Gilligan was inducted into the Salem State Athletic Hall of Fame in 1986 and was co-ECAC Hockey Coach of the Year with Bill Cleary two years later. After retiring as head coach Gilligan was named the 2005 recipient of the John MacInnes Award, the 2008 recipient of the Parker-York Award and was inducted into the Massachusetts Hockey hall of Fame in 2010

== Head coaching record ==
Record table
Season	Team	Overall	Conference	Standing	Postseason
Salem State Vikings (ECAC 2) (1975–1981)
1975–76	Salem State	21–6–0	15–5–0	4th	ECAC 2 Semifinals
1976–77	Salem State	22–5–0		7th	ECAC 2 Quarterfinals
1977–78	Salem State	21–8–0	17–7–0	4th	ECAC 2 Semifinals
1978–79	Salem State	23–11–1	18–8–1	1st	NCAA Consolation Game (Loss)
1979–80	Salem State	21–8–0	19–6–0	4th	ECAC 2 Quarterfinals
1980–81	Salem State	20–10–1	16–6–1	3rd	ECAC 2 Semifinals
Salem State:		128–48–2			
Yale Bulldogs (ECAC Hockey) (1983–1984)
1983-84	Yale	12-13-1	10-10-1	t-9th	
Yale:		12-13-1	10-10-1		
Vermont Catamounts (ECAC Hockey) (1984–2003)
1984-85	Vermont	8-21-0	4-17-0	10th	
1985-86	Vermont	17-13-1	11-10-0	6th	ECAC Quarterfinals
1986-87	Vermont	18-14-0	9-13-0	6th	ECAC Quarterfinals
1987-88	Vermont	21-11-3	14-7-1	4th	NCAA East Regional Quarterfinals
1988-89	Vermont	20-13-1	13-9-0	t-5th	ECAC Runner-Up
1989-90	Vermont	9-20-2	7-13-2	9th	ECAC First Round
1990-91	Vermont	17-14-2	12-8-2	6th	ECAC Quarterfinals
1991-92	Vermont	16-12-3	10-9-3	7th	ECAC Preliminary Round
1992-93	Vermont	12-16-3	10-11-1	7th	ECAC Preliminary Round
1993-94	Vermont	15-12-6	10-6-6	5th	ECAC Quarterfinals
1994-95	Vermont	19-14-2	11-9-2	5th	ECAC Quarterfinals
1995-96	Vermont	27-7-4	17-2-3	1st	NCAA Frozen Four
1996-97	Vermont	22-11-3	13-6-3	3rd	NCAA East Regional Quarterfinals
1997-98	Vermont	10-20-4	7-11-4	t-9th	ECAC First Round
1998-99	Vermont	13-18-2	7-13-2	9th	ECAC First Round
1999-00	Vermont	5-9-3	3-2-2	12th*	Ineligible
2000-01	Vermont	14-18-2	8-12-2	10th	ECAC Four vs. Five
2001-02	Vermont	3-26-2	3-18-1	12th	
2002-03	Vermont	13-20-3	8-14-0	10th	ECAC Quarterfinals
Vermont:		279-289-46	177-190-34		
Total:		419-350-49			
National champion Postseason invitational champion Conference regular season champion Conference regular season and conference tournament champion Division regular season champion Division regular season and conference tournament champion Conference tournament champion

* Vermont canceled the 1999–2000 season after only 17 games due to a hazing scandal.

== See also ==
- List of college men's ice hockey coaches with 400 wins

Awards and achievements
Preceded by Tim Taylor	Tim Taylor Award; 1987–88 With Bill Cleary	Succeeded by Joe Marsh
