= Dean Strong =

Canadian ice hockey player

- Born: July 17, 1985 (age 40) Mississauga, Ontario, Canada
- Height: 5 ft 9 in (175 cm)
- Weight: 174 lb (79 kg; 12 st 6 lb)
- Position: Forward
- Shot: Right
- Played for: Worcester Sharks; Chicago Wolves; Lake Erie Monsters; HC Valpellice
- NHL draft: Undrafted
- Playing career: 2009–2014

Dean Strong (born July 17, 1985) is a retired Canadian professional ice hockey player whose final team was HC Valpellice in Italy's Elite.A league.

== Playing career ==
Undrafted before going pro, he played four seasons of NCAA Division I hockey at the University of Vermont with the Vermont Catamounts men's ice hockey team. During his senior year in the 2008–09 season, he set a school record by playing in his 154th consecutive game. He also served as team captain and led the Catamounts to a Frozen Four appearance.

On August 4, 2011, Strong agreed to a one-year contract extension with the Kalamazoo Wings of the ECHL, entering his third professional season in 2011–12. He started the season with the Chicago Wolves but later played 21 games with the Wings, recording 23 points. He was then loaned to the Lake Erie Monsters for the rest of their regular season, where he appeared in a career-high 54 AHL games and registered 17 points.

Strong rejoined the Lake Erie Monsters on a one-year AHL contract for the next season. After sustaining an early injury and serving as a reserve forward, he was loaned to the Denver Cutthroats, the team's Central Hockey League affiliate, on December 5, 2012. Following a three-game stint, he returned to the Monsters, secured a regular spot on the checking line, and tallied 13 points over 36 games.

As an unrestricted free agent looking to continue his professional career overseas, Dean Strong signed his second European contract on September 2, 2013, agreeing to terms with HC Valpellice, a team competing in Italy's top-tier ice hockey league, Elite.A.

== Career statistics ==
| | | | Regular season | | | | | Playoffs |
| Season | Team | League | GP | G | A | Pts | PIM | GP | G | A | Pts | PIM |
|---|---|---|---|---|---|---|---|---|---|---|---|---|
| 2002–03 | Milton Merchants | OPJHL | 43 | 14 | 7 | 21 | 8 | — | — | — | — | — |
| 2003–04 | Milton Icehawks | OPJHL | 48 | 29 | 32 | 61 | 28 | — | — | — | — | — |
| 2004–05 | Vernon Vipers | BCHL | 56 | 35 | 56 | 91 | 28 | 14 | 6 | 5 | 11 | 16 |
| 2005–06 | University of Vermont | HE | 38 | 9 | 15 | 24 | 21 | — | — | — | — | — |
| 2006–07 | University of Vermont | HE | 39 | 13 | 18 | 31 | 50 | — | — | — | — | — |
| 2007–08 | University of Vermont | HE | 39 | 8 | 20 | 28 | 20 | — | — | — | — | — |
| 2008–09 | University of Vermont | HE | 39 | 5 | 19 | 24 | 10 | — | — | — | — | — |
| 2009–10 | Kalamazoo Wings | ECHL | 34 | 16 | 21 | 37 | 27 | 5 | 1 | 2 | 3 | 0 |
| 2009–10 | Worcester Sharks | AHL | 16 | 2 | 3 | 5 | 2 | 6 | 1 | 1 | 2 | 2 |
| 2010–11 | Eispiraten Crimmitschau | 2.GBun | 25 | 10 | 13 | 23 | 8 | — | — | — | — | — |
| 2010–11 | Kalamazoo Wings | ECHL | 6 | 3 | 4 | 7 | 2 | 15 | 7 | 7 | 14 | 8 |
| 2011–12 | Chicago Wolves | AHL | 5 | 0 | 3 | 3 | 2 | — | — | — | — | — |
| 2011–12 | Kalamazoo Wings | ECHL | 21 | 11 | 12 | 23 | 20 | 8 | 0 | 2 | 2 | 0 |
| 2011–12 | Lake Erie Monsters | AHL | 49 | 4 | 10 | 14 | 10 | — | — | — | — | — |
| 2012–13 | Lake Erie Monsters | AHL | 36 | 5 | 8 | 13 | 12 | — | — | — | — | — |
| 2012–13 | Denver Cutthroats | CHL | 3 | 1 | 0 | 1 | 2 | — | — | — | — | — |
| 2013–14 | HC Valpellice | ITL | 39 | 26 | 23 | 49 | 40 | 4 | 4 | 1 | 5 | 2 |
| AHL totals | | | 106 | 11 | 24 | 35 | 26 | 6 | 1 | 1 | 2 | 2 |

== Awards and honours ==
| Award | Year |
|---|---|
| Hockey East Len Ceglarski Award - Sportsmanship | 2008–09 |

Awards and achievements
| Preceded by Chris Higgins | Len Ceglarski Sportsmanship Award; 2008–09 | Succeeded by Ben Smith |
