= Kevin Foster (ice hockey) =

American ice hockey player (born 1962)

- Born: October 5, 1962 (age 64) Glen Ridge, New Jersey, USA
- Height: 5 ft 8 in (173 cm)
- Weight: 174 lb (79 kg; 12 st 6 lb)
- Position: Left Wing
- Played for: Vermont; Maine Mariners; Fort Wayne Komets; New York Slapshots
- Playing career: 1981–1986

Kevin Foster is an American retired ice hockey left wing who was an All-American for Vermont.

== Career ==
Foster came to the University of Vermont in 1981, at the tail end of Jim Cross's tenure with the program. Despite the team being middling at best, Foster put up respectable numbers as a freshman and was selected for the US national team at the 1983 World Junior Ice Hockey Championships. He was teamed up with Mike O'Connor and future Hobey Baker Award-winner, Scott Fusco and helped the team finish a respectable if disappointing 5th.

Foster's junior season is what made his career as a Catamount. He doubled his career point total in one season and was named an All-American but couldn't prevent Vermont from finishing last in their division. Cross retired after the season and was replaced by Mike Gilligan. Foster was named team captain for his senior season but the results were much the same. Vermont finished near the bottom of the conference standings and Foster's scoring production declined back to where it had been in his first two seasons.

After graduating, Foster played one season of professional hockey before retiring. He was inducted into the Vermont Athletic Hall of Fame in 1998.

== Statistics ==
=== Regular season and playoffs ===
			Regular Season					Playoffs
Season	Team	League	GP	G	A	Pts	PIM	GP	G	A	Pts	PIM
1981–82	Vermont	ECAC Hockey	27	16	14	30	40	—	—	—	—	—
1982–83	Vermont	ECAC Hockey	28	7	20	27	45	—	—	—	—	—
1983–84	Vermont	ECAC Hockey	29	21	36	57	18	—	—	—	—	—
1984–85	Vermont	ECAC Hockey	28	6	20	26	57	—	—	—	—	—
1985–86	Maine Mariners	AHL	7	0	0	0	0	—	—	—	—	—
1985–86	Fort Wayne Komets	IHL	11	1	3	4	10	—	—	—	—	—
1985–86	New York Slapshots	ACHL	25	6	28	34	15	—	—	—	—	—
NCAA totals			112	50	90	140	160	—	—	—	—	—

=== International ===
Year	Team	Event	Result	GP	G	A	Pts	PIM
1983	United States	WJC	5th	7	2	6	8	14

== Awards and honors ==
Award	Year
All-ECAC Hockey First Team	1983–84
AHCA East Second-Team All-American	1983–84
