= Scott Ford (ice hockey) =

Canadian ice hockey player and coach

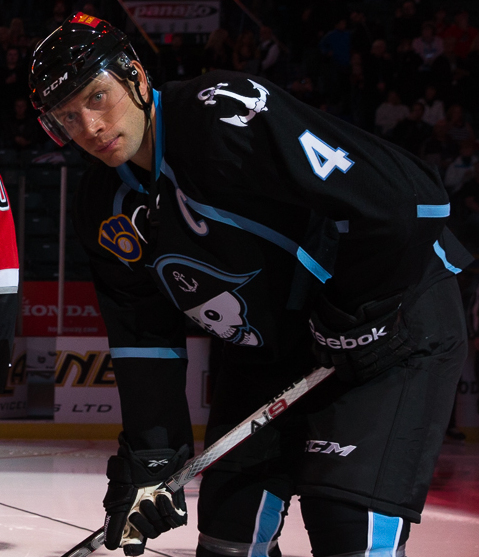
- Ford with the Milwaukee Admirals in 2013
- Born: December 24, 1979 (age 46) Fort St. John, British Columbia, Canada
- Height: 6 ft 3 in (191 cm)
- Weight: 216 lb (98 kg; 15 st 6 lb)
- Position: Defence
- Shot: Right
- Played for: Cleveland Barons; Bridgeport Sound Tigers; Providence Bruins; Milwaukee Admirals; Peoria Rivermen
- NHL draft: Undrafted
- Playing career: 2004–2015

Scott Ford (born December 24, 1979) is a Canadian former professional ice hockey player. He is currently an assistant coach with the Columbus Blue Jackets of the National Hockey League.

== Playing career ==
Undrafted, Ford played for the Milwaukee Admirals, Bridgeport Sound Tigers, Brown Bears, Cleveland Barons, Dayton Bombers, Fresno Falcons, Providence Bruins, Trenton Titans, Utah Grizzlies, and Peoria Rivermen.

During the 2012–13 season, whilst with the Peoria Rivermen, Ford was traded by the St. Louis Blues to the Nashville Predators to mark a return to the Milwaukee Admirals in exchange for Jani Lajunen on February 19, 2013.

A free agent midway into the 2014–15 season, Ford belatedly signed an ECHL contract with the South Carolina Stingrays on December 6, 2014. It marked a return to the ECHL for the first time since 2007.

On September 8, 2015, it was announced that Ford would join the Milwaukee Admirals as an assistant coach for the 2015–16 season.

== Career statistics ==
			Regular season					Playoffs
Season	Team	League	GP	G	A	Pts	PIM	GP	G	A	Pts	PIM
1996–97	Fernie Ghostriders	RMJHL	31	1	8	9	103	—	—	—	—	—
1997–98	Merritt Centennials	BCHL	57	5	9	14	96	3	1	0	1	4
1998–99	Merritt Centennials	BCHL	58	8	24	32	134	5	0	2	2	20
1999–00	Merritt Centennials	BCHL	42	1	14	15	90	13	0	0	0	38
2000–01	Brown University	ECAC	23	2	6	8	18	—	—	—	—	—
2001–02	Brown University	ECAC	31	1	6	7	38	—	—	—	—	—
2002–03	Brown University	ECAC	33	6	11	17	44	—	—	—	—	—
2003–04	Brown University	ECAC	31	6	9	15	30	—	—	—	—	—
2004–05	Cleveland Barons	AHL	1	0	0	0	2	—	—	—	—	—
2004–05	Fresno Falcons	ECHL	17	0	2	2	10	—	—	—	—	—
2005–06	Trenton Titans	ECHL	22	1	4	5	35	—	—	—	—	—
2005–06	Bridgeport Sound Tigers	AHL	2	0	0	0	2	—	—	—	—	—
2005–06	Providence Bruins	AHL	44	1	6	7	72	—	—	—	—	—
2006–07	Dayton Bombers	ECHL	70	10	16	26	113	22	0	7	7	16
2007–08	Utah Grizzlies	ECHL	23	1	11	12	53	—	—	—	—	—
2007–08	Bridgeport Sound Tigers	AHL	54	1	6	7	55	—	—	—	—	—
2008–09	Milwaukee Admirals	AHL	63	4	6	10	128	11	0	1	1	2
2009–10	Milwaukee Admirals	AHL	61	1	7	8	84	5	0	0	0	2
2010–11	Milwaukee Admirals	AHL	80	2	5	7	164	13	0	2	2	10
2011–12	Milwaukee Admirals	AHL	75	4	7	11	89	3	0	0	0	20
2012–13	Peoria Rivermen	AHL	43	2	4	6	54	—	—	—	—	—
2012–13	Milwaukee Admirals	AHL	21	0	1	1	15	4	0	0	0	6
2013–14	Milwaukee Admirals	AHL	66	3	3	6	83	3	0	0	0	0
2014–15	South Carolina Stingrays	ECHL	40	1	4	5	82	27	1	6	7	29
2014–15	Milwaukee Admirals	AHL	12	0	2	2	14	—	—	—	—	—
AHL totals			522	18	47	65	762	39	0	3	3	40

Awards and achievements
Preceded by Douglas Murray	ECAC Hockey Best Defensive Defenseman; 2003–04	Succeeded by Jaime Sifers
