= Éric Perrin =

Canadian ice hockey player (born 1975)

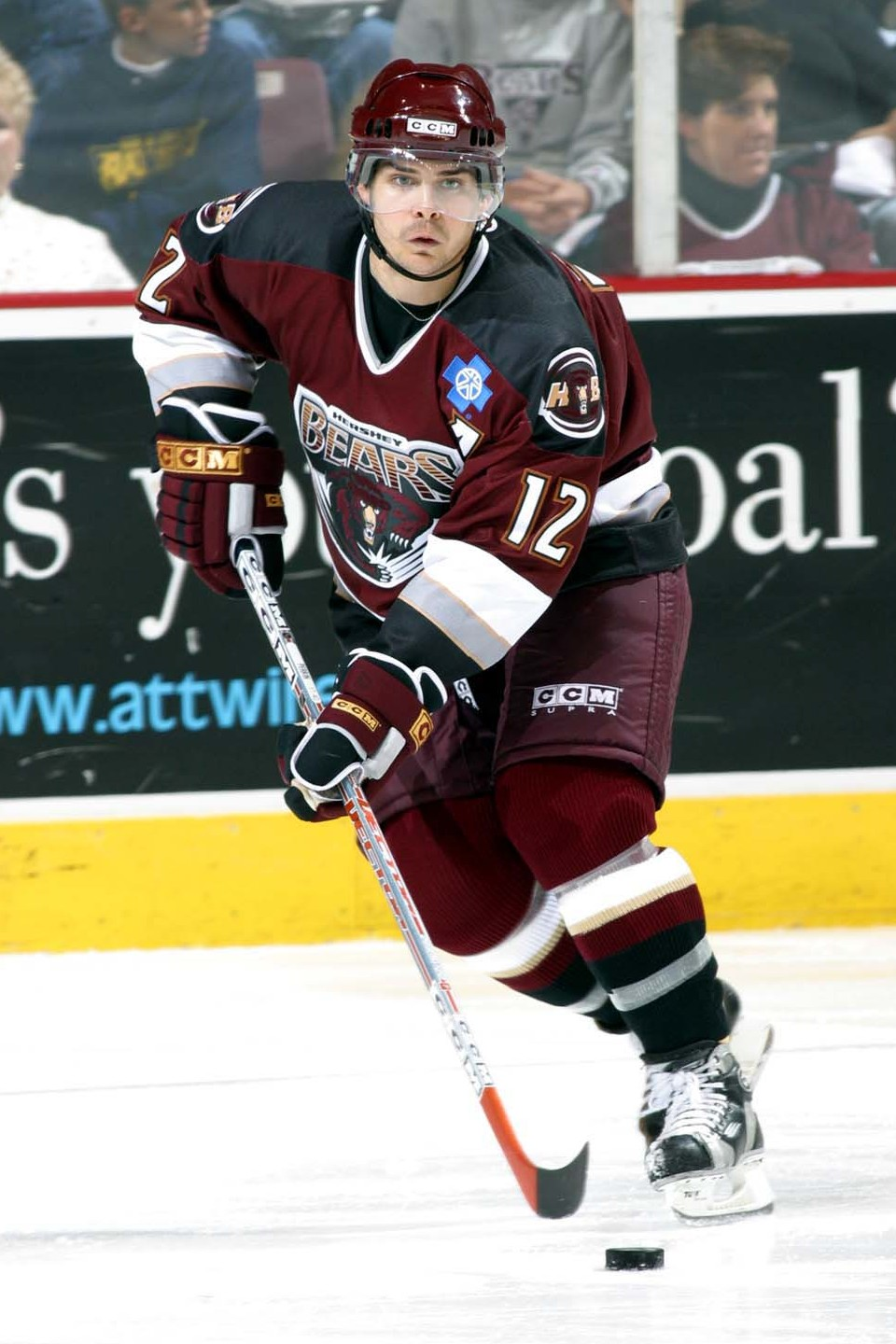
- Perrin with the Hershey Bears in 2004
- Born: November 1, 1975 (age 51) Laval, Quebec, Canada
- Height: 5 ft 09 in (175 cm)
- Weight: 184 lb (83 kg; 13 st 2 lb)
- Position: Centre
- Shot: Left
- Played for: Jokerit; Ässät; HPK; Tampa Bay Lightning; EHC Biel; Atlanta Thrashers; Avangard Omsk; HC TPS; JYP Jyväskylä
- NHL draft: Undrafted
- Playing career: 1997–2019

Éric Perrin (born November 1, 1975) is a Canadian professional ice hockey director and former player who last played for JYP Jyväskylä in the Finnish Liiga. As of December 2017, he is the highest scoring foreign player in the history of Liiga.

== Playing career ==
As a youth, Perrin played in the 1988 Quebec International Pee-Wee Hockey Tournament with a minor ice hockey team from Laval, Quebec.

Perrin played college hockey at the University of Vermont, where he played with future Tampa Bay Lightning team mate Martin St. Louis and Boston Bruins goaltender Tim Thomas. and went undrafted by the NHL. After spending several years playing minor league hockey, including a stint in Finland, Perrin was playing for the Hershey Bears when he was called up by the Lightning with 4 games left in the 2003–04 NHL season. He registered one assist in the playoffs on the way to the Lightning winning the Stanley Cup. Perrin is best friend of Lightning winger Martin St. Louis.

During the 2004–05 NHL lock-out, Perrin re-signed with the AHL Hershey Bears, where he was named the team's MVP, as well as the Man of the Year for his charitable contributions. The next season, rather than re-sign with the Bears, he elected to go back overseas, and signed with Swiss team SC Bern. During the Playoffs in the Swiss Nationalliga B he played with the EHC Biel. Once the Swiss season ended, he re-signed with the Tampa Bay Lightning, and on November 2, 2006, he scored his first NHL goal against the Philadelphia Flyers into an empty net in a 5-2 Lightning victory.

Perrin signed with the Atlanta Thrashers on July 1, 2007. In the 2007–08 NHL season with the Thrashers, he recorded career highs in assists (33) and points (45). He last played for the Atlanta Thrashers of the National Hockey League and he joined Avangard Omsk of the KHL on September 3, 2009. Perrin was cut from his try-out with the Tampa Bay Lightning on October 5, 2010. In his NHL career he recorded 32 goals and 104 points in 245 games with the Tampa Bay Lightning and Atlanta Thrashers. He was also a member of the 2004 Stanley Cup winning Tampa Bay Lightning.

In October 2010 he signed a two-year deal to return with JYP of the SM-liiga.

On February 23, 2015, Perrin announced that JYP and he had come to a mutual agreement in which Perrin would leave JYP at the end of the 2014-15 Liiga season. On April 21, 2015, HC TPS announced they had signed Perrin as a free agent to a multi-year contract.

Prior to the 2018–19 season, Perrin continued his longevity in returning to former club, JYP Jyväskylä, on a one-year contract on June 11, 2018. On March 19 JYP lost on the first round of Liiga playoffs and Perrin retired.

After retiring as a player, he became Director of Hockey Operations for the youth travel hockey club DME Swamp Rabbits out of the Daytona Ice Arena in Daytona Beach, FL.

== Career statistics ==
			Regular season					Playoffs
Season	Team	League	GP	G	A	Pts	PIM	GP	G	A	Pts	PIM
1991–92	Laval Régents	QMAAA	42	41	50	91	—	12	7	16	23
1992–93	Hawkesbury Hawks	CJHL	31	34	58	92	48	—	—	—	—	—
1993–94	University of Vermont	ECAC	32	24	21	45	34	—	—	—	—	—
1994–95	University of Vermont	ECAC	35	28	39	67	38	—	—	—	—	—
1995–96	University of Vermont	ECAC	38	29	56	85	38	—	—	—	—	—
1996–97	University of Vermont	ECAC	26	26	33	59	40	—	—	—	—	—
1997–98	Cleveland Lumberjacks	IHL	69	12	31	43	34	—	—	—	—	—
1997–98	Québec Rafales	IHL	13	2	12	14	4	—	—	—	—	—
1998–99	Kansas City Blades	IHL	82	24	37	61	71	3	0	0	0	0
1999–00	Kansas City Blades	IHL	21	3	15	18	16	—	—	—	—	—
2000–01	Jokerit	SM-l	6	1	1	2	2	—	—	—	—	—
2000–01	Ässät	SM-l	43	15	23	38	70	—	—	—	—	—
2001–02	Ässät	SM-l	45	13	13	26	16	—	—	—	—	—
2001–02	HPK	SM-l	12	5	10	15	4	8	2	4	6	6
2002–03	JYP	SM-l	56	18	28	46	36	7	4	6	10	8
2003–04	Hershey Bears	AHL	71	21	54	75	49	—	—	—	—	—
2003–04	Tampa Bay Lightning	NHL	4	0	0	0	0	12	0	1	1	6
2004–05	Hershey Bears	AHL	80	24	49	73	46	—	—	—	—	—
2005–06	SC Bern	NLA	44	13	25	38	28	6	2	4	6	8
2005–06	EHC Biel	NLB	—	—	—	—	—	11	5	7	12	2
2006–07	Tampa Bay Lightning	NHL	82	13	23	36	30	6	1	1	2	2
2007–08	Atlanta Thrashers	NHL	81	12	33	45	26	—	—	—	—	—
2008–09	Atlanta Thrashers	NHL	78	7	16	23	36	—	—	—	—	—
2009–10	Avangard Omsk	KHL	55	7	12	19	36	3	1	0	1	16
2010–11	JYP	SM-l	50	18	32	50	47	10	4	3	7	6
2011–12	JYP	SM-l	58	19	40	59	20	14	4	10	14	6
2012–13	JYP	SM-l	59	11	42	53	22	11	1	5	6	2
2013–14	JYP	Liiga	60	16	30	46	28	7	1	3	4	4
2014–15	JYP	Liiga	59	12	43	55	20	12	3	8	11	6
2015–16	TPS	Liiga	46	10	24	34	4	8	2	2	4	4
2016–17	TPS	Liiga	43	13	18	31	18	6	0	2	2	0
2017–18	TPS	Liiga	50	23	20	43	22	10	6	3	9	4
2018–19	JYP	Liiga	56	15	19	34	18	3	1	1	2	0
Liiga totals			643	189	343	532	327	96	28	47	74	46
NHL totals			245	32	72	104	92	18	1	2	3	8
KHL totals			55	7	12	19	36	3	1	0	1	16

== Awards and honours ==
Award	Year
College
All-ECAC Hockey Rookie Team	1993–94
All-ECAC Hockey First Team	1994–95, 1995–96
AHCA East First-Team All-American	1995–96
All-ECAC Hockey Second Team	1996–97
AHL
First All-Star Team	2003–04
NHL
Stanley Cup (Tampa Bay)	2003–04
Dan Snyder Memorial Award	2007–08
Liiga
(gold) Kanada-malja (JYP)	2011–12
(bronze) Bronze Medal	2001–02, 2012–13, 2014–15
European Trophy
(gold) Champion (JYP)	2013

Awards and achievements
Preceded by Burke Murphy	ECAC Hockey Rookie of the Year; 1993–94	Succeeded by Paul DiFrancesco
Preceded by Martin St. Louis	ECAC Hockey Player of the Year; 1995–96	Succeeded by Todd White
Preceded by Brendan Morrison	NCAA Ice Hockey Scoring Champion; 1995–96 (with Martin St. Louis)	Succeeded by Brendan Morrison
