= Tom Draper =

Canadian ice hockey player

- Born: November 20, 1966 (age 59) Outremont, Quebec, Canada
- Height: 5 ft 11 in (180 cm)
- Weight: 185 lb (84 kg; 13 st 3 lb)
- Position: Goaltender
- Caught: Left
- Played for: Winnipeg Jets; Buffalo Sabres; New York Islanders
- NHL draft: 165th overall, 1985; Winnipeg Jets
- Playing career: 1987–2004

Thomas Edward Draper (born November 20, 1966) is a Canadian former professional ice hockey goaltender. He was chosen in the eighth round, 165th overall, the 8th pick of the Winnipeg Jets in the 1985 NHL entry draft.

== Playing career ==
Draper was born in Outremont, Quebec. As a youth, he played in the 1978 and 1979 Quebec International Pee-Wee Hockey Tournament with a minor ice hockey team from Verdun, Quebec.

Draper played collegiately at the University of Vermont and, after college, played one season in Finland with Tappara of the SM-liiga. He made his North American professional debut with the AHL's Moncton Hawks in the 1988–89 season, and also appeared in two NHL games with the Winnipeg Jets that same season.

On February 28, 1991, the Jets traded Draper to the St. Louis Blues for future considerations, which on May 24, 1991 turned out to be for Jim Vesey; Draper was ultimately traded back to the Jets. On June 22, 1991 the Buffalo Sabres acquired him from the Jets for the seventh round draft pick in the 1992 entry draft. On September 30, 1993 the Sabres traded Draper to the New York Islanders for a seventh round draft pick, Steve Plouffe in the 1994 entry draft. He then became a free agent and the Winnipeg Jets picked him up again on December 14, 1995.

In his NHL career, Draper played with the Jets, Buffalo Sabres, and New York Islanders. He ended up playing 53 professional games in the NHL. He also spent several seasons in both the AHL and the IHL. In the 1998–99 AHL season, with the Rochester Americans, Draper shared the Hap Holmes Memorial Award (lowest team goals against average) with teammate Martin Biron. Draper had a career goals against average of 3.70 and 19 wins in the NHL. After his NHL career Draper went back to Finland and became a top netminder playing for the Espoo Blues and Lukko Rauma, gaining a record of 27-17-7.

== Career statistics ==
=== Regular season and playoffs ===
| | | | Regular season | | | | | | | | | Playoffs |
| Season | Team | League | GP | W | L | T | MIN | GA | SO | GAA | SV% | GP | W | L | MIN | GA | SO | GAA | SV% |
|---|---|---|---|---|---|---|---|---|---|---|---|---|---|---|---|---|---|---|---|
| 1981–82 | Lac St-Louis Lions | QMAAA | 25 | 17 | 4 | 4 | 1498 | 85 | 0 | 3.40 | — | 7 | 2 | 5 | 429 | 28 | 0 | 3.92 | — |
| 1982–83 | Lac St-Louis Lions | QMAAA | 28 | 15 | 8 | 5 | 1677 | 149 | 0 | 5.34 | — | 7 | 4 | 3 | 400 | 30 | 0 | 4.50 | — |
| 1983–84 | University of Vermont | ECAC | 20 | 8 | 12 | 0 | 1205 | 82 | 0 | 4.08 | .879 | — | — | — | — | — | — | — | — |
| 1984–85 | University of Vermont | ECAC | 24 | 5 | 17 | 0 | 11316 | 90 | 0 | 4.11 | .889 | — | — | — | — | — | — | — | — |
| 1985–86 | University of Vermont | ECAC | 29 | 15 | 12 | 1 | 1697 | 87 | 1 | 3.08 | .898 | — | — | — | — | — | — | — | — |
| 1986–87 | University of Vermont | ECAC | 29 | 16 | 13 | 0 | 1662 | 96 | 2 | 3.47 | — | — | — | — | — | — | — | — | — |
| 1987–88 | Tappara | FIN | 28 | 16 | 3 | 9 | 1619 | 87 | 0 | 3.22 | .893 | 10 | 7 | 3 | 600 | 25 | 2 | 2.50 | .910 |
| 1988–89 | Winnipeg Jets | NHL | 2 | 1 | 1 | 0 | 120 | 12 | 0 | 6.00 | .818 | — | — | — | — | — | — | — | — |
| 1988–89 | Moncton Hawks | AHL | 54 | 27 | 17 | 5 | 2962 | 171 | 2 | 3.46 | .890 | 7 | 5 | 2 | 419 | 24 | 0 | 3.44 | — |
| 1989–90 | Winnipeg Jets | NHL | 6 | 2 | 4 | 0 | 359 | 26 | 0 | 4.34 | .829 | — | — | — | — | — | — | — | — |
| 1989–90 | Moncton Hawks | AHL | 51 | 20 | 24 | 3 | 2844 | 167 | 1 | 3.52 | .894 | — | — | — | — | — | — | — | — |
| 1990–91 | Moncton Hawks | AHL | 30 | 15 | 13 | 2 | 1779 | 95 | 1 | 3.20 | .899 | — | — | — | — | — | — | — | — |
| 1990–91 | Fort Wayne Komets | IHL | 410 | 5 | 3 | 1 | 564 | 32 | 0 | 3.40 | — | — | — | — | — | — | — | — | — |
| 1990–91 | Peoria Rivermen | IHL | 10 | 6 | 3 | 1 | 584 | 36 | 0 | 3.70 | — | 4 | 2 | 1 | 214 | 10 | 0 | 2.80 | — |
| 1991–92 | Buffalo Sabres | NHL | 26 | 10 | 9 | 5 | 1403 | 75 | 1 | 3.21 | .895 | 7 | 3 | 4 | 433 | 19 | 1 | 2.63 | .905 |
| 1991–92 | Rochester Americans | AHL | 9 | 4 | 3 | 2 | 531 | 28 | 0 | 3.16 | .884 | — | — | — | — | — | — | — | — |
| 1992–93 | Buffalo Sabres | NHL | 11 | 5 | 6 | 0 | 664 | 41 | 0 | 3.71 | .881 | — | — | — | — | — | — | — | — |
| 1992–93 | Rochester Americans | AHL | 5 | 3 | 2 | 0 | 303 | 22 | 0 | 4.36 | .864 | — | — | — | — | — | — | — | — |
| 1993–94 | New York Islanders | NHL | 7 | 1 | 3 | 0 | 227 | 16 | 0 | 4.23 | .864 | — | — | — | — | — | — | — | — |
| 1993–94 | Salt Lake Golden Eagles | IHL | 35 | 7 | 23 | 3 | 1933 | 140 | 0 | 4.34 | .875 | — | — | — | — | — | — | — | — |
| 1994–95 | Minnesota Moose | IHL | 59 | 25 | 20 | 6 | 3063 | 187 | 1 | 3.66 | .881 | 2 | 0 | 2 | 118 | 10 | 0 | 5.07 | .865 |
| 1995–96 | Winnipeg Jets | NHL | 1 | 0 | 0 | 0 | 34 | 3 | 0 | 5.37 | .786 | — | — | — | — | — | — | — | — |
| 1995–96 | Milwaukee Admirals | IHL | 31 | 14 | 12 | 3 | 1793 | 101 | 1 | 3.38 | .892 | — | — | — | — | — | — | — | — |
| 1996–97 | Long Beach Ice Dogs | IHL | 39 | 28 | 7 | 3 | 2267 | 87 | 2 | 2.30 | .909 | 18 | 13 | 5 | 1096 | 41 | 2 | 2.24 | .923 |
| 1997–98 | Quebec Rafales | IHL | 43 | 15 | 22 | 4 | 2418 | 131 | 2 | 3.25 | .887 | — | — | — | — | — | — | — | — |
| 1997–98 | Cleveland Lumberjacks | IHL | 9 | 4 | 2 | 2 | 497 | 20 | 0 | 2.41 | .922 | 10 | 5 | 5 | 582 | 32 | 0 | 3.30 | .905 |
| 1998–99 | Rochester Americans | AHL | 26 | 14 | 9 | 3 | 1568 | 60 | 0 | 2.30 | .924 | 2 | 0 | 0 | 86 | 4 | 0 | 2.79 | .895 |
| 1999–00 | Lukko | FIN | 52 | 27 | 17 | 7 | 3143 | 116 | 6 | 2.21 | .915 | 4 | 1 | 3 | 273 | 7 | 1 | 1.54 | .956 |
| 2000–01 | Espoo Blues | FIN | 35 | 13 | 15 | 6 | 2033 | 85 | 4 | 2.51 | .901 | — | — | — | — | — | — | — | — |
| 2001–02 | Tappara | FIN | 50 | 29 | 13 | 8 | 3025 | 102 | 9 | 2.02 | .919 | 10 | 7 | 3 | 617 | 18 | 0 | 1.75 | .936 |
| 2002–03 | HIFK | FIN | 7 | 2 | 2 | 2 | 374 | 24 | 0 | 3.85 | .879 | — | — | — | — | — | — | — | — |
| 2002–03 | Adirondack IceHawks | UHL | 5 | 3 | 1 | 0 | 244 | 13 | 1 | 3.12 | .888 | — | — | — | — | — | — | — | — |
| 2002–03 | Toledo Storm | ECHL | 4 | 3 | 1 | 0 | 250 | 7 | 0 | 1.72 | .938 | — | — | — | — | — | — | — | — |
| 2002–03 | Augusta Lynx | ECHL | 17 | 6 | 5 | 2 | 864 | 43 | 1 | 2.99 | .892 | — | — | — | — | — | — | — | — |
| 2003–04 | Adirondack IceHawks | UHL | 1 | 1 | 0 | 0 | 60 | 5 | 0 | 5.00 | .773 | — | — | — | — | — | — | — | — |
| NHL totals | | | 52 | 19 | 23 | 5 | 2807 | 173 | 1 | 3.70 | .877 | 7 | 3 | 4 | 433 | 19 | 1 | 2.63 | .905 |

== Awards and honors ==
| Award | Year |
|---|---|
| All-ECAC Hockey First Team | 1985–86 |

- Hap Holmes Memorial Award (lowest GAA in AHL): 1998–99
- In the 1985–86 and the 1986-87 seasons Draper was named to East Coast Athletic Conference All-Star First Team.
- AHL Second All-Star Team, 1988-1989

Awards and achievements
| Preceded by Jean-Sebastien Giguere and Tyler Moss | Winner of the Hap Holmes Memorial Award (with Martin Biron); 1998–1999 | Succeeded by Milan Hnilicka and Jean-Francois Labbe |
