= 2006–07 Vermont Catamounts women's ice hockey season =

- Conference: Hockey East
- Home ice: Gutterson Fieldhouse

Rankings
- USA Today/USA Hockey Magazine: Not ranked
- USCHO.com/CBS College Sports: Not ranked

Record
- Overall: 3-27-2

Coaches and captains
- Head coach: Tim Bothwell

The 2006–07 Vermont Catamounts season was their second in Hockey East. Led by new head coach Tim Bothwell, the Catamounts had 3 victories, compared to 27 defeats and 2 ties. Their conference record was 1 victory, 19 defeats and 1 tie.

== Regular season ==
=== Schedule ===
Date	Opponent	Score	Result
Sep. 29	at Clarkson	9-0	L
Sep. 30	at Clarkson	4-1	L
Oct. 6	at Connecticut*	8-2	L
Oct. 7	at Connecticut*	3-0	L
Oct. 21	at Boston Univ.*	3-0	L
Oct. 22	at Boston Univ.*	4-0	L
Oct. 27	SACRED HEART*	6-2	W
Oct. 28	SACRED HEART*	3-2	W
Nov. 3	ST. CLOUD ST.	7-0	L
Nov. 4	ST. CLOUD ST.	6-0	L
Nov. 11	NORTHEASTERN*	3-3	T
Nov. 12	BOSTON UNIV.*	3-0	L
Nov. 18	ROBERT MORRIS*	2-0	L
Nov. 24	BEMIDJI STATE	3-3	T
Nov. 25	BEMIDJI STATE	3-0	L
Dec. 2	at New Hampshire*	5-0	L
Dec. 30	at Minnesota St.	4-0	L
Dec. 31	at Minnesota St.	7-1	L
Jan. 4	CONNECTICUT*	3-2	W
Jan. 6	PROVIDENCE*	7-0	L
Jan. 12	BOSTON COLLEGE*	7-0	L
Jan. 13	BOSTON COLLEGE*	5-0	L
Jan. 20	at Maine*	3-0	L
Jan. 27	at Boston College*	4-1	L
Feb. 3	at Providence*	5-1	L
Feb. 4	at Providence*	10-1	L
Feb. 10	MAINE*	3-1	L
Feb. 11	MAINE*	4-2	L
Feb. 17	at Northeastern*	4-1	L
Feb. 18	at Northeastern*	2-1	L
Feb. 24	NEW HAMPSHIRE*	4-0	L
Feb. 25	NEW HAMPSHIRE*	8-1	L

== Awards and honors ==
=== Hockey East All-Academic Team ===
Year	Player
2007	Samantha Martin
2007	Jessica Murphy
2007	Korrie Peckham
2007	Karen Sentoff
2007	Jackie
2007	Frankie Williams
2007	Gabe Worzella
