= Dave Reece =

American ice hockey player

- Born: September 13, 1948 (age 77) Troy, NY, USA
- Height: 6 ft 1 in (185 cm)
- Weight: 194 lb (88 kg; 13 st 12 lb)
- Position: Goaltender
- Caught: Left
- Played for: Boston Bruins
- National team: United States
- NHL draft: Undrafted
- Playing career: 1972–1977

David Barrett Reece (born September 13, 1948 in Troy, New York) is a retired American professional ice hockey goaltender who played the 1975–76 season with the Boston Bruins. He posted an NHL record of seven wins, five losses and two ties, with two shutouts and a 3.32 goals against average.

== Playing career ==
Reece is known best for surrendering eleven goals against the Toronto Maple Leafs on February 7, 1976, which included six goals and four assists for Darryl Sittler, setting an NHL-record ten points in one game. He was in net as a replacement for starters Gerry Cheevers and Gilles Gilbert. Reece played the whole game and was never pulled by coach Don Cherry. The game was Reece's last NHL appearance.

In international hockey, Reece served as Mike Curran's backup at the 1977 Ice Hockey World Championship tournament in Vienna. He also was a member of the preliminary U.S. Olympic roster for the 1972 Winter Olympics but did not make the final cut.

A four-year collegiate hockey player on the University of Vermont men's hockey team, Reece is 7th all-time in save percentage (.900) and goals against average (3.01), while also ranking 5th in all-time saves. He has been named a member of the Vermont Hockey All-Time Team. During his time at UVM, Reece double majored in political science and education.

== Post-playing career ==
Reece was also a player agent for Western Professional Hockey League enforcer and track star David Watson and many other minor league players.

Reece went on to live in Wilder, Vermont, for a number of years, working as a skating instructor and educational consultant, and later lived in Greenville, South Carolina.

== Career statistics ==
=== Regular season and playoffs ===
			Regular season									Playoffs
Season	Team	League	GP	W	L	T	MIN	GA	SO	GAA	SV%	GP	W	L	MIN	GA	SO	GAA	SV%
1968–69	University of Vermont	ECAC 2	25	13	12	0	1500	84	3	3.36	—	—	—	—	—	—	—	—	—
1969–70	University of Vermont	ECAC 2	24	16	8	0	1440	65	4	2.71	—	—	—	—	—	—	—	—	—
1970–71	University of Vermont	ECAC 2	26	17	9	0	1560	75	3	2.88	—	—	—	—	—	—	—	—	—
1972–73	Boston Braves	AHL	41	—	—	—	2183	112	3	3.07	—	—	—	—	—	—	—	—	—
1973–74	Boston Braves	AHL	57	18	28	11	3241	189	1	3.49	—	—	—	—	—	—	—	—	—
1974–75	Rochester Americans	AHL	42	19	16	7	2478	121	1	2.92	.909	11	6	5	680	34	0	3.00	—
1975–76	Boston Bruins	NHL	14	7	5	2	776	43	2	3.32	.877	—	—	—	—	—	—	—	—
1975–76	Springfield Indians	AHL	20	13	7	0	1202	78	0	3.89	—	—	—	—	—	—	—	—	—
1976–77	Rochester Americans	AHL	32	15	14	3	1891	111	1	3.52	.872	—	—	—	—	—	—	—	—
1976–77	Rhode Island Reds	AHL	11	2	7	1	634	51	0	4.82	.878	—	—	—	—	—	—	—	—
NHL totals			14	7	5	2	776	43	2	3.32	.877	—	—	—	—	—	—	—	—

=== International ===
Year	Team	Event	GP	W	L	T	MIN	GA	SO	GAA	SV%
1977	United States	WC	5	—	—	—	299	16	0	3.21	—
Senior totals			5	—	—	—	299	16	0	3.21	—
