= Tim O'Connell =

American ice hockey player (born 1953)

- Born: October 26, 1953 (age 72) Chicago, Illinois, U.S.
- Height: 5 ft 10 in (178 cm)
- Weight: 165 lb (75 kg; 11 st 11 lb)
- Position: Right wing Defense
- Played for: San Diego Mariners (WHA)
- NHL draft: 124th overall, 1973; Buffalo Sabres
- Playing career: 1976–1977

Tim O'Connell (born October 26, 1953) is an American former professional ice hockey player. He was drafted by the Buffalo Sabres of the National Hockey League in the eighth round, 124th overall, of the 1973 NHL Entry Draft; however, he never played in that league. He played 16 games in the World Hockey Association with the San Diego Mariners in the 1976–77 season. O'Connell was born in Chicago, Illinois, but grew up in Cohasset, Massachusetts.

A standout hockey player for the University of Vermont Catamounts from 1972–76, O'Connell ranks third all-time in points 234. He is second all-time in goals scored (99), and third in assists (135).

O'Connell's brother Mike played in the NHL with the Chicago Black Hawks, Detroit Red Wings and Boston Bruins. His father, Tommy, played in the National Football League with the Chicago Bears and Cleveland Browns, as well as in the American Football League with the Buffalo Bills.

== Awards and honors ==
| Award | Year |
|---|---|
| All-ECAC Hockey First Team | 1974–75 |
| AHCA East All-American | 1974–75 |

== Career statistics ==
=== Regular season and playoffs ===
| | | | Regular season | | | | | Playoffs |
| Season | Team | League | GP | G | A | Pts | PIM | GP | G | A | Pts | PIM |
|---|---|---|---|---|---|---|---|---|---|---|---|---|
| 1970–71 | St. Michael's Buzzers | MJBHL | Statistics Unavailable |
| 1971–72 | St. Michael's Buzzers | MJBHL | Statistics Unavailable |
| 1972–73 | University of Vermont | ECAC-2 | 31 | 21 | 30 | 51 | 37 | — | — | — | — | — |
| 1973–74 | University of Vermont | ECAC-2 | 33 | 24 | 33 | 57 | 25 | — | — | — | — | — |
| 1974–75 | University of Vermont | ECAC | 36 | 41 | 41 | 82 | 26 | — | — | — | — | — |
| 1975–76 | University of Vermont | ECAC | 29 | 13 | 31 | 44 | 12 | — | — | — | — | — |
| 1976–77 | Oklahoma City Blazers | CHL | 22 | 5 | 6 | 11 | 0 | — | — | — | — | — |
| 1976–77 | Charlotte Checkers | SHL | 21 | 8 | 5 | 13 | 6 | — | — | — | — | — |
| 1976–77 | San Diego Mariners | WHA | 16 | 0 | 3 | 3 | 4 | — | — | — | — | — |
| WHA totals | | | 16 | 0 | 3 | 3 | 4 | — | — | — | — | — |
