= Jaime Sifers =

American ice hockey player

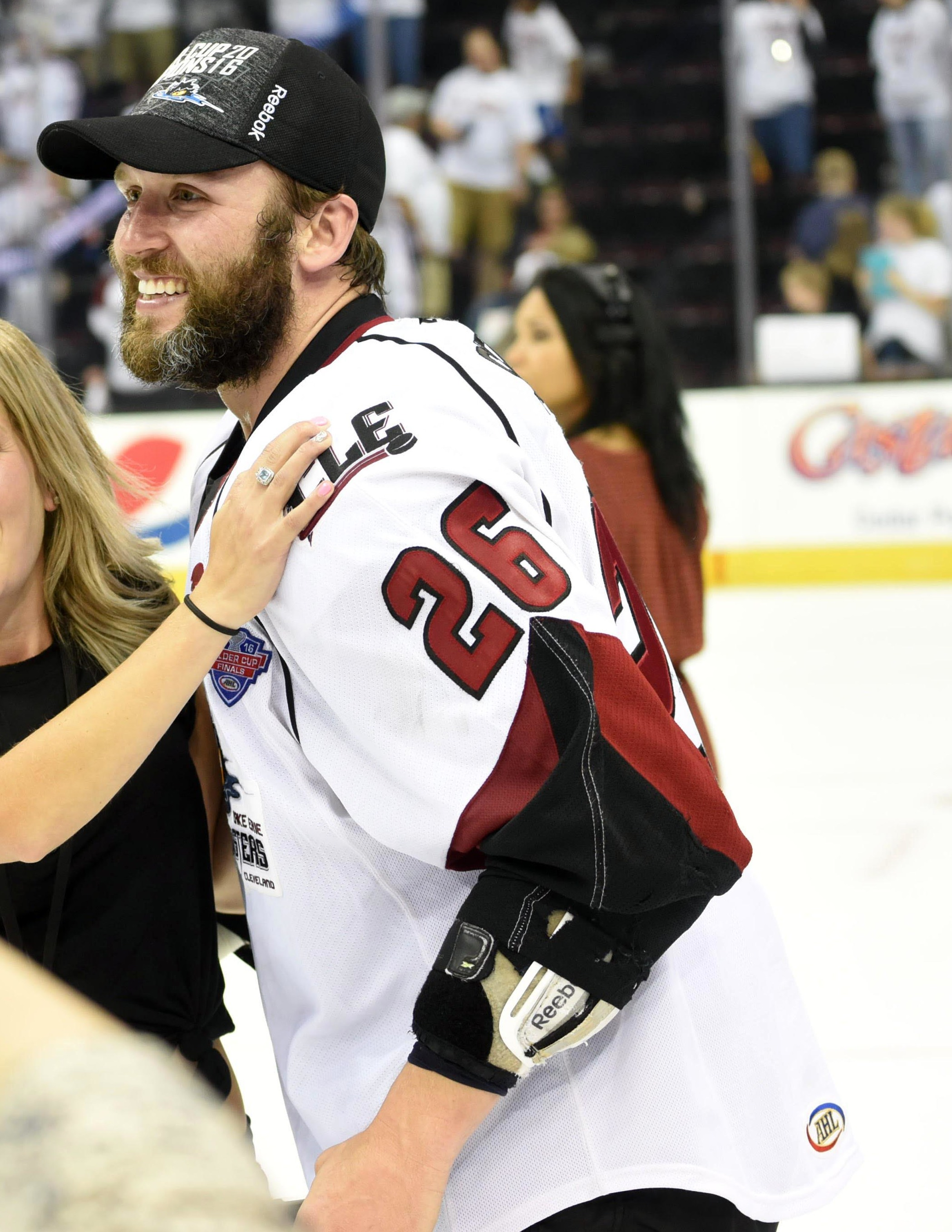
- Sifers with the Lake Erie Monsters in 2016
- Born: January 18, 1983 (age 43) Stratford, Connecticut, U.S.
- Height: 5 ft 11 in (180 cm)
- Weight: 200 lb (91 kg; 14 st 4 lb)
- Position: Defense
- Shot: Right
- Played for: Toronto Maple Leafs; Minnesota Wild; Adler Mannheim
- NHL draft: Undrafted
- Playing career: 2006–2019

James T. Sifers (born January 18, 1983) is an American former professional ice hockey defenseman who played most notably in the American Hockey League (AHL). He enjoyed brief stints in the National Hockey League (NHL) with the Toronto Maple Leafs and Minnesota Wild.

== Playing career ==
Undrafted, Sifers played collegiate hockey with the University of Vermont in the Hockey East before making his professional debut at the end of the 2005–06 season with the Toronto Marlies of the AHL.

On July 28, 2006, Sifers signed a two-year entry-level contract with the Toronto Maple Leafs. In 2008–09, his third season within the Maple Leafs organization, Sifers would make his NHL debut with the Maple Leafs, playing in 23 games while registering 2 assists.

On July 8, 2009, Sifers signed a one-year contract with the Minnesota Wild organization. After making the opening night roster for the Wild to start the 2009–10 season, Sifers played the majority of the year with AHL affiliate, the Houston Aeros. Sifers would play 14 games collectively throughout the season with the Wild.

On July 2, 2010, Sifers signed a one-year contract with the Atlanta Thrashers organization. He was assigned to their AHL affiliate, the Chicago Wolves for the entirety of the 2010–11 season.

On May 26, 2011, Sifers left the NHL and signed a one-year contract with German club, Adler Mannheim of the Deutsche Eishockey Liga.

After three seasons in Germany, Sifers opted to return to North America, signing a one-year deal as a free agent with the Springfield Falcons of the AHL on July 3, 2014. Playing with the affiliate of the Columbus Blue Jackets, Sifers appeared in every game for the Falcons on the blueline, contributing with 22 points in the 2014–15 season. On July 2, 2015, Sifers was signed by the Blue Jackets, to a two-year, two-way contract as a free agent.

Following the completion of his two-year deal with the Blue Jackets, Sifers left the Cleveland Monsters as a free agent. He agreed to continue his career in the AHL, signing a two-year deal with the Utica Comets, an affiliate to the Vancouver Canucks, on July 13, 2017.

Upon the conclusion of his contract with the Comets at the end of the 2018-19 regular season, Sifers opted to conclude his 13-year professional career, announcing his retirement on April 15, 2019.

== Career statistics ==
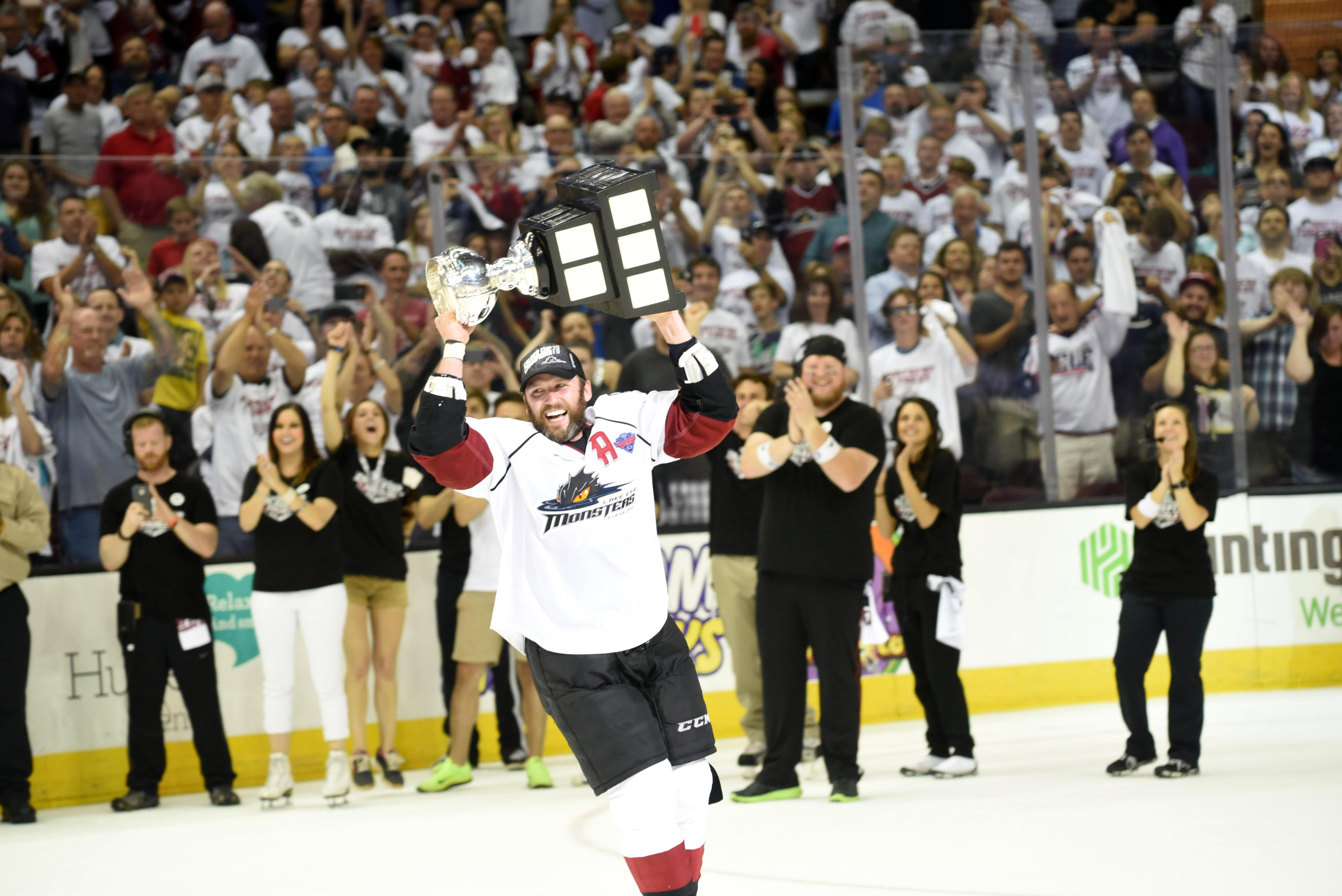
Sifers celebrating the Calder Cup victory with the Lake Erie Monsters.

			Regular season					Playoffs
Season	Team	League	GP	G	A	Pts	PIM	GP	G	A	Pts	PIM
2002–03	University of Vermont	ECAC	34	4	14	18	66	—	—	—	—	—
2003–04	University of Vermont	ECAC	35	4	14	18	93	—	—	—	—	—
2004–05	University of Vermont	ECAC	36	4	12	16	57	—	—	—	—	—
2005–06	University of Vermont	HE	38	3	15	18	60	—	—	—	—	—
2005–06	Toronto Marlies	AHL	2	0	0	0	2	—	—	—	—	—
2006–07	Toronto Marlies	AHL	80	7	18	25	75	—	—	—	—	—
2007–08	Toronto Marlies	AHL	80	3	10	13	57	19	2	3	5	6
2008–09	Toronto Marlies	AHL	43	4	16	20	47	4	0	1	1	4
2008–09	Toronto Maple Leafs	NHL	23	0	2	2	18	—	—	—	—	—
2009–10	Minnesota Wild	NHL	14	0	0	0	6	—	—	—	—	—
2009–10	Houston Aeros	AHL	54	3	5	8	58	—	—	—	—	—
2010–11	Chicago Wolves	AHL	68	4	18	22	66	—	—	—	—	—
2011–12	Adler Mannheim	DEL	52	5	19	24	59	14	0	3	3	8
2012–13	Adler Mannheim	DEL	52	1	14	15	64	6	0	1	1	2
2013–14	Adler Mannheim	DEL	50	3	21	24	62	5	0	1	1	0
2014–15	Springfield Falcons	AHL	76	3	19	22	82	—	—	—	—	—
2015–16	Lake Erie Monsters	AHL	67	5	14	19	86	14	0	5	5	10
2016–17	Cleveland Monsters	AHL	74	6	14	20	74	—	—	—	—	—
2017–18	Utica Comets	AHL	37	0	5	5	44	5	0	0	0	0
2018–19	Utica Comets	AHL	70	4	10	14	51	—	—	—	—	—
NHL totals			37	0	2	2	24	—	—	—	—	—

== Awards and honors ==
Awards	Year
College
All-ECAC Hockey Rookie Team	2002–03
All-ECAC Hockey Second Team	2004–05
AHL
Calder Cup (Lake Erie Monsters)	2016

Awards and achievements
Preceded by Scott Ford	ECAC Hockey Best Defensive Defenseman; 2004–05	Succeeded by Mike Madill
