= Andrew Allen (ice hockey) =

Canadian ice hockey goaltender coach

- Born: August 2, 1976 (age 49) Vankleek Hill, Ontario, Canada
- Height: 6 ft 4 in (193 cm)
- Weight: 210 lb (95 kg; 15 st 0 lb)
- Position: Goaltender
- Caught: Right
- Played for: AHL; Hershey Bears; Utah Grizzlies; Binghamton Senators; Providence Bruins; ECHL; Dayton Bombers; Macon Whoopee; Jackson Bandits; Trenton Titans
- NHL draft: Undrafted
- Playing career: 2001–2005

Andrew Allen (born August 2, 1976) is a Canadian ice hockey goaltender coach and pro scout. He is currently a pro scout for the Seattle Kraken. Previously, he was the goaltending coach for the Buffalo Sabres of the National Hockey League from 2015 to 2019 after serving in the same position for the Japan men's national ice hockey team from 2006 to 2011.

== Early life ==
Allen was born in Vankleek Hill, Ontario. He attended the University of Vermont, where he played four seasons (1997–2001) of NCAA college hockey with the Vermont Catamounts.

== Career ==
Allen went on to play five professional seasons in the American Hockey League and ECHL. During the 2004–05 ECHL season Allen posted a 30-11-3 record, with a 2.36 goals against average and a .916 save percentage, back-stopping the Trenton Titans to capture the 2005 Kelly Cup Championship.

From 2006 to 2011, Allen worked with the Japan men's national ice hockey team as a goaltending coach, and also served as a goaltending coach for St. Lawrence University's NCAA team from 2008 to 2011. He joined the Rockford IceHogs's coaching staff with the 2011–12 ECHL season.

Allen was hired by the Sabres as a goaltending coach in July 2015, replacing the outgoing Arturs Irbe.
