= Craig Homola =

American ice hockey player

- Born: November 29, 1958 (age 67) Eveleth, Minnesota, U.S.
- Height: 5 ft 8 in (173 cm)
- Weight: 170 lb (77 kg; 12 st 2 lb)
- Position: Center
- Shot: Left
- Played for: Vermont; Oklahoma City Stars; Nashville South Stars; Birmingham South Stars; Salt Lake Golden Eagles; Milwaukee Admirals; Dundee Rockets; Dundee Tigers
- Playing career: 1977–1989

Craig A. Homola (born November 29, 1958) is an American retired ice hockey center who was an All-American for Vermont.

== Career ==
In his sophomore year in high school, Homola was one of three centers on the Eveleth-Gilbert High School team who would go on to be stars in college hockey, the others being Dave Delich and Mark Pavelich. Homola graduated in 1977 and began attending the University of Vermont that fall. After a good freshman season, he took over as the leader on offense, pacing the Catamounts with 55 points as a sophomore. As a junior Homola gained wide recognition for his scoring prowess and he was invited to join the US national team a month before the 1980 Winter Olympics but he turned down the offer and watched as his former teammate Pavelich went on to win a gold medal. That season Homola was named as an All-American and ECAC Player of the Year while helping the Catamounts capture the ECAC West Division.

After graduating in 1981, Homola signed on with the Minnesota North Stars minor league system and played well. Unfortunately, short players were not in high demand for NHL teams. He bounced around in the Minnesota and Chicago Blackhawks organizations for a few years before heading to Scotland in 1986. In his first season with the Dundee Rockets, Homola produced astounding numbers, scoring 167 points in just 34 games (nearly 5 points per game), contributing on more than half of the team's goals that season. Dundee folded after the year but Homola stayed in the city when the Rockets were replaced by the Dundee Tigers. Homola was again the focus of the offense but didn't continue his torrid pace for much longer. After 7 games the following year, Homola retired for the game and returned home, eventually becoming a coach at his old high school.

Homola was inducted into the Vermont Athletic Hall of Fame in 1991.

== Statistics ==
=== Regular season and playoffs ===
| | | | Regular Season | | | | | Playoffs |
| Season | Team | League | GP | G | A | Pts | PIM | GP | G | A | Pts | PIM |
|---|---|---|---|---|---|---|---|---|---|---|---|---|
| 1974–75 | Eveleth-Gilbert High School | MN-HS | — | — | — | — | — | — | — | — | — | — |
| 1975–76 | Eveleth-Gilbert High School | MN-HS | — | — | — | — | — | — | — | — | — | — |
| 1976–77 | Eveleth-Gilbert High School | MN-HS | — | — | — | — | — | — | — | — | — | — |
| 1977–78 | Vermont | ECAC Hockey | 31 | 17 | 18 | 35 | 14 | — | — | — | — | — |
| 1978–79 | Vermont | ECAC Hockey | 30 | 24 | 31 | 55 | 39 | — | — | — | — | — |
| 1979–80 | Vermont | ECAC Hockey | 34 | 28 | 41 | 69 | 18 | — | — | — | — | — |
| 1980–81 | Vermont | ECAC Hockey | 33 | 19 | 27 | 46 | 44 | — | — | — | — | — |
| 1980–81 | Oklahoma City Stars | CHL | 5 | 2 | 2 | 4 | 0 | — | — | — | — | — |
| 1981–82 | Nashville South Stars | CHL | 76 | 19 | 35 | 54 | 47 | 3 | 0 | 0 | 0 | 2 |
| 1982–83 | Birmingham South Stars | CHL | 80 | 30 | 44 | 74 | 34 | 13 | 3 | 9 | 12 | 8 |
| 1983–84 | Salt Lake Golden Eagles | CHL | 68 | 29 | 27 | 56 | 37 | 5 | 0 | 2 | 2 | 0 |
| 1984–85 | Milwaukee Admirals | IHL | 56 | 16 | 32 | 48 | 18 | — | — | — | — | — |
| 1985–86 | Milwaukee Admirals | IHL | 12 | 2 | 2 | 4 | 2 | — | — | — | — | — |
| 1986–87 | Dundee Rockets | BHL | 34 | 73 | 94 | 167 | 27 | 5 | 14 | 9 | 23 | 2 |
| 1987–88 | Dundee Tigers | BHL | 29 | 75 | 61 | 136 | 42 | — | — | — | — | — |
| 1988–89 | Tayside Tigers | BHL | 7 | 8 | 10 | 18 | 12 | — | — | — | — | — |
| NCAA totals | | | 128 | 88 | 117 | 205 | 115 | — | — | — | — | — |
| CHL totals | | | 229 | 80 | 108 | 188 | 118 | 21 | 3 | 11 | 14 | 10 |
| IHL totals | | | 68 | 18 | 34 | 52 | 20 | — | — | — | — | — |
| BHL totals | | | 70 | 156 | 165 | 321 | 81 | 5 | 14 | 9 | 23 | 2 |

== Awards and honors ==
| Award | Year |
|---|---|
| All-ECAC Hockey First Team | 1979–80 |
| AHCA East All-American | 1979–80 |

Awards and achievements
| Preceded by Ralph Cox | ECAC Hockey Player of the Year; 1979–80 | Succeeded by Ed Small |
