= Louis Côté (ice hockey) =

Canadian ice hockey player

- Born: December 16, 1956 (age 69) Montreal, Quebec, Canada
- Height: 5 ft 10 in (178 cm)
- Weight: 181 lb (82 kg; 12 st 13 lb)
- Position: Defenseman/Right Wing
- Shot: Left
- Played for: Vermont; Carolina Thunderbirds; Chamonix HC; Dundee Rockets; Ours de Villard-de-Lans; Gothiques d'Amiens
- National team: France
- Playing career: 1976–1991

Louis Côté is a Canadian retired ice hockey defenseman and right wing who was a two-time All-American for Vermont.

== Career ==
Cote was a star defenseman for Vermont in the 1970. He was one of the first big recruits for the program after it moved up to Division I in 1974–75. In each of his four years with the Catamounts Cote was better than a point-per game player and helped the Catamounts transition into becoming a viable team at the top level of college hockey. Cote was named as an All-American for his junior and senior season despite missing 10 games in his final campaign. He left Vermont as the programs all-time leader in scoring by a defenseman and continued to hold that position as of 2021.

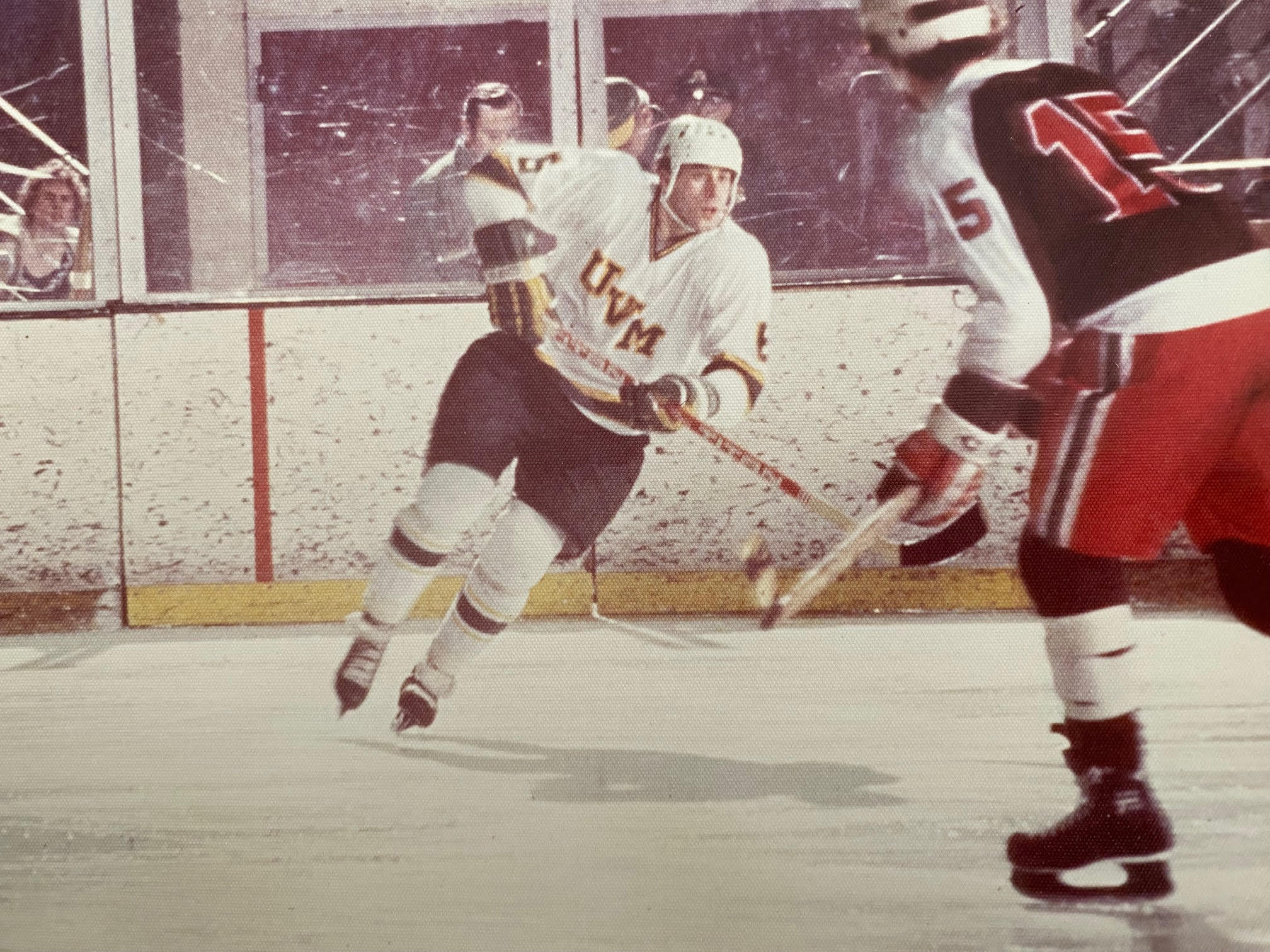

After graduation, Cote continued his playing career. He appeared briefly for the Carolina Thunderbirds in 1980 before heading to Japan.

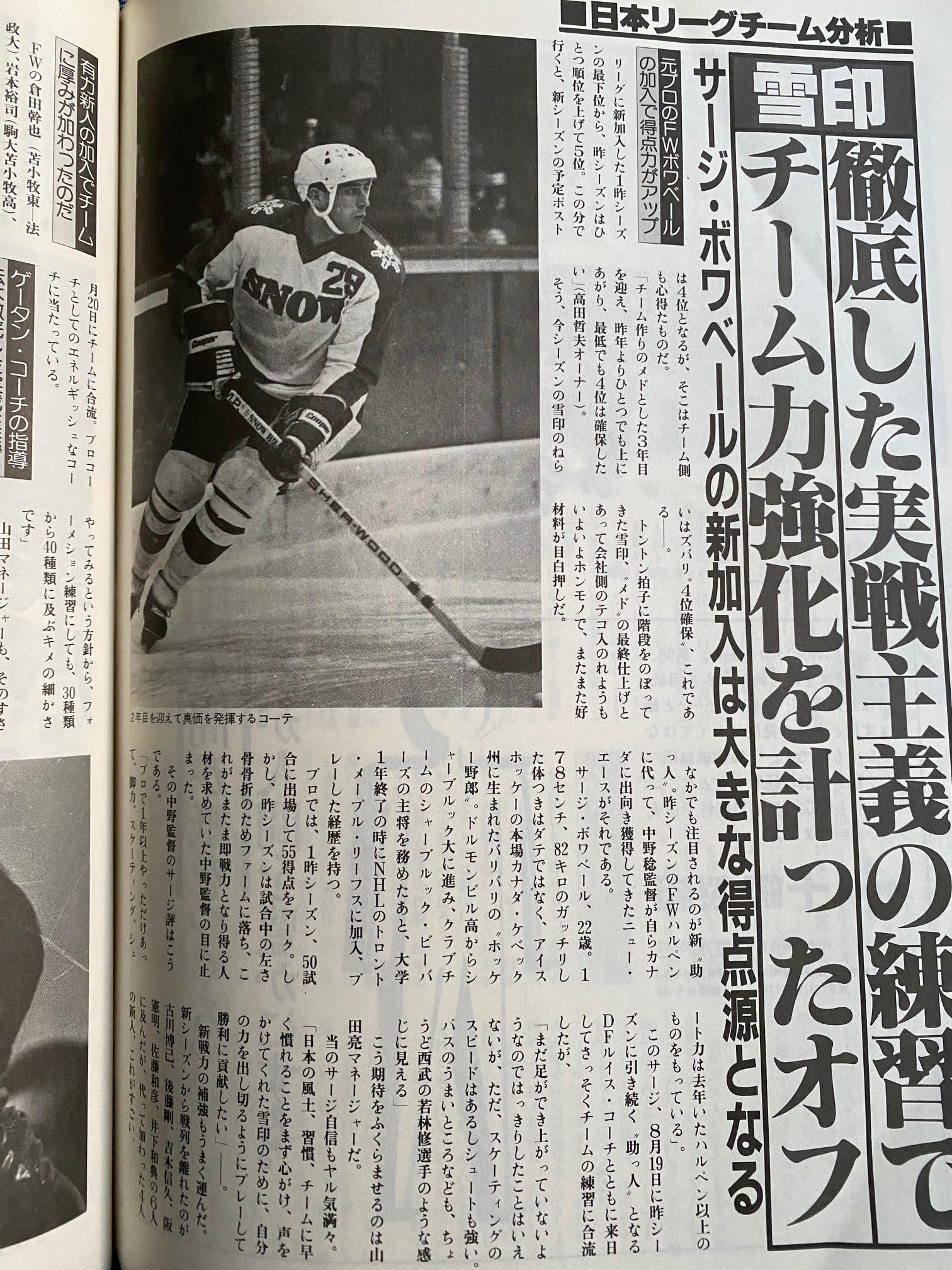

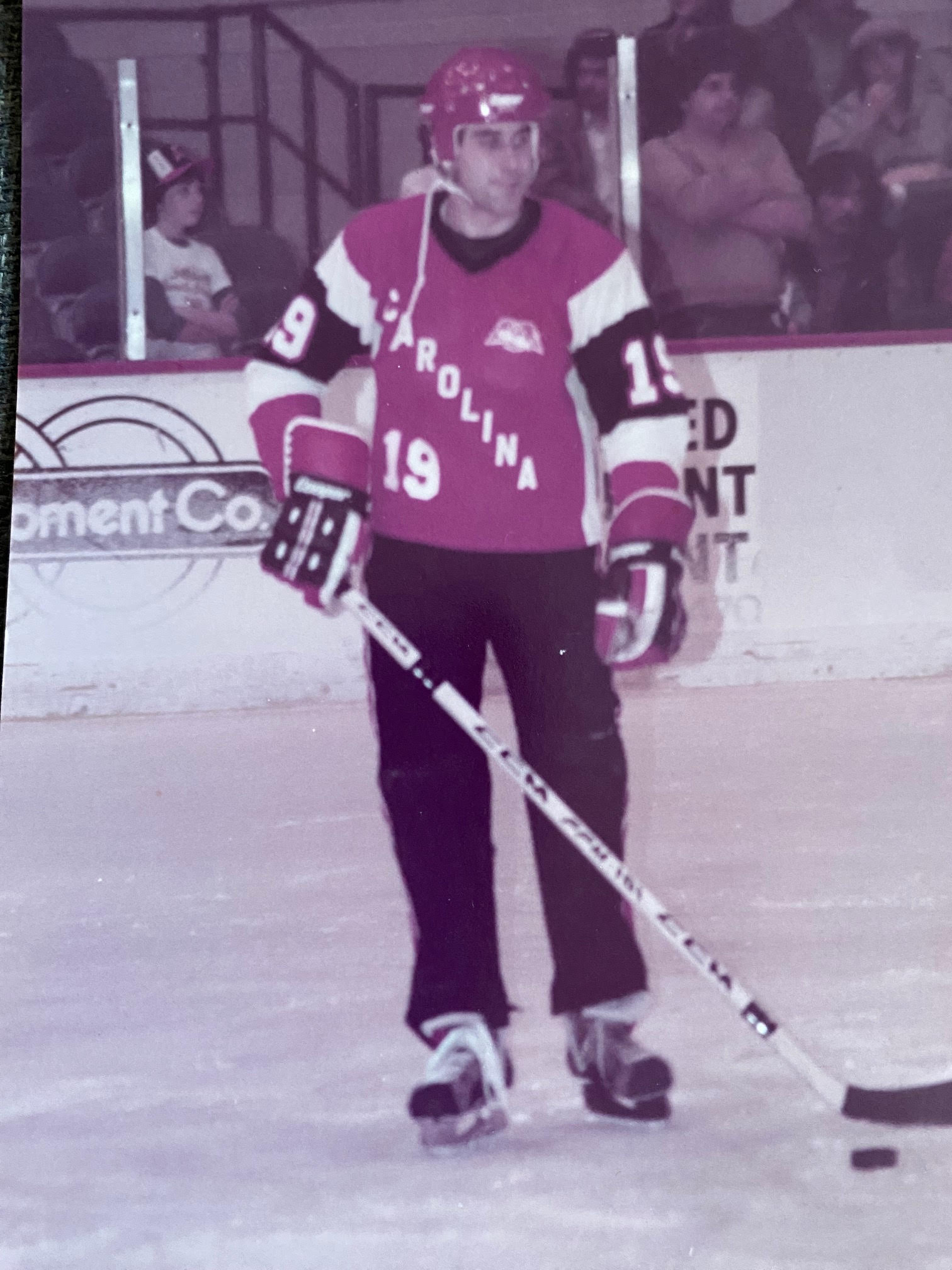

He played three years for Sapporo and then signed on with Chamonix HC, playing hockey on his third continent. He left France for a season to play with the Dundee Rockets but quickly returned and eventually joined the French National Team.

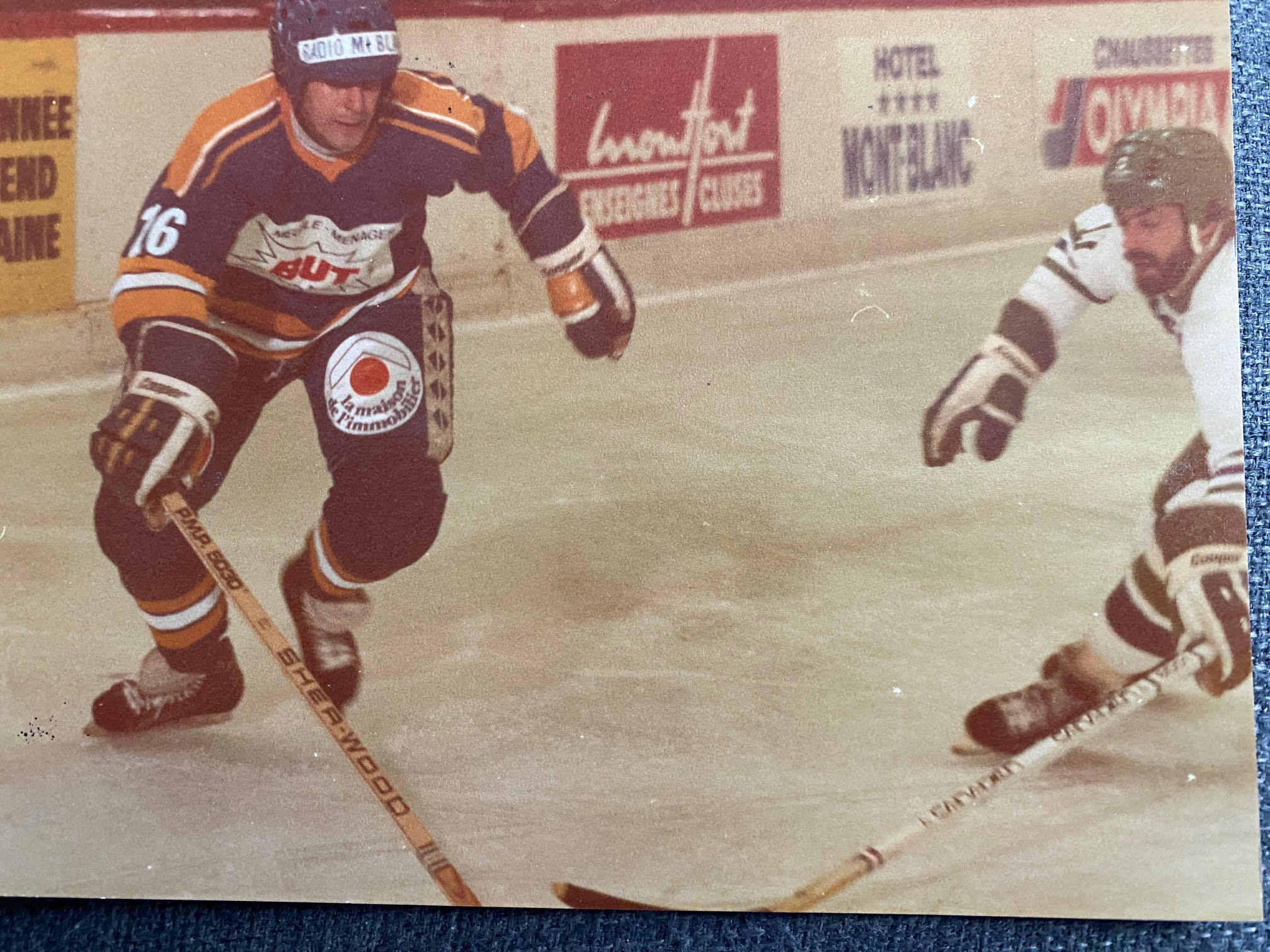

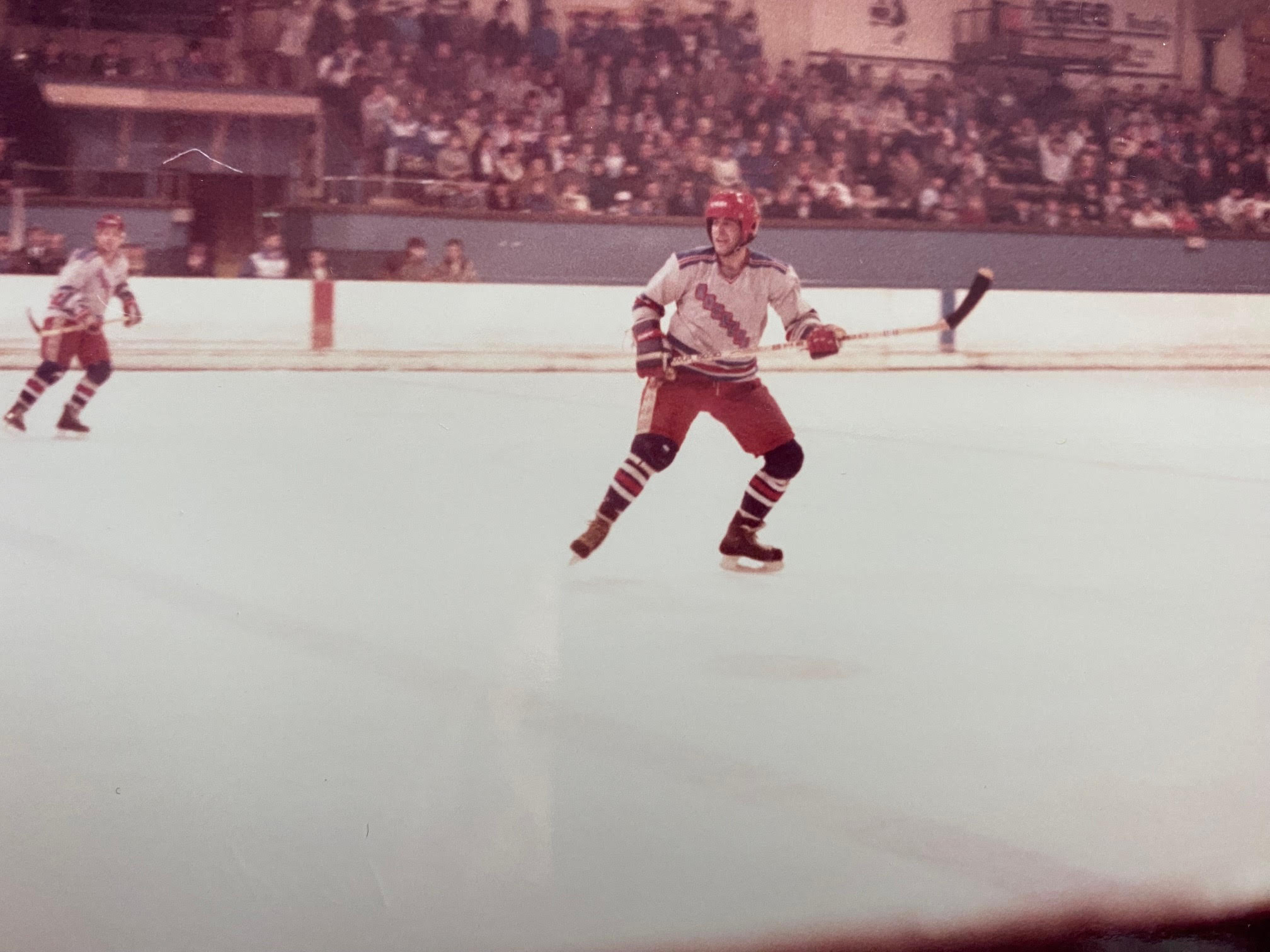

He played in three separate World Championships for France. Cote retired in 1991, shortly after being inducted into the Vermont Athletic Hall of Fame.

== Statistics ==
=== Regular season and playoffs ===
			Regular Season					Playoffs
Season	Team	League	GP	G	A	Pts	PIM	GP	G	A	Pts	PIM
1976–77	Vermont	ECAC Hockey	30	5	26	31	18	—	—	—	—	—
1977–78	Vermont	ECAC Hockey	31	10	30	40	18	—	—	—	—	—
1978–79	Vermont	ECAC Hockey	30	9	39	39	8	—	—	—	—	—
1979–80	Vermont	ECAC Hockey	24	4	28	32	20	—	—	—	—	—
1980–81	Carolina Thunderbirds	ACHL	17	3	10	13	6	—	—	—	—	—
1980–81	Sapporo Snow Brand	JIHL	—	—	—	—	—	—	—	—	—	—
1981–82	Sapporo Snow Brand	JIHL	—	—	—	—	—	—	—	—	—	—
1982–83	Sapporo Snow Brand	JIHL	—	—	—	—	—	—	—	—	—	—
1983–84	Chamonix HC	Nationale A	—	—	—	—	—	—	—	—	—	—
1984–85	Chamonix HC	Nationale A	—	—	—	—	—	—	—	—	—	—
1985–86	Dundee Rockets	BHL	36	23	73	96	32	6	3	10	13	8
1986–87	Ours de Villard-de-Lans	Nationale 1A	—	—	—	—	—	—	—	—	—	—
1987–88	Ours de Villard-de-Lans	Nationale 1A	—	—	—	—	—	—	—	—	—	—
1988–89	HC Amiens Somme	Nationale 1A	44	12	36	48	16	—	—	—	—	—
1989–90	HC Amiens Somme	Nationale 1A	39	8	13	21	8	—	—	—	—	—
1990–91	HC Amiens Somme	Ligue Nationale	27	3	8	11	2	4	0	0	0	2
NCAA totals			115	28	114	142	64	—	—	—	—	—

=== International ===
Year	Team	Event	Result	GP	G	A	Pts	PIM
1989	France	WC-B	11th	7	0	2	2	0
1990	France	WC-B	12th	7	0	0	0	2
1991	France	WC-B	11th	7	0	1	1	2
International totals				21	0	3	3	4

== Awards and honors ==
Award	Year
All-ECAC Hockey First Team	1978–79
AHCA East All-American	1978–79
All-ECAC Hockey First Team	1979–80
AHCA East All-American	1979–80
