= Kirk McCaskill =

Canadian-American baseball player and hockey player (born 1961)

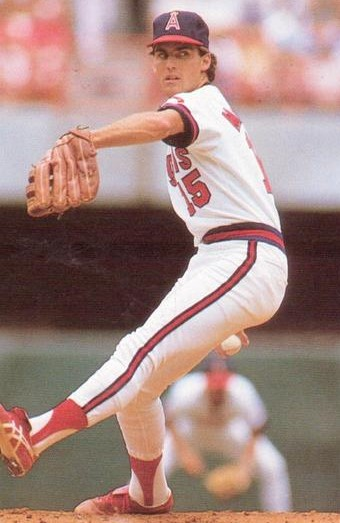
- Pitcher
- Born: April 9, 1961 (age 64); Kapuskasing, Ontario, Canada
- Batted: Right Threw: Right

MLB debut
- May 1, 1985, for the California Angels

Last MLB appearance
- July 20, 1996, for the Chicago White Sox

MLB statistics
- Win–loss record: 106–108
- Earned run average: 4.12
- Strikeouts: 1,003
- Stats at Baseball Reference

Teams
- California Angels (1985–1991); Chicago White Sox (1992–1996)

Member of the Canadian

Baseball Hall of Fame
- Induction: 2003

Kirk Edward McCaskill (born April 9, 1961) is a Canadian-American former Major League Baseball pitcher and former professional ice hockey player. He played in Major League Baseball for the California Angels and Chicago White Sox between 1985 and 1996, and played in the American Hockey League for the Sherbrooke Jets during the 1983–84 season.

== Early life ==
McCaskill was born in Kapuskasing, Ontario, where his father Ted McCaskill was playing for the local senior league hockey team at that time. As a child, McCaskill moved several times due to his father's professional hockey career, spending time in Nashville, Memphis, Vancouver, Phoenix, Newport Beach and Huntington Beach. McCaskill's father retired from hockey in 1975 after which his family settled in Paradise Valley, Arizona.

McCaskill attended Edison High School in Huntington Beach his freshman year before being accepted at Trinity-Pawling School in Pawling, New York. He moved to the boarding school mainly to pursue his hockey career, but continued to play baseball while there. During his senior year, McCaskill had an 8–0 record with an 0.97 ERA and 97 strikeouts, scored 26 goals and 22 assists in 17 hockey games, and was the varsity soccer team's leading goal-scorer. He turned down a baseball scholarship to Arizona State University so that he could pursue both hockey and baseball at the University of Vermont. In 1980, he played collegiate summer baseball in the Cape Cod Baseball League for the Yarmouth-Dennis Red Sox.

== Baseball career highlights ==
All-ECAC in baseball and hockey as a collegiate student-athlete, McCaskill was drafted in the fourth round of the 1982 amateur draft by the California Angels (88th overall), from the University of Vermont, and would be the first baseball player from UVM to reach the major leagues since Jack Lamabe in 1962. He debuted in 1985, and his break-out season was 1986 with the American League West champion California Angels. He compiled a win–loss record of 17–10, with a 3.36 earned run average and 202 strikeouts. He also totaled ten complete games on the season and would go on to have six seasons of ten or more wins, throw two one-hitters, and rank in the American League top ten in shutouts and earned run average three times each during his career.

On September 14, 1990, McCaskill surrendered back-to-back home runs to Ken Griffey Sr. and Ken Griffey Jr., who became the first father-son duo in MLB history to accomplish the feat.

== Baseball awards and honors ==
McCaskill was inducted into the Canadian Baseball Hall of Fame in the Class of 2003, along with Joe Carter, Richard Bélec, and the Asahi. In response to the news of induction, McCaskill was quoted as saying, "I am stunned by this wonderful news. I can't wait to tell my family and my parents. I am very proud of my Canadian heritage, and this is going to be an honor of a lifetime."

== Hockey career highlights ==
McCaskill played center and right wing for the University of Vermont from 1979 to 1983, and in 1982 was a finalist for the Hobey Baker Award and was named to that season's NCAA East All-America First Team and the ECAC All-Star First Team. He was the team captain during the 1982–83 season, and won the Cunningham Award as the Most Valuable Player on the Catamounts.

McCaskill was drafted in the fourth round (64th overall) by the Winnipeg Jets in the 1981 NHL entry draft, playing only one season of professional hockey for the Sherbrooke Jets, a Jets farm team, and dressed for one game with the Winnipeg Jets of the NHL but did not play in the game. During the 1983–84 season, he scored 10 goals and added 12 assists for 22 points. He retired from professional hockey after that one season to focus solely on his professional baseball career.

For his achievements in hockey and baseball, McCaskill was inducted into the Vermont Sports Hall of Fame in 2015.

== Hockey awards and honors ==
Award	Year
All-ECAC Hockey First Team	1981–82
AHCA East All-American	1981–82

== Personal ==
McCaskill and his wife, Dana, have three sons, Riley, Reese, and Bennett, and currently reside in Cardiff by the Sea, California.

McCaskill holds both dual Canadian and U.S. citizenships.

He became the head baseball coach at The Bishop's School in La Jolla, California, in November 2020, having previously been the head coach at Torrey Pines High School in San Diego.
