= 2022 Hockey East men's ice hockey tournament =

2022 Hockey East Men's ice hockey tournament
- Dates: March 9–19, 2021
- Teams: 11
- Finals site: TD Garden; Boston, Massachusetts
- Champions: Massachusetts (2nd title)
- Winning coach: Greg Carvel (2nd title)
- MVP: Bobby Trivigno (Massachusetts)
- Hockey East Men's Ice Hockey Tournaments

The 2022 Hockey East Men's Ice Hockey Tournament was the 37th tournament in the history of the conference. It was played between March 9 and March 19, 2022. As the tournament champions, Massachusetts received the conference's automatic bid into the 2022 NCAA Division I Men's Ice Hockey Tournament.

== Format ==
The tournament included all eleven teams in the conference. Teams were ranked according to their finish in the conference standings. Seeds 1–5 earned a bye into the quarterfinal round, while seeds 6–11 played to determine the remaining quarterfinalists. Winners in the opening round were reseeded and advanced to play top three seeds in reverse order. Winners of the quarterfinal matches were again reseeded for the semifinal, and the winners of those two games faced off in the championship.

All series were single-elimination with opening round and quarterfinal matches occurring at home team sites. Beginning with the semifinal round, all games were held at the TD Garden. The tournament champion received an automatic bid into the 2022 NCAA Division I Men's Ice Hockey Tournament

== Standings ==
2021–22 Hockey East Standings
	Conference record										Overall record					
	GP	W	L	T	OTW	OTL	SOW	PTS	GF	GA	GP	W	L	T	GF	GA
#12 Northeastern †	24	15	8	1	1	1	1	47	68	46	39	25	13	1	99	68
#10 Massachusetts *	24	14	8	2	2	3	1	46	77	54	37	22	13	2	117	88
#13 Massachusetts Lowell	24	15	8	1	1	0	1	46	62	48	35	21	11	3	102	74
#19 Connecticut	24	14	10	0	2	1	0	41	73	61	36	20	16	0	109	89
Boston University	24	13	8	3	3	2	0	41	69	58	35	19	13	3	107	89
Merrimack	24	13	11	0	1	3	0	41	70	70	35	19	15	1	109	99
#20 Providence	24	12	11	1	1	1	1	38	61	52	38	22	14	2	118	82
Boston College	24	9	12	3	0	1	1	32	67	77	38	15	18	5	114	123
New Hampshire	24	8	15	1	2	2	0	25	47	71	34	14	19	1	76	95
Vermont	24	6	16	2	3	1	2	20	41	72	35	8	25	2	59	101
Maine	24	5	17	2	2	3	1	19	54	80	33	7	22	4	74	111
Championship: March 19, 2022 † indicates regular season champion * indicates conference tournament champion (Lamoriello Trophy); Rankings: USCHO.com Top 20 Poll

== Bracket ==
Teams are reseeded after the Opening Round and Quarterfinals

Opening Round; March 9
6	Merrimack	6
11	Maine	2
7	Providence	2
10	Vermont	1
8	Boston College	4*
9	New Hampshire	3

Quarterfinals; March 12
1	Northeastern	3
8	Boston College	2
2	Massachusetts	4
7	Providence	2
3	Massachusetts Lowell	7
6	Merrimack	2
4	Connecticut	3
5	Boston University	1

Semifinals; March 18
1	Northeastern	1
4	Connecticut	4
2	Massachusetts	3
3	Massachusetts Lowell	1

Championship; March 19
4	Connecticut	1
2	Massachusetts	2*

Note: * denotes overtime period(s)

== Results ==
=== Opening Round ===
==== (6) Merrimack vs. (11) Maine ====
March 9, 2022; 7:00 PM	Merrimack	6–2 (1–0, 2–1, 3–1)	Maine	J. Thom Lawler Rink, North Andover, Massachusetts; Attendance: 2,549

Game reference

Hugo Ollas
Goalies
Matthew Thiessen

(Jefferies, Newton) Steven Jandric (8) – PP – 12:23	1–0
(Walsh, Seyfert) Filip Forsmark (11) – 20:34	2–0
(Welsher, Uens) Matt Copponi (3) – GW – 24:07	3–0
	3–1	33:49 – Lynden Breen (9) (Poisson)
(Brown, Jandric) Max Newton (13) – 43:45	4–1
(Forsmark, Copponi) Liam Walsh (10) – 51:06	5–1
(Forsmark) Max Newton (14) – EN – 57:02	6–1
	6–2	57:37 – Matthew Fawcett (5) (Mulera, Quinlivan)

2 min
Penalties
4 min
25
Shots
28

==== (7) Providence vs. (10) Vermont ====
March 9, 2022; 7:00 PM	Providence	2–1 (0–0, 1–0, 1–1)	Vermont	Schneider Arena, Providence, Rhode Island; Attendance: 1,095

Game reference

Jaxson Stauber
Goalies
Gabe Carriere

(Stauber) Cody Monds (5) – 26:01	1–0
(Ford) Brett Berard (18) – GW – 43:19	2–0
	2–1	58:02 – PP, EA – Joel Maatta (3) (Stucker, Leahy)

2 min
Penalties
2 min
40
Shots
18

==== (8) Boston College vs. (9) New Hampshire ====
March 9, 2022; 7:00 PM	Boston College	4–3 (OT) (1–1, 2–0, 0–2, 1–0)	New Hampshire	Conte Forum, Chestnut Hill, Massachusetts; Attendance: 1,125

Game reference

Eric Dop
Goalies
Mike Robinson
Referees:
Geno Binda, Jr
Steven Rouillard
Linesmen:
Steven Murray
Bob Bernard

(Warren, McLaughlin) Jack McBain (19) – 6:08	1–0
	1–1	18:17 – Tyler Ward (9) (Cronin, Jenson)
(St. Ivany) Nikita Nesterenko (7) – SH – 22:48	2–1
(Helleson, McBain) Marc McLaughlin (20) – PP – 34:42	3–1
	3–2	48:41 – PP – Tyler Ward (10) (Pierson, Engaras)
	3–3	55:11 – PP – Tyler Ward (11) (Eriksson, Engaras)
(Warren, McBain) Marc McLaughlin (21) – GW – 70:56	4–3

10 min
Penalties
8 min
27
Shots
47

=== Quarterfinals ===
==== (1) Northeastern vs. (8) Boston College ====
March 12, 2022; 7:30 PM	Northeastern	3–2 (0–0, 3–0, 0–2)	Boston College	Matthews Arena, Boston, Massachusetts; Attendance: 2,304

Game reference

Devon Levi
Goalies
Eric Dop
Referees:
Geoffrey Miller
Terrence Murphy
Linesmen:
Trevor Disbennett
Jeff McCorkle

(Novak, Struble) Gunnarwolfe Fontaine (8) – 22:34	1–0
(Fontaine, Novak) Justin Hryckowian (7) – 29:53	2–0
(Hughes, McDonough) Sam Colangelo (12) – GW – 39:14	3–0
	3–1	48:29 – PP – Drew Helleson (4) (McBain, Kruse)
	3–2	56:12 – Marshall Warren (6) (McLaughlin, Argentina)

4 min
Penalties
0 min
36
Shots
48

==== (2) Massachusetts vs. (7) Providence ====
March 12, 2022; 7:00 PM	Massachusetts	4–2 (2–0, 1–1, 1–1)	Providence	Mullins Center, Amherst, Massachusetts; Attendance: 2,422

Game reference

Matt Murray
Goalies
Jaxson Stauber
Referees:
Tim Benedetto
Jeremy Tufts
Linesmen:
Bob Bernard
Steven Murray

(Trivigno, Ufko) Josh Lopina (11) – 5:30	1–0
(Morrow, Ufko) Josh Lopina (12) – PP – 9:51	2–0
(Lopina, Bohlinger) Bobby Trivigno (18) – GW – 27:03	3–0
	3–1	34:01 – Riley Duran (10) (Crozier, Monds)
unassisted Cal Kiefiuk (6) – EN – 57:39	4–1
	4–2	58:24 – Matt Koopman (5) (Olischefski)

6 min
Penalties
2 min
19
Shots
47

==== (3) Massachusetts Lowell vs. (6) Merrimack ====
March 12, 2022; 4:30 PM	Massachusetts Lowell	7–2 (2–1, 3–0, 2–1)	Merrimack	Tsongas Center, Lowell, Massachusetts; Attendance: 5,782

Game reference

Owen Savory
Goalies
Hugo Ollas
Zachary Borgiel
Referees:
Walker Holton
Peter Schlittenhardt
Linesmen:
Kevin Briganti
Kyle Richetelle

(Knoblauch, Wells) Connor Sodergren (4) – 1:04	1–0
(Jonsson, Lee) Carl Berglund (8) – 7:55	2–0
	2–1	17:36 – Logan Drevitch (5) (Messner)
(McDonald, Condotta) Ben Meehan (5) – PP, GW – 25:33	3–1
(Lee, Jonsson) Carl Berglund (9) – 28:44	4–1
(Jonsson, Engum) Ryan Brushett (8) – 34:22	5–1
	5–2	48:20 – PP – Alex Jefferies (10) (Forsmark, Jandric)
(Brushett, Kaiser) Owen Cole (3) – 50:27	6–2
(Crasa) Lucas Condotta (9) – EN – 58:18	7–2

4 min
Penalties
4 min
32
Shots
41

==== (4) Connecticut vs. (5) Boston University ====
March 12, 2022; 4:30 PM	Connecticut	3–1 (1–0, 1–0, 1–1)	Boston University	XL Center, Hartford, Connecticut; Attendance: 3,416

Game reference

Darion Hanson
Goalies
Drew Commesso
Referees:
Eugene Binda
Steven Rouillard
Linesmen:
Bill Kingdon
Christopher Millea

(Flynn, Kondelik) Vladislav Firstov (10) – 16:00	1–0
(Gatcomb, Wheeler) Jonny Evans (6) – GW – 30:26	2–0
	2–1	53:01 – PP – Domenick Fensore (5) (O'Brien, Mastrosimone)
(Gatcomb, Hanson) Chase Bradley (4) – EN – 59:50	3–1

4 min
Penalties
6 min
36
Shots
39

=== Semifinals ===
==== (1) Northeastern vs. (4) Connecticut ====
March 18, 2022; 4:00 PM	Northeastern	1–4 (1–1, 0–1, 0–2)	Connecticut	TD Garden, Boston, Massachusetts; Attendance: 13,106

Game reference

Devon Levi
Goalies
Darion Hanson
Referees:
Walker Holton
Peter Schlittenbardt
Linesmen:
Bob Bernard
Steven Murray

	0–1	11:39 – Vladislav Firstov (11) (Capone, Bradley)
(Harris, Fontaine) Aidan McDonough (24) – PP – 14:13	1–1
	1–2	33:47 – GW – Roman Kinal (3) (Bradley, Reese)
	1–3	44:32 – Ryan Tverberg (14) unassisted
	1–4	57:52 – EN – Marc Gatcomb (8) unassisted

8 min
Penalties
12 min
25
Shots
37

==== (2) Massachusetts vs. (3) Massachusetts Lowell ====
March 18, 2022; 7:30 PM	Massachusetts	3–1 (2–0, 0–1, 1–0)	Massachusetts Lowell	TD Garden, Boston, Massachusetts; Attendance: 13,106

Game reference

Matt Murray
Goalies
Owen Savory
Referees:
Geoff Miller
Steve Rouillard
Linesmen:
Jeff McCorkle
Kyle Richetelle

(Lopina, Morrow) Garret Wait (12) – PP – 12:27	1–0
(Wait) Bobby Trivigno (19) – GW – 14:10	2–0
	2–1	36:37 – Matt Crasa (12) (Austin, Condatta)
unassisted Jerry Harding (1) – 53:00	3–1

2 min
Penalties
4 min
19
Shots
23

=== Championship ===
==== (2) Massachusetts vs. (4) Connecticut ====
March 19, 2022; 7:00 PM	Massachusetts	2–1 (OT) (0–0, 1–1, 0–0, 1–0)	Connecticut	TD Garden, Boston, Massachusetts; Attendance: 12,049

Game reference

Matt Murray
Goalies
Darion Hanson
Referees:
Geno Binda, Jr.
Jeremy Tufts
Linesmen:
Kevin Briganti
Billy Kingdon

	0–1	22:25 – Vladislav Firstov (12) (Spetz, Berger)
(Felix) Bobby Trivigno (20) – 36:06	1–1
(Trivigno, Del Gaizo) Aaron Bohlinger (2) – GW – 63:06	2–1

2 min
Penalties
2 min
33
Shots
20

== Tournament Awards ==
=== All-Tournament Team ===
- Goaltender – Matt Murray, Massachusetts
- Defenceman – John Spetz, Connecticut
- Defenceman – Colin Felix, Massachusetts
- Forward – Vladislav Firstov, Connecticut
- Forward – Garrett Wait, Massachusetts
- Forward – Bobby Trivigno, Massachusetts

=== Tournament MVP ===
- Bobby Trivigno, Massachusetts
