= 2021–22 UMass Minutemen ice hockey season =

Hockey East Tournament, Champion NCAA Tournament, Northeast Regional semifinal
- Conference: T–2nd Hockey East
- Home ice: Mullins Center

Rankings
- USCHO: #10
- USA Today: #10

Record
- Overall: 22–13–2
- Conference: 14–8–2
- Home: 11–8–0
- Road: 9–4–2
- Neutral: 2–1–0

Coaches and captains
- Head coach: Greg Carvel
- Assistant coaches: Jared DeMichiel; Matt Lindsay; Nolan Gluchowski
- Captain: Bobby Trivigno
- Alternate captain(s): Colin Felix; Matthew Kessel

The 2021–22 UMass Minutemen ice hockey season was the 90th season of play for the program. They represented the University of Massachusetts Amherst in the 2021–22 NCAA Division I men's ice hockey season and for the 28th season in the Hockey East conference. The Minutemen were coached by Greg Carvel, in his sixth season, and played their home games at Mullins Center.

== Season ==
Fresh off of the program's first national championship, Massachusetts would have to overcome a sizable loss of talent if they wanted a repeat performance. While the team still possessed many returning players, including tournament MOP Bobby Trivigno, several players had left early for professional careers after outstanding seasons. While the team lost Filip Lindberg, Matt Murray had shared the starting role in net so the team was not without an experienced and proven goaltender. However, the losses were felt in the opening weekend when the Minutemen were swept by Minnesota State at home.

The team performed better over the succeeding month and won each of their next six games but then played poorly in the middle of November and saw their ranking sink down into the mid-teens. UMass suffered from Hockey East's poor performance in non-conference games. This meant that victories against their conference rivals, even ranked opponents, would not help their postseason hopes as much as it would in other years. For the remainder of the season, Massachusetts would hover around #10 in the national rankings as they weren't able to put together any extended winning streaks. Throughout the team's up and down play, Trivigno was the leading light offensively. Not only did he finish 16 points better than any other Minuteman but he ended up tied for third in the national scoring race.

Entering the final week of the regular season, UMass had a 5-point lead in the conference standings and needed just one point to guarantee itself a share of the Hockey East title. Instead, the Minutemen lost both games to Boston College by 1-goal margins while Northeastern swept its weekend finale to surge past Massachusetts. Aside from the stunning result, the losses forced UMass to play Providence in the quarterfinals. The Minutemen were badly outshot by the Friars in the match, 19–47, but Matt Murray stood tall and held the fort while the offense made the most of its sparse opportunities. They were again outshot in the semifinal, though that time only by 4, and managed to knock off Massachusetts Lowell behind Trivigno's second game-winner of the postseason.

Before the championship game, UMass knew they were mathematically guaranteed to receive a bid to the NCAA tournament but they weren't going to let that slow them down. Trivigno tied the game just past the midway point and, though he didn't net the winner, he assisted on the final goal that sealed their second consecutive Hockey East Championship.

Despite riding high after a conference victory, UMass could still only garner a #3 seed for the national tournament. This forced the team into an underdog role against one of the tournament favorites, Minnesota. The Minutemen got off to a decent start and then netted two quick goals in the later half of the first. The Gophers added their own before the period was out but UMass rebuilt its 2-goal advantage early in the second. After that, however, Minnesota slowly chipped away at Massachusetts' lead and ended up tying the game on the power play late in the third. Once overtime began, both teams looked to end things quickly. Unfortunately for the Minutemen, it was Ben Meyers, captain of the Gophers, who scored the final goal and ended the Minutemen's season.

== Departures ==
Player	Position	Nationality	Cause
Gianfranco Cassaro	Defenseman	Canada	Transferred to RIT
Oliver Chau	Forward	Canada	Graduate transfer to Quinnipiac
Marc Del Gaizo	Defenseman	United States	Signed professional contract (Nashville Predators)
Jake Gaudet	Forward	Canada	Graduation (signed with Cleveland Monsters)
Carson Gicewicz	Forward	United States	Graduation (signed with Rockford IceHogs)
Zac Jones	Defenseman	United States	Signed professional contract (New York Rangers)
Philip Lagunov	Forward	Canada	Graduate transfer to Vermont
Filip Lindberg	Goaltender	Finland	Signed professional contract (Pittsburgh Penguins)
George Mika	Forward	United States	Graduation (retired)
Zac Steigmeyer	Goaltender	United States	Graduation (retired)
Kolby Vegara	Defenseman	United States	Left Program (retired)

== Recruiting ==
Player	Position	Nationality	Age	Notes
Matt Baker	Forward	Canada	24	Midhurst, ON; graduate transfer from Dartmouth
Eric DeDobbelaer	Forward	Canada	21	Brantford, ON
Slava Demin	Defenseman	United States	21	Cypress, CA; transfer from Denver; Selected 99th overall in 2018 NHL entry draft
Cam Donaldson	Forward	United States	23	Pittsboro, NC; graduate transfer from Cornell
Ryan Lautenbach	Forward	United States	21	Brighton, MI
Taylor Makar	Forward	Canada	20	Calgary, AB; Selected 220th overall in 2021 NHL entry draft
Lucas Mercuri	Forward	Canada	19	Montreal, QC; Selected 159th overall in 2020 NHL entry draft
Scott Morrow	Defenseman	United States	18	Darien, CT; Selected 40th overall in 2021 NHL entry draft
Luke Pavicich	Goaltender	United States	19	Clarence Center, NY
Ryan Ufko	Defenseman	United States	18	Smithtown, NY; Selected 115th overall in 2021 NHL entry draft

== Roster ==
As of August 12, 2021.

No.	Nat.	Player	Class	Pos	Height	Weight	DoB	Hometown	Previous team	NHL rights
1	(United States)	Luke Pavicich	Freshman	G	6' 3" (1.91 m)	174 lb (79 kg)	2002-03-21	Clarence Center, New York	Kenai River Brown Bears (NAHL)	—
3	(United States)	Ty Farmer	Senior	D	5' 11" (1.8 m)	175 lb (79 kg)	1998-01-06	O'Fallon, Missouri	Fargo Force (USHL)	—
4	(United States)	Matthew Kessel (A)	Junior	D	6' 3" (1.91 m)	203 lb (92 kg)	2000-06-23	Bloomfield Hills, Michigan	Sioux Falls Stampede (USHL)	STL, 150th overall 2020
5	(United States)	Linden Alger	Sophomore	D	6' 3" (1.91 m)	194 lb (88 kg)	2000-04-09	Centerville, Massachusetts	Youngstown Phantoms (USHL)	—
6	(United States)	Ryan Ufko	Freshman	D	5' 10" (1.78 m)	181 lb (82 kg)	2003-05-07	Smithtown, New York	Chicago Steel (USHL)	NSH, 115th overall 2021
7	(United States)	Cal Kiefiuk	Junior	F	5' 10" (1.78 m)	185 lb (84 kg)	2000-02-28	Macomb, Michigan	Central Illinois Flying Aces (USHL)	—
8	(United States)	Bobby Trivigno (C)	Senior	F	5' 8" (1.73 m)	162 lb (73 kg)	1999-01-19	Setauket, New York	Waterloo Black Hawks (USHL)	—
9	(United States)	Cam Donaldson	Graduate	F	5' 8" (1.73 m)	170 lb (77 kg)	1998-07-14	Pittsboro, North Carolina	Cornell (ECAC)	—
10	(United States)	Josh Lopina	Sophomore	F	6' 2" (1.88 m)	194 lb (88 kg)	2001-02-16	Minooka, Illinois	Lincoln Stars (USHL)	ANA, 98th overall 2021
11	(Canada)	Lucas Mercuri	Freshman	F	6' 3" (1.91 m)	192 lb (87 kg)	2002-03-07	Montreal, Quebec	Des Moines Buccaneers (USHL)	CAR, 159th overall 2020
12	(United States)	Garrett Wait	Senior	F	6' 0" (1.83 m)	190 lb (86 kg)	1998-06-13	Edina, Minnesota	Minnesota (Big Ten)	—
13	(United States)	Reed Lebster	Junior	F	6' 0" (1.83 m)	188 lb (85 kg)	1999-03-04	Grand Rapids, Michigan	Des Moines Buccaneers (USHL)	—
14	(United States)	Ryan Lautenbach	Freshman	F	5' 11" (1.8 m)	185 lb (84 kg)	2000-02-27	Brighton, Michigan	Omaha Lancers (USHL)	—
15	(United States)	Oliver MacDonald	Sophomore	F	5' 10" (1.78 m)	185 lb (84 kg)	2000-11-07	Grosse Pointe, Michigan	Fargo Force (USHL)	—
17	(United States)	Slava Demin	Senior	D	6' 3" (1.91 m)	191 lb (87 kg)	2000-04-04	Cypress, California	Denver (NCHC)	VGK, 99th overall 2018
18	(Canada)	Taylor Makar	Freshman	F	6' 3" (1.91 m)	190 lb (86 kg)	2001-03-13	Calgary, Alberta	Brooks Bandits (AJHL)	—
19	(United States)	Ryan Sullivan	Sophomore	F	5' 11" (1.8 m)	190 lb (86 kg)	2000-03-07	Grosse Pointe, Michigan	Sioux Falls Stampede (USHL)	—
20	(Canada)	Matt Baker	Graduate	F	5' 11" (1.8 m)	175 lb (79 kg)	1997-02-21	Barrie, Ontario	Dartmouth (ECAC)	—
22	(United States)	Jerry Harding	Junior	F	6' 2" (1.88 m)	210 lb (95 kg)	1999-03-22	Canton, Massachusetts	Providence (HEA)	—
23	(United States)	Scott Morrow	Freshman	D	6' 2" (1.88 m)	192 lb (87 kg)	2002-11-01	Darien, Connecticut	Shattuck-Saint Mary's (Midget AAA)	CAR, 40th overall 2021
25	(United States)	Aaron Bohlinger	Sophomore	D	5' 9" (1.75 m)	165 lb (75 kg)	2000-08-25	Walden, New York	Waterloo Black Hawks (USHL)	—
26	(United States)	Colin Felix (A)	Senior	D	6' 1" (1.85 m)	193 lb (88 kg)	1999-01-07	Ocean City, New Jersey	Madison Capitols (USHL)	—
27	(United States)	Anthony Del Gaizo	Senior	F	5' 10" (1.78 m)	193 lb (88 kg)	1998-01-31	Basking Ridge, New Jersey	Muskegon Lumberjacks (USHL)	—
28	(Canada)	Eric Faith	Junior	F	5' 11" (1.8 m)	181 lb (82 kg)	1998-04-18	Carp, Ontario	Brockville Braves (CCHL)	—
29	(Canada)	Eric DeDobbelaer	Freshman	F	5' 10" (1.78 m)	180 lb (82 kg)	2000-06-15	Brantford, Ontario	Brantford 99ers (OJHL)	—
31	(Canada)	Matt Murray	Graduate	G	6' 1" (1.85 m)	194 lb (88 kg)	1998-02-02	St. Albert, Alberta	Fargo Force (USHL)	—
32	(United States)	Henry Graham	Sophomore	G	6' 0" (1.83 m)	181 lb (82 kg)	2000-07-25	Manhattan, New York	P.A.L. Jr. Islanders (NCDC)	—

== Standings ==
2021–22 Hockey East Standings
	Conference record										Overall record					
	GP	W	L	T	OTW	OTL	SOW	PTS	GF	GA	GP	W	L	T	GF	GA
#12 Northeastern †	24	15	8	1	1	1	1	47	68	46	39	25	13	1	99	68
#10 Massachusetts *	24	14	8	2	2	3	1	46	77	54	37	22	13	2	117	88
#13 Massachusetts Lowell	24	15	8	1	1	0	1	46	62	48	35	21	11	3	102	74
#19 Connecticut	24	14	10	0	2	1	0	41	73	61	36	20	16	0	109	89
Boston University	24	13	8	3	3	2	0	41	69	58	35	19	13	3	107	89
Merrimack	24	13	11	0	1	3	0	41	70	70	35	19	15	1	109	99
#20 Providence	24	12	11	1	1	1	1	38	61	52	38	22	14	2	118	82
Boston College	24	9	12	3	0	1	1	32	67	77	38	15	18	5	114	123
New Hampshire	24	8	15	1	2	2	0	25	47	71	34	14	19	1	76	95
Vermont	24	6	16	2	3	1	2	20	41	72	35	8	25	2	59	101
Maine	24	5	17	2	2	3	1	19	54	80	33	7	22	4	74	111
Championship: March 19, 2022 † indicates regular season champion * indicates conference tournament champion (Lamoriello Trophy); Rankings: USCHO.com Top 20 Poll

== Schedule and results ==
Date	Time	Opponent^{#}	Rank^{#}	Site	TV	Decision	Result	Attendance	Record
Regular season
October 2	7:30 PM	#5 Minnesota State*	#1	Mullins Center • Amherst, Massachusetts		Murray	L 0–2	8,412	0–1–0
October 3	4:00 PM	#5 Minnesota State*	#1	Mullins Center • Amherst, Massachusetts		Murray	L 3–6	3,808	0–2–0
October 15	7:05 PM	at American International*	#9	MassMutual Center • Springfield, Massachusetts		Murray	W 5–1	1,306	1–2–0
October 16	7:00 PM	American International*	#9	Mullins Center • Amherst, Massachusetts		Murray	W 4–2	4,664	2–2–0
October 23	7:00 PM	Dartmouth*	#9	Mullins Center • Amherst, Massachusetts (Exhibition)			L 2–3		
October 29	7:00 PM	at Merrimack	#12	J. Thom Lawler Rink • North Andover, Massachusetts	NESN+	Murray	W 5–4 ^{OT}	3,477	3–2–0 (1–0–0)
October 30	7:00 PM	Merrimack	#12	Mullins Center • Amherst, Massachusetts		Murray	W 2–1	2,083	4–2–0 (2–0–0)
November 5	7:00 PM	#7 Providence	#12	Mullins Center • Amherst, Massachusetts	NESN	Murray	W 1–0	4,485	5–2–0 (3–0–0)
November 6	7:00 PM	#7 Providence	#12	Schneider Arena • Providence, Rhode Island	NESN+	Murray	W 5–1	3,169	6–2–0 (4–0–0)
November 12	7:30 PM	at Boston University	#8	Agganis Arena • Boston, Massachusetts		Murray	T 2–2 ^{SOW}	4,149	6–2–1 (4–0–1)
November 13	7:00 PM	Boston University	#8	Mullins Center • Amherst, Massachusetts	NESN	Murray	L 3–4 ^{OT}	5,741	6–3–1 (4–1–1)
November 19	7:00 PM	New Hampshire	#8	Whittemore Center • Durham, New Hampshire	NESN	Murray	W 3–0	4,363	7–3–1 (5–1–1)
November 20	7:00 PM	at New Hampshire	#8	Whittemore Center • Durham, New Hampshire		Murray	L 1–2 ^{OT}	4,316	7–4–1 (5–2–1)
December 3	7:15 PM	at #15 Massachusetts Lowell	#14	Tsongas Center • Lowell, Massachusetts	NESN	Murray	T 4–4 ^{SOL}	6,289	7–4–2 (5–2–2)
December 4	7:00 PM	#15 Massachusetts Lowell	#14	Mullins Center • Amherst, Massachusetts		Murray	W 3–2	5,423	8–4–2 (6–2–2)
December 9	7:00 PM	at Merrimack	#12	J. Thom Lawler Rink • North Andover, Massachusetts		Murray	W 3–2	2,122	9–4–2 (7–2–2)
January 3	6:00 PM	at Merrimack*	#10	Mullins Center • Amherst, Massachusetts		Murray	W 4–3 ^{OT}	529	10–4–2
January 8	5:00 PM	at #6 Michigan*	#10	Yost Ice Arena • Ann Arbor, Michigan	BTN	Murray	L 1–4	5,800	10–5–2
January 9	4:00 PM	at #6 Michigan*	#10	Yost Ice Arena • Ann Arbor, Michigan	ESPNU	Murray	L 2–4	5,800	10–6–2
January 21	7:00 PM	#12 Northeastern	#14	Mullins Center • Amherst, Massachusetts	NESN	Murray	W 3–2	3,542	11–6–2 (8–2–2)
January 22	7:30 PM	at #12 Northeastern	#14	Matthews Arena • Boston, Massachusetts	NESN+	Murray	W 6–0	0	12–6–2 (9–2–2)
January 25	7:00 PM	Boston University	#9	Mullins Center • Amherst, Massachusetts	NESN	Pavicich	L 4–6	6,269	12–7–2 (9–3–2)
January 28	7:00 PM	#17 Providence	#9	Mullins Center • Amherst, Massachusetts	NESN+	Murray	L 1–2	4,493	12–8–2 (9–4–2)
January 30	1:05 PM	at #14 Massachusetts Lowell	#9	Tsongas Center • Lowell, Massachusetts		Murray	W 4–3	3,745	13–8–2 (10–4–2)
February 4	7:00 PM	Long Island*	#10	Mullins Center • Amherst, Massachusetts		Murray	W 6–3	3,274	14–8–2
February 5	7:00 PM	Long Island*	#10	Mullins Center • Amherst, Massachusetts		Pavicich	W 3–1	3,410	15–8–2
February 11	7:00 PM	Maine	#9	Mullins Center • Amherst, Massachusetts		Murray	L 2–3 ^{OT}	3,294	15–9–2 (10–5–2)
February 12	7:00 PM	Maine	#9	Mullins Center • Amherst, Massachusetts	NESN	Murray	W 4–2	3,434	16–9–2 (11–5–2)
February 18	7:05 PM	at #20 Connecticut	#10	XL Center • Hartford, Connecticut		Murray	W 2–1	4,358	17–9–2 (12–5–2)
February 19	7:00 PM	#20 Connecticut	#10	Mullins Center • Amherst, Massachusetts		Murray	L 2–4	5,036	17–10–2 (12–6–2)
February 25	7:00 PM	at Vermont	#10	Gutterson Fieldhouse • Burlington, Vermont		Murray	W 5–1	2,304	18–10–2 (13–6–2)
February 26	7:00 PM	at Vermont	#10	Gutterson Fieldhouse • Burlington, Vermont		Murray	W 8–2	2,380	19–10–2 (14–6–2)
March 4	7:00 PM	at Boston College	#9	Conte Forum • Chestnut Hill, Massachusetts	NESN	Murray	L 1–2	5,524	19–11–2 (14–7–2)
March 5	4:30 PM	Boston College	#9	Mullins Center • Amherst, Massachusetts	NESN+	Murray	L 3–4	5,736	19–12–2 (14–8–2)
Hockey East Tournament
March 12	7:00 PM	#20 Providence*	#12	Mullins Center • Amherst, Massachusetts (Quarterfinal)		Murray	W 4–2	2,422	20–12–2
March 18	7:30 PM	vs. #13 Massachusetts Lowell*	#11	TD Garden • Boston, Massachusetts (Semifinal)	NESN+	Murray	W 3–1	13,106	21–12–2
March 19	7:00 PM	vs. #19 Connecticut*	#11	TD Garden • Boston, Massachusetts (Championship)	NESN	Murray	W 2–1 ^{OT}	12,049	22–12–2
NCAA Tournament
March 25	6:00 PM	vs. #5 Minnesota*	#10	DCU Center • Worcester, Massachusetts (Northeast Regional semifinal)	ESPNU	Murray	L 3–4 ^{OT}	6,002	22–13–2
*Non-conference game. ^{#}Rankings from USCHO.com Poll. All times are in Eastern Time. Source:

== Scoring statistics ==
Name	Position	Games	Goals	Assists	Points	PIM
Bobby Trivigno	LW	37	20	29	49	28
Scott Morrow	D	37	13	20	33	10
Ryan Ufko	D	37	5	26	31	12
Josh Lopina	C	27	12	15	27	8
Garrett Wait	LW	32	13	12	25	12
Reed Lebster	RW	36	9	9	18	23
Cal Kiefiuk	F	30	6	12	18	24
Anthony Del Gaizo	F	36	7	10	17	12
Matthew Kessel	D	37	6	11	17	22
Lucas Mercuri	C	36	6	9	15	18
Aaron Bohlinger	D	28	2	11	13	4
Ryan Lautenbach	RW	31	3	7	10	2
Colin Felix	D	36	2	8	10	30
Ty Farmer	D	36	1	8	9	24
Eric Faith	LW	32	2	4	6	6
Oliver MacDonald	F	27	3	2	5	6
Ryan Sullivan	F	33	2	2	4	4
Matt Baker	C	19	1	2	3	6
Slava Demin	D	22	1	2	3	4
Cam Donaldson	C	27	1	2	3	4
Taylor Makar	C/LW	17	1	0	1	12
Jerry Harding	F	30	1	0	1	2
Henry Graham	G	1	0	0	0	4
Luke Pavicich	G	4	0	0	0	0
Linden Alger	D	11	0	0	0	2
Matt Murray	G	36	0	0	0	2
Total			117	201	318	277

== Goaltending statistics ==
Name	Games	Minutes	Wins	Losses	Ties	Goals against	Saves	Shut outs	SV %	GAA
Luke Pavicich	4	111	1	1	0	3	42	0	.933	1.62
Matt Murray	36	2128	21	12	2	82	910	3	.917	2.31
Empty Net	-	14	-	-	-	3	-	-	-	-
Total	37	2253	22	13	2	88	952	3	.915	2.34

== Rankings ==
Poll	Week																									
Poll	Pre	1	2	3	4	5	6	7	8	9	10	11	12	13	14	15	16	17	18	19	20	21	22	23	24	25 (Final)
USCHO.com	1	7	9	9	12	12	8	8	13	14	12	12	10	14	14	9	10	9	10	10	9	12	11	10	-	10
USA Today	1	6	9	9	10	12	9	8	13	14	12	12	9	14	12	8	9	9	9	10	9	12	12	9	10	10

Note: USCHO did not release a poll in week 24.

== Awards and honors ==
Player	Award	Ref
Scott Morrow	AHCA East First Team All-American	
Bobby Trivigno	AHCA East First Team All-American	
Bobby Trivigno	Hockey East Player of the Year	
Bobby Trivigno	Hockey East Scoring Champion	
Massachusetts	Charlie Holt Team Sportsmanship Award	
Bobby Trivigno	William Flynn Tournament Most Valuable Player	
Scott Morrow	Hockey East First Team	
Bobby Trivigno	Hockey East First Team	
Matt Murray	Hockey East Third Team	
Matthew Kessel	Hockey East Third Team	
Ryan Ufko	Hockey East Rookie Team	
Matt Murray	Hockey East All-Tournament Team	
Colin Felix	Hockey East All-Tournament Team	
Garrett Wait	Hockey East All-Tournament Team	
Bobby Trivigno	Hockey East All-Tournament Team	

== Players drafted into the NHL ==
=== 2022 NHL entry draft ===
Round	Pick	Player	NHL team
4	103	Kenny Connors^{†}	Los Angeles Kings
4	114	Cole O'Hara^{†}	Nashville Predators
5	143	Cameron O'Neill^{†}	Ottawa Senators
7	206	Tyson Dyck^{†}	Ottawa Senators

† incoming freshman
