= 2021–22 UMass Lowell River Hawks men's ice hockey season =

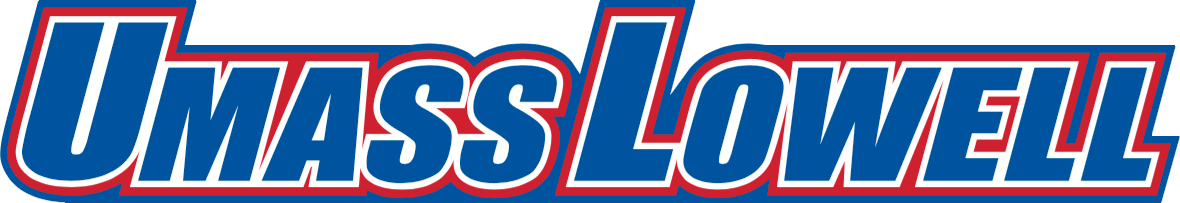

NCAA Tournament, West Regional semifinal
- Conference: T–2nd Hockey East
- Home ice: Tsongas Center

Rankings
- USCHO: #12
- USA Today: #13

Record
- Overall: 21–11–3
- Conference: 15–8–1
- Home: 13–3–3
- Road: 8–6–0
- Neutral: 0–2–0

Coaches and captains
- Head coach: Norm Bazin
- Assistant coaches: Andy Jones; Taylor Nelson; Tom Ford
- Captain: Lucas Condotta
- Alternate captain(s): Jon McDonald; Reid Stefanson

The 2021–22 UMass Lowell River Hawks Men's ice hockey season was the 55th season of play for the program, the 39th season competing at the Division I level, and the 38th season in the Hockey East conference. The River Hawks represented the University of Massachusetts Lowell and were coached by Norm Bazin, in his 11th season.

== Season ==
Lowell got off to a great start to their season, going nine consecutive games without a loss that included four wins against ranked teams. The primary reason for the early success was from the River Hawks' defense, particularly the stellar goaltending from Owen Savory. By the end of November, Savory was among the national leaders with 1.10 goals against average and 3 shutouts through just 9 games. The hot start earned Lowell its way into the national rankings and put them on the bubble of a potential NCAA bid.

The River Hawks had their first losing weekend of the season in early December, however, because it came against the defending national champions, they weren't harmed by the results too badly. The team responded by winning each of their next five games despite taking over a month to complete that stretch. Their lofty win total put UMass Lowell into the top 10 in late January and had them on the cusp of being a shoe-in for the national tournament. Unfortunately, the River Hawks' lack of offense began to catch up with them in the second half of the season.

Over a period of about a month, from late-January to late-February, Lowell went 4–6. The team could manage more than 3 goals in just one of those games and that came against Dartmouth, one of the worst teams in the nation. The defense performed well but not nearly as stout as they had in the first half of the year. The only saving grace for the Hawks was that most of the losses were to ranked teams and did not send them plummeting down the PairWise rankings. Lowell recovered at the end of the regular season, sweeping their weekend finale and lifting themselves back into the #15 spot where they at least had a chance to make a tournament bid.

=== Postseason ===
For finishing 2nd (tied) in the conference standings, Lowell received a bye into the quarterfinals and were set against a fairly surprising Merrimack squad. The Hawks ended up producing their best offensive effort of the season and trounced the Warriors 7–2. The win pushed the team two spots higher in the rankings and gave them a more comfortable position for a tournament bid. In the semifinal round, Lowell faced off against Massachusetts. A win would not only send them to the conference championship but would likely guarantee the Hawks a tournament bid. The defense was again a strength, limiting the Minutemen to just 19 shots, but Lowell could not get on track offensively and ended up losing 1–3. Fortunately, because several underdog teams lost in the semifinal round, Lowel's position as the #13 team was assured an appearance in the NCAA tournament.

The River Hawks played in their first tournament in five years and opened against Denver, the #3 overall seed. Lucas Condotta got the Hawks on the board first and the team seemed to carry the balance of play, though they couldn't stop the Pioneers from tying the game near the end of the period. Lowell managed to kill of three separate penalties in the middle frame, a solid achievement against one of the strongest power plays in the nation. All that work, however, kept the Hawks on the defensive and Denver pressed Savory hard. Mid-way through the third, they finally got their first lead of the game on a shot from Carter Savoie. The River Hawks didn't surrender and immediately set about tying the game once more. In less than five minutes, Connor Sodergren netted the River Hawks' second goal and gave hope that Lowell could pull off the upset in front of the partisan crowd. With just under three minutes to play, Cameron Wright deflected a puck out of mid-air through Savory and took all the momentum away from the Hawks. In spite of a furious charge to get a third goal, Lowell ran out of time and their season came to a close.

== Departures ==
Player	Position	Nationality	Cause
Seth Barton	Defenseman	Canada	Signed professional contract (Detroit Red Wings)
Anthony Baxter	Forward	United States	Graduate transfer to Rensselaer
Chase Blackmun	Defenseman	United States	Transferred to Notre Dame
Matt Brown	Forward	United States	Transferred to Boston University
Charles Levesque	Forward	Canada	Graduation (signed with Hockey Club de Cergy-Pontoise)
Benjamin McEvoy	Goaltender	United States	Left program (retired)
Logan Neaton	Goaltender	United States	Transferred to Miami
Austin O'Rourke	Forward	United States	Left program (retired)
Theodor Pištěk	Forward	Czech Republic	Left mid-season (signed with Kristianstads IK)
Dominick Procopio	Defenseman	United States	Signed professional contract (Huntsville Havoc)
Nolan Sawchuk	Defenseman	United States	Transferred to St. Thomas

== Recruiting ==
Player	Position	Nationality	Age	Notes
Nick Austin	Defenseman	United States	23	St. Louis Park, MN; graduate transfer from Colgate
Gabe Blanchard	Defenseman	United States	21	East Aurora, NY
Ryan Brushett	Forward	Canada	23	Verdun, QC; transfer from Omaha
Owen Cole	Forward	Canada	21	Dunnville, ON
Matt Crasa	Forward	United States	20	New York, NY
Isac Jonsson	Defenseman	Sweden	21	Ängelholm, SWE
Edvard Nordlund	Goaltender	Sweden	20	Stockholm, SWE
Stefan Owens	Forward	United States	21	Midlothian, VA
Theo Pištěk	Forward	Czech Republic	20	Tabor, CZE

== Roster ==
As of August 12, 2021.

No.	Nat.	Player	Class	Pos	Height	Weight	DoB	Hometown	Previous team	NHL rights
1	(Sweden)	Edvard Nordlund	Freshman	G	6' 2" (1.88 m)	176 lb (80 kg)	2001-07-12	Nacka, Sweden	Danbury Jr. Hat Tricks (NAHL)	—
4	(United States)	Sam Knoblauch	Senior	F	6' 1" (1.85 m)	195 lb (88 kg)	1998-02-15	Rochester, Michigan	Carleton Place Canadians (CCHL)	—
5	(Canada)	Owen Cole	Freshman	F	5' 10" (1.78 m)	173 lb (78 kg)	2000-01-29	Dunnville, Ontario	Brooks Bandits (AJHL)	—
6	(Sweden)	Isac Jonsson	Freshman	D	5' 10" (1.78 m)	173 lb (78 kg)	2000-10-08	Ängelholm, Sweden	Tri-City Storm (USHL)	—
7	(Canada)	Jordan Schulting	Junior	D	6' 2" (1.88 m)	190 lb (86 kg)	1999-08-06	Penticton, British Columbia	Coquitlam Express (BCHL)	—
8	(Germany)	Nik Armstrong-Kingkade	Sophomore	F	5' 9" (1.75 m)	185 lb (84 kg)	1999-05-01	Manheim, Germany	Minot Minotauros (NAHL)	—
9	(Canada)	Reid Stefanson (A)	Senior	F	6' 0" (1.83 m)	185 lb (84 kg)	1997-02-20	Winnipeg, Manitoba	Sioux Falls Stampede (USHL)	—
10	(United States)	Brehdan Engum	Sophomore	D	6' 2" (1.88 m)	215 lb (98 kg)	2000-08-10	Burnsville, Minnesota	Waterloo Black Hawks (USHL)	—
11	(United States)	Jon McDonald (A)	Senior	D	6' 0" (1.83 m)	180 lb (82 kg)	1998-06-15	Livonia, Michigan	Fargo Force (USHL)	—
12	(United States)	Nick Austin	Graduate	D	5' 11" (1.8 m)	190 lb (86 kg)	1997-11-17	St. Louis Park, Minnesota	Colgate (ECAC)	—
13	(Canada)	Matt Kinash	Sophomore	F	6' 0" (1.83 m)	185 lb (84 kg)	1999-12-15	Edmonton, Alberta	Drayton Valley Thunder (AJHL)	—
14	(United States)	Ben Meehan	Sophomore	D	6' 0" (1.83 m)	190 lb (86 kg)	2001-04-20	Walpole, Massachusetts	Cedar Rapids RoughRiders (USHL)	LAK, 140th overall 2020
15	(United States)	Jackson Sterrett	Sophomore	F	5' 11" (1.8 m)	183 lb (83 kg)	1999-06-24	Hendersonville, Tennessee	Maryland Black Bears (NAHL)	—
16	(United States)	Gabe Blanchard	Freshman	D	6' 0" (1.83 m)	195 lb (88 kg)	2000-09-15	East Aurora, New York	Sioux City Musketeers (USHL)	—
17	(Slovakia)	Marek Korenčík	Junior	D	6' 3" (1.91 m)	200 lb (91 kg)	1999-07-19	Žilina, Slovakia	Luleå J20 (J20 SuperElit)	—
18	(Sweden)	Carl Berglund	Sophomore	F	6' 2" (1.88 m)	195 lb (88 kg)	2000-01-16	Hammarö, Sweden	Sioux Falls Stampede (USHL)	—
19	(Canada)	Josh Latta	Junior	F	5' 11" (1.8 m)	180 lb (82 kg)	1998-08-14	West Vancouver, British Columbia	Alabama Huntsville (WCHA)	—
20	(United States)	Matt Allen	Sophomore	F	5' 10" (1.78 m)	168 lb (76 kg)	2000-05-13	Minco, Oklahoma	Amarillo Bulls (NAHL)	—
21	(United States)	Brian Chambers	Junior	F	6' 1" (1.85 m)	180 lb (82 kg)	1998-07-24	Weymouth, Massachusetts	Sioux Falls Stampede (USHL)	—
22	(Canada)	Blake Wells	Junior	F	6' 2" (1.88 m)	200 lb (91 kg)	1999-08-02	Blackie, Alberta	Okotoks Oilers (AJHL)	—
23	(Canada)	Zach Kaiser	Junior	F	6' 1" (1.85 m)	180 lb (82 kg)	1998-09-06	Orangeville, Ontario	Sherwood Park Crusaders (AJHL)	—
24	(Canada)	Lucas Condotta (C)	Senior	F	6' 2" (1.88 m)	209 lb (95 kg)	1997-11-06	Georgetown, Ontario	Markham Royals (OJHL)	—
25	(United States)	Matt Crasa	Freshman	F	5' 11" (1.8 m)	185 lb (84 kg)	2001-03-04	South Setauket, New York	Fargo Force (USHL)	—
26	(Sweden)	Andre Lee	Junior	F	6' 4" (1.93 m)	205 lb (93 kg)	2000-07-26	Karlstad, Sweden	Sioux Falls Stampede (USHL)	LAK, 188th overall 2019
27	(United States)	Stefan Owens	Freshman	F	5' 10" (1.78 m)	169 lb (77 kg)	2000-04-24	Midlothian, Virginia	Maine Nordiques (NAHL)	—
28	(United States)	Connor Sodergren	Graduate	F	5' 11" (1.8 m)	190 lb (86 kg)	1996-09-11	Tewksbury, Massachusetts	West Kelowna Warriors (BCHL)	—
29	(Canada)	Ryan Brushett	Junior	F	6' 0" (1.83 m)	185 lb (84 kg)	1998-06-14	Montreal, Quebec	Omaha (NCHC)	—
31	(Canada)	Owen Savory	Senior	G	6' 0" (1.83 m)	185 lb (84 kg)	1997-10-11	Cambridge, Ontario	Rensselaer (ECAC)	—
33	(United States)	Henry Welsch	Sophomore	G	6' 2" (1.88 m)	195 lb (88 kg)	2000-11-17	Lakeville, Minnesota	Aberdeen Wings (NAHL)	—
34	(Czech Republic)	Theo Pištěk	Freshman	F	6' 0" (1.83 m)	187 lb (85 kg)	2001-06-26	Tábor, Czech Republic	Örebro J20 (J20 Nationell)	—

== Standings ==
2021–22 Hockey East Standings
	Conference record										Overall record					
	GP	W	L	T	OTW	OTL	SOW	PTS	GF	GA	GP	W	L	T	GF	GA
#12 Northeastern †	24	15	8	1	1	1	1	47	68	46	39	25	13	1	99	68
#10 Massachusetts *	24	14	8	2	2	3	1	46	77	54	37	22	13	2	117	88
#13 Massachusetts Lowell	24	15	8	1	1	0	1	46	62	48	35	21	11	3	102	74
#19 Connecticut	24	14	10	0	2	1	0	41	73	61	36	20	16	0	109	89
Boston University	24	13	8	3	3	2	0	41	69	58	35	19	13	3	107	89
Merrimack	24	13	11	0	1	3	0	41	70	70	35	19	15	1	109	99
#20 Providence	24	12	11	1	1	1	1	38	61	52	38	22	14	2	118	82
Boston College	24	9	12	3	0	1	1	32	67	77	38	15	18	5	114	123
New Hampshire	24	8	15	1	2	2	0	25	47	71	34	14	19	1	76	95
Vermont	24	6	16	2	3	1	2	20	41	72	35	8	25	2	59	101
Maine	24	5	17	2	2	3	1	19	54	80	33	7	22	4	74	111
Championship: March 19, 2022 † indicates regular season champion * indicates conference tournament champion (Lamoriello Trophy); Rankings: USCHO.com Top 20 Poll

== Schedule and results ==
Date	Time	Opponent^{#}	Rank^{#}	Site	TV	Decision	Result	Attendance	Record
Regular season
October 2	9:05 PM	at Arizona State*		Oceanside Ice Arena • Tempe, Arizona		Welsch	L 3–5	790	0–1–0
October 3	6:05 PM	at Arizona State*		Oceanside Ice Arena • Tempe, Arizona		Savory	W 4–2	814	1–1–0
October 22	7:15 PM	Michigan State*		Tsongas Center • Lowell, Massachusetts		Savory	T 2–2 ^{OT}	4,658	1–1–1
October 23	6:05 PM	Michigan State*		Tsongas Center • Lowell, Massachusetts		Welsch	W 4–0	3,468	2–1–1
October 29	7:30 PM	at #19 Boston University		Agganis Arena • Boston, Massachusetts		Savory	W 3–0	2,941	3–1–1 (1–0–0)
October 30	7:30 PM	#19 Boston University		Tsongas Center • Lowell, Massachusetts		Savory	W 2–1	4,363	4–1–1 (2–0–0)
November 3	7:15 PM	Long Island*	#19	Tsongas Center • Lowell, Massachusetts		Welsch	T 3–3 ^{OT}	2,633	4–1–2
November 12	7:15 PM	#17 Northeastern	#20	Tsongas Center • Lowell, Massachusetts	NESN+	Savory	W 2–1 ^{OT}	4,986	5–1–2 (3–0–0)
November 13	6:05 PM	#16 Boston College	#20	Tsongas Center • Lowell, Massachusetts		Savory	W 4–2	5,215	6–1–2 (4–0–0)
November 20	6:05 PM	Connecticut	#15	Tsongas Center • Lowell, Massachusetts	NESN	Savory	W 3–0	5,025	7–1–2 (5–0–0)
November 21	3:35 PM	at Connecticut	#15	XL Center • Hartford, Connecticut		Savory	L 1–2	3,066	7–2–2 (5–1–0)
November 27	5:00 PM	vs. Maine	#15	Cross Insurance Arena • Portland, Maine		Savory	W 2–0	4,176	8–2–2 (6–1–0)
December 3	7:15 PM	#14 Massachusetts	#15	Tsongas Center • Lowell, Massachusetts	NESN	Savory	T 4–4 ^{SOW}	6,289	8–2–3 (6–1–1)
December 4	7:00 PM	at #14 Massachusetts	#15	Mullins Center • Amherst, Massachusetts		Welsch	L 2–3	5,423	8–3–3 (6–2–1)
December 10	7:05 PM	at Vermont	#15	Gutterson Fieldhouse • Burlington, Vermont		Savory	W 3–0	2,796	9–3–3 (7–2–1)
December 11	7;05 PM	at Vermont	#15	Gutterson Fieldhouse • Burlington, Vermont		Savory	W 2–1	2,862	10–3–3 (8–2–1)
December 29	7:00 PM	at St. Lawrence*	#15	Appleton Arena • Canton, New York		Savory	W 3–2	727	11–3–3
January 14	7:15 PM	Maine	#12	Tsongas Center • Lowell, Massachusetts		Savory	W 5–3	4,217	12–3–3 (9–2–1)
January 15	6:05 PM	Maine	#12	Tsongas Center • Lowell, Massachusetts	NESN	Savory	W 4–3	3,013	13–3–3 (10–2–1)
January 21	7:00 PM	at Merrimack	#10	J. Thom Lawler Rink • North Andover, Massachusetts		Savory	L 1–3	2,471	13–4–3 (10–3–1)
January 22	6:05 PM	Merrimack	#10	Tsongas Center • Lowell, Massachusetts		Welsch	L 2–3	5,471	13–5–3 (10–4–1)
January 28	7:35 PM	at #15 Northeastern	#14	Matthews Arena • Boston, Massachusetts		Savory	W 2–1	2,722	14–5–3 (11–4–1)
January 30	1:05 PM	#9 Massachusetts	#14	Tsongas Center • Lowell, Massachusetts		Savory	L 3–4	3,745	14–6–3 (11–5–1)
February 4	7:00 PM	at Boston College	#14	Conte Forum • Chestnut Hill, Massachusetts		Savory	W 3–2	3,843	15–6–3 (12–5–1)
February 5	7:05 PM	Dartmouth*	#14	Tsongas Center • Lowell, Massachusetts	NESN+	Savory	W 6–3	4,375	16–6–3
February 11	7:15 PM	#15 Northeastern	#13	Tsongas Center • Lowell, Massachusetts		Savory	L 2–4	4,344	16–7–3 (12–6–1)
February 13	2:05 PM	at New Hampshire	#13	Whittemore Center • Durham, New Hampshire		Welsch	L 0–3	3,870	16–8–3 (12–7–1)
February 18	7:15 PM	#19 Providence	#16	Tsongas Center • Lowell, Massachusetts		Savory	W 3–2	4,243	17–8–3 (13–7–1)
February 19	7:00 PM	at #19 Providence	#16	Schneider Arena • Providence, Rhode Island		Savory	L 2–3	2,453	17–9–3 (13–8–1)
February 25	7:15 PM	Long Island*	#16	Tsongas Center • Lowell, Massachusetts		Savory	W 5–1	3,512	18–9–3
March 4	7:05 PM	at New Hampshire	#16	Whittemore Center • Durham, New Hampshire		Savory	W 6–3	6,003	19–9–3 (14–8–1)
March 5	6:05 PM	New Hampshire	#16	Tsongas Center • Lowell, Massachusetts		Savory	W 1–0	6,234	20–9–3 (15–8–1)
Hockey East Tournament
March 12	7:00 PM	Merrimack*	#14	Tsongas Center • Lowell, Massachusetts (Quarterfinal)		Savory	W 7–2	5,782	21–9–3
March 18	7:30 PM	vs. #11 Massachusetts*	#13	TD Garden • Boston, Massachusetts (Semifinal)	NESN	Savory	L 1–3	13,106	21–10–3
NCAA Tournament
March 24	9:00 PM	vs. #3 Denver*	#13	Budweiser Events Center • Loveland, Colorado (West Regional semifinal)	ESPNU	Savory	L 2–3	3,138	21–11–3
*Non-conference game. ^{#}Rankings from USCHO.com Poll. All times are in Eastern Time. Source:

== Scoring statistics ==
Name	Position	Games	Goals	Assists	Points	PIM
Andre Lee	C/LW	34	16	12	28	50
Carl Berglund	C/RW	33	9	19	28	8
Lucas Condotta	LW	33	10	13	23	25
Ryan Brushett	C	35	8	14	22	4
Matthew Crasa	C/RW	35	12	9	21	12
Reid Stefanson	LW	34	8	12	20	8
Nicholas Austin	D	35	1	16	17	16
Connor Sodergren	F	35	7	8	15	24
Ben Meehan	D	33	5	9	14	54
Brian Chambers	RW	33	3	8	11	10
Owen Cole	C/LW	22	3	7	10	0
Jonathan McDonald	D	35	1	9	10	10
Isac Jonsson	D	33	0	10	10	4
Zach Kaiser	LW	33	4	5	9	12
Blake Wells	F	29	3	5	8	20
Brehdan Engum	D	32	2	6	8	39
Samuel Knoblauch	RW	19	0	7	7	2
Marek Korenčík	D	28	3	3	6	14
Nik Armstrong-Kingkade	F	27	4	1	5	8
Jordan Schulting	D	25	1	2	3	4
Matt Allen	F	3	1	0	1	0
Stefan Owens	F	13	1	0	1	0
Josh Latta	F	3	0	1	1	0
Owen Savory	G	29	0	1	1	2
Theodor Pistek	LW/RW	1	0	0	0	0
Jackson Sterrett	F	1	0	0	0	0
Edvard Nordlund	G	1	0	0	0	0
Henry Welsch	G	6	0	0	0	0
Gabriel Blanchard	D	19	0	0	0	6
Total			102	177	279	332

== Goaltending statistics ==
Name	Games	Minutes	Wins	Losses	Ties	Goals against	Saves	Shut outs	SV %	GAA
Owen Savory	29	1738	20	7	2	56	696	5	.926	1.93
Henry Welsch	6	361	1	4	1	16	134	1	.893	2.66
Empty Net	-	16	-	-	-	2	-	-	-	-
Total	35	2116	21	11	3	74	830	6	.918	2.10

== Rankings ==
Poll	Week																									
Poll	Pre	1	2	3	4	5	6	7	8	9	10	11	12	13	14	15	16	17	18	19	20	21	22	23	24	25 (Final)
USCHO.com	NR	NR	NR	NR	NR	19	20	15	15	15	15	15	12	12	10	14	14	13	16	16	16	14	13	13	-	12
USA Today	NR	NR	NR	NR	NR	NR	NR	NR	NR	15	15	14	12	12	9	14	15	13	NR	NR	NR	14	13	13	12	13

Note: USCHO did not release a poll in week 24.

== Awards and honors ==
Player	Award	Ref
Owen Savory	Hockey East Second Team	
Carl Berglund	Hockey East Third Team	
Andre Lee	Hockey East Third Team	
Matt Crasa	Hockey East Rookie Team	
