= 2021–22 Vermont Catamounts men's ice hockey season =

- Conference: 11th Hockey East
- Home ice: Gutterson Fieldhouse

Rankings
- USCHO: NR
- USA Today: NR

Record
- Overall: 8–25–2
- Conference: 6–16–2
- Home: 4–13–0
- Road: 4–12–2

Coaches and captains
- Head coach: Todd Woodcroft
- Assistant coaches: Steve Wiedler; Scott Moser; Drew Michals
- Captain: Andrew Lucas
- Alternate captain(s): Jacques Bouquot; William Lemay; Carter Long

The 2021–22 Vermont Catamounts men's ice hockey season was the 66th season of play for the program, the 49th at the Division I level, and the 17th season in the Hockey East conference. The Catamounts represented the University of Vermont and were coached by Todd Woodcroft, in his 2nd season.

== Season ==
After a mercifully abbreviated season the year before, Vermont's rebuild under Woodcroft continued with a slow start. The Catamounts' offense was woefully inadequate for most of the season with the team able to score more than 3 goals on only three occasions. Surprisingly, the first of those happened against #9 Boston College. While time would later diminish that achievement due to a poor season from the Eagles, it was still Vermont's first victory over their conference rivals in six years. Unfortunately, the Catamounts had to wait almost a month for their second win. It was only a winning weekend against Maine that kept Vermont out of the conference cellar, though only by a hair's breadth.

During the winter break, Dovar Tinling left the team and signed with the Des Moines Buccaneers. Because it was a junior club, Tinling remained eligible for Division I college hockey.

The Catamounts did only marginally better in the second half of the season, recording five more wins to bring their season's total up to eight. The defense played admirably in front of both Gabe Carriere and Tyler Harmon, limiting the opposition to less than 30 shots per game. The offense, however, didn't improve and neither goaltender received much help in that respect.

When Vermont entered the postseason, they were a severe underdog against Providence. Though they did well to keep the score close against the Friars, the Catamounts were more than doubled in shots and scored their only marker of the game on the power play after Carriere had been pulled for an extra attacker.

== Departures ==
Player	Position	Nationality	Cause
Matt Beck	Goaltender	United States	Graduation (retired)
Simon Boyko	Forward	Canada	Transferred to Aurora
Mickey Burns	Forward	United States	Transferred to Mercyhurst
Ace Cowans	Forward	United States	Graduation (signed with Kalix UHC)
Vladislav Dzhioshvili	Forward	Russia	Graduation (signed with HK 36 Skalica)
Alex Esposito	Forward	United States	Graduate transfer to Providence
Christian Evers	Defenseman	United States	Graduation (signed with Rapid City Rush)
Owen Grant	Defenseman	Canada	Graduation (retired)
Conner Hutchison	Defenseman	United States	Transferred to Sacred Heart
Jordan Kaplan	Forward	United States	Graduation (signed with Utica Comets)
Bryce Misley	Forward	Canada	Graduation (signed with Iowa Wild)
Tristan Mullin	Forward	Canada	Graduation (signed with Cleveland Monsters)
Whim Stålberg	Forward	Sweden	Transferred to Plymouth State
Cory Thomas	Defenseman	Canada	Graduate transfer to Canisius
Dovar Tinling	Forward	Canada	Returned to juniors mid-season (Des Moines Buccaneers)

== Recruiting ==
Player	Position	Nationality	Age	Notes
Cory Babichuk	Defenseman	Canada	23	Edmonton, AB; transfer from Rensselaer
Andrei Buyalsky	Forward	Kazakhstan	21	Karaganda, KAZ; selected 92nd overall in 2021
Cole Hudson	Goaltender	United States	21	Tonawanda, NY
Simon Jellúš	Forward	Slovakia	20	Ilava, SVK
Philip Lagunov	Forward	Canada	22	Hamilton, ON; graduate transfer from Massachusetts
Joe Leahy	Defenseman	Canada	24	Waterloo, ON; transfer from Cornell
Joel Määttä	Forward	Finland	19	Helsinki, FIN
Luke Mountain	Forward	United States	21	Woodbury, MN
Luca Münzenberger	Defenseman	Germany	18	Düsseldorf, GER; selected 90th overall in 2021
Porter Schachle	Forward	United States	20	Wasilla, AK
Timofei Spitserov	Forward	Russia	19	St. Petersburg, RUS
Robbie Stucker	Defenseman	United States	23	Saint Paul, MN; transfer from Minnesota; selected 210th overall in 2017
Jesper Tarkiainen	Forward	Finland	20	Naperville, IL
Isak Walther	Forward	Sweden	20	Södertälje, SWE; selected 179th overall in 2019

== Roster ==
As of September 28, 2021.

No.	Nat.	Player	Class	Pos	Height	Weight	DoB	Hometown	Previous team	NHL rights
1	(United States)	Tyler Harmon	Graduate	G	6' 2" (1.88 m)	205 lb (93 kg)	1997-10-17	Ramsey, New Jersey	Jersey Hitmen (NCDC)	—
2	(United States)	Carter Long (A)	Senior	D	6' 3" (1.91 m)	220 lb (100 kg)	1998-02-13	Yorktown, Virginia	Lincoln Stars (USHL)	—
3	(United States)	Andrew Petrillo	Senior	D	5' 10" (1.78 m)	190 lb (86 kg)	1998-03-12	Pompton Plains, New Jersey	Central Illinois Flying Aces (USHL)	—
4	(Canada)	William Lemay (A)	Junior	F	5' 10" (1.78 m)	185 lb (84 kg)	1998-12-28	Marieville, Quebec	Brooks Bandits (AJHL)	—
5	(Canada)	Joe Leahy	Senior	D	6' 4" (1.93 m)	198 lb (90 kg)	1997-04-29	Waterloo, Ontario	Cornell (ECAC)	—
6	(United States)	Andrew Lucas (C)	Junior	D	5' 11" (1.8 m)	160 lb (73 kg)	1999-02-05	Alexandria, Virginia	Brooks Bandits (AJHL)	—
7	(United States)	Robbie Stucker	Senior	D	6' 3" (1.91 m)	180 lb (82 kg)	1998-09-30	St. Paul, Minnesota	Minnesota (Big Ten)	CBJ, 210th overall 2017
9	(Finland)	Joel Määttä	Freshman	F	6' 2" (1.88 m)	202 lb (92 kg)	2002-07-06	Helsinki, Finland	Sioux City Musketeers (USHL)	—
10	(United States)	Luke Mountain	Freshman	F	6' 1" (1.85 m)	188 lb (85 kg)	2000-02-25	Woodbury, Minnesota	Maryland Black Bears (NAHL)	—
11	(United States)	Porter Schachle	Freshman	F	6' 4" (1.93 m)	194 lb (88 kg)	2000-11-22	Wasilla, Alaska	Danbury Jr. Hat Tricks (NAHL)	—
12	(Canada)	Nic Hamre	Senior	F	5' 8" (1.73 m)	180 lb (82 kg)	1997-04-25	Cumberland, Ontario	Brooks Bandits (AJHL)	—
13	(Canada)	Philip Lagunov	Senior	F	6' 0" (1.83 m)	193 lb (88 kg)	1998-11-22	Hamilton, Ontario	Massachusetts (HEA)	—
14	(Kazakhstan)	Andrei Buyalsky	Freshman	F	6' 3" (1.91 m)	179 lb (81 kg)	2000-08-18	Karaganda, Kazakhstan	Dubuque Fighting Saints (USHL)	COL, 92nd overall 2021
15	(Germany)	Luca Münzenberger	Freshman	D	6' 2" (1.88 m)	200 lb (91 kg)	2002-11-24	Düsseldorf, Germany	Kölner Haie U20 (DNL)	EDM, 90th overall 2021
16	(Canada)	Will Zapernick	Sophomore	F	5' 9" (1.75 m)	180 lb (82 kg)	1999-11-16	Edmonton, Alberta	Sherwood Park Crusaders (AJHL)	—
17	(United States)	Jacques Bouquot (A)	Junior	F	6' 0" (1.83 m)	180 lb (82 kg)	2000-02-10	South Windsor, Connecticut	Chilliwack Chiefs (BCHL)	—
18	(Canada)	Azzaro Tinling	Sophomore	F	6' 1" (1.85 m)	220 lb (100 kg)	1999-12-20	Pointe-Claire, Quebec	Hawkesbury Hawks (CCHL)	—
19	(Slovakia)	Simon Jellúš	Freshman	F	6' 2" (1.88 m)	202 lb (92 kg)	2001-01-18	Ilava, Slovakia	Karlskrona J20 (J20 Nationell)	—
20	(United States)	Jesper Tarkiainen	Freshman	F	6' 0" (1.83 m)	188 lb (85 kg)	2001-10-02	Naperville, Illinois	Jokerit U20 (U20 SM-sarja)	—
22	(Sweden)	Isak Walther	Freshman	F	6' 3" (1.91 m)	179 lb (81 kg)	2001-08-02	Södertälje, Sweden	Södertälje J20 (J20 Nationell)	NSH, 179th overall 2019
23	(Canada)	Noah Jordan	Senior	F	6' 5" (1.96 m)	215 lb (98 kg)	1997-03-08	Toronto, Ontario	Miami (NCHC)	—
24	(United States)	Brian Kelly	Graduate	D	6' 0" (1.83 m)	808 lb (367 kg)	1997-12-24	Purchase, New York	Connecticut Jr. Rangers (NCDC)	—
25	(Canada)	Dovar Tinling	Sophomore	F	5' 11" (1.8 m)	185 lb (84 kg)	2003-03-03	Pointe-Claire, Quebec	Hawkesbury Hawks (CCHL)	—
26	(Latvia)	Ray Vītoliņš	Sophomore	F	6' 0" (1.83 m)	180 lb (82 kg)	2002-01-12	Ogre, Latvia	Sioux Falls Stampede (USHL)	—
27	(Canada)	Cody Schiavon	Sophomore	D	6' 0" (1.83 m)	201 lb (91 kg)	2000-07-01	West Kelowna, British Columbia	Trail Smoke Eaters (BCHL)	—
29	(Canada)	Dallas Comeau	Senior	F	5' 10" (1.78 m)	180 lb (82 kg)	1997-09-19	Calgary, Alberta	Grande Prairie Storm (AJHL)	—
30	(United States)	Cole Hudson	Freshman	G	6' 1" (1.85 m)	161 lb (73 kg)	2000-03-13	Tonawanda, New York	Shreveport Mudbugs (NAHL)	—
32	(Canada)	Cory Babichuk	Sophomore	D	5' 10" (1.78 m)	160 lb (73 kg)	1998-09-28	Edmonton, Alberta	Rensselaer (ECAC)	—
34	(Russia)	Timofei Spitserov	Freshman	G	6' 0" (1.83 m)	176 lb (80 kg)	2002-03-26	St. Petersburg, Russia	Culver Academies (Midget AAA)	SJS, 210th overall 2020
35	(Canada)	Gabe Carriere	Sophomore	G	6' 2" (1.88 m)	185 lb (84 kg)	2000-11-05	Ottawa, Ontario	Waterloo Black Hawks (USHL)	—

== Standings ==
2021–22 Hockey East Standings
	Conference record										Overall record					
	GP	W	L	T	OTW	OTL	SOW	PTS	GF	GA	GP	W	L	T	GF	GA
#12 Northeastern †	24	15	8	1	1	1	1	47	68	46	39	25	13	1	99	68
#10 Massachusetts *	24	14	8	2	2	3	1	46	77	54	37	22	13	2	117	88
#13 Massachusetts Lowell	24	15	8	1	1	0	1	46	62	48	35	21	11	3	102	74
#19 Connecticut	24	14	10	0	2	1	0	41	73	61	36	20	16	0	109	89
Boston University	24	13	8	3	3	2	0	41	69	58	35	19	13	3	107	89
Merrimack	24	13	11	0	1	3	0	41	70	70	35	19	15	1	109	99
#20 Providence	24	12	11	1	1	1	1	38	61	52	38	22	14	2	118	82
Boston College	24	9	12	3	0	1	1	32	67	77	38	15	18	5	114	123
New Hampshire	24	8	15	1	2	2	0	25	47	71	34	14	19	1	76	95
Vermont	24	6	16	2	3	1	2	20	41	72	35	8	25	2	59	101
Maine	24	5	17	2	2	3	1	19	54	80	33	7	22	4	74	111
Championship: March 19, 2022 † indicates regular season champion * indicates conference tournament champion (Lamoriello Trophy); Rankings: USCHO.com Top 20 Poll

== Schedule and results ==
Date	Time	Opponent^{#}	Rank^{#}	Site	TV	Decision	Result	Attendance	Record
Exhibition
October 2	7:35 PM	Mercyhurst*		Gutterson Fieldhouse • Burlington, Vermont (Exhibition)			W 4–2	0	
Regular Season
October 8	7:00 PM	Colgate*		Gutterson Fieldhouse • Burlington, Vermont		Carriere	L 3–5	2,705	0–1–0
October 9	7:00 PM	Colgate*		Gutterson Fieldhouse • Burlington, Vermont		Harmon	L 1–2	2,728	0–2–0
October 16	7:00 PM	#8 Quinnipiac*		Gutterson Fieldhouse • Burlington, Vermont		Harmon	L 0–2	3,037	0–3–0
October 23	7:00 PM	Rensselaer*		Gutterson Fieldhouse • Burlington, Vermont		Harmon	L 1–2	2,882	0–4–0
October 29	7:05 PM	#9 Boston College		Gutterson Fieldhouse • Burlington, Vermont		Carriere	W 5–4 ^{OT}	2,770	1–4–0 (1–0–0)
October 30	7:05 PM	#9 Boston College		Gutterson Fieldhouse • Burlington, Vermont		Harmon	L 2–3	2,928	1–5–0 (1–1–0)
November 12	7:00 PM	at New Hampshire		Whittemore Center • Durham, New Hampshire	NESN	Harmon	L 1–2	3,537	1–6–0 (1–2–0)
November 13	7:00 PM	at New Hampshire		Whittemore Center • Durham, New Hampshire		Carriere	T 3–3 ^{SOW}	3,606	1–6–1 (1–2–1)
November 19	7:35 PM	#12 Providence		Gutterson Fieldhouse • Burlington, Vermont		Harmon	L 3–4	2,421	1–7–1 (1–3–1)
November 20	7:05 PM	#12 Providence		Gutterson Fieldhouse • Burlington, Vermont		Carriere	L 0–2	2,421	1–8–1 (1–4–1)
November 24	7:00 PM	at Yale*		Ingalls Rink • New Haven, Connecticut		Carriere	L 2–4	1,100	1–9–1
November 28	4:00 PM	at Dartmouth*		Thompson Arena • Hanover, New Hampshire	NESN+	Carriere	W 3–2	1,551	2–9–1
December 3	7:30 PM	at Maine		Alfond Arena • Orono, Maine	NESN+	Carriere	W 1–0	3,059	3–9–1 (2–4–1)
December 4	7:00 PM	at Maine		Alfond Arena • Orono, Maine		Carriere	T 1–1 ^{SOW}	3,435	3–9–2 (2–4–2)
December 10	7:05 PM	#15 Massachusetts Lowell		Gutterson Fieldhouse • Burlington, Vermont		Carriere	L 0–3	2,796	3–10–2 (2–5–2)
December 11	7:05 PM	#15 Massachusetts Lowell		Gutterson Fieldhouse • Burlington, Vermont		Harmon	L 1–2	2,862	3–11–2 (2–6–2)
December 30	2:00 PM	at Rensselaer*		Houston Field House • Troy, New York		Carriere	L 2–3	2,195	3–12–2
January 4	7:05 PM	at Holy Cross*		Hart Center • Worcester, Massachusetts		Harmon	L 3–4	483	3–13–2
January 18	5:30 PM	at #12 Northeastern		Gutterson Fieldhouse • Burlington, Vermont		Carriere	L 0–4	2,307	3–14–2 (2–7–2)
January 21	7:00 PM	at Boston University		Agganis Arena • Boston, Massachusetts	NESN+	Carriere	W 2–1 ^{OT}	3,191	4–14–2 (3–7–2)
January 22	4:00 PM	at Boston University		Agganis Arena • Boston, Massachusetts		Carriere	L 0–4	3,294	4–15–2 (3–8–2)
January 28	7:05 PM	Alaska*		Gutterson Fieldhouse • Burlington, Vermont		Carriere	W 2–0	2,810	5–15–2
January 29	7:05 PM	Alaska*		Gutterson Fieldhouse • Burlington, Vermont		Carriere	L 0–3	2,827	5–16–2
February 4	7:00 PM	at #16 Northeastern		Matthews Arena • Boston, Massachusetts	NESN	Carriere	L 4–5	1,339	5–17–2 (3–9–2)
February 5	7:00 PM	at #17 Providence		Schneider Arena • Providence, Rhode Island	NESN	Harmon	L 1–4	2,834	5–18–2 (3–10–2)
February 11	7:00 PM	New Hampshire		Gutterson Fieldhouse • Burlington, Vermont		Harmon	W 3–0	2,672	6–18–2 (4–10–2)
February 13	1:00 PM	Merrimack		Gutterson Fieldhouse • Burlington, Vermont		Harmon	L 1–4	2,158	6–19–2 (4–11–2)
February 18	7:00 PM	at Merrimack		J. Thom Lawler Rink • North Andover, Massachusetts		Carriere	L 2–3	1,873	6–20–2 (4–12–2)
February 19	7:30 PM	at Merrimack		J. Thom Lawler Rink • North Andover, Massachusetts		Carriere	L 2–3	1,689	6–21–2 (4–13–2)
February 25	7:00 PM	#10 Massachusetts		Gutterson Fieldhouse • Burlington, Vermont		Carriere	L 1–5	2,304	6–22–2 (4–14–2)
February 26	7:00 PM	#10 Massachusetts		Gutterson Fieldhouse • Burlington, Vermont		Carriere	L 2–8	2,380	6–23–2 (4–15–2)
March 1	5:30 PM	at #13 Northeastern		Gutterson Fieldhouse • Burlington, Vermont		Harmon	W 1–0	2,295	7–23–2 (5–15–2)
March 4	7:05 PM	at Connecticut		XL Center • Hartford, Connecticut		Harmon	W 5–3	3,157	8–23–2 (6–15–2)
March 5	3:05 PM	at Connecticut		XL Center • Hartford, Connecticut		Carriere	L 0–4	3,182	8–24–2 (6–16–2)
Hockey East Tournament
March 10	7:00 PM	at #20 Providence*		Schneider Arena • Providence, Rhode Island (Opening Round)	NESN	Carriere	L 1–2	1,095	8–25–2
*Non-conference game. ^{#}Rankings from USCHO.com Poll. All times are in Eastern Time. Source:

== Scoring statistics ==
Name	Position	Games	Goals	Assists	Points	PIM
Philip Lagunov	C	35	8	8	16	10
Jacques Bouquot	C/LW	35	6	9	15	12
Robbie Stucker	D	34	4	10	14	12
Andrew Lucas	D/F	34	3	10	13	8
William Lemay	F	35	5	7	12	2
Will Zapernick	C/RW	32	5	6	11	12
Simon Jellus	C/LW	32	5	5	10	14
Joseph Leahy	D	27	2	8	10	12
Cory Babichuk	D	22	1	8	9	25
Isak Walther	C/W	35	3	5	8	6
Carter Long	D	29	3	4	7	8
Porter Schachle	F	27	3	3	6	14
Joel Määttä	C	32	3	3	6	16
Raimonds Vitolins	F	32	2	4	6	23
Cody Schiavon	D	27	0	4	4	2
Timofey Spitserov	RW	22	2	1	3	4
Dallas Comeau	F	21	1	2	3	2
Luca Münzenberger	D	32	0	3	3	45
Nic Hamre	LW	31	1	1	2	4
Luke Mountain	F	16	0	2	2	8
Dovar Tinling	C//LW	14	1	0	1	4
Jesper Tarkiainen	RW	19	1	0	1	0
Noah Jordan	RW	13	0	1	1	0
Cole Hudson	G	2	0	0	0	0
Andrei Buyalsky	C	3	0	0	0	4
Andrew Petrillo	D	9	0	0	0	2
Azzaro Tinling	RW	11	0	0	0	2
Tyler Harmon	G	16	0	0	0	2
Gabe Carriere	G	23	0	0	0	0
Total			58	102	160	251

== Goaltending statistics ==
Name	Games	Minutes	Wins	Losses	Ties	Goals against	Saves	Shut outs	SV %	GAA
Tyler Harmon	16	781	2	11	0	34	333	1	.903	2.61
Gabe Carriere	24	1251	6	14	2	60	572	3	.909	2.88
Cole Hudson	2	52	0	0	0	3	14	0	.905	3.47
Empty Net	-	36	-	-	-	4	-	-	-	-
Total	35	2121	8	25	2	101	919	4	.901	2.86

== Rankings ==
Poll	Week																									
Poll	Pre	1	2	3	4	5	6	7	8	9	10	11	12	13	14	15	16	17	18	19	20	21	22	23	24	25 (Final)
USCHO.com	NR	NR	NR	NR	NR	NR	NR	NR	NR	NR	NR	NR	NR	NR	NR	NR	NR	NR	NR	NR	NR	NR	NR	NR	-	NR
USA Today	NR	NR	NR	NR	NR	NR	NR	NR	NR	NR	NR	NR	NR	NR	NR	NR	NR	NR	NR	NR	NR	NR	NR	NR	NR	NR

Note: USCHO did not release a poll in week 24.

== Players drafted into the NHL ==
=== 2022 NHL entry draft ===
Round	Pick	Player	NHL team
5	133	Alex Bump^{†}	Philadelphia Flyers
7	195	Eli Barnett^{†}	San Jose Sharks
7	222	Joel Määttä	Edmonton Oilers

† incoming freshman
