= 2021–22 Merrimack Warriors men's ice hockey season =

- Conference: T–4th Hockey East
- Home ice: J. Thom Lawler Rink

Rankings
- USCHO: NR
- USA Today: NR

Record
- Overall: 19–15–1
- Conference: 13–11–0
- Home: 10–6–1
- Road: 9–9–0

Coaches and captains
- Head coach: Scott Borek
- Assistant coaches: Josh Ciocco; Dan Jewell; Chris Cowans
- Captain: Max Newton
- Alternate captain(s): Declan Carlile; Logan Drevitch; Liam Walsh

The 2021–22 Merrimack Warriors Men's ice hockey season was the 67th season of play for the program, the 33rd at the Division I level, and the 33rd season in the Hockey East conference. The Warriors represented Merrimack College and were coached by Scott Borek, in his 4th season.

== Season ==
Merrimack entered the season having posted losing records in each of the previous nine seasons. Early in the season it appeared that trend would continue when the Warriors lost four consecutive games and then turned to a freshman goaltender to try and salvage their season. Hugo Ollas had a bit of a rough go at first, but he helped stabilize the back end for Merrimack and enabled the team to play .500 hockey in November and December.

While their record was still under water, the team had a bigger problem to contend with after returning from the winter break. A pair of games against Clarkson and St. Lawrence were cancelled due to COVID-19. Bentley was swiftly added to the schedule and kicked off a 5-game winning streak that saw Merrimack score four victories over ranked teams.

The quality wins earned the Warriors the first appearance in the national rankings in years and made it possible for their supporters to hope for a tournament bid. Their time in the top 20 was short-lived and Merrick lost their very next game. The team flirted with the rankings for most of the remainder of the season, but sweep at the hands of Northeastern in the regular season finale ended any chance of an at-large bid.

Entering the postseason, Merrimack knew they would likely have to win the Hockey East championship in order to make the NCAA tournament. After a solid win over Maine in the opening round, the Warriors travelled to Lowell to take on the River Hawks. Despite outshooting their opponents, Ollas and Borgiel combined to allow 7 goals and the Warriors were drubbed out of contention. Regardless of the sour end, this was the most successful season for the program in a decade and was Scott Borek's best season behind the bench since 1997.

== Departures ==
Player	Position	Nationality	Cause
James Corcoran	Goaltender	United States	Transferred to University of New England
Dominic Dockery	Defenseman	United States	Graduate transfer to Maine
Chase Gresock	Forward	United States	Transferred to Miami
Tyler Heidt	Defenseman	Canada	Transferred to Regina
Patrick Holway	Defenseman	United States	Graduation (signed with Grand Rapids Griffins)
Jere Huhtamaa	Goaltender	Finland	Signed professional contract (TUTO Hockey)
Patrick Kramer	Forward	United States	Graduation (signed with South Carolina Stingrays)
Jakob Lee	Forward	Canada	Transferred to Rensselaer
Conor Lovett	Forward	United States	Returned to juniors (Cedar Rapids RoughRiders)
Jacob Modry	Defenseman	United States	Transferred to Plattsburgh State
Christian Simeone	Forward	United States	Signed professional contract (Utah Grizzlies)

== Recruiting ==
Player	Position	Nationality	Age	Notes
Adam Arvedson	Defenseman	Sweden	20	Karlstad, SWE
Colby Bukes	Defenseman	United States	22	Littleton, CO; transfer from Minnesota State
Matt Copponi	Forward	United States	18	Mansfield, MA
Jake Durflinger	Forward	United States	23	Walnut Creek, CA; graduate transfer from Denver
Christian Felton	Defenseman	United States	21	Medina, OH; transfer from Bentley
Mark Hillier	Forward	Canada	19	Labrador City, NL
Steven Jandric	Forward	Canada	24	Prince George, BC; graduate transfer from Denver
Devlin O'Brien	Forward	Canada	19	Palm Coast, FL
Hugo Ollas	Goaltender	Sweden	19	Linköping, SWE; selected 197th overall in 2020
Ivan Zivlak	Defenseman	Sweden	19	Gislaved, SWE

== Roster ==
As of August 24, 2021.

No.	Nat.	Player	Class	Pos	Height	Weight	DoB	Hometown	Previous team	NHL rights
1	(Sweden)	Hugo Ollas	Freshman	G	6' 8" (2.03 m)	238 lb (108 kg)	2002-04-24	Linköping, Sweden	Linköping J20 (J20 Nationell)	NYR, 197th overall 2020
2	(United States)	Christian Felton	Sophomore	D	6' 1" (1.85 m)	185 lb (84 kg)	2000-02-04	Medina, Ohio	Bentley (AHA)	—
3	(United States)	Declan Carlile (A)	Junior	D	6' 2" (1.88 m)	192 lb (87 kg)	2000-05-18	Hartland, Michigan	Muskegon (USHL)	—
4	(United States)	Mike Brown	Freshman	D	6' 2" (1.88 m)	209 lb (95 kg)	2001-04-03	Belmont, Massachusetts	Youngstown (USHL)	—
5	(United States)	Kevin Sadovski	Sophomore	D	6' 1" (1.85 m)	200 lb (91 kg)	1999-07-06	Palm Coast, Florida	Utica (NCDC)	—
6	(Canada)	Zach Vinnell	Junior	D	6' 1" (1.85 m)	185 lb (84 kg)	1998-04-03	Cochrane, Alberta	Camrose (AJHL)	—
7	(Canada)	Zach Uens	Junior	D	6' 1" (1.85 m)	195 lb (88 kg)	2001-05-13	Belleville, Ontario	Wellington (OJHL)	FLA, 105th overall 2020
8	(Canada)	Liam Dennison	Junior	D	5' 9" (1.75 m)	172 lb (78 kg)	1999-02-07	Manotick, Ontario	Youngstown (USHL)	—
9	(United States)	Liam Walsh (A)	Junior	F	6' 1" (1.85 m)	191 lb (87 kg)	1999-07-14	Bridgeville, Pennsylvania	Cedar Rapids (USHL)	—
10	(Canada)	Max Newton (C)	Graduate	F	5' 10" (1.78 m)	185 lb (84 kg)	1997-11-14	Vancouver, British Columbia	Alaska (WCHA)	—
11	(United States)	Mick Messner	Senior	F	5' 11" (1.8 m)	193 lb (88 kg)	1999-04-20	Madison, Wisconsin	Wisconsin (Big Ten)	—
12	(United States)	Jordan Seyfert	Senior	F	5' 10" (1.78 m)	179 lb (81 kg)	1999-04-03	Annville, Pennsylvania	Fargo (USHL)	—
13	(Canada)	Steven Jandric	Graduate	F	6' 0" (1.83 m)	200 lb (91 kg)	1997-08-18	Prince George, British Columbia	Denver (NCHC)	—
14	(United States)	Jake Durflinger	Graduate	F	5' 9" (1.75 m)	175 lb (79 kg)	1997-10-06	Walnut Creek, California	Denver (NCHC)	—
15	(Sweden)	Hugo Esselin	Junior	F	6' 2" (1.88 m)	199 lb (90 kg)	2000-07-15	Stockholm, Sweden	Djurgårdens J20 (J20 SuperElit)	—
16	(Canada)	Regan Kimens	Junior	F	6' 2" (1.88 m)	192 lb (87 kg)	1999-03-28	Vaughan, Ontario	Coquitlam (BCHL)	—
17	(United States)	Mac Welsher	Junior	F	5' 8" (1.73 m)	182 lb (83 kg)	1999-04-24	Grosse Pointe Farms, Michigan	Des Moines (USHL)	—
18	(Canada)	Ben Brar	Junior	F	6' 2" (1.88 m)	193 lb (88 kg)	1998-11-19	Abbotsford, British Columbia	Prince George (BCHL)	—
19	(United States)	Alex Jefferies	Sophomore	F	6' 0" (1.83 m)	199 lb (90 kg)	2001-11-08	Lunenburg, Massachusetts	The Gunnery (USHS–CT)	NYI, 121st overall 2020
20	(Canada)	Mark Hillier	Freshman	F	6' 1" (1.85 m)	180 lb (82 kg)	2002-03-18	Labrador City, Newfoundland and Labrador	Summerside (MHL)	—
21	(United States)	Matt Copponi	Freshman	F	5' 11" (1.8 m)	161 lb (73 kg)	2003-06-04	Mansfield, Massachusetts	Dexter Southfield (USHS–MA)	—
22	(United States)	Logan Drevitch (A)	Senior	F	5' 9" (1.75 m)	168 lb (76 kg)	1998-04-14	Middleborough, Massachusetts	Boston Bandits (NCDC)	—
23	(Canada)	Devlin O'Brien	Freshman	F	5' 11" (1.8 m)	185 lb (84 kg)	2002-04-05	Toronto, Ontario	Penticton (BCHL)	—
24	(United States)	Ryan Nolan	Junior	F	6' 1" (1.85 m)	198 lb (90 kg)	1998-07-14	Winnetka, Illinois	Victoria (BCHL)	—
25	(Sweden)	Filip Karlsson-Tägtström	Sophomore	F	5' 9" (1.75 m)	165 lb (75 kg)	1999-07-14	Stockholm, Sweden	Sioux Falls (USHL)	—
26	(Sweden)	Ivan Zivlak	Freshman	D	6' 2" (1.88 m)	179 lb (81 kg)	2002-08-08	Gislaved, Sweden	Linköping J20 (J20 Nationell)	—
27	(Sweden)	Adam Arvedson	Freshman	D	6' 0" (1.83 m)	176 lb (80 kg)	2001-08-30	Karlstad, Sweden	Färjestad (J20 Nationell)	—
28	(Sweden)	Filip Forsmark	Junior	F	5' 11" (1.8 m)	166 lb (75 kg)	1998-06-23	Skövde, Sweden	Tri-City (USHL)	—
29	(United States)	Zachary Borgiel	Sophomore	G	6' 2" (1.88 m)	205 lb (93 kg)	2000-04-27	Fort Gratiot, Michigan	Cowichan Valley (BCHL)	—
30	(United States)	Troy Kobryn	Junior	G	6' 0" (1.83 m)	198 lb (90 kg)	1999-02-14	Hillsborough, New Jersey	Cedar Rapids (USHL)	—

== Standings ==
2021–22 Hockey East Standings
	Conference record										Overall record					
	GP	W	L	T	OTW	OTL	SOW	PTS	GF	GA	GP	W	L	T	GF	GA
#12 Northeastern †	24	15	8	1	1	1	1	47	68	46	39	25	13	1	99	68
#10 Massachusetts *	24	14	8	2	2	3	1	46	77	54	37	22	13	2	117	88
#13 Massachusetts Lowell	24	15	8	1	1	0	1	46	62	48	35	21	11	3	102	74
#19 Connecticut	24	14	10	0	2	1	0	41	73	61	36	20	16	0	109	89
Boston University	24	13	8	3	3	2	0	41	69	58	35	19	13	3	107	89
Merrimack	24	13	11	0	1	3	0	41	70	70	35	19	15	1	109	99
#20 Providence	24	12	11	1	1	1	1	38	61	52	38	22	14	2	118	82
Boston College	24	9	12	3	0	1	1	32	67	77	38	15	18	5	114	123
New Hampshire	24	8	15	1	2	2	0	25	47	71	34	14	19	1	76	95
Vermont	24	6	16	2	3	1	2	20	41	72	35	8	25	2	59	101
Maine	24	5	17	2	2	3	1	19	54	80	33	7	22	4	74	111
Championship: March 19, 2022 † indicates regular season champion * indicates conference tournament champion (Lamoriello Trophy); Rankings: USCHO.com Top 20 Poll

== Schedule and results ==
Date	Time	Opponent^{#}	Rank^{#}	Site	TV	Decision	Result	Attendance	Record
Regular season
October 7	7:00 PM	at #11 Providence		Schneider Arena • Providence, Rhode Island	NESN	Borgiel	L 2–5	2,587	0–1–0 (0–1–0)
October 9	7:00 PM	Sacred Heart*		J. Thom Lawler Rink • North Andover, Massachusetts		Borgiel	W 4–2	1,152	1–1–0
October 15	7:00 PM	at Colgate*		Class of 1965 Arena • Hamilton, New York		Ollas	L 1–2 ^{OT}	917	1–2–0
October 16	4:00 PM	at Colgate*		Class of 1965 Arena • Hamilton, New York		Borgiel	W 5–3	614	2–2–0
October 22	7:00 PM	at #16 Boston University		J. Thom Lawler Rink • North Andover, Massachusetts		Borgiel	W 3–2	2,174	3–2–0 (1–1–0)
October 23	7:00 PM	at #16 Boston University		Agganis Arena • Boston, Massachusetts		Kobryn	L 6–8	5,339	3–3–0 (1–2–0)
October 29	7:00 PM	#12 Massachusetts		J. Thom Lawler Rink • North Andover, Massachusetts	NESN+	Borgiel	L 4–5 ^{OT}	3,477	3–4–0 (1–3–0)
October 30	7:00 PM	at #12 Massachusetts		Mullins Center • Amherst, Massachusetts		Borgiel	L 1–2	2,083	3–5–0 (1–4–0)
November 5	7:00 PM	#14 Boston College		J. Thom Lawler Rink • North Andover, Massachusetts		Borgiel	L 4–1	2,314	3–6–0 (1–5–0)
November 6	4:00 PM	at #14 Boston College		Conte Forum • Chestnut Hill, Massachusetts		Ollas	W 4–3	4,246	4–6–0 (2–5–0)
November 12	7:30 PM	at Maine		Alfond Arena • Orono, Maine		Ollas	L 5–6 ^{OT}	3,007	4–7–0 (2–6–0)
November 13	7:30 PM	at Maine		Alfond Arena • Orono, Maine		Borgiel	W 2–0	3,189	5–7–0 (3–6–0)
November 23	7:00 PM	at Holy Cross*		Hart Center • Worcester, Massachusetts		Ollas	W 3–2	214	6–7–0
November 27	4:00 PM	Union*		J. Thom Lawler Rink • North Andover, Massachusetts		Ollas	L 2–3	1,746	6–8–0
December 9	7:00 PM	#12 Massachusetts		J. Thom Lawler Rink • North Andover, Massachusetts		Borgiel	L 2–3	2,122	6–9–0 (3–7–0)
December 12	3:00 PM	USNTDP		J. Thom Lawler Rink • North Andover, Massachusetts (Exhibition)			W 8–2		
December 17	7:00 PM	Dartmouth*		J. Thom Lawler Rink • North Andover, Massachusetts		Borgiel	T 2–2 ^{OT}	1,022	6–9–1
January 2	4:00 PM	Brown*		Meehan Auditorium • Providence, Rhode Island		Ollas	W 7–1	160	7–9–1
January 3	6:00 PM	at #10 Massachusetts*		Mullins Center • Amherst, Massachusetts		Borgiel	L 3–4 ^{OT}	529	7–10–1
January 8	7:00 PM	Bentley*		J. Thom Lawler Rink • North Andover, Massachusetts		Ollas	W 4–1	1,093	8–10–1
January 14	7:00 PM	#17 Providence		J. Thom Lawler Rink • North Andover, Massachusetts		Ollas	W 3–2	1,587	9–10–1 (4–7–0)
January 15	5:30 PM	at #17 Providence		Schneider Arena • Providence, Rhode Island		Borgiel	W 2–1	2,128	10–10–1 (5–7–0)
January 21	7:00 PM	#10 Massachusetts Lowell		J. Thom Lawler Rink • North Andover, Massachusetts		Ollas	W 3–1	2,471	11–10–1 (6–7–0)
January 22	6:05 PM	at #10 Massachusetts Lowell		Tsongas Center • Lowell, Massachusetts		Borgiel	W 3–2	5,471	12–10–1 (7–7–0)
January 25	7:05 PM	at Connecticut	#19	XL Center • Hartford, Connecticut		Ollas	L 2–3	2,429	12–11–1 (7–8–0)
February 4	7:00 PM	New Hampshire		J. Thom Lawler Rink • North Andover, Massachusetts		Borgiel	W 5–2	2,177	13–11–1 (8–8–0)
February 5	7:00 PM	Maine		J. Thom Lawler Rink • North Andover, Massachusetts		Ollas	W 5–0	2,215	14–11–1 (9–8–0)
February 8	7:00 PM	Connecticut		J. Thom Lawler Rink • North Andover, Massachusetts		Borgiel	L 2–6	1,953	14–12–1 (9–9–0)
February 13	1:05 PM	at Vermont		Gutterson Fieldhouse • Burlington, Vermont		Ollas	W 4–1	2,158	15–12–1 (10–9–0)
February 18	7:00 PM	Vermont		J. Thom Lawler Rink • North Andover, Massachusetts		Ollas	W 3–2	1,873	16–12–1 (11–9–0)
February 19	7:30 PM	Vermont		J. Thom Lawler Rink • North Andover, Massachusetts		Borgiel	W 3–2	1,689	17–12–1 (12–9–0)
February 26	7:00 PM	at New Hampshire		Whittemore Center • Durham, New Hampshire		Borgiel	W 4–3	5,348	18–12–1 (13–9–0)
March 4	7:00 PM	#13 Northeastern		Matthews Arena • Boston, Massachusetts		Borgiel	L 1–6	1,779	18–13–1 (13–10–0)
March 5	7:00 PM	#13 Northeastern		J. Thom Lawler Rink • North Andover, Massachusetts		Borgiel	L 0–1	2,549	18–14–1 (13–11–0)
Hockey East Tournament
March 9	7:00 PM	Maine*		J. Thom Lawler Rink • North Andover, Massachusetts		Ollas	W 6–2	2,549	19–14–1
March 12	7:00 PM	at #14 Massachusetts Lowell*		Tsongas Center • Lowell, Massachusetts (Quarterfinals)		Ollas	L 2–7	5,782	19–15–1
*Non-conference game. ^{#}Rankings from USCHO.com Poll. All times are in Eastern Time. Source:

== Scoring statistics ==
Name	Position	Games	Goals	Assists	Points	PIM
Max Newton	F	35	14	24	38	16
Steven Jandric	LW	34	8	20	28	10
Filip Forsmark	LW/RW	33	11	16	27	35
Liam Walsh	LW	34	10	17	27	41
Declan Carlile	D	35	7	17	24	8
Alex Jefferies	LW	33	10	13	23	10
Ben Brar	F	35	11	9	20	20
Zach Uens	D	34	2	17	19	28
Zach Vinnell	D	35	4	12	16	12
Logan Drevitch	LW	35	5	8	13	18
Matt Copponi	C	25	3	6	9	14
Jake Durflinger	RW	34	3	6	9	18
Mac Welsher	C	32	6	2	8	10
Jordan Seyfert	C	20	2	6	8	2
Filip Karlsson-Tägtström	C	18	3	4	7	2
Mick Messner	LW	21	1	5	6	4
Christian Felton	D	27	2	2	4	16
Adam Arvedson	D	19	1	3	4	10
Hugo Esselin	C	8	2	1	3	0
Regan Kimens	LW	10	2	1	3	8
Mark Hillier	G	13	1	2	3	2
Ryan Nolan	G	15	1	2	3	6
Ivan Zivlak	D	12	0	2	2	2
Liam Dennison	D	32	0	2	2	10
Mike Brown	D	21	0	1	1	6
Troy Kobryn	G	2	0	0	0	0
Kevin Sadovski	D	2	0	0	0	0
Devlin O'Brien	LW	11	0	0	0	2
Hugo Ollas	G	18	0	0	0	0
Zachary Borgiel	G	20	0	0	0	4
Total			109	198	307	314

== Goaltending statistics ==
Name	Games	Minutes	Wins	Losses	Ties	Goals against	Saves	Shut outs	SV %	GAA
Hugo Ollas	18	964	10	6	0	36	414	1	.920	2.24
Zachary Borgiel	20	1087	9	8	1	55	448	1	.891	3.03
Troy Kobryn	2	47	0	1	0	4	20	0	.833	5.05
Empty Net	-	22	-	-	-	4	-	-	-	-
Total	35	2121	19	15	1	99	882	2	.899	2.80

== Rankings ==
Poll	Week																									
Poll	Pre	1	2	3	4	5	6	7	8	9	10	11	12	13	14	15	16	17	18	19	20	21	22	23	24	25 (Final)
USCHO.com	NR	NR	NR	NR	NR	NR	NR	NR	NR	NR	NR	NR	NR	NR	NR	19	NR	NR	NR	NR	NR	NR	NR	NR	-	NR
USA Today	NR	NR	NR	NR	NR	NR	NR	NR	NR	NR	NR	NR	NR	NR	NR	NR	NR	NR	NR	NR	NR	NR	NR	NR	NR	NR

Note: USCHO did not release a poll in week 24.

== Awards and honors ==
Player	Award	Ref
Jordan Seyfert	Derek Hines Unsung Hero Award	
Declan Carlile	Hockey East Second Team	
