= 2021–22 Maine Black Bears men's ice hockey season =

- Conference: 11th Hockey East
- Home ice: Alfond Arena

Rankings
- USCHO: NR
- USA Today: NR

Record
- Overall: 7–22–4
- Conference: 5–17–3
- Home: 6–9–3
- Road: 1–13–1

Coaches and captains
- Head coach: Ben Barr
- Assistant coaches: Alfie Michaud; Jason Fortier
- Captain: Jack Quinlivan
- Alternate captain(s): Simon Butala; Adam Dawe

The 2021–22 Maine Black Bears Men's ice hockey season was the 47th season of play for the program, the 45th season competing at the Division I level, and the 38th season in the Hockey East conference. The Black Bears represented the University of Maine and played their home games at Alfond Arena, and were coached by Ben Barr, in his 1st season as head coach.

== Season ==
With the still recovering from the sudden death of the previous head coach, Red Gendron, Maine struggled through the early part of the season. Despite returning almost off the players from the previous season, the offense was unable to coalesce and proved to be a hindrance for the Black Bears' success. Maine was shutout seven times during the season and finished as one of the lowest goal for in the nation. Compounding their problems was a less-than-stellar performance in goal. Victor Östman and Matthew Thiessen split the starting job but both were fairly inconsistent.

Maine's start doomed their postseason hopes and by mid-December the Black Bears had just 1 win in 16 games. They played better in the second half, Nearly quadrupling their win total, and took games from Massachusetts and Boston University, both ranked teams. Unfortunately, Maine could never put together a string of good play and ended the year with the worst record in Hockey East. In their only playoff match, the Bears were soundly beaten by Merrimack. While the overall results were lackluster, the team did show improvement as the year went on.

== Departures ==
Player	Position	Nationality	Cause
Dominic Dockery	Defenseman	United States	Left mid-season (signed with Wheeling Nailers)
Kabore Dunn	Defenseman	Canada	Returned to juniors (transferred to Lindenwood)
J. D. Greenway	Defenseman	United States	Graduation (signed with Providence Bruins)
Levi Kleiboer	Defenseman	Canada	Transferred to Mount Royal
Veli-Matti Tiuraniemi	Defenseman	Finland	Graduation (signed with Oulun Kärpät)
Eduards Tralmaks	Forward	Latvia	Graduation (signed with Providence Bruins)

== Recruiting ==
Player	Position	Nationality	Age	Notes
David Breazeale	Defenseman	United States	21	Jenison, MI
Dominic Dockery	Defenseman	United States	24	Lockport, NY; graduate transfer from Merrimack
Matt Fawcett	Forward	United States	22	Lincoln, RI; transfer from Quinnipiac
Tim Gould	Defenseman	Canada	21	Moncton, NB
Grant Hebert	Forward	Canada	24	St. Andrew's West, ON; transfer from Robert Morris
Nolan Renwick	Forward	Canada	20	Milestone, SK

== Roster ==
As of August 19, 2021.

No.	Nat.	Player	Class	Pos	Height	Weight	DoB	Hometown	Previous team	NHL rights
2	(Czech Republic)	Jakub Sirota	Senior	D	6' 2" (1.88 m)	205 lb (93 kg)	1998-12-20	Kroměříž, Czech Republic	Lone Star Brahmas (NAHL)	—
3	(Canada)	Grant Hebert	Senior	F	6' 3" (1.91 m)	175 lb (79 kg)	1997-05-22	St. Andrews West, Ontario	Robert Morris (AHA)	—
4	(United States)	Jack Quinlivan (C)	Graduate	F	6' 0" (1.83 m)	195 lb (88 kg)	1996-05-20	Shrewsbury, Massachusetts	Boston Junior Bruins (USPHL)	—
5	(Canada)	Kabore Dunn	Sophomore	D	6' 2" (1.88 m)	178 lb (81 kg)	2001-11-10	Mill Bay, British Columbia	Fort McMurray Oil Barons (AJHL)	—
6	(United States)	Simon Butala (A)	Senior	D	6' 2" (1.88 m)	190 lb (86 kg)	1998-08-01	Downingtown, Pennsylvania	Central Illinois Flying Aces (USHL)	—
7	(Canada)	Tristan Poissant	Sophomore	F	6' 1" (1.85 m)	185 lb (84 kg)	2000-08-27	Les Coteaux, Quebec	Johnstown Tomahawks (NAHL)	—
10	(United States)	Kevin Hock	Graduate	F	5' 11" (1.8 m)	186 lb (84 kg)	1996-11-09	Braintree, Massachusetts	South Shore Kings (USPHL)	—
11	(Canada)	Donavan Villeneuve-Houle	Sophomore	F	6' 0" (1.83 m)	185 lb (84 kg)	1999-11-04	Montreal, Quebec	Flin Flon Bombers (SJHL)	—
12	(Canada)	Ben Poisson	Junior	F	6' 1" (1.85 m)	195 lb (88 kg)	1999-08-31	Vancouver, British Columbia	Prince George Spruce Kings (BCHL)	—
13	(United States)	Zachary Aughe	Sophomore	F	6' 3" (1.91 m)	205 lb (93 kg)	2000-02-18	Clarkston, Michigan	Aberdeen Wings (NAHL)	—
14	(Denmark)	Jacob Schmidt-Svejstrup	Senior	F	6' 2" (1.88 m)	205 lb (93 kg)	1998-01-18	Charlottenlund, Denmark	Fargo Force (USHL)	—
15	(United States)	Brady Gaudette	Junior	F	5' 10" (1.78 m)	175 lb (79 kg)	1999-03-19	Braintree, Massachusetts	Northeast Generals (NAHL)	—
16	(United States)	John Mulera	Sophomore	F	5' 8" (1.73 m)	165 lb (75 kg)	1999-03-11	Rockville, Maryland	Boston Junior Bruins (NCDC)	—
17	(United States)	A. J. Drobot	Junior	F	5' 10" (1.78 m)	175 lb (79 kg)	1998-04-14	Churchville, Pennsylvania	Fargo Force (USHL)	—
20	(Canada)	Tim Gould	Freshman	D	6' 0" (1.83 m)	181 lb (82 kg)	2000-02-06	Moncton, New Brunswick	Amherst Ramblers (MHL)	—
21	(Sweden)	Edward Lindelöw	Senior	F	6' 1" (1.85 m)	205 lb (93 kg)	1997-06-10	Stockholm, Sweden	Minnesota Wilderness (NAHL)	—
22	(Canada)	Dawson Bruneski	Junior	F	5' 11" (1.8 m)	170 lb (77 kg)	1999-06-24	Camrose, Alberta	Drumheller Dragons (AJHL)	—
23	(Canada)	Nolan Renwick	Freshman	F	6' 3" (1.91 m)	196 lb (89 kg)	2001-02-16	Milestone, Saskatchewan	Omaha Lancers (USHL)	—
24	(Canada)	Adam Dawe (A)	Senior	F	5' 8" (1.73 m)	161 lb (73 kg)	1999-01-18	Gander, Newfoundland and Labrador	Sioux Falls Stampede (USHL)	—
25	(United States)	Perry Winfree	Junior	D	6' 1" (1.85 m)	180 lb (82 kg)	1999-11-24	Cary, North Carolina	Jersey Hitmen (NCDC)	—
26	(United States)	Cameron Spicer	Graduate	D	6' 1" (1.85 m)	192 lb (87 kg)	1996-02-22	Erie, Colorado	Islanders Hockey Club (USPHL)	—
27	(Canada)	Lynden Breen	Sophomore	F	5' 9" (1.75 m)	168 lb (76 kg)	2001-05-31	Grand Bay-Westfield, New Brunswick	Fargo Force (USHL)	—
28	(Canada)	Brad Morrissey	Sophomore	F	5' 11" (1.8 m)	168 lb (76 kg)	2001-01-18	Tignish, Prince Edward Island	Lincoln Stars (USHL)	—
29	(Canada)	Adrien Bisson	Junior	D	6' 1" (1.85 m)	180 lb (82 kg)	1999-01-18	Cornwall, Ontario	Ottawa Jr. Senators (CCHL)	—
30	(Sweden)	Emil Westerlund	Graduate	F	6' 2" (1.88 m)	198 lb (90 kg)	1998-02-16	Linköping, Sweden	Linköpings J20 (J20 SuperElit)	—
31	(United States)	Remy Parker	Junior	F	6' 3" (1.91 m)	170 lb (77 kg)	1998-04-27	Montclair, New Jersey	Jersey Hitmen (NCDC)	—
32	(Sweden)	Victor Östman	Sophomore	G	6' 4" (1.93 m)	205 lb (93 kg)	2000-10-03	Danderyd, Sweden	Chicago Steel (USHL)	—
33	(United States)	Connor Androlewicz	Sophomore	G	6' 2" (1.88 m)	202 lb (92 kg)	2000-11-28	St. Louis, Missouri	Lincoln Stars (USHL)	—
34	(Canada)	Keenan Suthers	Graduate	F	6' 8" (2.03 m)	245 lb (111 kg)	1998-04-27	Tecumseh, Ontario	St. Lawrence (ECAC)	—
35	(Canada)	Matthew Thiessen	Junior	G	6' 2" (1.88 m)	214 lb (97 kg)	2000-06-09	Altona, Manitoba	Dubuque Fighting Saints (USHL)	VAN, 192nd overall 2018
36	(United States)	Matthew Fawcett	Junior	F	5' 6" (1.68 m)	148 lb (67 kg)	1999-04-22	Lincoln, Rhode Island	Quinnipiac (ECAC)	—
37	(United States)	David Breazeale	Freshman	D	6' 4" (1.93 m)	201 lb (91 kg)	2000-04-22	Jenison, Michigan	Shreveport Mudbugs (NAHL)	—
	(United States)	Dominic Dockery	Graduate	D	6' 2" (1.88 m)	185 lb (84 kg)	1997-01-02	Lockport, New York	Merrimack (HEA)	—

== Standings ==
2021–22 Hockey East Standings
	Conference record										Overall record					
	GP	W	L	T	OTW	OTL	SOW	PTS	GF	GA	GP	W	L	T	GF	GA
#12 Northeastern †	24	15	8	1	1	1	1	47	68	46	39	25	13	1	99	68
#10 Massachusetts *	24	14	8	2	2	3	1	46	77	54	37	22	13	2	117	88
#13 Massachusetts Lowell	24	15	8	1	1	0	1	46	62	48	35	21	11	3	102	74
#19 Connecticut	24	14	10	0	2	1	0	41	73	61	36	20	16	0	109	89
Boston University	24	13	8	3	3	2	0	41	69	58	35	19	13	3	107	89
Merrimack	24	13	11	0	1	3	0	41	70	70	35	19	15	1	109	99
#20 Providence	24	12	11	1	1	1	1	38	61	52	38	22	14	2	118	82
Boston College	24	9	12	3	0	1	1	32	67	77	38	15	18	5	114	123
New Hampshire	24	8	15	1	2	2	0	25	47	71	34	14	19	1	76	95
Vermont	24	6	16	2	3	1	2	20	41	72	35	8	25	2	59	101
Maine	24	5	17	2	2	3	1	19	54	80	33	7	22	4	74	111
Championship: March 19, 2022 † indicates regular season champion * indicates conference tournament champion (Lamoriello Trophy); Rankings: USCHO.com Top 20 Poll

== Schedule and results ==
Date	Time	Opponent^{#}	Rank^{#}	Site	TV	Decision	Result	Attendance	Record
Exhibition
October 2		vs. #9 Quinnipiac*		Phillips Exeter Academy Rink • Exeter, New Hampshire (Exhibition)		Thiessen	L 0–7		
Regular season
October 8	8:07 PM	at #17 Omaha*		Baxter Arena • Omaha, Nebraska		Östman	L 1–4	4,036	0–1–0
October 9	7:07 PM	at #17 Omaha*		Baxter Arena • Omaha, Nebraska		Östman	L 3–5	2,919	0–2–0
October 22	7:30 PM	Sacred Heart*		Alfond Arena • Orono, Maine		Thiessen	L 0–1	4,142	0–3–0
October 23	5:00 PM	Sacred Heart*		Alfond Arena • Orono, Maine		Thiessen	T 3–3 ^{OT}	3,136	0–3–1
October 29	7:00 PM	at #20 Northeastern		Matthews Arena • Boston, Massachusetts	NESN	Thiessen	L 0–5	2,138	0–4–1 (0–1–0)
October 30	7:00 PM	at #20 Northeastern		Matthews Arena • Boston, Massachusetts		Östman	L 2–3	2,179	0–5–1 (0–2–0)
November 5	7:30 PM	Connecticut		Alfond Arena • Orono, Maine		Thiessen	L 3–4	3,790	0–6–1 (0–3–0)
November 6	7:00 PM	Connecticut		Alfond Arena • Orono, Maine		Östman	L 2–3 ^{OT}	3,781	0–7–1 (0–4–0)
November 12	7:37 PM	Merrimack		Alfond Arena • Orono, Maine		Östman	W 6–5 ^{OT}	3,007	1–7–1 (1–4–1)
November 13	7:30 PM	Merrimack		Alfond Arena • Orono, Maine		Thiessen	L 0–2	3,189	1–8–1 (1–5–1)
November 18	7:00 PM	at #19 Boston College		Conte Forum • Chestnut Hill, Massachusetts	NESN	Thiessen	L 2–6	3,177	1–9–1 (1–6–1)
November 19	7:00 PM	at #19 Boston College		Conte Forum • Chestnut Hill, Massachusetts	NESN+	Östman	T 2–2 ^{SOW}	4,224	1–9–2 (1–6–2)
November 27	5:00 PM	vs. #15 Massachusetts Lowell		Cross Insurance Arena • Portland, Maine		Östman	L 0–2	4,176	1–10–2 (1–7–2)
December 3	7:30 PM	Vermont		Alfond Arena • Orono, Maine	NESN+	Östman	L 0–1	3,059	1–11–2 (1–8–2)
December 4	7:00 PM	Vermont		Alfond Arena • Orono, Maine		Thiessen	T 1–1 ^{SOL}	3,435	1–11–3 (1–8–3)
December 10	7:00 PM	Union*		Alfond Arena • Orono, Maine		Thiessen	T 1–1 ^{OT}	2,631	1–11–4
December 11	7:00 PM	Union*		Alfond Arena • Orono, Maine		Östman	W 4–3	3,065	2–11–4
January 7	7:30 PM	Alaska*		Alfond Arena • Orono, Maine		Thiessen	L 2–6	2,468	2–12–4
January 8	7:00 PM	Alaska*		Alfond Arena • Orono, Maine		Androlewicz	W 4–2	2,978	3–12–4
January 14	7:15 PM	at #12 Massachusetts Lowell		Tsongas Center • Lowell, Massachusetts		Östman	L 3–5	4,217	3–13–4 (1–9–3)
January 15	6:05 PM	at #12 Massachusetts Lowell		Tsongas Center • Lowell, Massachusetts	NESN	Östman	L 3–4	3,013	3–14–4 (1–10–3)
January 28	7:30 PM	Boston College		Alfond Arena • Orono, Maine		Östman	W 4–1	3,369	4–14–4 (2–10–3)
February 4	7:30 PM	at #19 Boston University		Agganis Arena • Boston, Massachusetts		Östman	L 0–4	2,343	4–15–4 (2–11–3)
February 5	7:00 PM	at Merrimack		J. Thom Lawler Rink • North Andover, Massachusetts		Östman	L 0–5	2,215	4–16–4 (2–12–3)
February 11	7:00 PM	at #9 Massachusetts		Mullins Center • Amherst, Massachusetts		Östman	W 3–2 ^{OT}	3,294	5–16–4 (3–12–3)
February 12	7:00 PM	at #9 Massachusetts		Mullins Center • Amherst, Massachusetts	NESN	Östman	L 2–4	3,434	5–17–4 (3–13–3)
February 18	7:00 PM	New Hampshire		Alfond Arena • Orono, Maine	NESN	Östman	W 6–3	4,670	6–17–4 (4–13–3)
February 19	7:00 PM	New Hampshire		Alfond Arena • Orono, Maine		Östman	L 2–5	4,985	6–18–4 (4–14–3)
February 25	7:00 PM	at #19т Providence		Schneider Arena • Providence, Rhode Island		Östman	L 2–4	1,996	6–19–4 (4–15–3)
February 26	7:00 PM	at #19т Providence		Schneider Arena • Providence, Rhode Island		Thiessen	L 2–3 ^{OT}	2,042	6–20–4 (4–16–3)
March 4	7:30 PM	#14 Boston University		Alfond Arena • Orono, Maine		Östman	L 1–5	3,226	6–21–4 (4–17–3)
March 5	7:30 PM	#14 Boston University		Alfond Arena • Orono, Maine		Thiessen	W 8–1	3,651	7–21–4 (5–17–3)
Hockey East Tournament
March 9	7:00 PM	at Merrimack*		J. Thom Lawler Rink • North Andover, Massachusetts (Opening Round)		Thiessen	L 2–6	2,549	7–22–4
*Non-conference game. ^{#}Rankings from USCHO.com Poll. All times are in Eastern Time. Source:

== Scoring statistics ==
Name	Position	Games	Goals	Assists	Points	PIM
Lynden Breen	C	33	9	16	25	10
Donovan Houle-Villeneuve	C	32	10	9	19	44
Grant Hebert	C	29	7	9	16	35
David Breazeale	D	33	2	14	16	8
Ben Poisson	F	32	9	6	15	6
Jakub Sirota	D	26	4	10	14	10
Keenan Suthers	LW	30	5	8	13	23
Jacob Schmidt-Svejstrup	RW	28	4	8	12	8
Adam Dawe	C/RW	28	6	5	11	21
Nolan Renwick	RW	33	4	7	11	14
Matt Fawcett	F	20	5	2	7	8
Adrien Bisson	D	30	4	3	7	14
Jack Quinlivan	F	30	0	6	6	16
Dawson Bruneski	D	22	1	3	4	30
Samuel Duerr	D	10	0	4	4	4
Jonny Mulera	F	20	0	4	4	2
A. J. Drobot	RW	23	2	1	3	6
Tristan Poissant	F	23	0	3	3	4
Cameron Spicer	D	33	0	3	3	8
Brad Morrissey	RW	7	1	1	2	0
Tim Gould	D	11	0	2	2	0
Victor Östman	G	21	0	2	2	0
Simon Butala	D	28	0	2	2	20
Edward Lindelöw	C	23	1	0	1	17
Dominic Dockery	D	17	0	1	1	0
Perry Winfree	D	2	0	0	0	0
Connor Androlewicz	G	3	0	0	0	0
Kabore Dunn	D	4	0	0	0	0
Matthew Thiessen	G	12	0	0	0	0
Emil Westerlund	LW/RW	14	0	0	0	8
Total			74	129	203	316

== Goaltending statistics ==
Name	Games	Minutes	Wins	Losses	Ties	Goals against	Saves	Shut outs	SV %	GAA
Matthew Thiessen	12	656	1	8	3	34	269	0	.888	3.11
Victor Östman	21	1234	5	14	1	68	610	0	.900	3.31
Connor Androlewicz	2	105	1	0	0	6	44	0	.880	3.41
Empty Net	-	20	-	-	-	3	-	-	-	-
Total	33	2015	7	22	4	111	923	0	.893	3.30

== Rankings ==
Poll	Week																									
Poll	Pre	1	2	3	4	5	6	7	8	9	10	11	12	13	14	15	16	17	18	19	20	21	22	23	24	25 (Final)
USCHO.com	NR	NR	NR	NR	NR	NR	NR	NR	NR	NR	NR	NR	NR	NR	NR	NR	NR	NR	NR	NR	NR	NR	NR	NR	-	NR
USA Today	NR	NR	NR	NR	NR	NR	NR	NR	NR	NR	NR	NR	NR	NR	NR	NR	NR	NR	NR	NR	NR	NR	NR	NR	NR	NR

Note: USCHO did not release a poll in week 24.

== Awards and honors ==
Player	Award	Ref
David Breazeale	Hockey East Rookie Team	
