= 2021–22 New Hampshire Wildcats men's ice hockey season =

- Conference: 9th Hockey East
- Home ice: Whittemore Center

Rankings
- USCHO: NR
- USA Today: NR

Record
- Overall: 14–19–1
- Conference: 8–15–1
- Home: 9–6–1
- Road: 4–13–0
- Neutral: 1–0–0

Coaches and captains
- Head coach: Mike Souza
- Assistant coaches: Glenn Stewart; Jeff Giuliano; Ty Conklin
- Captain: Will MacKinnon
- Alternate captain(s): Eric MacAdams; Jackson Pierson; Ryan Verrier

The 2021–22 New Hampshire Wildcats Men's ice hockey season was the 96th season of play for the program and the 38th season in the Hockey East conference. The Wildcats represented the University of New Hampshire and were coached by Mike Souza, in his 4th season.

== Season ==
For much of the season, New Hampshire's attempt at rebuilding the program were hampered by a lack of offense. The Wildcats finished almost as many games being shut out (four) as scoring more than 3 goals (five). A majority of the team's victories came as a result of strong defensive play.

UNH had their moments during the year, defeating several ranked teams, but they couldn't sustain their success for long. In the first half of the season the wildcats hovered around the .500 mark. After returning from the winter break, the team went on a 5-game winning streak to get their head above water. After that good stretch, however, the team stumbled down the stretch and lost eight of their final ten games. The offense was about as strong as it had been earlier in the year but the defense faltered, allowing almost 4 goals per game over that span.

The result of their poor finish was that New Hampshire slid down the Hockey East standings and had to open the conference playoffs on the road. They travelled south to play Boston College and vastly outshot the Eagles in the match, 47–27. Unfortunately, the defense was again an issue and the team needed a hat-trick from Tyler Ward just to get the game into overtime. It was not the Wildcat's night, unfortunately, and BC netted the game-winner. The loss capped off the season which, though it was an improvement over the previous campaign, was the 8th consecutive year that UNH did not possess a winning record.

== Departures ==
Player	Position	Nationality	Cause
Angus Crookshank	Forward	Canada	Signed professional contract (Ottawa Senators)
Patrick Grasso	Forward	United States	Graduation (signed with Utica Comets)
Charlie Kelleher	Forward	United States	Graduation (retired)
Benton Maass	Defenseman	United States	Graduate transfer to Minnesota State
Joe Nagle	Defenseman	United States	Transferred to Norwich
Kohei Sato	Forward	Japan	Graduate transfer to Bentley
Ty Taylor	Goaltender	Canada	Transferred to MacEwan

== Recruiting ==
Player	Position	Nationality	Age	Notes
Harrison Blaisdell	Forward	United Kingdom	20	Sheffield, GBR; transfer from North Dakota; selected 134th overall in 2019
Robert Cronin	Forward	United States	21	Plymouth, MA
Liam Devlin	Forward	United States	20	Needham, MA
David Fessenden	Goaltender	United States	23	Parker, CO; transfer from Alabama–Huntsville
Alex Gagne	Defenseman	United States	19	Bedford, NH; selected 192nd overall in 2021
Rafe Gaughan	Goaltender	United States	21	Somersworth, NH; joined mid-season
Colton Huard	Defenseman	Canada	20	Welland, ON
Will Margel	Forward	United States	20	Potomac, MD
Connor Sweeney	Forward	United States	21	North Andover, MA

== Roster ==
As of August 19, 2021.

No.	Nat.	Player	Class	Pos	Height	Weight	DoB	Hometown	Previous team	NHL rights
1	(United States)	Jeremy Forman	Sophomore	G	5' 10" (1.78 m)	150 lb (68 kg)	1999-09-22	Northbrook, Illinois	Corpus Christi IceRays (NAHL)	—
2	(United States)	Drew Hickey	Senior	D	5' 11" (1.8 m)	188 lb (85 kg)	1997-10-28	New Canaan, Connecticut	Connecticut Jr. Rangers (NCDC)	—
3	(United States)	Ryan Verrier (A)	Senior	D	6' 0" (1.83 m)	193 lb (88 kg)	1998-11-19	Reading, Massachusetts	Green Bay Gamblers (USHL)	—
5	(United States)	Will MacKinnon (C)	Senior	D	5' 11" (1.8 m)	202 lb (92 kg)	2000-04-13	Plymouth, Michigan	Des Moines Buccaneers (USHL)	—
6	(United States)	Lucas Herrmann	Junior	F	6' 2" (1.88 m)	210 lb (95 kg)	2000-08-01	Lancaster, New York	Madison Capitols (USHL)	—
7	(United States)	Alec Semandel	Senior	D	6' 3" (1.91 m)	206 lb (93 kg)	1998-05-23	Waunakee, Wisconsin	Lake Superior State (WCHA)	—
8	(United States)	Nikolai Jenson	Sophomore	D	5' 11" (1.8 m)	193 lb (88 kg)	2000-07-28	Cold Spring, Minnesota	Youngstown Phantoms (USHL)	—
9	(United States)	Connor Sweeney	Freshman	F	6' 2" (1.88 m)	200 lb (91 kg)	2000-05-05	North Andover, Massachusetts	Islanders Hockey Club (NCDC)	—
10	(Sweden)	Kalle Eriksson	Junior	D	5' 10" (1.78 m)	178 lb (81 kg)	1999-09-15	Leksand, Sweden	Madison Capitols (USHL)	—
11	(United States)	Jackson Pierson (A)	Senior	F	5' 9" (1.75 m)	171 lb (78 kg)	1999-09-10	Zionsville, Indiana	Culver Academies (Midget AAA)	—
12	(United States)	Eric Esposito	Senior	F	5' 11" (1.8 m)	186 lb (84 kg)	1998-08-24	West Haven, Connecticut	Youngstown Phantoms (USHL)	—
13	(United States)	Nick Cafarelli	Sophomore	F	5' 10" (1.78 m)	182 lb (83 kg)	2001-12-31	Middleton, Massachusetts	Wenatchee Wild (BCHL)	—
14	(Canada)	Tyler Ward	Senior	F	5' 10" (1.78 m)	186 lb (84 kg)	1999-08-19	Kamloops, British Columbia	Denver (NCHC)	—
15	(Canada)	Chase Stevenson	Junior	F	5' 11" (1.8 m)	180 lb (82 kg)	1999-01-13	West Kelowna, British Columbia	Trail Smoke Eaters (BCHL)	—
16	(Sweden)	Filip Engarås	Senior	F	6' 0" (1.83 m)	199 lb (90 kg)	1999-05-16	Stockholm, Sweden	Skellefteå (J20 SuperElit)	EDM, 169th overall 2020
17	(United States)	Carsen Richels	Sophomore	F	6' 3" (1.91 m)	220 lb (100 kg)	2001-10-03	Ham Lake, Minnesota	Blaine High School (USHS–MN)	—
18	(Canada)	Harrison Blaisdell	Junior	F	5' 11" (1.8 m)	190 lb (86 kg)	2001-03-18	Regina, Saskatchewan	North Dakota (NCHC)	WPG, 134th overall 2019
19	(United States)	Eric MacAdams (A)	Senior	F	5' 11" (1.8 m)	187 lb (85 kg)	1997-04-29	Salem, Massachusetts	Dubuque Fighting Saints (USHL)	—
20	(United States)	Colton Huard	Freshman	D	6' 3" (1.91 m)	200 lb (91 kg)	2000-11-27	Foothill Ranch, California	Chicago Steel (USHL)	—
21	(United States)	Cam Gendron	Sophomore	D	6' 3" (1.91 m)	181 lb (82 kg)	1999-02-05	Hampstead, New Hampshire	New Jersey Titans (NAHL)	—
22	(United States)	Joe Hankinson	Junior	F	6' 0" (1.83 m)	194 lb (88 kg)	1999-06-15	Hopkins, Minnesota	Cedar Rapids RoughRiders (USHL)	—
24	(United States)	Robert Cronin	Freshman	F	5' 10" (1.78 m)	187 lb (85 kg)	2000-08-15	Plymouth, Massachusetts	Dubuque Fighting Saints (USHL)	—
25	(United States)	Will Margel	Freshman	F	5' 9" (1.75 m)	165 lb (75 kg)	2001-03-16	Potomac, Maryland	Johnstown Tomahawks (NAHL)	—
25	(United States)	Liam Devlin	Freshman	F	5' 11" (1.8 m)	192 lb (87 kg)	2001-01-07	Needham, Massachusetts	Omaha Lancers (USHL)	—
27	(Canada)	Luke Reid	Sophomore	D	6' 0" (1.83 m)	192 lb (87 kg)	2001-09-26	Warman, Saskatchewan	Chicago Steel (USHL)	NSH, 166th overall 2020
28	(United States)	Alex Gagne	Freshman	D	6' 4" (1.93 m)	207 lb (94 kg)	2002-08-12	Bedford, New Hampshire	Muskegon Lumberjacks (USHL)	TBL, 192nd overall 2021
29	(United States)	Joseph Cipollone	Senior	F	5' 8" (1.73 m)	180 lb (82 kg)	1997-03-29	Purchase, New York	Boston Junior Bruins (NCDC)	—
31	(United States)	Mike Robinson	Senior	G	6' 4" (1.93 m)	202 lb (92 kg)	1997-03-27	Bedford, New Hampshire	Springfield Jr. Blues (NAHL)	SJS, 86th overall 2015
35	(United States)	Rafe Gaughan	Freshman	G	6' 1" (1.85 m)	185 lb (84 kg)	2000-02-11	Somersworth, New Hampshire	Northeast Generals (NA3HL)	—
41	(United States)	David Fessenden	Junior	G	6' 6" (1.98 m)	230 lb (104 kg)	1998-04-30	Parker, Colorado	Alabama–Huntsville (WCHA)	—

== Standings ==
2021–22 Hockey East Standings
	Conference record										Overall record					
	GP	W	L	T	OTW	OTL	SOW	PTS	GF	GA	GP	W	L	T	GF	GA
#12 Northeastern †	24	15	8	1	1	1	1	47	68	46	39	25	13	1	99	68
#10 Massachusetts *	24	14	8	2	2	3	1	46	77	54	37	22	13	2	117	88
#13 Massachusetts Lowell	24	15	8	1	1	0	1	46	62	48	35	21	11	3	102	74
#19 Connecticut	24	14	10	0	2	1	0	41	73	61	36	20	16	0	109	89
Boston University	24	13	8	3	3	2	0	41	69	58	35	19	13	3	107	89
Merrimack	24	13	11	0	1	3	0	41	70	70	35	19	15	1	109	99
#20 Providence	24	12	11	1	1	1	1	38	61	52	38	22	14	2	118	82
Boston College	24	9	12	3	0	1	1	32	67	77	38	15	18	5	114	123
New Hampshire	24	8	15	1	2	2	0	25	47	71	34	14	19	1	76	95
Vermont	24	6	16	2	3	1	2	20	41	72	35	8	25	2	59	101
Maine	24	5	17	2	2	3	1	19	54	80	33	7	22	4	74	111
Championship: March 19, 2022 † indicates regular season champion * indicates conference tournament champion (Lamoriello Trophy); Rankings: USCHO.com Top 20 Poll

== Schedule and results ==
Date	Time	Opponent^{#}	Rank^{#}	Site	TV	Decision	Result	Attendance	Record
Regular season
October 8	7:00 PM	Union*		Whittemore Center • Durham, New Hampshire		Robinson	W 4–1	3,409	1–0–0
October 9	7:00 PM	Union*		Whittemore Center • Durham, New Hampshire		Robinson	W 3–2	3,273	2–0–0
October 15	9:05 PM	at Arizona State*		Oceanside Ice Arena • Tempe, Arizona		Forman	L 1–5	698	2–1–0
October 16	6:05 PM	at Arizona State*		Oceanside Ice Arena • Tempe, Arizona		Robinson	L 1–5	915	2–2–0
October 24	5:00 PM	#12 Providence		Whittemore Center • Durham, New Hampshire		Robinson	L 0–2	3,458	2–3–0 (0–1–0)
October 29	7:00 PM	at #8 Providence		Schneider Arena • Providence, Rhode Island	NESN+	Robinson	L 1–6	2,227	2–4–0 (0–2–0)
October 30	7:00 PM	#8 Providence		Whittemore Center • Durham, New Hampshire		Fessenden	W 2–1 ^{OT}	3,134	3–4–0 (1–2–0)
November 5	7:00 PM	Northeastern		Whittemore Center • Durham, New Hampshire	NESN+	Fessenden	L 1–4	4,063	3–5–0 (1–3–0)
November 6	7:00 PM	at Northeastern		Matthews Arena • Boston, Massachusetts		Robinson	L 1–4	2,352	3–6–0 (1–4–0)
November 12	7:00 PM	Vermont		Whittemore Center • Durham, New Hampshire	NESN	Fessenden	W 2–1	3,537	4–6–0 (2–4–0)
November 13	7:00 PM	Vermont		Whittemore Center • Durham, New Hampshire		Fessenden	T 3–3 ^{SOL}	3,606	4–6–1 (2–4–1)
November 19	7:00 PM	at #8 Massachusetts		Mullins Center • Amherst, Massachusetts	NESN	Fessenden	L 0–3	4,363	4–7–1 (2–5–1)
November 20	7:00 PM	#8 Massachusetts		Whittemore Center • Durham, New Hampshire		Robinson	W 2–1 ^{OT}	4,316	5–7–1 (3–5–1)
November 26	7:00 PM	at Harvard*		Bright-Landry Hockey Center • Boston, Massachusetts	NESN	Robinson	W 1–0	2,042	6–7–1
November 27	7:00 PM	Holy Cross*		Whittemore Center • Durham, New Hampshire	NESN	Robinson	W 3–2 ^{OT}	2,919	7–7–1
December 3	7:30 PM	at Boston University		Agganis Arena • Boston, Massachusetts		Robinson	L 1–3	3,123	7–8–1 (3–6–1)
December 4	7:00 PM	Boston University		Whittemore Center • Durham, New Hampshire		Robinson	L 1–2 ^{OT}	5,021	7–9–1 (3–7–1)
Ledyard Bank Classic
December 30	7:30 PM	at Dartmouth*		Thompson Arena • Hanover, New Hampshire (Ledyard Bank Semifinal)	NESN	Fessenden	L 1–3	178	7–10–1
December 31	4:00 PM	vs. Mercyhurst*		Thompson Arena • Hanover, New Hampshire (Ledyard Bank Consolation Game)		Robinson	W 7–1	48	8–10–1
January 8	7:00 PM	Clarkson*		Whittemore Center • Durham, New Hampshire		Robinson	W 5–1	3,213	9–10–1
January 14	7:00 PM	#20 Boston College		Whittemore Center • Durham, New Hampshire	NESN	Robinson	W 3–2	4,873	10–10–1 (4–7–1)
January 15	7:00 PM	at #20 Boston College		Conte Forum • Chestnut Hill, Massachusetts		Robinson	W 5–2	3,408	11–10–1 (5–7–1)
January 21	7:05 PM	at Connecticut		XL Center • Hartford, Connecticut		Robinson	W 3–1	2,928	12–10–1 (6–7–1)
January 22	4:05 PM	at Connecticut		XL Center • Hartford, Connecticut	NESN+	Robinson	L 2–3 ^{OT}	3,855	12–11–1 (6–8–1)
February 4	7:00 PM	at Merrimack		J. Thom Lawler Rink • North Andover, Massachusetts		Robinson	L 2–5	2,177	12–12–1 (6–9–1)
February 5	7:30 PM	at Connecticut		Whittemore Center • Durham, New Hampshire		Robinson	L 1–6	5,574	12–13–1 (6–10–1)
February 11	7:00 PM	at Vermont		Gutterson Fieldhouse • Burlington, Vermont		Robinson	L 0–3	2,672	12–14–1 (6–11–1)
February 13	2:00 PM	#13 Massachusetts Lowell		Whittemore Center • Durham, New Hampshire		Robinson	W 3–0	3,870	13–14–1 (7–11–1)
February 18	7:30 PM	at Maine		Alfond Arena • Orono, Maine	NESN	Robinson	L 3–6	4,670	13–15–1 (7–12–1)
February 19	7:00 PM	at Maine		Alfond Arena • Orono, Maine		Robinson	W 5–2	4,985	14–15–1 (8–12–1)
February 26	7:00 PM	Merrimack		Whittemore Center • Durham, New Hampshire		Robinson	L 3–4	5,348	14–16–1 (8–13–1)
March 4	7:00 PM	#16 Massachusetts Lowell		Whittemore Center • Durham, New Hampshire		Robinson	L 3–6	6,003	14–17–1 (8–14–1)
March 5	6:00 PM	at #16 Massachusetts Lowell		Tsongas Center • Lowell, Massachusetts		Fessenden	L 0–1	6,234	14–18–1 (8–16–1)
Hockey East Tournament
March 9	7:00 PM	at Boston College*		Conte Forum • Chestnut Hill, Massachusetts (Opening Round)		Robinson	L 3–4 ^{OT}	1,125	14–19–1
*Non-conference game. ^{#}Rankings from USCHO.com Poll. All times are in Eastern Time. Source:

== Scoring statistics ==
Name	Position	Games	Goals	Assists	Points	PIM
Tyler Ward	LW	34	11	16	27	4
Jackson Pierson	F	34	12	12	24	8
Filip Engarås	C	33	7	14	21	16
Liam Devlin	F	34	9	7	16	35
Colton Huard	D	28	6	10	16	6
Robert Cronin	F	30	7	5	12	16
Kalle Eriksson	D	32	0	12	12	12
Luke Reid	D	34	3	5	8	18
Harrison Blaisdell	C	25	2	6	8	6
Joe Cipollone	C	30	2	6	8	0
Eric MacAdams	RW	33	1	7	8	42
Alex Gagne	D	33	1	7	8	16
Nick Cafarelli	F	15	3	4	7	6
Ryan Verrier	D	24	1	6	7	28
Will MacKinnon	D	27	1	5	6	12
Nikolai Jenson	D	30	1	5	6	18
Chase Stevenson	F	33	4	1	5	16
Will Margel	C/W	18	1	3	4	6
Eric Esposito	LW	30	3	0	3	14
Cam Gendron	F	19	1	1	2	14
Lucas Herrmann	F	24	0	1	1	8
Jeremy Forman	G	1	0	0	0	0
Alec Semandel	D	1	0	0	0	0
Raphael Gaughan	G	1	0	0	0	0
Jake Moniz	G	1	0	0	0	0
Joe Hankinson	F	1	0	0	0	0
Drew Hickey	D	7	0	0	0	0
David Fessenden	G	9	0	0	0	0
Carsen Richels	LW	13	0	0	0	0
Connor Sweeney	F	22	0	0	0	2
Mike Robinson	G	27	0	0	0	15
Total			76	133	209	318

== Goaltending statistics ==
Name	Games	Minutes	Wins	Losses	Ties	Goals against	Saves	Shut outs	SV %	GAA
Raphael Gaughan	1	0:53	0	0	0	0	1	0	1.000	0.00
Jake Moniz	1	0:36	0	0	0	0	2	0	1.000	0.00
David Fessenden	9	492	2	4	1	18	180	0	.909	2.19
Mike Robinson	27	1513	12	14	0	66	618	2	.904	2.62
Jeremy Forman	1	34	0	1	0	4	13	0	.765	7.08
Empty Net	-	21	-	-	-	7	-	-	-	-
Total	34	2064	14	19	1	95	814	2	.895	2.76

== Rankings ==
Poll	Week																									
Poll	Pre	1	2	3	4	5	6	7	8	9	10	11	12	13	14	15	16	17	18	19	20	21	22	23	24	25 (Final)
USCHO.com	NR	NR	NR	NR	NR	NR	NR	NR	NR	NR	NR	NR	NR	NR	NR	NR	NR	NR	NR	NR	NR	NR	NR	NR	-	NR
USA Today	NR	NR	NR	NR	NR	NR	NR	NR	NR	NR	NR	NR	NR	NR	NR	NR	NR	NR	NR	NR	NR	NR	NR	NR	NR	NR

Note: USCHO did not release a poll in week 24.

== Players drafted into the NHL ==
=== 2022 NHL entry draft ===
Round	Pick	Player	NHL team
6	189	Tyler Muszelik^{†}	Florida Panthers

† incoming freshman

== Awards and honors ==
Player	Award	Ref
Jackson Pierson	Len Ceglarski Award	
