= Colin Felix =

American ice hockey player (born 1999)

- Born: January 7, 1999 (age 27) Camden, New Jersey, U.S.
- Height: 6 ft 1 in (185 cm)
- Weight: 203 lb (92 kg; 14 st 7 lb)
- Position: Defence
- Shoots: Right
- team Former teams: Free Agent; Lehigh Valley Phantoms; Reading Royals; Utica Comets; Adirondack Thunder; Rockford IceHogs; Providence Bruins; Maine Mariners
- NHL draft: Undrafted
- Playing career: 2022–present

Colin Robert Felix (born January 7, 1999) is an American professional ice hockey player who is currently an unrestricted free agent. He most recently played for the Providence Bruins of the American Hockey League (AHL).

== Early life ==
Felix was born on January 7, 1999, in Camden, New Jersey to parents Chris and Kimberly. Raised in Audubon, New Jersey, Felix chose to attend St. George's School in Rhode Island given the lack of a local competitive high school team, after which his family moved to Cape May County. He lived with his family in the Marmora section of Upper Township, New Jersey, near Ocean City. His father, Chris was the head athletic trainer for the Philadelphia Phantoms from 1996-2004.

He played junior hockey for the Madison Capitols of the United States Hockey League (USHL) before committing to the University of Massachusetts.

== Playing career ==
Felix joined the UMass Minutemen men's ice hockey team for the 2018-19 season.

During the 2020-21 season, Felix was a member of the UMass team that captured the program's first NCAA Division 1 men's ice hockey national championship with a 5-0 victory over St. Cloud State in the Frozen Four championship game. In his senior season, (2021-22), Felix appeared in 36 of the teams 37 games, recording two goals and eight assists for 10 points.

Felix signed his first professional contract with the Lehigh Valley Phantoms in the American Hockey League. Other AHL teams include the Utica Comets, Rockford IceHogs, and the Providence Bruins. He also spent time in the ECHL with the Reading Royals, Adirondack Thunder, and Maine Mariners.

== Career statistics ==
			Regular season					Playoffs
Season	Team	League	GP	G	A	Pts	PIM	GP	G	A	Pts	PIM
2016–17	Janesville Jets	NAHL	45	2	10	12	95	4	0	1	1	0
2017–18	Madison Capitols	USHL	56	8	19	27	166	—	—	—	—	—
2018–19	UMass Minutemen	NCAA	41	1	8	9	28	—	—	—	—	—
2019–20	UMass Minutemen	NCAA	34	1	12	13	45	—	—	—	—	—
2020–21	UMass Minutemen	NCAA	29	0	10	10	32	—	—	—	—	—
2021–22	UMass Minutemen	NCAA	36	2	8	10	30	—	—	—	—	—
2021–22	Lehigh Valley Phantoms	AHL	1	0	0	0	7	—	—	—	—	—
2022–23	Reading Royals	ECHL	72	8	19	27	139	11	0	2	2	27
2023–24	Utica Comets	AHL	23	0	2	2	47	—	—	—	—	—
2023–24	Adirondack Thunder	ECHL	41	5	13	18	64	19	0	2	2	58
2024–25	Rockford IceHogs	AHL	36	1	4	5	54	—	—	—	—	—
2025–26	Providence Bruins	AHL	28	0	4	4	73	1	0	0	0	0
2025–26	Maine Mariners	ECHL	12	1	2	3	48	—	—	—	—	—
AHL totals			88	1	10	11	181	1	0	0	0	0
