= 2022–23 Northeastern Huskies men's ice hockey season =

- Conference: 3rd Hockey East
- Home ice: Matthews Arena

Rankings
- USCHO: #16
- USA Today: #16

Record
- Overall: 17–13–5
- Conference: 14–7–3
- Home: 8–5–2
- Road: 7–7–2
- Neutral: 2–1–1

Coaches and captains
- Head coach: Jerry Keefe
- Assistant coaches: Mike Levine; Jason Guerriero; Mike Condon
- Captain: Aidan McDonough
- Alternate captain(s): Riley Hughes; Jakob Novak; Jayden Struble; Justin Hryckowian

The 2022–23 Northeastern Huskies Men's ice hockey season was the 91st season of play for the program and 39th in Hockey East. The Huskies represented Northeastern University in the 2022–23 NCAA Division I men's ice hockey season, were coached by Jerry Keefe in his 2nd season, and played their home games at Matthews Arena.

== Season ==
With most of team's top players returning, particularly reigning Mike Richter Award-winner, Devon Levi, Northeastern was expected to be in contention for an NCAA tournament appearance, if not a National Championship. The addition of four drafted players, including top prospect Cameron Lund, were only supposed to buoy the team's chances and led the Huskies to be picked as Hockey East's top team in the preseason.

Everything looked good at the start as NU won its first three games, seeing Levi post his 1st shutout of the season. The offense, led by team captain and All-American Aidan McDonough was solid as well, recording 13 goals in those matches. In the second half of October, however, the scoring diminished and the Huskies went four games without a win. The team seemed to recover by the beginning of November but that was only a short reprieve. After sweeping lowly New Hampshire, Northeastern went through a terrible stretch that lasted until after New Year's. In 10 games, the Huskies went 2–7–1 and lost games to several teams that were well outside the playoff picture. The defeats took a heavy toll on Northeastern's ranking and the team fell into the mid-40s by early January. The most surprising part of the skid was the subpar performance of Levi. While his numbers weren't necessarily bad, they were far below the stellar figures he had posted in '22.

During the skid, the Music City Hockey Classic, which was scheduled to take place in Nashville on November 25, had to be moved to the Ford Ice Center Bellevue in nearby Bellevue, Tennessee. The change in venue was caused by a water main break at the Bridgestone Arena.

After the team's nadir, a 4–8 loss to Harvard, there was little chance for the Huskies to make the tournament. Despite seemingly everything being arranged against Northeastern, the team found its resolve and quickly altered its fortunes. In the very next game, at Fenway Park, Levi had his best performance in over a month and led the Huskies to a win over Connecticut. That began a streak of 5 wins with 4 coming against ranked teams. UConn ended Northeastern's run with a loss at the beginning of February but that didn't stop the Huskies from regaining a spot in the polls.

The vastly improved play could not have come at a better time as Northeastern was getting set to take conference leader Boston University in the Beanpot semifinal. Levi was key in the team's upset of the Terriers, stopping 33 shots en route to a 3–1 win. A week later the Huskies took on Harvard in the championship and Levi was again called on to save the day. After the team got down 1–2, Levi stopped 14 Crimson shots in the third period while Gunnarwolfe Fontaine tied the score with his second goal of the match. Levi stopped everything Harvard threw at him after the start of the third and was named as the tournament MVP.

With the wins piling up, Northeastern was on the cusp of the playoff picture and had nearly recovered from its mid-season debacle. Unfortunately, the offense began to experience some inconsistency in the later portion of the season. The Huskies went 3–2 to end the regular season and slipped just below the cut line for the NCAA tournament. Fortunately, the team was just outside the playoff bubble and could use a good showing in the conference tournament to earn an at-large bid.

Northeastern finished 3rd in the conference and received a bye into the quarterfinal round as a result. The Huskies ended up playing host to Providence and got off to a good start. Cam Lund opened the scoring on the power play, staking Northeastern to a 1–0 lead after the first period. Starting in the second, however, the Friars took over the match. Providence ended up getting 20 shots on Levi in the middle frame and tied the game. The Huskies recovered a bit in the third but were unable to get another goal and the two teams needed overtime to settle the score. Providence was again the aggressor in extra time and scored on their third shot to end the Huskies' season.

== Departures ==
Player	Position	Nationality	Cause
Steven Agriogianis	Forward	United States	Transferred to Mercyhurst
Marco Bozzo	Forward	Canada	Graduation (signed with EHC Neuwied)
John DeRoche	Forward/Defenseman	United States	Graduation (retired)
Evan Fear	Goaltender	United States	Left program (retired)
Jordan Harris	Defenseman	United States	Graduation (signed with Montreal Canadiens)
Dylan Jackson	Forward	Canada	Transferred to Arizona State
Ty Jackson	Forward	Canada	Transferred to Arizona State
Julian Kislin	Defenseman	United States	Graduation (retired)
Tommy Miller	Defenseman	United States	Graduation (signed with Toronto Marlies)
T. J. Semptimphelter	Goaltender	United States	Transferred to Arizona State
Ryan St. Louis	Forward	United States	Returned to juniors (Dubuque Fighting Saints)

== Recruiting ==
Player	Position	Nationality	Age	Notes
Vincent Borgesi	Defenseman	United States	18	Philadelphia, PA
Harrison Chesney	Goaltender	United States	20	Malverne, NY
Jackson Dorrington	Defenseman	United States	18	North Reading, MA; selected 176th overall in 2022
Braden Doyle	Defenseman	United States	21	Lynnfield, MA; transfer from Boston University; selected 157th overall in 2019
Kyle Furey	Defenseman	United States	20	Marblehead, MA
Cameron Lund	Forward	United States	18	Bridgewater, MA; selected 34th overall in 2022
Hunter McDonald	Defenseman	United States	20	Fairport, NY; selected 165th overall in 2022
Anthony Messuri	Forward	United States	21	Arlington, MA
Grant Riley	Goaltender	United States	20	Rochester, NY
Liam Walsh	Forward	United States	23	Bridgeville, PA; transfer from Merrimack
Jack Williams	Forward	United States	20	Biddeford, ME

== Roster ==
As of August 11, 2022.

No.	Nat.	Player	Class	Pos	Height	Weight	DoB	Hometown	Previous team	NHL rights
1	(Canada)	Devon Levi	Junior	G	6' 0" (1.83 m)	190 lb (86 kg)	2001-12-27	Dollard-des-Ormeaux, Quebec	Carleton Place Canadians (CCHL)	BUF, 212th overall 2020
3	(United States)	Jayden Struble (A)	Senior	D	6' 1" (1.85 m)	205 lb (93 kg)	2001-09-08	Cumberland, Rhode Island	Saint Sebastian's School (USHS–MA)	MTL, 46th overall 2019
4	(Canada)	Jérémie Bucheler	Senior	D	6' 4" (1.93 m)	200 lb (91 kg)	2000-03-31	Saint-Laurent, Quebec	Victoria Grizzlies (BCHL)	—
5	(United States)	Hunter McDonald	Freshman	D	6' 4" (1.93 m)	207 lb (94 kg)	2002-05-11	Fairport, New York	Chicago Steel (USHL)	PHI, 165th overall 2022
6	(United States)	Chase McInnis	Sophomore	F	5' 11" (1.8 m)	185 lb (84 kg)	2001-02-23	Hingham, Massachusetts	Victoria Grizzlies (BCHL)	—
7	(United States)	Michael Outzen	Junior	F	6' 0" (1.83 m)	185 lb (84 kg)	1999-07-29	Lone Tree, Colorado	New Jersey Titans (NAHL)	—
8	(United States)	Jackson Dorrington	Freshman	D	6' 2" (1.88 m)	200 lb (91 kg)	2004-04-13	North Reading, Massachusetts	Des Moines Buccaneers (USHL)	VAN, 176th overall 2022
9	(Canada)	Matt Choupani	Sophomore	F	5' 11" (1.8 m)	185 lb (84 kg)	2002-01-02	Baie-D'Urfé, Quebec	Des Moines Buccaneers (USHL)	—
10	(Canada)	Jakov Novak (A)	Graduate	F	6' 3" (1.91 m)	210 lb (95 kg)	1998-10-22	Windsor, Ontario	Bentley (AHA)	OTT, 188th overall 2018
11	(United States)	Gunnarwolfe Fontaine	Junior	F	5' 10" (1.78 m)	175 lb (79 kg)	2000-09-16	East Greenwich, Rhode Island	Chicago Steel (USHL)	NSH, 202nd overall 2020
12	(United States)	Cameron Lund	Freshman	F	6' 2" (1.88 m)	190 lb (86 kg)	2004-06-07	Bridgewater, Massachusetts	Green Bay Gamblers (USHL)	SJS, 34th overall 2022
14	(United States)	Liam Walsh	Graduate	F	6' 1" (1.85 m)	200 lb (91 kg)	1999-07-14	Bridgeville, Pennsylvania	Merrimack (HEA)	—
15	(United States)	Jack Williams	Freshman	F	5' 11" (1.8 m)	170 lb (77 kg)	2002-03-02	Biddeford, Maine	Muskegon Lumberjacks (USHL)	—
16	(United States)	Sam Colangelo	Junior	F	6' 3" (1.91 m)	208 lb (94 kg)	2001-12-26	Stoneham, Massachusetts	Chicago Steel (USHL)	ANA, 36th overall 2020
17	(United States)	Braden Doyle	Sophomore	D	6' 0" (1.83 m)	177 lb (80 kg)	2001-08-24	Lynnfield, Massachusetts	Penticton Vees (BCHL)	LAK, 157th overall 2019
18	(Canada)	Tyler Spott	Senior	D	5' 11" (1.8 m)	175 lb (79 kg)	2000-06-17	Toronto, Ontario	Green Bay Gamblers (USHL)	—
19	(United States)	Riley Hughes (A)	Senior	F	6' 2" (1.88 m)	195 lb (88 kg)	2000-06-27	Westwood, Massachusetts	Victoria Grizzlies (BCHL)	NYR, 216th overall 2018
20	(United States)	Alex Mella	Senior	F	6' 0" (1.83 m)	190 lb (86 kg)	1999-02-21	Stamford, Connecticut	Madison Capitols (USHL)	—
21	(United States)	Matt DeMelis	Senior	F	6' 1" (1.85 m)	190 lb (86 kg)	1999-06-02	Hingham, Massachusetts	Youngstown Phantoms (USHL)	—
22	(United States)	Vinny Borgesi	Freshman	D	5' 8" (1.73 m)	170 lb (77 kg)	2004-03-02	Philadelphia, Pennsylvania	Tri-City Storm (USHL)	—
23	(United States)	Cam Gaudette	Sophomore	D	6' 1" (1.85 m)	190 lb (86 kg)	2000-06-01	Braintree, Massachusetts	Maryland Black Bears (NAHL)	—
24	(United States)	Kyle Furey	Freshman	D	6' 0" (1.83 m)	175 lb (79 kg)	2002-02-05	Marshfield, Massachusetts	Lone Star Brahmas (NAHL)	—
25	(United States)	Aidan McDonough (C)	Senior	F	6' 2" (1.88 m)	200 lb (91 kg)	1999-11-06	Milton, Massachusetts	Cedar Rapids RoughRiders (USHL)	VAN, 195th overall 2019
26	(United States)	James Davenport	Junior	D	5' 11" (1.8 m)	185 lb (84 kg)	2000-05-01	Natick, Massachusetts	Victoria Grizzlies (BCHL)	—
27	(United States)	Jack Hughes	Sophomore	F	6' 0" (1.83 m)	165 lb (75 kg)	2003-11-02	Westwood, Massachusetts	USNTDP (USHL)	LAK, 51st overall 2022
28	(United States)	Anthony Messuri	Freshman	F	5' 8" (1.73 m)	170 lb (77 kg)	2001-07-24	Arlington, Massachusetts	Utica Jr. Comets (NCDC)	—
29	(Canada)	Justin Hryckowian (A)	Sophomore	F	5' 10" (1.78 m)	195 lb (88 kg)	2001-02-23	L'Île-Bizard, Quebec	Sioux City Musketeers (USHL)	—
33	(United States)	Harrison Chesney	Freshman	G	6' 3" (1.91 m)	170 lb (77 kg)	2001-12-07	Malverne, New York	P.A.L. Jr. Islanders (NCDC)	—
37	(United States)	Grant Riley	Freshman	G	6' 4" (1.93 m)	200 lb (91 kg)	2002-08-28	Rochester, New York	Chilliwack Chiefs (BCHL)	—

== Standings ==
2022–23 Hockey East Standings
	Conference record										Overall record					
	GP	W	L	T	OTW	OTL	SW	PTS	GF	GA	GP	W	L	T	GF	GA
#4 Boston University †*	24	18	6	0	2	2	0	54	99	62	40	29	11	0	154	106
#14 Merrimack	24	16	8	0	2	4	0	50	72	52	38	23	14	1	106	89
#16 Northeastern	24	14	7	3	0	2	2	49	78	45	35	17	13	5	107	82
Connecticut	24	13	9	2	4	2	2	41	78	71	35	20	12	3	113	96
Massachusetts Lowell	24	11	10	3	2	2	3	39	56	54	36	18	15	3	89	82
Maine	24	9	11	4	1	1	1	32	62	65	36	15	16	5	92	94
Providence	24	9	9	6	3	0	2	32	64	60	37	16	14	7	103	87
Boston College	24	8	11	5	0	0	1	30	70	73	36	14	16	6	104	104
Massachusetts	24	7	14	3	1	3	2	28	55	80	35	13	17	5	94	103
New Hampshire	24	6	15	3	2	2	2	23	44	76	35	11	20	3	74	105
Vermont	24	5	16	3	2	1	1	18	36	76	36	11	20	5	69	103
Championship: March 18, 2023 † indicates regular season champion * indicates conference tournament champion (Lamoriello Trophy); Rankings: USCHO.com Top 20 Poll

== Schedule and results ==
Date	Time	Opponent^{#}	Rank^{#}	Site	TV	Decision	Result	Attendance	Record
Regular Season
October 1	7:30 PM	Long Island*	#8	Matthews Arena • Boston, Massachusetts	ESPN+	Levi	W 3–2 ^{OT}	2,579	1–0–0
October 7	7:00 PM	Vermont	#8	Matthews Arena • Boston, Massachusetts	NESN, ESPN+	Levi	W 5–2	1,726	2–0–0 (1–0–0)
October 8	7:00 PM	Vermont	#8	Matthews Arena • Boston, Massachusetts	ESPN+	Levi	W 5–0	1,692	3–0–0 (2–0–0)
October 15	7:30 PM	#15 Providence	#7	Matthews Arena • Boston, Massachusetts	ESPN+	Levi	L 1–2	4,742	3–1–0 (2–1–0)
October 18	7:00 PM	Boston College*	#12	Matthews Arena • Boston, Massachusetts	ESPN+	Levi	T 2–2 ^{OT}	2,198	3–1–1
October 22	7:00 PM	#19 Massachusetts Lowell	#12	Matthews Arena • Boston, Massachusetts	NESN, ESPN+	Riley	L 2–3	2,387	3–2–1 (2–2–0)
October 28	7:05 PM	at Maine	#15	Alfond Arena • Orono, Maine	ESPN+	Levi	T 2–2 ^{OT}	-	3–2–2 (2–2–1)
October 29	7:05 PM	at Maine	#15	Alfond Arena • Orono, Maine	ESPN+	Levi	W 4–1	3,029	4–2–2 (3–2–1)
November 4	7:00 PM	New Hampshire	#16	Matthews Arena • Boston, Massachusetts	NESN+, ESPN+	Levi	W 6–2	2,468	5–2–2 (4–2–1)
November 5	7:00 PM	at New Hampshire	#16	Whittemore Center • Durham, New Hampshire	ESPN+	Levi	W 3–0	4,337	6–2–2 (5–2–1)
November 11	7:00 PM	Boston College	#15	Matthews Arena • Boston, Massachusetts	ESPN+	Levi	T 4–4 ^{SOW}	4,724	6–2–3 (5–2–2)
November 12	7:00 PM	at Boston College	#15	Conte Forum • Chestnut Hill, Massachusetts	ESPN+	Levi	L 2–3	5,724	6–3–3 (5–3–2)
November 18	7:00 PM	at #11 Boston University	#18	Agganis Arena • Boston, Massachusetts	ESPN+	Levi	W 2–0	4,822	7–3–3 (6–3–2)
November 19	7:00 PM	#11 Boston University	#18	Matthews Arena • Boston, Massachusetts	ESPN+	Levi	L 3–4	4,724	7–4–3 (6–4–2)
November 25	7:30 PM	vs. #15 Western Michigan*	#18	Ford Ice Center Bellevue • Bellevue, Tennessee (Music City Hockey Classic)		Levi	L 4–6	1,272	7–5–3
December 3	7:00 PM	at Union*	#18	Achilles Rink • Schenectady, New York	ESPN+	Levi	L 2–3	1,621	7–6–3
December 6	7:05 PM	at Sacred Heart*		Total Mortgage Arena • Bridgeport, Connecticut	FloHockey	Levi	L 2–4	1,004	7–7–3
December 18	7:15 PM	at Long Island*		Northwell Health Ice Center • East Meadow, New York		Levi	W 4–3 ^{OT}	717	8–7–3
December 30	7:05 PM	at Bentley		Bentley Arena • Waltham, Massachusetts	FloHockey	Levi	L 1–3	1,780	8–8–3
January 1	4:00 PM	at #9 Harvard*		Bright-Landry Hockey Center • Boston, Massachusetts	ESPN+	Levi	L 4–8	3,095	8–9–3
January 7	2:30 PM	#9 Connecticut		Fenway Park • Boston, Massachusetts (Frozen Fenway)	NESN, ESPN+	Levi	W 4–1	-	9–9–3 (7–4–2)
January 14	7:05 PM	at #11 Connecticut		Toscano Family Ice Forum • Storrs, Connecticut	ESPN+	Levi	W 4–3	2,691	10–9–3 (8–4–2)
January 20	7:00 PM	at #11 Merrimack		J. Thom Lawler Rink • North Andover, Massachusetts	ESPN+	Levi	W 5–1	2,946	11–9–3 (9–4–2)
January 21	7:00 PM	#11 Merrimack		Matthews Arena • Boston, Massachusetts	NESN+, ESPN+	Levi	W 1–0	2,526	12–9–3 (10–4–2)
January 31	7:00 PM	Boston College		Matthews Arena • Boston, Massachusetts	NESN, ESPN+	Levi	W 2–1	2,621	13–9–3 (11–4–2)
February 3	7:00 PM	#14 Connecticut		Matthews Arena • Boston, Massachusetts	ESPN+	Levi	L 3–4 ^{OT}	3,021	13–10–3 (11–5–2)
Beanpot
February 6	8:00 PM	vs. #3 Boston University*	#20	TD Garden • Boston, Massachusetts (Beanpot Semifinal)		Levi	W 3–1	18,258	14–10–3
February 10	7:00 PM	at Providence	#20	Schneider Arena • Providence, Rhode Island	ESPN+	Levi	T 3–3 ^{SOW}	2,972	14–10–4 (11–5–3)
February 13	7:30 PM	vs. #9 Harvard	#16	TD Garden • Boston, Massachusetts (Beanpot Championship)	NESN	Levi	T 2–2 ^{SOW}	18,258	14–10–5
Regular Season
February 18	7:00 PM	at Vermont	#16	Gutterson Fieldhouse • Burlington, Vermont	ESPN+	Levi	W 3–0	3,069	15–10–5 (12–5–3)
February 24	7:00 PM	at Massachusetts	#15	Mullins Center • Amherst, Massachusetts	ESPN+	Levi	L 2–3	4,638	15–11–5 (12–6–3)
February 25	7:30 PM	Massachusetts	#15	Matthews Arena • Boston, Massachusetts	ESPN+	Levi	W 4–0	4,407	16–11–5 (13–6–3)
March 3	7:15 PM	at Massachusetts Lowell	#15	Tsongas Center • Lowell, Massachusetts	ESPN+	Levi	L 1–3	5,394	16–12–5 (13–7–3)
March 4	7:00 PM	Massachusetts Lowell	#15	Matthews Arena • Boston, Massachusetts	NESN, ESPN+	Levi	W 7–3	2,539	17–12–5 (14–7–3)
Hockey East Tournament
March 11	7:00 PM	Providence*	#15	Matthews Arena • Boston, Massachusetts (Quarterfinal)	ESPN+	Levi	L 1–2 ^{OT}	2,192	17–13–5
*Non-conference game. ^{#}Rankings from USCHO.com Poll. All times are in Eastern Time. Source:

== Scoring statistics ==
Name	Position	Games	Goals	Assists	Points	PIM
Aiden McDonough	LW	34	20	18	38	14
Justin Hryckowian	C	35	15	21	36	26
Gunnarwolfe Fontaine	C/LW	35	10	20	30	8
Sam Colangelo	C/RW	35	9	15	24	12
Cam Lund	C	35	7	16	23	16
Matt Choupani	C	35	10	9	19	25
Jack Williams	RW	35	6	11	17	4
Jack Hughes	C	32	5	11	16	16
Hunter McDonald	D	35	1	13	14	56
Jakov Novak	C/LW	35	8	4	12	26
Liam Walsh	LW	23	5	7	12	10
Jayden Struble	D	31	1	11	12	56
Matt Demelis	F	35	4	6	10	6
Jérémie Bucheler	D	32	1	9	10	14
Vinny Borgesi	D	32	1	9	10	24
Braden Doyle	D	23	1	7	8	6
Riley Hughes	RW	32	2	4	6	18
Jackson Dorrington	D	35	0	6	6	23
Tyler Spott	D	24	0	2	2	16
Alex Mella	LW	4	1	0	1	2
Cam Gaudette	D	8	0	1	1	4
Michael Outzen	F	16	0	1	1	0
Chase McInnis	F	1	0	0	0	0
Grant Riley	G	2	0	0	0	0
Anthony Messuri	F	2	0	0	0	0
James Davenport	D	6	0	0	0	0
Devon Levi	G	34	0	0	0	0
Total			107	201	308	377

== Goaltending statistics ==
Name	Games	Minutes	Wins	Losses	Ties	Goals against	Saves	Shut outs	SV %	GAA
Devon Levi	34	2064:37	17	12	5	77	1066	6	.933	2.24
Grant Riley	2	58:55	0	1	0	3	14	0	.824	3.06
Empty Net	-	15:16	-	-	-	2	-	-	-	-
Total	35	2138:48	17	13	5	82	1080	6	.931	2.26

== Rankings ==
Poll	Week																											
Poll	Pre	1	2	3	4	5	6	7	8	9	10	11	12	13	14	15	16	17	18	19	20	21	22	23	24	25	26	27 (Final)
USCHO.com	8	-	8	7	12	15	16	15	18	18	18	NR	NR	-	NR	NR	NR	20	NR	20	16	15	15	15	16	16	-	16
USA Today	9	9	8	8	14	17	16	15	16	18	19	NR	NR	NR	NR	NR	NR	NR	20	17	16	14	16	16	18	17	18	16

Note: USCHO did not release a poll in weeks 1, 13, or 26.

== Awards and honors ==
Player	Award	Ref
Devon Levi	Mike Richter Award	
Devon Levi	AHCA East First Team All-American	
Aidan McDonough	AHCA East First Team All-American	
Devon Levi	Hockey East Player of the Year	
Justin Hryckowian	Hockey East Best Defensive Forward	
Hunter McDonald	Hockey East Best Defensive Defenseman	
Devon Levi	Hockey East Goaltending Champion	
Devon Levi	Hockey East First Team	
Aidan McDonough	Hockey East First Team	
Justin Hryckowian	Hockey East Second Team	
Hunter McDonald	Hockey East Rookie Team	
Cam Lund	Hockey East Rookie Team	
