= 2022–23 Boston University Terriers men's ice hockey season =

Hockey East, Champion Hockey East Tournament, Champion NCAA Tournament, National Semifinal
- Conference: 1st Hockey East
- Home ice: Agganis Arena

Rankings
- USCHO.com: #4
- USA Today: #4

Record
- Overall: 29–11–0
- Conference: 18–6–0
- Home: 14–3–0
- Road: 10–4–0
- Neutral: 5–4–0

Coaches and captains
- Head coach: Jay Pandolfo
- Assistant coaches: Joe Pereira; Kim Brandvold; Brian Daccord
- Captain: Domenick Fensore
- Alternate captain(s): Case McCarthy; Jay O'Brien

The 2022–23 Boston University Terriers Men's ice hockey season was the 101st season of play for the program and 39th in Hockey East. The Terriers represented Boston University in the 2022–23 NCAA Division I men's ice hockey season, were coached by Jay Pandolfo in his 1st season, and played their home games at Agganis Arena.

== Season ==
=== Mediocre start ===
After four disappointing seasons under Albie O'Connell, former Terrier Jay Pandolfo was brought in to be the program's 12th head coach. His arrival was buoyed by the addition of several drafted players while returning most of the principle players from the previous year's team. Critically, BU entered the season with US Olympian Drew Commesso in goal and were expecting to rely on the star goalie for the bulk of the minutes. The changes for the Terriers were expected to help the team and BU was ranked in both preseason polls.

Boston University kicked off their season with an easy victory over a lesser opponent but, when they travelled to take on Michigan, the Terriers got punched in the mouth. Losing to the Wolverines, the then-#6 team in the nation, was not a black mark. Losing by 7 goals was. The embarrassing defeat was spurred on by two major penalties taken just a minute apart that allowed Michigan to score three goals and completely take over the game. The Terriers could have easily fallen in the rematch, as they handed Michigan another 5 power play opportunities, however, the BU special teams came up big and propelled them to a 3–2 win. The team continued to avoid catastrophe by earning splits in each of their next two weekends, both against ranked teams, and ended the first month of the season slightly above .500.

=== Rounding into form ===
November saw the team begin to find its consistency on the offensive side and start to pile up wins. The Terriers put together a run of 6–1 after the start of the month that included four victories over ranked teams. Key in the success at the time was the emergence of Lane Hutson as an offensive threat. The freshman defenseman was a bit undersized at just 5' 9", which likely caused him to slip into the second round of the NHL draft, but his talent and instincts were able to lift BU into being one of the top scoring teams in the nation. Hutson led BU in scoring during the season and, while being led by a defensemen typically indicates a weak offense, this was an extraordinary case. Hutson not only led the Terriers in points, he also led the entire conference in scoring. He finished the year as an All-American and managed to surpass the conference record for points by a freshman defenseman of 47 set by Brian Leetch in 1987.

=== Alternating streaks ===
After the winter break, BU opened the second half of their season with a highly anticipated match against Harvard. Despite both teams possessing high-powered offenses, the match turned into a defensive battle. BU opened the scoring just 2 minutes into the game but was unable to get another goal. Commesso turned away everything that was sent in his direction until less than five minutes were left and the Crimson were finally able to tie the score. The two cross-town rivals fought on in overtime and, with under a minute to play, team captain Domenick Fensore scored the game-winner.

BU continued to fly high and, after finishing as the runner-up for the Desert Hockey Classic, the Terriers won seven in a row, including a solid victory over old ECAC rival Cornell. As the team entered the Beanpot, they had risen up to 3rd in all the rankings and were guaranteed a spot in the NCAA tournament, barring a complete collapse. The Terriers then began to tempt fate by having their offense dry up and finish dead-last for the series. Their problems were compounded by being swept in the following week by a sinking Merrimack club and suddenly the Terriers were in free-fall. The Terriers halted their slide by finishing the season on a 4-game winning streak. While the games weren't against particularly difficult opponents, they did include Commesso's first two shutouts of the season.

=== Hockey East tournament ===
The Terriers ended the season atop the conference standings and received a bye into the quarterfinal round. With their strong finish, BU was guaranteed to make the NCAA tournament no matter what happened in the Hockey East playoffs but that didn't stop the team from acting like their season was in the balance. BU played host to cellar-dweller Vermont and completely overwhelmed the Catamounts. The Terriers outshot their opponents 50–22 in the match and, though Commesso allowed three goals, two came after BU had opened the match with a 4-goal first period.

In the semifinal against Providence, the Terriers were much less active and resoundingly outplayed by the Friars. Luckily, Providence had trouble scoring and BU only had to overcome a 0–1 deficit in the final few minutes to regulation. Once overtime began, the Terriers went on the attack, nearly doubling their shot total in just 10 minutes. Quinn Hutson's game-winner was his 14th of the season and sent them to the title game for the first time in 5 years.

With just Merrimack left in their way, the Terriers got off to a good start and forced the Warriors into taking a penalty just 5 minutes into the game. Unfortunately, Merrimack was able to score while short-handed and took the early lead. BU was gifted an extended 5-on-3 and Lane Hutson used the opportunity to tie the score. The two teams traded goals over the ensuing 39 minutes and were unable to come to a resolution in regulation. Both teams found it difficult to get shots on goal in overtime, however, Lane Hutson made his count and notched the game-winner near the 2-minute mark. The win propelled BU into the NCAA tournament with a head of steam and allowed to rise up to No. 5 in the rankings.

=== NCAA tournament ===
While The Terriers still could only garner a #2 seed, they received the best possible position by being played in the East region, close to their campus, and were set opposite to the lowest-ranked 3 seed. Western Michigan had stumbled into the tournament but still possessed a dangerous offense. BU, however, was up to the challenge and managed to quiet the Broncos' forwards. The Hutson brothers combined to score the first two goals while Matt Brown added his team-leading 16th to build a 3–0 lead. The Terriers were unable to completely silence the nation's top goal scorer, Jason Polin, but his marker was the only one that got past Commesso and Boston University skated away with a rather pedestrian victory.

For the regional final, BU got a bit of a gift by facing the #4 seed, Cornell. The familiar foes fought a defensive duel with both teams combining for just 35 shots on goal. Luckily, BU managed to earn the first marker and put pressure on the Big Red offense. With Cornell ill-suited to an attacking style, the Terriers were able to hold onto their lead for most of the second half and double their advantage about midway through the third. Cornell pulled their goalie for an extra attacker and tried to overcome the disadvantage at the end of the game. Despite getting just 3 shots in the final period, Cornell managed to sneak one into the goal but, with just 28 seconds remaining, they were unable to find another and BU advanced to their first Frozen Four in eight years.

In the Terriers' pursuit of the national title, the team would have to first get past the #1 overall seed, Minnesota. Despite being outshot in the first, BU managed to get the game's first goal. However, the Terriers got into penalty trouble and ended up giving the Gophers three power plays in the first. Minnesota scored on their second a third attempts and took a lead into the second. BU got their own man-advantage marker in the middle frame but, again, handed Minnesota three more power play opportunities, the last coming at the horn. The defense did well to stop most of those attempts but Minnesota nabbed their third power play goal early in the third. After extending their lead a few minutes later, BU desperately tried to tie the game in the final 16 minutes. Unfortunately, the team was unable to score and they were eventually forced to pull Commesso for an extra attacker. All that did was allow the Gophers to pot two empty-net goals and turn a tight game into an easy victory and BU ended its season with a dull thud.

== Departures ==
Player	Position	Nationality	Cause
Ashton Abel	Goaltender	Canada	Left program (retired)
Ty Amonte	Forward	United States	Graduate transfer to Connecticut
Markus Boguslavsky	Forward	Canada	Transferred to Canisius
Joseph Campolieto	Defenseman	United States	Graduation (retired)
Logan Cockerill	Forward	United States	Graduation (signed with BIK Karlskoga)
Braden Doyle	Defenseman	United States	Transferred to Northeastern
Max Kaufman	Forward	United States	Graduation (signed with Trois-Rivières Lions)
Robert Mastrosimone	Defenseman	United States	Transferred to Arizona State
Alex Vlasic	Defenseman	United States	Signed professional contract (Chicago Blackhawks)

== Recruiting ==
Player	Position	Nationality	Age	Notes
Lachlan Getz	Defenseman	United States	20	Northfield, IL
Ryan Greene	Forward	Canada	18	St. John's, NL; selected 57th overall in 2022
Lane Hutson	Defenseman	United States	18	Chicago, IL; selected 62nd overall in 2022
Quinn Hutson	Forward	United States	20	Chicago, IL
Devin Kaplan	Forward	United States	18	Bridgewater, NJ; selected 69th overall in 2022
Patrick Schena	Goaltender	United States	24	Andover, MA; transfer from New England
Jeremy Wilmer	Forward	United States	19	Rockville Centre, NY

== Roster ==
As of August 26, 2022.

No.	Nat.	Player	Class	Pos	Height	Weight	DoB	Hometown	Previous team	NHL rights
2	(United States)	Case McCarthy (A)	Senior	D	6' 1" (1.85 m)	202 lb (92 kg)	2001-01-09	Clarence Center, New York	USNTDP (USHL)	NJD, 118th overall 2019
3	(United States)	Tristan Amonte	Sophomore	F	6' 0" (1.83 m)	177 lb (80 kg)	2000-02-01	Norwell, Massachusetts	Penticton Vees (BCHL)	—
4	(United States)	Ty Gallagher	Sophomore	D	6' 0" (1.83 m)	190 lb (86 kg)	2003-03-06	Clarkston, Michigan	USNTDP (USHL)	BOS, 217th overall 2021
5	(United States)	Thomas Jarman	Junior	D	6' 3" (1.91 m)	190 lb (86 kg)	2001-04-09	Gibsonia, Pennsylvania	Maryland Black Bears (NAHL)	—
8	(United States)	Cade Webber	Junior	D	6' 7" (2.01 m)	215 lb (98 kg)	2001-01-05	Meadville, Pennsylvania	Penticton Vees (BCHL)	CAR, 99th overall 2019
9	(Canada)	Ryan Greene	Freshman	F	6' 1" (1.85 m)	180 lb (82 kg)	2003-10-21	Paradise, Newfoundland and Labrador	Green Bay Gamblers (USHL)	CHI, 57th overall 2022
10	(Canada)	Nick Zabaneh	Junior	F	5' 10" (1.78 m)	188 lb (85 kg)	2001-03-27	Toronto, Ontario	Green Bay Gamblers (USHL)	—
11	(United States)	Luke Tuch	Junior	F	6' 2" (1.88 m)	210 lb (95 kg)	2002-03-07	Baldwinsville, New York	USNTDP (USHL)	MTL, 47th overall 2020
12	(United States)	Jamie Armstrong	Senior	F	6' 2" (1.88 m)	192 lb (87 kg)	1998-08-07	Warwick, Rhode Island	Boston Junior Bruins (NCDC)	—
13	(United States)	Dylan Peterson	Junior	F	6' 4" (1.93 m)	203 lb (92 kg)	2002-01-08	Roseville, California	USNTDP (USHL)	STL, 86th overall 2020
14	(United States)	Sean Driscoll	Senior	D	6' 2" (1.88 m)	203 lb (92 kg)	1998-07-02	Mequon, Wisconsin	Janesville Jets (NAHL)	—
15	(United States)	Lachlan Getz	Freshman	D	6' 3" (1.91 m)	190 lb (86 kg)	2002-02-01	Northfield, Illinois	Chilliwack Chiefs (BCHL)	—
16	(United States)	Jeremy Wilmer	Freshman	F	5' 8" (1.73 m)	155 lb (70 kg)	2003-08-16	Rockville Centre, New York	Tri-City Storm (USHL)	—
17	(United States)	Quinn Hutson	Freshman	F	5' 10" (1.78 m)	170 lb (77 kg)	2002-01-01	North Barrington, Illinois	Muskegon Lumberjacks (USHL)	—
18	(United States)	Jay O'Brien (A)	Senior	F	6' 0" (1.83 m)	188 lb (85 kg)	1999-11-04	Hingham, Massachusetts	Penticton Vees (BCHL)	PHI, 19th overall 2018
19	(United States)	Jack Page	Sophomore	D	6' 4" (1.93 m)	194 lb (88 kg)	2001-11-27	West Chester, Pennsylvania	Rockets Hockey Club (NCDC)	—
20	(United States)	Lane Hutson	Freshman	D	5' 9" (1.75 m)	155 lb (70 kg)	2004-02-14	North Barrington, Illinois	USNTDP (USHL)	MTL, 62nd overall 2022
21	(United States)	Devin Kaplan	Freshman	F	6' 3" (1.91 m)	204 lb (93 kg)	2004-01-10	Bridgewater, New Jersey	USNTDP (USHL)	PHI, 69th overall 2022
22	(United States)	Brian Carrabes	Sophomore	F	5' 10" (1.78 m)	170 lb (77 kg)	2001-08-01	North Andover, Massachusetts	Sioux City Musketeers (USHL)	—
23	(United States)	Domenick Fensore (C)	Senior	D	5' 9" (1.75 m)	170 lb (77 kg)	2001-09-07	Thornwood, New York	USNTDP (USHL)	CAR, 90th overall 2019
25	(Canada)	Sam Stevens	Senior	F	6' 1" (1.85 m)	186 lb (84 kg)	2000-04-27	Montreal, Quebec	Sioux Falls Stampede (USHL)	—
27	(United States)	John Copeland	Senior	D	6' 6" (1.98 m)	215 lb (98 kg)	1999-03-03	Wellesley, Massachusetts	Carleton Place Canadians (CCHL)	—
28	(Canada)	Ethan Phillips	Senior	F	5' 10" (1.78 m)	160 lb (73 kg)	2001-05-07	Dartmouth, Nova Scotia	Sioux Falls Stampede (USHL)	DET, 97th overall 2019
29	(United States)	Drew Commesso	Junior	G	6' 2" (1.88 m)	180 lb (82 kg)	2002-07-19	Norwell, Massachusetts	USNTDP (USHL)	CHI, 46th overall 2020
30	(United States)	Patrick Schena	Graduate	G	6' 1" (1.85 m)	220 lb (100 kg)	1998-01-13	Medford, Massachusetts	New England (CCC)	—
31	(Canada)	Vinny Duplessis	Junior	G	6' 1" (1.85 m)	175 lb (79 kg)	1999-03-19	Quebec City, Quebec	Whitecourt Wolverines (AJHL)	—
32	(Sweden)	Wilmer Skoog	Senior	F	6' 2" (1.88 m)	200 lb (91 kg)	1999-07-17	Tyresö, Sweden	Maryland Black Bears (NAHL)	—
37	(United States)	Matt Brown	Senior	F	5' 9" (1.75 m)	190 lb (86 kg)	1999-08-09	Wood-Ridge, New Jersey	Massachusetts Lowell (HEA)	—

== Standings ==
2022–23 Hockey East Standings
	Conference record										Overall record					
	GP	W	L	T	OTW	OTL	SW	PTS	GF	GA	GP	W	L	T	GF	GA
#4 Boston University †*	24	18	6	0	2	2	0	54	99	62	40	29	11	0	154	106
#14 Merrimack	24	16	8	0	2	4	0	50	72	52	38	23	14	1	106	89
#16 Northeastern	24	14	7	3	0	2	2	49	78	45	35	17	13	5	107	82
Connecticut	24	13	9	2	4	2	2	41	78	71	35	20	12	3	113	96
Massachusetts Lowell	24	11	10	3	2	2	3	39	56	54	36	18	15	3	89	82
Maine	24	9	11	4	1	1	1	32	62	65	36	15	16	5	92	94
Providence	24	9	9	6	3	0	2	32	64	60	37	16	14	7	103	87
Boston College	24	8	11	5	0	0	1	30	70	73	36	14	16	6	104	104
Massachusetts	24	7	14	3	1	3	2	28	55	80	35	13	17	5	94	103
New Hampshire	24	6	15	3	2	2	2	23	44	76	35	11	20	3	74	105
Vermont	24	5	16	3	2	1	1	18	36	76	36	11	20	5	69	103
Championship: March 18, 2023 † indicates regular season champion * indicates conference tournament champion (Lamoriello Trophy); Rankings: USCHO.com Top 20 Poll

== Schedule and results ==
Date	Time	Opponent^{#}	Rank^{#}	Site	TV	Decision	Result	Attendance	Record
Regular Season
October 1	7:00 PM	Bentley*	#12	Agganis Arena • Boston, Massachusetts	ESPN+	Commesso	W 8–2	5,504	1–0–0
October 8	7:00 PM	Waterloo*	#9	Agganis Arena • Boston, Massachusetts (Exhibition)	ESPN+	Commesso	W 7–1	2,512	
October 14	7:00 PM	at #6 Michigan*	#9	Yost Ice Arena • Ann Arbor, Michigan	BTN+	Commesso	L 2–9	5,800	1–1–0
October 16	5:00 PM	at #6 Michigan*	#9	Yost Ice Arena • Ann Arbor, Michigan	BTN+	Duplessis	W 3–2	5,800	2–1–0
October 21	7:00 PM	#14 Connecticut	#9	Agganis Arena • Boston, Massachusetts	ESPN+	Duplessis	L 3–4 ^{OT}	4,546	2–2–0 (0–1–0)
October 22	7:00 PM	#14 Connecticut	#9	Agganis Arena • Boston, Massachusetts	ESPN+	Duplessis	W 5–2	4,864	3–2–0 (1–1–0)
October 28	7:15 PM	at #18 Massachusetts Lowell	#9	Tsongas Center • Lowell, Massachusetts	ESPN+	Duplessis	L 1–2	5,040	3–3–0 (1–2–0)
October 29	7:00 PM	#18 Massachusetts Lowell	#9	Agganis Arena • Boston, Massachusetts	ESPN+	Commesso	W 2–1 ^{OT}	3,119	4–3–0 (2–2–0)
November 11	7:00 PM	at #11 Massachusetts	#14	Mullins Center • Amherst, Massachusetts	NESN, ESPN+	Commesso	W 7–2	5,197	5–3–0 (3–2–0)
November 12	7:00 PM	#11 Massachusetts	#14	Agganis Arena • Boston, Massachusetts	ESPN+	Commesso	W 5–1	4,869	6–3–0 (4–2–0)
November 18	7:00 PM	#18 Northeastern	#11	Agganis Arena • Boston, Massachusetts	ESPN+	Commesso	L 0–2	4,822	6–4–0 (4–3–0)
November 19	7:00 PM	at #18 Northeastern	#11	Matthews Arena • Boston, Massachusetts	ESPN+	Commesso	W 4–3	4,724	7–4–0 (5–3–0)
November 23	5:00 PM	#19 Notre Dame*	#11	Agganis Arena • Boston, Massachusetts	ESPNU	Commesso	W 5–2	3,912	8–4–0
November 26	2:00 PM	USNTDP*	#11	Agganis Arena • Boston, Massachusetts (Exhibition)	ESPN+	Duplessis	L 5–6 ^{OT}	2,759	
December 2	7:00 PM	at New Hampshire	#9	Whittemore Center • Durham, New Hampshire	NESN+, ESPN+	Duplessis	W 6–3	4,396	9–4–0 (6–3–0)
December 3	6:00 PM	New Hampshire	#9	Agganis Arena • Boston, Massachusetts	ESPN+	Duplessis	W 3–0	3,574	10–4–0 (7–3–0)
December 9	7:00 PM	at Boston College	#7	Conte Forum • Chestnut Hill, Massachusetts (Rivalry)	ESPNews	Commesso	L 6–9	7,884	10–5–0 (7–4–0)
December 11	2:05 PM	at #8 Connecticut	#7	XL Center • Hartford, Connecticut	ESPN+	Commesso	W 3–2	4,560	11–5–0 (8–4–0)
December 30	7:00 PM	vs. #9 Harvard*	#8	Walter Brown Arena • Boston, Massachusetts	ESPN2	Commesso	W 2–1 ^{OT}	3,277	12–5–0
Desert Hockey Classic
January 6	5:30 PM	vs. Air Force*	#6	Mullett Arena • Tempe, Arizona (Desert Hockey Classic Semifinal)		Commesso	W 5–1	-	13–5–0
January 7	5:30 PM	vs. #16 Michigan Tech*	#6	Mullett Arena • Tempe, Arizona (Desert Hockey Classic Championship)		Commesso	L 2–3	-	13–6–0
January 11	7:00 PM	#19 Massachusetts	#7	Agganis Arena • Boston, Massachusetts	ESPN+	Commesso	W 6–2	2,721	14–6–0 (9–4–0)
January 14	4:00 PM	#15 Cornell*	#7	Agganis Arena • Boston, Massachusetts (Rivalry)	ESPN+	Commesso	W 4–3	5,346	15–6–0
January 20	7:00 PM	Maine	#5	Agganis Arena • Boston, Massachusetts (Rivalry)	NESN, ESPN+	Commesso	W 5–1	3,703	16–6–0 (10–4–0)
January 21	6:00 PM	Maine	#5	Agganis Arena • Boston, Massachusetts (Rivalry)	ESPN+	Duplessis	W 9–6	3,637	17–6–0 (11–4–0)
January 27	7:00 PM	Boston College	#4	Agganis Arena • Boston, Massachusetts (Rivalry)	NESN, ESPN+	Commesso	W 6–3	6,150	18–6–0 (12–4–0)
January 28	7:00 PM	at Boston College	#4	Conte Forum • Chestnut Hill, Massachusetts (Rivalry)	NESN+, ESPN+	Commesso	W 3–1	7,000	19–6–0 (13–4–0)
February 3	7:00 PM	at Maine	#3	Alfond Arena • Orono, Maine (Rivalry)	ESPN+	Commesso	W 5–3	4,325	20–6–0 (14–4–0)
Beanpot
February 6	8:00 PM	vs. #20 Northeastern*	#3	TD Garden • Boston, Massachusetts (Beanpot Semifinal)	NESN	Commesso	L 1–3	17,850	20–7–0
February 13	4:30 PM	vs. Boston College*	#5	TD Garden • Boston, Massachusetts (Beanpot Consolation, Rivalry)		Commesso	L 2–4	-	20–8–0
February 17	7:00 PM	at #20 Merrimack	#5	J. Thom Lawler Rink • North Andover, Massachusetts	ESPN+	Commesso	L 1–4	2,946	20–9–0 (14–5–0)
February 18	6:00 PM	#20 Merrimack	#5	Agganis Arena • Boston, Massachusetts	ESPN+	Duplessis	L 3–4 ^{OT}	4,785	20–10–0 (14–6–0)
February 24	7:00 PM	at Vermont	#9	Gutterson Fieldhouse • Burlington, Vermont	ESPN+	Commesso	W 5–3	2,795	21–10–0 (15–6–0)
February 25	7:30 PM	at Vermont	#9	Gutterson Fieldhouse • Burlington, Vermont	ESPN+	Commesso	W 3–0	2,799	22–10–0 (16–6–0)
March 3	7:00 PM	Providence	#7	Agganis Arena • Boston, Massachusetts	NESN+, ESPN+	Commesso	W 6–4	4,846	23–10–0 (17–6–0)
March 4	7:00 PM	at Providence	#7	Schneider Arena • Providence, Rhode Island	NESN+, ESPN+	Commesso	W 2–0	2,476	24–10–0 (18–6–0)
Hockey East Tournament
March 11	4:30 PM	Vermont*	#5	Agganis Arena • Boston, Massachusetts (Quarterfinal)	NESN, ESPN+	Commesso	W 7–3	3,915	25–10–0
March 17	4:00 PM	vs. Providence*	#5	TD Garden • Boston, Massachusetts (Semifinal)	NESN, ESPN+	Commesso	W 2–1 ^{OT}	13,187	26–10–0
March 18	7:00 PM	vs. #14 Merrimack*	#5	TD Garden • Boston, Massachusetts (Championship)	NESN, ESPN+	Commesso	W 3–2 ^{OT}	14,306	27–10–0
NCAA Tournament
March 23	2:00 PM	vs. #9 Western Michigan*	#5	SNHU Arena • Manchester, New Hampshire (East Regional Semifinal)	ESPNU	Commesso	W 5–1	3,631	28–10–0
March 25	4:00 PM	vs. #12 Cornell*	#5	SNHU Arena • Manchester, New Hampshire (East Regional Final; Rivalry)	ESPNU	Commesso	W 2–1	7,143	29–10–0
April 6	5:00 PM	vs. #1 Minnesota*	#5	Amalie Arena • Tampa, Florida (National Semifinal)	ESPN2	Commesso	L 2–6	19,119	29–11–0
*Non-conference game. ^{#}Rankings from USCHO.com Poll. All times are in Eastern Time. Source:

== Scoring statistics ==
Name	Position	Games	Goals	Assists	Points	PIM
Lane Hutson	D	39	15	33	48	26
Matt Brown	LW	39	16	31	47	6
Jeremy Wilmer	LW	37	9	23	32	16
Jay O'Brien	C	39	8	24	32	42
Wilmer Skoog	C	37	16	15	31	28
Domenick Fensore	D	37	9	22	31	30
Ryan Greene	C	38	9	22	31	20
Quinn Hutson	F	39	15	13	28	24
Devin Kaplan	RW	40	10	13	23	49
Ty Gallagher	D	40	3	18	21	24
Luke Tuch	LW	40	9	11	20	21
Sam Stevens	F	40	8	10	18	26
Dylan Peterson	C	39	5	13	18	26
Case McCarthy	D	35	3	12	15	14
Jamie Armstrong	LW	29	5	8	13	6
Nicholas Zabaneh	C	35	8	4	12	14
Ethan Phillips	C/RW	29	4	7	11	14
Cade Webber	D	40	1	5	6	29
Brian Carrabes	F	11	1	1	2	0
Vinny Duplessis	G	10	0	1	1	0
Patrick Schena	G	1	0	0	0	0
Sean Driscoll	D	1	0	0	0	0
Jack Page	D	4	0	0	0	0
Thomas Jarman	D	4	0	0	0	0
Tristan Amonte	F	16	0	0	0	4
Lachlan Getz	D	16	0	0	0	0
John Copeland	F/D	27	0	0	0	0
Drew Commesso	G	34	0	0	0	0
Total			154	285	439	419

== Goaltending statistics ==
Name	Games	Minutes	Wins	Losses	Ties	Goals Against	Saves	Shut Outs	SV %	GAA
Patrick Schena	1	0:09	0	0	0	0	0	0	-	0.00
Drew Commesso	34	1924:29	24	8	0	79	823	2	.915	2.46
Vinny Duplessis	10	484:39	5	3	0	20	186	1	.903	2.48
Empty Net	-	17:01	-	-	-	7	-	-	-	-
Total	40	2428:18	29	11	0	106	1009	3	.905	2.62

== Rankings ==
Poll	Week																											
Poll	Pre	1	2	3	4	5	6	7	8	9	10	11	12	13	14	15	16	17	18	19	20	21	22	23	24	25	26	27 (Final)
USCHO.com	12	-	9	9	9	9	11	14	11	11	9	7	8	-	6	7	5	4 (2)	3 (3)	3 (8)	5 (1)	9	7	5	5	5 (1)	-	4
USA Today	14	14	12	9	11	9	13	14	9	11	7	6	7	7	6	7	5	5 (1)	3 (7)	3 (3)	5	8	7	6	5	5 (2)	4	4

Note: USCHO did not release a poll in weeks 1, 13, or 26.

== Awards and honors ==
Player	Award	Ref
Lane Hutson	AHCA East First Team All-American	
Matt Brown	AHCA East Second Team All-American	
Lane Hutson	Hockey East Rookie of the Year	
Lane Hutson	Hockey East Three-Stars Award	
Lane Hutson	Hockey East Scoring Champion	
Jay Pandolfo	Bob Kullen Coach of the Year Award	
Lane Hutson	William Flynn Tournament Most Valuable Player	
Domenick Fensore	Hockey East First Team	
Lane Hutson	Hockey East First Team	
Matt Brown	Hockey East First Team	
Wilmer Skoog	Hockey East Third Team	
Lane Hutson	Hockey East Rookie Team	
Ryan Greene	Hockey East Rookie Team	
Drew Commesso	Hockey East All-Tournament Team	
Lane Hutson	Hockey East All-Tournament Team	
Devin Kaplan	Hockey East All-Tournament Team	
Dylan Peterson	Hockey East All-Tournament Team	

== Players drafted into the NHL ==
=== 2023 NHL entry draft ===
Round	Pick	Player	NHL team
1	11	Tom Willander ^{†}	Vancouver Canucks
3	71	Brandon Svoboda ^{†}	San Jose Sharks
3	86	Gavin McCarthy ^{†}	Buffalo Sabres
6	171	Aiden Celebrini ^{†}	Vancouver Canucks
7	193	Jack Harvey ^{†}	Tampa Bay Lightning

† incoming freshman
