= 2022–23 Maine Black Bears men's ice hockey season =

- Conference: T–6th Hockey East
- Home ice: Alfond Arena

Rankings
- USCHO: NR
- USA Today: NR

Record
- Overall: 15–16–5
- Conference: 9–11–4
- Home: 11–7–1
- Road: 4–9–4

Coaches and captains
- Head coach: Ben Barr
- Assistant coaches: Alfie Michaud; Jason Fortier
- Captain: Jakub Sirota
- Alternate captain(s): David Breazeale; Lynden Breen; Ben Poisson

The 2022–23 Maine Black Bears Men's ice hockey season was the 48th season of play for the program, the 46th season competing at the Division I level, and the 39th in the Hockey East conference. The Black Bears represented the University of Maine and played their home games at Alfond Arena, and were coached by Ben Barr, in his 2nd season as head coach.

== Season ==
After a very trying season, Maine was looking to get back on track in '23. The first hurdle for the team was dealing with the sheer amount of new faces as more than half of the previous season's players had departed. While the Black Bears would be getting a new starting goaltender, most of their top offensive players were back, which at least gave the team a foundation for this season. Early on, the team performed well and managed to take down #3 Quinnipiac with a rather stunning 4–0 victory. That surprise win, however, was the start of an 8-game stretch where Maine faced all ranked opponents. Unfortunately, the team was unable to win any of the other games and plummeted to the bottom of the conference standings. Several of the games in that stretch were close but the Bears' offense wasn't quite up to par.

The team ended the skid after Thanksgiving and were finally able to find some consistency in their game. They finished out the first half of the season with four consecutive wins but they had a daunting task before them. With little chance to receive an at-large bid, Maine was playing for pride in the second half. With Lynden Breen leading the way, The Black Bears posted several more impressive wins, taking four games from ranked teams. Aside from the three matches against Boston University, Maine looked good even in defeat and managed to climb their way up to 6th in the conference.

The Black Bears entered the postseason in a decent position, facing off against Hockey East bottom-feeder Vermont. Maine got into the lead twice and controlled the game for the first 45 minutes or so. Unfortunately, a strong third period from the Catamounts saw the momentum swing and suddenly the Bears were trailing. Down a goal, Maine got a power play with just under 2 minutes left in regulation. Victor Östman was pulled for an extra attacker to give the Black Bears a de facto 2-man advantage. However, Vermont managed to score into the empty net and seal the game, ending Maine's season.

== Departures ==
Player	Position	Nationality	Cause
Adrien Bisson	Defenseman	Canada	Transferred to Mercyhurst
Simon Butala	Defenseman	United States	Graduation (retired)
Adam Dawe	Forward	Canada	Graduate transfer to Connecticut
A. J. Drobot	Forward	United States	Left program (retired)
Tim Gould	Defenseman	Canada	Left program (retired)
Edward Lindelöw	Forward	Sweden	Graduation (signed with Västerviks IK)
Brad Morrissey	Forward	Canada	Left program (retired)
Jonny Mulera	Forward	United States	Left program (retired)
Tristan Poissant	Forward	Canada	Left program (retired)
Jack Quinlivan	Forward	United States	Graduation (signed with Worcester Railers)
Jacob Schmidt-Svejstrup	Forward	Denmark	Graduate transfer to Clarkson
Cameron Spicer	Defenseman	United States	Graduation (retired)
Keenan Suthers	Forward	Canada	Graduation (signed with Toronto Marlies)
Matthew Thiessen	Goaltender	Canada	Transferred to Minnesota Duluth
Perry Winfree	Defenseman	United States	Left program (retired)
Emil Westerlund	Forward	Sweden	Graduation (signed with Almtuna IS)

== Recruiting ==
Player	Position	Nationality	Age	Notes
Luke Antonacci	Defenseman	United States	19	Princeton, NJ
Grayson Arnott	Defenseman	Canada	21	Toronto, ON
Aidan Carney	Forward	United States	21	Paradise Valley, AZ; joined mid-season
Brandon Chabrier	Defenseman	United States	20	Bayville, NY
Samuel Duerr	Defenseman	United States	20	Chicago, IL
Thomas Freel	Forward	Scotland	21	Aberdeen, SCO
Cole Hanson	Forward	United States	22	Grand Forks, ND; transfer from Colgate
Didrik Henbrant	Forward	Sweden	24	Sturefors, SWE; transfer from Alaska
Brandon Holt	Defenseman	United States	21	Grand Forks, ND
Thomas Killian Kiecker-Olson	Forward	United States	21	Andover, MN
Robert Kincaid	Defenseman	Canada	20	Barrhead, AB
Parker Lindauer	Forward	United States	21	Madison, WI
Michael Mancinelli	Forward	United States	21	Northville, MI
Justin Michaelian	Forward	United States	24	Wixom, MI; graduate transfer from Ferris State
Jacob Mucitelli	Goaltender	United States	22	Deerfield, NY; transfer from Clarkson
Reid Pabich	Forward	United States	20	Verona, WI
Félix Trudeau	Forward	Canada	20	Terrebonne, QC

== Roster ==
As of January 4, 2023.

No.	Nat.	Player	Class	Pos	Height	Weight	DoB	Hometown	Previous team	NHL rights
2	(Czech Republic)	Jakub Sirota (C)	Graduate	D	6' 2" (1.88 m)	208 lb (94 kg)	1998-12-20	Kroměříž, Czech Republic	Lone Star Brahmas (NAHL)	—
3	(United States)	Luke Antonacci	Freshman	D	5' 9" (1.75 m)	175 lb (79 kg)	2002-11-26	Princeton, New Jersey	Sioux City Musketeers (USHL)	—
4	(United States)	Brandon Holt	Freshman	D	5' 11" (1.8 m)	185 lb (84 kg)	2001-04-30	Grand Forks, North Dakota	New Mexico Ice Wolves (NAHL)	—
5	(United States)	Samuel Duerr	Sophomore	D	6' 1" (1.85 m)	201 lb (91 kg)	2002-03-22	Chicago, Illinois	St. Cloud Norsemen (NAHL)	—
6	(Sweden)	Didrik Henbrandt	Junior	F	5' 10" (1.78 m)	180 lb (82 kg)	1998-04-10	Sturefors, Sweden	Alaska (NCAA)	—
7	(Canada)	Grant Hebert	Graduate	F	6' 3" (1.91 m)	192 lb (87 kg)	1997-05-22	St. Andrews West, Ontario	Robert Morris (AHA)	—
10	(United States)	Cole Hanson	Sophomore	F	5' 11" (1.8 m)	175 lb (79 kg)	2000-09-19	Grand Forks, North Dakota	Colgate (ECAC)	—
11	(Canada)	Donavan Villeneuve-Houle	Junior	F	6' 0" (1.83 m)	185 lb (84 kg)	1999-11-04	Montreal, Quebec	Flin Flon Bombers (SJHL)	—
12	(Canada)	Ben Poisson (A)	Senior	F	6' 1" (1.85 m)	195 lb (88 kg)	1999-08-31	Vancouver, British Columbia	Prince George Spruce Kings (BCHL)	—
14	(United States)	Michael Mancinelli	Junior	F	5' 9" (1.75 m)	180 lb (82 kg)	2001-06-28	Northville, Michigan	Arizona State (NCAA)	—
15	(United States)	Brandon Chabrier	Freshman	D	6' 0" (1.83 m)	178 lb (81 kg)	2002-07-19	Bayville, New York	Madison Capitols (USHL)	—
16	(United States)	Aidan Carney	Freshman	F	6' 4" (1.93 m)	195 lb (88 kg)	2001-09-08	Paradise Valley, Arizona	Amarillo Wranglers (NAHL)	—
17	(Canada)	Félix Trudeau	Freshman	F	6' 2" (1.88 m)	185 lb (84 kg)	2002-09-24	Terrebonne, Quebec	West Kelowna Warriors (BCHL)	—
18	(United States)	Parker Lindauer	Freshman	D	6' 2" (1.88 m)	185 lb (84 kg)	2001-05-17	Madison, Wisconsin	Muskegon Lumberjacks (USHL)	—
20	(Canada)	Robert Kincaid	Freshman	D	6' 2" (1.88 m)	185 lb (84 kg)	2002-05-13	Barrhead, Alberta	Camrose Kodiaks (AJHL)	—
21	(United States)	Reid Pabich	Freshman	F	5' 11" (1.8 m)	175 lb (79 kg)	2001-10-05	Verona, Wisconsin	Madison Capitols (USHL)	—
22	(Canada)	Dawson Bruneski	Senior	F	5' 11" (1.8 m)	195 lb (88 kg)	1999-06-24	Camrose, Alberta	Drumheller Dragons (AJHL)	—
23	(Canada)	Grayson Arnott	Freshman	D	5' 9" (1.75 m)	165 lb (75 kg)	2001-06-14	Toronto, Ontario	Penticton Vees (BCHL)	—
24	(Canada)	Nolan Renwick	Sophomore	F	6' 3" (1.91 m)	205 lb (93 kg)	2001-02-16	Milestone, Saskatchewan	Omaha Lancers (USHL)	—
26	(Scotland)	Thomas Freel	Freshman	F	5' 11" (1.8 m)	180 lb (82 kg)	2001-06-26	Aberdeen, Scotland	Ottawa Jr. Senators (CCHL)	—
27	(Canada)	Lynden Breen (A)	Junior	F	5' 9" (1.75 m)	168 lb (76 kg)	2001-05-31	Grand Bay-Westfield, New Brunswick	Fargo Force (USHL)	—
28	(United States)	Killian Kiecker-Olson	Freshman	F	6' 1" (1.85 m)	190 lb (86 kg)	2001-01-19	Andover, Minnesota	Lincoln Stars (USHL)	—
32	(Sweden)	Victor Östman	Junior	G	6' 4" (1.93 m)	205 lb (93 kg)	2000-10-03	Danderyd, Sweden	Chicago Steel (USHL)	—
33	(United States)	Connor Androlewicz	Junior	G	6' 2" (1.88 m)	194 lb (88 kg)	2000-11-28	St. Louis, Missouri	Lincoln Stars (USHL)	—
34	(United States)	Justin Michaelian	Graduate	F	6' 0" (1.83 m)	185 lb (84 kg)	1997-12-07	Wixom, Michigan	Ferris State (CCHA)	—
35	(United States)	Jacob Mucitelli	Sophomore	G	6' 3" (1.91 m)	195 lb (88 kg)	2000-03-24	Deerfield, New York	Clarkson (ECAC)	—
36	(United States)	Matthew Fawcett	Senior	F	5' 6" (1.68 m)	152 lb (69 kg)	1999-04-22	Lincoln, Rhode Island	Quinnipiac (ECAC)	—
37	(United States)	David Breazeale (A)	Sophomore	D	6' 4" (1.93 m)	201 lb (91 kg)	2000-04-22	Grandville, Michigan	Shreveport Mudbugs (NAHL)	—

== Standings ==
2022–23 Hockey East Standings
	Conference record										Overall record					
	GP	W	L	T	OTW	OTL	SW	PTS	GF	GA	GP	W	L	T	GF	GA
#4 Boston University †*	24	18	6	0	2	2	0	54	99	62	40	29	11	0	154	106
#14 Merrimack	24	16	8	0	2	4	0	50	72	52	38	23	14	1	106	89
#16 Northeastern	24	14	7	3	0	2	2	49	78	45	35	17	13	5	107	82
Connecticut	24	13	9	2	4	2	2	41	78	71	35	20	12	3	113	96
Massachusetts Lowell	24	11	10	3	2	2	3	39	56	54	36	18	15	3	89	82
Maine	24	9	11	4	1	1	1	32	62	65	36	15	16	5	92	94
Providence	24	9	9	6	3	0	2	32	64	60	37	16	14	7	103	87
Boston College	24	8	11	5	0	0	1	30	70	73	36	14	16	6	104	104
Massachusetts	24	7	14	3	1	3	2	28	55	80	35	13	17	5	94	103
New Hampshire	24	6	15	3	2	2	2	23	44	76	35	11	20	3	74	105
Vermont	24	5	16	3	2	1	1	18	36	76	36	11	20	5	69	103
Championship: March 18, 2023 † indicates regular season champion * indicates conference tournament champion (Lamoriello Trophy); Rankings: USCHO.com Top 20 Poll

== Schedule and results ==
Date	Time	Opponent^{#}	Rank^{#}	Site	TV	Decision	Result	Attendance	Record
Exhibition
October 1	7:05 PM	Prince Edward Island*		Alfond Arena • Orono, Maine (Exhibition)		Östman	W 1–0	3,856	
Ice Breaker Tournament
October 7	9:05 PM	at Air Force*		Cadet Ice Arena • Colorado Springs, Colorado (Ice Breaker Tournament)	FloHockey	Mucitelli	W 4–1	1,682	1–0–0
October 8	8:00 PM	at #1 Denver*		Magness Arena • Denver, Colorado (Ice Breaker Tournament)	Altitude	Östman	L 1–3	5,447	1–1–0
Regular Season
October 15	5:05 PM	at Bentley*		Bentley Arena • Waltham, Massachusetts	FloHockey	Mucitelli	L 1–5	1,600	1–2–0
October 22	4:00 PM	#3 Quinnipiac*		Alfond Arena • Orono, Maine	ESPN+	Östman	W 4–0	3,776	2–2–0
October 23	4:00 PM	#3 Quinnipiac*		Alfond Arena • Orono, Maine	ESPN+	Östman	L 2–6	2,915	2–3–0
October 28	7:05 PM	#15 Northeastern		Alfond Arena • Orono, Maine	ESPN+	Östman	T 2–2 ^{SOW}	-	2–3–1 (0–0–1)
October 29	7:05 PM	#15 Northeastern		Alfond Arena • Orono, Maine	ESPN+	Mucitelli	L 1–4	3,029	2–4–1 (0–1–1)
November 4	7:05 PM	at #8 Connecticut		XL Center • Hartford, Connecticut	ESPN+	Östman	L 2–3 ^{OT}	3,020	2–5–1 (0–2–1)
November 5	4:05 PM	at #8 Connecticut		XL Center • Hartford, Connecticut	ESPN+	Östman	L 2–3	2,993	2–6–1 (0–3–1)
November 11	4:00 PM	at #19 Merrimack		J. Thom Lawler Rink • North Andover, Massachusetts	ESPN+	Östman	L 0–1	2,186	2–7–1 (0–4–1)
November 12	7:00 PM	at #19 Merrimack		J. Thom Lawler Rink • North Andover, Massachusetts	ESPN+	Östman	L 3–5	2,488	2–8–1 (0–5–1)
November 26	2:05 PM	American International*		Alfond Arena • Orono, Maine	ESPN+	Östman	W 5–1	2,910	3–8–1
December 2	7:00 PM	at Vermont		Gutterson Fieldhouse • Burlington, Vermont	ESPN+	Östman	W 3–1	2,254	4–8–1 (1–5–1)
December 3	5:00 PM	at Vermont		Gutterson Fieldhouse • Burlington, Vermont	ESPN+	Östman	W 5–1	2,613	5–8–1 (2–5–1)
December 10	2:05 PM	Canisius*		Alfond Arena • Orono, Maine	ESPN+	Östman	W 3–0	3,333	6–8–1
December 30	7:00 PM	at Colgate*		Class of 1965 Arena • Hamilton, New York	ESPN+	Mucitelli	L 2–5	940	6–9–1
December 31	4:00 PM	at Colgate*		Class of 1965 Arena • Hamilton, New York	ESPN+	Androlewicz	T 1–1 ^{OT}	833	6–9–2
January 6	7:05 PM	Alaska Anchorage*		Alfond Arena • Orono, Maine	ESPN+	Östman	W 1–0	3,180	7–9–2
January 7	5:05 PM	Alaska Anchorage*		Alfond Arena • Orono, Maine	ESPN+	Östman	W 4–3 ^{OT}	3,522	8–9–2
January 13	7:05 PM	#16 Massachusetts Lowell		Alfond Arena • Orono, Maine	ESPN+	Östman	L 1–2	3,150	8–10–2 (2–6–1)
January 14	7:05 PM	#16 Massachusetts Lowell		Alfond Arena • Orono, Maine	ESPN+	Östman	W 5–3	4,039	9–10–2 (3–6–1)
January 20	7:00 PM	at #5 Boston University		Agganis Arena • Boston, Massachusetts (Rivalry)	NESN, ESPN+	Östman	L 1–5	3,703	9–11–2 (3–7–1)
January 21	6:00 PM	at #5 Boston University		Agganis Arena • Boston, Massachusetts (Rivalry)	ESPN+	Androlewicz	L 6–9	3,637	9–12–2 (3–8–1)
January 27	7:05 PM	#17 Providence		Alfond Arena • Orono, Maine	ESPN+	Östman	W 3–2	3,476	10–12–2 (4–8–1)
January 28	7:05 PM	#17 Providence		Alfond Arena • Orono, Maine	ESPN+	Östman	W 3–0	4,441	11–12–2 (5–8–1)
February 3	7:05 PM	#3 Boston University		Alfond Arena • Orono, Maine (Rivalry)	ESPN+	Östman	L 3–5	4,325	11–13–2 (5–9–1)
February 5	2:05 PM	#15 Merrimack		Alfond Arena • Orono, Maine	ESPN+	Östman	W 3–2 ^{OT}	3,770	12–13–2 (6–9–1)
February 10	7:00 PM	at Boston College		Conte Forum • Chestnut Hill, Massachusetts	ESPN+, NESN	Östman	W 3–1	4,175	13–13–2 (7–9–1)
February 12	2:05 PM	at #17 Massachusetts Lowell		Tsongas Center • Lowell, Massachusetts	ESPN+	Östman	T 1–1 ^{SOL}	4,019	13–13–3 (7–9–2)
February 17	7:00 PM	at New Hampshire		Whittemore Center • Durham, New Hampshire (Rivalry)	NESN, ESPN+	Östman	T 2–2 ^{SOL}	6,501	13–13–4 (7–9–3)
February 18	7:00 PM	at New Hampshire		Whittemore Center • Durham, New Hampshire (Rivalry)	ESPN+	Östman	T 0–0 ^{SOL}	6,501	13–13–5 (7–9–4)
February 24	7:05 PM	Boston College		Alfond Arena • Orono, Maine	ESPN+	Östman	W 6–3	4,870	14–13–5 (8–9–4)
February 25	7:05 PM	Boston College		Alfond Arena • Orono, Maine	ESPN+	Östman	W 2–1	5,045	15–13–5 (9–9–4)
March 3	7:05 PM	Massachusetts		Alfond Arena • Orono, Maine	ESPN+	Östman	L 2–5	4,272	15–14–5 (9–10–4)
March 4	7:05 PM	Massachusetts		Alfond Arena • Orono, Maine	ESPN+	Östman	L 3–4	5,043	15–15–5 (9–11–4)
Hockey East Tournament
March 8	7:00 PM	Vermont*		Alfond Arena • Orono, Maine	ESPN+	Östman	L 2–4	3,748	15–16–5
*Non-conference game. ^{#}Rankings from USCHO.com Poll. All times are in Eastern Time. Source:

== Scoring statistics ==
Name	Position	Games	Goals	Assists	Points	PIM
Lynden Breen	C	36	21	15	36	22
Ben Poisson	F	36	9	17	26	27
Nolan Renwick	RW	36	9	11	20	16
Donovan Houle-Villeneuve	C	36	9	10	19	16
Jakub Sirota	D	36	6	10	16	39
Didrik Henbrant	C/RW	34	7	8	15	24
Thomas Freel	C	36	2	13	15	27
David Breazeale	D	36	1	12	13	14
Luke Antonacci	D	36	3	9	12	10
Brandon Holt	D	24	4	7	11	2
Grayson Arnott	D	34	2	9	11	25
Michael Mancinelli	C	30	1	10	11	6
Cole Hanson	F	36	6	4	10	22
Félix Trudeau	LW	28	3	5	8	14
Reid Pabich	C	31	2	5	7	4
Killian Kiecker-Olson	C	24	1	4	5	12
Brandon Chabrier	D	28	1	4	5	25
Justin Michaelian	F	20	1	3	4	2
Aiden Carney	F	19	2	1	3	2
Grant Hebert	C	8	1	2	3	0
Samuel Duerr	D	22	0	3	3	8
Dawson Bruneski	D	19	0	2	2	8
Victor Östman	G	33	0	2	2	4
Matthew Fawcett	LW	10	1	0	1	0
Connor Androlewicz	G	3	0	0	0	0
Jacob Mucitelli	G	4	0	0	0	0
Robert Kincaid	D	8	0	0	0	0
Parker Lindauer	F	15	0	0	0	4
Total			92	167	259	333

== Goaltending statistics ==
Name	Games	Minutes	Wins	Losses	Ties	Goals against	Saves	Shut outs	SV %	GAA
Victor Östman	33	1874:39	14	12	4	69	773	5	.918	2.21
Connor Androlewicz	3	134:27	0	1	1	7	45	0	.865	3.12
Jacob Mucitelli	4	161:29	1	3	0	13	61	0	.824	4.83
Empty Net	-	21:25	-	-	-	5	-	-	-	-
Total	36	2192:00	15	16	5	94	879	5	.903	2.57

== Rankings ==
Poll	Week																											
Poll	Pre	1	2	3	4	5	6	7	8	9	10	11	12	13	14	15	16	17	18	19	20	21	22	23	24	25	26	27 (Final)
USCHO.com	NR	-	NR	NR	NR	NR	NR	NR	NR	NR	NR	NR	NR	-	NR	NR	NR	NR	NR	NR	NR	NR	NR	NR	NR	NR	-	NR
USA Today	NR	NR	NR	NR	NR	NR	NR	NR	NR	NR	NR	NR	NR	NR	NR	NR	NR	NR	NR	NR	NR	NR	NR	NR	NR	NR	NR	NR

Note: USCHO did not release a poll in weeks 1, 13, or 26.

== Awards and honors ==
Player	Award	Ref
Victor Östman	Hockey East Second Team	
Lynden Breen	Hockey East Second Team	

== Players drafted into the NHL ==
=== 2023 NHL Entry Draft ===
Round	Pick	Player	NHL team
1	30	Bradly Nadeau ^{†}	Carolina Hurricanes

† incoming freshman
