= 2022–23 UConn Huskies men's ice hockey season =

- Conference: 4th Hockey East
- Home ice: XL Center; Toscano Family Ice Forum

Rankings
- USCHO: NR
- USA Today: NR

Record
- Overall: 20–12–3
- Conference: 13–9–2
- Home: 13–4–2
- Road: 6–6–1
- Neutral: 1–2–0

Coaches and captains
- Head coach: Mike Cavanaugh
- Assistant coaches: Joe Pereira; Tyler Helton; Vince Stalletti; Joe Ferriss; Will Moran
- Captain: Roman Kinal
- Alternate captain(s): Jake Flynn; Hudson Schandor

The 2022–23 UConn Huskies men's ice hockey season was the 63rd season of play for the program, the 25th at the Division I level, and the 9th in Hockey East. The Huskies represented the University of Connecticut and were coached by Mike Cavanaugh, in his 10th season.

== Season ==
After one of the best seasons in the history of the program, Mike Cavanaugh knew he would have a difficult time getting Connecticut to match the same level of success in 2023. With nearly half of the roster changing, UConn would need to replace not only its starting goaltender but three of its top four scorers as well. Logan Terness, who had played in just a single last year, would have to battle with freshman Arsenii Sergeev for the starting job. Both played well enough to make coach Cavanaugh's decision difficult and, in the end, he couldn't choose. The two netminders ended up sharing the goal crease and posted nearly identical numbers for the year.

On offense, several transfers were brought in but the team would see the biggest benefit from the freshman class. While returning All-American Ryan Tverberg led the team in goals, newcomer Matthew Wood was the Huskies' top scorer. The defense was a little more settled with four players returning, but did receive a boon with the addition of Andrew Lucas.

Despite the lack of familiarity between the players, Connecticut got off to the best start in program history, going undefeated through its first 7 games. The goaltending rotation seemed to work perfectly and staked the program to a huge lead in both the rankings and the conference standings. UConn's streak was ended by Boston University in late November but the Huskies then went another 5 games without a loss to raise their record to 9–1–3.

Around mid-November, Connecticut had risen up to #3 in the national rankings and were firing on all cylinders. The team appeared destined to make the first NCAA tournament in program history and were averaging 3.5 goals for per game while allowing slightly more than 2 against. However, after Thanksgiving, the team's fortunes began to change. Heading into the winter break, the team's goal differential reversed and the Huskies backed into their vacation with a 2–4 stretch. Their postseason chances weren't impacted too badly, since all of their opponents in those games were ranked in or just outside the top-20, but the Huskied would have to play better in the second half if they wanted to keep their head above water.

In the meantime, the University had finished building the first on-campus facility for the program and team was able debut their new rink early in January. While they weren't able to provide the home crowd with a win, the match at the Toscano Family Ice Forum was played before a sellout crowd, as were the rest of the home games that year.

Unfortunately, inconsistent play continued to plague the team in the second half of the season. UConn began alternating wins and losses and, though they finished the second half above .500, several factor caused their playoff hopes to diminish. UConn's schedule in the balk half of their season was far less arduous that the first part, playing just 1 game against a ranked opponent. Any losses to unranked teams were harmful to the Huskies' ranking but being swept by New Hampshire, who was in the bottom third nationally, was particularly damaging. Worse, Hockey East as a whole saw its ranking decrease as the season went on. This caused several teams to fall out of contention for the postseason and hurt Connecticut by lowering the quality of their early-season victories.

The end result was that, by the end of the regular season, UConn was outside of the NCAA tournament picture despite being 9 games above .500. While the new wasn't good, Connecticut was close enough to the cutoff line that they could win their way back into contention. The Huskies entered postseason play at #18 in the PairWise rankings. They were within striking distance of the lowest possible at-large position (#15), and could conceivably make the NCAA tournament without winning a Hockey East championship. UConn received a bye into the quarterfinal round which was both a blessing and a curse. Because they didn't play in the opening round, the team wouldn't receive credit for a potential win there, however, they also didn't risk the possibility of losing early. In any event, Connecticut served as host to Massachusetts Lowell in the quarterfinals and found themselves down early. UConn allowed two goals in the first and entered the second trailing by a pair. The team attacked the Lowell cage for the rest of the game, outshooting the River Hawks 28–5 over the final 40 minutes, but they couldn't solve Grigals. It wasn't until the Huskies pulled Sergeev that they were finally able to get on the board. Unfortunately, UConn was unable to get the tying goal in the final 89 seconds and saw their once bright hopes extinguished.

== Departures ==
Player	Position	Nationality	Cause
Carter Berger	Defenseman	Canada	Transferred to Western Michigan
Cassidy Bowes	Forward	Canada	Left program (retired)
Jonny Evans	Forward	Canada	Graduation (signed with South Carolina Stingrays)
Vladislav Firstov	Forward	Russia	Signed professional contract (Minnesota Wild)
Marc Gatcomb	Forward	United States	Graduation (signed with Abbotsford Canucks)
Jarrod Gourley	Defenseman	Canada	Graduation (signed with Adirondack Thunder)
Darion Hanson	Goaltender	United States	Graduation (signed with Reading Royals)
Jáchym Kondelík	Forward	Germany	Graduation (signed with Nashville Predators)
Kevin O'Neil	Forward	United States	Graduation (signed with South Carolina Stingrays)
Gavin Puskar	Forward	United States	Transferred to Brown
Artem Shlaine	Forward	Russia	Transferred to Northern Michigan
Sasha Teleguine	Forward	United States	Returned to juniors (Chilliwack Chiefs)
Carter Turnbull	Forward	Canada	Graduation (signed with South Carolina Stingrays)
Ryan Wheeler	Defenseman	United States	Graduation (signed with Iowa Heartlanders)
John Wojciechowski	Forward	United States	Graduation (retired)

== Recruiting ==
Player	Position	Nationality	Age	Notes
Ty Amonte	Forward	Canada	24	Norwell, MA; graduate transfer from Boston University
Jake Black	Forward	United States	20	Pomfret, CT
Mark D'Agostino	Forward	United States	21	North Branford, CT
Adam Dawe	Forward	Canada	23	Gander, NL; graduate transfer from Maine
Tristan Fraser	Forward	Canada	20	West Vancouver, BC
Tabor Heaslip	Forward	United States	20	Fort Worth, TX
Huston Karpman	Forward	United States	21	Manhattan Beach, CA
Andrew Lucas	Forward/Defenseman	United States	23	Alexandria, VA; transfer from Vermont
Thomas Messineo	Defenseman	United States	20	Westwood, MA
Jack Pascucci	Defenseman	United States	20	North Andover, MA
Justin Pearson	Forward	Canada	24	Nashua, NH; graduate transfer from Yale
Jake Percival	Forward	United States	20	Avon, CT
Samu Salminen	Forward	Finland	19	Helsinki, FIN; selected 68th overall in 2021
Arsenii Sergeev	Goaltender	Russia	19	Yaroslavl, RUS; selected 205th overall in 2021
Ryan Tattle	Forward	Canada	21	Port Moody, BC
Matthew Wood	Forward	Canada	17	Lethbridge, AB

== Roster ==
As of September 12, 2022.

No.	Nat.	Player	Class	Pos	Height	Weight	DoB	Hometown	Previous team	NHL rights
1	(United States)	Ryan Keane	Senior	G	5' 9" (1.75 m)	160 lb (73 kg)	1998-03-15	Lewisville, Texas	Jamestown Rebels (NAHL)	—
2	(United States)	Jack Pascucci	Freshman	D	6' 2" (1.88 m)	195 lb (88 kg)	2002-02-15	North Andover, Massachusetts	Des Moines Buccaneers (USHL)	—
4	(United States)	Roman Kinal (C)	Senior	D	6' 2" (1.88 m)	190 lb (86 kg)	1998-07-20	Waterford, Michigan	Dubuque Fighting Saints (USHL)	—
5	(United States)	Aidan Metcalfe	Sophomore	D	6' 3" (1.91 m)	191 lb (87 kg)	2000-01-24	Palos Verdes, California	Shreveport Mudbugs (NAHL)	—
6	(United States)	Andrew Lucas	Junior	D	5' 11" (1.8 m)	160 lb (73 kg)	1999-02-05	Alexandria, Virginia	Vermont (HEA)	—
7	(United States)	Huston Karpman	Freshman	F	5' 11" (1.8 m)	200 lb (91 kg)	2001-02-07	Manhattan Beach, California	Minot Minotauros (NAHL)	—
9	(Canada)	Ryan Tattle	Freshman	F	5' 10" (1.78 m)	180 lb (82 kg)	2001-09-07	Port Moody, British Columbia	Coquitlam Express (BCHL)	—
10	(Canada)	Tristan Fraser	Freshman	F	6' 0" (1.83 m)	190 lb (86 kg)	2001-11-13	West Vancouver, British Columbia	Nanaimo Clippers (BCHL)	—
11	(United States)	Ty Amonte	Graduate	F	5' 11" (1.8 m)	180 lb (82 kg)	1998-01-11	Humarock, Massachusetts	Boston University (HEA)	—
12	(United States)	Justin Pearson	Graduate	F	6' 2" (1.88 m)	200 lb (91 kg)	1998-05-17	Nashua, New Hampshire	Yale (ECAC)	—
13	(Finland)	Samu Salminen	Freshman	F	6' 3" (1.91 m)	190 lb (86 kg)	2003-04-09	Helsinki, Finland	Jokerit U20 (U20 SM-sarja)	NJD, 68th overall 2021
15	(United States)	Thomas Messineo	Freshman	D	6' 0" (1.83 m)	190 lb (86 kg)	2002-05-02	Westwood, Massachusetts	Chilliwack Chiefs (BCHL)	—
16	(United States)	Jake Flynn (A)	Senior	D	6' 0" (1.83 m)	180 lb (82 kg)	2001-05-26	Bridgewater, Massachusetts	Thayer Academy (USHS–MA)	—
17	(United States)	Jake Percival	Freshman	F	5' 10" (1.78 m)	180 lb (82 kg)	2002-02-11	Avon, Connecticut	Cedar Rapids RoughRiders (USHL)	—
18	(United States)	John Spetz	Junior	D	5' 10" (1.78 m)	195 lb (88 kg)	1999-12-01	Oak Ridge, New Jersey	Chicago Steel (USHL)	—
19	(United States)	Jake Black	Freshman	D	5' 11" (1.8 m)	180 lb (82 kg)	2002-03-05	Pomfret, Connecticut	Johnstown Tomahawks (NAHL)	—
20	(United States)	Chase Bradley	Sophomore	F	5' 11" (1.8 m)	180 lb (82 kg)	2002-01-09	St. Louis, Missouri	Sioux City Musketeers (USHL)	DET, 203rd overall 2020
21	(United States)	Nick Capone	Junior	F	6' 2" (1.88 m)	205 lb (93 kg)	2001-12-17	East Haven, Connecticut	Tri-City Storm (USHL)	TBL, 157th overall 2020
22	(Canada)	Hudson Schandor (A)	Junior	F	5' 8" (1.73 m)	165 lb (75 kg)	2000-09-29	North Vancouver, British Columbia	Surrey Eagles (BCHL)	—
23	(United States)	Tabor Heaslip	Freshman	F	5' 9" (1.75 m)	175 lb (79 kg)	2001-12-17	Frisco, Texas	Sioux City Musketeers (USHL)	—
24	(United States)	Mark D'Agostino	Freshman	F	6' 0" (1.83 m)	180 lb (82 kg)	2001-05-06	North Branford, Connecticut	Powell River Kings (BCHL)	—
27	(Canada)	Harrison Rees	Senior	D	6' 2" (1.88 m)	175 lb (79 kg)	2000-03-19	Mississauga, Ontario	North York Rangers (OJHL)	—
28	(Canada)	Ryan Tverberg	Junior	F	5' 11" (1.8 m)	180 lb (82 kg)	2002-01-30	Richmond Hill, Ontario	Toronto Jr. Canadiens (OJHL)	TOR, 213th overall 2020
29	(United States)	Jake Veilleux	Sophomore	D	6' 0" (1.83 m)	185 lb (84 kg)	2000-01-19	South Windsor, Connecticut	Victoria Grizzlies (BCHL)	—
30	(Russia)	Arsenii Sergeev	Freshman	G	6' 3" (1.91 m)	195 lb (88 kg)	2002-12-16	Yaroslavl, Russia	Tri-City Storm (USHL)	CGY, 205th overall 2021
31	(United States)	Matt Pasquale	Junior	G	6' 2" (1.88 m)	190 lb (86 kg)	2000-10-06	North Reading, Massachusetts	Northeast Generals (NAHL)	—
34	(Canada)	Adam Dawe	Graduate	F	5' 7" (1.7 m)	165 lb (75 kg)	1999-01-18	Gander, Newfoundland and Labrador	Maine (HEA)	—
35	(Canada)	Logan Terness	Sophomore	G	6' 1" (1.85 m)	185 lb (84 kg)	2002-09-18	Burnaby, British Columbia	Trail Smoke Eaters (BCHL)	—
71	(Canada)	Matthew Wood	Freshman	F	6' 3" (1.91 m)	190 lb (86 kg)	2005-02-06	Lethbridge, Alberta	Victoria Grizzlies (BCHL)	—

== Standings ==
2022–23 Hockey East Standings
	Conference record										Overall record					
	GP	W	L	T	OTW	OTL	SW	PTS	GF	GA	GP	W	L	T	GF	GA
#4 Boston University †*	24	18	6	0	2	2	0	54	99	62	40	29	11	0	154	106
#14 Merrimack	24	16	8	0	2	4	0	50	72	52	38	23	14	1	106	89
#16 Northeastern	24	14	7	3	0	2	2	49	78	45	35	17	13	5	107	82
Connecticut	24	13	9	2	4	2	2	41	78	71	35	20	12	3	113	96
Massachusetts Lowell	24	11	10	3	2	2	3	39	56	54	36	18	15	3	89	82
Maine	24	9	11	4	1	1	1	32	62	65	36	15	16	5	92	94
Providence	24	9	9	6	3	0	2	32	64	60	37	16	14	7	103	87
Boston College	24	8	11	5	0	0	1	30	70	73	36	14	16	6	104	104
Massachusetts	24	7	14	3	1	3	2	28	55	80	35	13	17	5	94	103
New Hampshire	24	6	15	3	2	2	2	23	44	76	35	11	20	3	74	105
Vermont	24	5	16	3	2	1	1	18	36	76	36	11	20	5	69	103
Championship: March 18, 2023 † indicates regular season champion * indicates conference tournament champion (Lamoriello Trophy); Rankings: USCHO.com Top 20 Poll

== Schedule and results ==
Date	Time	Opponent^{#}	Rank^{#}	Site	TV	Decision	Result	Attendance	Record
Regular Season
October 1	7:00 PM	at Vermont		Gutterson Fieldhouse • Burlington, Vermont	ESPN+	Terness	W 4–1	3,095	1–0–0 (1–0–0)
October 2	4:00 PM	at Vermont		Gutterson Fieldhouse • Burlington, Vermont	ESPN+	Sergeev	W 3–1	1,918	2–0–0 (2–0–0)
October 7	7:05 PM	Union*	#20	XL Center • Hartford, Connecticut	ESPN+	Terness	W 4–1	2,584	3–0–0
October 8	4:05 PM	Union*	#20	XL Center • Hartford, Connecticut	ESPN+	Sergeev	W 4–3 ^{OT}	2,442	4–0–0
October 14	7:05 PM	#11 Ohio State*	#17	XL Center • Hartford, Connecticut	ESPN+	Terness	T 0–0 ^{OT}	2,850	4–0–1
October 15	4:05 PM	#11 Ohio State*	#17	XL Center • Hartford, Connecticut	ESPN+	Sergeev	W 6–1	2,735	5–0–1
October 21	7:00 PM	at #9 Boston University	#14	Agganis Arena • Boston, Massachusetts	ESPN+	Terness	W 4–3 ^{OT}	2,735	6–0–1 (3–0–0)
October 22	7:00 PM	at #9 Boston University	#14	Agganis Arena • Boston, Massachusetts	ESPN+	Sergeev	L 2–5	4,864	6–1–1 (3–1–0)
October 27	7:05 PM	Boston College	#10	XL Center • Hartford, Connecticut	ESPN+	Terness	W 5–1	3,031	7–1–1 (4–1–0)
November 4	7:05 PM	Maine	#8	XL Center • Hartford, Connecticut	ESPN+	Terness	W 3–2 ^{OT}	3,020	8–1–1 (5–1–0)
November 5	4:05 PM	Maine	#8	XL Center • Hartford, Connecticut	ESPN+	Sergeev	W 3–2	2,993	9–1–1 (6–1–0)
November 11	7:00 PM	at #9 Providence	#7	Schneider Arena • Providence, Rhode Island	ESPN+	Terness	T 1–1 ^{SOW}	3,310	9–1–2 (6–1–1)
November 12	3:05 PM	#9 Providence	#7	XL Center • Hartford, Connecticut	ESPN+	Sergeev	T 6–6 ^{SOW}	-	9–1–3 (6–1–2)
November 18	7:15 PM	at #13 Massachusetts Lowell	#7	Tsongas Center • Lowell, Massachusetts	ESPN+	Terness	L 2–3 ^{OT}	4,806	9–2–3 (6–2–2)
November 19	3:35 PM	#13 Massachusetts Lowell	#7	XL Center • Hartford, Connecticut	ESPN+	Sergeev	W 4–2	3,665	10–2–3 (7–2–2)
November 26	8:00 PM	vs. Cornell*	#6	Madison Square Garden • Manhattan, New York (The Frozen Apple)	ESPN+	Terness	L 0–6	12,247	10–3–3
November 29	7:00 PM	at #12 Merrimack	#8	J. Thom Lawler Rink • North Andover, Massachusetts	ESPN+	Sergeev	W 3–1	2,857	11–3–3 (8–2–2)
December 2	7:05 PM	#12 Merrimack	#8	XL Center • Hartford, Connecticut	ESPN+	Terness	L 3–7	3,846	11–4–3 (8–3–2)
December 11	2:05 PM	#7 Boston University	#8	XL Center • Hartford, Connecticut	ESPN+	Sergeev	L 2–3	4,560	11–5–3 (8–4–2)
December 29	7:00 PM	at Long Island*	#10	Northwell Health Ice Center • East Meadow, New York	ESPN+	Sergeev	W 2–1 ^{OT}	707	12–5–3
December 31	1:05 PM	Long Island*	#10	XL Center • Hartford, Connecticut	ESPN+	Terness	W 5–3	4,647	13–5–3
January 7	2:30 PM	vs. Northeastern	#9	Fenway Park • Boston, Massachusetts (Frozen Fenway)	NESN, ESPN+	Sergeev	L 1–4	-	13–6–3 (8–5–2)
January 14	7:05 PM	Northeastern	#11	Toscano Family Ice Forum • Storrs, Connecticut	ESPN+	Terness	L 3–4	2,691	13–7–3 (8–6–2)
January 20	7:00 PM	at Massachusetts	#13	Mullins Center • Amherst, Massachusetts	NESN+, ESPN+	Sergeev	W 4–3 ^{OT}	3,411	14–7–3 (9–6–2)
January 21	4:35 PM	Massachusetts	#13	Toscano Family Ice Forum • Storrs, Connecticut	ESPN+	Terness	W 3–1	2,691	15–7–3 (10–6–2)
Connecticut Hockey Tournament
January 27	4:00 PM	vs. Yale*	#12	M&T Bank Arena • Hamden, Connecticut (Connecticut Ice Semifinal)		Sergeev	W 6–1	3,625	16–7–3
January 28	7:30 PM	at #3 Quinnipiac*	#12	M&T Bank Arena • Hamden, Connecticut (Connecticut Ice Championship)		Sergeev	L 3–4	-	16–8–3
February 3	7:00 PM	Northeastern	#14	Matthews Arena • Boston, Massachusetts	ESPN+	Terness	W 4–3 ^{OT}	3,021	17–8–3 (11–6–2)
February 10	7:00 PM	at New Hampshire	#13	Whittemore Center • Durham, New Hampshire	ESPN+	Terness	L 1–4	4,528	17–9–3 (11–7–2)
February 11	4:00 PM	at New Hampshire	#13	Whittemore Center • Durham, New Hampshire	NESN, ESPN+	Sergeev	L 2–3 ^{OT}	4,845	17–10–3 (11–8–2)
February 23	7:05 PM	Alaska Anchorage*	#16	Toscano Family Ice Forum • Storrs, Connecticut	ESPN+	Terness	W 4–3 ^{OT}	2,691	18–10–3
February 25	7:05 PM	New Hampshire	#16	Toscano Family Ice Forum • Storrs, Connecticut	ESPN+	Sergeev	W 6–1	2,691	19–10–3 (12–8–2)
March 3	7:00 PM	at Boston College	#17	Conte Forum • Chestnut Hill, Massachusetts	NESN, ESPN+	Terness	L 3–5	4,559	19–11–3 (12–9–2)
March 4	4:05 PM	Boston College	#17	Toscano Family Ice Forum • Storrs, Connecticut	ESPN+	Sergeev	W 6–5	2,691	20–11–3 (13–9–2)
Hockey East Tournament
March 11	4:00 PM	Massachusetts Lowell*	#19	Toscano Family Ice Forum • Storrs, Connecticut (Quarterfinal)	NESN+, ESPN+	Sergeev	L 1–2	2,691	20–12–3
*Non-conference game. ^{#}Rankings from USCHO.com Poll. All times are in Eastern Time. Source:

== Scoring statistics ==
Name	Position	Games	Goals	Assists	Points	PIM
Matthew Wood	C//LW	35	11	23	34	4
Hudson Schandor	C	35	11	21	32	8
Ryan Tverberg	C/RW	35	15	15	30	34
Justin Pearson	F	35	13	14	27	29
Andrew Lucas	D/F	35	2	22	24	6
Chase Bradley	C/LW	35	10	10	20	61
Nick Capone	RW	35	9	9	18	34
Samu Salminen	C/LW	27	9	8	17	14
Jake Flynn	D	35	4	10	14	12
Jake Percival	F	34	6	6	12	9
John Spetz	D	35	2	10	12	12
Ty Amonte	RW	30	6	5	11	10
Tristan Fraser	F	34	4	5	9	16
Harrison Rees	D	35	2	7	9	14
Roman Kinal	D	35	2	5	7	42
Tom Messineo	D	35	0	7	7	6
Tabor Heaslip	F	35	2	4	6	4
Jake Veilleux	D/F	32	3	2	5	2
Jake Black	F	9	1	2	3	0
Adam Dawe	C/RW	16	1	0	1	8
Ryan Tattle	F	13	0	1	1	10
Huston Karpman	F	6	0	0	0	17
Jack Pascucci	D	7	0	0	0	4
Logan Terness	G	18	0	0	0	0
Arsenii Sergeev	G	19	0	0	0	2
Total			113	185	298	358

== Goaltending statistics ==
Name	Games	Minutes	Wins	Losses	Ties	Goals against	Saves	Shut outs	SV %	GAA
Logan Terness	18	1018:45	9	6	1	43	451	1	.913	2.53
Arsenii Sergeev	19	1104:18	11	6	1	48	498	0	.912	2.61
Empty Net	-	14:59	-	-	-	5	-	-	-	-
Total	35	2138:02	20	16	0	96	949	1	.908	2.69

== Rankings ==
Poll	Week																											
Poll	Pre	1	2	3	4	5	6	7	8	9	10	11	12	13	14	15	16	17	18	19	20	21	22	23	24	25	26	27 (Final)
USCHO.com	NR	-	20	17	14	10	8 (1)	7 (2)	7	6	8	8	10	-	9	11	13	12	14	13	14	16	17	19	NR	NR	-	NR
USA Today	NR	NR	NR	17	13	10	8	8	8	6	8	8	10	10	10	11	16	12	14	14	17	17	18	19	NR	NR	NR	NR

Note: USCHO did not release a poll in weeks 1, 13, or 26.

== Awards and honors ==
Player	Award	Ref
Hudson Schandor	Len Ceglarski Award	
Ryan Tverberg	Hockey East First Team	
Matthew Wood	Hockey East Rookie Team	

== Players drafted into the NHL ==
=== 2023 NHL entry draft ===
Round	Pick	Player	NHL team
1	15	Matthew Wood	Nashville Predators

† incoming freshman
