= 2022–23 New Hampshire Wildcats men's ice hockey season =

Ice Hockey competition season

- Conference: 10th Hockey East
- Home ice: Whittemore Center

Rankings
- USCHO: NR
- USA Today: NR

Record
- Overall: 11–21–3
- Conference: 6–13–3
- Home: 6–8–3
- Road: 5–13–0

Coaches and captains
- Head coach: Mike Souza
- Assistant coaches: Glenn Stewart; Jeff Giuliano; Ty Conklin
- Captain: Chase Stevenson
- Alternate captain(s): Harrison Blaisdell; Kalle Eriksson; Alex Gagne

The 2022–23 New Hampshire Wildcats Men's ice hockey season was the 97th season of play for the program and the 39th in the Hockey East conference. The Wildcats represented the University of New Hampshire and were coached by Mike Souza, in his 5th season.

== Season ==
With about half of the roster changing in the offseason, the outlook for New Hampshire was a complete unknown. Gone was the team's starting goaltender, as well as its top three scorers. David Fessenden, who had previously been a starter at Alabama–Huntsville, held the inside track for the job at the start but he ended up sharing the job with Tyler Muszelik for most of the season. The revamped offense seemed capable enough in the first few games, enabling the team to post an early 3–2 record. Unfortunately, after that decent start, the scoring completely dried up. Over a nearly 8-week stretch, New Hampshire went 0–12–1 and scored more two goals on just one occasion. While the defense wasn't particularly strong in that span, the offense squandered the chances they got by averaging slightly more than 1 goal per game. It wasn't until the series with Arizona State in min-December that the team pulled out of its tailspin but they still ended the first half of the season 10 games under .500.

With the Wildcats on pace for one of their worst performances in history, UNH stumbled after their return from the winter break. The team got swept by a down Union squad and then had to run through a gauntlet as 8 of their next 9 games came against ranked opponents. With everything arrayed against them, New Hampshire completely turned its season around. Fessenden played some his best hockey in that 9-game stretch while the offense rediscovered its scoring touch. The Wildcats went 7–2 in those games to pull itself out of the doldrums. While they weren't solely responsible, the wins that UNH posted in that run helped knock Connecticut and Providence out of the NCAA tournament.

While the wins came too late to save New Hampshire's season, they did show what the team was capable of doing. The offense struggled over the final few games and cost the team in their lone playoff game, but the Wildcats had already proven themselves to be 'giant-killers'.

== Departures ==
Player	Position	Nationality	Cause
Joe Cipollone	Forward	United States	Graduation (signed with South Carolina Stingrays)
Filip Engarås	Forward	Sweden	Signed professional contract (Bakersfield Condors)
Eric Esposito	Forward	United States	Graduate transfer to Mercyhurst
Lucas Herrmann	Forward	United States	Left program (retired)
Drew Hickey	Defenseman	United States	Graduation (retired)
Eric MacAdams	Forward	United States	Graduation (signed with Adirondack Thunder)
Will MacKinnon	Defenseman	United States	Graduation (signed with Reading Royals)
Jake Moniz	Goaltender	United States	Left program (retired)
Jackson Pierson	Forward	United States	Graduate transfer to Notre Dame
Carsen Richels	Forward	United States	Transferred to St. Scholastica
Mike Robinson	Goaltender	United States	Graduation (signed with Reading Royals)
Alec Semandel	Defenseman	United States	Graduation (signed with HK 36 Skalica)
Ryan Verrier	Defenseman	United States	Graduation (signed with Worcester Railers)
Tyler Ward	Forward	Canada	Graduation (signed with Maine Mariners)

== Recruiting ==
Player	Position	Nationality	Age	Notes
Jack Babbage	Defenseman	United States	22	Tully, NY; transfer from Quinnipiac
Damien Carfagna	Defenseman	United States	19	Wood-Ridge, NJ
Nico DeVita	Defenseman	United States	21	Bellevue, WA; transfer from Ferris State
Jake Dunlap	Forward	United States	20	Windham, NH
Cy Leclerc	Forward	United States	20	Brentwood, NH
Conor Lovett	Forward	United States	21	Franklin, MA; transfer from Merrimack
Tyler Muszelik	Goaltender	United States	18	Long Valley, NJ; selected 189th overall in 2022
Cade Penney	Defenseman	Canada	21	White Rock, BC
Stiven Sardaryan	Forward	Russia	19	Saint Petersburg, RUS; selected 88th overall in 2021
Kristaps Skrastiņš	Forward	Latvia	20	Grobiņa, LAT
Morgan Winters	Forward	United States	20	Osprey, FL

== Roster ==
As of August 23, 2022.

No.	Nat.	Player	Class	Pos	Height	Weight	DoB	Hometown	Previous team	NHL rights
1	(United States)	Jeremy Forman	Junior	G	5' 10" (1.78 m)	150 lb (68 kg)	1999-09-22	Northbrook, Illinois	Corpus Christi IceRays (NAHL)	—
2	(United States)	Jack Babbage	Sophomore	D	6' 1" (1.85 m)	185 lb (84 kg)	2000-08-30	Tully, New York	Quinnipiac (ECAC)	—
3	(United States)	Conor Lovett	Sophomore	F	5' 11" (1.8 m)	200 lb (91 kg)	2001-04-07	Franklin, Massachusetts	Cedar Rapids RoughRiders (USHL)	—
6	(United States)	Nico DeVita	Sophomore	D	6' 2" (1.88 m)	202 lb (92 kg)	2001-05-24	Bellevue, Washington	Ferris State (CCHA)	—
7	(Russia)	Stiven Sardarian	Freshman	F	6' 1" (1.85 m)	170 lb (77 kg)	2003-02-07	Saint Petersburg, Russia	Youngstown Phantoms (USHL)	BUF, 88th overall 2021
8	(United States)	Nikolai Jenson	Junior	D	5' 11" (1.8 m)	193 lb (88 kg)	2000-07-28	Cold Spring, Minnesota	Youngstown Phantoms (USHL)	—
9	(United States)	Connor Sweeney	Sophomore	F	6' 2" (1.88 m)	200 lb (91 kg)	2000-05-05	North Andover, Massachusetts	Islanders Hockey Club (NCDC)	—
10	(Sweden)	Kalle Eriksson (A)	Senior	D	5' 10" (1.78 m)	178 lb (81 kg)	1999-09-15	Leksand, Sweden	Madison Capitols (USHL)	—
11	(United States)	Jake Dunlap	Freshman	F	5' 9" (1.75 m)	160 lb (73 kg)	2001-12-05	Windham, New Hampshire	Madison Capitols (USHL)	—
12	(United States)	Liam Devlin	Sophomore	F	5' 11" (1.8 m)	192 lb (87 kg)	2001-01-07	Needham, Massachusetts	Omaha Lancers (USHL)	—
13	(United States)	Nick Cafarelli	Junior	F	5' 10" (1.78 m)	182 lb (83 kg)	2001-12-31	Middleton, Massachusetts	Wenatchee Wild (BCHL)	—
15	(Canada)	Chase Stevenson (C)	Senior	F	5' 11" (1.8 m)	180 lb (82 kg)	1999-01-13	West Kelowna, British Columbia	Trail Smoke Eaters (BCHL)	—
16	(Canada)	Luke Reid	Junior	D	6' 0" (1.83 m)	192 lb (87 kg)	2001-09-26	Warman, Saskatchewan	Chicago Steel (USHL)	NSH, 166th overall 2020
17	(Latvia)	Kristaps Skrastiņš	Freshman	F	5' 10" (1.78 m)	180 lb (82 kg)	2001-11-20	Grobiņa, Latvia	Amarillo Wranglers (NAHL)	—
18	(Canada)	Harrison Blaisdell (A)	Senior	F	5' 11" (1.8 m)	190 lb (86 kg)	2001-03-18	Regina, Saskatchewan	North Dakota (NCHC)	WPG, 134th overall 2019
19	(United States)	Damien Carfagna	Freshman	D	5' 11" (1.8 m)	180 lb (82 kg)	2002-12-12	Wood-Ridge, New Jersey	Sioux City (USHL)	—
20	(United States)	Colton Huard	Sophomore	D	6' 3" (1.91 m)	200 lb (91 kg)	2000-11-27	Foothill Ranch, California	Chicago Steel (USHL)	—
21	(United States)	Cam Gendron	Junior	D	6' 3" (1.91 m)	181 lb (82 kg)	1999-02-05	Hampstead, New Hampshire	New Jersey Titans (NAHL)	—
22	(United States)	Joe Hankinson	Senior	F	6' 0" (1.83 m)	194 lb (88 kg)	1999-06-15	Hopkins, Minnesota	Cedar Rapids RoughRiders (USHL)	—
24	(United States)	Robert Cronin	Sophomore	F	5' 10" (1.78 m)	187 lb (85 kg)	2000-08-15	Plymouth, Massachusetts	Dubuque Fighting Saints (USHL)	—
25	(United States)	Will Margel	Sophomore	F	5' 9" (1.75 m)	165 lb (75 kg)	2001-03-16	Potomac, Maryland	Johnstown Tomahawks (NAHL)	—
26	(United States)	Morgan Winters	Freshman	F	5' 11" (1.8 m)	165 lb (75 kg)	2001-12-08	Osprey, Florida	Omaha Lancers (USHL)	—
27	(United States)	Cade Penney	Freshman	D	6' 0" (1.83 m)	165 lb (75 kg)	2001-03-23	West Chester, Pennsylvania	Surrey Eagles (BCHL)	—
28	(United States)	Alex Gagne (A)	Sophomore	D	6' 4" (1.93 m)	207 lb (94 kg)	2002-08-12	Bedford, New Hampshire	Muskegon Lumberjacks (USHL)	TBL, 192nd overall 2021
29	(United States)	Cy LeClerc	Freshman	F	5' 9" (1.75 m)	180 lb (82 kg)	2002-08-17	Brentwood, New Hampshire	Janesville Jets (NAHL)	—
30	(United States)	Tyler Muszelik	Freshman	G	6' 3" (1.91 m)	190 lb (86 kg)	2004-07-01	Long Valley, New Jersey	USNTDP (USHL)	FLA, 189th overall 2022
35	(United States)	Rafe Gaughan	Sophomore	G	6' 1" (1.85 m)	185 lb (84 kg)	2000-02-11	Somersworth, New Hampshire	Northeast Generals (NA3HL)	—
41	(United States)	David Fessenden	Senior	G	6' 6" (1.98 m)	230 lb (104 kg)	1998-04-30	Parker, Colorado	Alabama–Huntsville (WCHA)	—

== Standings ==
2022–23 Hockey East Standings
	Conference record										Overall record					
	GP	W	L	T	OTW	OTL	SW	PTS	GF	GA	GP	W	L	T	GF	GA
#4 Boston University †*	24	18	6	0	2	2	0	54	99	62	40	29	11	0	154	106
#14 Merrimack	24	16	8	0	2	4	0	50	72	52	38	23	14	1	106	89
#16 Northeastern	24	14	7	3	0	2	2	49	78	45	35	17	13	5	107	82
Connecticut	24	13	9	2	4	2	2	41	78	71	35	20	12	3	113	96
Massachusetts Lowell	24	11	10	3	2	2	3	39	56	54	36	18	15	3	89	82
Maine	24	9	11	4	1	1	1	32	62	65	36	15	16	5	92	94
Providence	24	9	9	6	3	0	2	32	64	60	37	16	14	7	103	87
Boston College	24	8	11	5	0	0	1	30	70	73	36	14	16	6	104	104
Massachusetts	24	7	14	3	1	3	2	28	55	80	35	13	17	5	94	103
New Hampshire	24	6	15	3	2	2	2	23	44	76	35	11	20	3	74	105
Vermont	24	5	16	3	2	1	1	18	36	76	36	11	20	5	69	103
Championship: March 18, 2023 † indicates regular season champion * indicates conference tournament champion (Lamoriello Trophy); Rankings: USCHO.com Top 20 Poll

== Schedule and results ==
Date	Time	Opponent^{#}	Rank^{#}	Site	TV	Decision	Result	Attendance	Record
Regular Season
October 7	7:00 PM	at #17 Clarkson*		Cheel Arena • Potsdam, New York	ESPN+	Fessenden	W 4–3 ^{OT}	2,267	1–0–0
October 8	7:00 PM	at St. Lawrence*		Appleton Arena • Canton, New York	ESPN+	Muszelik	W 4–1	2,048	2–0–0
October 15	7:00 PM	Boston College*		Whittemore Center • Durham, New Hampshire	ESPN+	Fessenden	L 2–4	6,179	2–1–0 (0–1–0)
October 18	7:00 PM	at Merrimack		J. Thom Lawler Rink • North Andover, Massachusetts	ESPN+	Muszelik	L 1–6	2,814	2–2–0 (0–2–0)
October 21	7:00 PM	Army*		Whittemore Center • Durham, New Hampshire	ESPN+	Fessenden	W 3–1	5,608	3–2–0
October 23	1:00 PM	at Boston College		Conte Forum • Chestnut Hill, Massachusetts	ESPN+	Fessenden	L 0–5	3,524	3–3–0 (0–3–0)
October 28	7:00 PM	#13 Providence		Whittemore Center • Durham, New Hampshire	ESPN+	Muszelik	T 2–2 ^{SOL}	3,906	3–3–1 (0–3–1)
October 29	7:00 PM	at #13 Providence		Schneider Arena • Providence, Rhode Island	NESN+, ESPN+	Fessenden	L 1–3	2,333	3–4–1 (0–4–1)
November 4	7:00 PM	at #16 Northeastern		Matthews Arena • Boston, Massachusetts	NESN+, ESPN+	Muszelik	L 2–6	2,468	3–5–1 (0–5–1)
November 5	7:00 PM	#16 Northeastern		Whittemore Center • Durham, New Hampshire	ESPN+	Fessenden	L 0–3	4,337	3–6–1 (0–6–1)
November 11	7:00 PM	at Vermont		Gutterson Fieldhouse • Burlington, Vermont	ESPN+	Fessenden	L 1–2 ^{OT}	3,003	3–7–1 (0–7–1)
November 12	7:00 PM	at Vermont		Gutterson Fieldhouse • Burlington, Vermont	ESPN+	Fessenden	L 1–2	2,753	3–8–1 (0–8–1)
November 15	7:00 PM	#10 Harvard*		Whittemore Center • Durham, New Hampshire	ESPN+	Muszelik	L 1–3	2,812	3–9–1
November 18	7:00 PM	#16 Massachusetts		Whittemore Center • Durham, New Hampshire	NESN, ESPN+	Fessenden	L 2–4	4,506	3–10–1 (0–9–1)
November 26	7:00 PM	at Holy Cross*		Hart Center • Worcester, Massachusetts	FloHockey	Muszelik	L 2–3	408	3–11–1
December 2	7:00 PM	#9 Boston University		Whittemore Center • Durham, New Hampshire	NESN+, ESPN+	Muszelik	L 3–6	4,396	3–12–1 (0–10–1)
December 3	6:00 PM	at #9 Boston University		Agganis Arena • Boston, Massachusetts	ESPN+	Fessenden	L 0–3	3,574	3–13–1 (0–11–1)
December 9	7:00 PM	Arizona State*		Whittemore Center • Durham, New Hampshire	ESPN+	Fessenden	L 1–4	3,859	3–14–1
December 10	4:00 PM	Arizona State*		Whittemore Center • Durham, New Hampshire	ESPN+	Muszelik	W 5–4	3,363	4–14–1
December 30	4:00 PM	at Union*		Achilles Rink • Schenectady, New York		Fessenden	L 3–4	1,530	4–15–1
December 31	4:00 PM	at Union*		Achilles Rink • Schenectady, New York		Muszelik	L 2–3	1,352	4–16–1
January 6	7:00 PM	at #11 Providence		Schneider Arena • Providence, Rhode Island	ESPN+	Fessenden	W 2–0	2,842	5–16–1 (1–11–1)
January 8	2:00 PM	Sacred Heart*		Whittemore Center • Durham, New Hampshire	ESPN+	Fessenden	W 4–1	4,205	6–16–1
January 15	3:00 PM	at #19 Massachusetts		Mullins Center • Amherst, Massachusetts	NESN, ESPN+	Fessenden	W 3–1	4,246	7–16–1 (2–11–1)
January 20	7:15 PM	at #19 Massachusetts Lowell		Tsongas Center • Lowell, Massachusetts	ESPN+	Fessenden	L 2–6	6,016	7–17–1 (2–12–1)
January 21	7:00 PM	#19 Massachusetts Lowell		Whittemore Center • Durham, New Hampshire	ESPN+	Fessenden	L 2–3	4,237	7–18–1 (2–13–1)
February 3	7:00 PM	#15 Merrimack		Whittemore Center • Durham, New Hampshire	ESPN+	Fessenden	W 3–2 ^{OT}	3,536	8–18–1 (3–13–1)
February 4	6:00 PM	at #16 Massachusetts Lowell		Tsongas Center • Lowell, Massachusetts	ESPN+	Muszelik	W 5–4	5,252	9–18–1 (4–13–1)
February 10	7:00 PM	#13 Connecticut		Whittemore Center • Durham, New Hampshire	ESPN+	Fessenden	W 4–1	4,528	10–18–1 (5–13–1)
February 11	4:00 PM	#13 Connecticut		Whittemore Center • Durham, New Hampshire	NESN, ESPN+	Muszelik	W 3–2 ^{OT}	4,845	11–18–1 (6–13–1)
February 17	7:00 PM	Maine		Whittemore Center • Durham, New Hampshire (Rivalry)	NESN, ESPN+	Fessenden	T 2–2 ^{SOW}	6,501	11–18–2 (6–13–2)
February 18	7:00 PM	Maine		Whittemore Center • Durham, New Hampshire (Rivalry)	ESPN+	Muszelik	T 0–0 ^{SOW}	6,501	11–18–3 (6–13–3)
February 25	7:00 PM	at #16 Connecticut		Toscano Family Ice Forum • Storrs, Connecticut	ESPN+	Fessenden	L 1–6	2,691	11–19–3 (6–14–3)
March 2	7:00 PM	Vermont		Whittemore Center • Durham, New Hampshire	ESPN+	Muszelik	L 2–3	3,448	11–20–3 (6–15–3)
Hockey East Tournament
March 8	7:00 PM	at Providence*		Schneider Arena • Providence, Rhode Island (First Round)	ESPN+	Fessenden	L 1–2 ^{OT}	1,286	11–21–3
*Non-conference game. ^{#}Rankings from USCHO.com Poll. All times are in Eastern Time. Source:

== Scoring statistics ==
Name	Position	Games	Goals	Assists	Points	PIM
Liam Devlin	F	35	12	12	24	18
Cy LeClerc	F	35	13	7	20	6
Chase Stevenson	F	35	12	8	20	28
Colton Huard	D	35	3	16	19	6
Damien Carfagna	D	35	6	10	16	2
Ryan Black	RW	34	5	8	13	0
Nick Cafarelli	F	23	3	8	11	29
Nikolai Jenson	D	33	1	9	10	33
Alex Gagne	D	35	1	8	9	14
Jake Dunlap	F	28	3	4	7	10
Stiven Sardarian	C/RW	29	2	5	7	8
Kristaps Skrastiņš	C	26	3	3	6	4
Kalle Eriksson	D	33	2	4	6	12
Robert Cronin	F	31	1	4	5	14
Luke Reid	D	35	0	5	5	14
Morgan Winters	F	20	4	0	4	16
Harrison Blaisdell	C	32	1	3	4	10
Connor Sweeney	F	34	0	3	3	6
Cam Gendron	F	23	1	1	2	4
Conor Lovett	F	29	1	1	2	16
Will Margel	C/W	12	0	2	2	0
Joe Hankinson	F	7	0	1	1	2
Jack Babbage	D	14	0	1	1	4
David Fessenden	G	25	0	1	1	15
Jeremy Forman	G	2	0	0	0	0
Nico DeVita	D	7	0	0	0	0
Tyler Muszelik	G	13	0	0	0	0
Total			74	124	198	271

== Goaltending statistics ==
Name	Games	Minutes	Wins	Losses	Ties	Goals against	Saves	Shut outs	SV %	GAA
David Fessenden	25	1427:21	7	14	1	63	647	1	.911	2.65
Tyler Muszelik	14	685:29	4	7	2	37	278	1	.883	3.24
Empty Net	-	21:21	-	-	-	5	-	-	-	-
Total	35	2134:01	11	21	3	105	925	2	.898	2.95

== Rankings ==
Poll	Week																											
Poll	Pre	1	2	3	4	5	6	7	8	9	10	11	12	13	14	15	16	17	18	19	20	21	22	23	24	25	26	27 (Final)
USCHO.com	NR	-	NR	NR	NR	NR	NR	NR	NR	NR	NR	NR	NR	-	NR	NR	NR	NR	NR	NR	NR	NR	NR	NR	NR	NR	-	NR
USA Today	NR	NR	NR	NR	NR	NR	NR	NR	NR	NR	NR	NR	NR	NR	NR	NR	NR	NR	NR	NR	NR	NR	NR	NR	NR	NR	NR	NR

Note: USCHO did not release a poll in weeks 1, 13, or 26.

== Awards and honors ==
Player	Award	Ref
New Hampshire Wildcats	Charlie Holt Team Sportsmanship Award	

== Players drafted into the NHL ==
=== 2023 NHL entry draft ===
Round	Pick	Player	NHL team
6	172	Ryan MacPherson ^{†}	Philadelphia Flyers
6	182	Ryan Conmy ^{†}	Los Angeles Kings
7	221	Sebastian Bradshaw ^{†}	Dallas Stars

† incoming freshman
