= 2022–23 Boston College Eagles men's ice hockey season =

- Conference: Hockey East
- Home ice: Kelley Rink

Rankings
- USCHO.com: NR
- USA Today: NR

Record
- Overall: 14–16–6
- Conference: 8–11–5
- Home: 7–6–2
- Road: 5–9–4
- Neutral: 2–1–0

Coaches and captains
- Head coach: Greg Brown
- Assistant coaches: Mike Ayers; Brendan Buckley; Paul Carey
- Captain: Marshall Warren
- Alternate captain(s): Mitch Andres; Trevor Kuntar

The 2022–23 Boston College Eagles men's ice hockey season was the 101st season of play for the program and the 39th in the Hockey East conference. The Eagles represented Boston College in the 2022–23 NCAA Division I men's ice hockey season, playing their home games at Kelley Rink. They were coached by Greg Brown in his 1st season, after taking over for longtime head coach Jerry York who retired after 50 years behind an NCAA bench, 28 of which were for the Eagles.

== Previous season recap ==
The Eagles entered the 2022–23 season following a lackluster 2021–22 campaign. With a 15–8–5 record, going 9–12–3 in conference play, the Eagles finished eighth in Hockey East and failed to secure a berth to the NCAA tournament. Despite a relatively strong start to the year in which they brought trophies home from both the Ice Breaker tournament and Ledyard Bank Classic, the Eagles suffered a 12-game winless streak to start the 2nd half of the year. During that stretch, they fell in the Beanpot opener to Northeastern and tied with Harvard for 3rd place (the first of its kind in tournament history). The postseason only saw the Eagles advance to the Quarterfinals of the Hockey East tournament; after beating New Hampshire in the Opening Round, Northeastern defeated Boston College to deny them a trip to the semi-finals.

== Departures ==
Player	Position	Nationality	Cause
Casey Carreau	Forward	United States	Graduation (transfer to Niagara)
Eric Dop	Goaltender	United States	Graduation (signed with Tulsa Oilers)
Patrick Giles	Forward	United States	Graduation (signed with Florida Panthers)
Drew Helleson	Defenseman	United States	Signed professional contract (Anaheim Ducks)
Brandon Kruse	Forward	United States	Graduation (signed with Henderson Silver Knights)
Jack McBain	Forward	United States	Graduation (signed with Arizona Coyotes)
Marc McLaughlin	Forward	United States	Graduation (signed with Boston Bruins)
Jack St. Ivany	Defenseman	United States	Graduation (signed with Pittsburgh Penguins)
Sam Sternschein	Forward	United States	Graduation (signed with Jacksonville Icemen)
Justin Wells	Defenseman	United States	Graduation (signed with Iowa Heartlanders)

== Recruiting ==
Player	Position	Nationality	Age	Notes
Mitch Benson	Goaltender	Canada	24	Windsor, ON; graduate transfer from Colgate
Cam Burke	Forward	United States	23	Boxborough, MA; graduate transfer from Notre Dame
Paul Davey	Forward	United States	19	Greenwich, CT
Andre Gasseau	Forward	United States	19	Garden Grove, CA; selected 213th overall by the Boston Bruins in 2021
Cutter Gauthier	Forward	United States	18	Skellefteå, SWE; selected 5th overall by the Philadelphia Flyers in 2022
Lukas Gustafsson	Defenseman	United States	19	Alpharetta, GA
Oskar Jellvik	Forward	Sweden	19	Täby, SWE; selected 149th overall by the Boston Bruins in 2021
Charlie Leddy	Defenseman	United States	18	Fairfield, CT; selected 126th overall by the New Jersey Devils in 2022
Christian O'Neill	Forward	United States	24	Westwood, MA; graduate transfer from Princeton
Seamus Powell	Defenseman	United States	18	Marcellus, NY
Dylan Silverstein	Goaltender	United States	18	Calabasas, CA
Will Traeger	Forward	United States	20	Mendota Heights, MN

== Roster ==
As of September 1, 2022.

No.	Nat.	Player	Class	Pos	Height	Weight	DoB	Hometown	Previous team	NHL rights
1	(Canada)	Mitch Benson	Graduate	G	6' 1" (1.85 m)	190 lb (86 kg)	1997-11-18	Windsor, Ontario	Colgate (ECAC)	—
2	(United States)	Eamon Powell	Junior	D	5' 11" (1.8 m)	173 lb (78 kg)	2002-05-10	Marcellus, New York	USNTDP (USHL)	TBL, 116th overall 2020
3	(United States)	Seamus Powell	Freshman	D	6' 0" (1.83 m)	176 lb (80 kg)	2004-04-26	Marcellus, New York	USNTDP (USHL)	—
4	(United States)	Charlie Leddy	Freshman	D	6' 2" (1.88 m)	185 lb (84 kg)	2004-01-11	Fairfield, Connecticut	USNTDP (USHL)	NJD, 126th overall 2022
5	(United States)	Marshall Warren (C)	Senior	D	5' 11" (1.8 m)	180 lb (82 kg)	2001-04-20	Laurel Hollow, New York	USNTDP (USHL)	MIN, 166th overall 2019
6	(United States)	Cade Alami	Sophomore	D	6' 7" (2.01 m)	204 lb (93 kg)	2001-03-13	Bedford, New York	Jersey Hitmen (NCDC)	—
7	(United States)	Aidan Hreschuk	Sophomore	D	5' 11" (1.8 m)	178 lb (81 kg)	2003-02-19	Long Beach, California	USNTDP (USHL)	CBJ, 94th overall 2021
8	(United States)	Lukas Gustafsson	Freshman	D	5' 10" (1.78 m)	190 lb (86 kg)	2002-12-16	Atlanta, Georgia	Chicago Steel (USHL)	—
9	(United States)	Jack Dempsey	Sophomore	F	6' 4" (1.93 m)	204 lb (93 kg)	2001-05-17	Natick, Massachusetts	Boston Junior Bruins (NCDC)	—
10	(United States)	Mitch Andres (A)	Senior	D	6' 1" (1.85 m)	187 lb (85 kg)	1998-09-02	Brainerd, Minnesota	Chilliwack Chiefs (BCHL)	—
11	(Canada)	Colby Ambrosio	Junior	F	5' 9" (1.75 m)	174 lb (79 kg)	2002-08-07	Welland, Ontario	Tri-City Storm (USHL)	COL, 118th overall 2020
12	(United States)	Mike Posma	Sophomore	F	6' 0" (1.83 m)	183 lb (83 kg)	2001-12-04	Pomona, New York	Omaha (USHL)	—
13	(United States)	Nikita Nesterenko	Junior	F	6' 2" (1.88 m)	182 lb (83 kg)	2001-09-10	Brooklyn, New York	Chilliwack Chiefs (BCHL)	MIN, 172nd overall 2019
14	(United States)	Gentry Shamburger	Junior	F	6' 0" (1.83 m)	196 lb (89 kg)	2000-09-29	Atlanta, Georgia	Avon Old Farms (USHS–CT)	—
15	(United States)	Trevor Kuntar (A)	Junior	F	6' 0" (1.83 m)	196 lb (89 kg)	2001-06-20	Buffalo, New York	Youngstown Phantoms (USHL)	BOS, 89th overall 2020
17	(United States)	Cam Burke	Graduate	F	5' 9" (1.75 m)	170 lb (77 kg)	1999-01-08	Boxborough, Massachusetts	Notre Dame (Big Ten)	—
18	(United States)	Paul Davey	Freshman	F	6' 2" (1.88 m)	195 lb (88 kg)	2003-01-11	Greenwich, Connecticut	Des Moines Buccaneers (USHL)	—
19	(United States)	Cutter Gauthier	Freshman	F	6' 2" (1.88 m)	201 lb (91 kg)	2004-01-19	Scottsdale, Arizona	USNTDP (USHL)	PHI, 5th overall 2022
21	(Sweden)	Oskar Jellvik	Freshman	F	5' 11" (1.8 m)	180 lb (82 kg)	2003-02-08	Täby, Sweden	Djurgårdens J20 (J20 Nationell)	BOS, 149th overall 2021
22	(United States)	Christian O'Neill	Graduate	F	5' 11" (1.8 m)	180 lb (82 kg)	1998-06-17	Westwood, Massachusetts	Princeton (ECAC)	—
23	(United States)	Will Traeger	Freshman	F	5' 8" (1.73 m)	172 lb (78 kg)	2002-04-10	Mendota Heights, Minnesota	Jersey Hitmen (NCDC)	—
24	(United States)	Andre Gasseau	Freshman	F	6' 4" (1.93 m)	215 lb (98 kg)	2003-07-03	Garden Grove, California	Fargo Force (USHL)	BOS, 213th overall 2021
26	(Canada)	Liam Izyk	Senior	F	6' 1" (1.85 m)	187 lb (85 kg)	1998-12-27	Blackie, Alberta	Alabama Huntsville (WCHA)	—
27	(United States)	Connor Joyce	Sophomore	F	6' 0" (1.83 m)	168 lb (76 kg)	2001-07-06	Dedham, Massachusetts	Connecticut Jr. Rangers (NCDC)	—
28	(United States)	Matt Argentina	Sophomore	F	5' 10" (1.78 m)	184 lb (83 kg)	2003-01-16	Philadelphia, Pennsylvania	Waterloo Black Hawks (USHL)	—
31	(United States)	Henry Wilder	Junior	G	6' 0" (1.83 m)	185 lb (84 kg)	2001-03-19	Needham, Massachusetts	Hotchkiss School (USHS–CT)	—
32	(United States)	Jack Moffatt	Senior	G	6' 3" (1.91 m)	197 lb (89 kg)	2001-01-08	Wellesley, Massachusetts	Saint Sebastian's School (USHS–MA)	—

== Standings ==
2022–23 Hockey East Standings
	Conference record										Overall record					
	GP	W	L	T	OTW	OTL	SW	PTS	GF	GA	GP	W	L	T	GF	GA
#4 Boston University †*	24	18	6	0	2	2	0	54	99	62	40	29	11	0	154	106
#14 Merrimack	24	16	8	0	2	4	0	50	72	52	38	23	14	1	106	89
#16 Northeastern	24	14	7	3	0	2	2	49	78	45	35	17	13	5	107	82
Connecticut	24	13	9	2	4	2	2	41	78	71	35	20	12	3	113	96
Massachusetts Lowell	24	11	10	3	2	2	3	39	56	54	36	18	15	3	89	82
Maine	24	9	11	4	1	1	1	32	62	65	36	15	16	5	92	94
Providence	24	9	9	6	3	0	2	32	64	60	37	16	14	7	103	87
Boston College	24	8	11	5	0	0	1	30	70	73	36	14	16	6	104	104
Massachusetts	24	7	14	3	1	3	2	28	55	80	35	13	17	5	94	103
New Hampshire	24	6	15	3	2	2	2	23	44	76	35	11	20	3	74	105
Vermont	24	5	16	3	2	1	1	18	36	76	36	11	20	5	69	103
Championship: March 18, 2023 † indicates regular season champion * indicates conference tournament champion (Lamoriello Trophy); Rankings: USCHO.com Top 20 Poll

== Schedule ==
Date	Time	Opponent^{#}	Rank^{#}	Site	TV	Decision	Result	Attendance	Record
Exhibition
October 1	7:30 PM	at Holy Cross*		Hart Center • Worcester, Massachusetts (Exhibition)			L 2–3	N/A	0–0–0 (0–0–0)
Regular Season
October 7	7:00 PM	#6 Quinnipiac*		Conte Forum • Chestnut Hill, Massachusetts	ESPN+	Benson	L 0–4	5,608	0–1–0 (0–0–0)
October 15	7:00 PM	at New Hampshire		Whittemore Center • Durham, New Hampshire	ESPN+	Benson	W 4–2	6,179	1–1–0 (1–0–0)
October 18	7:00 PM	at #12 Northeastern*		Matthews Arena • Boston, Massachusetts	ESPN+	Benson	T 3–3 ^{OT}	2,198	1–1–1 (1–0–0)
October 23	1:00 PM	New Hampshire		Conte Forum • Chestnut Hill, Massachusetts	ESPN+	Benson	W 5–0	3,524	2–1–1 (2–0–0)
October 27	7:00 PM	at #10 Connecticut		XL Center • Hartford, Connecticut	ESPN+	Benson	L 1–5	3,031	2–2–1 (2–1–0)
November 3	7:00 PM	at Merrimack		J. Thom Lawler Rink • North Andover, Massachusetts	ESPN+	Benson	L 1–3	2,612	2–3–1 (2–2–0)
November 5	1:00 PM	Merrimack		Conte Forum • Chestnut Hill, Massachusetts	ESPN+	Benson	L 2–5	4,101	2–4–1 (2–3–0)
November 11	7:00 PM	at #15 Northeastern		Matthews Arena • Boston, Massachusetts	ESPN+	Benson	T 4–4 ^{SOL}	4,724	2–4–2 (2–3–1)
November 12	7:00 PM	#15 Northeastern		Conte Forum • Chestnut Hill, Massachusetts	ESPN+	Benson	W 3–2	5,724	3–4–2 (3–3–1)
November 15	7:00 PM	#13 Massachusetts Lowell		Conte Forum • Chestnut Hill, Massachusetts	NESN, ESPN+	Benson	W 3–2	3,002	4–4–2 (4–3–1)
November 25	4:00 PM	#19 Notre Dame*		Conte Forum • Chestnut Hill, Massachusetts (Rivalry)	ESPN+	Benson	L 2–5	6,234	4–5–2 (4–3–1)
November 29	7:00 PM	at Brown*		Meehan Auditorium • Providence, Rhode Island	ESPN+	Benson	W 4–2	786	5–5–2 (4–3–1)
December 2	7:00 PM	#10 Providence		Conte Forum • Chestnut Hill, Massachusetts	ESPN+	Benson	T 1–1 ^{SOL}	5,119	5–5–3 (4–3–2)
December 3	7:00 PM	at #10 Providence		Schneider Arena • Providence, Rhode Island	ESPN+	Benson	T 2–2 ^{SOW}	3,042	5–5–4 (4–3–3)
December 9	7:00 PM	#7 Boston University		Conte Forum • Chestnut Hill, Massachusetts (Rivalry)	ESPNews	Benson	W 9–6	7,884	6–5–4 (5–3–3)
December 30	9:00 PM	at Arizona State*		Mullett Arena • Tempe, Arizona		Benson	W 5–2	5,000	7–5–4 (5–3–3)
December 31	9:00 PM	at Arizona State*		Mullett Arena • Tempe, Arizona		Benson	L 1–2	4,820	7–6–4 (5–3–3)
January 7	6:00 PM	vs. #15 Massachusetts*		Fenway Park • Boston, Massachusetts (Frozen Fenway)	NESN	Benson	W 4–2	22,500	8–6–4 (5–3–3)
January 14	7:00 PM	at Sacred Heart*	#20	Martire Family Arena • Fairfield, Connecticut	FloHockey, SNY	Benson	W 3–2 ^{OT}	4,103	9–6–4 (5–3–3)
January 20	7:00 PM	Vermont	#18	Conte Forum • Chestnut Hill, Massachusetts	ESPN+	Benson	T 1–1 ^{SOL}	5,763	9–6–5 (5–3–4)
January 21	5:00 PM	Vermont	#18	Conte Forum • Chestnut Hill, Massachusetts	NESN+, ESPN+	Benson	L 2–3	6,226	9–7–5 (5–4–4)
January 27	7:00 PM	at #4 Boston University		Agganis Arena • Boston, Massachusetts (Rivalry)	NESN, ESPN+	Benson	L 3–6	6,150	9–8–5 (5–5–4)
January 28	7:00 PM	#4 Boston University		Conte Forum • Chestnut Hill, Massachusetts (Rivalry)	NESN+, ESPN+	Benson	L 1–3	7,000	9–9–5 (5–6–4)
January 31	7:00 PM	at Northeastern		Matthews Arena • Boston, Massachusetts	NESN, ESPN+	Benson	L 1–2	2,621	9–10–5 (5–7–4)
February 3	7:15 PM	at #16 Massachusetts Lowell		Tsongas Center • Lowell, Massachusetts	NESN, ESPN+	Benson	T 2–2 ^{SOL}	6,000	9–10–6 (5–7–5)
Beanpot
February 6	5:00 PM	vs. #10 Harvard*		TD Garden • Boston, Massachusetts (Beanpot Semifinal)	NESN	Benson	L 3–4 ^{OT}	18,258	9–11–6 (5–7–5)
February 10	7:00 PM	Maine		Conte Forum • Chestnut Hill, Massachusetts	NESN, ESPN+	Benson	L 1–3	4,175	9–12–6 (5–8–5)
February 13	4:30 PM	vs. #5 Boston University*		TD Garden • Boston, Massachusetts (Beanpot Consolation, Rivalry)		Benson	W 4–2	18,258	10–12–6 (5–8–5)
February 17	7:00 PM	Massachusetts		Conte Forum • Chestnut Hill, Massachusetts	ESPN+	Benson	W 7–3	5,328	11–12–6 (6–8–5)
February 18	7:00 PM	at Massachusetts		Mullins Center • Amherst, Massachusetts	ESPN+	Benson	W 3–1	5,278	12–12–6 (7–8–5)
February 24	7:00 PM	at Maine		Alfond Arena • Orono, Maine	ESPN+	Benson	L 3–6	4,870	12–13–6 (7–9–5)
February 25	7:00 PM	at Maine		Alfond Arena • Orono, Maine	ESPN+	Benson	L 1–2	5,045	12–14–6 (7–10–5)
March 3	7:00 PM	#17 Connecticut		Conte Forum • Chestnut Hill, Massachusetts	NESN, ESPN+	Benson	W 5–3	4,559	13–14–6 (8–10–5)
March 4	4:00 PM	at #17 Connecticut		Toscano Family Ice Forum • Storrs, Connecticut	ESPN+	Wilder	L 5–6	2,691	13–15–6 (8–11–5)
Hockey East Tournament
March 8	7:00 PM	Massachusetts*		Conte Forum • Chestnut Hill, Massachusetts (Opening Round)	NESN+	Benson	W 5–2	1,376	14–15–6 (8–11–5)
March 11	7:30 PM	at #14 Merrimack*		J. Thom Lawler Rink • North Andover, Massachusetts (Quarterfinals)	NESN	Benson	L 0–1 ^{2OT}	2,747	14–16–6 (8–11–5)
*Non-conference game. ^{#}Rankings from USCHO.com Poll. All times are in Eastern Time. Source:

== Statistics ==
As of March 14, 2023

=== Skaters ===
No.	Player	POS	YR	GP	G	A	Pts	PIM	PP	SHG	GWG	+/-	SOG
1	Mitch Benson	G	GR	35	0	1	1	0	0	0	0	E	0
2	Eamon Powell	D	JR	36	5	17	22	16	3	0	0	+7	58
3	Seamus Powell	D	FR	21	1	0	1	15	0	0	0	–3	11
4	Charlie Leddy	D	FR	35	2	5	7	47	0	0	1	E	29
5	Marshall Warren	D	SR	36	5	9	14	12	1	0	2	E	80
6	Cade Alami	D	SO	27	0	3	3	21	0	0	0	–4	20
7	Aidan Hreschuk	D	SO	35	1	5	6	20	0	0	0	–5	37
8	Lukas Gustafsson	D	FR	35	3	16	19	19	2	0	1	+4	81
9	Jack Dempsey	F	SO	0	0	0	0	0	0	0	0	E	0
10	Mitch Andres	D	SR	19	1	2	3	0	0	0	0	+1	10
11	Colby Ambrosio	F	JR	36	10	11	21	16	1	0	0	–2	83
12	Mike Posma	F	SO	36	6	4	10	23	2	0	0	+2	42
13	Nikita Nesterenko	F	JR	36	13	21	34	18	4	0	1	+6	110
14	Gentry Shamburger	F	JR	8	0	0	0	2	0	0	0	–1	4
15	Trevor Kuntar	F	JR	34	13	16	29	36	6	0	2	+5	137
17	Cam Burke	F	GR	36	2	8	10	6	1	0	1	–9	62
18	Paul Davey	F	FR	8	0	0	0	0	0	0	0	–1	4
19	Cutter Gauthier	F	FR	32	16	21	37	37	7	0	0	+2	130
21	Oskar Jellvik	F	FR	34	4	13	17	6	1	0	2	–6	65
22	Christian O'Neill	D	GR	36	3	3	6	32	0	0	0	–9	47
23	Will Treager	D	FR	5	0	1	1	0	0	0	0	E	2
24	Andre Gasseau	F	FR	36	10	19	29	14	4	2	2	+6	65
26	Liam Izyk	F	SR	35	3	2	5	24	0	0	1	–7	31
27	Connor Joyce	F	SO	36	4	6	10	4	0	0	0	–2	33
28	Matt Argentina	F	SO	24	2	3	5	4	0	0	1	–1	21
31	Henry Wilder	G	JR	3	0	0	0	0	0	0	0	E	0
32	Jack Moffatt	G	SR	0	0	0	0	0	0	0	0	E	0
	Bench							2					
	Team			36	104	186	290	372	32	2	14	–3	1162

=== Goaltenders ===
No.	Player	YR	GS	GP	MIN	W	L	T	GA	GAA	SA	SV	SV%	SO
1	Mitch Benson	GR	35	35	2132	14	15	6	93	2.62	967	874	0.904	1
31	Henry Wilder	JR	1	3	77	0	1	0	7	5.48	49	42	0.857	0
32	Jack Moffatt	SR	0	0	0	0	0	0	0	0.00	0	0	1.00	0
	Empty Net								4		4			
	Team		36	36	2209	14	16	6	104	2.82	1020	916	0.898	1

== Rankings ==
Poll	Week																											
Poll	Pre	1	2	3	4	5	6	7	8	9	10	11	12	13	14	15	16	17	18	19	20	21	22	23	24	25	26	27 (Final)
USCHO.com	RV	—	RV	RV	RV	RV	RV	NR	RV	RV	RV	RV	RV	—	RV	20	18	RV	RV	RV	RV	RV	NR	RV	RV	RV	—	NR
USA Today	RV	RV	RV	RV	NR	RV	RV	NR	RV	RV	NR	RV	RV	RV	RV	19	18	RV	RV	RV	NR	RV	RV	NR	NR	NR	NR	NR

== Awards and honors ==
Hockey East All-Stars

- Cutter Gauthier, F – Third Team, All-Rookie Team

Hockey East Rookie of the Month

- Cutter Gauthier, F – Month of November, Month of February

Hockey East Player of the Week

- Cutter Gauthier, F – Week of December 13, 2022
- Cam Burke, F – Week of January 10, 2023
- Nikita Nesterenko, F – Week of February 20, 2023

Hockey East Rookie of the Week

- Cutter Gauthier, F – Week of December 6, 2022, Week of January 10, 2023 (Shared with Jack Williams, Northeastern)
- Andre Gasseau, F – Week of January 17, 2023 (Shared with Kristaps Skrastins, New Hampshire)

Hockey East Goalie of the Week

- Mitch Benson – Week of December 6, 2022

Hockey East Defender of the Week

- Lukas Gustafsson, D – Week of October 25, 2022

== Players drafted into the NHL ==
=== 2023 NHL entry draft ===
Round	Pick	Player	NHL team
1	4	William Smith ^{†}	San Jose Sharks
1	8	Ryan Leonard ^{†}	Washington Capitals
1	23	Gabe Perreault ^{†}	New York Rangers
3	69	Jacob Fowler ^{†}	Montreal Canadiens
3	90	Drew Fortescue ^{†}	New York Rangers
4	125	Aram Minnetian ^{†}	Dallas Stars

† incoming freshman
