= Jay O'Brien (ice hockey) =

American ice hockey player (born 1999)

- Born: November 4, 1999 (age 26) Hingham, Massachusetts, U.S.
- Height: 5 ft 11 in (180 cm)
- Weight: 185 lb (84 kg; 13 st 3 lb)
- Position: Center
- Shoots: Right
- team: Free agent
- NHL draft: 19th overall, 2018; Philadelphia Flyers
- Playing career: 2024–present

Jay O'Brien (born November 4, 1999) is an American professional ice hockey center who is currently an unrestricted free agent. He was most recently under contract with the Charlotte Checkers of the American Hockey League (AHL). He was drafted in the first round, 19th overall, by the Philadelphia Flyers in the 2018 NHL entry draft.

== Early life ==
O'Brien was born in Hingham, Massachusetts. Before his senior year of high school, O'Brien was given the option to leave Thayer Academy early and join the Youngstown Phantoms in the United States Hockey League. O'Brien chose to stay at Thayer Academy and put up 80 points in 30 games, a new career high, during the 2017–18 season. Following the 2017–18 season, O'Brien was awarded United States High School All-USA Hockey Player of the Year and was named to the USHS All-USA Hockey First Team. Although O'Brien spent the majority of the season playing high school league hockey, he did play one game for the Phantoms and joined the United States under-18 team for seven exhibition games.

== Playing career ==
Following graduation from Thayer Academy, O'Brien joined the Providence College Friars in the Hockey East of the National Collegiate Athletic Association (NCAA). As a freshman with the Friars in the 2018–19 season, O'Brien struggled to define a role for himself, struggling through injury he was limited to 25 games, totalling just two goals and five points.

Opting to enter the NCAA transfer system and end his tenure with Providence, O'Brien agreed to join Canadian junior team, the Penticton Vees of the British Columbia Hockey League (BCHL), for the 2019–20 season. He later agreed to join fellow Hockey East competitor in Boston University for the 2020–21 season prior to his tenure in the BCHL.

On August 15, 2023, O'Brien became a free agent when the Flyers opted not to sign him. He was later signed to a one-year AHL contract with the Toronto Marlies, the primary affiliate to the Toronto Maple Leafs, on August 25, 2023. However, O'Brien was unable to make his professional debut with the Marlies, missing the entirety of the 2023–24 season through injury.

As a free agent from the Marlies, O'Brien was signed to a one-year AHL contract with the Charlotte Checkers on July 2, 2024. One day before the regular season was set to begin, the Checkers sent O'Brien down to their ECHL affiliate the Savannah Ghost Pirates on October 10, 2024. He would ultimately not play for either team throughout the year.

== International play ==
Medal record

Representing United States

Ice hockey

World Junior Championships
Silver medal – second place	2019 Canada	

After playing 10 games for the Friars, O'Brien was loaned to the United States national junior team to compete at the 2019 World Junior Ice Hockey Championships.

== Career statistics ==
=== Regular season and playoffs ===
			Regular season					Playoffs
Season	Team	League	GP	G	A	Pts	PIM	GP	G	A	Pts	PIM
2014–15	Dexter School	USHS	31	5	4	9	2	—	—	—	—	—
2015–16	Dexter School	USHS	29	14	20	34	6	—	—	—	—	—
2016–17	Thayer Academy	USHS	30	24	41	65	12	—	—	—	—	—
2016–17	Youngstown Phantoms	USHL	4	0	1	1	4	—	—	—	—	—
2017–18	Thayer Academy	USHS	30	43	37	80	12	—	—	—	—	—
2017–18	Youngstown Phantoms	USHL	1	0	0	0	0	—	—	—	—	—
2018–19	Providence College	HE	25	2	3	5	10	—	—	—	—	—
2019–20	Penticton Vees	BCHL	46	25	41	66	51	5	5	5	10	2
2020–21	Boston University	HE	16	8	8	16	10	—	—	—	—	—
2021–22	Boston University	HE	24	10	12	22	38	—	—	—	—	—
2022–23	Boston University	HE	39	8	24	32	42	—	—	—	—	—
NCAA totals			104	28	47	75	98	—	—	—	—	—

=== International ===
Year	Team	Event	Result	GP	G	A	Pts	PIM
2019	United States	WJC	2nd place, silver medalist(s)	7	0	0	0	0
Junior totals				7	0	0	0	0

Awards and achievements
Preceded by Joel Farabee	Philadelphia Flyers' first-round draft pick 2018	Succeeded by Cam York
