= Cameron Lund =

American ice hockey player (born 2004)

- Born: June 7, 2004 (age 22) Bridgewater, Massachusetts, U.S.
- Height: 6 ft 2 in (188 cm)
- Weight: 195 lb (88 kg; 13 st 13 lb)
- Position: Forward
- Shoots: Right
- NHL team (P) Cur. team: San Jose Sharks; San Jose Barracuda (AHL)
- NHL draft: 34th overall, 2022; San Jose Sharks
- Playing career: 2025–present

Cameron Lund (born June 7, 2004) is an American professional ice hockey player for the San Jose Barracuda in the American Hockey League (AHL) as a prospect under contract with the San Jose Sharks of the National Hockey League (NHL). He played college ice hockey at Northeastern.

== Early life ==
Lund was born on June 7, 2004, in Bridgewater, Massachusetts. Lund went to high school at Cushing Academy where he played for one season. While there, he played on a line with Collin Graf, who would go on to play for the San Jose Sharks.

== Playing career ==
=== Junior ===
During the 2021–22 season, Lund recorded 25 goals and 25 assists in 62 games for the Green Bay Gamblers in the United States Hockey League (USHL).

For the 2022–23 season, Lund enrolled at Northeastern University where he played for three seasons. In his junior year at Northeastern, he received Hockey East Third All-Star Team honors.

=== Professional ===
Lund was drafted 34th overall, by the San Jose Sharks, in the 2022 NHL entry draft. Lund signed a three-year, entry-level contract with the Sharks on March 21, 2025. Lund played his first NHL game less than one week later, on March 27, in a 6–5 victory against the Toronto Maple Leafs. He scored his first NHL goal in just his second NHL game, on March 29, against the New York Rangers.

== Career statistics ==
=== Regular season and playoffs ===
			Regular season					Playoffs
Season	Team	League	GP	G	A	Pts	PIM	GP	G	A	Pts	PIM
2020–21	Green Bay Gamblers	USHL	2	1	0	1	2	—	—	—	—	—
2020–21	Boston Junior Bruins	NCDC	40	17	17	34	30	6	3	1	4	0
2021–22	Green Bay Gamblers	USHL	62	25	25	50	49	—	—	—	—	—
2022–23	Northeastern University	HE	35	7	16	23	16	—	—	—	—	—
2023–24	Northeastern University	HE	35	11	19	30	22	—	—	—	—	—
2024–25	Northeastern University	HE	37	18	22	40	14	—	—	—	—	—
2024–25	San Jose Sharks	NHL	11	2	1	3	4	—	—	—	—	—
2025–26	San Jose Barracuda	AHL	37	9	16	25	12	—	—	—	—	—
NHL totals			11	2	1	3	4	—	—	—	—	—

=== International ===
Year	Team	Event	Result	GP	G	A	Pts	PIM
2021	United States	HG18	5th	4	4	1	5	2
Junior totals				4	4	1	5	2

== Awards and honors ==
Award	Year
College
All-Hockey East Third Team	2025
