= Sturefors =

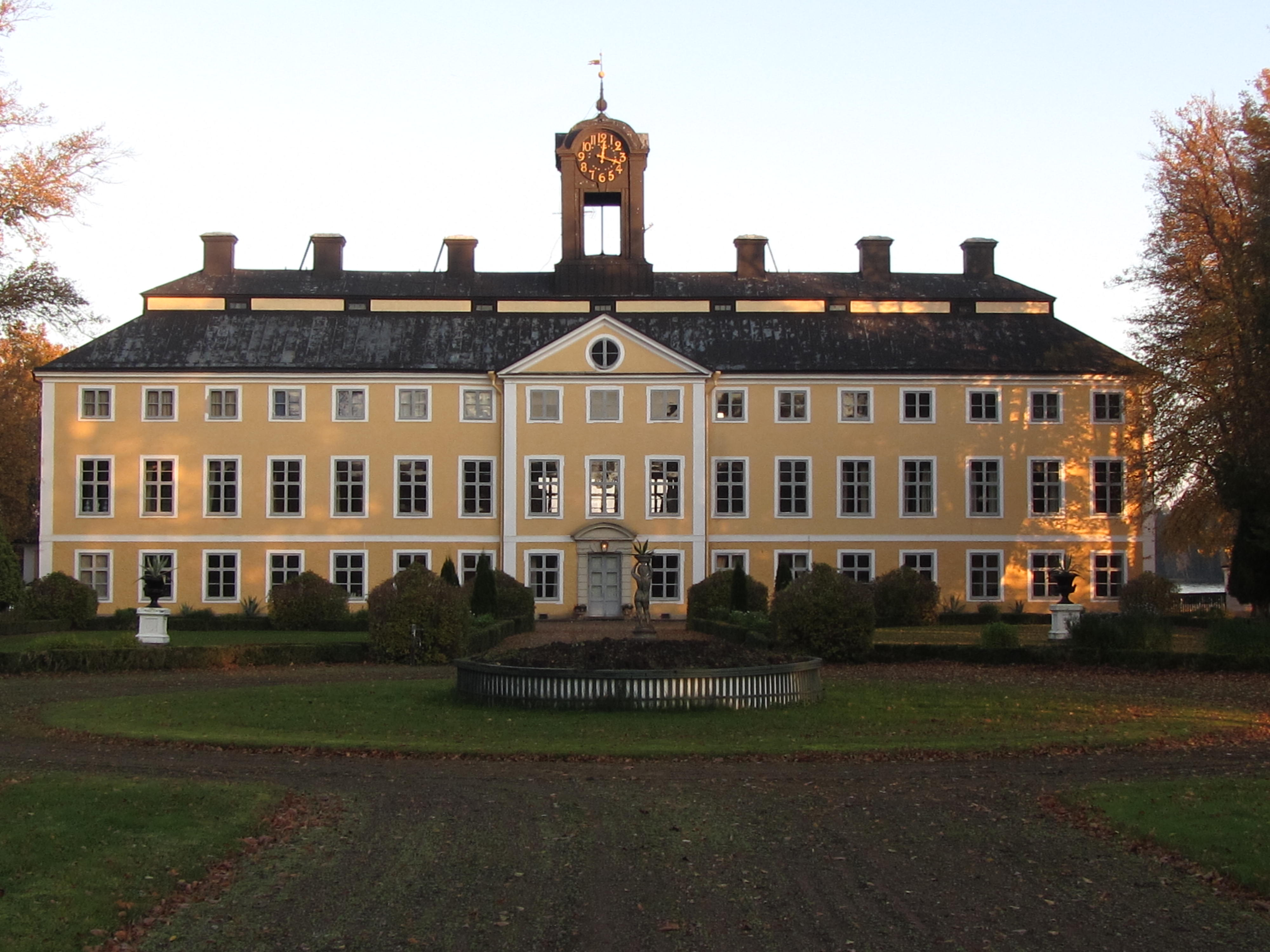

- Location within Östergötland Location within Sweden
- Coordinates: 58°20′N 15°44′E
- Country: Sweden
- Province: Östergötland
- County: Östergötland County
- Municipality: Linköping Municipality

Area
  - Total: 1.05 km^{2} (0.41 sq mi)

Population (31 December 2010)
  - Total: 2,229
  - Density: 2,123/km^{2} (5,500/sq mi)
- Time zone: UTC+1 (CET)
  - Summer (DST): UTC+2 (CEST)

Sturefors is a locality situated in Linköping Municipality, Östergötland County, Sweden with 2,229 inhabitants in 2010.

== History ==
Sturefors was called Husby till 1940. Husby was named Sturefors after Sturefors station and railway station. Sturefors, located in the valley of Stångån between Linköping-Åtvidaberg-Västervik and Linköping-Kisa-Vimmerby-Kalmar railway lines.
