= 2022–23 Merrimack Warriors men's ice hockey season =

NCAA Tournament, Regional Semifinal
- Conference: 2nd Hockey East
- Home ice: J. Thom Lawler Rink

Rankings
- USCHO: #14
- USA Today: #14

Record
- Overall: 23–13–1
- Conference: 16–8–0
- Home: 11–5–1
- Road: 11–6–0
- Neutral: 1–2–0

Coaches and captains
- Head coach: Scott Borek
- Assistant coaches: Josh Ciocco; Dan Jewell; Chris Ross
- Captain: Ben Brar
- Alternate captain(s): Tristan Crozier; Jordan Seyfert

The 2022–23 Merrimack Warriors Men's ice hockey season was the 67th season of play for the program, the 34th at the Division I level, and the 34th in the Hockey East conference. The Warriors represented Merrimack College and were coached by Scott Borek, in his 5th season.

== Season ==
=== Josh Ciocco ===
On October 4, just before the first game of the season, Merrimack announced the death of assistant coach Josh Ciocco. Ciocco was one of the first players head coach Scott Borek had recruited as an assistant at New Hampshire in 2002 and the two had been close ever since.

=== Early Season Success ===
In spite of the grave news, Merrimack opened its season on October 7 and, unsurprisingly, the team had a flat performance. However, the following night, the Warriors fought back after getting down in the second with a tremendous final period to earn their first win of the season. A pair of splits at the end of October weren't bad results as one came against #5 Massachusetts, but the team was still sitting near .500 at the beginning of November. In the second month of the campaign, however, Merrimack would do Ciocco proud and make a change towards the top of the national rankings.

While the team briefly experimented with having Hugo Ollas as the primary starter, they soon reverted back to the goaltender rotation they had used in '22. Ollas was still performing well but Zachary Borgiel, who had been the starter during the difficult COVID season, saw a vast improvement in his play and cut nearly a full goal from his GAA. With both goaltenders playing stellar hockey, Merrimack won their first 6 games in November to charge to the top of the Hockey East standings. The offense, led by Alex Jefferies, was a bit hit or miss but they were able to score enough to give the Warriors the victory on most nights.

A split with Connecticut ended the winning streak but Merrimack kept their foot on the gas and finished out the first half of their season with three consecutive wins over ranked teams. As they headed into the winter break, the Warriors were well inside the top 10 for both polls but, more importantly, they were #3 in the PairWise and only a catastrophe would keep them out of the NCAA tournament.

=== Second half slump ===
Merrimack kicked off the second half of its season with an appearance in the Ledyard Bank Classic. After finishing as the tournament runners-up, The Warriors returned home and promptly lost their place in the polls. A 5-game homestand at the beginning of January turned into a complete debacle and the team won just once as the offense flagged. Worse, they managed to lose to Brown and could only earn a tie against Yale, two of the worst teams in college hockey. Things got even worse when they went on a 5-game road trip and again could only earn a single victory. 2 wins in 10 games sent the team plummeting to the bottom of the polls and pushed them below the cut line for an at-large bid.

With their season swiftly spiraling out of control, the Warriors had to run the table in their final 5 games if they wanted to have any chance at making the NCAA tournament without a conference championship. It was the perfect time for Merrimack to run into league-leading Boston University as the offense suddenly was able to score once more. The Warriors swept the home-and-home series against the Terriers and then repeated the feat a week later against #19 Massachusetts Lowell. The wins pushed Merrimack up to 14 in the rankings, inside the tournament but only just.

=== Hockey East Tournament ===
Merrimack finished the season 2nd in Hockey East, the best finish since joining the conference in 1989, but still had to fight to make the tournament. because several other teams were also jockeying for an at-large bid, a loss in the postseason could easily knock the Warriors out. After receiving a bye into the quarterfinals, Merrimack opened their playoffs against Boston College. Despite carrying the play for much of the game, the Warriors were unable to get a goal past the Eagle netminder. Fortunately, Ollas was equal to the challenge and held BC off the scoresheet as well. The overtime session was dominated by BC, who fired 13 shots on Ollas, but he stood tall and turned everything aside, forcing the game into a second overtime. The 5th period was a bit more sedate, with only 5 shots combined through 8 minutes. However, the last one came from Mick Messner and gave the Warriors the win.

The offense continued to struggle in the semifinal and only managed one goal through 60 minutes. This time it was Borgiel's turn to be the hero and he shut Lowell down until 31 left in regulation. The River hawks tied the game with an extra attacker and carried that momentum into overtime. Once again Merrimack was outshot, this time by a 19–12 margin, but they were saved by their goaltender. The Warriors played back-to-back double overtime games and, miraculously, a Matt Copponi goal allowed them to win both.

By Making the championship game, and with a little help from other teams losing in the meantime, Merrimack had all but guaranteed itself a spot in the NCAA tournament. At the start of championship Saturday, Merrimack was sitting at #13 in the PairWise rankings. For various reasons, the winners of the Atlantic Hockey, Big Ten and CCHA tournaments would not affect the at-large selections for the NCAA tournament. Only upsets in either the ECAC or NCHC tournaments would knock teams out from the top-15. Unfortunately, if Merrimack lost to BU in the title game, they would slip below Cornell and could be left out of the tournament with those two upsets. With everything to play for, Merrimack got off to a strong start, opening the scoring with a short-handed marker. Because Boston University took a penalty on the play, they saw their own power play end and gave an abbreviated one to the Warriors. Merrimack didn't score, but that was the least of their worries. The Warriors were called for three more minors in the second half of the first and gave BU a 5-on-3 at the start of the second. The Terriers took full advantage and tied the score despite the efforts of Ollas. Luckily, the defense held for the rest of the period and stopped BU from adding to their total. Merrimack regained the lead in the latter part of the period but BU was able to match the goal midway through the third. With neither team giving an inch, Merrimack headed into overtime for the third game in a row. Unfortunately, Lane Hutson scored on the first shot of the extra session and won the title for the Terriers.

In the meantime, Colgate had won the ECAC title and put Merrimack on the edge of the abyss. The team had to sit and watch, hoping that St. Cloud State would prove victorious in their match. When the final score read 3–0 in favor of the Huskies, the Warriors could breathe a sigh of relief. Merrimack was the final entry into the NCAA tournament, their first appearance for the program in 12 years.

=== NCAA tournament ===
While happy to have made the tournament, the team knew that things were only going to be more difficult for them. As a #4 seed, Merrimack was going to get an unfavorable draw and they ended up being set opposite Quinnipiac. The Bobcats had been one of the best teams all season long and were one of the favorites to win the national title at the start of the tournament. From the drop of the puck, Quinnipiac's speed demonstrated why they had had such success during the year as they outshot the Warriors 7–14 in the first period. Borgiel, however, managed to turn everything aside and keep the Bobcats off the scoresheet. Merrimack would have to wait for its opportunity to score on the nation's top defense and hope that Borgiel could keep them in the match in the meantime. Unfortunately, Quinnipiac also possessed the #3 offense in the country and they proved that with a pair of goals just 3:30 into the second period. Down by a pair with their own offensive woes still unsettled, Merrimack needed a big effort from their forwards to get them back into the game. Unfortunately, the Bobcats controlled the puck for the entire game. Merrimack was only able to get 15 shots on goal and none of them found the back of the net. Quinnipiac added three more goals in the third but, without any real offensive push, the Warriors couldn't do anything to stop their season from coming to a close.

== Departures ==
Player	Position	Nationality	Cause
Declan Carlile	Defenseman	United States	Signed professional contract (Tampa Bay Lightning)
Logan Drevitch	Forward	United States	Graduation (signed with Savannah Ghost Pirates)
Jake Durflinger	Forward	United States	Graduation (signed with Florida Everblades)
Steven Jandric	Forward	Canada	Graduation (signed with Worcester Railers)
Regan Kimens	Forward	Canada	Left program (retired)
Troy Kobryn	Goaltender	United States	Transferred to American International
Max Newton	Forward	Canada	Graduation (signed with Worcester Railers)
Ryan Nolan	Forward	United States	Transferred to Michigan State
Zach Uens	Defenseman	Canada	Signed professional contract (Florida Panthers)
Zach Vinnell	Defenseman	Canada	Transferred to Bowling Green
Liam Walsh	Forward	United States	Transferred to Northeastern

== Recruiting ==
Player	Position	Nationality	Age	Notes
Steven Bacovsky	Goaltender	Canada	21	Calgary, AB
Zach Bookman	Defenseman	United States	20	Syracuse, NY
Nikita Borodayenko	Forward	Russia	20	Dmitrov, RUS
Will Calverley	Forward	Canada	24	Scarborough, ON; graduate transfer from RIT
Tristan Crozier	Forward	Canada	24	North Vancouver, BC; graduate transfer from Brown
Trevor Griebel	Forward/Defenseman	United States	21	Tampa, FL
Ryan Leibold	Forward	United States	23	Ashburn, VA; graduate transfer from Holy Cross
Ottoville Leppänen	Forward	Finland	24	Espoo, FIN; graduate transfer from Rensselaer
Tyler Young	Forward	United States	21	Lancaster, MA

== Roster ==
As of September 27, 2022.

No.	Nat.	Player	Class	Pos	Height	Weight	DoB	Hometown	Previous team	NHL rights
1	(Sweden)	Hugo Ollas	Sophomore	G	6' 8" (2.03 m)	253 lb (115 kg)	2002-04-24	Linköping, Sweden	Linköping J20 (J20 Nationell)	NYR, 197th overall 2020
2	(United States)	Christian Felton	Junior	D	6' 1" (1.85 m)	185 lb (84 kg)	2000-02-04	Medina, Ohio	Bentley (AHA)	—
3	(United States)	Zach Bookman	Freshman	D	5' 10" (1.78 m)	175 lb (79 kg)	2002-03-29	Syracuse, New York	Brooks (AJHL)	—
4	(United States)	Mike Brown	Sophomore	D	6' 2" (1.88 m)	202 lb (92 kg)	2001-04-03	Belmont, Massachusetts	Youngstown (USHL)	—
5	(United States)	Trevor Griebel	Freshman	D	5' 10" (1.78 m)	165 lb (75 kg)	2001-03-07	Tampa, Florida	Fargo (USHL)	—
6	(United States)	Kevin Sadovski	Junior	D	6' 1" (1.85 m)	200 lb (91 kg)	1999-07-06	Palm Coast, Florida	Utica (NCDC)	—
7	(Finland)	Ottoville Leppänen	Graduate	F	5' 10" (1.78 m)	185 lb (84 kg)	1998-06-18	Espoo, Finland	RPI (ECAC)	—
8	(Canada)	Liam Dennison	Senior	D	5' 9" (1.75 m)	178 lb (81 kg)	1999-02-07	Manotick, Ontario	Youngstown (USHL)	—
9	(United States)	Ryan Leibold	Graduate	F	5' 10" (1.78 m)	195 lb (88 kg)	1998-11-03	Ashburn, Virginia	Holy Cross (AHA)	—
10	(Canada)	Mark Hillier	Sophomore	F	6' 1" (1.85 m)	180 lb (82 kg)	2002-03-18	Labrador City, Newfoundland and Labrador	Summerside (MHL)	—
11	(United States)	Mick Messner	Graduate	F	5' 11" (1.8 m)	194 lb (88 kg)	1999-04-20	Madison, Wisconsin	Wisconsin (Big Ten)	—
12	(United States)	Jordan Seyfert (A)	Graduate	F	5' 10" (1.78 m)	179 lb (81 kg)	1999-04-03	Annville, Pennsylvania	Fargo (USHL)	—
13	(Canada)	Will Calverley	Graduate	F	5' 9" (1.75 m)	176 lb (80 kg)	1998-07-17	Scarborough, Ontario	RIT (AHA)	—
14	(United States)	Tyler Young	Freshman	F	6' 1" (1.85 m)	180 lb (82 kg)	2001-05-08	Lancaster, Massachusetts	Maryland (NAHL)	—
15	(Sweden)	Hugo Esselin	Senior	F	6' 2" (1.88 m)	197 lb (89 kg)	2000-07-15	Stockholm, Sweden	Djurgårdens J20 (J20 SuperElit)	—
16	(Canada)	Tristan Crozier (A)	Graduate	F	6' 0" (1.83 m)	184 lb (83 kg)	1998-02-23	Calgary, Alberta	Brown (ECAC)	—
17	(United States)	Mac Welsher	Senior	F	5' 8" (1.73 m)	182 lb (83 kg)	1999-04-24	Grosse Pointe Farms, Michigan	Des Moines (USHL)	—
18	(Canada)	Ben Brar (C)	Senior	F	6' 2" (1.88 m)	190 lb (86 kg)	1998-11-19	Abbotsford, British Columbia	Prince George (BCHL)	—
19	(United States)	Alex Jefferies	Junior	F	6' 0" (1.83 m)	190 lb (86 kg)	2001-11-08	Lunenburg, Massachusetts	The Gunnery (USHS–CT)	NYI, 121st overall 2020
21	(United States)	Matt Copponi	Sophomore	F	5' 11" (1.8 m)	165 lb (75 kg)	2003-06-04	Mansfield, Massachusetts	Dexter Southfield (USHS–MA)	—
22	(Canada)	Devlin O'Brien	Sophomore	F	5' 11" (1.8 m)	185 lb (84 kg)	2002-04-05	Toronto, Ontario	Penticton (BCHL)	—
24	(Russia)	Nikita Borodayenko	Freshman	F	6' 0" (1.83 m)	180 lb (82 kg)	2002-06-17	Dmitrov, Russia	Dubuque (USHL)	—
25	(Sweden)	Filip Karlsson-Tägtström	Junior	F	5' 9" (1.75 m)	165 lb (75 kg)	1999-07-14	Stockholm, Sweden	Sioux Falls (USHL)	—
26	(Sweden)	Ivan Zivlak	Sophomore	D	6' 2" (1.88 m)	190 lb (86 kg)	2002-08-08	Gislaved, Sweden	Linköping J20 (J20 Nationell)	—
27	(Sweden)	Adam Arvedson	Sophomore	D	5' 11" (1.8 m)	169 lb (77 kg)	2001-08-30	Karlstad, Sweden	Färjestad (J20 Nationell)	—
28	(Sweden)	Filip Forsmark	Senior	F	5' 11" (1.8 m)	177 lb (80 kg)	1998-06-23	Skövde, Sweden	Tri-City (USHL)	—
29	(United States)	Zachary Borgiel	Junior	G	6' 2" (1.88 m)	212 lb (96 kg)	2000-04-27	Fort Gratiot, Michigan	Cowichan Valley (BCHL)	—

== Standings ==
2022–23 Hockey East Standings
	Conference record										Overall record					
	GP	W	L	T	OTW	OTL	SW	PTS	GF	GA	GP	W	L	T	GF	GA
#4 Boston University †*	24	18	6	0	2	2	0	54	99	62	40	29	11	0	154	106
#14 Merrimack	24	16	8	0	2	4	0	50	72	52	38	23	14	1	106	89
#16 Northeastern	24	14	7	3	0	2	2	49	78	45	35	17	13	5	107	82
Connecticut	24	13	9	2	4	2	2	41	78	71	35	20	12	3	113	96
Massachusetts Lowell	24	11	10	3	2	2	3	39	56	54	36	18	15	3	89	82
Maine	24	9	11	4	1	1	1	32	62	65	36	15	16	5	92	94
Providence	24	9	9	6	3	0	2	32	64	60	37	16	14	7	103	87
Boston College	24	8	11	5	0	0	1	30	70	73	36	14	16	6	104	104
Massachusetts	24	7	14	3	1	3	2	28	55	80	35	13	17	5	94	103
New Hampshire	24	6	15	3	2	2	2	23	44	76	35	11	20	3	74	105
Vermont	24	5	16	3	2	1	1	18	36	76	36	11	20	5	69	103
Championship: March 18, 2023 † indicates regular season champion * indicates conference tournament champion (Lamoriello Trophy); Rankings: USCHO.com Top 20 Poll

== Schedule and results ==
Date	Time	Opponent^{#}	Rank^{#}	Site	TV	Decision	Result	Attendance	Record
Regular Season
October 7	7:00 PM	at St. Lawrence*		Appleton Arena • Canton, New York	ESPN+	Ollas	L 1–3	1,426	0–1–0
October 8	7:00 PM	at #17 Clarkson*		Cheel Arena • Potsdam, New York	ESPN+	Borgiel	W 3–2	2,200	1–1–0
October 18	7:00 PM	New Hampshire		J. Thom Lawler Rink • North Andover, Massachusetts	ESPN+	Ollas	W 6–1	2,814	2–1–0 (1–0–0)
October 21	7:00 PM	Colgate*		J. Thom Lawler Rink • North Andover, Massachusetts	ESPN+	Borgiel	W 5–0	2,072	3–1–0
October 22	7:00 PM	Colgate*		J. Thom Lawler Rink • North Andover, Massachusetts	ESPN+	Ollas	L 3–5	4,031	3–2–0
October 28	7:00 PM	at #5 Massachusetts		Mullins Center • Amherst, Massachusetts	ESPN+	Ollas	L 2–3 ^{OT}	3,150	3–3–0 (1–1–0)
October 29	7:00 PM	#5 Massachusetts		J. Thom Lawler Rink • North Andover, Massachusetts	ESPN+	Ollas	W 2–1 ^{OT}	2,533	4–3–0 (2–1–0)
November 3	7:00 PM	Boston College		J. Thom Lawler Rink • North Andover, Massachusetts	ESPN+	Ollas	W 3–1	2,612	5–3–0 (3–1–0)
November 5	1:00 PM	at Boston College		Conte Forum • Chestnut Hill, Massachusetts	ESPN+	Borgiel	W 5–2	4,101	6–3–0 (4–1–0)
November 11	4:00 PM	Maine	#19	J. Thom Lawler Rink • North Andover, Massachusetts	ESPN+	Ollas	W 1–0	2,186	7–3–0 (5–1–0)
November 12	7:00 PM	Maine	#19	J. Thom Lawler Rink • North Andover, Massachusetts	ESPN+	Borgiel	W 5–3	2,488	8–3–0 (6–1–0)
November 17	7:05 PM	at Sacred Heart*	#15	Total Mortgage Arena • Bridgeport, Connecticut	FloHockey	Ollas	W 3–0	890	9–3–0
November 22	4:00 PM	Holy Cross*	#13	J. Thom Lawler Rink • North Andover, Massachusetts	ESPN+	Borgiel	W 5–1	1,468	10–3–0
November 29	7:00 PM	#8 Connecticut	#12	J. Thom Lawler Rink • North Andover, Massachusetts	ESPN+	Ollas	L 1–3	2,857	10–4–0 (6–2–0)
December 3	3:00 PM	at #8 Connecticut	#12	XL Center • Hartford, Connecticut	ESPN+	Borgiel	W 7–3	3,846	11–4–0 (7–2–0)
December 8	7:00 PM	at #13 Massachusetts	#11	Mullins Center • Amherst, Massachusetts	ESPN+	Ollas	W 2–1	2,797	12–4–0 (8–2–0)
December 10	7:00 PM	at #10 Providence	#11	Schneider Arena • Providence, Rhode Island	NESN, ESPN+	Borgiel	W 3–2	2,618	13–4–0 (9–2–0)
Ledyard Bank Classic
December 30	7:30 PM	at Dartmouth*	#6	Thompson Arena • Hanover, New Hampshire (Ledyard Bank Classic Semifinal)	ESPN+	Borgiel	W 3–2 ^{OT}	2,169	14–4–0
December 31	7:30 PM	vs. #12 Providence*	#6	Thompson Arena • Hanover, New Hampshire (Ledyard Bank Classic Championship)	ESPN+	Ollas	L 1–6	1,229	14–5–0
January 6	7:00 PM	Yale*	#8	J. Thom Lawler Rink • North Andover, Massachusetts	ESPN+	Borgiel	T 3–3 ^{OT}	2,478	14–5–1
January 7	7:00 PM	Brown*	#8	J. Thom Lawler Rink • North Andover, Massachusetts	ESPN+	Ollas	L 2–6	2,134	14–6–1
January 13	7:00 PM	#14 Providence	#10	J. Thom Lawler Rink • North Andover, Massachusetts	ESPN+	Borgiel	L 3–8	2,067	14–7–1 (9–3–0)
January 14	7:00 PM	#14 Providence	#10	J. Thom Lawler Rink • North Andover, Massachusetts	ESPN+	Ollas	W 3–0	2,088	15–7–1 (10–3–0)
January 20	7:00 PM	Northeastern	#11	J. Thom Lawler Rink • North Andover, Massachusetts	ESPN+	Ollas	L 1–5	2,946	15–8–1 (10–4–0)
January 21	7:00 PM	at Northeastern	#11	Matthews Arena • Boston, Massachusetts	NESN, ESPN+	Borgiel	L 0–1	2,526	15–9–1 (10–5–0)
January 27	7:00 PM	at Vermont	#16	Gutterson Fieldhouse • Burlington, Vermont	ESPN+	Borgiel	W 4–2	2,377	16–9–1 (11–5–0)
January 28	7:00 PM	at Vermont	#16	Gutterson Fieldhouse • Burlington, Vermont	ESPN+	Borgiel	L 1–2 ^{OT}	2,745	16–10–1 (11–6–0)
February 3	7:00 PM	at New Hampshire	#15	Whittemore Center • Durham, New Hampshire	ESPN+	Borgiel	L 2–3 ^{OT}	3,536	16–11–1 (11–7–0)
February 5	2:00 PM	at Maine	#15	Alfond Arena • Orono, Maine	ESPN+	Ollas	L 2–3 ^{OT}	3,770	16–12–1 (11–8–0)
February 17	7:00 PM	#5 Boston University	#20	J. Thom Lawler Rink • North Andover, Massachusetts	ESPN+	Borgiel	W 4–1	2,946	17–12–1 (12–8–0)
February 18	6:00 PM	at #5 Boston University	#20	Agganis Arena • Boston, Massachusetts	ESPN+	Ollas	W 4–3 ^{OT}	4,785	18–12–1 (13–8–0)
February 24	7:15 PM	at #19 Massachusetts Lowell	#17	Tsongas Center • Lowell, Massachusetts	NESN, ESPN+	Borgiel	W 5–3	5,025	19–12–1 (14–8–0)
February 25	7:00 PM	#19 Massachusetts Lowell	#17	J. Thom Lawler Rink • North Andover, Massachusetts	ESPN+	Ollas	W 2–0	3,052	20–12–1 (15–8–0)
March 4	7:00 PM	Vermont	#16	J. Thom Lawler Rink • North Andover, Massachusetts	ESPN+	Borgiel	W 4–1	2,017	21–12–1 (16–8–0)
Hockey East Tournament
March 11	7:30 PM	Boston College*	#14	J. Thom Lawler Rink • North Andover, Massachusetts (Quarterfinal)	NESN, ESPN+	Ollas	W 1–0 ^{2OT}	-	22–12–1
March 17	7:30 PM	vs. #20 Massachusetts Lowell*	#14	TD Garden • Boston, Massachusetts (Semifinal)	NESN, ESPN+	Borgiel	W 2–1 ^{2OT}	13,187	23–12–1
March 18	7:00 PM	vs. #5 Boston University*	#14	TD Garden • Boston, Massachusetts (Championship)	NESN, ESPN+	Ollas	L 2–3 ^{OT}	14,306	23–13–1
NCAA Tournament
March 24	5:30 PM	vs. #3 Quinnipiac*	#14	Total Mortgage Arena • Bridgeport, Connecticut (Northeast Regional Semifinal)	ESPNews	Borgiel	L 0–5	4,462	23–14–1
*Non-conference game. ^{#}Rankings from USCHO.com Poll. All times are in Eastern Time. Source:

== Scoring statistics ==
Name	Position	Games	Goals	Assists	Points	PIM
Alex Jefferies	LW	38	14	27	41	16
Matt Copponi	C	37	14	15	29	30
Ben Brar	F	38	14	12	26	39
Ottoville Leppänen	F	38	6	19	25	10
Will Calverley	C	38	5	15	20	27
Filip Forsmark	LW/RW	37	6	10	16	18
Zach Bookman	D	36	4	12	16	16
Slava Demin	D	37	3	13	16	18
Jordan Seyfert	C	35	7	6	13	10
Mac Welsher	C	32	7	5	12	12
Ryan Leibold	F	38	5	7	12	27
Mark Hillier	F	31	3	8	11	4
Tristan Crozier	F	38	2	9	11	4
Mick Messner	LW	35	5	4	9	24
Mike Brown	D	33	4	5	9	27
Christian Felton	D	32	2	4	6	14
Ivan Zivlak	D	38	0	4	4	2
Hugo Esselin	C	19	2	1	3	10
Trevor Griebel	F/D	16	2	0	2	10
Nikita Borodayenko	F	8	1	1	2	5
Liam Dennison	D	17	0	2	2	21
Adam Arvedson	D	26	0	2	2	6
Kevin Sadovski	D	2	0	1	1	0
Filip Karlsson-Tägtström	C	2	0	1	1	0
Hugo Ollas	G	22	0	1	1	0
Devlin O'Brien	LW	2	0	0	0	0
Tyler Young	RW	14	0	0	0	8
Zachary Borgiel	G	20	0	0	0	2
Total			106	184	290	370

== Goaltending statistics ==
Name	Games	Minutes	Wins	Losses	Ties	Goals against	Saves	Shut outs	SV %	GAA
Zachary Borgiel	18	1156:00	13	5	1	40	451	1	.919	2.08
Hugo Ollas	20	1191:48	10	9	0	46	497	5	.915	2.32
Empty Net	-	16:51	-	-	-	3	-	-	-	-
Total	38	2364:39	23	14	1	89	948	6	.914	2.26

== Rankings ==
Poll	Week																											
Poll	Pre	1	2	3	4	5	6	7	8	9	10	11	12	13	14	15	16	17	18	19	20	21	22	23	24	25	26	27 (Final)
USCHO.com	NR	-	NR	NR	NR	NR	NR	19	15	13	12	11	6	-	8	10	11	16	15	19	20	17	16	14	14	14	-	14
USA Today	NR	NR	NR	NR	NR	NR	NR	19	17	14	12	10	5	6	8	10	11	17	18	19	20	16	15	14	14	14	14	14

Note: USCHO did not release a poll in weeks 1, 13, or 26.

== Awards and honors ==
Player	Award	Ref
Alex Jefferies	AHCA East Second Team All-American	
Alex Jefferies	Hockey East First Team	
Hugo Ollas	Hockey East Third Team	
Christian Felton	Hockey East All-Tournament Team	
Matt Copponi	Hockey East All-Tournament Team	

== Players drafted into the NHL ==
=== 2023 NHL entry draft ===
Round	Pick	Player	NHL team
7	216	Matt Copponi	Edmonton Oilers

† incoming freshman
