= 2022–23 Hockey East men's season =

- Season: 2022–23
- Conference: Hockey East
- Division: Division I
- Sport: men's ice hockey
- Duration: October 1, 2022– April 6, 2023
- Number of teams: 11
- TV partner(s): ESPN+, NESN

NHL Entry Draft
- Top draft pick: Matthew Wood
- Picked by: Nashville Predators

Regular Season
- Season champions: Boston University
- Season MVP: Devon Levi
- Top scorer: Lane Hutson

Hockey East tournament
- Tournament champions: Boston University
- Runners-up: Merrimack
- Tournament MVP: Lane Hutson

NCAA tournament
- Bids: 2
- Record: 2–2
- Best Finish: National Semifinal
- Team(s): Boston University

The 2022–23 Hockey East men's season was the 39th season of play for Hockey East and took place during the 2022–23 NCAA Division I men's ice hockey season. The season began on October 1, 2022 and concluded on April 6, 2023.

== Coaches ==
Greg Brown takes over for Jerry York at Boston College. York retired after his 50th season as a head coach with the last 28 being for the Eagles. Brown had previously been an assistant under York for 14 years and was the head coach for the Dubuque Fighting Saints prior to his hiring.

After Albie O'Connell was relieved of his coaching duties after the season, Boston University named his former assistant Jay Pandolfo as the team's head coach. Pandolfo is a BU alum who helped the program win the national championship in 1995. This is his first head coaching job.

=== Records ===
Team	Head coach	Season at school	Record at school	Hockey East record
Boston College	Greg Brown	1	0–0–0	0–0–0
Boston University	Jay Pandolfo	1	0–0–0	0–0–0
Connecticut	Mike Cavanaugh	10	123–151–33	60–71–16
Maine	Ben Barr	2	7–22–4	5–17–2
Massachusetts	Greg Carvel	7	116–88–12	70–59–11
Massachusetts Lowell	Norm Bazin	12	236–130–36	138–87–29
Merrimack	Scott Borek	5	40–72–9	29–54–8
New Hampshire	Michael Souza	5	47–53–17	30–50–13
Northeastern	Jerry Keefe	2	25–13–1	15–8–1
Providence	Nate Leaman	12	225–136–51	134–91–34
Vermont	Todd Woodcroft	3	9–35–4	7–25–4

== Standings ==
2022–23 Hockey East Standings
	Conference record										Overall record					
	GP	W	L	T	OTW	OTL	SW	PTS	GF	GA	GP	W	L	T	GF	GA
#4 Boston University †*	24	18	6	0	2	2	0	54	99	62	40	29	11	0	154	106
#14 Merrimack	24	16	8	0	2	4	0	50	72	52	38	23	14	1	106	89
#16 Northeastern	24	14	7	3	0	2	2	49	78	45	35	17	13	5	107	82
Connecticut	24	13	9	2	4	2	2	41	78	71	35	20	12	3	113	96
Massachusetts Lowell	24	11	10	3	2	2	3	39	56	54	36	18	15	3	89	82
Maine	24	9	11	4	1	1	1	32	62	65	36	15	16	5	92	94
Providence	24	9	9	6	3	0	2	32	64	60	37	16	14	7	103	87
Boston College	24	8	11	5	0	0	1	30	70	73	36	14	16	6	104	104
Massachusetts	24	7	14	3	1	3	2	28	55	80	35	13	17	5	94	103
New Hampshire	24	6	15	3	2	2	2	23	44	76	35	11	20	3	74	105
Vermont	24	5	16	3	2	1	1	18	36	76	36	11	20	5	69	103
Championship: March 18, 2023 † indicates regular season champion * indicates conference tournament champion (Lamoriello Trophy); Rankings: USCHO.com Top 20 Poll

== Non-Conference record ==
=== Regular season record ===
Team	Atlantic Hockey	Big Ten	CCHA	ECAC Hockey	Independent	NCHC	Total
Boston College	1–0–0	0–1–0	0–0–0	1–2–0	1–1–0	0–0–0	3–4–0
Boston University	2–0–0	2–1–0	0–1–0	2–0–0	0–0–0	0–0–0	6–2–0
Connecticut	0–0–0	1–0–1	0–0–0	3–2–0	3–0–0	0–0–0	7–2–1
Maine	3–1–0	0–0–0	0–0–0	1–2–1	2–0–0	0–1–0	6–4–1
Massachusetts	0–0–1	0–0–0	1–0–0	3–1–1	0–0–0	2–0–0	6–1–2
Massachusetts Lowell	1–0–0	1–1–0	0–0–0	3–0–0	0–2–0	1–1–0	6–4–0
Merrimack	2–0–0	0–0–0	0–0–0	3–3–1	0–0–0	0–0–0	5–3–1
New Hampshire	2–1–0	0–0–0	0–0–0	2–3–0	1–1–0	0–0–0	5–5–0
Northeastern	0–2–0	0–0–0	0–0–0	0–2–1	2–0–0	0–1–0	2–5–1
Providence	1–0–1	0–0–0	0–0–0	3–2–0	0–0–0	0–2–0	4–4–1
Vermont	1–1–0	0–0–0	0–0–0	3–1–2	1–1–0	0–0–0	5–3–2
Overall	13–5–2	4–3–1	1–1–0	24–18–6	10–5–0	3–5–0	55–37–9

== Statistics ==
=== Leading scorers ===
GP = Games played; G = Goals; A = Assists; Pts = Points

Player	Class	Team	GP	G	A	Pts
Lane Hutson	Freshman	Boston University	24	9	25	34
Alex Jefferies	Junior	Merrimack	24	13	17	30
Matt Brown	Senior	Boston University	23	10	20	30
Justin Hryckowian	Sophomore	Northeastern	24	14	15	29
Aidan McDonough	Senior	Northeastern	23	14	15	29
Lynden Breen	Junior	Maine	24	14	12	26
Cutter Gauthier	Freshman	Boston College	23	12	13	25
Wilmer Skoog	Senior	Boston University	24	10	13	23
Matthew Wood	Freshman	Connecticut	24	8	15	23
Ryan Tverberg	Junior	Connecticut	24	13	9	22
Nikita Nesterenko	Junior	Boston College	24	7	15	22
Gunnarwolfe Fontaine	Junior	Northeastern	24	6	16	22

=== Leading goaltenders ===
Minimum 1/3 of team's minutes played in conference games.
GP = Games played; Min = Minutes played; W = Wins; L = Losses; T = Ties; GA = Goals against; SO = Shutouts; SV% = Save percentage; GAA = Goals against average

Player	Class	Team	GP	Min	W	L	T	GA	SO	SV%	GAA
Devon Levi	Junior	Northeastern	23	1393:01	14	6	3	42	6	.947	1.81
Henry Welsch	Junior	Massachusetts Lowell	12	577:05	5	4	1	18	2	.928	1.87
Hugo Ollas	Sophomore	Merrimack	14	782:35	8	4	0	26	3	.929	1.99
Gustavs Dāvis Grigals	Graduate	Massachusetts Lowell	15	859:47	6	6	2	32	1	.918	2.23
Victor Östman	Junior	Maine	24	1374:08	9	9	4	53	2	.915	2.31

== Conference tournament ==
Teams are reseeded after the Opening Round and Quarterfinals

Opening Round; March 8
6	Maine	2
11	Vermont	4
7	Providence	2*
10	New Hampshire	1
8	Boston College	5
9	Massachusetts	2

Quarterfinals; March 11
1	Boston University	7
11	Vermont	3
2	Merrimack	1**
8	Boston College	0
3	Northeastern	1
7	Providence	2*
4	Connecticut	1
5	Massachusetts Lowell	2

Semifinals; March 17
1	Boston University	2*
7	Providence	1
2	Merrimack	2**
5	Massachusetts Lowell	1

Championship; March 18
1	Boston University	3*
2	Merrimack	2

Note: * denotes overtime period(s)

== NCAA tournament ==
=== Regional semifinal ===
==== Northeast Regional ====
March 24, 2023; 5:30 PM	(1) Quinnipiac	5 – 0 (0–0, 2–0, 3–0)	(4) Merrimack	Total Mortgage Arena; Attendance: 4,462

Game reference

Yaniv Perets
Goalies
Zachary Borgiel
Referees:
Ryan Hersey
Joe Sullivan
Linesmen:
John Grandt
Tyler Liffrig

(Lee, McGee) Joey Cipollone (7) – GW – 21:56	1–0
(Lipkin, Graf) Jacob Quillan (15) – 23:29	2–0
(Metsa, Friedmann) Michael Lombardi (5) – 46:28	3–0
(Lipkin) Jacob Quillan (16) – 54:41	4–0
(de Jong, Johnson) Sam Lipkin (13) – EN – 58:31	5–0

4 min
Penalties
6 min
35
Shots
15

==== East Regional ====
March 23, 2023; 2:00 PM	(2) Boston University	5 – 1 (1–0, 3–1, 1–0)	(3) Western Michigan	SNHU Arena; Attendance: 3,631

Game reference

Drew Commesso
Goalies
Cameron Rowe
Referees:
Scott Roth
Mike Forys
Linesmen:
Nathan Voll
Tyler Landman

(O'Brien, Phillips) Lane Hutson (15) – 15:24	1–0
(Fensore) Quinn Hutson (15) – GW – 28:53	2–0
(Phillips) Matt Brown (16) – 30:20	3–0
	3–1	32:24 – Jason Polin (30) (McAllister, Washe)
(Wilmer) Wilmer Skoog (15) – 37:16	4–1
(unassisted) Ethan Phillips (3) – EN – 57:34	5–1

8 min
Penalties
8 min
28
Shots
25

=== Regional finals ===
==== East Regional ====
March 25, 2023; 4:00 PM	(2) Boston University	2 – 1 (0–0, 1–0, 1–1)	(4) Cornell	SNHU Arena; Attendance: 7,143

Game reference

Drew Commesso
Goalies
Ian Shane
Referees:
Colin Kronforst
Jonathon Sitarski
Linesmen:
Pat Richardson
Sam Shikowsky

(Wilmer) Wilmer Skoog (16) – 22:13	1–0
(Brown) Ethan Phillips (4) – GW – 47:26	2–0
	2–1	59:32 – Dalton Bancroft (9) (Mitchell, Seger)

6 min
Penalties
6 min
21
Shots
14

=== National semifinals ===
April 6, 2023; 5:00 PM	(W1) Minnesota	6–2 (2–1, 0–1, 4–0)	(E2) Boston University	Amalie Arena; Attendance: 19,119

Game reference

Justen Close
Goalies
Drew Commesso
Referees:
Cameron Lynch
Chris Pitoscia
Linesmen:
Ryan Knapp
Stepen Drain

	0–1	10:38 – Sam Stevens (Fensore, Armstrong)
(Cooley, Nelson) Mike Koster PP – 15:09	1–1
(Huglen) Rhett Pitlick – PP – 15:59	2–1
	2–2	28:06 – PP – Jay O'Brien (Fensore, Brown)
(Koster, Brodzinski) Luke Mittelstadt – PP, GW – 41:40	3–2
(Chesley, Huglen) Luke Mittelstadt – 43:29	4–2
(unassisted) Logan Cooley – EN – 57:19	5–2
(Knies, Faber) Logan Cooley – EN – 58:17	6–2

6 min
Penalties
14 min
34
Shots
31

== Ranking ==
=== USCHO ===
Team	Pre	1	2	3	4	5	6	7	8	9	10	11	12	13	14	15	16	17	18	19	20	21	22	23	24	25	26	Final
Boston College	NR	-	NR	NR	NR	NR	NR	NR	NR	NR	NR	NR	NR	-	NR	20	18	NR	NR	NR	NR	NR	NR	NR	NR	NR	-	NR
Boston University	12	-	9	9	9	9	11	14	11	11	9	7	8	-	6	7	5	4	3	3	5	9	7	5	5	5	-	4
Connecticut	NR	-	20	17	14	10	8	7	7	6	8	8	10	-	9	11	13	12	14	13	14	16	17	19	NR	NR	-	NR
Maine	NR	-	NR	NR	NR	NR	NR	NR	NR	NR	NR	NR	NR	-	NR	NR	NR	NR	NR	NR	NR	NR	NR	NR	NR	NR	-	NR
Massachusetts	10	-	13	13	6	5	5	11	16	17	15	13	15	-	15	19	NR	NR	NR	NR	NR	NR	NR	NR	NR	NR	-	NR
Massachusetts Lowell	17	-	15	16	19	18	17	16	13	14	16	14	13	-	17	16	19	18	16	17	18	19	NR	NR	20	NR	-	NR
Merrimack	NR	-	NR	NR	NR	NR	NR	19	15	13	12	11	6	-	8	10	11	16	15	19	20	17	16	14	14	14	-	14
New Hampshire	NR	-	NR	NR	NR	NR	NR	NR	NR	NR	NR	NR	NR	-	NR	NR	NR	NR	NR	NR	NR	NR	NR	NR	NR	NR	-	NR
Northeastern	8	-	8	7	12	15	16	15	18	18	18	NR	NR	-	NR	NR	NR	20	NR	20	16	15	15	15	16	16	-	16
Providence	15	-	16	15	11	13	14	9	10	8	10	10	12	-	11	14	12	17	NR	NR	NR	NR	NR	NR	NR	NR	-	NR
Vermont	NR	-	NR	NR	NR	NR	NR	NR	NR	NR	NR	NR	NR	-	NR	NR	NR	NR	NR	NR	NR	NR	NR	NR	NR	NR	-	NR

=== USA Today ===
Team	Pre	1	2	3	4	5	6	7	8	9	10	11	12	13	14	15	16	17	18	19	20	21	22	23	24	25	26	Final
Boston College	NR	NR	NR	NR	NR	NR	NR	NR	NR	NR	NR	NR	NR	NR	NR	20	18	NR	NR	NR	NR	NR	NR	NR	NR	NR	NR	NR
Boston University	14	14	12	9	11	9	13	14	9	11	7	6	7	7	6	7	5	5	3	3	5	8	7	6	5	5	4	4
Connecticut	NR	NR	NR	17	13	10	8	8	8	6	8	8	10	10	10	11	16	12	14	14	17	17	18	19	NR	NR	NR	NR
Maine	NR	NR	NR	NR	NR	NR	NR	NR	NR	NR	NR	NR	NR	NR	NR	NR	NR	NR	NR	NR	NR	NR	NR	NR	NR	NR	NR	NR
Massachusetts	10	10	13	14	6	5	5	10	15	17	15	12	15	15	15	17	NR	NR	NR	NR	NR	NR	NR	NR	NR	NR	NR	NR
Massachusetts Lowell	16	16	15	16	20	18	17	16	14	13	16	15	13	13	19	20	20	19	15	20	19	20	NR	NR	NR	NR	NR	NR
Merrimack	NR	NR	NR	NR	NR	NR	NR	19	17	14	12	10	5	6	8	10	11	17	18	19	20	16	15	14	14	14	14	14
New Hampshire	NR	NR	NR	NR	NR	NR	NR	NR	NR	NR	NR	NR	NR	NR	NR	NR	NR	NR	NR	NR	NR	NR	NR	NR	NR	NR	NR	NR
Northeastern	9	9	8	8	14	17	16	15	16	18	19	NR	NR	NR	NR	NR	NR	NR	20	17	16	14	16	16	18	17	18	16
Providence	15	15	16	15	9	13	14	9	9	8	10	11	12	12	11	15	13	17	NR	NR	NR	NR	NR	NR	NR	NR	NR	NR
Vermont	NR	NR	NR	NR	NR	NR	NR	NR	NR	NR	NR	NR	NR	NR	NR	NR	NR	NR	NR	NR	NR	NR	NR	NR	NR	NR	NR	NR

=== Pairwise ===
Team	2	3	4	5	6	7	8	9	10	11	12	14	15	16	17	18	19	20	21	22	23	24	Final
Boston College	22	45	21	19	28	41	35	22	30	25	21	21	18	17	23	27	26	28	23	25	24	26	26
Boston University	3	39	5	9	8	8	1	10	6	7	7	7	9	6	6	3	3	4	8	6	5	5	5
Connecticut	3	4	13	8	7	6	5	3	11	8	9	9	15	18	15	17	14	17	19	19	18	19	20
Maine	22	10	42	21	39	38	47	46	39	35	30	39	38	42	39	31	30	27	27	24	26	29	29
Massachusetts	22	21	3	2	4	7	15	13	12	10	11	16	22	26	28	32	28	29	33	35	29	29	29
Massachusetts Lowell	3	6	17	11	10	12	7	14	16	14	14	27	24	25	22	23	23	23	23	27	24	25	26
Merrimack	22	14	24	37	25	20	12	9	8	6	3	6	6	11	18	21	21	21	19	17	14	14	13
New Hampshire	22	11	23	35	37	43	48	46	50	49	51	57	49	47	50	50	47	46	44	45	46	49	50
Northeastern	15	3	19	23	24	21	23	20	22	25	26	44	32	26	23	19	21	15	14	17	17	19	18
Providence	22	39	11	10	11	5	8	7	14	12	15	12	24	16	19	24	24	24	26	23	26	24	24
Vermont	22	35	44	44	38	42	32	38	46	49	48	49	49	50	47	47	49	49	51	51	49	48	47

Note: teams ranked in the top-10 automatically qualify for the NCAA tournament. Teams ranked 11-16 can qualify based upon conference tournament results.

== Awards ==
=== NCAA ===
Award		Recipient
Mike Richter Award		Devon Levi, Northeastern
AHCA East All-American First Team
Player	Position	Team
Devon Levi	G	Northeastern
Lane Hutson	D	Boston University
Aidan McDonough	F	Northeastern
AHCA East All-American Second Team
Matt Brown	F	Boston University
Alex Jefferies	F	Merrimack

=== Hockey East ===
Award		Recipient
Player of the Year		Devon Levi, Northeastern
Best Defensive Forward		Justin Hryckowian, Northeastern
Best Defensive Defenseman		Hunter McDonald, Northeastern
Rookie of the Year		Lane Hutson, Boston University
Goaltending Champion		Devon Levi, Northeastern
Len Ceglarski Sportmanship Award		Hudson Schandor, Connecticut
Three Stars Award		Lane Hutson, Boston University
Scoring Champion		Lane Hutson, Boston University
Charlie Holt Team Sportsmanship Award		New Hampshire
Bob Kullen Award (Coach of the Year)		Jay Pandolfo, Boston University
All-Hockey East Teams
First Team	Position	Second Team
Devon Levi, Northeastern	G	Victor Östman, Maine
Domenick Fensore, Boston University	D	Scott Morrow, Massachusetts
Lane Hutson, Boston University	D	Ryan Ufko, Massachusetts
Matt Brown, Boston University	F	Lynden Breen, Maine
Alex Jefferies, Merrimack	F	Justin Hryckowian, Northeastern
Aidan McDonough, Northeastern	F	Ryan Tverberg, Connecticut
Third Team	Position	Rookie Team
Gustavs Dāvis Grigals, Massachusetts Lowell	G	
Hugo Ollas, Merrimack	G	
Max Crozier, Providence	D	Lane Hutson, Boston University
Jon McDonald, Massachusetts Lowell	D	Hunter McDonald, Northeastern
Cutter Gauthier, Boston College	F	Kenny Connors, Massachusetts
Parker Ford, Providence	F	Cutter Gauthier, Boston College
Wilmer Skoog, Boston University	F	Ryan Greene, Boston University
	F	Cam Lund, Northeastern
	F	Matthew Wood, Connecticut

==== Conference tournament ====
William Flynn Tournament Most Valuable Player
Lane Hutson		Boston University
All-Tournament Team
Player	Pos	Team
Drew Commesso	G	Boston University
Lane Hutson	D	Boston University
Christian Felton	D	Merrimack
Matt Copponi	F	Merrimack
Devin Kaplan	F	Boston University
Dylan Peterson	F	Boston University

== 2023 NHL entry draft ==
Round	Pick	Player	College	NHL team
1	4	Will Smith ^{†}	Boston College	San Jose Sharks
1	8	Ryan Leonard ^{†}	Boston College	Washington Capitals
1	11	Tom Willander ^{†}	Boston University	Vancouver Canucks
1	15	Matthew Wood	Connecticut	Nashville Predators
1	23	Gabe Perreault ^{†}	Boston College	New York Rangers
1	30	Bradly Nadeau ^{†}	Maine	Carolina Hurricanes
2	38	Michael Hrabal ^{†}	Massachusetts	Arizona Coyotes
3	69	Jacob Fowler ^{†}	Boston College	Montreal Canadiens
3	71	Brandon Svoboda ^{†}	Boston University	San Jose Sharks
3	80	Aydar Suniev ^{†}	Massachusetts	Calgary Flames
3	86	Gavin McCarthy ^{†}	Boston University	Buffalo Sabres
3	90	Drew Fortescue ^{†}	Boston College	New York Rangers
4	117	Larry Keenan ^{†}	Massachusetts	Detroit Red Wings
4	125	Aram Minnetian ^{†}	Boston College	Dallas Stars
5	153	Hudson Malinoski ^{†}	Providence	Toronto Maple Leafs
6	171	Aiden Celebrini ^{†}	Boston University	Vancouver Canucks
6	172	Ryan MacPherson ^{†}	New Hampshire	Philadelphia Flyers
6	182	Ryan Conmy ^{†}	New Hampshire	Los Angeles Kings
7	193	Jack Harvey ^{†}	Boston University	Tampa Bay Lightning
7	215	Nicholas Vantassell ^{†}	Massachusetts	Ottawa Senators
7	216	Matt Copponi	Merrimack	Edmonton Oilers
7	221	Sebastian Bradshaw ^{†}	New Hampshire	Dallas Stars

† incoming freshman
