= 2023 Hockey East men's ice hockey tournament =

- Dates: March 8–18, 2023
- Teams: 11
- Finals site: TD Garden; Boston, Massachusetts
- Champions: Boston University (10th title)
- Winning coach: Jay Pandolfo (1st title)
- MVP: Lane Hutson (Boston University)
- Hockey East men's Ice Hockey Tournaments

The 2023 Hockey East Men's Ice Hockey Tournament was the 38th tournament in the history of the conference. It was played between March 8 and March 18, 2023. As the tournament champions, the Boston University Terriers received the conference's automatic bid into the 2023 NCAA Division I Men's Ice Hockey Tournament.

== Format ==
The tournament includes all eleven teams in the conference, with teams ranked according to their finish in the conference standings. Seeds 1–5 earn a bye into the quarterfinal round, while seeds 6–11 play to determine the remaining quarterfinalists. Winners in the opening round are reseeded and advanced to play top three seeds in reverse order. Winners of the quarterfinal matches are again reseeded for the semifinal, and the winners of those two games face off in the championship.

All series are single-elimination with opening round and quarterfinal matches occurring at home team sites. The two semifinal games and championship match are held at the TD Garden. The tournament champion receives an automatic bid into the NCAA Division I Men's Ice Hockey Tournament.

== Standings ==
2022–23 Hockey East Standings
	Conference record										Overall record					
	GP	W	L	T	OTW	OTL	SW	PTS	GF	GA	GP	W	L	T	GF	GA
#4 Boston University †*	24	18	6	0	2	2	0	54	99	62	40	29	11	0	154	106
#14 Merrimack	24	16	8	0	2	4	0	50	72	52	38	23	14	1	106	89
#16 Northeastern	24	14	7	3	0	2	2	49	78	45	35	17	13	5	107	82
Connecticut	24	13	9	2	4	2	2	41	78	71	35	20	12	3	113	96
Massachusetts Lowell	24	11	10	3	2	2	3	39	56	54	36	18	15	3	89	82
Maine	24	9	11	4	1	1	1	32	62	65	36	15	16	5	92	94
Providence	24	9	9	6	3	0	2	32	64	60	37	16	14	7	103	87
Boston College	24	8	11	5	0	0	1	30	70	73	36	14	16	6	104	104
Massachusetts	24	7	14	3	1	3	2	28	55	80	35	13	17	5	94	103
New Hampshire	24	6	15	3	2	2	2	23	44	76	35	11	20	3	74	105
Vermont	24	5	16	3	2	1	1	18	36	76	36	11	20	5	69	103
Championship: March 18, 2023 † indicates regular season champion * indicates conference tournament champion (Lamoriello Trophy); Rankings: USCHO.com Top 20 Poll

== Bracket ==
Teams are reseeded after the Opening Round and Quarterfinals

Opening Round; March 8
6	Maine	2
11	Vermont	4
7	Providence	2*
10	New Hampshire	1
8	Boston College	5
9	Massachusetts	2

Quarterfinals; March 11
1	Boston University	7
11	Vermont	3
2	Merrimack	1**
8	Boston College	0
3	Northeastern	1
7	Providence	2*
4	Connecticut	1
5	Massachusetts Lowell	2

Semifinals; March 17
1	Boston University	2*
7	Providence	1
2	Merrimack	2**
5	Massachusetts Lowell	1

Championship; March 18
1	Boston University	3*
2	Merrimack	2

Note: * denotes overtime period(s)

== Results ==
=== Opening Round ===
==== (6) Maine vs. (11) Vermont ====
March 8, 2023; 7:00 PM	Maine	2–4 (1–0), (0–1), (1–3)	Vermont	Alfond Arena, Orono, Maine; Attendance: 3,748

Game reference

Victor Ostman
Goalies
Gabe Carriere
Referees:
Geoffrey Miller
Steven Rouillard
Linesmen:
Jeff McCorkle
Steven Murray

(Freel, Breazeale) Lynden Breen (20) – PP – 14:01	1–0
	1–1	26:40 – PP – Timofei Spitserov (4) (Zapernick, Stucker)
(Arnott, Sirota) Lynden Breen (21) – 40:48	2–1
	2–2	47:20 – Andrei Buyalsky (5) (Lombardi)
	2–3	53:55 – PP, GW – Isak Walther (9) (Bouquot, Stucker)
	2–4	59:22 – EN, SH – William Lemay (2) (Zapernick)

10 min
Penalties
8 min
30
Shots
30

==== (7) Providence vs. (10) New Hampshire ====
March 8, 2023; 7:00 PM	Providence	2–1 (OT) (1–0), (0–1), (0–0), (1–0)	New Hampshire	Schneider Arena, Providence, Rhode Island; Attendance: 1,286

Game reference

Philip Svedebäck
Goalies
David Fessenden
Referees:
Walker Holton
Terrence Murphy
Linesmen:
Bill Kingdon
Kyle Richetelle

(Crozier) Craig Needham (5) – 7:01	1–0
	1–1	23:09 – Conor Lovett (1) (Sweeney, Reid)
(Moynihan, Needham) Jamie Engelbert (5) – GW – 61:41	2–1

4 min
Penalties
2 min
30
Shots
23

==== (8) Boston College vs. (9) Massachusetts ====
March 8, 2023; 7:00 PM	Boston College	5–2 (3–1), (1–0), (1–1)	Massachusetts	Conte Forum, Chestnut Hill, Massachusetts; Attendance: 1,376

Game reference

Mitch Benson
Goalies
Cole Brady
Referees:
Scott Hansen
Jeremy Tufts
Linesmen:
Nick Briganti
Kevin Briganti

(Gauthier, Gasseau) Marshall Warren (5) – 1:08	1–0
(Burke) Eamon Powell (5) – 17:07	2–0
	2–1	18:41 – Taylor Makar (10) (Adamson, Mercuri)
(Gauthier, Nesterenko) Andre Gasseau (10) – GW – 19:45	3–1
(Gauthier) Nikita Nesterenko (12) – 29:11	4–1
	4–2	40:22 – Ryan Ukfo (8) (unassisted)
(Gasseau, Warren) Nikita Nesterenko (13) – 4x4 – 43:12	5–2

8 min
Penalties
6 min
42
Shots
18

=== Quarterfinals ===
==== (1) Boston University vs. (11) Vermont ====
March 11, 2023; 4:30 PM	Boston University	7–3 (4–1), (0–0), (3–2)	Vermont	Agganis Arena, Boston, Massachusetts; Attendance: 3,915

Game reference

Drew Commesso
Goalies
Gabe Carriere
Referees:
Scott Hansen
Peter Schlittenhardt
Linesmen:
Bob Bernard
Nicholas Briganti

(Peterson, Wilmer) Nick Zabaneh (6) – 5:49	1–0
(Gallagher, Stevens) Jamie Armstrong (5) – 7:03	2–0
(Peterson, Wilmer) Nick Zabaneh (7) – 8:49	3–0
	3–1	11:42 – PP – Jacques Bouquot (6) (Stucket, Gotz)
(Wilmer, L. Hutson) Wilmer Skoog (13) – PP, GW – 18:29	4–1
	4–2	41:10 – 4x4 – Massimo Lombardi (3) (Gotz, Buyalsky)
(Peterson, McCarthy) Nick Zabaneh (8) – 4x4 – 41:23	5–2
	5–3	45:17 – William Lemay (3) (Bergmanis, Schachle)
(McCarthy, O'Brien) Wilmer Skoog (14) – 47:43	6–3
(Kaplan, Greene) Quinn Hutson (13) – PP – 55:06	7–3

8 min
Penalties
10 min
50
Shots
22

==== (2) Merrimack vs. (8) Boston College ====
March 11, 2023; 7:30 PM	Merrimack	1–0 (2OT) (0–0), (0–0), (0–0), (0–0), (1–0)	Boston College	J. Thom Lawler Rink, North Andover, Massachusetts; Attendance: 2,747

Game reference
Hugo Ollas	Goalies	Mitch Benson	Referees: Walker Holton; Steven Rouillard; Linesmen: Kevin Briganti; Steven Murray
(Leibold, Seyfert) Mick Messner (5) – GW – 88:20 / 1–0			Referees: Walker Holton; Steven Rouillard; Linesmen: Kevin Briganti; Steven Murray
6 min	Penalties	10 min	Referees: Walker Holton; Steven Rouillard; Linesmen: Kevin Briganti; Steven Murray
36	Shots	36	Referees: Walker Holton; Steven Rouillard; Linesmen: Kevin Briganti; Steven Murray

==== (3) Northeastern vs. (7) Providence ====
March 11, 2023; 7:00 PM	Northeastern	1–2 (OT) (1–0), (0–1), (0–0), (0–1)	Providence	Matthews Arena, Boston, Massachusetts; Attendance: 2,192

Game reference

Devon Levi
Goalies
Philip Svedebäck
Referees:
Brad LeBlanc
Geoff Miller
Linesmen:
Robert Griffin
Jeff McCorkle

(Walsh, Struble) Cam Lund (7) – PP – 9:44	1–0
	1–1	33:11 – Parker Ford (12) (Harding, Duran)
	1–2	64:00 – GW – Brady Berard (1) (Richard, Harding)

4 min
Penalties
4 min
26
Shots
34

==== (4) Connecticut vs. (5) Massachusetts Lowell ====
March 11, 2023; 4:00 PM	Connecticut	1–2 (0–2), (0–0), (1–0)	Massachusetts Lowell	Toscano Family Ice Forum, Storrs, Connecticut; Attendance: 2,691

Game reference

Arsenii Sergeev
Goalies
Gustavs Davis Grigals
Referees:
Terrence Murphy
Jeremy Tufts
Linesmen:
Bill Kingdon
Kyle Richetelle

	0–1	8:51 – Blake Wells (2) (Meehan)
	0–2	14:35 – GW – Owen Cole (6) (McDonald, Fowler)
(Wood) Nick Capone (9) – EA – 58:31	1–2

4 min
Penalties
2 min
41
Shots
17

=== Semifinals ===
==== (1) Boston University vs. (7) Providence ====
March 17, 2023; 4:00 PM	Boston University	2–1 (OT) (0–0), (0–0), (1–1), (1–0)	Providence	TD Garden, Boston, Massachusetts; Attendance: 13,187

Game reference

Drew Commesso
Goalies
Philip Svedebäck
Referees:
Walker Holton
Terence Murphy
Linesmen:
Nicholas Briganti
Steven Murphy

	0–1	52:25 – Bennett Schimek (11) (Valente, Ruikka)
(Greene, L. Hutson) Dylan Peterson (5) – 57:28	1–1
(Tuch, Greene) Quinn Hutson (14) – GW – 70:52	2–1

6 min
Penalties
6 min
25
Shots
38

==== (2) Merrimack vs. (5) Massachusetts Lowell ====
March 17, 2023; 7:30 PM	Merrimack	2–1 (2OT) (0–0), (0–0), (1–1), (0–0), (1–0)	Massachusetts Lowell	TD Garden, Boston, Massachusetts; Attendance: 13,187

Game reference

Zachary Borgiel
Goalies
Gustavs Davis Grigals
Referees:
Scott Hansen
Geoff Miller
Linesmen:
Jeff McCorkle
Kyle Richetelle

(Demin, Leibold) Jordan Seyfert (7) – 49:34	1–0
	1–1	59:29 – EA – Scout Truman (8) (Fowler, Stella)
(Leppanen) Matt Copponi (14) – GW – 90:05	2–1

2 min
Penalties
2 min
42
Shots
36

=== Championship ===
==== (1) Boston University vs. (2) Merrimack ====
March 18, 2023; 7:00 PM	Boston University	3–2 (OT) (0–1), (1–1), (1–0), (1–0)	Merrimack	TD Garden, Boston, Massachusetts; Attendance: 14.306

Game reference

Drew Commesso
Goalies
Hugo Ollas
Referees:
Steven Rouillard
Jeremy Tufts
Linesmen:
Kevin Briganti
Bill Kingdon

	0–1	6:57 – SH – Christian Felton (2) (Brar)
(Fensore, Kaplan) Lane Hutson (13) – 5x3 – 20:38	1–1
	1–2	35:09 – Mac Welsher (7) (Crozier)
(Armstrong, Greene) Devin Kaplan (10) – 49:02	2–2
(Brown, Stevens) Lane Hutson (14) – GW – 61:57	3–2

4 min
Penalties
10 min
30
Shots
25

== Tournament Awards ==
=== All-Tournament Team ===
- Goaltender – Drew Commesso, Boston University
- Defenceman – Lane Hutson, Boston University
- Defenceman – Christian Felton, Merrimack
- Forward – Matt Copponi, Merrimack
- Forward – Devin Kaplan, Boston University
- Forward – Dylan Peterson, Boston University

=== Tournament MVP ===
- Lane Hutson, Boston University
