= 2022–23 Providence Friars men's ice hockey season =

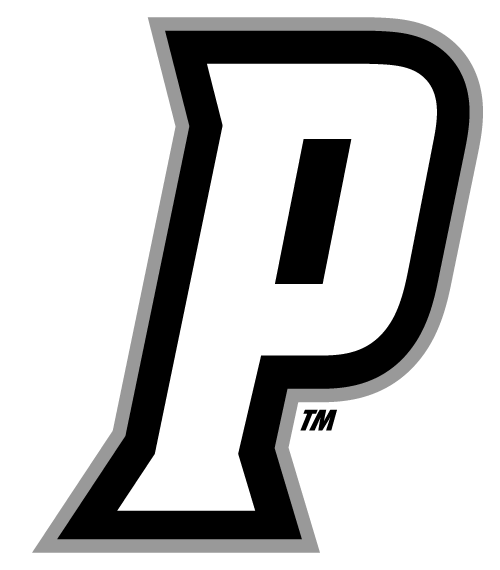

Ledyard Bank Classic, Champion
- Conference: T–6th Hockey East
- Home ice: Schneider Arena

Rankings
- USCHO: NR
- USA Today: NR

Record
- Overall: 16–14–7
- Conference: 9–9–6
- Home: 9–5–3
- Road: 5–8–4
- Neutral: 2–1–0

Coaches and captains
- Head coach: Nate Leaman
- Assistant coaches: Ron Rolston; Joel Beal; Bruce Irving
- Captain: Parker Ford
- Alternate captain: Max Crozier

The 2022–23 Providence Friars Men's ice hockey season was the 72nd season of play for the program and 39th in Hockey East. The Friars represented Providence College in the 2022–23 NCAA Division I men's ice hockey season, were coached by Nate Leaman in his 12th season, and played their home games at Schneider Arena.

== Season ==
Despite losing nearly half of the players from the previous season, Providence shot out of the gate with a tremendous start to the season. Using a very strong defense to insulate freshman starter Philip Svedebäck, the Friars won their first three games before dropping a weekend series with defending national champion, Denver. The losses didn't seem to slow them down since, as soon as they got back east, Providence went undefeated over a 9-game stretch. The streak included a sweep of then-#5 Massachusetts and put the Friars at the top of the Hockey East standings. The team ran into a little trouble just before the winter break but, as Christmas approached, Providence was well on its way to making the NCAA tournament.

While the first half of the season could hardly have gone better, the second half turned into a nightmare. The offense stalled in the back half of the year, averaging just over 2 goals per game and was shutout four times, as opposed to over 3 goals per game in the first half and no shutouts. While the goaltending was solid, if unspectacular, Providence's inability to score caused the team to tumble down the conference standings as the losses began to mount. A 5-game losing skid knocked the Friars out of the polls and their playoff chances dwindled. Providence finished the regular season by going 3–9–2 in its final 14 games and finished 1 game above .500.

When the team's postseason began, the Friars knew they had to win the conference tournament for any chance at an NCAA berth. The offense continued to be a problem when Providence took on a surging New Hampshire squad. The defense did its job and stymied the Wildcats, holding them to just 23 shot, but the offense needed extra time to get the game winner. Their quarterfinal game was eerily similar to the UNH match as Providence and Northeastern fought to a 1–1 draw after 60 minutes. Brady Berard's 1st goal of the season 4 minutes into overtime sent the Friars into the semifinal and a date with top-seeded Boston University. The PC defense continued to hold down the opposition's scoring chances, holding BU to just 15 shots in regulation. Unfortunately, the Friars were again only able to score once in regulation and a third consecutive overtime game was required. BU took over in the extra session and fired 10 pucks on goal in under 11 minutes. The final one got past Svedebäck and ended Providence's run.

== Departures ==
Player	Position	Nationality	Cause
Davis Bunz	Defenseman	United States	Graduation (signed with Wheeling Nailers)
Austin Cain	Goaltender	Canada	Graduation (retired)
Michael Callahan	Defenseman	United States	Graduation (signed with Boston Bruins)
Garrett Devine	Forward	United States	Left program (retired)
Alex Esposito	Forward	United States	Graduation (signed with Iowa Heartlanders)
Kyle Koopman	Defenseman	United States	Graduation (retired)
Matt Koopman	Forward	United States	Graduate transfer to Massachusetts
Tomáš Mazura	Forward	Czech Republic	Transferred to St. Lawrence
Ben Mirageas	Defenseman	United States	Graduation (retired)
Kohen Olischefski	Forward	Canada	Graduation (signed with Rochester Americans)
Luke Perunovich	Defenseman	United States	Graduate transfer to St. Thomas
Jimmy Scannell	Goaltender	United States	Graduation (retired)
Jaxson Stauber	Goaltender	United States	Signed professional contract (Chicago Blackhawks)

== Recruiting ==
Player	Position	Nationality	Age	Notes
Brady Berard	Forward	United States	18	East Greenwich, RI
Jaroslav Chmelař	Forward	Czech Republic	19	Nové Město nad Metují, CZE; selected 144th overall in 2021
Chase Dafoe	Forward	United States	20	Beverly, MA
John Driscoll	Goaltender	United States	22	Huntley, IL; sophomore walk-on
Connor Kelley	Defenseman	United States	20	Maple Grove, MN; transfer from Minnesota Duluth; selected 204th overall in 2021
Austen May	Defenseman	United States	19	Woodhaven, MI
Grant Porter	Forward	Canada	20	Weston, MA
Austin Roden	Goaltender	Canada	24	Surrey, BC; transfer from Omaha
Bennett Schimek	Forward	United States	19	Mendota Heights, MN
Garrett Sundquist	Defenseman	United States	21	South Glastonbury, CT
Philip Svedebäck	Goaltender	Sweden	20	Stockholm, SWE; selected 117th overall in 2021
Liam Valente	Forward	Sweden	19	Märsta, SWE

== Roster ==
As of August 22, 2022.

No.	Nat.	Player	Class	Pos	Height	Weight	DoB	Hometown	Previous team	NHL rights
1	(United States)	John Driscoll	Sophomore	G	5' 11" (1.8 m)	170 lb (77 kg)	2000-04-09	Milton, Massachusetts	Northeast Generals (NA3HL)	—
2	(United States)	Luke Johnson	Senior	D	5' 11" (1.8 m)	173 lb (78 kg)	1999-01-07	Edina, Minnesota	Sioux City Musketeers (USHL)	—
3	(United States)	Austen May	Freshman	D	5' 11" (1.8 m)	160 lb (73 kg)	2003-05-19	Woodhaven, Michigan	Sioux Falls Stampede (USHL)	—
4	(Canada)	Guillaume Richard	Sophomore	D	6' 2" (1.88 m)	175 lb (79 kg)	2003-02-10	Cap-Santé, Quebec	Tri-City Storm (USHL)	CBJ, 101st overall 2021
5	(United States)	Garrett Sundquist	Sophomore	D	6' 3" (1.91 m)	205 lb (93 kg)	2001-07-17	South Glastonbury, Connecticut	Sioux Falls Stampede (USHL)	—
6	(United States)	Cam McDonald	Senior	D	5' 9" (1.75 m)	175 lb (79 kg)	2001-02-03	Eagle River, Alaska	Muskegon Lumberjacks (USHL)	—
8	(United States)	Riley Duran	Sophomore	F	6' 2" (1.88 m)	180 lb (82 kg)	2002-01-25	Woburn, Massachusetts	Youngstown Phantoms (USHL)	BOS, 182nd overall 2020
9	(United States)	Patrick Moynihan	Senior	F	5' 11" (1.8 m)	185 lb (84 kg)	2001-01-23	Millis, Massachusetts	USNTDP (USHL)	NJD, 158th overall 2019
10	(United States)	Brady Berard	Freshman	F	6' 1" (1.85 m)	198 lb (90 kg)	2004-02-26	East Greenwich, Rhode Island	USNTDP (USHL)	NJD, 158th overall 2019
11	(United States)	Michael Citara	Sophomore	F	5' 10" (1.78 m)	160 lb (73 kg)	2002-04-22	New Hope, Pennsylvania	Sioux Falls Stampede (USHL)	—
12	(Canada)	Nick Poisson	Junior	F	5' 11" (1.8 m)	185 lb (84 kg)	2001-08-15	Vancouver, British Columbia	Prince George Spruce Kings (BCHL)	—
13	(United States)	Craig Needham	Senior	F	5' 10" (1.78 m)	180 lb (82 kg)	1999-03-31	Medford, Massachusetts	Youngstown Phantoms (USHL)	—
14	(Canada)	Chase Dafoe	Freshman	F	6' 3" (1.91 m)	200 lb (91 kg)	2002-02-25	Peachland, British Columbia	West Kelowna Warriors (BCHL)	—
15	(Sweden)	Liam Valente	Freshman	F	5' 11" (1.8 m)	183 lb (83 kg)	2003-05-23	Märsta, Sweden	Linköping J20 (J20 Nationell)	—
17	(United States)	Chase Yoder	Junior	F	5' 11" (1.8 m)	185 lb (84 kg)	2002-05-28	Fairview, Texas	USNTDP (USHL)	PIT, 170th overall 2020
18	(Canada)	Jamie Engelbert	Senior	F	6' 4" (1.93 m)	205 lb (93 kg)	2000-06-21	Cobourg, Ontario	Cobourg Cougars (OJHL)	—
19	(Canada)	Cody Monds	Sophomore	F	5' 9" (1.75 m)	170 lb (77 kg)	2001-02-09	Brockville, Ontario	Fargo Force (USHL)	—
20	(United States)	Parker Ford (C)	Senior	F	5' 9" (1.75 m)	180 lb (82 kg)	2000-07-20	Wakefield, Rhode Island	Sioux City Musketeers (USHL)	—
21	(United States)	Brett Berard	Junior	F	5' 9" (1.75 m)	165 lb (75 kg)	2002-09-09	East Greenwich, Rhode Island	USNTDP (USHL)	NYR, 134th overall 2020
22	(Finland)	Uula Ruikka	Junior	D	5' 9" (1.75 m)	170 lb (77 kg)	2000-05-28	Oulu, Finland	Chicago Steel (USHL)	—
23	(United States)	Bennett Schimek	Freshman	F	6' 0" (1.83 m)	188 lb (85 kg)	2003-04-15	Mendota Heights, Minnesota	Sioux City Musketeers (USHL)	—
24	(Canada)	Max Crozier (A)	Senior	D	6' 2" (1.88 m)	185 lb (84 kg)	2000-04-19	Calgary, Alberta	Sioux Falls Stampede (USHL)	TBL, 120th overall 2019
25	(United States)	Connor Kelley	Junior	D	6' 1" (1.85 m)	190 lb (86 kg)	2002-01-30	Maple Grove, Minnesota	Minnesota Duluth (NCHC)	CHI, 204th overall 2021
26	(United States)	Grant Porter	Freshman	F	5' 11" (1.8 m)	180 lb (82 kg)	2002-02-21	Weston, Massachusetts	Youngstown Phantoms (USHL)	—
27	(Canada)	Taige Harding	Sophomore	D	6' 7" (2.01 m)	230 lb (104 kg)	2002-01-03	St. Albert, Alberta	Fort McMurray Oil Barons (AJHL)	CHI, 91st overall 2021
28	(Czech Republic)	Jaroslav Chmelař	Freshman	F	6' 4" (1.93 m)	216 lb (98 kg)	2003-07-20	Nové Město nad Metují, Czech Republic	Jokerit U20 (U20 SM-sarja)	NYR, 144th overall 2021
29	(United States)	Will Schimek	Sophomore	D	6' 2" (1.88 m)	200 lb (91 kg)	2001-05-22	Mendota Heights, Minnesota	Sioux Falls Stampede (USHL)	—
35	(Sweden)	Philip Svedebäck	Freshman	G	6' 4" (1.93 m)	210 lb (95 kg)	2002-05-28	Växjö, Sweden	Dubuque Fighting Saints (USHL)	BOS, 117th overall 2021
36	(Canada)	Austin Roden	Senior	G	6' 1" (1.85 m)	185 lb (84 kg)	1998-04-30	Victoria, British Columbia	Omaha (NCHC)	—

== Standings ==
2022–23 Hockey East Standings
	Conference record										Overall record					
	GP	W	L	T	OTW	OTL	SW	PTS	GF	GA	GP	W	L	T	GF	GA
#4 Boston University †*	24	18	6	0	2	2	0	54	99	62	40	29	11	0	154	106
#14 Merrimack	24	16	8	0	2	4	0	50	72	52	38	23	14	1	106	89
#16 Northeastern	24	14	7	3	0	2	2	49	78	45	35	17	13	5	107	82
Connecticut	24	13	9	2	4	2	2	41	78	71	35	20	12	3	113	96
Massachusetts Lowell	24	11	10	3	2	2	3	39	56	54	36	18	15	3	89	82
Maine	24	9	11	4	1	1	1	32	62	65	36	15	16	5	92	94
Providence	24	9	9	6	3	0	2	32	64	60	37	16	14	7	103	87
Boston College	24	8	11	5	0	0	1	30	70	73	36	14	16	6	104	104
Massachusetts	24	7	14	3	1	3	2	28	55	80	35	13	17	5	94	103
New Hampshire	24	6	15	3	2	2	2	23	44	76	35	11	20	3	74	105
Vermont	24	5	16	3	2	1	1	18	36	76	36	11	20	5	69	103
Championship: March 18, 2023 † indicates regular season champion * indicates conference tournament champion (Lamoriello Trophy); Rankings: USCHO.com Top 20 Poll

== Schedule and results ==
Date	Time	Opponent^{#}	Rank^{#}	Site	TV	Decision	Result	Attendance	Record
Exhibition
October 1	2:00 PM	Western Ontario*	#15	Schneider Arena • Providence, Rhode Island (Exhibition)	ESPN+	Roden	W 5–1	2,812	
October 2	2:00 PM	at #7 Quinnipiac*	#15	M&T Bank Arena • Hamden, Connecticut (Exhibition)	ESPN+	Svedebäck	L 2–4	0	
Regular Season
October 7	7:00 PM	Sacred Heart*	#16	Schneider Arena • Providence, Rhode Island	ESPN+	Svedebäck	W 6–1	2,706	1–0–0
October 13	7:00 PM	Clarkson*	#15	Schneider Arena • Providence, Rhode Island	ESPN+	Svedebäck	W 5–2	1,992	2–0–0
October 15	7:30 PM	at #7 Northeastern	#15	Matthews Arena • Boston, Massachusetts	ESPN+	Svedebäck	W 2–1	4,742	3–0–0 (1–0–0)
October 21	9:00 PM	at #4 Denver*	#11	Magness Arena • Denver, Colorado	Evoca	Svedebäck	L 1–4	5,218	3–1–0
October 22	8:00 PM	at #4 Denver*	#11	Magness Arena • Denver, Colorado	Evoca	Svedebäck	L 2–3	6,324	3–2–0
October 28	7:00 PM	at New Hampshire	#13	Whittemore Center • Durham, New Hampshire	ESPN+	Svedebäck	T 2–2 ^{SOW}	3,906	3–2–1 (1–0–1)
October 29	7:00 PM	New Hampshire	#13	Schneider Arena • Providence, Rhode Island	NESN+, ESPN+	Svedebäck	W 3–1	2,333	4–2–1 (2–0–1)
November 4	7:00 PM	#5 Massachusetts	#14	Schneider Arena • Providence, Rhode Island	NESN, ESPN+	Svedebäck	W 7–4	2,981	5–2–1 (3–0–1)
November 5	7:00 PM	at #5 Massachusetts	#14	Mullins Center • Amherst, Massachusetts	ESPN+	Svedebäck	W 4–3 ^{OT}	4,790	6–2–1 (4–0–1)
November 11	7:00 PM	#7 Connecticut	#9	Schneider Arena • Providence, Rhode Island	ESPN+	Svedebäck	T 1–1 ^{SOL}	3,310	6–2–2 (4–0–2)
November 12	3:05 PM	at #7 Connecticut	#9	XL Center • Hartford, Connecticut	ESPN+	Svedebäck	T 6–6 ^{SOL}	-	6–2–3 (4–0–3)
November 18	7:00 PM	Vermont	#9	Schneider Arena • Providence, Rhode Island	ESPN+	Roden	W 4–0	2,258	7–2–3 (5–0–3)
November 19	7:00 PM	Vermont	#9	Schneider Arena • Providence, Rhode Island	ESPN+	Roden	W 4–3 ^{OT}	2,176	8–2–3 (6–0–3)
November 25	7:00 PM	St. Lawrence*	#8	Schneider Arena • Providence, Rhode Island	ESPN+	Svedebäck	W 4–3	1,615	9–2–3
November 26	7:00 PM	Brown*	#8	Schneider Arena • Providence, Rhode Island (Mayor's Cup)	ESPN+	Roden	L 2–3	1,885	9–3–3
December 2	7:00 PM	at Boston College	#10	Conte Forum • Chestnut Hill, Massachusetts	ESPN+	Svedebäck	T 1–1 ^{SOW}	5,119	9–3–4 (6–0–4)
December 3	7:00 PM	Boston College	#10	Schneider Arena • Providence, Rhode Island	ESPN+	Svedebäck	T 2–2 ^{SOL}	3,042	9–3–5 (6–0–5)
December 10	7:00 PM	#11 Merrimack	#10	Schneider Arena • Providence, Rhode Island	NESN, ESPN+	Svedebäck	L 2–3	2,618	9–4–5 (6–1–5)
Ledyard Bank Classic
December 30	4:00 PM	vs. Yale*	#12	Thompson Arena • Hanover, New Hampshire (Ledyard Bank Classic Semifinal)	ESPN+	Svedebäck	W 3–0	1,252	10–4–5
December 31	7:30 PM	vs. #6 Merrimack*	#12	Thompson Arena • Hanover, New Hampshire (Ledyard Bank Classic Championship)	ESPN+	Svedebäck	W 6–1	1,229	11–4–5
Regular Season
January 6	7:00 PM	New Hampshire	#11	Schneider Arena • Providence, Rhode Island	ESPN+	Svedebäck	L 0–2	2,842	11–5–5 (6–2–5)
January 8	2:00 PM	at Army*	#11	Tate Rink • West Point, New York	FloHockey	Svedebäck	T 3–3 ^{OT}	2,214	11–5–6
January 13	7:00 PM	at #10 Merrimack	#14	J. Thom Lawler Rink • North Andover, Massachusetts	ESPN+	Svedebäck	W 8–3	2,067	12–5–6 (7–2–5)
January 14	7:00 PM	at #10 Merrimack	#14	J. Thom Lawler Rink • North Andover, Massachusetts	ESPN+	Svedebäck	L 0–3	2,088	12–6–6 (7–3–5)
January 17	7:00 PM	at Princeton*	#12	Hobey Baker Memorial Rink • Princeton, New Jersey	ESPN+	Svedebäck	L 2–3	1,553	12–7–6
January 27	7:00 PM	at Maine	#17	Alfond Arena • Orono, Maine	ESPN+	Svedebäck	L 2–3	3,476	12–8–6 (7–4–5)
January 28	7:00 PM	at Maine	#17	Alfond Arena • Orono, Maine	ESPN+	Svedebäck	L 0–3	4,441	12–9–6 (7–5–5)
February 3	7:00 PM	Massachusetts		Schneider Arena • Providence, Rhode Island	NESN+, ESPN+	Svedebäck	L 2–3	3,236	12–10–6 (7–6–5)
February 5	2:00 PM	at Vermont		Gutterson Fieldhouse • Burlington, Vermont	ESPN+	Svedebäck	W 3–1	2,435	13–10–6 (8–6–5)
February 10	7:00 PM	#20 Northeastern		Schneider Arena • Providence, Rhode Island	ESPN+	Svedebäck	T 3–3 ^{SOL}	2,972	13–10–7 (8–6–6)
February 17	7:00 PM	#18 Massachusetts Lowell		Schneider Arena • Providence, Rhode Island	ESPN+	Svedebäck	W 3–2 ^{OT}	2,626	14–10–7 (9–6–6)
February 18	6:05 PM	at #18 Massachusetts Lowell		Tsongas Center • Lowell, Massachusetts	ESPN+	Svedebäck	L 1–2	4,675	14–11–7 (9–7–6)
March 3	7:00 PM	at #7 Boston University		Agganis Arena • Boston, Massachusetts	NESN+, ESPN+	Roden	L 4–6	4,846	14–12–7 (9–8–6)
March 4	7:00 PM	#7 Boston University		Schneider Arena • Providence, Rhode Island	NESN+, ESPN+	Roden	L 0–2	2,476	14–13–7 (9–9–6)
Hockey East Tournament
March 8	7:00 PM	New Hampshire*		Schneider Arena • Providence, Rhode Island (First Round)	ESPN+	Svedebäck	W 2–1 ^{OT}	1,286	15–13–7
March 11	7:00 PM	at #15 Northeastern*		Matthews Arena • Boston, Massachusetts (Quarterfinal)	NESN+, ESPN+	Svedebäck	W 2–1 ^{OT}	2,192	16–13–7
March 17	4:00 PM	vs. #5 Boston University*		TD Garden • Boston, Massachusetts (Semifinal)	NESN, ESPN+	Svedebäck	L 1–2 ^{OT}	13,187	16–14–7
*Non-conference game. ^{#}Rankings from USCHO.com Poll. All times are in Eastern Time. Source:

== Scoring statistics ==
Name	Position	Games	Goals	Assists	Points	PIM
Parker Ford	C/RW	37	12	14	26	22
Brett Berard	LW	36	10	14	24	35
Max Crozier	D	37	3	21	24	33
Bennett Schimek	F	37	11	9	20	12
Nick Poisson	F	37	10	10	20	17
Riley Duran	C	29	8	12	20	33
Taige Harding	D	37	4	13	17	19
Chase Yoder	C	37	8	7	15	14
Jaroslav Chmelar	LW/RW	33	7	6	13	26
Liam Valente	C/LW	30	3	8	11	10
Patrick Moynihan	RW	34	7	3	10	41
Jamie Engelbert	C	37	5	5	10	14
Craig Needham	C	37	5	4	9	16
Guillaume Richard	D	31	1	7	8	6
Cody Monds	RW	25	2	5	7	4
Uula Ruikka	D	29	1	5	6	28
Cam McDonald	D	37	1	5	6	15
Connor Kelley	D	21	0	6	6	10
Austen May	RW	21	3	1	4	4
Brady Berard	C	34	1	2	3	8
Luke Johnson	D	12	0	3	3	0
Michael Citara	RW	8	1	1	2	2
Garrett Sundquist	D	2	0	1	1	0
Austin Roden	RW	5	0	1	1	0
William Schimek	D	12	0	1	1	6
Grant Porter	F	1	0	0	0	0
Chase Dafoe	F	8	0	0	0	0
Philip Svedebäck	G	34	0	0	0	0
Total			103	164	267	375

== Goaltending statistics ==
Name	Games	Minutes	Wins	Losses	Ties	Goals Against	Saves	Shut Outs	SV %	GAA
Philip Svedebäck	34	2013:08	14	11	7	73	733	1	.909	2.18
Austin Roden	8	249:11	2	3	0	12	80	1	.870	2.89
Empty Net	-	17:44	-	-	-	2	-	-	-	-
Total	37	2284:03	16	14	7	87	813	2	.903	2.29

== Rankings ==
Poll	Week																											
Poll	Pre	1	2	3	4	5	6	7	8	9	10	11	12	13	14	15	16	17	18	19	20	21	22	23	24	25	26	27 (Final)
USCHO.com	15	-	16	15	11	13	14	9	10	8	10	10	12	-	11	14	12	17	NR	NR	NR	NR	NR	NR	NR	NR	-	NR
USA Today	15	15	16	15	9	13т	14	9	9	8	10	11	12	12	11	15	13	16	NR	NR	NR	NR	NR	NR	NR	NR	NR	NR

Note: USCHO did not release a poll in weeks 1, 13, or 26.

== Awards and honors ==
Player	Award	Ref
Max Crozier	Hockey East Third Team	
Parker Ford	Hockey East Third Team	

== Players drafted into the NHL ==
=== 2023 NHL entry draft ===
Round	Pick	Player	NHL team
5	153	Hudson Malinoski ^{†}	Toronto Maple Leafs

† incoming freshman
