= 2022–23 UMass Minutemen ice hockey season =

- Conference: 9th Hockey East
- Home ice: Mullins Center

Rankings
- USCHO: NR
- USA Today: NR

Record
- Overall: 13–17–5
- Conference: 7–14–3
- Home: 7–6–3
- Road: 4–9–1
- Neutral: 2–2–1

Coaches and captains
- Head coach: Greg Carvel
- Assistant coaches: Tom Upton; Nolan Gluchowski; Jacob Pritchard
- Captain: Eric Faith
- Alternate captain(s): Jerry Harding; Reed Lebster

The 2022–23 UMass Minutemen ice hockey season was the 91st season of play for the program, the 30th at the Division I level, and 29th in Hockey East. The Minutemen represented the University of Massachusetts Amherst in the 2022–23 NCAA Division I men's ice hockey season were coached by Greg Carvel in his 7th season, and played their home games at Mullins Center.

== Season ==
In the offseason, Garrett Wait suffered a potentially career-ending knee injury during a workout. He was medically disqualified from playing during the 2022–23 season. Beside Wait, the Minumemen would have to deal with the loss of several key players as their leaders on offense (Bobby Trivigno), defense (Matthew Kessel) and in goal (Matt Murray) all had to be replaced. Coach Carvel brought in a talent-laden recruiting class to do just that with 4 freshmen who were already NHL draft picks as well as two drafted transfers. UMass was ranked highly entering the season, making the top 10 in both polls and was picked to finish 3rd in Hockey East.

Early on, everything looked to be going well for the Minutemen. After an iffy start, the team swept the defending national champions, Denver, and were undefeated through their first 6 games. An overtime loss to Merrimack dented their record slightly but by the beginning of November, UMass was in the top-5 and seemingly well on their way to another NCAA tournament. Unfortunately, once the team got into conference play, the defense began to falter. Massachusetts was unable to provide its netminders with much support, allowing more than 34 shots against per game. The increased opportunities turned into goals and, despite having a nearly identical save percentage, the Minutemen allowed 15 more goals against in 2 fewer games. While those numbers weren't disastrous by themselves, the team had also declined on the offensive side. None of the team's players were able to make up for the loss of its top three forwards and just one player was able to get into double-digit goal totals. The team scored 23 fewer goals than the year before, putting them at a -38 goal differential.

Despite the trouble, UMass recovered during the holidays and held a winning record in early January. At the Frozen Fenway, the team began a 6-game losing streak and dropped out of the polls for the first time in years. They were able to recover to finish out the final 8 games at a .500 clip. The Minutemen had done so poorly in their conference games that the team finished 9th in the standings and were forced to start in the first round. They faced Boston College in a battle between two disappointing teams. UMass hardly put up a fight, getting outshot 18–42 and ending its season with a 2–5 loss.

== Departures ==
Player	Position	Nationality	Cause
Matt Baker	Forward	Canada	Graduation (signed with Adirondack Thunder)
Anthony Del Gaizo	Forward	United States	Graduation (retired)
Slava Demin	Defenseman	United States	Graduate transfer to Merrimack
Cam Donaldson	Forward	United States	Graduation (retired)
Ty Farmer	Defenseman	United States	Graduate transfer to North Dakota
Colin Felix	Defenseman	United States	Graduation (signed with Lehigh Valley Phantoms)
Matthew Kessel	Defenseman	United States	Signed professional contract (St. Louis Blues)
Josh Lopina	Forward	United States	Signed professional contract (Anaheim Ducks)
Oliver MacDonald	Forward	United States	Transferred to Western Michigan
Matt Murray	Goaltender	Canada	Graduation (signed with Texas Stars)
Bobby Trivigno	Forward	United States	Graduation (signed with New York Rangers)

== Recruiting ==
Player	Position	Nationality	Age	Notes
Mikey Adamson	Defenseman	United States	21	Quincy, MA
Harrison Ballard	Forward	United States	18	Scottsdale, AZ
Cole Brady	Goaltender	Canada	21	Pickering, ON; transfer from Arizona State; selected 127th overall in 2019
Michael Cameron	Forward	United States	20	Berwyn, PA
Kenny Connors	Forward	United States	19	Glen Mills, PA; selected 103rd overall in 2022
Tyson Dyck	Forward	Canada	18	Abbotsford, BC; selected 206th overall in 2022
Noah Ellis	Defenseman	United States	20	Urbandale, IA; selected 184th overall in 2020
Matt Koopman	Forward	United States	24	Marblehead, MA; graduate transfer from Providence
Elliott McDermott	Defenseman	Canada	23	Kingston, ON; transfer from Colgate
Owen Murray	Defenseman	Canada	19	Decker, MB
Joshua Nodler	Forward	United States	21	Oak Park, MI; transfer from Michigan State; selected 150th overall in 2019
Kennedy O'Connor	Defenseman	United States	21	Springfield, MA
Cole O'Hara	Forward	Canada	20	Richmond Hill, ON; selected 114th overall in 2022

== Roster ==
As of August 6, 2022.

No.	Nat.	Player	Class	Pos	Height	Weight	DoB	Hometown	Previous team	NHL rights
1	(United States)	Luke Pavicich	Sophomore	G	6' 3" (1.91 m)	190 lb (86 kg)	2002-03-21	Clarence Center, New York	Kenai River Brown Bears (NAHL)	—
3	(United States)	Mikey Adamson	Freshman	D	5' 9" (1.75 m)	170 lb (77 kg)	2001-08-16	Quincy, Massachusetts	Sioux City Musketeers (USHL)	—
4	(United States)	Kennedy O'Connor	Freshman	D	6' 2" (1.88 m)	194 lb (88 kg)	2001-05-10	Springfield, Massachusetts	Omaha Lancers (USHL)	—
5	(United States)	Linden Alger	Junior	D	6' 3" (1.91 m)	194 lb (88 kg)	2000-04-09	Centerville, Massachusetts	Youngstown Phantoms (USHL)	—
6	(United States)	Ryan Ufko	Sophomore	D	5' 10" (1.78 m)	181 lb (82 kg)	2003-05-07	Smithtown, New York	Chicago Steel (USHL)	NSH, 115th overall 2021
7	(United States)	Cal Kiefiuk	Senior	F	5' 10" (1.78 m)	185 lb (84 kg)	2000-02-28	Macomb, Michigan	Central Illinois Flying Aces (USHL)	—
9	(United States)	Matt Koopman	Graduate	F	5' 10" (1.78 m)	180 lb (82 kg)	1998-05-01	Marblehead, Massachusetts	Providence (HEA)	—
10	(Canada)	Cole O'Hara	Freshman	F	6' 0" (1.83 m)	183 lb (83 kg)	2002-06-20	Richmond Hill, Ontario	Tri-City Storm (USHL)	NSH, 114th overall 2022
11	(Canada)	Lucas Mercuri	Sophomore	F	6' 3" (1.91 m)	192 lb (87 kg)	2002-03-07	Montreal, Quebec	Des Moines Buccaneers (USHL)	CAR, 159th overall 2020
12	(United States)	Garrett Wait	Graduate	F	6' 0" (1.83 m)	190 lb (86 kg)	1998-06-13	Edina, Minnesota	Minnesota (Big Ten)	—
13	(United States)	Reed Lebster (A)	Senior	F	6' 0" (1.83 m)	188 lb (85 kg)	1999-03-04	Grand Rapids, Michigan	Des Moines Buccaneers (USHL)	—
14	(United States)	Ryan Lautenbach	Sophomore	F	5' 11" (1.8 m)	175 lb (79 kg)	2000-02-27	Brighton, Michigan	Omaha Lancers (USHL)	—
17	(United States)	Kenny Connors	Freshman	F	6' 1" (1.85 m)	190 lb (86 kg)	2003-03-10	Glen Mills, Pennsylvania	Dubuque Fighting Saints (USHL)	LAK, 103rd overall 2022
18	(Canada)	Taylor Makar	Sophomore	F	6' 3" (1.91 m)	190 lb (86 kg)	2001-03-13	Calgary, Alberta	Brooks Bandits (AJHL)	COL, 220th overall 2021
19	(United States)	Ryan Sullivan	Junior	F	5' 11" (1.8 m)	190 lb (86 kg)	2000-03-07	Grosse Pointe, Michigan	Sioux Falls Stampede (USHL)	—
20	(United States)	Josh Nodler	Senior	F	5' 10" (1.78 m)	195 lb (88 kg)	2001-04-27	Oak Park, Michigan	Michigan State (Big Ten)	CGY, 150th overall 2019
21	(United States)	Noah Ellis	Freshman	D	6' 2" (1.88 m)	192 lb (87 kg)	2002-02-01	Urbandale, Iowa	Muskegon Lumberjacks (USHL)	VGK, 184th overall 2020
22	(United States)	Jerry Harding (A)	Senior	F	6' 2" (1.88 m)	210 lb (95 kg)	1999-03-22	Canton, Massachusetts	Providence (HEA)	—
23	(United States)	Scott Morrow	Sophomore	D	6' 2" (1.88 m)	192 lb (87 kg)	2002-11-01	Darien, Connecticut	Shattuck-Saint Mary's (Midget AAA)	CAR, 40th overall 2021
24	(Canada)	Elliott McDermott	Junior	D	5' 11" (1.8 m)	193 lb (88 kg)	1999-02-03	Kingston, Ontario	Colgate (ECAC)	—
25	(United States)	Aaron Bohlinger	Junior	D	5' 9" (1.75 m)	165 lb (75 kg)	2000-08-25	Walden, New York	Waterloo Black Hawks (USHL)	—
26	(Canada)	Owen Murray	Freshman	D	5' 10" (1.78 m)	181 lb (82 kg)	2002-12-01	Decker, Manitoba	Green Bay Gamblers (USHL)	—
27	(United States)	Michael Cameron	Freshman	F	5' 10" (1.78 m)	174 lb (79 kg)	2002-07-24	Berwyn, Pennsylvania	Omaha Lancers (USHL)	—
28	(Canada)	Eric Faith (C)	Senior	F	5' 11" (1.8 m)	181 lb (82 kg)	1998-04-18	Carp, Ontario	Brockville Braves (CCHL)	—
29	(Canada)	Eric DeDobbelaer	Sophomore	F	5' 10" (1.78 m)	180 lb (82 kg)	2000-06-15	Brantford, Ontario	Brantford 99ers (OJHL)	—
32	(United States)	Henry Graham	Junior	G	6' 0" (1.83 m)	181 lb (82 kg)	2000-07-25	Manhattan, New York	P.A.L. Jr. Islanders (NCDC)	—
34	(Canada)	Cole Brady	Junior	G	6' 5" (1.96 m)	181 lb (82 kg)	2001-02-12	Pickering, Ontario	Arizona State (NCAA)	NJD, 127th overall 2019
40	(Canada)	Tyson Dyck	Freshman	F	6' 0" (1.83 m)	170 lb (77 kg)	2004-02-06	Abbotsford, British Columbia	Cranbrook Bucks (BCHL)	OTT, 206th overall 2022

== Standings ==
2022–23 Hockey East Standings
	Conference record										Overall record					
	GP	W	L	T	OTW	OTL	SW	PTS	GF	GA	GP	W	L	T	GF	GA
#4 Boston University †*	24	18	6	0	2	2	0	54	99	62	40	29	11	0	154	106
#14 Merrimack	24	16	8	0	2	4	0	50	72	52	38	23	14	1	106	89
#16 Northeastern	24	14	7	3	0	2	2	49	78	45	35	17	13	5	107	82
Connecticut	24	13	9	2	4	2	2	41	78	71	35	20	12	3	113	96
Massachusetts Lowell	24	11	10	3	2	2	3	39	56	54	36	18	15	3	89	82
Maine	24	9	11	4	1	1	1	32	62	65	36	15	16	5	92	94
Providence	24	9	9	6	3	0	2	32	64	60	37	16	14	7	103	87
Boston College	24	8	11	5	0	0	1	30	70	73	36	14	16	6	104	104
Massachusetts	24	7	14	3	1	3	2	28	55	80	35	13	17	5	94	103
New Hampshire	24	6	15	3	2	2	2	23	44	76	35	11	20	3	74	105
Vermont	24	5	16	3	2	1	1	18	36	76	36	11	20	5	69	103
Championship: March 18, 2023 † indicates regular season champion * indicates conference tournament champion (Lamoriello Trophy); Rankings: USCHO.com Top 20 Poll

== Schedule and results ==
Date	Time	Opponent^{#}	Rank^{#}	Site	TV	Decision	Result	Attendance	Record
Exhibition
October 1	7:00 PM	Sacred Heart*	#10	Mullins Center • Amherst, Massachusetts (Exhibition)		Graham	L 2–3		
Regular Season
October 8	7:05 PM	at American International*	#13	MassMutual Center • Springfield, Massachusetts	FloHockey	Pavicich	T 2–2 ^{OT}	1,144	0–0–1
October 14	7:00 PM	#1 Denver*	#13	Mullins Center • Amherst, Massachusetts	ESPN+	Pavicich	W 4–2	7,297	1–0–1
October 15	7:30 PM	#1 Denver*	#13	Mullins Center • Amherst, Massachusetts	ESPN+	Pavicich	W 3−0	6,315	2−0−1
October 21	7:00 PM	Union*	#6	Mullins Center • Amherst, Massachusetts	ESPN+	Pavicich	W 7–1	3,721	3–0–1
October 22	7:00 PM	Union*	#6	Mullins Center • Amherst, Massachusetts	ESPN+	Brady	W 7–0	3,737	4–0–1
October 28	7:00 PM	Merrimack	#5	Mullins Center • Amherst, Massachusetts	ESPN+	Pavicich	W 3–2 ^{OT}	3,150	5–0–1 (1–0–0)
October 29	7:00 PM	at Merrimack	#5	J. Thom Lawler Rink • North Andover, Massachusetts	ESPN+	Brady	L 1–2 ^{OT}	2,533	5–1–1 (1–1–0)
November 4	7:00 PM	at #14 Providence	#5	Schneider Arena • Providence, Rhode Island	NESN, ESPN+	Pavicich	L 4–7	2,981	5–2–1 (1–2–0)
November 5	7:00 PM	#14 Providence	#5	Mullins Center • Amherst, Massachusetts	ESPN+	Pavicich	L 3–4 ^{OT}	4,790	5–3–1 (1–3–0)
November 11	7:00 PM	#14 Boston University	#11	Mullins Center • Amherst, Massachusetts	NESN, ESPN+	Pavicich	L 2–7	5,197	5–4–1 (1–4–0)
November 12	7:00 PM	at #14 Boston University	#11	Agganis Arena • Boston, Massachusetts	ESPN+	Brady	L 1–5	4,869	5–5–1 (1–5–0)
November 18	7:00 PM	at New Hampshire	#16	Whittemore Center • Durham, New Hampshire	NESN, ESPN+	Pavicich	W 4–2	4,506	6–5–1 (2–5–0)
Friendship Four
November 25	2:00 PM	vs. #14 Massachusetts Lowell*	#17	SSE Arena Belfast • Belfast, Northern Ireland (Friendship Four Semifinal)		Pavicich	W 2–1	5,487	7–5–1
November 26	2:00 PM	vs. #4 Quinnipiac*	#17	SSE Arena Belfast • Belfast, Northern Ireland (Friendship Four Championship)		Pavicich	T 2–2 ^{SOL}	5,893	7–5–2
December 3	7:00 PM	#16 Massachusetts Lowell	#15	Mullins Center • Amherst, Massachusetts	NESN+, ESPN+	Pavicich	T 1–1 ^{SOL}	5,579	7–5–3 (2–5–1)
December 7	7:00 PM	#11 Merrimack	#13	Mullins Center • Amherst, Massachusetts	ESPN+	Pavicich	L 1–2	2,797	7–6–3 (2–6–1)
Holiday Face–Off
December 28	5:00 PM	vs. Clarkson*	#15	Fiserv Forum • Milwaukee, Wisconsin (Holiday Face–Off Semifinal)	BSW+	Pavicich	L 3–6	-	7–7–3
December 29	5:00 PM	vs. Lake Superior State*	#15	Fiserv Forum • Milwaukee, Wisconsin (Holiday Face–Off Consolation)	BSW+	Graham	W 4–1	-	8–7–3
Regular Season
January 3	7:00 PM	Brown*	#15	Mullins Center • Amherst, Massachusetts	ESPN+	Pavicich	W 3–0	2,070	9–7–3
January 7	6:00 PM	vs. Boston College*	#15	Fenway Park • Boston, Massachusetts (Frozen Fenway)	NESN, ESPN+	Pavicich	L 2–4	22,500	9–8–3
January 11	7:00 PM	at #7 Boston University	#19	Agganis Arena • Boston, Massachusetts	ESPN+	Pavicich	L 2–6	2,721	9–9–3 (2–7–1)
January 15	3:00 PM	New Hampshire	#19	Mullins Center • Amherst, Massachusetts	NESN, ESPN+	Graham	L 1–3	4,246	9–10–3 (2–8–1)
January 20	7:00 PM	#13 Connecticut		Mullins Center • Amherst, Massachusetts	NESN+, ESPN+	Graham	L 3–4 ^{OT}	3,411	9–11–3 (2–9–1)
January 21	4:30 PM	at #13 Connecticut		Toscano Family Ice Forum • Storrs, Connecticut	ESPN+	Pavicich	L 1–3	2,691	9–12–3 (2–10–1)
January 27	7:15 PM	at #18 Massachusetts Lowell		Tsongas Center • Lowell, Massachusetts	NESN+, ESPN+	Pavicich	L 0–1	6,339	9–13–3 (2–11–1)
February 3	7:00 PM	at Providence		Schneider Arena • Providence, Rhode Island	NESN+, ESPN+	Pavicich	W 3–2	3,236	10–13–3 (3–11–1)
February 10	7:00 PM	Vermont		Mullins Center • Amherst, Massachusetts	ESPN+	Graham	T 4–4 ^{SOW}	4,314	10–13–4 (3–11–2)
February 11	7:00 PM	Vermont		Mullins Center • Amherst, Massachusetts	NESN, ESPN+	Pavicich	T 3–3 ^{SOW}	4,320	10–13–5 (3–11–3)
February 17	7:00 PM	at Boston College		Conte Forum • Chestnut Hill, Massachusetts	ESPN+	Pavicich	L 3–7	5,328	10–14–5 (3–12–3)
February 18	7:00 PM	Boston College		Mullins Center • Amherst, Massachusetts	ESPN+	Brady	L 1–3	5,278	10–15–5 (3–13–3)
February 24	7:00 PM	#15 Northeastern		Mullins Center • Amherst, Massachusetts	ESPN+	Brady	W 3–2	4,638	11–15–5 (4–13–3)
February 25	7:30 PM	at #15 Northeastern		Matthews Arena • Boston, Massachusetts	ESPN+	Brady	L 0–4	4,407	11–16–5 (4–14–3)
March 3	7:00 PM	at Maine		Alfond Arena • Orono, Maine	ESPN+	Brady	W 5–2	4,272	12–16–5 (5–14–3)
March 4	7:00 PM	at Maine		Alfond Arena • Orono, Maine	ESPN+	Brady	W 4–3	5,043	13–16–5 (6–14–3)
Hockey East Tournament
March 8	7:00 PM	at Boston College*		Conte Forum • Chestnut Hill, Massachusetts	NESN+, ESPN+	Brady	L 2–5	1,376	13–17–5
*Non-conference game. ^{#}Rankings from USCHO.com Poll. All times are in Eastern Time. Source:

== Scoring statistics ==
Name	Position	Games	Goals	Assists	Points	PIM
Scott Morrow	D	35	9	22	31	16
Kenny Connors	C	32	9	17	26	8
Ryan Ufko	D	32	8	16	24	25
Reed Lebster	RW	30	8	14	22	6
Cal Kiefiuk	F	31	7	14	21	29
Cole O'Hara	RW	32	4	13	17	14
Ryan Lautenbach	RW	33	4	10	14	20
Lucas Mercuri	C	35	3	11	14	33
Taylor Makar	C/LW	32	10	2	12	54
Michael Cameron	C	31	9	3	12	0
Tyson Dyck	C	28	5	4	9	8
Matt Koopman	C	35	5	4	9	0
Aaron Bohlinger	D	25	2	7	9	8
Eric Faith	LW	33	1	6	7	16
Jerry Harding	F	32	1	5	6	8
Josh Nodler	C/RW	27	2	3	5	8
Ryan Sullivan	F	32	2	1	3	8
Owen Murray	D	21	1	2	3	12
Elliott McDermott	D	35	1	2	3	10
Mikey Adamson	D	11	1	1	2	4
Noah Ellis	D	23	1	1	2	6
Kennedy O'Connor	D	21	0	2	2	2
Linden Alger	D	11	1	0	1	6
Cole Brady	G	12	0	1	1	2
Eric DeDobbelaer	C/RW	2	0	0	0	0
Henry Graham	G	8	0	0	0	0
Luke Pavicich	G	23	0	0	0	0
Total			94	161	255	393

== Goaltending statistics ==
Name	Games	Minutes	Wins	Losses	Ties	Goals against	Saves	Shut outs	SV %	GAA
Henry Graham	11	256:16	1	2	1	10	117	0	.921	2.34
Luke Pavicich	24	1265:40	8	10	4	58	671	2	.920	2.75
Cole Brady	17	600:06	4	5	0	31	303	1	.907	3.10
Empty Net	-	14:01	-	-	-	4	-	-	-	-
Total	35	2122:02	13	17	3	103	1091	3	.914	2.89

== Rankings ==
Poll	Week																											
Poll	Pre	1	2	3	4	5	6	7	8	9	10	11	12	13	14	15	16	17	18	19	20	21	22	23	24	25	26	27 (Final)
USCHO.com	10	-	13	13	6	5 (2)	5 (1)	11	16	17	15	13	15	-	15	19	NR	NR	NR	NR	NR	NR	NR	NR	NR	NR	-	NR
USA Today	10	10	13	14	6	5 (4)	5	10	15	17	15	12	15	15	15	17	NR	NR	NR	NR	NR	NR	NR	NR	NR	NR	NR	NR

Note: USCHO did not release a poll in weeks 1, 13, or 26.

== Players drafted into the NHL ==
=== 2023 NHL entry draft ===
Round	Pick	Player	NHL team
2	38	Michael Hrabal ^{†}	Arizona Coyotes
3	80	Aydar Suniev ^{†}	Calgary Flames
4	117	Larry Keenan ^{†}	Detroit Red Wings
7	215	Nicholas Vantassell ^{†}	Ottawa Senators

† incoming freshman
