= 2022–23 UMass Lowell River Hawks men's ice hockey season =

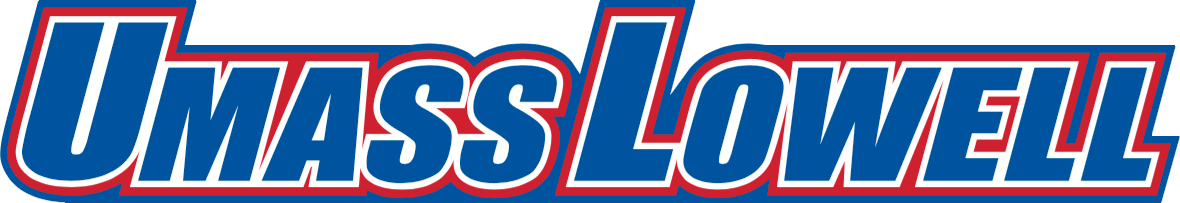
- Conference: 5th Hockey East
- Home ice: Tsongas Center

Rankings
- USCHO: NR
- USA Today: NR

Record
- Overall: 18–15–3
- Conference: 11–9–3
- Home: 10–5–2
- Road: 7–8–1
- Neutral: 1–2–0

Coaches and captains
- Head coach: Norm Bazin
- Assistant coaches: Andy Jones; Taylor Nelson; Tom Ford
- Captain(s): Carl Berglund; Jon McDonald
- Alternate captain(s): Zach Kaiser; Blake Wells

The 2022–23 UMass Lowell River Hawks Men's ice hockey season was the 56th season of play for the program, the 40th competing at the Division I level and 39th in Hockey East. The River Hawks represented the University of Massachusetts Lowell in the 2022–23 NCAA Division I men's ice hockey season, were coached by Norm Bazin in his 12th season and played their home games at Tsongas Center.

== Season ==
Despite a great deal of roster turnover, the River Hawks were expected to compete for the NCAA tournament. While the loss of starter Owen Savory would be difficult to overcome, the addition of grad transfer Gustavs Dāvis Grigals was expected to soften the blow. Grigals did perform well for Lowell while understudy Henry Welsch also shone when given the chance. Unfortunately, the Hawk's offense, which had only been average last year, worsened when the scoring of Andre Lee and Lucas Condotta could not be fully replaced.

Lowell hovered around the .500 mark for most of the season but stayed on the positive side the entire time. Early on, that served the team well as Hockey East sat high in the rankings. Even with just an okay record of 10–6–1, Lowell was above the cutoff line for the NCAA tournament when they stopped for the winter break. The team's chances was dealt a heavy blow upon their return to the ice when they were swept at home by Alaska Anchorage, a team that was playing its first hockey in nearly three years. Lowell dropped 13 places in the rankings, settling in the high-20s and needed a strong second half to recover. They started out well, going 5–1 in their next six games but the River Hawks slumped in the later portion of the season, winning just 2 out of their final 9 matches. To make matters worse, seemingly the entire conference fell apart in the second half of the year and Lowell received less credit for their wins as time went on.

By the end of the regular season, Lowell was sitting well outside of the NCAA bubble and would likely need to win the Hockey East championship to make an appearance. While the team was fortunate enough to receive a bye into the conference quarterfinals, they still had to travel for their match. The River Hawks met Connecticut, who were also fighting for their postseason lives, and the team had a tall task to reach the semifinals. Luckily, Lowell got off to a good start and scored twice in the first period. Carrying a 2–0 lead into the second, the Hawks played defense the rest of the game, only getting 5 shots on goal, but the maneuver worked and UMass Lowell escaped with a 2–1 win. In the next round, Merrimack too had to win to keep their season alive and Warriors showed great desperation early in the game. Merrimack outshot Lowell 22–7 in the first 40 minutes but, thanks to a stellar effort from Grigals, neither team was able to score. The Warriors finally broke through with about 10 minutes to play and caused Lowell to throw caution to the wind and begin their own attack. The River Hawk offense finally showed some life and were able to get the tying goal with just 31 second left in regulation. Lowell continued to get their chances once overtime began but could not beat Zachary Borgiel. In third minutes of extra hockey, UML outshot Merrimack 19–12 but it was the Warriors who managed to nab the game-winner and Lowell would have to wait for another year.

== Departures ==
Player	Position	Nationality	Cause
Matt Allen	Forward	United States	Transferred to Alaska Anchorage
Nick Austin	Defenseman	United States	Graduation (retired)
Lucas Condotta	Forward	Canada	Graduation (signed with Montreal Canadiens)
Matt Kinash	Forward	Canada	Transferred to Alaska Anchorage
Sam Knoblauch	Forward	United States	Graduation (retired)
Josh Latta	Forward	Canada	Transferred to Bentley
Andre Lee	Forward	Sweden	Signed professional contract (Los Angeles Kings)
Owen Savory	Goaltender	Canada	Graduation (signed with Laval Rocket)
Jordan Schulting	Defenseman	Canada	Transferred to Bentley
Connor Sodergren	Forward	United States	Graduation (retired)
Reid Stefanson	Forward	Canada	Graduation (signed with Maine Mariners)
Jackson Sterrett	Forward	United States	Left program (retired)

== Recruiting ==
Player	Position	Nationality	Age	Notes
Mitchell Becker	Defenseman	United States	21	Rogers, MN
Dillan Bentley	Forward	United States	21	Peoria, IL
Jack Collins	Forward	United States	20	Canton, NY
Mark Cooper	Defenseman	Canada	21	Dunnville, ON
Filip Fornåå Svensson	Forward	Sweden	23	Linköping, SWE; transfer from Alaska
Owen Fowler	Forward	United States	20	Tewksbury, MA
Gustavs Dāvis Grigals	Goaltender	Latvia	24	Riga, LAT; graduate transfer from Alaska
Nick Rhéaume	Forward	Canada	20	Sherbrooke, QC
T. J. Schweighardt	Defenseman	United States	21	Wayne, NJ
Jake Stella	Forward	Sweden	23	Karlstad, SWE; transfer from American International
Roc Truman	Forward	Canada	21	Lethbridge, AB
Scout Truman	Forward	Canada	19	Lethbridge, AB

== Roster ==
As of September 14, 2022.

No.	Nat.	Player	Class	Pos	Height	Weight	DoB	Hometown	Previous team	NHL rights
1	(Sweden)	Edvard Nordlund	Sophomore	G	6' 2" (1.88 m)	176 lb (80 kg)	2001-07-12	Nacka, Sweden	Danbury Jr. Hat Tricks (NAHL)	—
2	(United States)	Mitchell Becker	Freshman	D	6' 3" (1.91 m)	220 lb (100 kg)	2001-05-24	Rogers, Minnesota	New Mexico Ice Wolves (NAHL)	—
4	(United States)	T. J. Schweighardt	Freshman	D	5' 10" (1.78 m)	180 lb (82 kg)	2001-03-15	Wayne, New Jersey	Youngstown Phantoms (USHL)	—
5	(Canada)	Owen Cole	Sophomore	F	5' 10" (1.78 m)	173 lb (78 kg)	2000-01-29	Dunnville, Ontario	Brooks Bandits (AJHL)	—
6	(Sweden)	Isac Jonsson	Sophomore	D	5' 10" (1.78 m)	173 lb (78 kg)	2000-10-08	Ängelholm, Sweden	Tri-City Storm (USHL)	—
7	(Canada)	Mark Cooper	Freshman	D	5' 10" (1.78 m)	185 lb (84 kg)	2001-03-01	Cambridge, Ontario	Hawkesbury Hawks (CCHL)	—
8	(Germany)	Nik Armstrong-Kingkade	Junior	F	5' 9" (1.75 m)	185 lb (84 kg)	1999-05-01	Mannheim, Germany	Minot Minotauros (NAHL)	—
9	(United States)	Jack Collins	Freshman	F	6' 4" (1.93 m)	215 lb (98 kg)	2001-11-13	Canton, New York	Lone Star Brahmas (NAHL)	—
10	(United States)	Brehdan Engum	Junior	D	6' 2" (1.88 m)	215 lb (98 kg)	2000-08-10	Burnsville, Minnesota	Waterloo Black Hawks (USHL)	—
11	(United States)	Jon McDonald (C)	Graduate	D	6' 0" (1.83 m)	180 lb (82 kg)	1998-06-15	Livonia, Michigan	Fargo Force (USHL)	—
12	(Canada)	Roc Truman	Freshman	F	6' 0" (1.83 m)	195 lb (88 kg)	2001-04-25	Lethbridge, Alberta	Camrose Kodiaks (AJHL)	—
13	(Sweden)	Filip Fornåå Svensson	Graduate	F	6' 4" (1.93 m)	215 lb (98 kg)	1999-01-05	Linköping, Sweden	Alaska (NCAA)	—
14	(United States)	Ben Meehan	Junior	D	6' 0" (1.83 m)	190 lb (86 kg)	2001-04-20	Walpole, Massachusetts	Cedar Rapids RoughRiders (USHL)	LAK, 140th overall 2020
16	(United States)	Owen Fowler	Freshman	F	5' 9" (1.75 m)	182 lb (83 kg)	2002-06-04	Tewksbury, Massachusetts	Sioux City Musketeers (USHL)	—
17	(Slovakia)	Marek Korenčík	Senior	D	6' 3" (1.91 m)	200 lb (91 kg)	1999-07-19	Žilina, Slovakia	Luleå J20 (J20 SuperElit)	—
18	(Sweden)	Carl Berglund (C)	Junior	F	6' 2" (1.88 m)	195 lb (88 kg)	2000-01-16	Hammarö, Sweden	Sioux Falls Stampede (USHL)	—
19	(United States)	Dillan Bentley	Freshman	F	6' 4" (1.93 m)	190 lb (86 kg)	2001-03-31	Peoria, Illinois	New Mexico Ice Wolves (NAHL)	—
21	(United States)	Brian Chambers	Senior	F	6' 1" (1.85 m)	180 lb (82 kg)	1998-07-24	Weymouth, Massachusetts	Sioux Falls Stampede (USHL)	—
22	(Canada)	Blake Wells (A)	Senior	F	6' 2" (1.88 m)	200 lb (91 kg)	1999-08-02	Blackie, Alberta	Okotoks Oilers (AJHL)	—
23	(Canada)	Zach Kaiser (A)	Senior	F	6' 1" (1.85 m)	180 lb (82 kg)	1998-09-06	Orangeville, Ontario	Sherwood Park Crusaders (AJHL)	—
24	(Canada)	Scout Truman	Freshman	F	5' 10" (1.78 m)	185 lb (84 kg)	2002-10-15	Lethbridge, Alberta	Des Moines Buccaneers (USHL)	—
25	(United States)	Matt Crasa	Sophomore	F	5' 11" (1.8 m)	185 lb (84 kg)	2001-03-04	South Setauket, New York	Fargo Force (USHL)	—
26	(Canada)	Nick Rhéaume	Freshman	F	6' 2" (1.88 m)	200 lb (91 kg)	2002-05-02	Trois-Rivières, Quebec	Prince George Spruce Kings (BCHL)	—
27	(United States)	Stefan Owens	Sophomore	F	5' 10" (1.78 m)	169 lb (77 kg)	2000-04-24	Midlothian, Virginia	Maine Nordiques (NAHL)	—
28	(Sweden)	Jake Stella	Junior	F	5' 11" (1.8 m)	187 lb (85 kg)	1998-11-14	Karlstad, Sweden	American International (AHA)	—
29	(Canada)	Ryan Brushett	Senior	F	6' 0" (1.83 m)	185 lb (84 kg)	1998-06-14	Montreal, Quebec	Omaha (NCHC)	—
30	(Latvia)	Gustavs Dāvis Grigals	Graduate	G	6' 1" (1.85 m)	190 lb (86 kg)	1998-07-22	Riga, Latvia	Alaska (NCAA)	—
33	(United States)	Henry Welsch	Junior	G	6' 2" (1.88 m)	195 lb (88 kg)	2000-11-17	Lakeville, Minnesota	Aberdeen Wings (NAHL)	—
77	(United States)	Gabe Blanchard	Sophomore	D	6' 0" (1.83 m)	195 lb (88 kg)	2000-09-15	East Aurora, New York	Sioux City Musketeers (USHL)	—

== Standings ==
2022–23 Hockey East Standings
	Conference record										Overall record					
	GP	W	L	T	OTW	OTL	SW	PTS	GF	GA	GP	W	L	T	GF	GA
#4 Boston University †*	24	18	6	0	2	2	0	54	99	62	40	29	11	0	154	106
#14 Merrimack	24	16	8	0	2	4	0	50	72	52	38	23	14	1	106	89
#16 Northeastern	24	14	7	3	0	2	2	49	78	45	35	17	13	5	107	82
Connecticut	24	13	9	2	4	2	2	41	78	71	35	20	12	3	113	96
Massachusetts Lowell	24	11	10	3	2	2	3	39	56	54	36	18	15	3	89	82
Maine	24	9	11	4	1	1	1	32	62	65	36	15	16	5	92	94
Providence	24	9	9	6	3	0	2	32	64	60	37	16	14	7	103	87
Boston College	24	8	11	5	0	0	1	30	70	73	36	14	16	6	104	104
Massachusetts	24	7	14	3	1	3	2	28	55	80	35	13	17	5	94	103
New Hampshire	24	6	15	3	2	2	2	23	44	76	35	11	20	3	74	105
Vermont	24	5	16	3	2	1	1	18	36	76	36	11	20	5	69	103
Championship: March 18, 2023 † indicates regular season champion * indicates conference tournament champion (Lamoriello Trophy); Rankings: USCHO.com Top 20 Poll

== Schedule and results ==
Date	Time	Opponent^{#}	Rank^{#}	Site	TV	Decision	Result	Attendance	Record
Regular Season
October 1	6:05 PM	St. Lawrence*	#17	Tsongas Center • Lowell, Massachusetts	ESPN+	Grigals	W 4–0	5,580	1–0–0
October 7	7:15 PM	Miami*	#15	Tsongas Center • Lowell, Massachusetts	ESPN+	Welsch	L 1–3	4,225	1–1–0
October 8	6:05 PM	Miami*	#15	Tsongas Center • Lowell, Massachusetts	ESPN+	Grigals	W 4–2	3,593	2–1–0
October 13	7:00 PM	at Michigan State*	#16	Munn Ice Arena • East Lansing, Michigan	BTN+	Grigals	L 3–4	4,419	2–2–0
October 14	7:30 PM	at Michigan State*	#16	Munn Ice Arena • East Lansing, Michigan	BTN+	Welsch	W 3–2	5,133	3–2–0
October 22	7:00 PM	at #12 Northeastern	#19	Matthews Arena • Boston, Massachusetts	NESN, ESPN+	Welsch	W 3–2	2,387	4–2–0 (1–0–0)
October 28	7:15 PM	#9 Boston University	#18	Tsongas Center • Lowell, Massachusetts	ESPN+	Welsch	W 2–1	5,040	5–2–0 (2–0–0)
October 29	7:00 PM	at #9 Boston University	#18	Agganis Arena • Boston, Massachusetts	ESPN+	Grigals	L 1–2 ^{OT}	3,119	5–3–0 (2–1–0)
November 4	7:15 PM	Vermont	#17	Tsongas Center • Lowell, Massachusetts	ESPN+	Welsch	W 4–0	4,152	6–3–0 (3–1–0)
November 5	6:05 PM	Vermont	#17	Tsongas Center • Lowell, Massachusetts	ESPN+	Welsch	W 2–0	4,390	7–3–0 (4–1–0)
November 15	7:00 PM	at Boston College	#13	Conte Forum • Chestnut Hill, Massachusetts	ESPN+	Welsch	L 2–3	3,002	7–4–0 (4–2–0)
November 18	7:15 PM	#7 Connecticut	#13	Tsongas Center • Lowell, Massachusetts	ESPN+	Grigals	W 3–2 ^{OT}	4,806	8–4–0 (5–2–0)
November 19	3:35 PM	at #7 Connecticut	#13	XL Center • Hartford, Connecticut	ESPN+	Welsch	L 2–4	3,665	8–5–0 (5–3–0)
Friendship Four
November 25	2:00 PM	vs. #17 Massachusetts*	#14	SSE Arena Belfast • Belfast, Northern Ireland (Friendship Four Semifinal)		Grigals	L 1–2	5,487	8–6–0
November 26	10:00 AM	vs. Dartmouth*	#14	SSE Arena Belfast • Belfast, Northern Ireland (Friendship Four Consolation Game)		Grigals	W 4–3	5,513	9–6–0
Regular Season
December 3	7:00 PM	at #15 Massachusetts	#16	Mullins Center • Amherst, Massachusetts	ESPN+	Grigals	T 1–1 ^{SOW}	5,579	9–6–1 (5–3–1)
December 9	7:00 PM	at Dartmouth*	#14	Thompson Arena • Hanover, New Hampshire	ESPN+	Grigals	W 3–2	1,511	10–6–1
December 30	6:05 PM	Alaska Anchorage*	#13	Tsongas Center • Lowell, Massachusetts	ESPN+	Welsch	L 2–4	4,483	10–7–1
December 31	4:05 PM	Alaska Anchorage*	#13	Tsongas Center • Lowell, Massachusetts	ESPN+	Grigals	L 2–3	3,543	10–8–1
January 7	1:05 PM	at American International*	#17	MassMutual Center • Springfield, Massachusetts	FloHockey	Grigals	W 4–2	449	11–8–1
January 13	7:00 PM	at Maine	#16	Alfond Arena • Orono, Maine	ESPN+	Grigals	W 2–1	3,150	12–8–1 (6–3–1)
January 14	7:00 PM	at Maine	#16	Alfond Arena • Orono, Maine	ESPN+	Grigals	L 3–5	4,039	12–9–1 (6–4–1)
January 20	7:15 PM	New Hampshire	#19	Tsongas Center • Lowell, Massachusetts	ESPN+	Grigals	W 6–2	6,016	13–9–1 (7–4–1)
January 21	7:00 PM	at New Hampshire	#19	Whittemore Center • Durham, New Hampshire	ESPN+	Welsch	W 3–2	4,237	14–9–1 (8–4–1)
January 27	7:15 PM	Massachusetts	#18	Tsongas Center • Lowell, Massachusetts	ESPN+	Grigals	W 1–0	6,339	15–9–1 (9–4–1)
February 3	7:15 PM	Boston College	#16	Tsongas Center • Lowell, Massachusetts	ESPN+	Grigals	T 2–2 ^{SOW}	-	15–9–2 (9–4–2)
February 4	6:05 PM	New Hampshire	#16	Tsongas Center • Lowell, Massachusetts	ESPN+	Grigals	L 4–5	5,252	15–10–2 (9–5–2)
February 12	2:05 PM	Maine	#17	Tsongas Center • Lowell, Massachusetts	ESPN+	Welsch	T 1–1 ^{SOW}	4,019	15–10–3 (9–5–3)
February 17	7:00 PM	at Providence	#18	Schneider Arena • Providence, Rhode Island	ESPN+	Welsch	L 2–3 ^{OT}	2,626	15–11–3 (9–6–3)
February 18	6:05 PM	Providence	#18	Tsongas Center • Lowell, Massachusetts	ESPN+	Grigals	W 2–1	4,675	16–11–3 (10–6–3)
February 24	7:15 PM	#17 Merrimack	#19	Tsongas Center • Lowell, Massachusetts	NESN, ESPN+	Grigals	L 3–5	5,025	16–12–3 (10–7–3)
February 25	7:00 PM	at #17 Merrimack	#19	J. Thom Lawler Rink • North Andover, Massachusetts	ESPN+	Welsch	L 0–2	5,025	16–13–3 (10–8–3)
March 3	7:15 PM	#15 Northeastern		Tsongas Center • Lowell, Massachusetts	ESPN+	Grigals	W 3–1	5,394	17–13–3 (11–8–3)
March 4	7:00 PM	at #15 Northeastern		Matthews Arena • Boston, Massachusetts	NESN, ESPN+	Grigals	L 3–7	2,539	17–14–3 (11–9–3)
Hockey East Tournament
March 11	4:00 PM	at #19 Connecticut*		Toscano Family Ice Forum • Storrs, Connecticut (Quarterfinal)	NESN+, ESPN+	Grigals	W 2–1	2,691	18–14–3
March 11	7:30 PM	vs. #14 Merrimack*	#20	TD Garden • Boston, Massachusetts (Semifinal)	NESN, ESPN+	Grigals	L 1–2 ^{2OT}	13,187	18–15–3
*Non-conference game. ^{#}Rankings from USCHO.com Poll. All times are in Eastern Time. Source:

== Scoring statistics ==
Name	Position	Games	Goals	Assists	Points	PIM
Carl Berglund	C	36	12	15	27	12
Jonathan McDonald	D	35	3	17	20	14
Brian Chambers	RW	28	8	11	19	12
Isac Jonsson	D	34	5	12	17	6
Ben Meehan	D	34	4	13	17	43
Zach Kaiser	C/LW	30	8	8	16	10
Scout Truman	LW	34	8	6	14	10
Owen Cole	C	33	6	8	14	6
Jake Stella	LW	36	4	9	13	4
Filip Fornåå Svensson	C/RW	28	6	6	12	12
Owen Fowler	LW	33	5	7	12	18
Matthew Crasa	C/RW	31	2	8	10	16
Ryan Brushett	C	24	1	9	10	12
Marek Korenčík	D	36	3	5	8	32
Dillan Bentley	F	22	2	3	5	4
Gabriel Blanchard	D	34	2	3	5	29
Brehdan Engum	D	36	1	4	5	14
Nick Rhéaume	C/LW	27	3	1	4	2
Blake Wells	F	22	2	1	3	6
Mitchell Becker	D	21	1	2	3	8
Stefan Owens	F	26	2	0	2	2
T. J. Schweighardt	D	18	1	1	2	2
Jack Collins	F	12	0	1	1	19
Edvard Nordlund	G	1	0	0	0	0
Mark Cooper	D	2	0	0	0	0
Nik Armstrong-Kingkade	F	0	0	0	0	
Henry Welsch	G	16	0	0	0	0
Gustavs Dāvis Grigals	G	24	0	0	0	0
Total			89	150	239	281

== Goaltending statistics ==
Name	Games	Minutes	Wins	Losses	Ties	Goals against	Saves	Shut outs	SV %	GAA
Gustavs Dāvis Grigals	24	1406:28	12	9	2	48	586	2	.924	2.05
Henry Welsch	16	774:07	6	6	1	29	318	2	.916	2.25
Edvard Nordlund	1	20:00	0	0	0	2	4	0	.667	6.00
Empty Net	-	20:14	-	-	-	3	-	-	-	-
Total	36	2220:49	18	15	3	82	908	4	.917	2.22

== Rankings ==
Poll	Week																											
Poll	Pre	1	2	3	4	5	6	7	8	9	10	11	12	13	14	15	16	17	18	19	20	21	22	23	24	25	26	27 (Final)
USCHO.com	17	-	15	16	19	18	17	16	13	14	16	14	13	-	17	16	19	18	16	17	18	19	NR	NR	20	NR	-	NR
USA Today	16	16	15	16	20	18	17	16	14	13	16	15	13	13	19	20	20	19	15	20	19	20	NR	NR	NR	NR	NR	NR

Note: USCHO did not release a poll in weeks 1, 13, or 26.

== Awards and honors ==
Player	Award	Ref
Gustavs Dāvis Grigals	Hockey East Third Team	
Jon McDonald	Hockey East Third Team	
