= Justin Hryckowian =

Canadian ice hockey player (born 2001)

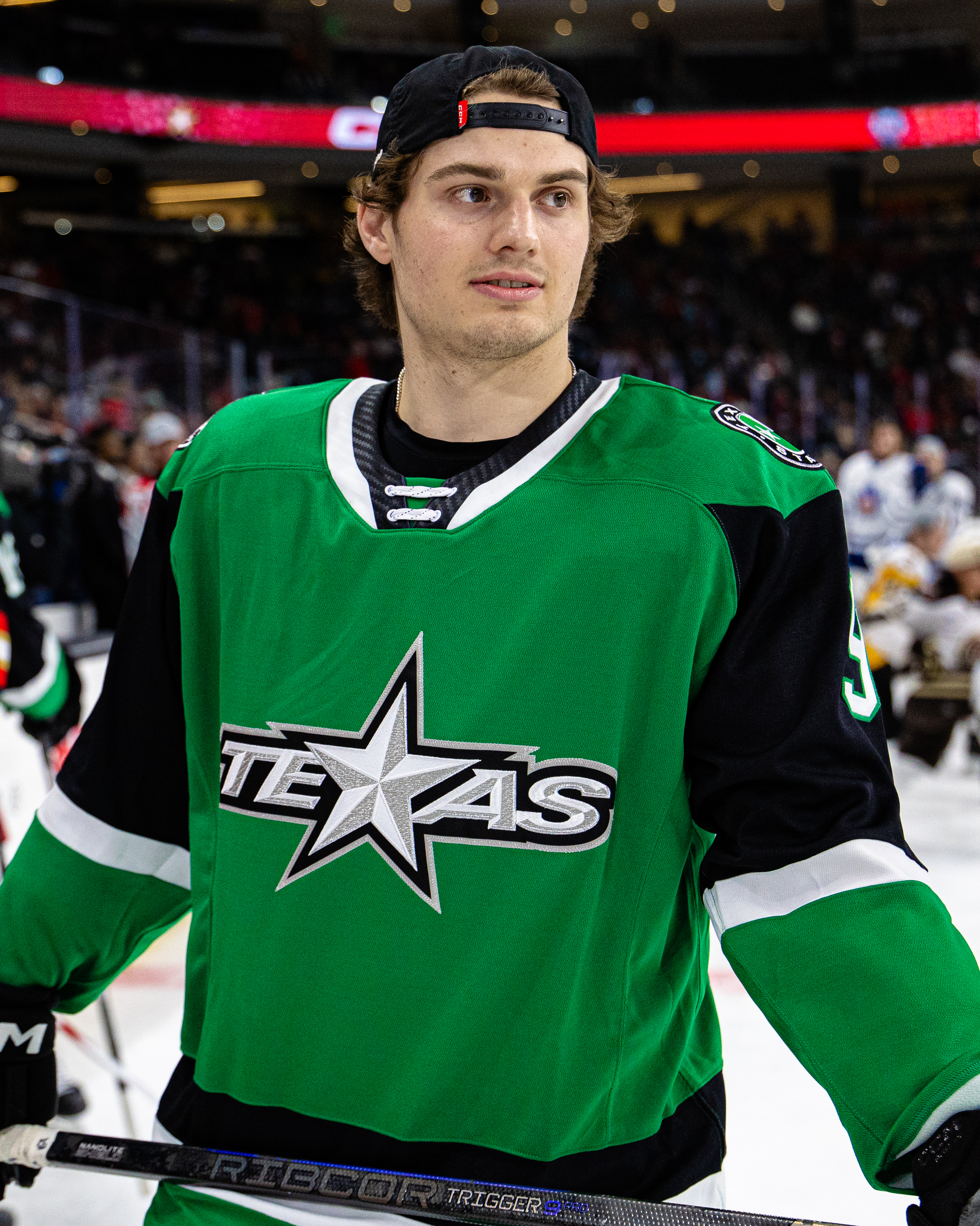
- Hryckowian with the Texas Stars in 2025
- Born: February 23, 2001 (age 25) L'Île-Bizard, Quebec, Canada
- Height: 5 ft 11 in (180 cm)
- Weight: 198 lb (90 kg; 14 st 2 lb)
- Position: Forward
- Shoots: Left
- NHL team: Dallas Stars
- NHL draft: Undrafted
- Playing career: 2024–present

Justin Hryckowian (born February 23, 2001) is a Canadian professional ice hockey player who is a forward for the Dallas Stars of the National Hockey League (NHL). He previously played college ice hockey with the Northeastern Huskies.

== Early life ==
Hryckowian was born February 23, 2001, in L'Île-Bizard, Quebec, to Wojtek Hryckowian and Tina Dandurand. He began playing ice hockey at the age of two, practicing with his brother Dylan on outdoor ice rinks. He played minor ice hockey with the Lac St-Louis Lions of the Quebec Midget AAA Hockey League, recording 34 goals and 75 points in 40 games during the 2017–18 season. For his performance, Hryckowian was awarded the Outstanding Player Award, the Sylvain Turgeon/CCM award as the league's leading scorer, and the Patrice Bergeron Trophy for the most gentlemanly player.

Rather than continuing onto the Quebec Major Junior Hockey League, Hryckowian opted to continue his career in the United States. He spent one year attending the Salisbury School before joining the Cedar Rapids RoughRiders of the United States Hockey League (USHL). When the August 2020 Midwest derecho caused severe damage to ImOn Ice Arena in Cedar Rapids, Hryckowian was dispersed to the Sioux City Musketeers for the 2020–21 USHL season. After recording four goals and 14 points in 17 games for Cedar Rapids, Hryckowian had a break-out season as the Musketeers' captain, scoring 17 goals and finishing with 38 points in 44 games.

== Playing career ==
=== College ===
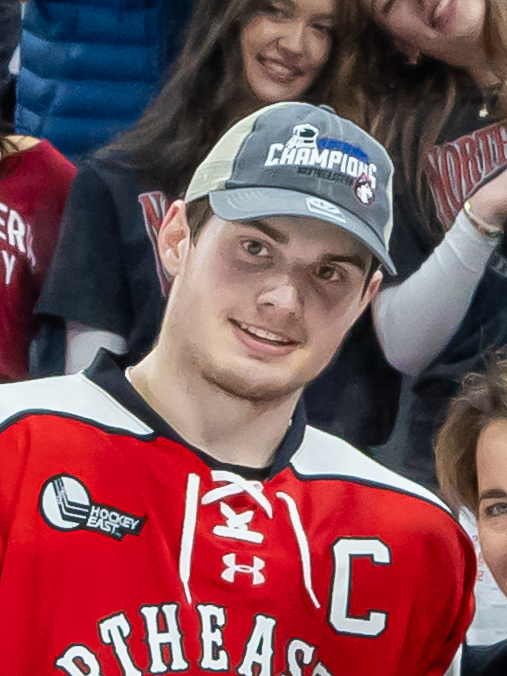
Hryckowian with the Huskies in 2024

Hryckowian joined the Northeastern Huskies for the 2021–22 season. He scored his first college ice hockey goal on October 26, in a 5–3 loss to the UConn Huskies. Appearing in 24 games during his rookie season, Hryckowian led all Northeastern freshmen with six goals and 20 points, and he was named to the Hockey East All-Rookie Team.

The next season, Hryckowian scored his first hat-trick, with three goals and four points in a 6–2 victory over the New Hampshire Wildcats on November 4. He was named the Hockey East Player of the Month for November after notching six goals and 13 points in seven games, including three game-winning goals. A 2023 Hobey Baker Award nominee, Hryckowian finished the 2022–23 season with 14 goals and 29 points, receiving Hockey East Best Defensive Forward and All-Hockey East Second Team honours.

Going into the 2023–24 season, Hryckowian was named captain of the Huskies. On February 12, he was named Hockey East Player of the Week for his three-point game against the Harvard Crimson in the Beanpot semifinals. Hryckowian recorded his 100th career point with an assist on his brother's goal in the Hockey East quarterfinals on March 16. Northeastern lost the game 4–2 to the Boston University Terriers. With 13 goals and 42 points in 32 games played, Hryckowian was once again named the Hockey East Best Defensive Forward and was a Third Team All-Star. He finished his three-season college career with 35 goals and 101 points in 94 games for Northeastern.

=== Professional ===
On March 20, 2024, the Dallas Stars of the National Hockey League (NHL) signed Hryckowian to a two-year entry-level contract, beginning for the 2024–25 season. He spent the remainder of the 2023–24 season with the Texas Stars, Dallas's American Hockey League (AHL) affiliate, on an amateur tryout contract. In 12 regular season games, Hryckowian had one goal and three points, and he added an additional two goals and four points in seven postseason games.

Hryckowian opened the 2024–25 season with the Texas Stars, leading all AHL rookies with 26 points in his first 27 games, including 12 goals. With Mason Marchment placed on the injured reserve, Hryckowian was called up to Dallas to make his NHL debut on December 30, 2024. Playing on the fourth line with Colin Blackwell and Sam Steel, Hryckowian played six minutes in Dallas's 5–1 win over the Chicago Blackhawks. He ultimately appeared in five Dallas games that season, and registered his first NHL point on January 20, 2025, assisting on a goal by Matěj Blümel. Spending the bulk of the season in the AHL, Hryckowian led all rookies in scoring with 60 points in 67 games. He received the Dudley "Red" Garrett Memorial Award as AHL rookie of the year, and was also named to the 2024–25 AHL All-Rookie Team.

With Jamie Benn and Oskar Bäck both injured, Hryckowian was named to the Dallas Stars' opening-night roster for the 2025–26 season. He scored his first NHL goal on November 2, in a 4–3 shootout loss to the Florida Panthers. Continued injuries kept Hryckowian in the lineup, and by the end of December, he was playing on a line with Benn and Matt Duchene. Hryckowian signed a two-year, $1.9 million extension with the Stars on January 7, 2026.

== Personal life ==
Hryckowian's younger brother Dylan is also an ice hockey player. He signed with the Dallas Stars in 2026 after playing three seasons at Northeastern.

== Career statistics ==
			Regular season					Playoffs
Season	Team	League	GP	G	A	Pts	PIM	GP	G	A	Pts	PIM
2019–20	Cedar Rapids RoughRiders	USHL	17	4	10	14	19	—	—	—	—	—
2020–21	Sioux City Musketeers	USHL	44	17	21	38	36	4	1	0	1	0
2021–22	Northeastern Huskies	HE	27	7	15	22	14	—	—	—	—	—
2022–23	Northeastern Huskies	HE	35	15	21	36	26	—	—	—	—	—
2023–24	Northeastern Huskies	HE	32	13	30	43	8	—	—	—	—	—
2023–24	Texas Stars	AHL	12	1	2	3	18	7	2	2	4	2
2024–25	Texas Stars	AHL	67	22	38	60	27	14	9	9	18	10
2024–25	Dallas Stars	NHL	5	0	1	1	0	—	—	—	—	—
2025–26	Dallas Stars	NHL	81	14	16	30	43	6	0	1	1	0
NHL totals			86	14	17	31	43	6	0	1	1	0

== Awards and honours ==
Award	Year(s)	Ref.
College
Hockey East All-Rookie Team	2022	
All-Hockey East Second Team	2023	
Hockey East Best Defensive Forward	2023, 2024	
All-Hockey East Third Team	2024	
AHL
All-Rookie Team	2025	
Dudley "Red" Garrett Memorial Award	2025	
