= Alex Jefferies =

American ice hockey player (born 2001)

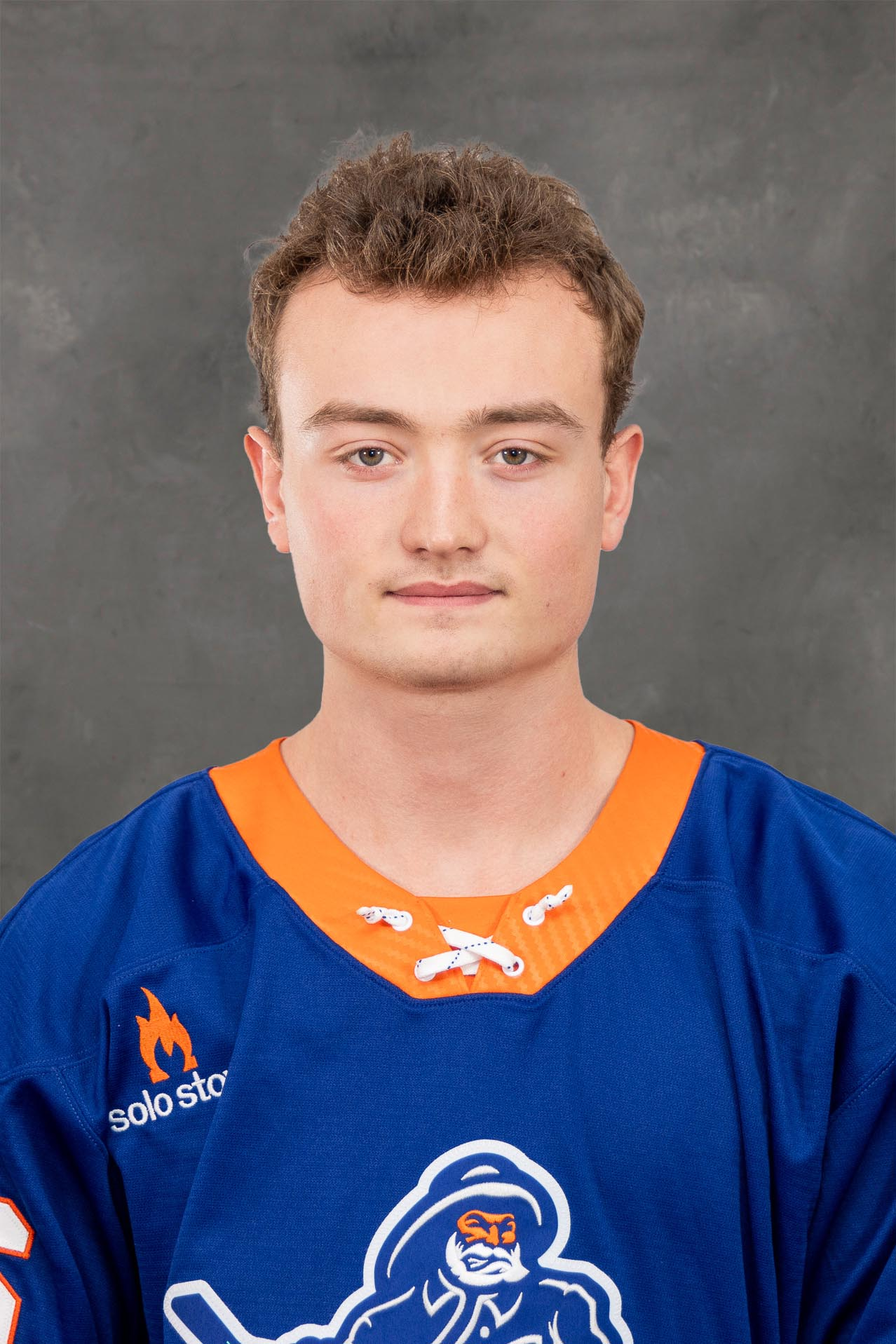
- Jefferies in 2024
- Born: November 8, 2001 (age 24) Framingham, Massachusetts, USA
- Height: 6 ft 0 in (183 cm)
- Weight: 192 lb (87 kg; 13 st 10 lb)
- Position: Left Wing
- Shoots: Right
- NHL team (P) Cur. team: New York Islanders; Hamilton Hammers (AHL)
- NHL draft: 121st overall, 2020; New York Islanders
- Playing career: 2024–present

Alex Jefferies (born November 8, 2001) is an American professional ice hockey left winger currently playing for the Hamilton Hammers in the American Hockey League (AHL) as a prospect to the New York Islanders of the National Hockey League (NHL). He was an All-American for the Merrimack Warriors in 2023.

== Playing career ==
A native of Lunenburg, Jefferies played his early junior career with the local Islanders Hockey Club before he began attending The Gunnery in 2018. He led the prep team in scoring two years in a row and was able to earn a scholarship to Merrimack as an 18 year old. His freshman year he would be named to the Hockey East All-Rookie. Team Despite the end of the 2020 season being cancelled due to the coronavirus pandemic, the New York Islanders had seen enough from Jefferies to select him in the 4th round of the NHL draft.

During the abbreviated Covid season, Jefferies played sparingly. While he only appeared in 12 games with the Warriors, he still was nearly a point per game player and finished 3rd on the team in scoring. His production slumped a bit during his sophomore season and though he did help the team post a winning record, the Warriors ended the year as a pedestrian club. It wasn't until his junior season that Jefferies began to demonstrate the talent that he had possessed before the pandemic. While nearly doubling his point total from the previous season, Jefferies led the Merrimack offense with 41 points and was a major reason for the program reaching the NCAA tournament for just the second time at the D-I level. While their stay wasn't long, the stellar season earned Jefferies a spot on the All-American team and had Islander fans salivating over the prospect of him in a New York jersey. Those hopes would have to wait, as Jefferies announced that he was returning to Merrimack for his senior season.

== Career statistics ==
			Regular season					Playoffs
Season	Team	League	GP	G	A	Pts	PIM	GP	G	A	Pts	PIM
2018–19	The Gunnery	USHS-Prep	31	27	30	57	—	—	—	—	—	—
2018–19	Dubuque Fighting Saints	USHL	2	0	0	0	0	—	—	—	—	—
2019–20	The Gunnery	USHS-Prep	32	33	36	69	—	—	—	—	—	—
2020–21	Merrimack College	HE	12	4	6	10	2	—	—	—	—	—
2021–22	Merrimack College	HE	33	10	13	23	10	—	—	—	—	—
2022–23	Merrimack College	HE	38	14	27	41	16	—	—	—	—	—
2023–24	Merrimack College	HE	22	13	10	23	19	—	—	—	—	—
2023–24	Bridgeport Islanders	AHL	12	4	3	7	0	—	—	—	—	—
2024–25	Bridgeport Islanders	AHL	59	13	16	29	18	—	—	—	—	—
2025–26	Bridgeport Islanders	AHL	60	9	20	29	46	2	0	0	0	0
AHL totals			131	26	39	65	64	2	0	0	0	0

== Awards and honors ==
Award	Year	Ref
College
Hockey East All-Rookie Team	2020–21	
All-Hockey East First Team	2022–23	
AHCA East Second Team All-American	2022–23	
