= Hugo Ollas =

Swedish ice hockey player (born 2002)

- Born: 24 April 2002 (age 24) Linköping, Sweden
- Height: 6 ft 8 in (203 cm)
- Weight: 238 lb (108 kg; 17 st 0 lb)
- Position: Goaltender
- Catches: Left
- Allsv team Former teams: Nybro Vikings IF; Linköping HC
- NHL draft: 197th overall, 2020; New York Rangers
- Playing career: 2021–present

Hugo Ollas (born 24 April 2002) is a Swedish professional ice hockey player who is a goaltender for Nybro Vikings IF of the HockeyAllsvenskan. He played in two games for Linköping HC of the Swedish Hockey League (SHL) in the 2020–21 season. Ollas was drafted by the New York Rangers in the seventh round, 197th overall, of the 2020 NHL entry draft.

At 6 feet 8 inches (2.03 metres) tall, Ollas is larger than most goaltenders. Going into the 2020 draft, he was taller than any goaltender playing in the NHL. He was considered by The Hockey Writers to be "a rough goalie prospect with an incredibly high ceiling. The Hockey News writer Stan Fischler acknowledged that is size is an asset but expressed concern about his mobility.

== Playing career ==
Ollas would play three years at Merrimack college. He would go 10-6 his freshman year and being named the teams rookie of the year. uring his sophomore year he was named the Hockey East goaltender of the month for November 2022, after posting 96 saves for a .960 saves percentage for the Merrimack Warriors. He would also be named a Hockey East Third Team All-Star.On top of this Ollas had have 5 shutouts that year setting the program record for most in a season. As well as helping lead Merrimack to the NCAA tournament for the first time in a decade. He would finish his time at Merrimack with a 27–27 record.

In March 2024, Ollas signed a two-year contract with the Rangers. Ollas made his North American professional debut for the Hartford Wolf Pack of the American Hockey League (AHL) on 20 April 2024, in a 6–4 win against the Springfield Thunderbirds. Ollas would play for the Worcester Railers during the 2024-25 season playing in 22 games going 10-9-2 overall. He would be given the team's performance of the year award at the end of the season for his 31 save debut win vs reading.

Ollas spent most of the 2025-2025 season with the Bloomington Bison of the ECHL. He was briefly called up to the Rangers during the 2026 Olympic break, but was demoted to Bloomington when the Olympic break ended. This was done because the Rangers were required to have two healthy goalies on their roster during the break, and their starting goalie Igor Shesterkin was injured at the time, but they wanted their goalies at Hartford to remain active. Ollas was promoted to Hartford at the end of the season.

At the conclusion of his entry-level contract with the Rangers, having been unable to establish himself within the organization, Ollas returned to Sweden as a pending restricted free agent and was signed to a one-year contract with second-tier club, Nybro Vikings IF of the Allsvenskan, on 30 April 2026.

== Career statistics ==
| Season | Team | Lge | GP | A | PIM | Min | GA | EN | SO | GAA | W | L | T | Svs | Pct | GP | A | PIM |
|---|---|---|---|---|---|---|---|---|---|---|---|---|---|---|---|---|---|---|
| 2018-19 | Linkoping HC Jr. | Swe-Jr | 1 | 0 | 0 | | | | | | | | | | | | | |
| 2019-20 | Linkoping HC Jr. | Swe-Jr | 20 | 1 | 2 | 1088 | 44 | 0 | 0 | 2.43 | 11 | 8 | 0 | 375 | 0.895 | | | |
| 2020-21 | Linkoping HC Jr. | Swe-Jr | 9 | 1 | 0 | 545 | 20 | 0 | 0 | 2.20 | 7 | 2 | 0 | 192 | 0.906 | | | |
| 2020-21 | Linkopings HC | SweHL | 2 | 0 | 0 | 90 | 3 | 0 | 0 | 1.99 | 0 | 1 | 0 | 28 | 0.903 | - | - | - |
| 2020-21 | Bofors IK | Swe-1 | 5 | 0 | 0 | | | | | | | | | | | | | |
| 2021-22 | Merrimack College | H-East | 18 | 0 | 0 | 964 | 36 | 0 | 1 | 2.24 | 10 | 6 | 0 | 414 | 0.920 | | | |
| 2022-23 | Merrimack College | H-East | 22 | 1 | 0 | 1192 | 46 | 0 | 5 | 2.32 | 10 | 9 | 0 | 497 | 0.915 | | | |
| 2023-24 | Merrimack College | H-East | 22 | 0 | 2 | 1163 | 55 | 0 | 0 | 2.84 | 7 | 12 | 0 | 540 | 0.908 | | | |
| 2023-24 | Hartford Wolf Pack | AHL | 1 | 0 | 0 | 60 | 4 | 0 | 0 | 4.00 | 1 | 0 | 0 | 14 | 0.778 | - | - | - |
| 2024-25 | Bloomington Bison | ECHL | 11 | 1 | 0 | 528 | 28 | 0 | 0 | 3.18 | 2 | 7 | 1 | 223 | 0.888 | | | |
| 2024-25 | Worcester Railers | ECHL | 22 | 1 | 4 | 1231 | 65 | 2 | 0 | 3.17 | 10 | 9 | 2 | 558 | 0.896 | | | |
| 2025-26 | Bloomington Bison | ECHL | 18 | 1 | 0 | 838 | 42 | 3 | 0 | 3.01 | 5 | 4 | 1 | 360 | 0.896 | | | |

== Awards and honours ==
| Award | Date |
College
| Merrimack Rookie of the year | 2021–22 |
| Hockey East goaltender of the month | November 2022 |
| Hockey East Third Team All-Star | 2022–23 |
