= List of NCAA ice hockey programs =

Main logo used by the NCAA in Divisions I, II, and III.

This is a list of current and former varsity ice hockey programs that played under NCAA guidelines and/or predated the NCAA's oversight of ice hockey.

== Current teams ==
Time in the NAIA is included for any team so long as they played at the varsity level.
as of July 1, 2026.

=== Division I ===
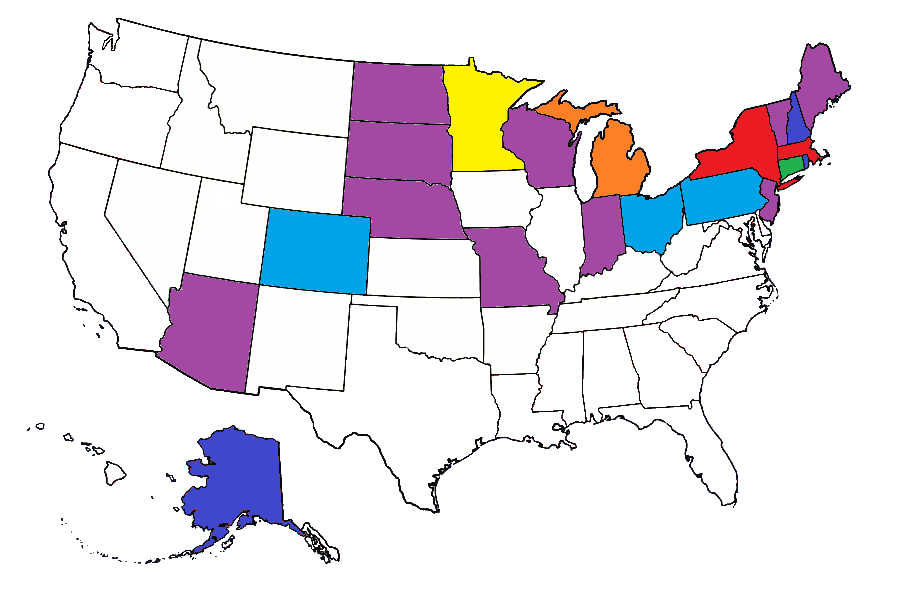
Distribution of teams by state (2023) 1; 2; 3; 4; 6; 7; 11

==== Men's ====
Institution	Location	Nickname	First season	Number of seasons	Conference
Yale University	New Haven, Connecticut	Bulldogs	1895–96	130	ECAC Hockey
Harvard University	Cambridge, Massachusetts	Crimson	1897–98	125	ECAC Hockey
Princeton University	Princeton, New Jersey	Tigers	1899–1900	123	ECAC Hockey
United States Military Academy	West Point, New York	Black Knights	1903–04	123	AHA
Dartmouth College	Hanover, New Hampshire	Big Green	1905–06	119	ECAC Hockey
Cornell University	Ithaca, New York	Big Red	1899–1900	109	ECAC Hockey
Rensselaer Polytechnic Institute	Troy, New York	Engineers	1901–02	106	ECAC Hockey
Michigan Technological University	Houghton, Michigan	Huskies	1919–20	105	CCHA
University of Minnesota	Minneapolis, Minnesota	Golden Gophers	1921–22	105	Big Ten
Clarkson University	Potsdam, New York	Golden Knights	1920–21	104	ECAC Hockey
University of Michigan	Ann Arbor, Michigan	Wolverines	1922–23	104	Big Ten
Boston College	Chestnut Hill, Massachusetts	Eagles	1917–18	102	Hockey East
University of St. Thomas	Saint Paul, Minnesota	Tommies	1920–21	102	CCHA
University of New Hampshire	Durham, New Hampshire	Wildcats	1922–23	100	Hockey East
Brown University	Providence, Rhode Island	Bears	1897–98	99	ECAC Hockey
Boston University	Boston, Massachusetts	Terriers	1917–18	98	Hockey East
Colgate University	Hamilton, New York	Raiders	1915–16	96	ECAC Hockey
University of Massachusetts Amherst	Amherst, Massachusetts	Minutemen	1908–09	94	Hockey East
Northeastern University	Boston, Massachusetts	Huskies	1929–30	93	Hockey East
St. Cloud State University	St. Cloud, Minnesota	Huskies	1931–32	91	NCHC
St. Lawrence University	Canton, New York	Saints	1925–26	86	ECAC Hockey
Colorado College	Colorado Springs, Colorado	Tigers	1937–38	86	NCHC
Union College	Schenectady, New York	Garnet Chargers	1903–04	85	ECAC Hockey
Michigan State University	East Lansing, Michigan	Spartans	1921–22	84	Big Ten
University of North Dakota	Grand Forks, North Dakota	Fighting Hawks	1929–30	84	NCHC
University of Minnesota Duluth	Duluth, Minnesota	Bulldogs	1930–31	82	NCHC
University of Wisconsin	Madison, Wisconsin	Badgers	1921–22	77	Big Ten
University of Denver	Denver, Colorado	Pioneers	1949–50	77	NCHC
University of Alaska Fairbanks	Fairbanks, Alaska	Nanooks	1925–26	76	Independent
Providence College	Providence, Rhode Island	Friars	1926–27	75	Hockey East
University of Vermont	Burlington, Vermont	Catamounts	1925–26	70	Hockey East
Bemidji State University	Bemidji, Minnesota	Beavers	1947–48	70	CCHA
Merrimack College	North Andover, Massachusetts	Warriors	1956–57	70	Hockey East
University of Notre Dame	Notre Dame, Indiana	Fighting Irish	1911–12	69	Big Ten
University of Connecticut	Storrs, Connecticut	Huskies	1911–12	67	Hockey East
Ohio State University	Columbus, Ohio	Buckeyes	1963–64	63	Big Ten
Rochester Institute of Technology	Henrietta, New York	Tigers	1964–65	62	AHA
College of the Holy Cross	Worcester, Massachusetts	Crusaders	1913–14	61	AHA
Lake Superior State University	Sault Ste. Marie, Michigan	Lakers	1966–67	60	CCHA
University of Massachusetts Lowell	Lowell, Massachusetts	River Hawks	1967–68	59	Hockey East
United States Air Force Academy	USAF Academy, Colorado	Falcons	1968–69	58	AHA
Bowling Green State University	Bowling Green, Ohio	Falcons	1969–70	57	CCHA
Minnesota State University, Mankato	Mankato, Minnesota	Mavericks	1969–70	57	CCHA
Western Michigan University	Kalamazoo, Michigan	Broncos	1973–74	52	NCHC
University of Maine	Orono, Maine	Black Bears	1922–23	51	Hockey East
Ferris State University	Big Rapids, Michigan	Bulldogs	1975–76	51	CCHA
Quinnipiac University	Hamden, Connecticut	Bobcats	1975–76	51	ECAC Hockey
Northern Michigan University	Marquette, Michigan	Wildcats	1976–77	50	CCHA
Bentley University	Waltham, Massachusetts	Falcons	1977–78	49	AHA
Miami University	Oxford, Ohio	RedHawks	1978–79	48	NCHC
Stonehill College	Easton, Massachusetts	Skyhawks	1978–79	47	Independent
Canisius University	Buffalo, New York	Golden Griffins	1980–81	46	AHA
University of Alaska Anchorage	Anchorage, Alaska	Seawolves	1979–80	45	Independent
Sacred Heart University	Fairfield, Connecticut	Pioneers	1993–94	33	AHA
Niagara University	Lewiston, New York	Purple Eagles	1996–97	30	AHA
University of Nebraska Omaha	Omaha, Nebraska	Mavericks	1997–98	29	NCHC
Pennsylvania State University	University Park, Pennsylvania	Nittany Lions	1909–10	20	Big Ten
Robert Morris University	Moon Township, Pennsylvania	Colonials	2004–05	20	AHA
Arizona State University	Tempe, Arizona	Sun Devils	2015–16	11	NCHC
Long Island University	Brooklyn, New York	Sharks	2020–21	6	Independent
Lindenwood University	St. Charles, Missouri	Lions	2022–23	4	Independent
Augustana University	Sioux Falls, South Dakota	Vikings	2023–24	3	CCHA

==== Women's ====
Institution	Location	Nickname	First season	Number of seasons	Conference
Brown University	Providence, Rhode Island	Bears	1967–68	57	ECAC Hockey
Cornell University	Ithaca, New York	Big Red	1972–73	53	ECAC Hockey
Providence College	Providence, Rhode Island	Friars	1974–75	52	Hockey East
Rochester Institute of Technology	Henrietta, New York	Tigers	1975–76	51	AHA
University of New Hampshire	Durham, New Hampshire	Wildcats	1977–78	49	Hockey East
Dartmouth College	Hanover, New Hampshire	Big Green	1977–78	48	ECAC Hockey
Harvard University	Cambridge, Massachusetts	Crimson	1977–78	48	ECAC Hockey
Yale University	New Haven, Connecticut	Bulldogs	1977–78	48	ECAC Hockey
St. Lawrence University	Canton, New York	Saints	1978–79	48	ECAC Hockey
Princeton University	Princeton, New Jersey	Tigers	1979–80	46	ECAC Hockey
Northeastern University	Boston, Massachusetts	Huskies	1980–81	46	Hockey East
Boston College	Chestnut Hill, Massachusetts	Eagles	1994–95	32	Hockey East
Sacred Heart University	Fairfield, Connecticut	Pioneers	1996–97	30	NEWHA
Rensselaer Polytechnic Institute	Troy, New York	Engineers	1996–97	29	ECAC Hockey
Colgate University	Hamilton, New York	Raiders	1997–98	29	ECAC Hockey
University of Maine	Orono, Maine	Black Bears	1997–98	29	Hockey East
University of Minnesota	Minneapolis, Minnesota	Golden Gophers	1997–98	29	WCHA
Bemidji State University	Bemidji, Minnesota	Beavers	1998–99	28	WCHA
Minnesota State University, Mankato	Mankato, Minnesota	Mavericks	1998–99	28	WCHA
St. Cloud State University	St. Cloud, Minnesota	Huskies	1998–99	28	WCHA
University of St. Thomas	Saint Paul, Minnesota	Tommies	1998–99	28	WCHA
University of Vermont	Burlington, Vermont	Catamounts	1998–99	28	Hockey East
College of the Holy Cross	Worcester, Massachusetts	Crusaders	1999–2000	27	Hockey East
Mercyhurst University	Erie, Pennsylvania	Lakers	1999–2000	27	AHA
University of Minnesota Duluth	Duluth, Minnesota	Bulldogs	1999–2000	27	WCHA
Ohio State University	Columbus, Ohio	Buckeyes	1999–2000	27	WCHA
University of Wisconsin	Madison, Wisconsin	Badgers	1999–2000	27	WCHA
Union College	Schenectady, New York	Garnet Chargers	1999–2000	26	ECAC Hockey
University of Connecticut	Storrs, Connecticut	Huskies	2000–01	26	Hockey East
Saint Michael's College	Colchester, Vermont	Purple Knights	2000–01	25	NEWHA
Quinnipiac University	Hamden, Connecticut	Bobcats	2001–02	25	ECAC Hockey
Clarkson University	Potsdam, New York	Golden Knights	2003–04	23	ECAC Hockey
Saint Anselm College	Goffstown, New Hampshire	Hawks	2004–05	21	NEWHA
Boston University	Boston, Massachusetts	Terriers	2005–06	21	Hockey East
Robert Morris University	Moon Township, Pennsylvania	Colonials	2004–05	20	AHA
Syracuse University	Syracuse, New York	Orange	2008–09	16	AHA
Lindenwood University	St. Charles, Missouri	Lady Lions	2011–12	15	AHA
Pennsylvania State University	University Park, Pennsylvania	Nittany Lions	2012–13	14	AHA
Franklin Pierce University	Rindge, New Hampshire	Ravens	2012–13	14	NEWHA
Merrimack College	North Andover, Massachusetts	Warriors	2015–16	11	Hockey East
Post University	Waterbury, Connecticut	Eagles	2016–17	9	NEWHA
Long Island University	Brooklyn, New York	Sharks	2019–20	7	NEWHA
Stonehill College	Easton, Massachusetts	Skyhawks	2022–23	4	NEWHA
Assumption University (Worcester)	Worcester, Massachusetts	Greyhounds	2023–24	3	NEWHA
University of Delaware	Newark, Delaware	Fightin' Blue Hens	2025–26	1	AHA

=== Division II ===
==== Men's ====
Institution	Location	Nickname	First season	Number of seasons	Conference
American International College	Springfield, Massachusetts	Yellow Jackets	1948–49	78	Northeast-10
Saint Michael's College	Colchester, Vermont	Purple Knights	1922–23	67	Northeast-10
Assumption University (Worcester)	Worcester, Massachusetts	Greyhounds	1918–19	62	Northeast-10
Saint Anselm College	Goffstown, New Hampshire	Hawks	1969–70	56	Northeast-10
Southern New Hampshire University	Manchester, New Hampshire	Penmen	1975–76	50	Northeast-10
Franklin Pierce University	Rindge, New Hampshire	Ravens	2002–03	24	Northeast-10
Post University	Waterbury, Connecticut	Eagles	2016–17	9	Northeast-10

==== Women's ====
No women's ice hockey programs currently play under Division II regulations. The NCAA allows D-II members to play under Division I regulations in any sport that does not have a D-II national championship, and all D-II members that sponsor varsity women's hockey choose to play as D-I.

Of the six schools that play under D-II regulations in men's ice hockey, four currently have women's varsity teams, all of which play in the NEWHA. Assumption started women's varsity play in 2023–24 as a NEWHA member.

=== Division III ===
==== Men's ====
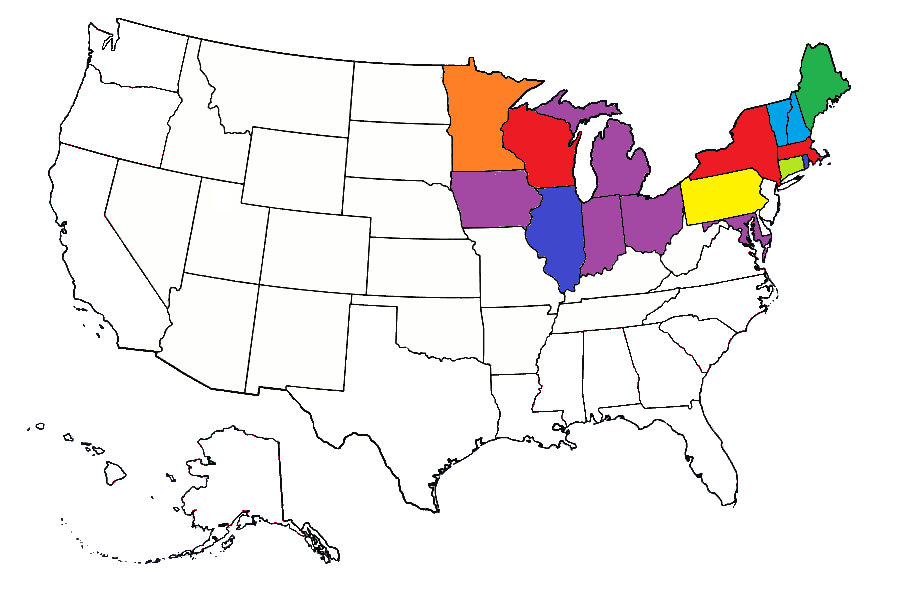
Distribution of teams by state (2025) 1; 2; 3; 4; 5; 8; 9; >10 • Wisconsin (11) • New York (18) • Massachusetts (19)

Institution	Location	Nickname	First season	Number of seasons	Conference
Williams College	Williamstown, Massachusetts	Ephs	1902–03	121	NESCAC
Hamilton College	Clinton, New York	Continentals	1918–19	104	NESCAC
Hamline University	Saint Paul, Minnesota	Pipers	1919–20	103	MIAC
Bowdoin College	Brunswick, Maine	Polar Bears	1919–20	102	NESCAC
Saint John's University	Collegeville, Minnesota	Johnnies	1920–21	102	MIAC
Colby College	Waterville, Maine	Mules	1921–22	101	NESCAC
Middlebury College	Middlebury, Vermont	Panthers	1922–23	100	NESCAC
Augsburg University	Minneapolis, Minnesota	Auggies	1927–28	95	MIAC
Concordia College	Moorhead, Minnesota	Cobbers	1927–28	95	MIAC
Amherst College	Amherst, Massachusetts	Mammoths	1908–09	93	NESCAC
Norwich University	Northfield, Vermont	Cadets	1909–10	92	LEC
Gustavus Adolphus College	St. Peter, Minnesota	Golden Gusties	1936–37	86	MIAC
St. Olaf College	Northfield, Minnesota	Oles	1927–28	85	MIAC
Nichols College	Dudley, Massachusetts	Bison	1938–39	75	CNE
University of Wisconsin–Superior	Superior, Wisconsin	Yellowjackets	1927–28	73	WIAC
Saint Mary's University	Winona, Minnesota	Cardinals	1928–29	73	MIAC
Salem State University	Salem, Massachusetts	Vikings	1961–62	64	MASCAC
University of Massachusetts Boston	Dorchester, Massachusetts	Beacons	1962–63 ^{†}	63 ^{†}	LEC
Trinity College	Hartford, Connecticut	Bantams	1905–06	62	NESCAC
University of Wisconsin–River Falls	River Falls, Wisconsin	Falcons	1964–65	62	WIAC
Tufts University	Medford, Massachusetts	Jumbos	1907–08	61	NESCAC
Babson College	Wellesley, Massachusetts	Beavers	1965–66	61	LEC
Lake Forest College	Lake Forest, Illinois	Foresters	1965–66	61	NCHA
State University of New York at Oswego	Oswego, New York	Lakers	1966–67	59	SUNYAC
Worcester State University	Worcester, Massachusetts	Lancers	1966–67	59	MASCAC
University of Wisconsin–Stout	Stout, Wisconsin	Blue Devils	1968–69	58	WIAC
New England College	Henniker, New Hampshire	Pilgrims	1969–70	56	LEC
Wesleyan University	Middletown, Connecticut	Cardinals	1909–10	55	NESCAC
Fitchburg State University	Fitchburg, Massachusetts	Falcons	1970–71	55	MASCAC
Hobart College	Geneva, New York	Statesmen	1970–71	55	SUNYAC
Plymouth State University	Plymouth, New Hampshire	Panthers	1971–72	55	LEC
Framingham State University	Framingham, Massachusetts	Rams	1971–72	54	MASCAC
The College of St. Scholastica	Duluth, Minnesota	Saints	1972–73	54	MIAC
Suffolk University	Boston, Massachusetts	Rams	1946–47	53	CNE
State University of New York at Brockport	Brockport, New York	Golden Eagles	1973–74	52	UCHC
Curry College	Milton, Massachusetts	Colonels	1974–75	52	CNE
University of Massachusetts Dartmouth	Dartmouth, Massachusetts	Corsairs	1974–75	52	LEC
Elmira College	Elmira, New York	Soaring Eagles	1975–76	51	UCHC
State University of New York at Cortland	Cortland, New York	Red Dragons	1975–76	50	SUNYAC
State University of New York at Geneseo	Geneseo, New York	Ice Knights	1975–76	50	UCHC
State University of New York at Plattsburgh	Plattsburgh, New York	Cardinals	1975–76	50	SUNYAC
University of Wisconsin–Eau Claire	Eau Claire, Wisconsin	Blugolds	1977–78	49	WIAC
University of Southern Maine	Gorham, Maine	Huskies	1972–73	48	LEC
Bethel University	Arden Hills, Minnesota	Royals	1979–80	47	MIAC
State University of New York at Potsdam	Potsdam, New York	Bears	1979–80	46	SUNYAC
Connecticut College	New London, Connecticut	Camels	1980–81	46	NESCAC
Western New England University	Springfield, Massachusetts	Golden Bears	1980–81	45	CNE
University of Wisconsin–Stevens Point	Stevens Point, Wisconsin	Pointers	1981–82	45	WIAC
Skidmore College	Saratoga Springs, New York	Thoroughbreds	1982–83	43	SUNYAC
Lawrence University	Appleton, Wisconsin	Vikings	1986–87	40	NCHA
State University of New York at Fredonia	Fredonia, New York	Blue Devils	1987–88	38	SUNYAC
St. Norbert College	De Pere, Wisconsin	Green Knights	1988–89	37	NCHA
Massachusetts College of Liberal Arts (Note: Previously known as North Adams State College.)	North Adams, Massachusetts	Trailblazers	1971–72	33	MASCAC
Wentworth Institute of Technology	Boston, Massachusetts	Leopards	1992–93	33	CNE
Buffalo State University	Buffalo, New York	Bengals	1993–94	32	SUNYAC
Westfield State University	Westfield, Massachusetts	Owls	1974–75	32	MASCAC
Marian University	Fond du Lac, Wisconsin	Sabres	1995–96	31	NCHA
Johnson & Wales University	Providence, Rhode Island	Wildcats	1997–98	28	CNE
Salve Regina University	Newport, Rhode Island	Seahawks	1997–98	28	NEHC
Neumann University	Aston, Pennsylvania	Knights	1998–99	28	MAC
Manhattanville University	Purchase, New York	Valiants	1999–00	27	UCHC
Milwaukee School of Engineering	Milwaukee, Wisconsin	Raiders	2001–02	25	NCHA
Utica University	Utica, New York	Pioneers	2001–02	25	UCHC
Vermont State University Castleton	Castleton, Vermont	Spartans	2003–04	23	LEC
Lebanon Valley College	Annville, Pennsylvania	Flying Dutchmen	1998–99	22	MAC
State University of New York at Morrisville	Morrisville, New York	Mustangs	2006–07	19	SUNYAC
Adrian College	Adrian, Michigan	Bulldogs	2007–08	19	NCHA
Concordia University Wisconsin	Mequon, Wisconsin	Falcons	2007–08	19	NCHA
University of New England	Biddeford, Maine	Nor'easters	2009–10	17	CNE
Roger Williams University	Bristol, Rhode Island	Hawks	1983–84	16	CNE
Nazareth University	Pittsford, New York	Golden Flyers	2012–13	14	UCHC
State University of New York at Canton	Canton, New York	Kangaroos	2012–13	13	SUNYAC
Aurora University	Aurora, Illinois	Spartans	2014–15	12	NCHA
Endicott College	Beverly, Massachusetts	Gulls	2015–16	11	CNE
Stevenson University	Stevenson, Maryland	Mustangs	2016–17	10	MAC
Chatham University	Pittsburgh, Pennsylvania	Cougars	2017–18	9	UCHC
Trine University	Angola, Indiana	Thunder	2017–18	9	NCHA
King's College	Wilkes-Barre, Pennsylvania	Monarchs	2017–18	9	MAC
Wilkes University	Wilkes-Barre, Pennsylvania	Colonels	2018–19	8	MAC
Albertus Magnus College	New Haven, Connecticut	Falcons	2019–20	7	UCHC
Keene State College	Keene, New Hampshire	Owls	1982–83	5	LEC
Arcadia University	Glenside, Pennsylvania	Knights	2021–22	5	MAC
Rivier University	Nashua, New Hampshire	Raiders	2021–22	5	MASCAC
Alvernia University	Reading, Pennsylvania	Golden Wolves	2022–23	4	MAC
University of Dubuque	Dubuque, Iowa	Spartans	2023–24	3	NCHA
Misericordia University	Dallas, Pennsylvania	Cougars	2024–25	2	MAC
Beloit College	Beloit, Wisconsin	Buccaneers	2025–26	1	WIAC
Hiram College	Hiram, Ohio	Terriers	2025–26	1	Independent
St. John Fisher University	Pittsford, New York	Cardinals	2025–26	1	UCHC
Western Connecticut State University	Danbury, Connecticut	Wolves	2025–26	1	LEC
Albright College	Reading, Pennsylvania	Lions	2026–27	0	MAC
University of Saint Joseph	West Hartford, Connecticut	Blue Jays	2026–27	0	MASCAC

† UMass Boston's program began in 1980, however, the school merged in 1982 with Boston State College, which had started its ice hockey program in 1962.

==== Women's ====
Institution	Location	Nickname	First season	Number of seasons	Conference
Middlebury College	Middlebury, Vermont	Panthers	1981–82	44	NESCAC
Bowdoin College	Brunswick, Maine	Polar Bears	1984–85	41	NESCAC
Williams College	Williamstown, Massachusetts	Ephs	1994–95	31	NESCAC
Augsburg University	Minneapolis, Minnesota	Auggies	1995–96	31	MIAC
Amherst College	Amherst, Massachusetts	Mammoths	1995–96	30	NESCAC
Hamilton College	Clinton, New York	Continentals	1996–97	29	NESCAC
Wesleyan University	Middletown, Connecticut	Cardinals	1996–97	29	NESCAC
Connecticut College	New London, Connecticut	Camels	1997–98	29	NESCAC
Gustavus Adolphus College	St. Peter, Minnesota	Golden Gusties	1997–98	29	MIAC
College of Saint Benedict	St. Joseph, Minnesota	Bennies	1997–98	29	MIAC
Saint Mary's University	Winona, Minnesota	Cardinals	1998–99	28	MIAC
University of Southern Maine	Gorham, Maine	Huskies	1998–99	28	LEC
St. Catherine University	Saint Paul, Minnesota	Wildcats	1998–99	27	MIAC
Trinity College	Hartford, Connecticut	Bantams	1998–99	27	NESCAC
Bethel University	Arden Hills, Minnesota	Royals	1999–00	27	MIAC
Concordia College	Moorhead, Minnesota	Cobbers	1999–00	27	MIAC
Manhattanville University	Purchase, New York	Valiants	1999–00	27	UCHC
University of Wisconsin–River Falls	River Falls, Wisconsin	Falcons	1999–00	27	WIAC
Salve Regina University	Newport, Rhode Island	Seahawks	1999–00	27	CNE
Buffalo State University	Buffalo, New York	Bengals	1999–00	26	SUNYAC
Hamline University	Saint Paul, Minnesota	Pipers	2000–01	26	MIAC
Lake Forest College	Lake Forest, Illinois	Foresters	2000–01	26	NCHA
University of Wisconsin–Eau Claire	Eau Claire, Wisconsin	Blugolds	2000–01	26	WIAC
University of Wisconsin–Stevens Point	Stevens Point, Wisconsin	Pointers	2000–01	26	WIAC
State University of New York at Cortland	Cortland, New York	Red Dragons	2000–01	25	SUNYAC
St. Olaf College	Northfield, Minnesota	Oles	2000–01	25	MIAC
Colby College	Waterville, Maine	Mules	2001–02	25	NESCAC
Elmira College	Elmira, New York	Soaring Eagles	2001–02	25	UCHC
Neumann University	Aston, Pennsylvania	Knights	2001–02	25	UCHC
Utica University	Utica, New York	Pioneers	2001–02	25	UCHC
University of Wisconsin–Superior	Superior, Wisconsin	Yellowjackets	2001–02	25	WIAC
State University of New York at Plattsburgh	Plattsburgh, New York	Cardinals	2001–02	24	SUNYAC
Chatham University	Pittsburgh, Pennsylvania	Cougars	2002–03	24	UCHC
New England College	Henniker, New Hampshire	Pilgrims	2002–03	24	LEC
University of Massachusetts Boston	Dorchester, Massachusetts	Beacons	2003–04	22	LEC
Vermont State University Castleton	Castleton, Vermont	Spartans	2004–05	22	LEC
Plymouth State University	Plymouth, New Hampshire	Panthers	2006–07	20	LEC
State University of New York at Oswego	Oswego, New York	Lakers	2006–07	19	SUNYAC
Adrian College	Adrian, Michigan	Bulldogs	2007–08	19	NCHA
Concordia University Wisconsin	Mequon, Wisconsin	Falcons	2007–08	19	NCHA
Norwich University	Northfield, Vermont	Cadets	2007–08	19	LEC
Nichols College	Dudley, Massachusetts	Bison	2008–09	18	CNE
State University of New York at Potsdam	Potsdam, New York	Bears	2008–09	17	SUNYAC
Marian University	Fond du Lac, Wisconsin	Sabres	2009–10	17	NCHA
The College of St. Scholastica	Duluth, Minnesota	Saints	2010–11	16	MIAC
St. Norbert College	De Pere, Wisconsin	Green Knights	2010–11	15	NCHA
University of New England	Biddeford, Maine	Nor'easters	2012–13	14	CNE
Stevenson University	Stevenson, Maryland	Mustangs	2012–13	14	UCHC
State University of New York at Canton	Canton, New York	Kangaroos	2013–14	12	SUNYAC
William Smith College	Geneva, New York	Herons	2014–15	11	SUNYAC
Endicott College	Beverly, Massachusetts	Gulls	2015–16	11	CNE
Johnson & Wales University	Providence, Rhode Island	Wildcats	2015–16	11	CNE
Salem State University	Salem, Massachusetts	Vikings	2015–16	11	MASCAC
State University of New York at Morrisville	Morrisville, New York	Mustangs	2015–16	10	SUNYAC
Lebanon Valley College	Annville, Pennsylvania	Flying Dutchwomen	2016–17	10	UCHC
Aurora University	Aurora, Illinois	Spartans	2017–18	9	NCHA
Trine University	Angola, Indiana	Thunder	2017–18	9	NCHA
King's College	Wilkes-Barre, Pennsylvania	Monarchs	2017–18	9	UCHC
Nazareth University	Pittsford, New York	Golden Flyers	2018–19	8	UCHC
Suffolk University	Boston, Massachusetts	Rams	2018–19	8	CNE
Wilkes University	Wilkes-Barre, Pennsylvania	Colonels	2018–19	8	UCHC
Alvernia University	Reading, Pennsylvania	Golden Wolves	2019–20	7	UCHC
Arcadia University	Glenside, Pennsylvania	Knights	2021–22	5	UCHC
Curry College	Milton, Massachusetts	Colonels	2021–22	5	CNE
Lawrence University	Appleton, Wisconsin	Vikings	2021–22	5	NCHA
Rivier University	Nashua, New Hampshire	Raiders	2021–22	5	MASCAC
Western New England University	Springfield, Massachusetts	Golden Bears	2021–22	5	CNE
Worcester State University	Worcester, Massachusetts	Lancers	2021–22	5	MASCAC
Hilbert College	Hamburg, New York	Hawks	2022–23	4	UCHC
Albertus Magnus College	New Haven, Connecticut	Falcons	2023–24	3	UCHC
University of Dubuque	Dubuque, Iowa	Spartans	2023–24	3	NCHA
Massachusetts College of Liberal Arts (Note: Previously known as North Adams State College.)	North Adams, Massachusetts	Trailblazers	2023–24	3	MASCAC
Framingham State University	Framingham, Massachusetts	Rams	2024–25	2	MASCAC
Keene State College	Keene, New Hampshire	Owls	2024–25	2	LEC
Milwaukee School of Engineering	Milwaukee, Wisconsin	Raiders	2024–25	2	NCHA
Beloit College	Beloit, Wisconsin	Buccaneers	2025–26	1	WIAC
St. John Fisher University	Pittsford, New York	Cardinals	2025–26	1	UCHC
Hiram College	Hiram, Ohio	Terriers	2026–27	0	Independent
Roger Williams University	Bristol, Rhode Island	Hawks	2026–27	0	CNE
University of Saint Joseph	West Hartford, Connecticut	Blue Jays	2026–27	0	MASCAC
Western Connecticut University	Danbury, Connecticut	Wolves	2026–27	0	LEC

== Future teams ==
=== Division I ===
==== Men's ====
Institution	Location	Nickname	First season	Conference
Maryville University	Saint Louis, Missouri	Saints	2027–28	Independent
Tennessee State University	Nashville, Tennessee	Tigers	2027–28	Independent

=== Division III ===
==== Men's ====
Institution	Location	Nickname	First season	Conference
Saint Anselm College	Goffstown, New Hampshire	Hawks	2027–28	LEC

==== Women's ====
Institution	Location	Nickname	First season	Conference
Fitchburg State University	Fitchburg, Massachusetts	Falcons	2027–28	MASCAC
Saint Anselm College	Goffstown, New Hampshire	Hawks	2027–28	LEC

== Former teams ==
Defunct teams are listed at the level and in the conference they were when they ceased sponsoring ice hockey as a varsity sport. For programs that ended prior to the delineation of college hockey in 1965, all will be listed under Division I classification.

=== Division I ===
==== Men's ====
Institution	Location	Nickname	First season	Last season	Total seasons	Conference
Mercyhurst University	Erie, Pennsylvania	Lakers	1987–88	2025–26	39	AHA
University of Alabama in Huntsville	Huntsville, Alabama	Chargers (Note: Dropped hockey after the 2020–21 season (though officially "suspended") due to inability to find a new conference home after the demise of its former home league of the men's WCHA.)	1985–86	2020–21	36	WCHA
Iona College	New Rochelle, New York	Gaels	1967–68	2002–03	36	MAAC
University of Illinois at Chicago	Chicago, Illinois	Flames	1966–67	1995–96	30	CCHA
Fairfield University	Fairfield, Connecticut	Stags	1974–75	2002–03	29	MAAC
University of Pennsylvania	Philadelphia, Pennsylvania	Quakers	1896–97	1977–78	27	ECAC Hockey
Springfield College	Springfield, Massachusetts	Maroons	1904–05	1941–42	27	Independent
Columbia University	New York, New York	Lions	1896–97	1937–38	23	Independent
University of California, Berkeley	Berkeley, California	Golden Bears	1928–29	1948–49	19	Independent
University of Southern California	Los Angeles, California	Trojans	1924–25	1941–42	18	PCC
Bates College	Lewiston, Maine	Bobcats	1919–20	1934–35	16	Independent
University of California, Los Angeles	Los Angeles, California	Bruins	1926–27	1940–41	15	PCC
Kent State University	Kent, Ohio	Golden Flashes	1980–81	1993–94	13	CCHA
Loyola University of Los Angeles (Note: Merged with Marymount College in 1973 to form the current Loyola Marymount University.)	Westchester, California	Lions	1928–29	1940–41	13	PCC
Marquette University	Milwaukee, Wisconsin	Hilltoppers	1922–23	1932–33	11	Independent
University of Pittsburgh	Pittsburgh, Pennsylvania	Panthers	1896–97	1938–39	10	Penn-Ohio League
Wayne State University	Detroit, Michigan	Warriors	1999–2000	2007–08	9	CHA
United States International University	San Diego, California	Gulls	1979–80	1987–88	9	GWHC
Saint Louis University	St. Louis, Missouri	Billikens	1970–71	1978–79	9	CCHA
North Dakota State University	Fargo, North Dakota	Bison	1925–26	1950–51	9	Independent
Syracuse University	Syracuse, New York	Orangemen	1911–12	1939–40	9	Independent
University of Findlay	Findlay, Ohio	Oilers	1996–97	2003–04	8	CHA
Carnegie Tech (Note: At the time the university was the separate Carnegie Institute of Technology, which merged with the Mellon Institute of Technology in 1967 to form the current Carnegie Mellon University.)	Pittsburgh, Pennsylvania	Tartans	1905–06	1939–40	8	Penn-Ohio League
Georgetown University	Washington, D.C.	Hoyas	1939–40	1948–49	6	Independent
University of Illinois at Urbana–Champaign	Urbana, Illinois	Fighting Illini	1937–38	1942–43	6	Independent
Carleton College	Northfield, Minnesota	Knights	1919–20	1924–25	6	MIAC
Western Reserve University (Note: The Case Institute of Technology merged with Western Reserve University in 1967 to form the current Case Western Reserve University.)	Cleveland, Ohio	Red Cats	1909–10	1940–41	6	Penn-Ohio League
Northern Arizona University	Flagstaff, Arizona	Lumberjacks	1981–82	1985–86	5	GWHC
Case Institute of Technology	Cleveland, Ohio	Rough Riders	1909–10	1940–41	5	Penn-Ohio League
Fenn College (Note: College acquired by Cleveland State University in 1965)	Cleveland, Ohio	Foxes	1937–38	1940–41	4	Penn-Ohio League
John Carroll University	University Heights, Ohio	Blue Streaks	1937–38	1940–41	4	Penn-Ohio League
Lafayette University	Easton, Pennsylvania	Leopards	1936–37	1940–41	4	Independent
Gonzaga University	Spokane, Washington	Bulldogs	1936–37	1939–40	4	PCC
University of Washington	Seattle, Washington	Huskies	1935–36	1938–39	4	PCC
St. Stephen's College	Annandale-on-Hudson, New York	Scarlet	1928–29	1931–32	4	Independent
State University of New York at Albany	Albany, New York	Statesmen	1915–16	1920–21	4	Independent
Johns Hopkins University	Baltimore, Maryland	None	1894–95	1897–98	4	BHL
University of Wyoming	Laramie, Wyoming	Cowboys	1948–49	1950–51	3	Independent
Massachusetts State College–Fort Devens	Ayer, Massachusetts	Chiefs	1946–47	1948–49	3	Independent
Duquesne University	Pittsburgh, Pennsylvania	Dukes	1937–38	1939–40	3	Penn-Ohio League
Stevens Institute of Technology	Hoboken, New Jersey	Ducks	1910–11	1915–16	3	Independent
University of Rochester	Rochester, New York	Yellowjackets	1906–07	1911–12	3	Independent
Ohio University	Athens, Ohio	Bobcats	1970–71	1972–73	2	CCHA
Baldwin Wallace College	Berea, Ohio	Yellow Jackets	1937–38	1938–39	2	Penn-Ohio League
Occidental College	Los Angeles, California	Tigers	1926–27	1927–28	2	Independent
A.T. Still College	Kirksville, Missouri	Rams	1922–23	1923–24	2	Independent
Fordham University	New York, New York	Rams	1919–20	1920–21	2	Independent
New York University	New York, New York	Violets	1912–13	1926–27	2	Independent
Polytechnic Institute of Brooklyn	Brooklyn, New York	None	1904–05	1908–09	2	Independent
Haverford College	Haverford, Pennsylvania	Fords	1897–98	1900–01	2	Independent
University of Maryland, Baltimore	Baltimore, Maryland	None	1896–97	1897–98	2	BHL
Southwestern Law School	Los Angeles, California	None	1926–27	1926–27	1	Independent
Swarthmore College	Swarthmore, Pennsylvania	Garnet	1900–01	1900–01	1	Independent
Pennsylvania College of Dental Surgery	Philadelphia, Pennsylvania	None	1897–98	1897–98	1	Independent

==== Women's ====
Institution	Location	Nickname	First season	Last season	Total seasons	Conference
University of North Dakota	Grand Forks, North Dakota	Fighting Hawks	2002–03	2016–17	15	WCHA
Niagara University	Lewiston, New York	Purple Eagles	1998–99	2011–12	14	CHA

=== Division II ===
==== Men's ====
Institution	Location	Nickname	First season	Last season	Total seasons	Conference
Macalester College	Saint Paul, Minnesota	Scots	1919–20	1974–75 (Note: Still holds record for second-most league titles)	51	MIAC
Boston State College	Boston, Massachusetts	Warriors	1962–83	1981–82 (Note: Boston State merged with Massachusetts Boston in 1982)	20	ECAC 2
University of New Haven	New Haven, Connecticut	Chargers	1967–68	1982–83	16	ECAC 2
Oberlin College	Oberlin, Ohio	Yeomen	1962–63	1977–78	16	MCCHA
University of Minnesota Crookston	Crookston, Minnesota	Golden Eagles	1998–99	2008–09	11	MCHA
Bridgewater State College	Bridgewater, Massachusetts	Bears	1970–71	1980–81	11	ECAC 2
Hillsdale College	Hillsdale, Michigan	Chargers	1969–70	1977–78	9	MCCHA
Ithaca College	Ithaca, New York	Bombers	1967–68	1975–76	9	ECAC 2
Worcester Polytechnic Institute	Worcester, Massachusetts	Engineers	1914–15	1971–72	7	WCHL
Bryant College	Smithfield, Rhode Island	Bulldogs	1973–74	1979–80	7	ECAC 2
Chicago State University	Chicago, Illinois	Cougars	1972–73	1978–79	7	MCCHA
Alaska Methodist University	Anchorage, Alaska	Vikings	1968–69	1972–73	5	Independent

=== Division III ===
==== Men's ====
Institution	Location	Nickname	First season	Last season	Total seasons	Conference
Massachusetts Institute of Technology	Boston, Massachusetts	Engineers	1897–98	1974–75	72	ECAC 3
University of Buffalo	Buffalo, New York	Bulls	1895–96	1986–87	31	ECAC West
Lehigh University	Bethlehem, Pennsylvania	Engineers	1939–40	1985–86	30	ECAC North/South
Northland College	Ashland, Wisconsin	Lumberjacks	1997–98	2024–25	28	WIAC
Finlandia University	Hancock, Michigan	Lions	2002–03	2022–23	21	NCHA
University of Scranton	Scranton, Pennsylvania	Royals	1985–86	2003–04	19	Independent
Villanova University	Villanova, Pennsylvania	Wildcats	1929–30	1997–98	19	ECAC North/South/Central
St. John's University	Queens, New York	Redmen	1928–29	1991–92	16	ECAC North/South
Becker College	Worcester, Massachusetts	Hawks	2006–07	2020–21	15	CCC
St. Bonaventure University	St. Bonaventure, New York	Brown Indians	1981–82	1992–93	12	ECAC West
Upsala College	East Orange, New Jersey	Vikings	1979–80	1987–88	9	ECAC North/South
Anna Maria College	Paxton, Massachusetts	Amcats	2018–19	2025–26	8	MASCAC
Gordon College	Wenham, Massachusetts	Fighting Scots	1974–75	1980–81	7	ECAC 3
Ramapo College	Mahwah, New Jersey	Roadrunners	1976–77	1980–81	5	ECAC 3
Hawthorne College	Antrim, New Hampshire	Highlanders	1984–85	1987–88	4	ECAC North/South
Queens College, City University of New York	Queens, New York	Knights	1976–77	1979–80	4	ECAC 3
City College of New York	New York, New York	Beavers	1900–01	1977–78	4	ECAC 3
Clark University	Worcester, Massachusetts	Cougars	1978–79	1980–81	3	ECAC 3
Massachusetts Maritime Academy	Buzzards Bay, Massachusetts	Buccaneers	1975–76	1977–78	3	ECAC 3
Bryn Athyn College	Bryn Athyn, Pennsylvania	Lions	2017–18	2019–20	3	Independent
Daniel Webster College	Antrim, New Hampshire	Eagles	2015–16	2016–17	2	Independent
Nasson College	Springvale, Maine	Lions	1972–73	1973–74	2	ECAC 3

==== Women's ====
Institution	Location	Nickname	First season	Last season	Total seasons	Conference
Finlandia University	Hancock, Michigan	Lions	2004–05	2022–23	18	NCHA
Northland College	Ashland, Wisconsin	Lumberjills	2016–17	2024–25	9	WIAC
Anna Maria College	Paxton, Massachusetts	Amcats	2018–19	2025–26	8	MASCAC

=== See also ===
- "List of Defunct teams". College Hockey News.

== Timeline ==
=== Legend ===
Currently Active
Currently Inactive

=== NCAA Tournament ===
==== Men's programs beginning after World War II thru 1975 ====
† Boston State merged with UMass Boston in 1982.
