= List of Quinnipiac Bobcats men's ice hockey seasons =

This is a season-by-season list of records compiled by Quinnipiac in men's ice hockey.

Despite being a Division II school the ice hockey team played as a Division III program until 1998 when the university raised all of its programs to the Division I level.

Quinnipiac won the first national championship for the university in 2023.

== Season-by-season results ==
Note: GP = Games played, W = Wins, L = Losses, T = Ties

NCAA D-I Champions	NCAA Frozen Four	Conference regular season champions	Conference Playoff Champions

Season	Conference	Regular Season (Note: Code explanation; GP—Games played, W—Wins, L—Losses, T—Tied games, OTW—Overtime Wins, OTL—Overtime Loses, 3/SW—Win in 3 on 3 overtime or shootout, Pts—Points*)														Conference Tournament Results	National Tournament Results
Season	Conference	Conference									Overall					Conference Tournament Results	National Tournament Results
Season	Conference	GP	W	L	T	OTW	OTL	3/SW	Pts*	Finish	GP	W	L	T	%	Conference Tournament Results	National Tournament Results
Division III
Jim Kennedy (1975–1979)
1975–76	Independent	–	–	–	–	–	–	–	–	–	13	8	5	0	.615		
1976–77	ECAC 3	9	0	9	0	–	–	–	.000	–	19	3	15	1	.184		
1977–78	ECAC 3	14	2	12	0	–	–	–	.143	–	19	7	12	0	.368		
1978–79	ECAC 3	–	–	–	–	–	–	–	–	–	20	4	16	0	.200		
Ralph O'Connor (1979–1980)
1979–80	ECAC 3	16	2	13	1	–	–	–	.156	–	19	5	13	1	.289		
Jim Armstrong (1980–1994)
1980–81	ECAC 3	20	5	14	1	–	–	–	.275	–	21	6	14	1	.310		
1981–82	ECAC 3	18	5	13	0	–	–	–	.278	–	24	10	14	0	.417		
1982–83	ECAC 3	20	6	14	0	–	–	–	.300	–	21	6	15	0	.286		
1983–84	ECAC 3	21	8	12	1	–	–	–	.405	–	24	10	13	1	.438		
1984–85	ECAC 3	24	13	11	0	–	–	–	.542	14th	29	15	14	0	.517		
1985–86	ECAC North/South	24	18	6	0	–	–	–	.750	–	27	18	8	1	.685		
1986–87	ECAC North/South	24	19	4	1	–	–	–	.813	–	30	22	7	1	.750	Won Semifinal, 6–3 (Connecticut College); Lost Championship, 5–7 (Trinity)	
1987–88	ECAC North/South	25	14	10	1	–	–	–	.580	–	26	14	11	1	.558	Lost Semifinal, 1–5 (Connecticut College)	
1988–89	ECAC North/South	21	12	9	0	–	–	–	.571	–	22	12	10	0	.545		
1989–90	ECAC North/South	21	8	13	0	–	–	–	.381	–	21	8	13	0	.381		
1990–91	ECAC North/South	22	3	17	2	–	–	–	.182	–	24	3	19	2	.167		
1991–92	ECAC North/South	21	5	15	1	–	–	–	.262	–	24	5	18	1	.229		
1992–93	ECAC South	11	3	8	0	–	–	–	.273	–	18	4	14	0	.222		
1993–94	ECAC South	13	4	9	0	–	–	–	.308	6th	24	6	18	0	.250		
Rand Pecknold (1994–Present)
1994–95	ECAC South	14	5	8	1	–	–	–	11	T–6th	22	6	15	1	.295		
1995–96	ECAC South	12	6	3	3	–	–	–	15	T–3rd	27	11	12	4	.481		
1996–97	ECAC South	14	8	6	0	–	–	–	16	4th	27	13	12	2	.519		
1997–98	ECAC South	0†	–	–	–	–	–	–	–	–	23	19	3	1	.848		
Division I
1998–99	MAAC	28	22	4	2	–	–	–	46	1st	34	26	6	2	.794	Won Quarterfinal, 13–2 (Fairfield); Lost Semifinal, 2–5 (Canisius)	
1999–00	MAAC	27	23	1	3	–	–	–	49	1st	36	27	6	3	.792	Won Quarterfinal, 9–2 (Bentley); Lost Semifinal, 2–6 (Iona)	
2000–01	MAAC	26	17	7	2	–	–	–	36	T–2nd	37	22	11	4	.649	Won Quarterfinal, 4–3 (OT) (Army); Won Semifinal, 4–1 (Iona); Lost Championship, 5–6 (Mercyhurst)	
University moniker changed from 'Braves' to 'Bobcats'
2001–02	MAAC	26	15	6	5	–	–	–	35	2nd	38	20	13	5	.592	Won Quarterfinal, 6–5 (2OT) (Iona); Won Semifinal, 3–2 (Sacred Heart); Won Championship, 6–4 (Mercyhurst)	Lost Regional Quarterfinal, 1–6 (Cornell)
2002–03	MAAC	26	18	7	1	–	–	–	37	2nd	36	22	13	1	.625	Won Quarterfinal, 3–2 (Canisius); Won Semifinal, 3–0 (Holy Cross); Lost Championship, 3–4 (Mercyhurst)	
2003–04	Atlantic Hockey	24	12	6	6	–	–	–	30	3rd	35	15	14	6	.514	Lost Quarterfinal, 0–1 (OT) (Canisius)	
2004–05	Atlantic Hockey	24	16	6	2	–	–	–	34	1st	37	21	13	3	.608	Won Quarterfinal, 2–0 (Army); Won Semifinal, 4–1 (Bentley); Lost Championship, 2–3 (OT) (Mercyhurst)	
2005–06	ECAC Hockey	22	8	13	1	–	–	–	17	T–9th	39	20	18	1	.526	Won First round series, 2–0 (Rensselaer); Lost Quarterfinal series, 1–2 (Colgate)	
2006–07	ECAC Hockey	22	10	8	4	–	–	–	24	T–4th	40	21	14	5	.588	Won First round series, 2–0 (Union); Won Quarterfinal series, 2–0 (Cornell); Won Semifinal, 4–0 (St. Lawrence); Lost Championship, 2–4 (Clarkson)	
2007–08	ECAC Hockey	22	9	9	4	–	–	–	22	T–6th	39	20	15	4	.564	Won First round series, 2–0 (Brown); Lost Quarterfinal series, 1–2 (Harvard)	
2008–09	ECAC Hockey	22	9	10	3	–	–	–	21	7th	39	18	18	3	.500	Won First round series, 2–1 (Colgate); Lost Quarterfinal series, 0–2 (St. Lawrence)	
2009–10	ECAC Hockey	22	11	11	0	–	–	–	22	7th	40	20	18	2	.525	Won First round series, 2–1 (Dartmouth); Lost Quarterfinal series, 1–2 (Union)	
2010–11	ECAC Hockey	22	6	9	7	–	–	–	19	T–7th	39	16	15	8	.513	Won First round series, 2–1 (Brown); Lost Quarterfinal series, 1–2 (Cornell)	
2011–12	ECAC Hockey	22	9	8	5	–	–	–	23	T–4th	40	20	14	6	.575	Won First round series, 2–1 (Brown); Lost Quarterfinal series, 1–2 (Colgate)	
2012–13	ECAC Hockey	22	17	2	3	–	–	–	37	1st	43	30	8	5	.756	Won Quarterfinal series, 2–1 (Cornell); Lost Semifinal, 0–4 (Brown); Won Third-place game, 3–0 (Yale)	Won Regional Semifinal, 4–3 (Canisius); Won Regional Final, 5–1 (Union); Won National Semifinal, 4–1 (St. Cloud State); Lost National Championship, 0–4 (Yale)
2013–14	ECAC Hockey	22	12	6	4	–	–	–	28	3rd	40	24	10	6	.675	Won Quarterfinal series, 2–0 (Yale); Lost Semifinal, 2–3 (2OT) (Colgate)	Lost Regional Semifinal, 0–4 (Providence)
2014–15	ECAC Hockey	22	16	3	3	–	–	–	35	1st	39	23	12	4	.641	Won Quarterfinal series, 2–1 (Union); Lost Semifinal, 2–5 (Harvard)	Lost Regional Semifinal, 1–4 (North Dakota)
2015–16	ECAC Hockey	22	16	1	5	–	–	–	37	1st	43	32	4	7	.826	Won Quarterfinal series, 2–1 (Cornell); Won Semifinal, 3–1 (Dartmouth); Won Championship, 4–1 (Harvard)	Won Regional Semifinal, 4–3 (RIT); Won Regional Final, 4–1 (Massachusetts–Lowell); Won National Semifinal, 3–2 (Boston College); Lost National Championship, 1–5 (North Dakota)
2016–17	ECAC Hockey	22	13	8	1	–	–	–	27	5th	40	23	15	2	.600	Won First round series, 2–0 (Brown); Won Quarterfinal series, 2–1 (St. Lawrence); Lost Semifinal, 1–4 (Harvard)	
2017–18	ECAC Hockey	22	9	11	2	–	–	–	20	9th	38	16	18	4	.474	Won First round series, 2–0 (Yale); Lost Quarterfinal series, 0–2 (Cornell)	
2018–19	ECAC Hockey	22	14	6	2	–	–	–	30	T–1st	38	26	10	2	.711	Lost Quarterfinal series, 0–2 (Brown)	Won Regional Semifinal, 2–1 (Arizona State); Lost Regional Final, 1–3 (Minnesota–Duluth)
2019–20	ECAC Hockey	22	14	6	2	–	–	–	30	3rd	34	21	11	2	.647	Tournament Cancelled	
2020–21	ECAC Hockey	18	10	4	4	1	1	3	.685	1st	29	17	8	4	.655	Lost Championship, 2–3 (OT) (St. Lawrence)	Lost Regional Semifinal, 3–4 (OT) (Minnesota State)
2021–22	ECAC Hockey	22	17	4	1	0	1	1	54	1st	42	32	7	3	.798	Won Quarterfinal series, 2–0 (St. Lawrence); Won Semifinal, 3–1 (Colgate); Lost Championship, 0–2 (Harvard)	Won Regional Semifinal, 5–4 (St. Cloud State); Lost Regional Final, 4–7 (Michigan)
2022–23	ECAC Hockey	22	20	2	0	0	0	0	60	1st	41	34	4	3	.866	Won Quarterfinal series, 2–0 (Yale); Lost Semifinal, 1–2 (2OT) (Colgate)	Won Regional Semifinal, 5–0 (Merrimack); Won Regional Final, 4–1 (Ohio State); Won National Semifinal, 5–2 (Michigan); Won National Championship, 3–2 (OT) (Minnesota)
2023–24	ECAC Hockey	22	17	4	1	0	2	0	54	1st	39	27	10	2	.718	Won Quarterfinal series, 2–0 (Rensselaer); Lost Semifinal, 0–3 (St. Lawrence)	Won Regional Semifinal, 3–2 (OT) (Wisconsin); Lost Regional Final, 4–5 (OT) (Boston College)
2024–25	ECAC Hockey	22	16	5	1	2	3	0	50	1st	38	24	12	2	.658	Won Quarterfinal series, 2–0 (Brown); Lost Semifinal, 2–3 (OT) (Cornell)	Lost Regional Semifinal, 1–4 (Connecticut)
2025–26	ECAC Hockey	22	15	4	1	2	0	0	50	1st	40	27	10	3	.682	Lost Quarterfinal series, 2–0 (Clarkson)	Lost Regional Final, 0–5 (North Dakota)
Totals											GP	W	L	T	%	Championships	
Regular Season											1433	759	557	117	.570	2 MAAC Championships, 1 Atlantic Hockey Championship, 9 ECAC Hockey Championships	
Conference Post-season											101	60	41	0	.592	1 MAAC tournament championship, 1 ECAC tournament championship	
NCAA Post-season											23	13	10	0	.565	10 NCAA Tournament appearances	
Regular Season and Post-season Record											1557	832	608	117	.572	1 NCAA Division I National Championship	

* Winning percentage is used when conference schedules are unbalanced.
† Quinnipiac was ruled ineligible for postseason play and their divisional games were not counted in conference standings as a result of the program offering athletic scholarships.
