= John Dunham =

American ice hockey coach

Biographical details
- Education: Brown University; UConn

Playing career
- 1961–1964: Brown
- Position: Goaltender

Coaching career (HC unless noted)
- 1970–2007: Trinity
- 2009–Present: Avon Old Farms (volunteer)
- 2011: Trinity (interim)

Head coaching record
- Overall: 441–306–34 (.586)
- Tournaments: 1–2 (.333)

Accomplishments and honors

Championships
- 1985 ECAC 3 Champion; 1986 ECAC South Division Champion; 1986 ECAC South Tournament Champion; 1986 ECAC North/South Tournament Champion; 1987 ECAC South Division Champion; 1987 ECAC North/South Champion; 1987 ECAC South Tournament Champion; 1987 ECAC North/South Tournament Champion; 1988 ECAC South Division Champion; 1988 ECAC North/South Champion; 1988 ECAC South Tournament Champion; 1988 ECAC North/South Tournament Champion; 1991 ECAC South Tournament Champion; 1991 ECAC North/South Tournament Champion; 2003 NESCAC Tournament Champion; 2005 NESCAC Champion

John M. Dunham is a retired lawyer and ice hockey coach who previously led the men's program at Trinity College for 37 years.

== Career ==
After graduating from the Taft School in 1960, Dunham began attending Brown University in the fall of 1960. After a year with the freshman team, he began playing for the varsity squad and helped the Bears produce winning records in his junior and senior seasons. Dunham graduated from Brown in 1965 with a degree in history and then matriculated to the University of Connecticut where he earned a JD in 1969.

Dunham was enticed back to hockey when Trinity College brought him in as the head coach for their club team. Four years later, Dunham was able to convince the school's administration to promote the program to varsity status. Dunham swiftly made the Bantams competitive in their conference but, beginning in 1980, the team flagged and moved into the middle of the pack. In 1985 he brought about a stark revival of the program and had the Bantams at the top of their league for the remainder of the decade.

In 1991, after 4 conference titles in 6 years, Dunham got his team to move from ECAC North/South, the conference with the lowest reputation at the Division III level, into ECAC East. Unsurprisingly, the change to a stronger league caused the Bantams' record to decline but the team slowly progressed throughout the 1990s. In 1999, the NESCAC, Trinity's primary conference, began sponsoring ice hockey with Trinity joining in the new conference. After a poor start, The Bantams became one of the top teams under Dunham's leadership and won the conference championship in 2003, earning them their first appearance in the NCAA Tournament. Two years later, the team made the Frozen Four.

Dunham retired as the team's coach in 2007, having led any of Trinity's athletic programs for the longest duration. In his retirement, Dunham couldn't stay inactive for long and began volunteering as a coach for Avon Old Farms, a College-preparatory school near his home in West Hartford, Connecticut. In 2011, Dunham agreed to serve as the interim head coach for Trinity after the sudden resignation of David Cataruzolo. He remained in charge for three months, allowing the school to bring in Matthew Greason as the program's third head coach just prior to the start of the season.

Dunham was inducted into the Brown Athletic Hall of Fame in 2011.

== Head coaching record ==
Record table
Season	Team	Overall	Conference	Standing	Postseason
Trinity Bantams (ECAC 3) (1974–1985)
1974–75	Trinity	9–8–0	8–4–0	T–5th	
1975–76	Trinity	5–14–1	3–7–1	12th	
1976–77	Trinity	12–10–0	10–4–0	5th	ECAC 3 Semifinals
1977–78	Trinity	12–9–0	10–5–0	T–5th	ECAC 3 Runner-Up
1978–79	Trinity	16–6–0	14–3–0	4th	ECAC 3 Runner-Up
1979–80	Trinity	9–11–0	8–6–0	9th	
1980–81	Trinity	7–14–0	6–10–0	18th	
1981–82	Trinity	10–10–1	9–6–1	8th	
1982–83	Trinity	10–11–1	10–5–0	9th	
1983–84	Trinity	11–11–1	9–6–1	13th	
1984–85	Trinity	16–8–0	14–2–0	1st	ECAC 3 Runner-Up
Trinity:		117–112–4	101–58–3		
Trinity Bantams (ECAC North/South) (1985–1991)
1985–86	Trinity	22–5–0	15–1–0	T–2nd	ECAC North/South Champion
1986–87	Trinity	24–1–0	17–0–0	1st	ECAC North/South Champion
1987–88	Trinity	22–4–0	18–0–0	T–1st	ECAC North/South Champion
1988–89	Trinity	19–7–0	12–5–0	7th	ECAC South Division Runner-Up
1989–90	Trinity	18–7–0	16–3–0	2nd	ECAC South Division Runner-Up
1990–91	Trinity	17–8–1	13–3–1	5th	ECAC North/South Champion
Trinity:		122–32–1	91–12–1		
Trinity Bantams (ECAC East) (1991–1998)
1991–92	Trinity	10–10–4	4–9–2	13th	
1992–93	Trinity	8–13–2	4–13–2	14th	
1993–94	Trinity	8–13–2	5–10–2	T–12th	
1994–95	Trinity	14–8–2	9–6–2	T–7th	
1995–96	Trinity	8–12–2	7–11–1	13th	
1996–97	Trinity	11–13–0	9–10–0	11th	ECAC East First Round
1997–98	Trinity	11–11–2	9–8–2	T–10th	ECAC East First Round
1998–99	Trinity	14–11–0	11–6–0	T–5th	ECAC East Semifinals
Trinity:		84–91–14	58–73–11		
Trinity Bantams (NESCAC) (1999–2007)
1999–00	Trinity	9–14–0	6–11–0	8th	
2000–01	Trinity	15–7–2	12–4–1	T–3rd	NESCAC Quarterfinals
2001–02	Trinity	17–8–1	13–5–1	T–3rd	NESCAC Runner-Up
2002–03	Trinity	19–6–2	13–3–1	2nd	NCAA Quarterfinals
2003–04	Trinity	16–9–1	12–5–1	2nd	NESCAC Runner-Up
2004–05	Trinity	21–4–2	15–2–2	1st	NCAA Frozen Four
2005–06	Trinity	13–10–3	9–7–3	5th	NESCAC Semifinals
2006–07	Trinity	8–13–4	6–10–3	8th	NESCAC Quarterfinals
Trinity:		118–71–15	86–47–12		
Total:		441–306–34			
National champion Postseason invitational champion Conference regular season champion Conference regular season and conference tournament champion Division regular season champion Division regular season and conference tournament champion Conference tournament champion

== See also ==
- List of college men's ice hockey coaches with 400 wins
