= List of Minnesota State Mavericks men's ice hockey seasons =

This is a season-by-season list of records compiled by Minnesota State in men's ice hockey.

Minnesota State has made several appearances in the NCAA Tournament and won 1980 Division II National Championship.

== Season-by-season results ==
Note: GP = Games played, W = Wins, L = Losses, T = Ties

NCAA Champions	NCAA Frozen Four	Conference regular season champions	Conference Playoff Champions

Season	Conference	Regular Season (Note: Code explanation; GP—Games Played, W—Wins, L—Losses, T—Tied games, OTW—Overtime Wins, OTL—Overtime Loses, 3/SW—Win in 3 on 3 overtime or shootout, Pts—Points*)														Conference Tournament Results	National Tournament Results
Season	Conference	Conference									Overall					Conference Tournament Results	National Tournament Results
Season	Conference	GP	W	L	T	OTW	OTL	3/SW	Pts*	Finish	GP	W	L	T	%	Conference Tournament Results	National Tournament Results
College Division
Don Brose (1969–1983)
1969–70	Independent	–	–	–	–	–	–	–	–	–	14	5	8	1	.393		
1970–71	Independent	–	–	–	–	–	–	–	–	–	18	15	2	1	.861		
1971–72	Independent	–	–	–	–	–	–	–	–	–	20	13	6	1	.675		
1972–73	Independent	–	–	–	–	–	–	–	–	–	19	14	4	1	.763		
Division II
1973–74	Independent	–	–	–	–	–	–	–	–	–	21	8	11	2	.429		
1974–75	Independent	–	–	–	–	–	–	–	–	–	22	14	8	0	.636	Won WCT Final Series, 3–2, 6–2 (Illinois–Chicago)	
1975–76	Independent	–	–	–	–	–	–	–	–	–	32	20	11	1	.641	Won WCT Semifinal, 5–1 (St. John's); Won WCT Final, 5–2 (Hamline)	
1976–77	Independent	–	–	–	–	–	–	–	–	–	28	17	10	1	.625	Lost WCT Series, 4–4 (OT), 4–5 (St. Cloud State)	
1977–78	Independent	–	–	–	–	–	–	–	–	–	34	17	16	1	.515	Won WCT Semifinal, 7–3 (Illinois–Chicago); Lost WCT Final, 3–2 (Lake Forest)	Lost Semifinal, 1–6 (Merrimack); Won Third-place game, 5–3 (Elmira)
1978–79	Independent	–	–	–	–	–	–	–	–	–	38	25	12	1	.671	Won WCT Semifinal, 4–3 (St. Cloud State); Tied WCT Final, 4–4 (OT) (Illinois–Chicago)	Won Semifinal, 5–3 (Salem State); Lost Championship, 4–6 (Lowell)
1979–80	Independent	–	–	–	–	–	–	–	–	–	40	30	9	1	.763	Won WRT Semifinal, 5–2 (Gustavus Adolphus); Won WRT Final, 14–6 (St. Scholastica)	Won Semifinal, 8–1 (Lowell); Won Championship, 5–2 (Elmira)
1980–81	NCHA	16	11	5	0	–	–	–	.688	1st	42	28	11	3	.702	Lost WRT series, 7–8 (Gustavus Adolphus)	Lost Semifinal, 7–8 (OT) (Lowell); Won Third-place game, 9–7 (Concordia)
1981–82	NCHA	18	11	6	1	–	–	–	.639	2nd	32	22	9	1	.703		Lost Quarterfinal series, 7–11 (Merrimack)
1982–83	NCHA	20	14	5	1	–	–	–	29	T–2nd	37	26	10	1	.716	Won Western Tournament Quarterfinal, 11–6 (Lake Forest); Won Western Tournament Semifinal, 5–2 (Gustavus Adolphus); Lost Western tournament championship, 5–2 (Bemidji State)	Lost Quarterfinal series, 7–9 (RIT)
Brad Reeves (1983–1984)
1983–84	NCHA	18	11	7	0	–	–	–	22	T–2nd	30	16	14	0	.533		
Division III
Don Brose (1984–2000)
1984–85	NCHA	18	8	7	3	–	–	–	19	3rd	35	19	12	4	.600	Won Western Tournament Quarterfinal series, 15–2 (Wisconsin–River Falls); Lost Western Tournament Semifinal, 1–4 (St. Thomas); Won Western Tournament Third-place game, 6–5 (Gustavus Adolphus)	Lost Quarterfinal series, 6–11 (Bemidji State)
1985–86	NCHA	18	11	5	2	–	–	–	24	T–1st	38	26	9	3	.724	Won Semifinal series, 6–5 (St. Scholastica); Lost Championship series, 9–10 (Bemidji State)	Won Quarterfinal series, 2–1 (St. Thomas); Lost Semifinal, 5–7 (Plattsburgh State); Lost Third-place game, 0–6 (RIT)
1986–87	NCHA	20	13	6	1	–	–	–	27	T–1st	32	21	10	1	.672	Lost Semifinal series, 0–2 (Bemidji State)	
1987–88	NCHA	24	14	8	2	–	–	–	30	4th	32	18	11	3	.609	Lost Semifinal series, 0–2 (Wisconsin–River Falls)	
1988–89	NCHA	24	10	10	4	–	–	–	24	5th	30	13	13	4	.500	Lost Semifinal series, 1–2 (Wisconsin–Stevens Point)	
1989–90	NCHA	24	13	9	2	–	–	–	28	3rd	37	15	14	8	.514	Won Semifinal series, 1–0–2 (Wisconsin–Eau Claire); Lost Championship series, 0–1–1 (Wisconsin–Stevens Point)	Won Quarterfinal series, 1–0–1 (Gustavus Adolphus); Lost Semifinal series, 0–1–1 (Wisconsin–Stevens Point)
1990–91	NCHA	24	16	3	5	–	–	–	37	T–1st	36	23	7	6	.722	Won Semifinal series, 2–0 (Wisconsin–Superior); Lost Championship series, 0–2 (Wisconsin–Stevens Point)	Won Quarterfinal series, 1–0–1 (Gustavus Adolphus); Won Semifinal, 7–3 (Elmira); Lost Championship, 2–6 (Wisconsin–Stevens Point)
1991–92	NCHA	20	11	7	2	–	–	–	24	3rd	34	17	14	3	.544	Won Semifinal series, 2–1 (Wisconsin–Superior); Lost Championship series, 0–1–1 (Wisconsin–Stevens Point)	Lost Quarterfinal series, 0–2 (Wisconsin–Superior)
Division II
1992–93	Independent	–	–	–	–	–	–	–	–	–	36	12	17	7	.431		
1993–94	Independent	–	–	–	–	–	–	–	–	–	27	11	15	1	.426		
1994–95	Independent	–	–	–	–	–	–	–	–	–	31	19	12	0	.613		
1995–96	Independent	–	–	–	–	–	–	–	–	–	32	16	12	4	.563		
Division I
1996–97	Independent	–	–	–	–	–	–	–	–	–	34	17	14	3	.544		
1997–98	Independent	–	–	–	–	–	–	–	–	–	38	15	17	6	.474	Lost WCHA first round series, 0–2 (North Dakota)	
1998–99	Independent	–	–	–	–	–	–	–	–	–	39	18	16	5	.526	Lost WCHA first round series, 1–2 (North Dakota)	
1999–00	WCHA	28	15	10	3	–	–	–	33	4th	39	21	14	4	.590	Won First round series, 2–0 (Alaska–Anchorage); Lost Quarterfinal, 4–6 (Minnesota)	
Troy Jutting (2000–2012)
2000–01	WCHA	28	13	14	1	–	–	–	27	7th	38	19	18	1	.513	Lost First round series, 0–2 (Colorado College)	
2001–02	WCHA	28	11	15	2	–	–	–	24	T–6th	38	16	20	2	.447	Lost First round series, 0–2 (Wisconsin)	
2002–03	WCHA	28	15	6	7	–	–	–	37	T–2nd	41	20	11	10	.610	Won First round series, 2–0 (Wisconsin); Lost Semifinal, 2–3 (OT) (Minnesota); Lost Third-place game, 4–6 (Minnesota–Duluth)	Lost Regional semifinal, 2–5 (Cornell)
2003–04	WCHA	28	6	18	4	–	–	–	16	9th	39	10	24	5	.389	Lost First round series, 1–2 (Minnesota–Duluth)	
2004–05	WCHA	28	8	16	4	–	–	–	20	8th	38	13	19	6	.421	Lost First round series, 0–2 (Minnesota)	
2005–06	WCHA	28	12	13	3	–	–	–	27	7th	39	17	18	4	.487	Lost First round series, 0–2 (North Dakota)	
2006–07	WCHA	28	10	13	3	–	–	–	25	8th	38	13	19	6	.421	Lost First round series, 0–2 (North Dakota)	
2007–08	WCHA	28	12	12	4	–	–	–	28	T–4th	39	19	16	4	.538	Lost First round series, 1–2 (Minnesota)	
2008–09	WCHA	28	11	13	4	–	–	–	26	8th	38	15	17	6	.474	Lost First round series, 0–2 (Wisconsin)	
2009–10	WCHA	28	9	17	2	–	–	–	20	T–8th	39	16	20	3	.449	Lost First round series, 1–2 (St. Cloud State)	
2010–11	WCHA	28	8	16	4	–	–	–	20	11th	38	14	18	6	.447	Lost First round series, 0–2 (Denver)	
2011–12	WCHA	28	8	18	2	–	–	–	18	11th	38	12	24	2	.342	Lost First round series, 0–2 (Minnesota–Duluth)	
Mike Hastings (2012–2023)
2012–13	WCHA	28	16	11	1	–	–	–	33	T–4th	41	24	14	3	.622	Won First round series, 2–1 (Nebraska–Omaha); Lost Quarterfinal, 2–7 (Wisconsin)	Lost Regional semifinal, 0–4 (Miami)
2013–14	WCHA	28	20	7	1	–	–	–	41	2nd	41	26	14	1	.646	Won First round series, 2–0 (Northern Michigan); Won Semifinal, 4–0 (Bowling Green); Won Championship, 4–1 (Ferris State)	Lost Regional semifinal, 1–2 (Massachusetts–Lowell)
2014–15	WCHA	28	21	4	3	–	–	–	45	1st	40	29	8	3	.763	Won First round series, 2–0 (Lake Superior State); Won Semifinal, 4–0 (Ferris State); Won Championship, 5–2 (Michigan Tech)	Lost Regional semifinal, 1–2 (RIT)
2015–16	WCHA	28	16	5	7	–	–	–	39	T–1st	41	21	13	7	.598	Won First round series, 2–1 (Lake Superior State); Won Semifinal, 2–1 (Bowling Green); Lost Championship, 1–2 (Ferris State)	
2016–17	WCHA	28	15	9	4	–	–	2	51	3rd	39	22	13	4	.615	Won First round series, 2–0 (Alaska); Lost Semifinal series, 1–2 (Michigan Tech)	
2017–18	WCHA	28	22	5	1	–	–	0	67	1st	40	29	10	1	.738	Won First round series, 2–0 (Alaska); Lost Semifinal series, 1–2 (Michigan Tech)	Lost Regional semifinal, 2–3 (OT) (Minnesota–Duluth)
2018–19	WCHA	28	22	5	1	–	–	1	68	1st	42	32	8	2	.786	Won Quarterfinal series, 2–0 (Alabama–Huntsville); Won Semifinal series, 2–0 (Lake Superior State); Won Championship, 3–2 (OT) (Bowling Green)	Lost Regional semifinal, 3–6 (Providence)
2019–20	WCHA	28	23	4	1	–	–	1	71	1st	38	31	5	2	.842	Won Quarterfinal series, 2–0 (Alaska Anchorage); Tournament Cancelled	
2020–21	WCHA	14	13	1	0	1	1	0	39	1st	28	22	5	1	.804	Won Quarterfinal series, 2–0 (Ferris State); Lost Semifinal, 1–5 (Northern Michigan)	Won Regional semifinal, 4–3 (OT) (Quinnipiac); Won Regional Final, 4–0 (Minnesota); Lost National semifinal, 4–5 (St. Cloud State)
2021–22	CCHA	26	23	3	0	0	2	0	67	1st	44	38	6	0	.864	Won Quarterfinal series, 2–0 (St. Thomas); Won Semifinal, 8–1 (Northern Michigan); Won Championship, 2–1 (OT) (Bemidji State)	Won Regional semifinal, 4–3 (Harvard); Won Regional Final, 1–0 (Notre Dame); Won National semifinal, 5–1 (Minnesota); Lost National Championship, 1–5 (Denver)
2022–23	CCHA	26	16	9	1	2	4	1	52	1st	39	25	13	1	.654	Won Quarterfinal series, 2–0 (Lake Superior State); Won Semifinal, 7–2 (Ferris State); Won Championship, 3–2 (OT) (Northern Michigan)	Lost Regional semifinal, 0–4 (St. Cloud State)
Luke Strand (2023–Present)
2023–24	CCHA	24	12	10	2	2	1	1	38	4th	37	18	15	4	.541	Won Quarterfinal series, 2–0 (Northern Michigan); Lost Semifinal, 3–4 (Michigan Tech)	
2024–25	CCHA	26	18	5	3	3	1	1	56	1st	39	27	9	3	.731	Won Quarterfinal series, 2–0 (Lake Superior State); Won Semifinal, 4–0 (Bemidji State); Won Championship, 4–2 (St. Thomas)	Lost Regional semifinal, 1–2 (2OT) (Western Michigan)
Totals											GP	W	L	T	%	Championships	
Regular Season											1779	996	627	156	.604	4 NCHA Championships, 6 WCHA Championships, 3 CCHA Championships	
Conference Post-season											127	66	55	6	.543	4 Western Regional Tournament championships, 3 WCHA Tournament championships, 3 CCHA Tournament championships	
NCAA Post-season											43	17	23	3	.430	10 NCAA D–I Tournament appearances, 6 NCAA D–II Tournament appearances, 5 NCAA D–III Tournament appearances	
Regular Season and Post-season Record											1949	1079	705	165	.596	1 D–II National Championship	

* Winning percentage is used when conference schedules are unbalanced.
