= Hubie McDonough =

American ice hockey player

- Born: July 8, 1963 (age 63) Manchester, New Hampshire, U.S.
- Height: 5 ft 9 in (175 cm)
- Weight: 180 lb (82 kg; 12 st 12 lb)
- Position: Center
- Shot: Left
- Played for: Los Angeles Kings; New York Islanders; San Jose Sharks
- NHL draft: Undrafted
- Playing career: 1986–2002

Hubert Boniface McDonough (born July 8, 1963) is an American professional ice hockey executive and former player. He played in the National Hockey League (NHL) between 1988 and 1993 with the Los Angeles Kings, New York Islanders, and San Jose Sharks. He is a member of the New Hampshire Hockey Hall of Fame, joining his father and brother.

== Playing career ==
After playing four seasons of NCAA Division II hockey at Saint Anselm College in Goffstown, New Hampshire, McDonough made his professional debut with the International Hockey League's Flint Spirits in the 1986–87 season. McDonough made the National Hockey League in the 1988–89 season, playing in four games with the Los Angeles Kings. Hubie McDonough was nominated as a finalist for the Hobey Baker Award in his junior year at St. Anselm College 1984–1985.

McDonough played 22 more games with the Kings in the 1989–90 season before being traded to the New York Islanders, along with Ken Baumgartner, in exchange for Mikko Mäkelä. After McDonough played 139 games with the Islanders over three seasons, they traded him to the San Jose Sharks for cash before the 1992–93 season.

McDonough played 30 games with the Sharks that season, and then spent the remainder of his career in the minor leagues: seven seasons in the IHL, including four with the Orlando Solar Bears, and five games of the 2001–02 season in the American Hockey League with his hometown Manchester Monarchs.

In his NHL career, McDonough appeared in 195 games. He scored 40 goals and added 26 assists. He also appeared in five playoff games with the Islanders in 1990, scoring one goal.

== Management career ==
McDonough was the Director of Hockey Operations for the Manchester Monarchs of the American Hockey League beginning in 2001. He held the same position with the Orlando Solar Bears of the International Hockey League for the 2000–01 season, when the team won the Turner Cup. He was also an assistant coach for the Manchester Monarchs in the 2014–2015 season.

== Career statistics ==
=== Regular season and playoffs ===
| | | | Regular season | | | | | Playoffs |
| Season | Team | League | GP | G | A | Pts | PIM | GP | G | A | Pts | PIM |
|---|---|---|---|---|---|---|---|---|---|---|---|---|
| 1947–48 | New Hampton School | HS-NH | — | — | — | — | — | — | — | — | — | — |
| 1982–83 | Saint Anselm College | NCAA-III | 27 | 24 | 21 | 45 | 12 | — | — | — | — | — |
| 1983–84 | Saint Anselm College | NCAA-III | 26 | 37 | 15 | 52 | 20 | — | — | — | — | — |
| 1984–85 | Saint Anselm College | NCAA-III | 26 | 41 | 30 | 71 | 48 | — | — | — | — | — |
| 1985–86 | Saint Anselm College | NCAA-III | 25 | 22 | 20 | 42 | 16 | — | — | — | — | — |
| 1986–87 | Flint Spirits | IHL | 82 | 27 | 52 | 79 | 59 | 6 | 3 | 2 | 5 | 0 |
| 1987–88 | New Haven Nighthawks | AHL | 78 | 30 | 29 | 59 | 43 | — | — | — | — | — |
| 1988–89 | Los Angeles Kings | NHL | 4 | 0 | 1 | 1 | 0 | — | — | — | — | — |
| 1988–89 | New Haven Nighthawks | AHL | 74 | 37 | 55 | 92 | 41 | 17 | 10 | 21 | 31 | 6 |
| 1989–90 | Los Angeles Kings | NHL | 22 | 3 | 4 | 7 | 10 | — | — | — | — | — |
| 1989–90 | New York Islanders | NHL | 54 | 18 | 11 | 29 | 26 | 5 | 1 | 0 | 1 | 4 |
| 1990–91 | New York Islanders | NHL | 52 | 6 | 6 | 12 | 10 | — | — | — | — | — |
| 1990–91 | Capital District Islanders | AHL | 17 | 9 | 9 | 18 | 4 | — | — | — | — | — |
| 1991–92 | New York Islanders | NHL | 33 | 7 | 2 | 9 | 15 | — | — | — | — | — |
| 1991–92 | Capital District Islanders | AHL | 21 | 11 | 18 | 29 | 14 | — | — | — | — | — |
| 1992–93 | San Jose Sharks | NHL | 30 | 6 | 2 | 8 | 6 | — | — | — | — | — |
| 1992–93 | San Diego Gulls | IHL | 48 | 26 | 49 | 75 | 26 | 14 | 4 | 7 | 11 | 6 |
| 1993–94 | San Diego Gulls | IHL | 69 | 31 | 48 | 79 | 61 | 8 | 0 | 7 | 7 | 6 |
| 1994–95 | San Diego Gulls | IHL | 80 | 43 | 55 | 98 | 10 | 5 | 0 | 1 | 1 | 4 |
| 1995–96 | Los Angeles Ice Dogs | IHL | 11 | 11 | 9 | 20 | 10 | — | — | — | — | — |
| 1995–96 | Orlando Solar Bears | IHL | 58 | 26 | 32 | 58 | 40 | 23 | 7 | 11 | 18 | 10 |
| 1996–97 | Orlando Solar Bears | IHL | 68 | 30 | 25 | 55 | 60 | 10 | 5 | 8 | 13 | 6 |
| 1997–98 | Orlando Solar Bears | IHL | 80 | 32 | 33 | 65 | 62 | 17 | 11 | 10 | 21 | 2 |
| 1998–99 | Orlando Solar Bears | IHL | 74 | 20 | 33 | 53 | 52 | 17 | 2 | 12 | 14 | 14 |
| 2001–02 | Manchester Monarchs | AHL | 5 | 0 | 0 | 0 | 0 | — | — | — | — | — |
| IHL totals | | | 570 | 246 | 336 | 582 | 380 | 100 | 32 | 58 | 90 | 48 |
| NHL totals | | | 195 | 40 | 26 | 66 | 67 | 5 | 1 | 0 | 1 | 4 |
