= Lehigh Mountain Hawks men's ice hockey =

- University: Lehigh University
- Conference: ECHA
- First season: 1939–40
- Head coach: Josh Hand
- Arena: Steel Ice Center; Bethlehem, Pennsylvania
- Colors: Brown and white

Conference tournament champions
- EPIHL: 1942

The Lehigh Mountain Hawks men's ice hockey team is a college ice hockey program that represents Lehigh University. The program currently operates as a club team at the Division I level but the university previously sponsored varsity ice hockey.

== History ==
After the construction of the Albeth Ice Rink in 1939, Lehigh was able to add a varsity program, furthering the expansion of college ice hockey in the Philadelphia area. The team was one of handful of clubs at the time and, while most were classified as club organizations, they were all able to play one another after reaching an agreement with the Philadelphia Arena. The league shuttered in 1942 due to World War II and remained dormant after the war's end. Lehigh, however, restarted its program in 1946 and continued on for over a decade. On the ice, the team was able to get some success in the early-50s. However, due to Albeth being an open-air rink that was designed for figure skating, the Engineers had a hard time scheduling home games. By the mid-50s, the Engineers were down to playing just a few games per year and eventually the athletic department decided against continuing the program after 1956. In spite of the lack of support, the team continued on as a club sport for several years.

Lehigh had its second revival in 1969 as the proliferation of College Division hockey was skyrocketing. The team joined ECAC 2 upon their return and, two years later, becoming an inaugural member of ECAC 3. Lehigh produced a few good seasons in the mid-70s but the team's success did not last. For most of their time in ECAC 3, Lehigh was in the bottom half of the standings and never made an appearance in the conference tournament. After a short break in the early 80s, the school gave the program one more chance at varsity status but four more years with little to show for its efforts consigned the team to demotion.

After returning to club status in 1986, the team has continued as unofficial representatives of the school. As of 2024, the team is a member of the ECHA and coached by Josh Hand.

== Season-by-season results ==
=== Varsity ===
NCAA D-I Champions	NCAA Frozen Four	Conference Regular Season Champions	Conference Playoff Champions

Season	Conference	Regular Season (Note: Code explanation; GP—Games Played, W—Wins, L—Losses, T—Tied games, Pts—Points)											Conference Tournament Results	National Tournament Results
Season	Conference	Conference						Overall					Conference Tournament Results	National Tournament Results
Season	Conference	GP	W	L	T	Pts*	Finish	GP	W	L	T	%	Conference Tournament Results	National Tournament Results
Charles W. Simmons (1939–1942)
Program suspended
1939–40	EPIHL	–	–	–	–	–	–	5	1	4	0	.200		
1940–41	EPIHL	–	–	–	–	–	–	12	4	8	0	.333		
1941–42	EPIHL	–	–	–	–	–	–	13	7	6	0	.538	Won Semifinal, 2–0 (St. Joseph's); Won Championship, 3–2 (Pennsylvania)	
Program suspended
Charles W. Simmons (1946–1953)
1946–47	Independent	–	–	–	–	–	–	5	0	5	0	.000		
1947–48	Independent	–	–	–	–	–	–	10	0	10	0	.000		
1948–49	Independent	–	–	–	–	–	–	6	2	4	0	.333		
1949–50	Independent	–	–	–	–	–	–	6	4	2	0	.667		
1950–51	Independent	–	–	–	–	–	–	5	4	1	0	.800		
1951–52	Independent	–	–	–	–	–	–	3	2	1	0	.667		
1952–53	Independent	–	–	–	–	–	–	3	2	1	0	.667		
Program suspended
Frey (1955–1956)
1955–56	Independent	–	–	–	–	–	–	8	2	5	1	.313		
Program suspended
College Division
Marty Matijasich (1969–1970)
1969–70	ECAC 2	5	2	2	1	.500	15th	15	12	2	1	.833		
Jim Todaro (1970–1971)
1970–71	ECAC 2	6	1	5	0	.167	25th	19	9	10	0	.474		
Gary Bishop (1971–1973)
1971–72	ECAC 3	5	0	5	0	.000	T–7th	18	7	11	0	.389		
1972–73	ECAC 3	6	0	6	0	.000	12th	19	8	11	0	.421		
Division III
Don Cahoon (1973–1974)
1973–74	ECAC 3	1	0	1	0	.000	T–17th	17	10	5	2	.647		
Joe Biedron (1974–1976)
1974–75	ECAC 3	1	0	1	0	.000	T–18th	16	10	4	2	.688		
1975–76	ECAC 3	7	2	5	0	.286	13th	18	10	7	1	.583		
Steve Penman (1976–1981)
1976–77	ECAC 3	6	4	2	0	.667	8th	16	11	5	0	.688		
1977–78	ECAC 3	2	1	1	0	.500	T–10th	15	5	10	0	.333		
1978–79	ECAC 3	11	2	9	0	.182	20th	14	4	10	0	.286		
1979–80	ECAC 3	6	2	4	0	.333	17th	13	5	7	1	.423		
1980–81	ECAC 3	5	0	5	0	.000	T–25th	18	9	9	0	.500		
Program suspended
Kris Kollevol (1982–1985)
1982–83	Independent	–	–	–	–	–	–	18	5	13	0	.278		
1983–84	ECAC 3	9	1	8	0	.111	26th	16	5	11	0	.313		
1984–85	ECAC 3	14	5	9	0	.357	19th	19	8	11	0	.421		
Bob Beck (1985–1986)
1985–86	ECAC North/South	16	4	12	0	.250	22nd	17	4	13	0	.235		
Program suspended
Totals								GP	W	L	T	%	Championships	
Regular Season								342	148	186	8	.444		
Conference Post-season								2	2	0	0	1.000		
NCAA Post-season								0	0	0	0	–		
Regular Season and Post-season Record								344	150	186	8	.448		
