= 1895–96 Yale Bulldogs men's ice hockey season =

College ice hockey season

Record
- Overall: 2–1–1
- Road: 2–1–1

Coaches and captains
- Captain: Malcolm Chace

The 1895–96 Yale Bulldogs men's ice hockey season was the first season of play for the program.

== Season ==
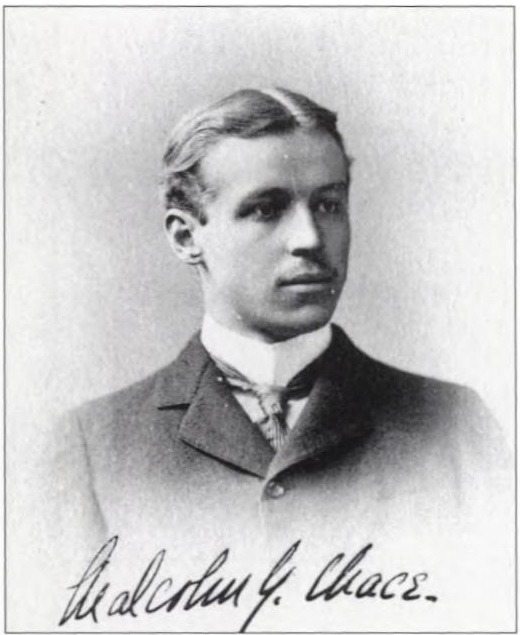
Malcolm Greene Chace

Yale can trace its ice hockey history back to 1893, however, it wasn't until 1895 that they played their first intercollegiate match. Malcolm Chace, who was also a nationally ranked tennis player, founded the Yale men's team in his senior year, serving as both captain and manager of the club.

As there were no on-campus facilities capable of supporting an ice rink the team played all of their games on the road. Because there was no governing body overseeing the structure of the season, all games played by Yale are counted for their historical record.

== Roster ==
No.	Nat.	Player	Class	Pos	Height	Weight	DoB	Hometown	Previous team
	(United States)	Amos Barnes	Junior				1875-06-05	New Haven, Connecticut
		William Barnett	Sophomore	F			1876-09-26
	(United States)	Malcolm Chace (C)	Senior				1875-03-12	Central Falls, Rhode Island
	(United States)	Arthur Foote	Senior				1874-01-03	New Haven, Connecticut
	(United States)	John Hall	Sophomore	D			1877-09-16	Pittsburgh, Pennsylvania
	(United States)	Henry Ryder	Senior				1875-02-04	Plainfield, New Jersey

== Standings ==
1895–96 Collegiate ice hockey standings
	Intercollegiate							Overall					
	GP	W	L	T	PTS	GF	GA	GP	W	L	T	GF	GA
Yale	2	1	0	1	3	4	3	4	2	1	1	9	7
Johns Hopkins	2	0	1	1	1	3	4	9	2	4	3	–	–

== Schedule and results ==
Date	Opponent	Site	Result	Record
Regular season
January 31	at Baltimore Athletic Club*	North Avenue Ice Palace • Baltimore, Maryland	L 2–3	0–1–0
February 1	at Johns Hopkins*	North Avenue Ice Palace • Baltimore, Maryland	T 2–2 ^{OT}	0–1–1
February 14	at Johns Hopkins*	North Avenue Ice Palace • Baltimore, Maryland	W 2–1	1–1–1
February 15	at Baltimore Athletic Club*	North Avenue Ice Palace • Baltimore, Maryland	W 3–1	2–1–1
*Non-conference game.
