= 1976–77 NCAA Division II men's ice hockey season =

- Duration: November 1976– March, 1977
- NCAA tournament: 1977

The 1976–77 NCAA Division II men's ice hockey season began in November 1976 and concluded in March 1977. This was the 13th season of second-tier college ice hockey.

== Regular season ==
=== Season tournaments ===
Tournament	Dates	Teams	Champion
Oswego Invitational	November 13–14	4	Oswego State
Skate 3 Tournament	November 24–25	4	Merrimack
Pilgrim Hockey Festival	November 27–28	4	Holy Cross
Elmira Tournament	December 4–5	4	Elmira
Codfish Bowl	December 28–29	4	Lowell
Salem State Tournament	January 8–9	4	Salem State
Wesleyan Invitational	January 18, 20	4	

=== Standings ===
1976–77 ECAC 2 standings
	Conference							Overall					
	GP	W	L	T	Pct.	GF	GA	GP	W	L	T	GF	GA
East Region
Merrimack * †	23	20	2	1	.891	123	51	35	23	11	1	175	114
Bowdoin	15	13	2	0	.867	102	47	23	16	7	0		
Salem State	22	16	6	0	.727	107	78	27	22	5	0		
Lowell	25	16	8	1	.660	111	84	27	17	9	1	117	92
New Haven	15	7	6	2	.533	56	58	24	16	6	2		
Holy Cross	22	10	12	0	.455	97	88	27	15	12	0	145	100
Saint Anselm	20	8	11	1	.425	87	88	21	8	12	1	88	95
Bryant	17	7	10	0	.412	69	107	30	17	13	0		
Bridgewater State	14	4	10	0	.286	50	81	22	11	11	0		
Babson	18	4	12	2	.278	46	63	22	8	12	2	78	72
Connecticut	20	5	14	1	.275	65	75	24	8	14	2	103	107
Boston State	22	6	16	0	.273	75	115	28	10	18	0		
Colby	21	5	16	0	.238	51	113	24	8	16	0		
New England College	17	4	13	0	.235	45	97	23	8	15	0		
West Region
Union †	12	11	1	0	.917	106	39	26	22	3	1		
Elmira	21	19	2	0	.905	154	57	25	22	3	0	180	67
Army	17	14	2	1	.853	111	51	29	22	6	1	202	101
American International	19	14	5	0	.737	113	70	24	18	6	0		
Middlebury	16	11	4	1	.719	91	56	22	15	6	1		
Buffalo	15	11	4	0	.733	113	54	25	14	11	0		
Hamilton	16	10	6	0	.625	101	73	21	15	5	1		
Oswego State	23	14	9	0	.609	97	109	25	13	12	0	106	121
Norwich	23	11	12	0	.478	111	115	25	12	13	0	123	131
Cortland State	17	8	9	0	.471	88	100						
Massachusetts	20	8	11	1	.425	69	92	22	8	13	1	72	107
North Adams State	17	6	10	1	.382	75	95	26	14	11	1		
Plattsburgh State	18	5	13	0	.278	55	132	23	9	14	0	85	144
Brockport State	12	3	9	0	.250	43	76	20	8	12	0	89	121
Williams	17	4	13	0	.235	58	96	22	9	13	0		
Potsdam State	13	1	12	0	.077	25	82	22	5	17	0		
Geneseo State	6	0	6	0	.000	22	48	28	17	9	2		
Championship: March 16, 1977 † indicates conference regular season champion * indicates conference tournament champion

1976–77 NCAA Division II Independent ice hockey standings
	Overall record					
	GP	W	L	T	GF	GA
Chicago State						
Hillsdale						
Illinois-Chicago	26	14	12	0		
Lake Forest	24	12	12	0	122	110
Mankato State	28	17	10	1	150	118
Oberlin						
St. Cloud State	24	10	13	1	125	133

1976–77 Minnesota Intercollegiate Athletic Conference ice hockey standings
	Conference							Overall					
	GP	W	L	T	Pts	GF	GA	GP	W	L	T	GF	GA
Gustavus Adolphus †	14	12	2	0	24			24	19	4	1		
Augsburg †	14	12	2	0	24			27	19	7	1		
Concordia (MN)	14	8	5	1	17			24	13	19	1		
St. Thomas	14	8	6	0	16			24	8	16	0		
Saint John's	14	6	7	1	13			22	7	14	1		
Hamline	14	6	8	0	12								
Saint Mary's	14	3	11	0	6			23	4	19	0		
St. Olaf	14	0	14	0	0			20	1	19	0		
† indicates conference regular season champion

== Drafted players ==
Round	Pick	Player	College	Conference	NHL team
15	183	John Costello	Lowell	ECAC 2	Montreal Canadiens

† incoming freshman

== See also ==
- 1976–77 NCAA Division I men's ice hockey season
- 1976–77 NCAA Division III men's ice hockey season
