= 1894–95 United States collegiate men's ice hockey season =

- Duration: November 1894– February 1895

The 1894–95 United States collegiate men's ice hockey season was the first scholastic year in which an organized college team played ice hockey.

Johns Hopkins University was the only active college team, playing in an amateur league among 3 other Baltimore-area clubs. All games were played at the North Avenue Ice Palace, one of the first artificial ice rinks in the United States.

== Regular season ==
=== Standings ===
1894–95 Collegiate ice hockey standings
	Overall record					
	GP	W	L	T	GF	GA
Johns Hopkins	6	2	3	1	19	14
