= 1895–96 United States collegiate men's ice hockey season =

- Duration: January 1896– February 1896

The 1895–96 United States collegiate men's ice hockey season was the 2nd season of play for collegiate ice hockey in the United States and the first scholastic year in which two organized college teams played against one another.

Johns Hopkins University and Yale University competed in two February games, marking the beginning of intercollegiate ice hockey in the United States.

== Regular season ==
=== Standings ===
1895–96 Collegiate ice hockey standings
	Intercollegiate							Overall					
	GP	W	L	T	PTS	GF	GA	GP	W	L	T	GF	GA
Yale	2	1	0	1	3	4	3	4	2	1	1	9	7
Johns Hopkins	2	0	1	1	1	3	4	9	2	4	3	–	–
