= 1973–74 NCAA Division II men's ice hockey season =

- Duration: November 1973– March, 1974
- NCAA tournament: 1974

The 1973–74 NCAA Division II men's ice hockey season began in November 1973 and concluded in March 1974. This was the 10th season of second-tier college ice hockey.

In 1973 the NCAA changed to a numerical classification system. As a result, the College division of ice hockey was split into Division II and Division III.

== Regular season ==
=== Season tournaments ===
Tournament	Dates	Teams	Champion
Bishop's University Tournament	November 17–18	4	Merrimack
Billerica Forum Thanksgiving Tournament	November 22–24	4	Boston State
American International Tournament	December 21–22	4	
Codfish Bowl		4	Salem State
Merrimack Christmas Tournament	December 28–29	4	Merrimack
Wesleyan Invitational	January 11–12	4	Connecticut
Lake Forest Tournament	February 22–23	4	Saint Mary's

=== Standings ===
1973–74 Central Collegiate Hockey Association Division II standings
	Conference							Overall					
	GP	W	L	T	PTS	GF	GA	GP	W	L	T	GF	GA
Western Michigan†	8	5	2	1	11	45	23	30	22	7	1		
Buffalo								30	18	11	1		
Lake Forest								30	9	21	0	90	175
12/7: Western Michigan - Lake Forest 10:2 12/8: Western Michigan - Lake Forest 6:1 1/5: Buffalo - Lake Forest 12:2 1/11: Western Michigan - Buffalo 7:5 1/12: Western Michigan - Buffalo 5:1 1/25: Western Michigan - Lake Forest 6:4 1/26: Lake Forest - Western Michigan 5:4 OT 3/1: Buffalo - Western Michigan 4:2 3/2: Buffalo - Western Michigan 3:3 OT Western Michigan qualified for the CCHA Championship † indicates conference regular season champion

1973–74 ECAC 2 standings
	Conference							Overall					
	GP	W	L	T	Pct.	GF	GA	GP	W	L	T	GF	GA
Vermont †*	16	15	1	0	.938	95	40	33	28	5	0	181	90
Salem State	21	18	3	0	.857	137	78	24	21	3	0		
Buffalo	7	6	1	0	.857	57	29	30	18	11	1		
Army	11	9	2	0	.818	72	41	28	20	7	1	170	114
Merrimack	24	16	6	2	.708	137	61	36	21	13	2	194	124
Massachusetts	16	10	6	0	.625	74	59	23	10	12	1	95	115
Hamilton	13	8	5	0	.615	52	54	21	14	7	0		
Saint Anselm	20	12	8	0	.600	116	74	23	12	11	0	126	93
Boston State	24	13	9	2	.583	119	104	31	18	11	2		
Williams	14	7	5	2	.571	53	49	21	13	6	2		
Norwich	19	10	8	1	.553	80	79	24	13	9	2	115	99
Oswego State	11	6	5	0	.545	51	51	25	14	11	0	122	120
Connecticut	16	7	9	0	.438	72	82	25	15	10	0	140	113
Bowdoin	14	6	8	0	.429	60	53	22	8	14	0		
Lowell Tech	20	7	12	1	.375	83	89	22	9	12	1	96	93
American International	27	9	17	1	.352	103	132	29	9	18	1		
New England College	12	4	8	0	.333	43	56	22	11	11	0		
Bridgewater State	10	3	7	0	.300	28	68	22	10	12	0		
Middlebury	15	3	12	0	.200	33	47	21	7	14	0		
New Haven	16	3	13	0	.188	42	125	24	8	16	0		
Holy Cross	12	2	10	0	.167	38	93	23	11	12	0	122	121
Babson	12	2	10	0	.167	30	71	19	8	10	1		
Colby	14	1	12	1	.107	42	81	19	3	15	1		
Championship: March 9, 1974 † indicates conference regular season champion * indicates conference tournament champion

1973–74 NCAA Division II Independent ice hockey standings
	Overall record					
	GP	W	L	T	GF	GA
Alaska–Fairbanks	8	1	7	0	-	-
Brockport State	22	15	7	0	141	92
Chicago State						
Hillsdale						
Illinois-Chicago	24	17	5	2		
Mankato State	21	9	11	1	98	92
Oberlin						
St. Cloud State	22	14	6	2	132	74
St. Olaf	20	6	14	0	–	–

1973–74 Minnesota Intercollegiate Athletic Conference ice hockey standings
	Conference							Overall					
	GP	W	L	T	Pts	GF	GA	GP	W	L	T	GF	GA
St. Thomas†	14	13	1	0	26			21	18	3	0		
Gustavus Adolphus	14	12	2	0	24			25	20	5	0		
Concordia (MN)	14	10	4	0	20			21	17	4	0		
Augsburg	14	9	5	0	18			22	10	12	0		
Saint Mary's	14	6	8	0	12			22	8	14	0		
Hamline	14	3	11	0	6			20	6	14	0		
Saint John's	14	3	11	0	6			19	5	14	0		
Macalester	14	0	14	0	0			22	0	22	0		
† indicates conference regular season champion

== Drafted players ==
Round	Pick	Player	College	Conference	NHL team
7	111	Tom Anderson ^{†}	Mankato State	Independent	California Golden Seals

† incoming freshman

== See also ==
- 1973–74 NCAA Division I men's ice hockey season
- 1973–74 NCAA Division III men's ice hockey season
