= 1973–74 NCAA Division III men's ice hockey season =

- Duration: November 1973– March 1974
- NCAA tournament: 1974

The 1973–74 NCAA Division III men's ice hockey season began in November 1973 and concluded in March 1974. This was the 1st season of Division III college ice hockey.

== Regular season ==
=== Standings ===
1973–74 ECAC 3 standings
	Conference							Overall					
	GP	W	L	T	Pct.	GF	GA	GP	W	L	T	GF	GA
Worcester State †*	9	8	0	1	.944	74	37	22	14	7	1		
Ithaca	4	3	1	0	.750	22	11	15	5	10	0		
Wesleyan	7	5	2	0	.714	58	21	23	10	12	1	116	106
Brockport	3	2	1	0	.667	19	13	9	4	5	0		
Framingham State	13	8	4	1	.654	86	61	25	14	10	1		
Nasson	11	7	4	0	.636	44	34	20	11	9	0		
North Adams State	8	4	3	1	.563	53	32	15	7	7	1		
Bryant	9	5	4	0	.556	49	44	12	7	5	0		
Plymouth State	8	4	4	0	.500	37	35	14	7	7	0		
Assumption	4	2	2	0	.500	15	18	17	8	8	1	87	82
Amherst	2	1	1	0	.500	4	6	17	9	7	1		
Nichols	11	4	6	1	.409	42	58	19	5	13	1	71	122
RIT	6	2	4	0	.333	22	34	24	11	13	0	123	109
Maine at Portland–Gorham	9	2	6	1	.278	27	52	16	5	10	1	74	104
Bentley	4	1	3	0	.250	13	19	5	1	4	0		
Fitchburg State	7	1	6	0	.143	25	59	12	2	10	0		
Lehigh	1	0	1	0	.000	2	7	17	10	5	2		
MIT	7	0	7	0	.000	11	62	15	0	15	0		
Championship: March 2, 1974 † indicates conference regular season champion * indicates conference tournament champion

1973–74 NCAA Division III Independent ice hockey standings
	Overall record					
	GP	W	L	T	GF	GA
Iona	22	16	6	0		

== See also ==
- 1973–74 NCAA Division I men's ice hockey season
- 1973–74 NCAA Division II men's ice hockey season
