= 1975–76 NCAA Division II men's ice hockey season =

- Duration: November 1975– March, 1976
- NCAA tournament: 1976

The 1975–76 NCAA Division II men's ice hockey season began in November 1975 and concluded in March 1976. This was the 12th season of second-tier college ice hockey.

== Regular season ==
=== Season tournaments ===
Tournament	Dates	Teams	Champion
Lowell Thanksgiving Tournament	November 28–29	4	Merrimack
Brockport Tournament	December 5–6	4	Ithaca
Elmira Tournament	December 6–7	4	Oswego State
Codfish Bowl	December 27–28	4	Merrimack
Williams Invitational	January 2–3	4	
Merrimack Invitational	January 3–4	4	Salem State
Wesleyan Invitational	January 15, 17	4	
Winter Carnival Tournament	February 27–28	4	Plattsburgh State

=== Standings ===
1975–76 ECAC 2 standings
	Conference							Overall					
	GP	W	L	T	Pct.	GF	GA	GP	W	L	T	GF	GA
Union	14	13	1	0	.929	106	41	23	19	4	0		
Merrimack †	23	21	2	0	.913	157	62	31	24	7	0	196	111
Bowdoin *	16	13	3	0	.813	107	66	27	18	9	0		
Salem State	20	15	5	0	.750	108	54	27	21	6	0		
Army	17	12	5	0	.706	108	57	28	18	9	1	161	101
Buffalo	14	9	4	1	.679	84	67	28	11	16	1		
Oswego State	20	13	6	1	.675	131	75	26	18	7	1	169	101
American International	22	14	8	0	.636	124	103	24	16	8	0		
Massachusetts	20	12	8	0	.600	89	86	25	12	13	0	108	132
Hamilton	17	9	7	1	.559	98	76	22	12	9	1		
Norwich	20	10	9	1	.525	100	103	24	12	11	1	119	127
Lowell	22	11	10	1	.523	116	97	22	11	10	1	116	97
Boston State	24	12	11	1	.521	91	99	31	17	13	1		
Williams	17	8	8	1	.500	90	86	21	12	8	1		
New Haven	15	7	7	1	.500	58	68	22	13	8	1		
Saint Anselm	23	11	12	0	.478	115	113	24	11	13	0	116	122
Middlebury	15	7	8	0	.467	74	79	23	12	11	0		
Bryant	11	5	6	0	.455	47	56	24	14	10	0		
Brockport	11	5	6	0	.455	43	73	20	10	9	1		
Connecticut	19	7	11	1	.395	81	79	24	12	11	1	91	102
Holy Cross	18	7	11	0	.389	77	78	25	14	11	0	121	92
North Adams State	12	3	9	0	.250	36	65	21	11	10	0		
Ithaca	13	3	10	0	.231	49	79	19	8	11	0		
New England College	18	4	14	0	.222	40	106	23	6	16	1		
Colby	19	3	16	0	.158	54	127	22	4	18	0		
Bridgewater State	14	1	12	2	.133	44	84	22	6	13	3		
Babson	16	2	14	0	.125	42	90	21	5	16	0	62	97
Elmira	16	1	14	1	.094	51	91	26	10	15	1		
Championship: March 13, 1976 † indicates conference regular season champion * indicates conference tournament champion

1975–76 NCAA Division II Independent ice hockey standings
	Overall record					
	GP	W	L	T	GF	GA
Brockport State	23	13	9	1	115	125
Chicago State						
Elmira	31	10	20	1	134	161
Geneseo State	26	18	7	1		
Hillsdale						
Illinois-Chicago	29	17	11	1		
Lake Forest	28	13	15	0	143	170
Mankato State	32	20	11	1	152	124
Oberlin						
Plattsburgh State	26	14	11	1		
St. Cloud State	24	9	14	1	95	119

1975–76 Minnesota Intercollegiate Athletic Conference ice hockey standings
	Conference							Overall					
	GP	W	L	T	Pts	GF	GA	GP	W	L	T	GF	GA
Gustavus Adolphus †	14	13	1	0	26	115	50	27	23	4	0	206	98
Augsburg	14	10	4	0	20	105	52	24	12	12	0	134	113
St. Thomas	14	8	5	1	17	83	61	24	14	9	1	133	104
Concordia (MN)	14	8	5	1	17	84	51	24	13	10	1	132	100
Saint John's	14	7	7	0	14	76	67	26	9	17	0	123	130
Hamline	14	6	8	0	12	58	72	22	8	14	0	84	101
Saint Mary's	14	2	12	0	4	57	110	22	5	16	1	94	116
St. Olaf	14	1	13	0	2	17	93	18	1	17	0	24	143
† indicates conference regular season champion

== See also ==
- 1975–76 NCAA Division I men's ice hockey season
- 1975–76 NCAA Division III men's ice hockey season
