= 1972–73 NCAA College Division men's ice hockey season =

- Duration: November 1972– March, 1973
- NCAA tournament: 1973

The 1972–73 NCAA College Division men's ice hockey season began in November 1972 and concluded in March of the following year. This was the 9th season of second-tier college ice hockey.

== Regular season ==
=== Season tournaments ===
Tournament	Dates	Teams	Champion
North County Thanksgiving Festival	November 23–25	4	Clarkson
Lowell Thanksgiving Tournament	November 23, 26	4	Merrimack
Merrimack Christmas Tournament	December 15–16	4	Merrimack
ECAC Christmas Tournament	December 19–20	4	Dartmouth
Codfish Bowl		4	Saint Anselm
Williams Tournament	December 28–30	4	Williams
Nichols School Invitational	December 29–30	4	St. Lawrence

=== Standings ===
1972–73 ECAC 2 standings
	Conference							Overall					
	GP	W	L	T	Pct.	GF	GA	GP	W	L	T	GF	GA
Vermont †*	16	16	0	0	1.000	127	34	31	24	7	0	190	91
Oswego State	17	13	2	2	.824	98	66	25	18	5	2	144	108
Saint Anselm	19	15	4	0	.789	111	51	23	16	7	0	125	72
Williams	19	14	5	0	.737	121	65	23	16	7	0		
Massachusetts	18	12	4	2	.722	103	58	27	14	11	2	141	105
Bowdoin	16	11	4	1	.719	81	56	24	14	8	2		
Merrimack	19	13	5	1	.711	100	63	32	18	12	2	150	131
Norwich	19	11	6	2	.632	94	76	26	13	11	2	129	111
Bentley	7	4	3	0	.571	47	35						
Babson	16	9	7	0	.563	79	62	17	10	7	0		
Middlebury	16	9	7	0	.563	60	60	23	11	11	1		
Lowell Tech	21	11	9	1	.548	92	75	23	12	10	1	97	81
Buffalo	13	7	6	0	.538	75	66	22	10	12	0		
Salem State	19	10	9	0	.526	91	90						
Boston State	21	11	10	0	.524	119	95	26	13	13	0		
Connecticut	22	11	11	0	.500	111	106	24	12	12	0	118	114
Bridgewater State	17	8	9	0	.471	110	85	17	8	9	0		
Holy Cross	21	9	12	0	.429	112	124	23	11	12	0	132	135
American International	21	8	11	2	.429	96	123	25	9	14	2		
New England College	19	8	11	0	.421	71	78	20	9	11	0		
New Haven	19	7	12	0	.368	71	98						
Ithaca	15	5	10	0	.333	60	68						
Hamilton	19	6	13	0	.316	72	108	22	7	15	0		
Plymouth State	5	1	3	1	.300	15	23	6	2	3	1		
Colby	21	4	16	1	.214	65	114	23	4	18	1		
Amherst	17	3	14	0	.176	71	107						
Championship: March 10, 1973 † indicates conference regular season champion * indicates conference tournament champion

1972–73 ECAC 3 standings
	Conference							Overall					
	GP	W	L	T	Pct.	GF	GA	GP	W	L	T	GF	GA
Framingham State †	13	12	1	0	.923	104	29	29	24	5	0		
Worcester State *	21	12	9	0	.571	133	115	23	13	10	0		
Nasson	7	3	3	1	.500	24	27	13	6	5	2		
Nichols	15	7	8	0	.467	96	87	19	10	9	0	127	92
Wesleyan	18	7	11	0	.389	104	99	21	10	11	0	126	109
North Adams State	7	2	5	0	.286	23	36	17	10	6	1		
MIT	13	3	10	0	.231	46	122	17	5	12	0		
Amherst	17	3	14	0	.176	71	107	18	4	14	0		
RIT	8	1	7	0	.125	28	54	25	14	10	1	145	109
Maine at Portland–Gorham	10	0	10	0	.000	20	112	13	1	12	0	30	138
Assumption	10	0	10	0	.000	18	118	18	1	17	0		
Lehigh	6	0	6	0	.000	10	69	19	8	11	0		
Championship: March 8, 1973 † indicates conference regular season champion * indicates conference tournament champion

1972–73 NCAA College Division Independent ice hockey standings
	Overall record					
	GP	W	L	T	GF	GA
Alaska Methodist						
Chicago State						
Hillsdale						
Illinois-Chicago	22	11	11	0		
Iona	16	10	5	1		
Lake Forest	36	19	17	0	206	157
Mankato State	20	14	4	2	112	64
Oberlin						
Plymouth State	11	5	5	1		
St. Cloud State	20	8	12	0	75	89
St. Olaf	19	7	12	0	–	–

1972–73 Minnesota Intercollegiate Athletic Conference ice hockey standings
	Conference							Overall					
	GP	W	L	T	Pts	GF	GA	GP	W	L	T	GF	GA
Gustavus Adolphus †	14	14	0	0	24			24	18	6	0		
Augsburg	14	11	3	0	26			25	14	11	0		
Saint Mary's	14	11	3	0	26			20	17	3	0		
Concordia (MN)	14	7	7	0	14			22	9	13	0		
St. Thomas	14	7	7	0	14			22	9	12	1		
Hamline	14	3	11	0	6								
Saint John's	14	2	12	0	4			22	5	17	0		
Macalester	14	1	13	0	2								
† indicates conference regular season champion

== See also ==
- 1972–73 NCAA University Division men's ice hockey season
