= 1974–75 NCAA Division II men's ice hockey season =

- Duration: November 1974– March, 1975
- NCAA tournament: 1975

The 1974–75 NCAA Division II men's ice hockey season began in November 1974 and concluded in March 1975. This was the 11th season of second-tier college ice hockey.

== Regular season ==
=== Season tournaments ===
Tournament	Dates	Teams	Champion
Lowell Thanksgiving Tournament	November 28, 30	4	Merrimack
Elmira Tournament	December 21–22	4	Hamilton
Codfish Bowl	December 28–29	4	Salem State
Merrimack Invitational	January 4–5	4	Merrimack
Wesleyan Invitational	January 10–11	4	Connecticut

=== Standings ===
1974–75 Central Collegiate Hockey Association Division II standings
	Conference							Overall					
	GP	W	L	T	PTS	GF	GA	GP	W	L	T	GF	GA
Western Michigan†	8	8	0	0	16	76	26	27	19	8	0		
Buffalo	6	2	4	0	4	36	34	30	11	18	1		
Lake Forest	6	0	6	0	0	17	69	30	10	20	0	119	197
Western Michigan qualified for the CCHA Championship † indicates conference regular season champion

1974–75 ECAC 2 standings
	Conference							Overall					
	GP	W	L	T	Pct.	GF	GA	GP	W	L	T	GF	GA
Merrimack †	25	22	2	1	.900	176	78	32	23	8	1	200	116
Hamilton	19	13	5	1	.711	99	79	26	17	8	1		
Middlebury	15	10	4	1	.700	81	58	23	15	7	1		
Bowdoin *	16	11	5	0	.688	87	72	23	14	9	0		
Salem State	22	15	7	0	.682	111	81	26	19	7	0		
Army	19	12	7	0	.632	99	74	29	18	11	0	169	119
Lowell Tech	21	13	8	0	.619	89	74	22	14	8	0	113	73
Oswego State	17	10	6	1	.618	92	75	24	15	8	1	136	104
Saint Anselm	22	12	9	1	.568	144	88	24	13	10	1	147	97
Connecticut	18	9	8	1	.528	76	80	26	15	10	1	136	118
American International	22	11	11	0	.500	116	99	26	14	12	0		
Massachusetts	19	9	9	1	.500	90	86	25	10	14	1	108	131
Buffalo	15	7	7	1	.500	84	66	30	11	18	1		
Elmira	13	6	6	1	.500	54	54	20	12	6	2		
Norwich	19	9	10	0	.474	98	112	27	13	14	0	148	169
Williams	17	8	9	0	.471	74	82	21	12	9	0		
Ithaca	13	5	7	1	.423	55	61	16	8	7	1		
Boston State	22	7	15	0	.318	80	132	30	13	17	0		
Holy Cross	11	3	8	0	.273	42	75	21	11	10	0	109	106
Bridgewater State	11	3	8	0	.273	30	73	21	10	11	0		
Babson	12	3	9	0	.250	44	70	19	9	10	0		
New England College	12	3	9	0	.250	50	100	21	7	14	0		
Colby	17	3	12	2	.235	64	93	21	5	14	2		
Brockport	8	1	7	0	.125	21	39	22	12	10	0		
New Haven	17	1	16	0	.059	52	137	26	5	21	0		
Championship: March 8, 1975 † indicates conference regular season champion * indicates conference tournament champion

1974–75 NCAA Division II Independent ice hockey standings
	Overall record					
	GP	W	L	T	GF	GA
Brockport State	20	11	9	0	115	68
Chicago State						
Elmira	21	12	7	2	114	79
Hillsdale						
Illinois-Chicago	22	12	10	0		
Mankato State	22	14	8	0	126	93
North Adams State	21	13	8	0		
Oberlin						
St. Cloud State	25	16	9	0	162	129

1974–75 Minnesota Intercollegiate Athletic Conference ice hockey standings
	Conference							Overall					
	GP	W	L	T	Pts	GF	GA	GP	W	L	T	GF	GA
Gustavus Adolphus †	16	15	1	0	30			27	23	4	0		
Augsburg	16	13	3	0	26			27	18	9	0		
St. Thomas	16	12	4	0	24			27	19	8	0		
Concordia (MN)	16	11	5	0	22			24	13	11	0		
Saint John's	16	8	8	0	16			24	10	14	0		
Saint Mary's	16	7	9	0	14			26	7	19	0		
St. Olaf	16	3	13	0	6			24	3	21	0		
Hamline	16	2	14	0	4								
Macalester	16	1	15	0	2								
† indicates conference regular season champion

== See also ==
- 1974–75 NCAA Division I men's ice hockey season
- 1974–75 NCAA Division III men's ice hockey season
