= Fairfield Stags men's ice hockey =

- University: Fairfield University
- Conference: MAAC
- Head coach: N/A
- Arena: Total Mortgage Arena; Fairfield, Connecticut
- Colors: Red

The Fairfield Stags Men's Ice Hockey was an NCAA Division I ice hockey team that played in the MAAC for five seasons.

== History ==
Fairfield's hockey program was elevated to Division III status in 1974 and found immediate success with a 19-7-1 mark under head coach John McCarthy. Despite being a D-I school, the Stags competed in ECAC's lower classification. McCarthy retired after the 1995-96 season and was replaced by Peter LaVigne who then stepped down after only one season. Mike Doneghey succeeded Lavigne and in Doneghey's first year Fairfield was ruled ineligible to play in ECAC's North/Central/South postseason after offering athletic scholarships, a violation of D-III rules. Fairfield had offered the scholarships because they were joining the newly formed Metro Atlantic Athletic Conference (MAAC) ice hockey conference which was to begin play in 1998-99. In their first year as a full D-I program Fairfield finished with one of the all-time worst records, going 1-31 over the course of the season and allowed an average of more than 7 goals per game. After the worst record in team history Doneghey was promptly replaced with Mark Dennehy and, though there was improvement, Dennehy himself left after a 3-28-3 season to become an assistant at Massachusetts. Jim Hunt assumed the reins for the 2000-01 season and saw to a resurgence in Fairfield's fortunes with an 11-win season, but the next two years saw diminishing returns with 6 and 8 wins.

Hunt was not able to push the Stags any further due to the University dropping the ice hockey program to club status after the 2002-03 season. The move came as a cost-cutting measure that also claimed Fairfield's football program. In five season as a D-I school, Fairfield finished last in their conference three times, made two conference tournaments and lost both of its playoffs games by a combined score of 23-7.

Today the Stags Men's Ice Hockey Team is a member of the ACHA and competes in the D3 division. Under new head coach Mike Silva, the team has seen an Empire Conference Championship in 2015 and three consecutive Regional Championships that vaulted the team into contention for the national title. In 2015 the team achieved a record of 0-3-0 on the national stage, yet still finished ranked 14th in the country. In 2016 the team achieved a record of 1-1-1 at nationals nearly qualifying for the semi-finals, ultimately the team finished 7th in the country that year. In 2017 the team earned a record of 1-2-0 and finished 12th in the country.

== Season-by-season records ==
Season	Division	Conference	Record	Pct.	Position	Conference Tournament	Coach
1974–75	Division III	ECAC 3	19–7–1	.722	T–9th	None	John McCarthy
1975–76	Division III	ECAC 3	13–11–1	.540	7th	None	John McCarthy
1976–77	Division III	ECAC 3	11–11–0	.500	6th	None	John McCarthy
1977–78	Division III	ECAC 3	8–12–1	.405	9th	None	John McCarthy
1978–79	Division III	ECAC 3	7–16–0	.304	14th	None	John McCarthy
1979–80	Division III	ECAC 3	13–13–0	.500	11th	None	John McCarthy
1980–81	Division III	ECAC 3	14–9–1	.604	8th	None	John McCarthy
1981–82	Division III	ECAC 3	9–14–1	.396	T–9th	None	John McCarthy
1982–83	Division III	ECAC 3	10–13–0	.435	13th	None	John McCarthy
1983–84	Division III	ECAC 3	8–13–3	.396	17th	None	John McCarthy
1984–85	Division III	ECAC 3	5–19–0	.208	24th	None	John McCarthy
1985–86	Division III	ECAC North/South	5–19–1	.220	26th	None	John McCarthy
1986–87	Division III	ECAC North/South	7–17–0	.292	T–20th	None	John McCarthy
1987–88	Division III	ECAC North/South	6–19–1	.250	28th	None	John McCarthy
1988–89	Division III	ECAC North/South	5–21–0	.192	22nd	None	John McCarthy
1989–90	Division III	ECAC North/South	9–12–2	.435	16th	None	John McCarthy
1990–91	Division III	ECAC North/South	12–11–2	.520	14th	None	John McCarthy
1991–92	Division III	ECAC North/South	16–12–0	.571	8th	Division Semifinals	John McCarthy
1992–93	Division III	ECAC South	10–10–0	.500	2nd	None	John McCarthy
1993–94	Division III	ECAC South	14–6–1	.690	2nd	None	John McCarthy
1994–95	Division III	ECAC South	18–9–0	.667	2nd	Quarterfinals	John McCarthy
1995–96	Division III	ECAC South	11–13–4	.464	2nd	None	John McCarthy
1996–97	Division III	ECAC South	13–12–1	.519	3rd	None	Peter LaVigne
1997–98	Division III	ECAC South	12–12–0	.500	N/A	N/A	Mike Doneghey
1998–99	Division I	MAAC	1–31–0	.031	8th	Quarterfinals	Mike Doneghey
1999–00	Division I	MAAC	3–28–3	.132	10th	None	Mark Dennehy
2000–01	Division I	MAAC	11–19–2	.375	8th	Quarterfinals	Jim Hunt
2001–02	Division I	MAAC	6–23–2	.234	10th	None	Jim Hunt
2002–03	Division I	MAAC	8–23–2	.273	11th	None	Jim Hunt
29 seasons	–	–	284–435–30	.399	–	–	5 coaches

== All-time coaching records ==
Tenure	Coach	Years	Record	Pct.
1974–1996	John McCarthy	22	230–287–19	.447
1996–1997	Peter LaVigne	1	13–12–1	.519
1997–1999	Mike Doneghey	2	13–43–0	.232
1999–2000	Mark Dennehy	1	3–28–3	.132
2000–2003	Jim Hunt	3	25–65–7	.293
Totals	5 coaches	29 seasons	284–435–30	.399
