= 1974–75 NCAA Division III men's ice hockey season =

- Duration: November 1974– March 1975
- NCAA tournament: 1975

The 1974–75 NCAA Division III men's ice hockey season began in November 1974 and concluded in March 1975. This was the 2nd season of Division III college ice hockey.

== Regular season ==
=== Standings ===
1974–75 ECAC 3 standings
	Conference							Overall					
	GP	W	L	T	Pct.	GF	GA	GP	W	L	T	GF	GA
RIT	1	1	0	0	1.000	4	0	24	9	15	0	112	156
North Adams State	13	11	2	0	.846	97	43	21	13	8	0		
Bryant	12	10	2	0	.833	66	36	20	14	6	0		
Worcester State	11	8	3	0	.727	96	41	22	14	7	1		
Trinity	12	8	4	0	.667	73	41	17	9	8	0	104	77
Amherst	6	4	2	0	.667	45	26	21	6	15	0		
Framingham State	14	8	6	0	.571	99	77	27	13	14	0		
Wesleyan	9	5	4	0	.556	54	34	23	7	16	0	104	128
Fairfield	8	4	4	0	.500	34	39	27	19	7	1		
Bentley	8	4	4	0	.500	30	28	10	6	4	0		
Maine at Portland–Gorham	6	3	3	0	.500	40	28	16	9	7	0	108	71
Nichols	13	6	7	0	.462	62	76	20	10	10	0	111	117
Plymouth State	7	3	4	0	.429	20	27	15	6	9	0		
Fitchburg State	12	5	7	0	.417	65	59	19	8	11	0		
Westfield State	9	3	6	0	.333	39	81	13	5	8	0		
Assumption	10	3	7	0	.300	46	54	17	7	9	1		
Gordon	7	2	5	0	.286	16	38	20	6	13	1		
Lehigh	1	0	1	0	.000	3	6	16	10	4	2	103	68
Southeastern Massachusetts	6	0	6	0	.000	19	56	14	1	13	0		
MIT	11	0	11	0	.000	13	99	16	0	16	0		
Championship: March __, 1975 † indicates conference regular season champion * indicates conference tournament champion

1974–75 NCAA Division III Independent ice hockey standings
	Overall record					
	GP	W	L	T	GF	GA
Curry	14	10	4	0		
Iona	25	11	12	2		

== See also ==
- 1974–75 NCAA Division I men's ice hockey season
- 1974–75 NCAA Division II men's ice hockey season
