= 1976–77 NCAA Division III men's ice hockey season =

- Duration: November 1976– March 1977
- NCAA tournament: 1977

The 1976–77 NCAA Division III men's ice hockey season began in November 1976 and concluded in March 1977. This was the 4th season of Division III college ice hockey.

During the 1976–77 season, Division III men's college ice hockey programs competed in the ECAC 3 conference and as independent teams. No NCAA Division III national championship tournament was held that season; the NCAA Division III championship tournament began in 1984.

== Regular season ==
=== Standings ===
1976–77 ECAC 3 standings
	Conference							Overall					
	GP	W	L	T	Pct.	GF	GA	GP	W	L	T	GF	GA
Plymouth State	3	3	0	0	1.000	25	7	12	11	1	0		
Worcester State *	12	11	1	0	.917	100	47	25	15	10	0		
Westfield State	16	12	4	0	.750	110	65	23	14	9	0		
Iona	14	10	3	1	.750	120	56	32	26	5	1		
Trinity	14	10	4	0	.714	90	64	22	12	10	0	100	109
Framingham State	13	9	4	0	.692	93	73	28	13	15	0		
Fairfield	16	11	5	0	.688	120	71	22	11	11	0		
Lehigh	6	4	2	0	.667	45	29	16	11	5	0		
Ramapo	12	7	4	1	.625	77	50						
Amherst	7	4	3	0	.571	36	35	18	5	13	0		
Assumption	12	6	5	1	.542	51	51	22	9	11	2		
Nichols	8	3	5	0	.375	35	43	19	9	10	0	94	93
Southeastern Massachusetts	14	5	9	0	.357	65	77	11	5	6	0		
Gordon	6	2	4	0	.333	19	28						
Wesleyan	9	3	6	0	.333	38	50	23	5	17	1	82	138
Queens College	9	2	7	0	.222	41	55						
Fitchburg State	10	2	8	0	.200	43	69						
New Hampshire College	6	1	5	0	.167	17	38	20	2	17	1		
City College of New York	10	1	9	0	.100	25	79						
RIT	2	0	2	0	.000	3	20	21	5	16	0	68	144
Quinnipiac	7	0	7	0	.000	23	92	19	3	15	1	97	213
Championship: March __, 1977 † indicates conference regular season champion * indicates conference tournament champion

1976–77 NCAA Division III Independent ice hockey standings
	Overall record					
	GP	W	L	T	GF	GA
Curry	21	8	12	1		

== See also ==
- 1976–77 NCAA Division I men's ice hockey season
- 1976–77 NCAA Division II men's ice hockey season
