= 1980–81 NCAA Division III men's ice hockey season =

- Duration: November 1980– March 1981
- NCAA tournament: 1981

The 1980–81 NCAA Division III men's ice hockey season began in November 1980 and concluded in March 1981. This was the 8th season of Division III college ice hockey.

== Regular season ==
=== Standings ===
1980–81 ECAC 3 standings
	Conference							Overall					
	GP	W	L	T	Pct.	GF	GA	GP	W	L	T	GF	GA
Bentley †*	17	17	0	0	1.000	109	41	21	20	1	0	133	57
Southeastern Massachusetts	15	13	2	0	.867			22	15	7	0		
Iona	15	12	2	1	.833			20	15	4	1		
Wesleyan	15	12	3	0	.800	92	47	22	13	8	1	108	78
Hobart	11	8	3	0	.727	80	28	19	11	8	0	117	72
Fitchburg State	18	13	5	0	.722			25	17	8	0		
Upsala	7	5	2	0	.714			28	20	8	0		
Canisius	6	4	2	0	.667	42	20	27	13	12	2	132	110
Fairfield	21	13	7	1	.643			24	14	9	1		
Massachusetts–Boston	11	7	4	0	.636			24	17	7	0	138	74
Amherst	13	8	5	0	.615			22	8	14	0		
Plymouth State	9	5	3	1	.611			15	10	4	1		
Assumption	18	9	9	0	.500			21	11	10	0		
Worcester State	17	8	9	0	.471			22	9	13	0		
Connecticut College	15	7	8	0	.467			23	12	10	1		
Suffolk	13	6	7	0	.462			19	9	10	0		
Stonehill	17	7	9	1	.441			20	7	12	1		
Trinity	16	6	10	0	.375	78	76	21	7	14	0	88	104
New Hampshire College	18	5	13	0	.278			20	7	13	0		
Nichols	18	5	13	0	.278			21	7	14	0	82	123
St. John's	16	4	12	0	.250			21	5	15	1		
Gordon	7	1	6	0	.143			16	4	12	0		
Quinnipiac	15	2	13	0	.133			21	6	14	1	93	133
Ramapo	15	1	13	1	.100			20	4	15	1		
Clark	8	0	8	0	.000			15	1	13	1		
Lehigh	5	0	5	0	.000			18	9	9	0		
Championship: March , 1981 † indicates conference regular season champion * indicates conference tournament champion

1980–81 NCAA Division III Independent ice hockey standings
	Overall record					
	GP	W	L	T	GF	GA
Curry	18	7	11	0		
Western New England	15	4	10	1		

== See also ==
- 1980–81 NCAA Division I men's ice hockey season
- 1980–81 NCAA Division II men's ice hockey season
