= 1981–82 NCAA Division III men's ice hockey season =

- Duration: November 1981– March 1982
- NCAA tournament: 1982

The 1981–82 NCAA Division III men's ice hockey season began in November 1981 and concluded in March 1982. This was the 9th season of Division III college ice hockey.

== Regular season ==
=== Standings ===
1981–82 ECAC 3 standings
	Conference							Overall					
	GP	W	L	T	Pct.	GF	GA	GP	W	L	T	GF	GA
Massachusetts–Boston †*	17	16	1	0	.941	132	45	27	24	3	0	202	86
Assumption	16	14	2	0	.875			21	17	4	0		
Bentley	14	11	3	0	.786			24	14	10	0	131	99
Upsala	9	7	2	0	.778			31	24	7	0		
Amherst	14	10	3	1	.750			22	11	11	0		
Iona	15	11	4	0	.733			19	13	5	1		
Southeastern Massachusetts	15	10	5	0	.667			18	11	7	0		
Trinity	16	9	6	1	.594			21	10	10	1	103	83
New Hampshire College	20	10	10	0	.500			24	11	13	0		
Fairfield	19	9	9	1	.500			24	9	14	1		
Fitchburg State	17	8	8	1	.500			24	10	13	1		
Wesleyan	15	7	7	1	.500	46	54	20	9	10	1	56	77
Plymouth State	10	5	5	0	.500			18	9	9	0		
Hobart	8	4	4	0	.500			18	8	10	0	93	110
Canisius	4	2	2	0	.500	20	16	29	16	12	1	157	145
Connecticut College	15	7	8	1	.469			23	10	12	1		
Stonehill	20	9	11	0	.450			23	11	12	0		
Worcester State	14	5	9	0	.357			21	8	13	0		
Quinnipiac	18	5	13	0	.278	77	101	25	10	15	0	129	142
Western New England	5	1	4	0	.200			16	5	11	0		
Suffolk	17	3	14	0	.176			25	6	19	0		
Nichols	14	1	13	0	.071			19	2	17	0	46	136
St. John's	18	1	17	0	.056			20	3	17	0		
Championship: March 6, 1982 † indicates conference regular season champion * indicates conference tournament champion

1981–82 NCAA Division III Independent ice hockey standings
	Overall record					
	GP	W	L	T	GF	GA
Curry	20	13	6	1		

== See also ==
- 1981–82 NCAA Division I men's ice hockey season
- 1981–82 NCAA Division II men's ice hockey season
