= 1975–76 NCAA Division III men's ice hockey season =

Ice hockey season

- Duration: November 1975– March 1976
- NCAA tournament: 1976

The 1975–76 NCAA Division III men's ice hockey season began in November 1975 and concluded in March 1976. This was the 3rd season of Division III college ice hockey.

== Regular season ==
=== Standings ===
1975–76 ECAC 3 standings
	Conference							Overall					
	GP	W	L	T	Pct.	GF	GA	GP	W	L	T	GF	GA
Amherst *	7	6	0	1	.929	35	20	22	11	10	1		
Worcester State	9	8	1	0	.889	61	33	23	11	11	1		
RIT	6	5	1	0	.833	34	22	25	12	13	0	108	128
Cortland State	5	4	1	0	.800	30	18	15	5	9	1		
Framingham State	12	9	3	0	.750	76	47	27	12	14	1		
Massachusetts Maritime	8	5	3	0	.625	50	42	10	6	3	1		
Wesleyan	10	6	4	0	.600	61	40	22	7	15	0	81	124
Fairfield	13	7	5	1	.577	69	61	25	13	11	1		
Southeastern Massachusetts	10	5	5	0	.500	54	52	16	9	7	0		
Assumption	6	3	3	0	.500	36	34	20	9	9	2		
Westfield State	14	5	8	1	.393	61	58	19	5	13	1		
Trinity	11	3	7	1	.318	40	57	20	5	14	1	57	100
Lehigh	7	2	5	0	.286	31	30	18	10	7	1	105	67
Nichols	9	1	8	0	.111	30	52	21	8	13	0	104	110
Fitchburg State	9	1	8	0	.111	37	64	14	1	13	0		
Gordon	4	0	4	0	.000	9	51	16	1	15	0		
Championship: March , 1976 † indicates conference regular season champion * indicates conference tournament champion

1975–76 NCAA Division III Independent ice hockey standings
	Overall record					
	GP	W	L	T	GF	GA
Curry	19	9	8	2		
Iona	29	19	3	7		
New Hampshire College	17	5	11	1		
Quinnipiac	13	8	5	0	84	61
Plymouth State	11	6	5	0		

== See also ==
- 1975–76 NCAA Division I men's ice hockey season
- 1975–76 NCAA Division II men's ice hockey season
