= 1979–80 NCAA Division III men's ice hockey season =

- Duration: November 1979– March 1980
- NCAA tournament: 1980

The 1979–80 NCAA Division III men's ice hockey season began in November 1979 and concluded in March 1980. This was the 7th season of Division III college ice hockey.

== Regular season ==
=== Standings ===
1979–80 ECAC 3 standings
| | Conference | | | | | | | Overall | | | | | |
| | GP | W | L | T | Pct. | GF | GA | GP | W | L | T | GF | GA |
|---|---|---|---|---|---|---|---|---|---|---|---|---|---|
| Amherst | 12 | 11 | 1 | 0 | .917 | 88 | 27 | 23 | 12 | 11 | 0 | | |
| Southeastern Massachusetts | 15 | 13 | 2 | 0 | .867 | 117 | 52 | 20 | 14 | 5 | 1 | | |
| Bentley * | 16 | 13 | 3 | 0 | .813 | 140 | 55 | 21 | 15 | 6 | 0 | 159 | 85 |
| Fitchburg State | 16 | 13 | 3 | 0 | .813 | 73 | 35 | 25 | 18 | 7 | 0 | | |
| Iona | 14 | 11 | 3 | 0 | .786 | 79 | 67 | 19 | 14 | 5 | 0 | | |
| RIT | 8 | 6 | 2 | 0 | .750 | 61 | 17 | 22 | 12 | 10 | 0 | 133 | 86 |
| Wesleyan | 13 | 9 | 4 | 0 | .692 | 53 | 54 | 24 | 12 | 12 | 0 | 84 | 135 |
| Stonehill | 16 | 11 | 5 | 0 | .688 | 90 | 72 | 23 | 14 | 8 | 1 | | |
| Trinity | 14 | 8 | 6 | 0 | .571 | 62 | 51 | 20 | 9 | 11 | 0 | 83 | 83 |
| Hobart | 9 | 5 | 4 | 0 | .556 | 47 | 42 | 23 | 10 | 13 | 0 | 118 | 122 |
| Fairfield | 19 | 10 | 9 | 0 | .526 | 98 | 67 | 26 | 13 | 13 | 0 | | |
| Assumption | 18 | 8 | 10 | 0 | .444 | 102 | 105 | 20 | 9 | 11 | 0 | | |
| Queens College | 5 | 2 | 3 | 0 | .400 | 21 | 37 | | | | | | |
| New Hampshire College | 11 | 4 | 7 | 1 | .375 | 64 | 52 | 20 | 11 | 8 | 1 | | |
| Plymouth State | 8 | 3 | 5 | 0 | .375 | 35 | 37 | 13 | 6 | 7 | 0 | | |
| Ramapo | 17 | 6 | 11 | 0 | .353 | 56 | 87 | | | | | | |
| Lehigh | 6 | 2 | 4 | 0 | .333 | 15 | 43 | 13 | 5 | 7 | 1 | 57 | 78 |
| Upsala | 7 | 2 | 5 | 0 | .286 | 35 | 37 | | | | | | |
| Quinnipiac | 17 | 4 | 12 | 1 | .265 | 83 | 146 | 20 | 5 | 14 | 1 | 95 | 161 |
| Nichols | 16 | 4 | 12 | 0 | .250 | 53 | 87 | 19 | 5 | 14 | 0 | 67 | 105 |
| Clark | 12 | 2 | 10 | 0 | .167 | 54 | 74 | | | | | | |
| Worcester State | 13 | 1 | 12 | 0 | .077 | 33 | 132 | 23 | 1 | 22 | 0 | | |
| Gordon | 5 | 0 | 5 | 0 | .000 | 13 | 54 | | | | | | |
| Connecticut College | 11 | 0 | 11 | 0 | .000 | 23 | 84 | 23 | 12 | 10 | 1 | | |
Championship: March , 1980 † indicates conference regular season champion * indicates conference tournament champion

1979–80 NCAA Division III Independent ice hockey standings
| | Overall record | | | | | |
| | GP | W | L | T | GF | GA |
|---|---|---|---|---|---|---|
| Curry | 19 | 6 | 13 | 0 | | |

== See also ==
- 1979–80 NCAA Division I men's ice hockey season
- 1979–80 NCAA Division II men's ice hockey season
