= 1978–79 NCAA Division III men's ice hockey season =

- Duration: November 1978– March 1979
- NCAA tournament: 1979

The 1978–79 NCAA Division III men's ice hockey season began in November 1978 and concluded in March 1979. This was the 6th season of Division III college ice hockey.

== Regular season ==
=== Standings ===
1978–79 ECAC 3 standings
	Conference							Overall					
	GP	W	L	T	Pct.	GF	GA	GP	W	L	T	GF	GA
Framingham State *	13	12	1	0	.923	97	33	29	20	9	0		
RIT	8	7	1	0	.875	67	24	22	15	7	0	156	91
Plymouth State	8	7	1	0	.875	52	26	15	13	2	0		
Trinity	17	14	3	0	.824	128	55	22	16	6	0	166	97
Wesleyan	13	9	4	0	.692	98	63	24	11	13	0	123	119
Southeastern Massachusetts	13	9	4	0	.692	75	53	20	14	6	0		
Iona	16	11	5	0	.688	104	70	21	15	6	0		
Nichols	14	9	5	0	.643	71	55	20	12	7	1	95	96
Amherst	10	6	4	0	.600	63	58	20	6	14	0		
New Hampshire College	7	4	3	0	.571	30	36	21	11	8	2		
Assumption	11	6	5	0	.545	58	69	19	11	8	0		
Bentley	14	7	7	0	.500	74	65	18	7	11	0	89	95
Fitchburg State	14	7	7	0	.500	64	66	22	11	11	0		
Fairfield	18	7	11	0	.389	92	89	23	7	16	0		
Stonehill	13	5	8	0	.385	78	74	21	9	11	1		
Hobart	10	3	7	0	.300	32	58	32	15	16	1	186	166
Gordon	4	1	3	0	.250	16	27						
Ramapo	14	3	11	0	.214	51	93						
Clark	10	2	8	0	.200	41	76						
Lehigh	11	2	9	0	.182	30	90	14	4	10	0	52	109
Worcester State	12	2	10	0	.167	63	95	21	2	19	0		
Quinnipiac	18	2	16	0	.111	74	144	20	4	16	0		
Championship: March , 1979 † indicates conference regular season champion * indicates conference tournament champion

1978–79 NCAA Division III Independent ice hockey standings
	Overall record					
	GP	W	L	T	GF	GA
Curry	20	13	6	1		

== See also ==
- 1978–79 NCAA Division I men's ice hockey season
- 1978–79 NCAA Division II men's ice hockey season
