= 1977–78 NCAA Division III men's ice hockey season =

- Duration: November 1977– March 1978
- NCAA tournament: 1978

The 1977–78 NCAA Division III men's ice hockey season began in November 1977 and concluded in March 1978. This was the 5th season of Division III college ice hockey.

== Regular season ==
=== Standings ===
1977–78 ECAC 3 standings
	Conference							Overall					
	GP	W	L	T	Pct.	GF	GA	GP	W	L	T	GF	GA
Westfield State †*	13	13	0	0	1.000			22	20	2	0		
Queens College	2	2	0	0	1.000								
Framingham State	14	13	1	0	.929			25	20	5	0		
Iona	15	10	3	2	.733			19	12	5	2		
Trinity	15	10	5	0	.667	103	67	21	12	9	0	132	108
Amherst	9	6	3	0	.667			18	8	10	0		
RIT	6	3	2	1	.583	31	26	17	8	8	1	83	84
Nichols	11	6	5	0	.545	56	51	17	11	6	0	102	75
Bentley	16	9	7	0	.563	99	78	19	10	9	0	120	107
Fairfield	19	9	9	1	.500			21	8	12	1		
Lehigh	2	1	1	0	.500			15	5	10	0	62	93
Worcester State	13	6	7	0	.462			22	7	15	0		
Assumption	10	4	6	0	.400			20	11	9	0		
Southeastern Massachusetts	5	2	3	0	.400			17	10	7	0		
Plymouth State	4	1	2	1	.375			13	10	2	1		
Fitchburg State	15	5	9	1	.367			20	6	13	1		
Massachusetts Maritime	11	4	7	0	.364			18	7	11	0		
Ramapo	12	3	7	2	.333	44	55	12	3	7	2		
Wesleyan	12	4	8	0	.333	53	68	22	4	18	0	75	147
New Hampshire College	3	1	2	0	.333			15	6	7	2		
City College of New York	4	0	3	1	.125								
Quinnipiac	13	1	12	0	.077			20	8	12	0	101	148
Note: Leigh, City College of New York, Queens, Southeastern Massachusetts, and New Hampshire College were not included in the final published ECAC 3 standings. Their records as shown are from their last appearances in the standings. Championship: March __, 1978 † indicates conference regular season champion * indicates conference tournament champion

1977–78 NCAA Division III Independent ice hockey standings
	Overall record					
	GP	W	L	T	GF	GA
Curry	15	3	11	1		

== See also ==
- 1977–78 NCAA Division I men's ice hockey season
- 1977–78 NCAA Division II men's ice hockey season
