= 1983–84 NCAA Division III men's ice hockey season =

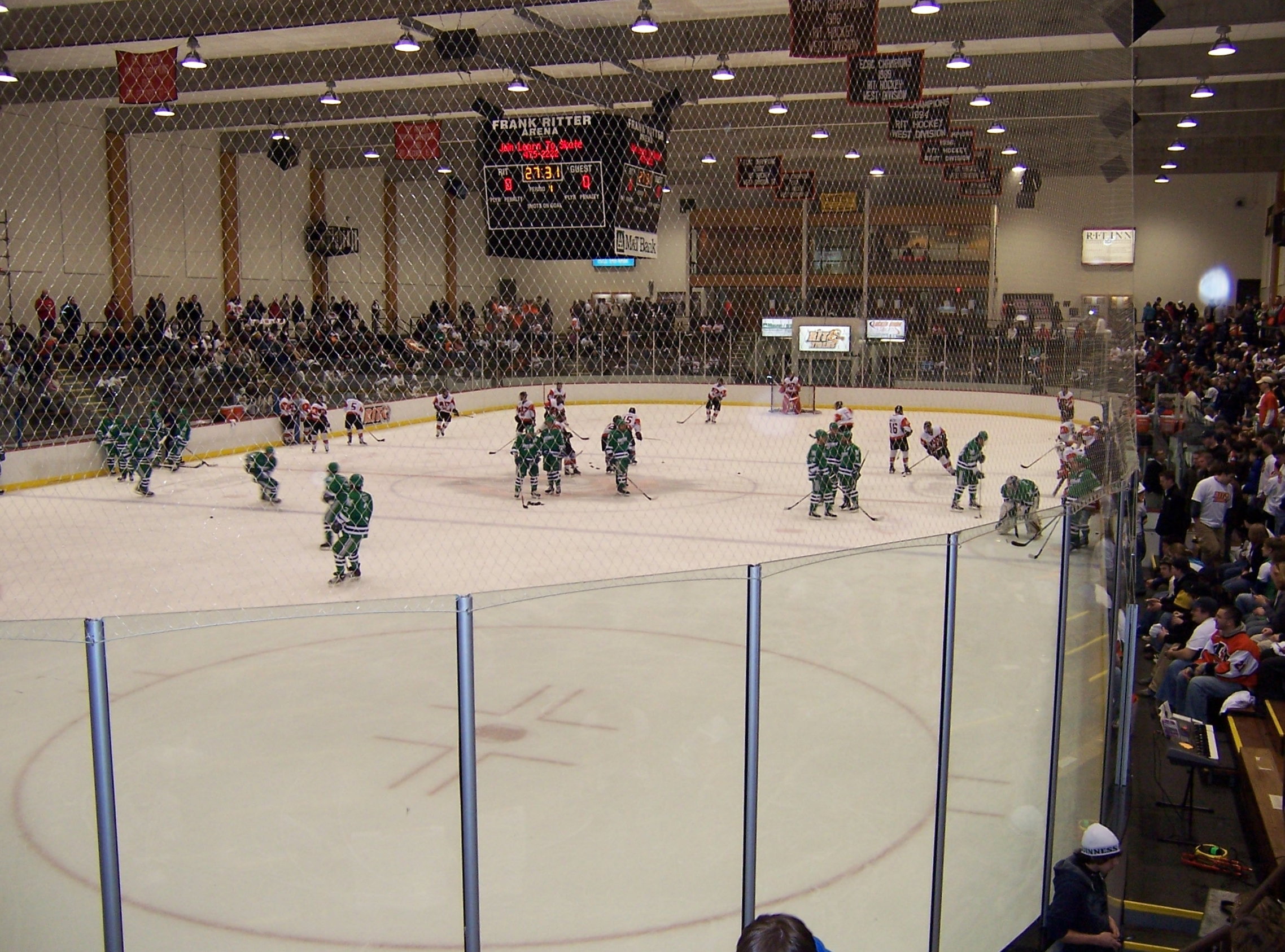
- Frank Ritter Memorial Ice Arena was the host of the 1984 Frozen Four
- Duration: November 1983– March 18, 1984
- NCAA tournament: 1984
- National championship: Frank Ritter Memorial Ice Arena; Rochester, New York
- NCAA champion: Babson

The 1983–84 NCAA Division III men's ice hockey season began in November 1983 and concluded on March 23 of the following year. This was the 11th season of Division III college ice hockey.

This was the first season in which the NCAA held a national tournament for the Division III level.

The majority of programs that had been playing at the Division II level came from Division III schools but with the institution of the new championship all of the Division III schools were able to drop down to their normal level. Additionally, with an NCAA-sponsored tournament for Division III schools, most NAIA teams switched to NCAA classification and, with the NAIA Ice Hockey Championship becoming a superfluous tournament, the NAIA ended its sponsorship of ice hockey in 1984.

Because only one Division III tournament existed at the time and it permitted its Division II members to participate in the conference tournament no automatic bids could be offered to conference tournament champions. The NCAA continued to refrain from offering automatic bids until 2000.

== Regular season ==
=== Standings ===
1983–84 ECAC 3 standings
	Conference							Overall					
	GP	W	L	T	Pct.	GF	GA	GP	W	L	T	GF	GA
Amherst †	14	13	1	0	.929			24	17	6	1		
Iona	19	15	2	2	.842			24	18	4	2		
New Hampshire College	23	18	4	1	.804			28	18	9	1		
Southeastern Massachusetts *	17	13	3	1	.794			23	17	5	1		
Assumption	16	12	4	0	.750			22	14	8	0		
Saint Michael's	13	9	4	0	.692	74	52	20	12	8	0	103	103
Bentley	16	11	5	0	.688	92	60	24	13	11	0	122	109
Fitchburg State	18	12	6	0	.667			26	13	13	0		
Roger Williams	12	8	4	0	.667			22	13	9	0		
Wesleyan	19	12	7	0	.632	98	79	24	12	12	0	114	110
Upsala	12	7	4	1	.625			18	10	7	1		
Stonehill	19	11	8	0	.579			23	12	11	0		
Trinity	17	9	6	1	.559	71	48	23	11	11	1	93	88
Framingham State	17	8	8	1	.500			24	8	15	1		
Curry	13	6	7	0	.462			24	16	7	1		
St. John's	16	6	8	2	.438			18	6	10	2		
Fairfield	23	8	12	3	.413			24	8	13	3		
Quinnipiac	21	8	12	1	.405	96	111	24	10	13	1	110	124
Suffolk	13	5	8	0	.385			22	11	11	0		
Connecticut College	16	5	11	0	.313			19	7	12	0		
Plymouth State	13	4	9	0	.308			17	5	12	0		
Western New England	16	4	12	0	.250			13	2	11	0		
Skidmore	8	1	6	1	.188			16	3	11	2		
Worcester State	13	2	11	0	.154			18	2	16	0		
Villanova	14	1	11	2	.143			25	8	15	2		
Lehigh	9	1	8	0	.111			16	5	11	0		
Nichols	21	2	19	0	.095			21	2	19	0	78	176
Keene State	12	1	11	0	.083			13	1	12	0		
Championship: March , 1984 † indicates conference regular season champion * indicates conference tournament champion

1983–84 NCAA Division III Independent ice hockey standings
	Overall record					
	GP	W	L	T	GF	GA
St. Bonaventure	27	18	9	0		

== 1984 NCAA tournament ==
Quarterfinals; March 10–11
Augsburg	8	5*	13
St. Thomas	7	5	12
Babson	4	2**	6
New England College	3	2	5
RIT	13	10	23
Oswego State	2	1	3
Union	4	4	8
Wisconsin-River Falls	0	6	6

Semifinals; March 17
Augsburg	2
Babson	7
RIT	4
Union	5****

National championship March 18
Babson	8
Union	0
Third-place game
Augsburg	1
RIT	10

Note: * denotes overtime period(s)

== See also ==
- 1983–84 NCAA Division I men's ice hockey season
- 1983–84 NCAA Division II men's ice hockey season
