= 1982–83 NCAA Division III men's ice hockey season =

- Duration: November 1982– March 1983
- NCAA tournament: 1983

The 1982–83 NCAA Division III men's ice hockey season began in November 1982 and concluded in March 1983. This was the 10th season of Division III college ice hockey.

== Regular season ==
=== Standings ===
1982–83 ECAC 3 standings
	Conference							Overall					
	GP	W	L	T	Pct.	GF	GA	GP	W	L	T	GF	GA
Iona	15	14	1	0	.933			22	18	4	0		
Hobart	5	4	1	0	.800			19	11	8	0	98	102
Fitchburg State	19	15	4	0	.789			24	16	8	0		
Wesleyan	16	12	3	1	.781	107	48	23	12	9	2	143	99
Southeastern Massachusetts *	15	11	4	0	.733			22	15	7	0		
New Hampshire College	22	16	6	0	.727			24	16	8	0		
Amherst	11	8	3	0	.727			21	12	9	0		
Bentley	14	9	4	1	.679	77	53	21	9	10	2	90	100
Trinity	15	10	5	0	.667	87	63	22	10	11	1	104	109
Connecticut College	17	10	7	0	.588			22	13	9	0		
Worcester State	16	9	7	0	.563			22	10	12	0		
Assumption	17	9	8	0	.529			19	10	9	0		
Fairfield	22	10	12	0	.455			23	10	13	0		
St. John's	16	7	9	0	.438								
Framingham State	14	6	8	0	.429			22	7	15	0		
Plymouth State	12	5	7	0	.417			17	6	10	1		
Villanova	6	2	4	0	.333				25	12	11	2	
Quinnipiac	19	6	13	0	.316			22	6	16	0	83	123
Stonehill	17	5	12	0	.294			20	6	14	0		
Saint Michael's	14	4	10	0	.286			18	5	13	0	70	99
Suffolk	18	4	14	0	.222			22	6	16	0		
Nichols	17	2	15	0	.118			19	1	18	0	54	175
Western New England	12	0	12	0	.000			16	1	15	0		
Kean	0	0	0	0	–			17	3	13	1		
Championship: March , 1983 † indicates conference regular season champion * indicates conference tournament champion

1982–83 NCAA Division III Independent ice hockey standings
	Overall record					
	GP	W	L	T	GF	GA
Curry	22	16	5	1		
Lehigh	18	5	13	0		
Skidmore	15	6	9	0		
St. Bonaventure	29	17	10	2		

== See also ==
- 1982–83 NCAA Division I men's ice hockey season
- 1982–83 NCAA Division II men's ice hockey season
