= List of Holy Cross Crusaders men's ice hockey seasons =

This is a season-by-season list of records compiled by Holy Cross in men's ice hockey.

The College of the Holy Cross has made two appearances in the NCAA Tournament, winning what is widely regarded as the biggest upset in the history of the championship.

== Season-by-season results ==
Note: GP = Games played, W = Wins, L = Losses, T = Ties

NCAA D-I Champions	NCAA Frozen Four	Conference regular season champions	Conference Playoff Champions

Season	Conference	Regular Season (Note: Code explanation; GP—Games Played, W—Wins, L—Losses, T—Tied games, OTW—Overtime Wins, OTL—Overtime Loses, 3/SW—Win in 3 on 3 overtime or shootout, Pts—Points*)														Conference Tournament Results	National Tournament Results
Season	Conference	Conference									Overall					Conference Tournament Results	National Tournament Results
Season	Conference	GP	W	L	T	OTW	OTL	3/SW	Pts*	Finish	GP	W	L	T	%	Conference Tournament Results	National Tournament Results
College Division
Bill Kane (1966–1976)
1966–67	WCHL	8	8	0	0	–	–	–	1.000	1st	24	16	8	0	.667	Won WCHL Semifinal, 7–4 (Assumption); Won Championship, 4–3 (Nichols)	
1967–68	ECAC 2	21	13	8	0	–	–	–	.619	–	24	16	8	0	.667	Won WCHL Semifinal, 8–5 (Worcester State); Won Championship, 10–0 (Assumption)	
1967–68	WCHL	8	8	0	0	–	–	–	1.000	1st	24	16	8	0	.667	Won WCHL Semifinal, 8–5 (Worcester State); Won Championship, 10–0 (Assumption)	
1968–69	ECAC 2	22	9	12	1	–	–	–	.432	–	23	16	6	1	.717	Won WCHL Semifinal, 5–2 (Nichols); Won Championship, 7–2 (Worcester State)	
1968–69	WCHL	7	7	0	0	–	–	–	1.000	1st	23	16	6	1	.717	Won WCHL Semifinal, 5–2 (Nichols); Won Championship, 7–2 (Worcester State)	
1969–70	ECAC 2	22	9	12	1	–	–	–	.432	–	27	13	13	1	.500	Lost WCHL Semifinal, 3–5 (Nichols); Won WCHL Third-place game, 7–1 (WPI)	
1969–70	WCHL	8	6	1	1	–	–	–	.813	1st	27	13	13	1	.500	Lost WCHL Semifinal, 3–5 (Nichols); Won WCHL Third-place game, 7–1 (WPI)	
1970–71	ECAC 2	18	12	6	0	–	–	–	.667	—	19	13	6	0	.684		
1971–72	ECAC 2	14	1	13	0	–	–	–	.071	—	20	4	16	0	.200		
1972–73	ECAC 2	12	2	10	0	–	–	–	.167	—	23	11	12	0	.478		
Division II
1973–74	ECAC 2	12	2	10	0	–	–	–	.167	—	23	11	12	0	.478		
1974–75	ECAC 2	12	4	8	0	–	–	–	.333	—	21	11	10	0	.524		
1975–76	ECAC 2	17	6	11	0	–	–	–	.353	—	25	14	11	0	.560		
Mike Addesa (1976–1979)
1976–77	ECAC 2	22	10	12	0	–	–	–	.455	—	27	15	12	0	.556		
1977–78	ECAC 2	21	13	7	1	–	–	–	.643	—	26	16	9	1	.648	Lost Quarterfinal, 1–4 (Salem State)	
1978–79	ECAC 2	21	13	8	0	–	–	–	.619	—	28	18	10	0	.643	Lost Quarterfinal, 0–4 (Merrimack)	
Peter Van Buskirk (1979–1988)
1979–80	ECAC 2	21	15	6	0	–	–	–	.714	6th	30	21	9	0	.700	Won Quarterfinal, 5–1 (Salem State); Lost Semifinal, 2–4 (Lowell)	
1980–81	ECAC 2	22	11	11	0	–	–	–	.500	—	31	14	17	0	.452	Lost Quarterfinal, 7–10 (Merrimack)	
1981–82	ECAC 2	24	12	10	2	–	–	–	.542	14th	33	16	15	2	.515		
1982–83	ECAC 2	24	16	7	1	–	–	–	.688	5th	32	20	10	2	.656	Won Quarterfinal, 14–9 (Bowdoin); Lost Semifinal, 2–6 (Babson)	
1983–84	ECAC 2	21	8	11	2	–	–	–	.429	—	28	10	15	3	.411		
Division III
1984–85	ECAC East	22	13	9	0	–	–	–	.591	—	34	19	15	0	.559	Lost Quarterfinal, 4–7 (Norwich)	
1985–86	ECAC East	22	11	11	0	–	–	–	.500	—	34	18	16	0	.529		
1986–87	ECAC East	24	12	12	0	–	–	–	.500	—	36	17	18	1	.486	Lost Quarterfinal 2–8 (Bowdoin)	
1987–88	ECAC East	22	10	12	0	–	–	–	.455	—	36	18	18	0	.500	Lost Quarterfinal 1–7 (Merrimack)	
Bill Bellerose (1988–1994)
1988–89	ECAC East	25	9	16	0	–	–	–	.360	—	31	10	21	0	.323		
1989–90	ECAC East	20	5	14	1	–	–	–	.275	—	28	7	20	1	.268		
1990–91	ECAC East	19	2	17	0	–	–	–	.105	—	28	8	19	1	.304		
1991–92	ECAC East	19	8	11	0	–	–	–	.421	—	25	13	12	0	.520		
1992–93	ECAC East	21	7	11	1	–	–	–	.395	—	25	10	14	1	.420		
1993–94	ECAC East	17	10	7	0	–	–	–	.588	—	26	13	13	0	.500	Lost Quarterfinal 3–8 (Salem State)	
Paul Pearl (1994–1996)
1994–95	ECAC East	18	11	7	0	–	–	–	.611	—	25	15	10	0	.600	Lost Quarterfinal 0–6 (Bowdoin)	
1995–96	ECAC East	19	9	8	2	–	–	–	.526	—	26	13	11	2	.538	Lost Quarterfinal 2–7 (Salem State)	
Peter Van Buskirk (1996–1997)
1996–97	ECAC East	20	11	9	0	–	–	–	.550	—	27	14	13	0	.519	Won Quarterfinal, 1–0 (Babson); Lost Semifinal, 2–3 (Norwich)	
Paul Pearl (1997–2014)
1997–98	ECAC East	19	13	4	2	–	–	–	.553	—	26	16	8	2	.654	Lost Quarterfinal 3–5 (Norwich)	
Division I
1998–99	MAAC	28	19	6	3	–	–	–	41	2nd	35	22	9	4	.686	Won Quarterfinal 3–1 (Sacred Heart); Won Semifinal 4–3 (Connecticut); Won Championship 4–3 (Canisius)	
1999–00	MAAC	27	8	16	3	–	–	–	19	7th	35	8	24	3	.271	Lost Quarterfinal 3–10 (Mercyhurst)	
2000–01	MAAC	26	8	16	2	–	–	–	18	10th	32	8	22	2	.281		
2001–02	MAAC	26	14	7	5	–	–	–	33	T–3rd	34	17	12	5	.574	Lost Quarterfinal 5–6 (Connecticut)	
2002–03	MAAC	26	14	11	1	–	–	–	29	T–3rd	36	17	18	1	.486	Won Quarterfinal 3–2 (Army); Lost Semifinal 0–3 (Quinnipiac)	
2003–04	Atlantic Hockey	24	17	4	3	–	–	–	37	1st	36	22	10	4	.667	Won Quarterfinal 5–0 (American International); Won Semifinal 4–1 (Canisius); Won Championship 4–0 (Sacred Heart)	Lost Regional semifinal 0–3 (North Dakota)
2004–05	Atlantic Hockey	24	12	7	5	–	–	–	29	4th	36	16	14	6	.528	Won Quarterfinal 4–2 (Sacred Heart); Lost Semifinal 3–4 (Mercyhurst)	
2005–06	Atlantic Hockey	28	19	7	2	–	–	–	40	1st	39	27	10	2	.718	Won Quarterfinal 3–1 (American International); Won Semifinal 4–1 (Connecticut); Won Championship 5–2 (Bentley)	Won Regional semifinal 4–3 (Minnesota); Lost Regional Final 2–5 (North Dakota)
2006–07	Atlantic Hockey	28	9	14	5	–	–	–	23	6th	35	10	20	5	.357	Lost Quarterfinal 0–3 (Air Force)	
2007–08	Atlantic Hockey	28	9	15	4	–	–	–	22	9th	36	10	19	7	.375	Lost Quarterfinal series 0–2 (RIT)	
2008–09	Atlantic Hockey	28	10	15	3	–	–	–	23	7th	38	13	20	5	.408	Won First round 1–0 (American International); Lost Quarterfinal series 1–2 (RIT)	
2009–10	Atlantic Hockey	28	10	13	5	–	–	–	25	7th	37	12	19	6	.405	Won First round 4–2 (American International); Lost Quarterfinal series 0–2 (Sacred Heart)	
2010–11	Atlantic Hockey	27	14	8	5	–	–	–	33	3rd	38	17	16	5	.513	Won Quarterfinal series 2–1 (Canisius); Lost Semifinal 2–3 (Air Force)	
2011–12	Atlantic Hockey	27	15	8	4	–	–	–	34	T–3rd	39	20	15	4	.564	Won First round series 2–0 (Army); Lost Quarterfinal series 1–2 (Mercyhurst)	
2012–13	Atlantic Hockey	27	15	9	3	–	–	–	33	3rd	37	20	14	3	.581	Lost Quarterfinal series 1–2 (Mercyhurst)	
2013–14	Atlantic Hockey	27	11	13	3	–	–	–	25	T–7th	39	14	22	3	.397	Won First round series 2–1 (RIT); Lost Quarterfinal series 0–2 (Mercyhurst)	
David Berard (2014–2021)
2014–15	Atlantic Hockey	28	12	11	5	–	–	–	29	T-6th	37	14	18	5	.446	Lost First round series 1–2 (Niagara)	
2015–16	Atlantic Hockey	28	16	7	5	–	–	–	37	T–2nd	36	18	13	5	.569	Lost Quarterfinal series 0–2 (Army)	
2016–17	Atlantic Hockey	28	11	10	7	–	–	–	29	5th	36	14	15	7	.486	Lost Quarterfinal series 0–2 (Robert Morris)	
2017–18	Atlantic Hockey	28	12	10	6	–	–	–	30	T–3rd	36	13	16	7	.458	Lost Quarterfinal series 0–2 (Robert Morris)	
2018–19	Atlantic Hockey	28	10	14	4	–	–	–	24	T–8th	36	10	21	5	.347	Lost Quarterfinal series 0–2 (Robert Morris)	
2019–20	Atlantic Hockey	28	9	16	3	–	–	2	32	10th	37	11	21	5	.365	Lost Quarterfinal series 1–2 (Robert Morris)	
2020–21	Atlantic Hockey	12	3	9	0	2	0	0	.194	11th	16	4	12	0	.250	Participation cancelled due to COVID-19	
Bill Riga (2021–Present)
2021–22	Atlantic Hockey	26	10	14	2	3	0	0	29	10th	37	12	23	2	.351	Lost First round series 0–2, (Mercyhurst)	
2022–23	Atlantic Hockey	26	12	12	2	3	1	1	37	7th	41	17	21	3	.451	Won Quarterfinal series 2–1, (American International); Won Semifinal series, 2–1 (RIT); Lost Championship, 0–3 (Canisius)	
2023–24	Atlantic Hockey	26	13	10	3	0	3	1	46	2nd	39	21	14	4	.590	Won Quarterfinal series 2–0, (Canisius); Lost Semifinal series, 1–2 (American International)	
2024–25	AHA	26	19	5	2	4	0	1	56	1st	40	24	14	2	.625	Won Quarterfinal series 2–1, (American International); Won Semifinal series, 1–2 (Army); Lost Championship, 3–6 (Bentley)	
2025–26	AHA	26	14	10	2	1	1	0	45	T–3rd	38	18	18	2	.500	Won Quarterfinal series 2–0, (RIT); Lost Semifinal series, 0–2 (Bentley)	
Totals											GP	W	L	T	%	Championships	
Regular Season											1774	824	820	130	.501	4 WCHL Championships, 2 Atlantic Hockey Championships, 1 AHA CHampionship	
Conference Post-season											104	47	57	0	.452	3 WCHL tournament championship, 1 MAAC tournament championship, 2 Atlantic Hockey tournament championships	
NCAA Post-season											3	1	2	0	.333	2 NCAA Tournament Appearances	
Regular Season and Post-season Record											1881	872	879	130	.498		

* Winning percentage is used when conference schedules are unbalanced.
