= List of UConn Huskies men's ice hockey seasons =

This is a list of seasons completed by the UConn Huskies men's ice hockey team, representing the University of Connecticut in NCAA Division I men's hockey. The list documents the season-by-season records of the Huskies from 1960 to present, including postseason records, and league awards for individual players or head coaches.

UConn has won one conference tournament championship since establishing the program in 1960. The Huskies began Division I play in 1998 as a member of the Metro Atlantic Athletic Conference, which became known as Atlantic Hockey in 2003. The Huskies began competition in Hockey East in 2014.

== Season-by-season results ==
Note: GP = Games played, W = Wins, L = Losses, T = Ties

NCAA D-I Champions	NCAA Frozen Four	Conference Regular Season Champions	Conference Playoff Champions

Season	Conference	Regular Season (Note: Code explanation; GP—Games Played, W—Wins, L—Losses, T—Tied games, OTW—Overtime Wins, OTL—Overtime Loses, 3/SW—Win in 3 on 3 overtime or shootout, Pts—Points*)														Conference Tournament Results	National Tournament Results
Season	Conference	Conference									Overall					Conference Tournament Results	National Tournament Results
Season	Conference	GP	W	L	T	OTW	OTL	3/SW	Pts*	Finish	GP	W	L	T	%	Conference Tournament Results	National Tournament Results
John Chapman (1960–1981)
1960–61	Independent	—	—	—	—	—	—	—	—	—	11	4	6	1	.409		
1961–62	ECAC Hockey	9	2	6	1	—	—	—	.278	25th	12	2	9	1	.208		
1962–63	ECAC Hockey	4	2	2	0	—	—	—	.500	12th	7	4	3	0	.571		
1963–64	ECAC Hockey	7	2	5	0	—	—	—	.286	22nd	11	3	8	0	.273		
College Division
1964–65	ECAC 2	9	4	5	0	—	—	—	.444	—	16	10	6	0	.625		
1965–66	ECAC 2	15	5	10	0	—	—	—	.333	—	21	10	11	0	.476		
1966–67	ECAC 2	9	2	7	0	—	—	—	.222	—	16	6	10	0	.375		
1967–68	ECAC 2	16	8	8	0	—	—	—	.500	—	23	13	10	0	.565		
1968–69	ECAC 2	15	9	6	0	—	—	—	.600	—	22	12	10	0	.545		
1969–70	ECAC 2	15	8	7	0	—	—	—	.533	—	20	11	9	0	.550		
1970–71	ECAC 2	19	5	14	0	—	—	—	.263	—	23	7	16	0	.304		
1971–72	ECAC 2	17	6	11	0	—	—	—	.353	—	26	11	15	0	.423		
1972–73	ECAC 2	14	4	10	0	—	—	—	.286	—	24	12	12	0	.500		
Division II
1973–74	ECAC 2	16	7	9	0	—	—	—	.438	—	25	15	10	0	.600		
1974–75	ECAC 2	18	9	8	1	—	—	—	.528	—	26	15	10	1	.596		
1975–76	ECAC 2	20	8	11	1	—	—	—	.425	—	24	12	11	1	.521		
1976–77	ECAC 2	21	5	14	1	—	—	—	.275	—	24	8	14	2	.375		
1977–78	ECAC 2	18	7	10	1	—	—	—	.417	—	23	12	10	1	.543		
1978–79	ECAC 2	19	5	14	0	—	—	—	.263	—	25	11	14	0	.440		
1979–80	ECAC 2	19	9	10	0	—	—	—	.474	—	24	13	11	0	.542		
1980–81	ECAC 2	16	1	15	0	—	—	—	.063	—	21	5	16	0	.238		
Ben Kirtland (1981–1988)
1981–82	ECAC 2	16	5	11	0	—	—	—	.313	—	20	9	11	0	.450		
1982–83	ECAC 2	19	8	11	0	—	—	—	.421	—	24	10	14	0	.417		
1983–84	ECAC 2	20	7	13	0	—	—	—	.350	—	28	13	15	0	.464		
Division III
1984–85	ECAC East	18	9	9	0	—	—	—	.500	8th	24	14	10	0	.583	Lost Quarterfinal, 2–5 (Salem State)	
1985–86	ECAC East	15	10	5	0	—	—	—	.667	6th	33	16	17	0	.485	Lost Quarterfinal, 2–4 (Babson)	
1986–87	ECAC East	17	8	7	2	—	—	—	.529	8th	29	11	16	2	.414	Lost Quarterfinal, 2–6 (Merrimack)	
1987–88	ECAC East	18	8	10	0	—	—	—	.444	—	27	12	15	0	.444		
Bruce Marshall (1988–2012)
1988–89	ECAC East	16	5	11	0	—	—	—	.313	—	27	6	21	0	.222		
1989–90	ECAC East	15	9	5	1	—	—	—	.633	6th	27	15	11	1	.574	Lost Quarterfinal, 4–6 (Bowdoin)	
1990–91	ECAC East	15	9	4	2	—	—	—	.667	—	27	18	7	2	.704	Lost Quarterfinal 7–8 (Salem State)	
1991–92	ECAC East	17	15	1	1	—	—	—	.912	1st	28	22	4	2	.821	Won Quarterfinal 5–1 (Norwich); Lost Semifinal 1–4 (Babson)	
1992–93	ECAC East	15	12	3	0	—	—	—	.800	—	27	19	6	2	.741	Won Quarterfinal 5–3 (Hamilton); Lost Semifinal 1–6 (Bowdoin)	
1993–94	ECAC East	18	12	3	3	—	—	—	.750	—	26	15	8	3	.635	Won Quarterfinal 5–4 (Colby); Lost Semifinal 2–5 (Bowdoin)	
1994–95	ECAC East	18	10	3	5	—	—	—	.694	—	27	15	7	5	.648	Won Quarterfinal 9–4 (Hamilton); Lost Semifinal 3–4 (Salem State)	
1995–96	ECAC East	19	10	8	1	—	—	—	.553	—	26	16	9	1	.635	Lost Quarterfinal 5–7 (Babson)	
1996–97	ECAC East	19	8	9	2	—	—	—	.474	—	25	11	12	2	.480		
1997–98	ECAC East	19	10	8	1	—	—	—	.553	—	27	13	13	1	.500	Won Quarterfinal 3–1 (Trinity); Lost Semifinal 3–8 (Connecticut College)	
Division I
1998–99	MAAC	28	18	6	4	—	—	—	40	3rd	34	20	10	4	.647	Won Quarterfinal 6–5 (Iona); Lost Semifinal 3–4 (Holy Cross)	
1999–00	MAAC	27	15	11	1	—	—	—	31	T-4th	36	19	16	1	.542	Won Quarterfinal 5–4 (Sacred Heart); Won Semifinal 2–0 (Mercyhurst); Won Championship 6–1 (Iona)	
2000–01	MAAC	26	12	11	3	—	—	—	27	5th	35	12	19	4	.400	Lost Quarterfinal 1–4 (Canisius)	
2001–02	MAAC	26	11	10	5	—	—	—	27	6th	36	13	16	7	.458	Won Quarterfinal 6–5 (Holy Cross); Lost Semifinal 0–5 (Mercyhurst)	
2002–03	MAAC	26	7	16	3	—	—	—	17	10th	34	8	23	3	.279		
2003–04	Atlantic Hockey	24	9	10	5	—	—	—	23	5th	35	12	16	7	.443	Lost Quarterfinal 0–3 (Sacred Heart)	
2004–05	Atlantic Hockey	24	10	12	2	—	—	—	22	6th	37	11	23	3	.338	Lost Quarterfinal 4–7 (Mercyhurst)	
2005–06	Atlantic Hockey	28	9	18	1	—	—	—	19	6th	36	11	23	2	.333	Won Quarterfinal 4–1 (Sacred Heart); Lost Semifinal 1–4 (Holy Cross)	
2006–07	Atlantic Hockey	28	15	11	2	—	—	—	32	4th	36	16	18	2	.472	Won Quarterfinal 5–4 (Mercyhurst); Lost Semifinal 1–3 (Army)	
2007–08	Atlantic Hockey	28	11	14	3	—	—	—	25	7th	37	13	21	3	.392	Lost Quarterfinal series 1–2 (Sacred Heart)	
2008–09	Atlantic Hockey	28	8	18	2	—	—	—	18	9th	37	9	26	2	.270	Lost First Round 2–4 (Sacred Heart)	
2009–10	Atlantic Hockey	28	6	19	3	—	—	—	15	9th	37	7	27	3	.230	Won First Round 2–1 (Bentley); Lost Quarterfinal series 0–2 (RIT)	
2010–11	Atlantic Hockey	27	13	12	2	—	—	—	28	6th	38	15	18	4	.459	Won Quarterfinal series 2–0 (Mercyhurst); Lost Semifinal 2–4 (RIT)	
2011–12	Atlantic Hockey	27	12	12	3	—	—	—	27	8th	39	16	19	4	.462	Won First Round series 2–0 (Canisius); Lost Quarterfinal series 1–2 (Air Force)	
David Berard (2012–2013)
2012–13	Atlantic Hockey	27	14†	10†	3†	—	—	—	31†	4th	37	19†	14†	4†	.568	Won Quarterfinal series 2–0 (Robert Morris); Lost Semifinal 1–4 (Mercyhurst)	
Mike Cavanaugh (2013–Present)
2013–14	Atlantic Hockey	27	15	9	3	—	—	—	33	T–3rd	36	18	14	4	.556	Lost Quarterfinal series 0–2 (Robert Morris)	
2014–15	Hockey East	22	7	11	4	—	—	—	18	T-9th	36	10	19	7	.375	Lost Opening Round series 0–2 (New Hampshire)	
2015–16	Hockey East	22	6	12	4	—	—	—	16	8th	36	11	21	4	.361	Lost Opening Round series 0–2 (Vermont)	
2016–17	Hockey East	22	8	10	4	—	—	—	20	9th	36	12	16	8	.444	Lost Opening Round series 0–2 (Northeastern)	
2017–18	Hockey East	24	11	12	1	—	—	—	23	T–5th	36	15	19	2	.444	Lost Quarterfinal series, 0–2 (Boston University)	
2018–19	Hockey East	24	7	15	3	—	—	—	16	9th	34	12	20	2	.382		
2019–20	Hockey East	24	12	10	2	—	—	—	26	5th	34	15	15	4	.500	Tournament Cancelled	
2020–21	Hockey East	22	10	10	2	1	4	2	.561	4th	23	10	11	2	.478	Lost Quarterfinal, 1–6 (Providence)	
2021–22	Hockey East	24	14	10	0	2	1	0	41	T–4th	36	20	16	0	.556	Won Quarterfinal, 3–1 (Boston University); Won Semifinal, 4–1 (Northeastern); Lost Championship, 1–2 (OT) (Massachusetts)	
2022–23	Hockey East	24	13	9	2	4	2	2	41	4th	35	20	12	3	.614	Lost Quarterfinal, 1–2 (Massachusetts Lowell)	
2023–24	Hockey East	24	9	14	1	1	1	1	29	8th	36	15	19	2	.444	Won First Round, 4–1 (Vermont); Lost Quarterfinal, 4–5 (Boston College)	
2024–25	Hockey East	24	12	8	4	3	2	1	40	4th	39	23	12	4	.641	Won Quarterfinal, 3–1 (Providence); Won Semifinal, 5–2 (Boston University); Lost Championship, 2–5 (Maine)	Won Regional Semifinal, 4–1 (Quinnipiac); Lost Regional Final, 2–3 (OT) (Penn State)
Totals											GP	W	L	T	%	Championships	
Regular Season											1768	788	857	123	.480	1 ECAC East Championship	
Conference Post-season											66	24	42	0	.364	1 MAAC Tournament Championship	
NCAA Post-season											2	1	1	0	.500	1 NCAA tournament appearance	
Regular Season and Post-season Record											1836	813	900	123	.476		

* Winning percentage is used when conference schedules are unbalanced.
† Bruce Marshall took a medical leave of absence in November 2012.
