= List of Vermont Catamounts men's ice hockey seasons =

This is a season-by-season list of records compiled by Vermont in men's ice hockey.

The University of Vermont has reached the Frozen Four twice in its history.

== Season-by-season results ==
Note: GP = Games played, W = Wins, L = Losses, T = Ties

NCAA D-I Champions	NCAA Frozen Four	Conference regular season champions	Conference Division Champions	Conference Playoff Champions

Season	Conference	Regular Season (Note: Code explanation; GP—Games Played, W—Wins, L—Losses, T—Tied games, OTW—Overtime Wins, OTL—Overtime Loses, 3/SW—Win in 3 on 3 overtime or shootout, Pts—Points*)														Conference Tournament Results	National Tournament Results
Season	Conference	Conference									Overall					Conference Tournament Results	National Tournament Results
Season	Conference	GP	W	L	T	OTW	OTL	3/SW	Pts*	Finish	GP	W	L	T	%	Conference Tournament Results	National Tournament Results
Bill Ruffer (1963–1965)
1963–64	ECAC Hockey	8	4	2	2	–	–	–	.625	10th	10	5	3	2	.600		
College Division
1964–65	ECAC 2	12	4	8	0	–	–	–	.333	–	16	5	11	0	.313		
Jim Cross (1965–1984)
1965–66	ECAC 2	15	8	7	0	–	–	–	.533	–	19	8	11	0	.421		
1966–67	ECAC 2	13	4	9	0	–	–	–	.308	–	19	5	14	0	.263		
1967–68	ECAC 2	18	12	6	0	–	–	–	.667	–	23	12	11	0	.522		
1968–69	ECAC 2	19	11	8	0	–	–	–	.579	—	25	13	12	0	.520		
1969–70	ECAC 2	16	12	4	0	–	–	–	.750	2nd	24	16	8	0	.667	Won Semifinal, 5–1 (Middlebury); Won Championship, 4–1 (Bowdoin)	
1970–71	ECAC 2	16	13	3	0	–	–	–	.813	2nd	26	17	9	0	.654	Won Semifinal, 2–1 (Massachusetts); Lost Championship, 4–5 (OT) (Bowdoin)	
1971–72	ECAC 2	15	12	2	1	–	–	–	.833	T–1st	26	17	7	2	.692	Won Quarterfinal, 5–0 (Lowell Tech); Lost Semifinal, 0–4 (Buffalo)	
1972–73	ECAC 2	16	16	0	0	–	–	–	1.000	1st	31	24	7	0	.774	Won Quarterfinal, 6–2 (Saint Anselm); Won Semifinal, 4–3 (Merrimack); Won Championship, 8–1 (Bowdoin)	
Division II
1973–74	ECAC 2	16	15	1	0	–	–	–	.938	1st	33	28	5	0	.848	Won Quarterfinal, 10–1 (Army); Won Semifinal, 4–3 (Massachusetts); Won Championship, 6–2 (Merrimack)	
Division I
1974–75	ECAC Hockey	17	12	5	0	–	–	–	.706	3rd	36	24	12	0	.667	Won Quarterfinal, 7–5 (Providence); Lost Semifinal, 3–7 (Boston University); Won Third-place game, 7–3 (Cornell)	
1975–76	ECAC Hockey	22	9	13	0	–	–	–	.409	11th	32	15	16	1	.484		
1976–77	ECAC Hockey	23	10	13	0	–	–	–	.435	11th	30	15	15	0	.500		
1977–78	ECAC Hockey	23	9	14	0	–	–	–	.391	T–11th	31	15	16	0	.484		
1978–79	ECAC Hockey	21	11	10	0	–	–	–	.524	8th	30	12	18	0	.400	Lost Quarterfinal, 3–4 (Boston University)	
1979–80	ECAC Hockey	23	16	7	0	–	–	–	.696	4th	35	23	12	0	.657	Lost Quarterfinal, 3–8 (Clarkson)	
1980–81	ECAC Hockey	22	4	16	2	–	–	–	.227	16th	34	9	23	2	.294		
1981–82	ECAC Hockey	22	8	12	2	–	–	–	.409	12th	29	11	16	2	.414		
1982–83	ECAC Hockey	20	3	16	1	–	–	–	.175	15th	28	6	21	1	.232		
1983–84	ECAC Hockey	20	6	13	1	–	–	–	.325	14th	29	10	18	1	.362		
Mike Gilligan (1984–2003)
1984–85	ECAC Hockey	21	4	17	0	–	–	–	8	10th	29	8	21	0	.276		
1985–86	ECAC Hockey	21	11	10	0	–	–	–	22	6th	31	17	13	1	.565	Lost Quarterfinal series, 0–1–1 (Cornell)	
1986–87	ECAC Hockey	22	9	13	0	–	–	–	24	6th	32	18	14	0	.563	Lost Quarterfinal series, 0–2 (St. Lawrence)	
1987–88	ECAC Hockey	22	14	7	1	–	–	–	29	4th	35	21	11	3	.643	Won Quarterfinal series, 1–0–1 (Colgate); Lost Semifinal, 4–6 (St. Lawrence); Lost Third-place game, 1–7 (Harvard)	Lost First round series, 2–10 (Bowling Green)
1988–89	ECAC Hockey	22	13	9	0	–	–	–	26	T–5th	34	20	13	1	.603	Won Quarterfinal series, 1–0–1 (Colgate); Won Semifinal, 3–2 (OT) (Harvard); Lost Championship, 1–4 (St. Lawrence)	
1989–90	ECAC Hockey	22	7	13	2	–	–	–	26	9th	31	9	20	2	.323	Lost First round, 5–7 (Brown)	
1990–91	ECAC Hockey	22	12	8	2	–	–	–	26	6th	33	17	14	2	.545	Lost Quarterfinal series, 1–2 (St. Lawrence)	
1991–92	ECAC Hockey	22	10	9	3	–	–	–	23	7th	31	16	12	3	.565	Lost Preliminary, 1–5 (Rensselaer)	
1992–93	ECAC Hockey	22	10	11	1	–	–	–	21	7th	31	12	16	3	.435	Lost Preliminary, 1–3 (Princeton)	
1993–94	ECAC Hockey	22	10	6	6	–	–	–	26	5th	33	15	12	6	.545	Lost Quarterfinal series, 1–2 (Brown)	
1994–95	ECAC Hockey	22	11	9	2	–	–	–	24	5th	35	19	14	2	.571	Lost Quarterfinal series, 1–2 (Colgate)	
1995–96	ECAC Hockey	22	17	2	3	–	–	–	37	1st	38	27	7	4	.763	Won Quarterfinal series, 2–0 (Rensselaer); Lost Semifinal, 3–4 (Harvard); Won Third-place game, 3–1 (Clarkson)	Won Regional semifinal, 2–1 (Lake Superior State); Lost National semifinal, 3–4 (2OT) (Colorado College)
1996–97	ECAC Hockey	22	13	6	3	–	–	–	29	3rd	36	22	11	3	.653	Lost Quarterfinal series, 1–2 (Princeton)	Lost Regional Quarterfinal, 3–6 (Denver)
1997–98	ECAC Hockey	22	7	11	4	–	–	–	18	T–9th	34	10	20	4	.353	Lost First round Series, 0–1–2 (Clarkson)	
1998–99	ECAC Hockey	22	7	13	2	–	–	–	16	9th	33	13	18	2	.424	Lost First round series, 0–2 (St. Lawrence)	
1999–00	ECAC Hockey	7†	3†	2†	2†	8†	–	–	–	12th†	17†	5†	9†	3†	.382†		
2000–01	ECAC Hockey	22	8	12	2	–	–	–	18	T–9th	34	14	18	2	.441	Won First round series, 2–1 (Clarkson); Lost Four vs. Five, 2–3 (OT) (Dartmouth)	
2001–02	ECAC Hockey	22	3	18	1	–	–	–	7	12th	31	3	26	2	.542		
2002–03	ECAC Hockey	22	8	14	0	–	–	–	16	10th	36	13	20	3	.403	Won First round series, 2–0 (Clarkson); Lost Quarterfinal series, 0–2 (Harvard)	
Kevin Sneddon (2003–2020)
2003–04	ECAC Hockey	22	7	14	1	–	–	–	15	11th	35	9	22	4	.314	Lost First round series, 0–2 (Harvard)	
2004–05	ECAC Hockey	22	13	6	3	–	–	–	29	4th	39	21	14	4	.590	Won Quarterfinal series, 2–1 (Dartmouth); Lost Semifinal, 0–3 (Cornell); Lost Third-place game, 1–2 (Colgate)	
2005–06	Hockey East	27	10	11	6	–	–	–	26	6th	38	18	14	6	.553	Lost Quarterfinal series, 0–2 (Boston College)	
2006–07	Hockey East	27	12	10	5	–	–	–	29	T–5th	39	18	16	5	.526	Lost Quarterfinal series, 1–2 (Boston University)	
2007–08	Hockey East	27	13	9	5	–	–	–	31	3rd	39	17	15	7	.526	Won Quarterfinal series, 2–1 (Northeastern); Won Semifinal, 3–1 (Boston University); Lost Championship, 0–4 (Boston College)	
2008–09	Hockey East	27	15	8	4	–	–	–	32	T–3rd	39	22	12	5	.628	Lost Quarterfinal series, 0–2 (Massachusetts–Lowell)	Won Regional semifinal, 4–1 (Yale); Won Regional Final, 3–2 (2OT) (Air Force); Lost National semifinal, 4–5 (Boston University)
2009–10	Hockey East	27	9	11	7	–	–	–	25	8th	39	17	15	7	.526	Won Quarterfinal series, 2–1 (New Hampshire); Lost Semifinal, 0–3 (Boston College)	Lost Regional semifinal, 2–3 (Wisconsin)
2010–11	Hockey East	27	6	14	7	–	–	–	19	7th	36	8	20	8	.333	Lost Quarterfinal series, 0–2 (New Hampshire)	
2011–12	Hockey East	27	3	23	1	–	–	–	7	10th	34	6	27	1	.191		
2012–13	Hockey East	27	8	13	6	–	–	–	22	T–7th	36	11	19	6	.389	Lost Quarterfinal series, 0–2 (Boston College)	
2013–14	Hockey East	20	10	10	0	–	–	–	20	T–7th	38	20	15	3	.566	Won Opening Round, 2–1 (Massachusetts); Lost Quarterfinal series, 1–2 (Massachusetts–Lowell)	Lost Regional semifinal, 2–5 (Union)
2014–15	Hockey East	22	10	9	3	–	–	–	23	7th	41	22	15	4	.585	Won Opening Round series, 2–1 (Maine); Won Quarterfinal series, 2–1 (Boston College); Lost Semifinal, 1–4 (Massachusetts–Lowell)	
2015–16	Hockey East	22	6	13	3	–	–	–	15	9th	40	15	22	3	.413	Won Opening Round series, 2–0 (Connecticut); Lost Quarterfinal series, 1–2 (Boston College)	
2016–17	Hockey East	22	10	8	4	–	–	–	24	6th	38	20	13	5	.592	Won Opening Round series, 2–0 (Maine); Lost Quarterfinal series, 0–2 (Boston College)	
2017–18	Hockey East	24	6	12	6	–	–	–	18	9th	37	10	20	7	.365	Lost Opening Round series, 1–2 (Massachusetts)	
2018–19	Hockey East	24	5	16	3	–	–	–	13	10th	34	12	19	3	.397		
2019–20	Hockey East	24	2	18	4	–	–	–	8	11th	34	5	23	6	.235		
Todd Woodcroft (2020–2023)
2020–21	Hockey East	12	1	9	2	0	0	0	.139	11th	13	1	10	2	.154	Lost Opening Round, 3–5 (Massachusetts–Lowell)	
2021–22	Hockey East	24	6	16	2	3	1	2	20	10th	35	8	25	2	.257	Lost Opening Round, 1–2 (Providence)	
2022–23	Hockey East	24	5	16	3	2	1	1	18	11th	36	11	20	5	.375	Won Opening Round, 4–2 (Maine); Lost Quarterfinal, 3–7 (Boston University)	
Steve Wiedler (2023–Present)
2023–24	Hockey East	24	7	14	3	1	0	3	26	9th	35	13	19	3	.414	Lost Opening Round, 1–4 (Connecticut)	
2024–25	Hockey East	24	6	16	2	2	3	1	22	11th	35	11	21	3	.357	Lost Opening Round, 1–2 (Massachusetts)	
2025–26	Hockey East	24	8	15	1	0	0	0	25	11th	35	13	21	1	.386	Lost Opening Round, 1–4 (Boston University)	
Totals											GP	W	L	T	%	Championships	
Regular Season											1845	815	877	153	.483	3 ECAC 2 Championships, 1 ECAC Hockey Division Championship, 1 ECAC Hockey Championship	
Conference Post-season											115	46	66	3	.409	3 ECAC 2 tournament championships	
NCAA Post-season											10	3	7	0	.300	6 NCAA Tournament appearances	
Regular Season and Post-season Record											1970	864	950	156	.477		

* Winning percentage is used when conference schedules are unbalanced.
† The remainder of Vermont's season was cancelled after reports of a hazing scandal became public.
