= Herb Hammond =

American ice hockey coach and scout (1939–2009)

Biographical details
- Born: December 5, 1939; Boston, Massachusetts, U.S.
- Died: July 23, 2009 (aged 69); Fort Gratiot, Michigan, U.S.

Coaching career (HC unless noted)
- 1968–1980: Oswego State
- 1980–1982: Plattsburgh State
- 1982–1988: Brown
- 1988–1989: Minnesota North Stars (scout)
- 1989–2000: New York Rangers (scout)
- 2001–2002: Montreal Canadiens (scout)
- 2002–2005: Minnesota Wild (scout)
- 2005–2006: Port Huron Flags (general manager)

Head coaching record
- Overall: 264–253–12

Accomplishments and honors

Awards
- 1981 Edward Jeremiah Award

Herbert B. Hammond (December 5, 1939 – July 23, 2009) was an American ice hockey coach and scout who led Brown for six seasons before beginning a professional career in the NHL. Hammond started coaching at Oswego State in 1968 and remained there for 12 years before moving on to Plattsburgh State. He took the Cardinals to the NCAA Division II National Title Game both years he was there (Losing to Lowell each time) and soon was offered the head coaching job at Brown. After six poor years Hammond left to become an NHL scout for 17 years and had his name etched on the Stanley Cup as part of the New York Rangers win in the 1994 Stanley Cup Final. Hammond died in 2009 after a long fight with cancer.

== Head coaching record ==
Record table
Season	Team	Overall	Conference	Standing	Postseason
Oswego State Lakers (ECAC 2) (1968–1980)
1968–69	Oswego State	10–11–0			
1969–70	Oswego State	12–11–0			
1970–71	Oswego State	9–12–0			
1971–72	Oswego State	8–14–1			
1972–73	Oswego State	18–5–2			
1973–74	Oswego State	14–11–0			
1974–75	Oswego State	15–8–1			
1975–76	Oswego State	17–8–1			ECAC 2 Quarterfinals
1976–77	Oswego State	15–10–0			
1977–78	Oswego State	18–9–0			ECAC 2 West Quarterfinals
1978–79	Oswego State	13–15–0			ECAC 2 West Quarterfinals
1979–80	Oswego State	27–8–0			ECAC 2 West Champion
Oswego State:		176–122–5			
Plattsburgh State Cardinals (ECAC 2) (1980–1982)
1980–81	Plattsburgh State	27–4–2			NCAA Runner-Up
1981–82	Plattsburgh State	25–13–2			NCAA Runner-Up
Plattsburgh State:		52–17–4			
Brown Bears (ECAC Hockey) (1982–1988)
1982–83	Brown	3–21–1	2–18–1	16th	
1983–84	Brown	6–19–1	5–15–1	t-15th	
1984–85	Brown	9–17–0	6–15–0	9th	
1985–86	Brown	4–19–0	3–18–0	12th	
1986–87	Brown	11–16–0	9–13–0	8th	ECAC Quarterfinals
1987–88	Brown	3–22–1	2–19–1	12th	
Brown:		36–114–3	27–98–3		
Total:		264–253–12			
National champion Postseason invitational champion Conference regular season champion Conference regular season and conference tournament champion Division regular season champion Division regular season and conference tournament champion Conference tournament champion

Awards and achievements
Preceded by Steve Stirling	Edward Jeremiah Award; 1980–81	Succeeded by Steve Stirling
