= WCHL Tournament =

WCHL tournament (defunct)
- Conference hockey championship
- Sport: Ice hockey
- Conference: Worcester Collegiate Hockey League
- Format: Single-elimination, Two game aggregate
- Played: 1967–1972

The WCHL Tournament was an ice hockey tournament for the Worcester Collegiate Hockey League hosted from 1967 to 1972.

== History ==
The WCHL tournament began in 1967, at the end of the first season of league play. The teams with the four best conference records were arranged in a Single-elimination tournament where the winner was declared champion. In 1971 the league dropped from 5 to 4 members and the playoff was changed; the top 2 teams would play a two-game series where the team with the most goals scored was declared the champion. The following year the conference playoff became a single-game championship.

== 1967 ==
Seed	School	Conference record
1	Holy Cross	8–0–0
2	Nichols	6–2–0
3	Worcester State	
4	Assumption	

Semifinals; March 8
1	Holy Cross	7
4	Assumption	4
2	Nichols	8
3	Worcester State	5

Championship; March 9
1	Holy Cross	4
2	Nichols	3
Third-place game
3	Worcester State
4	Assumption

Note: * denotes overtime period(s)

== 1968 ==
Seed	School	Conference record
1	Holy Cross	8–0–0
2	Assumption	
3	Nichols	2–5–1
4	Worcester State	

Semifinals; March 4
1	Holy Cross	8
4	Worcester State	5
2	Assumption	3
3	Nichols	0

Championship; March 6
1	Holy Cross	10
2	Assumption	0
Third-place game
3	Nichols	5
4	Worcester State	6*

Note: * denotes overtime period(s)

== 1969 ==
Seed	School	Conference record
1	Holy Cross	7–0–0
2	Worcester State	
3	Assumption	
4	Nichols	3–5–1

Semifinals; March 11
1	Holy Cross	5
4	Nichols	2
2	Worcester State
3	Assumption

Championship; March 13
1	Holy Cross	7
2	Worcester State	2
Third-place game
3	Assumption	4*
4	Nichols	3

Note: * denotes overtime period(s)

== 1970 ==
Seed	School	Conference record
1	Holy Cross	6–1–1
2	Worcester State	
3	WPI	
4	Nichols	4–2–2

Semifinals; March 9
1	Holy Cross	3
4	Nichols	5
2	Worcester State
3	WPI

Championship; March 11
4	Nichols	7
2	Worcester State	2
Third-place game
1	Holy Cross	7
3	WPI	1

Note: * denotes overtime period(s)

== 1971 ==
Seed	School	Conference record
1	Nichols	5–0–1
2	WPI	

Championship; March 10, 13
1	Nichols	9	2	11
2	WPI	5	4	9

Note: * denotes overtime period(s)

== 1972 ==
Seed	School	Conference record
1	Worcester State	
2	Nichols	4–2–0

Championship; March 8
1	Worcester State	8
2	Nichols	5

Note: * denotes overtime period(s)

== See also ==
- ECAC 2 Tournament
