= Codfish Bowl =

U.S. college ice hockey tournament

- Sport: College ice hockey
- Founded: 1965
- No. of teams: 4
- Country: United States

The Codfish Bowl is an annual Division III college ice hockey mid-season tournament. It is the oldest tournament operating at the D-III level and the second oldest extant tournament for any level of play.

== History ==
In 1965 Boston State head coach Eddie Barry, looking for a lower-division answer to the Beanpot, founded the tournament with the help of athletic director Gus Sullivan. The series was used as a showcase for the smaller schools in college hockey and was absorbed by the program at Massachusetts–Boston when the two schools merged in 1982.

The tournament began before the NCAA instituted numerical divisions, but in 1973 it switched from College Division to Division II, where Boston State played. After the merger, UMB jumped up to ECAC D-II, allowing the tournament to remain at that level. In 1984, virtually all Division II schools dropped down to Division III, which is where the tournament has been played ever since.

The tournament was typically held before the New Year's Day, however, in recent years the championship has occurred both before and after January 1. This results in some years having two tournaments and others having none.

== Yearly results ==
Year	Champion	Runner-up	Third place	Fourth place
1965	Boston State	Salem State		
1966	Boston State	Salem State		
1967	Boston State	Salem State	Ohio	Massachusetts
1968	Boston State	American International		
1969	Boston State	Merrimack	Colby	Norwich
1970	Merrimack	Boston State	Colby	
1971	Boston State	Merrimack	Salem State	Norwich
1972	Saint Anselm	Boston State	Salem State	
1973	Salem State	Boston State	Saint Anselm	American International
1974	Salem State	Saint Anselm	Boston State	
1975	Merrimack	Boston State	Salem State	Saint Anselm
1976	Lowell	Boston State	Salem State	
1977	Salem State	Boston State	Saint Anselm	Lowell
1978	Lowell	Boston State	Salem State	
1979	Lowell	Westfield State	Babson	Boston State
1980	Westfield State	Norwich	Babson	Boston State
1981	Babson	Westfield State	Norwich	Boston State
1982	Westfield State	American International	Massachusetts–Boston	Worcester State
1983	Massachusetts–Boston	Babson	Westfield State, North Adams State ?	
1984	Saint Anselm	Massachusetts–Boston	Babson	Westfield State
1985	Salem State	Massachusetts–Boston	Norwich	Saint Anselm
1986	Bowdoin	Saint Anselm	Massachusetts–Boston, Salem State (tie)	
1987	Elmira	Massachusetts–Boston	Salem State	Holy Cross
1988	Bowdoin	Massachusetts–Boston	Elmira	Salem State
1989	Salem State	Massachusetts–Boston	Norwich	Saint Anselm
1990	Salem State	Massachusetts–Boston	Hamilton	
1991	Salem State	North Adams State	Saint Anselm	Massachusetts–Boston
1992	Connecticut	American International	Elmira	Massachusetts–Boston
1993	Salem State	Williams	American International	Massachusetts–Boston
1994	Hamilton	New England College	Massachusetts–Boston	Amherst
1995	Babson	Massachusetts–Boston	Gustavus Adolphus, American International (tie)	
1996	Norwich	Massachusetts–Boston	Gustavus Adolphus	Framingham State
1997	Massachusetts–Boston	Saint Anselm	Potsdam State	Southern Maine
1998	Saint Anselm	Massachusetts–Boston	Babson	Saint Michael's
1999	Amherst	Massachusetts–Boston	Saint Anselm	Fitchburg State
2000	Elmira	Massachusetts–Boston	Saint Anselm	New Hampshire College
2001	Fitchburg State	Massachusetts–Boston	Saint Michael's	Skidmore
2002	Babson	Southern New Hampshire	Saint Michael's	Massachusetts–Boston
2003	Skidmore	Massachusetts–Boston	Southern Maine	Worcester State
2004	Babson	Massachusetts–Boston	Saint Michael's	Fitchburg State
2005	Massachusetts–Dartmouth	Southern New Hampshire	Connecticut College	Massachusetts–Boston
2006	Skidmore	Massachusetts–Boston	Framingham State	Suffolk
2007	Massachusetts–Boston	Fitchburg State	Southern New Hampshire	Suffolk
2008	Westfield State	Fitchburg State	Suffolk	Massachusetts–Boston
2009	Suffolk	Massachusetts–Boston	Johnson & Wales	Southern New Hampshire
2010	Fitchburg State	Massachusetts–Boston	Wentworth	Assumption
2012	Tufts	Massachusetts–Boston	Johnson & Wales	Southern New Hampshire
2013	Massachusetts–Boston	Johnson & Wales	Wentworth	Fitchburg State
2014	Massachusetts–Boston	Southern New Hampshire	Tufts	Suffolk
2015	Connecticut College	Lake Forest	Massachusetts–Boston, Hamilton (tie)	
2015	Brockport State	Westfield State	Massachusetts–Boston	Johnson & Wales
2016	Salve Regina	Massachusetts–Boston	Connecticut College	Franklin Pierce
2017	Salve Regina	Massachusetts–Boston	Adrian	Williams
2019	Cortland State	Massachusetts–Boston	Tufts	Bryn Athyn
2020	Wesleyan	Massachusetts–Boston	Albertus Magnus	Fitchburg State
2021	Massachusetts–Boston	Post	Rhode Island	~~Franklin Pierce~~
2022	Massachusetts–Boston	Albertus Magnus	Tufts	Fitchburg State
2024	Connecticut College	Massachusetts–Boston	Worcester State	Suffolk
2025	Wisconsin–Superior	Massachusetts–Boston	Massachusetts–Dartmouth	Fitchburg State
2026	Massachusetts–Boston	Worcester State	Western New England University	Massachusetts College of Liberal Arts
