= 1966–67 NCAA College Division men's ice hockey season =

- Duration: November 1966– March, 1967
- NCAA tournament: 1967

The 1966–67 NCAA College Division men's ice hockey season began in November 1966 and concluded in March of the following year. This was the 3rd season of second-tier college ice hockey.

ECAC 2 added Boston State who was an NAIA school. Normally the conference would be forbidden to add a non-NCAA school as a member but because there was no national tournament for College Division schools no penalty was imposed.

== Regular season ==
=== Season tournaments ===
Tournament	Dates	Teams	Champion
Amherst College Tournament	December 17–19		
Yankee Conference Tournament	December 27–28	4	New Hampshire
Codfish Bowl		4	Boston State

=== Standings ===
1966–67 ECAC 2 standings
	Conference							Overall					
	GP	W	L	T	Pct.	GF	GA	GP	W	L	T	GF	GA
Norwich †	17	14	2	1	.853	74	59	24	15	8	1	94	109
Colby	12	9	2	1	.792	95	46	24	14	9	1	143	96
Middlebury	11	8	3	0	.727	74	34	21	11	10	0	103	73
Merrimack *	10	7	3	0	.700	70	37	22	13	9	0	123	94
Bowdoin	12	8	4	0	.667	70	37	20	9	11	0	88	87
Pennsylvania	6	4	2	0	.667	37	22	12	5	7	0	57	70
American International	17	10	6	1	.618	90	67	24	13	10	1	118	104
Hamilton	15	8	7	0	.533	89	74	19	8	11	0	99	101
Massachusetts	16	8	7	1	.531	77	85	20	8	11	1	83	124
Oswego State	2	1	1	0	.500	7	7	20	15	4	1	195	68
Williams	15	6	9	0	.400	64	61	19	8	11	0	82	80
Vermont	13	4	9	0	.308	55	66	19	5	14	0	69	105
Amherst	16	4	12	0	.250	65	118	15	5	10	0		
Connecticut	13	2	11	0	.154	37	89	16	6	10	0	59	98
Boston State	10	1	9	0	.100	25	71	24	10	14	0		
MIT	6	0	6	0	.000	8	49	14	4	10	0		
Championship: March 11, 1967 † indicates conference regular season champion * indicates conference tournament champion

1966–67 NCAA College Division Independent ice hockey standings
	Overall record					
	GP	W	L	T	GF	GA
Babson	12	7	5	0		
Illinois-Chicago	7	1	6	0		
Lake Forest	11	7	4	0	66	45
Oberlin						
RIT	15	7	7	1		
Salem State	16	11	4	1		
St. Cloud State	15	1	14	0	29	85
St. Olaf	13	9	4	0	–	–

1966–67 Minnesota Intercollegiate Athletic Conference ice hockey standings
	Conference							Overall					
	GP	W	L	T	Pts	GF	GA	GP	W	L	T	GF	GA
Gustavus Adolphus †	14	12	2	0	24			20	16	4	0		
Saint Mary's	14	11	3	0	22			20	14	6	0		
Saint John's	14	9	4	1	19			18	12	5	1		
Augsburg	14	9	5	0	18			16	9	7	0		
St. Thomas	14	7	7	0	14			17	10	6	1		
Macalester	14	5	9	0	10								
Hamline	14	1	12	1	3								
Concordia (MN)	14	1	13	0	2			14	1	13	0		
† indicates conference regular season champion

1966–67 Worcester Collegiate Hockey League standings
	Conference							Overall					
	GP	W	L	T	Pct.	GF	GA	GP	W	L	T	GF	GA
Holy Cross †*	8	8	0	0	1.000	58	15	24	16	8	0	126	111
Nichols	8	6	2	0	.750	41	28	13	7	6	0	62	53
Assumption								14	5	8	1		
Worcester State								12	2	9	1		
WPI													
Championship: March 9, 1967 † indicates conference regular season champion * indicates conference tournament champion

== See also ==
- 1966–67 NCAA University Division men's ice hockey season
