= 1967–68 NCAA College Division men's ice hockey season =

- Duration: November 1967– March 1968
- NCAA tournament: 1968

The 1967–68 NCAA College Division men's ice hockey season began in November 1967 and concluded in March of the following year. This was the 4th season of second-tier college ice hockey.

Four of the five members of the Worcester Collegiate Hockey League joined ECAC 2 with only Worcester Polytechnic Institute remaining outside. Because the five schools already held a tournament between themselves at season's end, none of the teams qualified for the ECAC 2 Tournament. This arrangement held until 1972 by which time two teams had left the conference and continuing with three members was not viable.

The NAIA began holding a national tournament in 1968. With ECAC 2 already holding a tournament for the vast majority of eastern schools, the NAIA received most of their bids from western schools with a few exceptions (Boston State and Salem State). The NAIA tournament would be the only national championship for non-Division I programs until the NCAA started holding the Division II Championship in 1978, after which the NAIA division declined until it was dropped as a sponsored sport in 1984.

== Regular season ==
=== Season tournaments ===
Tournament	Dates	Teams	Champion
Codfish Bowl	December 21–22	4	Boston State
Yankee Conference Tournament	December 27–28	4	New Hampshire
Boston Arena Christmas Tournament	December 28–30	4	Boston University
MIT Tournament	February 1–3	4	Connecticut

=== Standings ===
1967–68 ECAC 2 standings
	Conference							Overall					
	GP	W	L	T	Pct.	GF	GA	GP	W	L	T	GF	GA
Merrimack †*	11	10	1	0	.909	56	21	26	18	8	0	132	95
Colby	17	15	2	0	.882	97	37	27	20	6	1		
Hamilton	16	13	2	1	.844	93	45	21	15	5	1		
Vermont	18	12	6	0	.667	91	74	23	12	11	0	96	107
American International	15	10	5	0	.667	68	49	19	12	7	0		
Assumption	9	6	3	0	.667	25	23	18	8	6	2		
Middlebury	13	8	4	1	.654	59	29	22	11	10	1		
Bowdoin	15	9	5	1	.633	79	48	21	11	9	1		
RIT	5	3	2	0	.600	28	23	18	10	8	0		
Boston State	16	9	6	1	.594	71	53	26	16	9	1		
Holy Cross	17	10	7	0	.588	78	76	24	16	8	0	128	96
Oswego State	8	4	3	1	.563	62	32	21	10	10	1	143	83
Connecticut	18	10	8	0	.556	95	64	23	13	10	0	120	84
Salem State	11	6	5	0	.545	56	42	18	11	7	0		
Williams	14	5	8	1	.393	49	50	16	5	10	1		
Massachusetts	15	5	10	0	.333	70	87	20	5	15	0	76	114
MIT	12	4	8	0	.333	35	81	15	6	9	0		
Ithaca	12	2	10	0	.167	29	53						
Worcester State	6	1	5	0	.167	13	26	11	3	8	0		
Babson	7	1	6	0	.143	32	101	14	4	10	0		
Amherst	17	2	15	0	.118	52	118	15	2	13	0		
Norwich	19	2	17	0	.105	52	111	25	3	22	0	64	146
Nichols	10	1	9	0	.100	24	55	20	4	15	1	59	105
Championship: March 9, 1968 † indicates conference regular season champion * indicates conference tournament champion

1967–68 NCAA College Division Independent ice hockey standings
	Overall record					
	GP	W	L	T	GF	GA
Illinois-Chicago	17	12	5	0		
Iona	16	16	0	0		
Lake Forest	14	11	3	0		
Lowell Tech	15	7	7	1	85	84
Oberlin						
St. Cloud State	19	1	18	0	51	188
St. Olaf	15	5	9	1	–	–

1967–68 Minnesota Intercollegiate Athletic Conference ice hockey standings
	Conference							Overall					
	GP	W	L	T	Pts	GF	GA	GP	W	L	T	GF	GA
Gustavus Adolphus †	14	12	2	0	24			21	14	7	0		
Augsburg	14	11	3	0	22			19	13	5	1		
Saint Mary's	14	11	3	0	22			20	12	8	0		
Macalester	14	7	7	0	14								
St. Thomas	12	4	8	0	8			18	7	11	0		
Hamline	14	3	9	2	8								
Saint John's	13	3	9	1	7			20	7	11	2		
Concordia (MN)	12	1	10	1	3			17	1	15	1		
† indicates conference regular season champion

1967–68 Worcester Collegiate Hockey League standings
	Conference							Overall					
	GP	W	L	T	Pct.	GF	GA	GP	W	L	T	GF	GA
Holy Cross †*	8	8	0	0	1.000	47	12	24	16	8	0	128	96
Nichols	8	2	5	1	.313	24	30	20	4	15	1	59	105
Assumption								18	8	6	2		
Worcester State								11	3	8	0		
WPI													
Championship: March 6, 1968 † indicates conference regular season champion * indicates conference tournament champion

== See also ==
- 1967–68 NCAA University Division men's ice hockey season
