= WCHL =

WCHL may refer to:

- Western Canada Hockey League (1921–26)
- Western Canada Hockey League (1932–33) (minor pro)
- Worcester Collegiate Hockey League (1966–72) (second-tier NCAA)
- Western Hockey League (1968–78), also known as the Western Canada Hockey League
- West Coast Hockey League (1995–2003)
- Western Collegiate Hockey League (2013–)
- WCHL (AM), a radio station licensed to Chapel Hill, North Carolina, United States
- The WCHL (1996-) The Wheelchair Hockey League of Michigan.
