= 1970–71 NCAA College Division men's ice hockey season =

- Duration: November 1970– March, 1971
- NCAA tournament: 1971

The 1970–71 NCAA College Division men's ice hockey season began in November 1970 and concluded in March of the following year. This was the 7th season of second-tier college ice hockey.

== Regular season ==
=== Season tournaments ===
Tournament	Dates	Teams	Champion
Merrimack Christmas Tournament	December 17–18	4	Ohio
Codfish Bowl	December 26–27	4	Merrimack
Lake Forest Tournament	February 19–20	4	Cambrian

=== Standings ===
1970–71 ECAC 2 standings
	Conference							Overall					
	GP	W	L	T	Pct.	GF	GA	GP	W	L	T	GF	GA
Bowdoin †*	16	14	2	0	.875	94	34	24	19	4	1		
Vermont	16	13	3	0	.813	90	45	26	17	9	0	118	87
Massachusetts	16	12	3	1	.781	112	42	21	14	6	1	129	71
Buffalo	8	5	2	1	.688	45	31	14	7	6	1	76	67
Holy Cross	18	12	6	0	.667	102	104	19	13	6	0	106	106
Nichols	13	8	4	1	.654	62	52	24	16	7	1	132	93
Oswego State	11	7	4	0	.636	51	38	21	9	12	0		
Salem State	16	9	6	1	.594	76	64	19	11	7	1		
Hamilton	17	10	7	0	.588	89	84	19	12	7	0		
Norwich	18	10	8	0	.556	109	84	24	11	13	0	133	129
Worcester State	12	6	5	1	.542	69	62	18	11	6	1		
Amherst	13	7	6	0	.538	77	78	16	10	6	0		
Saint Anselm	13	7	6	0	.538	70	74	19	10	9	0	106	96
Merrimack	16	8	7	1	.531	68	72	29	12	16	1	112	145
American International	18	8	9	1	.472	99	107	21	8	12	1		
Lowell Tech	16	7	8	1	.469	109	112	18	9	8	1	125	112
MIT	10	4	5	1	.450	30	50	17	9	8	0		
Boston State	20	8	11	1	.425	93	98	23	9	13	1		
Middlebury	17	7	10	0	.412	72	65	24	11	13	0		
New Haven	14	5	9	0	.357	46	69	14	5	9	0		
Colby	20	7	13	0	.350	93	111	20	7	13	0	93	111
Williams	21	7	14	0	.333	83	95	22	8	14	0		
Connecticut	19	5	14	0	.263	50	116	23	7	16	0	62	143
Babson	12	2	8	2	.250	50	69	16	5	9	2		
Lehigh	6	1	5	0	.167	14	29	19	9	10	0	96	78
Bridgewater State	7	1	6	0	.143	20	42	7	1	6	0	20	42
Assumption	10	1	9	0	.100	23	64	18	5	13	0		
Ithaca	1	0	1	0	.000	1	7	1	0	1	0	1	7
Championship: March 13, 1971 † indicates conference regular season champion * indicates conference tournament champion

1970–71 NCAA College Division Independent ice hockey standings
	Overall record					
	GP	W	L	T	GF	GA
Alaska Methodist						
Buffalo	16	8	7	1	97	72
Hillsdale						
Illinois-Chicago	23	10	12	1		
Iona	21	13	8	0		
Lake Forest	23	14	9	0	141	88
Mankato State	18	15	2	1	90	48
New England College	21	16	5	0		
Oberlin						
RIT	16	7	9	0		
St. Cloud State	17	10	7	0	80	60
St. Olaf	14	3	11	0	–	–

1970–71 Minnesota Intercollegiate Athletic Conference ice hockey standings
	Conference							Overall					
	GP	W	L	T	Pts	GF	GA	GP	W	L	T	GF	GA
Gustavus Adolphus^{1} †	13	12	1	0	24	114	23	21	15	6	0		
Saint Mary's	14	11	3	0	22	67	40	20	15	4	1		
Concordia (MN)^{2}	12	10	2	0	20	67	46	26	19	7	0		
Augsburg	14	9	5	0	18	82	52	20	14	6	0		
Saint John's	13	4	9	0	8	28	69	22	9	13	0		
Hamline	13	3	10	0	6	44	58						
St. Thomas	14	3	11	0	6	47	66	20	7	12	1		
Macalester	14	2	12	0	4	38	133						
1 Gustavus Adolphus finished 13-1 in MIAC play. 2 Concordia finished 11-3 in MIAC play. † indicates conference regular season champion

1970–71 Worcester Collegiate Hockey League standings
	Conference							Overall					
	GP	W	L	T	Pct.	GF	GA	GP	W	L	T	GF	GA
Nichols †*	6	5	0	1	.917	42	24	24	16	7	1	132	93
Assumption								18	5	13	0		
Worcester State								18	11	6	1		
WPI													
Championship: March 13, 1971 † indicates conference regular season champion * indicates conference tournament champion

== See also ==
- 1970–71 NCAA University Division men's ice hockey season
