= 1984–85 NCAA Division III men's ice hockey season =

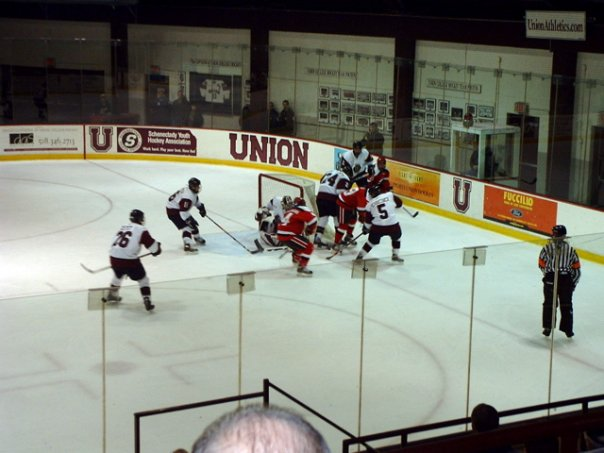
- Achilles Rink was the host of the 1985 Frozen Four
- Duration: November 1984– March 23, 1985
- NCAA tournament: 1985
- National championship: Achilles Rink; Schenectady, New York
- NCAA champion: RIT

The 1984–85 NCAA Division III men's ice hockey season began in November 1984 and concluded on March 23 of the following year. This was the 12th season of Division III college ice hockey.

After the collapse of the entire second-tier division in 1984, most programs downgraded to Division III. As a result the size of the third division rose dramatically.

Despite the SUNYAC conference not sponsoring ice hockey, the member schools began holding an informal conference tournament that took place just prior to the ECAC West Men's Tournament. All game were considered conference games for determining ECAC standings.

== Regular season ==
=== Season tournaments ===
Tournament	Dates	Teams	Champion
RIT Tournament	November 2–3	4	Wilfrid Laurier
Merrimack Tournament	November 17–18	4	Merrimack
Cardinal Classic	November 30–December 1	4	Plattsburgh State
McCabe Tournament	November 30–December 1	4	
Codfish Bowl	December 28–29	4	Saint Anselm
Syracuse Invitational	December 29–30	4	Colgate
Salem State Tournament		4	
Williams Invitational	January 4–5	4	Connecticut
Blue-Gold Tournament	January 5–6	4	Merrimack
Spurrier Invitational	January 18–19	4	Wesleyan
SUNYAC Tournament	February 22–23	4	Plattsburgh State

=== Standings ===
1984–85 ECAC 2 standings
	Conference							Overall					
	GP	W	L	T	Pct.	GF	GA	GP	W	L	T	GF	GA
East Region
Salem State †*	24	18	6	0	.750	109	77	33	24	9	0		
Babson	22	16	6	0	.727	123	58	31	22	9	0	173	95
Merrimack	21	12	6	3	.643	93	63	36	16	17	3	138	139
Norwich	22	13	9	0	.591	109	87	29	18	11	0	157	112
Holy Cross	21	12	9	0	.571	119	93	34	19	15	0	187	162
Connecticut	18	10	8	0	.556	78	85	24	14	10	0	104	112
Bowdoin	18	9	8	1	.528	86	60	26	13	12	1		
Saint Anselm	20	10	10	0	.500	96	105	26	13	13	0	128	131
New England College	22	10	12	0	.455	83	110	22	10	12	0		
Colby	19	8	10	1	.447	69	76	23	11	11	1		
Williams	17	6	11	0	.353	72	85	19	8	11	0		
Middlebury	18	5	12	1	.306	58	93	23	8	14	1	98	112
American International	21	6	15	0	.286			31	16	15	0		
Massachusetts–Boston	16	4	11	1	.281	63	85	25	10	13	2	122	113
Westfield State	16	2	14	0	.125	62	112	23	7	16	0		
West Region
RIT †	22	20	2	0	.909	180	54	33	26	6	1	223	89
Plattsburgh State	23	19	4	0	.826	174	71	37	26	11	0	250	129
Union *	19	14	4	1	.763	97	48	32	22	9	1		
Oswego State	28	20	8	0	.714	183	98	33	23	10	0	205	130
Elmira	23	16	7	0	.696	127	56	27	19	8	0	149	66
Geneseo State	29	19	9	1	.672	156	114	33	22	10	1		
Potsdam State	24	12	12	0	.500	121	109	28	14	14	0		
North Adams State	23	10	12	1	.457	86	99	26	13	12	1		
Canisius	21	9	11	1	.452			29	14	13	2	153	158
Brockport State	26	9	17	0	.346	105	163	26	9	17	0	106	160
Hamilton	19	6	13	0	.316	67	108	24	8	16	0		
Buffalo	23	4	19	0	.174	61	176	27	5	22	0		
Hobart	18	2	16	0	.111	61	191	21	2	19	0		
Cortland State	19	1	18	0	.053	50	191	24	1	23	0		
East Championship: March 8, 1985; West Championship: March 9, 1985 † indicates division regular season champion * indicates conference tournament champions

1984–85 ECAC 3 standings
	Conference							Overall					
	GP	W	L	T	Pct.	GF	GA	GP	W	L	T	GF	GA
Trinity †	16	14	2	0	.875	87	38	24	16	8	0	117	73
Iona	21	18	3	0	.857	157	65	28	21	7	0		
Southeastern Massachusetts *	18	15	3	0	.833	145	60	23	20	3	0		
Assumption	16	13	3	0	.813	96	54	21	15	6	0		
Fitchburg State	20	16	4	0	.800	163	84	28	17	11	0		
Curry	21	16	4	1	.786	130	75	27	21	5	1		
Hawthorne	14	11	3	0	.786	84	51	20	15	5	0		
Amherst	16	12	3	1	.781	96	59	24	15	8	1		
Framingham State	18	12	5	1	.694	103	85	28	13	14	1		
Quinnipiac	23	15	8	0	.652	137	101	29	15	14	0	149	151
Wesleyan	17	11	6	0	.647	100	66	22	12	10	0	114	93
Plymouth State	21	12	9	0	.571	115	95	22	12	10	0		
St. John's	18	10	8	0	.556	75	66						
Saint Michael's	18	10	8	0	.556	91	91	22	10	12	0	99	121
New Hampshire College	23	12	10	1	.543	140	108	25	12	12	1		
Roger Williams	17	9	8	0	.529	86	75	20	12	8	0		
Suffolk	18	9	9	0	.500	101	88	25	15	10	0		
Connecticut College	16	7	9	0	.438	69	60	20	8	12	0		
Lehigh	14	5	9	0	.357	75	101	19	8	11	0		
Bentley	14	5	9	0	.357	58	74	20	5	15	0	76	118
Villanova	18	6	12	0	.333	76	130	26	7	18	1		
Worcester State	17	4	13	0	.235	79	143	21	4	17	0		
Stonehill	20	5	15	0	.250	78	108	23	6	17	0		
Fairfield	22	5	17	0	.227	91	136	24	5	19	0		
Western New England	20	3	17	0	.150	83	148	23	5	18	0		
Keene State	18	2	16	0	.111	44	147						
Nichols	19	2	17	0	.105	48	147	21	2	19	0	51	165
Skidmore	15	1	14	0	.067	34	133	18	4	14	0		
Upsala	15	0	15	0	.000	32	110	19	1	17	1		
Championship: March __, 1985 † indicates conference regular season champion * indicates conference tournament champion

1984–85 NCAA Division III Independent ice hockey standings
	Overall record					
	GP	W	L	T	GF	GA
Lake Forest	26	17	9	0	130	82
St. Bonaventure	30	20	10	0		
Wisconsin–Stevens Point	22	4	18	0		

1984–85 Minnesota Intercollegiate Athletic Conference ice hockey standings
	Conference							Overall					
	GP	W	L	T	Pts	GF	GA	GP	W	L	T	GF	GA
St. Thomas †	16	14	2	0	28	100	51	32	25	7	0	197	107
Bethel	16	11	5	0	22	76	56	25	15	10	0	110	93
Gustavus Adolphus	16	11	5	0	22	88	70	30	16	13	1	150	133
Saint Mary's	16	11	5	0	22	110	91	26	14	12	0	168	156
Augsburg	16	9	7	0	18	89	84	26	14	12	0	152	141
Saint John's	16	5	11	0	10	92	98	26	7	19	0	136	153
St. Olaf	16	5	11	0	10	49	97	26	7	19	0	86	155
Concordia (MN)	16	3	13	0	6			26	6	20	0	107	189
Hamline	16	3	13	0	6	70	101	25	8	17	0	113	143
† indicates conference regular season champion

1984–85 Northern Collegiate Hockey Association standings
	Conference							Overall					
	GP	W	L	T	Pts	GF	GA	GP	W	L	T	GF	GA
Bemidji State †	18	14	3	1	29	107	58	35	27	6	2	204	114
St. Cloud State	18	9	7	2	20	79	71	29	14	13	2	142	127
Mankato State	18	8	7	3	19	80	69	35	19	12	4	188	125
St. Scholastica	18	8	10	0	16	77	84	30	14	15	1	127	140
Wisconsin–River Falls	18	8	10	0	16	77	86	27	15	11	1	136	116
Wisconsin–Superior	16	5	10	1	11	56	85	30	11	17	1	129	144
Wisconsin–Eau Claire	14	4	10	0	8	47	80	29	17	12	0	149	127
† indicates conference regular season champion

1984–85 NYCHA standings
	Conference							Overall					
	GP	W	L	T	Pts	GF	GA	GP	W	L	T	GF	GA
RIT †	18	17	1	0	34	161	36	33	26	6	1	223	89
Oswego State	18	14	4	0	28	147	58	33	23	10	0	205	130
Geneseo State	18	13	4	1	27			33	22	10	1		
Elmira	18	13	5	0	26	106	40	27	19	8	0	149	66
Potsdam State	18	9	9	0	18			28	14	14	0		
Canisius	18	8	9	1	17	85	101	29	14	13	2	153	158
Brockport State	18	8	10	0	16	90	104	26	9	17	0	106	160
Buffalo	18	4	14	0	8			27	5	22	0		
Hobart	18	2	16	0	4	61	190	21	2	19	0	78	212
Cortland State	18	1	17	0	2			24	1	23	0		
† indicates conference regular season champion

== 1985 NCAA tournament ==
Quarterfinals; March 15–17
Union	5	2	7
Babson	1	3	4
RIT	5	5	10
St. Thomas	4	2	6
Plattsburgh State	6	4	10
Salem State	1	2	3
Mankato State	4	2	6
Bemidji State	2	9	11

Semifinals; March 22
Union	2
RIT	3
Plattsburgh State	7
Bemidji State	8***

National championship March 23
RIT	5
Bemidji State	1
Third-place game
Union	9
Plattsburgh State	6

Note: * denotes overtime period(s)

== Drafted players ==
Round	Pick	Player	College	Conference	NHL team
11	212	Doug Greschuk ^{†}	Merrimack	ECAC East	Pittsburgh Penguins

† incoming freshman

== See also ==
- 1984–85 NCAA Division I men's ice hockey season
