= 1968–69 NCAA College Division men's ice hockey season =

- Duration: November 1968– March, 1969
- NCAA tournament: 1969

The 1968–69 NCAA College Division men's ice hockey season began in November 1968 and concluded in March of the following year. This was the 5th season of second-tier college ice hockey.

== Regular season ==
=== Season tournaments ===
Tournament	Dates	Teams	Champion
Codfish Bowl		4	Boston State
Yankee Conference Tournament	December 27–28	4	New Hampshire
Nichols School Invitational	January 3–4	4	

=== Standings ===
1968–69 ECAC 2 standings
	Conference							Overall					
	GP	W	L	T	Pct.	GF	GA	GP	W	L	T	GF	GA
Bowdoin †	16	12	3	1	.781	74	45	21	14	6	1	90	68
Merrimack	9	7	2	0	.778	37	29	21	8	13	0	76	96
American International *	18	13	5	0	.722	109	83	23	15	8	0	132	117
Colby	18	12	6	0	.667	79	49	21	13	8	0	90	64
Salem State	16	10	5	1	.656	116	67	18	12	5	1		
Norwich	16	10	6	0	.625	81	65	22	12	10	0	101	91
Holy Cross	17	10	6	1	.618	90	99	23	16	6	1	131	113
Connecticut	15	9	6	0	.600	77	61	22	12	10	0	110	100
Worcester State	5	3	2	0	.600	22	20	11	8	3	0		
Vermont	19	11	8	0	.579	79	61	25	13	12	0	91	88
Boston State	20	10	10	0	.500	140	79	23	12	11	0		
Hamilton	16	8	8	0	.500	105	92	18	8	10	0	116	107
Oswego State	12	6	6	0	.500	71	79	21	10	11	0	105	125
RIT	6	3	3	0	.500	35	41	27	17	9	1		
Middlebury	13	6	7	0	.462	63	51	22	9	13	0	109	106
Massachusetts	18	8	10	0	.444	90	66	21	9	12	0	92	84
Williams	15	5	9	1	.367	67	85	19	5	13	1	73	124
Lowell Tech	12	4	8	0	.333	74	89	13	4	9	0	78	96
Ithaca	9	3	6	0	.333	37	55	10	3	7	0	39	60
New Haven	6	2	4	0	.333	36	58	6	2	4	0	36	58
Babson	10	3	7	0	.300	38	60	15	7	8	0		
MIT	7	2	5	0	.286	39	45	13	5	7	1		
Nichols	6	0	5	1	.083	15	51	20	8	11	1	74	102
Amherst	16	1	15	0	.063	51	135	16	1	15	0		
Assumption	10	0	9	1	.050	17	81	17	4	12	1		
Championship: March 8, 1969 † indicates conference regular season champion * indicates conference tournament champion

1968–69 NCAA College Division Independent ice hockey standings
	Overall record					
	GP	W	L	T	GF	GA
Alaska Methodist						
Illinois-Chicago	16	12	4	0		
Iona	17	8	9	0		
Lake Forest	19	9	10	0		
Oberlin						
St. Cloud State	20	2	18	0	45	183
St. Olaf	21	6	15	0	–	–

1968–69 Minnesota Intercollegiate Athletic Conference ice hockey standings
	Conference							Overall					
	GP	W	L	T	Pts	GF	GA	GP	W	L	T	GF	GA
Gustavus Adolphus †	14	13	1	0	26			22	17	4	1		
Augsburg	14	11	2	1	23			19	14	4	1		
Saint Mary's	14	11	3	0	22			19	15	3	1		
Hamline	14	7	6	1	15								
Saint John's	14	6	8	0	12			16	6	10	0		
Concordia (MN)	14	4	10	0	8			17	5	12	0		
St. Thomas	14	3	11	0	6			18	8	9	1		
Macalester	14	0	14	0	0								
† indicates conference regular season champion

1968–69 Worcester Collegiate Hockey League standings
	Conference							Overall					
	GP	W	L	T	Pct.	GF	GA	GP	W	L	T	GF	GA
Holy Cross †*	7	7	0	0	1.000	47	15	23	16	6	1	131	113
Nichols	9	3	5	1	.389	36	43	20	8	11	1	74	102
Assumption								17	4	12	1		
Worcester State								11	8	3	0		
WPI													
Championship: March 13, 1969 † indicates conference regular season champion * indicates conference tournament champion

== 1969 NHL Amateur Draft ==
Round	Pick	Player	College	Conference	NHL team
7	72	Rick Thompson ^{†}	Bowling Green	MCHA	Minnesota North Stars

† incoming freshman

== See also ==
- 1968–69 NCAA University Division men's ice hockey season
