= 1992–93 NCAA Division III men's ice hockey season =

- Duration: October 1992 – March 27, 1993
- NCAA tournament: 1993
- National championship: Aldrich Arena; Maplewood, Minnesota
- NCAA champion: Wisconsin–Stevens Point
- Sid Watson Award: Frank Cirone (Wisconsin–Stevens Point)

The 1992–93 NCAA Division III men's ice hockey season began in October 1992 and concluded on March 27 of the following year. This was the 20th season of Division III college ice hockey.

The NCAA restarted the Division II Championship for this season and all programs from Division II schools were required to submit bids to the second-tier championship despite continuing to play in a majority Division III conference. Due to the low number and sometimes vast distance between the schools, no Division II conferences were formed, even from the few programs that became independent. The records for all Division II schools that remained in their previous conferences are listed here.

Due in part to this new arrangement, ECAC West split and the State University of New York Athletic Conference began officially sponsoring ice hockey. While both conferences, along with ECAC East fell under the ECAC umbrella, ECAC East stopped counting inter-conference games in their standings while ECAC West continued to count games against SUNYAC teams for this season before dropping the practice entirely. The SUNYAC had already been holding a conference schedule to determine which teams participated in the SUNYAC tournament and the conference simply stopped counting non-SUNYAC games for their standings.

The NCAA began naming a national Division III player of the year, a counterpart to the Hobey Baker Award.

== Regular season ==
=== Season tournaments ===
Tournament	Dates	Teams	Champion
Ira S. Wilson Invitational	October 30–31	4	Canisius
Cardinal Classic	November 6–7	4	Salem State
RIT Tournament	November 6–7	4	Wisconsin–Stevens Point
Elmira Tournament	November 13–14	4	Elmira
Crusader Classic	November 28–29	4	Holy Cross
McCabe Tournament	December 4–5	4	Trinity
Codfish Bowl	December 29–30	4	Connecticut
Middlebury Tournament		4	Middlebury
Spurrier Invitational	January 15–16	4	

=== Standings ===
1992–93 ECAC East standings
	Conference							Overall					
	GP	W	L	T	Pct.	GF	GA	GP	W	L	T	GF	GA
Middlebury †	22	18	2	2	.864	150	74	24	18	4	2	154	83
Babson	23	17	5	1	.761			26	18	7	1	144	99
Connecticut	21	15	5	1	.738			27	19	6	2	135	100
Williams	22	16	6	0	.727			25	18	7	0		
Salem State	15	10	4	1	.700			28	19	8	1		
American International	22	13	6	3	.659			27	16	8	3		
Bowdoin *	23	13	8	2	.609			26	16	8	2		
Hamilton	23	13	9	1	.587			25	14	10	1		
Norwich	22	12	10	0	.545	90	100	23	13	10	0	101	101
Holy Cross	22	10	11	1	.477			25	10	14	1	97	127
New England College	21	8	11	2	.429			25	11	12	2		
Massachusetts–Boston	18	7	11	0	.389			23	10	13	0	111	140
Connecticut College	19	5	13	1	.289			24	10	13	2	85	91
Trinity	19	4	13	2	.263	58	92	23	8	13	2	88	99
North Adams State	17	4	13	0	.235			22	8	14	0		
Saint Anselm	23	5	18	0	.217	68	116	24	6	18	0	77	120
Colby	23	5	17	1	.239			24	6	17	1		
Amherst	11	1	8	2	.182			23	12	9	2		
Championship: March 5, 1993 † indicates conference regular season champion * indicates conference tournament champion

1992–93 ECAC North/South/Central standings
	Division							Overall					
	GP	W	L	T	Pct.	GF	GA	GP	W	L	T	GF	GA
Central Division
Massachusetts–Dartmouth ~†*	14	13	1	0	26			25	21	3	1		
Suffolk	14	9	5	0	18			25	15	10	0		
Assumption	14	8	6	0	16			27	19	8	0		
Stonehill	14	8	6	0	16			23	13	8	2		
New Hampshire College	14	5	8	1	11			21	7	12	2		
Tufts	14	5	9	0	10			23	8	14	1		
Bentley	14	4	9	1	9	49	68	24	10	13	1	98	124
Saint Michael's	14	3	11	0	6	47	92	23	6	16	1	84	147
North Division
Southern Maine ~	16	14	2	0	28	84	44	28	18	9	1	121	94
Framingham State	16	11	4	1	23			24	14	9	1		
Plymouth State	16	10	4	2	22			25	15	7	3		
Fitchburg State	16	10	4	2	22	84	57	23	11	10	2	108	104
Roger Williams	16	6	8	2	14			23	9	11	3		
Western New England	16	6	8	2	14			23	8	13	2		
Worcester State	16	5	10	1	11			24	7	16	1		
Curry	16	3	13	0	6			20	6	14	0		
Nichols	16	2	14	0	4	56	125	24	4	20	0	95	187
South Division
Iona ~	10	7	3	0	.700			24	12	11	1		
Fairfield	11	7	4	0	.636			20	10	10	0		
Skidmore	11	6	4	1	.591			23	12	9	2		
Villanova	11	6	4	1	.591			23	7	13	2		
Wesleyan	11	5	6	0	.455			23	5	18	0	70	146
Quinnipiac	11	3	8	0	.273	53	62	18	4	14	0	79	122
Wentworth	5	0	5	0	.000			19	2	17	0	78	195
Championship: March 10, 1993; ~ indicates division regular season champions † indicates conference regular season champion * indicates conference tournament champion

1992–93 ECAC West standings
	Conference							Overall					
	GP	W	L	T	Pct.	GF	GA	GP	W	L	T	GF	GA
Mercyhurst †	18	15	3	0	.833	146	49	28	18	10	0	185	100
Elmira *	24	19	5	0	.792	172	86	33	26	7	0	191	117
Canisius	24	17	6	1	.729	140	75	30	18	11	1	157	104
Hobart	24	14	10	0	.583			26	14	12	0	131	126
RIT	24	11	12	1	.479	121	101	25	11	13	1	123	109
St. Bonaventure	23	4	19	0	.174			25	4	21	0		
Scranton	24	0	24	0	.000			25	0	25	0		
Championship: March 6, 1993 † indicates conference regular season champion * indicates conference tournament champions

1992–93 NCAA Division III Independent ice hockey standings
	Overall record					
	GP	W	L	T	GF	GA
Lawrence	6	2	4	0		
St. Norbert	25	10	15	0	135	161
St. Scholastica	23	11	12	0		

1992–93 Minnesota Intercollegiate Athletic Conference ice hockey standings
	Conference							Overall					
	GP	W	L	T	Pts	GF	GA	GP	W	L	T	GF	GA
St. Thomas †	16	13	2	1	27	95	49	27	21	5	1	165	88
Gustavus Adolphus †*	16	13	2	1	27	91	47	29	22	6	1	155	99
Saint Mary's	16	12	4	0	24	88	51	25	17	9	0	138	84
Augsburg	16	8	8	0	16	76	74	26	11	15	0	123	135
Concordia (MN)	16	6	9	1	13	78	65	24	10	13	1	126	108
Hamline	16	5	9	2	12	69	86	21	8	11	2	98	114
Saint John's	16	5	10	1	11	51	66	24	8	15	1	82	97
St. Olaf	16	5	10	1	11	74	78	24	11	12	1	124	110
Bethel	16	1	14	1	3	42	125	23	1	21	1	71	189
Championship: March 6, 1993 † indicates conference regular season champion * indicates conference tournament champion

1992–93 Northern Collegiate Hockey Association standings
	Conference							Overall					
	GP	W	L	T	Pts	GF	GA	GP	W	L	T	GF	GA
Wisconsin–Stevens Point †*	20	17	1	2	36	105	60	32	25	5	2	171	111
Bemidji State	20	14	6	0	28	114	75	31	24	7	0	190	111
Wisconsin–River Falls	20	10	9	1	21	88	87	33	19	13	1	149	127
Wisconsin–Superior ^	20	9	11	0	18	94	81	30	14	14	2	134	111
Lake Forest	20	5	15	0	10	50	88	26	8	17	1	79	108
Wisconsin–Eau Claire	20	3	16	1	7	59	113	26	6	19	1	80	134
Championship: March 6, 1993 † indicates conference regular season champion * indicates conference tournament champion^ Wisconsin–Superior was forced to forfeit their first three games of the season

1992–93 State University of New York Athletic Conference ice hockey standings
	Conference							Overall					
	GP	W	L	T	PTS	GF	GA	GP	W	L	T	GF	GA
Plattsburgh State †*	12	11	0	1	23	92	34	33	25	6	2	219	128
Cortland State	12	8	4	0	16								
Fredonia State	12	7	4	1	15			27	11	15	1		
Oswego State	12	5	7	0	10	44	49	27	12	14	1	129	111
Potsdam State	12	4	7	1	9			24	8	14	2		
Brockport State	12	4	8	0	8	54	71	25	7	17	1	101	145
Geneseo State	12	1	10	1	2			25	5	18	2		
Championship: March 6, 1993 † indicates conference regular season champion * indicates conference tournament champions

Note: Mini-game are not included in final standings

== 1993 NCAA tournament ==
Quarterfinals; March 12–13
Plattsburgh State	5	9	-
Babson	2	4	-
Wisconsin–River Falls	5	4	-
Gustavus Adolphus	2	2	-
Salem State	6	4	0
Elmira	2	10	4
Wisconsin–Stevens Point	5	3	2
Wisconsin–Superior	3	8	0

Semifinals; March 26
Plattsburgh State	2
Wisconsin–River Falls	4
Elmira	2
Wisconsin–Stevens Point	7

National championship March 27
Wisconsin–River Falls	3
Wisconsin–Stevens Point	4*
Third-place game
Plattsburgh State	3
Elmira	8

Note: * denotes overtime period(s)

== See also ==
- 1992–93 NCAA Division I men's ice hockey season
- 1992–93 NCAA Division II men's ice hockey season
