= 1995–96 NCAA Division III men's ice hockey season =

American college ice hockey season

- Duration: October 1995– March 16, 1996
- NCAA tournament: 1996
- National championship: W.H. Hunt Arena; River Falls, Wisconsin
- NCAA champion: Middlebury
- Sid Watson Award: Ian Smith (Middlebury)

The 1995–96 NCAA Division III men's ice hockey season began in October 1995 and concluded on March 16, 1996. This was the 23rd season of Division III college ice hockey.

== Regular season ==
=== Season tournaments ===
Tournament	Dates	Teams	Champion
Buffalo State Tournament	October 27–28	4	
Ira S. Wilson Tournament	November 3–4	4	Buffalo State
Potsdam Classic	November 3–4	4	Potsdam State
RIT Tournament	November 3–4	4	RIT
Cardinal Classic	November 24–25	4	Army
Bowdoin Invitational	November 25–26	4	Saint Anselm
Spurrier Invitational	November 25–26	4	Connecticut College
Codfish Bowl	December 28–29	4	Babson
Colby Classic	January 5–6	4	Colby
Middlebury Tournament	January 6–7	4	Middlebury
PAL Tournament	January 12–13	4	Fitchburg State

=== Standings ===
1995–96 ECAC East standings
	Conference							Overall					
	GP	W	L	T	PTS	GF	GA	GP	W	L	T	GF	GA
Middlebury †	19	17	2	0	34	111	35	20	26	2	0	159	46
Colby	19	16	3	0	32			25	19	6	0		
Bowdoin	18	15	3	1	31			26	18	7	1		
Babson	19	13	4	2	28	79	66	26	18	6	2	108	88
Salem State	19	14	5	0	28			27	17	9	1		
Amherst *	19	13	6	0	26			26	17	9	0		
Connecticut College	19	12	6	1	25	92	69	24	16	7	1	118	90
Hamilton	19	10	8	1	21			27	15	11	1		
Williams	19	10	8	1	21			25	11	13	1		
Connecticut	19	10	8	1	21	91	67	26	16	9	1	134	86
Holy Cross	19	9	8	2	20	71	74	26	13	11	2	108	96
Norwich	19	8	11	0	16			24	12	12	0	113	119
Trinity	19	7	11	1	15			22	8	12	2		
Massachusetts–Boston	19	6	12	1	13	81	115	23	9	13	1	111	134
American International	19	6	12	1	13			24	7	15	2		
New England College	19	5	14	0	10			24	7	17	0		
Saint Anselm	19	4	15	0	8	77	91	24	8	16	0	95	115
North Adams State	19	3	14	2	8			24	6	16	2		
Southern Maine	19	3	15	1	7	50	116	25	4	19	2	70	155
Wesleyan	19	1	17	1	3	43	140	24	4	19	1	64	163
Championship: March 5, 1996 † indicates conference regular season champion * indicates conference tournament champion

1995–96 ECAC North/South/Central standings
	Division							Overall					
	GP	W	L	T	Pct.	GF	GA	GP	W	L	T	GF	GA
Central Division
Massachusetts–Dartmouth ~†	14	14	0	0	28			27	25	2	0		
Bentley	14	9	4	1	19	105	58	27	15	11	1	171	121
Tufts	14	9	5	0	18			23	13	8	2		
Saint Michael's	14	7	6	1	15	82	54	24	12	11	1	120	91
Assumption	14	6	7	1	13			23	12	9	2		
Stonehill	14	5	8	1	11			22	10	11	1		
New Hampshire College	14	3	9	2	8	63	74	24	9	13	2	100	119
Suffolk	14	0	14	0	0			23	1	22	0		
North Division
Fitchburg State ~*	14	12	2	0	24			26	20	6	0		
Roger Williams	14	11	3	0	22			21	15	5	1		
Framingham State	14	10	4	0	20			23	12	12	1		
Nichols	14	7	7	0	14	68	59	19	8	11	0	84	81
Plymouth State	14	6	8	0	12			25	7	17	1		
Western New England	14	5	9	0	10			24	9	14	1		
Worcester State	14	3	11	0	6			24	7	16	1		
Curry	14	2	12	0	4			25	5	20	0		
South Division
Skidmore ~	12	10	1	1	21			25	17	7	1		
Fairfield	12	8	3	1	17			27	11	13	4		
Sacred Heart	12	7	4	1	15	59	39	24	11	11	2	106	100
Quinnipiac	12	6	3	3	15	46	39	27	11	12	4	89	97
Iona	12	4	8	0	8			25	9	15	1		
Villanova	12	3	7	2	8								
Wentworth	12	0	12	0	0	28	88	19	0	19	0	43	126
Championship: March 6, 1996; ~ indicates division regular season champions † indicates conference regular season champion * indicates conference tournament champion

1995–96 ECAC West standings
	Conference							Overall					
	GP	W	L	T	PTS	GF	GA	GP	W	L	T	GF	GA
RIT †*	8	5	2	1	11	44	30	32	25	6	1	182	96
Canisius †	8	5	2	1	11	37	28	27	18	7	2	143	76
Mercyhurst	8	5	3	0	10	48	27	27	18	7	2	182	76
Elmira	8	4	4	0	8	35	33	26	13	13	0	116	121
Hobart	8	0	8	0	0	13	59	24	4	18	2	62	151
Championship: March 2, 1996 † indicates conference regular season champion * indicates conference tournament champions

1995–96 NCAA Division III Independent ice hockey standings
	Overall record					
	GP	W	L	T	GF	GA
Lawrence	7	2	5	0		
Scranton	25	8	16	1		

1995–96 Minnesota Intercollegiate Athletic Conference ice hockey standings
	Conference							Overall					
	GP	W	L	T	Pts	GF	GA	GP	W	L	T	GF	GA
Saint John's †*	16	11	1	4	26	80	47	31	17	10	4	134	105
Gustavus Adolphus	16	12	3	1	25	96	55	25	16	8	1	129	90
St. Thomas	16	11	3	2	24	109	49	29	18	9	2	172	106
Saint Mary's	16	10	3	3	23	92	49	26	14	9	3	127	99
Augsburg	16	7	8	1	15	90	78	25	8	15	2	122	153
St. Olaf	16	6	9	1	13	53	74	24	8	15	1	76	109
Bethel	16	5	10	1	11	45	61	23	7	15	1	71	100
Concordia (MN)	16	2	14	0	4	52	106	25	3	21	1	80	165
Hamline	16	1	12	1	3	41	132	24	3	20	1	72	194
Championship: March 2, 1996 † indicates conference regular season champion * indicates conference tournament champion

1995–96 Northern Collegiate Hockey Association standings
	Conference							Overall					
	GP	W	L	T	Pts	GF	GA	GP	W	L	T	GF	GA
Wisconsin–River Falls †*	20	16	3	1	33	64	36	33	26	5	2	117	55
Bemidji State	20	13	5	2	28	87	71	29	16	9	4	123	104
Wisconsin–Superior	20	12	6	2	26	91	59	35	20	11	4	155	113
St. Norbert	20	9	9	2	20	87	74	28	12	13	2	113	100
Wisconsin–Eau Claire	20	7	12	1	15	60	80	27	10	16	1	85	114
Wisconsin–Stevens Point	20	7	12	1	15	59	76	27	11	14	2	84	99
Lake Forest	20	6	13	1	13	56	65	24	6	16	2	67	90
St. Scholastica	20	4	16	0	8	46	90	25	5	20	0	56	115
Championship: March 2, 1996 † indicates conference regular season champion * indicates conference tournament champion

1995–96 State University of New York Athletic Conference ice hockey standings
	Conference							Overall					
	GP	W	L	T	PTS	GF	GA	GP	W	L	T	GF	GA
Plattsburgh State †	14	13	1	0	26	100	44	29	20	6	3	170	93
Potsdam State *	14	11	3	0	22	67	41	30	18	10	2	140	104
Oswego State	14	10	4	0	20	80	42	27	15	12	0	142	101
Fredonia State	14	8	5	1	17	60	56	28	14	11	3	125	110
Cortland State	14	6	7	1	13	59	66	22	10	11	1	101	95
Geneseo State	14	4	10	0	8	39	56	24	7	16	1	71	88
Buffalo State	14	2	12	0	4	37	89	25	4	20	1	68	164
Brockport State	14	1	13	0	2	41	88	25	3	22	0	80	151
Championship: March 2, 1996 † indicates conference regular season champion * indicates conference tournament champions

Note: Mini-game are not included in final standings

== 1996 NCAA Tournament ==
Quarterfinals; March 8–9
Middlebury	2	5	-
Colby	1	1	-
Wisconsin–Superior	6	7	-
Saint John's	5	2	-
Wisconsin–River Falls	7	7	-
Bowdoin	1	3	-
RIT	6	5	-
Potsdam State	3	3	-

Semifinals; March 15
Middlebury	4
Wisconsin–Superior	3
Wisconsin–River Falls	1
RIT	2

National Championship; March 16
Middlebury	3
RIT	2
Third Place Game
Wisconsin–Superior	2
Wisconsin–River Falls	8

Note: * denotes overtime period(s)

== See also ==
- 1995–96 NCAA Division I men's ice hockey season
- 1995–96 NCAA Division II men's ice hockey season
