= 1971–72 NCAA College Division men's ice hockey season =

- Duration: November 1971– March, 1972
- NCAA tournament: 1972

The 1971–72 NCAA College Division men's ice hockey season began in November 1971 and concluded in March of the following year. This was the 8th season of second-tier college ice hockey.

== Regular season ==
=== Season tournaments ===
| Tournament | Dates | Teams | Champion |
|---|---|---|---|
| Billerica Forum Thanksgiving Tournament | November 25–26 | 4 | Merrimack |
| North Country Thanksgiving Festival | November 25–27 | 4 | St. Lawrence |
| Merrimack Christmas Tournament | December 16–18 | 4 | Merrimack |
| Codfish Bowl | December 26–27 | 4 | Boston State |
| Williams Tournament | December 28–30 | 4 | Massachusetts |
| Lake Forest Tournament | February 25–26 | 4 | Lake Forest |

=== Standings ===
1971–72 ECAC 2 standings
| | Conference | | | | | | | Overall | | | | | |
| | GP | W | L | T | Pct. | GF | GA | GP | W | L | T | GF | GA |
|---|---|---|---|---|---|---|---|---|---|---|---|---|---|
| Bowdoin† | 15 | 14 | 1 | 0 | .933 | 99 | 44 | 21 | 17 | 4 | 0 | 124 | 78 |
| Buffalo | 12 | 10 | 2 | 0 | .833 | 87 | 46 | 21 | 13 | 8 | 0 | 138 | 66 |
| Vermont | 15 | 12 | 2 | 1 | .833 | 110 | 41 | 26 | 17 | 7 | 2 | 152 | 85 |
| Massachusetts* | 18 | 15 | 3 | 0 | .833 | 120 | 46 | 26 | 19 | 7 | 0 | 156 | 78 |
| Merrimack | 16 | 12 | 4 | 0 | .750 | 95 | 66 | 25 | 16 | 9 | 0 | 127 | 102 |
| New England College | 10 | 6 | 4 | 0 | .600 | 48 | 40 | 21 | 16 | 5 | 0 | 152 | 68 |
| Williams | 19 | 10 | 8 | 1 | .553 | 87 | 89 | 20 | 10 | 9 | 1 | 89 | 93 |
| Boston State | 23 | 13 | 10 | 0 | .565 | 120 | 114 | 27 | 14 | 13 | 0 | 136 | 144 |
| Salem State | 20 | 10 | 9 | 1 | .525 | 87 | 93 | 23 | 12 | 10 | 1 | 108 | 102 |
| Saint Anselm | 13 | 7 | 6 | 0 | .538 | 65 | 48 | 20 | 14 | 6 | 0 | 138 | 66 |
| American International | 16 | 8 | 8 | 0 | .500 | 96 | 84 | 20 | 9 | 11 | 0 | 125 | 118 |
| Colby | 21 | 10 | 11 | 0 | .476 | 110 | 91 | 23 | 11 | 11 | 1 | 118 | 98 |
| Hamilton | 17 | 7 | 9 | 1 | .441 | 52 | 72 | 19 | 8 | 9 | 2 | 56 | 75 |
| Lowell Tech | 18 | 8 | 10 | 0 | .444 | 79 | 78 | 23 | 12 | 11 | 0 | 112 | 91 |
| Middlebury | 12 | 4 | 6 | 2 | .417 | 50 | 52 | 21 | 7 | 12 | 2 | 88 | 89 |
| Amherst | 13 | 3 | 10 | 0 | .231 | 44 | 92 | 19 | 7 | 12 | 0 | 76 | 113 |
| Connecticut | 15 | 4 | 11 | 0 | .267 | 48 | 103 | 26 | 11 | 15 | 0 | 103 | 152 |
| Norwich | 17 | 4 | 12 | 1 | .265 | 56 | 100 | 23 | 5 | 17 | 1 | 78 | 134 |
| New Haven | 9 | 2 | 7 | 0 | .222 | 25 | 63 | 24 | 15 | 9 | 0 | 148 | 100 |
| Oswego State | 13 | 2 | 10 | 1 | .192 | 41 | 71 | 23 | 8 | 14 | 1 | 98 | 122 |
| Ithaca | 6 | 0 | 5 | 1 | .083 | 18 | 34 | 11 | 4 | 6 | 1 | 48 | 49 |
| Holy Cross | 13 | 0 | 13 | 0 | .000 | 33 | 93 | 20 | 4 | 16 | 0 | 76 | 139 |
Championship: March 11, 1972 † indicates conference regular season champion * indicates conference tournament champion

1971–72 ECAC 3 standings
| | Conference | | | | | | | Overall | | | | | |
| | GP | W | L | T | Pct. | GF | GA | GP | W | L | T | GF | GA |
|---|---|---|---|---|---|---|---|---|---|---|---|---|---|
| Worcester State †* | 16 | 13 | 3 | 0 | .813 | 148 | 72 | 24 | 21 | 3 | 0 | | |
| Wesleyan^{1} | 16 | 9 | 7 | 0 | .563 | 53 | 52 | 21 | 9 | 11 | 1 | 107 | 113 |
| Babson | 17 | 6 | 11 | 0 | .353 | 64 | 96 | 20 | 8 | 11 | 1 | | |
| Nichols | 13 | 4 | 9 | 0 | .308 | 44 | 86 | 18 | 11 | 7 | 0 | 70 | 63 |
| Bridgewater State | 12 | 3 | 9 | 0 | .250 | 45 | 86 | 18 | 9 | 9 | 0 | | |
| Assumption | 9 | 1 | 8 | 0 | .111 | 19 | 94 | 15 | 3 | 12 | 0 | | |
| Lehigh | 5 | 0 | 5 | 0 | .000 | 8 | 29 | 18 | 7 | 11 | 0 | 75 | 105 |
| MIT | 10 | 0 | 10 | 0 | .000 | 20 | 60 | 17 | 2 | 15 | 0 | | |
^{1}Goal totals for Wesleyan's last game (a win) unavailable Championship: March 8, 1972 † indicates conference regular season champion * indicates conference tournament champion

1971–72 NCAA College Division Independent ice hockey standings
| | Overall record | | | | | |
| | GP | W | L | T | GF | GA |
|---|---|---|---|---|---|---|
| Alaska Methodist | | | | | | |
| Framingham State | 21 | 7 | 12 | 2 | | |
| Hillsdale | | | | | | |
| Illinois-Chicago | 16 | 9 | 7 | 0 | | |
| Iona | 16 | 13 | 2 | 1 | | |
| Lake Forest | 28 | 14 | 13 | 1 | 145 | 122 |
| Mankato State | 20 | 13 | 6 | 1 | 110 | 64 |
| North Adams State | 13 | 2 | 11 | 0 | | |
| Oberlin | | | | | | |
| Plymouth State | 11 | 9 | 2 | 0 | | |
| RIT | 20 | 11 | 9 | 0 | | |
| St. Cloud State | 16 | 7 | 9 | 0 | 74 | 69 |
| St. Olaf | 18 | 2 | 16 | 0 | – | – |

1971–72 Minnesota Intercollegiate Athletic Conference ice hockey standings
| | Conference | | | | | | | Overall | | | | | |
| | GP | W | L | T | Pts | GF | GA | GP | W | L | T | GF | GA |
|---|---|---|---|---|---|---|---|---|---|---|---|---|---|
| Gustavus Adolphus † | 14 | 12 | 2 | 0 | 26 | 118 | 30 | 21 | 16 | 5 | 0 | | |
| Saint Mary's | 14 | 11 | 3 | 0 | 22 | 94 | 36 | | | | | | |
| St. Thomas | 14 | 10 | 4 | 0 | 20 | 98 | 48 | 22 | 12 | 10 | 0 | | |
| Concordia (MN) | 14 | 10 | 4 | 0 | 20 | 124 | 47 | 20 | 13 | 7 | 0 | | |
| Augsburg | 14 | 7 | 7 | 0 | 14 | 80 | 77 | 21 | 11 | 10 | 0 | | |
| Hamline | 14 | 3 | 11 | 0 | 6 | 33 | 85 | | | | | | |
| Saint John's | 14 | 2 | 12 | 0 | 4 | 37 | 128 | 18 | 2 | 16 | 0 | | |
| Macalester | 14 | 1 | 13 | 0 | 2 | 27 | 170 | | | | | | |
† indicates conference regular season champion

1971–72 Worcester Collegiate Hockey League standings
| | Conference | | | | | | | Overall | | | | | |
| | GP | W | L | T | Pct. | GF | GA | GP | W | L | T | GF | GA |
|---|---|---|---|---|---|---|---|---|---|---|---|---|---|
| Nichols | 6 | 4 | 2 | 0 | .667 | 38 | 27 | 21 | 9 | 11 | 1 | 107 | 113 |
| Assumption | | | | | | | | 15 | 3 | 12 | 0 | | |
| Worcester State †* | | | | | | | | 24 | 21 | 3 | 0 | | |
| WPI | | | | | | | | | | | | | |
Championship: March 8, 1972 † indicates conference regular season champion * indicates conference tournament champion

== See also ==
- 1971–72 NCAA University Division men's ice hockey season
