= 1969–70 NCAA College Division men's ice hockey season =

- Duration: November 1969– March, 1970
- NCAA tournament: 1970

The 1969–70 NCAA College Division men's ice hockey season began in November 1969 and concluded in March of the following year. This was the 6th season of second-tier college ice hockey.

== Regular season ==
=== Season tournaments ===
Tournament	Dates	Teams	Champion
Merrimack Christmas Tournament	December 17–18	4	Notre Dame
Codfish Bowl	December 27–28	4	Boston State
MIT Invitational	February 5–7	4	
Oberlin Tournament	February 20–21	4	Lake Forest

=== Standings ===
1969–70 ECAC 2 standings
	Conference							Overall					
	GP	W	L	T	Pct.	GF	GA	GP	W	L	T	GF	GA
Bowdoin †	13	13	0	0	1.000	77	31	22	19	3	0		
Vermont *	16	12	4	0	.750	88	45	24	16	8	0	115	70
Oswego State	11	8	3	0	.727	72	56	23	12	11	0	119	116
Babson	11	8	3	0	.727	53	30	17	11	6	0		
Worcester State	9	6	2	1	.722	45	35	16	10	5	1		
Buffalo	7	5	2	0	.714	52	25	17	14	3	0		
Merrimack	13	9	4	0	.692	72	47	26	13	13	0	119	132
Middlebury	16	11	5	0	.688	93	62	25	15	10	0		
Nichols	8	5	2	1	.688	44	29	19	13	4	2	106	52
Massachusetts	15	10	5	0	.667	71	38	18	10	8	0	79	54
Colby	20	12	7	1	.625	103	74						
Lowell Tech	14	8	6	0	.571	78	66	17	11	6	0	90	71
Salem State	16	9	7	0	.563	108	70	17	9	8	0		
Connecticut	15	8	7	0	.533	61	62	20	11	9	0	81	88
Lehigh	5	2	2	1	.500	18	23	15	12	2	1	90	41
Holy Cross	21	9	11	1	.452	86	94	27	13	13	1	115	110
Boston State	20	9	11	0	.450	126	105	22	11	11	0		
Hamilton	14	6	8	0	.429	89	65	18	8	10	0		
Williams	16	6	9	1	.406	82	86	19	7	11	1		
Norwich	18	7	11	0	.389	82	87	22	9	13	0	110	104
American International	17	5	12	0	.294	80	124	20	5	15	0		
Saint Anselm	10	2	8	0	.200	28	56	11	3	8	0	31	58
Amherst	16	3	13	0	.188	53	137	14	3	11	0		
Assumption	10	1	9	0	.100	23	73	13	1	12	0		
MIT	10	1	9	0	.100	15	71	17	4	13	0		
Ithaca	8	0	8	0	.000	17	72						
New Haven	6	0	6	0	.000	19	57						
Championship: March 14, 1970 † indicates conference regular season champion * indicates conference tournament champion

1969–70 NCAA College Division Independent ice hockey standings
	Overall record					
	GP	W	L	T	GF	GA
Alaska Methodist						
Buffalo	16	13	3	0	121	55
Hillsdale						
Illinois-Chicago	17	11	6	0		
Iona	16	13	3	0		
Lake Forest	20	10	10	0	84	103
Mankato State	14	5	8	1	44	75
New England College	14	10	3	1		
Oberlin						
RIT	26	9	17	0		
St. Cloud State	17	7	10	0	77	70
St. Olaf	15	1	14	0	–	–

1969–70 Minnesota Intercollegiate Athletic Conference ice hockey standings
	Conference							Overall					
	GP	W	L	T	Pts	GF	GA	GP	W	L	T	GF	GA
Gustavus Adolphus †	14	14	0	0	28			23	21	2	0		
Saint Mary's	13	9	4	0	18			20	13	7	0		
Concordia (MN)	14	9	5	0	18			20	13	7	0		
Augsburg	14	6	8	0	12			16	8	8	0		
St. Thomas								18	8	9	1		
Saint John's								19	6	13	0		
Macalester													
Hamline													
† indicates conference regular season champion

1969–70 Worcester Collegiate Hockey League standings
	Conference							Overall					
	GP	W	L	T	Pct.	GF	GA	GP	W	L	T	GF	GA
Holy Cross †	8	6	1	1	.813	41	22	27	13	13	1	115	111
Nichols *	8	4	2	2	.625	44	31	20	8	11	1	74	102
Assumption								13	1	12	0		
Worcester State								11	8	3	0		
WPI													
Championship: March 11, 1970 † indicates conference regular season champion * indicates conference tournament champion

== 1970 NHL Amateur Draft ==
Round	Pick	Player	College	Conference	NHL team
6	73	Gerry Bradbury ^{†}	Bowling Green	MCHA	Los Angeles Kings

† incoming freshman

== See also ==
- 1969–70 NCAA University Division men's ice hockey season
