= 1994–95 NCAA Division III men's ice hockey season =

- Duration: October 1994– March 25, 1995
- NCAA tournament: 1995
- National championship: Nelson Recreation Center; Middlebury, Vermont
- NCAA champion: Middlebury
- Sid Watson Award: Charlie Gaffney (Bowdoin)

The 1994–95 NCAA Division III men's ice hockey season began in October 1994 and concluded on March 25, 1995. This was the 22nd season of Division III college ice hockey.

== Regular season ==
=== Season tournaments ===
Tournament	Dates	Teams	Champion
Brockport Invitational	November 4–5	4	Mercyhurst
RIT Tournament	November 4–5	4	Fredonia State
Cardinal Classic	November 25–26	4	Plattsburgh State
Holy Cross Tournament	November 26–27	4	Oswego State
Codfish Bowl	December 29–30	4	Hamilton
Middlebury Tournament	January 7–8	4	Middlebury
Spurrier Invitational	January 13–14	4	

=== Standings ===
1994–95 ECAC East standings
	Conference							Overall					
	GP	W	L	T	PTS	GF	GA	GP	W	L	T	GF	GA
Middlebury †	17	14	1	2	30	108	34	26	22	2	2	157	50
Bowdoin	17	12	4	1	25	107	62	26	19	5	2		
Connecticut	17	10	2	5	25	95	71	27	15	7	5	156	121
Williams	17	11	3	3	25	76	52	22	12	7	3		
Salem State *	17	12	5	0	24	92	66	25	18	6	1	160	94
Colby	17	10	6	1	21	102	64						
Babson	17	10	7	0	20	81	57	24	15	9	0	102	83
Hamilton	17	10	7	0	20	71	58	26	16	9	0		
Holy Cross	17	10	7	0	20	60	50	25	15	10	0	86	75
Trinity	17	9	6	2	20	82	82	24	14	8	2	110	106
Saint Anselm	17	9	8	0	18	62	69	24	9	12	3	83	108
Norwich	17	7	10	0	14	86	93	23	10	12	1	118	118
New England College	17	6	11	0	12	71	97	25	10	15	0		
Amherst	17	4	12	1	9	57	79	22	6	15	1		
Connecticut College	17	3	12	2	8	51	80	23	5	16	2	69	104
American International	17	2	13	2	6	55	109	25	4	19	2		
Massachusetts–Boston	17	3	14	0	6	55	105	24	5	19	0	87	153
North Adams State	17	1	15	1	3	44	121	23	1	21	1		
Championship: March 4, 1995 † indicates conference regular season champion * indicates conference tournament champion

1994–95 ECAC North/South/Central standings
	Division							Overall					
	GP	W	L	T	Pct.	GF	GA	GP	W	L	T	GF	GA
Central Division
Massachusetts–Dartmouth ~*	14	13	1	0	26			27	24	3	0		
Assumption	14	8	4	2	18			26	12	11	3		
Tufts	14	6	3	5	17			24	13	6	5		
Bentley	14	6	4	4	16	59	46	26	10	10	6	119	86
Saint Michael's	14	7	7	0	14	71	58	20	9	11	0	104	82
New Hampshire College	14	6	7	1	13	58	66	22	10	11	1	100	94
Stonehill	14	3	11	0	6			23	7	15	1		
Suffolk	14	0	12	2	2			22	3	16	3		
North Division
Fitchburg State ~	16	16	0	0	1.000			28	22	6	0		
Framingham State	16	11	4	1	.719			26	17	7	2		
Nichols	15	8	7	0	.533	71	73	23	11	12	0	95	133
Southern Maine	16	8	8	0	.500	69	60	25	10	15	0	90	113
Roger Williams	16	7	8	1	.469								
Worcester State	15	6	8	1	.433			22	8	13	1		
Western New England	15	5	10	0	.333			24	9	15	0		
Curry	16	5	11	0	.313			24	8	15	1		
Plymouth State	15	2	12	1	.167			25	5	19	1		
South Division
Skidmore ~†	14	13	0	1	27			24	20	3	1		
Fairfield	14	11	3	0	22	73	46	27	18	9	0	132	101
Wesleyan	14	8	5	1	17	71	44	24	8	15	1	93	128
Sacred Heart	14	6	8	0	12	53	61	24	10	14	0	89	120
Villanova	14	6	8	0	12								
Iona	14	5	8	1	11			25	10	13	2		
Quinnipiac	14	5	8	1	11	55	65	22	6	15	1	77	133
Wentworth	14	0	14	0	0	24	133	22	0	22	0	38	199
Championship: March 8, 1995; ~ indicates division regular season champions † indicates conference regular season champion * indicates conference tournament champion

1994–95 ECAC West standings
	Conference							Overall					
	GP	W	L	T	PTS	GF	GA	GP	W	L	T	GF	GA
Mercyhurst †*	8	6	1	1	13	45	31	28	23	3	2	168	88
RIT	8	5	2	1	11	41	29	28	16	9	3	151	109
Canisius	8	4	2	2	10	38	25	26	16	6	4	144	92
Elmira	8	2	4	2	6	43	50	26	9	13	4	129	153
Hobart	8	0	8	0	0	27	56	24	7	16	1	91	123
Championship: March 5, 1995 † indicates conference regular season champion * indicates conference tournament champions

1994–95 NCAA Division III Independent ice hockey standings
	Overall record					
	GP	W	L	T	GF	GA
Lawrence	1	0	1	0		
Scranton	22	1	21	0		

1994–95 Minnesota Intercollegiate Athletic Conference ice hockey standings
	Conference							Overall					
	GP	W	L	T	Pts	GF	GA	GP	W	L	T	GF	GA
St. Thomas †	16	12	3	1	25	113	62	29	18	10	1	169	112
Gustavus Adolphus	16	11	4	1	23	103	70	26	12	13	1	126	125
Saint Mary's *	16	11	4	1	23	90	58	31	18	11	2	147	126
Augsburg	16	10	4	2	22	105	72	25	14	9	2	137	118
Saint John's	16	7	7	2	16	68	60	25	10	12	3	101	99
St. Olaf	16	6	8	2	14	70	75	24	7	15	2	91	112
Concordia (MN)	16	5	9	2	12	69	93	23	6	15	2	91	135
Hamline	16	3	12	1	7	58	110	21	4	16	1	79	141
Bethel	16	1	15	0	2	41	105	23	3	19	1	65	153
Championship: March 5, 1995 † indicates conference regular season champion * indicates conference tournament champion

1994–95 Northern Collegiate Hockey Association standings
	Conference							Overall					
	GP	W	L	T	Pts	GF	GA	GP	W	L	T	GF	GA
Bemidji State †*	20	16	3	1	33	115	62	33	24	7	2	176	96
Wisconsin–Superior	20	14	5	1	29	102	58	33	23	9	1	166	93
Wisconsin–Stevens Point	20	10	5	5	25	71	61	33	13	13	7	107	110
Wisconsin–Eau Claire	20	12	8	0	24	86	84	27	16	11	0	119	114
Wisconsin–River Falls	20	10	6	4	24	76	53	33	19	10	4	127	94
St. Norbert	20	6	12	2	14	63	70	27	10	14	3	94	91
Lake Forest	20	5	13	2	12	61	66	26	6	18	2	72	96
St. Scholastica	20	0	20	0	0	39	150	27	1	26	0	57	189
Championship: March 4, 1995 † indicates conference regular season champion * indicates conference tournament champion

1994–95 State University of New York Athletic Conference ice hockey standings
	Conference							Overall					
	GP	W	L	T	PTS	GF	GA	GP	W	L	T	GF	GA
Fredonia State †*	14	12	2	0	24	93	40	34	25	5	4	190	100
Plattsburgh State †	14	12	2	0	24	105	57	32	20	9	2	194	111
Potsdam State	14	9	5	0	18	65	59	26	13	12	1	113	124
Oswego State	14	7	6	1	15	62	53	27	14	12	1	128	112
Cortland State	14	5	7	2	12	54	69	24	10	12	2	109	104
Geneseo State	14	4	10	0	8	48	81	25	8	17	0	108	143
Buffalo State	14	3	10	1	7	48	83	25	7	17	1	89	134
Brockport State	14	1	11	2	4	46	79	25	4	18	3	84	147
Championship: March 4, 1995 † indicates conference regular season champion * indicates conference tournament champions

Note: Mini-game are not included in final standings

== 1995 NCAA Tournament ==
Quarterfinals; March 10–11
Fredonia State	8	3	3
Salem State	2	8	0
Wisconsin–Superior	8	5	-
Wisconsin–Stevens Point	4	2	-
Middlebury	3	6	-
Plattsburgh State	2	1	-
Wisconsin–River Falls	5	5	-
Saint Mary's	1	3	-

Semifinals; March 24
Fredonia State	4
Wisconsin–Superior	3
Middlebury	3
Wisconsin–River Falls	1

National championship March 25
Fredonia State	0
Middlebury	1
Third-place game
Wisconsin–Superior	5
Wisconsin–River Falls	6*

Note: * denotes overtime period(s)

== See also ==
- 1994–95 NCAA Division I men's ice hockey season
- 1994–95 NCAA Division II men's ice hockey season
