= ECAC 2 tournament =

ECAC 2 tournament (defunct)
- Conference hockey championship
- Sport: Ice hockey
- Conference: ECAC 2
- Number of teams: 4–16
- Format: Single-elimination
- Played: 1967–1984
- Most championships: Bowdoin, (4); Lowell, Merrimack

The ECAC 2 Tournament was a college ice hockey conference tournament played from 1967 until 1984. For several years it was the only championship held for lower-tier college programs under the oversight of the NCAA and served as the de facto NCAA national championship until 1978.

== History ==
ECAC 2 began holding a conference tournament for the 1965–66 season with four teams invited to participate. Even after 5 teams left in 1971 to form ECAC 3 the league's membership had risen from 15 to 24 teams in the interim and the championship was expanded to eight. When ECAC 2 reached 32 member institutions in 1977–1978, the league elected to stage separate 8–team tournaments for each of its two divisions rather than establishing a single 16–team competition (East and West). This was partly done to guarantee the two tournament champions automatic bids to the NCAA Tournament which began play the same year. Some schools, however, either had policies that barred them from appearing in national tournaments or were ineligible to appear in a Division II tournament due to being primarily a Division I or Division III school. This arrangement held for 6 years before the entire Division II level of college hockey collapsed after 1983–84 and ECAC 2 was formally split into two separate conferences the following season.

== 1966 ==
Seed	School	Conference Record
1	American International	11–4–0
2	New Hampshire	11–5–0
3	Colby	8–4–0
4	Merrimack	4–4–1

Semifinals; March 8–9
1	American International	1
4	Merrimack	4
2	New Hampshire	1
3	Colby	2

ECAC 2 Championship; March 12
4	Merrimack	0
3	Colby	5

Note: * denotes overtime period(s)

== 1967 ==
Seed	School	Conference Record
1	Norwich	14–2–1
2	Colby	9–2–1
3	Middlebury	8–3–0
4	Merrimack	7–3–0

Semifinals; March 8–9
1	Norwich	3
4	Merrimack	12
2	Colby	4**
3	Middlebury	3

ECAC 2 Championship; March 11
4	Merrimack	6
2	Colby	4

Note: * denotes overtime period(s)

== 1968 ==
Seed	School	Conference Record
1	Merrimack	10–1–0
2	Colby	15–2–0
3	Hamilton	13–2–1
4	American International	10–5–0

Semifinals; March 6–7
1	Merrimack	6
4	American International	1
2	Colby	3
3	Hamilton	6

ECAC 2 Championship; March 9
1	Merrimack	5
3	Hamilton	4

Note: * denotes overtime period(s)

== 1969 ==
Seed	School	Conference Record
1	Merrimack	7–2–0
2	American International	13–5–0
3	Colby	12–6–0
4	Norwich	10–6–0

Semifinals; March 5–6
1	Merrimack	3
4	Norwich	5
2	American International	10
3	Colby	3

ECAC 2 Championship; March 8
4	Norwich	6
2	American International	7

Note: * denotes overtime period(s)

== 1970 ==
Seed	School	Conference Record
1	Bowdoin	13–0–0
2	Vermont	12–4–0
3	Middlebury	11–5–0
4	Merrimack	9–4–0

Semifinals; March 11
1	Bowdoin	9
4	Merrimack	1
2	Vermont	5
3	Middlebury	1

ECAC 2 Championship; March 14
1	Bowdoin	1
2	Vermont	4

Note: * denotes overtime period(s)

== 1971 ==
Seed	School	Conference Record
1	Bowdoin	14–2–0
2	Vermont	13–3–0
3	Massachusetts	12–3–1
4	Norwich	10–8–0

Semifinals; March 10
1	Bowdoin	8
4	Norwich	2
2	Vermont	2
3	Massachusetts	1

ECAC 2 Championship; March 13
1	Bowdoin	5*
2	Vermont	4

Note: * denotes overtime period(s)

== 1972 ==
Seed	School	Conference Record	Seed	School	Conference Record
1	Massachusetts	15–3–0	5	Salem State	10–9–1
2	Buffalo	10–2–0	6	Lowell Tech	8–10–0
3	Vermont	12–2–1	7	Boston State	13–10–0
4	Merrimack	12–4–0	8	Saint Anselm	7–6–0

Quarterfinals; March 4-5
1	Massachusetts	5
8	Saint Anselm	3
2	Buffalo	9
7	Boston State	5
3	Vermont	5
6	Lowell Tech	0
4	Merrimack	4
5	Salem State	2

Semifinals; March 7-8
1	Massachusetts	4
4	Merrimack	2
2	Buffalo	4
3	Vermont	0

ECAC 2 Championship; March 11
1	Massachusetts	8
2	Buffalo	1

Note: * denotes overtime period(s)

== 1973 ==
Seed	School	Conference Record	Seed	School	Conference Record
1	Vermont	16–0–0	5	Norwich	11–6–2
2	Bowdoin	11–4–1	6	Middlebury	9–7–0
3	Massachusetts	12–4–2	7	Williams	14–5–0
4	Merrimack	13–5–1	8	Saint Anselm	15–4–0

Quarterfinals; March 3-4
1	Vermont	6
8	Saint Anselm	2
2	Bowdoin	5*
7	Williams	4
3	Massachusetts	10
6	Middlebury	2
4	Merrimack	3
5	Norwich	2

Semifinals; March 6-7
1	Vermont	4
4	Merrimack	3
2	Bowdoin	9
3	Massachusetts	3

ECAC 2 Championship; March 10
1	Vermont	8
2	Bowdoin	1

Note: * denotes overtime period(s)

== 1974 ==
Seed	School	Conference Record	Seed	School	Conference Record
1	Vermont	15–1–0	5	Massachusetts	10–6–0
2	Salem State	18–3–0	6	Norwich	10–8–1
3	Merrimack	16–6–2	7	Williams	7–5–2
4	Boston State	13–9–2	8	Army	9–2–0

Quarterfinals; March 2-3
1	Vermont	10
8	Army	1
2	Salem State	9
7	Williams	6
3	Merrimack	4
6	Norwich	3
4	Boston State	4
5	Massachusetts	7

Semifinals; March 5-6
1	Vermont	4
5	Massachusetts	3
2	Salem State	2
3	Merrimack	7

ECAC 2 Championship; March 9
1	Vermont	6
3	Merrimack	2

Note: * denotes overtime period(s)

== 1975 ==
Seed	School	Conference Record	Seed	School	Conference Record
1	Merrimack	22–2–1	5	Salem State	15–7–0
2	Bowdoin	11–5–0	6	Saint Anselm	12–9–1
3	Middlebury	10–4–1	7	Army	12–7–0
4	Hamilton	13–5–1	8	Lowell Tech	13–8–0

Quarterfinals; March 1-3
1	Merrimack	4
8	Lowell Tech	2
2	Bowdoin	8
7	Army	4
3	Middlebury	5
6	Saint Anselm	4
4	Hamilton	6
5	Salem State	3

Semifinals; March 5-6
1	Merrimack	3
4	Hamilton	4
2	Bowdoin	3*
3	Middlebury	2

ECAC 2 Championship; March 8
4	Hamilton	4
2	Bowdoin	6

Note: * denotes overtime period(s)

== 1976 ==
Seed	School	Conference Record	Seed	School	Conference Record
1	Merrimack	21–2–0	5	Oswego State	13–6–1
2	Union	13–1–0	6	Hamilton	9–7–1
3	Bowdoin	13–3–0	7	Army	12–5–0
4	Salem State	15–5–0	8	Buffalo	9–4–1

Quarterfinals; March 5-6
1	Merrimack	7
8	Buffalo	4
2	Union	2
7	Army	3
3	Bowdoin	7
6	Hamilton	3
4	Salem State	3
5	Oswego State	1

Semifinals; March 9-10
1	Merrimack	8
7	Army	2
3	Bowdoin	4
4	Salem State	1

ECAC 2 Championship; March 13
1	Merrimack	5
3	Bowdoin	6

Note: * denotes overtime period(s)

== 1977 ==
Seed	School	Conference Record	Seed	School	Conference Record
1	Merrimack	20–2–1	5	American International	14–5–0
2	Union	11–1–0	6	Lowell	16–8–1
3	Bowdoin	13–2–0	7	Salem State	16–6–0
4	Army	14–2–1	8	Elmira	19–2–0

Quarterfinals; March 4-5
1	Merrimack	5
8	Elmira	1
2	Union	12
7	Salem State	6
3	Bowdoin	2
6	Lowell	4
4	Army	7*
5	American International	6

Semifinals; March 8-9
1	Merrimack	6
6	Lowell	2
2	Union	11
4	Army	4

ECAC 2 Championship; March 16
1	Merrimack	6
2	Union	4

Note: * denotes overtime period(s)

== 1978 ==
=== East ===
Seed	School	Conference Record	Seed	School	Conference Record
1	Bowdoin	13–3–1	5	Holy Cross	14–7–0
2	Merrimack	16–4–1	6	American International	13–7–1
3	Lowell	16–5–1	7	Saint Anselm	10–10–1
4	Salem State	17–7–0	8	Colby	9–12–1

Quarterfinals; March 4-5
1	Bowdoin	7
8	Colby	4
2	Merrimack	12
7	Saint Anselm	3
3	Lowell	6
6	American International	4
4	Salem State	4
5	Holy Cross	1

Semifinals; March 8-9
1	Bowdoin	4
4	Salem State	1
2	Merrimack	6
3	Lowell	3

ECAC East Championship; March 16
1	Bowdoin	3
2	Merrimack	0

=== West ===
Seed	School	Conference Record	Seed	School	Conference Record
1	Middlebury	11–3–0	5	Norwich	13–9–0
2	Elmira	18–4–0	6	Army	10–8–1
3	Plattsburgh State	16–3–0	7	Hamilton	11–8–0
4	Oswego State	16–8–0	8	Buffalo	12–10–0

Quarterfinals; March 4-5
1	Middlebury	7
8	Buffalo	3
2	Elmira	5
7	Hamilton	4
3	Plattsburgh State	6
6	Army	3
4	Oswego State	3
5	Norwich	5

Semifinals; March 8-9
1	Middlebury	5*
5	Norwich	4
2	Elmira	4
3	Plattsburgh State	3

ECAC West Championship; March 16
1	Middlebury	3
2	Elmira	6

Note: * denotes overtime period(s)

== 1979 ==
=== East ===
Seed	School	Conference Record	Seed	School	Conference Record
1	Maine	16–4–0	5	Bowdoin	10–7–0
2	Lowell	21–5–0	6	Holy Cross	15–8–0
3	Merrimack	20–5–0	7	New Haven	13–7–1
4	Salem State	18–8–1	8	American International	13–10–0

Quarterfinals; March 3
1	Maine	4
8	American International	1
2	Lowell	7
7	New Haven	3
3	Merrimack	4
6	Holy Cross	1
4	Salem State	4*
5	Bowdoin	3

Semifinals; March 7
1	Maine	4
4	Salem State	7
2	Lowell	7
3	Merrimack	6

ECAC East Championship; March 10
4	Salem State	1
2	Lowell	4

=== West ===
Seed	School	Conference Record	Seed	School	Conference Record
1	Plattsburgh State	22–2–0	5	Westfield State	14–4–1
2	Middlebury	14–4–1	6	Buffalo	11–8–0
3	Elmira	21–4–0	7	Oswego State	12–12–0
4	Norwich	15–8–0	8	Williams	8–10–0

Quarterfinals; March 3
1	Plattsburgh State	11
8	Williams	1
2	Middlebury	7
7	Oswego State	2
3	Elmira	5
6	Buffalo	4
4	Norwich	9
5	Westfield State	1

Semifinals; March 7
1	Plattsburgh State	5
4	Norwich	6
2	Middlebury	5
3	Elmira	3

ECAC West Championship; March 10
4	Norwich	1
2	Middlebury	2

Note: * denotes overtime period(s)

== 1980 ==
=== East ===
Seed	School	Conference Record	Seed	School	Conference Record
1	Bowdoin	14–2–2	5	Holy Cross	15–6–0
2	Lowell	19–4–0	6	Merrimack	14–8–2
3	Babson	15–7–2	7	New Haven	12–8–0
4	Salem State	19–6–0	8	Colby	12–8–0

Quarterfinals; March 1–2
1	Bowdoin	5
8	Colby	2
2	Lowell	8
7	New Haven	5
3	Babson	3
6	Merrimack	9
4	Salem State	1
5	Holy Cross	5

Semifinals; March 5
1	Bowdoin	4
6	Merrimack	5*
2	Lowell	4
5	Holy Cross	2

ECAC East Championship; March 8
6	Merrimack	4
2	Lowell	0

=== West ===
Seed	School	Conference Record	Seed	School	Conference Record
1	Elmira	18–2–1	5	Westfield State	12–8–0
2	Plattsburgh State	18–5–2	6	Army	15–10–1
3	Oswego State	16–7–0	7	Norwich	9–12–0
4	Middlebury	11–5–3	8	North Adams State	11–9–0

Quarterfinals; March 1–2
1	Elmira	5
8	North Adams State	7
2	Plattsburgh State	4
7	Norwich	3
3	Oswego State	12
6	Army	6
4	Middlebury	5*
5	Westfield State	4

Semifinals; March 5
2	Plattsburgh State	4
8	North Adams State	3
3	Oswego State	4
4	Middlebury	2

ECAC West Championship; March 8
2	Plattsburgh State	3
3	Oswego State	8

Note: * denotes overtime period(s)

== 1981 ==
=== East ===
Seed	School	Conference Record	Seed	School	Conference Record
1	Lowell	18–3–0	5	Bowdoin	11–7–0
2	Merrimack	17–6–0	6	Babson	11–9–0
3	Salem State	16–6–1	7	Holy Cross	11–11–0
4	New England College	14–6–0	8	Colby	13–8–0

Quarterfinals; February 28–March 1
1	Lowell	4
8	Colby	3
2	Merrimack	10
7	Holy Cross	7
3	Salem State	4
6	Babson	3
4	New England College	2
5	Bowdoin	3

Semifinals; March 4
1	Lowell	6
5	Bowdoin	3
2	Merrimack	5
3	Salem State	3

ECAC East Championship; March 7
1	Lowell	6
2	Merrimack	4

=== West ===
Seed	School	Conference Record	Seed	School	Conference Record
1	Oswego State	19–2–1	5	Norwich	14–8–1
2	Plattsburgh State	17–3–2	6	North Adams State	11–8–1
3	Elmira	18–7–0	7	Westfield State	11–8–1
4	Williams	10–3–3	8	Hamilton	6–10–3

Quarterfinals; February 28–March 1
1	Oswego State	6
8	Hamilton	4
2	Plattsburgh State	9
7	Westfield State	5
3	Elmira	13
6	North Adams State	5
4	Williams	3
5	Norwich	6

Semifinals; March 4
1	Oswego State	12
5	Norwich	5
2	Plattsburgh State	5
3	Elmira	2

ECAC West Championship; March 7
1	Oswego State	6
2	Plattsburgh State	7

Note: * denotes overtime period(s)

== 1982 ==
=== East ===
Seed	School	Conference Record	Seed	School	Conference Record
1	Lowell	19–1–0	5	Colby	12–7–2
2	Babson	16–5–1	6	Bowdoin	11–8–0
3	Merrimack	17–8–1	7	Salem State	14–11–1
4	New England College	15–9–1	8	Holy Cross	12–10–2

Quarterfinals; February 27–28
1	Lowell	8
8	Holy Cross	2
2	Babson	6
7	Salem State	3
3	Merrimack	7
6	Bowdoin	4
4	New England College	5
5	Colby	2

Semifinals; March 3
1	Lowell	3*
4	New England College	2
2	Babson	2
3	Merrimack	3

ECAC East Championship; March 7
1	Lowell	5
3	Merrimack	1

=== West ===
Seed	School	Conference Record	Seed	School	Conference Record
1	Oswego State	17–5–0	5	Williams	10–7–1
2	Plattsburgh State	18–6–1	6	RIT	16–7–1
3	Norwich	16–9–0	7	Elmira	11–11–0
4	North Adams State	16–7–0	8	Potsdam State	

Quarterfinals; February 27–28
1	Oswego State	5
8	Potsdam State	6*
2	Plattsburgh State	7
7	Elmira	3
5	Williams	3
4	North Adams State	5
3	Norwich	4
6	RIT	5

Semifinals; March 3
2	Plattsburgh State	11
8	Potsdam State	3
6	RIT	3
4	North Adams State	5

ECAC West Championship; March 7
2	Plattsburgh State	14
6	North Adams State	3

Note: * denotes overtime period(s)

== 1983 ==
=== East ===
Seed	School	Conference Record	Seed	School	Conference Record
1	Lowell	18–0–0	5	Salem State	14–8–3
2	Babson	15–4–1	6	Bowdoin	9–8–1
3	Holy Cross	16–7–1	7	New England College	13–10–0
4	Colby	11–8–0	8	Saint Anselm	9–11–0

Quarterfinals; February 26–27
1	Lowell	9
8	Saint Anselm	2
2	Babson	5
7	New England College	3
3	Holy Cross	14
6	Bowdoin	9
4	Colby	4
5	Salem State	5

Semifinals; March 2
1	Lowell	5
5	Salem State	1
2	Babson	6
3	Holy Cross	2

ECAC East Championship; March 5
1	Lowell	3*
2	Babson	2

=== West ===
Seed	School	Conference Record	Seed	School	Conference Record
1	RIT	20–4–0	5	Potsdam State	14–9–1
2	Oswego State	18–5–0	6	North Adams State	9–11–1
3	Norwich	14–7–0	7	Elmira	14–11–0
4	Plattsburgh State	16–8–0	8	Middlebury	7–9–1

Quarterfinals; February 26–27
1	RIT	3
8	Middlebury	5
2	Oswego State	9
7	Elmira	3
3	Norwich	3
6	North Adams State	5
4	Plattsburgh State	5
5	Potsdam State	2

Semifinals; March 2
2	Oswego State	8
8	Middlebury	2
4	Plattsburgh State	5
6	North Adams State	4

ECAC West Championship; March 5
2	Oswego State	9
4	Plattsburgh State	6

Note: * denotes overtime period(s)

== 1984 ==
=== East ===
Seed	School	Conference Record	Seed	School	Conference Record
1	Bowdoin	12–3–1	5	Merrimack	10–10–0
2	Babson	16–3–1	6	Colby	7–8–1
3	New England College	16–6–2	7	Salem State	10–11–3
4	Norwich	14–7–0	8	Massachusetts–Boston	7–9–0

Quarterfinals; February 28–29
1	Bowdoin	6
8	Massachusetts–Boston	4
2	Babson	6
7	Salem State	2
3	New England College	2
6	Colby	3
4	Norwich	7
5	Merrimack	4

Semifinals; March 3
1	Bowdoin	4*
6	Colby	3
2	Babson	3
4	Norwich	1

ECAC East Championship; March 5
1	Bowdoin	1
2	Babson	4

=== West ===
Seed	School	Conference Record	Seed	School	Conference Record
1	RIT	22–2–0	5	North Adams State	15–8–2
2	Oswego State	17–4–0	6	Plattsburgh State	14–11–0
3	Elmira	17–8–0	7	Potsdam State	14–10–1
4	Union	13–5–1	8	Hamilton	9–10–0

Quarterfinals; February 26–27
1	RIT	7
8	Hamilton	0
2	Oswego State	9
7	Potsdam State	2
3	Elmira	1
6	Plattsburgh State	6
4	Union	6
5	North Adams State	3

Semifinals; March 2
1	RIT	6
6	Plattsburgh State	2
2	Oswego State	3
4	Union	5

ECAC West Championship; March 5
1	RIT	3
4	Union	1

Note: * denotes overtime period(s)

== Championships ==
School	Championships
Bowdoin	4
Lowell	4
Merrimack	4
Vermont	3
Oswego State	2
Plattsburgh State	2
American International	1
Babson	1
Colby	1
Elmira	1
Massachusetts	1
Middlebury	1
RIT	1

== See also ==
- NEHC Men's Tournament
- ECAC West Men's Tournament
