= Worcester Collegiate Hockey League =

- Conference: NCAA
- Founded: 1966
- Folded: 1972
- Sports fielded: Ice hockey; men's: yes; women's: no
- Division: Division II
- No. of teams: 5 (1966-70), 4 (1970-72)
- Region: Massachusetts

The Worcester Collegiate Hockey League was an intercollegiate athletic conference affiliated with the NCAA's College Division. The league was created in 1966 between 4 schools from around Worcester, Massachusetts as well as Nichols College, a few miles to the south.

== History ==
In 1966 a few colleges in the Worcester, Massachusetts area began sponsoring ice hockey as a varsity sport. The schools immediately banded together to form the Worcester Collegiate Hockey League and included the already existing programs at Assumption College and Nichols College. After one season four of the members joined ECAC 2 as well but continued to hold their own conference tournament. Holy Cross left the conference in 1970 to play a more rounded schedule in ECAC 2 play and after a year the three remaining ECAC teams became founding members of ECAC 3. Worcester Polytechnic Institute dropped its ice hockey program after 1972 and the conference was dissolved.

=== WCHL Tournament ===
The WCHL held a conference tournament each year of its existence.

== Member schools ==
	Location	Athletic nickname	Enrollment^{#}	Colors	Founded	Joined	Left	Succeeding Conference	Current Conference^{†}
Assumption College	Worcester, Massachusetts	Greyhounds	2,753		1904	1966	1972	ECAC 3	Northeast–10
College of the Holy Cross	Worcester, Massachusetts	Crusaders	2,897		1843	1966	1970	ECAC 2	Atlantic Hockey
Nichols College	Dudley, Massachusetts	Bison	1,459		1815	1966	1972	ECAC 3	CCC
Worcester State College	Worcester, Massachusetts	Lancers	6,221		1874	1966	1972	ECAC 3	MASCAC
Worcester Polytechnic Institute	Worcester, Massachusetts	Engineers	4,177		1865	1966	1972	Dropped Program	

# enrollment in 2018
† as of 2018

== See also ==
- ECAC 2
