= WPI Engineers =

- University: Worcester Polytechnic Institute
- Conference: NCAA Division III; NEWMAC, NEWA, ECAC
- NCAA: NCAA Division III
- Athletic director: Dana L. Harmon
- Location: Worcester, Massachusetts
- Varsity teams: 18 teams
- Football stadium: Alumni Stadium
- Basketball arena: Harrington Auditorium
- Baseball stadium: New England Baseball Complex
- Mascot: Gompei the Goat
- Nickname: Engineers
- Fight song: "E to the X"
- Colors: Crimson and gray
- Website: athletics.wpi.edu
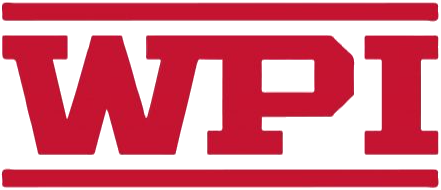

The WPI Engineers are the athletic teams of Worcester Polytechnic Institute. The school sponsors 20 varsity sports.

WPI teams participate as a member of the National Collegiate Athletic Association's Division III. The Engineers are a member of the New England Women's and Men's Athletic Conference (NEWMAC). Men's sports include baseball, basketball, cross country, football, rowing, soccer, swimming & diving, track & field and wrestling; women's sports include basketball, cross country, field hockey, rowing, soccer, softball, swimming & diving, track & field and volleyball.

== Sports Sponsored ==
Men's sports	Women's sports
Baseball	Basketball
Basketball	Cross Country
Cross Country	Field Hockey
Football	Rowing
Rowing	Soccer
Soccer	Softball
Swimming & diving	Swimming & diving
Track & field^{1}	Track & field^{1}
Wrestling	Volleyball
^{1} – includes both indoor and outdoor

== Men's sports ==
=== Baseball ===
The sport of baseball was played at the intercollegiate level on and off during the 1880s to the 1900s. During the years when WPI didn't have a sponsored team there would be contests between classes. Baseball was again introduced as a varsity sport in the spring of 1905 and has competed regularly since.

=== Basketball ===
The WPI Engineers men's basketball team dates back to the early 1900s and has competed regularly since 1915. The teams has four NEWMAC conference tournament championship (2005, 2006, 2013, 2022).

=== Football ===
The WPI Engineers football team has competed since 1887 and has the distinction of being Worcester's first college football team. The team has had three undefeated, untied seasons (1938, 1954 and 1983), two Freedom Football Conference (FFC) Championships (1992 and 1993), and one NEWMAC Championship (2019).
