= Salem State Vikings =

Athletic teams of Salem State University

- University: Salem State University
- Nickname: Vikings
- NCAA: Division III
- Conferences: MASCAC (primary); Little East Conference (field Hockey, men's and women's tennis and men's lacrosse); New England Hockey Conference (women's ice hockey)
- Athletic director: Nicole Wood
- Location: Salem, Massachusetts
- Varsity teams: 15 varsity teams (7 men's 8 women's)
- Basketball arena: Twohig Gymnasium
- Ice hockey arena: Rockett Arena
- Baseball stadium: Central Campus Baseball Field
- Softball stadium: Alumni Field
- Soccer field: Alumni Field
- Lacrosse field: Alumni Field
- Golf course: Essex Country Club (George Jacobson Golf Room for the winter and practice)
- Tennis venue: SSU Tennis Courts
- Volleyball arena: Twohig Gymnasium
- Colors: Blue, white, and orange
- Mascot: The Viking
- Website: www.salemstatevikings.com
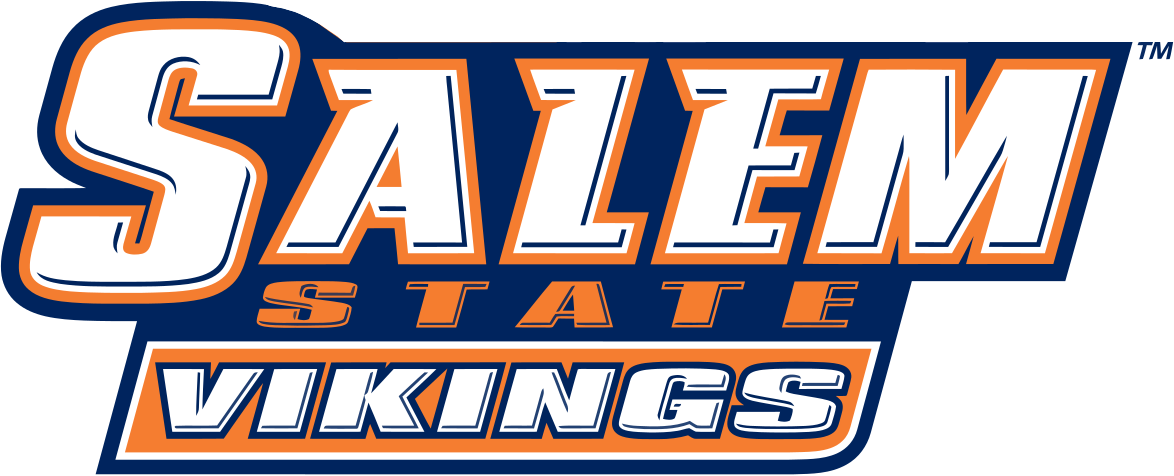

The Salem State Vikings are the athletic teams that represent Salem State University. The Vikings compete in NCAA Division III sports competition primarily as members of the Massachusetts State Collegiate Athletic Conference. The Salem State Vikings are also members of the Little East Conference in field hockey, men’s and women’s tennis, and men’s lacrosse, along with the New England Hockey Conference in women’s ice hockey.

== Sports ==
Men's sports	Women's sports
Baseball	Softball
Basketball	Basketball
Ice hockey	Ice hockey
Soccer	Soccer
Lacrosse	Lacrosse
Tennis	Tennis
Golf	Volleyball
	Field hockey

== National championships ==
=== Team ===
Sport	Association	Division	Year	Opponent/Runner-up	Score
Women's basketball (1)	NCAA	Division III	1986	Bishop (TX)	89–85
