= Assumption Greyhounds =

- University: Assumption University
- Conference: NE-10 (primary); NEWHA
- NCAA: Division II
- Athletic director: Eric Gobiel
- Location: Worcester, Massachusetts
- Varsity teams: 24 (11 men's, 13 women's)
- Football stadium: Brian Kelly Stadium
- Basketball arena: Andrew Laska Gymnasium
- Ice hockey arena: Worcester Ice Center
- Baseball stadium: H.L. Rocheleau Field
- Softball stadium: Normand R. Marois Field
- Aquatics center: Plourde Recreation Center
- Tennis venue: Assumption Tennis Courts
- Other venues: Donahue Rowing Center (women's rowing); Pleasant Valley Country Club (golf)
- Nickname: Greyhounds
- Colors: Blue and white
- Website: assumptiongreyhounds.com
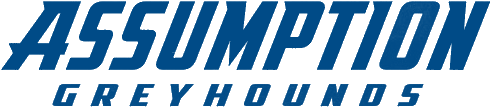

The Assumption Greyhounds are the athletic sports teams for Assumption University. They are a member of the National Collegiate Athletic Association, Division II. The Greyhounds are a member of the Northeast-10 Conference (NE-10) and the New England Women's Hockey Alliance (NEWHA), one of the five conferences that compete at the NCAA's National Collegiate level (the effective equivalent of Division I) in women's ice hockey. Assumption joined the NEWHA for administrative purposes in 2022 in advance of its first season of varsity women's hockey in 2023–24.

== Teams ==
Men's sports	Women's sports
Baseball	Basketball
Basketball	Cross Country
Cross Country	Field Hockey
Football	Golf
Golf	Ice Hockey (2023–24)
Ice Hockey	Lacrosse
Lacrosse	Rowing
Soccer	Soccer
Swimming & diving	Softball
Tennis	Swimming & diving
Track & field^{1}	Tennis
	Track & field^{1}
	Volleyball
^{1} – includes both indoor and outdoor

Assumption University finished in the top six of the Northeast-10 President's Cup standings in 2014–15, 2015–16 and 2016–17. In 2015–16 the department finished a program-best third after winning conference championships in football and swimming and earning a runner-up finish in field hockey. In the fall of 2017, the football program won its second NE10 Title in the last three years and reached the NCAA Quarterfinals, where the program fell to Indiana (Pa.). The women's cross country program, meanwhile, placed second in the NE10 Championship and earned a second straight bid to the NCAA Championships – where they finished 27th. Field hockey advanced to the NE10 Title game, falling to eventual national champion LIU Post.

== Facilities ==
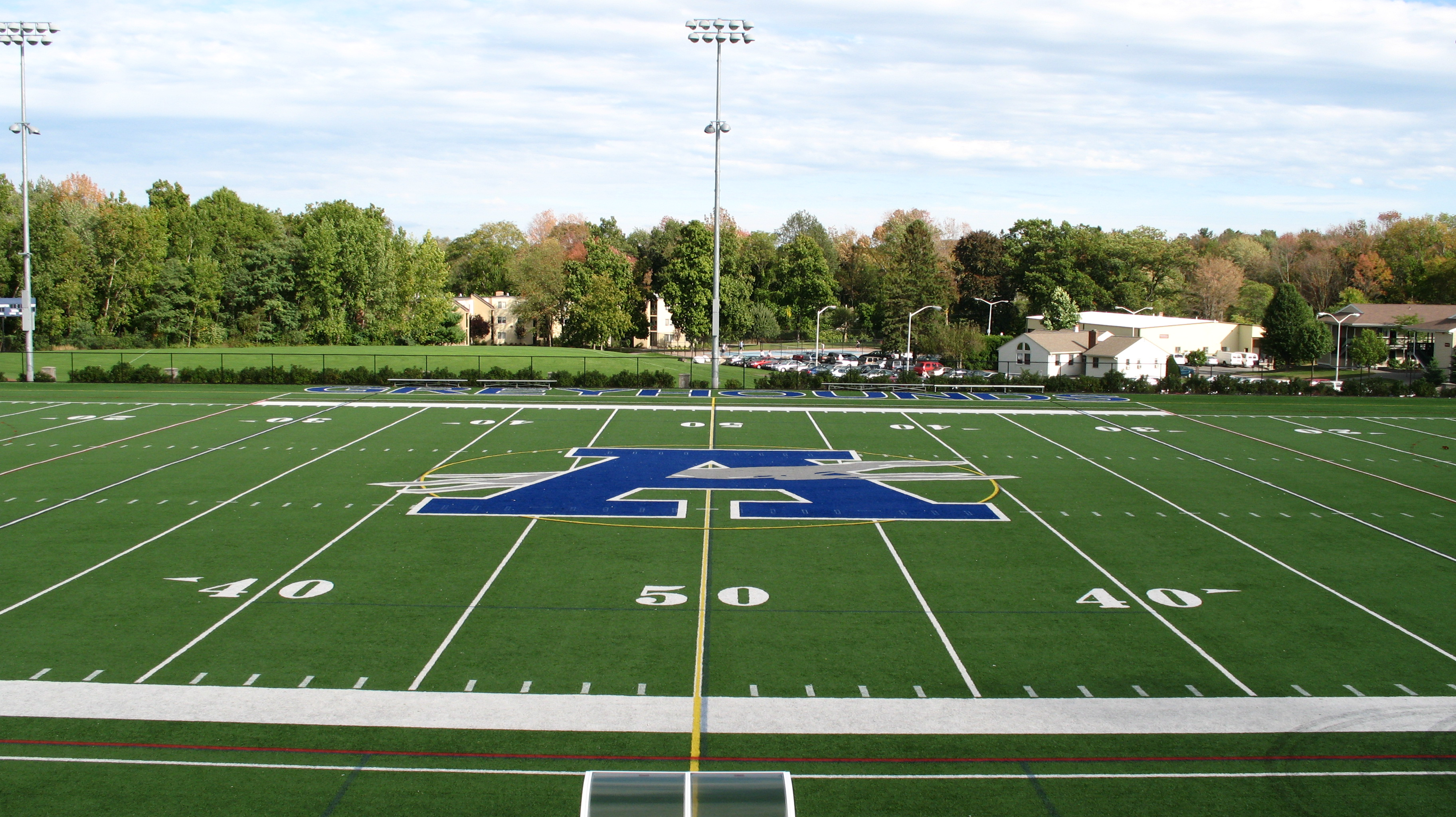
View of the multi-sport stadium at Assumption University

Assumption built a $3.2 million multi-sport stadium, which opened in September 2005. The stadium was the key capital project of the second phase of the Centennial Campaign. The stadium was constructed on the previous site of Assumption’s football/lacrosse field. The new facility supports six athletic teams (football, men's and women's lacrosse, men's and women’s soccer, and field hockey) and an outdoor intramural sports program on an infilled, synthetic turf field. It includes lights, elevated grandstand seating for approximately 1,200 spectators, a press box and a president's box.

== Notable alumni ==
- Deonte Harty – NFL wide receiver and All-Pro return specialist
- Jake Jones – NBA shooting guard
- Brian Kelly – Former Head Football Coach at LSU and Notre Dame
- Zach Triner – NFL long snapper
- Scott Simonson – NFL tight end
- Chris Colabello – MLB first baseman and outfielder
