= 1985–86 NCAA Division III men's ice hockey season =

- Duration: November 1985– March 22, 1986
- NCAA tournament: 1986
- National championship: John S. Glas Field House; Bemidji, Minnesota
- NCAA champion: Bemidji State

The 1985–86 NCAA Division III men's ice hockey season began in November 1985 and concluded on March 22 of the following year. This was the 13th season of Division III college ice hockey.

Though ECAC 2 formally split into two separate conferences in 1985, all games played between ECAC East and ECAC West teams would count for their conference standings. This arrangement remained until 1992.

ECAC 3, in order to prevent confusion with the other two Division III ECAC conferences, was renamed ECAC North/South and divided into two divisions (North and South).

In 1990 the NCAA ruled that Plattsburgh State had violated regulations by allowing some of their players to reside in houses owned by people invested in the ice hockey program and were provided with some benefits including free housing, free meals and cash loans. Because these violations occurred between 1985 and 1988 Plattsburgh State's participation in all NCAA games during that time was vacated.

== Regular season ==
=== Season tournaments ===
Tournament	Dates	Teams	Champion
Potsdam Invitational	November 1–2	4	Merrimack
Westfield State Tournament	November 2–3	4	Saint Michael's
RIT Tournament	November 8–9	4	Wilfrid Laurier
Elmira Classic	November 22–23	4	Elmira
Merrimack Thanksgiving Tournament	November 23–24	4	Merrimack
Cardinal Classic	November 29–30	4	Plattsburgh State
Michigan–Dearborn Tournament	November 29–30	4	
Rensselaer Holiday Tournament	November 29–30	4	Rensselaer
McCabe Tournament	December 6–7	4	Connecticut College
Hamilton Tournament	December 20–21	4	Hamilton
Syracuse Invitational	December 27–28	4	RIT
Codfish Bowl	December 27–28	4	Salem State
Blue–Gold Tournament	January 3–4	4	RIT
Salem State Tournament	January 3–4	4	Salem State
Spurrier Invitational	January 18–19	4	Connecticut College
SUNYAC Tournament	February 22–23	4	Geneseo State

=== Standings ===
1985–86 ECAC East standings
	Conference							Overall					
	GP	W	L	T	Pct.	GF	GA	GP	W	L	T	GF	GA
Bowdoin †*	19	17	2	0	.895			27	22	5	0		
Merrimack	22	16	4	2	.773	131	68	33	19	12	2	180	126
Babson	20	13	6	1	.675	98	56	29	20	8	1	141	85
Salem State	22	14	8	0	.636			27	18	9	0		
Norwich	22	13	8	1	.614	122	82	28	16	11	1	150	108
Connecticut	22	12	10	0	.545	106	102	33	16	17	0	163	180
Colby	22	11	9	2	.545			24	13	9	2		
North Adams State	22	12	10	0	.545			26	15	11	0		
Holy Cross	23	11	12	0	.478	93	96	34	18	16	0	162	146
Middlebury	16	6	9	1	.406	53	81	23	9	13	1	81	114
Saint Anselm	23	9	14	0	.391	73	91	27	12	14	1	90	98
American International	22	7	15	0	.318			31	11	19	1		
Massachusetts–Boston	20	6	14	0	.300			26	10	16	0		
New England College	22	6	15	1	.295			24	8	15	1		
Williams	17	3	13	2	.222			23	3	17	3		
Westfield State	14	0	14	0	.000			22	3	19	0		
Championship: March 8, 1986 † indicates conference regular season champion * indicates conference tournament champion

1985–86 ECAC North/South standings
	Conference							Overall					
	GP	W	L	T	Pct.	GF	GA	GP	W	L	T	GF	GA
North Division
Southeastern Massachusetts †	20	20	0	0	1.000	185	42	24	23	1	0		
Plymouth State	22	17	5	0	.773	132	88	28	19	7	0		
Fitchburg State	20	15	5	0	.750	167	93	26	16	10	0		
Curry	25	18	6	1	.740	152	77	34	24	9	1		
Assumption	18	12	6	0	.667	143	75	23	13	9	1		
Saint Michael's	18	12	6	0	.667	105	73	24	14	9	1	125	100
Hawthorne	24	16	8	0	.667	134	85	27	19	8	0		
Suffolk	19	10	8	1	.553			22	12	9	1		
Framingham State	20	11	9	0	.550			28	13	14	1		
New Hampshire College	25	13	12	0	.520			27	14	13	0		
Bentley	17	8	9	0	.471	83	77	21	8	13	0	92	102
Worcester State	20	8	12	0	.400	121	156	25	9	16	0		
Stonehill	21	7	14	0	.333	95	127	24	8	16	0		
Southern Maine	9	2	7	0	.222	42	55	11	4	7	0	69	62
Keene State	16	3	13	0	.188	67	106	17	4	13	0		
Nichols	21	3	17	1	.167	74	153	25	5	18	2	91	169
South Division
Trinity †~*	16	15	1	0	.938	108	36	27	22	5	0	174	79
Connecticut College	16	15	1	0	.938	100	54	22	16	6	0	111	79
Quinnipiac	24	18	6	0	.750	146	92	27	18	8	1	151	113
Iona	18	13	5	0	.722	115	47	26	17	9	0		
St. John's	15	9	6	0	.600	78	32	18	10	8	0		
Amherst	15	8	7	0	.533	90	79	23	11	12	0		
Wesleyan	17	8	9	0	.471	78	77	23	7	15	1	98	111
Villanova	19	7	12	0	.368	108	152	25	9	16	0		
Lehigh	16	4	12	0	.250	69	122	17	4	13	0	75	132
Roger Williams	21	4	17	0	.190	75	148						
Fairfield	22	4	18	0	.182	103	158	25	5	19	1		
Upsala	20	3	16	1	.175	71	166	25	5	19	1		
Skidmore	20	3	17	0	.150	55	154	21	4	17	0		
Western New England	19	2	17	0	.105	65	176	19	2	17	0		
Scranton	6	0	6	0	.000	22	83	12	0	11	1		
Championship: March 8, 1986 † indicates division regular season champions ~ indicates division tournament champions * indicates conference tournament champion

1985–86 ECAC West standings
	Conference							Overall					
	GP	W	L	T	Pct.	GF	GA	GP	W	L	T	GF	GA
RIT †*	25	22	3	0	.880			37	31	6	0	275	115
Elmira	25	21	4	0	.840			32	25	7	0	183	81
Plattsburgh State	22	16	5	1	.750	171	74	41	27	13	1	286	171
Oswego State	28	18	9	1	.661	144	95	32	19	12	1	171	122
Union	20	13	7	0	.650			29	15	14	0		
Canisius	21	12	8	1	.595			29	18	9	2	160	114
Geneseo State	28	15	12	1	.554			36	20	15	1		
Potsdam State	25	10	14	1	.420			26	11	14	1		
Hamilton	19	5	12	2	.316			24	7	15	2		
Buffalo	23	6	16	1	.283			27	7	19	1		
Hobart	20	5	15	0	.250	78	143	25	6	19	0	95	170
Cortland State	21	3	18	0	.143			25	5	20	0		
Brockport State	20	1	19	0	.050			25	1	24	0	44	214
Championship: March 8, 1986 † indicates conference regular season champion * indicates conference tournament champion

1985–86 NCAA Division III Independent ice hockey standings
	Overall record					
	GP	W	L	T	GF	GA
Lake Forest	24	10	12	2	98	106
St. Bonaventure	26	16	9	1		
Wisconsin–Stevens Point	24	12	12	0		

1985–86 Minnesota Intercollegiate Athletic Conference ice hockey standings
	Conference							Overall					
	GP	W	L	T	Pts	GF	GA	GP	W	L	T	GF	GA
St. Thomas †*	16	15	1	0	30	114	50	32	25	6	1		
Bethel	16	11	5	0	22	82	65	31	15	15	1		
Saint John's	16	8	7	1	17	72	74	26	12	13	1	116	123
Gustavus Adolphus	16	8	8	0	16	89	73	29	12	15	2	127	115
Hamline	16	7	8	1	15	69	70	26	9	15	2	104	120
Augsburg	16	7	9	0	14	67	72	27	10	17	0	109	146
Saint Mary's	16	6	10	0	12	59	82	26	9	17	0	96	126
Concordia (MN)	16	6	10	0	12	71	94	26	8	18	0	109	164
St. Olaf	16	3	13	0	6	58	102	26	6	20	0	97	162
Championship: March 8, 1986 † indicates conference regular season champion * indicates conference tournament champion

1985–86 Northern Collegiate Hockey Association standings
	Conference							Overall					
	GP	W	L	T	Pts	GF	GA	GP	W	L	T	GF	GA
Bemidji State †*	18	12	6	0	24	106	73	35	25	9	1	218	141
Mankato State †	18	11	5	2	24	91	60	38	26	9	3	181	131
St. Scholastica	18	11	6	1	23	78	66	31	18	11	2	151	117
Wisconsin–River Falls	16	11	5	0	22	85	67	30	15	12	3	143	126
St. Cloud State	18	8	9	1	17	83	76	29	16	11	2	159	128
Wisconsin–Superior	16	3	13	0	6	43	80	27	7	20	0	78	136
Wisconsin–Eau Claire	16	2	14	0	4	46	110	26	4	22	0	73	163
Championship: March 9, 1986 † indicates conference regular season champion * indicates conference tournament champion

1985–86 NYCHA standings
	Conference							Overall					
	GP	W	L	T	Pts	GF	GA	GP	W	L	T	GF	GA
RIT †	18	15	3	0	30	166	51	37	31	6	0	275	115
Elmira †	18	15	3	0	30	111	43	31	25	6	0	183	78
Oswego State	18	13	4	1	27	108	54	32	19	12	1	171	122
Geneseo State	18	12	5	1	25	85	72	36	20	15	1		
Canisius	18	11	6	1	23	100	77	29	18	9	2	160	114
Potsdam State	18	7	11	0	14	86	85	26	11	14	1		
Buffalo	18	6	11	1	13	70	93	27	7	19	1		
Hobart	18	5	13	0	10	74	132	25	6	19	0	95	170
Cortland State	18	3	15	0	6	49	133	25	5	20	0		
Brockport State	18	1	17	0	2	36	145	25	1	24	0	44	214
† indicates conference regular season champion

Note: Mini-game are not included in final standings

== 1986 NCAA Tournament ==
Quarterfinals; March 14–16
Mankato State	6	1	2
St. Thomas	5	6	0
Plattsburgh State †	7	5	3
Babson	5	8	1
Bemidji State	4	3	3
Elmira	2	5	0
RIT	4	8	-
Union	1	7	-

Semifinals; March 21
Mankato State	5
Plattsburgh State †	7
Bemidji State	4***
RIT	3

National championship March 22
Plattsburgh State †	5
Bemidji State	8
Third-place game
Mankato State	0
RIT	6

Note: * denotes overtime period(s)
Note: † Plattsburgh State's participation in the tournament was later vacated by the NCAA

== Drafted players ==
Round	Pick	Player	College	Conference	NHL team
3	61	Jim Hrivnak	Merrimack	ECAC East	Washington Capitals
6	122	Tony Schmalzbauer ^{†}	St. Cloud State	NCHA	New York Islanders

† incoming freshman

== 1986 NHL supplemental draft ==
Round	Pick	Player	College	Conference	NHL team
2	9	Art Fitzgerald	Trinity	ECAC North/South	Toronto Maple Leafs

== See also ==
- 1985–86 NCAA Division I men's ice hockey season
