= List of Bentley Falcons men's ice hockey seasons =

This is a season-by-season list of records compiled by Bentley in men's ice hockey.

Bentley began its program in 1977 as a Division III program and promoted the team to Division I in 1999. They played in their first national tournament in 2025.

== Season-by-season results ==
Note: GP = Games played, W = Wins, L = Losses, T = Ties

NCAA D-I Champions	NCAA Frozen Four	Conference Regular Season Champions	Conference Playoff Champions

Season	Conference	Regular Season (Note: Code explanation; GP—Games Played, W—Wins, L—Losses, T—Tied games, OTW—Overtime Wins, OTL—Overtime Loses, 3/SW—Win in 3 on 3 overtime or shootout, Pts—Points*)														Conference Tournament Results	National Tournament Results
Season	Conference	Conference									Overall					Conference Tournament Results	National Tournament Results
Season	Conference	GP	W	L	T	OTW	OTL	3/SW	Pts*	Finish	GP	W	L	T	%	Conference Tournament Results	National Tournament Results
Division III
Joe Quinn (1977–1980)
1977–78	ECAC 3	16	9	7	0	—	—	—	.563	—	19	10	9	0	.526		
1978–79	ECAC 3	14	7	7	0	—	—	—	.500	—	18	7	11	0	.389		
1979–80	ECAC 3	18	15	3	0	—	—	—	.833	—	21	15	6	0	.714	Won Semifinal, 4–1 (Wesleyan); Won Championship, 7–6 (OT) (RIT)	
Tim Flynn (1980–1984)
1980–81	ECAC 3	17	17	0	0	—	—	—	1.000	1st	21	20	1	0	.952	Won Semifinal, 8–4 (Iona); Won Championship, 6–3 (Southern Massachusetts)	
1981–82	ECAC 3	15	12	3	0	—	—	—	.800	3rd	24	14	10	0	.583	Won Semifinal, 5–2 (Assumption); Lost Championship, 1–4 (Massachusetts–Boston)	
1982–83	ECAC 3	14	9	4	1	—	—	—	.679	5th	21	9	10	2	.476		
1983–84	ECAC 3	16	11	5	0	—	—	—	.688	—	24	13	11	0	.542	Won Semifinal, 4–3 (New Hampshire College); Lost Championship, 5–10 (Amherst)	
Mark Canavan (1984–1985)
1984–85	ECAC 3	14	5	9	0	—	—	—	.357	—	20	5	15	0	.250		
Tom Aprille (1988–1994)
1985–86	ECAC North/South	17	8	9	0	—	—	—	.471	—	21	8	13	0	.381		
1986–87	ECAC North/South	20	9	11	0	—	—	—	.450	—	22	9	13	0	.409		
1987–88	ECAC North/South	21	9	12	0	—	—	—	.429	—	22	9	13	0	.409		
1988–89	ECAC North/South	22	8	13	1	—	—	—	.386	—	23	8	14	1	.370		
1989–90	ECAC North/South	24	8	14	2	—	—	—	.375	—	24	8	14	2	.375		
1990–91	ECAC North/South	24	9	14	1	—	—	—	.396	—	25	10	14	1	.420		
1991–92	ECAC North/South	22	7	12	3	—	—	—	.386	—	23	7	13	3	.370		
1992–93	ECAC North/South/Central	14	4	9	1	—	—	—	9	7th	24	10	13	1	.438		
Jim McAdam (1993–2002)
1993–94	ECAC North/South/Central	14	7	6	1	—	—	—	15	4th	24	13	10	1	.563	Lost First Round, 4–10 (Fitchburg State)	
1994–95	ECAC North/South/Central	14	6	4	4	—	—	—	16	4th	26	10	10	6	.500		
1995–96	ECAC North/South/Central	14	9	4	1	—	—	—	19	2nd	27	15	11	1	.574	Won First Round, 10–5 (Roger Williams); Lost Semifinal, 3–7 (Massachusetts–Dartmouth)	
1996–97	ECAC North/South/Central	14	12	2	0	—	—	—	24	1st	28	18	9	1	.661	Lost First Round, 4–5 (OT) (Framingham State)	
1997–98	ECAC North/South/Central	14	10	4	0	—	—	—	20	3rd	26	16	10	0	.615	Lost First Round, 6–9 (Massachusetts–Dartmouth)	
Division II
1998–99	Independent	—	—	—	—	—	—	—	—	—	27	14	12	1	.537		
Division I
1999–00	MAAC	27	7	18	2	—	—	—	16	8th	32	7	23	2	.250	Lost Quarterfinal, 2–9 (Quinnipiac)	
2000–01	MAAC	26	3	21	2	—	—	—	8	11th	29	4	23	2	.172		
2001–02	MAAC	26	4	20	2	—	—	—	10	11th	32	4	26	2	.156		
Ryan Soderquist (2002–2023)
2002–03	MAAC	26	13	13	0	—	—	—	26	T–5th	34	15	19	0	.441	Won Quarterfinal, 2–0 (Sacred Heart); Lost Semifinal, 10–2 (Mercyhurst)	
2003–04	Atlantic Hockey	24	7	13	4	—	—	—	18	7th	32	9	19	4	.344	Lost Quarterfinal, 4–5 (Mercyhurst)	
2004–05	Atlantic Hockey	24	6	13	5	—	—	—	17	7th	34	8	20	6	.324	Won Quarterfinal, 4–2 (Canisius); Lost Semifinal, 1–4 (Quinnipiac)	
2005–06	Atlantic Hockey	28	11	12	5	—	—	—	27	4th	37	15	17	5	.473	Won Quarterfinal, 4–3 (2OT) (Army); Won Semifinal, 3–2 (2OT) (Mercyhurst); Lost Championship, 2–5 (Holy Cross)	
2006–07	Atlantic Hockey	28	11	17	0	—	—	—	22	T–6th	36	12	22	1	.357	Lost Quarterfinal, 2–6 (Army)	
2007–08	Atlantic Hockey	28	9	13	6	—	—	—	24	8th	36	9	21	6	.333	Lost Quarterfinal series, 0–2 (Air Force)	
2008–09	Atlantic Hockey	28	15	11	2	—	—	—	32	4th	38	19	17	2	.526	Won Quarterfinal series, 2–1 (Canisius); Lost Semifinal, 0–3 (Air Force)	
2009–10	Atlantic Hockey	28	10	15	3	—	—	—	23	8th	35	12	19	4	.400	Lost First round, 1–2 (Connecticut)	
2010–11	Atlantic Hockey	27	9	13	5	—	—	—	23	10th	34	10	18	6	.382	Lost First round, 3–6 (Sacred Heart)	
2011–12	Atlantic Hockey	27	13	7	7	—	—	—	33	6th	40	16	16	8	.500	Won First Round series, 2–1 (Sacred Heart); Lost Quarterfinal, series 1–2 (RIT)	
2012–13	Atlantic Hockey	27	10	14	3	—	—	—	23	10th	35	12	20	3	.386	Lost First Round series, 0–2 (Canisius)	
2013–14	Atlantic Hockey	27	16	7	4	—	—	—	36	2nd	37	19	14	4	.568	Lost Quarterfinal series, 1–2 (Canisius)	
2014–15	Atlantic Hockey	28	14	9	5	—	—	—	33	T-3rd	37	17	15	5	.527	Lost Quarterfinal series, 1–2 (Mercyhurst)	
2015–16	Atlantic Hockey	28	9	13	6	—	—	—	24	8th	40	14	20	6	.425	Won First Round series, 2–1 (Sacred Heart); Lost Quarterfinal, series 1–2 (Robert Morris)	
2016–17	Atlantic Hockey	28	10	12	6	—	—	—	26	T–6th	39	13	19	7	.423	Won First Round series, 2–1 (Sacred Heart); Lost Quarterfinal, series 0–2 (Air Force)	
2017–18	Atlantic Hockey	28	9	14	5	—	—	—	23	T–9th	37	13	18	6	.432	Lost First Round series, 1–2 (Robert Morris)	
2018–19	Atlantic Hockey	28	15	9	4	—	—	—	34	2nd	37	17	15	5	.527	Lost Quarterfinal series, 1–2 (Robert Morris)	
2019–20	Atlantic Hockey	28	13	13	2	—	—	0	41	T–6th	36	17	16	3	.514	Won First Round series, 2–0 (Canisius); Tournament Cancelled	
2020–21	Atlantic Hockey	15	4	11	0	1	5	0	.356	8th	16	5	11	0	.313	Won First round, 7–3 (Air Force); Withdrew from tournament	
2021–22	Atlantic Hockey	26	10	14	2	1	2	1	34	T–8th	36	14	20	2	.417	Won First Round series, 2–0 (Niagara); Lost Quarterfinal series, 0–2 (American International)	
2022–23	Atlantic Hockey	26	8	16	2	1	1	1	27	9th	34	11	21	2	.353		
Andy Jones (2023–Present)
2023–24	Atlantic Hockey	26	12	12	2	1	2	2	41	T–6th	35	16	17	2	.486	Lost First Round, 3–4 (OT) (Robert Morris)	
2024–25	AHA	26	16	9	1	1	2	1	51	3rd	40	23	15	2	.600	Won Quarterfinal series, 2–0 (Canisius); Won Semifinal series, 2–0 (Sacred Heart); Won Championship, 6–3 (Holy Cross)	Lost Regional semifinal, 1–3 (Boston College)
Totals											GP	W	L	T	%	Championships	
Regular Season											1341	544	682	115	.449	1 ECAC 3 Championship, 1 ECAC Central Championship, 1 ECAC North/South/Central Championship	
Conference Post-season											75	35	40	0	.467	2 ECAC 3 Tournament Championships, 1 AHA Tournament Championship	
NCAA Post-season											1	0	1	0	.000	1 NCAA Tournament appearance	
Regular Season and Post-season Record											1417	579	723	115	.449		

* Winning percentage is used when conference schedules are unbalanced.
