= 1977–78 NCAA Division II men's ice hockey season =

- Duration: November 1977– March 18, 1978
- NCAA tournament: 1978
- National championship: Springfield, Massachusetts
- NCAA champion: Merrimack

The 1977–78 NCAA Division II men's ice hockey season began in November 1977 and concluded on March 18 of the following year. This was the 14th season of second-tier college ice hockey.

The NCAA instituted a Division II national championship beginning with this season. Bowdoin was one of the two ECAC 2 tournament champions, however, because Bowdoin College barred its teams from participating in national tournaments at the time runner-up Merrimack was selected instead.

Due to the number of independent programs and the lack of any conference tournament for western teams, the NCAA also began holding a playoff series for western teams to help determine which schools would receive bids.

Despite already being part of ECAC 2, all SUNYAC schools, as well as a few other upstate New York schools formed the New York Collegiate Hockey Association (NYCHA). Because all teams were still members of ECAC 2 and the larger conference began holding two tournaments, doubling the number of participants beginning with this season, no NYCHA tournament was ever held.

== Regular season ==
=== Season tournaments ===
Tournament	Dates	Teams	Champion
Merrimack Thanksgiving Tournament	November 25–26	4	Merrimack
Codfish Bowl	December 28–29	4	Salem State
Williams Tournament	December 29–30	4	Oswego State
Salem State Tournament	January 4–5	4	Lowell
Merrimack Christmas Tournament	January 6–7	4	Merrimack

=== Standings ===
1977–78 ECAC 2 standings
	Conference							Overall					
	GP	W	L	T	Pct.	GF	GA	GP	W	L	T	GF	GA
East Region
Bowdoin †*	17	13	3	1	.794	116	61	26	19	6	1		
Merrimack	21	16	4	1	.786	120	71	32	21	9	2	173	114
Lowell	22	16	5	1	.750	120	76	24	17	6	1	130	84
Salem State	24	17	7	0	.708	108	84	29	21	8	0		
Holy Cross	21	14	7	0	.667	99	75	26	16	9	1	132	93
American International	21	13	7	1	.643	113	102	23	15	7	1		
Maine	19	10	9	0	.526	99	64	25	13	12	0	129	99
Saint Anselm	21	10	10	1	.500	113	98	25	12	12	1	130	124
Colby	22	9	12	1	.432	79	77						
Connecticut	18	7	10	1	.417	94	99	23	12	10	1	109	100
Bryant	19	6	12	1	.342	99	129	25	12	13	0		
New Haven	22	7	14	1	.341	79	115	26	10	15	1		
Babson	20	4	15	1	.225	67	100	22	6	15	1		
Boston State	18	4	14	0	.222	74	127	23	7	16	0		
New England College	16	3	12	1	.219	64	99	22	7	13	2		
Bridgewater State	18	3	15	0	.167	61	113	27	7	20	0		
West Region
Plattsburgh State †	19	16	3	0	.842	129	60	22	18	4	0	157	79
Elmira *	22	18	4	0	.818	165	76	32	26	6	0	235	102
Middlebury	14	11	3	0	.786	83	55	22	16	6	0	112	73
Oswego State	24	16	8	0	.667	143	90	27	18	9	0	163	105
Norwich	22	13	9	0	.591	114	95	25	14	11	0	121	106
Hamilton	19	11	8	0	.579	95	81	23	13	10	0		
Army	19	10	8	1	.553	96	90	26	13	12	1	130	129
Buffalo	22	12	10	0	.545	110	93	27	14	13	0		
Geneseo State	23	12	11	0	.522	140	137	26	15	11	0		
Massachusetts	20	8	11	1	.425	75	86	20	8	11	1	75	86
Williams	17	7	10	0	.412	76	85	21	10	11	0		
North Adams State	15	6	9	0	.400	65	63	23	13	10	0		
Potsdam State	15	4	11	0	.267	60	95	21	9	12	0		
Cortland State	18	4	14	0	.222	69	139						
Union	8	1	7	0	.125	22	87	19	4	14	1		
Brockport State	15	1	14	0	.071	42	124	20	3	17	0	65	166
Championships: March 16, 1978 † indicates division regular season champions * indicates conference tournament champions

1977–78 NCAA Division II Independent ice hockey standings
	Overall record					
	GP	W	L	T	GF	GA
Alaska–Fairbanks	18	14	3	1	-	-
Chicago State						
Hillsdale						
Illinois-Chicago	24	14	10	0		
Lake Forest	28	23	5	0	207	98
Mankato State	34	17	16	1	170	154
Oberlin						
St. Cloud State	24	12	12	0	137	126

1977–78 NYCHA standings
	Conference							Overall					
	GP	W	L	T	Pts	GF	GA	GP	W	L	T	GF	GA
Plattsburgh State †	14	13	1	0	26	104	46	22	18	4	0	157	79
Elmira	14	12	2	0	24	109	38	32	26	6	0	235	102
Oswego State	14	9	5	0	18	91	48	27	18	9	0	163	105
Brockport State	14	1	13	0	2	42	124	20	3	17	0	65	166
Buffalo								27	14	13	0		
Cortland State													
Geneseo State								26	15	11	0		
Potsdam State								21	9	12	0		
† indicates conference regular season champion As of 2/20: 1. Plattsburgh 11-1-0-22 91:40, 2. Elmira 10-2-0-20 85:33, 3. Oswego 9-3-0-18 85:38, 4. Buffalo 7-5-0-14 55:54, 5. Cortland 4-7-0-8 55:83, 6. Geneseo 4-7-0-8 44:57, 7. Potsdam 1-10-0-2 38:77, 8. Brockport 1-12-0-2 40:111 Post 2/20 scores: 2/20: Buffalo - Cortland 8:1; 2/22: Elmira - Brockport 18:2; 2/22: Buffalo - Geneseo 7:6 OT; 2/24: Plattsburgh - Cortland 12:2; 2/24: Elmira - Geneseo 6:3; 2/25: Plattsburgh - Oswego 7:5; 2/25: Potsdam - Cortland 5:2; 2/26: Potsdam - Oswego 3:2 OT; 3/3: Potsdam - Geneseo 10:6

1977–78 Minnesota Intercollegiate Athletic Conference ice hockey standings
	Conference							Overall					
	GP	W	L	T	Pts	GF	GA	GP	W	L	T	GF	GA
Augsburg †	14	13	1	0	26			28	22	6	0		
Gustavus Adolphus	14	11	3	0	22			27	17	11	0		
Saint John's	14	9	5	0	18			22	15	7	0		
St. Thomas	14	7	7	0	14			27	14	12	1		
Hamline	14	7	7	0	14			25	11	14	0		
Concordia (MN)	14	6	8	0	12			27	11	16	0		
Saint Mary's	14	2	12	0	4			25	4	21	0		
St. Olaf	14	1	13	0	2			26	3	23	0		
† indicates conference regular season champion

== 1978 NCAA tournament ==
Semifinals; March 16–17
W1	Mankato State	1
E2	Merrimack	6
E1	Elmira	1
W2	Lake Forest	4

National championship March 18
E2	Merrimack	12
W2	Lake Forest	2
Third-place game
W1	Mankato State	5
E1	Elmira	3

Note: * denotes overtime period(s)

== Drafted players ==
Round	Pick	Player	College	Conference	NHL team
9	153	Craig MacTavish	Lowell	ECAC 2	Boston Bruins
18	230	Bob Magnuson	Merrimack	ECAC 2	Montreal Canadiens

† incoming freshman

== See also ==
- 1977–78 NCAA Division I men's ice hockey season
- 1977–78 NCAA Division III men's ice hockey season
