= 1987–88 NCAA Division III men's ice hockey season =

- Duration: October 1987– March 25, 1988
- NCAA tournament: 1988
- National championship: Murray Athletic Center; Elmira, New York
- NCAA champion: Wisconsin–River Falls

The 1987–88 NCAA Division III men's ice hockey season began in October 1987 and concluded on March 25 of the following year. This was the 15th season of Division III college ice hockey.

In 1990 the NCAA ruled that Plattsburgh State had violated regulations by allowing some of their players to reside in houses owned by people invested in the ice hockey program and were provided with some measure of benefits including free housing, free meals and cash loans. Because these violations occurred between 1985 and 1988 Plattsburgh State's participation in all NCAA games during that time was vacated.

Merrimack became the first non-Division I program to receive a bid to the Division I Tournament. As of 2019 no other school outside the top tier has made an appearance in the national championship. The Warriors made the most of their chance, winning two games and reaching the quarterfinals before falling to the eventual national champion Lake Superior State.

== Regular season ==
=== Season tournaments ===
Tournament	Dates	Teams	Champion
Potsdam Invitational	October 30–31	4	Merrimack
Brockport Invitational	November 6–7	4	Brockport State
Cardinal Classic	November 6–7	4	Army
RIT Tournament	November 6–7	4	Michigan–Dearborn
Elmira Tournament		4	Elmira
Merrimack Thanksgiving Tournament	November 21–22	4	Merrimack
McCabe Tournament	December 4–5	4	Connecticut College
Codfish Bowl	December 28–29	4	Massachusetts–Boston
Salem State Tournament	January 3–4	4	Salem State
Lake Forest Tournament	January 15–16	4	Bowdoin
Spurrier Invitational	January 15–16	4	
Roger Williams Tournament	February 19–20	4	Saint Michael's
SUNYAC Tournament	February 20–21	4	Plattsburgh State

=== Standings ===
1987–88 ECAC East standings
	Conference							Overall					
	GP	W	L	T	Pct.	GF	GA	GP	W	L	T	GF	GA
Merrimack †*	22	22	0	0	1.000	187	51	40	34	6	0	261	98
Babson	24	19	5	0	.792	126	74	33	24	9	0	155	101
Bowdoin	21	15	6	0	.714	105	68	27	19	8	0		
Norwich	21	15	6	0	.714	121	80	25	17	8	0	143	98
Salem State	27	18	9	0	.667	147	95	36	22	14	0		
American International	24	16	8	0	.667	146	112	31	21	10	0		
Massachusetts–Boston	19	11	8	0	.579	84	83	25	15	10	0	120	110
Holy Cross	26	12	14	0	.462	122	126	36	18	18	0	169	165
Connecticut	21	9	12	0	.429	113	136	27	12	15	0	142	164
North Adams State	23	9	13	1	.413	89	138	27	13	14	1		
Williams	16	5	11	0	.313	77	82	22	8	14	0		
Colby	21	6	15	0	.286	70	107						
New England College	24	6	18	0	.250	114	175	25	7	18	0		
Middlebury	17	3	13	1	.206	57	90	24	7	16	1	84	116
Saint Anselm	22	2	19	1	.114	54	107	25	3	20	2	60	122
Westfield State	14	0	14	0	.000	39	131	21	1	19	1		
Championship: March 7, 1988 † indicates conference regular season champion * indicates conference tournament champion

1987–88 ECAC North/South standings
	Conference							Overall					
	GP	W	L	T	Pct.	GF	GA	GP	W	L	T	GF	GA
North Division
Curry †	24	23	1	0	.958	158	72	29	26	3	0		
Fitchburg State ~	20	18	1	1	.925	146	59	29	22	6	1		
Southeastern Massachusetts	21	19	2	0	.905	130	61	27	22	5	0		
Tufts	20	14	6	0	.700	113	86	25	18	7	0		
Saint Michael's	19	13	6	0	.684	98	82	21	13	8	0	108	103
Plymouth State	22	13	9	0	.591	114	83	23	13	10	0		
Southern Maine	17	9	8	0	.529	75	76	18	10	8	0	88	78
Hawthorne	22	10	12	0	.455	102	97	24	12	12	0		
New Hampshire College	23	9	13	1	.413	102	119	27	11	14	2		
Assumption	20	8	12	0	.400	104	95	25	8	17	0		
Stonehill	25	10	15	0	.400	98	125	25	10	15	0		
Suffolk	21	7	14	0	.333	94	134	24	9	15	0		
Worcester State	20	6	14	0	.300	96	132	23	7	16	0		
Framingham State	19	5	14	0	.263	75	106	25	5	19	1		
Nichols	23	2	21	0	.087	70	165	24	2	22	0	80	178
South Division
Trinity †~*	18	18	0	0	1.000	126	42	26	22	4	0	158	79
Mercyhurst	2	2	0	0	1.000	23	7	7	4	3	0		
Connecticut College	15	12	2	1	.833	101	42	22	15	5	2	127	67
Iona	20	13	6	1	.675	139	70	26	16	9	1		
Skidmore	20	12	8	0	.600	127	84	25	14	11	0		
Quinnipiac	23	13	9	1	.587	104	75	26	14	11	1	113	89
Roger Williams	18	10	8	0	.556	86	81	19	10	9	0		
Bentley	21	9	12	0	.429	92	90	22	9	13	0	97	98
Wesleyan	19	7	11	1	.395	90	92	22	8	13	1	99	104
St. John's	16	5	10	1	.344	54	94	21	6	14	1		
Amherst	17	5	11	1	.324	57	71	23	5	17	1		
Western New England	16	5	11	0	.313	54	108	19	5	14	0		
Villanova	26	7	18	1	.288	65	103						
Fairfield	26	6	19	1	.250	82	163	26	6	19	1		
Scranton	13	3	10	0	.231	64	103	18	4	14	0		
Upsala	4	0	4	0	.000	3	59	5	0	5	0		
Championship: March 5, 1988 † indicates division regular season champions ~ indicates division tournament champions * indicates conference tournament champion

1987–88 ECAC West standings
	Conference							Overall					
	GP	W	L	T	Pct.	GF	GA	GP	W	L	T	GF	GA
Elmira †*	22	20	2	0	.909	137	50	33	27	6	0	195	95
Plattsburgh State	25	19	6	0	.760			36	24	12	0	239	144
Oswego State	25	18	7	0	.720	190	99	30	20	10	0	210	129
RIT	21	13	7	1	.643	121	86	30	14	15	1	151	144
Brockport State	22	13	8	1	.614	132	117	26	17	8	1	159	125
Union	21	12	7	2	.619	91	88	26	13	11	2		
Canisius	17	10	7	0	.588	107	94	27	15	12	0	183	135
Hamilton	21	12	9	0	.571	169	116	23	13	10	0		
Cortland State	17	6	11	0	.353	75	88	23	12	11	0		
Potsdam State	25	8	16	1	.340	108	164	26	8	17	1		
Geneseo State	24	8	16	0	.333	117	142	28	9	19	0		
Hobart	24	7	17	0	.292	98	109	25	8	17	0	108	114
St. Bonaventure	18	5	13	0	.278	84	136	26	8	17	1		
Binghamton	9	2	7	0	.222	34	80	16	4	12	0		
Fredonia State	18	0	18	0	.000	71	238	22	0	22	0		
Championship: March 5, 1988 † indicates conference regular season champion * indicates conference tournament champion

1987–88 NCAA Division III Independent ice hockey standings
	Overall record					
	GP	W	L	T	GF	GA
Lawrence	8	3	5	0		
Mercyhurst	23	16	7	0	178	86

1987–88 Minnesota Intercollegiate Athletic Conference ice hockey standings
	Conference							Overall					
	GP	W	L	T	Pts	GF	GA	GP	W	L	T	GF	GA
Saint Mary's †	16	13	2	1	27	75	58	30	22	7	1	172	115
St. Thomas *	16	13	3	0	26	93	40	31	21	10	0	150	97
Gustavus Adolphus	16	11	5	0	22	92	71	27	13	14	0	126	145
St. Olaf	16	7	8	1	15	68	74	29	13	15	1	143	124
Concordia (MN)	16	7	8	1	15	67	73	21	9	11	1	88	88
Bethel	16	7	9	0	14	72	73	24	9	15	0	92	125
Saint John's	16	6	10	0	12	68	90	25	12	13	0	122	133
Augsburg	16	4	12	0	8	60	84	27	5	22	0	101	161
Hamline	16	2	13	1	5	50	98	26	6	19	1	98	145
Championship: March 6, 1988 † indicates conference regular season champion * indicates conference tournament champion

1987–88 Northern Collegiate Hockey Association standings
	Conference							Overall					
	GP	W	L	T	Pts	GF	GA	GP	W	L	T	GF	GA
Wisconsin–River Falls †*	24	20	4	0	40	138	82	38	31	6	1	230	125
Bemidji State	24	15	6	3	33	115	79	38	24	11	3	196	123
Wisconsin–Stevens Point	24	15	7	2	32	113	86	29	18	9	2	165	118
Mankato State	24	14	8	2	30	119	82	32	18	11	3	155	112
Wisconsin–Eau Claire	24	8	15	1	17	89	118	30	12	17	1	130	138
Wisconsin–Superior	24	7	17	0	14	85	108	30	11	19	0	133	132
St. Scholastica	24	1	23	0	2	66	169	30	3	27	0	84	202
Championship: March 5, 1988 † indicates conference regular season champion * indicates conference tournament champion

Note: Mini-game are not included in final standings

== 1988 NCAA Tournament ==
Quarterfinals; March 11–13
Elmira	6	10	-
Oswego State	3	2	-
Babson	5	2	1
Plattsburgh State †	2	3	0
Wisconsin–River Falls	6	9	-
Wisconsin–Stevens Point	5	5	-
Bemidji State	5	3	-
St. Thomas	1	1	-

Semifinals; March 18–19
Elmira	3	9	2
Babson	4	1	1
Wisconsin–River Falls	6	5	-
Bemidji State	4	3	-

National Championship; March 25–26
Elmira	1	5	0
Wisconsin–River Falls	7	3	3

Note: * denotes overtime period(s)
Note: † Plattsburgh State's participation in the tournament was later vacated by the NCAA

== Drafted players ==
Round	Pick	Player	College	Conference	NHL team
5	101	Ben Lebeau	Merrimack	ECAC East	Winnipeg Jets
9	176	Matt Hentges ^{†}	Merrimack	ECAC East	Chicago Blackhawks

† incoming freshman

== 1988 NHL supplemental draft ==
Round	Pick	Player	College	Conference	NHL team
2	6	Dave Schofield	Merrimack	ECAC East	Chicago Blackhawks
2	10	Ron Lecinskas	Salem State	ECAC East	New York Rangers
2	12	Sean Fitzgerald	Oswego State	ECAC West	Los Angeles Kings
2	16	Todd Krygier	Connecticut	ECAC East	Hartford Whalers

== See also ==
- 1987–88 NCAA Division I men's ice hockey season
