= John Rolli =

Ice hockey coach

Coaching career (HC unless noted)
- 1984–2016: Mass. Dartmouth

Head coaching record
- Overall: 577–224–43 (.709)

John Rolli is a retired college men's ice hockey coach. Rolli graduated from Salem State College in 1973. He was the head hockey coach at the University of Massachusetts Dartmouth from 1985 until 2016.

== Career ==
Rolli headed the program for 38 years, becoming one of college hockey's most successful coaches. While in the third-tier ECAC conference, Rolli led the Corsairs to numerous conference championships while the league went through several rebrandings. Massachusetts Dartmouth left the conference in 2009 when the school's primary conference, MASCAC, began sponsoring ice hockey. He saw a great deal less success in the new league, posting the only losing records of his career, but he still managed to lead UMD to a pair of titles.

Upon his retirement in 2017, Rolli ranked 14th all-time among college men's ice hockey coaches. He sits 17th all-time as of 2021. Of the coaches who have won at least 400 games, Rolli ranks 3rd all time in winning percentage.

== Head coaching record ==
Record table
Season	Team	Overall	Conference	Standing	Postseason
Southern Massachusetts Corsairs (ECAC 3) (1984–1985)
1984–85	Southern Massachusetts	20–3–0	15–3–0	3rd	ECAC 3 Champion
Southern Massachusetts:		20–3–0	15–3–0		
Southern Massachusetts Corsairs (ECAC North/South) (1985–1991)
1985–86	Southern Massachusetts	23–1–0	20–0–0	1st	ECAC North Division Semifinals
1986–87	Southern Massachusetts	20–4–1	16–2–1	2nd	ECAC North/South Runner-Up
1987–88	Southern Massachusetts	22–5–0	19–2–0	5th	ECAC North Division Semifinals
1988–89	Southern Massachusetts	24–4–0	18–3–0	1st	ECAC North/South Champion
1989–90	Southern Massachusetts	17–8–0	16–4–0	5th	ECAC North Runner-Up
1990–91	Southern Massachusetts	19–6–2	16–2–2	2nd	ECAC North Division Semifinals
Southern Massachusetts:		125–28–3	106–13–3		
Massachusetts–Dartmouth Corsairs (ECAC North/South) (1991–1992)
1991–92	Massachusetts–Dartmouth	17–9–0	14–5–0	3rd	ECAC North Division Semifinals
Massachusetts–Dartmouth:		17–9–0	14–5–0		
Massachusetts–Dartmouth Corsairs (ECAC North) (1992–1998)
1992–93	Massachusetts–Dartmouth	21–3–1	13–1–0	1st	ECAC North/South/Central Champion
1993–94	Massachusetts–Dartmouth	18–5–1	13–1–0	2nd	ECAC North/South/Central Semifinals
1994–95	Massachusetts–Dartmouth	24–3–0	13–1–0	2nd	ECAC North/South/Central Champion
1995–96	Massachusetts–Dartmouth	25–2–0	14–0–0	1st	ECAC North/South/Central Runner-Up
1996–97	Massachusetts–Dartmouth	21–4–2	10–2–2	5th	ECAC North/South/Central Champion
1997–98	Massachusetts–Dartmouth	22–5–0	11–3–0	4th	ECAC North/South/Central Champion
Massachusetts–Dartmouth:		131–22–4	74–8–2		
Massachusetts–Dartmouth Corsairs (ECAC Northeast) (1998–2009)
1998–99	Massachusetts–Dartmouth	20–5–3	14–1–2	T–1st	ECAC Northeast Runner-Up
1999–00	Massachusetts–Dartmouth	15–9–2	8–3–2	4th	ECAC Northeast Semifinals
2000–01	Massachusetts–Dartmouth	15–9–2	10–5–2	5th	ECAC Northeast Quarterfinals
2001–02	Massachusetts–Dartmouth	18–6–1	13–2–0	T–2nd	ECAC Northeast Quarterfinals
2002–03	Massachusetts–Dartmouth	15–7–3	9–6–1	6th	ECAC Northeast Quarterfinals
2003–04	Massachusetts–Dartmouth	18–8–1	11–4–1	5th	ECAC Northeast Semifinals
2004–05	Massachusetts–Dartmouth	22–5–0	14–1–0	2nd	ECAC Northeast Runner-Up
2005–06	Massachusetts–Dartmouth	25–5–0	14–1–0	1st	NCAA Quarterfinals
2006–07	Massachusetts–Dartmouth	25–3–1	14–1–0	1st	NCAA Quarterfinals
2007–08	Massachusetts–Dartmouth	18–9–1	13–3–0	2nd	NCAA First Round
2008–09	Massachusetts–Dartmouth	16–8–2	13–3–1	T–3rd	ECAC Northeast Quarterfinals
Massachusetts–Dartmouth:		207–74–16	133–30–9		
Massachusetts–Dartmouth Corsairs (MASCAC) (2009–2016)
2009–10	Massachusetts–Dartmouth	11–15–1	5–12–1	5th	MASCAC Semifinals
2010–11	Massachusetts–Dartmouth	18–7–1	13–4–1	1st	MASCAC Semifinals
2011–12	Massachusetts–Dartmouth	16–9–2	10–6–2	3rd	MASCAC Semifinals
2012–13	Massachusetts–Dartmouth	12–8–7	9–3–6	2nd	NCAA First Round
2013–14	Massachusetts–Dartmouth	5–18–2	5–13–0	7th	
2014–15	Massachusetts–Dartmouth	8–16–3	6–9–3	6th	MASCAC Semifinals
2015–16	Massachusetts–Dartmouth	7–15–4	6–9–3	4th	MASCAC Quarterfinals
Massachusetts–Dartmouth:		77–88–20	54–56–16		
Total:		577–224–43			
National champion Postseason invitational champion Conference regular season champion Conference regular season and conference tournament champion Division regular season champion Division regular season and conference tournament champion Conference tournament champion

== See also ==
- List of college men's ice hockey coaches with 400 wins
