= New York Collegiate Hockey Association =

- Conference: NCAA
- Founded: 1977
- Folded: 1986
- Sports fielded: Ice hockey; men's: yes; women's: no
- Division: Division II, Division III
- No. of teams: 10 (final season)
- Region: New York

Locations
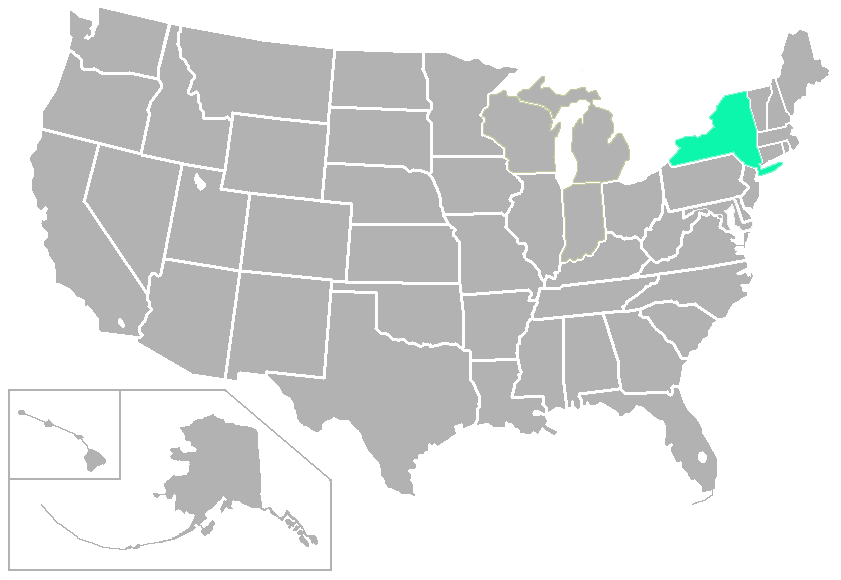

The New York Collegiate Hockey Association was an intercollegiate athletic conference affiliated with the NCAA's Second Division. The league was created in 1977 between 6 then-existing SUNYAC schools as well as Buffalo and Elmira.

== History ==
With the NCAA instituting a Division II Championship beginning with the 1977–78 season 8 upstate New York schools formed the NYCHA to have a better chance at securing one of the bids. So as to not lose those member schools, ECAC 2 began holding two separate conference tournaments the same year, (East and West), allowing those 6 teams to compete with other established division II schools for an NCAA bid. Plattsburgh State left the conference in 1981 and was replaced by RIT. The Conference added Canisius and Hobart over each of the succeeding two seasons but by 1986 the effort to keep the conference as a separate entity stopped and the NYCHA was dissolved.

For the duration of the conference all teams played one another twice during the season in conference games.

== Member schools ==
	Location	Athletic nickname	Enrollment^{#}	Colors	Founded	Joined	Left	Succeeding Conference	Current Conference^{†}
State University of New York at Brockport	Brockport, New York	Golden Eagles	8,275		1867	1977	1986	ECAC West	SUNYAC
University at Buffalo	Buffalo, New York	Bulls	30,648		1846	1977	1986	ECAC West	Dropped Program
Canisius College	Buffalo, New York	Ice Griffs (Note: Canisius changed their nickname to 'Golden Griffins' in 2001.)	3,464		1870	1982	1986	ECAC West	Atlantic Hockey
State University of New York College at Cortland	Cortland, New York	Red Dragons	7,234		1868	1977	1986	ECAC West	SUNYAC
Elmira College	Elmira, New York	Soaring Eagles	1,170		1855	1977	1986	ECAC West	UCHC
State University of New York at Geneseo	Geneseo, New York	Knights	5,585		1871	1977	1986	ECAC West	SUNYAC
Hobart College	Geneva, New York	Statesmen	2,237		1822	1983	1986	ECAC West	NEHC
State University of New York at Oswego	Oswego, New York	Lakers	8,909		1861	1977	1986	ECAC West	SUNYAC
State University of New York at Plattsburgh	Plattsburgh, New York	Cardinals	6,358		1889	1977	1981	ECAC 2	SUNYAC
State University of New York at Potsdam	Potsdam, New York	Bears	4,325		1816	1977	1986	ECAC West	SUNYAC
Rochester Institute of Technology	Henrietta, New York	Tigers	16,842		1829	1981	1986	ECAC West	Atlantic Hockey

# enrollment in 2018
† as of 2018

== See also ==
- ECAC 2
