= Rolli (surname) =

Rolli is a surname. Notable people with the surname include:

- Antonio Rolli (1643–1695), Italian painter
- Giuseppe Rolli (1645–1727), Italian painter and engraver
- John Rolli, American college men's ice hockey coach
- Paolo Rolli (1687–1765), Italian librettist and poet

== See also ==
- Rollin (name)
