= Robert E. Raiche =

American politician (1937–2024)

Member of the New Hampshire House of Representatives
- In office 1965–1970

Member of the New Hampshire House of Representatives from the Hillsborough 34th district
- In office 1970–1972

United States Marshal of New Hampshire
- In office 1977–1980
- President: Jimmy Carter

Personal details
- Born: Robert Edward Raiche; February 18, 1937 Manchester, New Hampshire, U.S.
- Died: June 9, 2024 (aged 87) Manchester, New Hampshire, U.S.
- Party: Democratic
- Spouse: Mary Raiche (died. 2022)
- Relatives: Gary Casinghino (son-in-law)
- Education: Nathaniel Hawthorne College; University of New Hampshire; Franklin Pierce Law Center

Robert Edward Raiche (February 18, 1937 – June 9, 2024) was an American politician. A member of the Democratic Party, he served in the New Hampshire House of Representatives from 1965 to 1972 and as the United States marshal of New Hampshire from 1977 to 1980.

== Life and career ==
Raiche was born in Manchester, New Hampshire, the son of Edward Raiche and Lucienne Harris. He attended Bishop Bradley High School, graduating in 1955. After graduating, he served in the United States Marine Corps during the Korean War, which after his discharge, he attended Nathaniel Hawthorne College, earning his B.A. degree in political science in 1967. He also attended the University of New Hampshire, earning his M.A. degree in 1970.

Raiche served in the New Hampshire House of Representatives from 1965 to 1972. He lost his seat in the House, in 1972, when he ran as a Democratic candidate for governor of New Hampshire. He received 16,216 votes, but lost in the Democratic primary election to candidate Roger J. Crowley, who won with 29,326 votes.

In 1977, Raiche served as the United States marshal of New Hampshire, serving until 1980, when he earned his J.D. degree from Franklin Pierce Law Center.

== Death ==
Raiche died on June 9, 2024, in Manchester, New Hampshire, at the age of 87.
