= Flint Estate =

Historic house in New Hampshire, United States

- The Flint Estate
- U.S. National Register of Historic Places
- U.S. Historic district
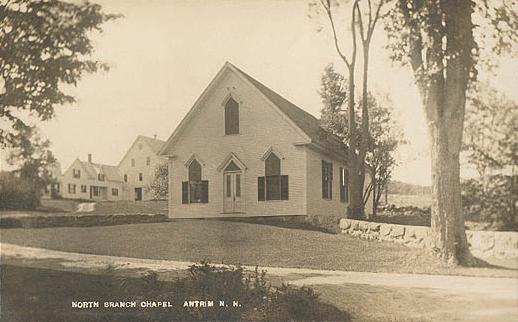
- North Branch Chapel, c. 1915

- Location within New Hampshire Location within the United States
- Location: Old Keene and Old Center Rd., Antrim, New Hampshire
- Coordinates: 43°5′4″N 71°58′40″W
- Area: 3.1 acres (1.3 ha)
- Architectural style: Colonial Revival
- NRHP reference No.: 84000525
- Added to NRHP: December 13, 1984

The Flint Estate is a historic summer estate in Antrim, New Hampshire. The estate consists of a collection of five buildings, some of early-to-mid 19th century origin, either brought together or built by Wyman Kneeland Flint beginning in 1913. They represent the surviving elements of the village of North Antrim, much of which was destroyed by fire in 1888. Most of the estate is now owned by Hawthorne Academy (Overseas United Education Foundation).

== Description and history ==
The Flint Estate is located in northern Antrim, on the north side of the North Branch River east of Stacy Hill Road. It includes his mansion, a c. 1817 brick structure that he had significantly enlarged in 1913–14. It also includes the c. 1820 North Branch Schoolhouse, acquired by Flint as a philanthropic gesture to help fund the construction of a new school, and since converted into a residence. The North Branch Chapel is a c. 1877 wooden structure, and the Sawyer House is a c. 1846 vernacular Greek Revival house. Flint used his property as a summer estate and a gentleman's farm. It later served as the campus of Nathaniel Hawthorne College, whose modern buildings were generally located west of the original buildings of the estate.

When the area that is now Antrim was first settled in the 18th century, it had no clear village centers. The village of North Antrim arose around a small mill complex on the North Branch River, where a waterfall provided power for saw- and gristmills built in the 1770s. It was also located near the northern end of the main north–south road through the township. The Keene Road (whose modern alignment is New Hampshire Route 31) was built east–west through the village in 1834, originally running along the northern bank of the North Branch. The original Flint house was at the time of its original construction one of the largest and finest in the village. The bulk of the village, located on the south bank of the river, was destroyed in a major fire in 1888.

== See also ==
- National Register of Historic Places listings in Hillsborough County, New Hampshire
