= Gary Casinghino =

American politician

Member of the New Hampshire House of Representatives from the Hillsborough 29th district
- In office 1980–1982

Personal details
- Party: Democratic
- Relatives: Robert E. Raiche (father-in-law)

Gary Casinghino is an American politician. A member of the Democratic Party, he served in the New Hampshire House of Representatives from 1980 to 1982.
