= ECAC Northeast tournament =

- Conference hockey championship
- Sport: Ice hockey
- Conference: ECAC Northeast
- Format: Single-elimination
- Played: 1972–2016

== History ==
The ECAC Northeast tournament began in 1972, after several teams formed the first third-tier ice hockey conference. For the first three years the championship was only a single game between the teams judged to be the top two in the conference. Because all games between ECAC teams regardless of division were counted the teams with the two best records weren't necessarily invited to play. In 1975 the tournament was expanded to 4 teams with one of the four chosen as the host. Host teams were dropped after 1977 with the higher-seeded teams playing at home afterwards. With the conference ballooning to more than two dozen teams, the conference tournament was expanded to 8 for 1984. Two years later the conference split into North and South divisions with each holding an individual 6-team postseason tournament and the two champions meeting to decide the conference champion. When the conference divided itself into three divisions for the 1992–93 season, the divisional tournament was scrapped and replaced with a single 8-team series. The top teams from each division were seeded 1–3 according to their overall conference records while the five teams with the best remaining conference records were seeded 4–8. In 1998 the conference abandoned divisional alignments but did not change the form of the conference tournament. A year later the four Division II programs in the conference played in a separate Division II tournament, allowing the remaining 14 teams to vie for the official ECAC Northeast championship with the champion receiving an automatic bid to the National Tournament.

== 1972 ==
Seed	School	Conference Record
1	Worcester State	13–3–0
2	Nichols	4–9–0

Championship; March 8
1	Worcester State	8
2	Nichols	5

Note: * denotes overtime period(s)

== 1973 ==
Seed	School	Conference Record
1	Worcester State	12–1–0
2	North Adams State	2–5–0

Championship
1	Worcester State	10
2	North Adams State	3

Note: * denotes overtime period(s)

== 1974 ==
Seed	School	Conference Record
1	Worcester State	8–0–1
2	Wesleyan	5–2–0

Championship; March 2
1	Worcester State	11
2	Wesleyan	5

Note: * denotes overtime period(s)

== 1975 ==
Seed	School	Conference Record
1	Bryant	10–2–0
2	North Adams State	11–2–0
3	Worcester State	8–3–0
4	Wesleyan	5–4–0

Note: team in italics served as host.

Semifinals; February 28
1	Bryant	4
4	Wesleyan	1
2	North Adams State	5
3	Worcester State	3

Championship
1	Bryant	6
2	North Adams State	4

Note: * denotes overtime period(s)

== 1976 ==
Seed	School	Conference Record
1	Amherst	6–0–1
2	Worcester State	8–1–0
3	RIT	5–1–0
4	Framingham State	9–3–0

Note: team in italics served as host.

Semifinals
1	Amherst	7
4	Framingham State	4
2	Worcester State	11
3	RIT	0

Championship
1	Amherst	3*
2	Worcester State	2

Note: * denotes overtime period(s)

== 1977 ==
Seed	School	Conference Record
1	Worcester State	11–1–0
2	Westfield State	12–4–0
3	Framingham State	9–4–0
4	Trinity	10–4–0

Note: team in italics served as host.

Semifinals
1	Worcester State	7
4	Trinity	5
2	Westfield State	4
3	Framingham State	6

Championship
1	Worcester State	7*
3	Framingham State	6

Note: * denotes overtime period(s)

== 1978 ==
Seed	School	Conference Record
1	Westfield State	13–0–0
2	Framingham State	13–1–0
3	Trinity	10–5–0
4	Iona	10–3–2

Semifinals
1	Westfield State	17
4	Iona	2
2	Framingham State	4
3	Trinity	6

Championship
1	Westfield State	4
3	Trinity	3

Note: * denotes overtime period(s)

== 1979 ==
Seed	School	Conference Record
1	Framingham State	12–1–0
2	Trinity	14–3–0
3	RIT	7–1–0
4	Wesleyan	9–4–0

Semifinals
1	Framingham State	5
4	Wesleyan	0
2	Trinity	9
3	RIT	6

Championship
1	Framingham State	6
2	Trinity	5

Note: * denotes overtime period(s)

== 1980 ==
Seed	School	Conference Record
1	Amherst	11–1–0
2	Wesleyan	9–4–0
3	Bentley	13–3–0
4	RIT	6–2–0

Semifinals; February 29
1	Amherst	4
4	RIT	8
2	Wesleyan	1
3	Bentley	4

Championship
4	RIT	6
3	Bentley	7*

Note: * denotes overtime period(s)

== 1981 ==
Seed	School	Conference Record
1	Bentley	17–0–0
2	Southeastern Massachusetts	13–2–0
3	Wesleyan	12–3–0
4	Iona	12–2–1

Semifinals; February 27
1	Bentley	8
4	Iona	4
2	Southeastern Massachusetts	5
3	Wesleyan	3

Championship
1	Bentley	6
2	Southeastern Massachusetts	2

Note: * denotes overtime period(s)

== 1982 ==
Seed	School	Conference Record
1	Massachusetts–Boston	16–1–0
2	Assumption	14–2–0
3	Bentley	11–3–0
4	Amherst	10–3–1

Semifinals; March 5
1	Massachusetts–Boston	7
4	Amherst	3
2	Assumption	2
3	Bentley	5

Championship; March 6
1	Massachusetts–Boston	9
3	Bentley	3

Note: * denotes overtime period(s)

== 1983 ==
Seed	School	Conference Record
1	Iona	14–1–0
2	Wesleyan	12–3–1
3	Southeastern Massachusetts	11–4–0
4	Fitchburg State	15–4–0

Semifinals; March 4
1	Iona	2
4	Fitchburg State	0
2	Wesleyan	4
3	Southeastern Massachusetts	7

Championship; March 5
1	Iona	2
3	Southeastern Massachusetts	8

Note: * denotes overtime period(s)

== 1984 ==
Seed	School	Conference Record	Seed	School	Conference Record
1	Amherst	13–1–0	5	Bentley	11–5–0
2	Assumption	12–4–0	6	Trinity	9–6–1
3	Southeastern Massachusetts	13–3–1	7	Iona	15–2–2
4	New Hampshire College	18–4–1	5	Wesleyan	12–7–0

Quarterfinals; March 3
1	Amherst	8
8	Wesleyan	1
2	Assumption	4
7	Iona	3
3	Southeastern Massachusetts	11
6	Trinity	2
4	New Hampshire College	3
5	Bentley	4

Semifinals
1	Amherst	10
5	Bentley	5
2	Assumption	4
3	Southeastern Massachusetts	8

Championship
1	Amherst	3
3	Southeastern Massachusetts	4*

Note: * denotes overtime period(s)

== 1985 ==
Seed	School	Conference Record	Seed	School	Conference Record
1	Trinity	14–2–0	5	Assumption	13–3–0
2	Iona	18–3–0	6	Fitchburg State	16–4–0
3	Southeastern Massachusetts	15–3–0	7	Curry	16–4–1
4	Amherst	12–3–1	8	Framingham State	12–5–1

Quarterfinals
1	Trinity	7
8	Framingham State	5
2	Iona	4
7	Curry	1
3	Southeastern Massachusetts	4
6	Fitchburg State	1
4	Amherst	6*
5	Assumption	5

Semifinals
1	Trinity	7
4	Amherst	4
2	Iona	4
3	Southeastern Massachusetts	5

Championship
1	Trinity	2
3	Southeastern Massachusetts	3

Note: * denotes overtime period(s)

== 1986 ==
=== North ===
Seed	School	Conference Record	Seed	School	Conference Record
1	Southeastern Massachusetts	20–0–0	4	Curry	18–6–1
2	Fitchburg State	15–5–0	5	Assumption	12–6–0
3	Plymouth State	17–5–0	6	Saint Michael's	12–6–1

=== South ===
Seed	School	Conference Record	Seed	School	Conference Record
1	Trinity	15–1–0	4	Quinnipiac	18–6–0
2	Connecticut College	15–1–0	5	St. John's	9–6–0
3	Iona	13–5–0	6	Amherst	8–7–0

Divisional Quarterfinals; February 26
N3	Plymouth State	4
N6	Saint Michael's	2
N4	Curry	3
N5	Assumption	2
S3	Iona	8
S6	Amherst	4
S4	Quinnipiac	1
S5	St. John's	6

Divisional Semifinals; March 2
N1	Southeastern Massachusetts	4
N4	Curry	5
North
N2	Fitchburg State	6
N3	Plymouth State	7
S1	Trinity	7
S5	St. John's	1
South
S2	Connecticut College	3
S3	Iona	2

Divisional Championships; March 5
N4	Curry	5
N3	Plymouth State	2
S1	Trinity	9
S2	Connecticut College	4

Conference Championship; March 8
N4	Curry	1
S1	Trinity	5

Note: * denotes overtime period(s)

== 1987 ==
=== North ===
Seed	School	Conference Record	Seed	School	Conference Record
1	Southeastern Massachusetts	16–2–1	4	New Hampshire College	13–8–2
2	Fitchburg State	15–4–0	5	Curry	21–7–0
3	Framingham State	18–4–0	6	Hawthorne	11–9–0

=== South ===
Seed	School	Conference Record	Seed	School	Conference Record
1	Trinity	17–0–0	4	Wesleyan	12–5–1
2	Quinnipiac	19–4–1	5	Iona	13–6–0
3	Connecticut College	13–3–0	6	Roger Williams	8–7–1

Divisional Quarterfinals; February 25
N3	Fitchburg State	7
N6	Hawthorne	3
N4	New Hampshire College	1
N5	Curry	2
S3	Connecticut College	10
S6	Roger Williams	2
S4	Wesleyan	8
S5	Iona	5

Divisional Semifinals; March 1
N1	Southeastern Massachusetts	6
N5	Curry	4
North
N3	Fitchburg State	4
N2	Framingham State	3
S1	Trinity	11
S4	Wesleyan	1
South
S2	Quinnipiac	6
S3	Connecticut College	1

Divisional Championships; March 4
N1	Southeastern Massachusetts	8
N2	Fitchburg State	3
S1	Trinity	7
S2	Quinnipiac	5

Conference Championship; March 7
N1	Southeastern Massachusetts	3
S1	Trinity	5

Note: * denotes overtime period(s)

== 1988 ==
=== North ===
Seed	School	Conference Record	Seed	School	Conference Record
1	Curry	23–1–0	4	Tufts	14–6–0
2	Fitchburg State	18–1–1	5	Saint Michael's	13–6–0
3	Southeastern Massachusetts	19–2–0	6	Plymouth State	13–9–0

=== South ===
Seed	School	Conference Record	Seed	School	Conference Record
1	Trinity	18–0–0	4	Iona	13–6–1
2	Connecticut College	12–2–1	5	Roger Williams	10–8–0
3	Quinnipiac	13–9–1	6	Skidmore	12–8–0

Divisional Quarterfinals; February 24
N3	Southeastern Massachusetts	5
N6	Plymouth State	2
N4	Tufts	9
N5	Saint Michael's	5
S3	Quinnipiac	6
S6	Skidmore	1
S4	Iona	5
S5	Roger Williams	3

Divisional Semifinals; February 27
N1	Curry	2
N4	Tufts	7
North
N2	Fitchburg State	4
N3	Southeastern Massachusetts	3
S1	Trinity	8
S4	Iona	3
South
S2	Connecticut College	5
S3	Quinnipiac	1

Divisional Championships; March 2
N4	Tufts	2
N2	Fitchburg State	8
S1	Trinity	7
S2	Connecticut College	5

Conference Championship; March 5
N2	Fitchburg State	1
S1	Trinity	2

Note: * denotes overtime period(s)

== 1989 ==
=== North ===
Seed	School	Conference Record	Seed	School	Conference Record
1	Southern Massachusetts	18–3–0	4	Tufts	13–5–1
2	Curry	15–3–1	5	Fitchburg State	14–6–0
3	Saint Michael's	15–3–1	6	Suffolk	14–6–1

=== South ===
Seed	School	Conference Record	Seed	School	Conference Record
1	Iona	15–4–0	4	Amherst	10–6–0
2	Connecticut College	13–4–0	5	Western New England	10–4–1
3	Trinity	12–5–0	6	Wesleyan	12–7–0

Divisional Quarterfinals; March 1
N3	Saint Michael's	5
N6	Suffolk	4
N4	Tufts	2
N5	Fitchburg State	3
S3	Trinity	11
S6	Wesleyan	1
S4	Amherst	4
S5	Western New England	1

Divisional Semifinals; March 4
N1	Southeastern Massachusetts	4
N5	Fitchburg State	3
North
N2	Curry	9
N3	Saint Michael's	0
S1	Iona	3
S4	Amherst	0
South
S2	Connecticut College	1
S3	Trinity	3

Divisional Championships; March 8
N1	Southeastern Massachusetts	10
N2	Curry	4
S1	Iona	5
S3	Trinity	3

Conference Championship; March 11
N1	Southeastern Massachusetts	4
S1	Iona	2

Note: * denotes overtime period(s)

== 1990 ==
=== North ===
Seed	School	Conference Record	Seed	School	Conference Record
1	Fitchburg State	17–4–0	4	Southern Maine	11–6–2
2	Southern Massachusetts	16–4–0	5	New Hampshire College	11–7–2
3	Assumption	14–8–1	6	Curry	10–6–2

=== South ===
Seed	School	Conference Record	Seed	School	Conference Record
1	Trinity	16–3–0	4	Western New England	13–7–1
2	Connecticut College	14–3–0	5	Amherst	11–7–0
3	Iona	14–2–0	6	Roger Williams	12–12–1

Divisional Quarterfinals; February 28
N3	Assumption	8**
N6	Curry	7
N4	Southern Maine	2
N5	New Hampshire College	4
S3	Iona	5
S6	Roger Williams	2
S4	Western New England	4
S5	Amherst	3

Divisional Semifinals; March 3
N1	Fitchburg State	10
N5	New Hampshire College	4
North
N2	Southeastern Massachusetts	9
N3	Assumption	4
S1	Trinity	5
S4	Western New England	1
South
S2	Connecticut College	5
S3	Iona	4

Divisional Championships; March 7
N1	Fitchburg State	3
N2	Southeastern Massachusetts	1
S1	Trinity	3
S2	Connecticut College	4

Conference Championship; March 10
N1	Fitchburg State	6
S2	Connecticut College	5

Note: * denotes overtime period(s)

== 1991 ==
=== North ===
Seed	School	Conference Record	Seed	School	Conference Record
1	Fitchburg State	17–0–0	4	Plymouth State	11–6–1
2	Suffolk	20–4–0	5	Assumption	11–7–3
3	Southern Massachusetts	16–2–2	6	Tufts	11–7–2

=== South ===
Seed	School	Conference Record	Seed	School	Conference Record
1	Trinity	13–3–1	4	Amherst	11–7–0
2	Iona	14–2–2	5	Western New England	11–9–2
3	Skidmore	13–7–2	6	Roger Williams	13–10–1

Divisional Quarterfinals; February 27
N3	Southeastern Massachusetts	6
N6	Tufts	3
N4	Plymouth State	5
N5	Assumption	4
S3	Skidmore	3
S6	Roger Williams	8
S4	Amherst	5
S5	Western New England	2

Divisional Semifinals; March 2
N1	Fitchburg State	5
N4	Plymouth State	3
North
N2	Suffolk	6
N3	Southeastern Massachusetts	5
S1	Trinity	2
S6	Roger Williams	1
South
S2	Iona	6
S4	Amherst	8

Divisional Championships; March 6
N1	Fitchburg State	10
N2	Suffolk	8
S5	Amherst	3
S2	Trinity	4

Conference Championship; March 9
N1	Fitchburg State	3
S2	Trinity	4*

Note: * denotes overtime period(s)

== 1992 ==
=== North ===
Seed	School	Conference Record	Seed	School	Conference Record
1	Assumption	18–2–0	4	Massachusetts–Dartmouth	14–5–0
2	Fitchburg State	14–2–1	5	Suffolk	14–8–1
3	Southern Maine	12–8–1	6	Framingham State	15–7–0

=== South ===
Seed	School	Conference Record	Seed	School	Conference Record
1	Amherst	10–4–1	4	Iona	9–9–0
2	Western New England	13–7–0	5	Wesleyan	10–9–1
3	Fairfield	14–9–0	6	Skidmore	8–9–0

Divisional Quarterfinals; March 4
N3	Southern Maine	3
N6	Framingham State	1
N4	Massachusetts–Dartmouth	5
N5	Suffolk	2
S3	Fairfield	5*
S6	Skidmore	4
S4	Iona	7
S5	Wesleyan	5

Divisional Semifinals; March 7
N1	Assumption	4
N4	Massachusetts–Dartmouth	1
North
N2	Fitchburg State	4
N3	Southern Maine	3
S1	Amherst	6
S4	Iona	1
South
S2	Western New England	5
S3	Fairfield	2

Divisional Championships; March 11
N1	Assumption	4
N2	Fitchburg State	7
S1	Amherst	5*
S2	Western New England	4

Conference Championship; March 14
N2	Fitchburg State	2
S1	Amherst	3

Note: * denotes overtime period(s)

== 1993 ==
Seed	School	Conference Record	Seed	School	Conference Record
1	Massachusetts–Dartmouth		5	Assumption	
2	Southern Maine	16–4–1	6	Fitchburg State	11–5–2
3	Iona		7	Suffolk	
4	Plymouth State		8	Skidmore	

Note: teams in italics were division champions.

Quarterfinals; March 3
1	Massachusetts–Dartmouth	10
8	Skidmore	0
4	Plymouth State	2
5	Assumption	4
2	Southern Maine	4
7	Suffolk	3
3	Iona	5
6	Fitchburg State	3

Semifinals; March 6
1	Massachusetts–Dartmouth	6
5	Assumption	2
2	Southern Maine	4
3	Iona	3

Championship; March 10
1	Massachusetts–Dartmouth	3
2	Southern Maine	0

Note: * denotes overtime period(s)

== 1994 ==
Seed	School	Conference Record	Seed	School	Conference Record
1	Massachusetts–Dartmouth		5	Assumption	
2	Fitchburg State		6	Plymouth State	
3	Skidmore		7	Bentley	
4	Western New England		8	Framingham State	

Note: teams in italics were division champions.

Quarterfinals; March 2
1	Massachusetts–Dartmouth	6
8	Framingham State	2
4	Western New England	1
5	Assumption	6
2	Fitchburg State	10
7	Bentley	4
3	Skidmore	3
6	Plymouth State	5

Semifinals; March 5
1	Massachusetts–Dartmouth	2
5	Assumption	6
2	Fitchburg State	6
6	Plymouth State	0

Championship; March 9
5	Assumption	4
2	Fitchburg State	6

Note: * denotes overtime period(s)

== 1995 ==
Seed	School	Conference Record	Seed	School	Conference Record
1	Massachusetts–Dartmouth		5	Fairfield	
2	Fitchburg State		6	Tufts	
3	Skidmore		7	Assumption	
4	Framingham State		8	Nichols	

Note: teams in italics were division champions.

Quarterfinals; March 1
1	Massachusetts–Dartmouth	11
8	Nichols	3
4	Framingham State	2**
5	Fairfield	1
2	Fitchburg State	6
7	Assumption	4
3	Skidmore	6
6	Tufts	4

Semifinals; March 4
1	Massachusetts–Dartmouth	4
4	Framingham State	3
2	Fitchburg State	7
3	Skidmore	4

Championship; March 8
1	Massachusetts–Dartmouth	5
2	Fitchburg State	1

Note: * denotes overtime period(s)

== 1996 ==
Seed	School	Conference Record	Seed	School	Conference Record
1	Massachusetts–Dartmouth		5	Bentley	14–7–1
2	Fitchburg State		6	Tufts	
3	Skidmore		7	Saint Michael's	12–8–1
4	Roger Williams		8	Framingham State	

Note: teams in italics were division champions.

Quarterfinals; February 28
1	Massachusetts–Dartmouth	8
8	Framingham State	1
4	Roger Williams	5
5	Bentley	10
2	Fitchburg State	6
7	Saint Michael's	3
3	Skidmore	7
6	Tufts	4

Semifinals; March 2
1	Massachusetts–Dartmouth	7
5	Bentley	3
2	Fitchburg State	6
3	Skidmore	2

Championship; March 6
1	Massachusetts–Dartmouth	1
2	Fitchburg State	2*

Note: * denotes overtime period(s)

== 1997 ==
Seed	School	Conference Record	Seed	School	Conference Record
1	Bentley	17–5–1	5	Massachusetts–Dartmouth	
2	Fitchburg State		6	Assumption	
3	Skidmore		7	Worcester State	
4	Saint Michael's	17–3–1	8	Framingham State	

Note: teams in italics were division champions.

Quarterfinals; March 5
1	Bentley	4
8	Framingham State	5*
2	Fitchburg State	6*
7	Worcester State	5
3	Skidmore	8
6	Assumption	3
4	Saint Michael's	2
5	Massachusetts–Dartmouth	3

Semifinals; March 8
2	Fitchburg State	5
8	Framingham State	2
3	Skidmore	2
5	Massachusetts–Dartmouth	3

Championship; March 12
2	Fitchburg State	3
5	Massachusetts–Dartmouth	6

Note: * denotes overtime period(s)

== 1998 ==
Seed	School	Conference Record	Seed	School	Conference Record
1	Fitchburg State		5	Bentley	12–4–0
2	Saint Michael's	17–3–0	6	New Hampshire College	
3	Wentworth	14–5–0	7	Worcester State	
4	Massachusetts–Dartmouth		8	Plymouth State	

Note: teams in italics were division champions.

Quarterfinals; March 4
1	Fitchburg State	11
8	Plymouth State	2
2	Saint Michael's	5
7	Worcester State	2
3	Wentworth	4
6	New Hampshire College	2
4	Massachusetts–Dartmouth	9
5	Bentley	6

Semifinals; March 7
1	Fitchburg State	4
4	Massachusetts–Dartmouth	5*
2	Saint Michael's	7
3	Wentworth	1

Championship; March 11
4	Massachusetts–Dartmouth	4
2	Saint Michael's	2

Note: * denotes overtime period(s)

== 1999 ==
Seed	School	Conference Record	Seed	School	Conference Record
1	Massachusetts–Dartmouth	14–1–2	5	Tufts	12–4–1
2	Fitchburg State	14–1–2	6	New Hampshire College	11–5–1
3	Wentworth	13–3–1	7	Plymouth State	10–7–0
4	Saint Michael's	12–4–1	8	Johnson & Wales	9–8–0

Quarterfinals; March 3
1	Massachusetts–Dartmouth	5
8	Johnson & Wales	3
2	Fitchburg State	6
7	Plymouth State	2
3	Wentworth	2
6	New Hampshire College	3
4	Saint Michael's	3
5	Tufts	2

Semifinals; March 6
1	Massachusetts–Dartmouth	4
6	New Hampshire College	0
2	Fitchburg State	6
4	Saint Michael's	4

Championship; March 10
1	Massachusetts–Dartmouth	2
2	Fitchburg State	3*

Note: * denotes overtime period(s)

== 2000 ==
Seed	School	Conference Record	Seed	School	Conference Record
1	Wentworth	11–1–1	5	Lebanon Valley	8–4–1
2	Fitchburg State	10–1–2	6	Johnson & Wales	7–6–0
3	Tufts	9–3–1	7	Western New England	7–6–0
4	Massachusetts–Dartmouth	8–3–2	8	Salve Regina	6–6–1

Quarterfinals; February 26
1	Wentworth	8
8	Salve Regina	2
2	Fitchburg State	5*
7	Western New England	4
3	Tufts	7
6	Johnson & Wales	4
4	Massachusetts–Dartmouth	5
5	Lebanon Valley	4

Semifinals; March 1
1	Wentworth	9
4	Massachusetts–Dartmouth	1
2	Fitchburg State	4*
3	Tufts	3

Championship; March 4
1	Wentworth	5
2	Fitchburg State	1

Note: * denotes overtime period(s)

== 2001 ==
Seed	School	Conference Record	Seed	School	Conference Record
1	Tufts	15–1–1	5	Massachusetts–Dartmouth	10–5–2
2	Wentworth	14–2–1	6	Worcester State	9–7–1
3	Johnson & Wales	14–2–1	7	Fitchburg State	9–7–1
4	Lebanon Valley	12–4–1	8	Salve Regina	7–10–0

Quarterfinals; February 24–25
1	Tufts	5
8	Salve Regina	6*
2	Wentworth	7
7	Fitchburg State	2
3	Johnson & Wales	8
6	Worcester State	3
4	Lebanon Valley	3
5	Massachusetts–Dartmouth	1

Semifinals; February 28
2	Wentworth	7
8	Salve Regina	0
3	Johnson & Wales	5
4	Lebanon Valley	8

Championship; March 3
2	Wentworth	3
4	Lebanon Valley	4

Note: * denotes overtime period(s)

== 2002 ==
Seed	School	Conference Record	Seed	School	Conference Record
1	Lebanon Valley	13–1–1	5	Johnson & Wales	11–4–0
2	Massachusetts–Dartmouth	13–2–0	6	Fitchburg State	9–6–0
3	Wentworth	13–2–0	7	Salve Regina	8–7–0
4	Curry	11–4–0	8	Plymouth State	7–8–0

Quarterfinals; February 23–24
1	Lebanon Valley	6
8	Plymouth State	1
2	Massachusetts–Dartmouth	3
7	Salve Regina	4
3	Wentworth	2
6	Fitchburg State	1
4	Curry	5
5	Johnson & Wales	6

Semifinals; February 27
1	Lebanon Valley	4
7	Salve Regina	0
3	Wentworth	5*
5	Johnson & Wales	4

Championship; March 3
1	Lebanon Valley	4
3	Wentworth	5

Note: * denotes overtime period(s)

== 2003 ==
Seed	School	Conference Record	Seed	School	Conference Record
1	Wentworth	13–1–2	5	Johnson & Wales	11–4–1
2	Lebanon Valley	14–2–0	6	Massachusetts–Dartmouth	9–6–1
3	Curry	13–3–0	7	Salve Regina	8–7–1
4	Fitchburg State	12–3–1	8	Worcester State	7–7–2

Quarterfinals; March 1–2
1	Wentworth	1
8	Worcester State	0
2	Lebanon Valley	9
7	Salve Regina	0
3	Curry	9
6	Massachusetts–Dartmouth	1
4	Fitchburg State	4
5	Johnson & Wales	3

Semifinals; March 5
1	Wentworth	5
4	Fitchburg State	1
2	Lebanon Valley	6
3	Curry	2

Championship; March 8
1	Wentworth	5
2	Lebanon Valley	1

Note: * denotes overtime period(s)

== 2004 ==
Seed	School	Conference Record	Seed	School	Conference Record
1	Curry	16–0–0	5	Massachusetts–Dartmouth	11–4–1
2	Lebanon Valley	14–2–0	6	Fitchburg State	7–6–3
3	Wentworth	12–2–2	7	Suffolk	6–8–2
4	Framingham State	11–3–2	8	Salve Regina	6–7–2

Quarterfinals; February 28–29
1	Curry	10
8	Salve Regina	0
2	Lebanon Valley	4
7	Suffolk	2
3	Wentworth	8
6	Fitchburg State	2
4	Framingham State	1
5	Massachusetts–Dartmouth	5

Semifinals; March 6
1	Curry	8
5	Massachusetts–Dartmouth	3
2	Lebanon Valley	4
3	Wentworth	6

Championship; March 7
1	Curry	4
3	Wentworth	5

Note: * denotes overtime period(s)

== 2005 ==
Seed	School	Conference Record	Seed	School	Conference Record
1	Curry	14–0–1	5	Fitchburg State	8–6–1
2	Massachusetts–Dartmouth	14–1–0	6	Johnson & Wales	8–7–0
3	Wentworth	11–2–2	7	Salve Regina	7–7–1
4	Plymouth State	9–5–1	8	Framingham State	5–10–0

Quarterfinals; February 26
1	Curry	3
8	Framingham State	2
2	Massachusetts–Dartmouth	4
7	Salve Regina	1
3	Wentworth	6
6	Johnson & Wales	2
4	Plymouth State	6
5	Fitchburg State	1

Semifinals; March 2
1	Curry	8
4	Plymouth State	2
2	Massachusetts–Dartmouth	3
3	Wentworth	2

Championship; March 5
1	Curry	6
2	Massachusetts–Dartmouth	1

Note: * denotes overtime period(s)

== 2006 ==
Seed	School	Conference Record	Seed	School	Conference Record
1	Massachusetts–Dartmouth	14–1–0	5	Wentworth	10–5–0
2	Curry	13–1–1	6	Johnson & Wales	7–6–2
3	Plymouth State	13–2–0	7	Fitchburg State	8–7–0
4	Nichols	10–3–2	8	Salve Regina	8–7–0

Quarterfinals; February 25
1	Massachusetts–Dartmouth	3
8	Salve Regina	2
2	Curry	5
7	Fitchburg State	1
3	Plymouth State	1
6	Johnson & Wales	0
4	Nichols	6*
5	Wentworth	5

Semifinals; March 1
1	Massachusetts–Dartmouth	6
4	Nichols	2
2	Curry	6
3	Plymouth State	0

Championship; March 4
1	Massachusetts–Dartmouth	3
2	Curry	1

Note: * denotes overtime period(s)

== 2007 ==
Seed	School	Conference Record	Seed	School	Conference Record
1	Massachusetts–Dartmouth	14–1–0	5	Fitchburg State	9–4–2
2	Curry	13–1–1	6	Johnson & Wales	9–6–0
3	Wentworth	11–2–2	7	Nichols	8–6–1
4	Plymouth State	10–4–1	8	Salve Regina	8–7–0

Quarterfinals; February 24–25
1	Massachusetts–Dartmouth	9
8	Salve Regina	2
2	Curry	7
7	Nichols	2
3	Wentworth	5
6	Johnson & Wales	1
4	Plymouth State	2
5	Fitchburg State	3

Semifinals; February 28
1	Massachusetts–Dartmouth	7
5	Fitchburg State	3
2	Curry	3
3	Wentworth	4

Championship; March 3
1	Massachusetts–Dartmouth	4
3	Wentworth	3

Note: * denotes overtime period(s)

== 2008 ==
Seed	School	Conference Record	Seed	School	Conference Record
1	Curry	14–1–1	5	Suffolk	10–6–0
2	Massachusetts–Dartmouth	13–3–0	6	Becker	9–6–1
3	Nichols	12–4–0	7	Salve Regina	8–5–3
4	Wentworth	10–5–1	8	Fitchburg State	8–5–3

Quarterfinals; March 1–2
1	Curry	2
8	Fitchburg State	7
2	Massachusetts–Dartmouth	5
7	Salve Regina	2
3	Nichols	5
6	Becker	1
4	Wentworth	2
5	Suffolk	3*

Semifinals; March 5
2	Massachusetts–Dartmouth	5
8	Fitchburg State	2
3	Nichols	4
5	Suffolk	2

Championship; March 8
1	Massachusetts–Dartmouth	5
3	Nichols	3

Note: * denotes overtime period(s)

== 2009 ==
Seed	School	Conference Record	Seed	School	Conference Record
1	Nichols	16–1–0	5	Fitchburg State	9–5–3
2	Curry	15–1–1	6	Becker	9–7–1
3	Wentworth	13–3–1	7	Johnson & Wales	8–7–2
4	Massachusetts–Dartmouth	13–3–1	8	Westfield State	7–7–3

Quarterfinals; February 28–March 1
1	Nichols	8
8	Westfield State	1
2	Curry	8
7	Johnson & Wales	2
3	Wentworth	5
6	Becker	1
4	Massachusetts–Dartmouth	2
5	Fitchburg State	3

Semifinals; March 4
1	Nichols	4
5	Fitchburg State	2
2	Curry	3
3	Wentworth	4

Championship; March 7
1	Nichols	4
3	Wentworth	3

Note: * denotes overtime period(s)

== 2010 ==
Seed	School	Conference Record	Seed	School	Conference Record
1	Wentworth	11–3–0	5	Nichols	7–6–1
2	Curry	10–3–1	6	Johnson & Wales	7–6–1
3	Suffolk	8–4–2	7	Western New England	2–12–0
4	Becker	8–6–0	8	Salve Regina	0–13–1

Quarterfinals; February 27–28
1	Wentworth	10
8	Salve Regina	7
2	Curry	13
7	Western New England	2
3	Suffolk	1
6	Johnson & Wales	3
4	Becker	5*
5	Nichols	4

Semifinals; March 3
1	Wentworth	3
6	Johnson & Wales	5
2	Curry	3
4	Becker	2

Championship; March 6
6	Johnson & Wales	4
2	Curry	5

Note: * denotes overtime period(s)

== 2011 ==
Seed	School	Conference Record	Seed	School	Conference Record
1	Curry	10–2–2	4	Becker	7–4–3
2	Wentworth	10–3–1	5	Nichols	6–8–0
3	Johnson & Wales	10–4–0	6	Western New England	5–9–0

Quarterfinals; February 27
3	Johnson & Wales	7
6	Western New England	1
4	Becker	5
5	Nichols	2

Semifinals; March 2
1	Curry	5
4	Becker	1
2	Wentworth	4*
3	Johnson & Wales	3

Championship; March 5
1	Curry	2*
2	Wentworth	1

Note: * denotes overtime period(s)

== 2012 ==
Seed	School	Conference Record	Seed	School	Conference Record
1	Wentworth	11–2–1	4	Western New England	8–5–1
2	Curry	11–3–0	5	Johnson & Wales	7–5–2
3	Nichols	9–4–1	6	Becker	4–9–1

Quarterfinals; February 25
3	Nichols	3
6	Becker	2
4	Western New England	2*
5	Johnson & Wales	1

Semifinals; February 29
1	Wentworth	5
4	Western New England	3
2	Curry	7
3	Nichols	2

Championship; March 3
1	Wentworth	1*
2	Curry	0

Note: * denotes overtime period(s)

== 2013 ==
Seed	School	Conference Record	Seed	School	Conference Record
1	Wentworth	10–2–2	4	Western New England	8–6–0
2	Nichols	9–4–1	5	Salve Regina	5–7–2
3	Curry	7–3–4	6	Johnson & Wales	5–8–1

Quarterfinals; February 23
3	Curry	4
6	Johnson & Wales	6
4	Western New England	4
5	Salve Regina	8

Semifinals; February 27
1	Wentworth	4
6	Johnson & Wales	1
2	Nichols	2
5	Salve Regina	3

Championship; March 3
1	Wentworth	3
5	Salve Regina	1

Note: * denotes overtime period(s)

== 2014 ==
Seed	School	Conference Record	Seed	School	Conference Record
1	Nichols	9–3–2	4	Johnson & Wales	7–6–1
2	Wentworth	9–5–0	5	Suffolk	6–7–1
3	Salve Regina	9–5–0	6	Curry	6–8–0

Quarterfinals; March 1
3	Salve Regina	1
6	Curry	4
4	Johnson & Wales	7
5	Suffolk	2

Semifinals; March 5
1	Nichols	4
6	Curry	3
2	Wentworth	4
5	Salve Regina	0

Championship; March 8
1	Nichols	3*
2	Wentworth	2

Note: * denotes overtime period(s)

== 2015 ==
Seed	School	Conference Record	Seed	School	Conference Record
1	Nichols	11–1–2	4	Curry	7–6–1
2	Salve Regina	9–4–1	5	Wentworth	6–6–2
3	Johnson & Wales	8–6–0	6	Suffolk	5–7–2

Quarterfinals; February 28
3	Johnson & Wales	5
6	Suffolk	0
4	Curry	8
5	Wentworth	4

Semifinals; March 4
1	Nichols	3
4	Curry	2
2	Salve Regina	9
3	Johnson & Wales	3

Championship; March 7
1	Nichols	3
2	Salve Regina	0

Note: * denotes overtime period(s)

== 2016 ==
Seed	School	Conference Record	Seed	School	Conference Record
1	Endicott	11–1–2	5	Wentworth	7–6–1
2	Nichols	9–4–1	6	Johnson & Wales	6–6–2
3	Salve Regina	8–6–0	7	Becker	5–7–2
4	Suffolk	8–6–0	-	-	-

Quarterfinals; February 27–28
2	Nichols	5
7	Becker	0
3	Salve Regina	2
6	Johnson & Wales	0
4	Suffolk	3
5	Wentworth	4*

Semifinals; March 2
1	Endicott	4
5	Wentworth	0
2	Nichols	0
3	Salve Regina	3

Championship; March 5
1	Endicott	0
3	Salve Regina	4

Note: * denotes overtime period(s)

== See also ==
- ECAC 2 Tournament
  Commonwealth Coast Conference ice hockey Tournament
