= ECAC 2 =

Defunct intercollegiate athletic conference

- Conference: NCAA
- Founded: 1964
- Folded: 1984
- Sports fielded: Ice hockey; men's: yes; women's: no
- Division: Division II
- No. of teams: between 14 and 32
- Region: New England and New York

ECAC 2 was an intercollegiate athletic conference affiliated with the NCAA's College Division. The league was created as a way to fairly divide the upper- and lower-class programs that had been members of ECAC Hockey. In 1984 the conference was split in two, creating ECAC East and ECAC West as completely independent leagues.

== History ==
=== Foundation ===
In 1950 college ice hockey received its first official conference, the Tri-State League, and while the conference possessed a minimal number of teams it routinely received one of the two eastern bids to the NCAA tournament. Concurrently, once seven western schools formed their own conference they were able to earn both western bids each year because there were no other colleges in competition for tournament berths. This situation left one eastern bid available for at least two dozen eastern schools. The arrangement came to a head in 1961 when both eastern bids were given to Tri-State League teams and very soon thereafter ECAC Hockey was formed. Following the same pattern as the western schools, every available eastern college joined the league, including the three remaining members of the Tri-State League, and the 28-team mega conference was born.

Due to the sheer number of universities in the conference none of the teams could guarantee playing each other so from the outset the conference standings were deemphasized and the eight teams that played in the conference tournament were selected by a committee based upon their perceived strength. This led to some schools like Williams, who finished 4th in the standings in 1962, not being invited to the tournament despite a 16–3–1 record against other ECAC schools because of their assumed weaker competition.

=== Split ===
The giant league remained in place for three seasons before being split in two. 15 teams that were willing to invest greater amounts of time, effort and money to their ice hockey programs remained in ECAC Hockey while the remaining 14 schools joined in a new league, ECAC 2. ECAC 2 was the first ice hockey conference formed for the NCAA College Division (which would later become Division III and Division II) and was virtually the only collection of schools in the country that played at the lower tier. After only seven years the conference had doubled in size and once again created a lower tier (ECAC 3) though only six schools chose to leave for the lesser division in 1971.

=== Further Growth and Dissolution ===
ECAC 2 remained the primary conference outside Division I for several years but started getting some competition in the 1970s. In that time, however, the conference continued to grow larger until it possessed over 30 members by 1975 and divided itself internally into two divisions (East and West) which would continue for another decade.

In 1978, five years after dividing the college division into two numerical divisions, the NCAA began the NCAA Division II Men's Ice Hockey Championship and the inaugural title was won by ECAC 2 member, Merrimack. ECAC 2 would win four more championships over the next five years and established itself as the premier league at the Division II level. In 1983, the NCAA announced that it would begin hosting a Division III Championship and require all schools who normally played at that level to submit bids for the new tournament. Even though ECAC 2 technically competed at the D-II level that year, most of its member teams that made tournament appearances did so in the D-III series.

With the vast majority of all programs needing to reclassify for the D-III tournament, ECAC 2 dropped down to the lower level in the summer of 1984. That change, however, was not enough to keep the league as one entity. During the season, it was divided into two conferences with both ECAC East and ECAC West holding separate tournaments at the end of the year.

=== Legacy ===
Most of the 46 programs that played in the ECAC 2 are still going as of 2018, with many having jumped up to the Division I ranks. While several schools have won Division III national titles in the years since the conference ended, Maine, UMass, and Union have won Division I national titles.

=== ECAC 2 Tournament ===
The ECAC 2 played a conference tournament from 1967 through its final full season in 1984. The tournament served as the de facto Division II National Championship until the NCAA instituted a national tournament in 1978. That year ECAC 2 effectively split its conference in two by having two division tournaments (East and West) with all games between the two divisions counting for the regular season.

== Member schools ==
In its 20-year existence ECAC 2 had 45 individual schools as members.

	Location	Athletic nickname	Enrollment^{#}	Colors	Founded	Joined	Left	Succeeding Conference	Current Conference^{†}
American International College	Springfield, Massachusetts	Yellow Jackets	1,700		1885	1964	1984	ECAC East	Atlantic Hockey
Amherst College	Amherst, Massachusetts	Lord Jeffs (Note: Amherst's original, unofficial nickname for its teams, the Lord Jeffs, was retired in 2016 due to controversy over the propriety of honoring Lord Jeffrey Amherst.)	1,817		1821	1964	1972	ECAC 3	NESCAC
Assumption College	Worcester, Massachusetts	Greyhounds	2,753		1904	1967	1971	ECAC 3	Northeast-10
United States Military Academy	West Point, New York	Cadets (Note: Army's team was known as the Cadets while they played in ECAC 2.)	4,400		1802	1973	1980 (Note: Army played a partial Division II/III schedule from 1980 thru 1986.)	ECAC Hockey	Atlantic Hockey
Babson College	Wellesley, Massachusetts	Beavers	1,800		1919	1968	1984	ECAC East	NEHC
Boston State College	Boston, Massachusetts	Warriors	–		1872	1966	1982	Merged with UMass Boston (Note: Boston State merged with Massachusetts-Boston in 1982.)	
Bowdoin College	Brunswick, Maine	Polar Bears	1,805		1794	1964	1984	ECAC East	NESCAC
Bridgewater State University	Bridgewater, Massachusetts	Bears	9,628		1840	1970	1981	Dropped Program	
State University of New York at Brockport	Brockport, New York	Golden Eagles	8,275		1867	1976	1984	ECAC West	SUNYAC
Bryant College	Smithfield, Rhode Island	Bulldogs	3,751		1863	1975	1980	Dropped Program	
University at Buffalo	Buffalo, New York	Bulls	30,648		1846	1971	1984	ECAC West	Dropped Program
Colby College	Waterville, Maine	Mules	1,838		1813	1964	1984	ECAC East	NESCAC
University of Connecticut	Storrs, Connecticut	Huskies	32,027		1881	1964	1984	ECAC East	Hockey East
State University of New York College at Cortland	Cortland, New York	Red Dragons	7,234		1868	1976	1984	ECAC West	SUNYAC
Elmira College	Elmira, New York	Soaring Eagles	1,170		1855	1976	1984	ECAC West	UCHC
Framingham State University	Framingham, Massachusetts	Rams	6,156		1839	1979	1982	ECAC 3	MASCAC
State University of New York at Geneseo	Geneseo, New York	Knights	5,585		1871	1976	1984	ECAC West	SUNYAC
Hamilton College	Clinton, New York	Continentals	1,864		1793	1964	1984	ECAC West	NESCAC
College of the Holy Cross	Worcester, Massachusetts	Crusaders	2,897		1843	1967	1984	ECAC East	Atlantic Hockey
Ithaca College	Ithaca, New York	Bombers	6,969		1892	1967	1976	Dropped Program	
Lehigh University	Bethlehem, Pennsylvania	Mountain Hawks	5,080		1865	1969	1971	ECAC 3	Dropped Program
University of Maine	Orono, Maine	Black Bears	11,222		1865	1977	1979	ECAC Hockey	Hockey East
University of Massachusetts Amherst	Amherst, Massachusetts	Minutemen	27,269		1863	1964	1979	Dropped Program	Hockey East
University of Massachusetts Boston	Dorchester, Massachusetts	Beacons	10,600		1894	1982	1984	ECAC East	NEHC
Massachusetts Institute of Technology	Cambridge, Massachusetts	Engineers	4,512		1861	1964	1971	ECAC 3	Dropped Program
University of Lowell	Lowell, Massachusetts	Chiefs (Note: Massachusetts–Lowell, formerly Lowell Tech and Lowell University, changed their nickname from 'Terriers' to 'Chiefs' in 1971 and then to 'River Hawks' in 1994.)	18,316		1894	1968	1983	ECAC Hockey	Hockey East
Merrimack College	North Andover, Massachusetts	Warriors	3,653		1947	1964	1984	ECAC East	Hockey East
Middlebury College	Middlebury, Vermont	Panthers	2,507		1800	1964	1984	ECAC East	NESCAC
New England College	Henniker, New Hampshire	Pilgrims	1,460		1946	1971	1984	ECAC East	NEHC
University of New Hampshire	Durham, New Hampshire	Wildcats	14,761		1866	1964	1966	ECAC Hockey	Hockey East
University of New Haven	West Haven, Connecticut	Chargers	4,800		1920	1967	1983	Dropped Program	
Nichols College	Dudley, Massachusetts	Bison	1,459		1815	1967	1971	ECAC 3	CCC
North Adams State College	North Adams, Massachusetts	Mowhawks	1,891		1894	1975	1984	ECAC East	Dropped Program
Norwich University	Northfield, Vermont	Cadets	2,000		1819	1964	1984	ECAC East	NEHC
State University of New York at Oswego	Oswego, New York	Lakers	8,909		1861	1967	1984	ECAC West	SUNYAC
State University of New York at Plattsburgh	Plattsburgh, New York	Cardinals	6,358		1889	1976	1984	ECAC West	SUNYAC
State University of New York at Potsdam	Potsdam, New York	Bears	4,325		1816	1976	1984	ECAC West	SUNYAC
Rochester Institute of Technology	Henrietta, New York	Tigers	16,842		1829	1980	1984	ECAC West	Atlantic Hockey
Saint Anselm College	Goffstown, New Hampshire	Hawks	1,945		1889	1969	1984	ECAC East	Northeast-10
Salem State University	Salem, Massachusetts	Vikings	10,125		1854	1967	1984	ECAC East	MASCAC
Union College	Schenectady, New York	Dutchmen	2,200		1795	1975	1984	ECAC West	ECAC Hockey
University of Vermont	Burlington, Vermont	Catamounts	11,999		1791	1964	1974	ECAC Hockey	Hockey East
Westfield State University	Westfield, Massachusetts	Owls	5,166		1874	1978	1984	ECAC East	MASCAC
Williams College	Williamstown, Massachusetts	Ephs	2,124		1793	1964	1984	ECAC East	NESCAC
Worcester State University	Worcester, Massachusetts	Lancers	6,221		1874	1967	1971	ECAC 3	MASCAC

# enrollment in 2018
† as of 2018

== See also ==
- ECAC Hockey
- ECAC East
- ECAC West
- ECAC 3
