= College players in the NHL entry draft =

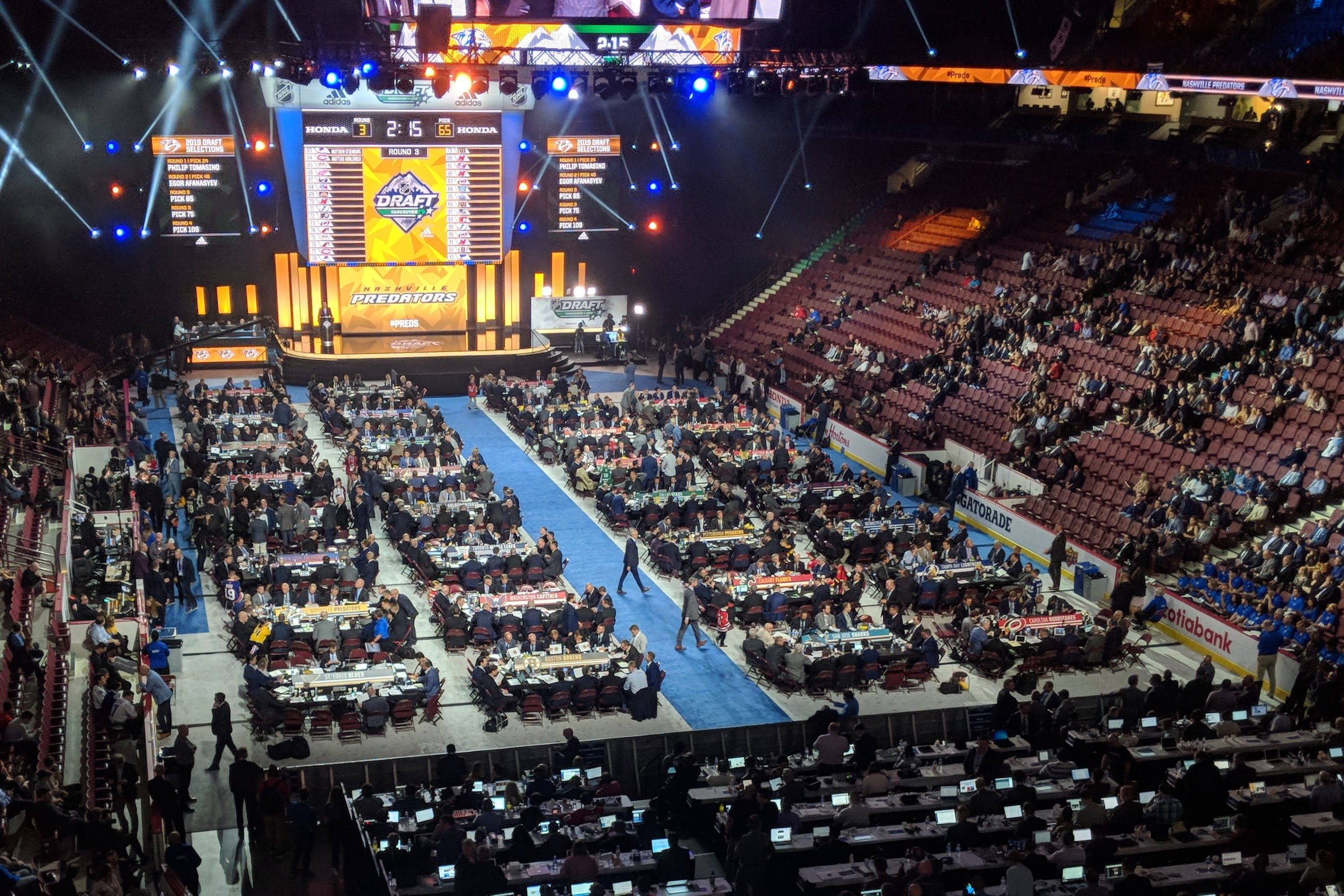
Floor of the Rogers Arena during the 2019 NHL entry draft

The NHL entry draft has been increasingly targeting college and college-bound players as more and more alumni have found their way into the league over the years.

== History ==
After World War II, college hockey was seen by most NHL executives as a backwater league for players who weren't good enough to play professionally. College teams were viewed in such a poor light that star junior players like Bill Hay and Red Berenson were told that attending college might prevent NHL teams from giving them a chance. In spite of this reticence, some players were able to reach the NHL in the 1960s though almost all were Canadian-born.

When the NHL instituted its first draft in 1963, this bias against US colleges persisted. Despite most youth players already being under contract, no active collegiate player was selected until 1967. That year, Detroit selected Al Karlander, a forward for Michigan Tech, with the 17th overall selection. He would go on to play parts of four seasons for the Wings. The following year, John Marks became the first college player selected in the first round when Chicago chose him with the 9th overall selection. These selections coincided with the rapid expansion of the NHL as the league doubled its size in 1967, providing a much greater opportunity for college alumni to play professionally. The NHL continued to expand over the next several years and, with the addition of the WHA, there were 30 major professional teams in 1972 along with their affiliated minor league programs. With the sheer number of available roster spots, the NHL could no longer afford to ignore college hockey and the trends in the NHL entry draft demonstrated as much.

By the end of the 1970s, the WHA had withered and the NHL absorbed the remains of its former rival. The NHL draft was reorganized in 1979 with the age limit lowered from 20- to 19-years old and, for the first year, limited to just six rounds. This reduction in picks had a corresponding drop in the total number of college players selected as well as the overall percentage. The '79 draft saw just 13% of players taken with ties to college programs, the lowest total since 1970. This was mostly due to the fact that NHL teams were hesitant to spend their high draft picks on college players. The following year, the age limit was lowered once more to 18-years olds, which now meant that most selections would be for players who were not yet attending college. Despite this, the number of college-bound players rapidly increased due to the NHL enlarging the draft to 10 rounds. Within two years, the draft had been expanded to twelve rounds, encompassing more than 250 selections, and college-affiliated players were some of the main beneficiaries. By the mid-80s, at least 1/3 of all players selected had ties to college programs. Additionally, after the furor caused by Detroit signing Adam Oates, the NHL also introduced a supplemental draft which was used exclusively for over-aged college players no longer eligible for the standard draft.

The late 80s and early 90s were the high point for college players in the NHL draft but the situation rapidly changed following the collapse of the Soviet Union. For years, NHL teams had drafted players behind the Iron Curtain on the off chance that one day they might be able to obtain the services of some of the best players in the world. Beginning in 1991, there was no longer a geopolitical barrier blocking such a move and NHL drafting tendencies quickly shifted to take advantage. The huge influx of players from eastern bloc countries dampened the influence of college hockey on the draft. In 1992 college players accounted for just 20% of drafted players, less than half of the total from 1990. Even with the NHL adding new teams across the sunbelt, college hockey's influence was dwindling and experienced a crisis in 1995.

Due to the lack of interest with the supplemental draft, the 1994 CBA eliminated that draft completely. Additionally, the standard draft saw two rounds eliminated, dropping the number of selections from 286 to 234. However, the biggest impact to college hockey was the general lack of interest with American players. Just 16 Americans were selected in 1995, putting the US in 4th behind both Russia and the Czech Republic and barely ahead of Finland. This calamity for USA Hockey was felt most keenly by college hockey which saw just 12 selection in the entire draft and none in the first 5 rounds. Part of the problem was that for years college hockey had been critiqued as being an offensive playground where defense was optional. However, because the NHL in the 80s and early 90s had the same ethos, this was not seen as a hindrance for players of that style. When the New Jersey Devils won the Stanley Cup in 1995 with a defensive-first style, suddenly the offensive-heavy NCAA was no longer an asset. Fortunately, college teams were quick to adapt to the new state of affairs and new styles of play helped to rapidly reverse the situation. Just one year later, college hockey more than tripled the number of drafted players and continued a steady rise over the next several years.

Beginning with the 2002 draft, college hockey was able to find a firm spot in the player development hierarchy. Since then, between 1/4 and 1/3 of players taken in the NHL draft made their way through the college ranks. Only once (2013) has college hockey failed to have a player taken in the first round but it is far more common to see one of the top selections hail from a college program. Over a 10-year span, college hockey has seen at least one of its players taken in the first ten selections. 2021 was probably college hockey's most impressive performance in that regard with four of the first five picks all having ties to college programs.

As the NCAA's power waned near the quarter pole of the 21st century, college hockey joined in on the erosion by challenging the eligibility rules. Arizona State became the first team to receive a commitment form a Canadian Hockey League player when Braxton Whitehead agreed to join the program for the 2025-26 season. It took less than two months for the NCAA to remove the long-standing prohibition and allow major-junior players to play college hockey in the United States for the first time since the early 1970s. The first draft under these new rules (2025) saw the number of collegiate players selected in the draft increase significantly though only slightly above the 1/4-1/3 range that had become commonplace. It's uncertain how the new rules will affect college hockey's role in the draft going forward.

== Players by college ==
As of July 1, 2025

School	Players drafted	By round										Reached NHL
School	Players drafted	1	2	3	4	5	6	7	8	9	10+	Reached NHL
Air Force	1	0	0	0	0	0	0	0	0	1	0	0
Alaska	9	0	0	1	0	2	0	1	1	1	3	4
Alaska Anchorage	9	0	0	0	0	1	0	1	2	1	4	2
American International	1	0	0	0	0	0	0	0	1	0	0	1
Arizona State	8	1	3	0	1	3	0	1	0	0	0	2
Army	1	0	0	0	0	0	0	1	0	0	0	1
Bemidji State	5	0	0	0	0	2	0	2	1	0	0	1
Bentley	1	0	0	0	0	0	0	1	0	0	0	1
Boston College	161	27	16	19	16	19	19	12	8	9	15	70
Boston University	201	25	34	28	20	21	19	16	14	8	17	79
Bowling Green	60	1	0	5	10	5	10	9	3	6	11	28
Brown	26	0	2	1	1	2	4	4	2	3	7	7
Clarkson	84	0	0	10	5	9	13	18	7	7	15	17
Colgate	34	0	0	0	1	6	5	5	3	3	11	7
Colorado College	77	2	2	3	5	11	11	14	7	11	9	29
Connecticut	14	1	3	0	2	1	4	3	0	0	0	2
Cornell	83	2	8	10	6	9	13	12	7	9	7	26
Dartmouth	26	1	1	2	2	3	3	3	2	4	5	10
Denver	134	5	19	15	21	15	16	20	5	5	13	51
Ferris State	22	0	0	0	1	3	3	3	7	1	4	4
Harvard	118	3	7	17	18	14	18	18	7	7	9	34
Illinois–Chicago	1	0	0	0	0	0	0	0	0	1	0	0
Kent State	2	0	0	0	0	0	0	0	0	0	2	0
Lake Superior State	57	1	2	1	5	4	5	6	7	9	14	14
Maine	78	3	6	8	10	10	12	11	2	4	10	39
Massachusetts	46	2	4	6	10	5	6	9	0	1	3	15
Massachusetts Lowell	48	1	0	2	0	8	7	9	3	6	13	8
Merrimack	25	0	0	3	4	1	5	1	3	2	6	6
Miami	60	3	2	5	12	5	9	9	4	3	7	22
Michigan	185	36	23	26	21	15	10	18	10	9	17	95
Michigan State	128	13	20	11	10	15	19	16	7	5	12	57
Michigan Tech	76	0	4	5	6	7	15	15	9	6	9	24
Michigan–Dearborn	1	0	0	0	0	0	0	0	0	1	0	0
Minnesota	241	26	33	29	28	29	27	24	13	17	16	106
Minnesota Duluth	125	5	11	7	19	15	12	17	14	11	14	43
Minnesota State	20	0	4	2	3	3	3	3	0	2	0	8
New Hampshire	98	2	7	7	4	9	17	14	5	15	18	28
Niagara	1	0	0	0	1	0	0	0	0	0	0	0
North Dakota	199	24	24	25	25	25	25	16	12	6	17	88
Northeastern	70	2	5	7	5	4	10	15	5	5	12	26
Northern Arizona	2	0	0	0	0	0	0	1	0	0	1	1
Northern Michigan	60	0	2	3	6	6	8	6	7	7	14	15
Norwich	1	0	0	0	0	0	0	1	0	0	0	0
Notre Dame	93	3	10	13	12	14	10	12	5	6	8	31
Ohio State	55	3	3	2	5	11	6	13	3	3	7	20
Omaha	34	0	2	2	8	7	8	4	3	0	0	10
Penn State	16	1	1	2	2	1	4	5	0	0	0	1
Princeton	25	0	0	1	3	1	2	2	5	3	8	5
Providence	126	6	4	16	13	25	12	8	15	12	15	41
Quinnipiac	19	0	0	3	2	4	4	6	0	0	0	5
Rensselaer	60	0	2	1	9	7	7	6	8	8	12	14
Sacred Heart	1	0	0	0	0	0	0	1	0	0	0	0
Saint Anselm	1	0	0	0	1	0	0	0	0	0	0	1
St. Cloud State	67	2	6	6	5	9	10	13	5	4	8	24
St. Lawrence	47	1	1	1	2	5	6	3	5	10	13	13
St. Thomas	2	0	0	0	0	1	0	1	0	0	0	0
Union	9	0	0	1	1	2	1	2	1	0	1	1
United States International	1	0	0	0	0	0	1	0	0	0	0	0
Vermont	54	0	2	3	7	7	12	4	5	6	9	9
Western Michigan	63	0	3	4	8	6	9	10	5	4	14	19
Wisconsin	182	19	22	11	22	18	15	28	20	13	16	79
Yale	42	1	0	2	4	8	5	9	3	3	7	12

Note: Some drafted players played for multiple colleges. In such cases the player is listed either with the school that they were attending at the time of their draft or the school that they were committed to begin attending.

== Players by draft team ==
NHL team	Players drafted	By round										Reached NHL
NHL team	Players drafted	1	2	3	4	5	6	7	8	9	10+	Reached NHL
Anaheim Ducks	12	1	1	0	0	1	1	5	2	0	1	5
Arizona Coyotes	6	0	0	1	0	2	0	1	1	1	0	3
Atlanta Flames	18	1	0	1	2	2	3	3	3	2	1	8
Boston Bruins	88	4	3	5	9	6	9	7	11	12	23	34
Buffalo Sabres	58	4	2	5	7	6	9	3	6	1	15	21
Calgary Flames	65	4	9	9	4	7	6	5	5	10	6	22
California Golden Seals	11	0	1	2	2	3	1	0	1	0	1	5
Carolina Hurricanes	5	0	1	1	0	0	0	2	1	0	0	2
Chicago Blackhawks	82	1	1	3	9	8	15	10	10	9	16	20
Colorado Avalanche	10	1	1	1	1	1	0	1	2	2	0	4
Colorado Rockies	12	0	0	2	0	0	4	1	1	2	2	6
Dallas Stars	6	1	0	0	0	1	1	1	1	0	1	3
Detroit Red Wings	74	2	5	4	2	10	4	7	10	8	23	24
Edmonton Oilers	58	1	4	5	6	6	4	6	11	6	9	22
Florida Panthers	5	0	1	1	0	0	1	1	1	0	0	2
Hartford Whalers	59	1	1	3	5	5	5	4	8	12	15	13
Kansas City Scouts	1	0	0	0	0	0	0	0	1	0	0	0
Los Angeles Kings	75	1	1	2	4	9	7	11	12	8	20	25
Minnesota North Stars	91	2	6	12	7	7	8	9	10	12	18	32
Montreal Canadiens	134	1	6	5	10	10	12	13	13	11	39	47
Nashville Predators	2	0	0	1	1	0	0	0	0	0	0	0
New Jersey Devils	65	3	7	6	7	5	7	6	7	6	10	29
New York Islanders	83	3	2	3	4	11	9	10	7	10	24	24
New York Rangers	106	4	2	4	12	8	11	11	11	10	33	38
Ottawa Senators	14	0	1	1	1	0	3	1	3	2	2	3
Philadelphia Flyers	83	2	8	3	5	2	7	7	10	8	26	25
Pittsburgh Penguins	75	1	5	4	6	8	8	9	6	12	16	26
Quebec Nordiques	52	1	1	3	4	7	8	4	4	5	15	18
San Jose Sharks	9	0	0	0	0	1	0	1	3	2	2	3
St. Louis Blues	114	2	7	7	7	7	15	9	13	11	34	37
Tampa Bay Lightning	3	0	0	0	0	0	1	0	0	1	1	2
Toronto Maple Leafs	68	1	0	2	7	6	7	6	8	11	20	21
Vancouver Canucks	65	1	2	6	3	5	10	7	12	8	11	22
Washington Capitals	48	0	4	3	6	3	3	3	5	6	14	15
Winnipeg Jets (1972–1996)	73	2	6	4	9	6	8	9	7	9	13	29

== Players by draft year ==
= Did not play in the NHL	= NHL All-Star team	= NHL All-Star	= NHL All-Star and NHL All-Star team	= Hall of Famer

Year	#	Total	Earliest	NHL team	Player	College team
1963	1	21 (5%)	3rd round; 14th overall	Boston Bruins	Roger Bamburak	North Dakota
1964	5	24 (4%)	1st round; 2nd overall	Boston Bruins	Alex Campbell	St. Lawrence
1965	0	11 (0%)	—	—	—	—
1966	1	24 (4%)	4th round; 21st overall	Chicago Black Hawks	Brian Morenz	Denver
1967	1	18 (6%)	2nd round; 17th overall	Detroit Red Wings	Al Karlander	Michigan Tech
1968	2	24 (8%)	1st round; 9th overall	Chicago Black Hawks	John Marks	North Dakota
1969	7	84 (8%)	3rd round; 30th overall	St. Louis Blues	Bernie Gagnon	Michigan
1970	15	115 (13%)	2nd round; 23rd overall	St. Louis Blues	Murray Keogan	Minnesota Duluth
1971	21	117 (18%)	3rd round; 31st overall	Montreal Canadiens	Jim Cahoon	North Dakota
1972	21	152 (14%)	2nd round; 26th overall	Detroit Red Wings	Pierre Guité	Pennsylvania
1973	25	168 (15%)	4th round; 53rd overall	Atlanta Flames	Dean Talafous	Wisconsin
1974	41	247 (17%)	2nd round; 21st overall	California Golden Seals	Bruce Affleck	Denver
1975	61	217 (28%)	2nd round; 19th overall	Washington Capitals	Peter Scamurra	Wisconsin
1976	30	135 (22%)	1st round; 8th overall	Atlanta Flames	David Shand	Michigan
1977	46	185 (25%)	2nd round; 27th overall	St. Louis Blues	Neil Labatte	Brown
1978	73	234 (31%)	2nd round; 24th overall	Minnesota North Stars	Steve Christoff	Minnesota
1979	16	126 (13%)	1st round; 11th overall	Buffalo Sabres	Mike Ramsey	Minnesota
1980	55	210 (26%)	1st round; 8th overall	Detroit Red Wings	Mike Blaisdell	Wisconsin
1981	48	211 (23%)	1st round; 9th overall	New York Rangers	James Patrick	North Dakota
1982	73	252 (29%)	1st round; 21st overall	New York Islanders	Patrick Flatley	Wisconsin
1983	70	242 (29%)	1st round; 10th overall	Buffalo Sabres	Normand Lacombe	New Hampshire
1984	92	250 (37%)	1st round; 6th overall	Los Angeles Kings	Craig Redmond	Denver
1985	84	252 (33%)	1st round; 2nd overall	Pittsburgh Penguins	Craig Simpson	Michigan State
1986	92	252 (37%)	1st round; 1st overall	Detroit Red Wings	Joe Murphy	Michigan State
1987	105	252 (42%)	1st round; 19th overall	Calgary Flames	Bryan Deasley	Michigan
1988	111	252 (44%)	1st round; 9th overall	St. Louis Blues	Rod Brind'Amour	Michigan State
1989	106	252 (42%)	1st round; 5th overall	New Jersey Devils	Bill Guerin	Boston College
1990	105	252 (42%)	1st round; 13th overall	New York Rangers	Michael Stewart	Michigan State
1991	95	264 (36%)	1st round; 4th overall	New York Islanders	Scott Lachance	Boston University
1992	53	264 (20%)	1st round; 7th overall	Philadelphia Flyers	Ryan Sittler	Michigan
1993	70	286 (24%)	1st round; 4th overall	Mighty Ducks of Anaheim	Paul Kariya	Maine
1994	61	286 (21%)	1st round; 20th overall	Dallas Stars	Jason Botterill	Michigan
1995	12	234 (5%)	6th round; 146th overall	Chicago Blackhawks	Marc Magliarditi	Western Michigan
1996	41	241 (17%)	1st round; 7th overall	Buffalo Sabres	Erik Rasmussen	Minnesota
1997	43	246 (17%)	2nd round; 27th overall	Boston Bruins	Ben Clymer	Minnesota
1998	44	258 (17%)	1st round; 26th overall	New Jersey Devils	Mike Van Ryn	Michigan
1999	58	272 (21%)	1st round; 14th overall	San Jose Sharks	Jeff Jillson	Michigan
2000	67	293 (23%)	1st round; 1st overall	New York Islanders	Rick DiPietro	Boston University
2001	56	289 (19%)	1st round; 7th overall	Montreal Canadiens	Mike Komisarek	Michigan
2002	78	291 (27%)	1st round; 5th overall	Pittsburgh Penguins	Ryan Whitney	Boston University
2003	72	292 (25%)	1st round; 5th overall	Buffalo Sabres	Thomas Vanek	Minnesota
2004	87	291 (30%)	1st round; 5th overall	Phoenix Coyotes	Blake Wheeler	Minnesota
2005	69	230 (30%)	1st round; 3rd overall	Carolina Hurricanes	Jack Johnson	Michigan
2006	69	213 (32%)	1st round; 1st overall	St. Louis Blues	Erik Johnson	Minnesota
2007	71	211 (34%)	1st round; 2nd overall	Philadelphia Flyers	James van Riemsdyk	New Hampshire
2008	62	211 (29%)	1st round; 7th overall	Nashville Predators	Colin Wilson	Boston University
2009	61	211 (29%)	1st round; 16th overall	Minnesota Wild	Nick Leddy	Minnesota
2010	56	210 (27%)	1st round; 14th overall	St. Louis Blues	Jaden Schwartz	Colorado College
2011	54	211 (26%)	1st round; 14th overall	Dallas Stars	Jamie Oleksiak	Northeastern
2012	67	211 (32%)	1st round; 9th overall	Winnipeg Jets	Jacob Trouba	Michigan
2013	56	211 (27%)	2nd round; 31st overall	Florida Panthers	Ian McCoshen	Boston College
2014	56	210 (27%)	1st round; 15th overall	Detroit Red Wings	Dylan Larkin	Michigan
2015	53	211 (25%)	1st round; 2nd overall	Buffalo Sabres	Jack Eichel	Boston University
2016	60	211 (28%)	1st round; 7th overall	Arizona Coyotes	Clayton Keller	Boston University
2017	59	217 (27%)	1st round; 4th overall	Colorado Avalanche	Cale Makar	Massachusetts
2018	66	217 (30%)	1st round; 4th overall	Ottawa Senators	Brady Tkachuk	Boston University
2019	71	217 (33%)	1st round; 5th overall	Los Angeles Kings	Alex Turcotte	Wisconsin
2020	65	217 (30%)	1st round; 5th overall	Ottawa Senators	Jake Sanderson	North Dakota
2021	55	224 (25%)	1st round; 1st overall	Buffalo Sabres	Owen Power	Michigan
2022	69	225 (31%)	1st round; 3rd overall	Arizona Coyotes	Logan Cooley	Minnesota
2023	68	224 (30%)	1st round; 3rd overall	Columbus Blue Jackets	Adam Fantilli	Michigan
2024	58	225 (26%)	1st round; 1st overall	San Jose Sharks	Macklin Celebrini	Boston University
2025	77	224 (34%)	1st round; 6th overall	Philadelphia Flyers	Porter Martone	Michigan State
