= ECAC West =

US college athletic conference

Eastern College Athletic Conference - West
- Conference: NCAA
- Founded: 1984
- Folded: 2017
- Commissioner: Rudy Keeling
- Sports fielded: Ice hockey; men's: 6 teams; women's: 10 teams
- Division: Division III
- No. of teams: 12
- Headquarters: Danbury, Connecticut
- Region: New York, Pennsylvania and Maryland
- Website: Men: http://www.ecacsports.com/index.aspx?path=mhockey_mwest Women: http://www.ecacsports.com/index.aspx?path=whockey

Locations
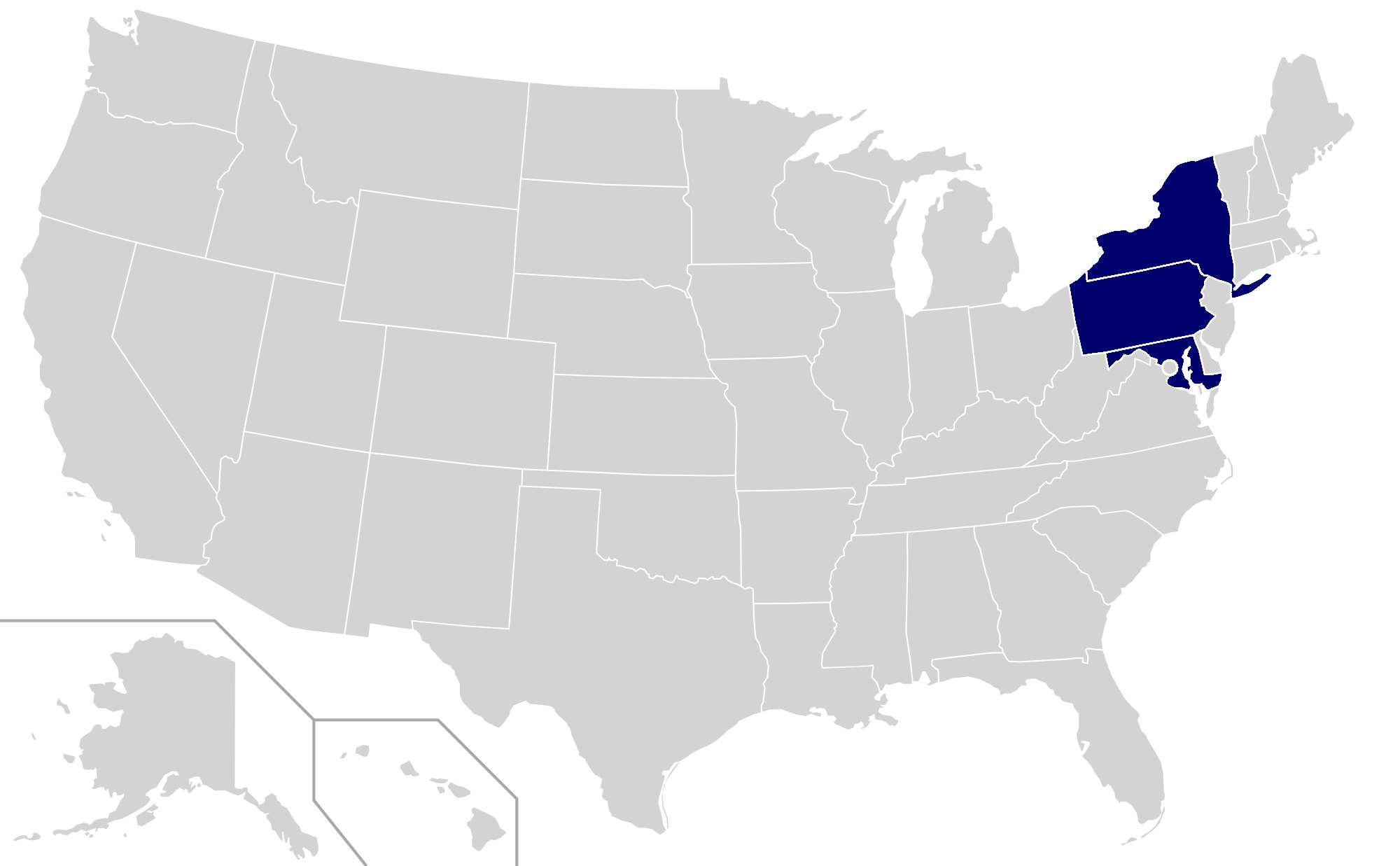

ECAC West was a college athletic conference which operated in the northeastern United States until 2017. It participated in the NCAA's Division III as a hockey-only conference. The conference ceased to exist after the end of the 2016–17 season when most joined the newly formed United Collegiate Hockey Conference or Northeast Women's Hockey League.

== History ==
ECAC West was officially formed in 1984 when ECAC 2 was split in two and both new conferences dropped down to Division III. The conference consisted entirely of schools from upstate New York until 1988 when Mercyhurst joined. In 1992 all universities that were members SUNYAC and a few other schools left when Mercyhurst took part in the effort that was made to restart the Division II Championship, leaving just seven teams in the ECAC West. After two more schools dropped their programs the conference was down to five teams in 1994 but it began to recover when Niagara joined in 1996. In 1998, the conference lost two programs when the MAAC began sponsoring a Division I ice hockey conference followed by a third just one year later. When the Division II Tournament ended in 1999 the conference returned to D-III and was left with only four schools but in 2001 it began to sponsor women's hockey as well and its ranks immediately swelled to nine universities. The conference roster continued to grow, reaching 15 in 2016–17 but after that season all but one league member left to join either the United Collegiate Hockey Conference or Northeast Women's Hockey League with the lone remaining school (Hobart) joining the New England Hockey Conference.

== Members ==
	Location	Athletic nickname	Colors	Founded	Joined (M)	Left (M)	Current Conference (M)^{†}	Joined (W)	Left (W)	Current Conference (W)^{†}
Binghamton University	Binghamton, New York	Bearcats		1946	1987	1992	Dropped Program	–	–	–
State University of New York at Brockport	Brockport, New York	Golden Eagles		1867	1984	1992	SUNYAC	–	–	–
University at Buffalo	Buffalo, New York	Bulls		1846	1984	1987	Dropped Program	–	–	–
Buffalo State College	Buffalo, New York	Bengals		1871	–	–	–	2001	2017	NEWHL
Canisius College	Buffalo, New York	Golden Griffins		1870	1987	1998	Atlantic Hockey	–	–	–
Chatham University	Pittsburgh, Pennsylvania	Cougars		1869	–	–	–	2002	2017	UCHC
State University of New York at Cortland	Cortland, New York	Red Dragons		1868	1984	1992	SUNYAC	2001	2017	NEWHL
Elmira College	Elmira, New York	Soaring Eagles		1855	1984	2017	UCHC	2001	2017	UCHC
State University of New York at Fredonia	Fredonia, New York	Blue Devils		1826	1987	1992	SUNYAC	–	–	–
State University of New York at Geneseo	Geneseo, New York	Knights		1871	1984	1992	SUNYAC	–	–	–
Hamilton College	Clinton, New York	Continentals		1793	1984	1992	NESCAC	–	–	–
Hobart College	Geneva, New York	Statesmen		1822	1985	2017	NEHC	–	–	–
Lebanon Valley College	Annville, Pennsylvania	Flying Dutchmen		1866	2004	2017 (Note: Lebanon Valley suspended their program from 2010 to 2016.)	UCHC	–	–	–
Manhattanville College	Purchase, New York	Valiants		1815	1999	2017	UCHC	–	–	–
Mercyhurst University	Erie, Pennsylvania	Lakers		1926	1988	1999	Atlantic Hockey	–	–	–
Nazareth College	Pittsford, New York	Golden Flyers		1924	2012	2017	UCHC	–	–	–
Neumann University	Aston, Pennsylvania	Knights		1965	2001	2017	UCHC	2001	2017	UCHC
Niagara University	Lewiston, New York	Purple Eagles		1856	1996	1998	Atlantic Hockey	–	–	–
State University of New York at Oswego	Oswego, New York	Lakers		1891	1984	1992	SUNYAC	2006	2017	NEWHL
State University of New York at Plattsburgh	Plattsburgh, New York	Cardinals		1889	1984	1992	SUNYAC	2001	2017	NEWHL
State University of New York at Potsdam	Potsdam, New York	Bears		1816	1984	1992	SUNYAC	2008	2017	NEWHL
Rochester Institute of Technology	Henrietta, New York	Tigers		1829	1984	2005	Atlantic Hockey	2007	2012	CHA
University of Scranton	Scranton, Pennsylvania	Royals		1888	1991	1994	Dropped Program	–	–	–
St. Bonaventure University	Allegany, New York	Bonnies		1858	1986	1993	Dropped Program	–	–	–
Stevenson University	Stevenson, Maryland	Mustangs		1947	2016	2017	UCHC	–	–	–
Union College	Schenectady, New York	Dutchmen		1795	1984	1991	ECAC Hockey	–	–	–
Utica College	Utica, New York	Pioneers		1946	2001	2017	UCHC	2001	2017	UCHC
William Smith College	Geneva, New York	Herons		1908	–	–	–	2014	2017	UCHC

† as of 2018

== Membership timeline ==
Men Women Both
