= Nathaniel Hawthorne College =

Private college in Antrim, New Hampshire (1962–1988)

- Seal of Nathaniel Hawthorne College
- Other name: Hawthorne College
- Type: Private
- Active: 1962–1988
- Founder: Kenneth McLaughlin
- Affiliations: Florida Institute of Technology
- Location: Antrim, New Hampshire, United States
- Colors: Green, white, and gold
- Sporting affiliations: ECAC Northeast
- Mascot: Highlander

Nathaniel Hawthorne College, later Hawthorne College, was a nonprofit private liberal arts college in Antrim, New Hampshire. It opened in 1962. The college merged with the Florida Institute of Technology in 1982. It closed in 1988.

== History ==
Nathaniel Hawthorne College was a nonprofit private coeducational liberal arts college founded in 1962 by John Berrigan, Kenneth McLaughlin, and Joseph Whelton who purchased the property for the college. McLaughlin served as the college's president.

The college had 100 students for its first semester in September 1962. Its enrollment was quickly boosted to as many as 700 students by men seeking to avoid the draft for the Vietnam War. The college was accredited by the New England Association of Colleges and Secondary Schools in December 1971. In 1971, it had 800 students.

When the war ended, enrollment dropped to 500 students, and the college was forced to lay off some of its faculty. McLaughlin decided that continuing as just a liberal arts college would bring about the college's extinction. He was a noted "aviation enthusiast" and already owned a private airport. In 1971, a curriculum in aviation was added. By 1980, aviation was the college's mainstay, helping to keep it open and attracting some 65 percent of its students. The college owned nineteen aircraft for the 315 enrollees in the program in the fall of 1979. Of the 528 students enrolled that semester, fifteen percent were from foreign countries, including France, Greece, Japan, Venezuela, and several African countries. As a result, the college began offering special English classes.

In 1982, the college merged with the Florida Institute of Technology. Its academic focus changed to aeronautics, business, and computer science. It also shortened its name to Hawthorne College and was rechartered by the State of New Hampshire.

The college's enrollment declined, and its operating debt increased to $400,000 a year ($1,133,568 in today's money). In 1987, it had less than 300 students. Time magazine noted that even with the inducement of flying lessons, Hawthorne had less than half the number of day students it needed to fill its freshman class. With long-term debts over $4 million, the college declared bankruptcy in 1988 and began plans to liquidate its assets. It graduated its last class in April 1988. The college officially closed in 1988.

After its closure, the college campus was bought by Maruzen Construction Company of Japan in 1990. In 1992, Maruzen opened an aviation college similar to the later years of Hawthorne College, but this institution was short-lived. The former college was then was owned by a Maharishi meditation school. In 2014, it was purchased by the nonprofit Overseas United Education, which opened a Christian preparatory school called the Hawthorne Academy in the fall of 2017.

The college's former airfield is now the Hawthorne–Feather Airpark, a privately owned public-use airport.

== Campus ==
The college was located on the former Flint Estate in North Branch, Antrim, New Hampshire. It also included an airport near Atrium. The campus consisted of 900 acres (360 ha) that overlooked the North Bridge River. The campus expanded to include properties in three towns, twenty buildings, and a 50 acres (20 ha) airfield with a 3,500 feet (1,100 m) runway.

In 1984, the surviving historic buildings of the Flint Estate were listed on the National Register of Historic Places.

== Academics ==
Hawthorne College offered a B.A. and B.S. in a dozen areas of concentration, an A.S. two-yeard degree, a secreterial management assistant program, professional pilot training, and aviation administration.

== Student life ==
The student yearbook was Janus. The college had a chapter of Kappa Sigma fraternity from 1975 to 1982. It also had a chapter of Alpha Eta Rho, a professional aviation fraternity. The college's marching band included bagpipes and highland dancers.

== Athletics ==
The Hawthorne College mascot was the Highlander. Its colors were green, white, and gold. In 1971, the college was a founding member of the Mayflower Conference. From 1984 to 1988, the college was a member of the ECAC Northeast, an intercollegiate athletic conference affiliated with the NCAA's Division III. Prior to that, it belonged to the National Association of Intercollegiate Athletics and the New England Intercollegiate Association.

The college had both a men's and women's basketball team. It also had baseball, men's lacrosse, men's soccer, skiing, and cross country teams. Its ice hockey team played in the 1983 NAIA Ice Hockey Championship semifinals. The college played NCAA Division III hockey from 1984 to 1988.

== Notable people ==
=== Alumni ===
- G. M. Ford, novelist
- Robert E. Raiche, New Hampshire House of Representatives

=== Faculty ===
- Ronald C. Arkin, computer science department chair known as a roboticist and roboethicist
- David Arseneault, athletic director and women's basketball coach
- Baldwin Domingo, military aviation history professor; later served in the New Hampshire House of Representatives
- John B. Harwood, professor, later served in the Rhode Island House of Representatives
- Charles W. Thomas, professor of science, a rank of rear admiral in the U.S. Coast Guard

== See also ==
- List of colleges and universities in New Hampshire
- List of NCAA ice hockey programs
