= ECAC Northeast =

College athletic conference

Eastern College Athletic Conference - Northeast
- Conference: NCAA
- Founded: 1971
- Ceased: 2016
- Commissioner: Rudy Keeling
- Sports fielded: Ice hockey
- Division: Division III
- No. of teams: 9 (final season)
- Headquarters: Centerville, Massachusetts
- Region: Massachusetts and Rhode Island

Locations

The ECAC Northeast was an intercollegiate athletic conference affiliated with the NCAA's Division III as a hockey-only conference. For many years it was one of the three men's hockey conferences that operated under the umbrella of the Eastern College Athletic Conference; the others were the ECAC East (now the New England Hockey Conference), and the ECAC West (soon to be the United Collegiate Hockey Conference). Member institutions were located in the New England region of the United States, in the states of Massachusetts and Rhode Island.

Unlike the ECAC East and ECAC West, there was no women's division of the ECAC Northeast. Most ECAC Northeast schools did not sponsor women's ice hockey; the two that did (Nichols & Salve Regina) played in the ECAC East.

The ECAC Northeast dissolved in 2016 when The Commonwealth Coast Conference, a Division III all-sports conference and the primary conference of most ECAC Northeast members, decided to sponsor men's ice hockey as a varsity sport. Becker, Johnson and Wales, and Suffolk joined the CCC as associate members for ice hockey, while CCC member University of New England moved their men's team from the ECAC East to play in the CCC league.

== History ==
The foundation of the ECAC Northeast was laid in 1971 when ECAC 2, the college division of the ECAC created a third conference called ECAC 3. When the NCAA created Division III in 1973 ECAC 3 was placed at that level and remained there for the rest of its existence. In 1985, as a result of the NCAA beginning a Division III Tournament, ECAC 2 was reorganized into two separate conferences, ECAC East and ECAC West, with each becoming D-III leagues. To prevent confusion, ECAC 3 was renamed as ECAC North/South with all members split into North and South divisions (similar to how ECAC 2 had been divided into East and West divisions). This arrangement continued until 1992 when ECAC North/South was rearranged into three divisions (North, South and Central) and renamed ECAC North/South/Central. Over the course of the 1997–98 season the South Division lost 6 of its 8 teams, mostly to Division I, but rather than return to a two-division arrangement the league rebranded as ECAC Northeast. A year later the four member schools who were from Division II schools began playing in a separate tournament which allowed the other programs to play in an NCAA-sanctioned D-III conference tournament for the first time. As a result, ECAC Northeast got its first automatic bid to the tournament in 2000. In 2009 the nine schools whose primary conference was either MASCAC or Northeast-10 left when those two leagues began sponsoring ice hockey. The remaining teams stayed on for another seven years but in 2016 the Commonwealth Coast Conference, the primary conference for seven of the nine member teams, began sponsoring ice hockey. All nine teams joined CCC as either full or associate members and the ECAC Northeast was dissolved.

== ECAC Northeast Tournament ==
Upon its founding, ECAC 3 instituted a tournament. Originally only a single game the championship slowly expanded along with the league.

== Members ==
There were nine member schools as of the conference's final season in 2015–16.

	Location	Athletic nickname	Colors	Founded	Joined	Left	Current Conference^{†}
Amherst College	Amherst, Massachusetts	Lord Jeffs (Note: Amherst's original, unofficial nickname for its teams, the Lord Jeffs, was retired in 2016 due to controversy over the propriety of honoring Lord Jeffrey Amherst.)		1821	1972	1992	NESCAC
Assumption College	Worcester, Massachusetts	Greyhounds		1904	1973	2009	Northeast–10
Becker College	Worcester, Massachusetts	Hawks		1784	2006	2016	CCC
Bentley University	Waltham, Massachusetts	Falcons		1917	1977	1998	Atlantic Hockey
Bryant College	Smithfield, Rhode Island	Bulldogs		1863	1973	1975	Dropped Program
Canisius College	Buffalo, New York	Golden Griffins		1870	1980	1982	Atlantic Hockey
Clark University	Worcester, Massachusetts	Cougars		1887	1978	1981	Dropped Program
Connecticut College	New London, Connecticut	Camels		1794	1980	1991	NESCAC
Curry College	Milton, Massachusetts	Colonels		1879	1983	2016	CCC
Endicott College	Beverly, Massachusetts	Gulls		1939	2015	2016	CCC
Fairfield University	Fairfield, Connecticut	Stags		1942	1974	1998	Dropped Program
Fitchburg State University	Fitchburg, Massachusetts	Falcons		1894	1975	2009	MASCAC
Framingham State University	Framingham, Massachusetts	Rams		1839	1972	2009 (Note: Framingham State played in ECAC 2 from 1979 thru 1982.)	MASCAC
Franklin Pierce University (Note: Franklin Pierce was known as 'Franklin Pierce College' until 2007.)	Rindge, New Hampshire	Ravens		1962	2002	2009	Northeast–10
Gordon College	Wenham, Massachusetts	Fighting Scots		1889	1974	1981	Dropped Program
Hawthorne College	Antrim, New Hampshire	Hilanders		1962	1984	1988	College Closed
Hobart College	Geneva, New York	Statesmen		1822	1978	1983	NEHC
Iona College	New Rochelle, New York	Gaels		1940	1977	1998	Dropped Program
Johnson & Wales University	Providence, Rhode Island	Wildcats		1914	1997	2016	NEHC
Keene State College	Keene, New Hampshire	Owls		1909	1983	1986	Dropped Program
Lebanon Valley College	Annville, Pennsylvania	Flying Dutchmen		1866	1998	2004	UCHC
Lehigh University	Bethlehem, Pennsylvania	Mountain Hawks		1865	1971	1986	Dropped Program
University of Massachusetts Boston	Dorchester, Massachusetts	Beacons		1964	1980	1982	NEHC
University of Massachusetts Dartmouth (Note: Massachusetts Dartmouth was known as Southeastern Massachusetts University until 1991.)	Dartmouth, Massachusetts	Corsairs		1895	1974	2009	MASCAC
Massachusetts Institute of Technology	Cambridge, Massachusetts	Engineers		1861	1971	1975	Dropped Program
Massachusetts Maritime Academy	Buzzards Bay, Massachusetts	Buccaneers		1891	1975	1978	Dropped Program
Nasson College	Springvale, Maine	Lions		1914	1972	1974	College Closed
City College of New York	New York, New York	Beavers		1847	1976	1977	Dropped Program
Nichols College	Dudley, Massachusetts	Bison		1914	1971	2016	CCC
North Adams State College	North Adams, Massachusetts	Mowhawks		1894	1971	1975	Dropped Program
Plymouth State University	Plymouth, New Hampshire	Panthers		1871	1973	2009	MASCAC
Queens College	New York, New York	Knights		1847	1976	1980	Dropped Program
Quinnipiac University	Hamden, Connecticut	Braves		1929	1976	1998	ECAC Hockey
Ramapo College	Mahwah, New Jersey	Roadrunners		1969	1976	1981	Dropped Program
Rochester Institute of Technology	Henrietta, New York	Tigers		1829	1972	1980	Atlantic Hockey
Roger Williams University	Bristol, Rhode Island	Hawks		1956	1983	1998	Dropped Program
Sacred Heart University	Fairfield, Connecticut	Pioneers		1963	1993	1998	Atlantic Hockey
Saint Michael's College	Colchester, Vermont	Purple Knights		1904	1982	2001	Northeast–10
Salve Regina University	Newport, Rhode Island	Seahawks		1934	1997	2016	CCC
University of Scranton	Scranton, Pennsylvania	Royals		1888	1985	1991	Dropped Program
Skidmore College	Saratoga Springs, New York	Thoroughbreds		1903	1983	1998	NEHC
University of Southern Maine	Gorham, Maine	Huskies		1878	1972	1995 (Note: Southern Maine Suspended its program from 1975 thru 1985 and changed its name from University of Maine at Portland-Gorham in the interim.)	NEHC
Southern New Hampshire University (Note: Southern New Hampshire was known as New Hampshire College until 2001.)	Manchester, New Hampshire	Penmen		1932	1977	2009	Northeast–10
St. John's University	New York, New York	Red Storm		1870	1980	1992	Dropped Program
Stonehill College	Easton, Massachusetts	Skyhawks		1948	1978	2009	Independent
Suffolk University	Boston, Massachusetts	Rams		1934	1980	2016	NEHC
Trinity College	Hartford, Connecticut	Bantams		1823	1974	1991	NESCAC
Tufts University	Medford, Massachusetts	Jumbos		1852	1986	2001	NESCAC
Upsala College	East Orange, New Jersey	Vikings		1893	1979	1988	College Closed
Villanova University	Radnor Township, Pennsylvania	Wildcats		1842	1982	1998	Dropped Program
Wentworth Institute of Technology	Boston, Massachusetts	Leopards		1904	1992	2016	CCC
Wesleyan University	Middletown, Connecticut	Cardinals		1831	1971	1995	NESCAC
Western New England University	Springfield, Massachusetts	Golden Bears		1919	1980	2016	CCC
Westfield State University	Westfield, Massachusetts	Owls		1874	1974	1978 (Note: Westfield State returned to ECAC Northeast for 1 season in 2008–09.)	MASCAC
Worcester State University	Worcester, Massachusetts	Lancers		1874	1971	2009	MASCAC

† as of 2018

* Assumption, Franklin Pierce, Southern New Hampshire, and Stonehill are Division II schools; and were not allowed to participate in the ECAC Northeast playoffs after 1999, nor were they eligible for the Division III national tournament.
