= Brockport Golden Eagles =

- University: SUNY Brockport
- Conference: Empire 8
- NCAA: Division III (primary); Division I (women's gymnastics)
- Athletic director: Erick Hart
- Location: Brockport, New York
- Varsity teams: 21
- Football stadium: Eunice Kennedy Shriver Stadium
- Basketball arena: Jim and John Vlogianitis Gymnasium
- Baseball stadium: Clark V. Whited Complex
- Other venues: Tuttle North Ice Arena
- Mascot: Ellsworth
- Nickname: Golden Eagles
- Colors: Green and gold
- Website: gobrockport.com
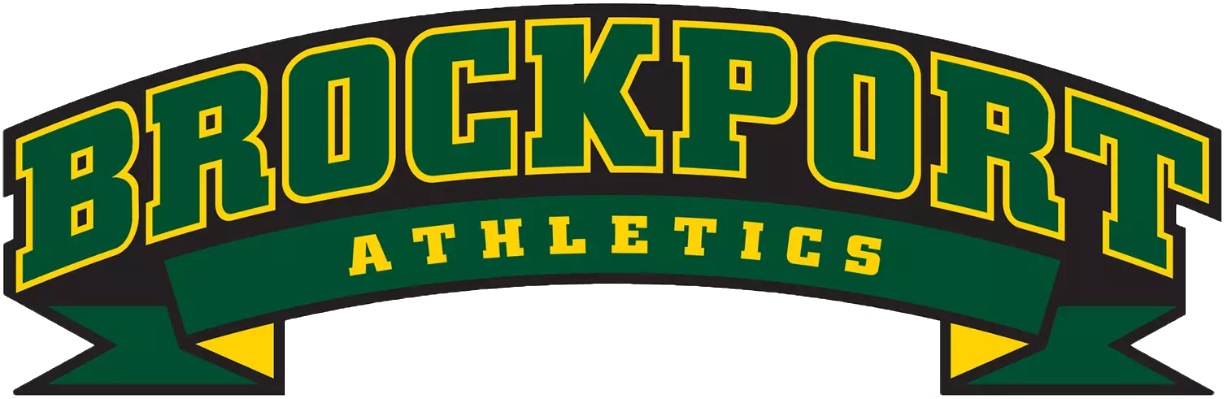

The Brockport Golden Eagles (also known as the SUNY Brockport Golden Eagles or the Brockport State Golden Eagles) are composed of 23 teams representing the SUNY Brockport in intercollegiate athletics, including men and women's basketball, cross country, lacrosse, soccer, swimming & diving, and track and field. Men's sports include baseball, football, ice hockey, and wrestling. Women's sports include field hockey, gymnastics, volleyball, tennis, and softball. The Golden Eagles compete in NCAA Division III (except for gymnastics, which competes in NCAA Division I) and are members of the Empire 8 Conference. Before Fall 2024, they, except football, which has been competing in the Empire 8 since Fall 2014, were members of the State University of New York Athletic Conference.

== Teams ==
Men's sports	Women's sports
Baseball	Basketball
Basketball	Cross Country
Cross Country	Field Hockey
Football	Flag Football
Ice Hockey	Gymnastics
Lacrosse	Lacrosse
Soccer	Soccer
Swimming & Diving	Softball
Track and Field	Swimming & Diving
Wrestling	Tennis
	Track and Field
	Volleyball

== Baseball ==
Brockport has had 1 Major League Baseball draft selection since the draft began in 1965.

Golden Eagles in the Major League Baseball Draft
Year	Player	Round	Team
1976	Brian Meyl	13	Athletics

== Basketball ==
Al Walker, now a pro personnel scout for the NBA's Detroit Pistons and formerly a college coach, played from 1978-81 for the Brockport Golden Eagles. He earned honorable mention on the Small College All-American team. At Brockport, in 2012 he ranked fifth all-time in rebounds (706; 2nd at the time of his graduation) and 20th in scoring (856), while playing only three seasons.
