= Saint Mary's University of Minnesota =

Catholic university in Winona, Minnesota, US

- Former name: Saint Mary's College (1912–1995)
- Motto: Virtus et Scientia
- Motto in English: Virtue and Knowledge
- Type: Private university
- Established: 1912; 114 years ago
- Religious affiliation: Roman Catholic (Lasallian)
- Academic affiliations: IALU, ACCU, CIC, NAICU
- President: James P. Burns
- Students: 3,656 (fall 2024)
- Undergraduates: 1,083 (fall 2024)
- Postgraduates: 2,573 (fall 2024)
- Location: Winona and Minneapolis, Minnesota, U.S. 44°02′41″N 91°41′46″W
- Colors: Navy & red
- Nickname: Cardinals
- Sporting affiliations: NCAA Division III – MIAC
- Mascot: Cardinal
- Website: smumn.edu
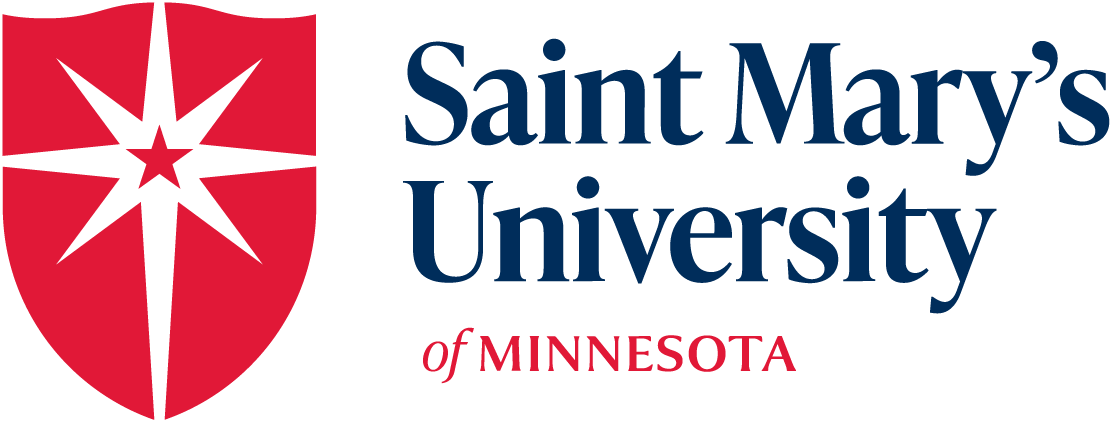

The Saint Mary's University of Minnesota (SMUMN) is a private Lasallian university with its primary campuses in Winona and Minneapolis, Minnesota, United States. It comprises an undergraduate residential college in Winona; graduate and professional programs in Winona, the Twin Cities, and Rochester; and additional teaching locations in Minnesota and Wisconsin as well as Jamaica. The institution was founded in 1912 and is associated with the Institute of the Brothers of the Christian Schools, also known as the De La Salle Brothers.

== History ==
Bishop Patrick Richard Heffron founded "Saint Mary's College" in 1912, a men's college operated by the Winona Diocese. Heffron Hall, a residential hall was built in 1920, and named after Bishop Heffron. By 1925 it became a four-year liberal arts college. In 1933, it was taken over by the De La Salle Christian Brothers, a religious order whose main charism is teaching. It became a co-educational university in 1969 and later purchased the campus and buildings of the former College of Saint Teresa, a women's college in Winona that ceased operations in 1989. In recent years, portions of the Saint Teresa campus were sold to Winona State University and Winona Cotter High School.

During the 1980s the main Winona campus underwent vigorous growth. Constructed during this decade were the Ice Arena (1986), Performance Center, including Figliulo Recital Hall and Joseph Page Theatre (1987), Brother Charles Hall science addition (1987), Gilmore Creek Residence (1989), and Christian Brothers Residence (1989). More recent additions include McEnery Center (1993), Gostomski Fieldhouse and Jul Gernes Pool (1994), pedestrian plaza (1994), Pines Hall residence (1995), Hendrickson Center (1996), The Heights (1997), Oscar and Mary Jane Straub Clocktower and Court (1999), Hillside Hall residence (2001), ice arena addition (2004) a soccer field / track complex in 2008, Brother Leopold Hall (2012, which includes an outdoor recreation center donated by the Winona ski club), and the new freshmen residence hall Brother William completed in 2019. During the summer of 2021, the old Adducci science building was renovated and renamed Aquinas Hall, which includes a new facility for the University's nursing program.

Beginning in 1985, then-president Louis DeThomasis launched a series of new, non-traditional graduate and professional programs. The Schools of Graduate and Professional Programs, using a variety of course delivery methods and locations, is now one of Minnesota's largest graduate schools. SGPP programs are delivered at the Twin Cities campus, Rochester center, Apple Valley center, Minnetonka center, Oakdale center, and at locations around Minnesota and Wisconsin. The university has a partnership with Catholic College of Mandeville, Jamaica. In 2011, the Twin Cities campus added Harrington Mansion and Saint Mary's Event Center to its expanding facilities on Park Avenue in Minneapolis.

In 1995, Saint Mary's College was renamed Saint Mary's University of Minnesota to reflect the expanded role of graduate and professional programming, and to distinguish Saint Mary's from schools with similar names.

=== Presidents ===
Years	President
Founder	Patrick R. Heffron
1912–1918	William E.F. Griffin
1918–1933	John H. Peschges
1933–1942	Leopold Julian Dodd
1942–1943	Landrick Jerome Fox
1943–1950	Joel Stanislaus Nelson
1950–1956	J. Ambrose Groble
1956–1963	Basil Rothweiler
1963–1969	Josephus Gregory Robertson
1969–1976	George Pahl
1976–1984	Peter Clifford
1984–2005	Louis DeThomasis
2005–2006	Craig J. Franz
2006–2008	Louis DeThomasis
2008–2018	William Mann
2018–Present	James P. Burns

== Academics ==
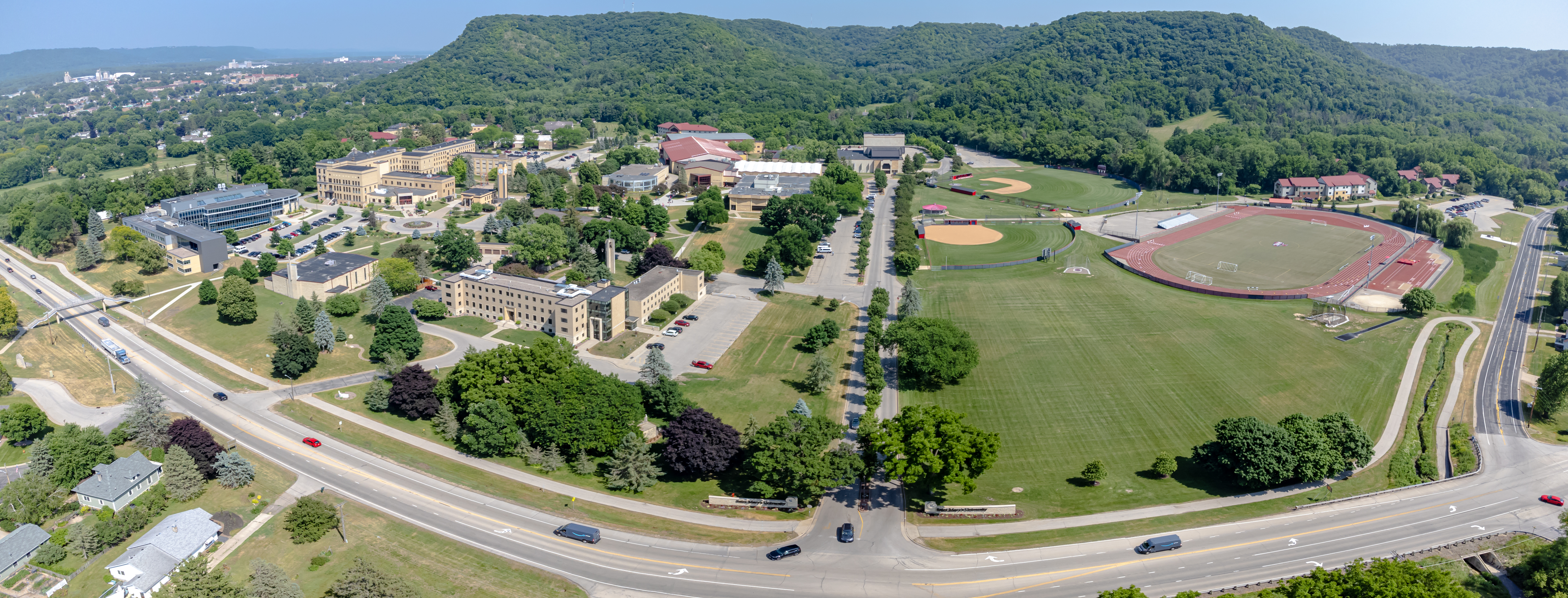
Saint Mary's University of Winona

Saint Mary's University offers a wide range of degrees. The university offers bachelor's, master's, and doctorate degrees for both traditional and non-traditional students. In addition to the degrees, Saint Mary's also offers teaching licensures, certifications, and pre-professional programs. Both undergraduate and graduate programs offer online learning. Men study for the priesthood at the adjacent Immaculate Heart of Mary Seminary, owned and operated by the Diocese of Winona.

=== Changes in 2022 ===
Due to financial difficulties and low undergraduate enrollment, in May 2022, the university announced plans to phase out 11 majors including English, history, theatre, music, art, and theology. The president of the university, James P. Burns, said about the decision, "In particular, what we looked at is the majors that we are phasing out are those that really were low enrolled and also didn't hold great promise in terms of what many families and students want, which is marketable skills and jobs after college."

== Athletics ==
Saint Mary's athletics wordmark

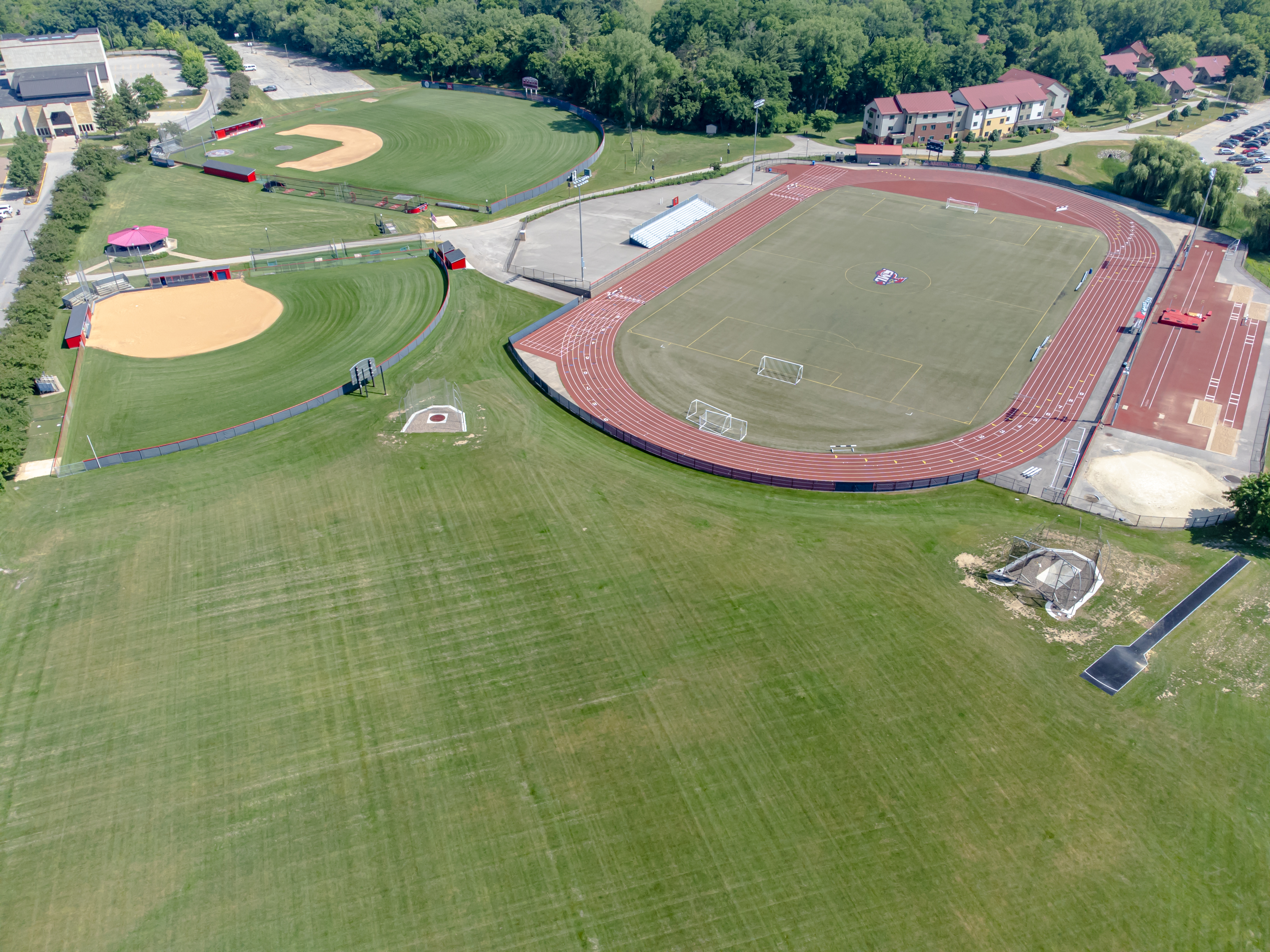
Saint Mary's University athletic fields

The university's sports teams are nicknamed the Cardinals (previously the Redmen until 1988) and compete as a member of the Minnesota Intercollegiate Athletic Conference (MIAC). There are 21 NCAA Division III varsity sports teams at Saint Mary's. The Saint Mary's fastpitch softball team won the 2000 NCAA Division III National Title. That title was the university's first and so far only national team title. In 1955, the college administration elected to discontinue football as a sport at the university. A task force was formed in 2005 to study the feasibility of adding football, but the proposal was rejected in 2006 by a unanimous vote of the board of trustees.

There is an on-campus cross country ski and running trail in the bluffs and valleys of the 450-acre (180 ha) campus. Athletic facilities are being renovated and expanded. Upgrades were recently made to basketball, baseball and softball. A challenging disc golf course was installed in the bluffs and valleys around campus in 2007. An outdoor track and soccer complex, and a high-and-low ropes course, were added in 2008.

Saint Mary's has long had a friendly crosstown rivalry in non-conference athletics with NCAA Division II member Winona State University.

== Notable alumni ==
- Anthony Adducci, pioneer of the medical device industry in Minnesota; is best known for co-founding Guidant, the company that manufactured the world's first lithium battery powered artificial pacemaker
- Michael Anthony Bilandic, former mayor of Chicago and chief justice of the Illinois Supreme Court
- Frank Billock, NFL player
- Bernard Carey, politician who served as Cook County state's attorney and a judge on the Circuit Court of Cook County
- Fritz Cronin, NFL player
- Sean Duffy, 20th United States Secretary of Transportation, former congressman from Wisconsin's 7th congressional district
- Mike Johanns, former secretary of agriculture of the United States, former governor of Nebraska, former United States senator
- George Kenning, business consultant
- Mike Leaf, college basketball coach
- John McDonough, hockey executive
- James Miller, member of the Brothers of the Christian Schools and murder victim
- Donald G. Truhlar, chemistry professor
- Jerome J. Workman, Jr., prolific author and editor of scientific reference works on the subject of spectroscopy
- Tom Younghans, National Hockey League player

== See also ==
- Lasallian Educational Institutions
- Immaculate Heart of Mary Seminary
- List of colleges and universities in Minnesota
- Higher education in Minnesota
