= George Kenning =

George Kenning may refer to:

- George Kenning (business consultant), American
- George Kenning (entrepreneur), English
