= Garden =

Planned space for displaying plants and other forms of nature

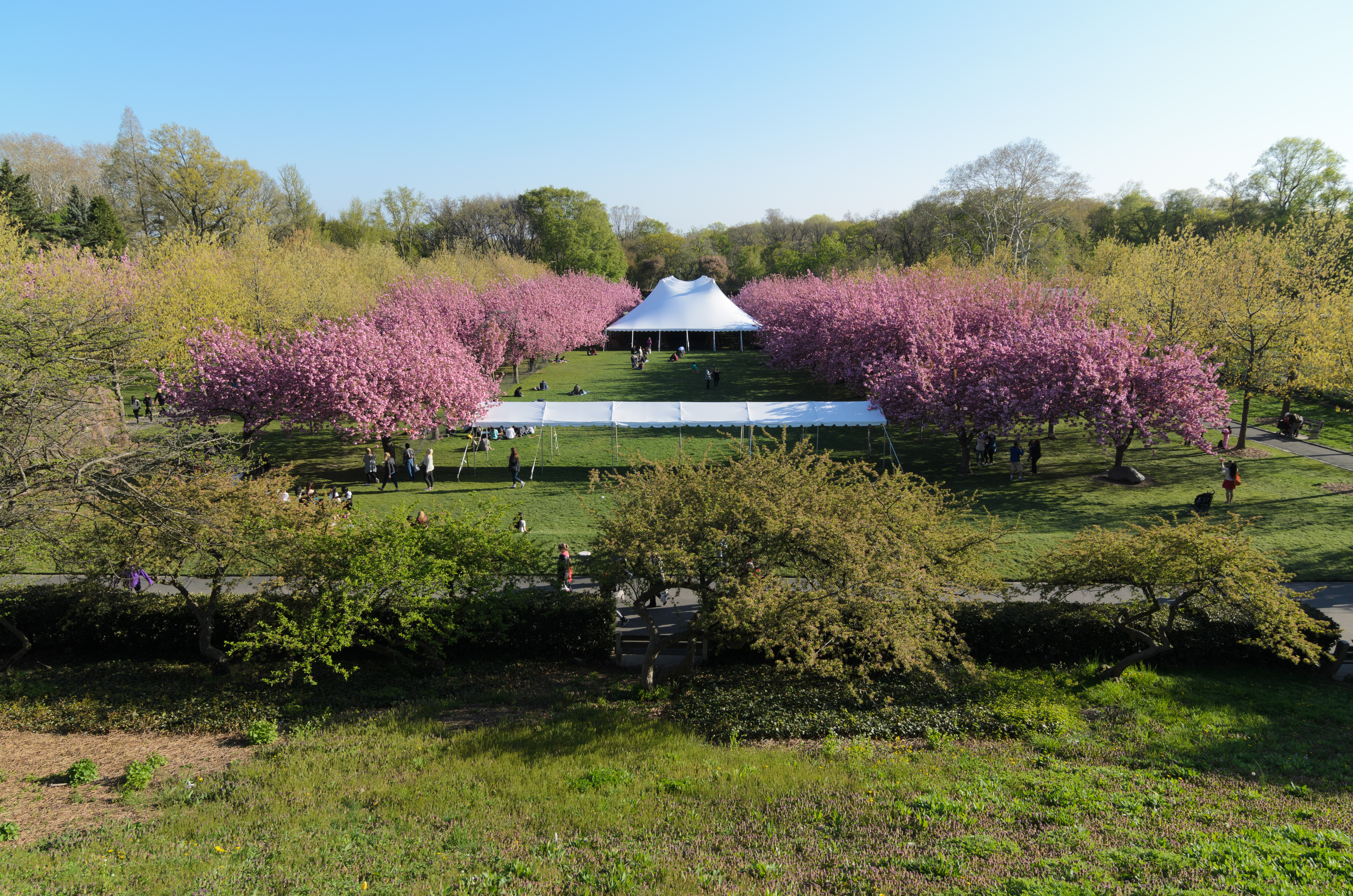
A section of the Brooklyn Botanic Garden that has pink Prunus 'Kanzan' cherry trees

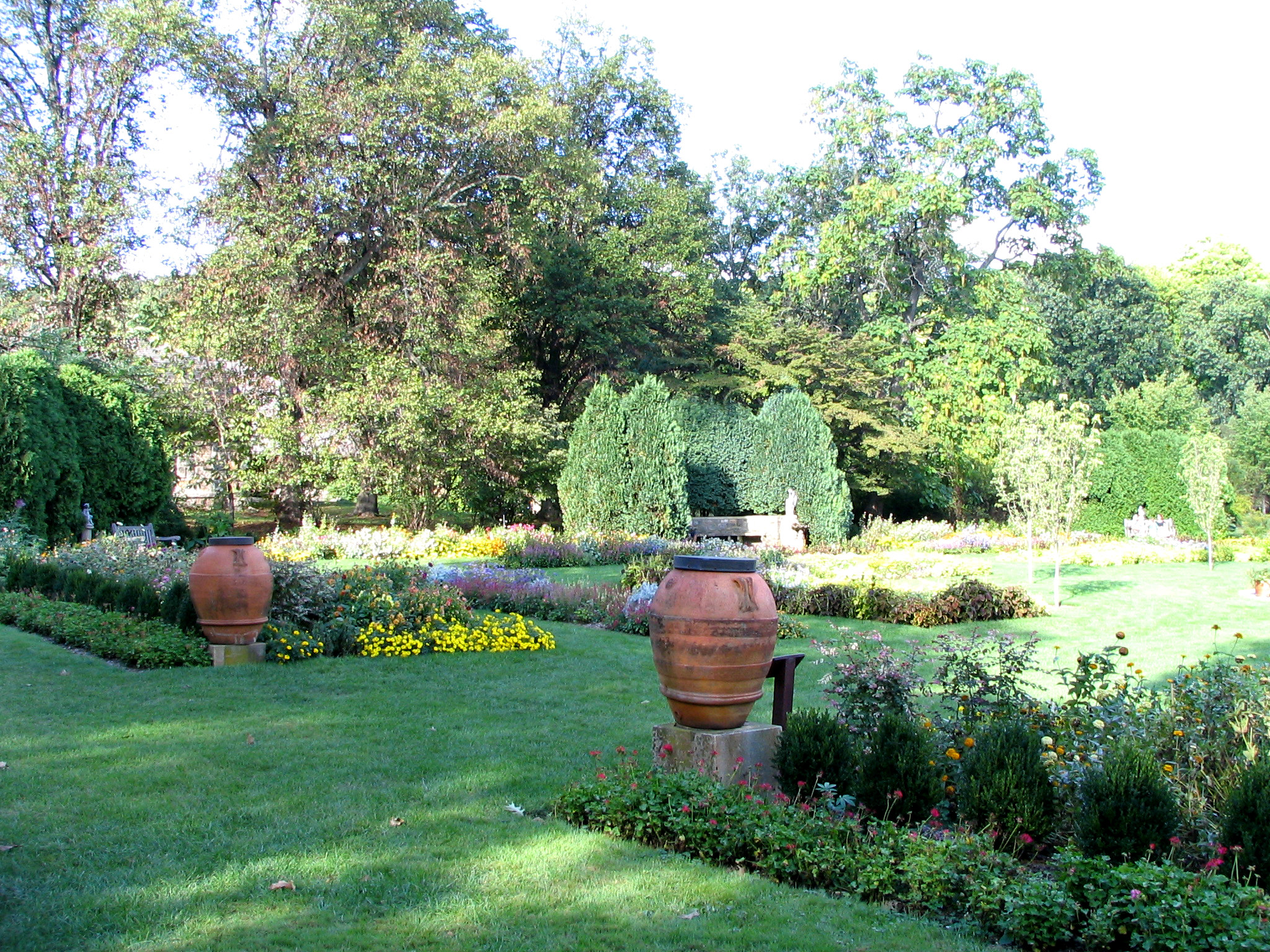
The New Jersey Botanical Garden at Skylands Estate

A garden is a planned space, usually outdoors, set aside for the cultivation, display, and enjoyment of plants and other forms of nature. The single feature identifying even the wildest wild garden is control. The garden can incorporate both natural and artificial materials.

Gardens often have design features including statuary, follies, pergolas, trellises, stumperies, dry creek beds, and water features such as fountains, ponds (with or without fish), waterfalls or creeks. Some gardens are for ornamental purposes only, while others also produce food crops, sometimes in separate areas, or sometimes intermixed with the ornamental plants. Food-producing gardens are distinguished from farms by their smaller scale, more labor-intensive methods, and their purpose (enjoyment of a pastime or self-sustenance rather than producing for sale, as in a market garden). Flower gardens combine plants of different heights, colors, textures, and fragrances to create interest and delight the senses.

The most common form today is a residential or public garden, but the term garden has traditionally been a more general one. Zoos, which display wild animals in simulated natural habitats, were formerly called zoological gardens. Western gardens are almost universally based on plants, with garden, which etymologically implies enclosure, often signifying a shortened form of botanical garden. Some traditional types of eastern gardens, such as Zen gardens, however, use plants sparsely or not at all. Landscape gardens, on the other hand, such as the English landscape gardens first developed in the 18th century, may decide to omit flowers altogether.

Landscape architecture is a related professional activity with landscape architects tending to engage in design at many scales and working on both public and private projects.

== Etymology ==
The etymology of the word gardening refers to enclosure: it is from Middle English gardin, from Anglo-French gardin, jardin, of Germanic origin; akin to Old High German gard, gart, an enclosure or compound, as in Stuttgart. See Grad (Slavic settlement) for more complete etymology. The words yard, court, and Latin hortus (meaning "garden", hence horticulture and orchard), are cognates—all referring to a defined enclosed space.

The term "garden" in British English refers to a small enclosed area of land, usually adjoining a building. This would be referred to as a yard in American English.

== Uses ==
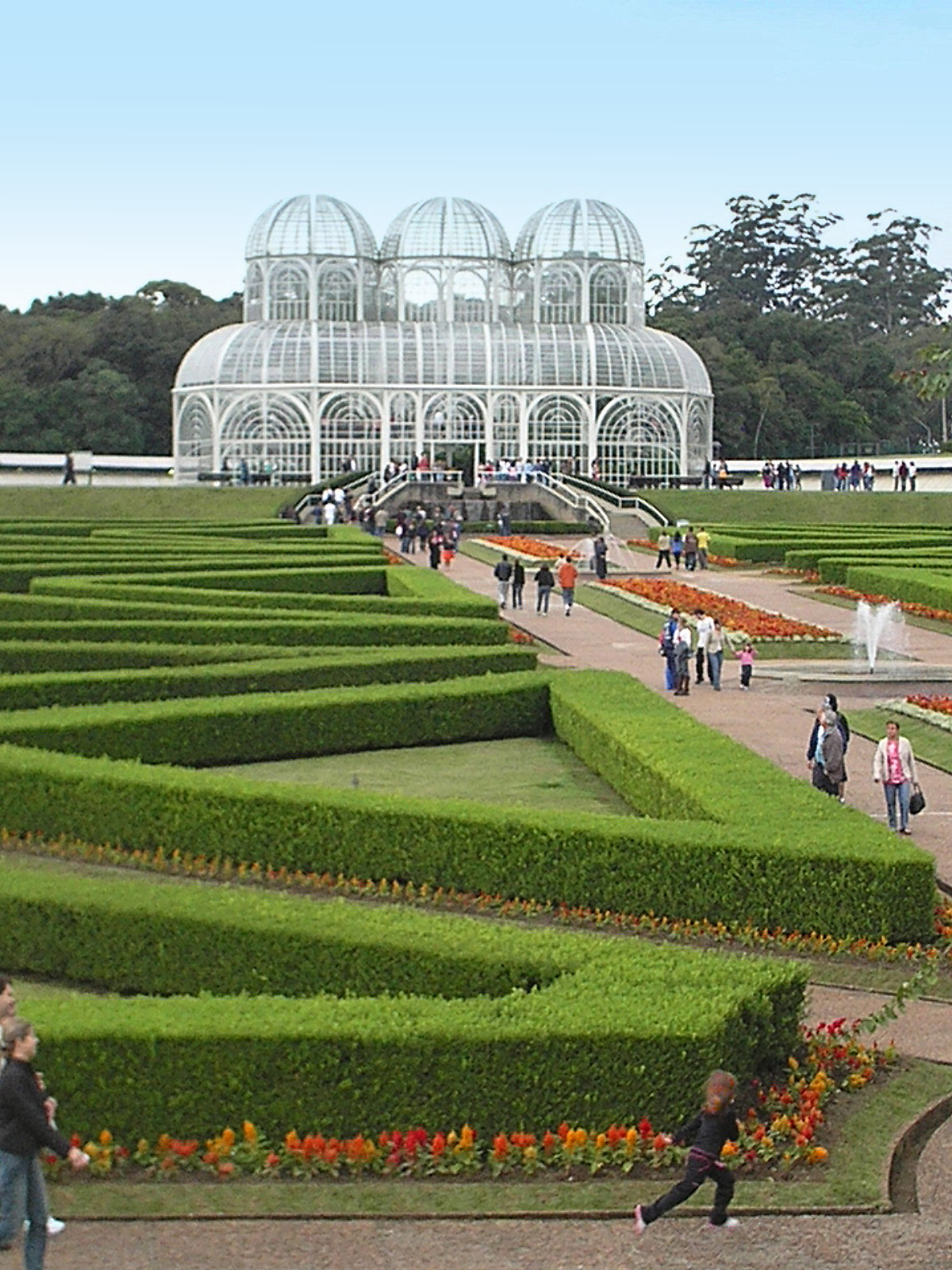
Partial view from the Botanical Garden of Curitiba (Southern Brazil): parterres, flowers, fountains, sculptures, greenhouses and tracks composes the place used for recreation and to study and protect the flora.

A garden can have aesthetic, functional, and recreational uses:

- Cooperation with nature
  - Plant cultivation
  - Garden-based learning
- Observation of nature
  - Bird- and insect-watching
  - Reflection on the changing seasons
- Relaxation
  - Placing down different types of garden gnomes
  - Family dinners on the terrace
  - Children playing in the garden
  - Reading and relaxing in a hammock
  - Maintaining the flowerbeds
  - Pottering in the shed
  - Basking in warm sunshine
  - Escaping oppressive heat
- Growing useful produce
  - Flowers to cut and bring inside for indoor beauty
  - Fresh herbs and vegetables for cooking

== History ==
=== Asia ===
==== China ====
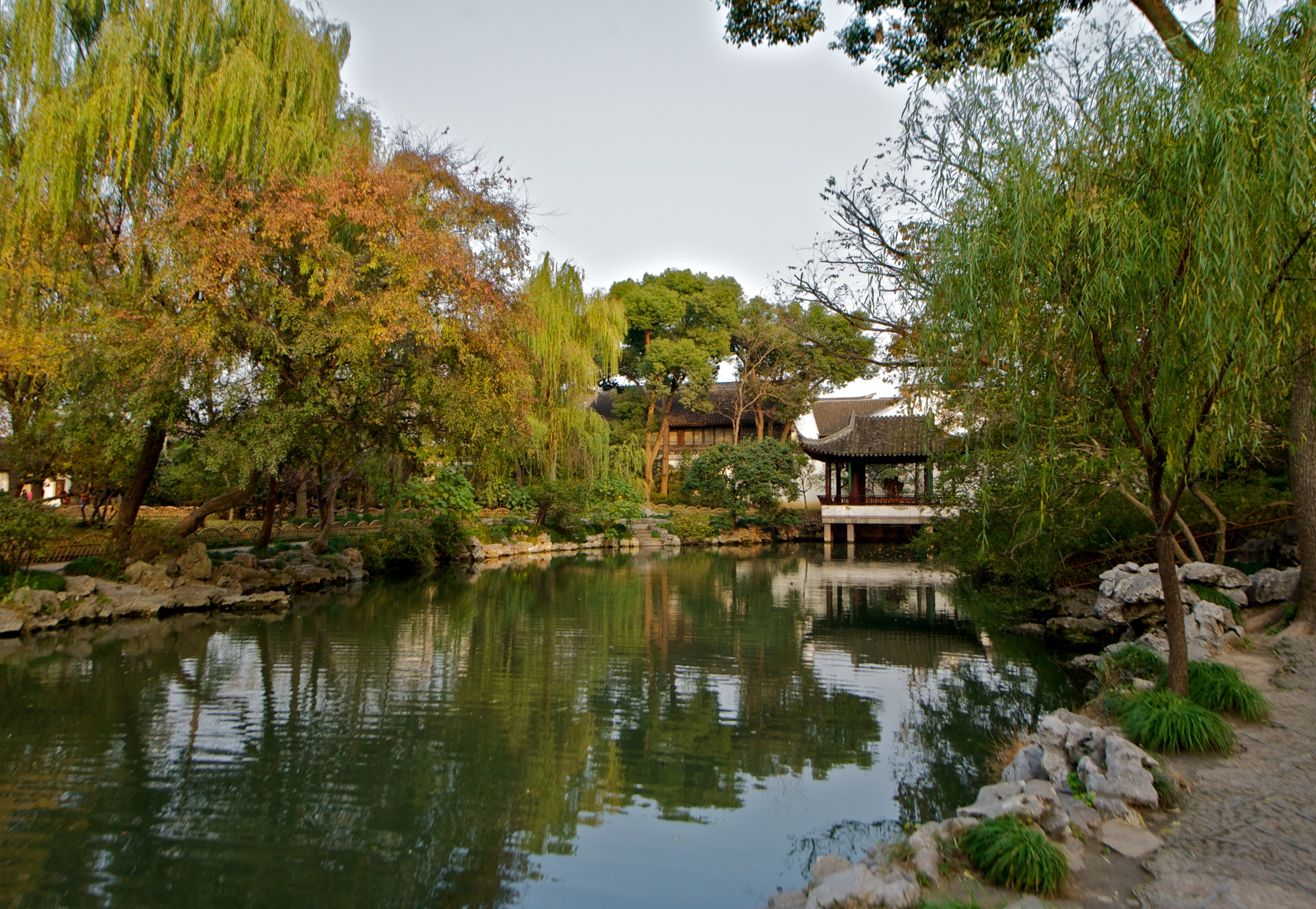
Naturalistic design of a Chinese garden incorporated into the landscape, including a pavilion

The earliest recorded Chinese gardens were created in the valley of the Yellow River, during the Shang dynasty (1600–1046 BC). These gardens were large, enclosed parks where the kings and nobles hunted game, or where fruit and vegetables were grown. Early inscriptions from this period, carved on tortoise shells, have three Chinese characters for garden, yòu (囿), pǔ (圃) and yuán (園). Yòu was a royal garden where birds and animals were kept, while pǔ was a garden for plants. During the Qin dynasty (221–206 BC), yuán became the character for all gardens. The old character for yuán is a small picture of a garden; it is enclosed in a square which can represent a wall, and has symbols which can represent the plan of a structure, a small square which can represent a pond, and a symbol for a plantation or a pomegranate tree.

A famous royal garden of the late Shang dynasty was the Terrace, Pond and Park of the Spirit (Lingtai, Lingzhao Lingyou) built by King Wenwang west of his capital city, Yin. The park was described in the Classic of Poetry this way:

The King was in the Sacred Park,
Where does the mother deer lie at ease?
The deer are sleek and bright,
The cranes shine with purest white.
The King makes his promenade to the Pond of the Spirit,
Where fish leap full to every part.

Another early royal garden was Shaqui, or the Dunes of Sand, built by the last Shang ruler, King Zhou (1675–1029 BC). It was composed of an earth terrace, or tai, which served as an observation platform in the center of a large square park. It was described in one of the early classics of Chinese literature, the Records of the Grand Historian (Shiji). According to the Shiji, one of the most famous features of this garden was the Wine Pool and Meat Forest (酒池肉林). A large pool, big enough for several small boats, was constructed on the palace grounds, with inner linings of polished oval shaped stones from the seashore. The pool was then subsequently filled with wine. A small island was constructed in the middle of the pool, where trees were planted, which had skewers of roasted meat hanging from their branches. King Zhou and his friends and concubines drifted in their boats, drinking the wine with their hands and eating the roasted meat from the trees. Later Chinese philosophers and historians cited this garden as an example of decadence and bad taste.

During the Spring and Autumn period (722–481 BC), in 535 BC, the Terrace of Shanghua, with lavishly decorated palaces, was built by King Jing of the Zhou dynasty. In 505 BC, an even more elaborate garden, the Terrace of Gusu, was begun. It was located on the side of a mountain, and included a series of terraces connected by galleries, along with a lake where boats in the form of blue dragons navigated. From the highest terrace, a view extended as far as Lake Tai, the Great Lake.

==== India ====
Manasollasa is a twelfth century Sanskrit text that offers details on garden design and a variety of other subjects. Both public parks and woodland gardens are described, with about 40 types of trees recommended for the park in the Vana-krida chapter. Shilparatna, a text from the sixteenth century, states that flower gardens or public parks should be located in the northern portion of a town.

==== Japan ====
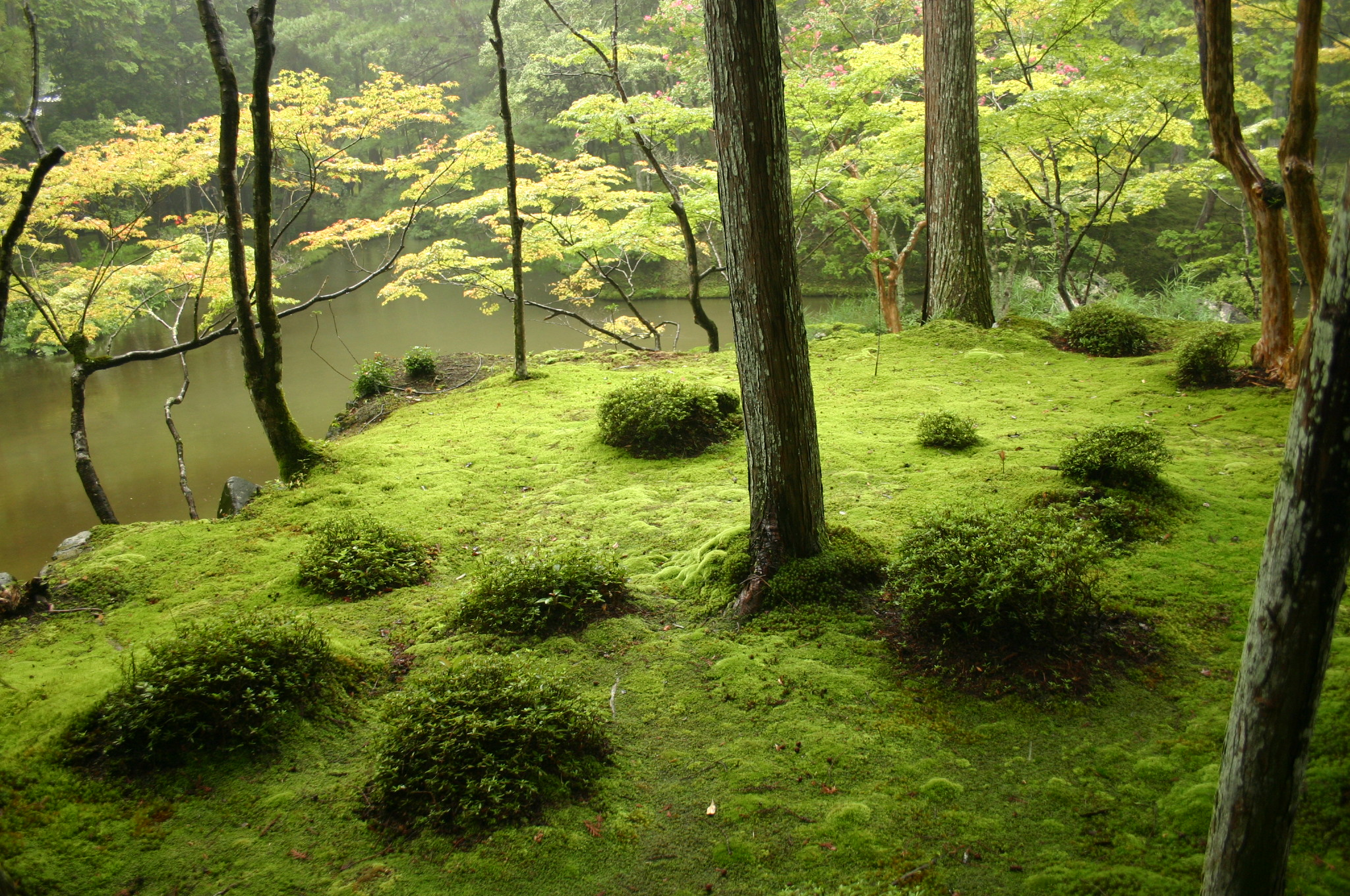
A moss garden at the Saihō-ji temple in Kyoto, started in 1339.

The earliest recorded Japanese gardens were the pleasure gardens of the Emperors and nobles. They were mentioned in several brief passages of the Nihon Shoki, the first chronicle of Japanese history, published in 720 CE. In spring 74 CE, the chronicle recorded: "The Emperor Keikō put a few carp into a pond, and rejoiced to see them morning and evening". The following year, "The Emperor launched a double-hulled boat in the pond of Ijishi at Ihare, and went aboard with his imperial concubine, and they feasted sumptuously together". In 486, the chronicle recorded that "The Emperor Kenzō went into the garden and feasted at the edge of a winding stream".

==== Korea ====
Korean gardens are a type of garden described as being natural, informal, simple and unforced, seeking to merge with the natural world. They have a history that goes back more than two thousand years, but are little known in the west. The oldest records date to the Three Kingdoms period (57 BC – 668 AD) when architecture and palace gardens showed a development noted in the Korean History of the Three Kingdoms.

=== Europe ===
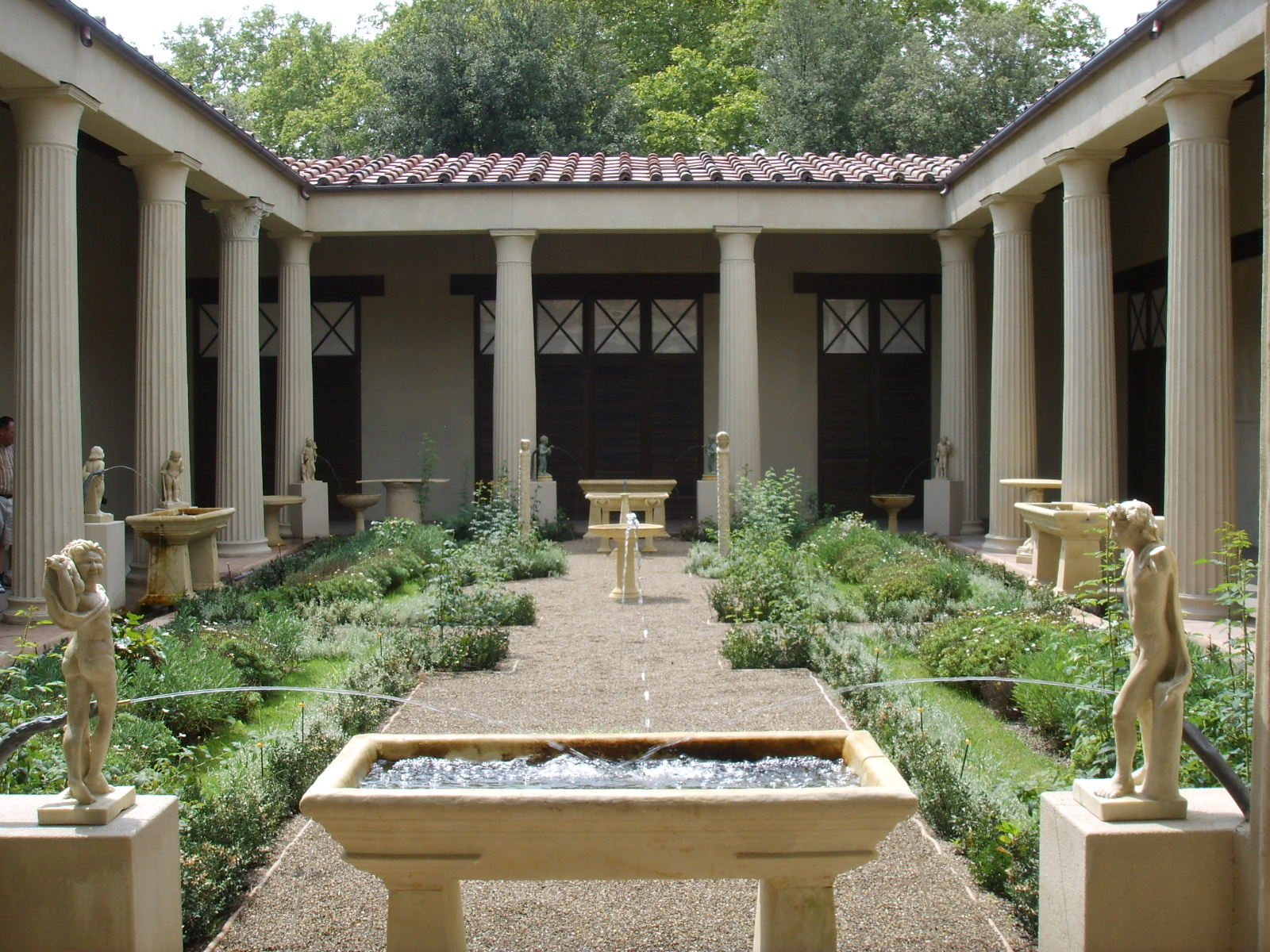
Reconstruction of the garden at the House of the Vettii in Pompeii.

Gardening was not recognized as an art form in Europe until the mid 16th century when it entered the political discourse, as a symbol of the concept of the "ideal republic". Evoking utopian imagery of the Garden of Eden, a time of abundance and plenty where humans didn't know hunger or the conflicts that arose from property disputes. John Evelyn wrote in the early 17th century, "there is not a more laborious life then is that of a good Gard'ners; but a labour full of tranquility and satisfaction; Natural and Instructive, and such as (if any) contributes to Piety and Contemplation." During the era of Enclosures, the agrarian collectivism of the feudal age was idealized in literary "fantasies of liberating regression to garden and wilderness".

==== France ====
Following his campaign in Italy in 1495, where he saw the gardens and castles of Naples, King Charles VIII brought Italian craftsmen and garden designers, such as Pacello da Mercogliano, from Naples and ordered the construction of Italian-style gardens at his residence at the Château d'Amboise and at Château Gaillard, another private résidence in Amboise. His successor Henry II, who had also travelled to Italy and had met Leonardo da Vinci, created an Italian garden nearby at the Château de Blois. Beginning in 1528, King Francis I created new gardens at the Château de Fontainebleau, which featured fountains, parterres, a forest of pine trees brought from Provence, and the first artificial grotto in France. The Château de Chenonceau had two gardens in the new style, one created for Diane de Poitiers in 1551, and a second for Catherine de' Medici in 1560. In 1536, the architect Philibert de l'Orme, upon his return from Rome, created the gardens of the Château d'Anet following the Italian rules of proportion. The carefully prepared harmony of Anet, with its parterres and surfaces of water integrated with sections of greenery, became one of the earliest and most influential examples of the classic French garden.

The French formal garden (French: jardin à la française) contrasted with the design principles of the English landscape garden (French: jardin à l'anglaise) namely, to "force nature" instead of leaving it undisturbed. Typical French formal gardens had "parterres, geometrical shapes and neatly clipped topiary", in contrast to the English style of garden in which "plants and shrubs seem to grow naturally without artifice." By the mid-17th century axial symmetry had ascended to prominence in the French gardening traditions of Andre Mollet and Jacques Boyceau, from which the latter wrote: "All things, however beautiful they may be chosen, will be defective if they are not ordered and placed in proper symmetry." A good example of the French formal style are the Tuileries gardens in Paris which were originally designed during the reign of King Henry II in the mid-sixteenth century. The gardens were redesigned into the formal French style for the Sun King Louis XIV. The gardens were ordered into symmetrical lines: long rows of elm or chestnut trees, clipped hedgerows, along with parterres, "reflect[ing] the orderly triumph of man's will over nature."

The French landscape garden was influenced by the English landscape garden and gained prominence in the late eighteenth century.

==== United Kingdom ====
Before the Grand Manner era, a few significant gardens were found in Britain which were developed under the influence of the continent. Britain's homegrown domestic gardening traditions were mostly practical in purpose, rather than aesthetic, unlike the grand Gardens found mostly on castle grounds and less commonly in universities. Tudor Gardens emphasized contrast rather than transitions, distinguished by color and illusion. They were not intended as a complement to home or architecture, but conceived as independent spaces, arranged to grow and display flowers and ornamental plants. Gardeners demonstrated their artistry in knot gardens, with complex arrangements most commonly included interwoven box hedges, and less commonly fragrant herbs like rosemary. Sanded paths run between the hedgings of open knots whereas closed knots were filled with single-colored flowers. The knot and parterre gardens were always placed on level ground, and elevated areas reserved for terraces from which the intricacy of the gardens could be viewed.

Jacobean gardens were described as "a delightful confusion" by Henry Wotton in 1624. Under the influence of the Italian Renaissance, Caroline gardens began to shed some of the chaos of earlier designs, marking the beginning of a trends towards symmetrical unified designs that took the building architecture into account, and featuring an elevated terrace from which home and garden could be viewed. The only surviving Caroline garden is located at Bolsover Castle in Derbyshire, but is too simple to attract much interest. During the reign of Charles II, many new Baroque style country houses were built; while in England Oliver Cromwell sought to destroy many Tudor, Jacobean and Caroline style Gardens.

== Design ==
Garden design is the process of creating plans for the layout and planting of gardens and landscapes. Gardens may be designed by garden owners themselves, or by professionals. Professional garden designers tend to be trained in principles of design and horticulture, and have a knowledge and experience of using plants. Some professional garden designers are also landscape architects, a more formal level of training that usually requires an advanced degree and often an occupational license.

Elements of garden design include the layout of hard landscape, such as paths, rockeries, walls, water features, sitting areas and decking, as well as the plants themselves, with consideration for their horticultural requirements, their season-to-season appearance, lifespan, growth habit, size, speed of growth, and combinations with other plants and landscape features. Most gardens consist of a mixture of natural and constructed elements, although even very 'natural' gardens are always an inherently artificial creation. Natural elements present in a garden principally comprise flora (such as trees and weeds), fauna (such as arthropods and birds), soil, water, air and light. Constructed elements include not only paths, patios, decking, sculptures, drainage systems, lights and buildings (such as sheds, gazebos, pergolas and follies), but also living constructions such as flower beds, ponds and lawns.

Garden needs of maintenance are also taken into consideration. Including the time or funds available for regular maintenance, (this can affect the choices of plants regarding speed of growth) spreading or self-seeding of the plants (annual or perennial), bloom-time, and many other characteristics. Garden design can be roughly divided into two groups, formal and naturalistic gardens. The most important consideration in any garden design is how the garden will be utilized, followed closely by the desired stylistic genres, and the way the garden space will connect to the home or other structures in the surrounding areas. All of these considerations are subject to the budget limitations. Budget limitations can be addressed by a simpler garden style with fewer plants and less costly hard landscape materials, seeds rather than sod for lawns, and plants that grow quickly; alternatively, garden owners may choose to create their garden over time, area by area.

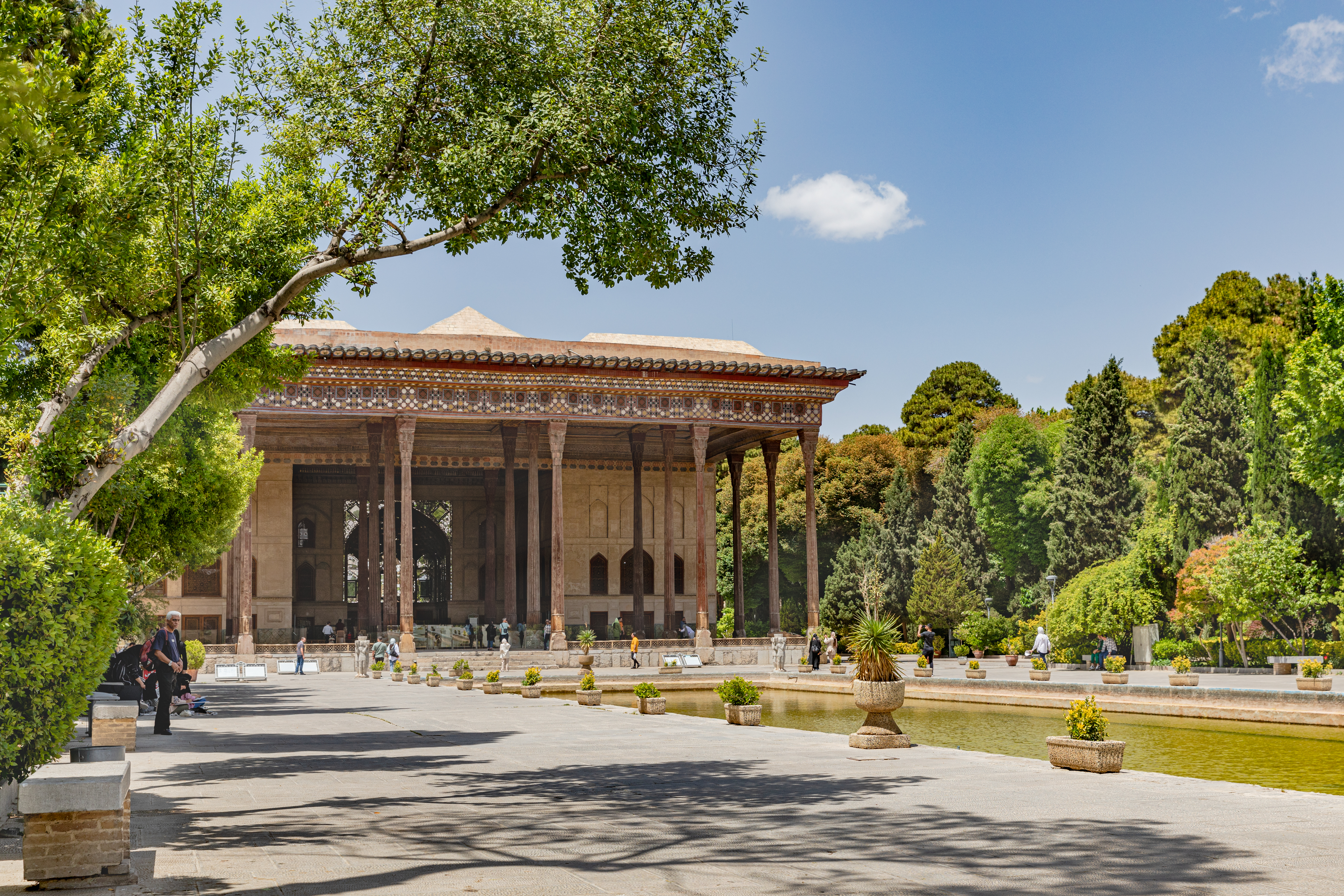
Chehel Sotoun Garden, Isfahan, Iran

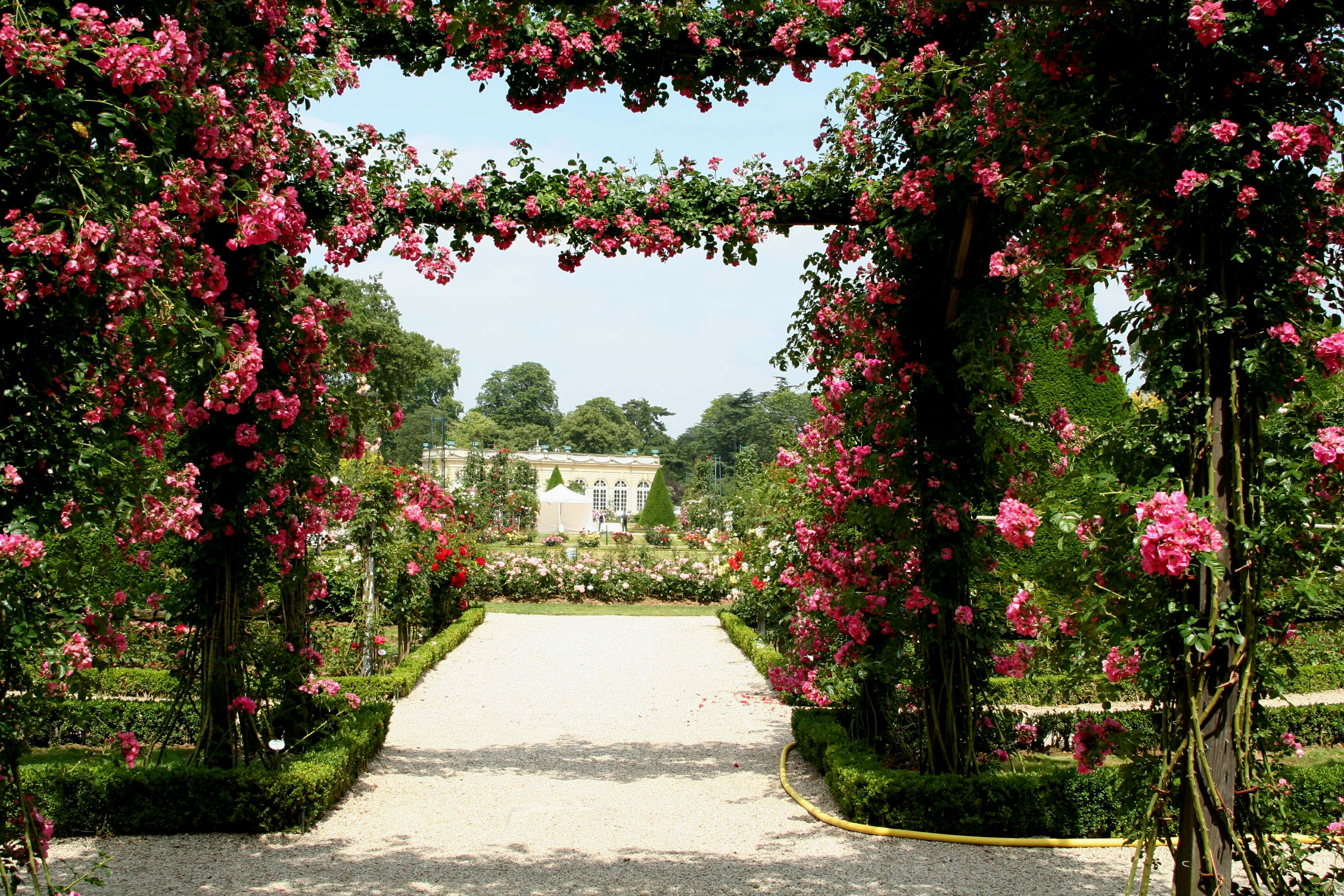
Parc de Bagatelle, a rose garden in Paris

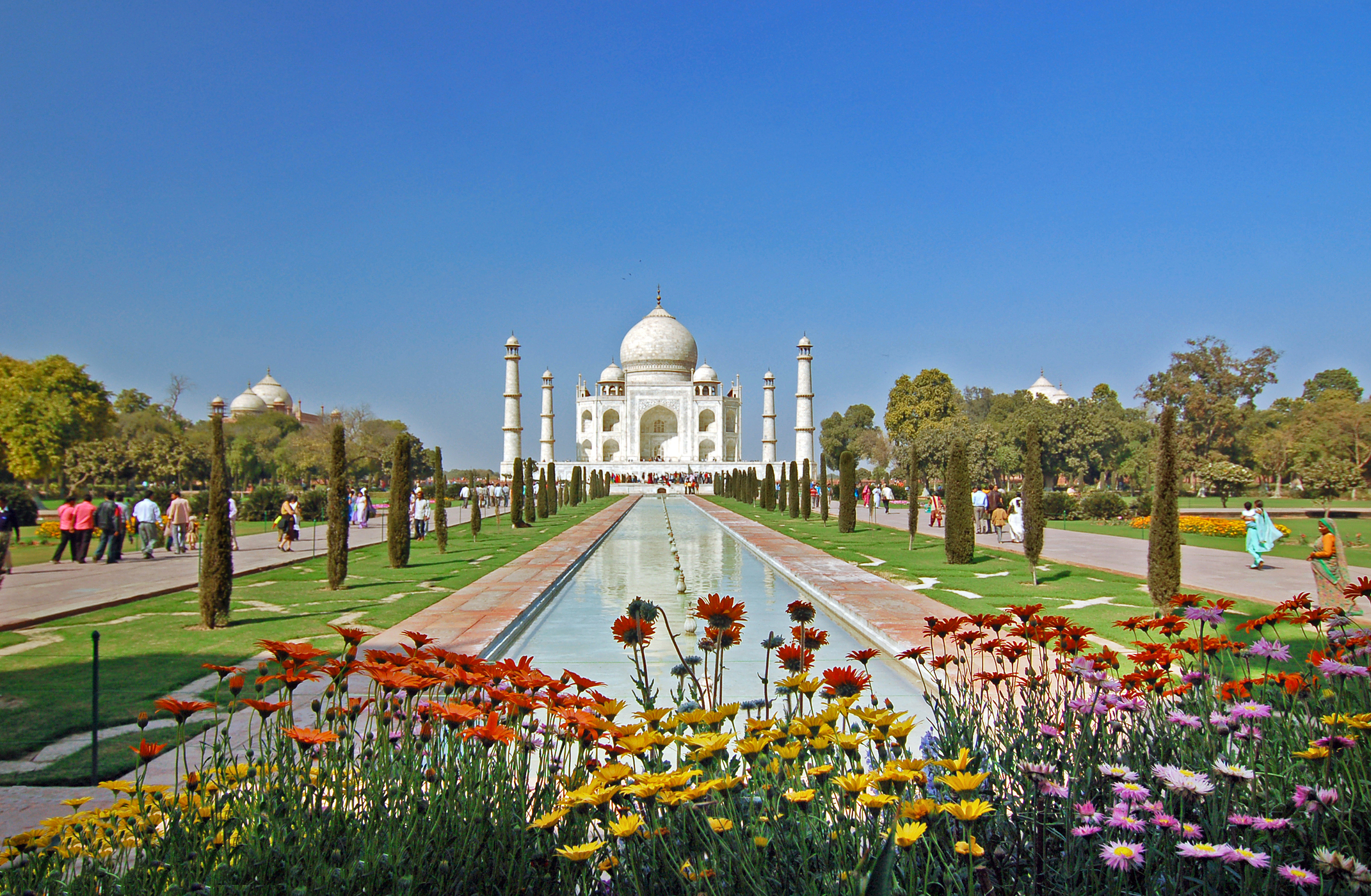
Garden of the Taj Mahal, India

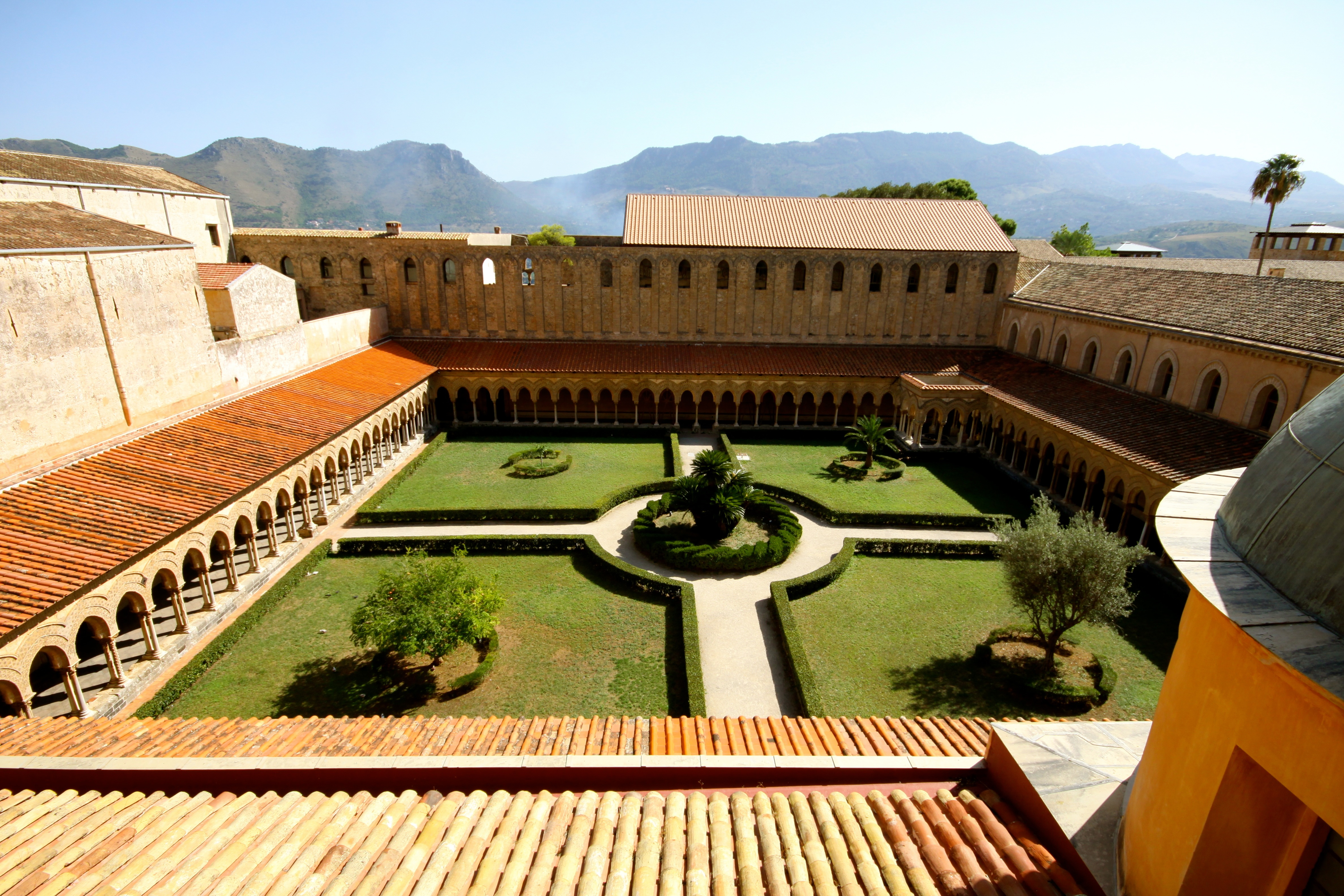
Example of a garden attached to a place of worship: the cloister of the Abbey of Monreale, Sicily, Italy

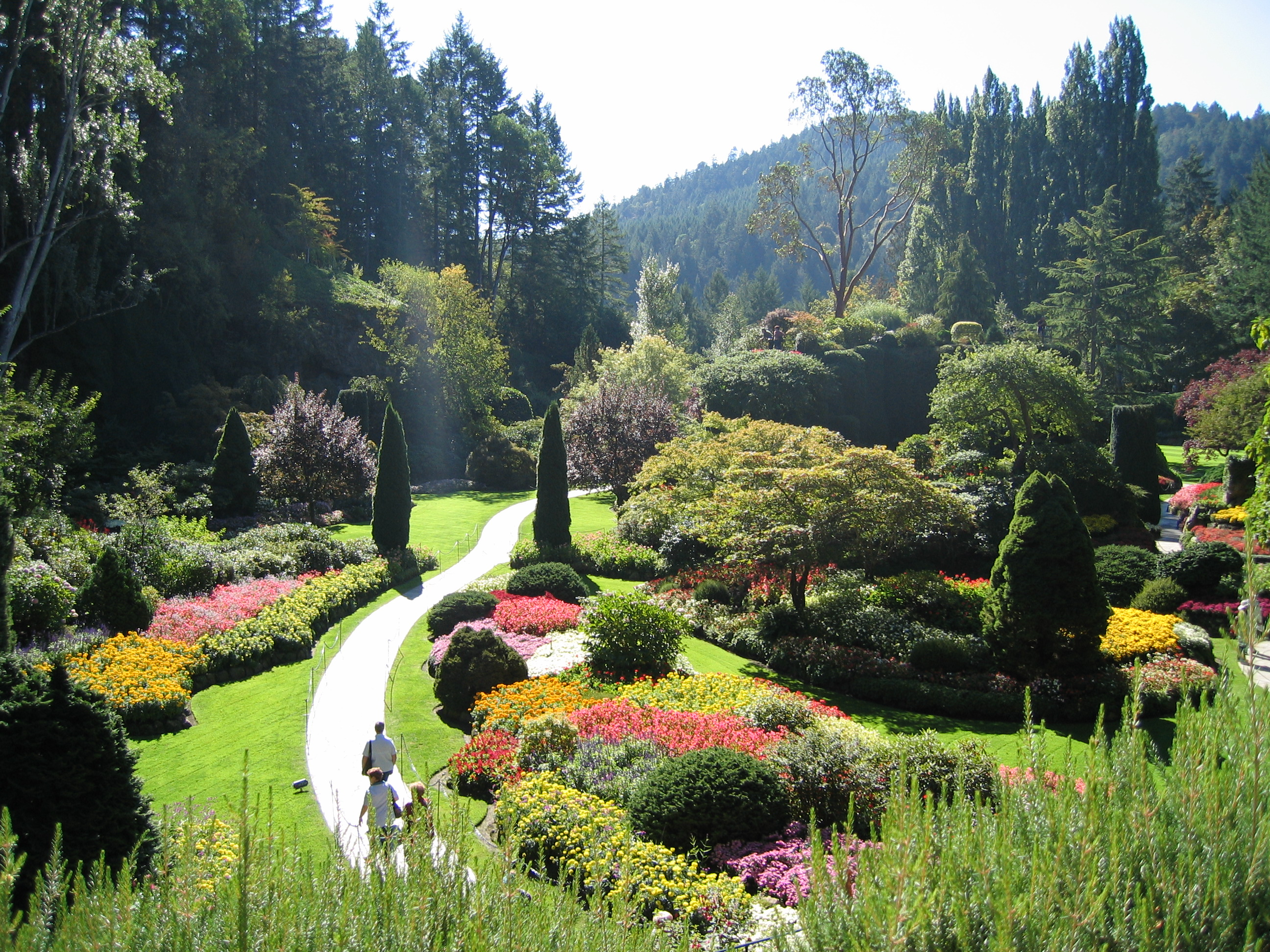
The Sunken Garden of Butchart Gardens, Victoria, British Columbia

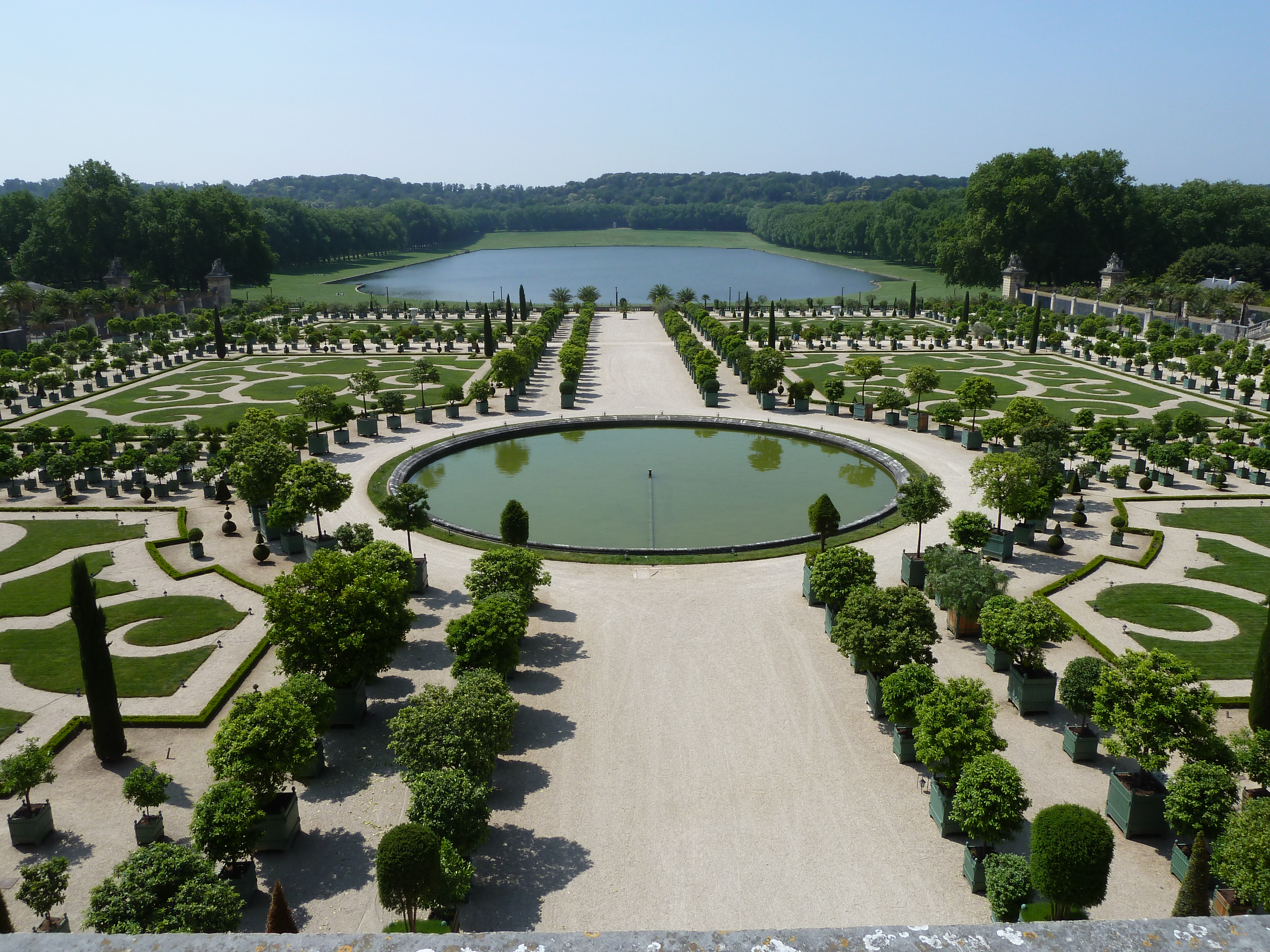
Gardens of Versailles (France)

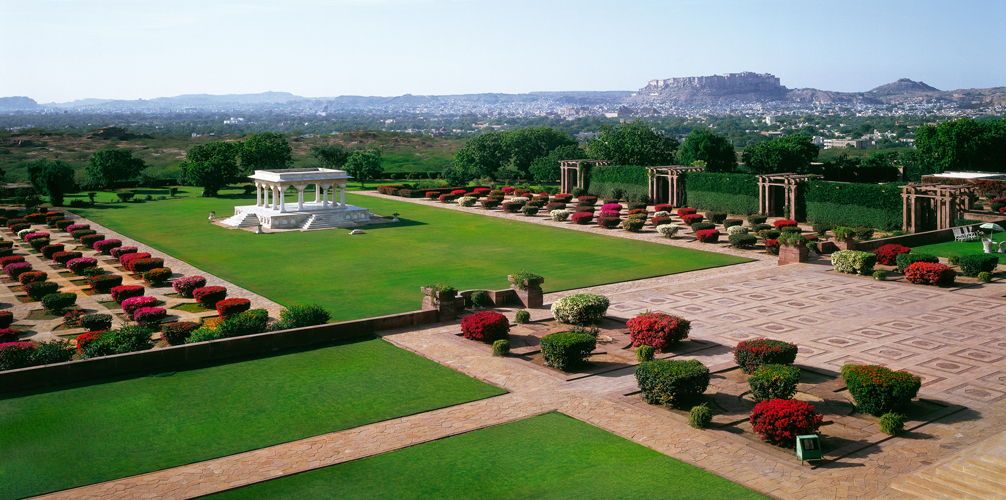
The back garden of the Umaid Bhawan Palace in Jodhpur, India

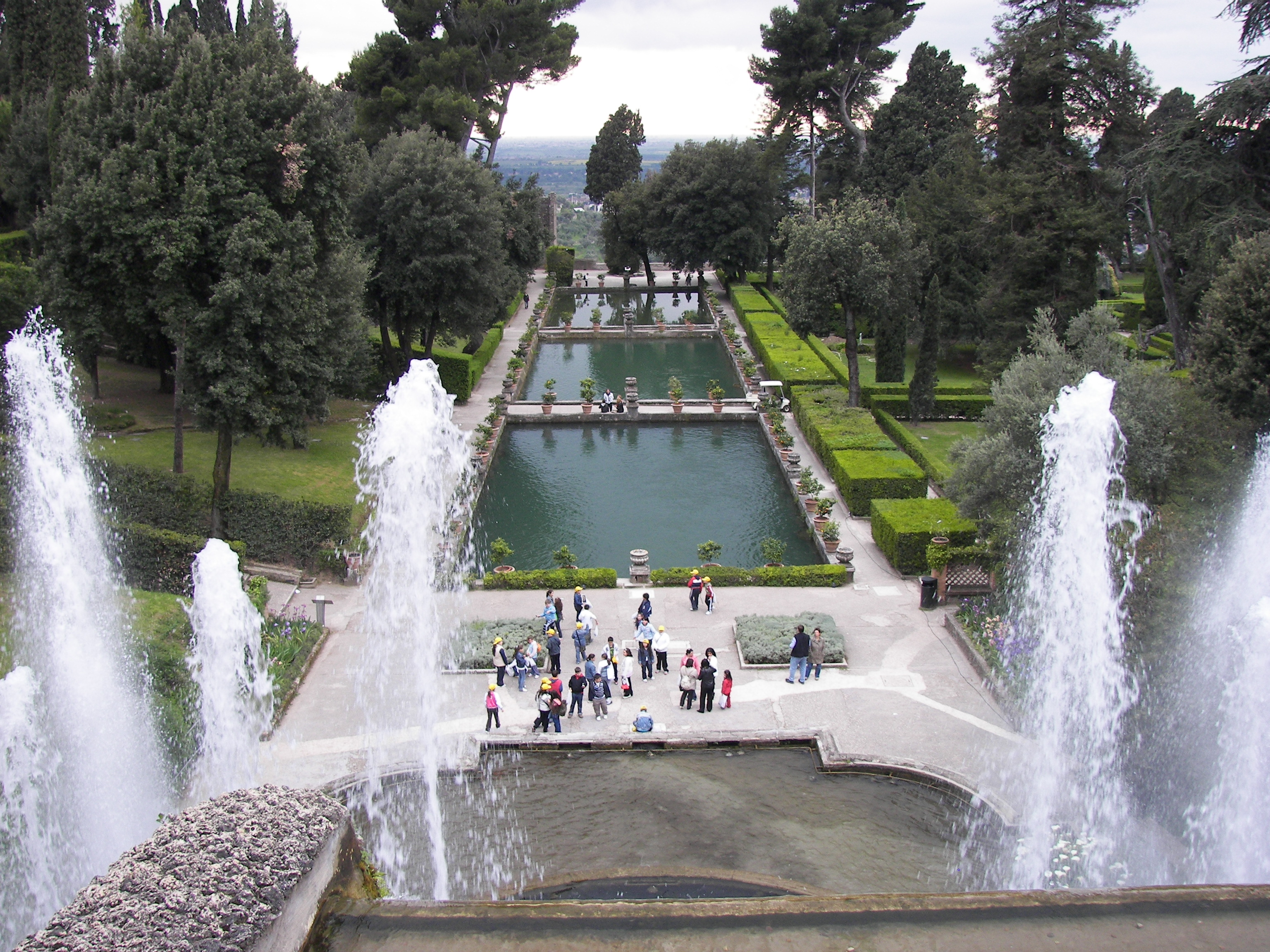
Garden with fountains, Villa d'Este, Italy

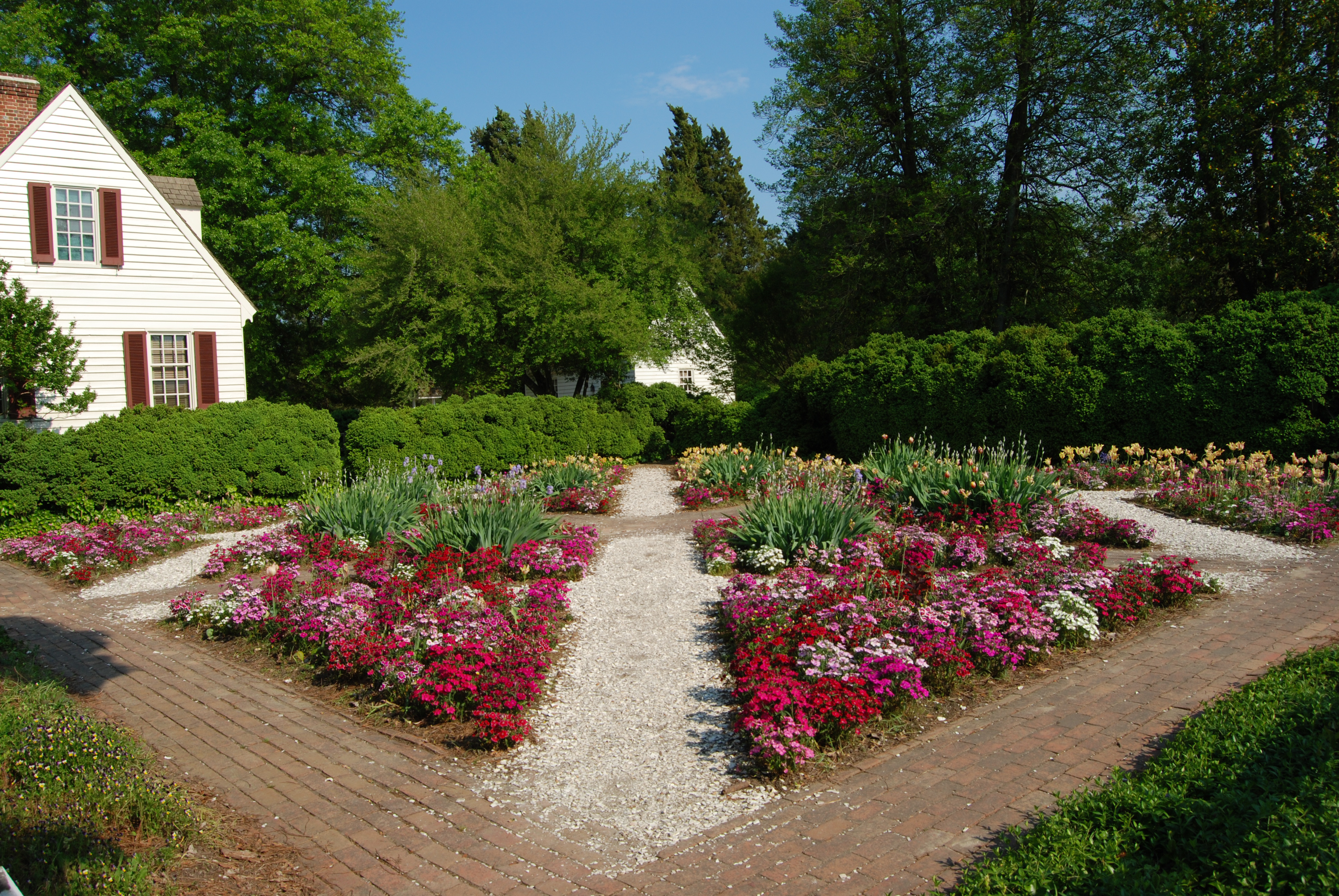
Gardens at Colonial Williamsburg, Williamsburg, Virginia, feature many heirloom varieties of plants.

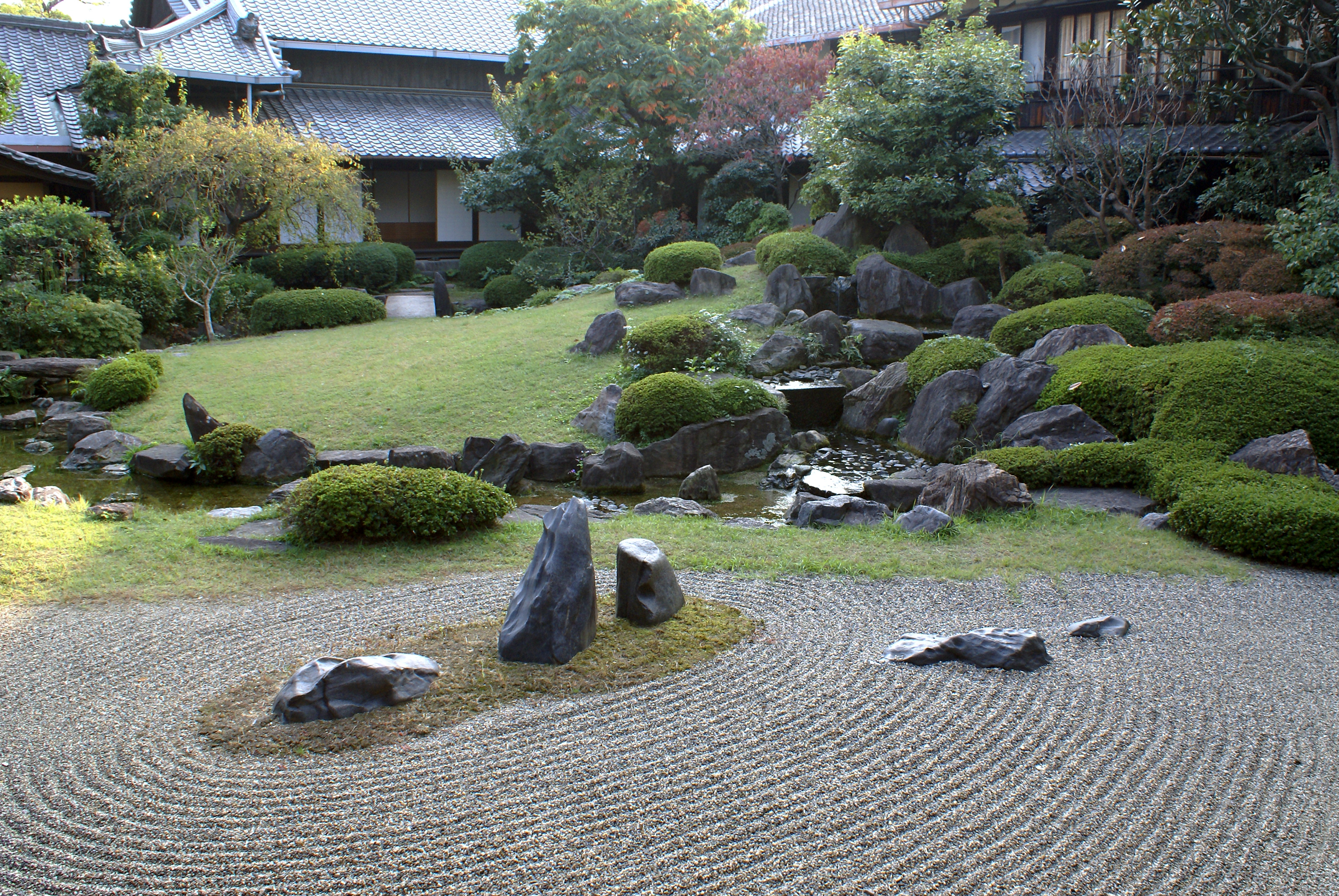
Shitennō-ji Honbo Garden in Osaka, Osaka Prefecture, Japan – an example of a Zen garden.

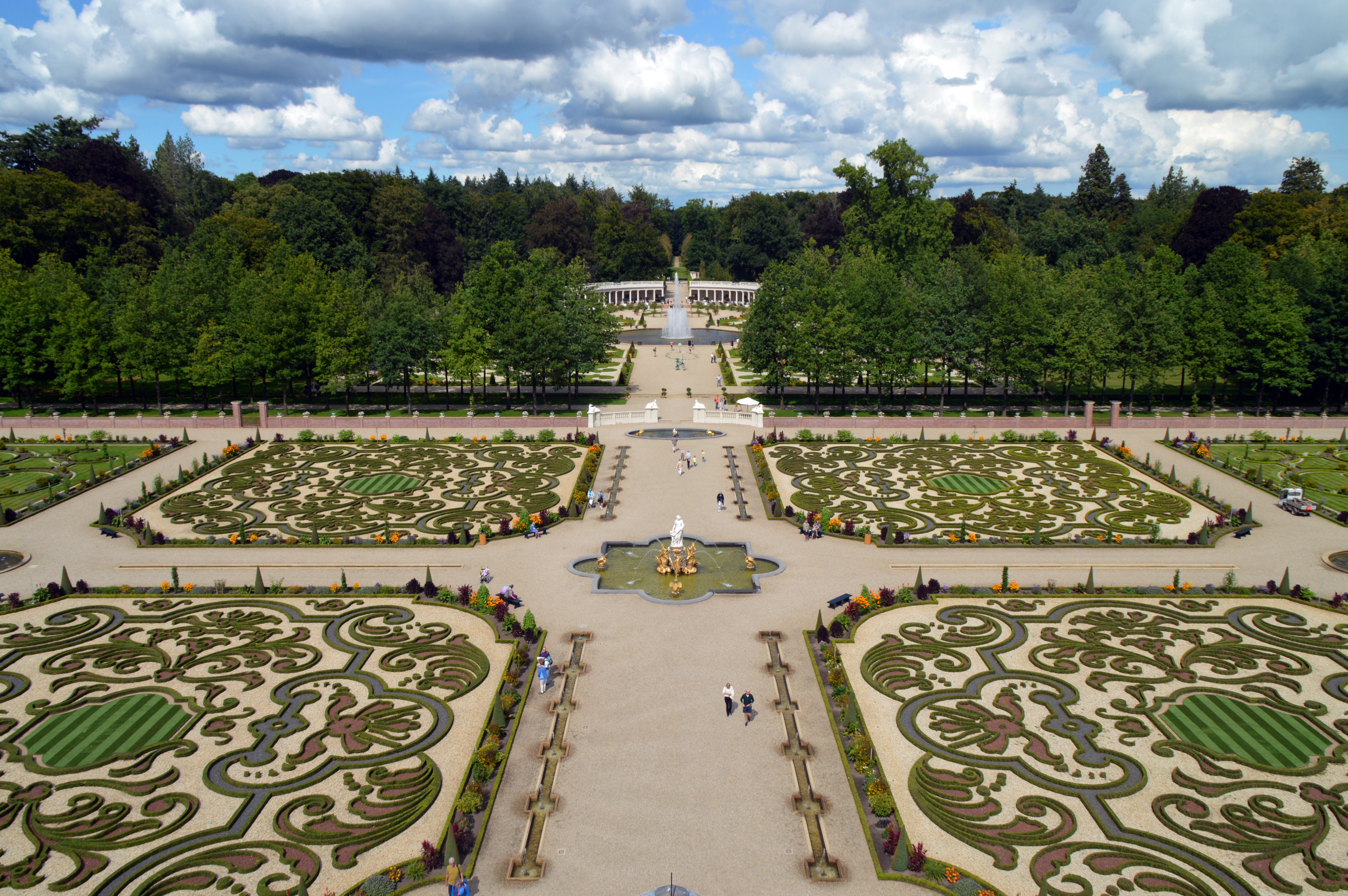
The Baroque garden of Het Loo Palace in the Netherlands.

== Types ==
	Types of gardens
Specific plant or purpose	Alpine garden, bog garden, cactus garden, fernery, flower garden, moss garden, orchard, physic garden (precursor to botanical gardens), pollinator garden, rose garden, water garden, wildlife garden (to sustain local wildlife), botanical garden, market garden (small-scale production of cash crops), victory garden (food grown to supplement wartime rations), butterfly garden, hydroponic garden (growing plants without soil), rain garden (reabsorption of rain run-off), and trial garden (testing and evaluating plants).
Specific style or aesthetic	Bonsai, color garden (monochromatic gardens or gardens designed with a visually appealing color scheme), Dutch garden, Garden room (secluded garden that has a "room-like" effect), German garden, Greek garden, knot garden (formal garden that is within a square frame), Mary garden (garden with a statue of the virgin Mary), monastic garden, moon garden, Mughal garden, natural landscaping (using plants native to the area), paradise garden, Pekarangan, Persian garden, philosophical garden, pleasure garden, Roman garden, sacred garden, sensory garden, Shakespeare garden (garden featuring plants mentioned in the works of Shakespeare), Spanish garden, tea garden, therapeutic garden, tropical garden, xeriscaping, zen garden, Chinampa, walled garden, woodland garden
Placement	Back garden, school garden, cottage garden, forest garden, front yard, community garden, square foot garden, residential garden, roof garden, kitchen garden, shade garden
Material	Bottle garden, terrarium, greenhouse, green wall, hanging garden, container garden, sculpture garden, raised bed gardening, rock garden, cold frame

== Environmental impact ==
Gardeners may cause environmental damage by the way they garden, or they may enhance their local environment. Damage by gardeners can include direct destruction of natural habitats when houses and gardens are created; indirect habitat destruction and damage to provide garden materials such as peat, rock for rock gardens, and by the use of tap water to irrigate gardens; the death of living beings in the garden itself, such as the killing not only of slugs and snails but also their predators such as hedgehogs and song thrushes by metaldehyde slug killer; the death of living beings outside the garden, such as local species extinction by indiscriminate plant collectors; and climate change caused by greenhouse gases produced by gardening.

=== Climate change ===
Gardeners can help to prevent climate change in many ways, including the use of trees, shrubs, ground cover plants and other perennial plants in their gardens, turning garden waste into soil organic matter instead of burning it, keeping soil and compost heaps aerated, avoiding peat, switching from power tools to hand tools or changing their garden design so that power tools are not needed, and using nitrogen-fixing plants instead of nitrogen fertilizer.

Climate change will have many impacts on gardens; some studies suggest most of them will be negative. Gardens also contribute to climate change. Greenhouse gases can be produced by gardeners in many ways. The three main greenhouse gases are carbon dioxide, methane, and nitrous oxide. Gardeners produce carbon dioxide directly by over-cultivating soil and destroying soil carbon, by burning garden waste on bonfires, by using power tools which burn fossil fuel or use electricity generated by fossil fuels, and by using peat. Gardeners produce methane by compacting the soil and making it anaerobic, and by allowing their compost heaps to become compacted and anaerobic. Gardeners produce nitrous oxide by applying excess nitrogen fertilizer when plants are not actively growing so that the nitrogen in the fertilizer is converted by soil bacteria to nitrous oxide.

== Irrigation ==
Some gardeners manage their gardens without using any water from outside the garden. Examples in Britain include Ventnor Botanic Garden on the Isle of Wight, and parts of Beth Chatto's garden in Essex, Sticky Wicket garden in Dorset, and the Royal Horticultural Society's gardens at Harlow Carr and Hyde Hall. Rain gardens absorb rainfall falling onto nearby hard surfaces, rather than sending it into stormwater drains.

== See also ==
- Index of gardening articles
- Outline of organic gardening and farming
- List of professional gardeners
- List of horticulture and gardening books/publications
