= Frank Billock =

American football player (1912–1964)

Profile
- Positions: Guard, tackle

Personal information
- Born: May 20, 1912; Grand Rapids, Minnesota
- Died: October 11, 1964 (aged 52); Wauwatosa, Wisconsin
- Listed height: 6 ft 0 in (1.83 m)
- Listed weight: 230 lb (104 kg)

Career information
- High school: Grand Rapids High School
- College: Saint Mary's University of Minnesota

Career history
- Pittsburgh Pirates (1937)

Career statistics as of Week 10, 1937
- Games Played: 2
- Games Started: 1
- Stats at Pro Football Reference

Francis Emil Billock (May 20, 1912 – October 11, 1964) was an American football lineman who played in the National Football League (NFL) with the Pittsburgh Pirates.

== Early life ==
Billock was born in Grand Rapids, Minnesota and attended Grand Rapids High School. Frank was one of eight children. Frank married Clairnita Steinmetz on December 27, 1937. They had three daughters Janet, Mary Elizabeth, and Judith. He attended college at Saint Mary's College, Winona, Minnesota on a football scholarship. Frank served in the United States Navy as a gunnery instructor at the Norman Oklahoma Naval Base before being assigned to a ship for overseas duty. Lieutenant JG Francis E. Billock received an honorable discharge from the U.S. Navy December 9, 1945.

== Professional football ==
Billock was acquired by the Pittsburgh Pirates in September 1937 in a trade with the Chicago Cardinals for center Lee Mulleneaux. Billock had played previously with a professional team, the Heileman Lagers in La Crosse, Wisconsin. He was with Pittsburgh for roughly a month during which time he played in two games, starting one. He was released by the Pirates in October 1937.

== Personal ==
Billock died in Wauwatosa, Wisconsin at the age of 52.
