= Mary garden =

Garden with statue of Virgin Mary

Garden at Saint Mary's University of Minnesota

A Mary garden is a small sacred garden enclosing a statue or shrine of the Virgin Mary, who is known to many Christians as the Blessed Virgin, Our Lady, or the Mother of God. In the New Testament, Mary is the mother of Jesus of Nazareth. Mary gardens are most common to those Christian denominations which hold the Virgin Mary in special esteem, particularly Roman Catholics, Evangelical-Lutherans and Anglicans.

== History ==
The practice originated among monasteries and convents in medieval Europe. During the Middle Ages, people saw reminders of Mary in the flowers and herbs growing around them.

== Modern revival ==
The first such garden open to the public in the United States was founded in 1932 at St. Joseph's Church, Woods Hole, Cape Cod, Massachusetts. This garden was founded by Frances Crane Lillie, a summer resident of Woods Hole.

Inspired by the St. Joseph's Mary Garden in Woods Hole, Edward A. G. McTague and John S. Stokes, Jr. founded "Mary's Gardens" of Philadelphia in 1951 as a project to research flowers identified with Mary, and make available seeds and plant source information for starting Mary gardens. They also initiated a series of articles in religious publications to encourage the planting of Mary gardens.

== Description ==
The statue of Mary, sometimes holding the Infant Christ, is central to the garden. Select flowers, shrubs, and trees associated with the legends about Mary are planted in the garden. Such plants may include laurel trees, strawberries, ladyslippers, lilies of the valley, peonies, violets, irises and roses, all of which are identified as symbolic and significant in the story of Mary as recounted in the Bible and other Christian stories. Gardens may have benches and a facility for lighting votive candles.

It demonstrates devotional commitment through the spiritual practice of designing, building and maintaining the garden and for the attendance, contemplation, and prayers of visitors. Mary gardens are similar to the Zen meditation gardens found in the Buddhist tradition, with the exception that a Mary Garden pays homage to a person, the Virgin Mary, whereas a meditation garden in the East Asian traditions does not focus on a person.

== Flowers associated with Mary ==
More than 30 flowers and herbs are connected to legends about Mary's life.

- Lily
- Columbine
- Lavender
- Madonna lily
- Marigold
- Violet
- Irises were used in Mary gardens. The blade-shaped foliage denotes the sorrows which 'pierced her heart.'

An effort has been made by the Saint Kateri Conservation Center as well as by the Marianist Environmental Education Center (MEEC) to identify plants indigenous to the Eastern and Midwestern US that can be used in a Mary Garden.

== Gallery ==
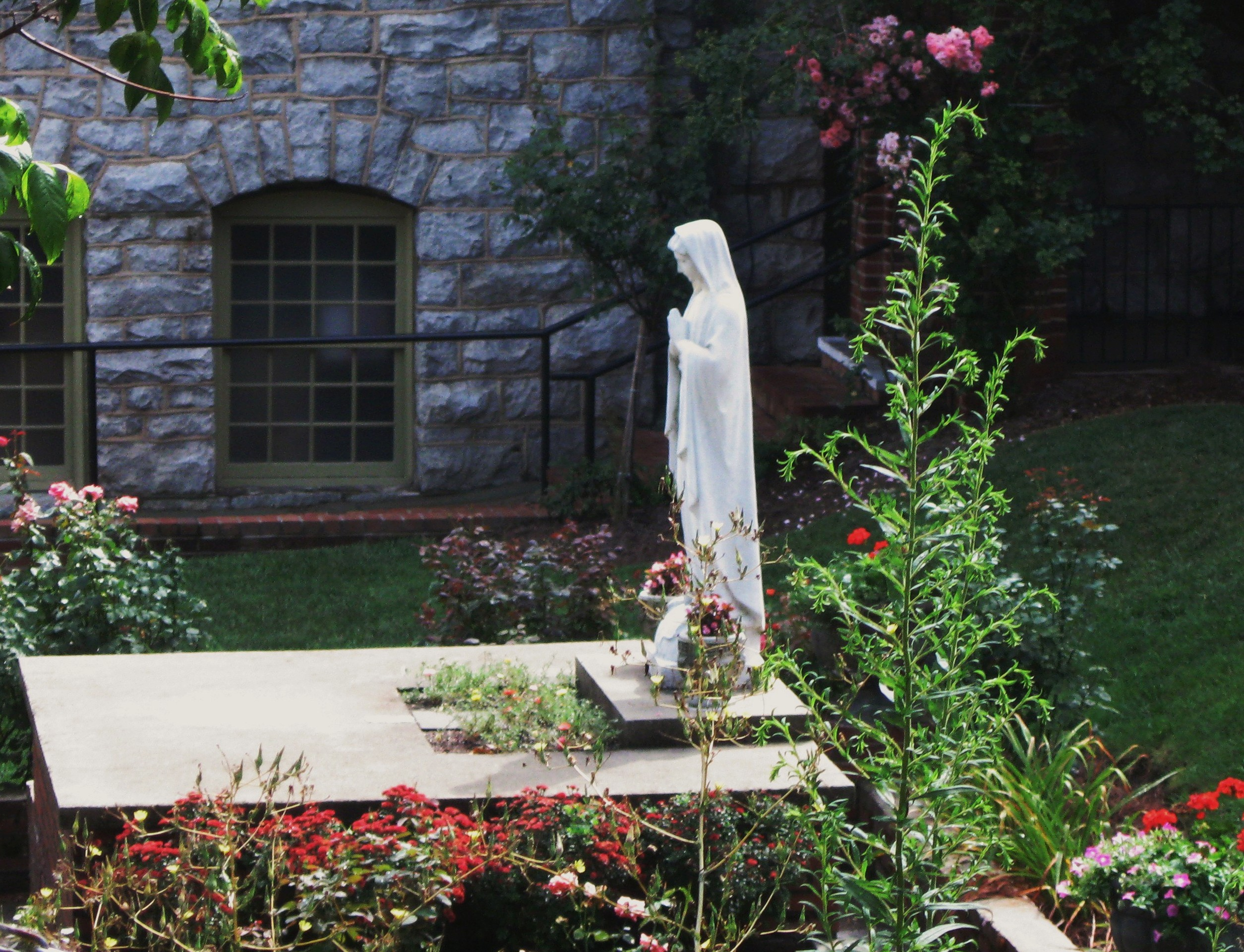
Mary garden at the Basilica of St. Lawrence in Asheville, North Carolina

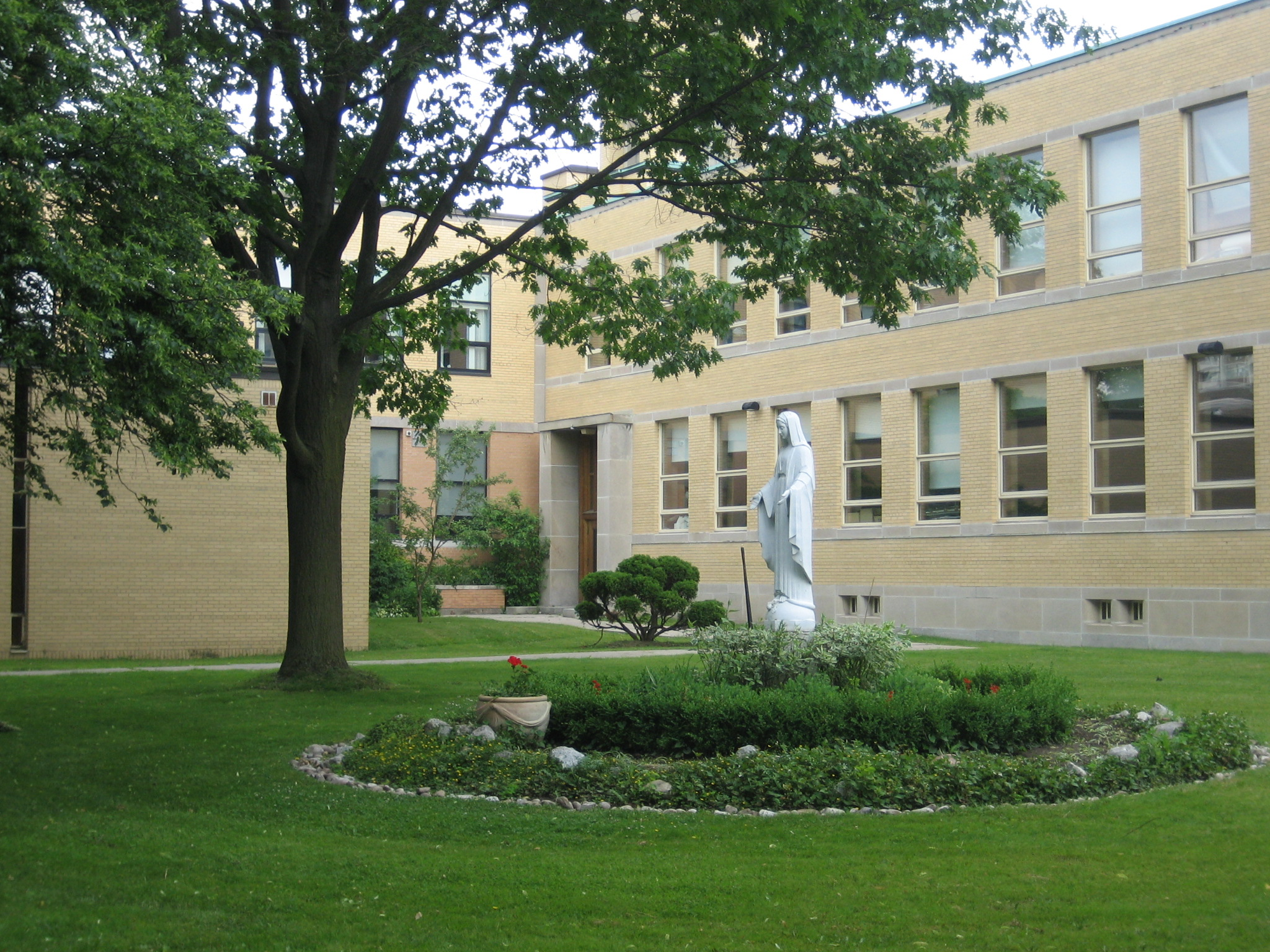
Mary garden at St. Michael's College School in Toronto, Ontario, Canada

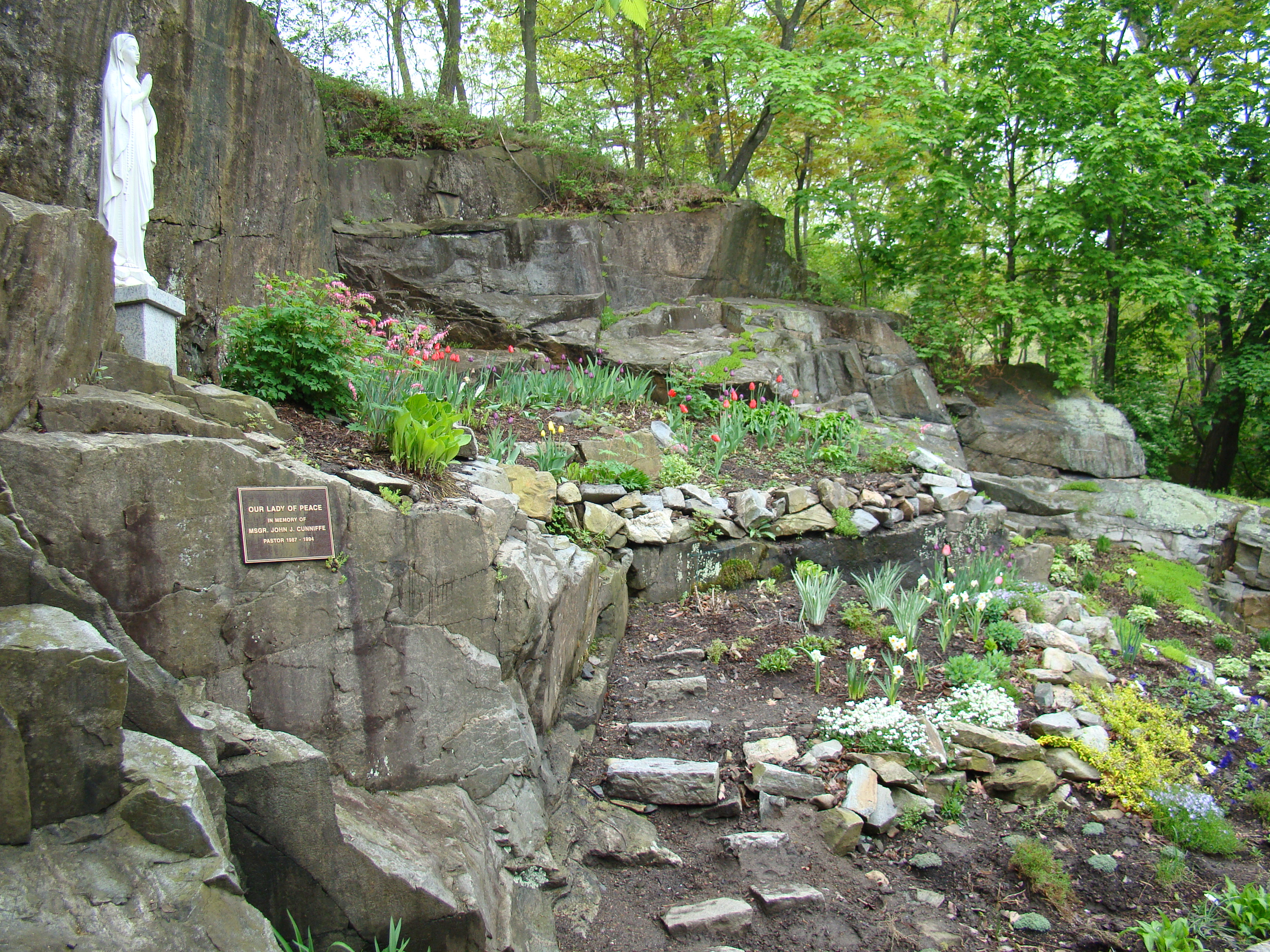
Mary garden at Chapel of the Most Holy Trinity at the West Point Military Academy in New York

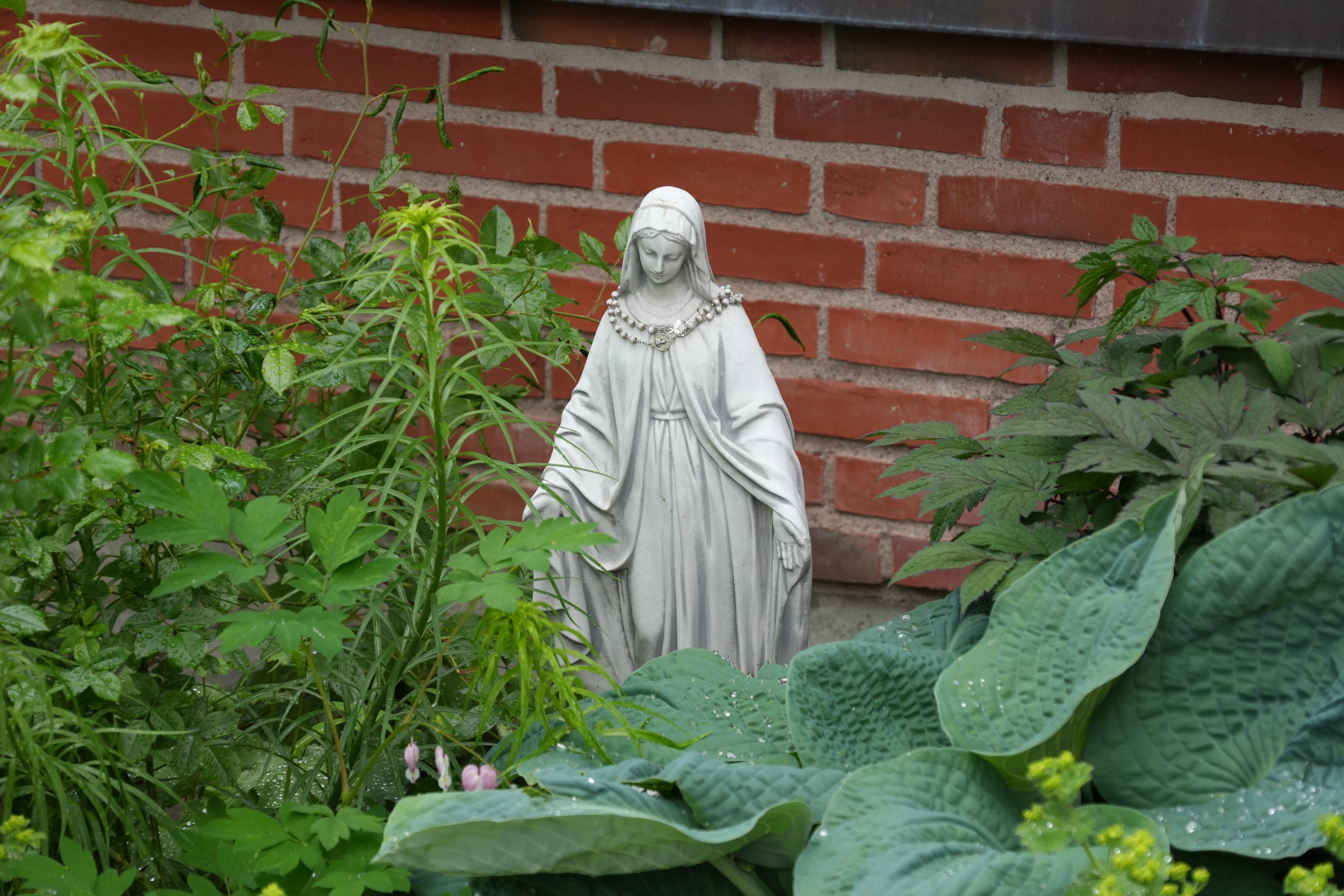
The Mary garden of Kummelby Kyrka (Evangelical-Lutheran) in Sollentuna Municipality, Sweden

== See also ==
- Catholic devotions
- Anglican devotions
- Sacramentals
- Hortus conclusus
