= Sacred garden =

Religiously-influenced garden

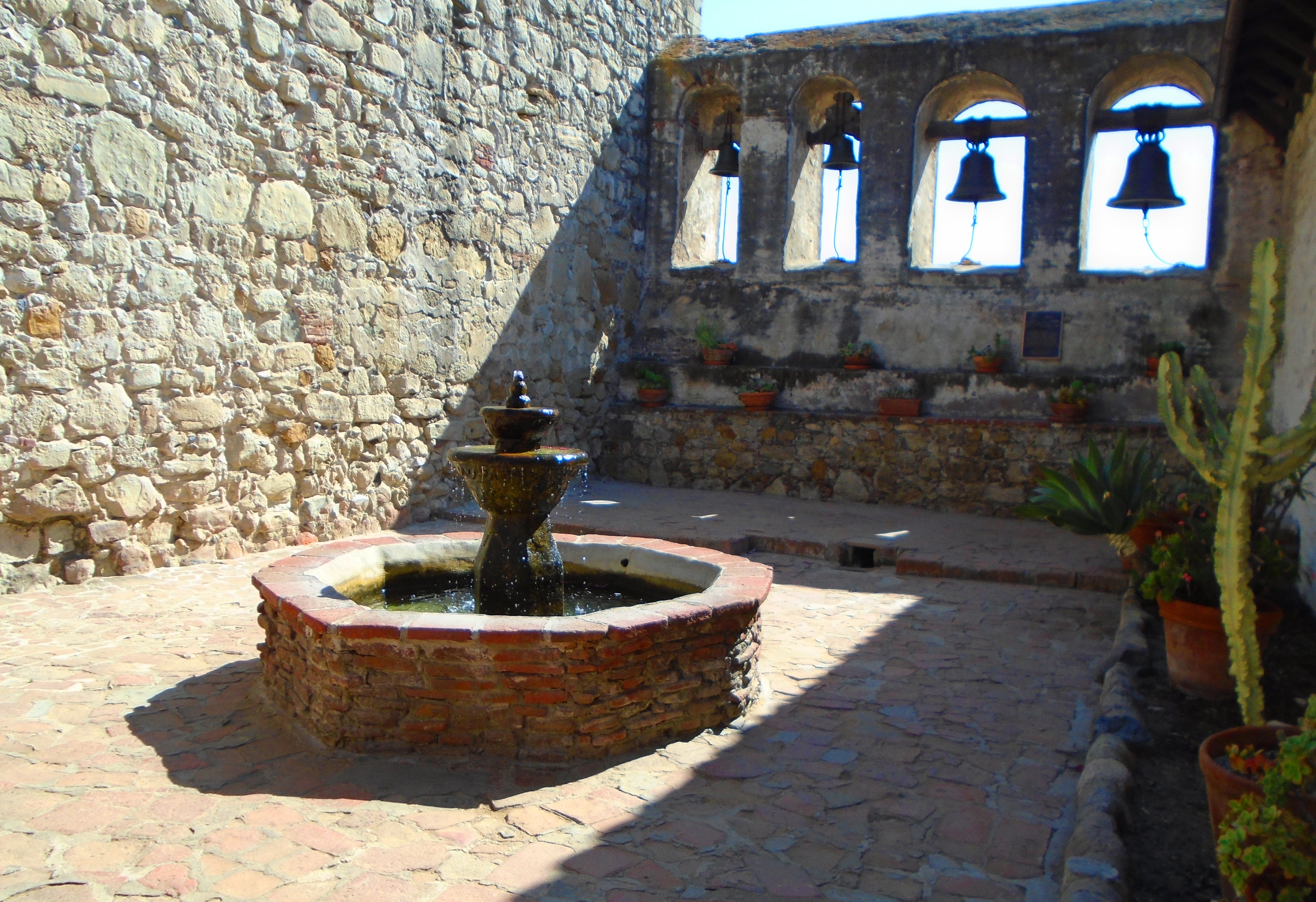
Sacred garden at Mission San Juan Capistrano in California

A sacred garden is a religiously influenced garden, often found on temple grounds.

== Overview ==
Religion has been an important influence on garden design. Temple gardens were made in Mesopotamia and ancient Egypt. Sacred groves were made in ancient India, Greece, Rome, China and Japan. Sacred trees were important in Celtic and Germanic Europe and still are important in India.

Many groves or forests were sacred in ancient India and continue to be so in modern Hindu worship. Buddhism had a significant influence on garden design, with the Zen gardens of China and Japan as famous examples. In Christianity, particularly Catholicism and Anglicanism, Mary gardens are common among churches and institutions.

The practise of creating sacred gardens is re-invigorated and adapted for modern times in the Ringing Cedars series of books by Russian author Vladimir Megre.

== In Japan ==
The Japanese new religion Oomoto's spiritual headquarters in Ayabe, Kyoto, called Baishō-en (梅松苑), has a garden centered around an artificial lake called Kinryūkai (金竜海) (lit. 'Golden Dragon Sea'). The garden is designed as a microcosm representing both the Japanese archipelago and the world's continents, with different islands in the lake corresponding to different Japanese islands, or alternatively world continents.

== See also ==
- List of plants for Biblical gardens
- List of garden types
