= Park and Portland Avenues (Minneapolis) =

Pair of streets in Hennepin County, Minnesota

County State-Aid Highway 35
- Portland Avenue

Route information
- Maintained by Hennepin County Public Works
- Length: 10.7 mi (17.2 km)

Location
- Country: United States
- State: Minnesota
- County: Hennepin

Highway system
- County roads of Minnesota; Hennepin County

County State-Aid Highway 33
- Park Avenue

Route information
- Maintained by Hennepin County Public Works
- Length: 4.1 mi (6.6 km)

Location
- Country: United States
- State: Minnesota
- County: Hennepin

Highway system
- County roads of Minnesota; Hennepin County

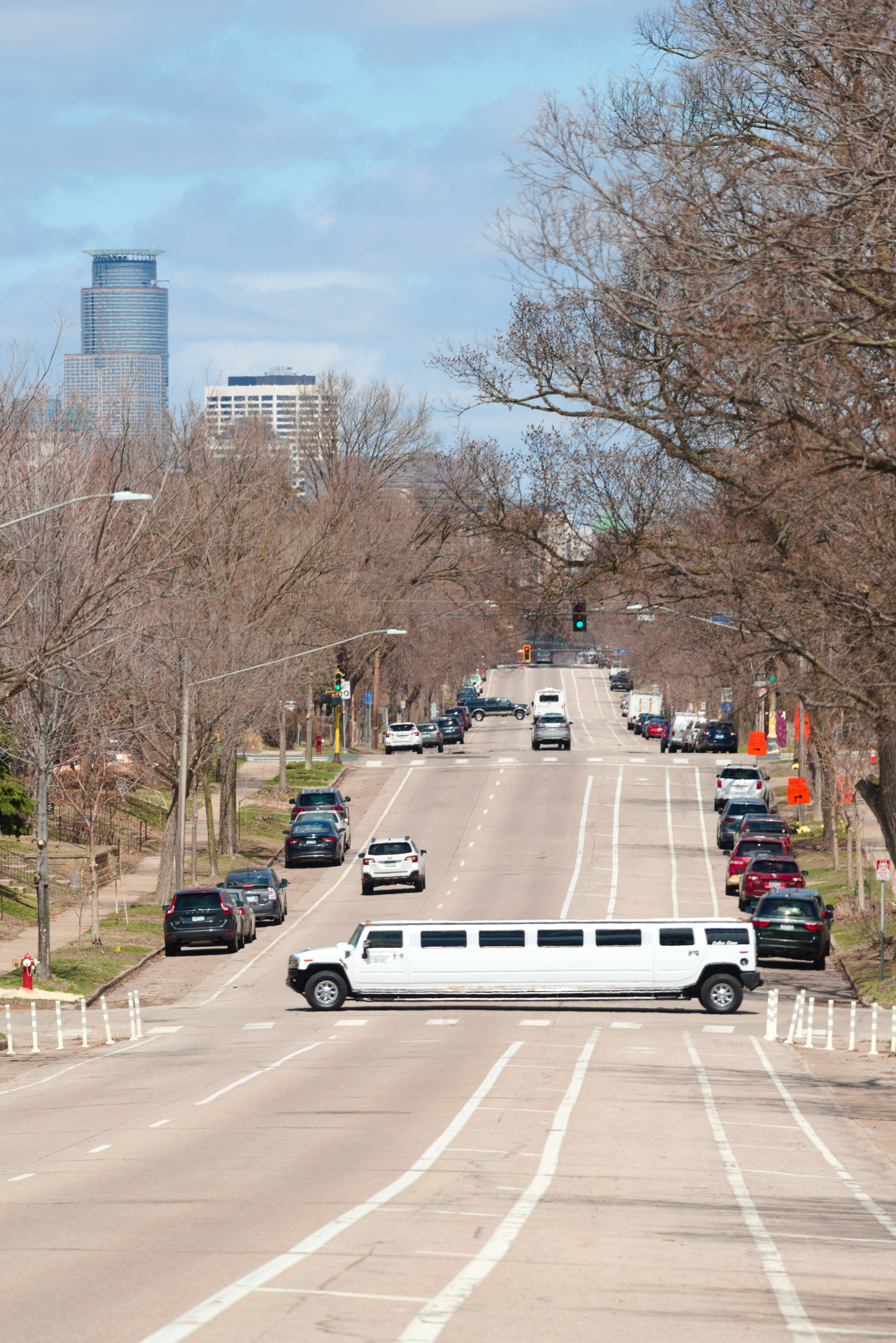
Looking north on Park Ave towards downtown Minneapolis at 39th Street.

Park Avenue and Portland Avenue are a pair of streets in Hennepin County, Minnesota. The northern terminus of the streets is in downtown Minneapolis. They initially run as a one-way pair, but south of 46th Street, Portland Avenue continues as a two-way arterial street while Park Avenue is a minor street and not part of the major route. The streets serve Richfield and Bloomington south of Minneapolis. A shorter portion of Portland Avenue also exists in Burnsville, but it is not contiguous to the Hennepin County route.

During the 1880s, mansions began being built along Park Avenue and the street was one of the most expensive in Minneapolis. The era of mansions on Park Avenue was short-lived and by the 1910s, many mansions had been separated into smaller living units. Increased traffic on Park Avenue furthered the decline of the avenue and in the 1940s, Park and Portland avenues were converted to one-way streets between 46th Street and downtown Minneapolis.

Safety on the avenues have been a concern for drivers, pedestrians and bicyclists. High vehicle speeds, including using the streets for drag racing, have led to many crashes.

== History ==
Some of the most expensive homes in Minneapolis were built along Park Avenue in the 1880s, especially in the stretch between 18th Street and 28th Street. The Park Avenue Improvement Association helped fund the addition of trees, sidewalks, and curbs to the street. Park Avenue was the first street in Minneapolis to be paved with asphalt. Up to 36 mansions were located on the street at one point. A report by the Minneapolis Heritage Preservation Committee described the street as "Minneapolis’ answer to St. Paul's Summit Avenue"

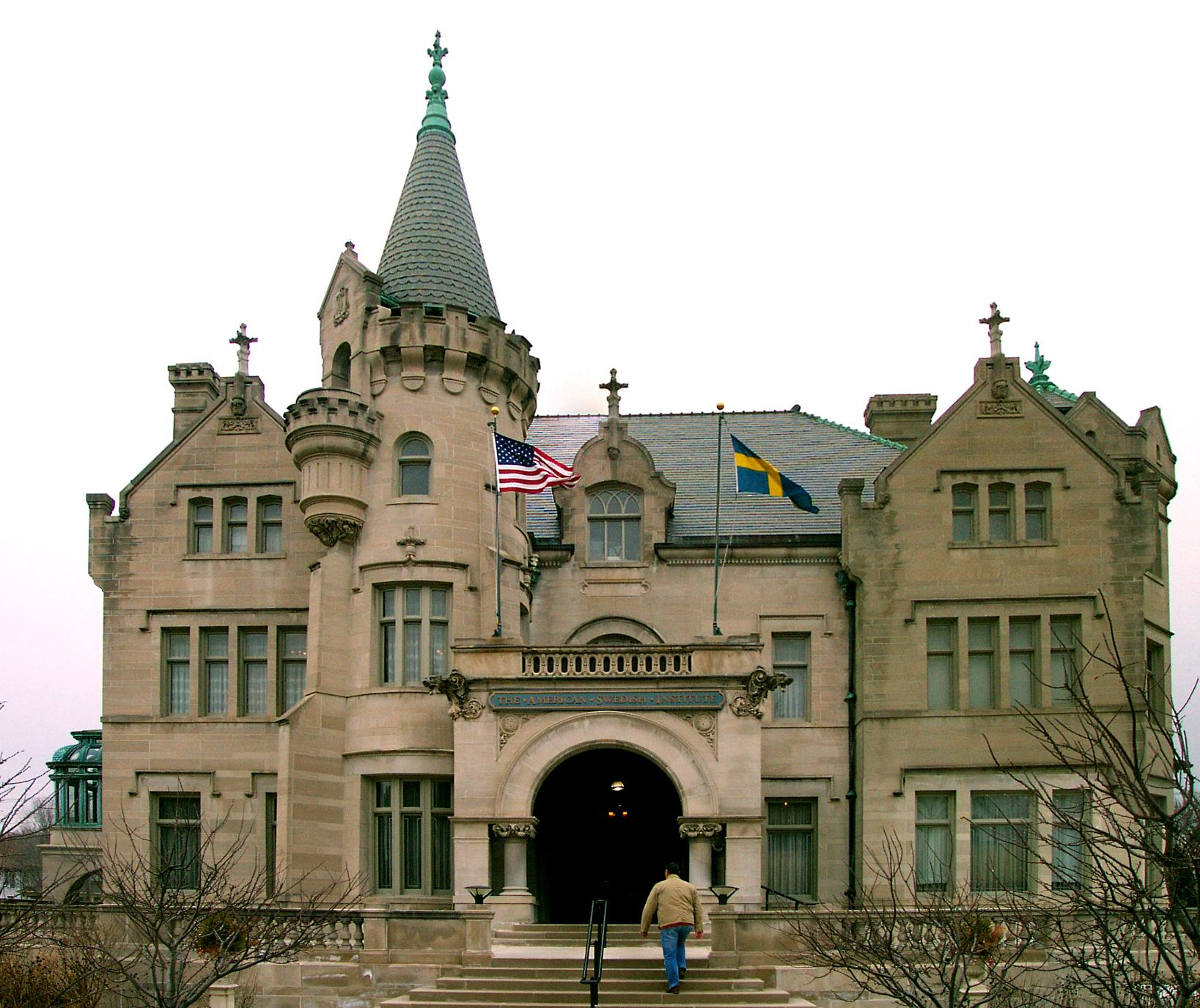
The Swan Turnblad Mansion now hosts the American Swedish Institute.

Many of the large homes north of 26th Street had been subdivided by 1910, and in the 1950s and 1960s commercial and intuitional landowners had moved onto the street. Many of the wealthy families that lived near Park Avenue eventually moved westward towards the Kenwood neighborhood and the nearby lakes. Only 8 of the mansions remain which include the Swan Turnblad Mansion and Charles M. Harrington Mansion.

As early as the 1900s, Park Ave residents began requesting the city to limit types of traffic on the street and by the 1920s, residents on both streets were requesting a ban on heavy trucks. Traffic continued to grow on the streets with the pair converted to one-way streets in 1946 and Park Avenue widened by 20 feet (6.1 m) in 1955 to add a third lane of traffic. Portland Avenue was designated as southbound, while Park Avenue was designated as northbound. Interstate 35W, which is parallel to the avenues and allows faster access to downtown, opened in 1967 but the third lane of traffic remained.

Portland Avenue was originally named "Cataract Street" for starting at the base of St. Anthony Falls. Portland Avenue did not have as many large homes and wealthy families as Park Avenue.

By the 1990s the Phillips neighborhood which includes Park Avenue between Franklin Avenue and Lake Street was one of the poorest in the city.

== Traffic safety ==
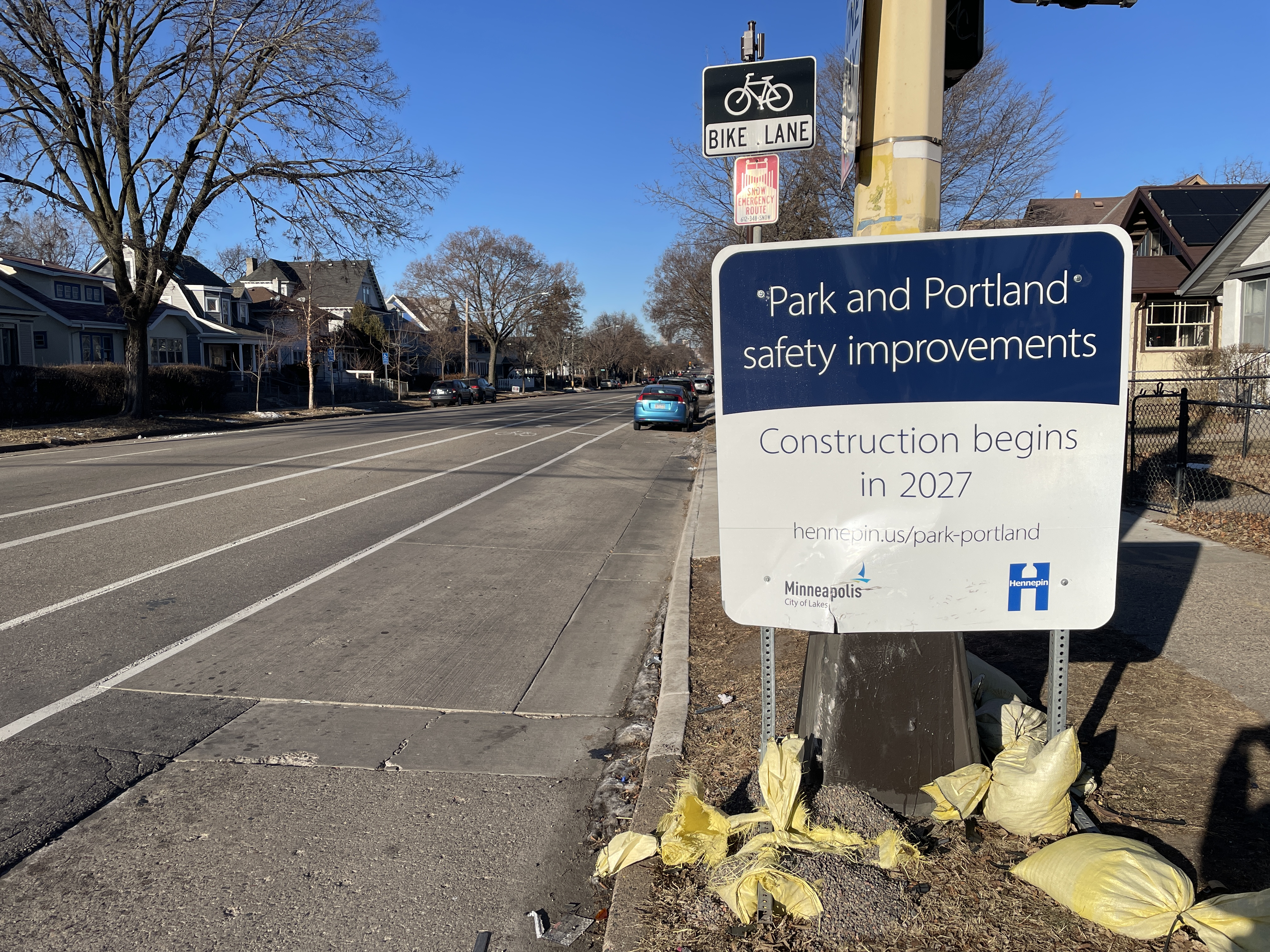
A damaged street sign on Park Avenue looking north from 38th Street in Minneapolis.

Dangerous conditions for pedestrians and bicyclists led to Hennepin County proposing changes to the avenues in 2012 when both streets were repaved. The result was both streets had the number of travel lanes mostly reduced from three lanes to two lanes. Bike lanes were widened and moved to the right side of the street. The speed limit was reduced from 35 miles per hour to 30 miles per hour. Three travel lanes were retained at busy intersections resulting in narrower bicycle buffers at the most congested areas.

Despite the wide buffered zones, continued high vehicle speeds and the use of the bike lanes as delivery vehicle space led to them being named among the worst bike lanes in Minneapolis by Racket in 2022.

Hennepin County applied for federal funding to improve safety on Park and Portland Avenues in 2022 and 2023. Both applications won federal funding and included elements to improve safety such as medians, separating the bike lanes from traffic with a physical curb, and bumping out streets at intersections to improve pedestrian safety and crossings. Hennepin County plans to design safety improvements in 2025 and 2026 with construction happening in 2027 and 2028.
