= Harrington Mansion and Events Center =

Coordinates: 44°57′21.4″N 93°15′57″W

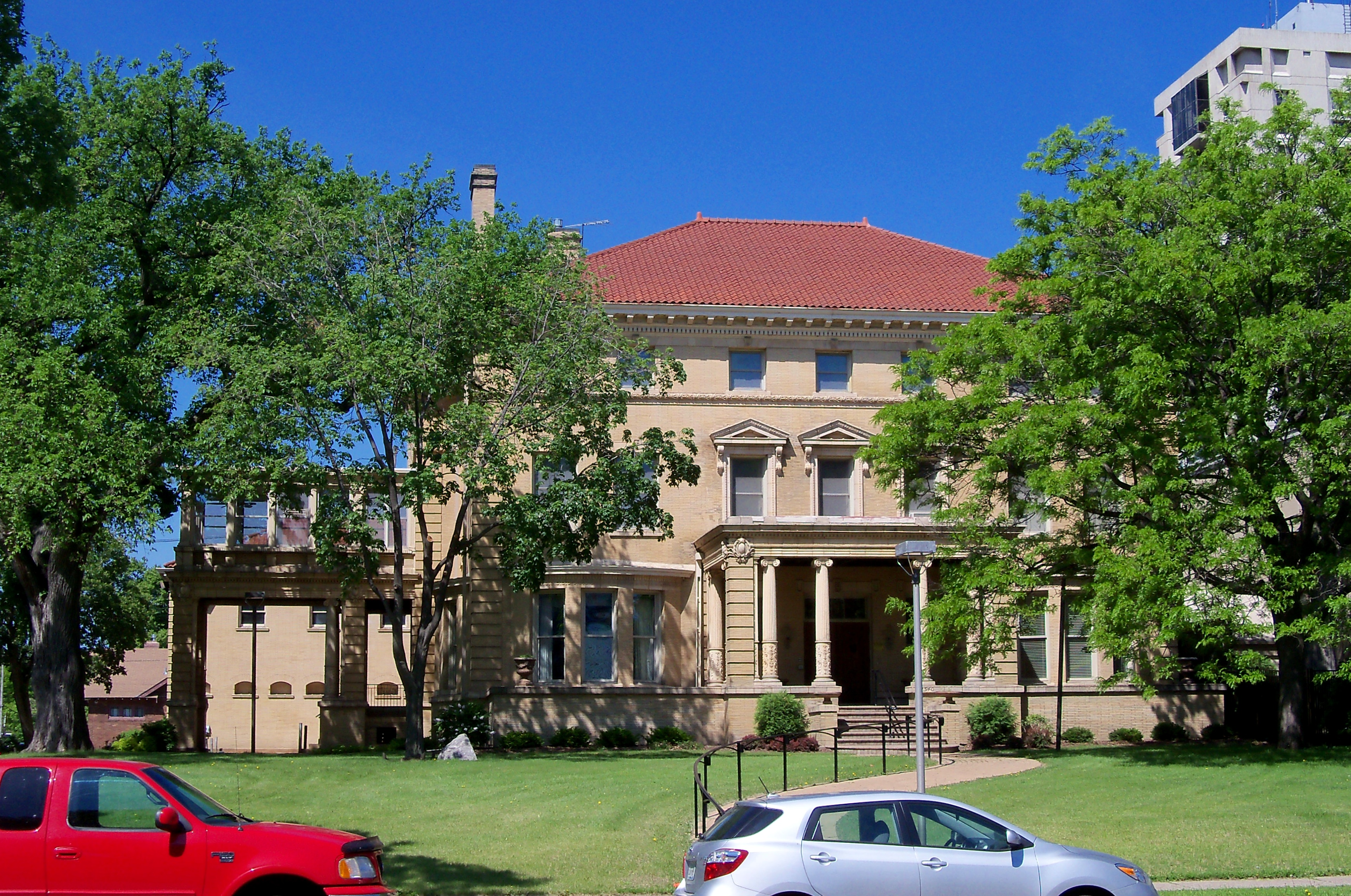
The Harrington Mansion

The Harrington Mansion and Events Center is a historic property at 2540 Park Avenue in Minneapolis, Minnesota, United States. The estate was built in 1902 for the family of Charles Harrington, who oversaw the Minneapolis office for the Van Dusen-Harrington Company, which specialized in grain processing and distribution.

The Harrington Mansion and Events Center was purchased by Saint Mary's University of Minnesota in 2011, as the newest addition to Saint Mary's Minneapolis campus. The estate was previously owned by the Zuhrah Shrine, which bought the property from the Harrington family in 1929.

The Harrington Mansion and Events Center, with a historic mansion, carriage house, modern events center, and 124 parking spaces, encompasses 1.66 acres in South Minneapolis. The historic mansion and carriage house cover 30,000 square feet, and the events center, built in 1990, contains 54,000 square feet.

== History of the Harrington mansion ==
=== Architecture ===
Designated historic by the Minneapolis Heritage Preservation Commission in 1988, the Italian Renaissance-style mansion was constructed by the Pike and Cook construction firm under the architectural direction of Frederick Kees and Serenus Colburn. Kees and Colburn also designed the Minneapolis Grain Exchange Building and the Loring Theater (formerly the Music Box Theater).

During the construction, owner Charles Harrington hired prominent interior designer John Scott Bradstreet as well as artisans from Norway and Sweden to perfect the home's ornamental décor. According to the Minneapolis Heritage Preservation Commission, the original Italian mosaic on the main entrance floor, ornate brass fittings, painted murals on the ceilings and walls, light fixtures, and the staircase woodcarvings that were done on a hand-peddled wood lathe can still be seen inside the mansion today.

While occupied by the Harrington family, the mansion contained a library, drawing room, dining room, den, kitchen, and servants’ hall; the family's bedrooms were located on the second floor. Each room on the second floor was once connected with the one adjoining it, so an entire circuit of the house could be made without entering the hallway. A ballroom and auditorium filled the third floor, while billiard and card rooms were housed in the basement. A June 1904 Western Architect article described the architectural elegance of the estate in great detail.

=== The Harrington family ===
Charles Harrington was born in New York in 1855 and moved to Rochester, Minnesota, in 1871 to work for the railroad industry. Shortly after, Harrington switched to the grain business and later partnered with George Van Dusen in 1889 to establish the Van Dusen-Harrington Company, a grain processing and distribution firm.

As president of the company's Minneapolis office, Charles Harrington decided to build a house on Park Avenue, which was home to many of Minneapolis's wealthiest residents during the early 1900s. According to the 1910 federal census, Charles; his wife Grace (Ross) Harrington; their daughter Laura; Mrs. Harrington's sister, Isabel Ross; and three servants lived in the residence.

In 1905 Laura Harrington married Walter Hudson, president of JB Hudson Jewelers, and their wedding reception was held in the mansion's ballroom. The couple lived with Mr. and Mrs. Harrington until 1917, when they bought a nearby property at 2400 Pillsbury Avenue.

A Minneapolis business leader, Charles Harrington helped organize the Minneapolis Chamber of Commerce and served as the organization's president from 1890 to 1900. Charles served as president of the Van Dusen-Harrington Company until he died in 1928. The mansion was vacant until the Zuhrah Shrine acquired it in 1929 for its Zuhrah Temple.

=== The Zuhrah Shrine ===
The Zuhrah Shrine purchased the Harrington mansion in 1929 for $25,000. The organization used the mansion for Zuhrah events, meetings, and office space for 80 years. Under its ownership, the Zuhrah Shrine added a modern events center to the historic property. While the events center has been rebuilt twice, with the most recent construction taking place in 1990, the historic mansion remains largely intact. The Zuhrah Shrine sold the estate to Saint Mary's University of Minnesota in 2011.

== Present uses ==
=== Saint Mary’s University of Minnesota ===
Based in Winona, Minnesota, Saint Mary's University of Minnesota expanded its educational programs to serve the Twin Cities community by establishing a Minneapolis campus in 1983, located at 2500 Park Avenue South, less than one block from the Harrington estate.

Saint Mary's University plans to use the Harrington property for its graduate programs, community outreach, and alumni events. The 54,000-square-foot events center is available for private conferences, banquets, and other events. The property also includes 124 parking spaces.

Approximately 4,300 students are currently enrolled in the Schools of Graduate and Professional Programs, which is based at Saint Mary's Minneapolis campus.
