= George Kenning (business consultant) =

- Born: September 23, 1913; Wisconsin, United States
- Died: November 3, 1988 (aged 75)
- Occupation(s): Manager and consultant

George Kenning (September 23, 1913 – November 3, 1988) was an American manager and consultant. He began his career as a metal finisher at General Motors' (GM) Fisher Body Division plant in Janesville, Wisconsin. After outstanding achievement at St. Mary's College in Minnesota, he was invited to study engineering at the General Motors Institute in Flint, Michigan, and later became an executive in GM's personnel operations. In 1950, Kenning moved to Antwerp where he became director of personnel at General Motors Continental. He left GM in 1954 to join Kelly-Read and Company, Inc. In 1955, he was sent by the United States State Department to Norway aid industrial development in that country. He continued to work as business consultant in Norway for the next 30 years. He counseled Norwegian companies in a variety of industries, including shipbuilding, oil exploration, and mining. His work was particularly influential in Aker thus giving rise to the so-called "Aker school of leadership" in Norway. Kenning received the Knight, First Class Order of St. Olav for his work in Norway.
