= UMass Minutemen ice hockey statistical leaders =

The UMass Minutemen ice hockey statistical leaders are individual statistical leaders of the UMass Minutemen ice hockey program in various categories, including goals, assists, points, and saves. Within those areas, the lists identify single-game, single-season, and career leaders. The Minutemen represent the University of Massachusetts Amherst in the NCAA's Hockey East.

UMass began competing in intercollegiate ice hockey in 1908. These lists are updated through the end of the 2020–21 season.

== Goals ==
Career
Rk	Player	Goals	Seasons
1	Pat Keenan	105	1970–71 1971–72 1972–73
2	Warren Norris	73	1993–94 1994–95 1995–96 1996–97
3	Rob Bonneau	72	1993–94 1994–95 1995–96 1996–97
4	John Leonard	56	2017–18 2018–19 2019–20
5	Michael Pereira	53	2010–11 2011–12 2012–13 2013–14
	Bobby Trivigno	53	2018–19 2019–20 2020–21 2021–22
7	Russell Kidd	50	1953–54 1954–55 1955–56
	Stephen Werner	50	2002–03 2003–04 2004–05 2005–06
9	Greg Mauldin	48	2001–02 2002–03 2003–04
10	Mitchell Chaffee	47	2017–18 2018–19 2019–20
	Tim Turner	47	1999–00 2000–01 2001–02 2002–03

Season
Rk	Player	Goals	Season
1	Pat Keenan	43	1972–73
2	Pat Keenan	34	1970–71
3	Pat Keenan	28	1971–72
4	John Leonard	27	2019–20
5	Rob Bonneau	26	1993–94
6	Charles Glew	24	1961–62
7	Casey Wellman	23	2009–10
	Sal Manganaro	23	1995–96
	Russell Kidd	23	1954–55
10	Cole O'Hara	22	2024–25

Single Game
Rk	Player	Goals	Season	Opponent
1	Russ Kidd	7	1954–55	Worcester Poly-Tech
	Pat Keenan	7	1970–71	Lowell Tech

== Assists ==
Career
Rk	Player	Assists	Seasons
1	James Marcou	96	2007–08 2008–09 2009–10
2	Rob Bonneau	94	1993–94 1994–95 1995–96 1996–97
3	Warren Norris	81	1993–94 1994–95 1995–96 1996–97
4	Bobby Trivigno	78	2018–19 2019–20 2020–21 2021–22
5	Pat Keenan	75	1970–71 1971–72 1972–73
6	Chris Capraro	67	2002–03 2003–04 2005–06 2006–07
	William Harris	67	1972–73 1973–74 1974–75 1975–76
8	Conor Sheary	66	2010–11 2011–12 2012–13 2013–14
	Stephen Werner	66	2002–03 2003–04 2004–05 2005–06
	Scott Morrow	66	2021–22 2022–23 2023–24

Season
Rk	Player	Assists	Season
1	James Marcou	40	2009–10
2	Cale Makar	33	2018–19
3	James Marcou	32	2008–09
4	Jacob Pritchard	31	2018–19
	Rob Bonneau	31	1996–97
6	Rob Bonneau	30	1995–96
7	Bobby Trivigno	29	2021–22
	Cole O'Hara	29	2024–25
9	Pat Keenan	28	1970–71
10	Warren Norris	27	1993–94

Single Game
Rk	Player	Assists	Season	Opponent
1	Ron Pozzo	6	1956–57	Wesleyan

== Points ==
Career
Rk	Player	Points	Seasons
1	Pat Keenan	180	1970–71 1971–72 1972–73
2	Rob Bonneau	166	1993–94 1994–95 1995–96 1996–97
3	Warren Norris	154	1993–94 1994–95 1995–96 1996–97
4	Bobby Trivigno	131	2018–19 2019–20 2020–21 2021–22
5	James Marcou	130	2007–08 2008–09 2009–10
6	Stephen Werner	116	2002–03 2003–04 2004–05 2005–06
7	Michael Pereira	107	2010–11 2011–12 2012–13 2013–14
	Tim Turner	107	1999–00 2000–01 2001–02 2002–03
9	John Leonard	105	2017–18 2018–19 2019–20
10	Conor Sheary	104	2010–11 2011–12 2012–13 2013–14

Season
Rk	Player	Points	Season
1	Pat Keenan	65	1972–73
2	Pat Keenan	59	1971–72
3	Pat Keenan	56	1970–71
4	James Marcou	51	2009–10
	Cole O'Hara	51	2024–25
6	Cale Makar	49	2018–19
	Bobby Trivigno	49	2021–22
8	Jacob Pritchard	47	2018–19
	James Marcou	47	2008–09
	Rob Bonneau	47	1993–94
	Warren Norris	47	1993–94
	Rob Bonneau	47	1996–97

Single Game
Rk	Player	Points	Season	Opponent
1	Russ Kidd	9	1954–55	Worcester Poly-Tech
	Pat Keenan	9	1970–71	Lowell Tech

== Saves ==
Career
Rk	Player	Saves	Seasons
1	Paul Dainton	3226	2007–08 2008–09 2009–10 2010–11
2	Brian Regan	3050	1994–95 1995–96 1996–97 1997–98
3	Matt Murray	2850	2017–18 2018–19 2019–20 2020–21 2021–22
4	Michael Hrabal	2661	2023–24 2024–25 2025–26
5	Gabe Winer	2591	2002–03 2003–04 2004–05 2005–06
6	Markus Helanen	2382	1997–98 1998–99 1999–00 2000–01
7	Steve Mastalerz	1953	2011–12 2012–13 2013–14 2014–15
8	Jonathan Quick	1564	2005–06 2006–07
9	Dana Redmond	1545	1974–75 1975–76 1976–77
10	Mike Johnson	1394	1998–99 1999–00 2000–01 2001–02

Season
Rk	Player	Saves	Season
1	Jonathan Quick	1064	2006–07
2	Michael Hrabal	1028	2024–25
3	Matt Murray	910	2021–22
4	Markus Helanen	885	1998–99
5	Paul Dainton	879	2010–11
6	Paul Dainton	848	2007–08
7	Michael Hrabal	837	2025–26
8	Brian Regan	820	1996–97
9	Brian Regan	809	1997–98
10	Paul Dainton	808	2009–10

Single Game
Rk	Player	Saves	Season	Opponent
1	Gene Demasellis	79	1956–57	AIC
	Ed Sanborn	79	1966–67	New Hampshire
