= List of Northeastern Huskies men's ice hockey seasons =

This is a season-by-season list of records compiled by Northeastern in men's ice hockey.

Northeastern has sponsored varsity ice hockey since 1929 with the exception of a three-year period during World War II.

== Season-by-season results ==
Note: GP = Games played, W = Wins, L = Losses, T = Ties

NCAA D-I Champions	NCAA Frozen Four	Conference regular season champions	Conference Division Champions	Conference Playoff Champions

Season	Conference	Regular season (Note: Code explanation; GP—Games Played, W—Wins, L—Losses, T—Tied games, OTW—Overtime Wins, OTL—Overtime Loses, 3/SW—Win in 3 on 3 overtime or shootout, Pts—Points*)														Conference Tournament Results	National Tournament Results
Season	Conference	Conference									Overall					Conference Tournament Results	National Tournament Results
Season	Conference	GP	W	L	T	OTW	OTL	3/SW	Pts*	Finish	GP	W	L	T	%	Conference Tournament Results	National Tournament Results
H. Nelson Raymond (1929–1936)
1929–30	Independent	–	–	–	–	–	–	–	–	–	7	2	5	0	.286		
1930–31	Independent	–	–	–	–	–	–	–	–	–	11	4	6	1	.409		
1931–32	Independent	–	–	–	–	–	–	–	–	–	7	6	1	0	.857		
1932–33	Independent	–	–	–	–	–	–	–	–	–	8	3	4	1	.438		
1933–34	Independent	–	–	–	–	–	–	–	–	–	10	6	2	2	.700		
1934–35	Independent	–	–	–	–	–	–	–	–	–	8	3	5	0	.375		
1935–36	Independent	–	–	–	–	–	–	–	–	–	8	2	5	1	.313		
Herb Gallagher (1936–1942)
1936–37	Independent	–	–	–	–	–	–	–	–	–	10	6	3	1	.650		
1937–38	Independent	–	–	–	–	–	–	–	–	–	13	3	9	1	.269		
1938–39	Independent	–	–	–	–	–	–	–	–	–	14	8	6	0	.571		
1939–40	Independent	–	–	–	–	–	–	–	–	–	11	7	4	0	.636		
1940–41	Independent	–	–	–	–	–	–	–	–	–	9	6	3	0	.667		
1941–42	Independent	–	–	–	–	–	–	–	–	–	12	7	5	0	.583		
William L. Linskey (1942–1943)
1942–43	Independent	–	–	–	–	–	–	–	–	–	13	7	6	0	.538		
Program suspended due to World War II
Herb Gallagher (1946–1955)
1946–47	Independent	–	–	–	–	–	–	–	–	–	14	5	9	0	.357		
1947–48	Independent	–	–	–	–	–	–	–	–	–	19	10	9	0	.526		
1948–49	Independent	–	–	–	–	–	–	–	–	–	16	9	7	0	.563		
1949–50	Independent	–	–	–	–	–	–	–	–	–	18	7	10	1	.417		
1950–51	Independent	–	–	–	–	–	–	–	–	–	19	8	11	0	.421		
1951–52	Independent	–	–	–	–	–	–	–	–	–	21	11	10	0	.524		
1952–53	Independent	–	–	–	–	–	–	–	–	–	21	9	10	2	.476		
1953–54	Independent	–	–	–	–	–	–	–	–	–	18	5	12	1	.306		
1954–55	Independent	–	–	–	–	–	–	–	–	–	21	7	14	0	.333		
Jim Bell (1955–1970)
1955–56	Independent	–	–	–	–	–	–	–	–	–	25	13	12	0	.520		
1956–57	Independent	–	–	–	–	–	–	–	–	–	25	10	14	1	.420		
1957–58	Independent	–	–	–	–	–	–	–	–	–	26	7	18	1	.288		
1958–59	Independent	–	–	–	–	–	–	–	–	–	23	12	11	0	.522		
1959–50	Independent	–	–	–	–	–	–	–	–	–	24	8	16	0	.333		
1960–61	Independent	–	–	–	–	–	–	–	–	–	26	12	14	0	.462		
1961–62	ECAC Hockey	23	7	16	0	–	–	–	.304	23rd	24	7	17	0	.292		
1962–63	ECAC Hockey	25	9	16	0	–	–	–	.360	20th	26	9	17	0	.346		
1963–64	ECAC Hockey	22	14	8	0	–	–	–	.636	9th	24	14	10	0	.583		
University Division
1964–65	ECAC Hockey	19	11	8	0	–	–	–	.579	6th	28	18	10	0	.643	Lost Quarterfinal, 3–6 (Clarkson)	
1965–66	ECAC Hockey	18	9	8	1	–	–	–	.528	8th	29	16	12	1	.569	Lost Quarterfinal, 1–4 (Boston University)	
1966–67	ECAC Hockey	20	9	11	0	–	–	–	.450	11th	26	12	14	0	.462		
1967–68	ECAC Hockey	17	4	13	0	–	–	–	.235	14th	24	6	17	1	.271		
1968–69	ECAC Hockey	18	4	14	0	–	–	–	.222	15th	23	7	16	0	.304		
1969–70	ECAC Hockey	17	1	16	0	–	–	–	.059	17th	23	3	20	0	.130		
Fernie Flaman (1970–1989)
1970–71	ECAC Hockey	19	3	16	0	–	–	–	.158	16th	29	7	22	0	.241		
1971–72	ECAC Hockey	20	3	17	0	–	–	–	.150	16th	26	6	20	0	.231		
1972–73	ECAC Hockey	21	10	11	0	–	–	–	.476	10th	29	17	12	0	.586		
Division I
1973–74	ECAC Hockey	19	7	10	2	–	–	–	.130	T–11th	27	10	13	4	.444		
1974–75	ECAC Hockey	22	10	11	1	–	–	–	.477	9th	28	15	11	2	.571		
1975–76	ECAC Hockey	23	6	16	1	–	–	–	.283	T–14th	26	9	16	1	.365		
1976–77	ECAC Hockey	22	9	13	0	–	–	–	.409	13th	27	11	16	0	.407		
1977–78	ECAC Hockey	24	7	16	1	–	–	–	.313	15th	28	10	17	1	.375		
1978–79	ECAC Hockey	22	11	11	0	–	–	–	.500	9th	27	12	15	0	.444		
1979–80	ECAC Hockey	21	5	16	0	–	–	–	.238	16th	27	7	20	0	.259		
1980–81	ECAC Hockey	21	12	9	0	–	–	–	.571	T–4th	26	13	13	0	.500	Lost Quarterfinal, 3–5 (Colgate)	
1981–82	ECAC Hockey	21	14	6	1	–	–	–	.690	2nd	36	25	9	2	.722	Won Quarterfinal, 5–3 (St. Lawrence); Won Semifinal, 4–2 (New Hampshire); Won Championship, 5–2 (Harvard)	Won Quarterfinal series, 5–4 (Bowling Green); Lost Semifinal, 2–6 (North Dakota); Won Third-place game, 10–4 (New Hampshire)
1982–83	ECAC Hockey	21	9	11	1	–	–	–	.452	12th	28	13	14	1	.482		
1983–84	ECAC Hockey	21	10	10	1	–	–	–	.500	T–9th	29	16	12	1	.569		
1984–85	Hockey East	34	11	22	1	–	–	–	23	6th	38	13	24	1	.355	Lost Quarterfinal series, 0–2 (Providence)	
1985–86	Hockey East	34	18	14	2	–	–	–	38	3rd	39	20	17	2	.538	Lost Quarterfinal series, 6–7 (Lowell)	
1986–87	Hockey East	32	11	18	3	–	–	–	25	5th	37	13	21	3	.392	Lost Quarterfinal, 2–3 (Boston University)	
1987–88	Hockey East	26	13	9	4	–	–	–	30	2nd	38	21	13	4	.605	Won Semifinal series, 4–3 (Lowell); Won Championship, 4–3 (Maine)	Lost First round series, 8–10 (Merrimack)
1988–89	Hockey East	26	13	11	2	–	–	–	28	T–3rd	36	18	16	2	.528	Won Quarterfinal, 5–4 (OT) (New Hampshire); Lost Semifinal, 2–3 (OT) (Maine); Lost Consolation Game, 2–3 (Providence)	
Don McKenney (1989–1991)
1989–90	Hockey East	21	9	10	2	–	–	–	20	T–5th	37	16	19	2	.459	Lost Quarterfinal series, 1–2 (Boston University)	
1990–91	Hockey East	21	3	16	2	–	–	–	8	8th	35	8	25	2	.257	Won Quarterfinal, 6–5 (Boston College); Lost Semifinal, 3–4 (OT) (Maine)	
Ben Smith (1991–1996)
1991–92	Hockey East	21	7^	14	0	–	–	–	14^	7th	35	16^	19	0	.457^	Lost Quarterfinal, 2–4 (New Hampshire)	
1992–93	Hockey East	24	6	17	1	–	–	–	13	8th	35	10	24	1	.300	Lost Quarterfinal series, 0–2 (Maine)	
1993–94	Hockey East	24	10	8	6	–	–	–	26	4th	39	19	13	7	.577	Won Quarterfinal series, 2–0 (Providence); Lost Semifinal, 2–5 (Boston University); Tied Consolation Game, 4–4 (OT) (New Hampshire)	Lost Regional Quarterfinal, 5–6 (OT) (Lake Superior State)
1994–95	Hockey East	24	11	8	5	–	–	5	70	4th	35	16	14	5	.529	Lost Quarterfinal, 2–5 (Massachusetts–Lowell)	
1995–96	Hockey East	24	6	13	5	–	–	5	45	7th	36	10	21	5	.347	Lost Quarterfinal series, 0–2 (Massachusetts–Lowell)	
Bruce Crowder (1996–2005)
1996–97	Hockey East	24	3	19	2	–	–	–	8	9th	36	8	25	3	.264	Lost Quarterfinal series, 0–2 (Boston University)	
1997–98	Hockey East	24	13	8	3	–	–	–	29	4th	39	21	15	3	.577	Lost Quarterfinal series, 1–2 (Massachusetts–Lowell)	
1998–99	Hockey East	24	6	16	2	–	–	–	14	9th	34	11	20	3	.368		
1999–00	Hockey East	24	8	11	5	–	–	–	21	T–5th	36	12	19	5	.403	Lost Quarterfinal series, 0–2 (Boston College)	
2000–01	Hockey East	24	7	13	4	–	–	–	18	7th	36	13	19	4	.417	Lost Quarterfinal series, 0–2 (Maine)	
2001–02	Hockey East	24	11	11	2	–	–	–	24	5th	39	19	17	3	.526	Lost Quarterfinal series, 1–2 (Massachusetts–Lowell)	
2002–03	Hockey East	24	5	17	2	–	–	–	12	T–8th	34	10	21	3	.338		
2003–04	Hockey East	24	5	13	6	–	–	–	16	9th	34	11	16	7	.426		
2004–05	Hockey East	24	10	10	4	–	–	–	24	6th	38	15	18	5	.461	Lost Quarterfinal series, 0–2 (New Hampshire)	
Greg Cronin (2005–2011)
2005–06	Hockey East	27	3	17	7	–	–	–	13	9th	34	3	24	7	.191		
2006–07	Hockey East	27	9	13	5	–	–	–	23	7th	36	13	18	5	.431	Lost Quarterfinal series, 0–2 (Boston College)	
2007–08	Hockey East	27	12	13	2	–	–	–	26	6th	37	16	18	3	.473	Lost Quarterfinal series, 1–2 (Vermont)	
2008–09	Hockey East	27	18	6	3	–	–	–	39	2nd	41	25	12	4	.659	Won Quarterfinal series, 2–1 (Massachusetts); Lost Semifinal, 2–3 (OT) (Massachusetts–Lowell)	Lost Regional Quarterfinal, 2–3 (Cornell)
2009–10	Hockey East	27	11	14	2	–	–	–	24	9th	34	16	16	2	.500		
2010–11	Hockey East	27	10	10	7	–	–	–	27	6th	38	14	16	8	.474	Won Quarterfinal series, 2–1 (Boston University); Lost Semifinal, 4–5 (Boston College)	
Jim Madigan (2011–2021)
2011–12	Hockey East	27	9	14	4	–	–	–	22	T–8th	34	13	16	5	.456		
2012–13	Hockey East	27	5	18	4	–	–	–	14	10th	34	9	21	4	.324		
2013–14	Hockey East	20	10	8	2	–	–	–	22	T–4th	37	19	14	4	.568	Lost Quarterfinal series, 1–2 (New Hampshire)	
2014–15	Hockey East	22	11	9	2	–	–	–	24	6th	36	16	16	4	.500	Lost Opening Round series, 0–2 (Merrimack)	
2015–16	Hockey East	22	10	8	4	–	–	–	28	6th	41	22	14	5	.598	Won Opening Round series, 2–0 (Maine); Won Quarterfinal series, 2–0 (Notre Dame); Won Semifinal, 5–4 (Boston College); Won Championship, 3–2 (Massachusetts–Lowell)	Lost Regional semifinal, 2–6 (North Dakota)
2016–17	Hockey East	22	9	10	3	–	–	–	21	8th	38	18	15	5	.539	Won Opening Round series, 2–0 (Connecticut); Lost Quarterfinal series, 0–2 (Boston University)	
2017–18	Hockey East	24	15	6	3	–	–	–	33	2nd	38	23	10	5	.671	Won Quarterfinal series, 2–0 (Massachusetts); Lost Semifinal, 2–3 (OT) (Providence)	Lost Regional semifinal, 2–3 (Michigan)
2018–19	Hockey East	24	15	8	1	–	–	–	31	T–2nd	39	27	11	1	.705	Won Quarterfinal series, 2–0 (Maine); Won Semifinal, 2–1 (OT) (Boston University); Won Championship, 3–2 (Boston College)	Lost Regional semifinal, 1–5 (Cornell)
2019–20	Hockey East	24	11	12	1	–	–	–	23	T–7th	34	18	13	3	.574	Tournament cancelled	
2020–21	Hockey East	20	9	8	3	1	0	3	.533	6th	21	9	9	3	.500	Lost Quarterfinal, 1–4 (Massachusetts)	
Jerry Keefe (2021–Present)
2021–22	Hockey East	24	15	8	1	1	1	1	47	1st	39	25	13	1	.654	Won Quarterfinal, 3–2 (Boston College); Lost Semifinal, 4–1 (Connecticut)	Lost Regional semifinal, 1-2 (OT) (Western Michigan)
2022–23	Hockey East	24	14	7	3	0	2	2	49	3rd	35	17	13	5	.557	Lost Quarterfinal, 1–2 (OT) (Providence)	
2023–24	Hockey East	24	9	14	1	1	3	0	30	7th	36	17	16	3	.514	Won First Round, 4–0 (Merrimack); Lost Quarterfinal, 2–4 (Boston University)	
2024–25	Hockey East	24	7	14	3	1	1	2	26	9th	37	14	20	3	.419	Won First Round, 3–2 (2OT) (Merrimack); Won Quarterfinal, 3–1 (Boston College); Lost Semifinal, 3–4 (2OT) (Maine)	
2025–26	Hockey East	24	11	13	0	1	1	2	35	6th	36	17	18	1	.486	Won First Round, 7–3 (New Hampshire); Lost Quarterfinal, 4–1 (Umass)	
Totals											GP	W	L	T	%	Championships	
Regular season											2459	1059	1225	175	.466	1 Hockey East Championship	
Conference Post-season											91	38	52	1	.423	1 ECAC Hockey tournament championships, 3 Hockey East tournament championships	
NCAA Post-season											12	3	8	1	.292	8 NCAA Tournament appearances	
Regular season and Post-season Record											2562	1100	1285	177	.464		

* Winning percentage is used when conference schedules are unbalanced.
^ Maine was forced to forfeit 13 games after the season for using an ineligible player.
