= Northeastern Huskies men's soccer =

American college soccer team

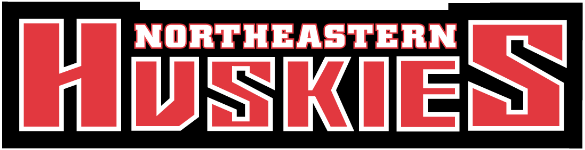
- Founded: 1984; 41 years ago
- University: Northeastern University
- Head coach: Jeremy Bonomo (2nd season)
- Conference: CAA
- Location: Boston, Massachusetts, US
- Stadium: Parsons Field (capacity: 7,000)
- Nickname: Huskies
- Colors: Red and black
Home	Away

NCAA tournament appearances
- 2002, 2012

Conference tournament championships
- 2012

Conference regular season championships
- 2000, 2002

The Northeastern Huskies men's soccer is an intercollegiate varsity sports team of Northeastern University in NCAA Division I college soccer, located in Boston, Massachusetts. The team competes in the Colonial Athletic Association and plays its home matches at Parsons Field, a 7,000-seat multi-purpose stadium in Brookline, Massachusetts. The facilities include two multipurpose weight and cardio rooms in the Cabot Center and Matthews Arena.

The Huskies are currently led by head coach Jeremy Bonomo, who took the position in February 2024 after serving as a head coach at the University of Wisconsin-Green Bay. The team has an all-time record 290–393–91 (.433) through October 30, 2026. The Huskies have made two appearances in the NCAA tournament with a combined record of 2–2-1, in 2002 and 2012.

== Head coaches ==
Tenure	Coach	Years	Record	Pct.
1984–1986	Winston Smith	3	14–54–2	.214
1987–1990	Keith Cammidge	4	17–36–1	.324
1991–1995	Turi Lonero	5	39–51–1	.434
1996–2004	Ed Matz	9	83–74–18	.526
2005–2015	Brian Ainscough	11	82–92–35	.476
2016–2021	Chris Gbandi	6	32–52–10	.394
2022–2023	Rich Weinrebe	2	10–16–9	.414
2024–present	Jeremy Bonomo	3	13-19-15	.436

== Current technical staff ==
Position	Name	Consecutive season at Northeastern in current position
Athletic director	(Canada) Jim Madigan	6th
Head coach	(United States) Jeremy Bonomo	3rd
Assistant coaches	(Democratic Republic of the Congo) John Manga	2nd
Assistant coaches	(United States) Jordan Koduah	2nd
Goalkeepers coach	(United States) William Levitsky	2nd
Athletic trainer	(United States) Andre Figueroa	3rd

Last updated: February 26, 2026

== Current squad ==
As of July 14, 2026

Note: Flags indicate national team as defined under FIFA eligibility rules; some limited exceptions apply. Players may hold more than one non-FIFA nationality.

No.	Pos.	Nation	Player
0	GK	USA	Guthrie Kalotay-Nemec
1	GK	GER	Bennet Starcke
2	DF	CAN	Rohin Kapila
4	DF	USA	Ethan Leary
5	DF	USA	Marcus Cooper
6	DF	USA	Jaden Prado
7	MF	USA	Kortay Koc
8	MF	GER	Julius Rüger
9	FW	USA	Shai Saarony
10	MF	CAN	Ethan Kang
11	FW	USA	Bryce Flowers
12	MF	USA	Uba Ibeanu
13	MF	USA	Richard Conces
15	MF	USA	Derian Berisha

No.	Pos.	Nation	Player
16	MF	USA	Will Schmidt
17	MF	USA	Asiah Carroll
19	FW	USA	Julian Blalock
20	MF	USA	Joaquin Villarreal
22	MF	USA	Ignacio Doglioli
24	DF	USA	Ethan Davis
25	DF	USA	Gus Mendieta
28	MF	USA	Anthony Rapo
29	DF	GER	Christoph Schurz
30	DF	USA	Matty Gardner
31	GK	USA	Brady Elmblad
32	MF	USA	Tate Duax
33	GK	USA	Sergey Balatsko

== Colors and badge ==
The team uses the school colors of Red, Black, and White.

== Record by year ==
Conference Regular Season Champions^{†}	Conference Tournament Champions^{‡}	Conference Regular Season & Tournament Champions^{♦}

Season	Conference	Head coach	Season Results			Postseason result
Season	Conference	Head coach	Overall	Conference	Conf. standings	Postseason result
1984	Independent	Winston Smith	4–11–0			
1985	Independent	Winston Smith	3–14–2			
1986	Independent	Winston Smith	2–17–0			
1987	Independent	Winston Smith	5–12–0			
1988	America East	Keith Cammid	4–14–0	0–5–0	6th	No Conference Tournament
1989	America East	Keith Cammid	3–15–0	0–5–0	6th	
1990	America East	Keith Cammid	10–7–1	1–4–0	5th	
1991	America East	Turi Lonero	4–16–0	0–7–0	8th	
1992	America East	Turi Lonero	7–11–0	1–6–0	7th	
1993	America East	Turi Lonero	10–8–0	3–4–0	6th	
1994	America East	Turi Lonero	7–10–1	2–5–0	6th	
1995	America East	Turi Lonero	11–6–0	5–4–0	7th	
1996	America East	Ed Matz	12–5–2	6–1–2	2nd	
1997	America East	Ed Matz	5–11–2	3–4–2	5th	
1998	America East	Ed Matz	7–11–0	1–8–0	10th	
1999	America East	Ed Matz	11–6–2	5–2–2	3rd	
2000†	America East	Ed Matz	10–8–0	7–2–0	1st	
2001	America East	Ed Matz	13–8–0	7–4–0	4th	
2002♦	America East	Ed Matz	12–8–4	6–2–0	1st	NCAA Tournament Berth(2nd Round)/American East Tournament(Vice Champion)
2003	America East	Ed Matz	10–7–4	4–4–1	5th	
2004	America East	Ed Matz	3–10–4	2–4–3	8th	
America East Total:			139–161–20	53–71–10		
2005	Colonia Athletic Association	Brian Ainscough	3–9–6	2–4–5		
2006	Colonia Athletic Association	Brian Ainscough	8–10–2	6–4–1	5th	CAA Tournament(1st Round)
2007	Colonia Athletic Association	Brian Ainscough	8–10–1	6–4–1	6th	CAA Tournament(1st Round)
2008	Colonia Athletic Association	Brian Ainscough	7–5–9	5–2–4	5th	CAA Tournament(Vice-Champion)
2009	Colonia Athletic Association	Brian Ainscough	10–8–1	8–2–1	3rd	CAA Tournament(Vice-Champion)
2010	Colonia Athletic Association	Brian Ainscough	5–9–3	3–5–3	10th	
2011	Colonia Athletic Association	Brian Ainscough	10–6–3	6–4–1	5th	CAA Tournament(1st Round)
2012‡	Colonia Athletic Association	Brian Ainscough	14–3–4	6–1–3	2nd	NCAA Tournament Berth(2nd Round)/CAA Tournament(Champion)
2013	Colonia Athletic Association	Brian Ainscough	6–9–3	3–3–1	5th	CAA Tournament(1st Round)
2014	Colonia Athletic Association	Brian Ainscough	8–11–1	4–3–1	5th	CAA Tournament(Semifinalist)
2015	Colonia Athletic Association	Brian Ainscough	3–12–2	2–6–0	8th	
2016	Colonia Athletic Association	Chris Gbandi	6–11–0	3–5–0	8th	
2017	Colonia Athletic Association	Chris Gbandi	3–12–3	1–6–1	8th	
2018	Colonia Athletic Association	Chris Gbandi	6–9–1	3–4–1	6th	CAA Tournament(1st Round)
2019	Colonia Athletic Association	Chris Gbandi	6–9–3	3–3–2	5th	CAA Tournament(1st Round)
2020	Colonia Athletic Association	Chris Gbandi	0-5-1	0-3-1	9th	
2021	Colonia Athletic Association	Chris Gbandi	11–6–2	5–2–1	2nd	CAA Tournament(1st Round)
2022	Colonia Athletic Association	Rich Weinrebe	6–9–3	4–4–1	4th	CAA Tournament(1st Round)
2023	Colonia Athletic Association	Rich Weinrebe	4–7–6	1–4–3	10th	
2024	Colonia Athletic Association	Jeremy Bonomo	4-5-7	2–4–2	9th	Missed playoffs
2025	Colonia Athletic Association	Jeremy Bonomo	4-7-4	2-5-1	5th(North)	Missed playoffs
2026	Colonia Athletic Association	Jeremy Bonomo	5-7-4	2-4-2	4th(North)	Missed playoffs
CAA Total:			137-179-69	77-82-36		

== Postseason ==
=== NCAA Tournament ===
Northeastern University’s men’s soccer team has made two NCAA Tournament appearances. The Huskies first qualified in 2002 and most recently returned in 2012. Across the past 40 years, they have advanced to the Round of 32 twice.

== Honors ==
- America East Regular Season
  - Winners (2): 2000, 2002
- Colonial Athletic Association Tournament
  - Winners (1): 2012

== CAA League honors ==
Northeastern played soccer as a member of the America East Conference from 1988 to 2004. Northeastern plays soccer as a member of the Coastal Athletic Association from 2005 to present.

- All-CAA Rookie Team

Year	Player
2021	Andres Torrealba, M
2005	Andrew Konopelsky, M
2001	Antha Kirkopoulos, M
2009	Don Anding, F
2003	Daniel Ivec, M
2002	David Downing, F
2012	Donovan Fayd'Herbe de Maudave, F
2024	Ethan Kang, M
2006	FLars Okland, M
2010	Laurence Braude, M
2007	Matt Sanford, D
2008	Mike Kennedy, M
2000	Oumar Thiam, M
2013	Robbie Schallmo, M
2018	Ryan Massoud, F
2022	Sami Baiche, M
2021	Sebastian Restrepo, F
2002	Sergio Saccoccio, GK
2012	Terence Carter, F
2023	Thomas Vold, M
2019	Timothy Ennin, F
2002	Tom Heimreid, M

- All-CAA Team Selections

Year	First team
2000	Anders Høyem, M
2001	Anders Høyem, M
1996	Andrew Boyea, GK
2002	Andrew Konopelsky, M
1995	Bjorn Hansen, M
1996	Bjorn Hansen, M
2011	Dante Marini, M
2013	Dante Marini, M
2009	Don Anding, F
2012	Don Anding, F
2021	Federico Tellez, M
2023	Federico Tellez, M
2015	Frantzdy Pierrot, F
2006	Greg Kilkenny, F
2007	Greg Kilkenny, F
2007	Lars Okland, M
2008	Lars Okland, M
2012	Oliver Blum, GK
1999	Petter Starnas, F
2009	Santiago Bedoya, D
2012	Simon Cox, D
2013	Simon Cox, D

Year	Second team
1997	Albert Numlér, M
1999	Anders Høyem, M
2019	Benjamin Klingen, F
2020	Benjamin Klingen, F
2021	Benjamin Klingen, F
1999	Brendan Faherty, M
2012	Dante Marini, M
2022	Federico Tellez, M
2014	Frantzdy Pierrot, F
1996	Glen Jusczyk, M
2017	Harry Swartz, F
2018	Harry Swartz, F
1995	Heiko Ross, D
2013	Jonathan Eckford, M
2009	Lars Okland, M
2018	Martin Nygaard, D
2010	Matt Sanford, D
2010	Mike Kennedy, F
1995	Nils Aass, M
2002	Oumar Thiam, M
2003	Oumar Thiam, M
2000	Petter Starnas, F
2001	Petter Starnas, F
2010	Santiago Bedoya, D
2005	Sergio Saccoccio, GK
2014	Simon Cox, D
2004	Tom Heimreid, M
2001	Trond Olsen, F

Year	Third team
2007	Alexander Volk, M
2014	Brad Fountain, M
2021	Colby Hegarty, GK
2012	Jonathan Eckford, M
2008	Mike Kennedy, F
2009	Mike Kennedy, F
2011	Mike Kennedy, F
2018	Moustapha Samb, D
2011	Ryan Burnham, D
2019	Ryan Massoud, M
2020	Ryan Massoud, M
2023	Thomas Vold, M
2019	Timothy Ennin, F
2020	Timothy Ennin, F
2021	Timothy Ennin, F
2025	Tobias Jahn, GK

== Individuals honors ==
=== Top Drawer Soccer Freshman (Top 100) ===
Ethan Leary, D, 2024

=== United Soccer Coaches Scholar All-America ===
Year	Player
2000	Anders Høyem, M
2021	Anders Høyem, M

=== MAC Hermann Trophy (Semifinalist) ===
Don Anding, F, 2012

=== United Soccer Coaches All-Atlantic Region (Second team) ===
Year	Player
2021	Federico Tellez, M
2023	Federico Tellez, M

=== United Soccer Coaches All-America ===
Year	Player
1996	Bjorn Hansen, M
2012	Don Anding, F

=== Players of the Year (American EAst/CAA) ===
Year	Player
1995	Bjorn Hansen, M
2002	Antha Kirkopoulos, M
2012	Don Anding, F

=== Coaches of the Year (American East/CAA) ===
Year	Coach
1990	Keith Cammidge
2000	Ed Matz
2002	Ed Matz
2012	Brian Ainscough

== Notable players ==
This list of former players includes those who received international caps, made significant contributions to the team in terms of appearances or goals, or who made significant contributions to the sport after they left. It is clearly not yet complete and all inclusive, and additions and refinements will continue to be made over time.

- (Poland) Andrew Konopelsky (1987)
- (United States) Santiago Bodoya (1989)
- (Thailand) Top Phatarapraist (1989)
- (The Bahamas) Ambry Moss (1990)
- (United States) Don Anding (1991)
- (United States) Dante Marini (1992)
- (England) Simon Cox (1993)
- (Haiti) Frantzdy Pierrot (1995)
- (Norway) Martin Nygaard (1995)
- (United States) Harry Swartz (1996)
- (Jamaica) Khori Bennett (1997)
- (Senegal) Moustapha Samb (1997)
- (United States) Adam Gostomelsky (1998)
- (Germany) Benjamin Klingen (1998)
- (England) Noah Abrams (1998)
- (United States) Grant Elgin (1999)
- (Denmark) Sören Ilsöe (1999)
- (Canada) Ryan Massoud (2000)
- (Ghana) Timothy Ennin (2000)
- (United States) Federico Tellez (2001)
- (Sweden) Sami Baiche (2002)
- (Italy) Vincent Rinaldi (2007)
