= Northeastern Huskies =

Intercollegiate sports teams of Northeastern University

- University: Northeastern University
- Nickname: Huskies
- NCAA: Division I
- Conference: Coastal Athletic Association; Hockey East; EARC (men's rowing)
- Athletic director: Jim Madigan
- Location: Boston, Massachusetts
- Varsity teams: 16
- Basketball arena: Cabot Center
- Ice hockey arena: Various
- Baseball stadium: Friedman Diamond
- Soccer stadium: Parsons Field
- Aquatics center: Barletta Natatorium
- Colors: Red and black
- Mascot: Paws
- Fight song: All Hail Northeastern
- Website: nuhuskies.com
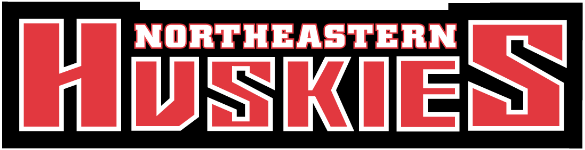

Coastal Athletic Association logo in Northeastern's colors

The Northeastern Huskies are the athletic teams representing Northeastern University in Boston, Massachusetts. They compete in thirteen varsity team sports: men's and women's hockey (in Hockey East); men's baseball, men's and women's basketball, women's field hockey and volleyball, swimming, and men's and women's soccer (in the Coastal Athletic Association), and men's and women's rowing, track and cross-country.

The NU mascot is Paws. The school colors are red and black with white trim. The fight song, "All Hail, Northeastern," was composed by Charles A. Pethybridge, Class of 1932.

While Northeastern has won numerous conference championships, they have not won a team national championship. As of 2021, Northeastern has only had a team make it to a national championship game on one occurrence; the women's hockey team made it to the national championship game in 2021, but lost 2–1 in overtime to the Wisconsin Badgers.

Northeastern's sole individual NCAA Champion was Boris Djerassi, who won the 1975 NCAA Championship in the hammer throw.

Principal athletic facilities include Parsons Field (3,000 for baseball), Cabot Center (1,800 for basketball and volleyball), Barletta Natatorium (500), the Reggie Lewis Track and Athletic Center (3,500) and the Henderson Boathouse. Matthews Arena (ice hockey and men's basketball) had been another major facility until its December 2025 closure and subsequent demolition, with a new arena planned to open on the site in 2028.

== Sports sponsored ==
Men's sports	Women's sports
Baseball	Basketball
Basketball	Cross country
Cross country	Field hockey
Ice hockey	Ice hockey
Rowing	Rowing
Soccer	Soccer
Track & field^{†}	Swimming & diving
	Track & field^{†}
	Volleyball
† – Track and field includes both indoor and outdoor

=== Hockey ===
==== Men's hockey ====
The men's ice hockey program has existed since 1929 and played as an independent NCAA Division I team until joining the ECAC in 1961. Northeastern is a founding member of the Hockey East athletic conference, which the team joined in 1984. The Huskies' men's hockey team has generally met with mediocre success. The Huskies had their most success in the 1980s, when the team won the prestigious Beanpot tournament four times (1980, 1984, 1985, and 1988) and was the runner-up twice (1983 and 1987). Its best season came in 1982, when the Huskies finished 25-9-2 and made it to the NCAA Frozen Four. They also won the Hockey East championship in 1988 and 2016 and made appearances in the NCAA hockey tournament in 1988, 1994, 2009, 2016, and 2018. The Huskies also managed to win back-to-back Beanpot tournaments in 2018 and 2019, after ending a 30-year-long title drought.

The program's most notable coach was ex-Boston Bruin and Hockey Hall of Famer Fernie Flaman, who was the head coach between 1970 and 1989. The team's current coach is Jim Madigan, a Northeastern alumni who was part of the Beanpot championship teams from 1983–1985. Madigan succeeded former New York Islanders' farm system coach Greg Cronin, who coached the Huskies from 2005–2011 and finished with a record of 84-104-29, before moving on to become assistant coach of the Toronto Maple Leafs. His best season on St. Botolph Street was the 2008–09 season, when the Huskies had their best record in a generation, finishing 25-12-4 and making the NCAA tournament, as well as being ranked at one point during the season 2nd in the nation, Northeastern's highest national ranking ever in any men's team sport.

Northeastern players who have gone on to significant professional hockey careers have included David Poile '71, long time general manager of the NHL Washington Capitals and current general manager of the NHL Nashville Predators, St. Louis Blues goaltender and two-time All-American Bruce Racine '88, NHL defenseman Dan McGillis, Montreal Canadiens winger Chris Nilan, and Chicago Blackhawks defenseman and Hobey Baker Award finalist Jim Fahey '02. Michael Ryan '02 is a retired forward for Assat in the Finnish League. Joe Vitale '09 is a retired forward for the Arizona Coyotes and Cleveland Monsters goalie and Hobey Baker Award finalist Brad Thiessen '09. Jamie Oleksiak '11 was drafted in the 1st round 14th overall by the Dallas Stars (the highest any Husky has ever been drafted), and currently plays for the Pittsburgh Penguins. Zach Aston-Reese '17 was a finalist for the Hobey Baker Award in 2017 and currently plays for the Toronto Maple Leafs. Adam Gaudette '18 won the Hobey Baker Award in 2018 and currently plays for the Vancouver Canucks. Matt Benning '16 plays defense for Edmonton Oilers, Dylan Sikura '18 plays for the Chicago Blackhawks, Kevin Roy '16 and Josh Manson '14 play for the Anaheim Ducks and Anthony Bitetto '12 plays defense for the Nashville Predators.

==== Women's hockey ====
The women's varsity hockey program started in 1980, and under former World Hockey Association all-star goaltender Don McLeod, who was named the coach the following season and led the program for ten seasons, became the first national power in collegiate women's hockey. Starting in the 1982 season, the lady Huskies had thirteen consecutive winning seasons, including six straight seasons of twenty or more wins between 1987 and 1992.

The program's best record was in 1988, when the undefeated squad finished 26-0-1, winning its first of three ECAC titles (the others coming in 1989 and 1997), at the time the effective national women's college championship. Northeastern has also been the ECAC finalist seven times, as well as winning fourteen women's Beanpot tournaments, including eight straight between 1984 and 1991. The Huskies' all-time best mark for wins was in 1997 with 27, a total equaled in 1992.

The program's career scoring leader is Kendall Coyne with 141 goals and 108 assists for 249 points, while Fiona Rice is the career assists leader with 118. The single-season goal leader is Vicky Sunohara with 51 goals in 1986 and points leader Kendall Coyne with 84 in 2016.

Among notable players for Northeastern have been Sunohara; goaltender Kelly Dyer, the second woman to play professional ice hockey in North America; United States national team goaltender Chanda Gunn, ten-time United States national team member and Olympic gold medalist Shelley Looney, 2002 collegiate women's player of the year Brooke Whitney and multiple Olympic medalist Laura Schuler, Swiss national team goaltender and 2012 First-Team All-American Florence Schelling, and Patty Kazmaier Award winner and Olympian Kendall Coyne.

In addition, the following Huskies have played on the United States national team: Tina Cardinale, Jeanine Sobek, Brooke White-Lancette, Kim Haman, Hillary Witt and Erika Silva.

=== Basketball ===
==== Men's basketball ====
Northeastern is currently a member of the Coastal Athletic Association, having moved to the CAA in 2005 after many years in the America East Conference. The current men's basketball coach is Bill Coen.

The Huskies won the CAA tournament in 2015 and made the NCAA tournament falling to Notre Dame Fighting Irish in the first round.

Among notable players for Northeastern have been Boston Celtics captain and All-Star Reggie Lewis, Golden State Warriors guard Perry Moss, Olympian Dave Caligaris, All-American Pete Harris, Dallas Mavericks guard & NBA Champion José Juan Barea, one of the NCAA's assist leaders & Providence Associate Head Coach Andre LaFleur, and Baskonia guard Matt Janning.

==== Women's basketball ====
Northeastern women's basketball is currently a member of the Coastal Athletic Association, having moved to the CAA in 2005 after many years in the America East Conference, formerly the Seaboard Conference. The current head coach is Kelly Cole.

The women's basketball program began with the 1966–67 season and has produced four conference championships, three with the Seaboard Conference in 1985, 1986, 1987 and one with America East in 1999. The Huskies appeared in the NCAA tournament in 1999 as a #13 seed, losing to #4 North Carolina in the first round.

=== Baseball ===
The Northeastern University Baseball team currently competes in the Coastal Athletic Association and is coached by Mike Glavine.

As a part of the America East Conference from 1979–2005, the baseball program won three America East Conference baseball tournaments, in 1994, 1997, and 2003. The Huskies made the NCAA tournament in 2018 and 2023

Among notable players for Northeastern have been New York Mets pitcher Adam Ottavino, Tampa Bay Rays first baseman Carlos Peña, New York Mets first baseman Mike Glavine, San Francisco Giants third baseman Johnny Tobin and Chicago White Sox infielder Wild Bill Hunnefield. The Huskies appeared in the 1966 College World Series. The team has played the Boston Red Sox in Spring training exhibition games.

=== Soccer ===
==== Men's soccer ====
The Northeastern Men's Soccer team began at the university as a varsity sport in 1984 under the direction of Winston Smith. The team joined America East for the 1988 season and moved to the Colonial Athletic Association for the 2005 season. The team enjoyed their most successful season in 2012, winning the conference championship and moving on to the second round of the NCAA Championships. The team is currently coached by Jeremy Bonomo.

==== Women's soccer ====
The Northeastern Women's Soccer team began at the university as a varsity sport in 1996 under the direction of Julia Claudio and began competing in the America East Conference the following year. The team joined the Colonial Athletic Association in 2005 and won the conference championship in 2008 before advancing to the second round of the NCAA tournament that same year. The team also won the CAA title and advanced to the NCAA tournament in both 2013 and 2014. The Huskies are currently coached by Tracey Leone.

=== Rowing ===
==== Men's rowing ====
The Northeastern Men's Rowing team has a long history at the university, debuting in the 1960s and making a number of appearances at the Eastern Sprints and National IRA Regatta. The team is currently coached by John Pojednic, who joined the team in 1999 as assistant coach and was elevated to head coach following the retirement of Walter “Buzz” Congram in 2000.

==== Women's rowing ====
The Northeastern women's rowing team is currently coached by Joe Wilhelm who was named to the position in 1998. The team made four consecutive appearances in the NCAA Championships (1997 to 2000) as well as a number of appearances at the Eastern Sprints and CAA championships in 2009, 2011, 2012, 2014, and 2015.

=== Track and field ===
The Northeastern Track and Field team has a long history at Northeastern. The team is currently led by Tramaine Shaw who serves as the Director of Track & Field and Cross Country. The team is a member of the Colonial Athletic Association, joining the conference in 2006 after a number of years in America East Conference.

Among notable alumni for Northeastern have been NCAA Champion and Olympian Boris Djerassi as well as Olympian Bruce Bickford.

=== Swimming and diving ===
The swimming and Diving team debuted in the fall of 1978 under Janet Swanson. The team is currently coached by Roy Coates and competes in the Colonial Athletic Association.

=== Football ===
The Huskies football program competed in the NCAA Division I Football Championship Subdivision (FCS) and were members of CAA Football, the technically separate football arm of the Coastal Athletic Association (known before 2023 as Colonial Athletic Association). Northeastern participated in football from 1933 to 2009, compiling an all-time record of 289–366–17.

The Board of Trustees voted on November 20, 2009, to end the football program, citing sparse attendance, numerous losing seasons, and the expense to renovate Parsons Field stadium to an acceptable standard. According to president Joseph E. Aoun, "Leadership requires that we make these choices. This decision allows us to focus on our existing athletic programs."

Among notable players for Northeastern were Cincinnati Bengals tight end and Pro Bowler Dan Ross; Green Bay Packers lineman and Pro Bowler Sean Jones; Miami Dolphins, Baltimore Ravens, and Arizona Cardinals lineman Jerome Daniels Sr., Pittsburgh Steelers lineman Keith Willis and Pittsburgh Steelers linebacker Darin Jordan.

== Club sports ==
The Club Sports Program at Northeastern University, administered by the Campus Recreation department, includes over 40 club sports.

The club sports programs include:

- Alpine Skiing
- Baseball
- Basketball
- Cheerleading
- Climbing
- Color Guard
- Cricket
- Cycling
- Dance
- Field Hockey
- Figure Skating
- Golf
- Ice Hockey – Men
- Ice Hockey – Women
- Inline Hockey
- Lacrosse – Men
- Lacrosse – Women
- Martial Arts – Judo
- Paintball
- Powerlifting
- Rugby – Men's
- Rugby – Women's
- Running
- Sailing – Co-ed
- Sailing – Women's
- Skeet & Trap (Shotgun Shooting)
- Soccer – Men's
- Soccer – Women's
- Softball
- Squash – Men's
- Squash – Women's
- Swimming – Men's
- Swimming – Women's
- Synchronized Skating
- Table Tennis
- Tennis – Men's
- Tennis – Women's
- Triathlon
- Ultimate Frisbee – Men's
- Ultimate Frisbee – Women's
- Volleyball – Men's
- Volleyball – Women's
- Water Polo
- Weightlifting
- Wrestling

=== Sailing ===
The Northeastern University Sailing Team was established in 1940, making it one of the oldest college sailing teams in the country. It is composed of a Co-ed and Women's team, that both compete at the D1 level in the New England Intercollegiate Sailing Association (NEISA), one of the seven conferences affiliated with the Inter-Collegiate Sailing Association (ICSA). In the Fall 2017 season, the Sailing team qualified for the New England Match Race Championship and the Women’s Atlantic Coast Championship, both firsts in the team’s history. In this same season, the Women's team was ranked 15th in the country by the Sailing World Coaches' poll.

=== Alpine skiing ===
The Huskies ski team is a United States Collegiate Ski and Snowboard Association (USCSA) alpine skiing program started in 1971 that competes as a member of the Thompson Division in the Eastern Collegiate Ski Conference (ECSC). Sweeping both the men's and women's division championships in 2014, the ski team placed 5th and 4th [respectively] in the ECSC regionals to advance to their first team appearance at the USCSA National Championships.

=== Climbing ===
The Northeastern club climbing team was founded in the spring of 2014. In the 2014 collegiate season, the team won the New England Regional Championship and placed 2nd in the USA Climbing Collegiate Climbing Series National Championships. At the 2015 National Championships, the team placed 1st in speed climbing and 5th overall.

=== Rugby ===
Founded in 1984, the Northeastern University Rugby Football Club plays college rugby in the East Coast Rugby Conference. Northeastern won the 2012 East Coast 7s Championship to qualify for the 2012 USA Rugby College 7s National Championship. The Huskies competed at the 2014 Collegiate Rugby Championship, a tournament broadcast live on NBC from PPL Park in Philadelphia.

=== Lacrosse ===
The Northeastern men's lacrosse team, founded in 1983, competes in the MCLA's Pioneer Collegiate Lacrosse League. Major in-conference rivals for the Huskies include UConn and Boston College. Recent successes include national tournament trips in 2005, 2007, 2014, and 2017.

=== Squash ===
The Northeastern men's squash team, founded in 2004, competes in the College Squash Association. Major rivals for the Huskies include Tufts, Boston College, Boston University and MIT. Recent successes include the Chaffee Cup Championship in 2006 and 2014. The Huskies won the Serues Cup in 2016. They were the top club team in the country in 2008 with a ranking of 20th.

=== Wrestling ===
The Northeastern men's and women’s wrestling team, founded in 2002, competes in the Northeast division of the NCWA. Major rivals for the Huskies include STCC, University of New Hampshire, Fordham University and MIT. Recent successes include the 2023 Northeast Conference champions in the Women’s division and third place in the 2022 Northeast Conference Men’s division.

== Conference championships ==
Men's conference championships

- Baseball (2): 2004, 2005 – Tournament (3): 1994, 1997, 2003
- Basketball (11): 1981, 1982, 1984, 1985, 1986, 1987, 1990, 1991, 2013, 2015, 2018 – Tournament (9): 1981, 1982, 1984, 1985, 1986, 1987, 1991, 2015, 2019
- Hockey (1): 1982 – Tournament (4): 1982, 1988, 2016, 2019
- Football (1): 2002
- Soccer (2): 2000, 2002 – Tournament (2): 2002, 2012
- Indoor Track & Field (10): 1989, 1990, 1991, 1992, 1994, 1996, 2000, 2001, 2002, 2005
- Outdoor Track & Field (8): 1989, 1990, 1991, 1992, 2001, 2002, 2004, 2015
- Cross Country (1): 1988

Women's conference championships

- Basketball (3): 1985, 1986, 1987 – Tournament (4): 1985, 1986, 1987, 1999
- Hockey (2): 2012, 2019 – Tournament (5): 1988, 1989, 1997, 2018, 2019
- Soccer (2): 2009, 2014 – Tournament (3): 2008, 2013, 2014
- Volleyball (3): 1991, 1992, 2008 – Tournament (1): 2001
- Field Hockey (7): 1995, 1997, 1998, 2001, 2002, 2003, 2014 – Tournament (10): 1990, 1992, 1994, 1995, 1996, 1997, 2001, 2002, 2003, 2004
- Indoor Track & Field (8): 1993, 1994, 1995, 1996, 1998, 2003, 2004, 2005
- Outdoor Track & Field (13): 1991, 1992, 1994, 1995, 1996, 1997, 1998, 1999, 2002, 2003, 2004, 2005, 2007
- Swimming & Diving (6): 1993, 2000, 2001, 2002, 2003, 2004
