= 2019–20 Boston University Terriers men's ice hockey season =

- Conference: 6th Hockey East
- Home ice: Agganis Arena

Rankings
- USCHO.com: NR
- USA Today/ US Hockey Magazine: NR

Record
- Overall: 13–13–8
- Conference: 10–9–5
- Home: 8–6–3
- Road: 5–6–3
- Neutral: 0–1–2

Coaches and captains
- Head coach: Albie O'Connell
- Assistant coaches: Paul Pearl; Len Quesnelle; Brian Eklund
- Captain: Patrick Curry
- Alternate captain(s): Patrick Harper; Cam Crotty; Logan Cockerill

The 2019-20 Boston University Terriers Men's ice hockey season was the 98th season of play for the program and the 36th season in the Hockey East conference. The Terriers represented Boston University and were coached by Albie O'Connell, in his 2nd season.

The Hockey East tournament as well as the NCAA Tournament were cancelled due to the COVID-19 pandemic before any games were played.

== Roster ==
As of December 7, 2019.

No.	Nat.	Player	Class	Pos	Height	Weight	DoB	Hometown	Previous team	NHL rights
1	(United States)	Nico Lynch	Senior	G	5' 11" (1.8 m)	165 lb (75 kg)	1998-05-09	Barnstable, Massachusetts	Barnstable High School (USHS–MA)	—
2	(United States)	Case McCarthy	Freshman	D	6' 1" (1.85 m)	198 lb (90 kg)	2001-01-09	Clarence Center, New York	USNTDP (USHL)	NJD, 118th overall 2019
3	(United States)	Ty Amonte	Junior	F	5' 11" (1.8 m)	175 lb (79 kg)	1998-01-11	Norwell, Massachusetts	Penticton Vees (BCHL)	—
4	(United States)	David Farrance	Junior	D	6' 0" (1.83 m)	190 lb (86 kg)	1999-06-23	Victor, New York	USNTDP (USHL)	NSH, 92nd overall 2017
5	(Canada)	Cam Crotty (A)	Junior	D	6' 2" (1.88 m)	190 lb (86 kg)	1999-05-05	Greely, Ontario	Brockville Braves (CCHL)	ARI, 82nd overall 2017
7	(United States)	Alex Vlasic	Freshman	D	6' 6" (1.98 m)	199 lb (90 kg)	2001-06-05	Wilmette, Illinois	USNTDP (USHL)	CHI, 43rd overall 2019
9	(United States)	Logan Cockerill (A)	Junior	F	5' 9" (1.75 m)	175 lb (79 kg)	1999-03-03	Brighton, Michigan	USNTDP (USHL)	NYI, 201st overall 2017
10	(Canada)	Gabriel Chabot	Senior	F	5' 9" (1.75 m)	175 lb (79 kg)	1995-12-15	Quebec City, Quebec	Rochester Jr. Americans (USPHL)	—
11	(United States)	Patrick Curry (C)	Senior	F	6' 0" (1.83 m)	185 lb (84 kg)	1996-01-09	Schaumburg, Illinois	Bloomington Thunder (USHL)	—
12	(United States)	Jamie Armstrong	Freshman	F	6' 2" (1.88 m)	192 lb (87 kg)	1998-08-07	Warwick, Rhode Island	Boston Junior Bruins (NCDC)	—
13	(United States)	Trevor Zegras	Freshman	F	6' 0" (1.83 m)	169 lb (77 kg)	2000-03-20	Bedford, New York	USNTDP (USHL)	ANA, 9th overall 2019
14	(United States)	Sean Driscoll	Freshman	D	6' 2" (1.88 m)	194 lb (88 kg)	1998-07-02	Mequon, Wisconsin	Janesville Jets (NAHL)	—
15	(Canada)	Markus Boguslavsky	Freshman	F	6' 1" (1.85 m)	190 lb (86 kg)	1999-05-15	Calgary, Alberta	Drumheller Dragons (AJHL)	—
16	(United States)	Robert Mastrosimone	Freshman	F	5' 10" (1.78 m)	170 lb (77 kg)	2001-01-24	East Islip, New York	Chicago Steel (USHL)	DET, 54th overall 2019
17	(United States)	Jake Wise	Sophomore	F	5' 11" (1.8 m)	190 lb (86 kg)	2000-02-28	Reading, Massachusetts	USNTDP (USHL)	CHI, 69th overall 2018
18	(United States)	Alex Brink	Graduate	F	6' 0" (1.83 m)	200 lb (91 kg)	1994-06-12	Hamilton, New York	Brown (ECAC)	—
19	(United States)	Jack DeBoer	Sophomore	F	6' 3" (1.91 m)	188 lb (85 kg)	2000-08-17	Madison, New Jersey	USNTDP (USHL)	—
20	(United States)	Matthew Quercia	Sophomore	F	6' 3" (1.91 m)	202 lb (92 kg)	1999-02-24	Andover, Massachusetts	Sioux Falls Stampede (USHL)	—
21	(United States)	Patrick Harper (A)	Senior	F	5' 9" (1.75 m)	160 lb (73 kg)	1998-07-29	New Canaan, Connecticut	Avon Old Farms (USHS–CT)	NSH, 138th overall 2016
22	(United States)	Jake Witkowski	Junior	F	5' 10" (1.78 m)	178 lb (81 kg)	1996-08-28	Melrose, Massachusetts	Alberni Valley Bulldogs (BCHL)	—
23	(United States)	Domenick Fensore	Freshman	D	5' 7" (1.7 m)	151 lb (68 kg)	2001-09-07	Thornwood, New York	USNTDP (USHL)	CAR, 90th overall 2019
25	(Canada)	Sam Stevens	Freshman	F	6' 1" (1.85 m)	184 lb (83 kg)	2000-04-27	Montreal, Quebec	Sioux Falls Stampede (USHL)	—
26	(Finland)	Kasper Kotkansalo	Junior	D	6' 3" (1.91 m)	205 lb (93 kg)	1998-11-16	Espoo, Finland	Sioux Falls Stampede (USHL)	DET, 71st overall 2017
27	(United States)	John Copeland	Freshman	D	6' 6" (1.98 m)	181 lb (82 kg)	1999-03-03	Wellesley, Massachusetts	Carleton Place Canadians (CCHL)	—
28	(Canada)	Ethan Phillips	Freshman	F	5' 9" (1.75 m)	155 lb (70 kg)	2001-05-07	Dartmouth, Nova Scotia	Sioux Falls Stampede (USHL)	DET, 97th overall 2019
29	(United States)	Vinnie Purpura	Sophomore	G	6' 6" (1.98 m)	194 lb (88 kg)	1998-10-29	Lemont, Illinois	Youngstown Phantoms (USHL)	—
30	(Canada)	Ashton Abel	Sophomore	G	6' 0" (1.83 m)	165 lb (75 kg)	1999-10-22	Fort McMurray, Alberta	Okotoks Oilers (AJHL)	—
31	(United States)	Sam Tucker	Graduate	G	6' 3" (1.91 m)	190 lb (86 kg)	1996-04-16	Wilton, Connecticut	Yale (ECAC)	—
32	(Sweden)	Wilmer Skoog	Sophomore	F	6' 2" (1.88 m)	197 lb (89 kg)	1999-07-17	Tyresö, Sweden	Maryland Black Bears (NAHL)	—
33	(Sweden)	Hugo Blixt	Sophomore	D	6' 4" (1.93 m)	195 lb (88 kg)	1998-01-02	Linköping, Sweden	Tri-City Storm (USHL)	—

== Standings ==
2019–20 Hockey East Standings
	Conference record							Overall record					
	GP	W	L	T	PTS	GF	GA	GP	W	L	T	GF	GA
#5 Boston College †	24	17	6	1	35	93	48	34	24	8	2	136	71
#9 Massachusetts	24	14	8	2	30	69	49	34	21	11	2	107	67
#12 Massachusetts–Lowell	24	12	7	5	29	60	60	34	18	10	6	90	79
#15 Maine	24	12	9	3	27	56	56	34	18	11	5	89	75
Connecticut	24	12	10	2	26	71	75	34	15	15	4	102	106
Boston University	24	10	9	5	25	69	64	34	13	13	8	103	98
#19 Northeastern	24	11	12	1	23	66	71	34	18	13	3	98	92
Providence	24	10	11	3	23	70	63	34	16	12	6	102	78
New Hampshire	24	9	12	3	21	54	69	34	15	15	4	91	97
Merrimack	24	7	14	3	17	63	77	34	9	22	3	85	123
Vermont	24	2	18	4	8	44	83	34	5	23	6	59	100
Championship: March 21, 2020 † indicates conference regular season champion * indicates conference tournament champion (Lamoriello Trophy); Rankings: USCHO.com Top 20 Poll

== Schedule and results ==
Date	Time	Opponent^{#}	Rank^{#}	Site	TV	Decision	Result	Attendance	Record
Regular season
October 5	4:00 PM	at Union*		Achilles Rink • Schenectady, New York		Tucker	W 7–3	2,088	1–0–0
October 18	8:35 PM	at Northern Michigan*	#20	Berry Events Center • Marquette, Michigan		Tucker	T 4–4 ^{OT}	3,277	1–0–1
October 19	8:05 PM	at Northern Michigan*	#20	Berry Events Center • Marquette, Michigan		Purpura	L 3–4	3,083	1–1–1
October 25	7:05 PM	at Massachusetts–Lowell		Tsongas Center • Lowell, Massachusetts	NESN	Tucker	T 3–3 ^{OT}	4,592	1–1–2 (0–0–1)
October 26	7:05 PM	vs. New Hampshire		Agganis Arena • Boston, Massachusetts		Tucker	W 3–0	2,777	2–1–2 (1–0–1)
November 1	7:30 PM	at Maine		Alfond Arena • Orono, Maine		Tucker	L 2–4	3,447	2–2–2 (1–1–1)
November 2	6:00 PM	at Maine		Alfond Arena • Orono, Maine		Tucker	T 2–2 ^{OT}	4,037	2–2–3 (1–1–2)
November 8	7:37 PM	at #11 Providence		Agganis Arena • Boston, Massachusetts		Tucker	T 3–3 ^{OT}	2,873	2–2–4 (1–1–3)
November 9	7:00 PM	at #11 Providence		Schneider Arena • Providence, Rhode Island	NESN	Purpura	L 5–6	2,741	2–3–4 (1–2–3)
November 15	7:35 PM	at #5 Massachusetts		Agganis Arena • Boston, Massachusetts		Tucker	W 4–3	3,504	3–3–4 (2–2–3)
November 16	8:00 PM	at #5 Massachusetts		Mullins Center • Amherst, Massachusetts		Tucker	L 1–4	5,583	3–4–4 (2–3–3)
November 22	7:00 PM	vs. Vermont		Agganis Arena • Boston, Massachusetts		Tucker	W 3–0	2,331	4–4–4 (3–3–3)
November 23	7:00 PM	vs. Vermont		Agganis Arena • Boston, Massachusetts	NESN	Tucker	T 3–3 ^{OT}	3,168	4–4–5 (3–3–4)
November 26	7:05 PM	vs. Sacred Heart*		Agganis Arena • Boston, Massachusetts		Tucker	L 0–4	1,826	4–5–5 (3–3–4)
November 30	8:15 AM	vs. #2 Cornell*		Madison Square Garden • New York, New York (Red Hot Hockey)		Tucker	L 0–2	15,142	4–6–5 (3–3–4)
December 3	7:05 PM	vs. #12 Harvard*		Agganis Arena • Boston, Massachusetts		Tucker	W 5–2	2,922	5–6–5 (3–3–4)
December 7	7:00 PM	vs. #8 Northeastern		Agganis Arena • Boston, Massachusetts		Tucker	W 6–3	3,681	6–6–5 (4–3–4)
December 29	5:00 PM	vs. Concordia*		Matthews Arena • Boston, Massachusetts (Exhibition)		Abel	W 3–0	1,310	
January 3	7:00 PM	at US National Junior Team*		USA Hockey Arena • Plymouth, Michigan (Exhibition)		Tucker	T 3–3 ^{SOW}	1,679	
January 8	7:00 PM	vs. Brown*		Matthews Arena • Boston, Massachusetts		Tucker	W 3–2 ^{OT}	2,230	7–6–5 (4–3–4)
January 11	7:00 PM	at Dartmouth		Thompson Arena • Hanover, New Hampshire		Abel	L 4–5	2,511	7–7–5 (4–3–4)
January 17	7:00 PM	at Merrimack		J. Thom Lawler Rink • North Andover, Massachusetts		Abel	W 3–2	2,503	8–7–5 (5–3–4)
January 18	7:00 PM	at #5 Boston College		Conte Forum • Chestnut Hill, Massachusetts	NESN+	Tucker	L 3–4	7,884	8–8–5 (5–4–4)
January 24	7:30 PM	at #12 Massachusetts–Lowell		Matthews Arena • Boston, Massachusetts		Abel	W 5–0	3,815	9–8–5 (6–4–4)
January 25	6:05 PM	at #12 Massachusetts–Lowell		Tsongas Center • Lowell, Massachusetts	NESN	Abel	T 2–2	6,234	9–8–6 (6–4–5)
January 31	7:00 PM	at Vermont		Gutterson Fieldhouse • Burlington, Vermont		Abel	W 4–2	3,305	10–8–6 (7–4–5)
Beanpot
February 3	8:00 PM	vs. #4 Boston College		TD Garden • Boston, Massachusetts (Beanpot Semifinal)	NESN	Abel	T 4–4 ^{2OTW}	13,141	10–8–7 (7–4–5)
February 7	7:00 PM	vs. Merrimack		Matthews Arena • Boston, Massachusetts		Abel	L 1–5	3,499	10–9–7 (7–5–5)
February 10	7:30 PM	at #12 Northeastern		TD Garden • Boston, Massachusetts (Beanpot Championship)	NESN	Tucker	T 4–4 ^{2OTL}	17,850	10–9–8 (7–5–5)
February 14	7:00 PM	at New Hampshire		Whittemore Center • Durham, New Hampshire	NESN+	Tucker	W 4–1	4,969	11–9–8 (8–5–5)
February 15	7:00 PM	vs. New Hampshire		Agganis Arena • Boston, Massachusetts		Tucker	W 3–1	3,814	12–9–8 (9–5–5)
February 21	7:00 PM	at Connecticut		XL Center • Hartford, Connecticut		Tucker	L 3–4 ^{OT}	5,653	12–10–8 (9–6–5)
February 22	7:00 PM	vs. Connecticut		Agganis Arena • Boston, Massachusetts	NESN	Abel	L 1–6	3,808	12–11–8 (9–7–5)
February 29	7:05 PM	vs. #4 Boston College		Agganis Arena • Boston, Massachusetts	NESN	Tucker	L 1–4	5,772	12–12–8 (9–8–5)
March 6	7:00 PM	at #16 Northeastern		Matthews Arena • Boston, Massachusetts	NESN	Tucker	W 3–0	2,712	13–12–8 (10–8–5)
March 7	4:00 PM	vs. #16 Northeastern		Agganis Arena • Boston, Massachusetts		Tucker	L 1–2	3,942	13–13–8 (10–9–5)
Hockey East Tournament
Tournament Cancelled
*Non-conference game. ^{#}Rankings from USCHO.com Poll. All times are in Eastern Time.

== Scoring Statistics ==
Name	Position	Games	Goals	Assists	Points	PIM
David Farrance	D	34	14	29	43	20
Patrick Harper	C	32	14	23	37	6
Trevor Zegras	C/LW/RW	33	11	25	36	43
Patrick Curry	F	34	19	13	32	28
Robert Mastrosimone	C/LW	34	7	10	17	10
Domenick Fensore	D	34	3	13	16	24
Matthew Quercia	F	29	6	7	13	14
Jake Wise	C	33	2	11	13	12
Case McCarthy	D	32	2	10	12	10
Ethan Phillips	RW	31	2	8	10	8
Cam Crotty	D	30	4	5	9	26
Kasper Kotkansalo	D	34	0	8	8	23
Wilmer Skoog	C	17	5	2	7	20
Gabriel Chabot	F	33	5	2	7	17
Sam Stevens	F	20	3	3	6	14
Logan Cockerill	LW/RW	18	2	3	5	12
Jack DeBoer	D	20	3	1	4	8
Jamie Armstrong	LW	23	1	3	4	25
Alex Vlasic	D	34	0	4	4	10
Alex Brink	F	34	0	3	3	29
Jake Witkowski	F	11	0	2	2	2
Markus Boguslavsky	RW	19	0	1	1	4
Sam Tucker	G	26	0	1	1	0
Nico Lynch	G	1	0	0	0	0
John Copeland	F/D	1	0	0	0	0
Vinnie Purpura	G	2	0	0	0	0
Ashton Abel	G	9	0	0	0	0
Hugo Blixt	D	10	0	0	0	0
Sean Driscoll	D	15	0	0	0	6
Bench	-	-	-	-	-	8
Total			103	187	290	379

== Goaltending statistics ==
Name	Games	Minutes	Wins	Losses	Ties	Goals against	Saves	Shut outs	SV %	GAA
Sam Tucker	26	1484	10	8	6	62	661	3	.914	2.51
Ashton Abel	9	494	3	3	2	26	213	1	.891	3.15
Vinnie Purpura	2	73	0	2	0	6	37	0	.860	4.90
Nico Lynch	1	7	0	0	0	1	4	0	.800	8.33
Empty Net	-	23	-	-	-	3	-	-	-	-
Total	34	2082	13	13	8	98	915	4	.903	2.82

== Rankings ==
Poll	Week																							
Poll	Pre	1	2	3	4	5	6	7	8	9	10	11	12	13	14	15	16	17	18	19	20	21	22	23 (Final)
USCHO.com	NR	20	20	NR	NR	NR	NR	NR	NR	NR	NR	NR	NR	NR	NR	NR	NR	NR	NR	NR	NR	NR	NR	NR
USA Today	NR	NR	NR	NR	NR	NR	NR	NR	NR	NR	NR	NR	NR	NR	NR	NR	NR	NR	NR	NR	NR	NR	NR	NR

== Players drafted into the NHL ==
=== 2020 NHL entry draft ===
Round	Pick	Player	NHL team
2	46	Drew Commesso†	Chicago Blackhawks
2	47	Luke Tuch†	Montreal Canadiens
3	86	Dylan Peterson†	St. Louis Blues
5	130	Artem Shlaine†	New Jersey Devils

† incoming freshman
