= Albie O'Connell =

American ice hockey player and coach

Biographical details
- Born: May 20, 1976 (age 50); Watertown, Massachusetts, U.S.
- Education: Boston University

Playing career
- 1995–1999: Boston University
- 1999–2000: Pensacola Ice Pilots
- 2000–2001: Basingstoke Bison
- 2001–2002: Cardiff Devils
- 2001–2002: Atlantic City Boardwalk Bullies
- Position: Forward

Coaching career (HC unless noted)
- 2002–2003: Berkshire School (asst.)
- 2003–2004: Colby (asst.)
- 2004–2006: Niagara (asst.)
- 2006–2007: Holy Cross (asst.)
- 2007–2008: Merrimack (asst.)
- 2008–2011: Northeastern (asst.)
- 2011–2014: Harvard (asst.)
- 2014–2018: Boston University (asst.)
- 2018–2022: Boston University
- 2022–2023: Montreal Canadiens (scout)
- 2023–2024: Arizona State (asst.)
- 2024–present: Montreal Canadiens (scout)

Head coaching record
- Overall: 58–49–16 (.537)
- Tournaments: 0–1 (.000)

Albie O'Connell (born May 20, 1976) is an American ice hockey coach, scout, and former player. He is known for being the head coach of Boston University from 2018 to 2022. O'Connell also captained the Terriers as a senior. During his tenure, the team won four Beanpots, three regular season titles, and made two Frozen Four appearances. He coached at several schools as an assistant before being named head coach of Boston University. He would coach the team for four seasons to a record of 58-49-16 and a single Beanpot. Since leaving the team in 2022, he has worked as a scout and an assistant coach.

== Career ==
=== Player ===
A Watertown native, Albie O'Connell joined the program at Boston University on the heels of their fourth National Championship. He scored 17 points his first season, but BU would be downed by eventual champion Michigan in the Frozen Four. O'Connell stayed with the team the following year when the Terriers won both the Hockey East regular season and tournament. As a senior O'Connell was named captain of the team and led the Terriers in scoring with 39 points. Over the course of his college career, he would win four Beanpots, three regular-season titles, and make two Frozen Four appearances.

O'Connell was drafted by the Islanders in the 5th round of the 1994 NHL entry draft but went unsigned. After graduating with a history degree, he spent his first season as a professional with the Pensacola Ice Pilots. The next year he joined the Basingstoke Bison of the now-defunct BNL and scored 74 points in 36 games. He led his team in scoring by 23 points, finishing 3rd overall in the league. In the playoffs he paced the Bison with 11 points in 10 games. The following year, O'Connell played for the Cardiff Devils but was not able to replicate his success. After only 11 games in Wales he returned to the ECHL with the Boardwalk Bullies. In 2002, after 13 games with the team, he retired from playing.

=== Coach ===
In 2003, O'Connell got his first coaching job with Berkshire School, a Prep School in Western Massachusetts. After a year he returned to the NCAA as an assistant for Division III Colby College. He moved to the Division I level with Niagara the following season. After a brief stop with Holy Cross in the 2006–07 season, O'Connell made his way back to Hockey East working under Merrimack head coach Mark Dennehy. That summer when he joined the program at Northeastern as a recruiting coordinator. After three years with the Huskies, he was hired by Ted Donato at Harvard and tasked with improving the defensive corps and special teams. In 2014, after three years at Harvard, he returned to BU as an assistant coach.

O'Connell's return coincided with the arrival of the future NHL 2015 Entry Draft 2nd overall pick Jack Eichel. That year the team won both the conference, regular season, and tournament titles. The Terriers received the #3 overall seed in the tournament but fell in the Championship to Providence 4–3. O'Connell was promoted to associate head coach the following year, and the Terriers continued to perform well, appearing in each of the next three tournaments and making the quarterfinal round twice. Head coach David Quinn accepted a position with the New York Rangers in the spring of 2018 and less than two weeks later O'Connell was named as his successor.

O'Connell's first season with the Terriers saw more losses than wins, and the team would fail to reach the NCAA tournament. After a similar season, the 2020 tournament was cancelled due to the COVID-19 pandemic. O'Connell saw more success in the 2020-21 season, qualifying for the NCAA tournament for what would be the only time during his tenure, his team eventually falling to Northeastern in the regional semifinal. After a rocky start in 2021, the team would improve to a 15-1-1 stretch late in the season that culminated in O'Connell's only Beanpot victory as a coach, and the Terriers' first since 2015.

O'Connell has been credited for his player development. Famous BU alumni that played under him include Jack Eichel, Charlie McAvoy, Matt Grzelcyk, and Trevor Zegras, among others.

Despite their good performance down the stretch, BU would fall in the Hockey East quarterfinals to the University of Connecticut. On March 30, 2022, O'Connell was fired as head coach of Boston University. BU's athletic director cited failure to meet the expectations of the program as the reason.

=== Scout ===
In 2022, O'Connell was hired as an amateur scout by the Montreal Canadiens. He is tasked with scouting the NCAA. In 2023, he was hired by Arizona State as a recruiting coordinator and associate coach. He returned to the Canadiens in 2024 as chief North American scout.

== Head coaching record ==
Record table
Season	Team	Overall	Conference	Standing	Postseason
Boston University Terriers (Hockey East) (2018–2022)
2018–19	Boston University	16–18–4	12–9–3	5th	Hockey East Semifinals
2019–20	Boston University	13–13–8	10–9–5	6th	Tournament cancelled
2020–21	Boston University	10–5–1	10–3–1	2nd	NCAA regional semifinal
2021–22	Boston University	19–13–3	13–8–3	T–4th	Hockey East Quarterfinals
Boston University:		58–49–16 (.537)	45–29–12 (.593)		
Total:		58–49–16 (.537)			
National champion Postseason invitational champion Conference regular season champion Conference regular season and conference tournament champion Division regular season champion Division regular season and conference tournament champion Conference tournament champion
