= 2019–20 UMass Minutemen ice hockey season =

- Conference: 2nd Hockey East
- Home ice: Mullins Center

Rankings
- USCHO: 9
- USA Today: 9

Record
- Overall: 21–11–2
- Conference: 14–8–2
- Home: 12–4–1
- Road: 9–7–1
- Neutral: 0–0–0

Coaches and captains
- Head coach: Greg Carvel
- Assistant coaches: Ben Barr; Jared DeMichiel; Ryan Bliss
- Captain(s): Niko Hildenbrand; Mitchell Chaffee

The 2019–20 UMass Minutemen ice hockey season was the 88th season of play for the program, the 27th season competing at the Division I level, and the 26th season in the Hockey East conference. The Minutemen represented the University of Massachusetts Amherst and were coached by Greg Carvel, in his 4th season.

The Hockey East tournament as well as the NCAA Tournament were cancelled due to the COVID-19 pandemic before any games were played.

== Roster ==
As of September 7, 2019.

No.	Nat.	Player	Class	Pos	Height	Weight	DoB	Hometown	Previous team	NHL rights
2	(United States)	Marc Del Gaizo	Sophomore	D	5' 10" (1.78 m)	190 lb (86 kg)	1999-10-11	Basking Ridge, New Jersey	Muskegon Lumberjacks (USHL)	NSH, 109th overall 2019
3	(United States)	Ty Farmer	Sophomore	D	5' 11" (1.8 m)	177 lb (80 kg)	1998-01-06	O'Fallon, Missouri	Fargo Force (USHL)	—
4	(United States)	Matthew Kessel	Freshman	D	6' 3" (1.91 m)	192 lb (87 kg)	2000-06-23	Bloomfield Hills, Michigan	Sioux Falls Stampede (USHL)	—
6	(United States)	Kolby Vegara	Sophomore	D	6' 1" (1.85 m)	196 lb (89 kg)	1997-07-15	Malden, Massachusetts	Philadelphia Rebels (NAHL)	—
7	(United States)	Calen Kiefiuk	Freshman	F	5' 10" (1.78 m)	187 lb (85 kg)	2000-02-28	Macomb, Michigan	Central Illinois Flying Aces (USHL)	—
8	(United States)	Bobby Trivigno	Sophomore	F	5' 8" (1.73 m)	152 lb (69 kg)	1999-01-19	Setauket, New York	Waterloo Black Hawks (USHL)	—
9	(United States)	John Leonard	Junior	F	5' 11" (1.8 m)	194 lb (88 kg)	1998-08-07	Amherst, Massachusetts	Green Bay Gamblers (USHL)	SJS, 182nd overall 2018
10	(United States)	Jack Suter	Senior	F	6' 0" (1.83 m)	169 lb (77 kg)	1995-04-19	Omaha, Nebraska	Sioux Falls Stampede (USHL)	—
11	(United States)	Bobby Kaiser	Sophomore	F	6' 2" (1.88 m)	192 lb (87 kg)	1997-05-09	Grosse Pointe, Michigan	Muskegon Lumberjacks (USHL)	—
12	(United States)	Anthony Del Gaizo	Sophomore	F	5' 10" (1.78 m)	200 lb (91 kg)	1998-01-31	Basking Ridge, New Jersey	Muskegon Lumberjacks (USHL)	—
13	(United States)	Reed Lebster	Freshman	F	6' 0" (1.83 m)	179 lb (81 kg)	1999-03-04	Grand Rapids, Michigan	Des Moines Buccaneers (USHL)	—
14	(United States)	Jeremy Davidson	Freshman	F	5' 10" (1.78 m)	174 lb (79 kg)	2000-02-28	Kalamazoo, Michigan	Fargo Force (USHL)	—
15	(Canada)	Marco Bozzo	Junior	F	5' 10" (1.78 m)	175 lb (79 kg)	1996-11-22	Woodbridge, Ontario	Newmarket Hurricanes (OJHL)	—
17	(Canada)	Philip Lagunov	Junior	F	6' 0" (1.83 m)	185 lb (84 kg)	1998-11-22	Hamilton, Ontario	Burlington Cougars (OJHL)	—
18	(Canada)	Jake Gaudet	Junior	F	6' 2" (1.88 m)	200 lb (91 kg)	1996-06-18	Ottawa, Ontario	Kemptville 73's (CCHL)	—
19	(United States)	Niko Hildenbrand (C)	Senior	F	5' 10" (1.78 m)	182 lb (83 kg)	1995-08-18	Vacaville, California	Fargo Force (USHL)	—
20	(Canada)	Oliver Chau	Junior	F	5' 9" (1.75 m)	165 lb (75 kg)	1997-08-21	Oakville, Ontario	Brooks Bandits (AJHL)	—
21	(United States)	Mitchell Chaffee (C)	Junior	F	6' 0" (1.83 m)	208 lb (94 kg)	1998-01-26	Rockford, Michigan	Fargo Force (USHL)	—
22	(Canada)	Peyton Reeves	Freshman	F	6' 2" (1.88 m)	187 lb (85 kg)	1998-08-22	Toronto, Ontario	Oakville Blades (OJHL)	—
23	(Canada)	Gianfranco Cassaro	Freshman	D	5' 11" (1.8 m)	185 lb (84 kg)	1999-03-30	Nobleton, Ontario	Youngstown Phantoms (USHL)	—
24	(United States)	Zac Jones	Freshman	D	5' 10" (1.78 m)	176 lb (80 kg)	2000-10-18	Glen Allen, Virginia	Tri-City Storm (USHL)	NYR, 68th overall 2019
26	(United States)	Colin Felix	Sophomore	D	6' 1" (1.85 m)	195 lb (88 kg)	1999-01-07	Ocean City, New Jersey	Madison Capitols (USHL)	—
27	(United States)	Jake McLaughlin	Senior	D	6' 2" (1.88 m)	192 lb (87 kg)	1996-03-26	Hinsdale, Illinois	Fargo Force (USHL)	—
28	(Canada)	Eric Faith	Freshman	F	5' 11" (1.8 m)	170 lb (77 kg)	1998-04-18	Carp, Ontario	Brockville Braves (CCHL)	—
29	(United States)	George Mika	Junior	F	5' 11" (1.8 m)	184 lb (83 kg)	1996-10-19	Naples, Florida	Amarillo Bulls (NAHL)	—
31	(Canada)	Matt Murray	Junior	G	6' 1" (1.85 m)	196 lb (89 kg)	1998-02-02	St. Albert, Alberta	Fargo Force (USHL)	—
32	(United States)	Alex Camarre	Freshman	G	5' 8" (1.73 m)	165 lb (75 kg)	1998-11-04	North Tonawanda, New York	Odessa Jackalopes (NAHL)	—
35	(Finland)	Filip Lindberg	Sophomore	G	6' 1" (1.85 m)	188 lb (85 kg)	1999-01-31	Espoo, Finland	TUTO Hockey U20 (Nuorten SM-liiga)	MIN, 197th overall 2019

== Standings ==
2019–20 Hockey East Standings
	Conference record							Overall record					
	GP	W	L	T	PTS	GF	GA	GP	W	L	T	GF	GA
#5 Boston College †	24	17	6	1	35	93	48	34	24	8	2	136	71
#9 Massachusetts	24	14	8	2	30	69	49	34	21	11	2	107	67
#12 Massachusetts–Lowell	24	12	7	5	29	60	60	34	18	10	6	90	79
#15 Maine	24	12	9	3	27	56	56	34	18	11	5	89	75
Connecticut	24	12	10	2	26	71	75	34	15	15	4	102	106
Boston University	24	10	9	5	25	69	64	34	13	13	8	103	98
#19 Northeastern	24	11	12	1	23	66	71	34	18	13	3	98	92
Providence	24	10	11	3	23	70	63	34	16	12	6	102	78
New Hampshire	24	9	12	3	21	54	69	34	15	15	4	91	97
Merrimack	24	7	14	3	17	63	77	34	9	22	3	85	123
Vermont	24	2	18	4	8	44	83	34	5	23	6	59	100
Championship: March 21, 2020 † indicates conference regular season champion * indicates conference tournament champion (Lamoriello Trophy); Rankings: USCHO.com Top 20 Poll

== Schedule and results ==
Date	Time	Opponent^{#}	Rank^{#}	Site	TV	Decision	Result	Attendance	Record
Regular season
October 11	7:00 PM	vs. Rensselaer*	#4	Mullins Center • Amherst, Massachusetts	NESN	Lindberg	W 5–3	3,628	1–0–0
October 15	7:05 PM	at #15 Northeastern	#4	Matthews Arena • Boston, Massachusetts	NESN	Murray	L 1–3	2,707	1–1–0 (0–1–0)
October 18	7:00 PM	vs. Union*	#4	Mullins Center • Amherst, Massachusetts	NESN	Murray	W 6–1	4,447	2–1–0 (0–1–0)
October 19	7:00 PM	vs. Union*	#4	Mullins Center • Amherst, Massachusetts		Lindberg	W 5–0	5,659	3–1–0 (0–1–0)
October 25	7:00 PM	vs. American International*	#3	Mullins Center • Amherst, Massachusetts		Murray	W 4–1	4,873	4–1–0 (0–1–0)
November 1	7:00 PM	at #10 Northeastern	#3	Matthews Arena • Boston, Massachusetts	NESN+	Lindberg	W 6–3	3,063	5–1–0 (1–1–0)
November 2	8:00 PM	vs. #10 Northeastern	#3	Mullins Center • Amherst, Massachusetts	NESN+	Murray	W 4–2	4,573	6–1–0 (2–1–0)
November 10	1:00 PM	at New Hampshire	#2	Whittemore Center • Durham, New Hampshire	NESN	Lindberg	L 1–3	4,707	6–2–0 (2–2–0)
November 15	7:35 PM	at Boston University	#5	Agganis Arena • Boston, Massachusetts		Lindberg	L 3–4	3,504	6–3–0 (2–3–0)
November 16	8:00 PM	vs. Boston University	#5	Mullins Center • Amherst, Massachusetts		Lindberg	W 4–1	5,583	7–3–0 (3–3–0)
November 22	7:00 PM	vs. Merrimack	#7	Mullins Center • Amherst, Massachusetts	NESN	Lindberg	T 2–2 ^{OT}	2,904	7–3–1 (3–3–1)
November 23	7:05 PM	at Merrimack	#7	J. Thom Lawler Rink • North Andover, Massachusetts		Murray	W 3–2	2,412	8–3–1 (4–3–1)
November 29	7:05 PM	at Quinnipiac*	#10	People's United Center • Hamden, Connecticut		Murray	W 3–0	2,992	9–3–1 (4–3–1)
November 30	7:00 AM	vs. Quinnipiac*	#10	Mullins Center • Amherst, Massachusetts	NESN	Lindberg	L 1–2	2,857	9–4–1 (4–3–1)
December 6	7:05 PM	vs. Maine*	#11	Mullins Center • Amherst, Massachusetts		Murray	W 5–1	4,507	10–4–1 (5–3–1)
December 7	7:00 PM	vs. Maine	#11	Mullins Center • Amherst, Massachusetts	NESN+	Murray	W 4–1	3,545	11–4–1 (6–3–1)
December 10	7:00 PM	at Brown*	#9	Meehan Auditorium • Providence, Rhode Island	NESN	Lindberg	W 4–0	410	12–4–1 (6–3–1)
December 29	5:00 PM	at Rensselaer*	#9	Houston Field House • Troy, New York		Murray	W 5–3	2,332	13–4–1 (6–3–1)
January 3	9:07 PM	at #7 Denver*	#9	Magness Arena • Denver, Colorado	NESN+	Lindberg	L 2–4	6,017	13–5–1 (6–3–1)
January 4	9:07 PM	at #7 Denver*	#9	Magness Arena • Denver, Colorado		Murray	L 3–4	5,986	13–6–1 (6–3–1)
January 10	7:00 PM	at #4 Boston College	#10	Conte Forum • Chestnut Hill, Massachusetts	NESN	Lindberg	W 3–1	6,705	14–6–1 (7–3–1)
January 11	7:00 PM	vs. #4 Boston College	#10	Mullins Center • Amherst, Massachusetts	NESN+	Murray	L 3–6	5,153	14–7–1 (7–4–1)
January 17	7:05 PM	at Vermont	#10	Gutterson Fieldhouse • Burlington, Vermont		Murray	W 4–0	3,044	15–7–1 (8–4–1)
January 18	7:05 PM	at Vermont	#10	Gutterson Fieldhouse • Burlington, Vermont		Lindberg	W 3–1	3,015	16–7–1 (9–4–1)
January 24	7:30 PM	at New Hampshire	#7	Mullins Center • Amherst, Massachusetts		Murray	L 0–1	4,873	16–8–1 (9–5–1)
January 25	6:00 PM	at New Hampshire	#7	Whittemore Center • Durham, New Hampshire	NESN+	Lindberg	T 1–1 ^{OT}	4,873	16–8–2 (9–5–2)
January 31	7:00 PM	vs. #5 Boston College	#7	Mullins Center • Amherst, Massachusetts		Murray	L 0–3	7,336	16–9–2 (9–6–2)
February 7	7:00 PM	vs. #10 Providence	#8	Mullins Center • Amherst, Massachusetts	NESN	Lindberg	W 3–1	4,202	17–9–2 (10–6–2)
February 8	:00 PM	at #10 Providence	#8	Schneider Arena • Providence, Rhode Island		Murray	W 5–1	3,030	18–9–2 (11–6–2)
February 21	7:15 PM	at #14 Massachusetts–Lowell	#8	Tsongas Center • Lowell, Massachusetts		Murray	L 2–3	6,474	18–10–2 (11–7–2)
February 22	7:00 PM	vs. #14 Massachusetts–Lowell	#8	Mullins Center • Amherst, Massachusetts	NESN+	Murray	W 5–3	5,802	19–10–2 (12–7–2)
February 28	7:08 PM	at Connecticut	#8	XL Center • Hartford, Connecticut		Lindberg	L 2–3	6,666	19–11–2 (12–8–2)
February 29	8:00 PM	at Connecticut	#8	Mullins Center • Amherst, Massachusetts	NESN+	Murray	W 4–3	5,165	20–11–2 (13–8–2)
March 5	7:00 PM	vs. Vermont	#9	Mullins Center • Amherst, Massachusetts		Murray	W 1–0	3,046	21–11–2 (14–8–2)
Hockey East Tournament
Tournament Cancelled
*Non-conference game. ^{#}Rankings from USCHO.com Poll. All times are in Eastern Time.

== Scoring statistics ==
Name	Position	Games	Goals	Assists	Points	PIM
John Leonard	LW	33	27	10	37	8
Mitchell Chaffee	RW	30	16	13	29	16
Zac Jones	D	32	3	20	23	24
Bobby Trivigno	F	34	9	11	20	20
Jack Suter	F	33	4	16	20	10
Oliver Chau	C	32	5	14	19	6
Marc Del Gaizo	D	22	4	11	15	14
Reed Lebster	F	34	9	5	14	8
Jake McLaughlin	D	34	3	11	14	27
Colin Felix	D	34	1	12	13	45
Matthew Kessel	D	34	7	4	11	48
Niko Hildenbrand	F	31	5	6	11	12
Ty Farmer	D	34	2	9	11	24
Cal Kiefiuk	F	30	6	3	9	10
Anthony Del Gaizo	F	31	2	6	8	29
Jake Gaudet	C	19	1	4	5	14
Philip Lagunov	C	27	1	4	5	10
Jeremy Davidson	F	22	1	2	3	6
Gianfranco Cassaro	D	30	1	2	3	12
Matt Murray	G	20	0	3	3	0
Peyton Reeves	LW	23	0	3	3	6
George Mika	F	19	0	1	1	4
Kolby Vegara	D	5	0	0	0	0
Bobby Kaiser	C	6	0	0	0	2
Eric Faith	RW	17	0	0	0	6
Filip Lindberg	LW	18	0	0	0	0
Bench	-	-	-	-	-	10
Total			107	170	277	371

== Goaltending statistics ==
Name	Games	Minutes	Wins	Losses	Ties	Goals against	Saves	Shut outs	SV %	GAA
Matt Murray	20	1094	13	6	0	34	385	3	.919	1.86
Filip Lindberg	18	944	8	5	2	30	379	2	.927	1.91
Empty Net	-	11	-	-	-	3	-	-	-	-
Total	34	2050	21	11	2	67	764	5	.919	1.96

== Rankings ==
Poll	Week																							
Poll	Pre	1	2	3	4	5	6	7	8	9	10	11	12	13	14	15	16	17	18	19	20	21	22	23 (Final)
USCHO.com	4	4	4	3	3	2	5	7	10	11	9	9	9	10	10	7	7	8	8	8	8	9	9	9
USA Today	3	5	4	5	3	2	5	7	10	13	9	9	9	10	10	7	6	8	8	8	9	9	9	9

== Players drafted into the NHL ==
=== 2020 NHL entry draft ===
Round	Pick	Player	NHL team
5	150	Matt Kessel	St. Louis Blues
6	159	Lucas Mercuri†	Carolina Panthers
6	184	Noah Ellis†	Vegas Golden Knights

† incoming freshman
