= 2019–20 Northeastern Huskies men's ice hockey season =

Friendship Four, Champion Beanpot, Champion
- Conference: T–7th Hockey East
- Home ice: Matthews Arena

Rankings
- USCHO: #19
- USA Today: NR

Record
- Overall: 18–13–3
- Conference: 11–12–1
- Home: 9–4–1
- Road: 6–9–1
- Neutral: 3–0–1

Coaches and captains
- Head coach: Jim Madigan
- Assistant coaches: Jerry Keefe; Mike McLaughlin; Ed Walsh
- Captain: Ryan Shea
- Alternate captain(s): John Picking; Matt Filipe; Zach Solow

The 2019-20 Northeastern Huskies Men's ice hockey season was the 88th season of play for the program and the 36th season in the Hockey East conference. The Huskies represented Northeastern University and were coached by Jim Madigan, in his 9th season.

The Hockey East tournament as well as the NCAA Tournament were cancelled due to the COVID-19 pandemic before any games were played.

== Roster ==
As of June 28, 2019.

No.	Nat.	Player	Class	Pos	Height	Weight	DoB	Hometown	Previous team	NHL rights
1	(United States)	Nick Scarpa	Sophomore	G	5' 8" (1.73 m)	170 lb (77 kg)	1997-01-23	Andover, Massachusetts	Valley Jr. Warriors (EHL)	—
2	(United States)	Jordan Harris	Sophomore	D	5' 11" (1.8 m)	185 lb (84 kg)	2000-07-07	Haverhill, Massachusetts	Kimball Union Academy (USHS–NH)	MTL, 71st overall 2018
3	(United States)	Jayden Struble	Freshman	D	6' 0" (1.83 m)	205 lb (93 kg)	2001-09-08	Cumberland, Rhode Island	Saint Sebastian's School (USHS–MA)	MTL, 46th overall 2019
4	(Canada)	Jérémie Bucheler	Freshman	D	6' 4" (1.93 m)	194 lb (88 kg)	2000-03-31	Saint-Laurent, Quebec	Victoria Grizzlies (BCHL)	—
5	(United States)	Ryan Shea (C)	Senior	D	6' 1" (1.85 m)	190 lb (86 kg)	1997-02-11	Milton, Massachusetts	Youngstown Phantoms (USHL)	CHI, 121st overall 2015
6	(United States)	Collin Murphy	Junior	D	6' 3" (1.91 m)	191 lb (87 kg)	1998-11-27	Wilmington, Massachusetts	Muskegon Lumberjacks (USHL)	—
7	(United States)	John Picking (A)	Senior	F	5' 10" (1.78 m)	174 lb (79 kg)	1995-03-12	Wellesley, Massachusetts	Boston Junior Bruins (USPHL)	—
8	(United States)	Julian Kislin	Sophomore	D	6' 0" (1.83 m)	182 lb (83 kg)	1999-05-24	Manalapan, New Jersey	Youngstown Phantoms (USHL)	—
9	(United States)	Tyler Madden	Sophomore	F	5' 11" (1.8 m)	150 lb (68 kg)	1999-11-09	Deerfield Beach, Florida	Tri-City Storm (USHL)	VAN, 68th overall 2018
12	(United States)	Austin Goldstein	Junior	F	5' 9" (1.75 m)	167 lb (76 kg)	1997-02-05	Reading, Massachusetts	Islanders Hockey Club (USPHL)	—
13	(United States)	T. J. Walsh	Freshman	F	5' 9" (1.75 m)	168 lb (76 kg)	2000-04-29	Shrewsbury, Massachusetts	Des Moines Buccaneers (USHL)	—
15	(United States)	Grant Jozefek	Senior	F	5' 9" (1.75 m)	186 lb (84 kg)	1997-10-25	Chester, New Jersey	Lincoln Stars (USHL)	—
16	(United States)	Matt Thomson	Sophomore	F	6' 0" (1.83 m)	205 lb (93 kg)	1998-11-07	Reading, Massachusetts	Cedar Rapids RoughRiders (USHL)	—
17	(United States)	Matt Filipe (A)	Senior	F	6' 2" (1.88 m)	205 lb (93 kg)	1997-12-31	Lynnfield, Massachusetts	Cedar Rapids RoughRiders (USHL)	CAR, 67th overall 2016
18	(Canada)	Tyler Spott	Freshman	D	5' 11" (1.8 m)	174 lb (79 kg)	2000-06-17	Toronto, Ontario	Green Bay Gamblers (USHL)	—
19	(United States)	Riley Hughes	Freshman	F	6' 1" (1.85 m)	174 lb (79 kg)	2000-06-27	Westwood, Massachusetts	Victoria Grizzlies (BCHL)	NYR, 216th overall 2018
20	(United States)	Alex Mella	Freshman	F	6' 0" (1.83 m)	187 lb (85 kg)	1999-02-21	Stamford, Connecticut	Madison Capitols (USHL)	—
21	(United States)	Matt DeMelis	Freshman	F	6' 0" (1.83 m)	185 lb (84 kg)	1999-06-02	Hingham, Massachusetts	Youngstown Phantoms (USHL)	—
22	(United States)	Billy Carrabino	Junior	D	6' 1" (1.85 m)	189 lb (86 kg)	1997-03-20	New Canaan, Connecticut	Boston Junior Bruins (USPHL)	—
23	(United States)	Michael Kesselring	Freshman	D	6' 4" (1.93 m)	190 lb (86 kg)	2000-01-13	New Hampton, New Hampshire	Fargo Force (USHL)	EDM, 164th overall 2018
24	(United States)	A. J. Villella	Sophomore	D	6' 0" (1.83 m)	175 lb (79 kg)	1998-01-26	Davie, Florida	Sioux Falls Stampede (USHL)	—
25	(United States)	Aidan McDonough	Freshman	F	6' 2" (1.88 m)	201 lb (91 kg)	1999-11-06	Milton, Massachusetts	Cedar Rapids RoughRiders (USHL)	VAN, 195th overall 2019
26	(United States)	Biagio Lerario	Senior	F	5' 10" (1.78 m)	165 lb (75 kg)	1995-09-22	Addison, Illinois	Lincoln Stars (USHL)	—
28	(United States)	Zach Solow (A)	Junior	F	5' 9" (1.75 m)	175 lb (79 kg)	1998-11-06	Naples, Florida	Dubuque Fighting Saints (USHL)	—
30	(United States)	Curtis Frye	Senior	G	6' 3" (1.91 m)	215 lb (98 kg)	1995-07-25	Northwood, New Hampshire	Philadelphia Jr. Flyers (USPHL)	—
31	(United States)	Connor Murphy	Freshman	G	6' 4" (1.93 m)	190 lb (86 kg)	1998-09-01	Hudson Falls, New York	Carleton Place Canadians (CCHL)	—

== Standings ==
2019–20 Hockey East Standings
	Conference record							Overall record					
	GP	W	L	T	PTS	GF	GA	GP	W	L	T	GF	GA
#5 Boston College †	24	17	6	1	35	93	48	34	24	8	2	136	71
#9 Massachusetts	24	14	8	2	30	69	49	34	21	11	2	107	67
#12 Massachusetts–Lowell	24	12	7	5	29	60	60	34	18	10	6	90	79
#15 Maine	24	12	9	3	27	56	56	34	18	11	5	89	75
Connecticut	24	12	10	2	26	71	75	34	15	15	4	102	106
Boston University	24	10	9	5	25	69	64	34	13	13	8	103	98
#19 Northeastern	24	11	12	1	23	66	71	34	18	13	3	98	92
Providence	24	10	11	3	23	70	63	34	16	12	6	102	78
New Hampshire	24	9	12	3	21	54	69	34	15	15	4	91	97
Merrimack	24	7	14	3	17	63	77	34	9	22	3	85	123
Vermont	24	2	18	4	8	44	83	34	5	23	6	59	100
Championship: March 21, 2020 † indicates conference regular season champion * indicates conference tournament champion (Lamoriello Trophy); Rankings: USCHO.com Top 20 Poll

== Schedule and results ==
Date	Time	Opponent^{#}	Rank^{#}	Site	TV	Decision	Result	Attendance	Record
Regular season
October 11	7:00 PM	at Union*	#15	Achilles Rink • Schenectady, New York		Pantano	W 2–1	1,740	1–0–0
October 12	4:00 PM	at Union*	#15	Achilles Rink • Schenectady, New York		Pantano	W 2–1	1,852	2–0–0
October 15	7:05 PM	vs. #4 Massachusetts	#15	Matthews Arena • Boston, Massachusetts	NESN	Pantano	W 3–1	2,707	3–0–0 (1–0–0)
October 19	7:05 PM	vs. Holy Cross*	#15	Matthews Arena • Boston, Massachusetts	NESN+	Pantano	T 2–2 ^{OT}	2,504	3–0–1 (1–0–0)
October 25	8:37 PM	at #14 St. Cloud State*	#11	Herb Brooks National Hockey Center • St. Cloud, Minnesota		Pantano	W 4–1	3,581	4–0–1 (1–0–0)
October 26	7:07 PM	at #14 St. Cloud State*	#11	Herb Brooks National Hockey Center • St. Cloud, Minnesota	FSN+	Pantano	L 1–2	4,208	4–1–1 (1–0–0)
November 1	7:00 PM	vs. #3 Massachusetts	#10	Matthews Arena • Boston, Massachusetts	NESN+	Pantano	L 3–6	3,063	4–2–1 (1–1–0)
November 2	7:00 PM	at #3 Massachusetts	#10	Mullins Center • Amherst, Massachusetts	NESN+	Pantano	L 2–4	4,573	4–3–1 (1–2–0)
November 8	7:37 PM	at Merrimack	#13	J. Thom Lawler Rink • North Andover, Massachusetts		Pantano	T 1–1 ^{OT}	2,014	4–3–2 (1–2–1)
November 9	7:00 PM	vs. Merrimack	#13	Matthews Arena • Boston, Massachusetts		Pantano	W 3–1	2,175	5–3–2 (2–2–1)
November 15	7:15 PM	at #10 Providence	#14	Schneider Arena • Providence, Rhode Island		Pantano	L 2–3	2,576	5–4–2 (2–3–1)
November 16	8:00 PM	at #10 Northeastern	#14	Matthews Arena • Boston, Massachusetts		Pantano	W 7–3	2,032	6–4–2 (3–3–1)
November 22	7:00 PM	vs. Maine	#13	Matthews Arena • Boston, Massachusetts	NESN+	Pantano	W 5–2	2,021	7–4–2 (4–3–1)
November 23	7:00 PM	vs. Maine	#13	Matthews Arena • Boston, Massachusetts	NESN+	Pantano	W 3–2	1,929	8–4–2 (5–3–1)
Friendship Four
November 29	10:00 AM	vs. New Hampshire	#12	SSE Arena Belfast • Belfast, Northern Ireland (Friendship Four Semifinal)	NESN+	Pantano	W 4–0	3,200	9–4–2 (6–3–1)
November 30	2:00 PM	vs. Colgate*	#12	SSE Arena Belfast • Belfast, Northern Ireland (Friendship Four Championship)	NESN+	Pantano	W 4–3	5,846	10–4–2 (6–3–1)
December 7	7:00 PM	at Boston University	#8	Agganis Arena • Boston, Massachusetts		Pantano	L 3–6	3,681	10–5–2 (6–4–1)
December 14	4:00 PM	vs. Dartmouth*	#12	Matthews Arena • Boston, Massachusetts	NESN	Pantano	W 6–4	1,764	11–5–2 (6–4–1)
January 3	7:05 PM	vs. Connecticut	#12	XL Center • Hartford, Connecticut		Pantano	W 5–2	4,027	12–5–2 (7–4–1)
January 6	7:00 PM	vs. Bentley*	#11	Matthews Arena • Boston, Massachusetts	NESN	Pantano	W 4–2	2,201	13–5–2 (7–4–1)
January 11	7:00 PM	at New Hampshire	#11	Whittemore Center • Durham, New Hampshire		Pantano	L 4–5 ^{OT}	5,091	13–6–2 (7–5–1)
January 18	4:00 PM	at Connecticut	#12	Matthews Arena • Boston, Massachusetts	NESN	Pantano	L 2–3 ^{OT}	2,712	13–7–2 (7–6–1)
January 31	7:00 PM	vs. #9 Providence	#13	Matthews Arena • Boston, Massachusetts		Pantano	W 4–3	2,705	14–7–2 (8–6–1)
Beanpot
February 3	5:00 PM	vs. #17 Harvard*	#12	TD Garden • Boston, Massachusetts (Beanpot Semifinal)	NESN	Pantano	W 3–1	13,141	15–7–2 (8–6–1)
February 7	7:00 PM	at Maine	#12	Alfond Arena • Orono, Maine	WPME	Pantano	L 2–4	3,122	15–8–2 (8–7–1)
February 10	7:30 PM	vs. Boston University*	#12	TD Garden • Boston, Massachusetts (Beanpot Championship)	NESN	Pantano	T 4–4 ^{2OTW}	17,850	15–8–3 (8–7–1)
February 14	7:15 PM	at #11 Massachusetts–Lowell	#12	Tsongas Center • Lowell, Massachusetts		Pantano	W 3–0	4,513	16–8–3 (9–7–1)
February 15	8:00 PM	vs. #11 Massachusetts–Lowell	#12	Matthews Arena • Boston, Massachusetts	NESN+	Pantano	W 2–1	2,308	17–8–3 (10–7–1)
February 20	7:00 PM	vs. #6 Boston College	#10	Matthews Arena • Boston, Massachusetts	NESN	Pantano	L 2–3	3,054	17–9–3 (10–8–1)
February 21	7:00 PM	at #6 Boston College	#10	Conte Forum • Chestnut Hill, Massachusetts	NESN	Pantano	L 1–10	5,910	17–10–3 (10–9–1)
February 28	7:05 PM	at Vermont	#13	Gutterson Fieldhouse • Burlington, Vermont		Pantano	L 2–4	3,328	17–11–3 (10–10–1)
February 29	7:05 PM	at Vermont	#13	Gutterson Fieldhouse • Burlington, Vermont		Pantano	L 1–3	2,966	17–12–3 (10–11–1)
March 6	7:00 PM	vs. Boston University	#16	Matthews Arena • Boston, Massachusetts	NESN	Pantano	L 0–3	2,712	17–13–3 (10–12–1)
March 7	4:00 PM	at Boston University	#16	Agganis Arena • Boston, Massachusetts		Pantano	W 2–1	3,942	18–13–3 (11–12–1)
Hockey East Tournament
Tournament Cancelled
*Non-conference game. ^{#}Rankings from USCHO.com Poll. All times are in Eastern Time.

== Scoring Statistics ==
Name	Position	Games	Goals	Assists	Points	PIM
Tyler Madden	C	27	19	18	37	34
Zach Solow	C	34	13	18	31	34
Ryan Shea	D	34	5	26	31	10
Aiden McDonough	LW	31	11	16	27	10
Matt Filipe	C/LW	30	9	13	22	24
Jordan Harris	D	33	3	18	21	20
Grant Jozefek	RW	30	8	10	18	10
Matt Demelis	F	34	8	5	13	4
John Picking	F	34	5	6	11	10
Jayden Struble	D	21	3	7	10	36
Biagio Lerario	C	32	4	3	7	74
Brendan van Riemsdyk	C	33	2	4	6	27
Julian Kislin	D	23	0	6	6	14
T. J. Walsh	LW	20	2	3	5	6
Mike Kesselring	D	34	2	3	5	35
Jérémie Bucheler	D	29	1	4	5	22
Neil Shea	F	33	1	4	5	14
Riley Hughes	RW	34	1	3	4	25
Matt Thomson	LW	29	1	1	2	4
Collin Murphy	D	14	0	1	1	4
Alex Mella	LW	14	0	1	1	0
Craig Pantano	G	34	0	1	1	0
Curtis Frye	G	2	0	1	1	2
Connor Murphy	G	2	0	0	0	0
Billy Carrabino	D	7	0	0	0	4
Tyler Spott	D	3	0	0	0	10
Bench	-	-	-	-	-	10
Total			98	171	269	443

== Goaltending statistics ==
Name	Games	Minutes	Wins	Losses	Ties	Goals against	Saves	Shut outs	SV %	GAA
Craig Pantano	34	1990	18	13	3	83	888	2	.915	2.50
Curtis Frye	1	9	0	0	0	1	2	0	.667	6.47
Connor Murphy	2	42	0	0	0	5	11	0	.688	7.04
Empty Net	-	18	-	-	-	3	-	-	-	-
Total	34	2060	18	13	3	92	901	2	.907	2.68

== Rankings ==
Poll	Week																							
Poll	Pre	1	2	3	4	5	6	7	8	9	10	11	12	13	14	15	16	17	18	19	20	21	22	23 (Final)
USCHO.com	15	15	15	11	10	13	14	13	12	8	12	12	12	11	12	14	13	12	12	10	13	16	19	19
USA Today	14	NR	14	11	10	13	14	14	13	12	12	12	12	13	12	14	13	12	12	10	12	NR	NR	NR

== Players drafted into the NHL ==
=== 2020 NHL entry draft ===
Round	Pick	Player	NHL team
2	36	Sam Colangelo†	Anaheim Ducks
7	202	Gunnarwolfe Fontaine†	Nashville Predators
7	203	Chase Bradley†	Detroit Red Wings
7	212	Devon Levi†	Florida Panthers

† incoming freshman
