= 2024–25 UMass Minutemen ice hockey season =

NCAA Tournament, Regional Finals
- Conference: 6th Hockey East
- Home ice: Mullins Center

Rankings
- USCHO: #10
- USA Hockey: #10

Record
- Overall: 21–14–5
- Conference: 10–9–5
- Home: 9–6–3
- Road: 9–5–2
- Neutral: 3–3–0

Coaches and captains
- Head coach: Greg Carvel
- Assistant coaches: Tom Upton; Nolan Gluchowski
- Captain: Linden Alger
- Alternate captain(s): Ryan Lautenbach; Lucas Mercuri

The 2024–25 UMass Minutemen ice hockey season was the 93rd season of play for the program, the 32nd at the Division I level, and 31st in Hockey East. The Minutemen represented the University of Massachusetts Amherst in the 2024–25 NCAA Division I men's ice hockey season, played their home games at Mullins Center and were coached by Greg Carvel, in his 9th season.

== Season ==
Massachusetts entered the season with a significant number of changes to the lineup with the biggest losses coming on the blueline. The departure of six defensemen, including the pair that finished in the top three of team scoring, would be difficult to replace. While the Minutemen still had a few defenders left on the team, they brought in six new faces, four of which were freshmen, and began rebuilding their defensive corps. The rest of the team saw minor alterations with only a handful of depth forwards and the team's backup netminder leave. As such, it would be incumbent on those departments to hold up while the defense not only learned the system of play but built up a rapport amongst themselves and the rest of the squad.

The early part of the season didn't go so well for UMass. The team was met with inconsistency in goal from Michael Hrabal who seemed almost incapable of putting two good games together. The offense was much more reliable, managing to find the net regularaly thanks largely to the efforts of two players. Aydar Suniev progressed well in his sophomore season and was rounding into a form as a big-time scorer. However, the Minutemen received their biggest boost from Cole O'Hara. After two unimpressive campaigns, the Nashville Predators draft pick exploded out of the gate, scoring in each of the team's first eight games. He remained a consistent threat for the duration of the year and would not only lead UMass in scoring by a wide margin but would finish in the top 10 scorers for the entire country.

After riding through the rough patch in the first six weeks of the season, Hrabal was benched for a game against Providence in November. While the team lost, they did receive a solid performance from backup Jackson Irving. The move seemed to focus Hrabel, who started the following match and followed that with a string of much more consistent play. The up and down stretch to start the season caused the team to drop out of the national polls by the end of the first half of their schedule, however, because Hockey East was the top-ranked conference in the country, Massachusetts would have plenty of opportunities to earn their way back to the NCAA tournament.

Hrabal left the team during the winter break to take part in the World Junior Championships, which gave Irving a chance to show what he could do. The Minutemen ended up finishing third in the Desert Hockey Classic after surrendering a lead in the third period to Cornell. Irving responded with a shutout the following night but his overall performance didn't force the team to rethink their goaltending situation and Hrabal remained the starter for the remainder of the season. That choice ended up paying off for the Minutemen as Hrabal was the picture of consistency for the rest of the regular season. Over the final 17 games, only once did UMass not win a game where they scored 3 goals. With O'Hara and Suniev still firing on all cylinders, the Minutemen's offense was able to take advantage of the solid goaltending and win the vast majority of their games. Massachusetts went 10–4–3 which included victories over some of the highest-ranked teams in the country. As the wins continued to pile up, UMass climbed their way back into the playoff picture, returning to the polls by late January and then climbing into the top-16 of the PairWise rankings. UMass was so good in the back half of the year they even managed to get into the top-10, which put them into a guaranteed at-large position heading into the postseason.

=== Playoffs ===
While UMass had been dominant in the second half of the year, their poor first half caused the team to finish 6th in the conference standings and forced them to begin their title hunt in the opening round of the conference tournament. Vermont arrived for the final UMass home game of the year and fought hard against the Minutemen. Though Massachusetts was able to get the first two goals of the game, the Catamounts responded quickly with one of their own. For the final 45 minutes of the match, Vermont attacked the UMass cage, desperately searching for the tying goal, but Hrabal turned aside everything sent his way. The 2–1 victory sent Massachusetts into the quarterfinals, where they encountered stiffer competition in the form of #9 Boston University. The Terriers opened the scoring early and it took nearly a period before Jack Musa could tie the game. After getting the second lead of the night, BU carried their advantage deep into the third. UMass, now fighting their own desperate battle, ramped up their offensive game in the third, firing more shots on goal than they had in the first two periods combined. The near-constant pressure worked when Suniev tied the match, but the offense was unable to find a follow-up in the remaining 9 minutes and the match headed into overtime. The pace was fast in the extra session, with UMass getting a pair of glorious chances. Unfortunately, BU was able to capitalize on a 2-on-1 less than 3 minutes in and knocked the Minutemen out of the tournament.

While the loss did cause UMass to drop in the PairWise, they only slipped to 11th, meaning that it would take upsets in four separate conference tournament for them to miss out on the postseason. However, a week later that point was rendered moot when the results of the championship weekend allowed UMass to rise back up into the #10 position, giving the club not only an at-large bid but a #3 seed as well. Unfortunately for the Minutemen, the team found itself placed in the Fargo Regional, forcing it to participate in the bracket furthest away from its campus and giving the other three teams a distinct advantage in the partisanship of the crowd. With their opponent being Minnesota for the opening match, the Minutemen played what was essentially a road game and the Gophers looked to take full advantage. Though Minnesota opened the scoring, Larry Keenan was able to respond with a tying goal just 20 seconds later. As they had against BU, the offense sputtered for the first two periods and allowed two additional Minnesota goals to go unanswered. Down by a pair entering the third, the Minutemen once against tried to awaken their offense in the final frame. UMass started taking charge with a massive offensive effort as well as the referees swallowing their whistles and Suniev broke through past the 7-minte mark of the period. Less than 2 minutes later, Daniel Jenčko took advantage of an equipment malfunction that forced Minnesota to swap goaltenders and tied the score off of a deflection. Minnesota tried to get its offense back in gear, now needing another goal to win, but Massachusetts continued to control the balance of play. With just under 5 minutes to play, Francesco Dell'Elce tried to find Musa down low but his pass was blocked, instead, a Minnesota player deflected the puck directly into his own net, giving the Minutemen their first lead of the night. However, the Gophers were able to tie the score less than 80 seconds later, forcing the two to settle the game in overtime. Both teams tied to end the game early with scoring chances coming fast and furious. After turning the puck over at center ice, Dans Ločmelis found Suniev back-door for a tap-in to win the game.

Two days later, UMass was set to face Western Michigan and they got off to a good start when Ločmelis opened the scoring less than 9 minutes into the match. Unfortunately for the Minutmen, that was the only goal they would manage for the evening. The team struggled mightily to solve the Broncos' netminder and failed every time over the final 50 minutes of the match. To make matters worse, Suniev was called for a major penalty late in the second period and Western wasted no time taking advantage. After tying the game just 22 seconds into the power play, the Broncos took the lead in the final minute of the man-advantage. UMass was even gifted their own 5-minute power play shortly afterwards but they failed and finished the game with no goals on 9 full minutes of power play time.

== Departures ==
Player	Position	Nationality	Cause
Aaron Bohlinger	Defenseman	United States	Graduate transfer to Quinnipiac
Cole Brady	Goaltender	Canada	Graduation (retired)
Eric DeDobbelaer	Goaltender	United States	Transferred to Robert Morris
Liam Gorman	Forward	United States	Graduation (signed with Allen Americans)
Taylor Makar	Forward	Canada	Transferred to Maine
Elliott McDermott	Defenseman	Canada	Graduate transfer to Rensselaer
Scott Morrow	Defenseman	United States	Signed professional contract (Carolina Hurricanes)
Samuli Niinisaari	Defenseman	Finland	Graduation (signed with SaiPa)
Christian Sanda	Forward	United States	Graduation (retired)
Kazimier Sobieski	Defenseman	United States	Left mid-season; returned to juniors (Youngstown Phantoms)
Sebastian Törnqvist	Defenseman	Sweden	Transferred to Vermont
Ryan Ufko	Defenseman	United States	Signed professional contract (Nashville Predators)
Lucas Vanroboys	Forward	Canada	Graduation (signed with San Jose Barracuda)

== Recruiting ==
Player	Position	Nationality	Age	Notes
Francesco Dell'Elce	Defenseman	Canada	19	King City, ON
James Duerr	Forward	United States	20	Chicago, IL
Cam Dunn	Forward	United States	20	Holland, MI
Daniel Jenčko	Forward	Slovakia	19	Humenné, SVK
Larry Keenan	Defenseman	Canada	19	Midhurst, ON; selected 117th overall in 2023
Charlie Lieberman	Defenseman	United States	20	Naperville, IL
Finn Loftus	Defenseman	United States	20	Blaine, MN
Joey Musa	Forward	United States	24	Orange Park, FL; transfer from Dartmouth
James Norton	Goaltender	Canada	21	Scarborough, ON
Lucas Ölvestad	Defenseman	Sweden	22	Tampa, FL; transfer from Denver
Kazimier Sobieski	Defenseman	United States	20	Deerfield, MA

== Roster ==
As of September 17, 2024.

No.	Nat.	Player	Class	Pos	Height	Weight	DoB	Hometown	Previous team	NHL rights
1	(United States)	Jackson Irving	Sophomore	G	6' 0" (1.83 m)	172 lb (78 kg)	2004-02-03	Newbury, Massachusetts	Sioux Falls Stampede (USHL)	—
3	(United States)	Kazimier Sobieski	Freshman	D	6' 1" (1.85 m)	181 lb (82 kg)	2004-04-12	Deerfield, Massachusetts	Sioux Falls Stampede (USHL)	—
4	(United States)	Kennedy O'Connor	Junior	D	6' 2" (1.88 m)	194 lb (88 kg)	2001-05-10	Springfield, Massachusetts	Omaha Lancers (USHL)	—
5	(United States)	Linden Alger (C)	Graduate	D	6' 3" (1.91 m)	194 lb (88 kg)	2000-04-09	Centerville, Massachusetts	Youngstown Phantoms (USHL)	—
6	(Sweden)	Lucas Ölvestad	Junior	D	6' 1" (1.85 m)	190 lb (86 kg)	2002-03-19	Stockholm, Sweden	Denver (NCHC)	—
7	(United States)	Finn Loftus	Freshman	D	6' 1" (1.85 m)	179 lb (81 kg)	2004-02-12	Blaine, Minnesota	Sioux City Musketeers (USHL)	—
8	(United States)	Cam O'Neill	Sophomore	F	6' 0" (1.83 m)	183 lb (83 kg)	2004-01-24	Odenton, Maryland	Tri-City Storm (USHL)	OTT, 143rd overall 2022
9	(United States)	Jack Musa	Sophomore	F	5' 9" (1.75 m)	157 lb (71 kg)	2003-07-22	Orange Park, Florida	Cedar Rapids RoughRiders (USHL)	—
10	(Latvia)	Dans Ločmelis	Sophomore	F	6' 0" (1.83 m)	170 lb (77 kg)	2004-01-21	Jelgava, Latvia	Luleå J20 (J20 Nationell)	BOS, 119th overall 2022
11	(Canada)	Lucas Mercuri (A)	Senior	F	6' 3" (1.91 m)	192 lb (87 kg)	2002-03-07	Montreal, Quebec	Des Moines Buccaneers (USHL)	CAR, 159th overall 2020
12	(United States)	Cam Dunn	Freshman	F	6' 2" (1.88 m)	170 lb (77 kg)	2003-10-08	Holland, Michigan	Odessa Jackalopes (NAHL)	—
13	(United States)	Joey Musa	Graduate	F	5' 9" (1.75 m)	160 lb (73 kg)	2000-06-11	Orange Park, Florida	Dartmouth (ECAC)	—
14	(United States)	Ryan Lautenbach (A)	Senior	F	5' 11" (1.8 m)	175 lb (79 kg)	2000-02-27	Brighton, Michigan	Omaha Lancers (USHL)	—
16	(Russia)	Aydar Suniev	Sophomore	F	6' 2" (1.88 m)	205 lb (93 kg)	2004-11-16	Kazan, Russia	Penticton Vees (BCHL)	CGY, 80th overall 2023
17	(United States)	Kenny Connors	Junior	F	6' 1" (1.85 m)	190 lb (86 kg)	2003-03-10	Glen Mills, Pennsylvania	Dubuque Fighting Saints (USHL)	LAK, 103rd overall 2022
18	(Canada)	Larry Keenan	Freshman	D	6' 3" (1.91 m)	185 lb (84 kg)	2005-03-15	Midhurst, Ontario	Penticton Vees (BCHL)	DET, 117th overall 2024
19	(Canada)	Cole O'Hara	Junior	F	6' 0" (1.83 m)	183 lb (83 kg)	2002-06-20	Richmond Hill, Ontario	Tri-City Storm (USHL)	NSH, 114th overall 2022
20	(United States)	James Duerr	Freshman	F	6' 2" (1.88 m)	190 lb (86 kg)	2004-09-01	Chicago, Illinois	Green Bay Gamblers	—
21	(United States)	Charlie Lieberman	Freshman	D	5' 11" (1.8 m)	187 lb (85 kg)	2003-05-22	Naperville, Illinois	Omaha Lancers (USHL)	—
22	(United States)	Nick Van Tassell	Sophomore	F	6' 4" (1.93 m)	196 lb (89 kg)	2004-04-18	Basking Ridge, New Jersey	Green Bay Gamblers (USHL)	OTT, 215th overall 2023
23	(Canada)	Francesco Dell'Elce	Freshman	D	6' 0" (1.83 m)	181 lb (82 kg)	2005-01-09	King City, Ontario	Penticton Vees (BCHL)	—
25	(Slovakia)	Daniel Jenčko	Freshman	F	5' 9" (1.75 m)	165 lb (75 kg)	2005-01-09	Humenné, Slovakia	Youngstown Phantoms (USHL)	—
26	(Canada)	Owen Murray	Junior	D	5' 10" (1.78 m)	181 lb (82 kg)	2002-12-01	Decker, Manitoba	Green Bay Gamblers (USHL)	—
27	(United States)	Michael Cameron	Junior	F	5' 10" (1.78 m)	174 lb (79 kg)	2002-07-24	Berwyn, Pennsylvania	Omaha Lancers (USHL)	—
28	(United States)	Bo Cosman	Sophomore	F	6' 3" (1.91 m)	192 lb (87 kg)	2002-01-18	Milton, Georgia	Minnesota Wilderness (NAHL)	—
30	(Czech Republic)	Michael Hrabal	Sophomore	G	6' 6" (1.98 m)	209 lb (95 kg)	2005-01-20	Prague, Czech Republic	Omaha Lancers (USHL)	UTA, 38th overall 2023
32	(Canada)	James Norton	Freshman	G	6' 4" (1.93 m)	183 lb (83 kg)	2003-04-16	Scarborough, Ontario	Cedar Rapids RoughRiders (USHL)	—

== Standings ==
2024–25 Hockey East Standings
	Conference record										Overall record					
	GP	W	L	T	OTW	OTL	SW	PTS	GF	GA	GP	W	L	T	GF	GA
#4 Boston College †	24	18	4	2	2	0	1	55	82	40	37	27	8	2	125	65
#8 Maine *	24	13	5	6	1	1	5	50	67	45	38	24	8	6	124	75
#2 Boston University	24	14	8	2	1	1	2	46	89	65	40	24	14	2	150	119
#7 Connecticut	24	12	8	4	3	2	1	40	76	65	39	23	12	4	130	97
#13 Providence	24	11	8	5	2	2	1	39	65	67	37	21	11	5	103	96
#10 Massachusetts	24	10	9	5	0	0	2	37	69	58	40	21	14	5	133	97
Massachusetts Lowell	24	8	13	3	0	1	2	30	57	69	36	16	16	4	93	101
Merrimack	24	9	14	1	1	0	1	28	57	81	35	13	21	1	81	112
Northeastern	24	7	14	3	1	1	2	26	48	71	37	14	20	3	88	112
New Hampshire	24	5	14	5	0	2	1	23	53	73	35	13	16	6	96	100
Vermont	24	6	16	2	2	3	1	22	59	88	35	11	21	3	100	116
Championship: March 21, 2025 † indicates regular season champion * indicates conference tournament champion (Lamoriello Trophy); Rankings: USCHO Division I Men's Poll

== Schedule and results ==
Date	Time	Opponent^{#}	Rank^{#}	Site	TV	Decision	Result	Attendance	Record
Regular Season
October 5	7:00 pm	at Bentley*	#14	Bentley Arena • Waltham, Massachusetts	FloHockey	Hrabal	W 5–4	2,143	1–0–0
October 6	3:00 pm	Rensselaer*	#14	Mullins Center • Amherst, Massachusetts (Exhibition)	ESPN+		L 1–2 ^{OT}		
Ice Breaker Tournament
October 11	7:00 pm	vs. #15 Omaha*	#14	Orleans Arena • Las Vegas, Nevada (Ice Breaker Semifinal)		Hrabal	L 2–3 ^{OT}	2,143	1–1–0
October 12	7:00 pm	vs. Air Force*	#14	Orleans Arena • Las Vegas, Nevada (Ice Breaker Consolation)		Hrabal	W 5–1	1,922	2–1–0
October 18	7:00 pm	Sacred Heart*	#15	Mullins Center • Amherst, Massachusetts	ESPN+	Hrabal	L 3–4	6,022	2–2–0
October 19	7:00 pm	at Sacred Heart*	#15	Martire Family Arena • Fairfield, Connecticut	FloHockey	Hrabal	W 6–1	3,940	3–2–0
October 25	7:00 pm	Connecticut	#15	Mullins Center • Amherst, Massachusetts	ESPN+	Hrabal	T 3–3 ^{SOW}	8,412	3–2–1 (0–0–1)
October 26	7:00 pm	at Connecticut	#15	Toscano Family Ice Forum • Storrs, Connecticut	ESPN+	Hrabal	L 2–3	2,424	3–3–1 (0–1–1)
November 2	1:00 pm	at American International*	#17	MassMutual Center • Springfield, Massachusetts	FloHockey	Hrabal	W 4–3	678	4–3–1
November 8	7:00 pm	at Vermont	#18	Gutterson Fieldhouse • Burlington, Vermont	ESPN+	Hrabal	T 3–3 ^{SOL}	2,558	4–3–2 (0–1–2)
November 9	7:00 pm	at Vermont	#18	Gutterson Fieldhouse • Burlington, Vermont	ESPN+	Hrabal	L 0–4	2,903	4–4–2 (0–2–2)
November 14	7:00 pm	#10 Providence		Mullins Center • Amherst, Massachusetts	ESPN+	Irving	L 1–2	4,356	4–5–2 (0–3–2)
November 16	6:00 pm	at #10 Providence		Schneider Arena • Providence, Rhode Island	ESPN+	Hrabal	W 5–1	2,851	5–5–2 (1–3–2)
November 22	7:00 pm	Harvard*	#20	Mullins Center • Amherst, Massachusetts	ESPN+	Hrabal	W 5–3	5,126	6–5–2
November 24	3:00 pm	Vermont	#20	Mullins Center • Amherst, Massachusetts	ESPN+	Hrabal	L 2–3	3,368	6–6–2 (1–4–2)
November 29	4:00 pm	Army*		Mullins Center • Amherst, Massachusetts	ESPN+	Hrabal	W 3–1	3,235	7–6–2
December 7	6:00 pm	at #11 Boston University		Agganis Arena • Boston, Massachusetts	ESPN+	Hrabal	W 4–0	5,072	8–6–2 (2–4–2)
December 11	7:00 pm	#13 Boston University		Mullins Center • Amherst, Massachusetts	ESPN+, NESN, TSN+	Hrabal	L 2–4	4,649	8–7–2 (2–5–2)
December 28	6:00 pm	Simon Fraser*		Mullins Center • Amherst, Massachusetts (Exhibition)	ESPN+	Irving	W 4–3		
Desert Hockey Classic
January 3	5:00 pm	vs. #16 Cornell*		Mullett Arena • Tempe, Arizona (Desert Hockey Classic Semifinal)		Irving	L 2–4	1,832	8–8–2
January 4	5:00 pm	vs. Robert Morris*		Mullett Arena • Tempe, Arizona (Desert Hockey Classic)		Irving	W 8–0	1,298	9–8–2
January 10	7:00 pm	at Northeastern		Matthews Arena • Boston, Massachusetts	ESPN+, NESN	Hrabal	W 5–0	4,405	10–8–2 (3–5–2)
January 11	6:00 pm	Northeastern		Mullins Center • Amherst, Massachusetts	ESPN+	Hrabal	L 0–3	4,078	10–9–2 (3–6–2)
January 17	7:00 pm	at Merrimack		J. Thom Lawler Rink • North Andover, Massachusetts	ESPN+	Hrabal	L 2–3	2,635	10–10–2 (3–7–2)
January 18	6:00 pm	Merrimack		Mullins Center • Amherst, Massachusetts	ESPN+	Irving	W 3–2	3,593	11–10–2 (4–7–2)
January 24	7:00 pm	Alaska*		Mullins Center • Amherst, Massachusetts	ESPN+	Hrabal	W 4–2	3,058	12–10–2
January 25	6:00 pm	Alaska*		Mullins Center • Amherst, Massachusetts	ESPN+	Hrabal	W 7–3	3,263	13–10–2
January 31	7:00 pm	Merrimack	#20	Mullins Center • Amherst, Massachusetts	ESPN+	Hrabal	W 4–2	5,199	14–10–2 (5–7–2)
February 2	4:00 pm	at #6 Maine	#20	Alfond Arena • Orono, Maine	ESPN+	Hrabal	L 2–3	4,689	14–11–2 (5–8–2)
February 7	4:00 pm	at #11 Connecticut	#18	Toscano Family Ice Forum • Storrs, Connecticut	ESPN+	Hrabal	W 5–4	2,691	15–11–2 (6–8–2)
February 14	7:00 pm	at #1 Boston College	#16	Conte Forum • Chestnut Hill, Massachusetts	ESPN+	Hrabal	W 3–2	6,608	16–11–2 (7–8–2)
February 15	6:00 pm	#1 Boston College	#16	Mullins Center • Amherst, Massachusetts	ESPN+	Hrabal	L 1–4	7,606	16–12–2 (7–9–2)
February 21	7:00 pm	at New Hampshire	#16	Whittemore Center • Durham, New Hampshire	ESPN+	Hrabal	T 3–3 ^{SOL}	5,726	16–12–3 (7–9–3)
February 22	6:00 pm	New Hampshire	#16	Mullins Center • Amherst, Massachusetts	ESPN+	Hrabal	W 3–1	6,144	17–12–3 (8–9–3)
February 27	7:00 pm	#16 Massachusetts Lowell	#17	Mullins Center • Amherst, Massachusetts	ESPN+	Hrabal	T 2–2 ^{SOW}	3,845	17–12–4 (8–9–4)
March 1	6:05 pm	at #16 Massachusetts Lowell	#17	Tsongas Center • Lowell, Massachusetts	ESPN+	Hrabal	W 5–3	6,552	18–12–4 (9–9–4)
March 7	7:00 pm	#5 Maine	#16	Mullins Center • Amherst, Massachusetts	ESPN+, NESN	Hrabal	W 5–1	6,251	19–12–4 (10–9–4)
March 8	7:30 pm	#5 Maine	#16	Mullins Center • Amherst, Massachusetts	ESPN+	Hrabal	T 2–2 ^{SOL}	5,182	19–12–5 (10–9–5)
Hockey East Tournament
March 12	7:00 pm	Vermont*	#14	Mullins Center • Amherst, Massachusetts (Hockey East Opening Round)	ESPN+, NESN	Hrabal	W 2–1	3,670	20–12–5
March 15	4:30 pm	at #9 Boston University*	#14	Agganis Arena • Boston, Massachusetts (Hockey East Quarterfinals)	ESPN+, NESN+	Hrabal	L 2–3 ^{OT}	5,563	20–13–5
NCAA Tournament
March 27	8:30 pm	vs. #5 Minnesota*	#13	Scheels Arena • Fargo, North Dakota (Regional Semifinal)	ESPN2	Hrabal	W 5–4 ^{OT}		21–13–5
March 29	5:30 pm	vs. #3 Western Michigan*	#13	Scheels Arena • Fargo, North Dakota (Regional Final)	ESPNU	Hrabal	L 1–2	4,329	21–14–5
*Non-conference game. ^{#}Rankings from USCHO.com Poll. All times are in Eastern Time. Source:

== Scoring statistics ==
Name	Position	Games	Goals	Assists	Points	PIM
Cole O'Hara	RW	40	22	29	51	14
Aydar Suniev	LW/RW	35	20	18	38	41
Jack Musa	F	40	18	17	35	4
Dans Ločmelis	C	40	8	25	33	8
Lucas Mercuri	C/RW	40	10	21	31	24
Kenny Connors	C	40	10	19	29	6
Francesco Dell'Elce	D	40	7	17	24	12
Ryan Lautenbach	LW/RW	40	6	15	21	19
Lucas Ölvestad	D	38	4	16	20	22
Daniel Jenčko	C/LW	28	6	11	17	10
Owen Murray	D	40	5	9	14	16
Larry Keenan	D	40	4	7	11	16
Linden Alger	D	40	3	7	10	10
Michael Cameron	C	21	3	4	7	4
Kennedy O'Connor	D	34	0	6	6	8
James Duerr	RW	31	2	3	5	6
Nick VanTassell	C	37	2	2	4	11
Cam O'Neill	RW	27	2	1	3	23
Joey Musa	F	33	1	2	3	6
Bo Cosman	F	30	0	3	3	10
Jackson Irving	G	5	0	1	1	0
Finn Loftus	D	31	0	1	1	4
Michael Hrabal	G	36	0	0	0	0
Kazimier Sobieski	D	5	0	0	0	2
Cam Dunn	C	6	0	0	0	0
Total			108	185	293	331

== Goaltending statistics ==
Name	Games	Minutes	Wins	Losses	Ties	Goals against	Saves	Shut outs	SV %	GAA
Jackson Irving	7	280:40	2	2	0	7	116	1	.943	1.50
Michael Hrabal	35	2070:33	19	12	5	82	1000	2	.924	2.38
Empty Net	-	25:39	-	-	-	6	-	-	-	-
Total	40	2376:52	21	14	5	95	1116	3	.917	2.40

== Rankings ==
Poll	Week																											
Poll	Pre	1	2	3	4	5	6	7	8	9	10	11	12	13	14	15	16	17	18	19	20	21	22	23	24	25	26	27 (Final)
USCHO.com	14	14	15	15	17	18	RV	20	RV	RV	RV	RV	–	RV	RV	RV	RV	20	18	16	16	17	16	14	14	13	–	10
USA Hockey	14	14	17	15	17	17	20	RV	RV	RV	RV	RV	–	RV	RV	RV	RV	20	18	16	16	14	14	14	14	11	10	10

Note: USCHO did not release a poll in week 12 or 26.
Note: USA Hockey did not release a poll in week 12.

== Awards and honors ==
Player	Award	Ref
Cole O'Hara	AHCA All-American East First Team	
Cole O'Hara	All-Hockey East First Team	
Michael Hrabal	All-Hockey East Third Team	
Francesco Dell'Elce	Hockey East All-Rookie Team	

== 2025 NHL entry draft ==
Round	Pick	Player	NHL team
1	25	Václav Nestrašil ^{†}	Chicago Blackhawks
3	77	Francesco Dell'Elce	Colorado Avalanche
3	82	Arseni Radkov ^{†}	Montreal Canadiens

† incoming freshman
