= Warren Norris =

Canadian ice hockey player

- Born: 19 September 1974 (age 51) St. John's, Newfoundland, Canada
- Height: 6 ft 1 in (185 cm)
- Weight: 185 lb (84 kg; 13 st 3 lb)
- Position: Centre
- Shot: Left
- Played for: St. John's Maple Leafs; Grand Rapids Griffins; Michigan K-Wings; Sheffield Steelers; Slovan Bratislava; Graz 99ers Lugano; KAC
- NHL draft: Undrafted
- Playing career: 1996–2011

Warren Norris (born 19 September 1974) is a Canadian former professional ice hockey centre who last played for EC KAC in the Austrian Hockey League. He has previously played in the American Hockey League (AHL) and the International Hockey League (IHL) in North America and in the British Ice Hockey Superleague, the Slovak Extraliga and the Swiss Nationalliga A. He has also played two seasons with the touring Canadian national ice hockey team.

== Playing career ==
Whilst playing for the UMass Minutemen at the University of Massachusetts Amherst in 1996–97, Norris signed with the St. John's Maple Leafs of the AHL as a free agent. He also played for St. John's the following season, 1997–98, before he joined the Grand Rapids Griffins in the IHL for the 1998–99 and 1999–00 seasons. However, Norris only played a handful of games for Grand Rapids as he spent the majority of those seasons with the Canadian touring team for whom he made 78 appearances.

In 2000, Norris went to the United Kingdom where he joined the Sheffield Steelers for the 2000–01 ISL season. During this season, Norris helped Sheffield win a Grand Slam of all available trophies when they won the Benson & Hedges Cup, the Challenge Cup, the league championship and the playoffs. The following season, 2001–02, Norris joined Slovan Bratislava in the Slovak Extraliga before rejoining Sheffield for the 2002–03 season. During his second spell with Sheffield, Norris again helped them to win the Challenge Cup and the league championship.

Norris signed for the Graz 99ers in the Austrian Hockey League for the 2003–04 season. Playing for Graz for three seasons, he was the club's top point scorer in the 2003–04 and 2004–05 seasons and the club's and the league's top goal scorer in 2004–05. Norris finished the 2005–06 season playing one game for Lugano in the Swiss Nationalliga A playoffs before he returned to the Austrian Hockey League to play for the EC KAC in 2006–07. After three years with EC KAC, Norris signed with League rival Graz 99ers on 23 April 2009 for the 2009–10 season.

== Personal life ==
Norris is the younger brother of the former National Hockey League player Dwayne Norris and the uncle of Buffalo Sabres forward Josh Norris.

== Records ==
- Most points (54) in 2003–04 for Graz 99ers.
- Most goals (40) in the 2004–05 Austrian Hockey League season.
- Most goals (40) and most points (67) in 2004–05 for Graz 99ers.

== Career statistics ==
			Regular season					Playoffs				
Season	Team	League	GP	G	A	Pts	PIM	GP	G	A	Pts	PIM
1993–94	UMass Amherst	NCAA	29	20	27	46	12	—	—	—	—	—
1994–95	UMass Amherst	NCAA	35	13	8	21	34	—	—	—	—	—
1995–96	UMass Amherst	NCAA	33	20	20	40	64	—	—	—	—	—
1996–97	UMass Amherst	NCAA	35	20	26	46	48	—	—	—	—	—
1996–97	St. John's Maple Leafs	AHL	9	1	0	1	4	—	—	—	—	—
1997–98	St John's Maple Leafs	AHL	35	2	2	4	4	—	—	—	—	—
1998–99	Grand Rapids Griffins	IHL	4	0	0	0	0	—	—	—	—	—
1999–00	Grand Rapids Griffins	IHL	3	0	0	0	0	—	—	—	—	—
1999–00	Michigan K-Wings	IHL	8	1	2	3	0	—	—	—	—	—
2000–01	Sheffield Steelers	ISL	48	11	13	24	85	8	1	5	6	4
2001–02	Slovan Bratislava	Slovak Extraliga	46	6	12	18	14	16	2	3	5	12
2002–03	Sheffield Steelers	ISL	32	11	13	24	32	13	2	5	7	12
2003–04	Graz 99ers	Austrian	48	22	32	54	103	3	0	1	1	12
2004–05	Graz 99ers	Austrian	44	40	27	67	60	—	—	—	—	—
2005–06	Graz 99ers	Austrian	31	14	17	31	46	—	—	—	—	—
2005–06	Lugano	Nationalliga A	—	—	—	—	—	1	0	0	0	0
2006–07	KAC	Austrian	49	15	27	42	89	—	—	—	—	—
2007–08	KAC	Austrian	49	24	26	50	83	—	—	—	—	—
2008–09	KAC	Austrian	51	14	20	34	22	—	—	—	—	—

== International play ==
Played for Canada in:

- 1998–99 touring team
- 1999–00 touring team

=== International statistics ===
Year	Team	Comp	GP	G	A	Pts	PIM
1998–99	Canada	Int'l	48	13	21	34	38
1999–00	Canada	Int'l	25	3	16	19	8
Totals			73	16	37	53	46
