= Jeremy Bonomo =

American soccer coach

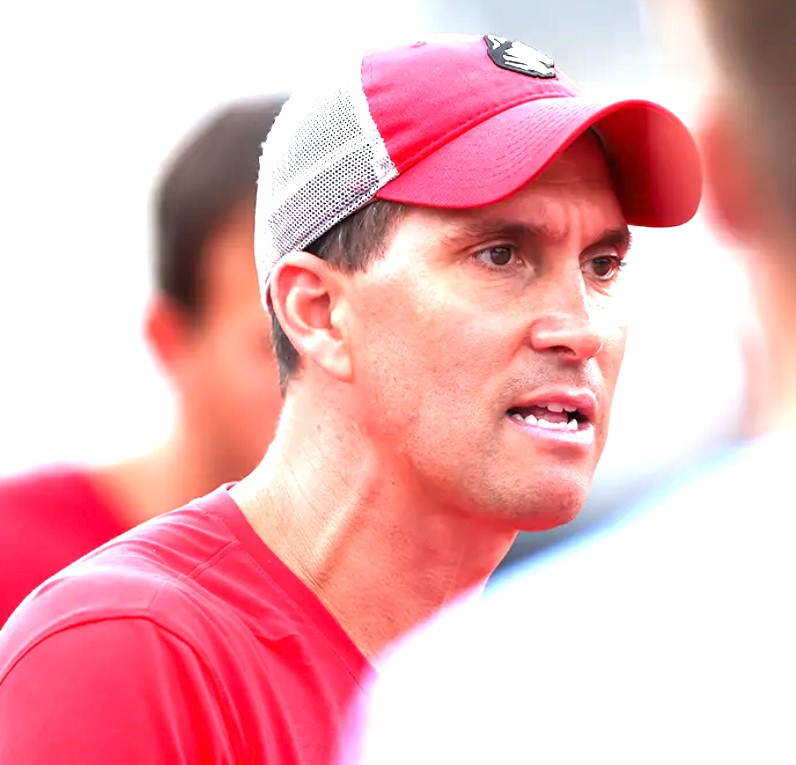

Current position
- Title: Head coach
- Team: Northeastern Huskies
- Conference: Coastal Athletic Association

Biographical details
- Born: May 6, 1980 (age 46); Pelham, New Hampshire
- Education: Southern New Hampshire BS, MBA

Playing career
- 1998–2002: Southern New Hampshire
- 2003: Cape Cod Crusaders
- 2005: Western Mass Pioneers

Coaching career (HC unless noted)
- 2005–2006: Southern New Hampshire (assistant)
- 2007–2009: Assumption
- 2010–2014: Cincinnati (assistant)
- 2014–2023: Wisconsin-Green Bay
- 2024–: Northeastern

Head coaching record
- Overall: 89–100–52 (.477)

Accomplishments and honors

Championships
- Horizon Regular Season: 2017; Horizon League Tournament: 2023

Awards
- Horizon League Coach of the Year: 2017, 2023 Northeast-10 Coach of the Year: 2009

A native of Pelham, New Hampshire, and a graduate of Southern New Hampshire University, Jeremy M. Bonomo is an American soccer coach who currently leads the Northeastern Huskies men's soccer team. Hired in February 2024 as the eighth coach in the program's history, he enters the 2026 campaign as his third season at the helm. Before arriving at Northeastern, Bonomo spent nine seasons in charge of the University of Wisconsin-Green Bay, where he guided the team to the 2023 Horizon League title and an appearance in the NCAA Division I Men's Soccer Tournament that same year.

He played his college soccer at Southern New Hampshire University, graduating in 2002 with a Bachelor of Science in Business Administration and later earning an MBA, all while helping the team capture two league championships during his playing days. He holds a United States Soccer Federation 'A' License.

== Playing career ==
In 2003, Bonomo signed with the Cape Cod Crusaders of the USL PDL League, one of the leading developmental leagues in American soccer at the time. Over the course of his spell with the club, he made ten appearances, gaining valuable competitive experience against strong regional opposition. Two years later, in 2005, he continued his playing career with the Western Mass Pioneers, further adding to his time in the semi-professional ranks before eventually transitioning into coaching.

== Coaching Style and Tactics ==
At the core of Bonomo's philosophy is defensive solidity. Bonomo values discipline, physical fitness, and team spirit, viewing them as the foundation of everything his teams do. His priority is building a squad whose players not only understand the system but also read and react to one another seamlessly — anticipating each other's movements and functioning as a single, cohesive unit rather than a collection of individuals.

Bonomo is known for deploying a 4–2–1–3 or the closely related 4–2–3–1 — anchored by two holding midfielders, with attacking full-backs pushing high and a lone out-and-out striker supported just behind by an attacking, box-to-box midfielder. The full-backs are pivotal at both ends of the pitch, defending diligently while providing width and overlapping support in attack, consistently recording the highest volume of passes during matches. A key feature of Bonomo’s attacking approach is the frequent use of crosses from both full-backs and wide midfielders, creating goal-scoring opportunities through overlapping runs, wide combinations, and deliveries into the penalty area. The midfielders are tasked with driving quick transitions from defense to attack and operating creatively as deep-lying playmakers who dictate tempo. The result is an adaptable side that balances defensive solidity with dynamic, purposeful attacking play.

Bonomo's team favors a direct approach to possession, bypassing midfield to feed the forward early and reaching goal in as few passes as possible — turning defense into attack quickly and efficiently. In fact, direct long passes delivered upfield by a single center-back nearly match, or fall just short of, the total passes made by each full-back.

Out of possession, the side stays compact and disciplined, holding its shape and pouncing on opposition mistakes to spring rapid counters.

Bonomo also demands an aggressive high press, particularly from the front of the team. The striker and attacking midfielder are expected to initiate pressure intensely and force opponents into rushed decisions, while at least one of the holding midfielders steps forward aggressively to support the press and close central passing lanes. This creates a coordinated pressing structure designed to win the ball high up the pitch and generate immediate attacking opportunities.

In attack, it exploits space through quick passing combinations, long balls in behind, and dynamic runs from the forwards and wingers, while also risking ambitious, incisive passes to unlock stubborn defenses.

== Head Coaching Statistics ==
Season	Team	Overall	Conference	Standing	Postseason
Assumption University (Northeast-10) (2007–2009)
2007	Assumption University	6–9–3	4-7-2	10th	
2008	Assumption University	6–7–5	5-4-4	7th	
2009	Assumption University	9–6–0	6-5-2	6th	
Assumption University:		21–22–8 (.490)	15-16-8 (.487)		
University of Wisconsin-Greenbay (Horizon League) (2015–2023)
2015	University of Wisconsin-Greenbay	5–10–3 (.361)	2–5–2 (.333)	8th	
2016	University of Wisconsin-Greenbay	6–10–2 (.389)	4–3–2 (.556)	7th	
2017	University of Wisconsin-Greenbay	9–5–3 (.618)	7–1–1 (.833)	1st	
2018	University of Wisconsin-Greenbay	8–6–2 (.563)	4–3–1 (.563)	4th	
2019	University of Wisconsin-Greenbay	6–7–2 (.467)	4–4–0 (.500)	4th	
2020	University of Wisconsin-Greenbay	3–4–1 (.438)	3–4–1 (.438)	6th	
2021	University of Wisconsin-Greenbay	2–10–4 (.250)	1–7–2 (.200)	11th	
2022	University of Wisconsin-Greenbay	6–3–7 (.594)	2–2–5 (.500)	7th	
2023	University of Wisconsin-Greenbay	10–4–5 (.658)	5–2–2 (.667)	2nd	NCAA First Round
University of Wisconsin-Green Bay:		55–59–29 (.486)	27-29-14 (.486)		
Northeastern (CAA) (2024–2026)
2024	Northeastern	4–5–7 (.469)	2–4–2 (.375)	9th	
2025	Northeastern	4–7–4 (.400)	2–5–1 (.313)	5th(North)	
2026	Northeastern	5–7–4 (.438)	2–4–2 (.375)	4th(North)	
Northeastern University:		13–19–15 (.436)	6-13-5 (.354)		
Total:		89–100–52 (.477)			
National champion Postseason invitational champion Conference regular season champion Conference regular season and conference tournament champion Division regular season champion Division regular season and conference tournament champion Conference tournament champion
