= Jim Madigan =

American ice hockey player, coach, and athletic director (born 1962)

Current position
- Title: Athletic Director
- Team: Northeastern
- Conference: CAA

Biographical details
- Born: August 5, 1962 (age 64); Montreal, Quebec, Canada
- Education: Northeastern University

Playing career
- 1981–1985: Northeastern
- Position: Forward

Coaching career (HC unless noted)
- 1985–1986: Vermont (Assistant)
- 1986–1993: Northeastern (Assistant)
- 1993–2006: New York Islanders (Scout)
- 2006–2011: Pittsburgh Penguins (Amateur Scout)
- 2011–2021: Northeastern

Administrative career (AD unless noted)
- 2021–present: Northeastern

Head coaching record
- Overall: 174–139–39 (.550)
- Tournaments: 0–2 (.000)

Accomplishments and honors

Championships
- Hockey East Tournament Championship (2016, 2019); Beanpot Championship (2018, 2019, 2020)

Jim Madigan (born August 5, 1962) is the current Athletic Director for Northeastern University. He was previously the head coach of the men's ice hockey team for 10 seasons. Madigan was also a player for the Huskies from 1981 to 1985.

== Career at Northeastern ==
- 1981–85 Northeastern University Player
- 1986–93 Northeastern University Assistant Coach
- 1993–99 Northeastern University Assistant Director of Physical Plant Services
- 1999–04 Northeastern University Director of Athletic Development
- 2004–11 Northeastern University Associate Dean and Director of Development of the College of Business Administration
- 2011–21 Northeastern University Head Coach
- 2021–Present Northeastern University Athletic Director

== Head coaching record ==
Record table
Season	Team	Overall	Conference	Standing	Postseason
Northeastern Huskies (Hockey East) (2011–2021)
2011–12	Northeastern	13–16–5	9–14–4	T–8th	
2012–13	Northeastern	9–21–4	5–18–4	10th	
2013–14	Northeastern	19–14–4	10–8–2	5th	Hockey East Quarterfinals
2014–15	Northeastern	16–16–4	11–9–2	6th	Hockey East Opening Round
2015–16	Northeastern	22–14–5	10–8–4	6th	NCAA Midwest Regional semifinals
2016–17	Northeastern	18–15–5	9–10–3	8th	Hockey East Quarterfinals
2017–18	Northeastern	23–10–5	15–6–3	2nd	NCAA Northeast Regional semifinals
2018–19	Northeastern	27–11–1	15–8–1	3rd	NCAA East Regional semifinals
2019–20	Northeastern	18–13–3	11–12–1	7th	Tournament cancelled due to COVID-19
2020–21	Northeastern	9–9–3	9–8–3	6th	Hockey East Quarterfinals
Northeastern:		174–139–39 (.550)	113–107–29 (.512)		
Total:		174–139–39 (.550)			
National champion Postseason invitational champion Conference regular season champion Conference regular season and conference tournament champion Division regular season champion Division regular season and conference tournament champion Conference tournament champion
