= 2019–20 UConn Huskies men's ice hockey season =

- Conference: 5th Hockey East
- Home ice: XL Center

Rankings
- USCHO.com: NR
- USA Today/ US Hockey Magazine: NR

Record
- Overall: 15–15–4
- Conference: 12–10–2
- Home: 7–6–2
- Road: 7–7–1
- Neutral: 1–2–1

Coaches and captains
- Head coach: Mike Cavanaugh
- Assistant coaches: Joe Pereira; Tyler Helton; Matt Michno; Joe Ferriss; Will Moran
- Captain(s): Wyatt Newpower; Benjamin Freeman
- Alternate captain(s): Adam Karashik; Alexander Payusov

The 2019–20 UConn Huskies men's ice hockey season was the 60th season of play for the program, the 22nd at the Division I level, and the 6th season in the Hockey East conference. The Huskies represented the University of Connecticut and were coached by Mike Cavanaugh, in his 7th season.

The Hockey East tournament as well as the NCAA Tournament were canceled due to the COVID-19 pandemic before any games were played.

== Roster ==
As of July 25, 2019.

No.	Nat.	Player	Class	Pos	Height	Weight	DoB	Hometown	Previous team	NHL rights
1	(United States)	Ryan Keane	Freshman	G	5' 9" (1.75 m)	165 lb (75 kg)	1998-03-15	Lewisville, Texas	Jamestown Rebels (NAHL)	—
2	(Russia)	Yan Kuznetsov	Freshman	D	6' 4" (1.93 m)	200 lb (91 kg)	2002-03-21	Murmansk, Russia	Sioux Falls Stampede (USHL)	—
3	(United States)	Adam Karashik (A)	Junior	D	6' 0" (1.83 m)	200 lb (91 kg)	1998-01-15	Ridgefield, Connecticut	Chicago Steel (USHL)	—
4	(United States)	Roman Kinal	Sophomore	D	6' 2" (1.88 m)	190 lb (86 kg)	1998-07-20	Waterford, Michigan	Dubuque Fighting Saints (USHL)	—
5	(United States)	Eric Linell	Freshman	F	6' 0" (1.83 m)	180 lb (82 kg)	1998-09-17	Great Neck, New York	Penticton Vees (BCHL)	—
6	(United States)	Ryan Wheeler	Sophomore	D	5' 10" (1.78 m)	175 lb (79 kg)	1997-08-24	Lancaster, New York	New Jersey Titans (NAHL)	—
7	(Canada)	Jonny Evans	Sophomore	F	5' 8" (1.73 m)	164 lb (74 kg)	1997-05-01	North Delta, British Columbia	Powell River Kings (BCHL)	—
8	(Canada)	Carter Turnbull	Sophomore	F	5' 7" (1.7 m)	180 lb (82 kg)	1998-09-08	Nanaimo, British Columbia	Powell River Kings (BCHL)	—
9	(Canada)	Alexander Payusov (A)	Senior	F	5' 11" (1.8 m)	190 lb (86 kg)	1997-07-26	Montreal, Quebec	Madison Capitols (USHL)	—
10	(Russia)	Vladislav Firstov	Freshman	F	6' 1" (1.85 m)	185 lb (84 kg)	2001-06-19	Yaroslavl, Russia	Waterloo Black Hawks (USHL)	MIN, 42nd overall 2019
11	(Czech Republic)	Jáchym Kondelík	Sophomore	F	6' 5" (1.96 m)	230 lb (104 kg)	1999-12-21	Budějovice, Czech Republic	Muskegon Lumberjacks (USHL)	NSH, 111th overall 2018
13	(United States)	John Wojciechowski	Sophomore	F	6' 3" (1.91 m)	230 lb (104 kg)	1998-02-18	Mamaroneck, New York	Langley Rivermen (BCHL)	—
14	(United States)	Zac Robbins	Junior	F	5' 8" (1.73 m)	175 lb (79 kg)	1996-10-03	Glenview, Illinois	Cedar Rapids Roughriders (USHL)	—
15	(United States)	Jordan Timmons	Sophomore	F	6' 2" (1.88 m)	215 lb (98 kg)	1998-10-25	South Fayette, Pennsylvania	Cedar Rapids RoughRiders (USHL)	—
16	(United States)	Jacob Flynn	Freshman	D	6' 0" (1.83 m)	180 lb (82 kg)	2001-05-26	Bridgewater, Massachusetts	Thayer Academy (USHS–MA)	—
17	(United States)	Marc Gatcomb	Sophomore	F	6' 2" (1.88 m)	195 lb (88 kg)	1999-07-22	Woburn, Massachusetts	The Gunnery (USHS–CT)	—
19	(United States)	Brian Rigali	Junior	F	5' 8" (1.73 m)	185 lb (84 kg)	1997-03-08	Libertyville, Illinois	Sioux City Musketeers (USHL)	—
20	(United States)	Wyatt Newpower (C)	Senior	D	6' 4" (1.93 m)	205 lb (93 kg)	1997-12-09	Hugo, Minnesota	White Bear Lake Area High School (USHS–MN)	—
22	(United States)	Justin Howell	Senior	F	5' 10" (1.78 m)	200 lb (91 kg)	1997-04-26	Saint Paul, Minnesota	Des Moines Buccaneers (USHL)	—
23	(Canada)	Carter Berger	Freshman	D	6' 0" (1.83 m)	200 lb (91 kg)	1999-09-17	North Vancouver, British Columbia	Victoria Grizzlies (BCHL)	FLA, 106th overall 2019
24	(United States)	Benjamin Freeman (C)	Senior	F	6' 5" (1.96 m)	210 lb (95 kg)	1996-01-10	Falmouth, Maine	Connecticut Jr. Rangers (USPHL)	—
27	(Canada)	Harrison Rees	Freshman	D	6' 2" (1.88 m)	170 lb (77 kg)	2000-03-19	Mississauga, Ontario	North York Rangers (OJHL)	—
29	(Canada)	Kale Howarth	Sophomore	F	6' 4" (1.93 m)	205 lb (93 kg)	1997-06-10	Red Deer, Alberta	Trail Smoke Eaters (BCHL)	CBJ, 148th overall 2017
33	(Czech Republic)	Tomáš Vomáčka	Sophomore	G	6' 3" (1.91 m)	185 lb (84 kg)	1999-05-02	Trutnov, Czech Republic	Lincoln Stars (USHL)	NSH, 154th overall 2017
34	(Russia)	Ruslan Iskhakov	Sophomore	F	5' 7" (1.7 m)	165 lb (75 kg)	2000-07-22	Moscow, Russia	Krasnaya Armiya (MHL)	NYI, 43rd overall 2018
35	(England)	Bradley Stone	Junior	G	6' 1" (1.85 m)	195 lb (88 kg)	1996-07-14	London, England	Boston Junior Bruins (USPHL)	—

== Standings ==
2019–20 Hockey East Standings
	Conference record							Overall record					
	GP	W	L	T	PTS	GF	GA	GP	W	L	T	GF	GA
#5 Boston College †	24	17	6	1	35	93	48	34	24	8	2	136	71
#9 Massachusetts	24	14	8	2	30	69	49	34	21	11	2	107	67
#12 Massachusetts–Lowell	24	12	7	5	29	60	60	34	18	10	6	90	79
#15 Maine	24	12	9	3	27	56	56	34	18	11	5	89	75
Connecticut	24	12	10	2	26	71	75	34	15	15	4	102	106
Boston University	24	10	9	5	25	69	64	34	13	13	8	103	98
#19 Northeastern	24	11	12	1	23	66	71	34	18	13	3	98	92
Providence	24	10	11	3	23	70	63	34	16	12	6	102	78
New Hampshire	24	9	12	3	21	54	69	34	15	15	4	91	97
Merrimack	24	7	14	3	17	63	77	34	9	22	3	85	123
Vermont	24	2	18	4	8	44	83	34	5	23	6	59	100
Championship: March 21, 2020 † indicates conference regular season champion * indicates conference tournament champion (Lamoriello Trophy); Rankings: USCHO.com Top 20 Poll

== Schedule and results ==
Date	Time	Opponent^{#}	Rank^{#}	Site	TV	Decision	Result	Attendance	Record
Regular season
October 5	7:05 PM	at Sacred Heart*		Webster Bank Arena • Bridgeport, Connecticut		Vomáčka	T 3–3 ^{OT}	703	0–0–1
October 11	7:05 PM	vs. Army*		XL Center • Hartford, Connecticut		Vomáčka	L 1–2	2,029	0–1–1
October 12	3:35 PM	vs. Rensselaer*		XL Center • Hartford, Connecticut		Vomáčka	L 3–5	2,859	0–2–1
October 18	7:00 PM	at Rensselaer*		Houston Field House • Troy, New York		Vomáčka	W 5–2	2,588	1–2–1
November 1	7:15 PM	at Merrimack		J. Thom Lawler Rink • North Andover, Massachusetts		Vomáčka	W 3–2	1,734	2–2–1 (1–0–0)
November 3	2:05 PM	vs. Merrimack		XL Center • Hartford, Connecticut		Vomáčka	L 2–3	3,387	2–3–1 (1–1–0)
November 8	7:01 PM	at #19 Boston College		Conte Forum • Chestnut Hill, Massachusetts		Vomáčka	L 0–6	5,291	2–4–1 (1–2–0)
November 9	3:31 PM	vs. #19 Boston College		XL Center • Hartford, Connecticut	NESN	Vomáčka	L 1–5	5,112	2–5–1 (1–3–0)
November 15	7:05 PM	vs. #12 Massachusetts–Lowell		XL Center • Hartford, Connecticut		Vomáčka	T 3–3 ^{OT}	2,730	2–5–2 (1–3–1)
November 16	6:05 PM	at #12 Massachusetts–Lowell		Tsongas Center • Lowell, Massachusetts		Vomáčka	W 2–1	4,397	3–5–2 (2–3–1)
November 22	7:05 PM	vs. Providence		XL Center • Hartford, Connecticut		Vomáčka	T 3–3 ^{OT}	3,384	3–5–3 (2–3–2)
November 23	7:00 PM	at Providence		Schneider Arena • Providence, Rhode Island		Vomáčka	L 2–5	2,183	3–6–3 (2–4–2)
November 29	4:05 PM	vs. Miami*		XL Center • Hartford, Connecticut		Vomáčka	W 6–4	3,006	4–6–3 (2–4–2)
November 30	4:05 PM	vs. Miami*		XL Center • Hartford, Connecticut		Vomáčka	W 4–3	2,735	5–6–3 (2–4–2)
December 6	7:05 PM	vs. Vermont		XL Center • Hartford, Connecticut		Vomáčka	W 3–2	2,012	6–6–3 (3–4–2)
December 7	3:35 PM	vs. Vermont		XL Center • Hartford, Connecticut		Vomáčka	W 7–4	2,884	7–6–3 (4–4–2)
Ledyard Bank Classic
December 28	4:02 PM	vs. St. Lawrence*		Thompson Arena • Hanover, New Hampshire (Ledyard Bank Classic)	NESN	Stone	T 2–2 ^{SOW}	3,003	7–6–4 (4–4–2)
December 29	7:02 PM	at Dartmouth*		Thompson Arena • Hanover, New Hampshire (Ledyard Bank Classic)		Vomáčka	L 3–4	2,312	7–7–4 (4–4–2)
January 3	7:05 PM	vs. #12 Northeastern		XL Center • Hartford, Connecticut		Vomáčka	L 2–5	4,027	7–8–4 (4–5–2)
January 7	7:05 PM	vs. Merrimack		XL Center • Hartford, Connecticut		Vomáčka	L 2–6	2,953	7–9–4 (4–6–2)
January 11	7:00 PM	at #12 Providence		Schneider Arena • Providence, Rhode Island		Vomáčka	L 1–2	2,609	7–10–4 (4–7–2)
January 15	7:05 PM	vs. Maine		Webster Bank Arena • Bridgeport, Connecticut	NESN	Vomáčka	W 3–2	559	8–10–4 (5–7–2)
January 18	6:00 PM	at #12 Northeastern		Matthews Arena • Boston, Massachusetts	NESN	Vomáčka	W 3–2 ^{OT}	2,712	9–10–4 (6–7–2)
Connecticut Ice
January 25	4:00 PM	at #17 Quinnipiac*		Webster Bank Arena • Bridgeport, Connecticut (Connecticut Ice Semifinal)	SNY	Vomáčka	L 2–3	5,724	9–11–4 (6–7–2)
January 26	3:30 PM	vs. Yale*		Webster Bank Arena • Bridgeport, Connecticut (Connecticut Ice Third Place)	SNY	Vomáčka	L 2–3	4,631	9–12–4 (6–7–2)
January 31	7:00 PM	at New Hampshire		Whittemore Center • Durham, New Hampshire		Vomáčka	W 7–4	4,671	10–12–4 (7–7–2)
February 1	4:00 PM	New Hampshire		XL Center • Hartford, Connecticut	NESN	Vomáčka	W 7–4	8,211	11–12–4 (8–7–2)
February 14	7:30 PM	at #17 Maine		Alfond Arena • Orono, Maine	WPME	Vomáčka	W 3–2	4,023	12–12–4 (9–7–2)
February 15	7:00 PM	at #17 Maine		Alfond Arena • Orono, Maine	NESN	Vomáčka	L 0–1 ^{OT}	3,876	12–13–4 (9–8–2)
February 21	7:05 PM	vs. Boston University		XL Center • Hartford, Connecticut		Vomáčka	W 4–3 ^{OT}	5,653	13–13–4 (10–8–2)
February 22	7:05 PM	at Boston University		Agganis Arena • Boston, Massachusetts	NESN	Vomáčka	W 6–1	3,808	14–13–4 (11–8–2)
February 28	7:08 PM	at #8 Massachusetts		XL Center • Hartford, Connecticut		Vomáčka	W 3–2	6,666	15–13–4 (12–8–2)
February 29	8:00 PM	at #8 Massachusetts		Mullins Center • Amherst, Massachusetts	NESN+	Vomáčka	L 3–4	5,165	15–14–4 (12–9–2)
March 6	7:15 PM	at #12 Massachusetts–Lowell		Tsongas Center • Lowell, Massachusetts		Vomáčka	L 1–3	4,802	15–15–4 (12–10–2)
Hockey East Tournament
Tournament Cancelled
*Non-conference game. ^{#}Rankings from USCHO.com Poll. All times are in Eastern Time.

== Scoring Statistics ==
Name	Position	Games	Goals	Assists	Points	PIM
Benjamin Freeman	RW/C	33	7	21	28	0
Carter Turnbull	RW	31	12	12	24	8
Vladislav Firstov	LW	34	11	12	23	31
Jáchym Kondelík	C	34	8	15	23	25
Alexander Payusov	RW	33	12	10	22	20
Wyatt Newpower	D	34	3	19	22	20
Ruslan Iskhakov	C	32	9	12	21	26
Jonny Evans	F	27	9	10	19	4
Kale Howarth	LW/C	29	6	10	16	16
Marc Gatcomb	F	34	7	5	12	18
Yan Kuznetsov	D	34	2	9	11	16
Brian Rigali	F	34	5	5	10	2
Carter Berger	D	31	2	8	10	14
Jake Flynn	D	30	2	7	9	8
Harrison Rees	D	34	1	8	9	18
Zac Robbins	F	33	3	4	7	2
Justin Howell	C	32	3	3	6	33
Ryan Wheeler	D	28	0	4	4	6
Adam Karashik	D	33	0	3	3	18
Jordan Timmons	F	19	0	2	2	4
Tomáš Vomáčka	G	33	0	1	1	0
Bradley Stone	G	1	0	0	0	0
Ryan Keane	G	1	0	0	0	0
John Wojciechowski	C	1	0	0	0	0
Eric Linell	RW	14	0	0	0	4
Bench	-	-	-	-	-	10
Total			102	180	282	299

== Goaltending statistics ==
Name	Games	Minutes	Wins	Losses	Ties	Goals against	Saves	Shut outs	SV %	GAA
Ryan Keane	1	9	0	0	0	0	3	0	1.000	0.00
Bradley Stone	1	63	0	0	1	2	21	0	.913	1.89
Tomáš Vomáčka	33	1974	15	15	4	103	910	0	.898	3.13
Empty Net	-	20	-	-	-	1	-	-	-	-
Total	34	2067	15	15	4	106	934	0	.898	3.08

== Rankings ==
Poll	Week																							
Poll	Pre	1	2	3	4	5	6	7	8	9	10	11	12	13	14	15	16	17	18	19	20	21	22	23 (Final)
USCHO.com	NR	NR	NR	NR	NR	NR	NR	NR	NR	NR	NR	NR	NR	NR	NR	NR	NR	NR	NR	NR	NR	NR	NR	NR
USA Today	NR	NR	NR	NR	NR	NR	NR	NR	NR	NR	NR	NR	NR	NR	NR	NR	NR	NR	NR	NR	NR	NR	NR	NR

== Players drafted into the NHL ==
=== 2020 NHL entry draft ===
Round	Pick	Player	NHL team
2	50	Yan Kuznetsov	Calgary Flames
6	157	Nick Capone†	Tampa Bay Lightning

† incoming freshman
