= 2019–20 Merrimack Warriors men's ice hockey season =

- Conference: 10th Hockey East
- Home ice: J. Thom Lawler Rink

Rankings
- USCHO.com: NR
- USA Today/ US Hockey Magazine: NR

Record
- Overall: 9–22–3
- Conference: 7–14–3
- Home: 4–11–2
- Road: 5–11–1
- Neutral: 0–0–0

Coaches and captains
- Head coach: Scott Borek
- Assistant coaches: Josh Ciocco; Dan Jewell; Jim McNiff
- Captain(s): Chase Gresock; Tyler Irvine; Sami Tavernier

The 2019-20 Merrimack Warriors Men's ice hockey season was the 65th season of play for the program, the 31st at the Division I level, and the 31st season in the Hockey East conference. The Warriors represented Merrimack College and were coached by Scott Borek, in his 2nd season.

== Departures ==
Player	Position	Nationality	Cause
Michael Babcock	Forward	United States	Graduation (Signed with Gothiques d'Amiens)
Jackson Bales	Forward	Canada	Left program
Alex Carle	Defenseman	United States	Graduation (Retired)
Ryan Cook	Defenseman	United States	Transferred to Niagara
Logan Coomes	Forward	United States	Transferred to Alaska
Ethan DeStefani	Forward	United States	Returned to juniors (Youngstown Phantoms)
Logan Halladay	Goaltender	United States	Transferred to MSOE
Johnny Kovacevic	Defenseman	Canada	Signed professional contract (Winnipeg Jets)
Simon Lööf	Defenseman	Sweden	Signed professional contract (Kristianstads IK)
Matt McArdle	Defenseman	United States	Graduation (Retired)
Cole McBride	Forward	Canada	Left program
Laine McKay	Forward	Canada	Left program
Chase Olsen	Forward	Canada	Transferred to Toronto
Craig Pantano	Forward	United States	Graduate transfer to Northeastern
Derek Petti	Forward	United States	Graduation (Signed with Adirondack Thunder)
Jeff Solow	Forward	United States	Transferred to Oswego State
Drew Vogler	Goaltender	United States	Graduation (Retired)

== Recruiting ==
Player	Position	Nationality	Age	Notes
Benjamin Brar	Forward	Canada	20	Abbotsford, BC
Declan Carlile	Defenseman	United States	19	Flint, MI
Joey Cassetti	Forward	United States	20	Pleasanton, CA
James Corcoran	Goaltender	United States	21	Walpole, MA
Liam Dennison	Defenseman	Canada	20	Manotick, ON
Hugo Esselin	Forward	Sweden	19	Stockholm, SWE
Filip Forsmark	Forward	Sweden	21	Skövde, SWE
Patrick Holway	Defenseman	United States	22	Cohasset, MA; transfer from Maine, red shirt
Jere Huhtamaa	Goaltender	Finland	19	Helsinki, FIN
Regan Kimens	Forward	Canada	20	Concord, ON
Troy Kobryn	Goaltender	United States	20	Hillsborough, NJ
Jacob Modry	Defenseman	United States	20	El Segundo, CA
Ryan Nolan	Forward	United States	21	Winnetka, IL
Zach Uens	Defenseman	Canada	18	Belleville, ON
Zach Vinnell	Defenseman	Canada	21	Cochrane, AB
Liam Walsh	Forward	United States	20	Bridgeville, PA
Mac Welsher	Forward	United States	20	Grosse Pointe Farms, MI

== Roster ==
As of January 1, 2020.

No.	Nat.	Player	Class	Pos	Height	Weight	DoB	Hometown	Previous team	NHL rights
1	(Finland)	Jere Huhtamaa	Freshman	G	6' 2" (1.88 m)	190 lb (86 kg)	2000-04-10	Helsinki, Finland	Jokerit U20 (Nuorten SM-liiga)	—
2	(United States)	Patrick Holway	Junior	D	6' 5" (1.96 m)	220 lb (100 kg)	1996-10-01	Cohasset, Massachusetts	Maine Black Bears (HEA)	DET, 170th overall 2015
3	(United States)	Declan Carlile	Freshman	D	6' 2" (1.88 m)	180 lb (82 kg)	2000-05-18	Hartland, Michigan	Muskegon Lumberjacks (USHL)	—
4	(United States)	Tyler Drevitch (C)	Senior	F	6' 0" (1.83 m)	180 lb (82 kg)	1995-08-01	Middleborough, Massachusetts	Lone Star Brahmas (NAHL)	—
5	(United States)	Jacob Modry	Freshman	D	6' 5" (1.96 m)	210 lb (95 kg)	1999-01-23	El Segundo, California	Wenatchee Wild (BCHL)	—
6	(Canada)	Zach Vinnell	Freshman	D	6' 1" (1.85 m)	185 lb (84 kg)	1998-04-03	Cochrane, Alberta	Camrose Kodiaks (AJHL)	—
7	(Canada)	Zach Uens	Freshman	D	6' 1" (1.85 m)	175 lb (79 kg)	2001-05-13	Belleville, Ontario	Wellington Dukes (OJHL)	—
8	(Canada)	Liam Dennison	Freshman	D	5' 9" (1.75 m)	175 lb (79 kg)	1999-02-07	Manotick, Ontario	Youngstown Phantoms (USHL)	—
9	(United States)	Liam Walsh	Freshman	F	6' 0" (1.83 m)	190 lb (86 kg)	1999-07-14	Bridgeville, Pennsylvania	Cedar Rapids RoughRiders (USHL)	—
11	(United States)	Tyler Irvine (C)	Senior	F	5' 11" (1.8 m)	170 lb (77 kg)	1996-05-15	Livonia, Michigan	Muskegon Lumberjacks (USHL)	—
12	(United States)	Jordan Seyfert	Sophomore	F	5' 9" (1.75 m)	170 lb (77 kg)	1999-04-03	Annville, Pennsylvania	Fargo Force (USHL)	—
13	(United States)	Chase Gresock (C)	Sophomore	F	6' 1" (1.85 m)	200 lb (91 kg)	1998-08-13	Powell, Ohio	Youngstown Phantoms (USHL)	—
14	(United States)	Patrick Kramer	Senior	F	6' 1" (1.85 m)	195 lb (88 kg)	1997-03-06	Bridgewater, Massachusetts	Youngstown Phantoms (USHL)	—
15	(Sweden)	Hugo Esselin	Freshman	F	6' 2" (1.88 m)	185 lb (84 kg)	2000-07-15	Stockholm, Sweden	Djurgårdens IF Hockey J20 (J20 SuperElit)	—
16	(Canada)	Regan Kimens	Freshman	F	6' 1" (1.85 m)	190 lb (86 kg)	1999-03-28	Vaughan, Ontario	Coquitlam Express (BCHL)	—
17	(United States)	Mac Welsher	Freshman	F	5' 8" (1.73 m)	175 lb (79 kg)	1999-04-24	Grosse Pointe Farms, Michigan	Des Moines Buccaneers (USHL)	—
18	(Canada)	Ben Brar	Freshman	F	6' 2" (1.88 m)	190 lb (86 kg)	1998-11-19	Abbotsford, British Columbia	Prince George Spruce Kings (BCHL)	—
19	(United States)	Joey Cassetti	Freshman	F	6' 3" (1.91 m)	205 lb (93 kg)	1999-02-28	Pleasanton, California	Waterloo Black Hawks (USHL)	—
20	(United States)	Griff Jeszka	Senior	F	6' 1" (1.85 m)	195 lb (88 kg)	1995-03-12	Muskego, Wisconsin	Massachusetts Minutemen (HEA)	—
21	(United States)	Christian Simeone	Sophomore	F	6' 1" (1.85 m)	180 lb (82 kg)	1997-02-12	Milton, Massachusetts	Alberni Valley Bulldogs (BCHL)	—
22	(United States)	Logan Drevitch	Sophomore	F	5' 9" (1.75 m)	170 lb (77 kg)	1998-04-14	Middleborough, Massachusetts	Boston Bandits (NCDC)	—
24	(United States)	Ryan Nolan	Freshman	F	6' 1" (1.85 m)	205 lb (93 kg)	1998-07-14	Winnetka, Illinois	Victoria Grizzlies (BCHL)	—
25	(France)	Sami Tavernier (C)	Senior	F	6' 1" (1.85 m)	190 lb (86 kg)	1997-04-25	Morzine, France	Topeka Roadrunners (NAHL)	—
26	(Canada)	Tyler Heidt	Sophomore	D	6' 0" (1.83 m)	190 lb (86 kg)	1998-11-07	Saskatoon, Saskatchewan	Melfort Mustangs (SJHL)	—
27	(United States)	Dominic Dockery	Junior	D	6' 2" (1.88 m)	185 lb (84 kg)	1997-01-02	Lockport, New York	Youngstown Phantoms (USHL)	—
28	(Sweden)	Filip Forsmark	Freshman	F	5' 10" (1.78 m)	170 lb (77 kg)	1998-06-23	Skövde, Sweden	Tri-City Storm (USHL)	—
29	(United States)	James Corcoran	Freshman	G	6' 4" (1.93 m)	195 lb (88 kg)	1998-02-23	Walpole, Massachusetts	The Winchendon School (USHS–MA)	—
30	(United States)	Troy Kobryn	Freshman	G	6' 1" (1.85 m)	195 lb (88 kg)	1999-02-14	Hillsborough, New Jersey	Cedar Rapids RoughRiders (USHL)	—

== Standings ==
2019–20 Hockey East Standings
	Conference record							Overall record					
	GP	W	L	T	PTS	GF	GA	GP	W	L	T	GF	GA
#5 Boston College †	24	17	6	1	35	93	48	34	24	8	2	136	71
#9 Massachusetts	24	14	8	2	30	69	49	34	21	11	2	107	67
#12 Massachusetts–Lowell	24	12	7	5	29	60	60	34	18	10	6	90	79
#15 Maine	24	12	9	3	27	56	56	34	18	11	5	89	75
Connecticut	24	12	10	2	26	71	75	34	15	15	4	102	106
Boston University	24	10	9	5	25	69	64	34	13	13	8	103	98
#19 Northeastern	24	11	12	1	23	66	71	34	18	13	3	98	92
Providence	24	10	11	3	23	70	63	34	16	12	6	102	78
New Hampshire	24	9	12	3	21	54	69	34	15	15	4	91	97
Merrimack	24	7	14	3	17	63	77	34	9	22	3	85	123
Vermont	24	2	18	4	8	44	83	34	5	23	6	59	100
Championship: March 21, 2020 † indicates conference regular season champion * indicates conference tournament champion (Lamoriello Trophy); Rankings: USCHO.com Top 20 Poll

== Schedule and results ==
Date	Time	Opponent^{#}	Rank^{#}	Site	TV	Decision	Result	Attendance	Record
Regular season
October 5	8:07 PM	at Lake Superior State*		Taffy Abel Arena • Sault Ste. Marie, Michigan		Huhtamaa	L 2–6	1,860	0–1–0
October 6	6:07 PM	at Lake Superior State*		Taffy Abel Arena • Sault Ste. Marie, Michigan		Kobryn	L 3–4	1,435	0–2–0
October 12	7:00 PM	vs. #16 Wisconsin*		J. Thom Lawler Rink • North Andover, Massachusetts		Corcoran	L 5–11	2,106	0–3–0
October 17	7:05 PM	at Holy Cross*		Hart Center • Worcester, Massachusetts	NESN+	Kobryn	W 3–1	1,550	1–3–0
October 19	7:00 PM	at RIT*		Blue Cross Arena • Rochester, New York		Kobryn	L 0–4	9,805	1–4–0
October 25	7:00 PM	vs. New Hampshire		J. Thom Lawler Rink • North Andover, Massachusetts		Huhtamaa	L 2–3 ^{OT}	1,866	1–5–0 (0–1–0)
November 1	7:15 PM	vs. Connecticut		J. Thom Lawler Rink • North Andover, Massachusetts		Huhtamaa	L 2–3	1,734	1–6–0 (0–2–0)
November 3	2:05 PM	at Connecticut		XL Center • Hartford, Connecticut		Huhtamaa	W 3–2	3,387	2–6–0 (1–2–0)
November 8	7:05 PM	at #13 Northeastern		J. Thom Lawler Rink • North Andover, Massachusetts		Huhtamaa	T 1–1 ^{OT}	2,014	2–6–1 (1–2–1)
November 9	3:31 PM	at #13 Northeastern		Matthews Arena • Boston, Massachusetts		Huhtamaa	L 1–3	2,175	2–7–1 (1–3–1)
November 22	7:00 PM	at #7 Massachusetts		Mullins Center • Amherst, Massachusetts	NESN	Kobryn	T 2–2 ^{OT}	2,904	2–7–2 (1–3–2)
November 23	7:05 PM	vs. #7 Massachusetts		J. Thom Lawler Rink • North Andover, Massachusetts		Kobryn	L 2–3	2,412	2–8–2 (1–4–2)
November 29	7:05 PM	vs. Penn State*		J. Thom Lawler Rink • North Andover, Massachusetts		Kobryn	L 0–7	1,961	2–9–2 (1–4–2)
November 30	7:05 PM	vs. Rensselaer*		J. Thom Lawler Rink • North Andover, Massachusetts		Huhtamaa	W 5–1	1,301	3–9–2 (1–4–2)
December 7	7:00 PM	vs. New Hampshire		J. Thom Lawler Rink • North Andover, Massachusetts		Huhtamaa	W 4–2	1,748	4–9–2 (2–4–2)
December 8	7:00 PM	at New Hampshire		Whittemore Center • Durham, New Hampshire	NESN	Huhtamaa	L 2–5	4,074	4–10–2 (2–5–2)
December 13	7:00 PM	at Union*		Achilles Rink • Schenectady, New York		Huhtamaa	L 2–3	1,505	4–11–2 (2–5–2)
December 29	4:00 PM	vs. #10 Minnesota–Duluth*		J. Thom Lawler Rink • North Andover, Massachusetts		Kobryn	L 1–4	1,903	4–12–2 (2–5–2)
December 30	4:00 PM	vs. #10 Minnesota–Duluth*		J. Thom Lawler Rink • North Andover, Massachusetts		Huhtamaa	L 1–5	1,707	4–13–2 (2–5–2)
January 4	5:00 PM	vs. #13 Massachusetts–Lowell		J. Thom Lawler Rink • North Andover, Massachusetts		Kobryn	L 1–3	2,142	4–14–2 (2–6–2)
January 7	7:00 PM	at Connecticut		XL Center • Hartford, Connecticut		Kobryn	W 6–2	2,953	5–14–2 (3–6–2)
January 17	7:05 PM	vs. Boston University		J. Thom Lawler Rink • North Andover, Massachusetts		Kobryn	L 2–3	2,503	5–15–2 (3–7–2)
January 18	6:00 PM	at #13 Massachusetts–Lowell		Tsongas Center • Lowell, Massachusetts		Huhtamaa	L 4–6	4,219	5–16–2 (3–8–2)
January 24	7:00 PM	vs. Vermont		J. Thom Lawler Rink • North Andover, Massachusetts	NESN	Huhtamaa	T 5–5 ^{OT}	1,857	5–16–3 (3–8–3)
January 25	7:00 PM	vs. Vermont		J. Thom Lawler Rink • North Andover, Massachusetts		Kobryn	W 4–3 ^{OT}	2,133	6–16–3 (4–8–3)
January 31	7:00 PM	at Maine		Alfond Arena • Orono, Maine	WPME	Kobryn	L 2–6	3,513	6–17–3 (4–9–3)
February 1	7:00 PM	at Maine		Alfond Arena • Orono, Maine		Huhtamaa	L 2–3	4,303	6–18–3 (4–10–3)
February 7	7:30 PM	at Boston University		Agganis Arena • Boston, Massachusetts		Huhtamaa	W 5–1	3,499	7–18–3 (5–10–3)
February 8	7:00 PM	vs. #14 Massachusetts–Lowell		J. Thom Lawler Rink • North Andover, Massachusetts	NESN	Huhtamaa	L 3–4	2,064	7–19–3 (5–11–3)
February 14	7:00 PM	at #7 Boston College		J. Thom Lawler Rink • North Andover, Massachusetts		Huhtamaa	L 2–3	2,011	7–20–3 (5–12–3)
February 15	4:32 PM	at #7 Boston College		Conte Forum • Chestnut Hill, Massachusetts	NESN	Huhtamaa	L 2–6	5,498	7–21–3 (5–13–3)
February 21	7:15 PM	at #15 Providence		Schneider Arena • Providence, Rhode Island		Kobryn	W 2–0	2,905	8–21–3 (6–13–3)
February 22	7:05 PM	vs. #15 Providence		J. Thom Lawler Rink • North Andover, Massachusetts		Kobryn	W 3–2	2,344	9–21–3 (7–13–3)
February 27	7:02 PM	at #4 Boston College		Conte Forum • Chestnut Hill, Massachusetts	NESN	Kobryn	L 1–6	3,124	9–22–3 (7–14–3)
*Non-conference game. ^{#}Rankings from USCHO.com Poll. All times are in Eastern Time.

== Scoring Statistics ==
Name	Position	Games	Goals	Assists	Points	PIM
Tyler Irvine	RW	32	13	14	27	12
Chase Gresock	F	28	11	11	22	10
Declan Carlile	D	34	4	18	22	22
Sami Tavernier	RW	34	6	15	21	43
Logan Drevitch	LW	34	7	11	18	32
Zach Uens	D	34	4	14	18	68
Regan Kimens	LW	33	6	8	14	14
Mac Welsher	C	31	7	5	12	10
Liam Walsh	LW	30	5	5	10	43
Ben Brar	F	32	5	5	10	15
Patrick Holway	D	17	3	7	10	10
Zach Vinnell	D	33	1	7	8	18
Dominic Dockery	D	29	1	6	7	8
Jordan Seyfert	C	16	3	3	6	10
Tyler Drevitch	C	34	2	3	5	16
Liam Dennison	D	31	1	4	5	23
Hugo Esselin	C	31	2	2	4	8
Patrick Kramer	C	9	1	3	4	18
Griff Jeszka	F	25	2	1	3	6
Ryan Nolan	F	18	1	2	3	6
Jacob Modry	D	26	0	3	3	6
Christian Simeone	F	9	0	2	2	9
Joey Cassetti	LW	14	0	2	2	14
Troy Kobryn	G	19	0	1	1	0
Tyler Heidt	D	31	0	1	1	8
James Corcoran	G	1	0	0	0	0
Jere Huhtamaa	G	21	0	0	0	0
Bench	-	34	-	-	-	6
Total						

== Goaltending statistics ==
Name	Games	Minutes	Wins	Losses	Ties	Goals against	Saves	Shut outs	SV %	GAA
Troy Kobryn	19	927	4	9	1	51	424	1	.893	3.30
Jere Huhtamaa	21	1088	5	12	2	63	401	0	.864	3.47
James Corcoran	1	20	0	1	0	6	7	0	.538	17.50
Empty Net	-	22	-	-	-	3	-	-	-	-
Total	34	2058	9	22	3	123	832	1	.871	3.58

== Rankings ==
Poll	Week																							
Poll	Pre	1	2	3	4	5	6	7	8	9	10	11	12	13	14	15	16	17	18	19	20	21	22	23 (Final)
USCHO.com	NR	NR	NR	NR	NR	NR	NR	NR	NR	NR	NR	NR	NR	NR	NR	NR	NR	NR	NR	NR	NR	NR	NR	NR
USA Today	NR	NR	NR	NR	NR	NR	NR	NR	NR	NR	NR	NR	NR	NR	NR	NR	NR	NR	NR	NR	NR	NR	NR	NR

== Players drafted into the NHL ==
=== 2020 NHL entry draft ===
Round	Pick	Player	NHL team
4	105	Zachary Uens	Florida Panthers
4	121	Alex Jefferies†	New York Islanders

† incoming freshman
