= 2019–20 Maine Black Bears men's ice hockey season =

- Conference: 4th Hockey East
- Home ice: Alfond Arena

Rankings
- USCHO.com: 15
- USA Today/ US Hockey Magazine: NR

Record
- Overall: 18-11-5
- Conference: 12-9-3
- Home: 14-1-3
- Road: 5-10-2
- Neutral: 0–0–0

Coaches and captains
- Head coach: Red Gendron
- Assistant coaches: Ben Guité; Alfie Michaud; Scott Hillman
- Captain: Mitchell Fossier
- Alternate captain(s): Jack Quinlivan; Ryan Smith; Tim Dohrety

The 2019–20 Maine Black Bears Men's ice hockey season was the 45th season of play for the program, the 43rd season competing at the Division I level, and the 36th season in the Hockey East conference. The Black Bears represented the University of Maine and played their home games at Alfond Arena, and were coached by Red Gendron, in his 7th season as their head coach.

== Personnel ==
Head Coach: Red Gendron, 7th season
Assistant Coach: Ben Guite, 7th season
Assistant Coach: Alfie Michaud, 4th season
Volunteer Assistant Coach: Scott Hillman

== Roster ==
As of November 12, 2019.

No.	Nat.	Player	Class	Pos	Height	Weight	DoB	Hometown	Previous team	NHL rights
1	(United States)	Jeremy Swayman	Junior	G	6' 3" (1.91 m)	200 lb (91 kg)	1998-11-24	Anchorage, Alaska	Sioux Falls Stampede (USHL)	BOS, 111 overall 2017
2	(Czech Republic)	Jakub Sirota	Sophomore	D	6' 2" (1.88 m)	190 lb (86 kg)	1998-12-20	Kroměříž, Czech Republic	Lone Star Brahmas (NAHL)	—
4	(United States)	Jack Quinlivan (A)	Junior	F	6' 0" (1.83 m)	187 lb (85 kg)	1996-05-20	Shrewsbury, Massachusetts	Boston Junior Bruins (USPHL)	—
5	(United States)	Ryan Smith (A)	Senior	F	6' 0" (1.83 m)	205 lb (93 kg)	1997-04-04	Roanoke, Virginia	Green Bay Gamblers (USHL)	—
7	(United States)	A. J. Drobot	Freshman	F	5' 10" (1.78 m)	175 lb (79 kg)	1998-04-14	Churchville, Pennsylvania	Fargo Force (USHL)	—
10	(United States)	Kevin Hock	Junior	F	5' 11" (1.8 m)	178 lb (81 kg)	1996-11-09	Braintree, Massachusetts	Dexter School (US-Prep)	—
11	(United States)	Mitchell Fossier (C)	Senior	F	5' 11" (1.8 m)	188 lb (85 kg)	1996-12-21	Alpharetta, Georgia	Sioux City Musketeers (USHL)	—
12	(Canada)	Ben Poisson	Freshman	F	6' 1" (1.85 m)	195 lb (88 kg)	1999-08-31	Vancouver, British Columbia	Prince George Spruce Kings (BCHL)	—
13	(United States)	Samuel Rennaker	Junior	F	6' 0" (1.83 m)	200 lb (91 kg)	1995-04-28	Grand Rapids, Michigan	Topeka Roadrunners (NAHL)	—
14	(Denmark)	Jacob Schmidt-Svejstrup	Sophomore	F	6' 2" (1.88 m)	210 lb (95 kg)	1998-01-18	Charlottenlund, Denmark	Fargo Force (USHL)	—
15	(United States)	Brady Gaudette	Freshman	F	5' 10" (1.78 m)	177 lb (80 kg)	1999-03-19	Braintree, Massachusetts	Northeast Generals (NAHL)	—
16	(Canada)	Levi Kleiboer	Freshman	D	5' 11" (1.8 m)	216 lb (98 kg)	1998-07-17	Martensville, Saskatchewan	Minot Minotauros (NAHL)	—
17	(United States)	Tim Doherty (A)	Senior	F	6' 0" (1.83 m)	182 lb (83 kg)	1995-07-10	Portsmouth, Rhode Island	Boston Junior Bruins (USPHL)	—
18	(United States)	J.D Greenway	Junior	D	6' 5" (1.96 m)	212 lb (96 kg)	1998-04-27	Canton, New York	Wisconsin (Big Ten)	TOR, 72 overall 2016
20	(Finland)	Veli-Matti Tiuraniemi	Junior	D	6' 0" (1.83 m)	195 lb (88 kg)	1997-06-17	Jakobstad, Finland	Dubuque Fighting Saints (USHL)	—
21	(Sweden)	Edward Lindelow	Sophomore	F	6' 1" (1.85 m)	205 lb (93 kg)	1997-06-10	Stockholm, Sweden	Minnesota Wilderness (NAHL)	—
22	(Canada)	Dawson Bruneski	Freshman	D/F	5' 11" (1.8 m)	170 lb (77 kg)	1999-06-24	Camrose, Alberta	Drumheller Dragons (AJHL)	—
23	(United States)	Remy Parker	Freshman	F	6' 3" (1.91 m)	170 lb (77 kg)	1998-04-27	Montclair, New Jersey	Jersey Hitmen (NCDC)	—
24	(Canada)	Adam Dawe	Sophomore	F	5' 8" (1.73 m)	161 lb (73 kg)	1999-01-18	Gander, Newfoundland	Sioux Falls Stampede (USHL)	—
25	(United States)	Perry Winfree	Freshman	D	6' 1" (1.85 m)	180 lb (82 kg)	1999-11-24	Cary, North Carolina	Jersey Hitmen (NCDC)	—
26	(United States)	Cameron Spicer	Junior	D	6' 0" (1.83 m)	190 lb (86 kg)	1996-02-22	Erie, Colorado	Islanders Hockey Club (USPHL)	—
27	(United States)	Patrick Shea	Senior	F	5' 11" (1.8 m)	190 lb (86 kg)	1997-03-25	Marshfield, Massachusetts	Kimball Union Academy (US-Prep)	FLA, 192 overall 2015
28	(Slovakia)	Adrián Holešinský	Junior	F	5' 11" (1.8 m)	195 lb (88 kg)	1996-02-11	Cadca, Slovakia	Janesville Jets (NAHL)	—
29	(Canada)	Adrien Bisson	Freshman	D	6' 1" (1.85 m)	180 lb (82 kg)	1999-01-18	Cornwall, Ontario	Ottawa Jr. Senators (CCHL)	—
30	(Sweden)	Emil Westerlund	Junior	F	6' 1" (1.85 m)	200 lb (91 kg)	1998-02-16	Linköping, Sweden	Linköpings J20 (J20 SuperElit)	—
33	(United States)	Stephen Mundinger	Senior	G	6' 8" (2.03 m)	255 lb (116 kg)	1995-04-26	Smithtown, New York	New York Jr. Aviators (NA3HL)	—
34	(Latvia)	Eduards Tralmaks	Junior	F	6' 4" (1.93 m)	210 lb (95 kg)	1997-02-17	Riga, Latvia	Chicago Steel (USHL)	—
35	(Canada)	Matthew Thiessen	Freshman	G	6' 2" (1.88 m)	214 lb (97 kg)	2000-06-09	Altona, Manitoba	Dubuque Fighting Saints (USHL)	VAN, 192 overall 2018

== Standings ==
2019–20 Hockey East Standings
	Conference record							Overall record					
	GP	W	L	T	PTS	GF	GA	GP	W	L	T	GF	GA
#5 Boston College †	24	17	6	1	35	93	48	34	24	8	2	136	71
#9 Massachusetts	24	14	8	2	30	69	49	34	21	11	2	107	67
#12 Massachusetts–Lowell	24	12	7	5	29	60	60	34	18	10	6	90	79
#15 Maine	24	12	9	3	27	56	56	34	18	11	5	89	75
Connecticut	24	12	10	2	26	71	75	34	15	15	4	102	106
Boston University	24	10	9	5	25	69	64	34	13	13	8	103	98
#19 Northeastern	24	11	12	1	23	66	71	34	18	13	3	98	92
Providence	24	10	11	3	23	70	63	34	16	12	6	102	78
New Hampshire	24	9	12	3	21	54	69	34	15	15	4	91	97
Merrimack	24	7	14	3	17	63	77	34	9	22	3	85	123
Vermont	24	2	18	4	8	44	83	34	5	23	6	59	100
Championship: March 21, 2020 † indicates conference regular season champion * indicates conference tournament champion (Lamoriello Trophy); Rankings: USCHO.com Top 20 Poll

== Schedule and results ==
Date	Time	Opponent^{#}	Rank^{#}	Site	TV	Decision	Result	Attendance	Record
Regular season
October 5	4:00 PM	at #7 Providence		Schneider Arena • Providence, Rhode Island		Swayman	L 0-7	3,030	0–1–0 (0–1–0)
October 6	4:00 PM	New Brunswick*		Alfond Arena • Orono, Maine (Exhibition)		Mundinger	L 0-5	2,903	0–1–0 (0–1–0)
October 11	7:00 PM	Alaska-Anchorage*		Alfond Arena • Orono, Maine		Swayman	W 7-1	2,975	1–1–0 (0–1–0)
October 12	7:00 PM	Alaska-Anchorage*		Alfond Arena • Orono, Maine		Swayman	W 2-1 ^{OT}	2,916	2–1–0 (0–1–0)
October 18	7:00 PM	at #8 Quinnipiac*		People's United Center • Hamden, Connecticut	ESPN+	Swayman	W 4-2	3,108	3–1–0 (0–1–0)
October 19	7:00 PM	at #8 Quinnipiac*		People's United Center • Hamden, Connecticut	ESPN+	Swayman	L 3-4	3,119	3–2–0 (0–1–0)
October 25	7:00 PM	at Vermont		Gutterson Fieldhouse • Burlington, Vermont		Swayman	W 2–1	3,329	4–2–0 (1–1–0)
November 1	7:30 PM	Boston University		Alfond Arena • Orono, Maine	ABC Bangor	Swayman	W 4–2	3,447	5–2–0 (2–1–0)
November 2	7:00 PM	Boston University		Alfond Arena • Orono, Maine		Swayman	T 2-2	4,037	5–2–1 (2–1–1)
November 8	7:15 PM	at #14 Mass-Lowell		Tsongas Center • Lowell, Massachusetts	FCS	Swayman	T 1-1	4,199	5–2–2 (2–1–2)
November 9	6:05 PM	at #14 Mass-Lowell		Tsongas Center • Lowell, Massachusetts		Swayman	L 2-3	4,077	5–3–2 (2–2–2)
November 15	7:30 PM	New Hampshire		Alfond Arena • Orono, Maine	FOX Bangor	Swayman	W 3-1	4,787	6–3–2 (3–2–2)
November 16	7:00 PM	New Hampshire		Alfond Arena • Orono, Maine	NESN+	Swayman	W 2-1 ^{OT}	5,012	7–3–2 (4–2–2)
November 22	7:00 PM	at #13 Northeastern		Matthews Arena • Boston, Massachusetts		Swayman	L 2–5	2,021	7–4–2 (4–3–2)
November 23	7:00 PM	at #13 Northeastern		Matthews Arena • Boston, Massachusetts		Swayman	L 2–3	1,929	7–5–2 (4–4–2)
November 29	7:30 PM	at St. Lawrence*		SUNY Canton Ice Rink • Canton, New York	ESPN+	Swayman	W 5-2	515	8-5-2 (4-4-2)
November 30	7:00 PM	at St. Lawrence*		SUNY Canton Ice Rink • Canton, New York	ESPN+	Swayman	T 1-1	363	8-5-3 (4-4-2)
December 6	7:00 PM	at #11 Massachusetts		Mullins Center • Amherst, Massachusetts		Swayman	L 1-5	4,507	8-6-3 (4-5-2)
December 7	7:00 PM	at #11 Massachusetts		Mullins Center • Amherst, Massachusetts		Swayman	L 1-4	3,545	8-7-3 (4-6-2)
December 10	7:00 PM	at Yale*		Ingalls Rink • New Haven, Connecticut	ESPN+	Swayman	L 1-3	1,472	8-8-3 (4-6-2)
December 29	4:00 PM	American International*		Alfond Arena • Orono, Maine	ABC Bangor	Swayman	W 5-1	3,063	9-8-3 (4-6-2)
January 3	6:00 PM	Nebraska-Omaha*		Alfond Arena • Orono, Maine		Swayman	T 2-2	3,123	9-8-4 (4-6-2)
January 4	12:00 PM	vs. Nebraska-Omaha*		Cross Insurance Arena • Portland, Maine		Swayman	W 3-2	3,900	10-8-4 (4-6-2)
January 15	7:05 PM	at Connecticut		Webster Bank Arena • Bridgeport, Connecticut		Swayman	L 2-3	559	10-9-4 (4-7-2)
January 24	7:00 PM	at #4 Boston College		Conte Forum • Chestnut Hill, Massachusetts		Swayman	W 4-3 ^{OT}	5,191	11-9-4 (5-7-2)
January 25	8:00 PM	at #4 Boston College		Conte Forum • Chestnut Hill, Massachusetts		Swayman	W 3-2 ^{OT}	4,758	12-9-4 (6-7-2)
January 31	7:30 PM	Merrimack		Alfond Arena • Orono, Maine	ABC Bangor	Swayman	W 6-2	3,513	13-9-4 (7-7-2)
February 1	7:00 PM	Merrimack		Alfond Arena • Orono, Maine		Swayman	W 3-2	4,303	14-9-4 (8-7-2)
February 7	7:30 PM	#12 Northeastern		Alfond Arena • Orono, Maine	FOX Bangor	Swayman	W 4-2	3,122	15-9-4 (9-7-2)
February 14	7:30 PM	Connecticut	#17	Alfond Arena • Orono, Maine	FOX Bangor	Swayman	L 2-3	4,023	15-10-4 (9-8-2)
February 15	7:30 PM	Connecticut	#17	Alfond Arena • Orono, Maine	NESN	Swayman	W 1-0 ^{OT}	3,876	16-10-4 (10-8-2)
February 21	7:00 PM	Vermont	#17	Alfond Arena • Orono, Maine		Swayman	W 6-1	3,762	17-10-4 (11-8-2)
February 22	4:30 PM	Vermont	#17	Alfond Arena • Orono, Maine	NESN	Swayman	T 0-0	4,917	17-10-5 (11-8-3)
February 29	7:00 PM	at #19 Providence	#15	Schneider Arena • Providence, Rhode Island		Swayman	L 2-3	2,967	17-11-5 (11-9-3)
March 6	7:30 PM	#18 Providence	#15	Alfond Arena • Orono, Maine (Senior Night)	ABC Bangor	Swayman	W 1-0	5,050	18-11-5 (12-9-3)
Hockey East Tournament
March 13	7:00 PM	Connecticut	#15	Alfond Arena • Orono, Maine			cancelled due to the COVID-19 pandemic		
March 14	6:00 PM	Connecticut	#15	Alfond Arena • Orono, Maine			cancelled due to the COVID-19 pandemic		
*Non-conference game. ^{#}Rankings from USCHO.com Poll. All times are in Eastern Time.

== Scoring Statistics ==
Name	Position	Games	Goals	Assists	Points	PIM
Mitchell Fossier	LW	34	10	32	42	12
Tim Doherty	C/LW	34	14	23	37	32
Eduards Tralmaks	C/LW	34	14	16	30	13
Adam Dawe	C/RW	34	9	11	20	41
Jacob Schmidt-Svejstrup	RW	33	9	9	18	39
Patrick Shea	C	29	6	4	10	16
Ryan Smith	F	34	4	6	10	8
Weli-Matti Tiuraniemi	D	34	2	8	10	10
James Greenway	D	34	1	9	10	61
A. J. Drobot	RW	34	4	5	9	14
Jakub Sirota	D	34	1	8	9	26
Samuel Rennaker	C	28	5	3	8	14
Ben Poisson	F	34	3	5	8	14
Adrien Bisson	D	33	2	5	7	29
Emil Westerlund	LW/RW	18	1	6	7	12
Simon Butala	D	34	1	4	5	52
Levi Kleiboer	D	29	0	5	5	10
Kevin Hock	F	11	1	2	3	2
Cameron Spicer	D	30	1	2	3	16
Jack Quinlivan	F	34	1	2	3	16
Matthew Thiessen	G	1	0	0	0	0
Adrian Holesinsky	C	2	0	0	0	2
Dawson Bruneski	D	4	0	0	0	4
Perry Winfree	D	5	0	0	0	0
Brady Gaudette	F	6	0	0	0	0
Edward Lindelöw	C	10	0	0	0	2
Jeremy Swayman	G	34	0	0	0	0
Bench	-	-	-	-	-	8
Total			89	165	254	451

== Goaltending statistics ==
Name	Games	Minutes	Wins	Losses	Ties	Goals against	Saves	Shut outs	SV %	GAA
Jeremy Swayman	34	2060	18	11	5	71	1099	3	.939	2.07
Matthew Thiessen	1	7	0	0	0	3	3	0	.500	25.59
Empty Net	-	14	-	-	-	1	-	-	-	-
Total	34	2081	18	11	5	75	1102	3	.936	2.16

== Rankings ==
Poll	Week																							
Poll	Pre	1	2	3	4	5	6	7	8	9	10	11	12	13	14	15	16	17	18	19	20	21	22	23 (Final)
USCHO.com	NR	NR	NR	NR	NR	NR	NR	NR	NR	NR	NR	NR	NR	NR	NR	NR	NR	NR	17	17	15	15	15	15
USA Today	NR	NR	NR	NR	NR	NR	NR	NR	NR	NR	NR	NR	NR	NR	NR	NR	NR	NR	NR	NR	NR	NR	NR	NR
