= 2019–20 New Hampshire Wildcats men's ice hockey season =

- Conference: 9th Hockey East
- Home ice: Whittemore Center

Rankings
- USCHO.com: NR
- USA Today/ US Hockey Magazine: NR

Record
- Overall: 15–15–4
- Conference: 9–12–3
- Home: 10–5–2
- Road: 4–9–2
- Neutral: 1–1–0

Coaches and captains
- Head coach: Mike Souza
- Assistant coaches: Glenn Stewart; Jeff Giuliano; Ty Conklin
- Captain: Anthony Wyse
- Alternate captain(s): Patrick Grasso; Charlie Kelleher

The 2019-20 New Hampshire Wildcats Men's ice hockey season was the 94th season of play for the program and the 36th season in the Hockey East conference. The Wildcats represented the University of New Hampshire and were coached by Mike Souza, in his second season.

== Roster ==
As of June 28, 2019

| No. | Nat. | Player | Class | Pos | Height | Weight | DoB | Hometown | Previous team | NHL rights |
|---|---|---|---|---|---|---|---|---|---|---|
| 2 | (United States) | Drew Hickey | Sophomore | D | 5' 11" (1.8 m) | 185 lb (84 kg) | 1997-10-28 | New Canaan, Connecticut | Connecticut Jr. Rangers (NCDC) | — |
| 3 | (United States) | Ryan Verrier | Sophomore | D | 6' 0" (1.83 m) | 175 lb (79 kg) | 1998-11-19 | Reading, Massachusetts | Green Bay Gamblers (USHL) | — |
| 5 | (United States) | Will MacKinnon | Sophomore | D | 5' 11" (1.8 m) | 200 lb (91 kg) | 2000-04-13 | Plymouth, Michigan | Des Moines Buccaneers (USHL) | — |
| 6 | (United States) | Lucas Herrmann | Freshman | F | 6' 2" (1.88 m) | 187 lb (85 kg) | 2000-08-01 | Lancaster, New York | Madison Capitols (USHL) | — |
| 7 | (United States) | Nolan McElhaney | Freshman | D | 6' 3" (1.91 m) | 190 lb (86 kg) | 1999-04-22 | Natick, Massachusetts | Omaha Lancers (USPHL) | — |
| 8 | (United States) | Max Gildon | Junior | D | 6' 3" (1.91 m) | 210 lb (95 kg) | 1999-05-17 | Plano, Texas | USNTDP (USHL) | FLA, 66th overall 2017 |
| 9 | (Canada) | Angus Crookshank | Sophomore | F | 5' 11" (1.8 m) | 180 lb (82 kg) | 1999-10-02 | North Vancouver, British Columbia | Langley Rivermen (BCHL) | OTT, 126th overall 2018 |
| 10 | (Sweden) | Kalle Eriksson | Freshman | D | 5' 10" (1.78 m) | 175 lb (79 kg) | 1999-09-15 | Leksand, Sweden | Madison Capitols (USHL) | — |
| 11 | (United States) | Jackson Pierson | Sophomore | F | 5' 9" (1.75 m) | 160 lb (73 kg) | 1999-09-10 | Zionsville, Indiana | Culver Academies (Midget AAA) | — |
| 12 | (United States) | Eric Esposito | Sophomore | F | 5' 11" (1.8 m) | 180 lb (82 kg) | 1998-08-24 | West Haven, Connecticut | Youngstown Phantoms (USHL) | — |
| 13 | (Canada) | Justin Fregona | Senior | F | 5' 7" (1.7 m) | 170 lb (77 kg) | 1997-05-29 | Mississauga, Ontario | Langley Rivermen (BCHL) | — |
| 14 | (United States) | Joe Sacco | Junior | F | 5' 11" (1.8 m) | 190 lb (86 kg) | 1996-06-01 | Reading, Massachusetts | Vernon Vipers (BCHL) | — |
| 15 | (Canada) | Chase Stevenson | Freshman | F | 5' 11" (1.8 m) | 175 lb (79 kg) | 1999-01-13 | West Kelowna, British Columbia | Trail Smoke Eaters (BCHL) | — |
| 16 | (Sweden) | Filip Engarås | Sophomore | F | 6' 0" (1.83 m) | 190 lb (86 kg) | 1999-05-16 | Stockholm, Sweden | Skellefteå AIK (J20 SuperElit) | — |
| 17 | (United States) | Robby Griffin | Freshman | F | 6' 0" (1.83 m) | 185 lb (84 kg) | 2001-01-08 | Burlington, Massachusetts | Boston Junior Bruins (NCDC) | — |
| 18 | (Japan) | Kohei Sato | Junior | F | 6' 1" (1.85 m) | 185 lb (84 kg) | 1996-09-26 | Nishitōkyō, Japan | Northeast Generals (NAHL) | — |
| 19 | (United States) | Eric MacAdams | Junior | F | 5' 11" (1.8 m) | 190 lb (86 kg) | 1997-04-29 | Salem, Massachusetts | Dubuque Fighting Saints (USHL) | — |
| 20 | (United States) | Patrick Grasso (A) | Junior | F | 5' 7" (1.7 m) | 170 lb (77 kg) | 1996-05-29 | Ankeny, Iowa | Des Moines Buccaneers (USHL) | — |
| 21 | (United States) | Anthony Wyse (C) | Senior | D | 6' 3" (1.91 m) | 230 lb (104 kg) | 1996-03-29 | Newton, Massachusetts | Lincoln Stars (USHL) | — |
| 23 | (United States) | Charlie Kelleher (A) | Junior | F | 5' 8" (1.73 m) | 160 lb (73 kg) | 1997-02-04 | Longmeadow, Massachusetts | Sioux City Musketeers (USHL) | — |
| 26 | (Canada) | Liam Blackburn | Senior | F | 5' 10" (1.78 m) | 175 lb (79 kg) | 1996-06-08 | Prince George, British Columbia | West Kelowna Warriors (BCHL) | — |
| 27 | (Canada) | Matt Dawson | Senior | D | 5' 10" (1.78 m) | 170 lb (77 kg) | 1996-08-13 | Delta, British Columbia | Green Bay Gamblers (USHL) | — |
| 28 | (United States) | Benton Maass | Junior | D | 6' 2" (1.88 m) | 205 lb (93 kg) | 1998-11-25 | Elk River, Minnesota | Elk River High School (USHS–MN) | WSH, 182nd overall 2017 |
| 29 | (United States) | Joseph Cipollone | Sophomore | F | 5' 8" (1.73 m) | 175 lb (79 kg) | 1997-03-29 | Purchase, New York | Boston Junior Bruins (NCDC) | — |
| 31 | (United States) | Mike Robinson | Junior | G | 6' 4" (1.93 m) | 195 lb (88 kg) | 1997-03-27 | Bedford, New Hampshire | Springfield Jr. Blues (NAHL) | SJS, 86th overall 2015 |
| 33 | (United States) | Joe Lazzaro | Senior | G | 5' 7" (1.7 m) | 180 lb (82 kg) | 1997-06-13 | Hampstead, New Hampshire | Phillips Exeter Academy (USHS–NH) | — |
| 35 | (Canada) | Ty Taylor | Sophomore | G | 6' 4" (1.93 m) | 200 lb (91 kg) | 1999-07-05 | Richmond, British Columbia | Vernon Vipers (BCHL) | TBL, 214th overall 2018 |

== Standings ==
2019–20 Hockey East Standings
| | Conference record | | | | | | | Overall record | | | | | |
| | GP | W | L | T | PTS | GF | GA | GP | W | L | T | GF | GA |
|---|---|---|---|---|---|---|---|---|---|---|---|---|---|
| #5 Boston College † | 24 | 17 | 6 | 1 | 35 | 93 | 48 | 34 | 24 | 8 | 2 | 136 | 71 |
| #9 Massachusetts | 24 | 14 | 8 | 2 | 30 | 69 | 49 | 34 | 21 | 11 | 2 | 107 | 67 |
| #12 Massachusetts–Lowell | 24 | 12 | 7 | 5 | 29 | 60 | 60 | 34 | 18 | 10 | 6 | 90 | 79 |
| #15 Maine | 24 | 12 | 9 | 3 | 27 | 56 | 56 | 34 | 18 | 11 | 5 | 89 | 75 |
| Connecticut | 24 | 12 | 10 | 2 | 26 | 71 | 75 | 34 | 15 | 15 | 4 | 102 | 106 |
| Boston University | 24 | 10 | 9 | 5 | 25 | 69 | 64 | 34 | 13 | 13 | 8 | 103 | 98 |
| #19 Northeastern | 24 | 11 | 12 | 1 | 23 | 66 | 71 | 34 | 18 | 13 | 3 | 98 | 92 |
| Providence | 24 | 10 | 11 | 3 | 23 | 70 | 63 | 34 | 16 | 12 | 6 | 102 | 78 |
| New Hampshire | 24 | 9 | 12 | 3 | 21 | 54 | 69 | 34 | 15 | 15 | 4 | 91 | 97 |
| Merrimack | 24 | 7 | 14 | 3 | 17 | 63 | 77 | 34 | 9 | 22 | 3 | 85 | 123 |
| Vermont | 24 | 2 | 18 | 4 | 8 | 44 | 83 | 34 | 5 | 23 | 6 | 59 | 100 |
Championship: March 21, 2020 † indicates conference regular season champion * indicates conference tournament champion (Lamoriello Trophy); Rankings: USCHO.com Top 20 Poll

== Schedule and results ==
| Date | Time | Opponent^{#} | Rank^{#} | Site | TV | Decision | Result | Attendance | Record |
Exhibition
| October 6 | 5:00 p.m. | vs. Guelph* | | Whittemore Center • Durham, New Hampshire (Exhibition) | | Taylor | W 4–3 | 2,817 | |
Regular season
| October 11 | 7:05 p.m. | at Miami* | | Steve Cady Arena • Oxford, Ohio | | Robinson | W 6–2 | 1,571 | 1–0–0 |
| October 12 | 7:05 p.m. | at Miami* | | Steve Cady Arena • Oxford, Ohio | | Robinson | T 4–4 ^{OT} | 1,833 | 1–0–1 |
| October 18 | 7:05 p.m. | at Bentley* | | Bentley Arena • Waltham, Massachusetts | | Robinson | L 2–3 ^{OT} | 1,821 | 1–1–1 |
| October 25 | 7:00 p.m. | at Merrimack | | J. Thom Lawler Rink • North Andover, Massachusetts | | Taylor | W 3–2 ^{OT} | 1,866 | 1–1–1 (1–0–0) |
| October 26 | 7:05 p.m. | at Boston University | | Agganis Arena • Boston, Massachusetts | | Robinson | L 0–3 | 2,777 | 2–2–1 (1–1–0) |
| November 1 | 7:05 p.m. | vs. #15 Boston College | | Whittemore Center • Durham, New Hampshire | NESN | Robinson | W 1–0 ^{OT} | 4,832 | 3–2–1 (2–1–0) |
| November 2 | 7:05 p.m. | vs. Dartmouth* | | Whittemore Center • Durham, New Hampshire | | Taylor | W 5–4 ^{OT} | 4,012 | 4–2–1 (2–1–0) |
| November 10 | 1:00 p.m. | vs. #2 Massachusetts | | Whittemore Center • Durham, New Hampshire | NESN | Robinson | W 3–1 | 4,707 | 5–2–1 (3–1–0) |
| November 15 | 7:30 p.m. | at Maine | | Alfond Arena • Orono, Maine | | Robinson | L 1–3 | 4,787 | 5–3–1 (3–2–0) |
| November 16 | 7:00 p.m. | at Maine | | Alfond Arena • Orono, Maine | NESN+ | Robinson | L 1–2 ^{OT} | 5,012 | 5–4–1 (3–3–0) |
| November 22 | 7:00 p.m. | vs. Michigan* | | Whittemore Center • Durham, New Hampshire | | Robinson | L 1–4 | 5,246 | 5–5–1 (3–3–0) |
| November 23 | 7:00 p.m. | vs. Michigan* | | Whittemore Center • Durham, New Hampshire | NESN | Robinson | W 3–2 ^{OT} | 6,038 | 6–5–1 (3–3–0) |
Friendship Four
| November 29 | 10:00 a.m. | vs. #12 Northeastern* | | SSE Arena Belfast • Belfast, Northern Ireland (Friendship Four Semifinal) | NESN | Robinson | L 0–4 | 3,200 | 6–6–1 (3–4–0) |
| November 30 | 10:00 a.m. | vs. Princeton* | | SSE Arena Belfast • Belfast, Northern Ireland (Friendship Four Championship) | NESN+ | Robinson | W 3–2 | 4,163 | 7–6–1 (3–4–0) |
| December 7 | 7:00 p.m. | at Merrimack | | J. Thom Lawler Rink • North Andover, Massachusetts | | Robinson | L 2–4 | 1,748 | 7–7–1 (3–5–0) |
| December 8 | 7:00 p.m. | vs. Merrimack | | Whittemore Center • Durham, New Hampshire | NESN | Taylor | W 5–2 | 4,074 | 8–7–1 (4–5–0) |
| December 29 | 4:05 p.m. | at Army* | | Tate Rink • West Point, New York | | Robinson | L 4–5 | 2,614 | 8–8–1 (4–5–0) |
| January 3 | 7:00 p.m. | vs. Yale* | | Whittemore Center • Durham, New Hampshire | NESN | Taylor | W 4–1 | 3,575 | 9–8–1 (4–5–0) |
| January 4 | 7:05 p.m. | vs. Brown* | | Whittemore Center • Durham, New Hampshire | NESN | Taylor | W 5–1 | 3,241 | 10–8–1 (4–5–0) |
| January 11 | 7:00 p.m. | vs. #11 Northeastern | | Whittemore Center • Durham, New Hampshire | | Taylor | W 5–4 | 5,091 | 11–8–1 (5–5–0) |
| January 17 | 7:00 p.m. | at #11 Providence | | Schneider Arena • Providence, Rhode Island | NESN | Robinson | W 4–3 | 3,030 | 12–8–1 (6–5–0) |
| January 18 | 7:00 p.m. | vs. #11 Providence | | Whittemore Center • Durham, New Hampshire | NESN | Taylor | L 1–5 | 3,991 | 12–9–1 (6–6–0) |
| January 24 | 7:30 p.m. | at #7 Massachusetts | | Mullins Center • Amherst, Massachusetts | | Robinson | W 1–0 | 4,873 | 13–9–1 (7–6–0) |
| January 25 | 7:00 p.m. | vs. #7 Massachusetts | | Whittemore Center • Durham, New Hampshire | NESN+ | Robinson | T 1–1 ^{OT} | 6,093 | 13–9–2 (7–6–1) |
| January 31 | 7:00 p.m. | vs. Connecticut | | Whittemore Center • Durham, New Hampshire | | Robinson | L 4–7 | 4,671 | 13–10–2 (7–7–1) |
| February 1 | 4:00 p.m. | at Connecticut | | XL Center • Hartford, Connecticut | NESN | Taylor | L 4–7 | 8,211 | 13–11–2 (7–8–1) |
| February 7 | 7:00 p.m. | vs. Vermont | | Whittemore Center • Durham, New Hampshire | NESN+ | Robinson | W 6–3 | 3,809 | 14–11–2 (8–8–1) |
| February 8 | 7:05 p.m. | vs. Vermont | | Whittemore Center • Durham, New Hampshire | NESN+ | Robinson | W 2–1 | 4,899 | 15–11–2 (9–8–1) |
| February 14 | 7:05 p.m. | vs. Boston University | | Whittemore Center • Durham, New Hampshire | NESN+ | Robinson | L 1–4 | 4,969 | 15–12–2 (9–9–1) |
| February 15 | 7:05 p.m. | at Boston University | | Agganis Arena • Boston, Massachusetts | | Robinson | L 1–3 | 3,814 | 15–13–2 (9–10–1) |
| February 28 | 7:15 p.m. | at #12 Massachusetts–Lowell | | Tsongas Center • Lowell, Massachusetts | | Robinson | T 2–2 ^{OT} | 5,085 | 15–13–3 (9–10–2) |
| February 29 | 7:00 p.m. | vs. #12 Massachusetts–Lowell | | Whittemore Center • Durham, New Hampshire | | Robinson | L 2–3 | 6,237 | 15–14–3 (9–11–2) |
| March 6 | 7:02 p.m. | at #4 Boston College | | Conte Forum • Chestnut Hill, Massachusetts | | Robinson | L 1–2 | 4,024 | 15–15–3 (9–12–2) |
| March 7 | 7:00 p.m. | vs. #4 Boston College | | Whittemore Center • Durham, New Hampshire | | Robinson | T 3–3 ^{OT} | 6,034 | 15–15–4 (9–12–3) |
*Non-conference game. ^{#}Rankings from USCHO.com Poll. All times are in Eastern Time.

== Scoring statistics ==
| Name | Position | Games | Goals | Assists | Points | PIM |
|---|---|---|---|---|---|---|
| Max Gildon | D | 34 | 7 | 22 | 29 | 40 |
| Patrick Grasso | C | 34 | 13 | 11 | 24 | 8 |
| Charlie Kelleher | RW | 29 | 6 | 17 | 23 | 10 |
| Angus Crookshank | LW | 34 | 16 | 6 | 22 | 39 |
| Jackson Pierson | F | 26 | 2 | 18 | 20 | 6 |
| Eric MacAdams | RW | 33 | 7 | 11 | 18 | 57 |
| Liam Blackburn | F | 34 | 5 | 13 | 18 | 10 |
| Kohei Sato | LW | 32 | 7 | 10 | 17 | 10 |
| Filip Engarås | C | 25 | 8 | 7 | 15 | 6 |
| Chase Stevenson | F | 24 | 4 | 6 | 10 | 10 |
| Eric Esposito | LW | 33 | 4 | 6 | 10 | 12 |
| Benton Maass | D | 34 | 3 | 7 | 10 | 8 |
| Anthony Wyse | D | 33 | 1 | 6 | 7 | 51 |
| Ryan Verrier | D | 34 | 2 | 4 | 6 | 37 |
| Kalle Eriksson | D | 33 | 0 | 6 | 6 | 8 |
| William MacKinnon | D | 34 | 3 | 2 | 5 | 16 |
| Lucas Herrmann | F | 30 | 0 | 3 | 3 | 8 |
| Joseph Cipollone | C | 19 | 1 | 1 | 2 | 6 |
| Justin Fregona | RW | 24 | 1 | 1 | 2 | 6 |
| Joe Sacco | RW | 27 | 1 | 1 | 2 | 4 |
| Joe Hankinson | F | 10 | 0 | 1 | 1 | 2 |
| Robby Griffin | C | 13 | 0 | 1 | 1 | 15 |
| Joe Lazzaro | G | 1 | 0 | 0 | 0 | 0 |
| Drew Hickey | D | 3 | 0 | 0 | 0 | 0 |
| Ty Taylor | G | 8 | 0 | 0 | 0 | 0 |
| Matt Dawson | D | 14 | 0 | 0 | 0 | 4 |
| Mike Robinson | G | 27 | 0 | 0 | 0 | 4 |
| Bench | - | 34 | - | - | - | 6 |
| Total | | | | | | |

== Goaltending statistics ==
| Name | Games | Minutes | Wins | Losses | Ties | Goals against | Saves | Shut-outs | SV % | GAA |
|---|---|---|---|---|---|---|---|---|---|---|
| Joe Lazzaro | 1 | 2 | 0 | 0 | 0 | 0 | 0 | 0 | - | 0.00 |
| Mike Robinson | 27 | 1591 | 9 | 13 | 4 | 68 | 604 | 2 | .899 | 2.56 |
| Ty Taylor | 8 | 23 | 6 | 2 | 0 | 23 | 158 | 0 | .873 | 2.97 |
| Empty Net | - | 16 | - | - | - | 6 | - | - | - | - |
| Total | 34 | 2074 | 15 | 15 | 4 | 97 | 762 | 2 | .887 | 2.81 |

== Rankings ==
| Poll | Week | | | | | | | | | | | | | | | | | | | | | | | |
| Poll | Pre | 1 | 2 | 3 | 4 | 5 | 6 | 7 | 8 | 9 | 10 | 11 | 12 | 13 | 14 | 15 | 16 | 17 | 18 | 19 | 20 | 21 | 22 | 23 (Final) |
|---|---|---|---|---|---|---|---|---|---|---|---|---|---|---|---|---|---|---|---|---|---|---|---|---|
| USCHO.com | NR | NR | NR | NR | NR | NR | NR | NR | NR | NR | NR | NR | NR | NR | NR | NR | NR | NR | NR | NR | NR | NR | NR | NR |
| USA Today | NR | NR | NR | NR | NR | NR | NR | NR | NR | NR | NR | NR | NR | NR | NR | NR | NR | NR | NR | NR | NR | NR | NR | NR |

== Players drafted into the NHL ==
=== 2020 NHL entry draft ===
| Round | Pick | Player | NHL team |
|---|---|---|---|
| 6 | 166 | Luke Reid† | Nashville Predators |
| 6 | 169 | Filip Engarås | Edmonton Oilers |

† incoming freshman
