= 2019–20 Providence Friars men's ice hockey season =

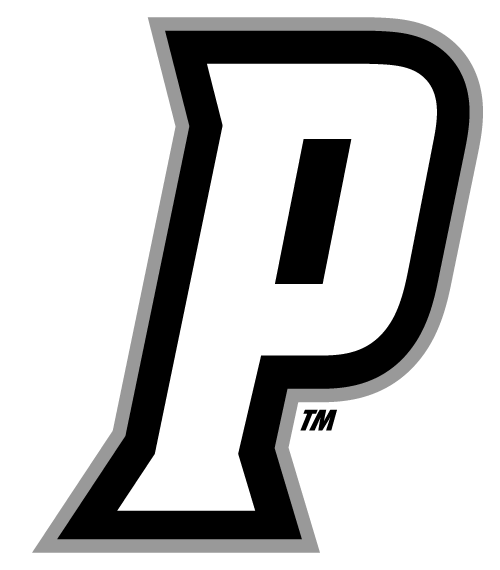

Fortress Invitational, Champion
- Conference: T–7th Hockey East
- Home ice: Schneider Arena

Rankings
- USCHO.com: NR
- USA Today/ US Hockey Magazine: NR

Record
- Overall: 16–12–6
- Conference: 10–11–3
- Home: 7–7–1
- Road: 7–5–3
- Neutral: 2–0–2

Coaches and captains
- Head coach: Nate Leaman
- Assistant coaches: Ron Rolston; Joel Beal; Bruce Irving

The 2019-20 Providence Friars Men's ice hockey season was the 69th season of play for the program and the 36th season in the Hockey East conference. The Friars represented Providence College and were coached by Nate Leaman, in his 9th season.

The Hockey East tournament as well as the NCAA Tournament were cancelled due to the COVID-19 pandemic before any games were played.

== Current roster ==
As of August 1, 2019.

No.	Nat.	Player	Class	Pos	Height	Weight	DoB	Hometown	Previous team	NHL rights
1	(United States)	Jimmy Scannell	Sophomore	G	5' 11" (1.8 m)	165 lb (75 kg)	1999-06-13	Medfield, Massachusetts	Thayer Academy (USHS–MA)	—
2	(United States)	Luke Johnson	Freshman	D	5' 11" (1.8 m)	176 lb (80 kg)	1999-01-07	Edina, Minnesota	Sioux City Musketeers (USHL)	—
3	(United States)	Davis Bunz	Junior	D	6' 1" (1.85 m)	193 lb (88 kg)	1998-09-04	Middleton, Wisconsin	Central Illinois Flying Aces (USHL)	—
5	(United States)	Ben Mirageas	Junior	D	6' 1" (1.85 m)	174 lb (79 kg)	1999-05-08	Newburyport, Massachusetts	Chicago Steel (USHL)	NYI, 77th overall 2017
6	(United States)	Cam McDonald	Freshman	D	5' 9" (1.75 m)	170 lb (77 kg)	2001-02-03	Eagle River, Alaska	Muskegon Lumberjacks (USHL)	—
8	(Sweden)	Albin Nilsson	Freshman	F	6' 0" (1.83 m)	190 lb (86 kg)	1998-09-18	Ljungby, Sweden	Sioux City Musketeers (USHL)	—
9	(United States)	Patrick Moynihan	Freshman	F	5' 11" (1.8 m)	185 lb (84 kg)	2001-01-23	Millis, Massachusetts	USNTDP (USHL)	NJD, 158th overall 2019
10	(United States)	Jerry Harding	Freshman	F	6' 2" (1.88 m)	210 lb (95 kg)	1999-03-22	Canton, Massachusetts	Cedar Rapids RoughRiders (USHL)	—
11	(United States)	Greg Printz	Junior	F	6' 2" (1.88 m)	219 lb (99 kg)	1998-05-04	Fairfax, Virginia	Omaha Lancers (USHL)	—
12	(United States)	Jack Dugan	Sophomore	F	6' 2" (1.88 m)	194 lb (88 kg)	1998-03-24	Rochester, New York	Chicago Steel (USHL)	VGK, 142nd overall 2017
13	(United States)	Craig Needham	Freshman	F	5' 10" (1.78 m)	178 lb (81 kg)	1999-03-31	Medford, Massachusetts	Youngstown Phantoms (USHL)	—
14	(United States)	Matt Koopman	Sophomore	F	5' 10" (1.78 m)	178 lb (81 kg)	1998-05-01	Marblehead, Massachusetts	Waterloo Black Hawks (USHL)	—
16	(United States)	Kyle Koopman	Sophomore	D	5' 11" (1.8 m)	190 lb (86 kg)	1998-05-01	Marblehead, Massachusetts	West Kelowna Warriors (BCHL)	—
17	(United States)	Shane Kavanagh	Senior	F	5' 10" (1.78 m)	193 lb (88 kg)	1995-01-05	East Providence, Rhode Island	Dubuque Fighting Saints (USHL)	—
18	(Canada)	Jamie Engelbert	Freshman	F	6' 4" (1.93 m)	200 lb (91 kg)	2000-06-21	Cobourg, Ontario	Cobourg Cougars (OJHL)	—
19	(United States)	Jason O'Neill	Junior	F	5' 11" (1.8 m)	192 lb (87 kg)	1997-03-23	Odenton, Maryland	Chicago Steel (USHL)	—
20	(United States)	Parker Ford	Freshman	F	5' 9" (1.75 m)	175 lb (79 kg)	2000-07-20	Wakefield, Rhode Island	Sioux City Musketeers (USHL)	—
21	(United States)	Spenser Young	Senior	D	5' 10" (1.78 m)	185 lb (84 kg)	1997-03-24	Brentwood, New Hampshire	Dubuque Fighting Saints (USHL)	—
22	(Canada)	Vimal Sukumaran	Senior	F	5' 11" (1.8 m)	189 lb (86 kg)	1996-04-09	Montreal, Quebec	Chilliwack Chiefs (BCHL)	—
23	(United States)	Michael Callahan	Sophomore	D	6' 2" (1.88 m)	197 lb (89 kg)	1999-09-23	Franklin, Massachusetts	Youngstown Phantoms (USHL)	ARI, 142nd overall 2018
24	(Canada)	Max Crozier	Freshman	D	6' 2" (1.88 m)	190 lb (86 kg)	2000-04-19	Calgary, Alberta	Sioux Falls Stampede (USHL)	TBL, 120th overall 2019
25	(United States)	Luke Perunovich	Sophomore	D	6' 0" (1.83 m)	174 lb (79 kg)	1997-05-12	Edina, Minnesota	Northeast Generals (NAHL)	—
26	(United States)	John McDermott	Junior	F	6' 2" (1.88 m)	201 lb (91 kg)	1997-05-15	Darien, Connecticut	Tri-City Storm (USHL)	—
27	(United States)	Tyce Thompson	Sophomore	F	6' 1" (1.85 m)	171 lb (78 kg)	1999-07-12	Milford, Connecticut	Dubuque Fighting Saints (USHL)	NJD, 96th overall 2019
28	(United States)	Garrett Devine	Freshman	F	6' 1" (1.85 m)	195 lb (88 kg)	1997-11-25	Windsor, Colorado	South Shore Kings (NCDC)	—
29	(United States)	Caleb Rule	Freshman	F	5' 11" (1.8 m)	182 lb (83 kg)	1999-02-15	Lansing, Michigan	Lincoln Stars (USHL)	—
30	(United States)	Jake Kucharski	Freshman	G	6' 4" (1.93 m)	227 lb (103 kg)	1999-09-25	Erie, Pennsylvania	Omaha Lancers (USHL)	CAR, 197th overall 2018
31	(United States)	Michael Lackey	Graduate	G	6' 4" (1.93 m)	214 lb (97 kg)	1997-05-06	Washington, D.C.	Harvard (ECAC)	—
33	(Canada)	Gabe Mollot-Hill	Junior	G	6' 4" (1.93 m)	199 lb (90 kg)	1997-08-12	Ottawa, Ontario	Bloomington Thunder (USHL)	—

== Standings ==
2019–20 Hockey East Standings
	Conference record							Overall record					
	GP	W	L	T	PTS	GF	GA	GP	W	L	T	GF	GA
#5 Boston College †	24	17	6	1	35	93	48	34	24	8	2	136	71
#9 Massachusetts	24	14	8	2	30	69	49	34	21	11	2	107	67
#12 Massachusetts–Lowell	24	12	7	5	29	60	60	34	18	10	6	90	79
#15 Maine	24	12	9	3	27	56	56	34	18	11	5	89	75
Connecticut	24	12	10	2	26	71	75	34	15	15	4	102	106
Boston University	24	10	9	5	25	69	64	34	13	13	8	103	98
#19 Northeastern	24	11	12	1	23	66	71	34	18	13	3	98	92
Providence	24	10	11	3	23	70	63	34	16	12	6	102	78
New Hampshire	24	9	12	3	21	54	69	34	15	15	4	91	97
Merrimack	24	7	14	3	17	63	77	34	9	22	3	85	123
Vermont	24	2	18	4	8	44	83	34	5	23	6	59	100
Championship: March 21, 2020 † indicates conference regular season champion * indicates conference tournament champion (Lamoriello Trophy); Rankings: USCHO.com Top 20 Poll

== Schedule and results ==
Date	Time	Opponent^{#}	Rank^{#}	Site	TV	Decision	Result	Attendance	Record
Regular season
October 5	4:00 PM	vs. Maine	#7	Schneider Arena • Providence, Rhode Island	NESN	Lackey	W 7–0	3,030	1–0–0 (1–0–0)
October 11	7:15 PM	vs. Holy Cross*	#6	Schneider Arena • Providence, Rhode Island		Lackey	L 2–3 ^{OT}	1,900	1–1–0 (1–0–0)
October 12	5:00 PM	vs. US National Junior Team*	#6	Schneider Arena • Providence, Rhode Island (Exhibition)		Kucharski	W 2–1 ^{OT}	2,220	
October 18	7:00 PM	at St. Lawrence*	#13	Roos House • Canton, New York		Lackey	W 6–0	733	2–1–0 (1–0–0)
October 19	7:30 PM	at #10 Clarkson*	#13	Cheel Arena • Potsdam, New York		Lackey	W 4–2	3,186	3–1–0 (1–0–0)
October 25	7:02 PM	at #10 Boston College	#7	Conte Forum • Chestnut Hill, Massachusetts	NESN+	Lackey	W 6–2	6,208	4–1–0 (2–0–0)
October 26	7:00 PM	at Massachusetts–Lowell	#7	Schneider Arena • Providence, Rhode Island	NESN	Lackey	L 2–3 ^{OT}	2,665	4–2–0 (2–1–0)
November 1	7:15 PM	vs. Colgate*	#8	Schneider Arena • Providence, Rhode Island		Lackey	T 3–3 ^{OT}	1,788	4–2–1 (2–1–0)
November 2	7:00 PM	vs. #15 Boston College	#8	Schneider Arena • Providence, Rhode Island		Lackey	L 2–3	2,843	4–3–1 (2–2–0)
November 8	7:37 PM	at Boston University	#11	Agganis Arena • Boston, Massachusetts		Lackey	T 3–3 ^{OT}	2,873	4–3–2 (2–2–1)
November 9	7:00 PM	vs. Boston University	#11	Schneider Arena • Providence, Rhode Island	NESN	Lackey	W 6–5	2,741	5–3–2 (3–2–1)
November 15	7:15 PM	vs. #14 Northeastern	#10	Schneider Arena • Providence, Rhode Island		Lackey	W 3–2	2,576	6–3–2 (4–2–1)
November 16	8:00 PM	at #14 Northeastern	#10	Matthews Arena • Boston, Massachusetts		Lackey	L 3–7	2,032	6–4–2 (4–3–1)
November 22	7:05 PM	at Connecticut	#12	XL Center • Hartford, Connecticut		Lackey	T 3–3 ^{OT}	3,384	6–4–3 (4–3–2)
November 23	7:05 PM	vs. Connecticut	#12	Schneider Arena • Providence, Rhode Island		Lackey	W 5–2	2,183	7–4–3 (5–3–2)
November 30	4:00 PM	vs. Brown*	#13	Schneider Arena • Providence, Rhode Island (Mayor's Cup)		Lackey	W 4–2	2,360	8–4–3 (5–3–2)
December 6	7:15 PM	at #16 Massachusetts–Lowell	#15	Schneider Arena • Providence, Rhode Island		Lackey	L 2–3	1,997	8–5–3 (5–4–2)
December 7	6:00 PM	vs. #16 Massachusetts–Lowell	#15	Tsongas Center • Lowell, Massachusetts		Lackey	W 4–1	4,033	9–5–3 (6–4–2)
Catamount Cup
December 28	4:00 PM	vs. Lake Superior State*	#13	Gutterson Fieldhouse • Burlington, Vermont (Catamount Cup)		Lackey	W 2–1 ^{OT}	3,397	10–5–3 (6–4–2)
December 29	4:00 PM	vs. Union*	#13	Gutterson Fieldhouse • Burlington, Vermont (Catamount Cup)		Lackey	T 1–1 ^{OT}	2,579	10–5–4 (6–4–2)
Fortress Invitational
January 3	8:05 PM	vs. #20 Army*	#14	T-Mobile Arena • Paradise, Nevada (Fortress Invitational Semifinal)		Lackey	W 3–1	3,735	11–5–4 (6–4–2)
January 4	8:30 PM	vs. #2 Cornell*	#14	T-Mobile Arena • Paradise, Nevada (Fortress Invitational Championship)		Lackey	T 2–2 ^{SOW}		11–5–5 (6–4–2)
January 9	7:05 PM	at American International*	#12	MassMutual Center • Springfield, Massachusetts		Lackey	W 5–0	1,102	12–5–5 (6–4–2)
January 11	7:00 PM	vs. Connecticut	#12	Schneider Arena • Providence, Rhode Island		Lackey	W 2–1	2,609	13–5–5 (7–4–2)
January 17	7:15 PM	vs. New Hampshire	#11	Schneider Arena • Providence, Rhode Island	NESN	Lackey	L 3–4	3,030	13–6–5 (7–5–2)
January 18	7:05 PM	at New Hampshire	#11	Whittemore Center • Durham, New Hampshire	NESN	Lackey	W 5–1	3,991	14–6–5 (8–5–2)
January 31	7:00 PM	at #13 Northeastern	#9	Matthews Arena • Boston, Massachusetts		Lackey	L 4–3	2,705	14–7–5 (8–6–2)
February 7	7:00 PM	at #8 Massachusetts	#10	Mullins Center • Amherst, Massachusetts	NESN	Lackey	L 1–3	4,202	14–8–5 (8–7–2)
February 8	7:00 PM	vs. #8 Massachusetts	#10	Schneider Arena • Providence, Rhode Island		Lackey	L 1–5	3,030	14–9–5 (8–8–2)
February 14	7:00 PM	at Vermont	#14	Gutterson Fieldhouse • Burlington, Vermont		Lackey	T 1–1 ^{OT}	2,427	14–9–6 (8–8–3)
February 15	7:05 PM	at Vermont	#14	Gutterson Fieldhouse • Burlington, Vermont		Lackey	W 3–2	2,735	15–9–6 (9–8–3)
February 21	7:00 PM	vs. Merrimack	#15	Schneider Arena • Providence, Rhode Island		Lackey	L 0–2	2,905	15–10–6 (9–9–3)
February 22	7:00 PM	at Merrimack	#15	J. Thom Lawler Rink • North Andover, Massachusetts		Lackey	L 2–3	2,344	15–11–6 (9–10–3)
February 29	4:40 PM	vs. #15 Maine	#19	Schneider Arena • Providence, Rhode Island	NESN	Lackey	W 3–2	2,967	16–11–6 (10–10–3)
March 6	7:38 PM	at #15 Maine	#18	Alfond Arena • Orono, Maine	WPME	Lackey	L 0–1	5,050	16–12–6 (10–11–3)
Hockey East Tournament
Tournament Cancelled
*Non-conference game. ^{#}Rankings from USCHO.com Poll. All times are in Eastern Time.

== Scoring Statistics ==
Name	Position	Games	Goals	Assists	Points	PIM
Jack Dugan	LW	34	10	42	52	64
Tyce Thompson	C	34	19	25	44	29
Michael Callahan	D	34	5	23	28	20
Greg Printz	LW	34	15	12	27	21
Parker Ford	C	31	9	13	22	22
Patrick Moynihan	C	34	13	8	21	8
Max Crozier	D	33	4	12	16	24
Jason O'Neill	F	23	5	8	13	18
Matt Koopman	C	34	5	5	10	12
Vimal Sukumaran	RW	33	4	2	6	32
Luke Johnson	D	33	3	3	6	2
Cam McDonald	D	34	3	3	6	18
Shane Kavanagh	F	34	2	4	6	12
Albin Nilsson	C	22	0	5	5	8
Craig Needham	C	34	1	3	4	2
Jamie Engelbert	C	19	2	1	3	29
Spencer Young	D	32	2	1	3	26
Ben Mirageas	D	26	0	3	3	14
Davis Bunz	D	17	0	1	1	6
Luke Perunovich	D	17	0	1	1	4
Michael Lackey	LW	34	0	1	1	0
Gabe Mollot-Hill	G	2	0	0	0	0
Garrett Devine	F	4	0	0	0	8
Caleb Rule	F	9	0	0	0	4
Jerry Harding	F	14	0	0	0	6
John McDermott	LW	27	0	0	0	12
Bench	-	-	-	-	-	10
Total			102	176	278	411

== Goaltending statistics ==
Name	Games	Minutes	Wins	Losses	Ties	Goals against	Saves	Shut outs	SV %	GAA
Gabe Mollot-Hill	2	37	0	0	0	1	7	0	.875	1.63
Michael Lackey	34	2032	16	12	6	74	874	2	.922	2.18
Empty Net	-	12	-	-	-	3	-	-	-	-
Total	34	2082	16	12	6	78	881	2	.919	2.25

== Rankings ==
Poll	Week																							
Poll	Pre	1	2	3	4	5	6	7	8	9	10	11	12	13	14	15	16	17	18	19	20	21	22	23 (Final)
USCHO.com	7	6	13	7	8	11	10	12	13	15	13	13	14	12	11	10	9	10	14	15	19	18	NR	NR
USA Today	6	7	12	7	7	11	10	13	14	NR	NR	15	14	12	11	10	8	10	14	NR	NR	NR	NR	NR

== Players drafted into the NHL ==
=== 2020 NHL entry draft ===
Round	Pick	Player	NHL team
5	134	Brett Berard†	New York Rangers
6	170	Chase Yoder†	Pittsburgh Penguins
6	182	Riley Duran†	Boston Bruins

† incoming freshman
