= 2019–20 Vermont Catamounts men's ice hockey season =

Catamount Cup, Champion
- Conference: 11th Hockey East
- Home ice: Gutterson Fieldhouse

Rankings
- USCHO.com: NR
- USA Today/ US Hockey Magazine: NR

Record
- Overall: 5–23–6
- Conference: 2–18–4
- Home: 4–10–2
- Road: 1–13–4
- Neutral: 0–0–0

Coaches and captains
- Head coach: Kevin Sneddon
- Assistant coaches: Kevin Patrick; Jeff Hill; Derek Lodermeier
- Captain(s): Matt O'Donnell; Matt Alvaro; Stefanos Lekkas; Max Kaufman

The 2019–20 Vermont Catamounts men's ice hockey season was the 64th season of play for the program, the 47th at the Division I level, and the 15th season in the Hockey East conference. The Catamounts represented the University of Vermont and were coached by Kevin Sneddon, in his 17th season.

In early February 2020, Kevin Sneddon announced that he would retire at the end of the season.

== Roster ==
As of September 7, 2019.

No.	Nat.	Player	Class	Pos	Height	Weight	DoB	Hometown	Previous team	NHL rights
1	(United States)	Tyler Harmon	Junior	G	6' 2" (1.88 m)	205 lb (93 kg)	1997-10-17	Ramsey, New Jersey	Jersey Hitmen (USPHL)	—
2	(United States)	Carter Long	Sophomore	D	6' 3" (1.91 m)	225 lb (102 kg)	1998-02-13	Yorktown, Virginia	Lincoln Stars (USHL)	—
3	(United States)	Andrew Petrillo	Sophomore	D	5' 10" (1.78 m)	190 lb (86 kg)	1998-03-12	Pompton Plains, New Jersey	Central Illinois Flying Aces (USHL)	—
4	(Canada)	Owen Grant	Junior	D	5' 11" (1.8 m)	185 lb (84 kg)	1998-01-22	Ottawa, Ontario	Carleton Place Canadians (CCHL)	—
5	(United States)	Christian Evers	Junior	D	6' 2" (1.88 m)	200 lb (91 kg)	1997-05-25	Waukee, Iowa	Lincoln Stars (USHL)	—
6	(United States)	Andrew Lucas	Freshman	D	5' 11" (1.8 m)	160 lb (73 kg)	1999-02-05	Alexandria, Virginia	Brooks Bandits (AJHL)	—
7	(Canada)	Simon Boyko	Freshman	F	5' 10" (1.78 m)	175 lb (79 kg)	1999-04-04	Mississauga, Ontario	Brooks Bandits (AJHL)	—
9	(Canada)	Bryce Misley	Junior	F	6' 2" (1.88 m)	192 lb (87 kg)	1999-09-05	Toronto, Ontario	Oakville Blades (OJHL)	MIN, 116th overall 2017
10	(Russia)	Vlad Dzhioshvili	Junior	F	6' 0" (1.83 m)	205 lb (93 kg)	1998-01-06	Moscow, Russia	Bloomington Thunder (USHL)	—
12	(Canada)	Nic Hamre	Sophomore	F	5' 9" (1.75 m)	174 lb (79 kg)	1997-04-25	Cumberland, Ontario	Brooks Bandits (AJHL)	—
13	(United States)	Joey Cipollone	Sophomore	F	5' 11" (1.8 m)	184 lb (83 kg)	1999-07-12	Purchase, New York	Tri-City Storm (USHL)	—
14	(United States)	Ace Cowans	Junior	F	5' 7" (1.7 m)	155 lb (70 kg)	1996-09-18	Beverly, Massachusetts	Waterloo Black Hawks (USHL)	—
15	(United States)	Corey Moriarty	Senior	D	5' 10" (1.78 m)	172 lb (78 kg)	1995-07-17	Estero, Florida	Boston Junior Bruins (USPHL)	—
16	(United States)	Derek Lodermeier (C)	Senior	F	6' 2" (1.88 m)	225 lb (102 kg)	1995-01-06	Brooklyn Center, Minnesota	Brooks Bandits (AJHL)	—
17	(United States)	Jacques Bouquot	Freshman	F	6' 0" (1.83 m)	160 lb (73 kg)	2000-02-10	South Windsor, Connecticut	Chilliwack Chiefs (BCHL)	—
18	(United States)	Matt O'Donnell (A)	Senior	D	5' 10" (1.78 m)	181 lb (82 kg)	1995-02-18	Fountain Valley, California	Jersey Hitmen (USPHL)	—
19	(United States)	Johnny DeRoche	Sophomore	F	5' 11" (1.8 m)	182 lb (83 kg)	1998-06-23	Lynnfield, Massachusetts	Connecticut Jr. Rangers (NCDC)	—
21	(Canada)	Riley McCutcheon	Freshman	F	6' 2" (1.88 m)	190 lb (86 kg)	2000-06-25	Courtice, Ontario	Cobourg Cougars (OJHL)	—
22	(United States)	Alex Esposito	Junior	F	6' 0" (1.83 m)	175 lb (79 kg)	1996-06-03	West Haven, Connecticut	Youngstown Phantoms (USHL)	—
23	(United States)	Max Kaufman	Junior	F	5' 8" (1.73 m)	171 lb (78 kg)	1996-06-26	Rochester, New York	Langley Rivermen (BCHL)	—
24	(United States)	Brian Kelly	Junior	D	6' 0" (1.83 m)	178 lb (81 kg)	1997-12-24	Purchase, New York	Connecticut Jr. Rangers (USPHL)	—
25	(Canada)	Matt Alvaro (A)	Senior	F	5' 9" (1.75 m)	180 lb (82 kg)	1996-07-07	Toronto, Ontario	Youngstown Phantoms (USHL)	—
26	(Canada)	Thomas Beretta	Senior	F	6' 1" (1.85 m)	210 lb (95 kg)	1995-04-08	King City, Ontario	Michigan Tech (WCHA)	—
27	(Canada)	Cory Thomas	Junior	D	6' 4" (1.93 m)	205 lb (93 kg)	1998-03-19	St. Brieux, Saskatchewan	Flin Flon Bombers (SJHL)	—
28	(Canada)	William Lemay	Freshman	F	5' 10" (1.78 m)	185 lb (84 kg)	1998-12-28	Marieville, Quebec	Brooks Bandits (AJHL)	—
29	(Canada)	Dallas Comeau	Sophomore	F	5' 11" (1.8 m)	180 lb (82 kg)	1997-09-19	Calgary, Alberta	Grande Prairie Storm (AJHL)	—
30	(United States)	Matt Beck	Junior	G	5' 11" (1.8 m)	175 lb (79 kg)	1996-10-05	Westport, Connecticut	Philadelphia Jr. Flyers (USPHL)	—
40	(United States)	Stefanos Lekkas (A)	Senior	G	6' 0" (1.83 m)	180 lb (82 kg)	1996-01-17	Elburn, Illinois	Sioux Falls Stampede (USHL)	—

== Standings ==
2019–20 Hockey East Standings
	Conference record							Overall record					
	GP	W	L	T	PTS	GF	GA	GP	W	L	T	GF	GA
#5 Boston College †	24	17	6	1	35	93	48	34	24	8	2	136	71
#9 Massachusetts	24	14	8	2	30	69	49	34	21	11	2	107	67
#12 Massachusetts–Lowell	24	12	7	5	29	60	60	34	18	10	6	90	79
#15 Maine	24	12	9	3	27	56	56	34	18	11	5	89	75
Connecticut	24	12	10	2	26	71	75	34	15	15	4	102	106
Boston University	24	10	9	5	25	69	64	34	13	13	8	103	98
#19 Northeastern	24	11	12	1	23	66	71	34	18	13	3	98	92
Providence	24	10	11	3	23	70	63	34	16	12	6	102	78
New Hampshire	24	9	12	3	21	54	69	34	15	15	4	91	97
Merrimack	24	7	14	3	17	63	77	34	9	22	3	85	123
Vermont	24	2	18	4	8	44	83	34	5	23	6	59	100
Championship: March 21, 2020 † indicates conference regular season champion * indicates conference tournament champion (Lamoriello Trophy); Rankings: USCHO.com Top 20 Poll

== Schedule and results ==
Date	Time	Opponent^{#}	Rank^{#}	Site	TV	Decision	Result	Attendance	Record
Exhibition
October 5	7:05 PM	vs. Guelph*		Gutterson Fieldhouse • Burlington, Vermont		Lekkas	W 6–1	3,656	
Regular season
October 18	7:00 PM	at #10 Clarkson*		Cheel Arena • Potsdam, New York		Lekkas	L 2–3	3,098	0–1–0
October 19	7:00 PM	at St. Lawrence*		Roos House • Canton, New York		Lekkas	W 2–0	572	1–1–0
October 25	7:05 PM	vs. Maine		Gutterson Fieldhouse • Burlington, Vermont		Lekkas	L 1–2	3,329	1–2–0 (0–1–0)
October 27	2:05 PM	at #9 Quinnipiac*		People's United Center • Hamden, Connecticut		Lekkas	L 0–4	2,725	1–3–0 (0–1–0)
November 1	7:05 PM	vs. #17 Massachusetts–Lowell		Gutterson Fieldhouse • Burlington, Vermont		Lekkas	L 1–2	3,224	1–4–0 (0–2–0)
November 2	7:00 PM	vs. #17 Massachusetts–Lowell		Gutterson Fieldhouse • Burlington, Vermont		Lekkas	L 3–5	2,784	1–5–0 (0–3–0)
November 15	7:05 PM	vs. #16 Boston College		Gutterson Fieldhouse • Burlington, Vermont		Lekkas	L 1–5	3,118	1–6–0 (0–4–0)
November 16	7:05 PM	vs. #16 Boston College		Gutterson Fieldhouse • Burlington, Vermont		Lekkas	L 0–3	3,585	1–7–0 (0–5–0)
November 22	7:35 PM	at Boston University		Agganis Arena • Boston, Massachusetts		Lekkas	L 0–3	2,331	1–8–0 (0–6–0)
November 23	4:01 PM	at Boston University		Agganis Arena • Boston, Massachusetts	NESN	Lekkas	T 3–3 ^{OT}	3,168	1–8–1 (0–6–1)
November 29	9:05 PM	at Arizona State*		Oceanside Ice Arena • Tempe, Arizona		Lekkas	L 1–2	845	1–9–1 (0–6–1)
November 30	9:05 PM	at Arizona State*		Oceanside Ice Arena • Tempe, Arizona		Lekkas	T 2–2 ^{OT}	800	1–9–2 (0–6–1)
December 6	7:05 PM	at Connecticut		XL Center • Hartford, Connecticut		Lekkas	L 2–3	2,012	1–10–2 (0–7–1)
December 7	3:35 PM	at Connecticut		XL Center • Hartford, Connecticut		Lekkas	L 4–7	2,884	1–11–2 (0–8–1)
Catamount Cup
December 28	7:20 PM	vs. Union*		Gutterson Fieldhouse • Burlington, Vermont (Catamount Cup)		Lekkas	W 2–0	3,397	2–11–2 (0–8–1)
December 29	7:30 PM	vs. Lake Superior State*		Gutterson Fieldhouse • Burlington, Vermont (Catamount Cup)		Lekkas	W 2–0	2,579	3–11–2 (0–8–1)
January 4	4:32 PM	at #5 Boston College		Conte Forum • Chestnut Hill, Massachusetts	NESN	Lekkas	L 3–8	6,572	3–12–2 (0–9–1)
January 7	7:05 PM	vs. Yale*		Gutterson Fieldhouse • Burlington, Vermont		Lekkas	L 2–3 ^{OT}	2,550	3–13–2 (0–9–1)
January 10	7:05 PM	vs. Dartmouth*		Gutterson Fieldhouse • Burlington, Vermont		Lekkas	T 2–2 ^{OT}	3,127	3–13–3 (0–9–1)
January 17	7:00 PM	vs. #10 Massachusetts		Gutterson Fieldhouse • Burlington, Vermont		Lekkas	L 0–4	3,044	3–14–3 (0–10–1)
January 18	7:00 PM	vs. #10 Massachusetts		Gutterson Fieldhouse • Burlington, Vermont		Lekkas	L 1–3	3,015	3–15–3 (0–11–1)
January 24	7:00 PM	at Merrimack		J. Thom Lawler Rink • North Andover, Massachusetts	NESN	Lekkas	T 5–5 ^{OT}	1,857	3–15–4 (0–11–2)
January 25	7:00 PM	at Merrimack		J. Thom Lawler Rink • North Andover, Massachusetts		Lekkas	L 3–4 ^{OT}	2,133	3–16–4 (0–12–2)
January 31	7:00 PM	vs. Boston University		Gutterson Fieldhouse • Burlington, Vermont		Lekkas	L 2–4	3,305	3–17–4 (0–13–2)
February 1	7:00 PM	at Rensselaer*		Houston Field House • Troy, New York		Harmon	L 0–1	3,806	3–18–4 (0–13–2)
February 7	7:30 PM	at New Hampshire		Whittemore Center • Durham, New Hampshire	NESN+	Lekkas	L 3–6	3,809	3–19–4 (0–14–2)
February 8	7:00 PM	vs. New Hampshire		Whittemore Center • Durham, New Hampshire	NESN+	Lekkas	L 1–2	4,899	3–20–4 (0–15–2)
February 14	7:05 PM	vs. #14 Providence		Gutterson Fieldhouse • Burlington, Vermont		Lekkas	T 1–1 ^{OT}	2,427	3–20–5 (0–15–3)
February 15	7:05 PM	vs. #14 Providence		Gutterson Fieldhouse • Burlington, Vermont	NESN	Lekkas	L 2–3	2,735	3–21–5 (0–16–3)
February 21	7:00 PM	at #17 Maine		Alfond Arena • Orono, Maine		Lekkas	L 1–6	3,762	3–22–5 (0–17–3)
February 22	4:30 PM	vs. #17 Maine		Alfond Arena • Orono, Maine	NESN	Lekkas	T 0–0 ^{OT}	4,917	3–22–6 (0–17–4)
February 28	7:05 PM	vs. #13 Northeastern		Gutterson Fieldhouse • Burlington, Vermont		Lekkas	W 4–2	3,328	4–22–6 (1–17–4)
February 29	7:05 PM	vs. #13 Northeastern		Gutterson Fieldhouse • Burlington, Vermont		Lekkas	W 3–1	2,966	5–22–6 (2–17–4)
March 5	7:00 PM	at #9 Massachusetts		Mullins Center • Amherst, Massachusetts		Lekkas	L 0–1	3,046	5–23–6 (2–18–4)
*Non-conference game. ^{#}Rankings from USCHO.com Poll. All times are in Eastern Time.

== Scoring statistics ==
Name	Position	Games	Goals	Assists	Points	PIM
Andrew Lucas	D/F	34	5	10	15	24
Jacques Bouquot	C	33	3	11	14	12
Ace Cowans	C/LW	34	7	6	13	26
Alex Esposito	RW	34	5	8	13	14
William Lemay	LW	34	3	9	12	22
Christian Evans	D	34	6	5	11	49
Derek Lodermeier	LW	34	6	5	11	16
Matt Alvaro	LW/C	34	2	9	11	33
Bryce Misley	C	34	5	5	10	14
Vlad Dzhioshvili	F	33	4	5	9	69
Johnny DeRoche	F	28	0	7	7	2
Thomas Baretta	C	31	2	4	6	14
Max Kufman	F	34	2	4	6	12
Joey Cipollone	C	13	3	1	4	4
Dallas Comeau	F	23	1	3	4	22
Corey Moriarty	D	22	1	2	3	10
Simon Boyko	RW	23	1	2	3	2
Carter Long	D	33	1	2	3	27
Riley McCutcheon	F	12	1	1	2	6
Matt O'Donnell	D	25	0	2	2	8
Owen Grant	D	30	0	2	2	30
Cory Thomas	D	27	1	0	1	8
Andrew Petrillo	D	10	0	1	1	4
Tyler Harmon	G	2	0	0	0	0
Nic Hamre	LW	6	0	0	0	0
Stefanos Lekkas	G	32	0	0	0	0
Bench	-	34	-	-	-	8
Total						

== Goaltending statistics ==
Name	Games	Minutes	Wins	Losses	Ties	Goals against	Saves	Shut outs	SV %	GAA
Tyler Harmon	2	121	0	2	0	4	60	0	.938	1.98
Stefanos Lekkas	32	1931	5	21	6	89	973	4	.916	2.76
Empty Net	-	23	-	-	-	7	-	-	-	-
Total	34	2076	5	23	6	100	1033	4	.912	2.89

== Rankings ==
Poll	Week																							
Poll	Pre	1	2	3	4	5	6	7	8	9	10	11	12	13	14	15	16	17	18	19	20	21	22	23 (Final)
USCHO.com	NR	NR	NR	NR	NR	NR	NR	NR	NR	NR	NR	NR	NR	NR	NR	NR	NR	NR	NR	NR	NR	NR	NR	NR
USA Today	NR	NR	NR	NR	NR	NR	NR	NR	NR	NR	NR	NR	NR	NR	NR	NR	NR	NR	NR	NR	NR	NR	NR	NR
