= 2020 Hockey East men's ice hockey tournament =

2020 Hockey East Men's ice hockey tournament
- Dates: March 13–21, 2020
- Teams: 8
- Finals site: TD Garden; Boston, Massachusetts
- Hockey East Men's Ice Hockey Tournaments

The 2020 Hockey East Men's Ice Hockey Tournament was intended to be played between March 13 and March 21, 2020, at campus locations and at the TD Garden in Boston, Massachusetts. The tournament would have been the 36th in league history. On March 12, 2020, the tournament was canceled due to the coronavirus pandemic, before any games were played.

== Format ==
Continuing the new format re-introduced in the previous year's tournament, eight of the 11 teams qualified for the 2020 Hockey East tournament. The top four teams in the league standings hosted seeds five through eight on campus in the quarterfinals in the first round of the playoffs, while the remaining teams are eliminated from championship contention.

The four quarterfinal winners are reseeded again as they advance to the TD Garden in Boston for the semifinals and Championship Game.

=== Standings ===
2019–20 Hockey East Standings
	Conference record							Overall record					
	GP	W	L	T	PTS	GF	GA	GP	W	L	T	GF	GA
#5 Boston College †	24	17	6	1	35	93	48	34	24	8	2	136	71
#9 Massachusetts	24	14	8	2	30	69	49	34	21	11	2	107	67
#12 Massachusetts–Lowell	24	12	7	5	29	60	60	34	18	10	6	90	79
#15 Maine	24	12	9	3	27	56	56	34	18	11	5	89	75
Connecticut	24	12	10	2	26	71	75	34	15	15	4	102	106
Boston University	24	10	9	5	25	69	64	34	13	13	8	103	98
#19 Northeastern	24	11	12	1	23	66	71	34	18	13	3	98	92
Providence	24	10	11	3	23	70	63	34	16	12	6	102	78
New Hampshire	24	9	12	3	21	54	69	34	15	15	4	91	97
Merrimack	24	7	14	3	17	63	77	34	9	22	3	85	123
Vermont	24	2	18	4	8	44	83	34	5	23	6	59	100
Championship: March 21, 2020 † indicates conference regular season champion * indicates conference tournament champion (Lamoriello Trophy); Rankings: USCHO.com Top 20 Poll

== Bracket ==
Teams are reseeded for the Semifinals

Quarterfinals; March 13–15
1	Boston College
8	Providence
2	Massachusetts
7	Northeastern
(Pairings are reseeded after the first round)
3	Massachusetts Lowell
6	Boston University
4	Maine
5	Connecticut

Semifinals; March 20

Championship; March 21

Note: * denotes overtime period(s)
