= 2019–20 Boston College Eagles men's ice hockey season =

Hockey East, Regular Season Champions
- Conference: 1st Hockey East
- Home ice: Kelley Rink

Rankings
- USCHO.com: #4 (Final)
- USA Today/ US Hockey Magazine: #4 (Final)

Record
- Overall: 24–8–2
- Conference: 17–6–1
- Home: 10–5–0
- Road: 13–3–1
- Neutral: 1–0–1

Coaches and captains
- Head coach: Jerry York
- Assistant coaches: Mike Ayers; Brendan Buckley; Marty McInnis
- Captain(s): David Cotton; Graham McPhee

The 2019–20 Boston College Eagles men's ice hockey team represented Boston College in the 2019–20 NCAA Division I men's ice hockey season. The team was coached by Jerry York, '67, his twenty-sixth season behind the bench at Boston College. The Eagles played their home games at Kelley Rink on the campus of Boston College, competing in Hockey East.

The Eagles competed in just one mid-season tournament during the 2019–20 season, forgoing the traditional holiday break tournament. The Eagles played in the 68th Annual Beanpot Tournament at the TD Garden in Boston, Massachusetts on February 3 and 10. Boston College faced Boston University in the opening round, where they officially tied 4–4 per NCAA rules, but the Terriers advanced to the championship game by scoring in the second overtime. The Eagles faced the Harvard Crimson in the consolation game, securing third place with a 7–2 victory. They failed to secure a Beanpot title for the fourth consecutive season, while Northeastern won their third consecutive title.

The Eagles finished the season 24–8–2, and 17–6–1 in conference play, to secure 1st place in Hockey East and the regular season title. The Hockey East tournament as well as the NCAA Tournament were unfortunately cancelled due to the COVID-19 pandemic, before any games were played. Therefore, no postseason result occurred for the Eagles.

== Previous season recap ==
The Eagles entered the 2019–20 season following a 2018–19 effort falling well short of expectation. While they did advance to the Hockey East tournament championship game, they ultimately fell to the Northeastern Huskies and failed to secure a bid to the NCAA Tournament for a third straight season. Their regular season record was abysmal by recent standards, going only 14–22–3 and 10–11–3 in conference play, finishing seventh in the conference; their lowest result since 2008–09. Additionally, they failed to secure any mid-season tournament title, their only tournament result being their second place Beanpot finish.

== Departures ==
Nine Eagles departed from the program from the 2018–19 roster:

Graduation:

- Michael Kim, Senior – D
- Casey Fitzgerald, Senior – D
- Christopher Brown, Senior – F
- J.D. Dudek, Senior – F
- Ian Milosz, Senior – G

Signed Professionally:

- Joseph Woll, Junior – G (Toronto Maple Leafs)
- Oliver Wahlstrom, Freshman – F (New York Islanders)

Not Retained:

- Jacob Tortora, Sophomore – F (Signed with the Barrie Colts of the OHL)
- Christopher Grando, Sophomore – F (Transferred to Arizona State)

== Recruiting ==
Boston College added eight freshmen for the 2019–20 season: three forwards, three defensemen, and two goalies.

| Player | Position | Nationality | Notes |
|---|---|---|---|
| Drew Helleson | Defenseman | United States | Farmington, MN; Drafted 47th overall by the Colorado Avalanche in the 2019 Draft. |
| Marshall Warren | Defenseman | United States | Laurel Hollow, NY; Drafted 166th overall by the Minnesota Wild in the 2019 Draft. |
| Mitch Andres | Defenseman | United States | Brainerd, MN; Played for the Chilliwack Chiefs of the BCHL. |
| Matthew Boldy | Forward | United States | Millis, MA; Drafted 12th overall by the Minnesota Wild in the 2019 Draft. |
| Alex Newhook | Forward | Canada | St. John’s, N.L.; Drafted 16th overall by the Colorado Avalanche in the 2019 Draft. |
| Mike Hardman | Forward | United States | Hanover, MA; Played for the West Kelowna Warriors of the BCHL. |
| Spencer Knight | Goalie | United States | Darien, CT; Drafted 13th overall by the Florida Panthers in the 2019 Draft. |
| Jack Moffatt | Goalie | United States | Wellesley, MA; Played for St. Sebastian’s in the New England’s prep school league, the ISL. |

=== Mid-season additions ===
- Adin Farhat, Junior – G (Called up from the club hockey team)
- Casey Carreau, Sophomore – F (Returned to the program after having been not retained following his freshman season in 2017–18. Played 44 combined games for the Des Moines Buccaneers and the Boston Junior Bruins in the USHL and USPHL, respectively.)

== 2019–2020 roster ==
=== 2019–20 Eagles ===
As of March 3, 2020.

| No. | Nat. | Player | Class | Pos | Height | Weight | DoB | Hometown | Previous team | NHL rights |
|---|---|---|---|---|---|---|---|---|---|---|
| 1 | (United States) | Adin Farhat | Junior | G | 5' 11" (1.8 m) | 165 lb (75 kg) | 1998-05-03 | Hollis, New Hampshire | Loomis Chaffee School (USHS–NH) | — |
| 2 | (United States) | Michael Karow | Junior | D | 6' 2" (1.88 m) | 212 lb (96 kg) | 1998-12-18 | Green Bay, Wisconsin | Youngstown Phantoms (USHL) | ARI, 126th overall 2017 |
| 3 | (United States) | Luke McInnis | Senior | D | 5' 10" (1.78 m) | 174 lb (79 kg) | 1998-07-29 | Hingham, Massachusetts | Youngstown Phantoms (USHL) | — |
| 4 | (United States) | Drew Helleson | Freshman | D | 6' 3" (1.91 m) | 193 lb (88 kg) | 2001-03-26 | Farmington, Minnesota | USNTDP (USHL) | COL, 47th overall 2019 |
| 5 | (United States) | Marshall Warren | Freshman | D | 5' 11" (1.8 m) | 167 lb (76 kg) | 2001-04-20 | Laurel Hollow, New York | USNTDP (USHL) | MIN, 166th overall 2019 |
| 6 | (United States) | Ben Finkelstein | Senior | D | 5' 10" (1.78 m) | 185 lb (84 kg) | 1997-10-01 | South Burlington, Vermont | Waterloo Black Hawks (USHL) | FLA, 195th overall 2016 |
| 7 | (United States) | Connor Moore | Senior | D | 5' 11" (1.8 m) | 180 lb (82 kg) | 1997-07-04 | Cumming, Georgia | Youngstown Phantoms (USHL) | — |
| 8 | (Finland) | Jesper Mattila | Senior | D | 5' 11" (1.8 m) | 185 lb (84 kg) | 1997-10-09 | Tampere, Finland | Ilves U20 (Nuorten SM-liiga) | — |
| 9 | (United States) | Logan Hutsko | Junior | F | 5' 10" (1.78 m) | 173 lb (78 kg) | 1999-02-11 | Tampa, Florida | USNTDP (USHL) | FLA, 89th overall 2018 |
| 10 | (United States) | Mitch Andres | Freshman | D | 6' 2" (1.88 m) | 205 lb (93 kg) | 1998-09-02 | Brainerd, Minnesota | Chilliwack Chiefs (BCHL) | — |
| 11 | (Canada) | Jack McBain | Sophomore | F | 6' 4" (1.93 m) | 205 lb (93 kg) | 2000-01-06 | Toronto, Ontario | Toronto Jr. Canadiens (OJHL) | MIN, 63rd overall 2018 |
| 12 | (United States) | Matt Boldy | Freshman | F | 6' 2" (1.88 m) | 192 lb (87 kg) | 2001-04-05 | Millis, Massachusetts | USNTDP (USHL) | MIN, 12th overall 2019 |
| 14 | (United States) | Zach Walker | Senior | F | 6' 1" (1.85 m) | 210 lb (95 kg) | 1998-08-02 | Boise, Idaho | USNTDP (USHL) | — |
| 17 | (United States) | David Cotton (C) | Senior | F | 6' 3" (1.91 m) | 189 lb (86 kg) | 1997-07-09 | Parker, Texas | Waterloo Black Hawks (USHL) | CAR, 169th overall 2015 |
| 18 | (Canada) | Alex Newhook | Freshman | F | 5' 11" (1.8 m) | 190 lb (86 kg) | 2001-01-28 | St. John's, Newfoundland | Victoria Grizzlies (BCHL) | COL, 16th overall 2019 |
| 19 | (United States) | Mike Hardman | Freshman | F | 6' 3" (1.91 m) | 190 lb (86 kg) | 1999-02-05 | Hanover, Massachusetts | West Kelowna (BCHL) | — |
| 20 | (United States) | Mike Merulla | Senior | F | 5' 10" (1.78 m) | 182 lb (83 kg) | 1996-01-26 | Kennett Square, Pennsylvania | Aston Rebels (NAHL) | — |
| 22 | (Finland) | Aapeli Räsänen | Junior | F | 6' 1" (1.85 m) | 212 lb (96 kg) | 1998-06-01 | Tampere, Finland | Sioux City Musketeers (USHL) | EDM, 153rd overall 2016 |
| 23 | (United States) | Casey Carreau | Sophomore | F | 5' 10" (1.78 m) | 180 lb (82 kg) | 1998-03-08 | Acushnet, Massachusetts | Boston Junior Bruins (NCDC) | — |
| 24 | (United States) | Patrick Giles | Sophomore | F | 6' 4" (1.93 m) | 204 lb (93 kg) | 2000-01-03 | Chevy Chase, Maryland | USNTDP (USHL) | — |
| 25 | (United States) | Marc McLaughlin | Sophomore | F | 6' 0" (1.83 m) | 204 lb (93 kg) | 1999-07-26 | North Billerica, Massachusetts | Cedar Rapids RoughRiders (USHL) | — |
| 26 | (Finland) | Julius Mattila | Senior | F | 5' 11" (1.8 m) | 175 lb (79 kg) | 1997-10-09 | Tampere, Finland | Ilves U20 (Nuorten SM-liiga) | — |
| 27 | (United States) | Graham McPhee (A) | Senior | F | 6' 1" (1.85 m) | 178 lb (81 kg) | 1998-07-24 | Las Vegas, Nevada | USNTDP (USHL) | EDM, 149th overall 2016 |
| 28 | (United States) | Ron Greco | Senior | F | 5' 10" (1.78 m) | 174 lb (79 kg) | 1995-03-20 | Philadelphia, Pennsylvania | Philadelphia Jr. Flyers (USPHL) | — |
| 30 | (United States) | Spencer Knight | Freshman | G | 6' 3" (1.91 m) | 192 lb (87 kg) | 2001-04-19 | Darien, Connecticut | USNTDP (USHL) | FLA, 13th overall 2019 |
| 31 | (United States) | Jack Moffatt | Freshman | G | 6' 2" (1.88 m) | 181 lb (82 kg) | 2001-01-08 | Wellesley, Massachusetts | Saint Sebastian's School (USHS–MA) | — |
| 35 | (United States) | Ryan Edquist | Senior | G | 6' 0" (1.83 m) | 179 lb (81 kg) | 1998-01-28 | Lakeville, Minnesota | Madison Capitols (USHL) | — |

=== Coaching staff ===
| Name | Position | Seasons at Boston College | Alma mater |
|---|---|---|---|
| Jerry York | Head Coach | 26 | Boston College (1967) |
| Mike Ayers | Assistant Coach | 7 | University of New Hampshire (2004) |
| Brendan Buckley | Assistant Coach | 2 | Boston College (1999) |
| Marty McInnis | Assistant Coach | 7 | Boston College (1992) |

== Standings ==
2019–20 Hockey East Standings
| | Conference record | | | | | | | Overall record | | | | | |
| | GP | W | L | T | PTS | GF | GA | GP | W | L | T | GF | GA |
|---|---|---|---|---|---|---|---|---|---|---|---|---|---|
| #5 Boston College † | 24 | 17 | 6 | 1 | 35 | 93 | 48 | 34 | 24 | 8 | 2 | 136 | 71 |
| #9 Massachusetts | 24 | 14 | 8 | 2 | 30 | 69 | 49 | 34 | 21 | 11 | 2 | 107 | 67 |
| #12 Massachusetts–Lowell | 24 | 12 | 7 | 5 | 29 | 60 | 60 | 34 | 18 | 10 | 6 | 90 | 79 |
| #15 Maine | 24 | 12 | 9 | 3 | 27 | 56 | 56 | 34 | 18 | 11 | 5 | 89 | 75 |
| Connecticut | 24 | 12 | 10 | 2 | 26 | 71 | 75 | 34 | 15 | 15 | 4 | 102 | 106 |
| Boston University | 24 | 10 | 9 | 5 | 25 | 69 | 64 | 34 | 13 | 13 | 8 | 103 | 98 |
| #19 Northeastern | 24 | 11 | 12 | 1 | 23 | 66 | 71 | 34 | 18 | 13 | 3 | 98 | 92 |
| Providence | 24 | 10 | 11 | 3 | 23 | 70 | 63 | 34 | 16 | 12 | 6 | 102 | 78 |
| New Hampshire | 24 | 9 | 12 | 3 | 21 | 54 | 69 | 34 | 15 | 15 | 4 | 91 | 97 |
| Merrimack | 24 | 7 | 14 | 3 | 17 | 63 | 77 | 34 | 9 | 22 | 3 | 85 | 123 |
| Vermont | 24 | 2 | 18 | 4 | 8 | 44 | 83 | 34 | 5 | 23 | 6 | 59 | 100 |
Championship: March 21, 2020 † indicates conference regular season champion * indicates conference tournament champion (Lamoriello Trophy); Rankings: USCHO.com Top 20 Poll

== Schedule ==
=== Regular season ===
| Date | Time | Opponent^{#} | Rank^{#} | Site | TV | Decision | Result | Attendance | Record |
Exhibition
| October 5 | 2:00 pm | New Brunswick* | #11 | Kelley Rink • Chestnut Hill, Massachusetts | | Knight | W 4–2 | 188 | 0–0–0 (0–0–0) |
Regular season
| October 11 | 7:00 pm | #16 Wisconsin* | #10 | Kelley Rink • Chestnut Hill, Massachusetts | NESN+ | Knight | W 5–3 | 6,172 | 1–0–0 (0–0–0) |
| October 13 | 4:00 pm | at Colgate* | #10 | Class of 1965 Arena • Hamilton, New York | ESPN+ | Knight | W 3–0 | 1,235 | 2–0–0 (0–0–0) |
| October 18 | 9:00 pm | at #1 Denver* | #6 | Magness Arena • Denver, Colorado | | Knight | L 0–3 | 6,038 | 2–1–0 (0–0–0) |
| October 19 | 9:00 pm | at #1 Denver* | #6 | Magness Arena • Denver, Colorado | NESN+ | Knight | L 4–6 | 6,390 | 2–2–0 (0–0–0) |
| October 25 | 7:00 pm | #7 Providence | #10 | Kelley Rink • Chestnut Hill, Massachusetts | NESN+ | Knight | L 2–6 | 6,208 | 2–3–0 (0–1–0) |
| November 1 | 7:00 pm | at New Hampshire | #15 | Whittemore Center • Durham, New Hampshire | NESN | Knight | L 0–1 ^{OT} | 4,832 | 2–4–0 (0–2–0) |
| November 2 | 7:00 pm | at #8 Providence | #15 | Schneider Arena • Providence, Rhode Island | | Knight | W 3–2 | 2,843 | 3–4–0 (1–2–0) |
| November 8 | 7:00 pm | Connecticut | #19 | Kelley Rink • Chestnut Hill, Massachusetts | | Knight | W 6–0 | 5,291 | 4–4–0 (2–2–0) |
| November 9 | 3:30 pm | at Connecticut | #19 | XL Center • Hartford, Connecticut | NESN | Knight | W 5–1 | 5,112 | 5–4–0 (3–2–0) |
| November 15 | 7:00 pm | at Vermont | #16 | Gutterson Fieldhouse • Burlington, Vermont | | Knight | W 5–1 | 3,118 | 6–4–0 (4–2–0) |
| November 16 | 7:00 pm | at Vermont | #16 | Gutterson Fieldhouse • Burlington, Vermont | | Knight | W 3–0 | 3,585 | 7–4–0 (5–2–0) |
| November 26 | 7:00 pm | Yale* | #14 | Kelley Rink • Chestnut Hill, Massachusetts | | Knight | W 6–2 | 3,669 | 8–4–0 (5–2–0) |
| November 29 | 4:30 pm | at #9 Harvard* | #14 | Bright-Landry Hockey Center • Boston, Massachusetts | NESN | Knight | W 4–2 | 3,095 | 9–4–0 (5–2–0) |
| December 6 | 7:00 pm | #9 Notre Dame* | #10 | Kelley Rink • Chestnut Hill, Massachusetts (Holy War on Ice) | | Knight | W 4–0 | 7,295 | 10–4–0 (5–2–0) |
| December 8 | 5:00 pm | at #9 Notre Dame* | #10 | Compton Family Ice Arena • South Bend, Indiana (Holy War on Ice) | | Knight | W 6–1 | 3,985 | 11–4–0 (5–2–0) |
| January 4 | 4:30 pm | Vermont | #5 | Kelley Rink • Chestnut Hill, Massachusetts | NESN | Edquist | W 8–3 | 6,572 | 12–4–0 (6–2–0) |
| January 10 | 7:00 pm | #10 Massachusetts | #4 | Kelley Rink • Chestnut Hill, Massachusetts | NESN | Knight | L 1–3 | 6,705 | 12–5–0 (6–3–0) |
| January 11 | 7:00 pm | at #10 Massachusetts | #4 | Mullins Center • Amherst, Massachusetts | NESN+ | Knight | W 6–3 | 5,153 | 13–5–0 (7–3–0) |
| January 17 | 7:00 pm | at #13 UMass Lowell | #5 | Tsongas Center • Lowell, Massachusetts | | Knight | W 3–2 | 4,849 | 14–5–0 (8–3–0) |
| January 18 | 7:00 pm | Boston University | #5 | Kelley Rink • Chestnut Hill, Massachusetts (Green Line Rivalry) | NESN+ | Knight | W 4–3 | 7,884 | 15–5–0 (9–3–0) |
| January 24 | 7:00 pm | Maine | #4 | Kelley Rink • Chestnut Hill, Massachusetts | NESN+ | Knight | L 3–4 ^{OT} | 5,191 | 15–6–0 (9–4–0) |
| January 25 | 8:00 pm | Maine | #4 | Kelley Rink • Chestnut Hill, Massachusetts | | Knight | L 2–3 ^{OT} | 4,758 | 15–7–0 (9–5–0) |
| January 31 | 7:00 pm | at #7 Massachusetts | #5 | Mullins Center • Amherst, Massachusetts | | Knight | W 3–0 | 7,336 | 16–7–0 (10–5–0) |
| February 3^{†} | 8:00 pm | vs. Boston University* | #4 | TD Garden • Boston, Massachusetts (Green Line Rivalry, Beanpot) | NESN | Knight | T 4–4 ^{OT} | 13,141 | 16–7–1 (10–5–0) |
| February 7 | 7:00 pm | #14 UMass Lowell | #4 | Kelley Rink • Chestnut Hill, Massachusetts | | Knight | L 2–3 | 4,298 | 16–8–1 (10–6–0) |
| February 10 | 4:30 pm | vs. #18 Harvard* | #7 | TD Garden • Boston, Massachusetts (Beanpot) | NESN | Knight | W 7–2 | 17,850 | 17–8–1 (10–6–0) |
| February 14 | 7:00 pm | at Merrimack | #7 | Lawler Rink • North Andover, Massachusetts | | Knight | W 3–2 | 2,011 | 18–8–1 (11–6–0) |
| February 15 | 4:30 pm | Merrimack | #7 | Kelley Rink • Chestnut Hill, Massachusetts | NESN | Knight | W 6–2 | 5,498 | 19–8–1 (12–6–0) |
| February 20 | 7:00 pm | at #10 Northeastern | #6 | Matthews Arena • Boston, Massachusetts | NESN | Knight | W 3–2 | 3,054 | 20–8–1 (13–6–0) |
| February 21 | 7:00 pm | #10 Northeastern | #6 | Kelley Rink • Chestnut Hill, Massachusetts | NESN+ | Knight | W 10–1 | 5,910 | 21–8–1 (14–6–0) |
| February 27 | 7:00 pm | Merrimack | #4 | Kelley Rink • Chestnut Hill, Massachusetts | NESN | Knight | W 6–1 | 3,124 | 22–8–1 (15–6–0) |
| February 29 | 7:00 pm | at Boston University | #4 | Agganis Arena • Boston, Massachusetts (Green Line Rivalry) | NESN | Knight | W 4–1 | 5,772 | 23–8–1 (16–6–0) |
| March 6 | 7:00 pm | New Hampshire | #4 | Kelley Rink • Chestnut Hill, Massachusetts | | Knight | W 2–1 | 4,024 | 24–8–1 (17–6–0) |
| March 7 | 7:00 pm | at New Hampshire | #4 | Whittemore Center • Durham, New Hampshire | | Knight | T 3–3 ^{OT} | 6,034 | 24–8–2 (17–6–1) |
Hockey East Tournament (Cancelled)
NCAA Tournament (Cancelled)
*Non-conference game. ^{#}Rankings from USCHO.com Poll. All times are in Eastern Time. Attendance data from Hockey East

† In the opening round of the 2020 Beanpot tournament, Boston University and Boston College officially tied - per NCAA rules - after playing a scoreless 5-minute overtime. The game continued for placement purposes, where the Terriers advanced to the title game by scoring in the second overtime period.

Both the Hockey East and NCAA Tournaments were cancelled as a result of the Coronavirus pandemic, before any games were played. Boston College was scheduled to host Providence in the Quarterfinals of the Hockey East Tournament and was qualified to make the NCAA tournament.

== Rankings ==
| Poll | Week | | | | | | | | | | | | | | | | | | | | | | | |
| Poll | Pre | 1 | 2 | 3 | 4 | 5 | 6 | 7 | 8 | 9 | 10 | 11 | 12 | 13 | 14 | 15 | 16 | 17 | 18 | 19 | 20 | 21 | 22 | Final |
|---|---|---|---|---|---|---|---|---|---|---|---|---|---|---|---|---|---|---|---|---|---|---|---|---|
| USCHO.com | 11 | 10 | 6 | 10 | 15 | 19 | 16 | 14 | 14 | 10 | 5 | 5 | 5 | 4 | 5 | 4 | 5 | 4 | 7 | 6 | 4 | 4 | 5 | 4 |
| USA Today | 7 | 6 | 6 | 10 | 15 | RV | RV | 12 | 12 | 7 | 4 | 4 | 4 | 4 | 5 | 4 | 5 | 4 | 6 | 5 | 4 | 4 | 4 | 4 |

== Statistics ==
=== Skaters ===
2019–20 Statistics
| No. | Player | POS | YR | GP | G | A | Pts | PIM | PP | SHG | GWG | +/- | SOG |
|---|---|---|---|---|---|---|---|---|---|---|---|---|---|
| 1 | Adin Farhat | G | JR | 1 | 0 | 0 | 0 | 0 | 0 | 0 | 0 | E | 0 |
| 2 | Michael Karow | D | JR | 34 | 0 | 4 | 4 | 12 | 0 | 0 | 0 | +10 | 29 |
| 3 | Luke McInnis | D | SR | 34 | 2 | 8 | 10 | 41 | 0 | 0 | 1 | +12 | 35 |
| 4 | Drew Helleson | D | FR | 28 | 1 | 5 | 6 | 12 | 0 | 0 | 0 | +12 | 24 |
| 5 | Marshall Warren | D | FR | 34 | 6 | 5 | 11 | 22 | 0 | 0 | 1 | +22 | 48 |
| 6 | Ben Finkelstein | D | SR | 34 | 5 | 16 | 21 | 18 | 3 | 0 | 2 | +29 | 54 |
| 7 | Connor Moore | D | SR | 33 | 2 | 7 | 9 | 12 | 1 | 0 | 1 | +9 | 36 |
| 8 | Jesper Mattila | D | SR | 34 | 2 | 7 | 9 | 10 | 0 | 0 | 0 | +30 | 31 |
| 9 | Logan Hutsko | F | JR | 30 | 19 | 14 | 33 | 16 | 3 | 0 | 4 | +17 | 111 |
| 10 | Mitch Andres | D | FR | 6 | 0 | 1 | 1 | 2 | 0 | 0 | 0 | +1 | 0 |
| 11 | Jack McBain | F | SO | 34 | 6 | 15 | 21 | 39 | 1 | 2 | 0 | +5 | 45 |
| 12 | Matt Boldy | F | FR | 34 | 9 | 17 | 26 | 8 | 1 | 0 | 1 | +16 | 101 |
| 14 | Zach Walker | F | SR | 28 | 0 | 5 | 5 | 25 | 0 | 0 | 0 | +4 | 21 |
| 17 | David Cotton | F | SR | 32 | 15 | 24 | 39 | 46 | 6 | 0 | 3 | +15 | 118 |
| 18 | Alex Newhook | F | FR | 34 | 19 | 23 | 42 | 8 | 4 | 3 | 4 | +28 | 88 |
| 19 | Mike Hardman | F | FR | 34 | 12 | 13 | 25 | 10 | 0 | 0 | 0 | +21 | 53 |
| 20 | Mike Merulla | F | SR | 7 | 0 | 0 | 0 | 0 | 0 | 0 | 0 | E | 5 |
| 22 | Aapeli Räsänen | F | JR | 34 | 11 | 13 | 24 | 14 | 5 | 1 | 2 | +14 | 51 |
| 23 | Casey Carreau | D | SO | 3 | 0 | 0 | 0 | 2 | 0 | 0 | 0 | E | 3 |
| 24 | Patrick Giles | F | SO | 10 | 3 | 2 | 5 | 4 | 0 | 2 | 0 | +6 | 16 |
| 25 | Marc McLaughlin | F | SO | 34 | 5 | 7 | 12 | 14 | 0 | 2 | 0 | +8 | 40 |
| 26 | Julius Mattila | F | SR | 34 | 10 | 32 | 42 | 10 | 3 | 1 | 4 | +21 | 91 |
| 27 | Graham McPhee | F | SR | 34 | 5 | 7 | 12 | 42 | 0 | 0 | 0 | +4 | 43 |
| 28 | Ron Greco | F | SR | 27 | 4 | 2 | 6 | 23 | 1 | 0 | 1 | +4 | 20 |
| 30 | Spencer Knight | G | FR | 33 | 0 | 0 | 0 | 0 | 0 | 0 | 0 | +59 | 0 |
| 31 | Jack Moffatt | G | FR | 1 | 0 | 0 | 0 | 0 | 0 | 0 | 0 | +1 | 0 |
| 35 | Ryan Edquist | G | SR | 1 | 0 | 0 | 0 | 0 | 0 | 0 | 0 | +4 | 0 |
| | Bench | | | | | | | 10 | | | | | |
| | Team | | | 34 | 136 | 227 | 363 | 400 | 28 | 11 | 24 | +61 | 1063 |

=== Goaltenders ===
2019–20 Statistics
| No. | Player | YR | GS | GP | MIN | W | L | T | GA | GAA | SA | SV | SV% | SO |
|---|---|---|---|---|---|---|---|---|---|---|---|---|---|---|
| 1 | Adin Farhat | JR | 0 | 1 | 2:33 | 0 | 0 | 0 | 0 | 0.00 | 0 | 0 | 1.00 | 0 |
| 30 | Spencer Knight | FR | 33 | 33 | 1979:12 | 23 | 8 | 2 | 65 | 1.97 | 937 | 872 | 0.931 | 5 |
| 31 | Jack Moffatt | FR | 0 | 1 | 9:16 | 0 | 0 | 0 | 0 | 0.00 | 4 | 4 | 1.00 | 0 |
| 35 | Ryan Edquist | SR | 1 | 1 | 60:00 | 1 | 0 | 0 | 3 | 3.00 | 29 | 26 | 0.897 | 0 |
| | Empty Net | | | 15 | 7:52 | | | | 3 | | 3 | | | |
| | Team | | 34 | 34 | 2058:53 | 24 | 8 | 2 | 71 | 2.07 | 973 | 902 | 0.927 | 5 |

== Awards and honors ==
Tim Taylor Award

- Alex Newhook, F – Winner, NCAA Rookie of the Year

Mike Richter Award

- Spencer Knight, G – Top 10 Semifinalist, NCAA Goalie of the Year

USCHO Awards

- Alex Newhook, F – Rookie of the Year

College Hockey News Awards

- Alex Newhook, F – All-Rookie Team, Rookie of the Year
- Spencer Knight, G – All-Rookie Team

Hockey East Awards

- Alex Newhook, F – Rookie of the Year

Hockey East All-Stars

- Alex Newhook, F – All-Rookie Team, All-Second Team
- Matt Boldy, F – All-Rookie Team
- Spencer Knight, G – All-Rookie Team, All-Second Team
- Ben Finklestein, D – All-Second Team
- Jesper Mattila, D – All-Third Team
- David Cotton, F – All-Third Team

National Player of the Month

- Alex Newhook, F – Month of February

National Rookie of the Month

- Spencer Knight, G – Month of November
- Alex Newhook, F – Month of February

Hockey East Player of the Month

- Alex Newhook, F – Month of February

Hockey East Goaltender of the Month

- Spencer Knight, G – Month of December

Hockey East Rookie of the Month

- Spencer Knight, G – Month of November
- Alex Newhook, F – Month of February

Hockey East Player of the Week

- David Cotton, F – Week of October 14, 2019
- Spencer Knight, G – Week of December 9, 2019
- Ron Greco, F – Week of January 6, 2020 (Shared with Tim Doherty, Maine)
- Logan Hutsko, F – Week of January 20, 2020
- Alex Newhook, F – Week of February 17, 2020

Hockey East Defensive Player of the Week

- Spencer Knight, G – Week of February 3, 2020, Week of March 9, 2020

Hockey East Rookie of the Week

- Spencer Knight, G – Week of October 14, 2019, Week of November 18, 2019, Week of March 2, 2020
- Alex Newhook, F – Week of January 13, 2020, Week of February 10, 2020 (Shared with Zac Jones, Massachusetts), Week of February 24, 2020
- Matt Boldy, F – Week of February 17, 2020

== Players drafted into the NHL ==
=== 2020 NHL entry draft ===
| Round | Pick | Player | NHL team |
|---|---|---|---|
| 3 | 89 | Trevor Kuntar† | Boston Bruins |
| 4 | 116 | Eamon Powell† | Tampa Bay Lightning |
| 4 | 118 | Colby Ambrosio† | Colorado Avalanche |

† incoming freshman
