= WPIL =

- Heflin, Alabama; United States
- Frequency: 91.7 MHz

Programming
- Format: Southern Gospel; Classic Country; Bluegrass

Ownership
- Owner: Down the Hill Communications

History
- First air date: 2003

Technical information
- Licensing authority: FCC
- Facility ID: 90951
- Class: A
- ERP: 1,000 watts
- HAAT: 23 meters (75 feet)
- Transmitter coordinates: 33°36′55″N 85°32′41″W

Links
- Public license information: Public file; LMS
- Webcast: Streamon.fm
- Website: wpilfm.com

WPIL (91.7 FM) is a non-commercial radio station licensed to serve Heflin, Alabama, United States. The station is owned by Down the Hill Communications. It airs a mixed Southern Gospel/Classic Country/Bluegrass music format.

== History ==
The station was granted its original construction permit by the Federal Communications Commission on July 5, 2000. The station was assigned the WPIL call letters by the FCC on September 6, 2002. WPIL was granted its license to cover on September 2, 2003.

On August 17, 2007, the station was struck by lightning which vaporized a portion of the broadcast tower leg. This caused the collapse of the tower and destroyed the directional antenna system. WPIL applied to the FCC for special authority to broadcast temporarily from an available tower at the WPIL studio location until a new tower and antenna could be installed. On April 30, 2008, the station resumed normal broadcast operations after completing construction and required repairs and upgrades.

== Translators ==
Call sign	Frequency	City of license	FID	ERP (W)	Class	FCC info
W240BY	(95.9 FM) FM	Blue Mountain, Alabama		6	D	
