= Alfond Sports Arena =

Ice hockey arena in Orono, Maine, US

Coordinates: 44°54′16.34″N 68°40′25.02″W

Harold Alfond Sports Arena
- "The Alfond"
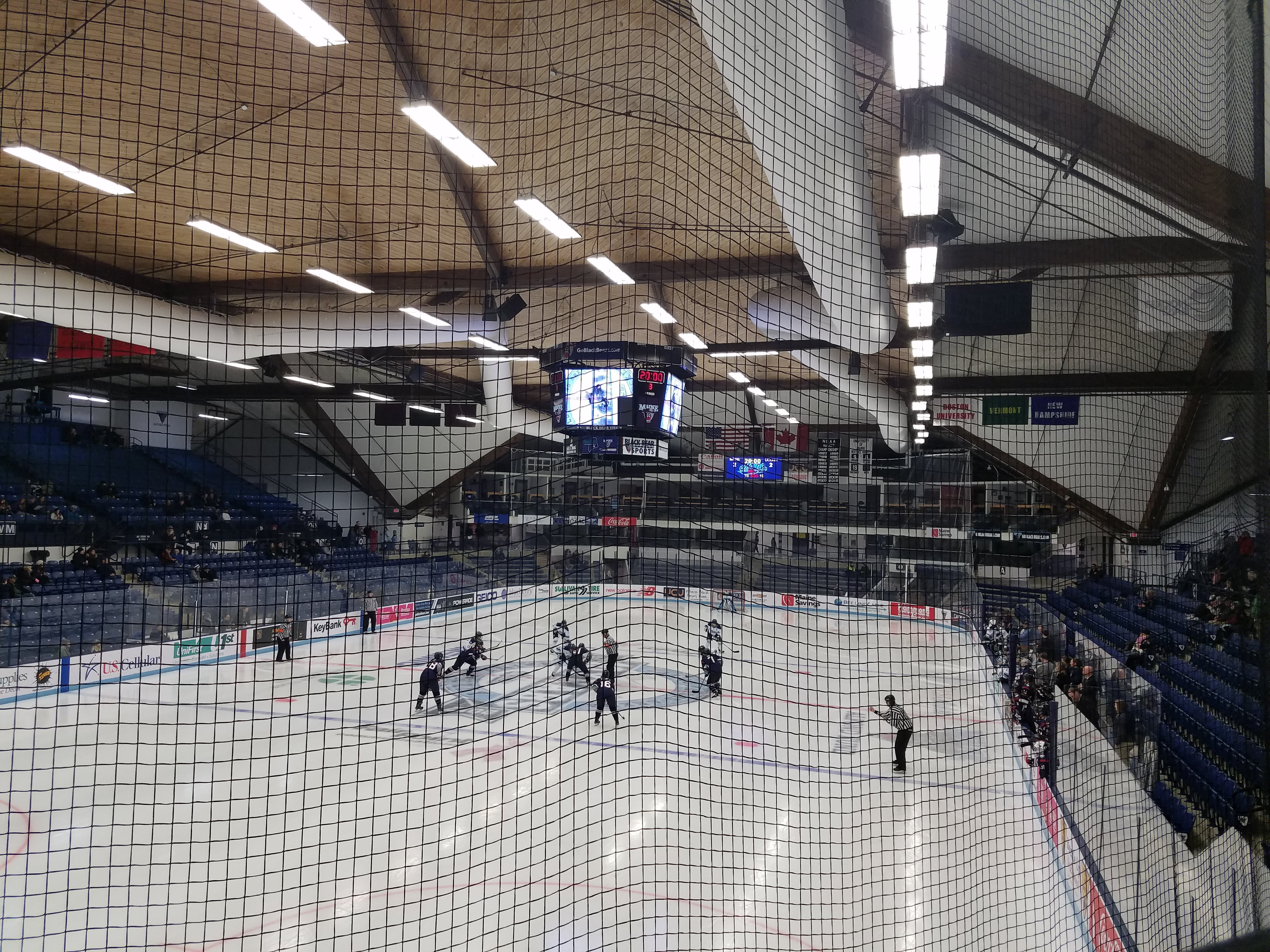
- Interactive map of Harold Alfond Sports Arena
- Location: College Ave; Orono, Maine 04473
- Owner: University of Maine
- Operator: University of Maine
- Capacity: 5,712 (basketball); 5,125 (hockey)
- Surface: 200 x 85 ft (hockey)

Construction
- Groundbreaking: 1976
- Opened: February 5, 1977
- Expanded: 1991, 1998, 2011
- Cost: $1.6 million ($8.5 million in 2025 dollars)
- Architect: Daniel Tulley Associates

Tenants
- Maine Black Bears men's and women's ice hockey

Harold Alfond Sports Arena is a multi-purpose arena in Orono, Maine, United States. The arena opened in 1977. It is home to the University of Maine Black Bears ice hockey teams. It is recognizable for its distinctive hyperbolic paraboloid architecture. The multi-angular roof design can also be found at Finneran Pavilion at Villanova University, the Brown University Smith Swim Center and the Flynn Recreation Complex at Boston College. It is named for Harold Alfond, a longtime Maine booster, whose name also adorns Alfond Sports Stadium, the school's main outdoor stadium.

It was expanded in 1992 from its original capacity of 3,800 in order to accommodate more spectators and bring the basketball team back from its temporary home at the Bangor Auditorium. More skyboxes have been added since then, so the arena's capacity has been reduced. As of the 2022-2023 season, the capacity was 5,125 for hockey. The arena includes the Bear Necessities Fan Shop and the Maine Hockey Hall of Fame.

The Grateful Dead played in The Alfond on April 19, 1983. Scott Hamilton's Stars on Ice opened in Alfond Sports Arena in 1986. Hillary Clinton appeared at the arena in 1994. It takes two hours to make the transition from basketball to hockey, and about 2½ from hockey to basketball. New, energy-efficient lighting was installed in late 2006 because of previous power outages and too much electricity consumption. A new scoreboard was installed during the summer of 2008. A new basketball floor was purchased in late 2009 to replace the original floor first used in 1992. A $4.8 million renovation project began in May 2011. The renovation included a new ice system along with dehumidifier equipment, new dasher boards and glass, and new lower-level seating.

The Dalhousie Memorial Arena (1982–2012) at Dalhousie University in Halifax, Canada was inspired by the Alfond Sports Arena, which university president Henry Hicks reportedly admired.

== See also ==
- List of NCAA Division I basketball arenas
