= List of UMass Lowell River Hawks men's ice hockey seasons =

This is a season-by-season list of records compiled by Massachusetts–Lowell in men's ice hockey.

The University of Massachusetts Lowell has won three NCAA Championship in its history, all at the Division II level.

== Season-by-season results ==
Note: GP = Games played, W = Wins, L = Losses, T = Ties

NCAA D-I Champions	NCAA Frozen Four	Conference regular season champions	Conference Division Champions	Conference Playoff Champions

Season	Conference	Regular season (Note: Code explanation; GP—Games Played, W—Wins, L—Losses, T—Tied games, OTW—Overtime Wins, OTL—Overtime Loses, 3/SW—Win in 3 on 3 overtime or shootout, Pts—Points*)														Conference Tournament Results	National Tournament Results
Season	Conference	Conference									Overall					Conference Tournament Results	National Tournament Results
Season	Conference	GP	W	L	T	OTW	OTL	3/SW	Pts*	Finish	GP	W	L	T	%	Conference Tournament Results	National Tournament Results
Program began play as the 'Lowell Tech Terriers'
Richard Morrison (1967–1969)
1967–68	Independent	—	—	—	—	—	—	—	—	—	15	7	7	1	.500		
1968–69	ECAC 2	12	4	8	0	—	—	—	.333	—	13	4	9	0	.308		
Bill Riley Jr. (1969–1991)
1969–70	ECAC 2	14	8	6	0	—	—	—	.571	—	17	11	6	0	.647		
1970–71	ECAC 2	16	7	8	1	—	—	—	.469	—	18	9	8	1	.528		
Program moniker changed to 'Chiefs'
1971–72	ECAC 2	21	11	10	0	—	—	—	.524	—	23	12	11	0	.522	Lost Quarterfinal, 0–5 (Vermont)	
1972–73	ECAC 2	19	9	9	1	—	—	—	.500	—	23	12	10	1	.543		
Division II
1973–74	ECAC 2	20	7	12	1	—	—	—	.375	—	22	9	12	1	.432		
1974–75	ECAC 2	20	13	7	0	—	—	—	.650	8th	22	14	8	0	.636	Lost Quarterfinal, 1–8 (Merrimack)	
School merged with Lowell State College to form 'University of Lowell'
1975–76	ECAC 2	22	11	10	1	—	—	—	.523	—	22	11	10	1	.523		
1976–77	ECAC 2	25	16	8	1	—	—	—	.660	—	27	17	9	1	.648	Won Quarterfinal, 4–2 (Bowdoin); Lost Semifinal, 2–6 (Merrimack)	
1977–78	ECAC 2	22	16	5	1	—	—	—	.750	6th	24	17	6	1	.729	Won East Quarterfinal, 6–4 (American International); Lost Semifinal, 3–6 (Merrimack)	
1978–79	ECAC 2	26	21	5	0	—	—	—	.808	—	33	27	6	0	.818	Won East Quarterfinal, 7–3 (New Haven); Won Semifinal, 7–6 (Merrimack); Won Championship, 4–1 (Salem State)	Won Semifinal, 10–6 (Illinois–Chicago); Won Championship, 6–4 (Mankato State)
1979–80	ECAC 2	23	19	4	0	—	—	—	.826	3rd	30	23	7	0	.767	Won East Quarterfinal, 8–5 (New Haven); Won Semifinal, 4–2 (Holy Cross); Lost Championship, 0–4 (Merrimack)	Lost Semifinal, 1–8 (Mankato State); Won Third-place game, 8–7 (Merrimack)
1980–81	ECAC 2	21	18	3	0	—	—	—	.857	2nd	32	27	5	0	.844	Won East Quarterfinal, 4–3 (Colby); Won Semifinal, 6–3 (Bowdoin); Won Championship, 6–4 (Merrimack)	Won Semifinal, 8–7 (OT) (Mankato State); Won Championship, 5–4 (Plattsburgh State)
1981–82	ECAC 2	20	19	1	0	—	—	—	.950	1st	35	31	4	0	.886	Won East Quarterfinal, 8–2 (Holy Cross); Won Semifinal, 3–2 (OT) (New England College); Won Championship, 5–1 (Merrimack)	Won Quarterfinal series, 12–9 (Oswego State); Won Semifinal, 4–3 (Merrimack); Won Championship, 6–1 (Plattsburgh State)
1982–83	ECAC 2	18	18	0	0	—	—	—	1.000	1st	31	29	2	0	.935	Won East Quarterfinal, 9–1 (Saint Anselm); Won Semifinal, 5–1 (Salem State); Won Championship, 3–2 (OT) (Babson)	Won Quarterfinal series, 15–5 (Oswego State); Lost Semifinal, 1–4 (RIT); Won Third-place game, 5–3 (Babson)
Division I
1983–84	ECAC Hockey	–†	–†	–†	–†	–†	–†	–†	–†	–†	34	15	16	3	.485		
1984–85	Hockey East	34	11	21	2	–	–	–	24	5th	42	15	25	2	.381	Won Quarterfinal series, 2–1 (New Hampshire); Lost Semifinal, 5–6 (Boston College); Lost Consolation Game, 4–6 (Boston University)	
1985–86	Hockey East	34	5	27	2	–	–	–	12	T–6th	42	11	29	2	.286	Won Quarterfinal series, 7–6 (Northeastern); Lost Semifinal, 2–5 (Boston College); Won Consolation Game, 8–5 (Providence)	
1986–87	Hockey East	32	20	10	2	–	–	–	42	2nd	36	22	12	2	.639	Lost Semifinal, 4–5 (Maine)	
1987–88	Hockey East	26	12	14	0	–	–	–	24	4th	39	20	17	2	.538	Won Quarterfinal series, 8–5 (Boston College); Lost Semifinal series,3–4 (Northeastern)	Lost First round series, 5–11 (Wisconsin)
1988–89	Hockey East	26	4	21	1	–	–	–	9	7th	34	8	24	2	.265		
1989–90	Hockey East	21	5	14	2	–	–	–	12	7th	35	13	20	2	.403	Lost Quarterfinal series, 0–2 (Maine)	
1990–91	Hockey East	21	5	15	1	–	–	–	11	7th	34	10	23	1	.309	Lost Quarterfinal, 3–5 (Maine)	
School joined the Massachusetts state university system, becoming 'University of Massachusetts Lowell'
Bruce Crowder (1991–1996)
1991–92	Hockey East	21	6	11	4	–	–	–	16	6th	34	11	19	4	.382	Lost Quarterfinal, 0–7 (Providence)	
1992–93	Hockey East	24	10	13	1	–	–	–	21	T–4th	39	20	17	2	.538	Won Quarterfinal series, 1–0–1 (Providence); Lost Semifinal, 5–7 (Maine); Won Consolation Game, 5–4 (OT) (New Hampshire)	
1993–94	Hockey East	24	14	6	4	–	–	–	32	2nd	40	25	10	5	.688	Won Quarterfinal series, 2–0 (Merrimack); Won Semifinal, 4–2 (New Hampshire); Lost Championship, 2–3 (Boston University)	Won Regional Quarterfinal, 4–3 (Michigan State); Lost Regional semifinal, 1–2 (2OT) (Minnesota)
Program moniker changed to 'River Hawks'
1994–95	Hockey East	24	11	12	1	–	–	1	58	5th	41	17	19	4	.475	Won Quarterfinal, 5–2 (Northeastern); Lost Semifinal, 2–4 (Boston University); Lost Consolation Game, 0–6 (Maine)	
1995–96	Hockey East	24	16	6	2	–	–	1	85	2nd	40	26	10	4	.700	Won Quarterfinal series, 2–0 (Northeastern); Lost Semifinal, 2–5 (Maine); Lost Consolation Game, 3–7 (Boston University)	Won Regional Quarterfinal, 6–2 (Michigan State); Lost Regional semifinal, 3–5 (Colorado College)
Tim Whitehead (1996–2001)
1996–97	Hockey East	24	9	14	1	–	–	–	19	7th	38	15	21	2	.421	Won Quarterfinal series, 2–0 (Providence); Lost Semifinal, 2–3 (Boston University); Tied Consolation Game, 2–2 (OT) (Boston College)	
1997–98	Hockey East	24	11	10	3	–	–	–	25	5th	36	16	17	3	.486	Won Quarterfinal series, 2–1 (Northeastern); Lost Semifinal, 2–6 (Maine)	
1998–99	Hockey East	24	9	15	0	–	–	–	18	T–6th	36	17	19	0	.472	Lost Quarterfinal series, 0–2 (Boston College)	
1999–00	Hockey East	24	5	16	3	–	–	–	13	9th	34	9	22	3	.309		
2000–01	Hockey East	24	10	11	3	–	–	–	23	5th	38	19	16	3	.539	Won Quarterfinal series, 2–1 (New Hampshire); Lost Semifinal, 1–5 (Boston College)	
Blaise MacDonald (2001–2011)
2001–02	Hockey East	24	12	9	3	–	–	–	27	4th	38	22	13	3	.618	Won Quarterfinal series, 2–1 (Northeastern); Lost Semifinal, 3–4 (New Hampshire)	
2002–03	Hockey East	24	4	16	4	–	–	–	12	T–8th	36	11	20	5	.375	Lost Quarterfinal series, 0–2 (New Hampshire)	
2003–04	Hockey East	24	7	12	5	–	–	–	19	6th	40	15	18	7	.463	Lost Quarterfinal series, 0–2 (Massachusetts)	
2004–05	Hockey East	24	11	10	3	–	–	–	25	5th	36	20	12	4	.611	Lost Quarterfinal series, 0–2 (Maine)	
2005–06	Hockey East	27	11	14	2	–	–	–	24	7th	36	14	20	2	.514	Lost Quarterfinal series, 0–2 (Maine)	
2006–07	Hockey East	27	7	16	4	–	–	–	18	9th	36	8	21	7	.319		
2007–08	Hockey East	27	10	13	4	–	–	–	24	7th	37	16	17	4	.458	Lost Quarterfinal series, 1–2 (Boston University)	
2008–09	Hockey East	27	14	11	2	–	–	–	30	5th	38	20	16	2	.553	Won Quarterfinal series, 2–0 (Vermont); Won Semifinal, 3–2 (OT) (Northeastern); Lost Championship, 0–1 (Boston University)	
2009–10	Hockey East	27	12	11	4	–	–	–	28	T–3rd	39	19	16	4	.538	Lost Quarterfinal series, 1–2 (Maine)	
2010–11	Hockey East	27	4	21	2	–	–	–	10	10th	34	5	25	4	.206		
Norm Bazin (2011–Present)
2011–12	Hockey East	27	17	9	1	–	–	–	25	T–2nd	38	24	13	1	.645	Lost Quarterfinal series, 1–2 (Providence)	Won Regional semifinal, 4–3 (OT) (Miami); Lost Regional final, 2–4 (Union)
2012–13	Hockey East	27	16	9	2	–	–	–	34	1st	41	28	11	2	.707	Won Quarterfinal series, 2–0 (Maine); Won Semifinal, 2–1 (Providence); Won Championship, 1–0 (Boston University)	Won Regional semifinal, 6–1 (Wisconsin); Won Regional final, 2–0 (New Hampshire); Lost National semifinal, 2–3 (OT) (Yale)
2013–14	Hockey East	20	11	6	3	–	–	–	25	2nd	41	26	11	4	.683	Won Quarterfinal series, 2–1 (Vermont); Won Semifinal, 4–0 (Notre Dame); Won Championship, 4–0 (New Hampshire)	Won Regional semifinal, 2–1 (Minnesota State); Lost Regional final, 3–4 (Boston College)
2014–15	Hockey East	22	11	7	4	–	–	–	26	4th	39	21	12	6	.615	Won Quarterfinal series, 2–1 (Notre Dame); Won Semifinal, 4–1 (Vermont); Lost Championship, 3–5 (Boston University)	
2015–16	Hockey East	22	12	6	4	–	–	–	28	T–4th	40	25	10	5	.688	Won Quarterfinal series, 2–0 (Boston University); Won Semifinal, 2–1 (3OT) (Providence); Lost Championship, 2–3 (Northeastern)	Won Regional semifinal, 3–2 (OT) (Yale); Lost Regional final, 1–4 (Quinnipiac)
2016–17	Hockey East	22	14	7	3	–	–	–	29	T–1st	41	27	11	3	.695	Won Quarterfinal series, 2–1 (New Hampshire); Won Semifinal, 5–1 (Notre Dame); Won Championship, 4–3 (Boston College)	Won Regional semifinal, 5–0 (Cornell); Lost Regional final, 2–3 (OT) (Notre Dame)
2017–18	Hockey East	24	11	13	0	–	–	–	22	7th	36	17	19	0	.472	Lost Opening Round series, 0–2 (Merrimack)	
2018–19	Hockey East	24	12	7	5	–	–	–	29	4th	37	19	13	5	.581	Lost Quarterfinal series, 1–2 (Boston University)	
2019–20	Hockey East	24	12	7	5	–	–	–	29	3rd	34	18	10	6	.618	Tournament cancelled	
2020–21	Hockey East	16	7	8	1	1	1	0	.458	7th	20	10	9	1	.525	Won Opening Round, 5–3 (Vermont); Won Quarterfinal, 2–1 (Boston University); Won Semifinal, 6–5 (2OT) (Boston College); Lost Championship, 0–1 (Massachusetts)	
2021–22	Hockey East	24	15	8	1	1	0	1	46	T–2nd	35	21	11	3	.643	Won Quarterfinal, 7–2 (Merrimack); Lost Semifinal, 1–3 (Massachusetts)	Lost Regional semifinal, 2–3 (Denver)
2022–23	Hockey East	24	11	10	3	2	2	3	39	5th	36	18	15	3	.542	Won Quarterfinal, 2–1 (Connecticut); Lost Semifinal, 1–2 (2OT) (Merrimack)	
2023–24	Hockey East	24	4	17	3	1	4	0	18	11th	36	8	24	4	.278	Lost First Round, 0–1 (New Hampshire)	
2024–25	Hockey East	24	8	13	3	0	1	2	30	7th	36	16	16	4	.500	Won First Round, 3–2 (OT) (New Hampshire); Lost Quarterfinal, 1–7 (Maine)	
Totals											GP	W	L	T	%	Championships	
Regular season											1774	889	746	139	.540	3 ECAC 2 East Division Championships, 2 ECAC 2 Championships, 2 Hockey East Championships	
Conference Post-season											132	69	60	3	.534	4 ECAC 2 tournament championships, 3 Hockey East tournament championships	
NCAA Post-season											32	19	13	0	.594	5 NCAA D-II Tournament appearances, 9 NCAA D-I Tournament appearances	
Regular season and Post-season Record											1938	977	819	142	.541	3 NCAA D-II National Championships	

* Winning percentage is used when conference schedules are unbalanced.
† Lowell had been accepted into ECAC Hockey but had not yet begun a conference schedule.
