= List of Hockey East men's ice hockey tournament champions =

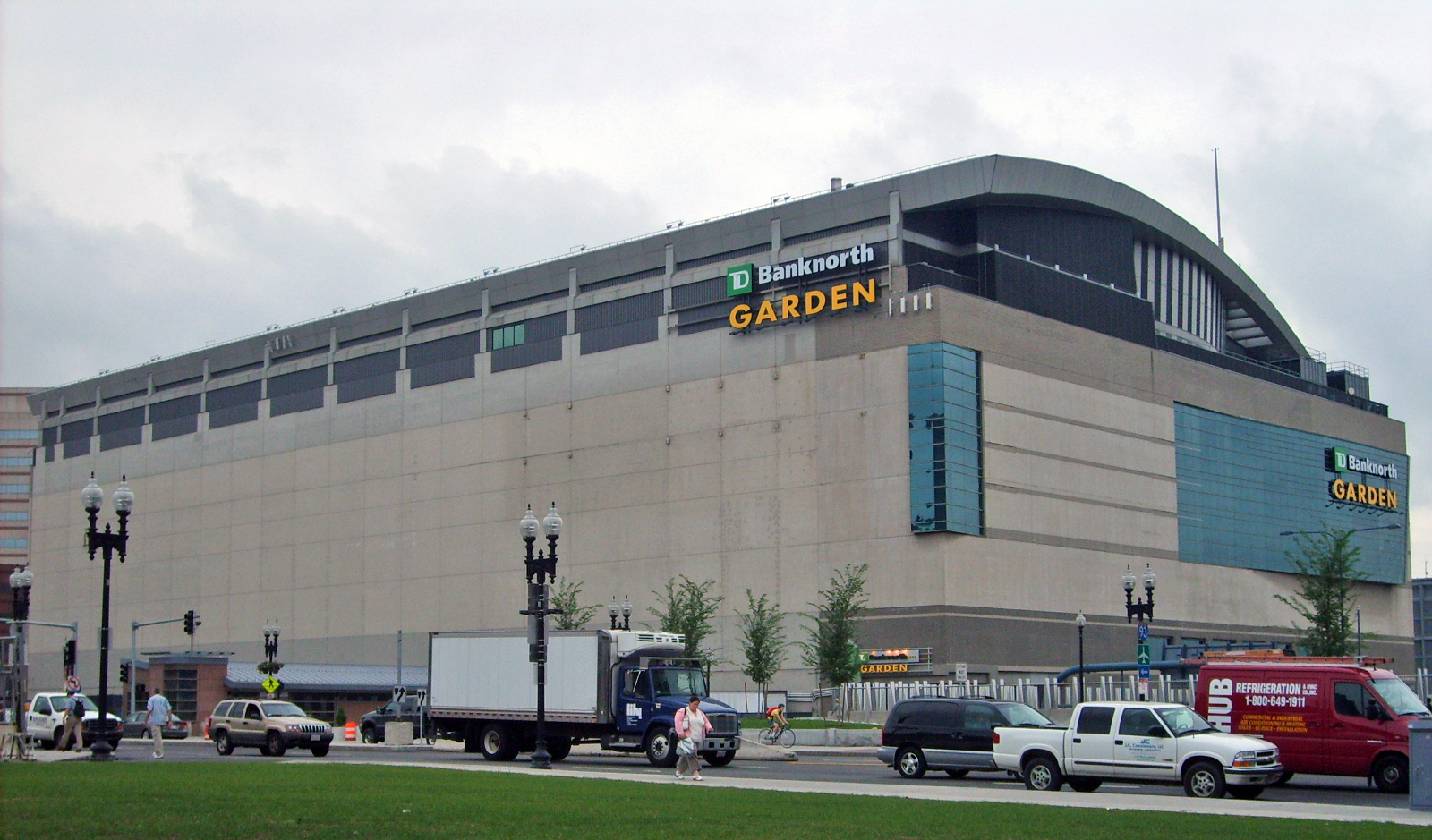
TD Garden (formerly the FleetCenter) has hosted the Hockey East Men's Ice Hockey Tournament since 1996.

The Hockey East is an NCAA Division I ice hockey-only conference based in Wakefield, Massachusetts, that was formed in 1984. At the end of each regular season, it holds the Hockey East Men's Ice Hockey Tournament to determine its conference champion. Since 1988, the winner of the conference tournament has been awarded the Lamoriello Trophy, named after the first commissioner of Hockey East, Lou Lamoriello.

== Champions ==
| Year | Winning team | Coach | Losing team | Coach | Score | Location | Venue | Reference |
|---|---|---|---|---|---|---|---|---|
| 1985 | Providence Friars | Steve Stirling | Boston College Eagles | Len Ceglarski | 2–1 (2OT) | Providence, Rhode Island | Providence Civic Center | |
| 1986 | Boston University Terriers | Jack Parker | Boston College Eagles | Len Ceglarski | 9–4 | Providence, Rhode Island | Providence Civic Center | |
| 1987 | Boston College Eagles | Len Ceglarski | Maine Black Bears | Shawn Walsh | 4–2 | Boston | Boston Garden | |
| 1988 | Northeastern Huskies | Fernie Flaman | Maine Black Bears | Shawn Walsh | 4–3 | Boston | Boston Garden | |
| 1989 | Maine Black Bears | Shawn Walsh | Boston College Eagles | Len Ceglarski | 5–4 | Chestnut Hill, Massachusetts | Kelley Rink | |
| 1990 | Boston College Eagles | Len Ceglarski | Maine Black Bears | Shawn Walsh | 4–3 | Chestnut Hill, Massachusetts | Kelley Rink | |
| 1991 | Boston University Terriers | Jack Parker | Maine Black Bears | Shawn Walsh | 4–3 (OT) | Boston | Boston Garden | |
| 1992 | Maine Black Bears | Shawn Walsh | New Hampshire Wildcats | Dick Umile | 4–1 | Boston | Boston Garden | |
| 1993 | Maine Black Bears | Shawn Walsh | Boston University Terriers | Jack Parker | 5–2 | Boston | Boston Garden | |
| 1994 | Boston University Terriers | Jack Parker | Massachusetts–Lowell Chiefs | Bruce Crowder | 3–2 | Boston | Boston Garden | |
| 1995 | Boston University Terriers | Jack Parker | Providence Friars | Paul Pooley | 3–2 | Boston | Boston Garden | |
| 1996 | Providence Friars | Paul Pooley | Maine Black Bears | Greg Cronin | 3–2 | Boston | FleetCenter | |
| 1997 | Boston University Terriers | Jack Parker | New Hampshire Wildcats | Dick Umile | 4–2 | Boston | FleetCenter | |
| 1998 | Boston College Eagles | Jerry York | Maine Black Bears | Shawn Walsh | 3–2 | Boston | FleetCenter | |
| 1999 | Boston College Eagles | Jerry York | New Hampshire Wildcats | Dick Umile | 5–4 (OT) | Boston | FleetCenter | |
| 2000 | Maine Black Bears | Shawn Walsh | Boston College Eagles | Jerry York | 2–1 | Boston | FleetCenter | |
| 2001 | Boston College Eagles | Jerry York | Providence Friars | Paul Pooley | 5–3 | Boston | FleetCenter | |
| 2002 | New Hampshire Wildcats | Dick Umile | Maine Black Bears | Tim Whitehead | 3–1 | Boston | FleetCenter | |
| 2003 | New Hampshire Wildcats | Dick Umile | Boston University Terriers | Jack Parker | 1–0 (OT) | Boston | FleetCenter | |
| 2004 | Maine Black Bears | Tim Whitehead | Massachusetts Minutemen | Don Cahoon | 2–1 (3OT) | Boston | FleetCenter | |
| 2005 | Boston College Eagles | Jerry York | New Hampshire Wildcats | Dick Umile | 3–1 | Boston | FleetCenter | |
| 2006 | Boston University Terriers | Jack Parker | Boston College Eagles | Jerry York | 2–1 (OT) | Boston | TD Banknorth Garden | |
| 2007 | Boston College Eagles | Jerry York | New Hampshire Wildcats | Dick Umile | 5–2 | Boston | TD Banknorth Garden | |
| 2008 | Boston College Eagles | Jerry York | Vermont Catamounts | Kevin Sneddon | 4–0 | Boston | TD Banknorth Garden | |
| 2009 | Boston University Terriers | Jack Parker | Massachusetts–Lowell River Hawks | Blaise MacDonald | 1-0 | Boston | TD Banknorth Garden | |
| 2010 | Boston College Eagles | Jerry York | Maine Black Bears | Tim Whitehead | 7–6 (OT) | Boston | TD Garden | |
| 2011 | Boston College Eagles | Jerry York | Merrimack Warriors | Mark Dennehy | 5–3 | Boston | TD Garden | |
| 2012 | Boston College Eagles | Jerry York | Maine Black Bears | Tim Whitehead | 4–1 | Boston | TD Garden | |
| 2013 | Massachusetts–Lowell River Hawks | Norm Bazin | Boston University Terriers | Jack Parker | 1–0 | Boston | TD Garden | |
| 2014 | Massachusetts–Lowell River Hawks | Norm Bazin | New Hampshire Wildcats | Dick Umile | 4–0 | Boston | TD Garden | |
| 2015 | Boston University Terriers | David Quinn | Massachusetts–Lowell River Hawks | Norm Bazin | 5–3 | Boston | TD Garden | |
| 2016 | Northeastern Huskies | Jim Madigan | Massachusetts–Lowell River Hawks | Norm Bazin | 3–2 | Boston | TD Garden | |
| 2017 | Massachusetts–Lowell River Hawks | Norm Bazin | Boston College Eagles | Jerry York | 4–3 | Boston | TD Garden | |
| 2018 | Boston University Terriers | David Quinn | Providence Friars | Nate Leaman | 2–0 | Boston | TD Garden | |
| 2019 | Northeastern Huskies | Jim Madigan | Boston College Eagles | Jerry York | 3–2 | Boston | TD Garden | |
| 2020 | Cancelled due to the coronavirus pandemic | | | | | | | |
| 2021 | Massachusetts Minutemen | Greg Carvel | Massachusetts–Lowell River Hawks | Norm Bazin | 1–0 | Amherst, Massachusetts | Mullins Center | |
| 2022 | Massachusetts Minutemen | Greg Carvel | Connecticut Huskies | Mike Cavanaugh | 2–1 (OT) | Boston | TD Garden | |
| 2023 | Boston University Terriers | Jay Pandolfo | Merrimack Warriors | Scott Borek | 3–2 (OT) | Boston | TD Garden | |
| 2024 | Boston College Eagles | Greg Brown | Boston University Terriers | Jay Pandolfo | 6–2 | Boston | TD Garden | |
| 2025 | Maine Black Bears | Ben Barr | Connecticut Huskies | Mike Cavanaugh | 5-2 | Boston | TD Garden | |
| 2026 | Merrimack Warriors | Scott Borek | Connecticut Huskies | Mike Cavanaugh | 2-1 | Boston | TD Garden | |

== Championships by school ==
| School | Championships | Championship Years |
|---|---|---|
| Boston College | 12 | 1987, 1990, 1998, 1999, 2001, 2005, 2007, 2008, 2010, 2011, 2012, 2024 |
| Boston University | 10 | 1986, 1991, 1994, 1995, 1997, 2006, 2009, 2015, 2018, 2023 |
| Maine | 6 | 1989, 1992, 1993, 2000, 2004, 2025 |
| UMass Lowell | 3 | 2013, 2014, 2017 |
| Northeastern | 3 | 1988, 2016, 2019 |
| UMass | 2 | 2021, 2022 |
| New Hampshire | 2 | 2002, 2003 |
| Providence | 2 | 1985, 1996 |
| Merrimack | 1 | 2026 |
| UConn | 0 | |
| Vermont | 0 | |
