= 2023–24 UMass Lowell River Hawks men's ice hockey season =

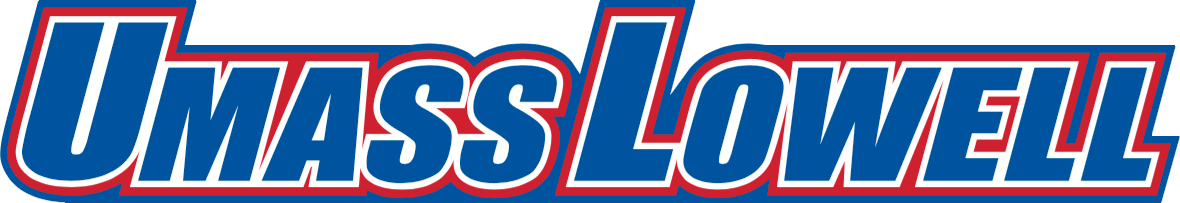
- Conference: 11th Hockey East
- Home ice: Tsongas Center

Rankings
- USCHO: NR
- USA Hockey: NR

Record
- Overall: 8–24–4
- Conference: 4–17–3
- Home: 2–11–3
- Road: 5–12–1
- Neutral: 1–1–0

Coaches and captains
- Head coach: Norm Bazin
- Assistant coaches: Andy Boschetto; Eric Sorenson; Dylan Zink; Tom Ford
- Captain(s): Ben Meehan; Jake Stella
- Alternate captain(s): Brehdan Engum; Owen Cole

The 2023–24 UMass Lowell River Hawks Men's ice hockey season was the 57th season of play for the program, the 41st competing at the Division I level and 40th in Hockey East. The River Hawks represented the University of Massachusetts Lowell in the 2023–24 NCAA Division I men's ice hockey season, played their home games at Tsongas Center and were coached by Norm Bazin in his 13th season.

== Season ==
Entering the year, Lowell was having to replace several of its key players; The top three scorers from last year were all gone, which was not ideal for a team that already had a hard time scoring. However, more critically, the River Hawks needed to find a way to replace its starting goaltender. Henry Welsch had shared the crease in '23 and was expected to compete for the job with Massachusetts transfer Luke Pavicich. At the start, the goaltending rotation looked like it was working when Lowell won 4 of its first 6 games while allowing less than 2 goals per. The tandem continued to play well in November, however, that when the lack of offense began to cost the team. The Hawks faced a gauntlet of highly-ranked opponents and lost four consecutive games, three by just a single goal. The losses dropped the squad to the bottom of the conference but there was still plenty of time to recover.

Unfortunately, from Thanksgiving on, the offense never could get on track. Over the final 24 games, Lowell managed 3 goals in just eight of their games and 4 goals in only two. They were shutout four separate times in that span and ended the regular season with just 39 goals in Hockey East play, by far the lowest mark in the conference. To make matters worse, Pavicich struggled in the second half of the season and his numbers ballooned. While Lowell's average goals against wasn't much much worse than their contemporaries, their nearly invisible offense left the team with no margin for error. The River Hawks finished last in the conference and ended with just 8 wins on the year, by far the worse season under Bazin.

In the conference tournament, the team continued the same trend and were unable to score a single goal. Even with Welsh holding New Hampshire to 1 goal, the team suffered its third consecutive blanking and quietly ended a forgettable year.

== Departures ==
Player	Position	Nationality	Cause
Nik Armstrong-Kingcade	Forward	United States	Graduation (retired)
Carl Berglund	Forward	Sweden	Graduation (signed with Edmonton Oilers)
Ryan Brushett	Forward	Canada	Graduation (retired)
Brian Chambers	Forward	United States	Graduate transfer to Arizona State
Gustavs Dāvis Grigals	Goaltender	Latvia	Graduation (signed with Milwaukee Admirals)
Zach Kaiser	Forward	Canada	Graduation (signed with Trois-Rivières Lions)
Marek Korenčík	Defenseman	Slovakia	Graduation (signed with Iowa Heartlanders)
Jon McDonald	Defenseman	United States	Graduation (signed with Toledo Walleye)
Blake Wells	Forward	Canada	Graduate transfer to American International

== Recruiting ==
Player	Position	Nationality	Age	Notes
Ben Brunette	Defenseman	Canada	21	North Bay, ON
Adam Cardona	Defenseman	Canada	19	Beaconsfield, QC
Nick Granowicz	Forward	United States	25	Macomb, MI; graduate transfer from Michigan
Jonathan Horn	Forward	United States	21	Southbury, CT
Sean Kilcullen	Defenseman	United States	21	Kensington, MD
Jaiden Moriello	Forward	United States	20	Saugus, MA
Shawn O'Donnell	Forward	United States	20	Pittsburgh, PA
Luke Pavicich	Goaltender	United States	21	Clarence Center, NY; transfer from Massachusetts
Alex Peterson	Forward	United States	21	Lansdale, PA; graduate transfer from Holy Cross
Ģirts Silkalns	Forward	Latvia	20	Talsi, LAT
Jak Vaarwerk	Forward	United States	20	East Amherst, NY

== Roster ==
As of September 21, 2023.

No.	Nat.	Player	Class	Pos	Height	Weight	DoB	Hometown	Previous team	NHL rights
1	(United States)	Luke Pavicich	Junior	G	6' 3" (1.91 m)	190 lb (86 kg)	2002-03-21	Clarence Center, New York	Massachusetts (HEA)	—
2	(United States)	Mitchell Becker	Sophomore	D	6' 3" (1.91 m)	220 lb (100 kg)	2001-05-24	Rogers, Minnesota	New Mexico Ice Wolves (NAHL)	—
4	(United States)	T. J. Schweighardt	Sophomore	D	5' 10" (1.78 m)	180 lb (82 kg)	2001-03-15	Wayne, New Jersey	Youngstown Phantoms (USHL)	—
5	(Canada)	Owen Cole	Junior	F	5' 10" (1.78 m)	173 lb (78 kg)	2000-01-29	Dunnville, Ontario	Brooks Bandits (AJHL)	—
6	(Sweden)	Isac Jonsson	Junior	D	5' 10" (1.78 m)	173 lb (78 kg)	2000-10-08	Ängelholm, Sweden	Tri-City Storm (USHL)	—
7	(Canada)	Mark Cooper	Sophomore	D	5' 10" (1.78 m)	185 lb (84 kg)	2001-03-01	Cambridge, Ontario	Hawkesbury Hawks (CCHL)	—
8	(United States)	Jaiden Moriello	Freshman	F	6' 2" (1.88 m)	190 lb (86 kg)	2003-05-04	Saugus, Massachusetts	West Kelowna Warriors (BCHL)	—
9	(United States)	Jack Collins	Sophomore	F	6' 4" (1.93 m)	215 lb (98 kg)	2001-11-13	Canton, New York	Lone Star Brahmas (NAHL)	—
10	(United States)	Brehdan Engum	Senior	D	6' 2" (1.88 m)	215 lb (98 kg)	2000-08-10	Burnsville, Minnesota	Waterloo Black Hawks (USHL)	—
11	(United States)	Alex Peterson	Graduate	F	5' 10" (1.78 m)	172 lb (78 kg)	1998-03-27	Lansdale, Pennsylvania	Holy Cross (AHA)	—
12	(Canada)	Roc Truman	Sophomore	F	6' 0" (1.83 m)	195 lb (88 kg)	2001-04-25	Lethbridge, Alberta	Camrose Kodiaks (AJHL)	—
13	(Sweden)	Filip Fornåå Svensson	Graduate	F	6' 4" (1.93 m)	215 lb (98 kg)	1999-01-05	Linköping, Sweden	Alaska (NCAA)	—
14	(United States)	Ben Meehan	Senior	D	6' 0" (1.83 m)	190 lb (86 kg)	2001-04-20	Walpole, Massachusetts	Cedar Rapids RoughRiders (USHL)	LAK, 140th overall 2020
16	(United States)	Owen Fowler	Sophomore	F	5' 9" (1.75 m)	182 lb (83 kg)	2002-06-04	Tewksbury, Massachusetts	Sioux City Musketeers (USHL)	—
17	(United States)	Jonathan Horn	Freshman	F	6' 0" (1.83 m)	190 lb (86 kg)	2002-02-16	Southbury, Connecticut	Vernon Vipers (BCHL)	—
18	(United States)	Sean Kilcullen	Freshman	D	6' 0" (1.83 m)	190 lb (86 kg)	2002-08-03	Kensington, Maryland	Maryland Black Bears (NAHL)	—
19	(United States)	Dillan Bentley	Sophomore	F	6' 4" (1.93 m)	190 lb (86 kg)	2001-03-31	Peoria, Illinois	New Mexico Ice Wolves (NAHL)	—
21	(Latvia)	Ģirts Silkalns	Freshman	F	6' 2" (1.88 m)	187 lb (85 kg)	2003-06-30	Talsi, Latvia	Fargo Force (USHL)	—
22	(Canada)	Adam Cardona	Freshman	D	6' 2" (1.88 m)	188 lb (85 kg)	2003-10-05	Beaconsfield, Quebec	Omaha Lancers (USHL)	—
23	(United States)	Shawn O'Donnell	Freshman	F	5' 11" (1.8 m)	181 lb (82 kg)	2003-06-21	Pittsburgh, Pennsylvania	Dubuque Fighting Saints (USHL)	—
24	(Canada)	Scout Truman	Sophomore	F	5' 10" (1.78 m)	185 lb (84 kg)	2002-10-15	Lethbridge, Alberta	Des Moines Buccaneers (USHL)	—
25	(United States)	Matt Crasa	Junior	F	5' 11" (1.8 m)	185 lb (84 kg)	2001-03-04	South Setauket, New York	Fargo Force (USHL)	—
26	(Canada)	Nick Rhéaume	Sophomore	F	6' 2" (1.88 m)	200 lb (91 kg)	2002-05-02	Trois-Rivières, Quebec	Prince George Spruce Kings (BCHL)	—
27	(United States)	Stefan Owens	Junior	F	5' 10" (1.78 m)	169 lb (77 kg)	2000-04-24	Midlothian, Virginia	Maine Nordiques (NAHL)	—
28	(Sweden)	Jake Stella	Senior	F	5' 11" (1.8 m)	187 lb (85 kg)	1998-11-14	Karlstad, Sweden	American International (AHA)	—
29	(United States)	Jak Vaarwerk	Freshman	F	6' 0" (1.83 m)	181 lb (82 kg)	2003-06-13	East Amherst, New York	Des Moines Buccaneers (USHL)	—
33	(United States)	Henry Welsch	Senior	G	6' 2" (1.88 m)	195 lb (88 kg)	2000-11-17	Lakeville, Minnesota	Aberdeen Wings (NAHL)	—
39	(Sweden)	Edvard Nordlund	Junior	G	6' 2" (1.88 m)	176 lb (80 kg)	2001-07-12	Nacka, Sweden	Danbury Jr. Hat Tricks (NAHL)	—
52	(Canada)	Ben Brunette	Freshman	D	6' 0" (1.83 m)	192 lb (87 kg)	2002-08-01	North Bay, Ontario	Penticton Vees (BCHL)	—
71	(United States)	Nick Granowicz	Graduate	F	6' 1" (1.85 m)	174 lb (79 kg)	1998-03-28	Macomb, Michigan	Michigan (Big Ten)	—
77	(United States)	Gabe Blanchard	Junior	D	6' 0" (1.83 m)	195 lb (88 kg)	2000-09-15	East Aurora, New York	Sioux City Musketeers (USHL)	—

== Standings ==
2023–24 Hockey East Standings
	Conference record										Overall record					
	GP	W	L	T	OTW	OTL	SW	PTS	GF	GA	GP	W	L	T	GF	GA
#2 Boston College †*	24	20	3	1	1	0	1	61	105	56	41	34	6	1	183	89
#3 Boston University	24	18	4	2	1	1	1	57	104	53	40	28	10	2	163	97
#10 Maine	24	14	9	1	0	1	0	44	76	67	37	23	12	2	119	94
#16 Providence	24	11	9	4	3	1	2	37	66	58	35	18	13	4	100	83
#13 Massachusetts	24	12	10	2	4	2	0	36	57	62	37	20	14	3	108	105
#20 New Hampshire	24	12	11	1	1	0	0	36	69	56	36	20	15	1	106	90
Northeastern	24	9	14	1	1	3	0	30	65	71	36	17	16	3	113	97
Connecticut	24	9	14	1	1	1	1	29	49	77	36	15	19	2	90	105
Vermont	24	7	14	3	1	0	3	26	52	81	35	13	19	3	87	106
Merrimack	24	6	17	1	0	1	1	21	62	85	35	13	21	1	98	114
Massachusetts Lowell	24	4	17	3	1	4	0	18	39	78	36	8	24	4	72	113
Championship: March 23, 2024 † indicates regular season champion * indicates conference tournament champion (Lamoriello Trophy); Rankings: USCHO Division I Men's Poll

== Schedule and results ==
Date	Time	Opponent^{#}	Rank^{#}	Site	TV	Decision	Result	Attendance	Record
Regular Season
October 7	8:07 PM	at Alaska Anchorage*		Avis Alaska Sports Complex • Anchorage, Alaska		Welsch	L 2–3 ^{OT}	750	0–1–0
October 8	8:07 PM	at Alaska Anchorage*		Avis Alaska Sports Complex • Anchorage, Alaska		Pavicich	W 2–1	650	1–1–0
October 20	7:00 pm	at Colgate*		Class of 1965 Arena • Hamilton, New York	ESPN+	Pavicich	W 4–2	847	2–1–0
October 21	7:00 pm	at Colgate*		Class of 1965 Arena • Hamilton, New York	ESPN+	Welsch	W 5–2	926	3–1–0
October 27	7:15 pm	Connecticut		Tsongas Center • Lowell, Massachusetts	ESPN+	Pavicich	L 1–2 ^{OT}	6,560	3–2–0 (0–1–0)
October 28	4:00 pm	at Connecticut		XL Center • Hartford, Connecticut	ESPN+	Welsch	W 1–0	2,902	4–2–0 (1–1–0)
November 3	7:00 pm	at #1 Boston College		Conte Forum • Chestnut Hill, Massachusetts	ESPN+	Welsch	L 2–3	6,608	4–3–0 (1–2–0)
November 4	6:05 pm	#1 Boston College		Tsongas Center • Lowell, Massachusetts	ESPN+	Pavicich	L 2–3	6,163	4–4–0 (1–3–0)
November 10	7:15 pm	#9 Boston University		Tsongas Center • Lowell, Massachusetts	ESPN+	Welsch	L 2–3	5,748	4–5–0 (1–4–0)
November 11	7:00 pm	at #9 Boston University		Agganis Arena • Boston, Massachusetts	ESPN+	Pavicich	L 1–6	4,819	4–6–0 (1–5–0)
November 15	7:00 pm	at Merrimack		J. Thom Lawler Rink • North Andover, Massachusetts	ESPN+, NESN	Welsch	T 1–1 ^{SOL}	2,576	4–6–1 (1–5–1)
November 18	6:05 pm	Merrimack		Tsongas Center • Lowell, Massachusetts	ESPN+	Welsch	W 3–2 ^{OT}	4,867	5–6–1 (2–5–1)
Turkey Leg Classic
November 24	4:00 pm	Bentley*		Tsongas Center • Lowell, Massachusetts (Turkey Leg Game 1)	ESPN+	Welsch	L 1–4	3,568	5–7–1
November 25	4:00 pm	Army*		Tsongas Center • Lowell, Massachusetts (Turkey Leg Game 2)	ESPN+	Pavicich	L 2–4	3,741	5–8–1
December 1	7:00 pm	at Connecticut		Toscano Family Ice Forum • Storrs, Connecticut	ESPN+, NESN	Welsch	L 0–2	2,630	5–9–1 (2–6–1)
December 3	4:00 pm	at Vermont		Gutterson Fieldhouse • Burlington, Vermont	ESPN+	Welsch	W 2–1	2,461	6–9–1 (3–6–1)
December 8	7:15 pm	Holy Cross*		Tsongas Center • Lowell, Massachusetts	ESPN+	Pavicich	T 2–2 ^{OT}	4,783	6–9–2
December 9	7:00 pm	at Holy Cross*		Hart Center • Worcester, Massachusetts	FloHockey	Welsch	L 2–4	1,008	6–10–2
December 30	4:00 pm	American International*		Tsongas Center • Lowell, Massachusetts	ESPN+	Welsch	L 3–4	4,468	6–11–2
Desert Hockey Classic
January 5	3:30 pm	vs. Omaha*		Mullett Arena • Tempe, Arizona (Desert Hockey Semifinal)		Pavicich	L 3–4 ^{OT}	4,764	6–12–2
January 6	5:30 pm	vs. Harvard*		Mullett Arena • Tempe, Arizona (Desert Hockey Consolation Game)		Pavicich	W 7–4	4,903	7–12–2
January 19	7:00 pm	at #8 Maine		Alfond Arena • Orono, Maine	ESPN+	Pavicich	L 3–5	5,043	7–13–2 (3–7–1)
January 20	7:00 pm	at #8 Maine		Alfond Arena • Orono, Maine	ESPN+	Pavicich	L 2–7	5,043	7–14–2 (3–8–1)
January 26	7:15 pm	#10 Providence		Tsongas Center • Lowell, Massachusetts	ESPN+	Pavicich	L 2–7	5,929	7–15–2 (3–9–1)
January 27	6:00 pm	at #10 Providence		Schneider Arena • Providence, Rhode Island	ESPN+	Pavicich	L 3–4 ^{OT}	2,270	7–16–2 (3–10–1)
February 2	7:15 pm	#1 Boston College		Tsongas Center • Lowell, Massachusetts	ESPN+	Welsch	L 1–6	6,421	7–17–2 (3–11–1)
February 9	7:15 pm	Vermont		Tsongas Center • Lowell, Massachusetts	ESPN+	Welsch	T 1–1 ^{SOL}	5,579	7–17–3 (3–11–2)
February 10	7:15 pm	Vermont		Tsongas Center • Lowell, Massachusetts	ESPN+	Welsch	T 3–3 ^{SOL}	4,002	7–17–4 (3–11–3)
February 16	7:15 pm	Northeastern		Tsongas Center • Lowell, Massachusetts	ESPN+	Welsch	W 4–2	5,426	8–17–4 (4–11–3)
February 17	7:00 pm	at Northeastern		Matthews Arena • Boston, Massachusetts	ESPN+	Welsch	L 0–4	3,002	8–18–4 (4–12–3)
February 24	6:05 pm	#12 Providence		Tsongas Center • Lowell, Massachusetts	ESPN+	Welsch	L 1–2	5,342	8–19–4 (4–13–3)
March 1	7:15 pm	#14 Massachusetts		Tsongas Center • Lowell, Massachusetts	ESPN+	Welsch	L 1–2 ^{OT}	5,268	8–20–4 (4–14–3)
March 2	6:00 pm	at #14 Massachusetts		Mullins Center • Amherst, Massachusetts	ESPN+	Pavicich	L 3–4 ^{OT}	6,289	8–21–4 (4–15–3)
March 8	7:15 pm	#18 New Hampshire		Tsongas Center • Lowell, Massachusetts	ESPN+, NESN	Welsch	L 0–4	4,986	8–22–4 (4–16–3)
March 9	7:00 pm	at #18 New Hampshire		Whittemore Center • Durham, New Hampshire	ESPN+, NESN	Pavicich	L 0–4	5,885	8–23–4 (4–17–3)
Hockey East Tournament
March 13	7:00 pm	at #17 New Hampshire*		Whittemore Center • Durham, New Hampshire (Opening Round)	ESPN+	Welsch	L 0–1	4,032	8–24–4
*Non-conference game. ^{#}Rankings from USCHO.com Poll. All times are in Eastern Time. Source:

== Scoring statistics ==
Name	Position	Games	Goals	Assists	Points	PIM
Scout Truman	LW	35	7	14	21	18
Owen Cole	C	36	10	7	17	8
Jak Vaarwerk	C	36	5	10	15	28
Nick Rhéaume	C/LW	34	9	4	13	32
Matthew Crasa	C/RW	34	8	5	13	16
Dillan Bentley	F	32	4	8	12	12
Isac Jonsson	D	36	3	9	12	2
Ben Meehan	D	25	1	11	12	31
Filip Fornåå Svensson	C/RW	35	5	4	9	6
Jake Stella	LW	29	3	6	9	12
Nick Granowicz	F	25	4	4	8	10
Mitchell Becker	D	30	3	3	6	12
Jaiden Moriello	RW	16	0	5	5	6
Jack Collins	F	20	3	2	5	4
Mark Cooper	D	23	1	3	4	6
Alex Peterson	F	30	1	3	4	16
T. J. Schweighardt	D	33	1	3	4	8
Brehdan Engum	D	34	0	4	4	39
Stefan Owens	F	34	1	1	2	2
Ģirts Silkalns	F	18	0	2	2	6
Sean Kilcullen	D	27	0	2	2	25
Roc Truman	F	2	1	0	1	0
Ben Brunette	D	13	1	0	1	4
Adam Cardona	D	15	1	0	1	8
Jonathan Horn	F	5	0	1	1	6
Shawn O'Donnell	F	10	0	1	1	6
Gabriel Blanchard	D	12	0	1	1	19
Luke Pavicich	G	17	0	1	1	0
Edvard Nordlund	G	2	0	0	0	0
Henry Welsch	G	22	0	0	0	0
Total			72	114	186	352

== Goaltending statistics ==
Name	Games	Minutes	Wins	Losses	Ties	Goals against	Saves	Shut outs	SV %	GAA
Henry Welsch	25	1250:43	5	13	4	51	499	1	.907	2.45
Luke Pavicich	17	914:58	3	11	0	55	423	0	.885	3.61
Edvard Nordlund	5	14:03	0	0	0	3	7	0	.700	12.81
Empty Net	-	24:28	-	-	-	4	-	-	-	-
Total	36	2204:12	8	24	4	113	929	1	.892	3.08

== Rankings ==
Poll	Week																										
Poll	Pre	1	2	3	4	5	6	7	8	9	10	11	12	13	14	15	16	17	18	19	20	21	22	23	24	25	26 (Final)
USCHO.com	NR	NR	NR	NR	NR	NR	NR	NR	NR	NR	NR	–	NR	NR	NR	NR	NR	NR	NR	NR	NR	NR	NR	NR	NR	–	NR
USA Hockey	NR	NR	NR	NR	NR	NR	NR	NR	NR	NR	NR	NR	–	NR	NR	NR	NR	NR	NR	NR	NR	NR	NR	NR	NR	NR	NR

Note: USCHO did not release a poll in weeks 11 and 25.
Note: USA Hockey did not release a poll in week 12.
