= 2019–20 UMass Lowell River Hawks men's ice hockey season =

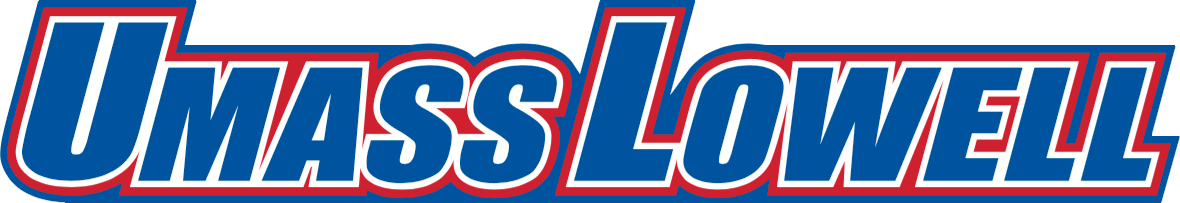
- Conference: 3rd Hockey East
- Home ice: Tsongas Center

Rankings
- USCHO: 12
- USA Today: 12

Record
- Overall: 18–10–6
- Conference: 12–7–5
- Home: 8–5–5
- Road: 10–5–1
- Neutral: 0–0–0

Coaches and captains
- Head coach: Norm Bazin
- Assistant coaches: Andy Jones; Juliano Pagliero; Tom Ford

The 2019-20 UMass Lowell River Hawks Men's ice hockey season was the 53rd season of play for the program, the 37th season competing at the Division I level, and the 36th season in the Hockey East conference. The River Hawks represented the University of Massachusetts Lowell and were coached by Norm Bazin, in his 9th season.

The Hockey East tournament as well as the NCAA Tournament were cancelled due to the COVID-19 pandemic before any games were played.

== Roster ==
As of August 1, 2019.

No.	Nat.	Player	Class	Pos	Height	Weight	DoB	Hometown	Previous team	NHL rights
1	(United States)	Logan Neaton	Freshman	G	6' 2" (1.88 m)	180 lb (82 kg)	1999-04-07	Brighton, Michigan	Prince George Spruce Kings (BCHL)	WPG, 144th overall 2019
2	(United States)	Dominick Procopio	Sophomore	D	6' 2" (1.88 m)	195 lb (88 kg)	1997-06-11	Grosse Pointe, Michigan	Shreveport Mudbugs (NAHL)	—
4	(United States)	Sam Knoblauch	Sophomore	F	6' 0" (1.83 m)	190 lb (86 kg)	1998-02-15	Rochester, Michigan	Carleton Place Canadians (CCHL)	—
5	(United States)	Chase Blackmun	Sophomore	D	6' 0" (1.83 m)	185 lb (84 kg)	1999-04-02	Hudson, Wisconsin	Cedar Rapids RoughRiders (USHL)	—
6	(Canada)	Jordan Schulting	Freshman	D	6' 0" (1.83 m)	185 lb (84 kg)	1999-08-06	Penticton, British Columbia	Coquitlam Express (BCHL)	—
7	(United States)	Kenny Hausinger	Senior	F	5' 9" (1.75 m)	200 lb (91 kg)	1995-07-21	Anchorage, Alaska	Des Moines Buccaneers (USHL)	—
8	(Canada)	Seth Barton	Sophomore	D	6' 3" (1.91 m)	185 lb (84 kg)	1999-08-18	Kelowna, British Columbia	Trail Smoke Eaters (BCHL)	DET, 81st overall 2018
9	(Canada)	Reid Stefanson	Sophomore	F	6' 0" (1.83 m)	180 lb (82 kg)	1997-02-20	Winnipeg, Manitoba	Sioux Falls Stampede (USHL)	—
10	(United States)	Matt Brown	Freshman	F	5' 8" (1.73 m)	180 lb (82 kg)	1999-08-09	Wood-Ridge, New Jersey	Des Moines Buccaneers (USHL)	—
11	(United States)	Jon McDonald	Sophomore	D	6' 0" (1.83 m)	180 lb (82 kg)	1998-06-15	Livonia, Michigan	Fargo Force (USHL)	—
12	(Canada)	Charlie Levesque	Junior	F	5' 10" (1.78 m)	175 lb (79 kg)	1998-05-29	Russell, Ontario	Hawkesbury Hawks (CCHL)	—
13	(United States)	Austin O'Rourke	Sophomore	F	6' 4" (1.93 m)	215 lb (98 kg)	1997-08-17	Canton, Georgia	Amarillo Bulls (NAHL)	—
16	(United States)	Colin O'Neill	Senior	F	5' 11" (1.8 m)	195 lb (88 kg)	1995-07-28	Odenton, Maryland	Okotoks Oilers (AJHL)	—
17	(Slovakia)	Marek Korenčík	Freshman	D	6' 3" (1.91 m)	200 lb (91 kg)	1999-07-19	Žilina, Slovakia	Luleå HF J20 (J20 SuperElit)	—
18	(Sweden)	Carl Berglund	Freshman	F	6' 2" (1.88 m)	195 lb (88 kg)	2000-01-16	Hammarö, Sweden	Sioux Falls Stampede (USHL)	—
19	(Canada)	Anthony Baxter	Junior	D	6' 0" (1.83 m)	185 lb (84 kg)	1997-11-26	Oakville, Ontario	Burlington Cougars (OJHL)	—
20	(Canada)	Cale List	Sophomore	D	6' 3" (1.91 m)	195 lb (88 kg)	1998-08-08	Petawawa, Ontario	Brooks Bandits (AJHL)	—
21	(United States)	Brian Chambers	Freshman	F	6' 0" (1.83 m)	175 lb (79 kg)	1998-07-24	Weymouth, Massachusetts	Sioux Falls Stampede (USHL)	—
22	(Canada)	Blake Wells	Freshman	F	6' 2" (1.88 m)	205 lb (93 kg)	1999-08-02	Blackie, Alberta	Okotoks Oilers (AJHL)	—
23	(Canada)	Zach Kaiser	Freshman	F	6' 1" (1.85 m)	185 lb (84 kg)	1998-09-06	Orangeville, Ontario	Sherwood Park Crusaders (AJHL)	—
24	(Canada)	Lucas Condotta	Sophomore	F	6' 2" (1.88 m)	220 lb (100 kg)	1997-11-06	Georgetown, Ontario	Markham Royals (OJHL)	—
25	(United States)	Nolan Sawchuk	Sophomore	D	5' 11" (1.8 m)	170 lb (77 kg)	1997-09-25	Burnsville, Minnesota	Minot Minotauros (NAHL)	—
26	(Sweden)	Andre Lee	Freshman	F	6' 4" (1.93 m)	205 lb (93 kg)	2000-07-26	Karlstad, Sweden	Sioux Falls Stampede (USHL)	LAK, 188th overall 2019
28	(United States)	Connor Sodergren	Junior	F	5' 11" (1.8 m)	190 lb (86 kg)	1996-09-11	Tewksbury, Massachusetts	West Kelowna Warriors (BCHL)	—
29	(United States)	Chris Schutz	Junior (RS)	F	6' 0" (1.83 m)	200 lb (91 kg)	1995-01-06	Keller, Texas	Robert Morris (AHA)	—
32	(United States)	Eric Green	Sophomore	G	6' 5" (1.96 m)	205 lb (93 kg)	1999-08-12	Easton, Connecticut	Northfield Mount Hermon School (USHS–MA)	—
33	(Canada)	Tyler Wall	Senior	G	6' 3" (1.91 m)	215 lb (98 kg)	1998-01-14	Leamington, Ontario	Leamington Flyers (GOJHL)	NYR, 174th overall 2016
34	(United States)	Derek Osik	Sophomore	F	6' 0" (1.83 m)	175 lb (79 kg)	1998-03-30	Shrewsbury, Massachusetts	South Shore Kings (NCDC)	—

== Standings ==
2019–20 Hockey East Standings
	Conference record							Overall record					
	GP	W	L	T	PTS	GF	GA	GP	W	L	T	GF	GA
#5 Boston College †	24	17	6	1	35	93	48	34	24	8	2	136	71
#9 Massachusetts	24	14	8	2	30	69	49	34	21	11	2	107	67
#12 Massachusetts–Lowell	24	12	7	5	29	60	60	34	18	10	6	90	79
#15 Maine	24	12	9	3	27	56	56	34	18	11	5	89	75
Connecticut	24	12	10	2	26	71	75	34	15	15	4	102	106
Boston University	24	10	9	5	25	69	64	34	13	13	8	103	98
#19 Northeastern	24	11	12	1	23	66	71	34	18	13	3	98	92
Providence	24	10	11	3	23	70	63	34	16	12	6	102	78
New Hampshire	24	9	12	3	21	54	69	34	15	15	4	91	97
Merrimack	24	7	14	3	17	63	77	34	9	22	3	85	123
Vermont	24	2	18	4	8	44	83	34	5	23	6	59	100
Championship: March 21, 2020 † indicates conference regular season champion * indicates conference tournament champion (Lamoriello Trophy); Rankings: USCHO.com Top 20 Poll

== Schedule and results ==
Date	Time	Opponent^{#}	Rank^{#}	Site	TV	Decision	Result	Attendance	Record
Regular Season
October 5	6:00 PM	vs. Alabama–Huntsville*		Tsongas Center • Lowell, Massachusetts		Wall	W 5–1	4,207	1–0–0
October 6	4:05 PM	vs. Alabama–Huntsville*		Tsongas Center • Lowell, Massachusetts		Wall	W 3–1	1,502	2–0–0
October 11	8:12 PM	at Minnesota-Duluth*		AMSOIL Arena • Duluth, Minnesota	FSN	Wall	W 3–1	6,041	3–0–0
October 12	8:07 PM	Minnesota-Duluth*		AMSOIL Arena • Duluth, Minnesota	NESN+	Wall	L 1–2	6,142	3–1–0
October 18	7:15 PM	vs. Colgate*	#18	Tsongas Center • Lowell, Massachusetts		Neaton	L 3–4 ^{OT}	3,964	3–2–0
October 19	6:05 PM	vs. Colgate*	#18	Tsongas Center • Lowell, Massachusetts		Wall	T 0–0 ^{OT}	5,045	3–2–1
October 25	7:05 PM	vs. Boston University		Tsongas Center • Lowell, Massachusetts	NESN	Wall	T 3–3 ^{OT}	4,592	3–2–2 (0–0–1)
October 26	7:00 PM	at #7 Providence		Schneider Arena • Providence, Rhode Island	NESN	Wall	W 3–2 ^{OT}	2,665	4–2–2 (1–0–1)
November 1	7:05 PM	at Vermont	#17	Gutterson Fieldhouse • Burlington, Vermont		Wall	W 2–1	3,224	5–2–2 (2–0–1)
November 2	7:00 PM	at Vermont	#17	Gutterson Fieldhouse • Burlington, Vermont		Wall	W 5–3	2,784	6–2–2 (3–0–1)
November 8	7:15 PM	vs. Maine	#14	Tsongas Center • Lowell, Massachusetts		Wall	T 1–1 ^{OT}	4,199	6–2–3 (3–0–2)
November 9	6:05 PM	vs. Maine	#14	Tsongas Center • Lowell, Massachusetts		Wall	W 3–2	4,077	7–2–3 (4–0–2)
November 15	7:05 PM	at Connecticut	#12	XL Center • Hartford, Connecticut		Wall	T 3–3 ^{OT}	2,730	7–2–4 (4–0–3)
November 16	7:00 PM	vs. Connecticut	#12	Tsongas Center • Lowell, Massachusetts		Wall	L 1–2	4,397	7–3–4 (4–1–3)
November 29	4:05 PM	vs. Rensselaer*	#15	Tsongas Center • Lowell, Massachusetts		Wall	W 4–0	3,512	8–3–4 (4–1–3)
November 30	6:05 PM	vs. #7 Penn State*	#15	Tsongas Center • Lowell, Massachusetts		Wall	W 3–2 ^{OT}	3,766	9–3–4 (4–1–3)
December 6	7:15 PM	at #15 Providence	#16	Schneider Arena • Providence, Rhode Island		Wall	W 3–2	1,997	10–3–4 (5–1–3)
December 7	6:00 PM	vs. #15 Providence	#16	Tsongas Center • Lowell, Massachusetts		Wall	L 1–4	4,033	10–4–4 (5–2–3)
December 29	5:00 PM	at CCHL All-Stars*	#14	Tsongas Center • Lowell, Massachusetts (Exhibition)		Neaton	W 3–1	2,346	
January 4	7:00 PM	at Merrimack	#13	J. Thom Lawler Rink • North Andover, Massachusetts		Wall	W 3–1	2,142	11–4–4 (6–2–3)
January 10	7:05 PM	at RIT*	#13	Gene Polisseni Center • Henrietta, New York		Wall	W 6–4	1,908	12–4–4 (6–2–3)
January 11	5:05 PM	at RIT*	#13	Gene Polisseni Center • Henrietta, New York		Neaton	L 2–3	2,604	12–5–4 (6–2–3)
January 17	7:15 PM	vs. #5 Boston College	#13	Tsongas Center • Lowell, Massachusetts		Wall	L 2–3	4,849	12–6–4 (6–3–3)
January 18	6:00 PM	vs. Merrimack	#13	Tsongas Center • Lowell, Massachusetts		Wall	W 6–4	4,219	13–6–4 (7–3–3)
January 24	7:30 PM	at Boston University	#12	Agganis Arena • Boston, Massachusetts		Wall	L 0–5	3,815	13–7–4 (7–4–3)
January 25	6:00 PM	vs. Boston University	#12	Tsongas Center • Lowell, Massachusetts	NESN	Wall	T 2–2 ^{OT}	6,234	13–7–5 (7–4–4)
February 7	7:00 PM	at #4 Boston College	#14	Conte Forum • Chestnut Hill, Massachusetts		Wall	W 3–2	4,298	14–7–5 (8–4–4)
February 8	7:00 PM	at Merrimack	#14	J. Thom Lawler Rink • North Andover, Massachusetts	NESN	Wall	W 4–3	2,064	15–7–5 (9–4–4)
February 14	7:15 PM	vs. #12 Northeastern	#11	Tsongas Center • Lowell, Massachusetts		Wall	L 0–3	4,513	15–8–5 (9–5–4)
February 15	8:00 PM	at #12 Northeastern	#11	Matthews Arena • Boston, Massachusetts		Wall	L 1–2	2,308	15–9–5 (9–6–4)
February 21	7:15 PM	vs. #8 Massachusetts	#14	Tsongas Center • Lowell, Massachusetts		Wall	W 3–2	6,474	16–9–5 (10–6–4)
February 22	7:00 PM	at #8 Massachusetts	#14	Mullins Center • Amherst, Massachusetts	NESN+	Wall	L 3–5	5,802	16–10–5 (10–7–4)
February 28	7:15 PM	vs. New Hampshire	#12	Tsongas Center • Lowell, Massachusetts		Wall	T 2–2 ^{OT}	5,085	16–10–6 (10–7–5)
February 29	7:00 PM	vs. New Hampshire	#12	Whittemore Center • Durham, New Hampshire		Wall	W 3–2	6,237	17–10–6 (11–7–5)
March 6	7:15 PM	vs. Connecticut	#12	Tsongas Center • Lowell, Massachusetts		Wall	W 3–1	4,802	18–10–6 (12–7–5)
Hockey East Tournament
Tournament Cancelled
*Non-conference game. ^{#}Rankings from USCHO.com Poll. All times are in Eastern Time.

== Scoring statistics ==
Name	Position	Games	Goals	Assists	Points	PIM
Matt Brown	LW	33	6	18	24	10
Carl Berglund	C/RW	34	12	11	23	12
Andre Lee	C/LW	33	8	12	20	30
Kenny Hausinger	C	29	7	12	19	20
Chase Blackmun	D	34	5	12	17	26
Connor Sodergren	F	31	8	8	16	37
Jon McDonald	D	25	4	11	15	10
Seth Barton	D	30	3	12	15	20
Colin O'Neill	F	34	6	8	14	10
Charlie Levesque	C	32	3	9	12	8
Lucas Condotta	F	34	4	6	10	14
Chris Schutz	F	23	5	3	8	2
Zach Kaiser	C/LW	30	5	3	8	4
Reid Stefanson	LW	14	1	7	8	4
Sam Knoblauch	RW	16	4	3	7	4
Anthony Baxter	D	33	3	3	6	38
Brian Chambers	RW	25	1	5	6	6
Marek Korenčík	D	33	2	3	5	8
Austin O'Rourke	F	27	2	2	4	18
Blake Wells	F	14	1	2	3	12
Nolan Sawchuk	D	23	0	3	3	8
Derek Osik	F	1	0	0	0	0
Logan Neaton	G	3	0	0	0	0
Cale List	D	13	0	0	0	2
Jordan Schulting	D	14	0	0	0	0
Dominick Procopio	D	31	0	0	0	4
Tyler Wall	G	32	0	0	0	0
Bench	-	-	-	-	-	6
Total			90	153	243	340

== Goaltending statistics ==
Name	Games	Minutes	Wins	Losses	Ties	Goals Against	Saves	Shut Outs	SV %	GAA
Tyler Wall	32	1939	18	8	6	68	924	2	.931	2.10
Logan Neaton	3	124	0	2	0	8	53	0	.869	3.85
Empty Net	-	13	-	-	-	3	-	-	-	-
Total	34	2077	18	10	6	79	977	2	.925	2.28

== Rankings ==
Poll	Week																							
Poll	Pre	1	2	3	4	5	6	7	8	9	10	11	12	13	14	15	16	17	18	19	20	21	22	23 (Final)
USCHO.com	NR	NR	18	NR	17	14	12	15	15	16	14	14	13	13	13	12	14	14	11	14	12	12	12	12
USA Today	NR	NR	NR	NR	NR	14	13	NR	NR	15	13	13	13	11	13	12	14	14	11	15	12	12	12	12

== Players drafted into the NHL ==
=== 2020 NHL entry draft ===
Round	Pick	Player	NHL team
5	140	Ben Meehan†	Los Angeles Kings

† incoming freshman
