= Joe Hulbig =

American ice hockey player (born 1973)

- Born: September 29, 1973 (age 52) Norwood, Massachusetts, U.S.
- Height: 6 ft 3 in (191 cm)
- Weight: 215 lb (98 kg; 15 st 5 lb)
- Position: Left wing
- Shot: Left
- Played for: Edmonton Oilers; Boston Bruins
- NHL draft: 13th overall, 1992; Edmonton Oilers
- Playing career: 1997–2004

Joseph Allan Hulbig (born September 29, 1973) is an American former professional ice hockey forward. He played left wing. He was selected in the first round of the 1992 NHL entry draft, 13th overall, by the Edmonton Oilers. He went on to play for the Oilers and Boston Bruins of the National Hockey League between 1997 and 2001, as well as four minor league teams in the American Hockey League. He retired in 2004.

== Career statistics ==
=== Regular season and playoffs ===
			Regular season					Playoffs
Season	Team	League	GP	G	A	Pts	PIM	GP	G	A	Pts	PIM
1989–90	Saint Sebastian's School	HS-Prep	30	13	12	25	—	—	—	—	—	—
1990–91	Saint Sebastian's School	HS-Prep	30	23	19	42	—	—	—	—	—	—
1991–92	Saint Sebastian's School	HS-Prep	17	19	24	43	30	—	—	—	—	—
1992–93	Providence College	HE	26	3	13	16	22	—	—	—	—	—
1993–94	Providence College	HE	28	6	4	10	36	—	—	—	—	—
1994–95	Providence College	HE	37	14	21	35	36	—	—	—	—	—
1995–96	Providence College	HE	31	14	22	36	56	—	—	—	—	—
1996–97	Edmonton Oilers	NHL	6	0	0	0	0	6	0	1	1	2
1996–97	Hamilton Bulldogs	AHL	73	18	28	46	59	16	6	10	16	6
1997–98	Edmonton Oilers	NHL	17	2	2	4	2	—	—	—	—	—
1997–98	Hamilton Bulldogs	AHL	46	15	16	31	52	3	0	1	1	2
1998–99	Edmonton Oilers	NHL	1	0	0	0	2	—	—	—	—	—
1998–99	Hamilton Bulldogs	AHL	76	22	24	46	68	11	4	2	6	18
1999–00	Boston Bruins	NHL	24	2	2	4	8	—	—	—	—	—
1999–00	Providence Bruins	AHL	15	4	5	9	17	—	—	—	—	—
2000–01	Boston Bruins	NHL	7	0	0	0	4	—	—	—	—	—
2000–01	Providence Bruins	AHL	36	4	11	15	19	15	2	2	4	20
2001–02	Providence Bruins	AHL	54	8	10	18	41	—	—	—	—	—
2001–02	Worcester IceCats	AHL	7	0	3	3	2	3	1	0	1	7
2002–03	Albany River Rats	AHL	35	11	9	20	20	—	—	—	—	—
2003–04	Albany River Rats	AHL	64	21	24	45	60	—	—	—	—	—
AHL totals			406	103	130	233	338	48	13	15	28	53
NHL totals			55	4	4	8	16	6	0	1	1	2

== Awards and honors ==
Award	Year
Hockey East All-Tournament Team	1996

Awards and achievements
Preceded by Bob Bell	William Flynn Tournament Most Valuable Player; 1996	Succeeded by Michel Larocque
Sporting positions
Preceded by Martin Ručinský	Edmonton Oilers first-round draft pick 1992	Succeeded by Jason Arnott
