= Lamoriello Trophy =

Trophy awarded to the champion of the Hockey East Men's Ice Hockey Tournament

- Sport: Ice hockey
- Awarded for: Hockey East Men's Ice Hockey Tournament champion

History
- First award: 1988
- First winner: Northeastern (1988)
- Most wins: Boston College (11)
- Most recent: Merrimack (2026) (1st title)

The Lamoriello Trophy is awarded annually to the champion of the Hockey East men's ice hockey tournament. The award came into existence on March 7, 1988 and is named for the first commissioner of Hockey East, Lou Lamoriello, who as of 2024 is the general manager for the New York Islanders of the National Hockey League. In 1998, a permanent trophy was commissioned, and in 1999, it was awarded for the first time, to the Boston College Eagles. The winner of the Lamoriello Trophy receives an automatic entry to the NCAA Division I Ice Hockey Tournament.

The 2020 tournament was cancelled due to the COVID-19 pandemic, therefore, the Lamoriello trophy was not awarded that year.

== Winners ==
Total awards won
Wins	Team
11	Boston College
9	Boston University
6	Maine
3	UMass Lowell
3	Northeastern
2	Massachusetts
2	New Hampshire
1	Merrimack
1	Providence

†	Eventual NCAA Division I Men's Ice Hockey Tournament champion

Year	Winner	Win #
1988	Northeastern	1
1989	Maine	1
1990	Boston College	1
1991	Boston University	1
1992	Maine	2
1993	Maine†	3
1994	Boston University	2
1995	Boston University†	3
1996	Providence	1
1997	Boston University	4
1998	Boston College	2
1999	Boston College	3
2000	Maine	4
2001	Boston College†	4
2002	New Hampshire	1
2003	New Hampshire	2
2004	Maine	5
2005	Boston College	5
2006	Boston University	5
2007	Boston College	6
2008	Boston College†	7
2009	Boston University†	6
2010	Boston College†	8
2011	Boston College	9
2012	Boston College†	10
2013	UMass Lowell	1
2014	UMass Lowell	2
2015	Boston University	7
2016	Northeastern	2
2017	UMass Lowell	3
2018	Boston University	8
2019	Northeastern	3
2020	Not awarded due to the COVID-19 pandemic	
2021	Massachusetts†	1
2022	Massachusetts	2
2023	Boston University	9
2024	Boston College	11
2025	Maine	6
2026	Merrimack	1

- List of Hockey East Men's Ice Hockey Tournament champions
