= Paul Pooley =

Canadian ice hockey player and coach

Current position
- Title: Associate head coach
- Team: Colorado College
- Conference: NCHC

Biographical details
- Born: August 2, 1960 (age 66); Exeter, Ontario, Canada
- Education: Ohio State University

Playing career
- 1980–1984: Ohio State
- 1984–1986: Sherbrooke Canadiens
- 1984–1986: Winnipeg Jets
- 1986–1987: Fort Wayne Komets
- Position: Forward

Coaching career (HC unless noted)
- 1988–1991: Ohio State (asst.)
- 1991–1994: Lake Superior State (asst.)
- 1994–2005: Providence
- 2005–2025: Notre Dame (asst.)
- 2025–present: Colorado College (asst.)

Head coaching record
- Overall: 185–187–40 (.498)
- Tournaments: 0–2 (.000)

Accomplishments and honors

Championships
- 1992 NCAA Championship (assistant); 1994 NCAA Championship (assistant); 1996 Hockey East Tournament Champion

Awards
- 2001 Hockey East Bob Kullen Award

Paul Robert Pooley (born August 2, 1960, in Exeter, Ontario) is a former professional ice hockey player who played 15 games in the National Hockey League with the Winnipeg Jets. He played his college hockey at Ohio State, where his number 22 has been retired. He is currently the associate head coach for Notre Dame's men's ice hockey team, a position he has held since 2005.

== Career statistics ==
=== Regular season and playoffs ===
| | | | Regular season | | | | | Playoffs |
| Season | Team | League | GP | G | A | Pts | PIM | GP | G | A | Pts | PIM |
|---|---|---|---|---|---|---|---|---|---|---|---|---|
| 1977–78 | North York Rangers | OPJAHL | — | — | — | — | — | — | — | — | — | — |
| 1977–78 | Kingston Canadians | OMJHL | 4 | 0 | 0 | 0 | 2 | 4 | 2 | 0 | 2 | 0 |
| 1978–79 | North York Rangers | OPJAHL | — | — | — | — | — | — | — | — | — | — |
| 1978–79 | Kingston Canadians | OMJHL | 60 | 14 | 20 | 34 | 21 | 11 | 3 | 7 | 10 | 4 |
| 1979–80 | North York Rangers | OPJAHL | 32 | 15 | 22 | 37 | 25 | — | — | — | — | — |
| 1980–81 | Ohio State University | CCHA | 38 | 28 | 32 | 60 | 41 | — | — | — | — | — |
| 1981–82 | Ohio State University | CCHA | 34 | 21 | 24 | 45 | 34 | — | — | — | — | — |
| 1982–83 | Ohio State University | CCHA | 36 | 33 | 36 | 69 | 50 | — | — | — | — | — |
| 1983–84 | Ohio State University | CCHA | 41 | 32 | 64 | 96 | 38 | — | — | — | — | — |
| 1984–85 | Sherbrooke Canadiens | AHL | 57 | 18 | 17 | 35 | 16 | 17 | 2 | 2 | 4 | 7 |
| 1984–85 | Winnipeg Jets | NHL | 12 | 0 | 2 | 2 | 0 | — | — | — | — | — |
| 1985–86 | Sherbrooke Canadiens | AHL | 70 | 20 | 21 | 41 | 31 | — | — | — | — | — |
| 1985–86 | Winnipeg Jets | NHL | 3 | 0 | 1 | 1 | 0 | — | — | — | — | — |
| 1986–87 | Fort Wayne Komets | IHL | 77 | 28 | 44 | 72 | 47 | 2 | 1 | 2 | 3 | 2 |
| NHL totals | | | 15 | 0 | 3 | 3 | 0 | — | — | — | — | — |

== Head coaching record ==
=== College ===
Record table
| Season | Team | Overall | Conference | Standing | Postseason |
|---|---|---|---|---|---|
Providence Friars (Hockey East) (1994–2005)
| 1994–95 | Providence | 14–17–6 | 7–11–6–3 | 6th | Hockey East Runner-Up |
| 1995–96 | Providence | 21–15–3 | 12–9–3–0 | 4th | NCAA West Regional Quarterfinals |
| 1996–97 | Providence | 15–20–1 | 12–11–1 | 4th | Hockey East Quarterfinals |
| 1997–98 | Providence | 15–18–3 | 9–13–2 | 7th | Hockey East Quarterfinals |
| 1998–99 | Providence | 20–17–1 | 12–11–1 | 4th | Hockey East Semifinals |
| 1999–00 | Providence | 18–18–2 | 10–13–1 | t-5th | Hockey East Quarterfinals |
| 2000–01 | Providence | 22–13–5 | 13–8–5 | t-2nd | NCAA West Regional Quarterfinals |
| 2001–02 | Providence | 13–20–5 | 8–13–3 | 7th | Hockey East Quarterfinals |
| 2002–03 | Providence | 19–14–3 | 12–9–3 | t-4th | Hockey East Quarterfinals |
| 2003–04 | Providence | 16–14–7 | 7–11–6 | 5th | Hockey East Quarterfinals |
| 2004–05 | Providence | 12–21–4 | 6–14–4 | 7th | Hockey East Quarterfinals |
| Providence: | | 185–187–40 | 108–123–29 | | |
| Total: | | 185–187–40 | | | |
National champion Postseason invitational champion Conference regular season champion Conference regular season and conference tournament champion Division regular season champion Division regular season and conference tournament champion Conference tournament champion

== Awards and honours ==
| Award | Year |
|---|---|
| All-CCHA Second Team | 1980–81 |
| All-CCHA First Team | 1983–84 |
| AHCA West First-Team All-American | 1983–84 |

Awards and achievements
| Preceded by Steve Mulholland | CCHA Rookie of the Year; 1980–81 (With Jeff Poeschl) | Succeeded by Jon Elliot |
| Preceded by Brian Hills | CCHA Player of the Year; 1983–84 | Succeeded by Ray Staszak |
| Preceded by Brian Hills | NCAA Ice Hockey Scoring Champion; 1983–84 | Succeeded by Bill Watson |
| Preceded by Jack Parker | Bob Kullen Coach of the Year Award; 2000–01 | Succeeded by Dick Umile |
