= Connor Hellebuyck =

American ice hockey player (born 1993)

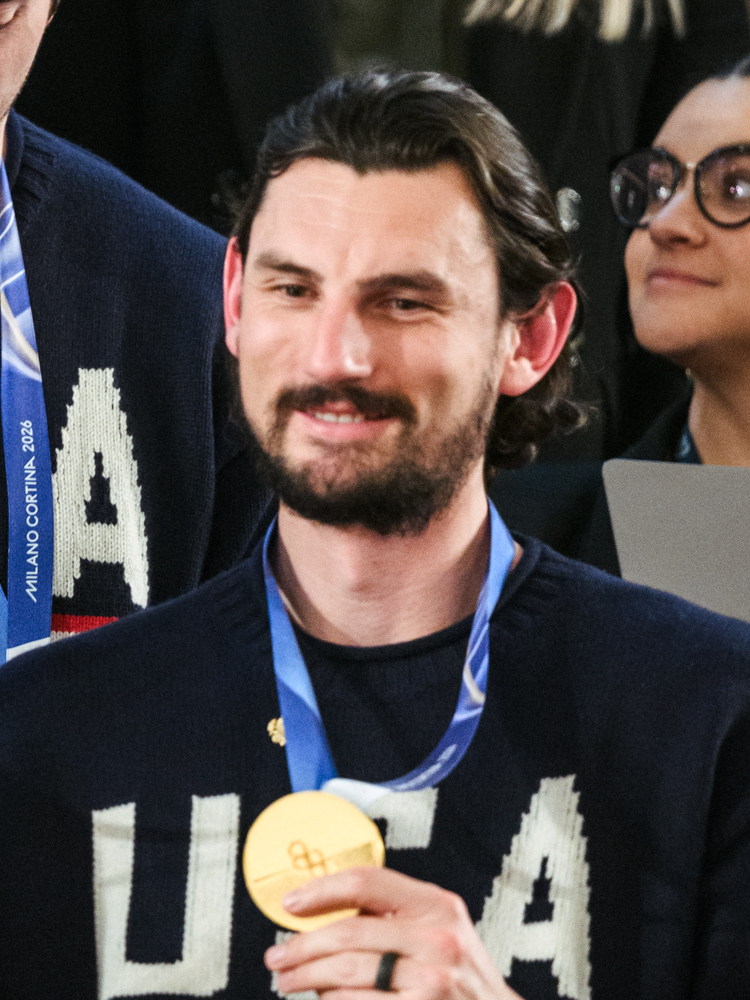
- Hellebuyck at the State of the Union Address in 2026
- Born: May 19, 1993 (age 33) Commerce, Michigan, U.S.
- Height: 6 ft 4 in (193 cm)
- Weight: 207 lb (94 kg; 14 st 11 lb)
- Position: Goaltender
- Catches: Left
- NHL team Former teams: New Jersey Devils; Winnipeg Jets
- National team: United States
- NHL draft: 130th overall, 2012; Winnipeg Jets
- Playing career: 2014–present

Connor Charles Hellebuyck (/ˈhɛləbʌk/ HEL-ə-buk; born May 19, 1993) is an American professional ice hockey player who is a goaltender for the New Jersey Devils of the National Hockey League (NHL).

After playing one season in the North American Hockey League with the Odessa Jackalopes, Hellebuyck was selected by the Winnipeg Jets in the fifth round, 130th overall, of the 2012 NHL entry draft. He spent two years with the UMass Lowell River Hawks, where he received the inaugural Mike Richter Award as the top goaltender in college hockey. Hellebuyck started his professional career during 2014–15 season with the Jets' American Hockey League affiliate, the St. John's IceCaps.

Hellebuyck began as a starter with the Jets during the 2016–17 season, where he quickly amassed success. Considered one of the best goaltenders in the NHL, Hellebuyck is a Hart Memorial Trophy winner as the league's most valuable player, three-time Vezina Trophy winner as the best goaltender in the league, and two-time William M. Jennings Trophy winner for allowing the fewest goals against.

Longtime Jets backup Eric Comrie has described Hellebuyck as possessing an exceptional hockey mind, stating that Hellebuyck regularly shares analytical breakdowns of the game that Comrie said he would never have conceived on his own.

Internationally, Hellebuyck represents the United States. At the 2026 Winter Olympics, he was their starting goaltender, helping them win Olympic gold for the first time since 1980, making 41 saves in a 2–1 victory, including recording an assist on the game winning goal by Jack Hughes. For his outstanding performance, U.S. President Donald Trump announced he would award Hellebuyck the Presidential Medal of Freedom, the highest civilian award in the United States. For his performance at the Olympics, he earned the nickname "The Secretary of Defense".

== Early life ==
Hellebuyck was born on May 19, 1993, in Commerce Township, Michigan, to parents Chuck and Erin. His father is a technical training engineer and former stock car racing driver, while his mother is an artist and children's books author. Hellebuyck is the middle of three siblings; his older brother Chris also played hockey before retiring in 2016–17. Growing up, Hellebuyck looked up to goaltender Olaf Kölzig.

== Playing career ==
=== Amateur ===
After completing his high school career at Walled Lake Northern High School in Commerce Township, Michigan, Hellebuyck played one year of junior hockey as a member of the Odessa Jackalopes, a franchise that had been a minor league affiliate of the New York Islanders but had recently moved to junior hockey as part of the North American Hockey League (NAHL). Hellebuyck went from being virtually unknown to a top prospect while playing in Odessa and was drafted by the Winnipeg Jets following his season in Odessa.

Hellebuyck earned a scholarship to play for the UMass Lowell River Hawks in the NCAA Men's Division I Hockey East Conference, where in two seasons he played 54 games and compiled a 38–12–2 record with a .946 save percentage, 1.60 goals against average and 12 shutouts. He won the Hockey East Championship and made a Frozen Four appearance in his freshman year. Lowell would repeat as Hockey East Champions the following year and Hellebuyck became the only player in Hockey East history to be named tournament MVP twice. Following his second year, Hellebuyck's outstanding play was rewarded with a selection to the 2013–14 All-Hockey East First Team.

For the 2013–14 season, Hellebuyck was awarded the inaugural Mike Richter Award as the top goaltender in college hockey. Hellebuyck departed UMass Lowell as the school's shutout leader with 12 shutouts in 54 games, surpassing former National Hockey League and former UMass Lowell goaltender Carter Hutton. He also owns single-season records for best save percentage (.952) and GAA (1.37), both in 2012–13.

=== Professional ===
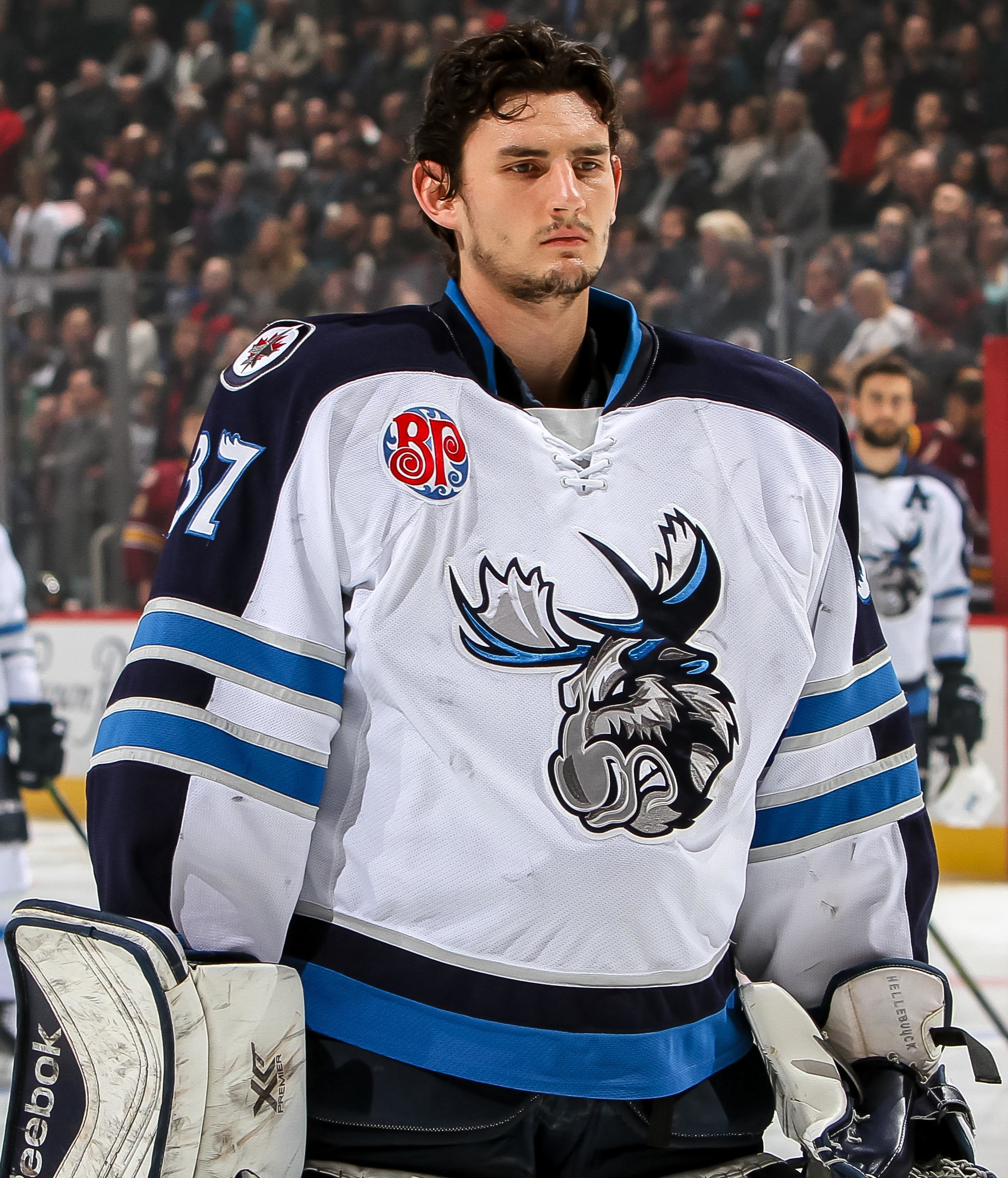
Hellebuyck during his tenure with the Manitoba Moose.

Hellebuyck chose to forgo his final two years of college eligibility by signing a three-year, entry-level contract with the Winnipeg Jets on April 5, 2014. He was immediately assigned to the St. John's IceCaps, the Jets' American Hockey League (AHL) affiliate, for the remainder of the season but did not play a game. When speaking of his decision, Hellebuyck said: "After two great years, I had to look at my career as a whole and think about my next step. After talking to both teams, it was a very difficult decision but I thought my play was ready for the next level." After being cut from the Winnipeg Jets' training camp, Hellebuyck spent the entirety of the 2014–15 season with the IceCaps. Hellebuyck started the season sharing the net with Peter Budaj but quickly became the IceCaps starter by mid-November. Through his first six starts, Hellebuyck earned his first professional shutout, had a .955 save percentage, and tied for eighth in the league in goals against average (GAA). He was recognized as the CCM/AHL Player of the Week for the period ending on November 23. During the week, Hellebuyck won all four of his starts while recording two shutouts. Although the IceCaps continued to struggle, with an Eastern Conference-worst goals against record, Hellebuyck tied for fourth among all goalies in wins, and third among league rookies in save percentage. He was subsequently selected for the 2015 AHL All-Star Game. When asked about Hellebuyck's start, IceCaps' head coach Keith McCambridge said: "I'm not one to use the word 'surprise' haphazardly, but yeah, I have been surprised." Hellebuyck recorded his fourth shutout of the season on February 7, 2015, against the Portland Pirates, and his fifth the following night against the Hartford Wolf Pack. On April 10, Hellebuyck was called up by the Jets to dress as the backup goaltender for one game. Hellebuyck finished his rookie season with a 28–22–5 record, 2.58 GAA, and 0.921 save percentage.

Following the 2014–15 season, the IceCaps moved to Winnipeg for the 2015–16 season and were renamed to the Manitoba Moose. After appearing in two preseason games with the Winnipeg Jets, Hellebuyck was reassigned to the Moose. He began the season in the starting role with Eric Comrie as his backup. Hellebuyck started in eight of the team's first eleven games while posting a 2.12 average and a .939 save percentage. On November 22, 2015, the Jets called up Hellebuyck after Ondřej Pavelec was injured during a game against the Arizona Coyotes. He made his NHL debut on November 27, against the Minnesota Wild, and stopped 15 shots on net in the 3–1 win. Hellebuyck also won his second NHL game on December 2, against the Toronto Maple Leafs with 32 saves in the 6–1 win. Later that month, on December 27, Hellebuyck recorded his first NHL shutout in a 1–0 win over the Pittsburgh Penguins. This was the Jets' first shutout of the season and ended their two-game losing streak. Despite remaining in the NHL, Hellebuyck was selected to represent the Manitoba Moose at the 2016 AHL All-Star Game. Hellebuyck returned to the AHL in January once Pavelec recovered from his injury. He finished his first stint in the NHL with a 13–11–0 record, 2.34 goals-against, and a .918 save percentage.

==== Winnipeg Jets (2015–2026) ====
===== Becoming the starter (2016–2019) =====
Hellebuyck attended the Winnipeg Jets training camp ahead of the 2016–17 season and made the team's opening night roster alongside Michael Hutchinson. Prior to opening night, he was granted permission from Dan Snyder's family to wear the jersey #37 in his honor. The number had not been worn by anyone in the Thrashers/Jets franchise since his death in 2003. Hellebuyck and Hutchinson shared the crease throughout the season, where both struggled to maintain consistency. By January, Hellebuyck had a 13–12–1 record through 26 games as the Jets were three points out of a playoff spot. Hellebuyck finished his rookie season with a 26–19–4 record through 56 games and a 2.89 goals-against average, .907 save percentage, and four shutouts. He also played the most games of any goaltender age 23 and younger in the NHL. On July 24, 2017, the Jets re-signed Hellebuyck to a one-year contract worth $2.25 million.

After making the opening night roster after the Jets' 2017–18 development camp, Hellebuyck played the majority of the season alongside Steve Mason. After Mason had a poor few games and suffered from a string of injuries, Hellebuyck became the de facto starter for the Jets for the remainder of the season. Hellebuyck excelled in his role as starter, recording 23 wins through 35 games including three shut outs, a .923 save percentage, and 2.36 GAA. Hellebuyck was also recognized as an NHL Star of the Week twice. The first time came on December 31 after he recorded a perfect 3–0–0 record, with a 1.67 goals-against average, .952 save percentage and one shutout over three games. His second Star of the Week honor came on January 22 after he stopped 59 of 60 shots against over two games. He was subsequently named to the 2017 NHL All-Star Game for the first time alongside teammate Blake Wheeler. On March 8, Hellebuyck set a franchise record for most wins in a season by a goaltender after making 41 saves to clinch his 35th win. Hellebuyck finished the season with a 44–11–9 record in 67 games, setting the record for the most single-season wins by an American goaltender in the NHL, previously held by Tom Barrasso of the Pittsburgh Penguins. He also tied with Wayne Stephenson for the record of most home wins by a goaltender in a single season with 30. Hellebuyck also set a franchise record with nine shutouts, a .924 save percentage, and nine straight wins to end the regular season. As a result of his successful play, Hellebuyck was named a Vezina Trophy runner-up as the league's top goaltender behind Pekka Rinne.

Hellebuyck and the Jets qualified for the 2018 Stanley Cup playoffs for the first time since 2015, after finishing second overall in the Central Division. Hellebuyck made his playoff debut in the Jets' first round series against the Minnesota Wild. Over five games against the Wild, Hellebuyck recorded two shutouts to lead the Jets to their first playoff series win in franchise history. Hellebuyck then set another franchise record by making 47 saves in game one of the second round against the Nashville Predators. This was the most saves in a playoff game in Jets/ Thrashers' franchise history. While the series was pushed to seven games, Hellebuyck made 36 saves in the 5–1 win to lead the Jets to the Western Conference final. Once the Jets were eliminated from the playoffs, Hellebuyck signed a six-year, $37 million contract extension.

In the first year of his new contract, Hellebuyck failed to match the success of his previous season. Through the first 23 games of the 2018–19 season, Hellebuyck maintained a 9–7–1 record, with a 2.98 GAA, and a .907 save percentage. As such, the Jets began relying more on backup Laurent Brossoit, who had a 4–1–1 record. Hellebuyck continued to struggle early in the season until November when he improved his record to 13–8–1. However, head coach Paul Maurice continued to rely on both Hellebuyck and Brossoit, saying: "We've got a luxury here....We've got two goaltenders that we really feel confident in playing." On December 31, 2018, Hellebuyck recorded his 100th career win against the Edmonton Oilers. By the NHL's bye week in late January, Hellebuyck ranked third among goaltenders with 21 wins. Through the month of March, Hellebuyck continued to improve and maintained a 2.62 GAA and a .922 save percentage. He also played in his 200th career NHL game on March 10, 2019, against the Washington Capitals. After earning his 14th career NHL shutout on March 23, Hellebuyck and the Jets qualified for the 2019 Stanley Cup playoffs. They faced off against the St. Louis Blues in the first round, where they fell in six games. Hellebuyck finished the 2018–19 regular season with 34 wins and 23 losses through 63 games.

===== Vezina Trophies, MVP, and trade request (2019–2026) =====
Hellebuyck started the 2019–20 season strong, allowing two goals or fewer in five of his first six starts. He recorded his first shutout of the season on October 20, 2019, against the Edmonton Oilers. On November 2, Hellebuyck set a personal career-best with 51 saves in a 3–2 win over the San Jose Sharks. This was also the most shots saved by a goaltender since the Jets moved to Winnipeg in 2011. By the end of December, Hellebuyck was tied for third in the league with 17 and led all goaltenders in shutouts. As a result, Hellebuyck was named to his second NHL All-Star Game alongside teammate Mark Scheifele. On January 14, 2020, Hellebuyck recorded his fourth shutout of the season to end the Jets' six-game losing streak. He also clinched the franchise record for most shutouts with 18, surpassing Ondrej Pavelec. Due to the COVID-19 pandemic, the regular season was paused on March 12, 2020. At the time of the pause, Hellebuyck ranked second in the NHL in wins with 31, first in shutouts, and seventh in save percentage among goalies who played at least 20 games. His efforts helped the Jets maintain a 37–28–6 record and advance to the 2020 Stanley Cup qualifiers once the NHL resumed play. The Jets faced off against the Calgary Flames in the qualifying round but were eliminated in four games. On September 21, before game two of the Stanley Cup Final, Hellebuyck was named the winner of the Vezina Trophy, becoming the first goalie in Winnipeg Jets/Atlanta Thrashers history to win the award.

Due to the COVID-19 pandemic, the 2020–21 season was pushed back until January 13, 2021, for a 56-game regular season. The Jets were also temporarily realigned into the North Division where they would only compete against Canadian teams. On February 4, Hellebuyck won his 153rd NHL game as the Jets beat the Calgary Flames 4–1, breaking the Jets/Thrashers franchise record for wins by a goaltender. The Jets experienced a four game winning streak through February which ended on February 29 against the Canucks. At the time, Hellebuyck and the Jets had maintained a winning 13–7–1 record. Through the first week of April, Hellebuyck won three consecutive games, including one shutout, and led the NHL in shots against, saves, and minutes played. In recognition of his efforts, Hellebuyck was named the NHL's First Star of the Week for the week ending on April 11. At the conclusion of the regular season, Hellebuyck ranked in the top five of the league with 23 wins and four shutouts through 44 games. Hellebuyck then played all four games of the Jets' sweep of the Edmonton Oilers in the North Division first round. However, the Jets were then swept in the North Division second round by the Montreal Canadiens.

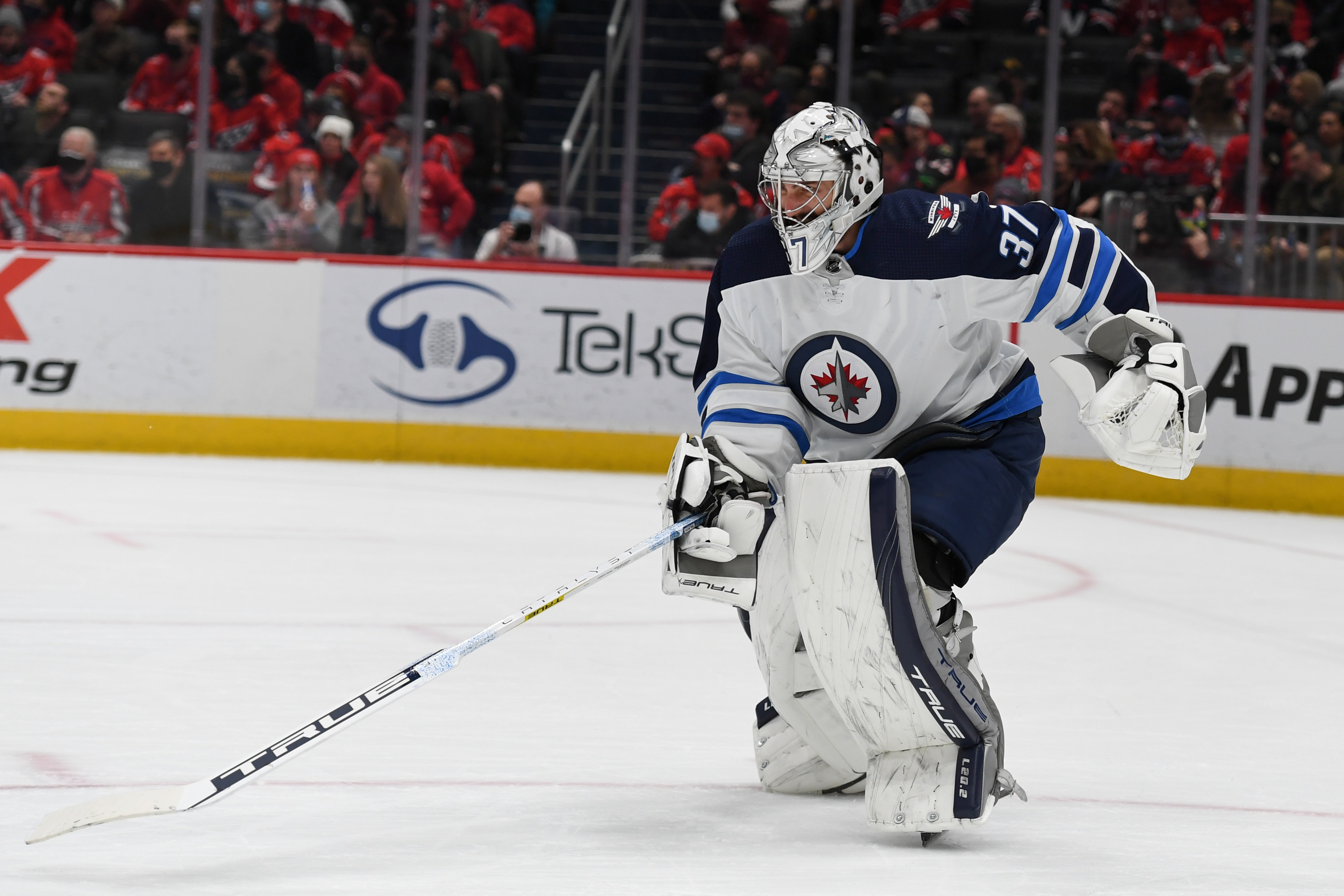
Hellebuyck during a game against the Washington Capitals in 2022.

During the 2022 offseason, Hellebuyck contracted COVID-19 which resulted in fatigue and headaches. Despite missing a spleen, Hellebuyck stated he handled the virus better than predicted. Although the NHL returned to pre-pandemic play, over 40 games were postponed due to concerns of the virus and the NHL's scheduled Christmas break was started 48 hours earlier. On April 24, 2022, Hellebuyck played in his 380th game as a Winnipeg Jet and he earned his 200th career win as the Jets beat the Colorado Avalanche 4–1 at home at the Canada Life Centre in Winnipeg. This also set a new franchise record for most games played and won by a Jets goaltender.

Hellebuyck was voted by fans to play in the 2023 NHL All-Star Game alongside Jets defenseman Josh Morrissey. Hellebuyck finished the 2022–23 season with a 37–25–2 record, 2.49 GAA, and a .920 save percentage. He tied for third in wins among NHL goaltenders and tied with Juuse Saros for most games played. He was named a Vezina Trophy finalist for the third time in his career.

On October 9, 2023, Hellebuyck along with Mark Scheifele, both signed a seven-year, $59.5 million contract extension with the Jets. The 2023–24 season proved a great success for the Jets. The team finished fourth in the NHL, while Hellebuyck had a 37–19–4 record, a 2.39 goals-against average, and a .921 save percentage. The Jets allowed a league-low 199 goals in 82 games, and as a result Hellebuyck received the William M. Jennings Trophy. He was the first Jets goaltender to win the award. He also won the Vezina Trophy for the second time in his career. The postseason ended in disappointment, with the Jets losing their first round series against the Colorado Avalanche in five games, with Hellebuyck's goaltending called into question.

Hellebuyck and the Jets started the 2024–25 season strong, winning eight consecutive games since opening night. During this run, Hellebuyck was named the NHL's Second Star of the Week for the week ending on October 13. He later made his 500th career start in an 8–3 win over the San Jose Sharks. Ultimately, the winning streak ended on October 29, in a 6–4 loss to the Toronto Maple Leafs. Later, in his 538th game, Hellebuyck attained his 300th win with a 5–2 home ice win against the Nashville Predators on January 7, 2025, becoming the third-fastest goaltender to 300 wins, after Andrei Vasilevskiy and Jacques Plante. Hellebuyck finished the regular season with 47 wins and a goals against average of 2.00, leading the league in both categories. The Jets allowed only 191 goals across 82 games, and he received the Jennings Trophy for the second consecutive year, in addition to being a Vezina Trophy finalist for the fifth (and third consecutive) time. For the first time, Hellebuyck was voted a finalist for the Hart Memorial Trophy, awarded by the Professional Hockey Writers' Association to the most valuable player of the regular season. On June 12, 2025, Hellebuyck was announced as the winner of both his third Vezina Trophy and first Hart Trophy, becoming the first goaltender to win the Hart since Carey Price in the 2014–15 season.

Hellebuyck started the 2025–26 season strong, posting a 8–6–0 record with a 2.51 goals-against average and a .913 save percentage through 14 games. On November 22, 2025, he had arthroscopic knee surgery to repair an injury from training camp and was expected to be out around four to six weeks. He came back earlier than expected on December 13, 2025 for Nino Niederreiter's 1,000th career NHL game. He posted a .960 save percentage, stopping 24 of the 25 shots he faced against the Washington Capitals. Hellebuyck and the Jets struggled to maintain their momentum and missed the playoffs. He finished the season with a record of 23–23–11, a goals against average of 2.86, and a save percentage of .895. Hellebuyck also recorded no shutouts for the first time in his career.

On August 27, 2026, Hellebuyck revealed to the public that he had requested a trade from the Jets "several months ago". The Jets had been listening to trade offers for Hellebuyck as early as June 26, though NHL insider Darren Dreger reported that the trade offers the Jets were receiving for Hellebuyck were "terrible". On September 16, Hellebuyck was suspended by the Jets after he failed to report to the team's training camp. Jets' fans opinions of Hellebuyck turned negative, seeing his trade request as a betrayal to the team. A website, Hellebucks.com, was created at the beginning of the 2026–27 season, which tracked the amount of salary Hellebuyck had forfeitted in real time. On October 2, Hellebuyck informed the Jets that he would report to the team for the 2026–27 season; his suspension was slated to end on October 23.

==== New Jersey Devils (2026–present) ====
On October 23, 2026, Hellebuyck was traded to the New Jersey Devils in exchange for Dawson Mercer, Nick Bjugstad, Nico Daws, Alexander Command, the Devils' 2027 seventh-round pick, and the Devils' 2029 second-round pick.

Hellebuyck picked up his first shutout with the Devils on November 8, against the Toronto Maple Leafs, where he made 23 saves in a 4–0 win. That same day, Devils general manager Sunny Mehta released a statement confirming that Hellebuyck would not be starting in the team's game against the Winnipeg Jets, citing "a reduction in our expected win probability", and that he would also be appearing in a press conference to discuss his motivations for requesting a trade. Hellebuyck appeared during warmups in Winnipeg on November 10, and was routinely booed by Jets fans both in warmups and throughout the game. The Devils lost the game 4–2 to the Jets.

== International play ==
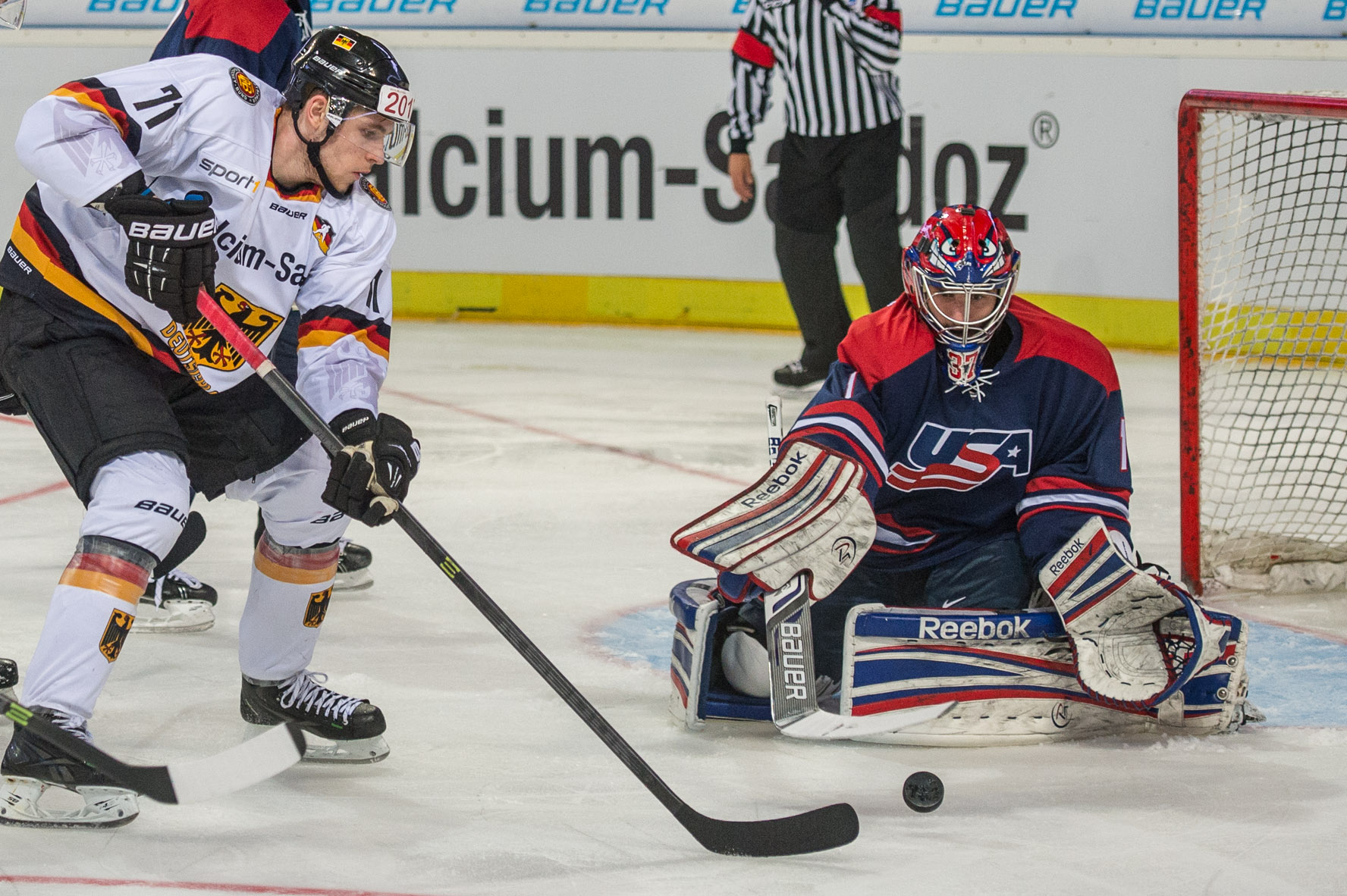
- Hellebuyck with the United States at a pre-tournament match in preparation for the 2014 World Championship

Medal record

Men's ice hockey

Representing the United States

Winter Olympics
Gold medal – first place	2026 Milano Cortina	

World Championships
Bronze medal – third place	2015 Czech Republic	

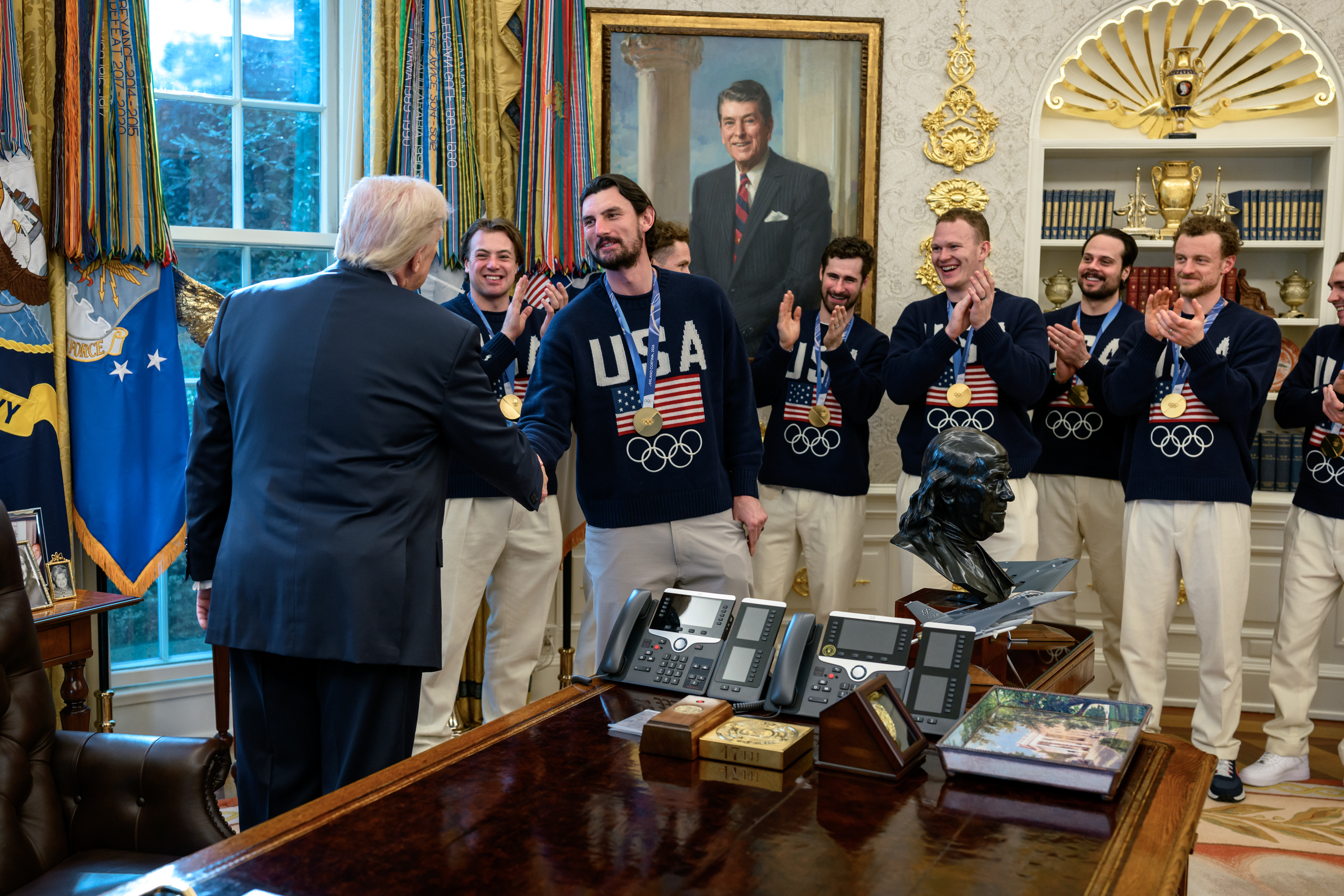
Shaking hands with President Trump during White House visit following winning the gold medal in the 2026 Winter Olympics.

Hellebuyck was chosen by the United States to play at the 2015 World Championship, and would backstop the United States to a bronze medal in the tournament. He posted a record of 7–1–0 with a pair of shutouts during his eight tournament games. He would also finish with a 1.37 goals-against average and a .948 saving percentage. His seven wins tied a U.S. record for most in a single tournament set in 1939. Hellebuyck had been named to the initial roster of Team North America for the 2016 World Cup of Hockey.

In February 2025, the NHL hosted the 4 Nations Face-Off, the first international tournament with full league participation in almost ten years. Hellebuyck was the starting goaltender for the Americans, who ultimately lost the final to Canada 3–2 in overtime.

On January 2, 2026, Hellebuyck was named to the United States roster for the 2026 Winter Olympics. He served as the team's starting goaltender during the men's tournament, in which the United States reached the championship final against Canada. He made 41 saves in the final, a new record for an Olympic final with NHL participation, playing a crucial role in the United States' 2–1 victory in overtime. Among Hellebuyck's key saves included breakaways from Connor McDavid and Macklin Celebrini. Teammate Matthew Tkachuk credited him with "one of the best performances of all time," and he was named both goalkeeper of the tournament and a tournament all-star.

Amid online backlash faced by the men's Olympic hockey team regarding the inclusion of FBI director Kash Patel during their gold medal celebrations and members of the team laughing at President Trump's comments of being impeached if he did not invite the women's team to the White House, the team was invited to meet with the president and attend the State of the Union. Hellebuyck was among the majority who visited with the president and attended the State of the Union. During the 2026 State of the Union, President Trump announced that he would receive the Presidential Medal of Freedom.

== Personal life ==
Hellebuyck and his wife Andrea have two children together. In 2023, Hellebuyck co-authored two children's books about mental health with Thom Van Dycke titled Bucky Beats the Blues and Is Something Wrong With Weasel?

== Career statistics ==
=== Regular season and playoffs ===
			Regular season									Playoffs
Season	Team	League	GP	W	L	OTL	MIN	GA	SO	GAA	SV%	GP	W	L	MIN	GA	SO	GAA	SV%
2011–12	Odessa Jackalopes	NAHL	53	26	21	5	3,085	128	3	2.49	.930	4	1	3	243	14	0	3.46	.934
2012–13	UMass-Lowell	HE	24	20	3	0	1,397	32	6	1.37	.952	—	—	—	—	—	—	—	—
2013–14	UMass-Lowell	HE	29	18	9	2	1,747	52	6	1.79	.941	—	—	—	—	—	—	—	—
2014–15	St. John's IceCaps	AHL	58	28	22	5	3,332	143	6	2.58	.921	—	—	—	—	—	—	—	—
2015–16	Manitoba Moose	AHL	30	13	15	1	1,735	72	4	2.49	.922	—	—	—	—	—	—	—	—
2015–16	Winnipeg Jets	NHL	26	13	11	0	1,423	56	2	2.34	.918	—	—	—	—	—	—	—	—
2016–17	Winnipeg Jets	NHL	56	26	19	4	3,034	146	4	2.89	.907	—	—	—	—	—	—	—	—
2017–18	Winnipeg Jets	NHL	67	44	11	9	3,966	156	6	2.36	.924	17	9	8	1,016	40	2	2.36	.922
2018–19	Winnipeg Jets	NHL	63	34	23	3	3,705	179	2	2.90	.913	6	2	4	360	16	0	2.67	.913
2019–20	Winnipeg Jets	NHL	58	31	21	5	3,269	140	6	2.57	.922	4	1	3	237	12	0	3.04	.904
2020–21	Winnipeg Jets	NHL	45	24	17	3	2,603	112	4	2.58	.916	8	4	4	538	20	1	2.23	.931
2021–22	Winnipeg Jets	NHL	66	29	27	10	3,904	193	4	2.97	.910	—	—	—	—	—	—	—	—
2022–23	Winnipeg Jets	NHL	64	37	25	2	3,778	157	4	2.49	.920	5	1	4	315	18	0	3.44	.886
2023–24	Winnipeg Jets	NHL	60	37	19	4	3,567	142	5	2.39	.921	5	1	4	275	24	0	5.23	.864
2024–25	Winnipeg Jets	NHL	63	47	12	3	3,741	125	8	2.00	.925	13	6	7	759	39	2	3.08	.866
2025–26	Winnipeg Jets	NHL	57	23	23	11	3,401	162	0	2.86	.895	—	—	—	—	—	—	—	—
NHL totals			625	345	208	55	36,400	1,568	45	2.58	.916	58	24	34	3,498	169	5	2.90	.903

=== International ===
Year	Team	Event	Result	GP	W	L	T	MIN	GA	SO	GAA	SV%
2015	United States	WC	3rd place, bronze medalist(s)	8	7	1	0	482	11	2	1.37	.948
2017	United States	WC	5th	2	2	0	0	120	5	0	2.50	.900
2025	United States	4NF	2nd place, silver medalist(s)	3	2	1	0	188	5	0	1.59	.932
2026	United States	OG	1st place, gold medalist(s)	5	5	0	0	305	6	0	1.18	.956
Senior totals				19	17	2	0	1095	27	2	1.42	.943

== Awards and honors ==
Award	Year	Ref
NAHL
NAHL Goaltender of the Year	2012	
College
Hockey East Tournament MVP	2013	
Hockey East All-Tournament Team	2013, 2014	
All-Hockey East First Team	2014	
AHCA East First-Team All-American	2014	
Mike Richter Award	2014	
NHL
NHL All-Star Game	2018, 2020, 2023, 2024	
NHL Second All-Star team	2018	
Vezina Trophy	2020, 2024, 2025	
NHL First All-Star team	2020, 2024, 2025	
William M. Jennings Trophy	2024, 2025	
Hart Memorial Trophy	2025	
International
World Championship All-Star team	2015	
Winter Olympics Best Goaltender	2026	
Winter Olympics All-Star team	2026	
Other
Presidential Medal of Freedom	2026	
American Academy of Achievement's Golden Plate Award	2026	

Awards and achievements
Preceded by Johnny Gaudreau	Hockey East Tournament MVP; 2013, 2014	Succeeded by Jack Eichel
Preceded by Parker Milner	Hockey East Goaltending Champion; 2012–13	Succeeded by Thatcher Demko
Preceded by Award created	Mike Richter Award; 2013–14	Succeeded by Zane McIntyre
Preceded by Andrei Vasilevskiy; Linus Ullmark	Vezina Trophy; 2020; 2024, 2025	Succeeded by Marc-André Fleury; Andrei Vasilevskiy
Preceded by Linus Ullmark; Jeremy Swayman	William M. Jennings Trophy; 2024, 2025	Succeeded by Mackenzie Blackwood; Scott Wedgewood
Preceded by Nathan MacKinnon	Hart Memorial Trophy; 2025	Succeeded by Nikita Kucherov
