= Norm Bazin =

American ice hockey player and coach (born 1971)

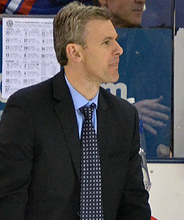

Current position
- Title: Head coach
- Team: Massachusetts Lowell
- Conference: Hockey East
- Record: 278–185–47 (.591)
- Annual salary: $465,000

Biographical details
- Born: January 18, 1971 (age 55); Notre-Dame-de-Lourdes, Manitoba, Canada

Playing career
- 1990–1994: UMass Lowell
- 1994–1995: Birmingham Bulls
- Position: Left wing

Coaching career (HC unless noted)
- 1997–2000: UMass Lowell (assistant)
- 2000–2008: Colorado College (assistant)
- 2008–2011: Hamilton
- 2011–present: UMass Lowell

Head coaching record
- Overall: 316–216–54 (.585)
- Tournaments: 6–6 (.500)

Accomplishments and honors

Championships
- 2013 Hockey East Champion; 2013 Hockey East Tournament champion 2014 Hockey East tournament champion 2017 Hockey East Champion; 2017 Hockey East tournament champion

Awards
- 2012 Bob Kullen Coach of The Year Award; 2012 Clark Hodder Coach of the Year Award; 2013 Bob Kullen Coach of The Year Award; 2013 Spencer Penrose Award; 2017 Bob Kullen Coach of The Year Award

Normand M. Bazin (born January 18, 1971) is the current head coach of the University of Massachusetts Lowell River Hawks men's ice hockey team. In 2013 he led the team to their first Hockey East Championship and their first appearance in the Frozen Four.

== Career ==
Bazin played left wing for the University of Massachusetts Lowell from 1990 (as the University of Lowell) until he graduated in 1994, where he played alongside future NHL goaltender Dwayne Roloson. He played one season with the ECHL Birmingham Bulls, before returning to Lowell to serve as an assistant coach under Tim Whitehead. After three years in Lowell he moved to an assistant position at Colorado College. During his tenure the Tigers won their regular season three times, made six appearances in the NCAA tournament and progressed to the Frozen Four in 2005. The team had a combined record of 205–103–22 between 2000 and 2008 with Bazin as assistant coach.

In 2008 he left the school to accept a head coaching position at Hamilton College in New York, where he coached the team to a regular season conference championship in 2011. That year Bazin was hired as head coach at UMass Lowell when Blaise MacDonald was fired at the end of a 5–24–4 season (a program low for Lowell since it entered Division I in 1984). Under Bazin's guidance, the River Hawks made two consecutive appearances in the NCAA Division I Ice Hockey Tournament, and won both the Hockey East regular season and the league tournament in 2013 (both program firsts).

== Car accident ==
In 2003 Bazin, then an assistant coach at Colorado College, was driving on U.S. Route 395 during a recruiting trip when his car was struck by a drunk driver. Rescuers needed over an hour to free Bazin from the wreckage, and he was rushed to Deaconess Medical Center in Spokane, with severe injuries that included a severed aorta. Bazin was given a 10% chance of survival, and was so close to death when he first arrived that a priest performed last rites. After 12 hours of surgery and 8 days in a medically induced coma, Bazin awoke but lingering injuries included a broken jaw, arms, shoulders, ribs, pelvis and legs, as well as bruising to his lungs and spleen.

After months of physical therapy, during which he used a wheelchair, Bazin fully recovered with no lasting health effects "worth mentioning". The story of his injury, recovery and subsequent success as head coach at his alma mater has been covered by several media outlets, including The Globe and Mail, which quoted the coach as saying that since the accident “I never have a bad day”. Bazin's second son Coleston is named for Dr. Daniel Coulston, the critical care physician who Bazin credits with saving his life.

== Head coaching record ==
Record table
Season	Team	Overall	Conference	Standing	Postseason
Hamilton Continentals (NESCAC) (2008–2011)
2008–09	Hamilton	9–15–1	8–11–0	T–7th	NESCAC Quarterfinals
2009–10	Hamilton	15–9–2	11–7–1	6th	NESCAC Semifinals
2010–11	Hamilton	14–7–4	11–4–4	1st	NESCAC Quarterfinals
Hamilton:		38–31–7 (.546)	30–22–5 (.570)		
Massachusetts–Lowell River Hawks (Hockey East) (2011–present)
2011–12	Massachusetts–Lowell	24–13–1	17–9–1	T–2nd	NCAA Regional Finals
2012–13	Massachusetts–Lowell	28–11–2	16–9–2	1st	NCAA Frozen Four
2013–14	Massachusetts–Lowell	26–11–4	11–6–3	2nd	NCAA Regional Finals
2014–15	Massachusetts–Lowell	21–12–6	11–7–4	4th	Hockey East Runner-Up
2015–16	Massachusetts–Lowell	25–10–5	12–6–4	T-4th	NCAA Regional Finals
2016–17	Massachusetts–Lowell	27–11–3	14–7–1	T-1st	NCAA Regional Finals
2017–18	Massachusetts–Lowell	17–19–0	11–13–0	7th	Hockey East First Round
2018–19	Massachusetts–Lowell	19–13–5	12–7–5	4th	Hockey East Quarterfinals
2019–20	Massachusetts–Lowell	18–10–6	12–7–5	3rd	Tournament cancelled
2020–21	Massachusetts–Lowell	10–9–1	7–8–1	7th	Hockey East Runner-up
2021–22	Massachusetts Lowell	21–11–3	15–8–1	T–2nd	NCAA Regional Semifinals
2022–23	Massachusetts Lowell	18–15–3	11–10–3	5th	Hockey East Semifinals
2023–24	Massachusetts Lowell	8–24–4	4–17–3	11th	Hockey East First Round
2024–25	Massachusetts Lowell	16–16–4	8–13–3	7th	Hockey East Quarterfinals
UMass Lowell:		278–185–47 (.591)	162–127–38 (.554)		
Total:		316–216–54 (.585)			
National champion Postseason invitational champion Conference regular season champion Conference regular season and conference tournament champion Division regular season champion Division regular season and conference tournament champion Conference tournament champion

Awards and achievements
Preceded by Jerry York Nate Leaman	Bob Kullen Coach of the Year Award; 2011–12; 2012–13; 2016–17	Succeeded by Jerry York; Jerry York
Preceded by Bob Daniels	Spencer Penrose Award; 2012–13	Succeeded by Rick Bennett
