= Dan Ronan =

Australian volleyball player (born 1975)

Personal information
- Nationality: Australian
- Born: 28 July 1975 (age 51); Bundaberg, Queensland
- Height: 198 cm (6 ft 6 in)
- Weight: 94 kg (14.8 st; 207 lb)

National team
2000	Australia

Dan Ronan (born 28 July 1975) is an Australian former volleyball player. He was part of the Australia men's national volleyball team. He competed with the national team at the 2000 Summer Olympics in Sydney, Australia, finishing 8th.
