= 1996 Hockey East men's ice hockey tournament =

1996 Hockey East Men's ice hockey tournament
- Dates: March 7–16, 1996
- Teams: 8
- Finals site: Fleet Center; Boston, Massachusetts
- Champions: Providence (2nd title)
- Winning coach: Paul Pooley (1st title)
- MVP: Joe Hulbig (Providence)
- Hockey East Men's Ice Hockey Tournaments

The 1996 Hockey East Men's Ice Hockey Tournament was the 12th tournament in the history of the conference. It was played between March 7 and March 16, 1996. Quarterfinal games were played at home team campus sites, while the final four games were, for the first time, played at the Fleet Center in Boston, Massachusetts, the home venue of the NHL's Boston Bruins. By winning the tournament, Providence received the Hockey East's automatic bid to the 1996 NCAA Division I Men's Ice Hockey Tournament.

== Format ==
The tournament featured three rounds of play. The team that finishes ninth in the conference is not eligible for tournament play. In the first round, the first and eighth seeds, the second and seventh seeds, the third seed and sixth seeds, and the fourth seed and fifth seeds played a best-of-three with the winner advancing to the semifinals. In the semifinals, the highest and lowest seeds and second-highest and second-lowest seeds play a single elimination game, with the winners advancing to the championship game and the losers meeting in a third-place game. The tournament champion receives an automatic bid to the 1996 NCAA Division I Men's Ice Hockey Tournament.

== Conference standings ==
Note: GP = Games played; W = Wins; L = Losses; T = Ties; SW = Shootout Wins; PTS = Points; GF = Goals For; GA = Goals Against

1995–96 Hockey East standings
	Conference								Overall					
	GP	W	L	T	SW	PTS	GF	GA	GP	W	L	T	GF	GA
Boston University†	24	17	5	2	1	90	132	79	40	30	7	3	236	125
Massachusetts–Lowell	24	16	6	2	1	85	114	96	40	26	10	4	200	156
Maine	24	14	6	4	2	80	102	75	39	26	9	4	164	112
Providence*	24	12	9	3	0	66	83	83	39	21	15	3	142	135
Boston College	24	12	10	2	1	65	89	102	36	16	17	3	126	147
New Hampshire	24	8	12	4	1	49	99	103	34	12	18	4	139	150
Northeastern	24	6	13	5	5	45	79	93	36	10	21	5	118	145
Massachusetts	24	4	16	6	4	36	81	120	35	10	19	6	119	161
Merrimack	24	4	18	2	0	24	83	111	34	10	19	5	123	130
Championship: Providence † indicates conference regular season champion * indicates conference tournament champion Final rankings: USA Today/American Hockey Magazine Coaches Poll Top 10 Poll

== Bracket ==
Teams are reseeded after the quarterfinals

Quarterfinals; March 7–9
1	Boston University	5	14	—
8	Massachusetts	2	1	—
2	Massachusetts-Lowell	7	4	—
7	Northeastern	3	3	—
(Pairings are reseeded after the first round)
3	Maine	4	8	—
6	New Hampshire	2	4	—
4	Providence	5	4	—
5	Boston College	2	2	—

Semifinals; March 15
1	Boston University	4
4	Providence	5
2	Massachusetts-Lowell	2
3	Maine	5

Championship; March 16
3	Maine	2
4	Providence	3
Third Place
1	Boston University	7
2	Massachusetts-Lowell	3

Note: * denotes overtime period(s)

=== Quarterfinals ===
==== (1) Boston University vs. (8) Massachusetts ====
March 8	Boston University	5 – 2	Massachusetts	Walter Brown Arena

March 9	Boston University	14 – 1	Massachusetts	Walter Brown Arena	Recap
(Kealty, Coleman) Shawn Bates - PP - 07:49 (unassisted) Chris Drury - PP GW - 07:57 (Drury, Kelleher) Doug Wood - PP - 15:09		First period	17:56 - PP - Brad Norton (Norris)
(Drury, Grier) Jay Pandolfo - 00:24 (Bates, Coleman) Chris O'Sullivan - 00:38 (Lachance) Shawn Bates - 14:14 (unassisted) Matt Wright - 15:05 (Ronan, Kealty) Albie O'Connell - PP - 15:49 (Kelleher, Wood) Albie O'Connell - PP - 19:47		Second period	No scoring
(Pierce) Bob Lachance - SH - 08:12 (Kealty, Ronan) John Hynes - SH - 09:37 (O'Connell, Wright) Doug Wood - PP - 10:23 (Pierce, Walsh) Dan Ronan - SH - 16:46 (unassisted) Bill Pierce - SH - 18:37		Third period	No scoring
(21 saves) Tom Noble (6 saves) P.J. McKersie		Goalie stats	Brian Regan (28 saves); Dave Kilduff (6 saves)

Boston University won series 2–0

==== (2) Massachusetts-Lowell vs. (7) Northeastern ====
March 8	Massachusetts-Lowell	7 – 3	Northeastern	Tully Forum

March 9	Massachusetts-Lowell	4 – 3	Northeastern	Tully Forum

Massachusetts-Lowell won series 2–0

==== (3) Maine vs. (6) New Hampshire ====
March 7	Maine	4 – 2	New Hampshire	Alfond Arena

March 8	Maine	8 – 4	New Hampshire	Alfond Arena

Maine won series 2–0

==== (4) Providence vs. (5) Boston College ====
March 7	Providence	5 – 2	Boston College	Schneider Arena

March 8	Providence	4 – 2	Boston College	Schneider Arena

Providence won series 2–0

=== Semifinals ===
==== (1) Boston University vs. (4) Providence ====
March 15	Boston University	4 – 5	Providence	Fleet Center

==== (2) Massachusetts-Lowell vs. (3) Maine ====
March 15	Massachusetts-Lowell	2 – 5	Maine	Fleet Center

=== Third Place ===
==== (1) Boston University vs. (2) Massachusetts-Lowell ====
March 16	Boston University	7 – 3	Massachusetts-Lowell	Fleet Center

=== Championship ===
==== (3) Maine vs. (4) Providence ====
March 16	Maine	2 – 3	Providence	Fleet Center

== Tournament awards ==
=== All-Tournament Team ===
- F Joe Hulbig* (Providence)
- F Mike Ornicioli (Providence)
- F Jay Pandolfo (Boston University)
- D Justin Gould (Providence)
- D Jeff Tory (Maine)
- G Dan Dennis (Providence)

* Tournament MVP(s)
