= Tim Whitehead (ice hockey) =

American ice hockey coach (born 1961)

Biographical details
- Born: 1961 (age 64–65); Trenton, New Jersey, U.S.
- Education: Hamilton College

Playing career
- 1981–1985: Hamilton
- Position: Forward

Coaching career (HC unless noted)
- 1988–1990: Middlebury (Assistant)
- 1990–1991: Maine (Assistant)
- 1991–1996: Massachusetts-Lowell (Assistant)
- 1996–2001: Massachusetts-Lowell
- 2001–2013: Maine
- 2013–present: Kimball Union Academy

Head coaching record
- Overall: 326–266–65 (.546) (college)

Accomplishments and honors

Championships
- 2004 Hockey East tournament champion

Awards
- 2002 Spencer Penrose Award

Tim Whitehead (born 1961) is an American ice hockey coach at Kimball Union Academy, a boarding school in Meriden, New Hampshire. He was formerly the head coach at Maine for 12 years and Massachusetts-Lowell for 5.

== Career ==
Whitehead spent four years at Hamilton College, graduating from the Division II school in 1985. After playing two years of professional hockey in Europe, Whitehead embarked on his coaching career, returning to the D-II college ranks as an assistant at Middlebury with Head Coach Bill Beaney for two years before joining the hockey program at Maine as a graduate-assistant coach with Shawn Walsh for the 1990–91 season. Whitehead's next stop was at Massachusetts-Lowell where he would remain as an assistant to Bruce Crowder for five years before replacing him in 1996. Whitehead would remain head coach of the River Hawks for a five seasons before returning to Maine to replace his former boss Shawn Walsh who succumbed to cancer prior to the 2001–02 season.

While only an interim head coach in his first season with the Black Bears, Whitehead led the team all the way to the NCAA title game, defeating UNH 7–2 in the semi-finals, then losing to Minnesota 4–3 in overtime at the Excel Energy Center in Minneapolis. Whitehead received the Spencer Penrose Award as the NCAA Division 1 National Coach of the Year for his efforts, as well as having the interim tag removed from his job title. Two years later Whitehead led Maine back to the national championship game, defeating Boston College 2–1 in the NCAA semi-finals at Boston Garden, then losing 1–0 to Denver. The Black Bears won the Hockey East Championship that season in a thrilling 2-1 triple overtime victory over UMass. Whitehead's success in Orono continued with NCAA Tournament appearances in 2005, 2006, and 2007, including two more trips to the Frozen Four in 2006 and 2007. After 4 Frozen Fours in 6 years, the Black Bears slumped in 2008 and 2009, but Maine bounced back with three consecutive winning seasons in 2010, 2011, and 2012, which included Hockey East championship games in 2010 and 2012, a 5-4 OT victory over rival UNH at the 2012 Frozen Fenway, and a return to the NCAA National Tournament in 2012. After an 11-win, injury-plagued season in 2012–13 Whitehead was released by an athletic department trying to find a way to boost its revenue stream. Overall, Whitehead's record at Maine was 250–171–54, while leading the Black Bears to 7 NCAA Tournament appearances, including 2 NCAA National Championship games, 4 NCAA Frozen Fours, and the 2004 Hockey East Championship.

Shortly after leaving Maine, Whitehead was named as the head coach for Kimball Union Academy promptly leading the prep school to a NEPSAC New England Championship in his first year behind the bench. After winning NEPSAC New England Championships in 2014, 2017, 2018, 2019, 2024, and 2025, Whitehead's career record at KUA stands at 316–68–19. In 2017, New England Hockey Journal named Whitehead one of the 100 Most Influential People in New England Hockey.

== Personal life ==
Tim lives in Meriden NH with his wife Dena and their two children, Natalie and Zach.

== Head coaching record ==
Record table
Season	Team	Overall	Conference	Standing	Postseason
Massachusetts–Lowell River Hawks (Hockey East) (1996–2001)
1996–97	Massachusetts-Lowell	15–21–2	9–14–1	7th	Hockey East Third-place game (Tie)
1997–98	Massachusetts-Lowell	16–17–3	11–10–3	5th	Hockey East Semifinals
1998–99	Massachusetts-Lowell	17–19–0	9–15–0	t-6th	Hockey East Quarterfinals
1999–00	Massachusetts-Lowell	9–22–3	5–16–3	9th	
2000–01	Massachusetts-Lowell	19–16–3	10–11–3	5th	Hockey East Semifinals
Massachusetts-Lowell:		76–95–11	44–66–10		
Maine Black Bears (Hockey East) (2001–2013)
2001–02	Maine	26–11–7	14–5–5	t-2nd	NCAA runner-up
2002–03	Maine	24–10–5	14–6–4	3rd	NCAA Midwest regional semifinals
2003–04	Maine	33–8–3	17–5–2	2nd	NCAA runner-up
2004–05	Maine	20–13–7	13–6–5	4th	NCAA West regional semifinals
2005–06	Maine	28–12–2	17–8–2	t-2nd	NCAA Frozen Four
2006–07	Maine	23–15–2	14–12–1	t-5th	NCAA Frozen Four
2007–08	Maine	13–18–3	9–15–3	9th	
2008–09	Maine	13–22–4	7–17–3	8th	Hockey East Quarterfinals
2009–10	Maine	19–17–3	13–12–2	t-3rd	Hockey East Runner-Up
2010–11	Maine	17–12–7	14–8–5	5th	Hockey East Quarterfinals
2011–12	Maine	23–14–3	15–10–2	4th	NCAA Northeast regional semifinals
2012–13	Maine	11–19–8	7–12–8	t-7th	Hockey East Quarterfinals
Maine:		250–171–54	154–116–42		
Total:		326–266–65			
National champion Postseason invitational champion Conference regular season champion Conference regular season and conference tournament champion Division regular season champion Division regular season and conference tournament champion Conference tournament champion

Awards and achievements
Preceded by Dean Blais	Spencer Penrose Award; 2001–02	Succeeded by Bob Daniels
