= 2013 Hockey East men's ice hockey tournament =

2013 Hockey East Men's ice hockey tournament
- Dates: March 14–23, 2013
- Teams: 8
- Finals site: TD Garden; Boston
- Champions: Massachusetts–Lowell (1 title)
- Winning coach: Norm Bazin (1 title)
- MVP: Connor Hellebuyck (UMass Lowell)
- Hockey East Men's Ice Hockey Tournaments

The 2013 Hockey East Men's Ice Hockey Tournament was the 29th tournament in the history of the conference. It was played between March 14 and March 13, 2013 at campus locations and the TD Garden in Boston, Massachusetts. The Massachusetts–Lowell River Hawks won their first Hockey East Tournament and earned the Hockey East's automatic bid into the 2013 NCAA Division I Men's Ice Hockey Tournament.

== Format ==
The tournament featured three rounds of play. The teams that finish below eighth in the conference are not eligible for tournament play. In the first round, the first and eighth seeds, the second and seventh seeds, the third seed and sixth seeds, and the fourth seed and fifth seeds played a best-of-three with the winner advancing to the semifinals. In the semifinals, the highest and lowest seeds and second highest and second lowest seeds play a single-elimination game, with the winner advancing to the championship game. The tournament champion receives an automatic bid to the 2013 NCAA Division I Men's Ice Hockey Tournament.

== Regular season standings ==
Note: GP = Games played; W = Wins; L = Losses; T = Ties; PTS = Points; GF = Goals For; GA = Goals Against

2012–13 Hockey East standings
	Conference record							Overall record					
	GP	W	L	T	PTS	GF	GA	GP	W	L	T	GF	GA
#3 Massachusetts–Lowell † *	27	16	9	2	34	81	63	41	28	11	2	123	83
#9 Boston College	27	15	9	3	33	88	72	38	22	12	4	128	107
#17 Boston University	27	15	10	2	32	82	73	39	21	16	2	120	110
#11 New Hampshire	27	13	8	6	32	81	58	39	20	12	7	122	90
#18 Providence	27	13	8	6	32	75	63	38	17	14	7	105	90
Merrimack	27	13	11	3	29	68	66	38	15	17	6	91	98
Vermont	27	8	13	6	22	60	80	36	11	19	6	82	110
Maine	27	7	12	8	22	57	72	38	11	19	8	77	104
Massachusetts	27	9	16	2	20	72	79	34	12	19	3	93	102
Northeastern	27	5	18	4	14	59	97	34	9	21	4	81	118
Championship: March 23, 2013 † indicates conference regular season champion; * indicates conference tournament champion Rankings: USCHO.com Top 20 Poll

== Bracket ==
Quarterfinals; March 10–13
1	Massachusetts–Lowell	4	2*	—
8	Maine	2	1	—
2	Boston College	4	4	-
7	Vermont	2	1	-
(Pairings are reseeded after the first round)
3	Boston University	3	5	-
6	Merrimack	0	3	-
4	Providence	3	1	3
5	New Hampshire	2	4	2

Semifinals; March 22
1	Massachusetts–Lowell	2
4	Providence	1
2	Boston College	3
3	Boston University	6

Championship; March 23
1	Massachusetts–Lowell	1
3	Boston University	0

Note: * denotes overtime periods

== Results ==
=== Quarterfinals ===
==== (1) Massachusetts–Lowell vs. (8) Maine ====
March 14	Massachusetts–Lowell	4 - 2	Maine	Tsongas Center	Recap
No Scoring		First period	13:52 - PP - Jake Rutt (Shore)
(Arnold, Ruhwedel) Scott Wilson - PP - 17:20		Second period	No scoring
(Folin) Scott Wilson - 01:52 (White) Joseph Pendenza - GW - 02:13 (Ruhwedel, Wetmore) Josh Holmstrom - PP - 06:29		Third period	19:12 - PP EA - Devin Shore (unassisted)
( 24 saves / 26 shots ) Connor Hellebuyck		Goalie stats	Martin Ouellette ( 32 saves / 36 shots )

March 15	Massachusetts–Lowell	2 - 1	OT	Maine	Tsongas Center	Recap
No Scoring		First period		No scoring
No scoring		Second period		07:51 - PP - Devin Shore (Lomberg)
(Wilson) Michael Fallon - 04:00		Third period		No scoring
(Fallon, Folin) Derek Arnold - 01:50		First overtime period		No scoring
( 18 saves / 19 shots ) Connor Hellebuyck		Goalie stats		Martin Ouellette ( 35 saves / 37 shots )

Massachusetts–Lowell wins series 2-0

==== (2) Boston College vs. (7) Vermont ====
March 15	Boston College	4 - 2	Vermont	Conte Forum	Recap
(Doherty, Wey) Brooks Dyroff - 14:47		First period	No scoring
(Mullane) Mike Matheson - PP - 09:13 (Silk) Cam Spiro - GW - 13:04		Second period	No scoring
(Brown) Johnny Gaudreau - EN - 18:58		Third period	04:56 - PP EA - Ben Albertson (Bruneteau, Pattyn); 12:37 - SH - Matt White (unassisted)
( 24 saves / 26 shots ) Parker Milner		Goalie stats	Brody Hoffman ( 23 saves / 26 shots )

March 16	Boston College	4 - 1	Vermont	Conte Forum	Recap
(Mullane, Gaudreau) Steven Whitney - 12:12		First period	No scoring
(MacLeod) Patrick Brown - 01:50		Second period	No scoring
(Arnold, Straight) Johnny Gaudreau - 03:53 (Whitney, Linell) Pat Mullane - 12:45		Third period	13:06 - Matt White (McCarthy)
( 16 saves / 17 shots ) Parker Milner		Goalie stats	Brody Hoffman ( 29 saves / 33 shots )

Boston College wins series 2-0

==== (3) Boston University vs. (6) Merrimack ====
March 15	Boston University	3 - 0	Merrimack	Agganis Arena	Recap
No Scoring		First period	No scoring
(Oksanen, MacGregor) Wade Megan - GW - 06:10 (Rodrigues, Oksanen) Matt Nieto - 16:48		Second period	No scoring
(O'Regan, Nieto) Ryan Santana - PP - 00:55		Third period	No scoring
( 30 saves / 30 shots ) Sean Maguire		Goalie stats	Sam Marotta ( 42 saves / 45 shots )

March 16	Boston University	5 - 3	Merrimack	Agganis Arena	Recap
No Scoring		First period	19:00 - Shawn Bates (Heywood)
(O'Regan, Ruikka) Matt Nieto - 01:31 (Gill, Grzelcyk) Cason Hohmann - PP - 16:12 (Megan, Hohmann) Sam Kurker - PP - 19:52		Second period	04:32 - Mike Collins (Toomey, Heywood); 18:40 - John Gustafsson (unassisted)
(Lane) Ben Rosen - GW - 05:11 (Megan, Oksanen) Sahir Gill - EN - 19:55		Third period	No scoring
( 39 saves / 42 shots ) Sean Maguire		Goalie stats	Sam Marotta ( 29 saves / 33 shots )

Boston University wins series 2-0

==== (4) Providence vs. (5) New Hampshire ====
March 15	Providence	3 - 2	New Hampshire	Schneider Arena	Recap
No Scoring		First period	No scoring
(Luke) Nick Saracino - 02:06 (Luke, Saracino) John Gilmour - 13:27		Second period	13:50 - Grayson Downing (Knodel, Goumas)
(Luke, Mauermann) Nick Saracino - GW - 08:06		Third period	02:00 - Austin Block (Kostolansky, Downing)
( 35 saves / 37 shots ) Jon Gillies		Goalie stats	Casey DeSmith ( 22 saves / 25 shots )

March 16	Providence	1 - 4	New Hampshire	Schneider Arena	Recap
No Scoring		First period	15:19 - Matt Willows (Goumas, Pesce)
(Gilmour, Gillies) Nick Saracino - PP - 03:32		Second period	01:45 - GW - Matt Willows (Goumas, Correale)
No scoring		Third period	17:33 - Jeff Silengo (unassisted); 18:23 - Matt Willows (unassisted)
( 20 saves / 23 shots ) Jon Gillies		Goalie stats	Casey DeSmith ( 38 saves / 39 shots )

March 17	Providence	3 - 2	New Hampshire	Schneider Arena	Recap
(Schaller) Mark Jankowski - 01:31		First period	17:07 - John Henrion (van Riemsdyk, Silengo)
(Hart, Parisi) Tim Schaller - PP - 16:29 (de Jersey, Jankowski) Nick Saracino - GW - 17:13		Second period	10:31 - PP - Grayson Downing (van Riemsdyk, Goumas)
No scoring		Third period	No scoring
( 30 saves / 32 shots ) Jon Gillies		Goalie stats	Casey DeSmith ( 22 saves / 25 shots )

Providence wins series 2-1

=== Semifinals ===
==== (1) Massachusetts–Lowell vs. (4) Providence ====
March 22	Massachusetts–Lowell	2 - 1	Providence	TD Garden	Recap
No Scoring		First period	08:59 - Kevin Rooney (Acciari, C. Rooney)
No scoring		Second period	No scoring
(Pendenza, Ruhwedel) A. J. White - 00:34 (Wetmore) Scott Wilson - GW - 12:30		Third period	No scoring
( 34 saves / 35 shots ) Connor Hellebuyck		Goalie stats	Jon Gillies ( 31 saves / 33 shots )

==== (2) Boston College vs. (3) Boston University ====
March 22	Boston College	3 - 6	Boston University	TD Garden	Recap
(Whitney, Gaudreau) Bill Arnold - PP - 18:33		First period	No scoring
(Mullane, Brown) Quinn Smith - 08:46		Second period	12:17 - Evan Rodrigues (MacGregor); 14:21 - Matt Lane (unassisted); 17:59 - PP - Garrett Noonan (Grzelcyk, Hohmann)
(Mullane) Steven Whitney - 13:43		Third period	01:42 - GW PP - Danny O'Regan (Oksanen, Nieto); 14:21 - PP - Danny O'Regan (Santana, Nieto); 17:31 - SH EN - Evan Rodrigues (unassisted)
( 21 saves / 26 shots ) Parker Milner		Goalie stats	Sean Maguire ( 44 saves / 47 shots )

=== Championship ===
==== (1) Massachusetts–Lowell vs. (3) Boston University ====
March 23	Massachusetts–Lowell	1 - 0	Boston University	TD Garden	Recap
No Scoring		First period	No scoring
No scoring		Second period	No scoring
(Wilson, Ruhwedel) Derek Arnold - GW - 11:09		Third period	No scoring
( 36 saves / 36 shots ) Connor Hellebuyck		Goalie stats	Sean Maguire ( 28 saves / 29 shots )

== Tournament awards ==
=== All-Tournament Team ===
- F Danny O'Regan (Boston University)
- F Evan Rodrigues (Boston University)
- F Scott Wilson (Massachusetts-Lowell)
- D Matt Grzelcyk (Boston University)
- D Chad Ruhwedel (Massachusetts-Lowell)
- G Connor Hellebuyck* (Massachusetts-Lowell)

* Tournament MVP(s)
