= 1988–89 NCAA Division III men's ice hockey season =

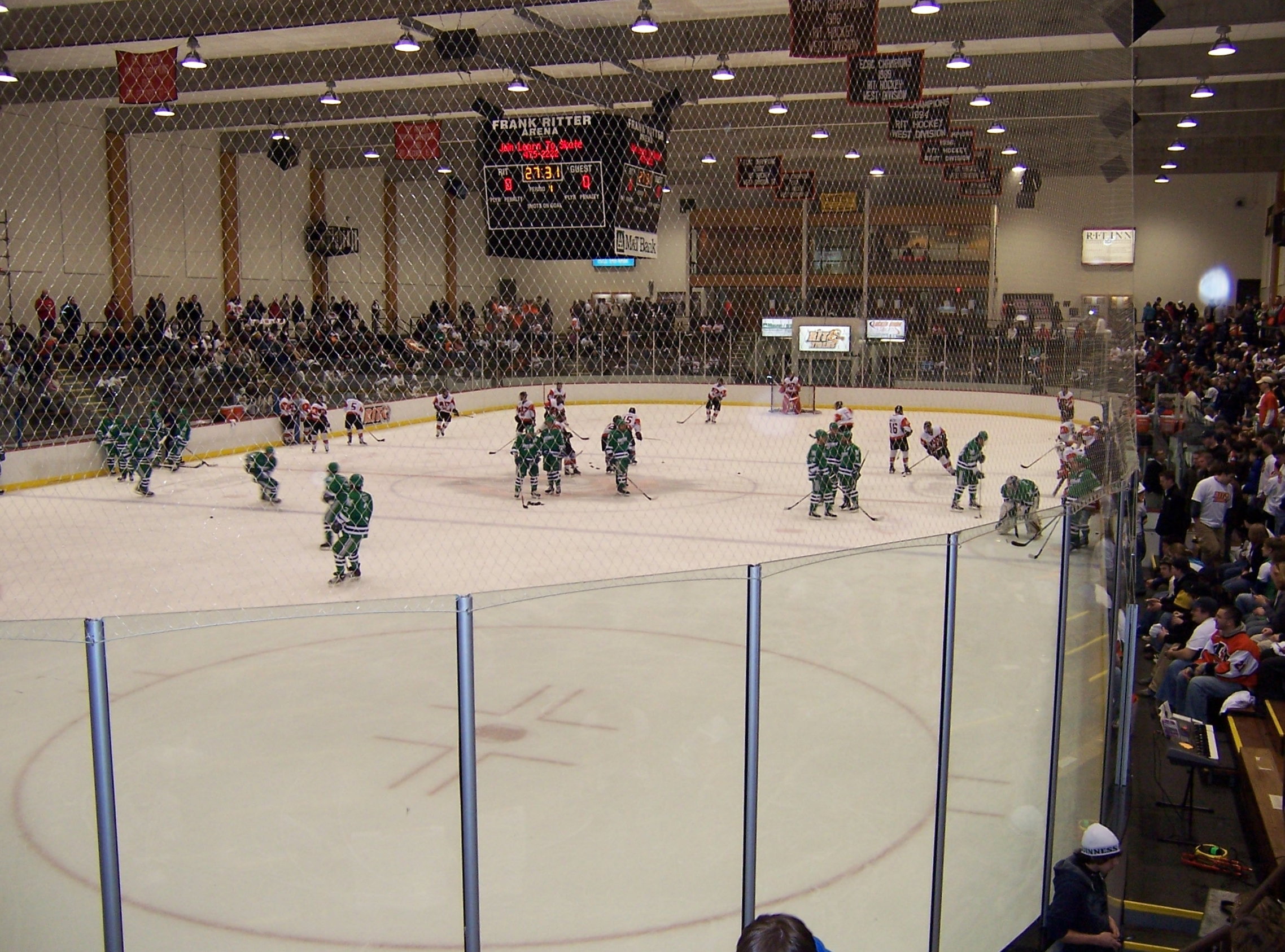
- Frank Ritter Memorial Ice Arena was the host of the 1989 Frozen Four
- Duration: October 1988– March 25, 1989
- NCAA tournament: 1989
- National championship: Frank Ritter Memorial Ice Arena; Rochester, New York
- NCAA champion: Wisconsin–Stevens Point

The 1988–89 NCAA Division III men's ice hockey season began in October 1988 and concluded on March 25 of the following year. This was the 16th season of Division III college ice hockey.

== Regular season ==
=== Season tournaments ===
Tournament	Dates	Teams	Champion
Buffalo State Tournament	October 28–29	4	
Maine Kickoff	October 28–29	4	Maine
Potsdam Tournament	October 28–29	4	Norwich
Brockport Invitational	November 4–5	4	Brock
Cardinal Classic	November 4–5	4	Merrimack
Geneseo Tournament	November 4–5	4	
RIT Tournament	November 4–5	4	RIT
Merrimack Thanksgiving Tournament	November 18–19	4	Merrimack
McCabe Tournament	December 2–3	4	Connecticut College
Codfish Bowl	December 28–29	4	Bowdoin
Salem State Tournament	January 5–6	4	Salem State
East/Midwest Challenge	January 6–7	4	Wisconsin–Superior
Penn State Tournament	January 13–14	4	Mercyhurst
Spurrier Invitational	January 20–21	4	
SUNYAC Tournament	February 17–18	4	Oswego State

=== Standings ===
1988–89 ECAC East standings
	Conference							Overall					
	GP	W	L	T	Pct.	GF	GA	GP	W	L	T	GF	GA
Merrimack †*	16	14	2	0	.875	114	30	34	27	7	0	196	84
Bowdoin †	20	17	2	1	.875	115	62	26	21	4	1		
American International	23	19	4	0	.826	131	72	31	24	7	0		
Babson	25	17	8	0	.680	89	52	30	19	10	1	106	75
Massachusetts–Boston	21	12	8	1	.595	97	74	28	17	10	1	129	100
Salem State	20	11	9	0	.550	102	72	27	15	12	0		
Middlebury	15	7	8	0	.467	64	52	24	11	12	1	106	80
Norwich	20	9	11	0	.450	89	86	24	12	12	0	119	98
Colby	20	7	10	3	.425	64	78	23	9	11	3		
Holy Cross	25	9	16	0	.360	76	127	31	10	21	0	96	163
Saint Anselm	24	8	16	0	.333	76	106	26	8	18	0	81	128
Williams	15	5	10	0	.333	48	65	23	10	13	0		
North Adams State	21	6	14	1	.310	91	104	19	8	10	1		
Connecticut	20	5	15	0	.250	83	112	27	6	21	0	111	142
New England College	19	3	16	0	.158	71	152	23	3	19	1		
Westfield State	11	0	11	0	.000	26	140	21	1	19	1		
Championship: March 5, 1989 † indicates conference regular season champion * indicates conference tournament champion

1988–89 ECAC North/South standings
	Conference							Overall					
	GP	W	L	T	Pct.	GF	GA	GP	W	L	T	GF	GA
North Division
Southeastern Massachusetts †~*	21	18	3	0	.857	140	64	28	24	4	0		
Curry	19	15	3	1	.816	104	51	29	18	9	2		
Saint Michael's	19	15	3	1	.816	106	76	24	16	7	1	118	113
Tufts	19	13	5	1	.711	101	57	23	14	8	1		
Fitchburg State	20	14	6	0	.700	99	58	28	18	10	0	135	90
Suffolk	21	14	6	1	.690	165	103	27	19	7	1		
Plymouth State	19	9	9	1	.500	91	78	21	9	11	1		
Assumption	21	9	11	1	.452	104	112	25	11	12	1		
Nichols	21	7	13	1	.357	82	121	21	7	13	1	82	121
Stonehill	26	8	17	1	.327	112	149	26	8	17	1		
Framingham State	20	4	15	1	.225	69	128	25	5	19	1		
Southern Maine	20	4	16	0	.200	62	102	22	5	17	0	68	112
New Hampshire College	21	3	18	0	.143	63	114	23	3	20	0		
South Division
Iona †~	19	15	4	0	.789	132	79	27	20	7	0		
Connecticut College	17	13	4	0	.765	93	57	23	16	7	0	116	87
Trinity	17	12	5	0	.706	99	55	26	19	7	0	142	83
Western New England	15	10	4	1	.700	95	50	18	11	16	1		
Villanova	16	11	5	0	.688	81	60	23	14	9	0		
Wesleyan	19	12	7	0	.632	101	83	24	13	11	0	119	107
Skidmore	19	12	7	0	.632	103	74	23	15	8	0		
Amherst	16	10	6	0	.625	68	42	28	16	12	0		
Quinnipiac	21	12	9	0	.571	152	119	22	12	10	0	150	117
Roger Williams	24	12	11	1	.521	121	117						
Bentley	22	8	13	1	.386	86	117	23	8	14	1	97	126
Fairfield	21	5	16	0	.238	71	121	26	5	21	0		
St. John's	20	4	16	0	.200	72	143						
Scranton	18	0	18	0	.000			18	0	18	0		
Championship: March 11, 1989 † indicates division regular season champions ~ indicates division tournament champions * indicates conference tournament champion

1988–89 ECAC West standings
	Conference							Overall					
	GP	W	L	T	Pct.	GF	GA	GP	W	L	T	GF	GA
RIT †*	22	19	2	1	.886	156	74	36	26	8	2	222	126
Plattsburgh State ^	26	20	5	1	.788	173	96	26	20	5	1	174	95
Hamilton	23	17	6	0	.739	121	66	25	18	7	0		
Union	23	16	6	1	.717	108	66	29	19	8	2		
Oswego State	26	17	8	1	.673	174	101	29	18	10	1	185	118
Elmira	21	14	7	0	.667	126	75	29	19	10	0	167	118
Canisius	22	13	9	0	.591	115	82	35	15	19	1	148	155
Geneseo State	28	14	13	1	.518	166	127	28	14	13	1		
Cortland State	22	11	11	0	.500	105	102	25	13	12	0		
Hobart	23	10	13	0	.435	117	94	25	12	13	0	131	98
Brockport State	20	8	11	1	.425	99	89	22	9	12	1	112	97
Potsdam State	24	9	15	0	.375	124	127	25	10	15	0		
Mercyhurst	18	5	12	1	.306	81	86	28	11	16	1	148	125
Fredonia State	20	4	15	1	.225	76	108	23	5	17	1		
St. Bonaventure	19	4	15	0	.211	66	151	23	5	18	0		
Binghamton	22	0	22	0	.000	24	287	25	0	25	0		
Championship: March 4, 1989 † indicates conference regular season champion * indicates conference tournament champions^ Plattsburgh State voluntarily ruled themselves ineligible for postseason play while they were under investigation for NCAA rules violations

1988–89 NCAA Division III Independent ice hockey standings
	Overall record					
	GP	W	L	T	GF	GA
Lawrence	12	0	12	0		
St. Norbert	20	8	12	0	93	117

1988–89 Minnesota Intercollegiate Athletic Conference ice hockey standings
	Conference							Overall					
	GP	W	L	T	Pts	GF	GA	GP	W	L	T	GF	GA
St. Thomas †	16	13	3	0	26	73	37	30	18	11	1	138	104
Saint Mary's *	16	11	5	0	22	100	47	31	20	10	1	188	112
Gustavus Adolphus	16	10	6	0	20	78	62	29	13	15	1	130	134
Augsburg	16	8	7	1	17	62	76	28	11	15	2	105	133
St. Olaf	16	7	8	1	15	63	66	26	12	13	1	120	125
Bethel	16	6	8	2	14	47	73	24	8	14	2	77	106
Concordia (MN)	16	6	10	0	12	67	68	21	10	11	0	91	93
Saint John's	16	6	10	0	12	61	72	27	11	16	0	104	134
Hamline	16	3	13	0	6	43	90	25	6	19	0	88	162
Championship: March 4, 1989 † indicates conference regular season champion * indicates conference tournament champion

1988–89 Northern Collegiate Hockey Association standings
	Conference							Overall					
	GP	W	L	T	Pts	GF	GA	GP	W	L	T	GF	GA
Wisconsin–Stevens Point †*	24	23	1	0	46	132	63	41	34	5	2	222	119
Wisconsin–Eau Claire	24	13	8	3	29	129	107	32	15	12	5	169	138
Bemidji State	24	12	10	2	26	102	90	36	19	13	4	166	120
Wisconsin–River Falls	24	11	10	3	25	110	90	28	13	12	3	127	105
Mankato State	24	10	10	4	24	95	89	30	13	13	4	128	117
Wisconsin–Superior	24	7	17	0	14	85	108	30	11	19	0	133	132
St. Scholastica	24	1	22	1	3	66	164	28	3	24	1	92	186
Championship: March 4, 1989 † indicates conference regular season champion * indicates conference tournament champion

Note: Mini-game are not included in final standings

== 1989 NCAA Tournament ==
Quarterfinals; March 10–12
Oswego State	7	2	1
RIT	5	5	4
Babson	1	3	-
Union	1	2	-
Wisconsin–Stevens Point	5	5	-
Wisconsin–Eau Claire	2	3	-
Bemidji State	5	7	-
Saint Mary's	4	2	-

Semifinals; March 17–18
RIT	6	7	-
Babson	2	5	-
Wisconsin–Stevens Point	11	6	-
Bemidji State	0	3	-

National Championship; March 24–25
RIT	3	2	-
Wisconsin–Stevens Point	3	3	-

Note: * denotes overtime period(s)

== Drafted players ==
Round	Pick	Player	College	Conference	NHL team
8	168	Kevin Wortman	American International	ECAC East	Calgary Flames
12	237	Mike Doneghey ^{†}	Merrimack	ECAC East	Chicago Blackhawks

† incoming freshman

== 1989 NHL supplemental draft ==
Round	Pick	Player	College	Conference	NHL team
2	7	Brad Mattson	Saint Mary's	MIAC	New York Islanders

== See also ==
- 1988–89 NCAA Division I men's ice hockey season
