= Jim Hunt (ice hockey) =

American ice hockey coach

Biographical details
- Born: Fort Lee, NJ, USA
- Education: Saint Mary's

Coaching career (HC unless noted)
- 1985–1987: Saint Mary's (Assistant)
- 1987–1995: Paramus Catholic High School
- 1992–1997: New Jersey Junior Devils (HC/GM)
- 1997–2000: US NTDP (Assistant)
- 2000–2003: Fairfield
- 2004–2007: New Jersey Hitmen (HC/GM)
- 2006–Present: New Jersey Hitmen (President)
- 2009–2012: USA Hockey (Regional Manager)
- 2016–Present: USPHL (Deputy Commissioner)

Head coaching record
- Overall: 25-65-7 (.294) (college)

Jim Hunt is an American ice hockey former head coach and current president of the New Jersey Hitmen.

== Career ==
Hunt got his coaching start as an undergrad while at Saint Mary's. After graduating with a degree in criminal justice and psychology in 1987 he returned home to New Jersey to take over as head coach for the Paramus Catholic High School ice hockey team, working there until 1995. towards the end of his tenure with Paramus Hunt also served as head coach and general manager for the New Jersey Junior Devils of the Metropolitan Junior Hockey League. He worked in that dual capacity until 1997 when he was hired as an assistant coach and assistant director of player personnel for the recently created US NTDP.

In 2000, after having four coaches in five years, Fairfield turned to Hunt to stabilize its young Division I program that had gone 4-59-3 the previous two campaigns. In his first season the Stags almost quadrupled their win total, going 11-19-2 and finishing tied for seventh in the conference. The team regressed the next year, recording only six wins, but modest improvements saw an 8-win third season. With the team mired at the bottom of the standings the program was terminated as part of a cost-cutting measure by the university that also claimed the football program.

With his time in Fairfield over Hunt once again returned to New Jersey, this time joining the newly formed New Jersey Hitmen. He worked as head coach and general manager for three years and was named as team president in 2006. While remaining with the club Hunt has also served as a regional manager for USA Hockey's American Development Model and was named as a deputy commissioner for the USPHL's youth divisions that are set to begin play in the 2016-17 season.

Hunt was a police officer for 25 years, retiring as a detective for the Fort Lee Police Department.

== Head coaching record ==
=== College ===
Record table
Season	Team	Overall	Conference	Standing	Postseason
Fairfield Stags (MAAC) (2000–2003)
2000–01	Fairfield	11-19-2	10-14-2	t-7th	MAAC Quarterfinals
2001–02	Fairfield	6-23-3	4-19-3	10th	
2002–03	Fairfield	8-23-2	7-17-2	11th	
Fairfield:		25-65-7	21-50-7		
Total:		25-65-7			
National champion Postseason invitational champion Conference regular season champion Conference regular season and conference tournament champion Division regular season champion Division regular season and conference tournament champion Conference tournament champion
