= Mark Dennehy =

American ice hockey head coach (b.1967)

Biographical details
- Born: October 18, 1967 (age 59); Dorchester, Massachusetts, U.S.

Playing career
- 1987–1991: Boston College
- 1991–1992: Ayr Raiders
- Position: Defenceman

Coaching career (HC unless noted)
- 1994–1999: Princeton (Assistant)
- 1999–2000: Fairfield
- 2000–2005: Massachusetts (Assistant)
- 2005–2018: Merrimack
- 2018–2021: Binghamton Devils

Head coaching record
- Overall: 171–278–62 (.395) [college]

Accomplishments and honors

Awards
- 2010 Bob Kullen Coach of the Year Award; 2× Clark Hodder coach of the year (2010, 2011)

Mark Dennehy (born October 18, 1967) is an American ice hockey head coach who most recently led the former Binghamton Devils of the American Hockey League.

== Career ==
Dennehy debuted for the Boston College Eagles in the fall of 1987, playing four years with the team that included three first place finishes, three NCAA tournament appearances and a Frozen Four appearance in 1990. After graduating, he played for the Ayr Raiders of the now-defunct British Hockey League in their final season of existence, finishing third in scoring for his team. Dennehy earned a tryout with the IHL's Fort Wayne Komets the following season but retired from playing soon thereafter.

After nearly a year away from hockey, Dennehy returned to his home state and was brought on by his former BC assistant coach Joe Mallen to help out with team practices for Massachusetts. Dennehy then became a full time coach, joining the staff at Princeton under Don Cahoon. After five years with the Tigers, which saw the program's first ever NCAA tournament appearance in 1998, Dennehy became the head coach for Fairfield. Dennehy took over the program after it posted one of the worst records in NCAA history the year prior of 1–31. His first season was only slightly better with only three wins in the 1999–00 season. After the poor season, Dennehy resigned and rejoined Cahoon as an assistant, this time with the Massachusetts Minutemen. He remained as an assistant for an additional five seasons before starting his second stint as a head coach with Merrimack.

Prior to Dennehy arriving at Merrimack, the Warriors had not had a winning season since they had joined Hockey East in 1989. Then at the time Merrimack president Richard Santagati was even publicly questioning the teams viability as a hockey east program. His first two seasons saw little success, including a school-worst three-win campaign in his second year. This was just half of Dennehy’s struggles though. As behind scenes there were even more problems. As the school named a new president and they were barely putting any money into the program. Dennehy would take matters into his own hands though as he fought vigorously for his program. On top of recruiting and building a roster. He had numerous meetings with administration trying to convince them why Hockey east and Division I were best for the program. His hard work would ultimately pay off as the school would stay in hockey east and stuck with him and allowed Dennehy to slowly build the program. By year five, the Warriors had seen significant improvements raising to 16-wins, their best record since 1994. Dennehy was honored as the 2010 Bob Kullen Coach of the Year, the first Merrimack coach to receive the award. He would also be named Clark Hodder Coach of the year. The following season Dennehy would lead the program to their best season at the D1 level. As they posted 25 wins and recorded their first winning season in over 20 years. The team reached the Hockey East tournament final for the first time and made only their second NCAA tournament appearance. They would lose a heart breaker to Notre Dame 4-3 in overtime in the first round. Dennehy would once again be named Clark Hodder coach of the year for the second year in a row. After another winning season in 2011–12 and narrowly missing the NCAA tournament. Merrimack returned to sub-.500 records. Dennehy was fired by Merrimack following the 2017–18 season.

He was hired as the head coach of the Wheeling Nailers in the ECHL on May 29, 2018. However, prior to coaching a game for the Nailers, he took the head coaching position with the American Hockey League's Binghamton Devils. In August, 2021, he was promoted by the Devils to become their Chief Scout of Amateur Scouting, which remains his current position with the organization. Under his leadership, in July, 2022, New Jersey selected Slovakian defenseman Simon Nemec with the 2nd overall pick in the NHL amateur draft in Montreal.

== Personal life ==
Dennehy is married to his wife Heather they have 3 daughters together Kelsey, Kielan, and Caroline.

In October 2025 Dennehy alongside his daughter Kelsey, started a podcast about youth sports the two started the podcast to help build a comprehensive platform to guide families through the “complex terrain” of modern youth sports, and highlight positive stories about coaches and leaders.

== Head coaching record ==
=== College ===
Record table
Season	Team	Overall	Conference	Standing	Postseason
Fairfield Stags (MAAC) (1999–2000)
1999–00	Fairfield	3–28–3	3–22–2	10th	
Fairfield:		3–28–3	3–22–2		
Merrimack Warriors (Hockey East) (2005–2018)
2005–06	Merrimack	6–23–5	3–19–5	10th	
2006–07	Merrimack	3–27–4	3–22–2	10th	
2007–08	Merrimack	12–18–4	6–18–3	10th	
2008–09	Merrimack	9–21–4	5–19–3	t-9th	
2009–10	Merrimack	16–19–2	12–13–2	t-6th	Hockey East Quarterfinals
2010–11	Merrimack	25–10–4	16–8–3	4th	NCAA Northeast Regional semifinals
2011–12	Merrimack	18–12–7	13–9–5	5th	Hockey East Quarterfinals
2012–13	Merrimack	15–17–6	13–11–3	6th	Hockey East Quarterfinals
2013–14	Merrimack	8–22–3	3–15–2	11th	Hockey East Opening Round
2014–15	Merrimack	16–18–4	5–14–3	11th	Hockey East Quarterfinals
2015–16	Merrimack	13–19–7	5–10–7	7th	Hockey East Quarterfinals
2016–17	Merrimack	15–16–6	8–8–6	7th	Hockey East Opening Round
2017–18	Merrimack	12–21–4	7–15–2	10th	Hockey East Quarterfinals
Merrimack:		168–243–60	99–166–44		
Total:		171–278–62			
National champion Postseason invitational champion Conference regular season champion Conference regular season and conference tournament champion Division regular season champion Division regular season and conference tournament champion Conference tournament champion

Awards and achievements
Preceded by Greg Cronin	Bob Kullen Coach of the Year Award; 2009–10 (With Dick Umile)	Succeeded by Jerry York
