= Dallas Eakins =

American ice hockey player and coach

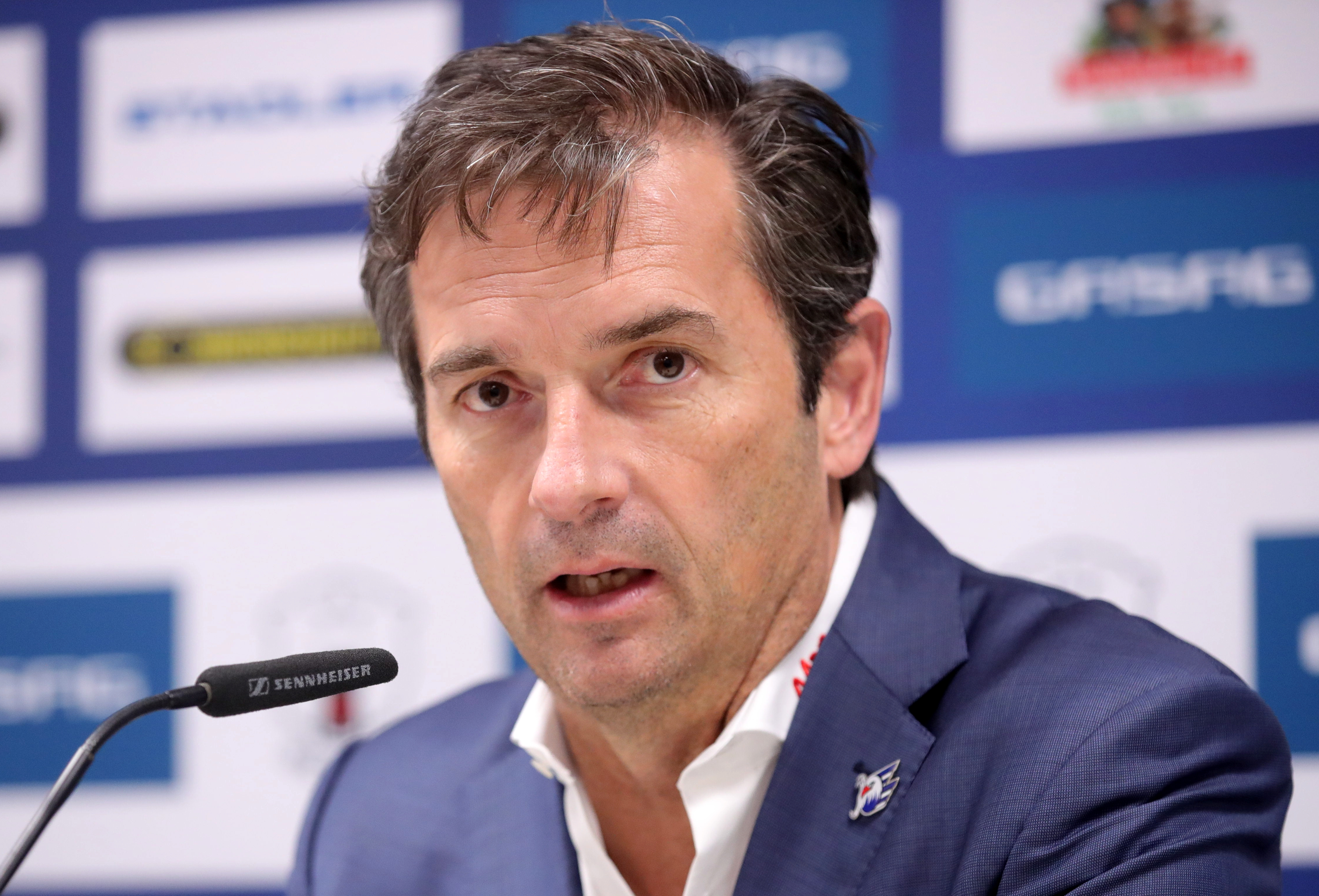
- Eakins in 2023
- Born: January 20, 1967 (age 59) Dade City, Florida, U.S.
- Height: 6 ft 2 in (188 cm)
- Weight: 195 lb (88 kg; 13 st 13 lb)
- Position: Defence
- Shot: Left
- Played for: Winnipeg Jets; Florida Panthers; St. Louis Blues; Phoenix Coyotes; New York Rangers; Toronto Maple Leafs; New York Islanders; Calgary Flames
- Current coach: Adler Mannheim
- Coached for: Edmonton Oilers; Anaheim Ducks
- NHL draft: 208th overall, 1985; Washington Capitals
- Playing career: 1988–2004
- Coaching career: 2005–present

Dallas Franklin Eakins (né Yoder; January 20, 1967) is an American professional ice hockey coach and former player. He previously served as the head coach of the Edmonton Oilers and Anaheim Ducks of the National Hockey League (NHL). He currently serves as head coach and general manager of the Adler Mannheim of the German Deutsche Eishockey Liga.

== Early years ==
Eakins' mother, Carol Ploof, was a native of Macon, Georgia. His birth father was a Native American, Ted Yoder, who Eakins believes was Cherokee. Both parents split up shortly after his birth. Ploof later married Jim Eakins, a Canadian long-distance truck driver, and Dallas subsequently adopted his stepfather's last name.

In October 1974, Eakins' family relocated to Peterborough, Ontario. As a youth, he played in the 1980 Quebec International Pee-Wee Hockey Tournament with a minor ice hockey team from Peterborough.

== Playing career ==
Eakins played 4 seasons in the Ontario Hockey League (OHL) for the Peterborough Petes, being named the captain in his final year and also the team's best defenseman that season. Jeff Twohey who was with the Petes for 3 decades called him the best captain the team ever had, saying "He was a great leader. He was a hard worker, loyal, tough, and never afraid to confront people. He knew how to keep players in line."

Eakins was drafted 208th overall by the Washington Capitals in the 1985 NHL entry draft. He went on to play 120 career NHL games, scoring no goals and 9 assists for 9 points, thus becoming the second Floridian to play in the NHL, and the first to ever record a point. Eakins is the first player born in the state of Florida to play for the Florida Panthers, having played for the club on two separate stints (but was raised primarily in Canada). However, the majority of Eakins' career was played in the American Hockey League (AHL) and the International Hockey League (IHL). In those two leagues, Eakins played 882 games, scoring 43 goals and 179 assists for 222 points, whilst playing for 10 different teams. Eakins also won a Calder Cup and a Turner Cup as a member of the Chicago Wolves.

Eakins once made a bet with Cincinnati radio personality Dennis "Wildman" Walker of WEBN while a member of the Cincinnati Cyclones that he would not score more than 3 goals in one season. Walker stated that Eakins could shave his head at center ice of the Cincinnati Gardens if he eclipsed that mark. Eakins not only scored six goals but did it in 30 games. The head shaving took place at center ice, before a game in December 1994, against the Long Beach Ice Dogs.

While serving as the captain of the Manitoba Moose in the 2003–04, Eakins switched from his number 6 to number 37, in honor of his friend and former Wolves teammate, Dan Snyder, who was killed in a car accident in Atlanta, Georgia. Snyder was a member of the Atlanta Thrashers.

== Coaching career ==
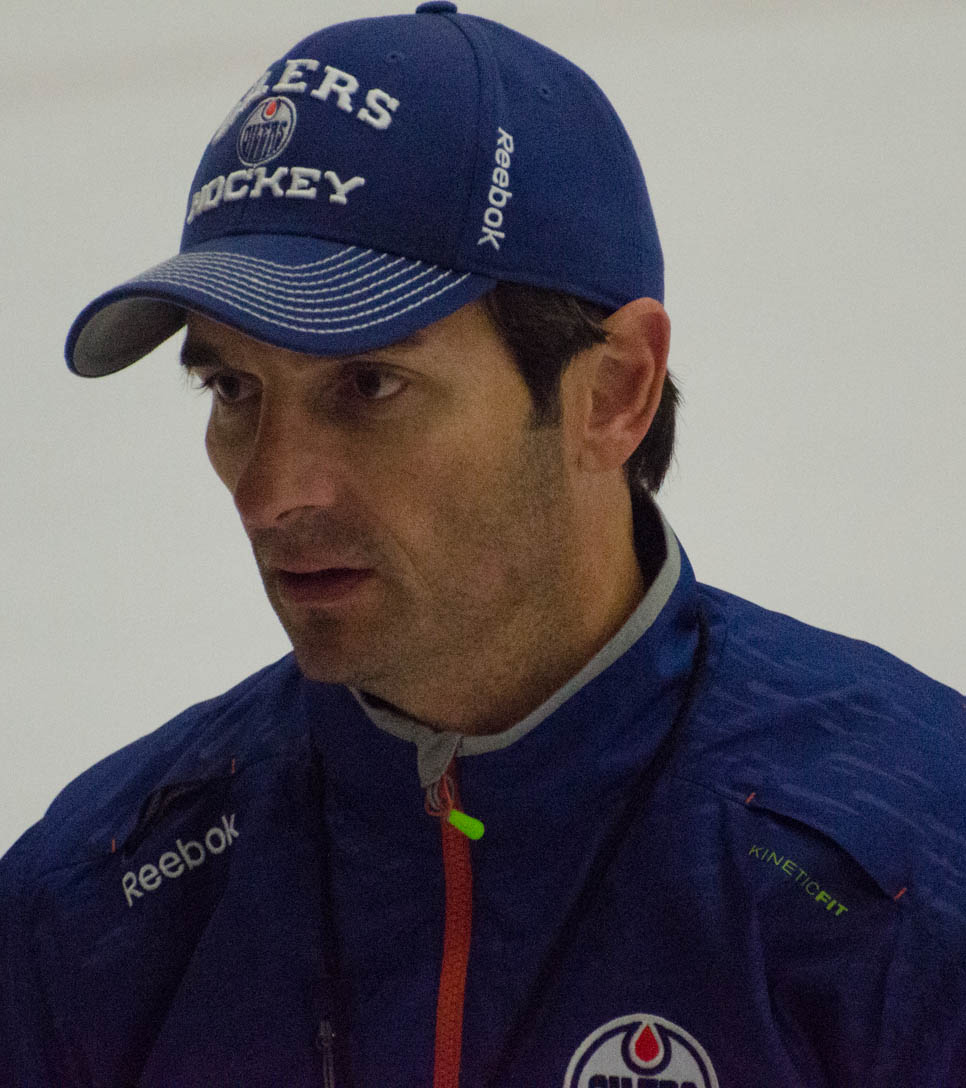
Eakins coaching the Edmonton Oilers in 2014

After retiring as a player, Eakins joined the Toronto Maple Leafs organization as an assistant coach for the Toronto Marlies and later the Maple Leafs in 2006. In 2009, he was given head coaching duties for the Marlies. While with the Marlies, Eakins was named as one of two head coaches representing the Western Conference for the 2011–2012 and 2012–2013 seasons AHL All-Star games.

Eakins left the Marlies in the summer of 2013 to become the head coach of the Edmonton Oilers, but was fired from his position after only 18 months on December 15, 2014. In June 2015, the Anaheim Ducks hired Eakins as the head coach of their AHL-affiliate, the San Diego Gulls.

On June 17, 2019, the Anaheim Ducks named Eakins as the franchise's 10th head coach. On April 14, 2023, the Ducks announced Eakins' contract would not be renewed, ending his four-year tenure as head coach.

On November 27, 2023, Eakins was announced as the new head coach and general manager of a struggling Adler Mannheim in the German DEL, after a mid-season dismissal of general manager Jan-Axel Alavaara and head coach Johan Lundskog.

== Personal life ==
Eakins is married to actress Ingrid Kavelaars. They have two daughters together. His career is profiled in the book Journeymen: 24 Bittersweet Tales of Short Major League Sports Careers by Kurt Dusterberg.

== Career statistics ==
			Regular season					Playoffs
Season	Team	League	GP	G	A	Pts	PIM	GP	G	A	Pts	PIM
1983–84	Peterborough Travelways	OMHA	29	7	20	27	67	—	—	—	—	—
1983–84	Peterborough Legionnaires	OMHA	5	0	3	3	4	—	—	—	—	—
1984–85	Peterborough Petes	OHL	48	0	8	8	96	7	0	0	0	18
1985–86	Peterborough Petes	OHL	60	6	16	22	134	16	0	1	1	30
1986–87	Peterborough Petes	OHL	54	3	11	14	145	12	1	4	5	37
1987–88	Peterborough Petes	OHL	64	11	27	38	129	12	3	12	15	16
1988–89	Baltimore Skipjacks	AHL	62	0	10	10	139	—	—	—	—	—
1989–90	Moncton Hawks	AHL	75	2	11	13	189	—	—	—	—	—
1990–91	Moncton Hawks	AHL	75	1	12	13	132	9	0	1	1	44
1991–92	Moncton Hawks	AHL	67	3	13	16	136	11	2	1	3	16
1992–93	Winnipeg Jets	NHL	14	0	2	2	38	—	—	—	—	—
1992–93	Moncton Hawks	AHL	55	4	6	10	132	—	—	—	—	—
1993–94	Florida Panthers	NHL	1	0	0	0	0	—	—	—	—	—
1993–94	Cincinnati Cyclones	IHL	80	1	18	19	143	8	0	1	1	41
1994–95	Cincinnati Cyclones	IHL	59	6	12	18	69	—	—	—	—	—
1994–95	Florida Panthers	NHL	17	0	1	1	35	—	—	—	—	—
1995–96	St. Louis Blues	NHL	16	0	1	1	34	—	—	—	—	—
1995–96	Worcester IceCats	AHL	4	0	0	0	12	—	—	—	—	—
1995–96	Winnipeg Jets	NHL	2	0	0	0	0	—	—	—	—	—
1996–97	Phoenix Coyotes	NHL	4	0	0	0	10	—	—	—	—	—
1996–97	Springfield Falcons	AHL	38	6	7	13	63	—	—	—	—	—
1996–97	New York Rangers	NHL	3	0	0	0	6	4	0	0	0	4
1996–97	Binghamton Rangers	AHL	19	1	7	8	15	—	—	—	—	—
1997–98	Florida Panthers	NHL	23	0	1	1	44	—	—	—	—	—
1997–98	Beast of New Haven	AHL	4	0	1	1	7	—	—	—	—	—
1998–99	Toronto Maple Leafs	NHL	18	0	2	2	24	1	0	0	0	0
1998–99	St. John's Maple Leafs	AHL	20	3	7	10	16	5	0	1	1	6
1998–99	Chicago Wolves	IHL	2	0	0	0	0	—	—	—	—	—
1999–2000	New York Islanders	NHL	2	0	1	1	2	—	—	—	—	—
1999–2000	Chicago Wolves	IHL	68	5	26	31	99	16	1	4	5	16
2000–01	Calgary Flames	NHL	17	0	1	1	11	—	—	—	—	—
2000–01	Chicago Wolves	IHL	64	3	16	19	49	14	0	0	0	24
2001–02	Calgary Flames	NHL	3	0	0	0	4	—	—	—	—	—
2001–02	Chicago Wolves	AHL	54	2	15	17	58	25	0	6	6	53
2002–03	Chicago Wolves	AHL	72	4	11	15	84	9	1	0	1	31
2003–04	Manitoba Moose	AHL	64	1	7	8	68	—	—	—	—	—
AHL totals			609	27	107	134	1051	59	3	9	12	150
NHL totals			120	0	9	9	208	5	0	0	0	4
IHL totals			273	15	72	87	360	38	1	5	6	81

== Head coaching record ==
=== NHL ===
Team	Year	Regular season						Postseason			
Team	Year	G	W	L	OTL	Pts	Finish	W	L	Win %	Result
EDM	2013–14	82	29	44	9	67	7th in Pacific	—	—	—	Missed playoffs
EDM	2014–15	31	7	19	5	19	(fired)	—	—	—	—
EDM total		113	36	63	14			—	—	—	
ANA	2019–20	71*	29	33	9	67	6th in Pacific	—	—	—	Missed playoffs
ANA	2020–21	56*	17	30	9	43	8th in West	—	—	—	Missed playoffs
ANA	2021–22	82	31	37	14	76	7th in Pacific	—	—	—	Missed playoffs
ANA	2022–23	82	23	47	12	58	8th in Pacific	—	—	—	Missed playoffs
ANA total		291	100	147	44			—	—	—	
Total		404	137	210	58			—	—	—	

* Shortened seasons due to the COVID-19 pandemic during the 2019–20 and 2020–21 seasons

=== AHL ===
Team	Year	Regular season						Postseason			
Team	Year	G	W	L	OTL	Pts	Finish	W	L	Win %	Result
TOR	2009–10	80	33	35	12	78	5th in North	—	—	—	Missed playoffs
TOR	2010–11	80	37	32	11	85	5th in North	—	—	—	Missed playoffs
TOR	2011–12	76	44	24	8	96	1st in North	11	6	.647	Lost in Calder Cup Final
TOR	2012–13	76	43	23	10	96	1st in North	5	4	.556	Lost in Conference Semifinals
SDG	2015–16	68	39	23	6	84	2nd in Pacific	4	5	.444	Lost in Division Finals
SDG	2016–17	68	43	20	5	91	2nd in Pacific	4	6	.400	Lost in Division Finals
SDG	2017–18	68	36	28	4	76	5th in Pacific	—	—	—	Missed playoffs
SDG	2018–19	68	36	24	8	80	3rd in Pacific	9	7	.563	Lost in Conference Finals
Total		584	311	209	64		2 division titles	33	28	.541	5 playoff appearances

Preceded by Ralph Krueger	Head coach of the Edmonton Oilers; 2013–2014	Succeeded by Todd Nelson (interim)
Preceded by Bob Murray; Interim	Head coach of the Anaheim Ducks; 2019–2023	Succeeded by Greg Cronin
