= Randy Carlyle =

Canadian ice hockey player and coach

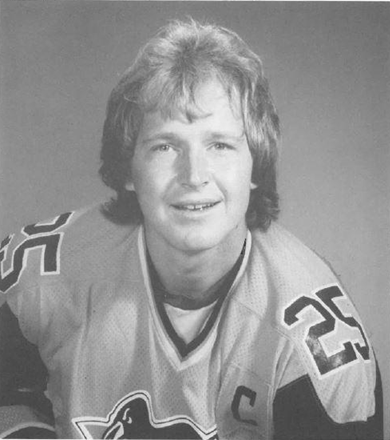
- Carlyle with the Pittsburgh Penguins in 1983
- Born: April 19, 1956 (age 70) Azilda, Ontario, Canada
- Height: 5 ft 10 in (178 cm)
- Weight: 200 lb (91 kg; 14 st 4 lb)
- Position: Defence
- Shot: Left
- Played for: Toronto Maple Leafs; Pittsburgh Penguins; Winnipeg Jets
- Coached for: Anaheim Ducks; Toronto Maple Leafs
- National team: Canada
- NHL draft: 30th overall, 1976; Toronto Maple Leafs
- WHA draft: 7th overall, 1976; Cincinnati Stingers
- Playing career: 1976–1993
- Coaching career: 1993–2019
Medal record
Men's ice hockey
Representing Canada
World Championship
Silver medal – second place	1989 Sweden	Ice hockey

Randolph Robert Carlyle (born April 19, 1956) is a Canadian professional ice hockey coach and former player. He is the former head coach of the National Hockey League (NHL)'s Toronto Maple Leafs and the Mighty Ducks of Anaheim / Anaheim Ducks. As a player, Carlyle dressed for over 1,000 games between the Maple Leafs, Pittsburgh Penguins and Winnipeg Jets. As a defenseman, he won the James Norris Memorial Trophy in the 1980–81 season and served as a captain of both the Penguins and Jets.

After his playing days ended, Carlyle worked for the Jets, rising to assistant coach in 1995. After the team moved to Phoenix the following year, he stayed in Winnipeg to serve as assistant coach with the Manitoba Moose of the International Hockey League. He was promoted to head coach in the middle of the 1996 season and ultimately served as head coach in two separate stints (1996–2002, 2004–2005). He became an assistant coach with NHL again with the Washington Capitals, where he served from 2002 to 2004. He was hired as head coach of the Mighty Ducks of Anaheim in 2005. In his first tenure with the team of seven seasons, the team won the Stanley Cup once in 2007. He was fired by the Ducks early in the 2011–12 season and was later hired to serve as interim coach of the Toronto Maple Leafs that same year. He coached three more seasons with the team from 2012 to 2015 and made the playoffs once before being fired in 2015. In 2016, he was hired to coach the Ducks again, where he led them to the Conference Finals in his first season and a playoff appearance the following year before being let go midway through the 2018–19 season. In fourteen seasons as a head coach, Carlyle won the Stanley Cup once and reached the playoffs eight times.

Carlyle is partially of Finnish descent, and was raised in Azilda, just northwest of Sudbury, Ontario.

== Junior career ==
=== Sudbury Wolves (1973–1976) ===
Carlyle appeared in 12 games with the Sudbury Wolves in the 1973–74 OHA season, earning eight assists. He played in four playoff games with Sudbury, going pointless, as the Wolves were swept by the Kitchener Rangers in the first round.

Carlyle became a regular on the Wolves' blueline in 1974–75, as he scored 17 goals and 64 points in 67 games to finish tied with Dave Farrish in points among defencemen on the Wolves. In the playoffs, Carlyle scored 3 goals and 9 points in 15 games as Sudbury were eliminated by the Toronto Marlboros in the second round.

Carlyle continued to improve offensively: during the 1975–76 season, he scored 15 goals and 79 points in 60 games to lead the Wolves defence, and finish fourth in team scoring. Carlyle also had an impressive playoff, scoring 6 goals and 19 points in 17 games as the Wolves were eliminated by the Hamilton Fincups in the final round.

He later had his #6 jersey retired by the Wolves.

== Professional career ==
=== Toronto Maple Leafs (1976–1978) ===
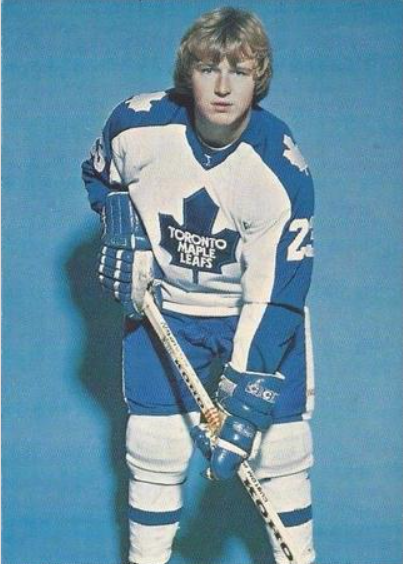
Carlyle with the Toronto Maple Leafs in 1977

Carlyle was drafted into the National Hockey League (NHL) by the Toronto Maple Leafs in the second round, 30th overall, of the 1976 NHL entry draft, on June 1, 1976. In his first professional season, 1976–77, he spent the majority of the year with the Maple Leafs in the NHL, scoring 5 assists in 45 games in his rookie season. In nine Stanley Cup playoff games with the Leafs, Carlyle had one assist as the Maple Leafs were eliminated by the Philadelphia Flyers in the quarter-finals. Carlyle had also spent some time of the 1976–77 season with the Dallas Black Hawks of the Central Hockey League (CHL), scoring 2 goals and 9 points in 27 games with the club.

Carlyle split the 1977–78 season between the Dallas Black Hawks and the Toronto Maple Leafs. In 21 games with Dallas, he scored 3 goals and 17 points. With Toronto, he scored 2 goals and 13 points in 47 games, helping the Leafs into the 1978 playoffs. In seven playoff games, he recorded one assist as the Maple Leafs were eliminated by the Montreal Canadiens in the semi-finals.

On June 14, 1978, Carlyle (alongside George Ferguson) was traded to the Pittsburgh Penguins in exchange for Dave Burrows.

=== Pittsburgh Penguins (1978–1984) ===
Carlyle joined the Penguins for the 1978–79 season, where in 70 games he had significant improvement offensively, scoring 13 goals and 47 points to lead all Penguins defencemen in scoring. However, in seven playoff games, Carlyle went pointless as the Penguins were eliminated by the Boston Bruins in the quarter-finals.

Carlyle saw his offensive production slip in the 1979–80 season, when he scored 8 goals and 36 points in 67 games, although he still led the Penguins defence in scoring. In five playoff games, Carlyle scored one goal as the Penguins were again eliminated by Boston, this time in the preliminary round.

Carlyle had the best season of his career in the 1980–81 season: in 76 games, he scored 16 goals and 83 points to lead all NHL defencemen in scoring. In the 1981 playoffs, Carlyle scored four goals and nine points in five games as the Penguins were eliminated by the St. Louis Blues in the preliminary round. After the season, Carlyle was awarded the James Norris Memorial Trophy for the NHL's best defenceman in the regular season; he was also named to the NHL First All-Star Team and finished 11th in Hart Memorial Trophy voting as the NHL's most valuable player during the regular season.

Carlyle had another very successful season in 1981–82, when he scored 11 goals and 75 points in 73 games, helping Pittsburgh into the 1982 playoffs. In five playoff games, he scored a goal and four points, as the Penguins were eliminated by the New York Islanders in the Patrick Division semi-finals.

Carlyle ran into injuries in the 1982–83 season, as he appeared in only 61 games. However, his offensive production remained impressive, as he scored 15 goals and 56 points to lead the Penguins blue line. The Penguins struggled during the season, and missed the playoffs.

Carlyle struggled in the 1983–84 season, scoring only 3 goals and 26 points in 50 games, his lowest totals since joining the club in 1978. With the Penguins rebuilding, on March 5, Carlyle was traded to the Winnipeg Jets in exchange for the Jets' first-round draft pick in the 1984 NHL entry draft (which the Penguins used to select Doug Bodger) and future considerations, which was completed on May 1 when the Jets sent Moe Mantha to the Penguins.

=== Winnipeg Jets (1984–1993) ===
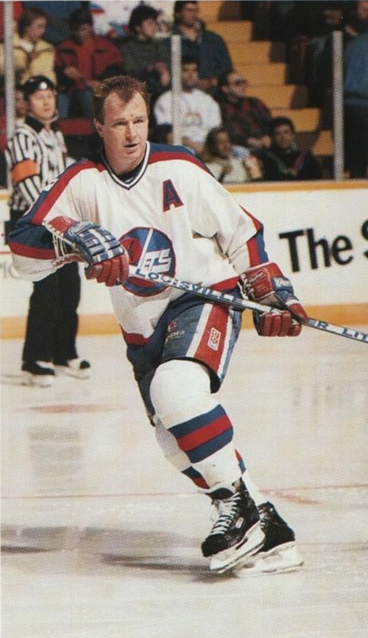
Carlyle with the Winnipeg Jets in 1988

Carlyle finished the 1983–84 season with the Jets. However, due to injuries, he appeared in only five games with the club, earning three assists. In three 1984 playoff games, Carlyle recorded two assists as the Jets were swept by the Edmonton Oilers in the Smythe Division semi-final.

In his first full season with the Jets, in 1984–85, Carlyle's offensive production went up, as he scored 13 goals and 51 points in 71 games. In eight playoff games, Carlyle had one goal and six points as the Jets were eliminated by Edmonton in the division final. After the season, Carlyle finished seventh in voting for the Norris Trophy.

In the 1985–86 season, Carlyle tied his career-high with 16 goals, matching his total from 1980 to 1981, and added 33 assists for 49 points in 68 games to lead the Jets defence in scoring. However, due to a late season injury, Carlyle did not appear in any playoff games, as the Jets were swept by the Calgary Flames in the division semi-final.

Carlyle once again tied his career-high in goals with 16 in 1986–87, as well as added 26 assists for 42 points in 71 games, helping the team reach the 1987 playoffs. In ten playoff games, he scored one goal and six points as Winnipeg would lose to Edmonton in the division final.

Carlyle had his best season as a Jet in 1987–88, as he scored 15 goals and 59 points in 78 games for his highest point total in a season since 1981–82. Carlyle also set a career-high with 210 penalty minutes, and would be the only season of his Jets career that he would have over 100 penalty minutes. In the 1988 playoffs, Carlyle had two assists in five games as the Jets were again eliminated by Edmonton Oilers, this time in five games in the division semi-final.

In the 1988–89 season, Carlyle struggled offensively, scoring only six goals, his lowest total since 1983–84, and 44 points in 78 games. The Jets failed to qualify for the playoffs for the first time since Carlyle joined the team.

Injuries plagued Carlyle in the 1989–90 season, as in 53 games, he scored 3 goals and 18 points, his lowest point total since his 1977–78 season with Toronto. Carlyle did not appear in any playoff games as Winnipeg were eliminated by the Edmonton Oilers in seven games in the division semi-final.

Injuries limited Carlyle to only 52 games in the 1990–91 season, as he scored 9 goals and 28 points. The struggling Jets missed the playoffs for the second time in three seasons.

Carlyle's offense struggled greatly in the 1991–92 season, as in 66 games, he scored 1 goal and 10 points, his lowest totals since his rookie season in 1976–77. The Jets made the 1992 playoffs, and in five games, Carlyle scored one goal as the Jets were eliminated by the Vancouver Canucks in the division semi-final.

Carlyle saw limited action with the Jets in the 1992–93 season, playing in 22 games, scoring 1 goal and 2 points. On March 6, 1993, Carlyle played his final NHL game, scoring a goal against Félix Potvin of the Toronto Maple Leafs in a 4–2 Jets loss. He retired as a player on August 25, 1993. He was one of the last players in the league to not wear a helmet.

He was inducted into the Winnipeg Jets Hall of Fame in 2020.

== Career statistics ==
=== Regular season and playoffs ===
			Regular season					Playoffs
Season	Team	League	GP	G	A	Pts	PIM	GP	G	A	Pts	PIM
1973–74	Sudbury Wolves	OHA-Jr.	12	0	8	8	21	4	0	0	0	6
1974–75	Sudbury Wolves	OMJHL	67	17	47	64	118	15	3	6	9	21
1975–76	Sudbury Wolves	OMJHL	60	15	64	79	126	17	6	13	19	70
1976–77	Toronto Maple Leafs	NHL	45	0	5	5	51	9	0	1	1	20
1976–77	Dallas Black Hawks	CHL	26	2	7	9	63	—	—	—	—	—
1977–78	Toronto Maple Leafs	NHL	49	2	11	13	31	7	0	1	1	8
1977–78	Dallas Black Hawks	CHL	21	3	14	17	31	—	—	—	—	—
1978–79	Pittsburgh Penguins	NHL	70	13	34	47	78	7	0	0	0	12
1979–80	Pittsburgh Penguins	NHL	67	8	28	36	45	5	1	0	1	4
1980–81	Pittsburgh Penguins	NHL	76	16	67	83	136	5	4	5	9	9
1981–82	Pittsburgh Penguins	NHL	73	11	64	75	131	5	1	3	4	16
1982–83	Pittsburgh Penguins	NHL	61	15	41	56	110	—	—	—	—	—
1983–84	Pittsburgh Penguins	NHL	50	3	23	26	82	—	—	—	—	—
1983–84	Winnipeg Jets	NHL	5	0	3	3	2	3	0	2	2	4
1984–85	Winnipeg Jets	NHL	71	13	38	51	98	8	1	5	6	13
1985–86	Winnipeg Jets	NHL	68	16	33	49	93	—	—	—	—	—
1986–87	Winnipeg Jets	NHL	71	16	26	42	93	10	1	5	6	18
1987–88	Winnipeg Jets	NHL	78	15	44	59	210	5	0	2	2	10
1988–89	Winnipeg Jets	NHL	78	6	38	44	78	—	—	—	—	—
1989–90	Winnipeg Jets	NHL	53	3	15	18	50	—	—	—	—	—
1990–91	Winnipeg Jets	NHL	52	9	19	28	44	—	—	—	—	—
1991–92	Winnipeg Jets	NHL	66	1	9	10	54	5	1	0	1	6
1992–93	Winnipeg Jets	NHL	22	1	1	2	14	—	—	—	—	—
NHL totals			1,055	148	499	647	1,400	69	9	24	33	120

=== International ===
Year	Team	Event	Results	GP	G	A	Pts	PIM
1989	Canada	WC	2nd place, silver medalist(s)	9	1	4	5	4

== Coaching career ==
=== Winnipeg Jets (1993–1996) ===
Following his retirement as a player, Carlyle remained with the Jets and eventually became an assistant coach with the club in the 1995–96 season under head coach Terry Simpson. The Jets finished the year with a 36–40–6 record to earn the eighth and final playoff position in the Western Conference. Winnipeg faced the Detroit Red Wings and lost to them in six games. Following the season, the Jets relocated to Phoenix, Arizona, and were renamed the Phoenix Coyotes. Carlyle did not follow the team south.

=== Manitoba Moose (1996–2002) ===
Carlyle remained in Winnipeg and became an assistant coach with their new International Hockey League (IHL) team, the Manitoba Moose, under head coach Jean Perron in 1996. The Moose got off to a rough start in 1996–97, going 16–26–8 in their first 50 games. Hoping to save the season, the Moose then fired Perron and promoted Carlyle to become head coach and general manager. Under Carlyle, the Moose improved and went 16–14–2, although the team failed to make the playoffs.

In his first full season as head coach of the Moose in 1997–98, Carlyle led the team to a 39–36–7 record, as the team reached the playoffs. In the first round, the Moose were swept by the Chicago Wolves.

Manitoba improved to a 47–21–14 record in the 1998–99 season, finishing second in the Midwest Division and reaching the playoffs. In the playoffs, the Moose once again lost to Chicago, in the quarter-finals.

In the 1999–2000 season, the Moose slumped to a 37–36–9 record, however they once again made the playoffs in the final playoff spot in the Western Conference. In the pre-playoff round, the Moose lost to the Long Beach Ice Dogs in two games.

Manitoba improved in the 2000–01 season to a 42–33–7 record, finishing third in the Western Conference and in the playoffs. In the post-season, the Moose lost to the Chicago Wolves in the semi-finals.

Following the season, the IHL folded and the Moose moved to the American Hockey League (AHL) to become the top affiliate of the NHL's Vancouver Canucks. Carlyle was promoted to team president, and Stan Smyl replaced him as head coach in 2001–02.

=== Washington Capitals (2002–2004) ===
Carlyle was hired as an assistant coach by the Washington Capitals to work with newly hired head coach Bruce Cassidy for the 2002–03 season. In his first season with the Capitals, the team went 39–29–14, reaching the 2003 playoffs as the sixth seed in the Eastern Conference. In the playoffs, the Capitals were eliminated by the Tampa Bay Lightning in the first round.

Washington struggled badly in the 2003–04 season, with Cassidy being fired after an 8–16–1 start and replaced by Glen Hanlon. Under Hanlon, the Capitals went 15–30–9 as the club finished in 14th place in the Eastern Conference. Carlyle was not brought back after the season.

=== Manitoba Moose (2004–2005) ===
Carlyle returned to the Manitoba Moose as head coach for the 2004–05 season. Under Carlyle, the Moose went 44–26–7–3 to finish third in the North Division. In the playoffs, the Moose upset the higher seeded St. John's Maple Leafs and Rochester Americans before losing to the Chicago Wolves in the Western Conference final. His management style was described as "an up-tempo style reminiscent of the Vancouver Canucks when [Brian] Burke was their general manager", which attracted the services of Brian Burke, the GM of the Mighty Ducks of Anaheim.

=== Mighty Ducks of Anaheim / Anaheim Ducks (2005–2011) ===
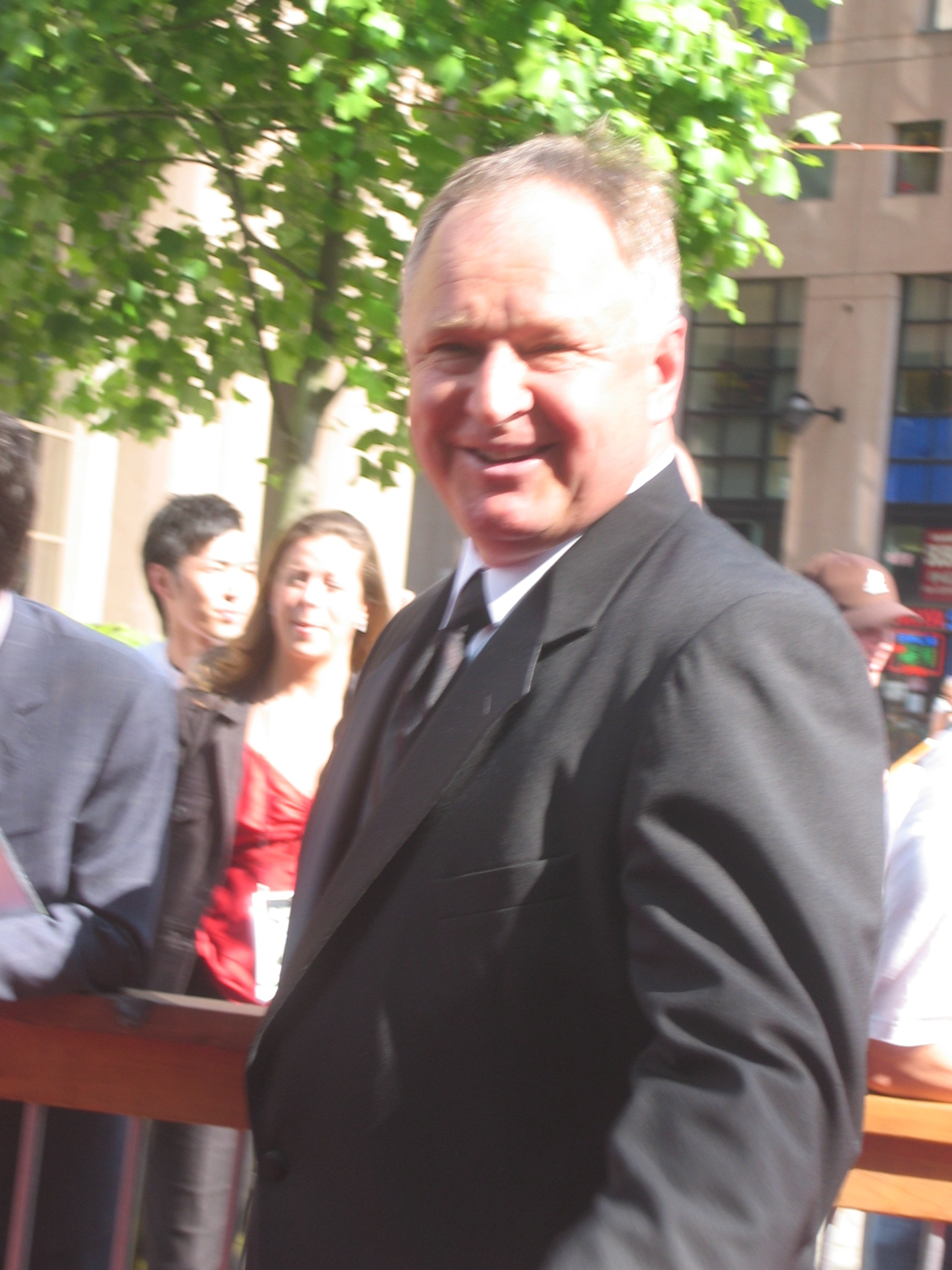
Carlyle in 2006

On August 1, 2005, Carlyle was hired as head coach of the Mighty Ducks of Anaheim; Mike Johnston and John Stevens were the only other candidates considered by Anaheim.

On October 5, 2005, Carlyle coached his first career NHL game, as the Mighty Ducks defeated the Chicago Blackhawks 5–3. In his first season with the Mighty Ducks in the 2005–06 season, Carlyle led the team to a 43–27–12 record, earning a 2006 playoff berth. In the post-season, the Mighty Ducks would be eliminated by the Edmonton Oilers in the Western Conference final.

The Mighty Ducks rebranded themselves as the Anaheim Ducks in 2006–07, and the club finished with a 48–20–14 record, winning their first division title in franchise history, and with it the second seed in the Western Conference. In the 2007 playoffs, the Ducks defeated the Minnesota Wild, Vancouver Canucks and Detroit Red Wings, earning a spot in the 2007 Stanley Cup Final. In the final round against the Ottawa Senators, the Ducks would defeat Ottawa in five games to win their first Stanley Cup in team history and the first Cup for a California team.

The Ducks had another successful season in 2007–08, going 47–27–8 to clinch a playoff spot. Carlyle reached a milestone on February 8, 2008, as he won his 121st game with the Ducks, setting the franchise record for wins by a head coach. In the playoffs, the Ducks were upset by the Dallas Stars in the first round. In September 2009, with a year remaining on his contract, he signed a two-year extension.

In the 2008–09 season, Anaheim slumped to a 42–33–7 record, however they snuck into the playoffs as the eighth and final seed in the Western Conference. In the playoffs, the Ducks defeated the top-seeded San Jose Sharks before falling to the Detroit Red Wings in the second round. The Ducks struggled in the 2009–10 season, going 39–32–11 and failing to reach the playoffs for the first time since Carlyle became head coach.

Anaheim rebounded with a very successful regular season in 2010–11, going 47–30–5, their highest point total since the 2007–08 season, and returned to the playoffs. In December 2010, he agreed to a one-year contract extension through to the 2011–12 season.. In the post-season, the Ducks lost to the Nashville Predators in the first round.

The Ducks struggled badly to begin the 2011–12 season, as the club was 7–13–4 in their first 24 games. On November 30, 2011, the Ducks fired Carlyle and replaced him with former Washington Capitals head coach Bruce Boudreau.

=== Toronto Maple Leafs (2012–2015) ===
On March 2, 2012, the Toronto Maple Leafs (now with Burke as general manager) hired Carlyle as the head coach of the team; he was the 16th man to have played and coached for the Maple Leafs. At the time of the hiring, the Maple Leafs had a 29–28–7 record. On March 3, Carlyle coached his first game with the Leafs, leading the team to a 3–1 win over the Montreal Canadiens. Under Carlyle, the rebuilding club finished the 2011–12 season with a 6–9–3 record in 18 games, failing to reach the playoffs.

In his first full season with Toronto in 2012–13, the Leafs finished with a 26–17–5 record in the lockout-shortened season to qualify for the Stanley Cup playoffs for the first time since 2004. In the playoffs, the Leafs were eliminated by the Boston Bruins in seven games in the first round. In Game 7, the Leafs held a 4–1 lead midway through the third period, however, the Bruins stormed back to tie the game and send it into overtime, in which Boston won the game and the series on a goal by Patrice Bergeron.

In the 2013–14 season, the Leafs finished the season with a 38–36–8 record. With 14 games to play, the Leafs appeared to be comfortably in a spot in the 2014 playoffs. Plagued by an injury to goaltender Jonathan Bernier, the Leafs lost eight consecutive games in regulation and lost twelve of their final fourteen games to miss the playoffs. He received a two-year extension after the season ended, although three members of his coaching staff (Dave Farrish, Scott Gordon, Greg Cronin) were let go.

On January 6, 2015, Carlyle was fired after Toronto lost seven of their last ten games, going 2–7 since and including their first loss in that such stretch of games. Problems in the Leafs defensive and possession game, as well as the lack of advanced statistics progress despite personal additions and line-up changes, also played a role. He finished his tenure as Toronto head coach with a 91–78–19 record.

=== Return to Anaheim (2016–2019) ===
On June 14, 2016, the Ducks announced Carlyle had returned to the team to become their head coach.

On February 10, 2019, the Ducks terminated Carlyle's position as head coach after going 2–15–4 since December 18, with general manager Bob Murray serving as interim head coach for the remainder of the 2018–19 season.

== NHL coaching record ==
Team	Year	Regular season						Postseason			
Team	Year	G	W	L	OTL	Pts	Division rank	Result			
ANA	2005–06	82	43	27	12	98	3rd in Pacific	9	7	.563	Lost in Conference finals (EDM)
ANA	2006–07	82	48	20	14	110	1st in Pacific	16	5	.762	Won Stanley Cup (OTT)
ANA	2007–08	82	47	27	8	102	2nd in Pacific	2	4	.333	Lost in Conference quarterfinals (DAL)
ANA	2008–09	82	42	33	7	91	2nd in Pacific	7	6	.538	Lost in Conference semifinals (DET)
ANA	2009–10	82	39	32	11	89	4th in Pacific	—	—	—	Missed playoffs
ANA	2010–11	82	47	30	5	99	2nd in Pacific	2	4	.333	Lost in Conference quarterfinals (NSH)
ANA	2011–12	24	7	13	4	(21)	(fired)	—	—	—	—
TOR	2011–12	18	6	9	3	(80)	4th in Northeast	—	—	—	Missed playoffs
TOR	2012–13	48	26	17	5	57	3rd in Northeast	3	4	.429	Lost in Conference quarterfinals (BOS)
TOR	2013–14	82	38	36	8	84	6th in Atlantic	—	—	—	Missed playoffs
TOR	2014–15	40	21	16	3	(45)	(fired)	—	—	—	—
TOR total		188	91	78	19	201		3	4	.429	1 playoff appearances
ANA	2016–17	82	46	23	13	105	1st in Pacific	10	7	.588	Lost in Conference finals (NSH)
ANA	2017–18	82	44	25	13	101	2nd in Pacific	0	4	.000	Lost in first round (SJS)
ANA	2018–19	56	21	26	9	(51)	(fired)	—	—	—	—
ANA total		736	384	256	96	864		46	37	.554	7 playoff appearances
Total		924	475	334	115	1,065		49	41	.544	1 Stanley Cup 8 playoff appearances

== Awards and achievements ==
- OMJHL Second All-Star Team: 1976
- James Norris Memorial Trophy: 1981
- NHL First All-Star team: 1981
- NHL All-Star Game: 1981, 1982, 1985, 1993
- "Honoured Member" of the Manitoba Hockey Hall of Fame
- Stanley Cup champion (2007)

== See also ==
- List of NHL players with 1,000 games played

Awards
Preceded by Larry Robinson	Winner of the Norris Trophy; 1981	Succeeded by Doug Wilson
Sporting positions
Preceded by Mike Babcock	Head coach of the Anaheim Ducks; 2005–11	Succeeded by Bruce Boudreau
Preceded by Ron Wilson	Head coach of the Toronto Maple Leafs; 2012–15	Succeeded by Peter Horachek (interim)
Preceded by Bruce Boudreau	Head coach of the Anaheim Ducks; 2016–19	Succeeded by Bob Murray (interim)
Preceded by Orest Kindrachuk	Pittsburgh Penguins captain 1981–84	Succeeded by Mike Bullard
Preceded by Dale Hawerchuk	Winnipeg Jets captain 1989–91 with Dale Hawerchuk, 1989–90 and Thomas Steen, 1989–91	Succeeded by Troy Murray
