= Kevin Wortman =

American ice hockey player (1969–2018)

- Born: February 22, 1969; Saugus, Massachusetts, U.S.
- Died: April 11, 2018 (aged 49); Saugus, Massachusetts, U.S.
- Height: 6 ft 1 in (185 cm)
- Weight: 200 lb (91 kg; 14 st 4 lb)
- Position: Defense
- Shot: Right
- Played for: Calgary Flames; JYP; SERC Wild Wings; Moskitos Essen; Vienna Capitals
- Playing career: 1991–2002

Kevin David Wortman (February 22, 1969 – April 11, 2018) was an American ice hockey player. He played 5 games in the National Hockey League with the Calgary Flames during the 1993–94 season. The rest of his career, which lasted from 1991 to 2002, was mainly spent in European leagues.

== Playing career ==
After spending three seasons at American International College (1988–1991), Wortman began his professional hockey career with the Calgary Flames' affiliate team in the International Hockey League, the Salt Lake Golden Eagles. Wortman was awarded the Ken McKenzie Trophy for Outstanding American-born Rookie in 1991–92 and finished fourth in team scoring during his rookie year.

Even with a successful rookie season in the IHL, Wortman was still back with Salt Lake for the 1992–93 season, once again finishing fourth in team scoring with 63 points and being selected to the IHL Second All-Star Team.

Although he spent the better part of the 1993–94 season leading the American Hockey League's Saint John Flames defensemen in scoring, Wortman made his NHL debut during the 1993–94 season, playing in five games with Calgary, while registering no points.

In the summer of 1994, Wortman signed as a free agent with the San Jose Sharks where he joined their IHL affiliate, the Kansas City Blades, for the 1994–95 season. Spending only one season in Kansas City, Wortman joined the Fort Wayne Komets in 1995–96 before heading to Finland for the next three years and to Germany for the 1999–00 season.

== Personal life ==
Wortman was born to Susan and Frederick Wortman in Saugus, Massachusetts, and was one of 6 children. He attended Saugus High School before going to American International College, where he played hockey. He died on April 11, 2018, in Saugus, Massachusetts. He was the father of Alycia Wortman of Saugus and the former husband of Ellen Jo (Wiswall) Wortman.

== Career statistics ==
=== Regular season and playoffs ===
			Regular season					Playoffs
Season	Team	League	GP	G	A	Pts	PIM	GP	G	A	Pts	PIM
1987–88	American International College	ECAC East	—	—	—	—	—	—	—	—	—	—
1988–89	American International College	ECAC East	—	—	—	—	—	—	—	—	—	—
1989–90	American International College	ECAC East	30	16	21	37	6	—	—	—	—	—
1990–91	American International College	ECAC East	28	21	25	46	6	—	—	—	—	—
1991–92	Salt Lake Golden Eagles	IHL	82	12	34	46	34	5	1	0	1	0
1992–93	Salt Lake Golden Eagles	IHL	82	13	50	63	24	—	—	—	—	—
1993–94	Calgary Flames	NHL	5	0	0	0	2	—	—	—	—	—
1993–94	Saint John Flames	AHL	72	17	32	49	32	7	1	5	6	16
1994–95	Kansas City Blades	IHL	80	6	28	34	22	21	1	1	2	4
1995–96	Fort Wayne Komets	IHL	82	12	21	33	26	5	2	4	6	4
1996–97	JYP	FIN	49	8	15	23	26	4	1	2	3	0
1997–98	JYP	FIN	48	10	16	26	28	—	—	—	—	—
1998–99	JYP	FIN	53	13	13	26	65	—	—	—	—	—
1999–00	SERC Wild Wings	DEL	56	4	12	16	20	—	—	—	—	—
2000–01	Moskitos Essen	DEL	59	5	14	19	36	—	—	—	—	—
2001–02	Vienna Capitals	AUT	32	13	5	18	50	7	2	2	4	29
NCAA totals			116	57	80	137	—	—	—	—	—	—
IHL totals			326	43	133	176	106	31	4	5	9	8
NHL totals			5	0	0	0	2	—	—	—	—	—

== Awards ==
- 1991–92: Ken McKenzie Trophy for Outstanding American-Born Rookie in the International Hockey League
- 1992–93: IHL Second All-Star Team
