= Ken Tyler =

Canadian retired ice hockey coach (born 1951)

- Born: June 8, 1951 (age 73); Toronto, Ontario, Canada
- Coached for: Austria; McGill University

Ken Tyler (born June 8, 1951) is a Canadian retired ice hockey coach. Tyler spent much of his career coaching the Austrian men's national team in international competitions, including the 1994 Winter Olympics.

Born in Toronto, Ontario, Tyler played college hockey at McMaster University, a season of pro with the Broome Dusters and a season of senior hockey with the Cambridge Hornets. Tyler spent nine seasons coaching at McGill University, finishing with a record of 130 wins, 200 losses and 27 ties. During his time at McGill, Tyler heavily recruited Mike Babcock, who would go on to become the first coach to become a member of the Triple Gold Club.

Tyler started his tenure as the head coach of Austria's men's national hockey team at the 1992 IIHF Group B World Championship, which was held in Austria. The team went undefeated and finished first in Group B play, which made them eligible for promotion to the A pool for the following year's tournament. Tyler remained Austria's head coach until after the 1996 IIHF World Championship. At this tournament, Austria finished in 12th place and was relegated to the B Pool for the 1997 tournament. His coaching career with Austria also included their appearance at the 1994 Winter Olympics, where they finished in 12th place.
