= Mike Babcock =

Canadian ice hockey coach (born 1963)

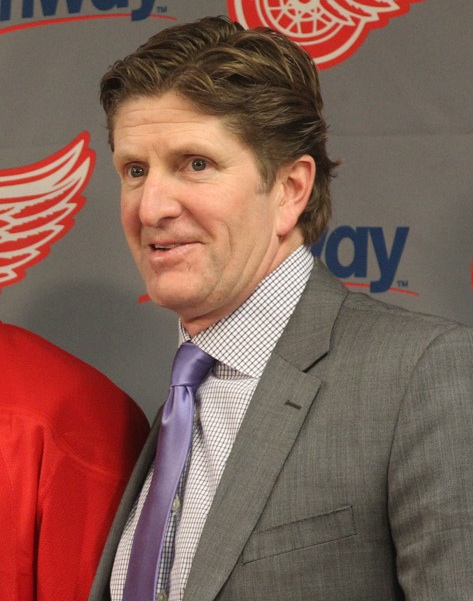
- Babcock in January 2013
- Born: April 29, 1963 (age 63) Manitouwadge, Ontario, Canada
- Current NHL coach: Edmonton Oilers
- Coached for: Mighty Ducks of Anaheim; Detroit Red Wings; Toronto Maple Leafs
- National team: Canada
- Coaching career: 1988–present

Michael Babcock Jr. (born April 29, 1963) is a Canadian professional ice hockey coach and former player who is the head coach for the Edmonton Oilers of the National Hockey League (NHL). He spent parts of 18 seasons as a head coach in the NHL, beginning when he was named head coach of the Mighty Ducks of Anaheim, whom he led to the 2003 Stanley Cup Final. In 2005, Babcock signed with the Detroit Red Wings, winning the Stanley Cup with them in 2008, and helping them to the Stanley Cup playoffs every year during his tenure and setting a record for most wins in Red Wings history. In 2015, he left Detroit to coach the Toronto Maple Leafs, a position he held until he was fired in 2019. During his coaching tenure from 1991 to 2019, Babcock's teams missed the postseason only four times.

Babcock also gained extensive experience coaching internationally. As of November 2026, he is the only coach to gain entry to the Triple Gold Club, winning the Stanley Cup, IIHF World Championships, and coaching an Olympic gold medal-winning team. He guided the Red Wings to the Stanley Cup in 2008; he coached Team Canada to gold at the IIHF Ice Hockey World Championships in 2004; and he coached Canada to gold at both the 2010 Winter Olympics in Vancouver and the 2014 Winter Olympics in Sochi. Babcock is the only coach to win six distinct national or international titles. He also guided Canada to gold at the 2016 World Cup of Hockey, the IIHF World Junior Championships in 1997, and he coached the University of Lethbridge to the CIS University Cup in 1994.

Since the end of his tenure with the Maple Leafs, Babcock has been the subject of public criticism from many former players about his professional conduct, including allegations of verbal abuse and mistreatment.

== Education and playing career ==
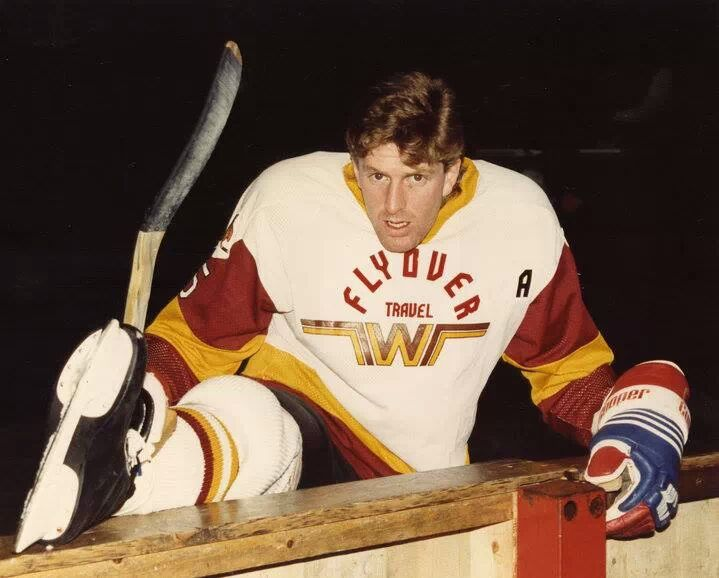
Babcock played in the United Kingdom in 1987 as a player-coach for the Whitley Warriors

Babcock was born in Manitouwadge and grew up in Saskatoon. Babcock played for the Saskatoon Blades of the Western Hockey League (WHL) in 1980–81 and spent a season with the Kelowna Wings in 1982–83. In between, he played a year under Dave King at the University of Saskatchewan, and after Kelowna, he transferred to McGill University to play for coach Ken Tyler. In September 1985, Babcock also attended the Vancouver Canucks NHL training camp, and played one exhibition game with the team.

Babcock graduated from McGill in 1986 with a bachelor's degree in physical education and also did post-graduate work in sports psychology. In 146 career games with the Redmen, he tallied 22 goals and 85 assists for a total of 107 points and 301 penalty minutes, graduating as the second-highest-scoring defenceman in McGill history. Over four seasons from 1983–84 to 1986–87, he was a two-time all-star defenceman, served as captain, and won the Bobby Bell trophy as team MVP. While at McGill, Babcock joined the Tau Alpha chapter of Delta Kappa Epsilon fraternity.

After his time at McGill, Babcock moved to the United Kingdom in 1987 as a player-coach for the Whitley Warriors. The team missed out on the league title by two points. In 49 games, he contributed 45 goals and 127 assists and accumulated 123 penalty minutes.

== Coaching career ==
Babcock is one of four McGill University players to coach an NHL team, joining Lester Patrick with the New York Rangers, George Burnett with the Edmonton Oilers, and Guy Boucher with the Tampa Bay Lightning and Ottawa Senators. In 2008, Babcock became the second McGill hockey player to coach a Stanley Cup winner after Patrick.

Babcock has had a distinguished coaching career, coaching continuously from 1987 to 2019, including from 2002 to 2019 in the NHL. When he was fired by the Maple Leafs in 2019, he had amassed an NHL coaching record of 700-418-164-19, with his 700 wins currently placing him 12th all-time in coaching wins, as of 2023.

=== College, juniors, and minors (1988–2002) ===
==== Red Deer College ====
In 1988, Babcock was appointed head coach at Red Deer College in Alberta. He spent three seasons at the school, winning the provincial collegiate championship and earning coach-of-the-year honours in 1989.

==== Moose Jaw (WHL) ====
Babcock moved to the Western Hockey League (WHL) in 1991, where he guided the Moose Jaw Warriors for a two-year term. Babcock was fired by the team in 1993 after missing the playoffs and nearly left coaching when he accepted a job in business consulting; however, he was then offered the head coaching position at the University of Lethbridge, and decided to accept.

==== University of Lethbridge (CIS) ====
Babcock coached the struggling Lethbridge Pronghorns and helped turn the program around. He earned Canada West coach-of-the-year honours in 1993–94 after guiding Lethbridge to their first-ever appearance in post-season play with a 34–11–3 overall mark and a national CIS Cup title after defeating the Guelph Gryphons 5–2 in the championship final.

==== Spokane (WHL) ====
In 1994, Babcock was appointed head coach of the WHL's Spokane Chiefs, with whom he posted a regular-season record of 224–172–29 over six seasons for a .564 winning percentage. He was twice named as the West Division coach of the year, in 1995–1996 and 1999–2000. The team advanced to the final round of the playoffs in 1995–96, a series they lost 4–1 to the Brandon Wheat Kings. The team also participated in the 1998 Memorial Cup by virtue of hosting the tournament; Spokane lost in the semifinal against the Guelph Storm, 2–1 in overtime.

==== Cincinnati (AHL) ====
From 2000–01 to 2001–02, Babcock guided the American Hockey League's Cincinnati Mighty Ducks to a 74–59–20–7 record, including a franchise-high 41 wins and 95 points. The team qualified for the playoffs in both years.

=== Mighty Ducks of Anaheim (2002–2004) ===
Babcock was named head coach of the NHL's Mighty Ducks of Anaheim on May 22, 2002, and through two seasons, guided them to a combined 69–62–19–14 regular season record. In the Stanley Cup playoffs with the Ducks, he posted a 15–6 record, leading the Mighty Ducks to the team's first Stanley Cup Final in 2003, where they lost in seven games to the New Jersey Devils.

=== Detroit Red Wings (2005–2015) ===
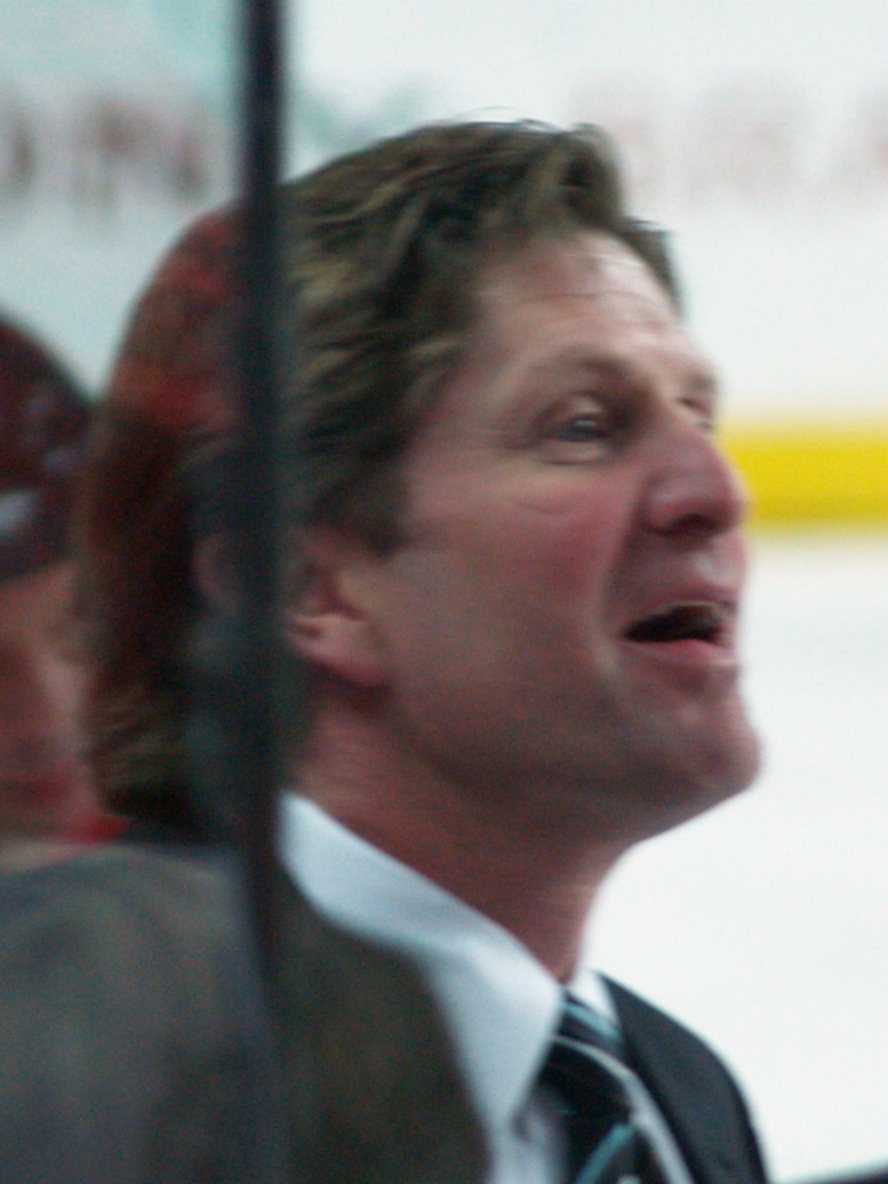
Babcock as head coach of the Detroit Red Wings in April 2007.

Following the 2004–05 NHL lockout, Babcock declined an offer to remain with the Ducks, and on July 15, 2005, was named head coach of the Detroit Red Wings. In his first three seasons, Babcock led the Red Wings to a combined 162–56–28 regular season record and a 28–18 playoff record. The team won the Presidents' Trophy with the league's best record in 2005–06 and 2007–08. In the 2006 playoffs, the heavily favored Red Wings were upset in the first round by the Edmonton Oilers. The following season, Babcock and the Red Wings were eliminated by his former club, the Anaheim Ducks, in the Western Conference finals of the 2007 playoffs; the Ducks went on to win the Stanley Cup.

Babcock earned his 200th NHL career win the following season in Detroit's 5–2 victory over the Florida Panthers on December 15, 2007. Babcock was selected to coach the Western Conference at the 2008 All-Star Game. The Red Wings entered the 2008 playoffs as favorites, and dispatched the Nashville Predators, Colorado Avalanche, and Dallas Stars en route to the Stanley Cup Final. On June 4, 2008, he led the Red Wings to a Stanley Cup championship, the team's fourth since 1997, by defeating the Pittsburgh Penguins in game six of the Cup Final.

Babcock was named a finalist for the Jack Adams Award after the season, awarded to the coach who best contributes to his team's success, but ultimately finished third behind Bruce Boudreau of the Washington Capitals and Guy Carbonneau of the Montreal Canadiens. In June 2008, Babcock signed a three-year contract extension with the Red Wings.

In the 2008–09 season, the Red Wings finished second in the Western Conference and again made the Stanley Cup Final, where they faced a re-match against the Penguins. Although the Wings had home-ice advantage and held a 3–2 series lead after a 5–0 victory at home in game five, the Penguins came back to avenge their loss and defeated Detroit in seven games. With the loss in game seven, Babcock became the first head coach to lose a Stanley Cup Final series in game seven with two different teams.

In October 2010, Babcock signed a four-year extension with the Red Wings that saw him through to the end of the 2014–15 season. In the 2011 playoffs, Babcock's Red Wings fell behind the San Jose Sharks three games to none in the second round but won three straight to force a seventh game, which the Wings lost 3–2.

On April 8, 2014, Babcock earned his 414th career win as head coach of the Red Wings, surpassing Jack Adams for most wins as coach in team history. Babcock was announced as a finalist for the Jack Adams Award for the 2013–14 season, his second nomination, but finished second in voting behind Patrick Roy of the Avalanche.

On December 6, 2014, Babcock earned his 500th career win as a head coach, becoming the second-fastest coach in NHL history to do so; only Hockey Hall of Famer and former Red Wings coach Scotty Bowman reached the 500-win plateau faster.

In 10 seasons with the Wings, Babcock coached the team past the 100-point plateau eight times; however, after their second consecutive trip to the Cup Final in 2009, the team won only three more playoff series under Babcock and failed to advance past the second round.

=== Toronto Maple Leafs (2015–2019) ===
After failing to come to terms on a contract extension with the Red Wings, Babcock received permission to seek employment elsewhere on May 8, 2015. The Buffalo Sabres, who had the best odds at picking first overall in the 2015 NHL entry draft for the right to select phenom Connor McDavid, were considered the most serious contenders for Babcock's services, with the St. Louis Blues and San Jose Sharks also being in the mix. However, on May 20, 2015, it was announced that Babcock would become the new head coach of the Toronto Maple Leafs. He signed an eight-year contract worth $50 million (an average of $6.25 million per season), making him the highest-paid coach in NHL history by more than double the previous record holder's annual earnings. Before Babcock signed the contract, Todd McLellan of the Edmonton Oilers was the highest-paid coach in the NHL, reportedly earning $3 million per season. The Leafs had failed to make the playoffs in nine of the previous ten seasons, and had not won a playoff series since 2004. The signing of Babcock by general manager Lou Lamoriello was seen as an important move in changing the team's fortunes.

On October 7, 2015, Babcock became the first NHL coach to use the league's newly implemented coach's challenge in a season opener loss against the Montreal Canadiens. Babcock coached his 1,000th NHL game during his first season with the Leafs, on February 4, 2016, against the New Jersey Devils. The Maple Leafs finished last overall that season, compiling a record of 29–42–11 for 69 points. However, the rebuilding team had been expected to do poorly. This season marked the first time Babcock missed the playoffs since 2004 with the Mighty Ducks. The last-place finish gave the Maple Leafs the best odds at winning the draft lottery ahead of the 2016 draft. They were awarded the first selection and picked the coveted centre Auston Matthews. The draft helped to increase expectations for the Leafs, and the 2016–17 season was marked by many high-end rookies making the team, including Matthews, William Nylander, Mitch Marner, Zach Hyman, Nikita Zaitsev and Connor Brown. Those rookies, along with the addition of goaltender Frederik Andersen, helped the team to qualify for the 2017 playoffs as the eighth and final seed in the Eastern Conference, marking a rare occasion where a team goes from last in the league to capture a playoff appearance. Toronto faced the back-to-back Presidents' Trophy winning Washington Capitals in the first round. The Maple Leafs pushed the Capitals to six games—with five games going to overtime, tying an NHL record—before the team was eliminated by the Capitals. Babcock's coaching was praised throughout the playoffs as it was during the regular season, with many lauding his attempts at player development while maintaining a high level of team success. Babcock was nominated for the Jack Adams Award, but once again lost, this time to John Tortorella of the Columbus Blue Jackets.

After their rapid turnaround, expectations for the Maple Leafs grew, but despite regular season success having finished as the sixth seed in the Eastern Conference in both the 2017–18 and 2018–19 seasons, the team proved unable to break through in the playoffs, losing seven-game first-round playoff series in back-to-back years to the Boston Bruins in 2018 and 2019.

On November 20, 2019, nearly two months into the 2019–20 season, the Maple Leafs fired Babcock after a six-game losing streak and amidst allegations of a toxic work environment. At the time, the team had a record of 9–10–4 and were outside of the playoffs, despite being projected before the season began to be playoff contenders. This was the first time in Babcock's professional coaching career that he had been fired.

=== College athletics (2020–2022) ===
On July 29, 2020, the University of Vermont announced that Babcock would be joining the school's Catamounts ice hockey team as an unpaid assistant coach under head coach Todd Woodcroft. On February 20, 2021, the University of Saskatchewan Huskies announced that Babcock would become the coach of the men's ice hockey team for two seasons starting May 2021 on a volunteer basis. Babcock took the opportunity to coach in his hometown in large part for the chance to coach alongside his son, Michael Jr, who was pursuing a degree at the university, and joined Michael Jr on the bench as an assistant coach. Despite accepting a position with Saskatchewan, Babcock remained with Vermont until the end of the 2020–21 season.

Babcock opted to resign after one season with the Huskies on August 25, 2022, stating that he wanted to provide an opportunity for a bigger role for the team's assistant coaches. The team had posted a 14–9 record under Babcock. The following day, Babcock announced that he was retiring from coaching.

=== Columbus Blue Jackets (2023) ===
On July 1, 2023, Babcock was named the head coach of the Columbus Blue Jackets, his first NHL position since 2019, signing a two-year, $8 million contract to become the highest paid coach in team history. On September 12, about 10 weeks after being named head coach, allegations of improper behaviour surfaced on the Spittin' Chiclets podcast, with reports Babcock had ordered players to show him their cell phone photos as part of a character-building exercise. In response to the reports, the NHL and NHLPA both opened investigations into Babcock's behaviour. Initial investigations did not find any reports of wrongdoing or discomfort from the players, including general manager Jarmo Kekäläinen, whose photos Babcock had also asked to see. However, as the investigations progressed, it was learned that several players, especially younger members of the roster, were uncomfortable with Babcock's behaviour. Shortly after both investigations concluded, the parties contacted the Blue Jackets with their findings, at which point the team determined there was no scenario for Babcock to stay on. After two days of contract settlement negotiations, Babcock announced his resignation as head coach on September 17, before the start of the team's training camp. The team subsequently apologized to their players for hiring Babcock amid fan criticism, given previous revelations regarding Babcock's perceived toxic coaching methodologies and interactions in both Detroit and Toronto.

=== Edmonton Oilers (2026–present) ===
In early June 2026, reports emerged that the Edmonton Oilers were interested in hiring Babcock after firing Kris Knoblauch the prior month. This interest, and Babcock's controversial departure from Columbus three years prior, initiated an NHL investigation into his prior conduct; Babcock was subsequently cleared to coach again on June 18. On June 23, Babcock was officially named head coach of the Oilers.

== International coaching career ==
In addition to his club coaching roles, Babcock has had a long career coaching with Hockey Canada. He first coached Canada's junior team at the 1997 World Junior Championships in Switzerland, where the country won a fifth consecutive gold medal, defeating the United States 2–0 in the final. Babcock coached Canada's senior team for the first time at the 2004 IIHF World Championships in the Czech Republic, guiding Canada to a second consecutive gold medal with a 5–3 win over Sweden in the final.

On June 24, 2009, Babcock was announced as the head coach of Team Canada for the 2010 Winter Olympics in Vancouver. The team finished the round robin with a regulation win over Norway, a shootout win over Switzerland, and a loss to the United States. In the elimination rounds they defeated Germany, Russia, and then Slovakia to advance to the final, where they defeated the United States 3–2 in overtime to win the gold medal. With the win, Babcock became the first coach—and only thus far—in the International Ice Hockey Federation's Triple Gold Club, which he earned through his team's Olympic Gold, World Championship gold, and 2008 Stanley Cup titles. To honour Babcock's entrance into the Triple Gold Club, his hometown of Saskatoon announced that July 17, 2010 would be known as "Mike Babcock Day."

On July 22, 2013, it was announced that Babcock would return as head coach of Team Canada for the 2014 Winter Olympics in Sochi. The team finished the round robin with regulation wins over Norway, and Austria, and an overtime win over Finland. In the quarterfinals they defeated Latvia, and in the semifinals, they defeated the United States to advance to the gold medal game, where they defeated Sweden 3–0. With the win, Babcock became only the second head coach to lead one country to a gold medal victory in consecutive Olympic appearances, after Viktor Tikhonov with the Soviet team in 1984 and 1988.

Babcock also coached Canada to victory at the 2016 World Cup of Hockey, making him the first and only coach to date to have won the Stanley Cup, World Cup, World Championship, and World Junior Championship, and coach an Olympic gold medal-winning team.

== Coaching style ==
Babcock's teams generally focus on puck possession over physical play and toughness. Babcock emphasized building a team that excelled at puck possession rather than enforcement in Detroit. Babcock's teams consistently had the fewest penalty minutes of any NHL team; from 2005 to 2015, the Red Wings averaged 22 percent fewer penalty minutes than the league average, and 44 percent fewer penalty minutes than the highest league total.

=== Criticism ===
Babcock has faced public criticism from a number of former players who allege mistreatment throughout the length of his NHL career. Mike Commodore was among the first to voice public criticism towards Babcock, and has been among his fiercest critics, stemming from Commodore's days in the Mighty Ducks organization. Commodore has alleged that Babcock purposefully held him back in Cincinnati because he did not like him, doing the same thing a decade later with the Red Wings after reassuring Commodore before the season that he would get playing time if he signed with the team. Babcock addressed Commodore's criticisms in March 2021, stating that Commodore was scratched because he did not perform better than other defenders on the 2011–12 Red Wings team—he claimed that he did not recall many interactions with Commodore in Cincinnati—and refuted that Commodore was scratched because of a personal vendetta.

However, numerous other players have also voiced criticism of Babcock for his management style and treatment of players. Johan Franzén, who played for Babcock in Detroit, called him a "terrible man, the worst person I've ever met," and accused Babcock of verbally abusing him during a game in the first round of the 2012 Stanley Cup playoffs against the Nashville Predators, which was corroborated by former teammate Chris Chelios. On their podcast Spittin' Chiclets, former NHL players Paul Bissonnette and Ryan Whitney described Babcock as "a truly bad person", and his coaching methods as personally directed psychological abuse. They contrasted Babcock with John Tortorella, another coach who is notoriously tough on his players and widely disliked as a result, by noting that Tortorella's methods are hockey related and he treats his players respectfully when off the ice. According to Yahoo! Sports' Nick Ashbourne, Tortorella's blunt style led to "difficult relationships with players at times," but he never treated them in the manner that Babcock treated Marner. Sean Avery has defended Babcock's approach, saying "Babcock wouldn't show his cards. He has a manipulative personality for the purpose of being a good coach — you have to have one. John Tortorella has no manipulation in him whatsoever. He only has one gear, and that's to scream at people and thinks that that's manipulation or motivation."

Babcock has been criticized for mistreating both veteran and rookie players alike. Similar to Tortorella (who benched Vancouver Canucks franchise goalie Roberto Luongo for the Heritage Classic), Babcock has been accused of scratching players ahead of games of personal significance, such as: removing Mike Modano from the lineup before his 1500th game, towards the end of the 2010–11 season in April 2011, without any reasoning behind it; benching Chelios at the 2009 Winter Classic against his hometown team, the Chicago Blackhawks, on January 1, 2009; and not playing Jason Spezza in the Maple Leafs' 2019–20 season-opening game against his former team, the Ottawa Senators (with whom Spezza spent the bulk of his career), without any reasoning and with Spezza's family and friends in attendance. Jason York has accused Babcock of arbitrarily banning a group of three veteran players from the Mighty Ducks training camp in 2002. Babcock was criticized for mistreating Mitch Marner during the 2016–17 season, his rookie season with the Maple Leafs, asking him in a January 2017 meeting to rank his teammates in order of their work ethic and then sharing the list with other members of the team. After teammates Nazem Kadri and Tyler Bozak stormed into Babcock's office on Marner's behalf, Babcock initially defended the exercise, though later apologized to Marner for the incident. Kadri also recalled that Babcock asked all the trainers to rank players on the level of effort they put into their gym routines, on the assumption that the information would be kept confidential, then Babcock shared all these assessments in front of the entire team, suggesting that the aim of this was to embarrass the training staff as well as eroding their standing in the players' eyes. Moreover, Babcock has been accused of verbally abusing arena staff throughout his career.

Although Babcock's coaching acumen has been generally praised as being superior to contemporaries (at times, being seen as the best coach in the sport), the revelations about his treatment of players were seen to have delayed his return to the NHL after he was fired by the Leafs in November 2019, although the actual reason was because he remained under contract with a non-compete clause despite being relieved of his coaching duties with the Leafs. He would not get another NHL job until his hiring by Columbus, once his Leafs contract expired and also as Babcock had professed to Blue Jackets management that he had changed his ways. Babcock's brief tenure with the Blue Jackets was marked by controversy after it was reported in September 2023 that he had asked players in pre-season meetings to look through photos on their phones. Although the team and captain Boone Jenner initially downplayed the alleged incidents, an investigation by the NHLPA revealed that several members of the Blue Jackets were uncomfortable with Babcock's approach and that in at least one instance, Babcock spent several minutes looking through a player's phone. The controversy resulted in Babcock announcing his resignation before coaching a game for the team.

By the end of his time in Columbus, Babcock's coaching methodologies, personality, and interpersonal interactions had led to him being broadly unpopular among hockey players and several hockey circles. Nazem Kadri wrote in his book that Babcock "was really into the psychological aspects of performance. He'd been a psychology major at McGill University, a fact that everyone seemed to know, [and] was interested in ways to motivate players, to get the most out of them by knowing what buttons to press, what games to play". However, "over a long period of time, that can wear on you, and so these kinds of coaches often have a shelf life. Obviously, there was some benefit because Babs had a lot of success". Kadri summed up Babcock as one of a few "old-school authoritarian bench bosses" in the league, and "with players having changed so much over the past decade, there's no longer a place in the league for mind games like that".

== Personal life ==
Babcock is of Irish descent through a grandfather. Babcock and his wife, Maureen, have three children. Born in Manitouwadge, he spent the majority of his childhood moving around between Northern Ontario, Manitoba, and the Northwest Territories, before his family settled in Saskatoon, which he considers his hometown, in 1975. Babcock attended both St. James Elementary School and Holy Cross High School; Babcock is one of the many notable graduates on Holy Cross High School's "Wall of Honour."

Babcock has been an advocate for the Bell Let's Talk campaign, the Centre for Addiction and Mental Health, and other mental health awareness campaigns. In 2017, he became involved with a campaign called Ahead of the Game to raise money for youth mental health in sport.

On November 25, 2013, he was awarded an honorary Doctor of Laws by McGill University. He received the same honour from the University of Saskatchewan on June 2, 2016. Babcock was made a member of the Order of Hockey in Canada in 2018.

== Head coaching record ==
=== WHL ===
Year	Team	W	L	OT/T	Finish	Postseason
1991–92	Moose Jaw Warriors	33	36	3	6th in East	Lost East Division quarterfinal (PAR)
1992–93	Moose Jaw Warriors	27	42	3	8th in East	Did not qualify
1994–95	Spokane Chiefs	32	36	4	5th West	Lost West Division semifinal (TCA)
1995–96	Spokane Chiefs	50	18	4	1st in West	Lost WHL finals (BWK)
1996–97	Spokane Chiefs	35	33	4	3rd in West	Lost West Division semifinal (KEL)
1997–98	Spokane Chiefs	45	23	4	2nd in West	Lost West Division final (POR)
1998–99	Spokane Chiefs	19	44	9	7th in West	Did not qualify
1999–2000	Spokane Chiefs	47	19	6	1st in West	Lost WHL finals (KI)

=== AHL ===
Year	Team	W	L	OT/T	Finish	Postseason
2000–01	Cincinnati Mighty Ducks	41	26	13	2nd in South	Lost in first round (NOR)
2001–02	Cincinnati Mighty Ducks	33	33	14	3rd in Central	Lost in preliminary round (CHI)

=== NHL ===
Team	Year	Regular season							Postseason				
Team	Year	G	W	L	T	OTL	Pts	Finish	G	W	L	Win%	Result
MDA	2002–03	82	40	27	9	6	95	2nd in Pacific	21	15	6	.714	Lost in Stanley Cup Final (NJD)
MDA	2003–04	82	29	35	10	8	76	4th in Pacific	—	—	—	—	Missed playoffs
MDA total		164	69	62	19	14			21	15	6	.714	1 playoff appearance
DET	2005–06	82	58	16	—	8	124	1st in Central	6	2	4	.333	Lost in conference quarterfinals (EDM)
DET	2006–07	82	50	19	—	13	113	1st in Central	18	10	8	.556	Lost in conference finals (ANA)
DET	2007–08	82	54	21	—	7	115	1st in Central	22	16	6	.727	Won Stanley Cup (PIT)
DET	2008–09	82	51	21	—	10	112	1st in Central	23	15	8	.652	Lost in Stanley Cup Final (PIT)
DET	2009–10	82	44	24	—	14	102	2nd in Central	12	5	7	.417	Lost in conference semifinals (SJS)
DET	2010–11	82	47	25	—	10	104	1st in Central	11	7	4	.636	Lost in conference semifinals (SJS)
DET	2011–12	82	48	28	—	6	102	3rd in Central	5	1	4	.200	Lost in conference quarterfinals (NSH)
DET	2012–13	48	24	16	—	8	56	3rd in Central	14	7	7	.500	Lost in conference semifinals (CHI)
DET	2013–14	82	39	28	—	15	93	4th in Atlantic	5	1	4	.200	Lost in first round (BOS)
DET	2014–15	82	43	25	—	14	100	3rd in Atlantic	7	3	4	.429	Lost in first round (TBL)
DET total		786	458	223	—	105			123	67	56	.545	10 playoff appearances 1 Stanley Cup
TOR	2015–16	82	29	42	—	11	69	8th in Atlantic	—	—	—	—	Missed playoffs
TOR	2016–17	82	40	27	—	15	95	4th in Atlantic	6	2	4	.333	Lost in first round (WSH)
TOR	2017–18	82	49	26	—	7	105	3rd in Atlantic	7	3	4	.429	Lost in first round (BOS)
TOR	2018–19	82	46	28	—	8	100	3rd in Atlantic	7	3	4	.429	Lost in first round (BOS)
TOR	2019–20	23	9	10	—	4	22	Fired	—	—	—	—	—
TOR total		351	173	133	—	45			20	8	12	.400	3 playoff appearances
NHL totals		1,301	700	418	19	164			164	90	74	.549	1 Stanley Cup 14 playoff appearances

- Source

Sporting positions
Preceded by Bryan Murray	Head coach of the Mighty Ducks of Anaheim; 2002–2005	Succeeded by Randy Carlyle
Preceded by Dave Lewis	Head coach of the Detroit Red Wings; 2005–2015	Succeeded by Jeff Blashill
Preceded by Peter Horachek; Interim	Head coach of the Toronto Maple Leafs; 2015–2019	Succeeded by Sheldon Keefe
Preceded by Brad Larsen	Head coach of the Columbus Blue Jackets; 2023	Succeeded by Pascal Vincent
Preceded by Kris Knoblauch	Head coach of the Edmonton Oilers; 2026–present	Incumbent
