= List of Anaheim Ducks head coaches =

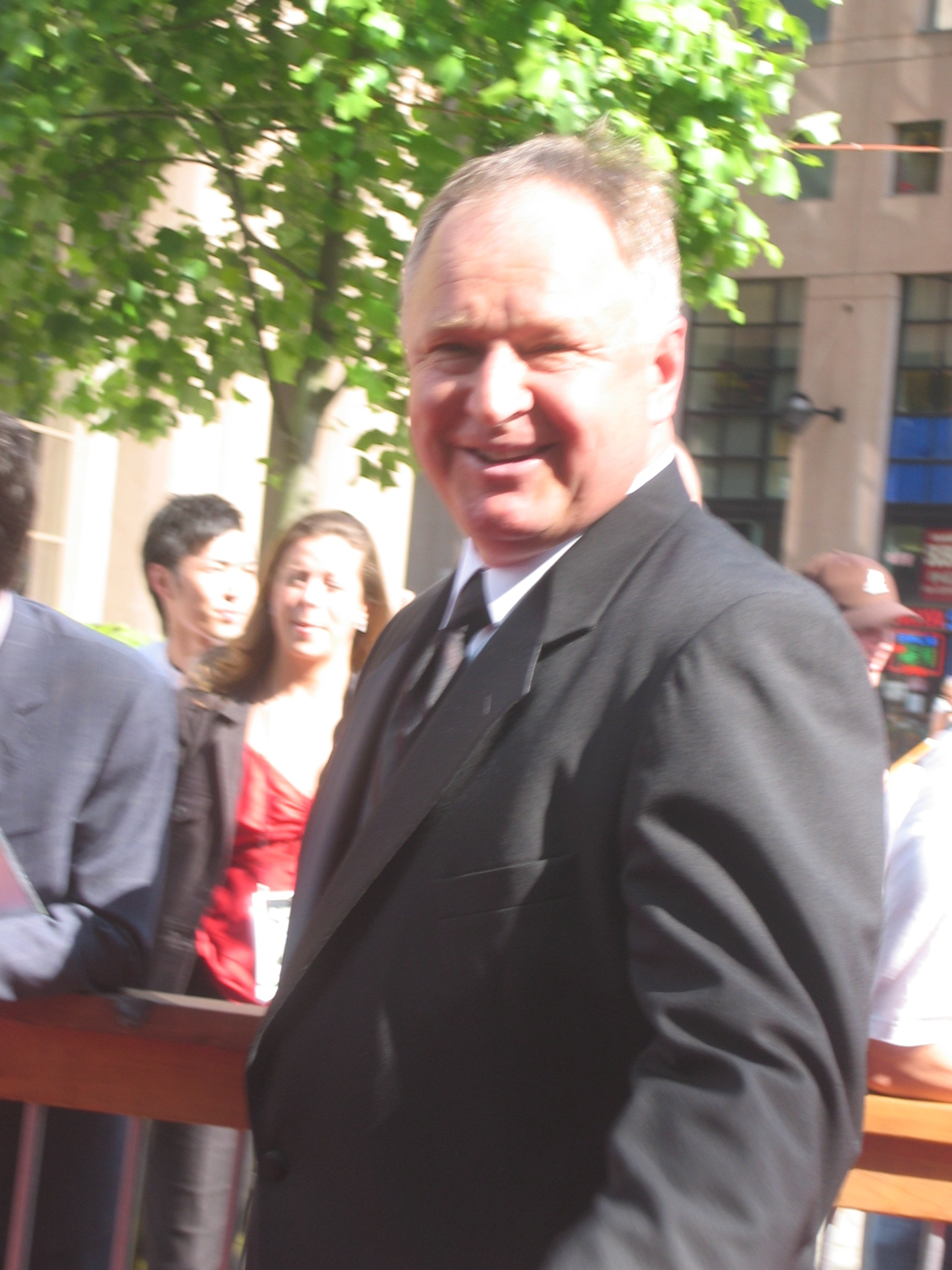
Randy Carlyle is the winningest coach in franchise history; in two combined tenures, he went 384–256–96 as coach.

The Anaheim Ducks are a professional ice hockey team based in Anaheim, California. They play in the Pacific Division of the Western Conference in the National Hockey League (NHL). The franchise was founded in 1993 by The Walt Disney Company as the Mighty Ducks of Anaheim, based on the film The Mighty Ducks. They were then renamed the Anaheim Ducks before the 2006–07 season, in which the Ducks won their first Stanley Cup championship. The Ducks have played their home games at the Honda Center, formerly known as the Anaheim Arena (1993) and the Arrowhead Pond of Anaheim (1993–2006), since their inaugural season. The team is owned by Henry Samueli and his wife Susan, Pat Verbeek is the general manager, and Radko Gudas is the team captain.

There have been 12 head coaches in franchise history. The Mighty Ducks' first head coach was Ron Wilson, who coached for four seasons. Randy Carlyle is the franchise's all-time leader in regular season for most games coached, wins, points, and also in playoff games coached and wins. Carlyle is the only head coach to have won the Stanley Cup. Carlyle was relieved of his coaching duties in on November 30, 2011, and the franchise immediately hired former Washington Capitals coach Bruce Boudreau. Boudreau was released after the 2015–16 season. The franchise rehired Carlyle prior to the 2016–17 season, for his second stint with the organization. After struggling to win games in the 2018–19 season, Carlyle was relieved on February 10, 2019. Franchise's general manager, Bob Murray, replaced Carlyle as interim coach to finish the 2018–19 season. After the conclusion of the season, Dallas Eakins was hired on June 17, 2019, and served as head coach until April 14, 2023, when his contract was not renewed. Greg Cronin was hired on June 5, 2023, to replace Eakins, served two seasons as head coach, before he was fired on April 19, 2025.

The current head coach is Joel Quenneville who was hired on May 8, 2025.

== Key ==
#	Number of coaches (Note: A running total of the number of coaches of the (Mighty) Ducks. Thus, any coach who has two or more separate terms as head coach is only counted once.)
GC	Games coached
W	Wins = 2 points
L	Losses = 0 points
T	Ties = 1 point
OT	Overtime/shootout losses = 1 point (Note: Before the 2005–06 season, the NHL instituted a penalty shootout for regular season games that remained tied after a five-minute overtime period, which prevented ties.)
PTS	Points
Win%	Winning percentage
*	Spent entire NHL head coaching career with the (Mighty) Ducks

== Coaches ==
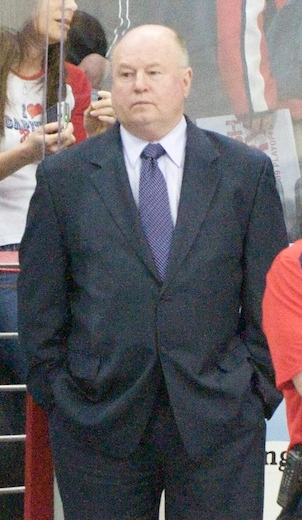
Bruce Boudreau coached the Ducks from 2011 to 2016

Note: Statistics are current through the end of the 2025–26 season.

#	Name	Term (Note: Each year is linked to an article about that particular NHL season.)	Regular season							Playoffs				Achievements	Reference
#	Name	Term	GC	W	L	T	OT	PTS	Win%	GC	W	L	Win%	Achievements	Reference
Mighty Ducks of Anaheim
1	Ron Wilson	1993–1997	296	120	145	31	—	271	.458	11	4	7	.364		
2	Pierre Page	1997–1998	82	26	43	13	—	65	.396	—	—	—	—		
3	Craig Hartsburg	1998–2000	197	80	82	29	6	195	.495	4	0	4	.000		
4	Guy Charron	2000–2001	49	14	26	7	2	37	.378	—	—	—	—		
5	Bryan Murray	2001–2002	82	29	42	8	3	69	.421	—	—	—	—		
6	Mike Babcock	2002–2004	164	69	62	19	14	171	.521	21	15	6	.714		
7	Randy Carlyle	2005–2006	82	43	27	—	12	98	.598	16	9	7	.563		
Anaheim Ducks
—	Randy Carlyle	2006–2011	434	230	155	—	49	509	.588	46	27	19	.587	Stanley Cup champions (2007	
8	Bruce Boudreau	2011–2016	352	208	104	—	40	456	.648	43	24	19	.558		
—	Randy Carlyle	2016–2019	164	90	48	—	26	206	.615	21	10	11	.476		
9	Bob Murray	2019	26	14	11	—	1	29	.558	—	—	—	—		
10	Dallas Eakins	2019–2023	291	100	147	—	44	244	.419	—	—	—	—		
11	Greg Cronin*	2023–2025	164	62	87	—	15	139	.424	—	—	—	—		
12	Joel Quenneville	2025–present	82	43	33	—	6	92	.561	12	6	6	.500		
