= Greg Cronin =

American ice hockey coach

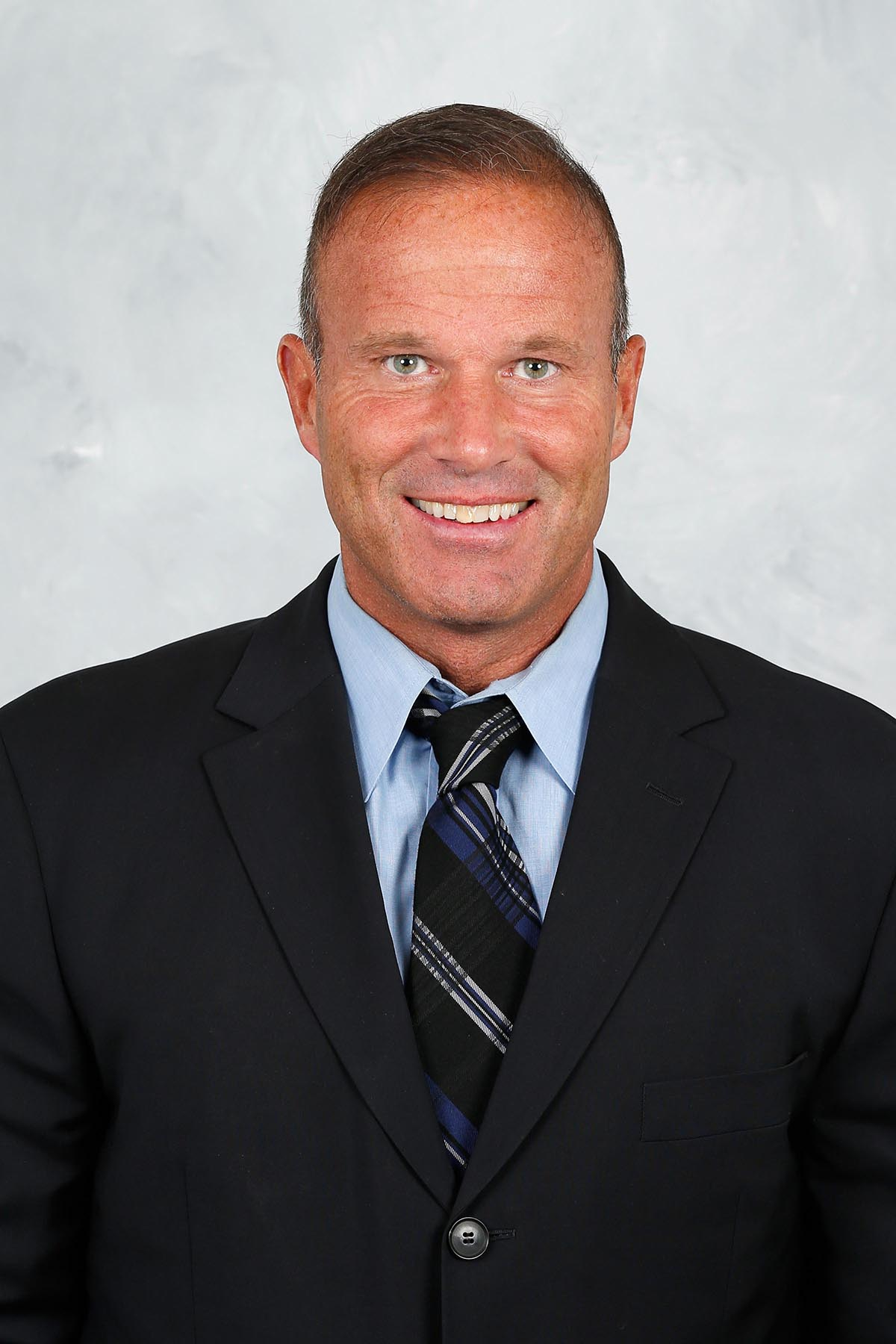
- Cronin in 2018
- Born: June 2, 1963 (age 63) Arlington, Massachusetts, U.S.
- Coached for: Anaheim Ducks
- Coaching career: 1987–present
- Coaching career

Biographical details
- Education: Colby College

Playing career
- 1982–1986: Colby
- Position: Right wing

Coaching career (HC unless noted)
- 1987–1988: Colby (Assistant)
- 1988–1990: Maine (Assistant)
- 1990–1993: Colorado College (Assistant)
- 1993–1995: Maine (Assistant)
- 1995–1996: Maine
- 1997–1998: US NTDP U-18 (Assistant)
- 1998–2003: New York Islanders (Assistant)
- 2003–2005: Bridgeport Sound Tigers
- 2005–2011: Northeastern
- 2011–2014: Toronto Maple Leafs (Assistant)
- 2014–2018: New York Islanders (Assistant)
- 2018–2023: Colorado Eagles
- 2023–2025: Anaheim Ducks
- 2025-2026: Iowa Wild
- 2026-present: St. Louis Blues (Assistant)

Head coaching record
- Overall: 62-87-15 (.424)

Accomplishments and honors

Awards
- 2009 Bob Kullen Coach of the Year Award

Greg Cronin (born June 2, 1963) is an American professional ice hockey coach who currently serves as an assistant coach with the St. Louis Blues. He previously served as the head coach of the Anaheim Ducks from 2023-2025.

== Coaching career ==
Cronin began his career as an assistant coach at his alma mater, Colby College in 1987–88 and then became a graduate assistant at the University of Maine from 1988 to 1990, then as an assistant for Colorado College from 1990 to 1993. He returned to Maine to be an assistant coach from 1993 to 1995 and was named interim head coach following a scandal that banished head coach Shawn Walsh from the bench for one year in 1995–96, leading the Black Bears to the Hockey East championship game in 1996 where they lost to Providence College, 3–2. After four years with Maine, he spent one year as the head coach of the USNTDP Juniors of USA Hockey before joining the New York Islanders in 1998. Cronin served as an assistant coach with the Islanders for 5 seasons before being named their Director of Player Development and head coach of their minor league affiliate, the Bridgeport Sound Tigers, in 2003. He coached the Sound Tigers for 2 seasons with great success, going 78–61–16–5.

In 2005, Cronin replaced Bruce Crowder as head coach of the Northeastern Huskies of the NCAA. Cronin inherited a team that graduated almost all of their key players from a 15–18–5 team and had little hope of competing in the short term. The team went 3–24–7 in 2005–06 before posting a 13–18–5 record the following year behind the development of many of Cronin's recruits. The team further improved to 16–18–3 in 2007–08, winning their first playoff game in years in the 2–1 series loss to the University of Vermont. The Huskies opened the 2008–09 season expected to contend for home-ice advantage in Hockey East (4th place or better) for the first time since 1997–98. The Huskies went 23–9–4 in the regular season, leading the conference until the final day when they lost at Boston College 4–1, falling to second place in Hockey East in the process. Season highlights included Northeastern's first sweep of Maine in 25 years, a win over Boston College in the Beanpot for the first time since 1994, and winning 2 of 3 games against both of the previous season's Hockey East Finalists, Vermont, and Boston College. The Huskies opened the postseason by defeating the University of Massachusetts Amherst in the Hockey East Quarterfinals at Matthews Arena, 2 games to 1, with the 3rd game being won in overtime on a goal by freshman Alex Tuckerman. On February 18, 2011, Cronin was suspended for six games due to possible recruitment violations but was reinstated before Northeastern's quarterfinal playoff series with Boston University. Northeastern would win that series, capturing two of three games at Agganis Arena and make it to the Hockey East semifinals for the second time in three years, where they fell to Boston College.

After six seasons as head coach of the Huskies, Cronin returned to USA hockey before joining the Toronto Maple Leafs as an assistant coach in 2011. He remained with the Maple Leafs until rejoining the New York Islanders in 2014. After three years as an assistant coach and one year as an associate coach, Cronin left the Islanders to become head coach of the Colorado Eagles in 2018.

On June 5, 2023, the Anaheim Ducks hired Cronin as head coach. After two seasons of subpar results, the Ducks announced that he would not return as head coach on April 19, 2025.

Subsequently, on June 23, 2025, the Iowa Wild announced that they were bringing him on to be their next head coach.

On June 15, 2026, Cronin was hired by the St. Louis Blues as an assistant coach.

== Personal life ==
Cronin lives in Boston, and he has many family connections at Northeastern. His father, Don, and his uncle, Jerry, both played hockey for the Huskies in the 1950s and 1960s, and his cousin Kerry played for the women's teams from 1983–86, winning three Beanpots. Greg Cronin spent three years playing hockey for Colby College with his older brother Donny Cronin Jr.

== Head coaching record ==
=== College ===
Record table
Season	Team	Overall	Conference	Standing	Postseason
Maine Black Bears (Hockey East) (1995–1996)
1995–96	Maine	12–6–1†	8–4–1†	3rd	Hockey East runner-up
1996–97	Maine	9–7–1†	2–5–1†		
Maine:		21–13–2	10–9–2		
Northeastern Huskies (Hockey East) (2005–2011)
2005–06	Northeastern	3–24–7	3–17–7	9th	
2006–07	Northeastern	13–18–5	9–13–5	7th	Hockey East Quarterfinals
2007–08	Northeastern	16-18-3	12-13-2	6th	Hockey East Quarterfinals
2008–09	Northeastern	25–12–4	18–6–3	2nd	NCAA Midwest Regional semifinals
2009–10	Northeastern	16–16–2	11–14–2	9th	
2010–11	Northeastern	14–16–8	10–10–7	6th	Hockey East Semifinals
Northeastern:		87–104–29	63–73–26		
Total:		108–117–31			
National champion Postseason invitational champion Conference regular season champion Conference regular season and conference tournament champion Division regular season champion Division regular season and conference tournament champion Conference tournament champion

† Cronin served as the head coach for Maine during the year-long suspension of Shawn Walsh starting on December 23, 1995

=== NHL ===
Team	Year	Regular season						Postseason			
Team	Year	G	W	L	OTL	Pts	Finish	W	L	Win %	Result
ANA	2023–24	82	27	50	5	59	7th in Pacific	—	—	—	Missed playoffs
ANA	2024–25	82	35	37	10	80	6th in Pacific	—	—	—	Missed playoffs
Total		164	62	87	15			—	—	—	

Awards and achievements
Preceded by Kevin Sneddon	Bob Kullen Coach of the Year Award; 2008–09	Succeeded by Mark Dennehy; Dick Umile
Sporting positions
Preceded by Dallas Eakins	Head coach of the Anaheim Ducks; 2023–2025	Succeeded by Joel Quenneville
