= Mike Doneghey =

American ice hockey coach (born 1970)

Biographical details
- Born: July 28, 1970 (age 56); West Roxbury, Massachusetts, U.S.
- Education: Merrimack College

Playing career
- 1989–1993: Merrimack
- 1993–1995: OHC Paris-Viry
- Position: Goaltender

Coaching career (HC unless noted)
- 1995–1996: Hamilton (Assistant)
- 1996–1997: New Hampshire (Assistant)
- 1997–1999: Fairfield
- 1999–2005: Merrimack (Assistant)
- 2005–2009: Bridgewater Bandits
- 2009–Present: Chicago Blackhawks (Scout)

Head coaching record
- Overall: 13-43-0 (.232) (College)

Mike Doneghey is an American ice hockey former head coach and player who has served as a scout for the Chicago Blackhawks since 2009.

== Career ==
Doneghey was drafted by the Blackhawks in the 12th round of the 1989 NHL entry draft before heading to Merrimack to start his college career. In four years with the Warriors Doneghey had an unspectacular but respected tenure, receiving the coaches award in his senior season. After graduating in 1993 with a sociology degree he moved to France and played two seasons for OHC Paris-Viry before retiring as a player.

Doneghey returned to the college game in 1995, becoming an assistant for Division III Hamilton College for one year before jumping up to Division I, taking the same job with New Hampshire. In the fall of 1997, with Fairfield ready to begin D-I play the next year, Doneghey accepted the offer to become the team's new head coach. Although Fairfield was still a Division III program at the time they started offering athletic scholarships for the 1997–98 season (a violation of D-III regulations) and were ruled ineligible for postseason play. The 1998–99 campaign was the first at the D-I level for not only Fairfield, but the entire MAAC ice hockey conference. Even among a group of newcomers the Stags were woefully unprepared for the level of play, winning only 1 contest all season and being outscored 64 to 227 thorough it all. Despite one of the worst records in NCAA history Fairfield made the conference tournament (all 8 teams qualified) but lost their opening round match to Quinnipiac 13-2. Once the disastrous season ended it came as little surprise when Doneghey was replaced.

Doneghey remained in the coaching ranks, returning to his alma mater to serve as an assistant coach for six years before his next big offer came, this time from the Bridgewater Bandits of the EJHL. In his first four years with the team Doneghey got the bandits into the playoffs each season but couldn't win a single game until his fourth attempt, downing the Syracuse Stars 1-0-1 in the quarterfinals before falling in the Semis. He was unable to build on that success, however, and after the Bandits missed the playoffs in each of the next two years he was out as head coach.

After almost 15 years in coaching Doneghey switched jobs and became a scout for the Chicago Blackhawks starting in 2009. His move couldn't have come at a more opportune time as the team won the Stanley Cup that season (its first in 49 years) followed by two more over the next five years.

== Head coaching record ==
=== College ===
Record table
Season	Team	Overall	Conference	Standing	Postseason
Fairfield Stags (ECAC North/South/Central) (1997–1998)
1997–98	Fairfield	12-12-0			
Fairfield:		12-12-0			
Fairfield Stags (MAAC) (1998–1999)
1998–99	Fairfield	1-31-0	1-27-0	8th	MAAC Quarterfinals
Fairfield:		1-31-0	1-27-0		
Total:		13-43-0			
National champion Postseason invitational champion Conference regular season champion Conference regular season and conference tournament champion Division regular season champion Division regular season and conference tournament champion Conference tournament champion
