= List of Merrimack Warriors men's ice hockey seasons =

This is a season-by-season list of records compiled by Merrimack in men's ice hockey.

Merrimack has made several appearances in the NCAA Tournament and won the inaugural Division II national championship.

== Season-by-season results ==
Note: GP = Games played, W = Wins, L = Losses, T = Ties

NCAA Champions	NCAA Frozen Four	Conference regular season champions	Conference Playoff Champions

Season	Conference	Regular season (Note: Code explanation; GP—Games Played, W—Wins, L—Losses, T—Tied games, OTW—Overtime Wins, OTL—Overtime Loses, 3/SW—Win in 3 on 3 overtime or shootout, Pts—Points*)														Conference Tournament Results	National Tournament Results
Season	Conference	Conference									Overall					Conference Tournament Results	National Tournament Results
Season	Conference	GP	W	L	T	OTW	OTL	3/SW	Pts*	Finish	GP	W	L	T	%	Conference Tournament Results	National Tournament Results
Jim Reynolds (1956–1964)
1956–57	Independent	–	–	–	–	–	–	–	–	–	9	4	4	1	.500		
1957–58	Independent	–	–	–	–	–	–	–	–	–	11	6	3	2	.636		
1958–59	Independent	–	–	–	–	–	–	–	–	–	12	7	5	0	.583		
1959–60	Independent	–	–	–	–	–	–	–	–	–	9	3	6	0	.333		
1960–61	Independent	–	–	–	–	–	–	–	–	–	12	5	7	0	.417		
1961–62	ECAC Hockey	13	7	6	0	–	–	–	.538	13th	13	7	6	0	.538		
1962–63	ECAC Hockey	13	6	7	0	–	–	–	.462	17th	13	6	7	0	.462		
1963–64	ECAC Hockey	13	6	7	0	–	–	–	.462	18th	15	8	7	0	.533		
College Division
Ron Ryan (1964–1965)
1964–65	ECAC 2	7	4	3	0	–	–	–	.571	–	14	6	8	0	.429		
J. Thom Lawler (1965–1978)
1965–66	ECAC 2	9	4	4	1	–	–	–	.500	4th	19	8	10	1	.447	Won Semifinal, 4–1 (American International); Lost Championship, 0–5 (Colby)	
1966–67	ECAC 2	9	6	3	0	–	–	–	.667	4th	22	13	9	0	.591	Won Semifinal, 12–3 (Norwich); Won Championship, 6–4 (Colby)	
1967–68	ECAC 2	11	10	1	0	–	–	–	.909	1st	26	18	8	0	.692	Won Semifinal, 6–1 (American International); Won Championship, 5–4 (Hamilton)	
1968–69	ECAC 2	9	7	2	0	–	–	–	.778	1st	21	8	13	0	.381	Lost Semifinal, 3–5 (Norwich)	
1969–70	ECAC 2	13	9	4	0	–	–	–	.692	4th	26	13	13	0	.500	Lost Semifinal, 1–9 (Bowdoin)	
1970–71	ECAC 2	16	8	7	1	–	–	–	.531	13th	29	12	16	1	.431		
1971–72	ECAC 2	17	13	4	0	–	–	–	.765	5th	25	16	9	0	.640	Won Quarterfinal, 4–2 (Salem State); Lost Semifinal, 2–4 (Massachusetts)	
1972–73	ECAC 2	19	13	5	1	–	–	–	.711	4th	32	18	12	2	.640	Won Quarterfinal, 3–2 (Norwich); Lost Semifinal, 3–4 (Vermont)	
Division II
1973–74	ECAC 2	23	15	6	2	–	–	–	.696	5th	36	21	13	2	.611	Won Quarterfinal, 4–3 (Norwich); Won Semifinal, 7–2 (Salem); Lost Championship, 2–6 (Vermont)	
1974–75	ECAC 2	24	21	2	1	–	–	–	.896	1st	32	23	8	1	.734	Won Quarterfinal, 4–3 (Lowell Tech); Lost Semifinal, 7–2 (Hamilton)	
1975–76	ECAC 2	23	21	2	0	–	–	–	.913	1st	31	24	7	0	.774	Won Quarterfinal, 7–4 (Buffalo); Won Semifinal, 8–2 (Army); Lost Championship, 5–6 (Bowdoin)	
1976–77	ECAC 2	23	20	2	1	–	–	–	.891	3rd	35	23	11	1	.671	Won Quarterfinal, 5–1 (Elmira); Won Semifinal, 6–2 (Lowell); Won Championship, 6–4 (Union)	
1977–78	ECAC 2	21	16	4	1	–	–	–	.786	2nd	32	21	9	2	.688	Won East Quarterfinal, 12–3 (St. Anselm); Won East Semifinal, 6–3 (Lowell); Lost East Championship, 0–3 (Bowdoin)	Won National semifinal, 6–1 (Mankato State); Won National Championship, 12–2 (Lake Forest)
Bruce Parker (1978–1983)
1978–79	ECAC 2	25	20	5	0	–	–	–	.688	T–2nd	35	24	10	1	.700	Won East Quarterfinal, 4–1 (Holy Cross); Lost East Semifinal, 6–7 (Lowell)	
1979–80	ECAC 2	24	14	8	2	–	–	–	.625	6th	38	22	13	3	.618	Won East Quarterfinal, 9–3 (Babson); Won East Semifinal, 5–4 (OT) (Bowdoin); Won East Championship, 4–0 (Lowell)	Lost National semifinal, 1–4 (Elmira); Lost Third-place game, 7–8 (Lowell)
1980–81	ECAC 2	23	17	6	0	–	–	–	.739	2nd	35	19	16	0	.543	Won East Quarterfinal, 10–7 (Holy Cross); Won East Semifinal, 5–3 (Salem State); Lost East Championship, 4–6 (Lowell)	
1981–82	ECAC 2	26	17	8	1	–	–	–	.673	3rd	40	22	17	1	.543	Won East Quarterfinal, 7–4 (Bowdoin); Won East Semifinal, 3–2 (Babson); Lost East Championship, 1–5 (Lowell)	Won National Quarterfinal series, 11–7 (Mankato State); Lost National semifinal, 3–4 (Lowell); Lost Third-place game, 5–8 (Gustavus Adolphus)
1982–83	ECAC 2	25	10	15	0	–	–	–	.400	–	33	13	20	0	.394		
Ron Anderson (1983–1998)
1983–84	ECAC 2	20	10	10	0	–	–	–	.500	5th	32	13	19	0	.406	Lost East Quarterfinal, 4–7 (Norwich)	Won National semifinal series, 9–7 (New Hampshire College); Lost National Championship Series, 4–14 (Bemidji State)
Division III
1984–85	ECAC East	22	12	6	3	–	–	–	.643	3rd	36	16	17	3	.486	Lost East Quarterfinal, 3–5 (Bowdoin)	
1985–86	ECAC East	24	17	5	2	–	–	–	.750	2nd	33	19	12	2	.606	Won Quarterfinal, 7–3 (Colby); Lost Semifinal, 2–3 (2OT) (Babson)	
1986–87	ECAC East	27	25	2	0	–	–	–	.926	1st	36	29	7	0	.806	Won Quarterfinal, 6–2 (Connecticut); Won Semifinal, 3–2 (Norwich); Won Championship, 3–0 (Babson)	
1987–88	ECAC East	25	25	0	0	–	–	–	1.000	1st	40	34	6	0	.850	Won Quarterfinal, 7–1 (Holy Cross); Won Semifinal, 7–2 (Salem State); Won Championship, 4–1 (Bowdoin)	Won D–I First round series, 10–8 (Northeastern); Lost D–I Quarterfinal series, 4–8 (Lake Superior State)
1988–89	ECAC East	18	16	2	0	–	–	–	.889	1st	34	27	7	0	.794	Won Semifinal, 12–1 (Massachusetts–Boston); Won Championship, 9–4 (Bowdoin)	
Division I
1989–90	Hockey East	21	3	18	0	–	–	–	6	8th	36	10	25	1	.292	Lost Quarterfinal series, 1–2 (Boston College)	
1990–91	Hockey East	21	7	14	0	–	–	–	14	6th	33	13	19	1	.409	Lost Quarterfinal, 1–7 (Boston University)	
1991–92	Hockey East	21	4	17	0	–	–	–	8	8th	34	13	21	0	.382	Lost Quarterfinal, 0–7 (Maine)	
1992–93	Hockey East	24	8	16	0	–	–	–	16	6th	36	14	20	2	.417	Lost Quarterfinal series, 0–2 (New Hampshire)	
1993–94	Hockey East	24	8	14	2	–	–	–	18	7th	37	16	19	2	.459	Lost Quarterfinal series, 0–2 (Massachusetts–Lowell)	
1994–95	Hockey East	24	7	12	5	–	–	3	50	7th	37	14	18	5	.446	Lost Quarterfinal, 3–4 (Boston University)	
1995–96	Hockey East	24	4	18	2	–	–	0	24	9th	34	10	19	5	.368		
1996–97	Hockey East	24	11	11	2	–	–	–	24	5th	36	15	19	2	.444	Lost Quarterfinal series, 0–2 (Boston College)	
1997–98	Hockey East	24	4	20	0	–	–	–	8	T–8th	38	11	26	1	.444	Won Quarterfinal series, 2–1 (Boston University); Lost Semifinal, 2–7 (Boston College)	
Chris Serino (1998–2005)
1998–99	Hockey East	24	7	16	1	–	–	–	15	8th	36	11	24	1	.319	Lost Quarterfinal series, 0–2 (New Hampshire)	
1999–00	Hockey East	24	6	12	6	–	–	–	18	7th	36	11	19	6	.389	Lost Quarterfinal series, 0–2 (New Hampshire)	
2000–01	Hockey East	24	7	14	3	–	–	–	17	8th	38	14	20	4	.389	Lost Quarterfinal series, 0–2 (Boston College)	
2001–02	Hockey East	24	6	16	2	–	–	–	14	8th	36	11	23	2	.333	Lost Quarterfinal series, 0–2 (New Hampshire)	
2002–03	Hockey East	24	7	13	4	–	–	–	18	7th	36	12	18	6	.417	Lost Quarterfinal series, 0–2 (Boston College)	
2003–04	Hockey East	24	6	12	6	–	–	–	18	7th	36	11	19	6	.389	Lost Quarterfinal series, 0–2 (Maine)	
2004–05	Hockey East	24	1	22	1	–	–	–	3	9th	36	8	26	2	.250		
Mark Dennehy (2005–2018)
2005–06	Hockey East	24	3	19	5	–	–	–	11	9th	34	6	23	5	.250		
2006–07	Hockey East	27	3	22	2	–	–	–	8	9th	34	3	27	4	.147		
2007–08	Hockey East	27	6	18	3	–	–	–	15	9th	34	12	18	4	.412		
2008–09	Hockey East	27	5	19	3	–	–	–	13	T–9th	34	9	21	4	.324		
2009–10	Hockey East	27	12	13	2	–	–	–	26	T–6th	37	16	19	2	.389	Lost Quarterfinal series, 1–2 (Boston University)	
2010–11	Hockey East	27	16	8	3	–	–	–	35	4th	39	25	10	4	.692	Won Quarterfinal series, 2–0 (Maine); Won Semifinal, 4–1 (New Hampshire); Lost Championship, 3–5 (Boston College)	Lost Regional semifinal, 3–4 (OT) (Notre Dame)
2011–12	Hockey East	27	13	9	5	–	–	–	31	5th	37	18	12	7	.581	Lost Quarterfinal series, 1–2 (Maine)	
2012–13	Hockey East	27	13	11	3	–	–	–	29	6th	38	15	17	6	.474	Lost Quarterfinal series, 0–2 (Boston University)	
2013–14	Hockey East	20	3	15	2	–	–	–	8	11th	33	8	22	3	.288	Lost Opening Round series, 0–2 (Maine)	
2014–15	Hockey East	22	5	14	3	–	–	–	13	11th	38	16	18	4	.474	Won Opening Round series, 2–0 (Northeastern); Lost Quarterfinal series, 0–2 (Boston University)	
2015–16	Hockey East	22	5	10	7	–	–	–	17	7th	39	13	19	7	.423	Won Opening Round series, 2–1 (New Hampshire); Lost Quarterfinal series, 0–2 (Providence)	
2016–17	Hockey East	22	8	8	6	–	–	–	22	7th	37	15	16	6	.486	Lost Opening Round series, 1–2 (New Hampshire)	
2017–18	Hockey East	24	7	15	2	–	–	–	16	10th	37	12	21	4	.378	Won Opening Round series, 2–0 (Massachusetts–Lowell); Lost Quarterfinal series, 0–2 (Boston College)	
Scott Borek (2018–Present)
2018–19	Hockey East	24	4	18	2	–	–	–	10	11th	34	7	24	3	.250		
2019–20	Hockey East	24	7	14	3	–	–	–	17	10th	34	9	22	3	.309		
2020–21	Hockey East	18	5	11	2	0	1	0	.333	9th	18	5	11	2	.333	Participation Cancelled	
2021–22	Hockey East	24	13	11	0	1	3	0	41	T–4th	35	19	15	1	.557	Won Opening Round, 6–2 (Maine); Lost Quarterfinal, 2–7 (Massachusetts Lowell)	
2022–23	Hockey East	24	16	8	0	2	4	0	50	2nd	38	23	14	1	.618	Won Quarterfinal, 1–0 (2OT) (Boston College); Won Semifinal, 2–1 (2OT) (Massachusetts Lowell); Lost Championship, 2–3 (OT) (Boston University)	Lost Regional semifinal, 0–5 (Quinnipiac)
2023–24	Hockey East	24	6	17	1	0	1	1	21	10th	35	13	21	1	.386	Lost First Round, 0–4 (Northeastern)	
2024–25	Hockey East	24	9	14	1	1	0	1	28	8th	35	13	21	1	.386	Lost First Round, 2–3 (OT) (Northeastern)	
Totals											GP	W	L	T	%	Championships	
Regular season											2003	901	971	141	.483	4 ECAC 2 Championships, 3 ECAC East Championships	
Conference Post-season											109	50	59	0	.459	4 ECAC 2 tournament championships, 3 ECAC East tournament championships	
NCAA Post-season											18	8	10	0	.444	3 NCAA D–I Tournament appearances, 4 NCAA D–II Tournament appearances	
Regular season and Post-season Record											2140	959	1040	141	.481	1 D–II National Championship	

* Winning percentage is used when conference schedules are unbalanced.
† Denver's participation in the 1973 tournament was later vacated.
