= Bruce Parker (ice hockey) =

American ice hockey player and coach

Biographical details
- Born: December 26, 1941 (age 84); Winchester, Massachusetts, U.S.
- Education: Bowdoin College

Playing career
- 1959-1963: Bowdion College
- 1963-1969: Berlin Maroons
- 1969-1973: Concord Eastern Olympics
- 1976-1977: Concord Budmen
- Position: Defenceman

Coaching career (HC unless noted)
- 1963-1967: Berlin HS assistant
- 1967-1969: Berlin HS
- 1969-1974: Acton-Boxborough HS
- 1974-1978: Methuen HS
- 1978-1983: Merrimack
- 1983-1988: Montclair HS
- 1989-1991: Bourne HS
- 1991-1999: Framingham HS
- 1999-2006: Montclair HS
- 2010-2013: Seton Hall Prep

Head coaching record
- Overall: 100-76-5(.568) College
- Tournaments: 1–2

Accomplishments and honors

Championships
- NHIAA State championship 1968; NHIAA State Championship 1969; MIAA State Championship 1974; MIAA State Championship 1975; MIAA State Championship 1976; MIAA State Championship 1977; MIAA State Championship 1978; ECAC 2 Tournament Champion 1980; NJSIAA State Championship 1987; NJSIAA State Championship 1988; MIAA State Championship 1992

Awards
- New Hampshire Legends Hockey Hall of Fame (2014); New Jersey high school Ice hockey hall of fame (2016)

Bruce Parker (born December 26, 1941) is an American former ice hockey player who was coach for Merrimack College and eight different high school teams throughout the Northeastern United States.

== Playing career ==
Parker grew up in Wakefield and Reading, Massachusetts. After graduating high school he went on to Bowdoin College in 1959. He would play for their hockey program for the next four seasons. In his senior year he broke the program record for most goals scored by a defenseman, with 15. After college he played 6 seasons for the Berlin Maroons, winning two National AHA Championships in 1967 and 1968. From 1969 to 1973 he played for the Concord Eastern Olympics. His final season was in 1976, playing for the Concord Budmen.

== Coaching career ==
Parker first got into coaching in 1963 when he joined Berlin High School in New Hampshire as an assistant. He became the head coach in 1967 and led Berlin to back-to-back state championships in 1968 and 1969. In 1970 Parker moved to Massachusetts and became the head coach of Acton-Boxborough High. He held the position from 1970 to 1974 and led them to a state championship in his final year. He moved on to coach Methuen High School for the next four seasons and led them to four straight state championships.

In 1978 Parker was offered the head coaching and athletic director job at Merrimack College following the passing of their former coach J Thom Lawler. Parker had big shoes to fill as the school was coming of a national championship the year prior. Parker would do a good job at keeping the programs winning ways. As in just his first year he would go 24-10-1 finishing 2nd in conference standings. He would make it all the way to the ECAC 2 championship game before eventually losing to UMass Lowell. The following year he would lead the warriors to another 20 win season. As the 6th seed in the tournament they would play Babson in the first round beating they pretty comfortably 9-3. They would then take down the 1 seed Bowdoin 5-4. Parker and the warriors would once again face Lowell in ECAC 2 championship game but this time they would get revenge winning 4-0. With the championship win the warriors would get atomic bid to the 1980 NCAA tournament. Where they would lose in the frozen four to Elmira 4-1. The following year during the 1980-81 season Parker and the warriors would once again be runners up in the ECAC tournament. During the 1981-82 season the D2 NCAA tournament would expand. Parker and his team would take advantage of this getting a at large bid to the tournament going 20-16-1 during the regular season. They would face Mankato State in the first round and beat them on aggregate 11-7. But they would once again lose in the Frozen Four to Lowell. Parker would step down the following year after his only losing season. He finished his time at Merrimack with an overall record of 100-76-5.

After leaving Merrimack in 1983 he returned to the high school level, coaching at Montclair high school where he led them to back to back state titles in 1987 and 1988. The 1988 team boasted a 26-2 record and is considered one of the best teams in state history. Following a brief stint at Bourne high school, Parker then took the job at Framingham high where he led them to a state title in 1992. Parker continued to coach at the high school level all the way till 2013. By the end of his career he had won a total of nine state championships in Massachusetts, New Hampshire, and New Jersey. He was later inducted into the New Hampshire Legends Hockey Hall of Fame in 2014. Then into the New Jersey high school ice hockey hall of fame in 2016.

== Personal life ==
Along with being a hockey coach. Parker also served as AP Calculus teacher and an athletic director at numerous high schools. He currently resides at his lake side cottage in Maine.

== Head coaching record ==
| Season | Team | Overall | Conference | Standing | Postseason |
|---|---|---|---|---|---|
| 1978-79 | Merrimack Warriors | 24-10-1 | 20-5 | 2nd | ECAC 2 runner up |
| 1979-80 | Merrimack Warriors | 22-13-2 | 14-8-2 | 6th | ECAC 2 champions NCAA Frozen four |
| 1980-81 | Merrimack Warriors | 19-16 | 17-6 | 2nd | ECAC 2 runner up |
| 1981-82 | Merrimack Warriors | 22-17-1 | 17-8-1 | 3rd | NCAA frozen four |
| 1982-83 | Merrimack Warriors | 13-20 | 10-15 | 11th | Did not qualify |
| | Merrimack | 100-76-5 | | | |
| | Total | 100-76-5 | | | |
