= Merrimack Warriors men's soccer =

American college soccer team

- Founded: 1970; 56 years ago
- University: Merrimack College
- Head coach: Tony Martone (39th season)
- Conference: MAAC
- Location: North Andover, Massachusetts, US
- Stadium: Martone-Mejail Field (capacity: 3,000)
- Nickname: Warriors
- Colors: Blue and gold
Home	Away

NCAA tournament appearances
- Division II: 2012, 2014, 2015, 2016, 2017

Conference tournament championships
- Northeast10: 1995, 1996, 1997, 2017

Conference regular season championships
- NEC: 2019; Northeast10: 1994, 1996, 1997, 2012

The Merrimack Warriors men's soccer program represents the Merrimack College in all NCAA Division I men's college soccer competitions. Founded in 1970, the Warriors compete in the Metro Atlantic Athletic Conference. The Warriors are coached by Tony Martone, who has coached the program for 39 years, the longest of any NCAA men's program. Merrimack play their home matches at Martone-Mejail Field.

In 2019, the Warriors began play in Division I, reclassified from Division II. In their inaugural Division I season, the Warriors earned their first Northeast Conference regular season championship and fifth overall. Due to their reclassification, they could not compete in the NEC Tournament. In 2024 the Warriors joined the MAAC conference

== History ==
The Merrimack soccer team dates back to 1970 when they had their first season, with Merrimack athletic director J Thom Lawler as the program's first head coach. They did not see much success in their first decade of existence, going through five head coaches during this period. Things changed when they hired Tony Martone in 1981. They joined the NE10 in 1984. Martone started to slowly build up the program over his first decade as coach. By the time the 1990s rolled around the Warriors started to hit their first real form of success. In 1994 they won their first regular season championship, going undefeated in conference play 9–0–0. They built off this momentum, winning three straight NE10 tournament championships from 1995 to 1997. They also won an ECAC tournament championship in 1997. Steve McAuliffe was the first player in program history to be named an all American in 1997. The program then declined a little till the 2010s, when they saw a nice stretch of success. Still under the helm of Martone, the Warriors had one of their best seasons in 2012, going 15–4–2 overall and 9–3–1 in conference play and securing their first regular season title since 1997. They lost 2–1 to SNHU in the NE10 championship, but they received an at-large bid to the NCAA tournament as the No. 16 team in the country. This marked the program's first appearance in the tournament. They beat Franklin Pierce in the first round 1–0 before falling to SNHU in the second round. They narrowly missed the tournament the following year. But in 2014 they made the NCAA tournament for a second time, with a 14–3–2 record. They beat Philadelphia University in the first round 2–0 and picked up a second-round victory over No. 10 Southern Conn. St. 1–0. In the third round they lost to LIU post 1–0. They made the tournament for a third time in 2015, going 14–3–2 overall. They won their first-round match over Le Moyne 2–1 before once again losing to SNHU in the second round. In 2016 the team made the tournament for the third year in a row, once again losing in the second round. During the 2017 season, the team went 16–3–2 and beat Bentley 2–1 in extra time to win their first NE10 tournament in 20-year, advancing to their fifth and final NCAA D2 tournament.

In 2019 Merrimack moved to Division I and joined the NEC. In their first year as a division I program, the team went 11–3–2 and a perfect 9–0 in conference play, securing a NEC regular season championship. They were not able to compete in the NEC tournament due to the NCAA transition period. Coach Martone was honored as NEC coach of the year, and Mirko Nufi was named defensive player of the year. He was also the first player in program history to be named a DI all American. The warriors would spend another 4 years in the NEC.

In 2024 the program moved to the Metro Athletic Conference.

== Coaching history ==
Years	Coach	Games	W	L	T	Pct.
1970–71	J. Thom Lawler	17	1	16	0	.059
1972–75	Mickey Quellette	47	14	27	5	.359
1976–77	Chuck Hayes	12	0	11	1	.042
1978	Mike Reynolds	14	2	11	1	.179
1979–80	Brian Fisher	26	10	16	1	.389
1981–present	Tony Martone	703	379	271	53	.577

== Player/Coaches Awards ==
NE10 Player of the year

- Joe Lococo (1989)
- Steve McAuliffe (1997)
- Robbie Sabodoz (2009)
- Francis Lemus Peña (2012)

NE10 Rookie of the year

- Steve McAuliffe (1994)

NE10 Defensive player of the year

- Dan Pearce (1988,1989)
- Steve McAuliffe (1995, 1996)
- Josue Ruiz Maya (2017)

NE10 Goalkeeper of the year

- Jose Silva (2012, 2013, 2014)
- Lucas Rezende (2017)
- Tyler Packett (2018)

NE10 Coach of the year

- Tony Martone (1987, 1994, 2002, 2012)

NEC Defensive player of the year

- Mirko Nufi (2019)

NEC Coach of the year

- Tony Martone (2019)

=== All Americans ===
- Steve McAuliffe (1997)
- Robbie Sabadoz (2009)
- Franklin Lemus Pena (2012)
- Jose Silva (2012, 2014)
- Augusto Silva (2015)
- Joseph Briers (2015)
- Lars Sund (2016)
- Josue Ruiz Maya (2017)
- Lucas Rezende (2017)
- Mirko Nufi (2019)

== Retired numbers ==
Former Merrimack Defender Steve McAuliffe number 2 was retired by the Warriors soccer team. He is the only student athlete in Merrimack history to have his number retired. He was later inducted into the NE10 hall of fame in 2012.
