= Jim Vesey =

American ice hockey player and scout

- Born: October 29, 1965 (age 60) Boston, Massachusetts, U.S.
- Height: 6 ft 2 in (188 cm)
- Weight: 205 lb (93 kg; 14 st 9 lb)
- Position: Center
- Shot: Right
- Played for: St. Louis Blues; Boston Bruins
- NHL draft: 155th overall, 1984; St. Louis Blues
- Playing career: 1988–1995

James Edward Vesey, Sr. (born October 29, 1965) is an American former ice hockey player, who currently works as a scout for the Toronto Maple Leafs. He was a Division II-III Hobey Baker award winner at Merrimack in 1988. He played 15 games in the National Hockey League (NHL) with the St. Louis Blues and Boston Bruins between 1988 and 1991. The rest of his career, which lasted from 1988 to 1995, was spent in the minor leagues. His son, Jimmy, is also an NHL player.

== Playing career ==
As a youth, he played in the 1978 Quebec International Pee-Wee Hockey Tournament with a minor ice hockey team from Boston.

He began attending Merrimack College in 1984 and played there for four years. He had an instant impact with the Merrimack Warriors, scoring 19 goals and 11 assists in his freshman year. During his sophomore year Vesey played 33 games and scored 29 goals and 33 assists, and was named an All-American for the first time, and he was also the first sophomore in program history to receive the honor. During his junior year he helped Merrimack win their first ECAC East championship, with a 58 point season with 22 goals and 36 assists, and Vesey was again named an All-American. During his senior year at Merrimack, Vesey was named team captain and played in all 40 games, helping lead the Warriors to another ECAC East title, as well as their first appearance in the NCAA Division 1 tournament in 1988. They went on to pull off a huge upset over Northeastern in the first round, before ultimately losing to eventual national champions Lake Superior in the quarterfinals. At the conclusion of the season Vesey was once again named an All-American for a third consecutive time. He was also be named the 1988 Division II-III Hobey Baker Award winner after having a 95 point season with 40 goals and 55 assists. This is still the program record for most points in a season as of 2025. Vesey left Merrimack as the program leader in both assists and point.

Drafted 155th overall by the St. Louis Blues in the 1984 NHL entry draft, Vesey went to play 11 games for the Blues, scoring a goal and two assists. He had three stints with in the Blues' International Hockey League (IHL) team the Peoria Rivermen. In the 1988–89 season, Vesey was one of the leagues top players, scoring 93 points (47 goals 46 assists), and was named to the IHL First All Star team, while also being named Peoria's team MVP. In 1989–90 Vesey scored 47 goals for the second year in a row, on top of 44 assists, and during the 1990–91 IHL season he recorded 73 points. Vesey played in 19 playoff games for Peoria that season, scoring 4 goals and 14 assists, and the Rivermen won the Turner Cup. Vesey finished with 263 points for Peoria over three seasons.

Vesey was then traded to the Winnipeg Jets to complete a February 28, 1991, trade in which Winnipeg had sent Tom Draper to St. Louis in exchange for future considerations. Vesey was sent to Winnipeg on May 24, 1991. Less than one month later, Winnipeg traded Vesey to the Boston Bruins in exchange for future considerations on June 20, 1991. He signed with Boston in 1991 and played four games for them, scoring no points.

Vesey played two seasons for the Bruins' American Hockey League (AHL) affiliate, the Providence Bruins, in his first season only appearing in 10 games. During the 1992–93 season Vesey played 71 games for Providence, achieving a 77 point season with 38 goals and 39 assists. He would end his two years in the AHL with 100 points. Vesey scored the first goal in Providence Bruins history at 4:06 of first period on October 6, 1992.

The following year Vesey returned to the IHL, signing with the Phoenix Roadrunners, scoring 30 goals and putting up 40 assists. Vesey retired after the 1994–95 season, ending his IHL career with 156 goals and 171 assists.

== Post-playing career ==
After retirement Vesey became a youth hockey coach in Middlesex County, Massachusetts. Vesey is a cancer survivor.

Vesey was inducted into the Peoria Rivermen Hall of Fame in 2002.

In 2003, Vesey was inducted into the Merrimack College Athletics Hall of Fame.

In 2015 Vesey joined the Toronto Maple Leafs organization as a scout.

== Personal life ==
Vesey was born in Boston, Massachusetts and raised in the Charlestown neighborhood, and attended Christopher Columbus High School. During is time at Merrimack he majored in sociology.

His elder son, Jimmy Vesey, was selected 66th overall by the Nashville Predators in the 2012 NHL entry draft and has played in the NHL for 11 seasons. A younger son, Nolan, played for the University of Maine and was drafted by the Toronto Maple Leafs in 2014.

== Career statistics ==
=== Regular season and playoffs ===
			Regular season					Playoffs
Season	Team	League	GP	G	A	Pts	PIM	GP	G	A	Pts	PIM
1982–83	Christopher Columbus High School	HS-MA	—	29	36	65	—	—	—	—	—	—
1983–84	Christopher Columbus High School	HS-MA	21	39	48	87	—	—	—	—	—	—
1984–85	Merrimack College	ECAC 2	33	19	11	30	28	—	—	—	—	—
1985–86	Merrimack College	ECAC 2	32	29	32	61	67	—	—	—	—	—
1986–87	Merrimack College	ECAC 2	35	22	36	58	57	—	—	—	—	—
1987–88	Merrimack College	ECAC 2	40	40	55	95	95	—	—	—	—	—
1988–89	St. Louis Blues	NHL	5	1	1	2	7	—	—	—	—	—
1988–89	Peoria Rivermen	IHL	76	47	46	93	137	4	1	2	3	6
1989–90	St. Louis Blues	NHL	6	0	1	1	0	—	—	—	—	—
1989–90	Peoria Rivermen	IHL	60	47	44	91	75	5	1	3	4	21
1990–91	Peoria Rivermen	IHL	58	32	41	73	69	19	4	14	18	26
1991–92	Boston Bruins	NHL	4	0	0	0	0	—	—	—	—	—
1991–92	Maine Mariners	AHL	10	6	7	13	13	—	—	—	—	—
1992–93	Providence Bruins	AHL	71	38	39	77	42	6	2	5	7	4
1993–94	Phoenix Roadrunners	IHL	60	20	30	50	75	—	—	—	—	—
1994–95	Phoenix Roadrunners	IHL	41	10	10	20	62	—	—	—	—	—
IHL totals			295	156	171	327	418	28	6	19	25	53
NHL totals			15	1	2	3	7	—	—	—	—	—

== Awards and honors ==
Award	Year
College
Merrimack Rookie of the year	1984–85
Merrimack MVP (2x)	1985-86, 1987-88
ECAC East Champion (2x)	1986-87, 1987-88
AHCA First Team All American (2x)	1985-86, 1987-88
AHCA Second Team All American	1986-87
New England Hockey All Star first team (3x)	1985-86, 1986-87, 1987-88
ECAC East All-Star First Team (3x)	1985-86, 1986-87, 1987-88
Division II-III Hobey Baker award	1987–88
Merrimack athletics hall of fame	2003
IHL
IHL All-Star First Team	1988-89
Peoria Rivermen MVP	1988-89
Turner Cup champion	1990–91
Peoria Rivermen Hall of Fame	2002

== Records ==
Merrimack College

- All time points leader (244)
- All time assists leader (134)
- Most points in a season (95) 1987–88
- Most assists in a season (55) 1987–88
- most career power-play goals (34, shares record)
