= Jim Hrivnak =

Canadian ice hockey player (born 1968)

- Born: May 28, 1968 (age 58) Montreal, Quebec, Canada
- Height: 6 ft 2 in (188 cm)
- Weight: 185 lb (84 kg; 13 st 3 lb)
- Position: Goaltender
- Caught: Left
- Played for: Washington Capitals; Winnipeg Jets; St. Louis Blues; Kölner Haie; Manchester Storm; Ässät
- NHL draft: 61st overall, 1986; Washington Capitals
- Playing career: 1989–2001; 2003–2004

Jim Hrivnak (born May 28, 1968) is a Canadian former professional ice hockey goaltender, who played parts of five seasons in the National Hockey League (NHL). Selected by the Washington Capitals in the 1986 NHL entry draft, Hrivnak played parts of four seasons with the Capitals before joining the Winnipeg Jets and later, the St. Louis Blues.

== Playing career ==
Hrivnak played for Merrimack College from 1985 to 1989. During his freshman year he had a 12-6 record, and was named ECAC east rookie of the year. Hrivnak had a great sophomore year and played every game for the Warriors, going 27-7 overall, leading Merrimack to their first ECAC East championship. He had a shutout in the championship game, leading to him being named finals MVP. Hrivnak was also named 1987 ECAC East league MVP and was honored as an All-American. During his junior year in the 1987-88 season he had a program-record 31 wins as he and Merrimack won another ECAC East championship. Merrimack then made their first appearance in the Division I NCAA tournament. Hrivnak was in net as Merrimack pulled off a huge first round upset of Hockey East champions Northeastern, before eventually falling in the quarterfinals. He once again was named an All-American at the end of the season. His senior year he went 18-4, and finished his time at Merrimack with a 88-23-2 record. Hrivnak still holds numerous records at Merrimack including most shutouts in a season, most overall shutouts and most wins.

Following his graduation, Hrivnak played with the Washington Capitals' American Hockey League (AHL) affiliate, the Baltimore Skipjacks, to conclude their 1988–89 season.

Hrivnak made his NHL debut on December 6, 1989, against the Pittsburgh Penguins and stopped one shot. From 1989 to 1992 he played 32 games for the Capitals, going 15-10-1. During the 1992-93 season he played 27 games for the Capitals, with a 13-9-2 record. On March 22, 1993, Hrivnak was traded by Washington to the Winnipeg Jets for Rick Tabaracci. He started three games for the Jets, going 2-1.

On July 29, 1993, Hrivnak was traded to the St. Louis Blues in exchange for a seventh round draft pick. He played 23 games with the Blues, going 4-10 overall. During the 1993–94 season, he set a new record for most saves by a Blues goaltender with 46, against the Boston Bruins. This turned out to be his final year in the NHL, and he finished with an overall record of 34-30-3.

Hrivnak then joined Milwaukee Admirals of the International Hockey League (IHL), playing in 28 games and going 17-10-1. After bouncing around a couple of teams in the IHL and AHL, he signed with the Las Vegas Thunder in 1995, playing in 13 games going 10-1-1. This was his final season in America, and in 1996 he signed with Kölner Haie of the Deutsche Eishockey Liga playing in 21 games. He then signed with the Manchester Storm of the Ice Hockey Superleague, playing in 21 games. In 1998 he joined the Hamburg Crocodiles of Germany2, playing 35 games and going 11-14-2. Hrivnak joined Ässät in the Finnish league Liiga to compete in their 1999–2000 season, and layed 34 games in two seasons with them. On October 28, 2003, Hrivnak joined the Granby Prédateurs of the Quebec Senior Major Hockey League. He retired after the 2003-04 season.

In 2018, Hrivnak was inducted into the Merrimack College Athletics Hall of Fame.

== Career statistics ==
=== Regular season and playoffs ===
			Regular season									Playoffs
Season	Team	League	GP	W	L	T	MIN	GA	SO	GAA	SV%	GP	W	L	MIN	GA	SO	GAA	SV%
1983–84	Montreal Concordia	QMAAA	15	6	8	1	897	68	0	4.54	—	4	2	2	264	14	0	3.18	—
1984–85	Montreal Concordia	QMAAA	34	8	22	1	1822	182	0	5.99	—	9	3	6	499	62	0	7.45	—
1985–86	Merrimack College	ECAC East	21	12	6	2	1230	75	0	3.66	.864	—	—	—	—	—	—	—	—
1986–87	Merrimack College	ECAC East	34	27	7	0	1950	80	3	2.46	—	—	—	—	—	—	—	—	—
1987–88	Merrimack College	ECAC East	37	31	6	0	2119	84	4	2.38	—	—	—	—	—	—	—	—	—
1988–89	Merrimack College	ECAC East	22	18	4	0	1295	52	4	2.41	—	—	—	—	—	—	—	—	—
1988–89	Baltimore Skipjacks	AHL	10	1	8	0	502	55	0	6.57	.834	—	—	—	—	—	—	—	—
1989–90	Washington Capitals	NHL	11	5	5	0	609	36	0	3.55	.876	—	—	—	—	—	—	—	—
1989–90	Baltimore Skipjacks	AHL	47	24	19	2	2722	139	4	3.06	.885	6	4	2	360	19	0	3.17	—
1990–91	Washington Capitals	NHL	9	4	2	1	432	26	0	3.61	.885	—	—	—	—	—	—	—	—
1990–91	Baltimore Skipjacks	AHL	42	20	16	6	2481	134	1	3.24	.886	6	2	3	324	21	0	3.89	—
1991–92	Washington Capitals	NHL	12	6	3	0	605	35	0	3.47	.872	—	—	—	—	—	—	—	—
1991–92	Baltimore Skipjacks	AHL	22	10	8	3	1303	73	0	3.36	.893	—	—	—	—	—	—	—	—
1992–93	Washington Capitals	NHL	27	13	9	2	1421	83	0	3.50	.877	—	—	—	—	—	—	—	—
1992–93	Winnipeg Jets	NHL	3	2	1	0	180	13	0	4.34	.865	—	—	—	—	—	—	—	—
1993–94	St. Louis Blues	NHL	23	4	10	0	970	69	0	4.27	.877	—	—	—	—	—	—	—	—
1994–95	Milwaukee Admirals	IHL	28	17	10	1	1634	106	0	3.89	.879	—	—	—	—	—	—	—	—
1994–95	Kansas City Blades	IHL	10	3	5	2	550	35	0	3.81	.884	2	0	2	118	7	0	3.55	.870
1995–96	Carolina Monarchs	AHL	11	1	4	1	458	27	0	3.54	.898	—	—	—	—	—	—	—	—
1995–96	Las Vegas Thunder	IHL	13	10	1	1	713	34	0	2.86	.897	—	—	—	—	—	—	—	—
1995–96	Kansas City Blades	IHL	4	1	1	0	154	11	0	4.29	.863	—	—	—	—	—	—	—	—
1996–97	Kölner Haie	DEL	21	—	—	—	1145	53	1	2.78	.899	2	—	—	122	7	0	3.45	.887
1997–98	Manchester Storm	BISL	24	—	—	—	1487	62	—	2.50	.913	—	—	—	—	—	—	—	—
1998–99	Hamburg Crocodiles	GER-2	35	11	14	2	1918	119	4	3.72	.899	—	—	—	—	—	—	—	—
1999–00	Ässät	FIN	24	6	12	5	1410	74	1	3.15	.913	—	—	—	—	—	—	—	—
2000–01	Ässät	FIN	10	0	8	2	608	47	0	4.64	.867	—	—	—	—	—	—	—	—
2003–04	Granby Predateurs	QSMHL	9	—	—	—	—	—	—	6.16	.824	—	—	—	—	—	—	—	—
NHL totals			85	34	30	3	4217	262	0	3.73	.877	—	—	—	—	—	—	—	—

== Awards and honors ==
Award	Year
College
Merrimack Rookie of the year	1985-86
ECAC rookie of the year	1985-86
ECAC East champion	1986-87
Merrimack team MVP	1986-87
ECAC East finals MVP	1986-87
ECAC East league MVP	1986-87
ACHA All American	1986-86
ECAC East champion	1987-88
ECAC East finals MVP	1987-88
Merrimack Co team MVP	1987-88
New England college D2 all star	1987-88
ACHA All American	1987-88
Post Retimerment
Merrimack athletics Hall of Fame	2018

== Records ==
Merrimack College

- Most wins career (88)
- Most wins in a season (31)
- Most shutouts career (11)
