= Jim Reynolds (ice hockey) =

American ice hockey player and coach

Biographical details
- Born: Quincy, Massachusetts, U.S.
- Died: June 28, 2021 (age 93)

Playing career
- 1947–1948: Boston Olympics
- 1948-1949: Providence Scarlets

Coaching career (HC unless noted)
- 1956–1964: Merrimack

Head coaching record
- Overall: 46-45-3 (.505)

Accomplishments and honors

Awards
- Merrimack athletics hall of fame (1985)

Jim Reynolds was an American ice hockey player and coach who served as the inaugural head coach for Merrimack.

== Playing career ==
Reynolds grew up in Quincy Massachusetts graduating from BC high school. He would later play for the Boston Olympics in 1947 and the Providence scarlets in 1948.

== Coaching career ==
Reynolds attended Merrimack college and was part of the first graduating class in 1951. Just a couple years later in 1956 the Merrimack hockey team were on the Verge of their first official season. So Reynolds was offered the job as the programs first ever head coach. After a 0-2 start during the programs inaugural season. Reynolds led the warriors to the first victory in program history with a 13-6 win over assumption university. He would go on to finish that season 4-4-1. The following year Reynolds would lead Merrimack to their first ever winning season when they would go 6-3-2. Following up with a 7-5 record the next season. After 2 losing seasons Merrimack would join ECAC Hockey conference during the 1961–62 season. The conference consisted of 29 other teams in the Northeast. The warriors would go 7-6 that year finishing 13th in the conference standings. Following another 13th place finish the year after. Reynolds would lead Merrimack to a career best 8 wins during the 1963–64 season. He would then step down as head coach at the end of the season. Being replaced by Ron Ryan.

For his contributions and help starting the Merrimack hockey program. He was later inducted into the Merrimack athletics hall of fame 1985.

Later life

After stepping down as the Merrimack coach, he served as Attorney in Quincy for over 50 years before retiring. He was married to his wife Maureen, he had 2 children and 4 grandchildren.

== Head coaching record ==
Season	Team	Overall	Conference	Postseason
1956-57	Merrimack Warriors	4-4-1	0-0	
1957-58	Merrimack Warriors	6-3-2	0-0	
1958-59	Merrimack Warriors	7-5	0-0	
1959-60	Merrimack Warriors	3-6	0-0	
1960-61	Merrimack Warriors	5-7	0-0	
1961-62	Merrimack Warriors	7-6	0-0	
1962-63	Merrimack Warriors	6-7	0-0	
1963-64	Merrimack Warriors	8-7	0-0	
	Merrimack	46-45-3		
	Total	46-46-3		
