= Ben Brar =

- Born: November 19, 1998 (age 27) Abbotsford, British Columbia
- Height: 6 ft 2 in (188 cm)
- Weight: 194 lb (88 kg; 13 st 12 lb)
- Position: Left wing
- Shoots: Left
- ECHL team: Florida Everblades
- NHL draft: Undrafted
- Playing career: 2024–present

Ben Brar (born November 19, 1998) is a Canadian ice hockey player. He is the former captain for Merrimack. He currently plays for the Florida Everblades of the ECHL.

== Career ==
Brar played 6 years of junior hockey in the BCHL. He spent his last 3 seasons of junior hockey with the Prince George Spruce Kings, where he would tally 79 goals and 64 assists. In his final year with the team during the 2018-19 season he won the Doyle Cup. On top of this, he won the fan favorite award and shared the most inspirational player award with captain Ben Poisson.

Brar then attended Merrimack College. His freshman year he appeared in 32 games accumulating 10 points. He put up 28 points between his sophomore and junior year. After being named Captain his Senior year he had a collegiate high 26 points with 14 goals and 12 assists leading Merrimack to the 2023 NCAA tournament. At the end of the season Brar was named the NEHWA John Tomasello Unsung Hero Award winner. Brar would play a 5th season with Merrimack as a graduate student. During this season he would break the Merrimack record for most games played throughout a career.

After graduating he signed with the Florida Everblades where he won the Kelly cup during the 2023-24 season.

== Career statistics ==
Season	Team	Lge	GP	G	A	Pts	PIM	+/-	GP	G	A	Pts	PIM
2014-15	Cowichan Valley Capitals	BCHL	1	0	0	0	2		--	--	--	--	--
2015-16	Penticton Vees	BCHL	55	4	5	9	17		6	0	0	0	2
2016-17	Penticton Vees	BCHL	21	2	2	4	4		--	--	--	--	--
2016-17	Prince George Spruce Kings	BCHL	35	19	9	28	16		6	3	2	5	2
2017-18	Prince George Spruce Kings	BCHL	57	25	29	54	30		24	8	10	18	30
2018-19	Prince George Spruce Kings	BCHL	57	35	26	61	40		17	5	6	11	18
2019-20	Merrimack College	Hockey east	32	5	5	10	15	-14					
2020-21	Merrimack College	Hockey east	15	4	4	8	10	0					
2021-22	Merrimack College	Hockey east	35	11	9	20	20	3					
2022-23	Merrimack College	Hockey east	38	14	12	26	39	10					
2023-24	Merrimack College	Hockey east	35	5	14	19	20	-18					
2023-24	Florida Everblades	ECHL	5	0	2	2	0	-1	7	0	1	1	6
2024-25	Florida Everblades	ECHL	42	9	5	14	12	9					

== Awards and honors ==
- BCHL: Doyle Cup Champion, 2018–19
- College: NEHWA John Tomasello Unsung Hero Award, 2022–23
- ECHL: Kelly Cup, 2023–24
