= Rejean Stringer =

Canadian ice hockey player

- Born: August 21, 1974 (age 51) Gravelbourg, Saskatchewan
- Height: 5 ft 10 in (178 cm)
- Weight: 185 lb (84 kg; 13 st 3 lb)
- Position: Forward
- Played for: Cardiff Devils (EIHL); Peoria Rivermen (ECHL); Las Vegas Wranglers (ECHL); Salzburg (Aust-2); Columbia Inferno (ECHL); Fresno Falcons (WCHL); New Orleans Brass (ECHL); Kentucky Thoroughblades (AHL); Merrimack Warriors (HE)
- NHL draft: Undrafted
- Playing career: 1999–2006

Rejean Stringer (pronounced Ray-zhawn, Stron-zhay) (born August 21, 1974) is a Canadian former professional ice hockey forward who played most of his career in the ECHL.

== Early life and education ==
Stringer was raised in Gravelbourg, Saskatchewan where he began playing hockey at a very young age in a backyard rink. Stringer left home in tenth grade to play for a team in a stronger league. He attended Merrimack College from 1995 to 1999. He led the team in goals scored in the 1996–97 season and led the team in overall scoring the next two years. During his junior year In the 1997–98 season he would have a collegiate high 57 points. Leading the nation in assists with 46. That year he scored seven points in Merrimack's upset series victory over top seed Boston University in the Hockey East playoffs. During his senior year In 1999 he was named team captain. He would go on to score 17 goals and 39 assists leading to him being named to the Hockey East All-Star team. As well as being the first player in program history to be named a DI All American. He would be named team MVP both his junior and senior year. He is arguably one of the best players in program history in the D1 era.

== Professional career ==
After leaving Merrimack, Stringer played for the Kentucky Thoroughblades of the AHL and the New Orleans Brass of the ECHL in the 1999–2000 season. The next year, he moved to the Fresno Falcons of the now-defunct WCHL. He would tally 20 goals and 43 assists with his one season in Fresno. He would then play for the Columbia Inferno of the ECHL for 2 seasons from 2001 to 2003. In his first year with the Inferno he would score 14 goals and tally 43 assists in 57 games. Then during his second year in the 2002-03 season he would make the 2002 ECHL all-star team in after having a 95 point season. He then spent the 2003–04 season in playing for Salzburg in Austria having a impressive 86 point season with 38 goals and 48 assists in just 38 games. Stringer then returned to ECHL for the 2004–05 season, playing for the Las Vegas Wranglers before being sent to the Peoria Rivermen due to the Wranglers' salary cap issues. The next year he briefly played for the Cardiff Devils of the EIHL before retiring from professional hockey. While in Cardiff, Stringer scored the final goal in the last game that the Devils played at Wales National Ice Rink.

He currently works as an investment advisor for RBC Dominion Securities in his hometown of Gravelbourg.

== Career statistics ==
			Regular season					Playoffs
Season	Team	League	GP	G	A	Pts	PIM	GP	G	A	Pts	PIM
1995–96	Merrimack College	HE	32	8	8	16	16	—	—	—	—	—
1996–97	Merrimack College	HE	34	18	18	36	14	—	—	—	—	—
1997–98	Merrimack College	HE	38	11	46	57	44	—	—	—	—	—
1998–99	Merrimack College	HE	36	17	39	56	44	—	—	—	—	—
1999–2000	Kentucky Thoroughblades	AHL	40	6	13	19	12	2	0	0	0	0
1999–2000	New Orleans Brass	ECHL	30	6	13	19	6	3	0	0	0	0
2000–01	Fresno Falcons	WCHL	71	20	43	63	6	5	3	4	7	4
2001–02	Columbia Inferno	ECHL	58	14	43	57	10	5	1	3	4	0
2002–03	Columbia Inferno	ECHL	72	37	59	96	16	17	3	14	17	12
2003–04	Salzburg	Aust-2	37	38	48	86	32	—	—	—	—	—
2004–05	Las Vegas Wranglers	ECHL	19	3	11	14	0	—	—	—	—	—
2004–05	Peoria Rivermen	ECHL	53	16	20	36	12	—	—	—	—	—
2005–06	Cardiff Devils	EIHL	4	2	2	4	0	—	—	—	—	—
ECHL totals			232	76	146	222	44	25	4	17	21	12

== Awards and honours ==
Award	Year
Merrimack team MVP	1997-98 1998-99
All-Hockey East Second Team	1998–99
AHCA East Second-Team All-American	1998–99
ECHL all star team	2002–03
