= Merrimack Warriors men's ice hockey =

- Current season
- University: Merrimack College
- Conference: Hockey East
- Head coach: Scott Borek; 8th season, 89–124–12 (.422)
- Assistant coaches: Dan Jewell; Ryan Durocher
- Arena: J. Thom Lawler Rink; North Andover, Massachusetts
- Colors: Blue and gold

NCAA tournament champions
- DII: 1978

NCAA tournament runner-up
- DII: 1984

NCAA tournament Frozen Four
- DII: 1978, 1980, 1982, 1984

NCAA tournament appearances
- DI: 1988, 2011, 2023, 2026; DII: 1978, 1980, 1982, 1984

Conference tournament champions
- ECAC 2: 1967, 1968, 1977, 1980; ECAC East: 1987, 1988, 1989; Hockey East: 2026

Conference regular season champions
- ECAC 2: 1968, 1969, 1975, 1976, 1977; ECAC East: 1987, 1988, 1989

Current uniform
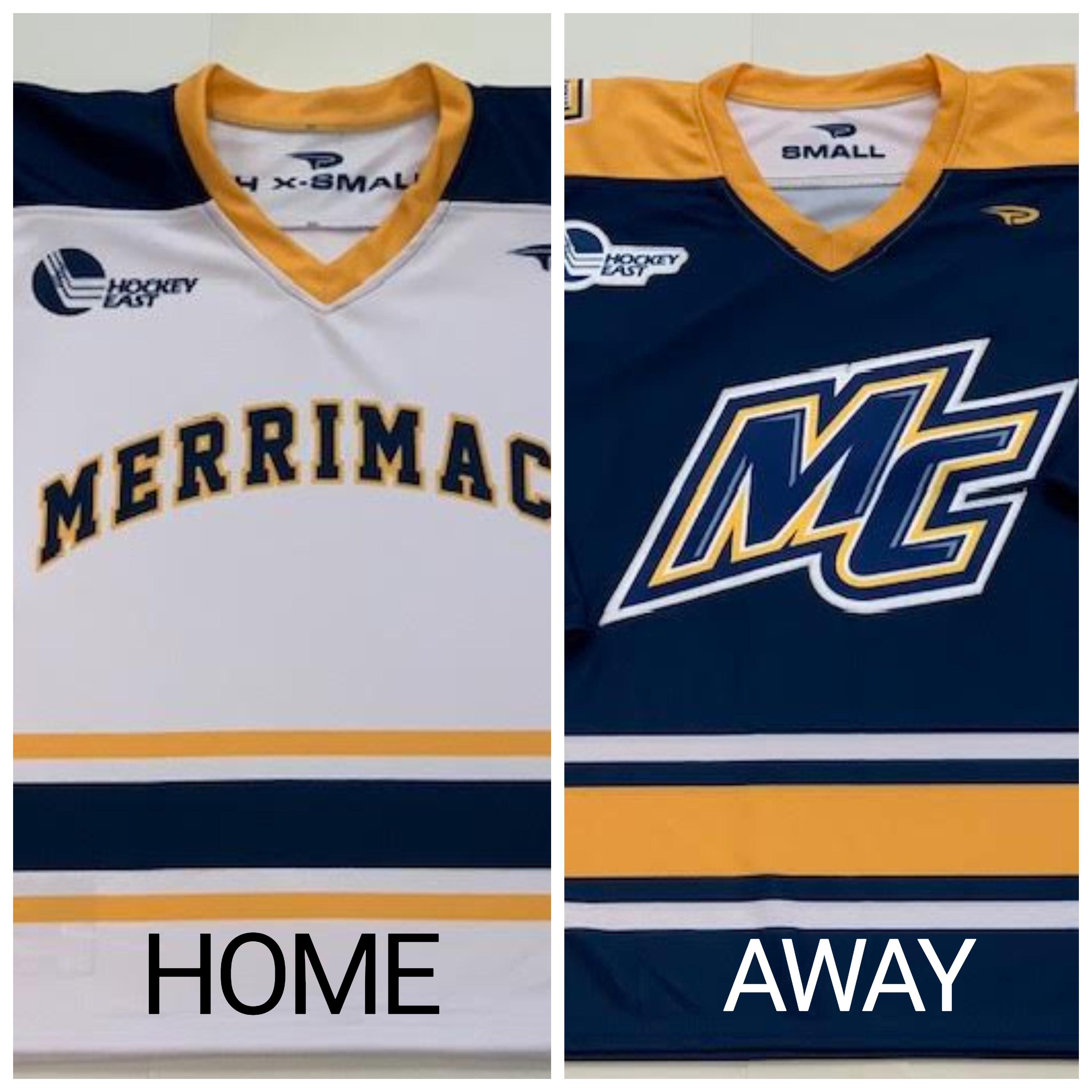

The Merrimack Warriors men's ice hockey team is a National Collegiate Athletic Association (NCAA) Division I college ice hockey program that represents Merrimack College. The Warriors are a member of Hockey East. They play at the 2,549-seat J. Thom Lawler Rink in North Andover, Massachusetts, which underwent renovation in 2010. Merrimack's 92.08% capacity during the 2013–14 season was second in Hockey East.

== History ==
=== Early years (1948-1964) ===
The history of hockey at Merrimack started out just a year after the college was founded in 1947, a group of students banded together and formed an informal club they called the "Blue Blades". The Blades rented ice off Merrimack's one-building campus for $30 an hour and played anybody who would agree to a date, time and place The Warriors started. The program gained some instant credibility in 1953 when then President Father Vincent McQuade appointed Father Paul Thabault, recognized as the father of Merrimack hockey, as a moderator/coach of the team. John Twomey '56, an instrumental figure in organizing the program that year, would later serve as captain under Thabault for two seasons. Father Thabault and his skaters constructed Merrimack's first home rink - an outdoor model - and made ice with the help of a fire hose on the North Andover campus in 1954. intercollegiate play began in 1954–55, as the college offered more support to the program in the form of a modest budget, new uniforms and varsity letters. Babson, Worcester Polytechnic Institute and Keene Teachers were among the first intercollegiate competition Merrimack hockey faced that year. And for the first time, the college recognized hockey as a varsity sport. The program took another leap forward in 1956 when Jim Reynolds was hired as its official coach. At that time, statistics and records started to be recorded. The warriors first official season would come be in 1956–57. After a 0–2 start the warriors would pick up the first victory in program history with a 13–6 win over assumption university they would finish the year with a 4-4-1 record showing that they could compete with other local schools. The following year they would have their first winning season going 6–3–2. The warriors would be an independent until 1961. This would change when they would join the ECAC conference as one of the founding members. Reynolds would go on to lead the warriors for another 3 years in. But after the leading the warriors to an 8–7 record in 1964 he decided to step down as head coach. In the 1964 as the ECAC downsized in members. The warriors would move to the ECAC 2 conference and Ron Ryan would be hired as the second head coach in program history. Ryan would leave after just one season.

=== J Thom Lawler era (1964-1978) ===
J Thom Lawler, who at the time was an assistant athletic director at Merrimack college, would take over as the program's new head coach. From there Lawler would lead the warriors to great success in the late 1960s. In just his first year he would take the warriors to the ECAC 2 tournament for the first time in program history. They would knock off the 1 seed AIC in the first round 4–1. Before eventually losing to Colby in the championship game. The warriors would build off this going into the next season though. As in just his second year during the 1966–67 season Lawler and the warriors would qualify for the ECAC 2 tournament for the second time as the 4th seed going 13–9 overall. But they would not stop here as they would knock off the 1 seed Norwich 12–3. This would punch their ticket to the championship game Vs Colby for the second year in a row. But this time warriors would go on to win the game 6-4 winning the first championship in program history. The warriors would one up this the following year during the 1967–68 season by going 12–1 in conference play and 18–8 overall securing their first regular season championship. As the 1 seed the warriors would blow out AIC 6–1 in the semifinals. They would then go on to beat Hamilton 5-4 winning back to back ECAC championships. Then the following year during the 1968–69 season they would then win a second straight regular season title the following year going 7–2 in conference before eventually losing to Norwich 5–3 in the semifinals. At the begging of the new decade the warriors would then decline for a few seasons before turning into a power house in the mid and late 70s. Still led by coach J Thom Lawler from 1973 to 1978 they had 5 straight seasons of 20 or more wins. They would also have a dominant conference record of 78-14-4 during this period. This resulted in back to back ECAC 2 regular season titles in 1975 and 1976 as well as being tournament runners up in 1974 and 1976. Then during the 1976–77 season the warriors would go 23-11-3 overall and 20-2-1 in conference play. Securing their 3rd straight regular season championship. When the conference tournament rolled around they would beat Elmira in Quarterfinals 5–1. They would then face UMass Lowell in the Semifinals beating them 6–2. Then moving on to face Union in the championship and beating them 6–4 to win their 3rd ECAC tournament championship. During this time Lawler would also be the first coach in program history to hit the 100 win mark, and Defenceman Mark Petit would be the first player in program history to honored as an all American. The following year during the 1977-78 the NCAA would institute a division II national championship. The warriors would go 21-9-2 that year and be invited to the inaugural tournament. They would play Mankato State in the semifinals beating them fairly easily 6–1. They would then go on to destroy Lake Forest 12–2 in the championship game to win the 1978 division II national title. Warriors player Jim Toomey would be named the tournament mosts outstanding player. This would be a historic moment for the program and Merrimack college as a whole. As it was the first national championship in school history.

Tragically just two months after winning the national championship head coach Lawler died after suffering from a heart attack. After his untimely death Lawler was honored for his accomplishments and dedication to the program. As in 2003 Merrimack would rename their home rink in his honor. His son Tom Lawler was a freshman at Merrimack when J. Thom died. He completed his four years at the college, being named captain in his senior year he would end up finishing his time with the warriors top 5 in career points.

Bob Magnuson would be the first player in program history to be selected in the NHL entry draft in 1978.

=== Bruce Parker years (1978-1983) ===
Bruce Parker was named as the new head coach after Lawler's passing. Parker would pick off where Lawler left off leading the Warriors to 4 straight winning seasons from 1978 to 1982. In just his first year he would lead the Warriors to a 24-10-1 record but they would lose the ECAC 2 semifinals. The following year during the 1979–80 season the Warriors would have another 20 win season going 22–13–2. They would run the gauntlet in the ECAC tournament that year eventually beating UMass Lowell 4–0 to win their 4th tournament championship. This would punch the Warriors second trip to the 1980 NCAA D2 tournament. Where they would lose to Elmira 4–1 in the frozen four. Tom Lawler would finish that season as a Division II Hobey Baker finalist. During the 1981–82 season the NCAA would expand the D2 tournament. The Warriors would go 20-15-1 in the regular season and get an at large bid to the 1982 NCAA D2 tournament. Making their third appearance. The Warriors would beat Mankato State on aggregate 11–7 in the first round securing their 3rd frozen four appearance where they would play rival UMass Lowell and lose 4–3. Parker would leave after the 1982–83 season.

=== Ron Anderson era (1983-1998) ===
From there assistant Coach Ron Anderson would be promoted to head coach taking over the program during the 1983–84 season. In just his first year he took the warriors all the way to the 1984 Division II national championship. Beating SNHU on aggregate 9–7 in the frozen four before ultimately becoming runners up to Bemidji State in the championship game. For the next 5 seasons the Warriors became a concurrent NCAA Division I independent and a ECAC East member. During this time the Warriors saw even more success. After a 19-12-2 season in 1985–86, the Warriors would hit a 3-year streak of dominance. Winning 3 straight ECAC East regular season and conference championships in 1987, 1988 and 1989. During the 1986-87 the Warriors would go 22–2 in conference play and 29–7 overall. They would play UConn in the first round and beat them 6–2. They would then beat Norwich 3–2 in the semis. Punching their first ticket to ECAC East championship which they would win 3–0 over babson. Goalie Jim Hriviak would be named league MVP closing out one of the best years in program history. But the Warriors would find a way to one up this the following year. During the 1987–1988 season they would go on to have a perfect 22–0 conference record and would once again win the ECAC tournament, beating Bowdoin 4–1. Finishing the regular season with a 32–4 record. This led to them getting their first ever bid at the NCAA DI Tournament in 1988. This was the first time an Independent program had been invited to the tournament since 1960. The warriors faced the Hockey East champions Northeastern in the first round. They lost the first game 5-3 but routed the Huskies in the second game 7-3 which gave them the series win 10–7 on aggregate pulling off a huge upset. The Warriors went on to play Lake Superior in the quarterfinals where their season ultimately came to an end as they as they lost on aggregate 8-5. This was the deepest run the Warriors have made in the D1 tournament. The Warriors would finish the year with a program best 34–6 record. Warriors player Jimmy Vesey was named Division II-III Hobey Baker Award winner in 1988 after having a program record 95 point season with 40 goals and 55 assists capping of a historic year for the program. Then once again during the 1988–89 season Anderson would lead Merrimack to another terrific season going 27–7 overall and 14–2 in conference. They would get a first round bye in the ECAC tournament and would easily take care of Massachusetts–Boston in the semis 12–1. They would once again face Bowdoin in the championship game and beat them 9–4 completing the three peat. During this period the warriors would go 66–4 in conference and 90–20 overall. Closing out their time as an ECAC East member and a D1 independent on a high note. Merrimack did not play a schedule against predominantly Division I teams until they joined the Hockey East conference in 1989.

==== Transition to hockey east ====
Still led by Coach Ron Anderson, a new era began for Merrimack hockey. As they would become a full division I member in 1989 when the Warriors competed in their first season as a member of the Hockey East Association. That team posted an overall record of 10–24–1, but pulled off the surprise of the season by taking eventual league champion Boston College to a third and decisive playoff game. After being picked for the bottom part of the league in three of the last four seasons, the Warriors continued to baffle the experts by battling for home-ice advantage all season long while defeating several Top 20 teams. And with the roots of the Merrimack hockey tree that were planted in Hockey East seven years earlier firmly entrenched, the 1996–97 Warriors entered a new chapter in history by qualifying for a Hockey East playoff home ice berth. This would lead to Coach Anderson being named Clark Hodder coach of the year after the 1996–97 season becoming the first coach in program history to be given the honor. The 1997–98 team raised the bar a little higher by pulling off a massive upset over top-ranked Boston University in the hockey east quarterfinals and earning a trip to the conference semifinals at Boston's FleetCenter for the first time in program history. After losing to Boston College in the semis Anderson's contract would not be renewed at the end of the 1997–1998 season, putting an end to his nearly 2 decade long tenure with the program. Anderson would finish his time with the Warriors as the all-time program wins leader with 254 victories. This record still stands to this day (as of 2025).

=== Chris Serino years (1998-2005) ===
The 1998–99 season began yet another era in Merrimack hockey history with the dawning of the Serino age. On April 24, 1998, Chris Serino became just the sixth head coach in the program's history. The Warriors posted a mark of 11–24–1 in Serino's inaugural campaign, and senior forward and captain Rejean Stringer was named an All-American, Merrimack's first ever at the Division I level. In Serino's second season, the Warriors set an NCAA record for consecutive overtime contests by playing in six straight at the end of January, and in 2000–01, the Warriors notched 14 victories, the most for Merrimack since 1996–97. Several of those victories were over nationally ranked opponents. In 2002–03, senior goaltender and captain Joe Exter led Merrimack to a surprising race for home ice throughout much of the season, including the team's first-ever regular season Division I tournament title with wins over host Rensselaer and Wayne State at the 52nd Annual Rensselaer/HSBC Holiday Hockey Tournament in late December. Exter was selected to the All-Hockey East Team by league coaches. As well as being given the Hockey East 3 stars award. Long-time assistant coach Stu Irving was also honored, as the American Hockey Coaches Association presented him with its Terry Flanagan Memorial Award in recognition of an assistant coach's career body of work. The season also saw the inauguration of the Blue Line Club, the program's official support organization.

=== Mark Dennehy era (2005-2018) ===
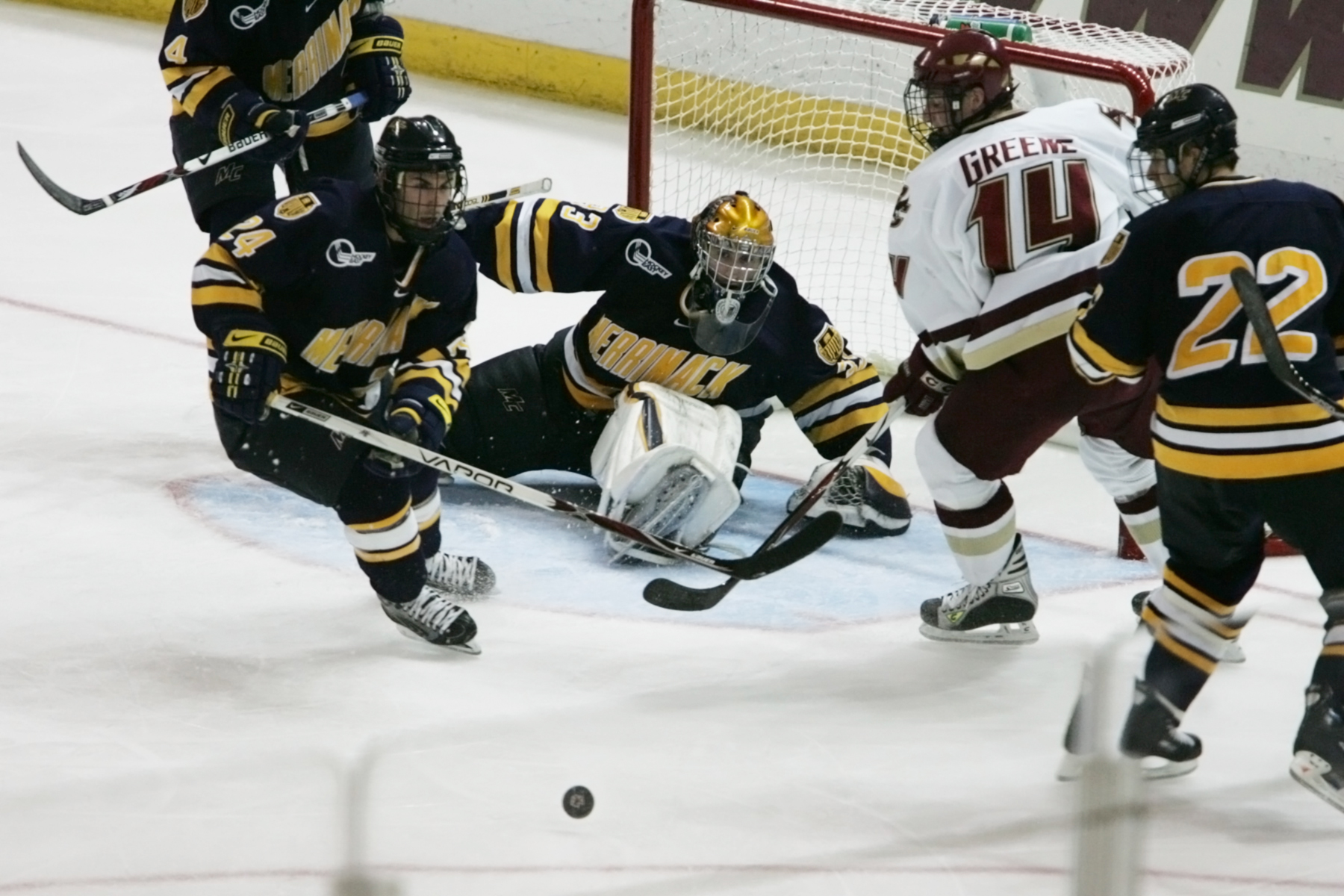
Merrimack vs. Boston College in 2007

After the 2004–05 season Merrimack hockey was in a very bad spot. Unconfirmed reports at the time asserted that the players on the team had asked Serino to resign as head coach which he would ultimately do at the end of the season. Then at the time Merrimack president Richard Santagati was even publicly questioning the teams viability as a hockey east program. Mark Dennehy would then be named as the 7th head coach in team history before the 2005–06 season. The program struggled in the highly competitive Hockey East. The 2006–07 season, in which they won only 3 games, was the nadir of their struggles. Behind the scenes there were even more problems. The school named a new president and they were barely putting any money into the program. Coach Dennehy would take matters into his own hands as he fought vigorously for his program on top of recruiting and building a roster. He was also having numerous meetings with administration trying to convince them why Hockey East and Division I was best for the program. Dennehy's hard work and commitment to the team would start to pay off as during the 2009–10 season the Warriors showed some improvement going 16–19–2. Dennehy would also be named Hockey East coach of the year at the end of that season, becoming the first coach in program history to receive the honor. Player Stéphane Da Costa would also win the Tim Taylor award after scoring 16 goals and having 29 assists. Then the following year during the 2010–11 season, they had one of the best seasons in years. Having unprecedented success against several of the nation's top teams. They finished the regular season 22–8–4 and were ranked 9th in the nation. Merrimack gained home ice advantage for the first round for the first time since 1997. The warriors would sweep Maine in the quarterfinals in best 2 out of 3 series, securing their first appearance at the TD Garden since 1998. They would then beat UNH 4–1 in the Semifinals, punching their first ever appearance in the Hockey East championship game, where they would ultimately fall to Boston College 5–3. The Warriors would finish the season as the No. 10 team in the country and get an at large bid to the 2011 NCAA tournament. This would be the Warriors first appearance in the tournament since 1988. They would face Notre Dame in the first round and lose 4–3 in overtime. Dennehy would be named Clark Hodder coach of the year for the second year in a row at the end of the season.

The program received its first No. 1 ranking in the USCHO Poll during the 2011–12 season.

The Warriors would go 18-12-7 during the 2011–12 season and finish the season ranked as the No. 17 team in the country, just narrowly missing the NCAA tournament. 2012 would mark the last year of Warrior's goalie Joe Cannata. He would end his tenure with 59 wins, the most in program history in the Hockey East era. After this year the Warriors would then regress for the next handful of seasons.

During the 2016–17 season the Warriors would go 15–16–6. Goaltender Collin Delia would lead Hockey East in GAA. This would lead to him being the first goalie in program history to be named Hockey East goaltending champion. Mark Dennehy was fired as the team's head coach at the conclusion of the 2017–18 season following a 12–21–4 record and a sixth straight losing season.

In 2018 Karl Stollery became the first Merrimack player to represent his country in the Olympics. Stollery played for Team Canada.

=== Scott Borek era (2018-present) ===
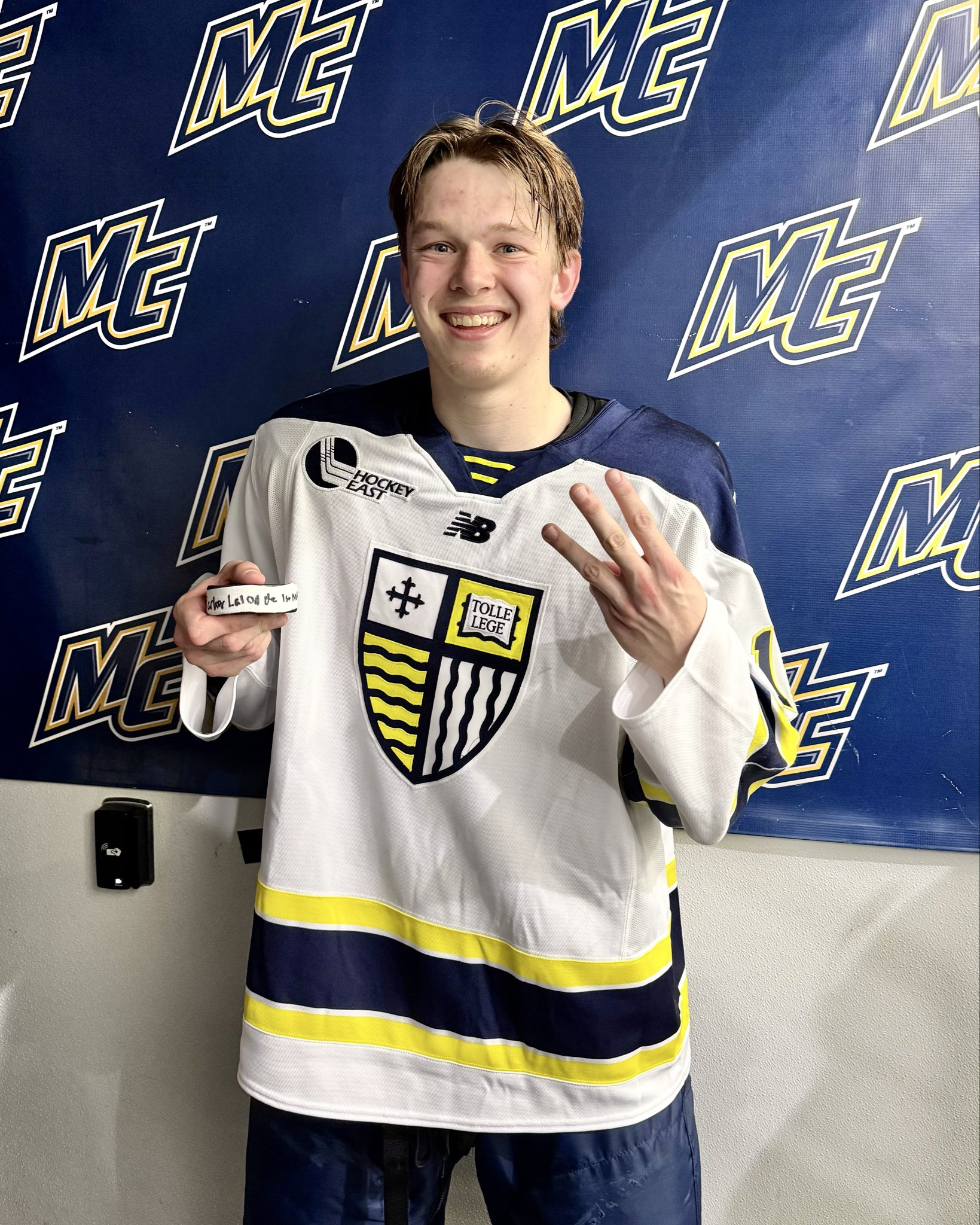
Merrimack player Parker Lalonde holding his first collegiate goal

Scott Borek was hired as the team's head coach on April 9, 2018. After a couple of unsuccessful seasons under Borek things started to change for him and the Warriors. During the 2021–22 season the Warriors had their first winning season in nearly 10 years going 19–15–1. They kept this momentum going during following year in the 2022–23 season. But just before the season would start tragedy struck the program as 6th year assist coach Josh Ciocco would die suddenly. The Warriors would wear a black patch on their jerseys this season with the initials JC honoring their former coach. Even with this adversity the Warriors would go on to have a great season. As Borek led the warriors to a 23-14-1 record. Being ranked in the top 20 for most of the season and finished 2nd in Hockey East. This gave them a first round bye in the 2023 Hockey East Tournament. They played Boston College in the quarterfinals and won 1–0 in double overtime advancing to the semifinals in the TD Garden for the first time since 2011. They would face Umass Lowell in the semifinals. The Warriors would once again win in double overtime 2–1 making it to the Hockey East championship game for the first time since 2011. They would go on to lose a heartbreaker to Boston University 3–2 in overtime. The Warriors season would not end here though as they would get an at large bid to the 2023 NCAA tournament as the No. 14 team in the country. This was the third time the Warriors had made the D1 tournament. They faced Quinnipiac in the first round and lost 5–0. During the 2023–24 season Merrimack captain Ben Brar broke the program record for most games played. He finished his tenure with 155 total games with the Warriors.

After two unsuccessful seasons Borek and the Warriors would turn things around after starting the 2025–26 season 5-10, they would finish out the regular season strong going on a 12-5-2 run and finished 10-12-2 in hockey east play. During the 2026 Hockey East men's tournament they knocked off UMass Lowell 5-3 in the opening round and then beat the #1 seed Providence College 3-2 in overtime to reach the semifinals at the TD Garden for just the fourth time. The Warriors then beat UMass 2-0 in the semifinals to make their third Hockey East championship game appearance. They would defeat UConn in the championship game 2-1, winning their first ever Hockey East tournament championship in program history along with becoming the first ever #8 seed to do so. They were defeated by North Dakota 3-0 in the NCAA Northeast Regional Semifinal.

== Season-by-season results ==
Source:

== Championships ==
=== National Championships ===
Year	Champion	Score	Runner-up	City
1978	Merrimack College	12-2	Lake Forest	Springfield Massachusetts

Runners-up in 1984.

=== Hockey East Tournament ===
Year	Champion	Score	Runner-up
2026	Merrimack College	2-1	UConn

Runners-up in 2011 and 2023

=== ECAC 2 Tournament championships ===
Year	Champion	Score	Runner-up
1967	Merrimack College	6-4	Colby
1968	Merrimack College	5-4	Hamilton
1977	Merrimack College	6-4	Union
1980	Merrimack College	4-0	UMass Lowell

Runners-up in 1966, 1976, 1978, 1981, 1982

(in 1978 the ECAC 2 split into east and a West conferences)

=== ECAC 2 regular-season championships ===
Year	Conference record	Overall record	Coach
1967-68	12-1	18-8	J Thom Lawler
1968-69	7-2	8-13	J Thom Lawler
1974-75	22-2-1	23-8-1	J Thom Lawler
1975-76	21-2	24-7	J Thom Lawler
1976-77	20-2-1	23-11-1	J Thom Lawler

=== ECAC East Tournament championships ===
Year	Champion	Score	Runner-up
1987	Merrimack College	3-0	Babson
1988	Merrimack College	4-1	Bowdion
1989	Merrimack College	9-4	Bowdion

=== ECAC East regular-season championships ===
Year	Conference record	Overall record	Coach
1986-87	22-2	29-7	Ron Anderson
1987-88	22-0	34-6	Ron Anderson
1988-89	14-2	27-7	Ron Anderson

==== In-season tournament and event championships ====
- Codfish Bowl (2): Seasons 1970-71 1975–76
- Merrimack Christmas Tournament (3): Seasons 1971-72, 1973-74, 1977-78
- Bishop's University Tournament (1): Seasons 1973–73
- Merrimack invitational (1): Seasons 1974–75
- Lowell Thanksgiving Tournament (2): Seasons 1974-75, 1975-76
- Skate 3 tournament (1): Seasons 1976–77
- Merrimack Thanksgiving Tournament (4): Seasons 1977-78, 1979-80, 1981-82, 1982-83
- Oswego Classic (1): Seasons 1979-80
- Blue Gold tournament (3): Seasons 1979-80, 1981-82, 1983-84
- National Capital Hockey Tournament (1): Seasons 1993–94
- Rensselaer Holiday Tournament (1): Seasons 2002–03
- Dunkin' Donuts Coffee Pot (1): Seasons 2004–05
- Turkey Leg Classic (1): Seasons 2023–24

== All-time coaching records ==
As of the completion of 2023–24 season

Tenure	Coach	Years	Record	Pct.
1956–1964	Jim Reynolds	8	46–45–3	.505
1964–1965	Ron Ryan	1	6–8–0	.429
1965–1978	J. Thom Lawler	13	218–138–10	.609
1978–1983	Bruce Parker	5	100–76–5	.566
1983–1998	Ron Anderson	15	254–253–24	.501
1998–2005	Chris Serino	7	78–149–27	.360
2005–2018	Mark Dennehy	13	168–243–60	.420
2018–Present	Scott Borek	7	89–124–12	.422
Totals	8 coaches	69 seasons	956–1040–141	.480

== Awards and honors ==
=== NCAA ===
==== Individual awards ====
Division II-III Hobey Baker award

- Jim Vesey, F: 1988

Tim Taylor Award

- Stéphane Da Costa, C: 2010

NCAA tournament Most Outstanding player

- Jim Toomey, F: 1978

==== All-American Teams ====
AHCA Second Team All-Americans

- 1998–99: Rejean Stringer, F
- 2010–11: Stéphane Da Costa, F
- 2011–12: Joe Cannata, G
- 2012–13: Mike Collins, F
- 2022–23: Alex Jefferies, F

AHCA D2 All Americans

- 1972-73: Mark Petit, D
- 1974-75: Billy Dunn, F
- 1975-76: Mike Reynolds, F
- 1976-77: Paul Dunn, F
- 1978-79: Bob Magnuson, D
- 1979-80: Dean Fraser, F
- 1979-80: Tom Lawler, F
- 1980-81: Tom Lawler, F
- 1985-86: Jim Vesey, F
- 1986-87: Bob Fowler, D
- 1986-87: Jim Hrivnak, G
- 1986-87: Mike Boyce, D
- 1986-87: Jim Vesey, F
- 1987-88: Jim Vesey, F
- 1987-88: Mike Boyce, D
- 1987-88 Jim Hrivnak, G

=== Hockey East ===
==== Individual awards ====
Rookie of the Year

- Stéphane Da Costa, C: 2010

Three-Stars Award

- Joe Exter, G: 2003

Goaltending Champion

- Collin Delia: 2017

Coach of the Year

- Mark Dennehy: 2010

Tournament MVP

- Max Lundgren: 2026

==== All-Conference teams ====
First Team

- 1994–95: Martin Legault, G
- 1996–97: Martin Legault, G
- 2011–12: Joe Cannata, G
- 2012–13: Mike Collins, F
- 2022–23: Alex Jefferies, F

Second Team

- 1998–99: Rejean Stringer, F
- 2000–01: Anthony Aquino, F
- 2002–03: Joe Exter, G
- 2004–05: Bryan Schmidt, D
- 2009–10: Stéphane Da Costa, D
- 2010–11: Stéphane Da Costa, D
- 2011–12: Karl Stollery, D
- 2012–13: Jordan Heywood, D
- 2021–22: Declan Carlile, D

Third Team

- 2016–17: Collin Delia, G
- 2017–18: Brett Seney, F
- 2022–23: Hugo Ollas, G

Rookie Team

- 1992–93: Mark Goble, F
- 1993–94: John Jakopin, F
- 1994–95: Casey Kesselring, F
- 1995–96: Darrel Scoville, D
- 1998–99: Greg Classen, F
- 1999–00: Anthony Aquino, F
- 2000–01: Joe Exter, G
- 2002–03: Bryan Schmidt, D
- 2003–04: Jim Healey, G
- 2005–06: Rob Ricci, F
- 2008–09: Karl Stollery, D
- 2009–10: Stéphane Da Costa, F
- 2010–11: Mike Collins, F
- 2018–19: Chase Gresock, F
- 2019–20: Declan Carlile, D
- 2020–21: Alex Jefferies, F

=== ECAC East ===
ECAC east league MVP

- Jim Hrivnak, G (1987)

Rookie of the year

- Jim Hrivnak, G (1986)

ECAC east first team All-Star

- Jim Vesey ( 1985-86, 1986-87, 1987-88)

ECAC East finals MVP

- Jim Hrivnak, G 2x (1987, 1988)

=== Other awards ===
Clark Hodder coach of the year

- Ron Anderson (1997)
- Mark Dennehy 2x (2010, 2011)

Terry Flanagan Award

- Stu Irving (2003)

== Statistical leaders ==
=== Career points leaders ===
Player	Years	GP	G	A	Pts	PIM
Jim Vesey	1984–1988	140	110	134	244	
Richard Pion	1985–1989	124	103	128	231	
Mike Reynolds	1972–1976	124	113	111	224	
Tom Lawler	1977–1981	138	102	119	221	
Jim Toomey	1976–1980	140	99	121	220	
Mickey Rego	1977–1981	136	94	108	202	
Mark Ziliotto	1985–1989	136	84	100	184	
Bob Magnuson	1976–1980	132	90	91	181	
Billy Dunn	1972–1975	102	81	96	177	
Andy Heinze	1986–1990	144	77	89	166	

=== Career goaltending leaders ===
GP = Games played; Min = Minutes played; W = Wins; L = Losses; T = Ties; GA = Goals against; SO = Shutouts; SV% = Save percentage; GAA = Goals against average

minimum 30 games played

Player	Years	GP	Min	W	L	T	GA	SO	SV%	GAA
Joe Exter	2000-2003	88	7000	31	47	8	271	1	.912	2.32
Jim Hrivnak	1985-1989	113	6594	88	23	2	291	11	.921	2.38
Sam Marotta	2010–2014	47	2360	14	19	4	94	3	.917	2.39
Rasmus Tirronen	2011–2015	68	3893	22	34	8	159	3	.918	2.45
Joe Cannata	2008–2012	122	7145	59	46	16	294	7	.915	2.47
Hugo Ollas	2021–2024	62	3319	27	27	0	82	6	.914	2.48
Collin Delia	2014–2017	56	3240	21	24	10	134	4	.911	2.48

Statistics current through the end of the 2023–24 season.

== Merrimack athletic hall of fame ==
The following is a list of people associated with the Merrimack men's ice hockey program who were elected into the Merrimack college Athletic Hall of Fame (induction date in parentheses)

- Dave Pollard (1984)
- J. Thom Lawler (1984)
- Paul Thabault (1984)
- Mike Reynolds (1984)
- Peter Melchiono (1985)
- Jim Reynolds (1985)
- Mark Petit (1985)
- Paul Dunn (1986)
- Bill Dunn (1986)
- John Twomey (1989)
- Thomas Keeling (1991)
- Gilles Moffet (1991)
- James Toomey (1993)
- Robert C. Magnuson Jr. (1993)
- Jim Vesey (2003)
- Michael Boyce (2004)
- Jim Hrivnak (2018)
- Richard Pion (2023)
- Ron Anderson (2023)

== Lawler Arena ==
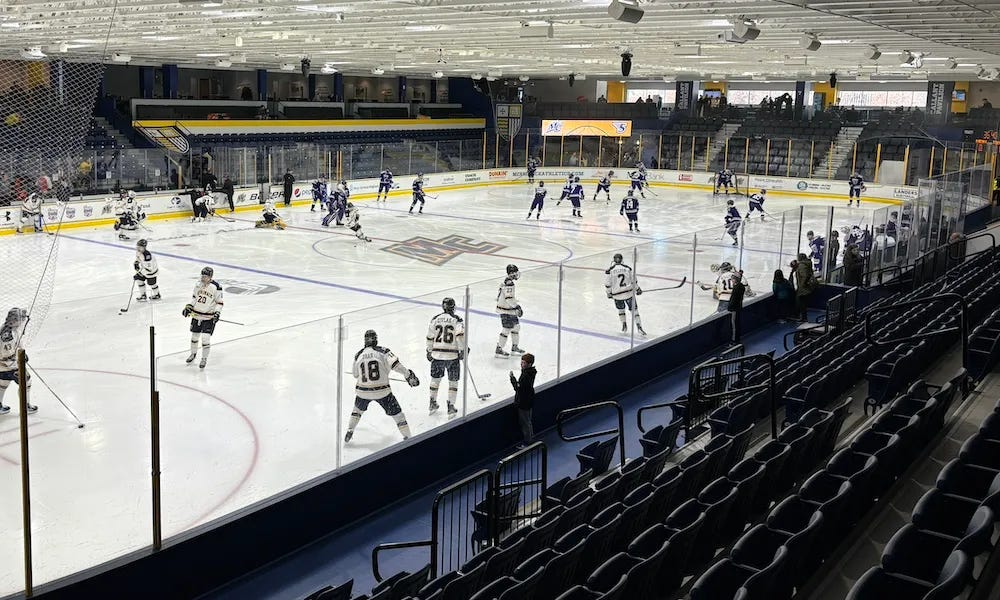
Lawler arena post renovations in 2024

Merrimack plays its home games at Lawler Arena which is located in the Merrimack athletic complex in North Andover, Massachusetts. The rink is named after former Warriors coach J. Thom Lawler who led the Warriors to a Division II national championship in 1978. It has a capacity of 2,549 making it the smallest arena in Hockey East. In 2023 the arena saw new renovations adding a new video board and the all new Gallant Pavilion.

== Current roster ==
As of September 13, 2025.

No.	Nat.	Player	Class	Pos	Height	Weight	DoB	Hometown	Previous team	NHL rights
2	(Canada)	Nathan King	Sophomore	D	6' 2" (1.88 m)	192 lb (87 kg)	2004-06-11	Victoria, British Columbia	Victoria Grizzlies (BCHL)	—
3	(Sweden)	Filip Nordberg	Freshman	D	6' 5" (1.96 m)	212 lb (96 kg)	2004-03-05	Stockholm, Sweden	Sioux Falls Stampede (USHL)	OTT, 64th overall 2022
4	(United States)	Seamus Powell	Junior	D	6' 0" (1.83 m)	176 lb (80 kg)	2004-04-26	Marcellus, New York	Dubuque Fighting Saints (USHL)	—
6	(United States)	Daniel Astapovich	Freshman	D	6' 3" (1.91 m)	198 lb (90 kg)	2005-03-13	Birmingham, Michigan	Cedar Rapids RoughRiders (USHL)	—
7	(United States)	Ethan Beyer	Freshman	D	5' 11" (1.8 m)	183 lb (83 kg)	2004-03-18	Philadelphia, Pennsylvania	Brooks Bandits (BCHL)	—
8	(Canada)	Hunter Mayo	Freshman	D	6' 1" (1.85 m)	196 lb (89 kg)	2004-05-07	Martensville, Saskatchewan	Swift Current Broncos (WHL)	—
9	(Canada)	Jack Richard	Sophomore (RS)	F	6' 4" (1.93 m)	180 lb (82 kg)	2002-12-13	Stoney Creek, Ontario	Niagara (AHA)	—
10	(Canada)	Trevor Hoskin	Sophomore	F	6' 1" (1.85 m)	174 lb (79 kg)	2004-05-18	Belleville, Ontario	Niagara (AHA)	CGY, 106th overall 2024
11	(United States)	Nick Pierre	Sophomore	F	5' 9" (1.75 m)	165 lb (75 kg)	2004-04-09	Cottage Grove, Minnesota	Omaha Lancers (USHL)	—
12	(Canada)	Parker Lalonde	Freshman	F	6' 1" (1.85 m)	176 lb (80 kg)	2004-01-22	Aberdeen, Saskatchewan	Brooks Bandits (BCHL)	—
13	(Canada)	Joey Henneberry	Freshman	F	6' 2" (1.88 m)	192 lb (87 kg)	2004-12-20	Halifax, Nova Scotia	Cape Breton Eagles (QMJHL)	—
14	(United States)	Riley Bassen	Freshman	F	5' 11" (1.8 m)	172 lb (78 kg)	2005-04-26	Frisco, Texas	Fargo Force (USHL)	—
15	(Canada)	Vann Yuhas	Freshman	F	6' 0" (1.83 m)	174 lb (79 kg)	2004-02-20	Medicine Hat, Alberta	Drumheller Dragons (AJHL)	—
16	(Canada)	Ty Daneault	Junior	F	5' 11" (1.8 m)	192 lb (87 kg)	2004-12-20	Red Deer, Alberta	Drumheller Dragons (AJHL)	—
17	(Canada)	Cam Kungle	Junior	D	6' 3" (1.91 m)	202 lb (92 kg)	2002-03-28	Red Deer, Alberta	Lake Superior State (CCHA)	—
19	(Canada)	Mark Hillier	Graduate	F	6' 1" (1.85 m)	180 lb (82 kg)	2002-03-18	Labrador City, Newfoundland and Labrador	Summerside Western Capitals (MHL)	—
20	(Canada)	Nolan Flamand	Freshman	F	5' 9" (1.75 m)	181 lb (82 kg)	2004-01-12	Saskatoon, Saskatchewan	Brandon Wheat Kings (WHL)	—
21	(United States)	Caden Cranston	Sophomore	F	5' 10" (1.78 m)	174 lb (79 kg)	2004-03-23	Rochester, New York	Surrey Eagles (BCHL)	—
22	(Canada)	Trent Ballantyne	Freshman	D	6' 3" (1.91 m)	183 lb (83 kg)	2004-02-29	London, Ontario	Prince George Spruce Kings (BCHL)	—
24	(United States)	Austin Oravetz	Junior	D	5' 9" (1.75 m)	192 lb (87 kg)	2003-09-26	Canonsburg, Pennsylvania	Michigan State (Big Ten)	—
25	(United States)	Luke Weilandt	Junior	F	5' 10" (1.78 m)	181 lb (82 kg)	2002-04-04	Northbrook, Illinois	Wenatchee Wild (BCHL)	—
26	(United States)	Michael Emerson	Junior	F	6' 1" (1.85 m)	190 lb (86 kg)	2003-11-26	Yorktown Heights, New York	Chicago Steel (USHL)	CAR, 190th overall 2023
27	(Canada)	Ben Yurchuk	Freshman	F	5' 8" (1.73 m)	170 lb (77 kg)	2005-02-19	Montréal, Quebec	Chicago Steel (USHL)	—
28	(United States)	Ryan O'Connell	Sophomore	F	5' 10" (1.78 m)	187 lb (85 kg)	2003-10-23	Moorestown, New Jersey	Cedar Rapids RoughRiders (USHL)	—
29	(Canada)	Caelan Fitzpatrick	Sophomore	F	5' 11" (1.8 m)	185 lb (84 kg)	2003-06-17	Moose Jaw, Saskatchewan	Brooks Bandits (BCHL)	—
30	(Sweden)	Nils Wallström	Junior	G	6' 3" (1.91 m)	185 lb (84 kg)	2003-10-15	Skellefteå, Sweden	American International (AHA)	—
31	(United States)	Ryan Keyes	Sophomore	G	6' 2" (1.88 m)	172 lb (78 kg)	2003-04-25	Fairbanks, Alaska	South Shore Kings (NCDC)	—
47	(Sweden)	Max Lundgren	Sophomore	G	6' 5" (1.96 m)	229 lb (104 kg)	2002-04-03	Ängelholm, Sweden	Des Moines Buccaneers (USHL)	—

== Olympians ==
This is a list of Merrimack alumni were a part of an Olympic team.

Name	Position	Merrimack Tenure	Team	Year	Finish
Karl Stollery	Defenseman	2008–2012	(Canada) CAN	2018	Bronze
Stéphane Da Costa	Centre	2009–2011	(France) FRA	2026	11th

== Warriors in the NHL ==
As of September 1, 2026.

Player	Position	Team(s)	Years	Games	Stanley Cups
Declan Carlile	Defenseman	TBL, PIT	2023–Present	46	0
Greg Classen	Center	NSH	2000–2003	90	0
Mark Cornforth	Defenseman	BOS	1995–1996	6	0
Stéphane Da Costa	Center	OTT	2010–2014	47	0
Collin Delia	Goaltender	CHI, VAN	2017–2023	52	0
Matt Foy	Right Wing	MIN	2005–2008	56	0
Jim Hrivnak	Goaltender	WSH, WIN, STL	1989–1994	85	0
John Jakopin	Defenseman	FLA, PIT, SJS	1997–2003	113	0
Bob Jay	Defenseman	LAK	1993–1994	3	0
Johnathan Kovacevic	Defenseman	WPG, MTL, NJD	2021–Present	258	0
Steve McKenna	Defenseman	LAK, MIN, PIT, NYR	1996–2004	373	0
Darrel Scoville	Defenseman	CGY, CBJ	1999–2004	16	0
Brett Seney	Left Wing	NJD, TOR, CHI	2018–2024	66	0
Karl Stollery	Defenseman	COL, SJS, NJD	2013–2017	23	0
Jim Vesey	Center	STL, BOS	1988–1992	15	0

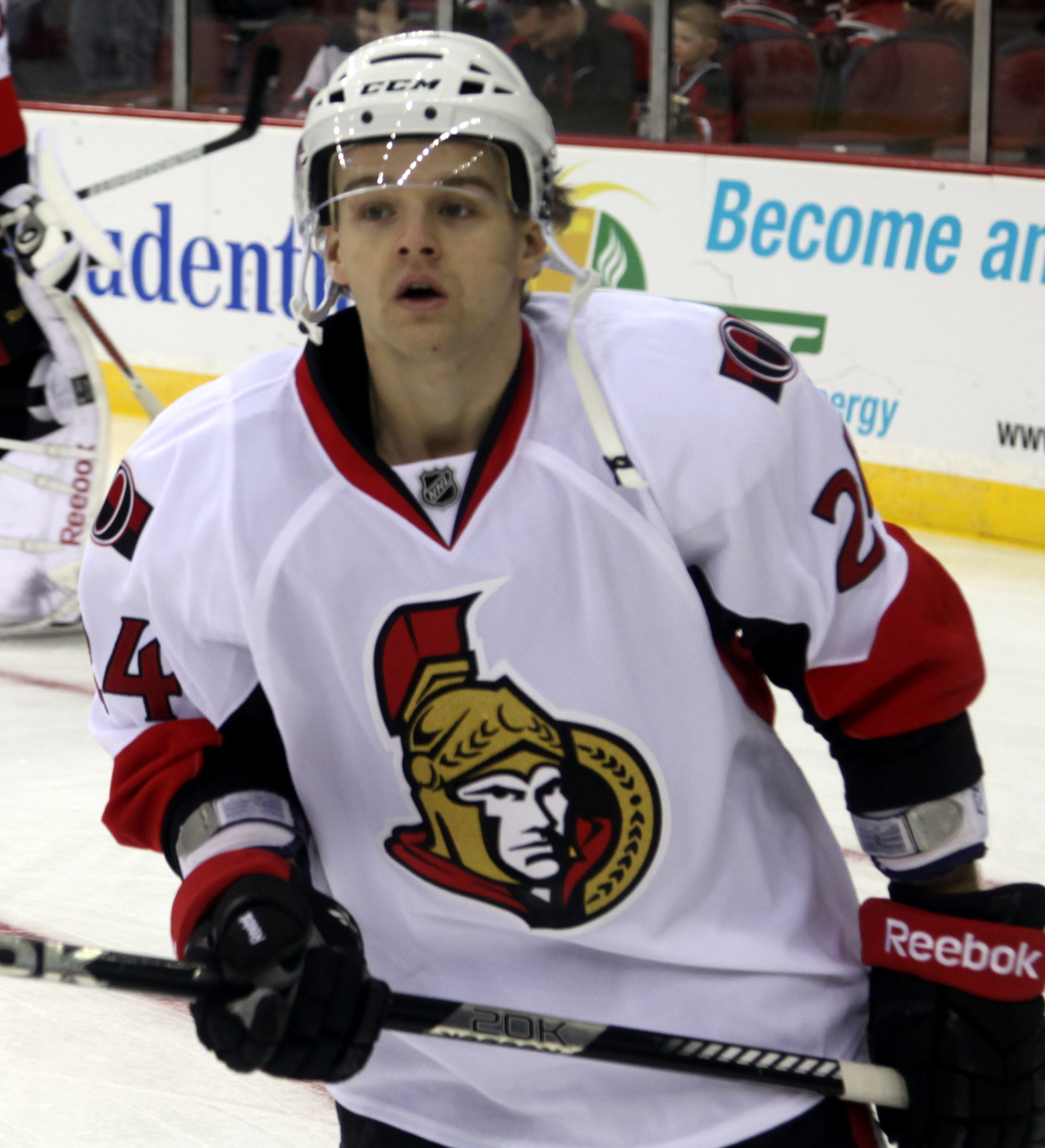
Stéphane Da Costa

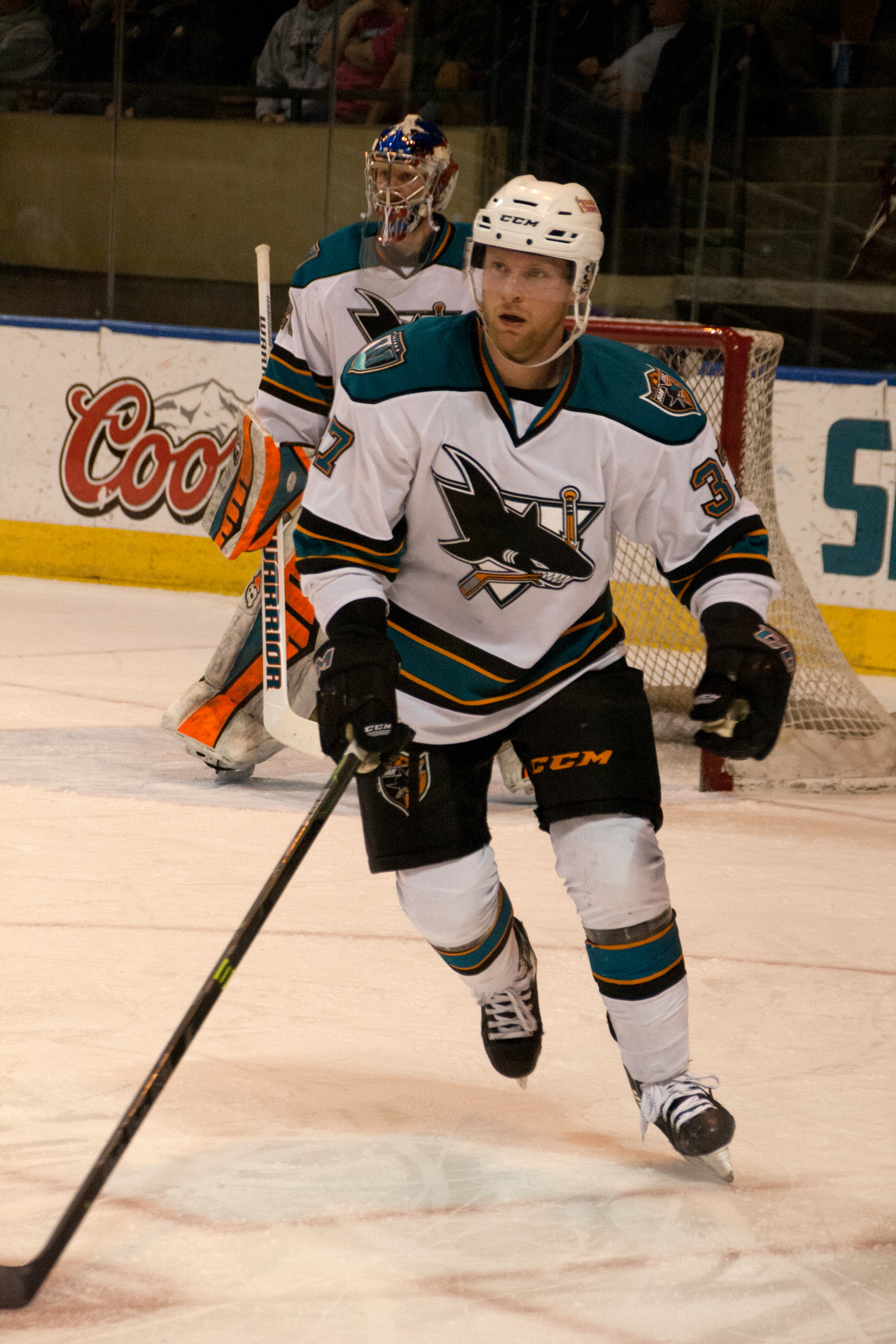
Karl Stollery

== NHL Entry Draft Selections ==
As of May 17, 2024.

Player	Position	Draft Year	Selection	Team
Bob Magnuson	Forward	1978	Round 14 Pick 230	Montreal Canadiens
Jim Vesey	Center	1984	Round 8 Pick 155	St Louis Blues
Mark Ziliotto	Forward	1984	Round 12 Pick 230	Pittsburgh Penguins
Chris Kiene	Defenceman	1984	Round 12 Pick 231	New Jersey Devils
Doug Greschuk	Defenceman	1985	Round 11 Pick 212	Pittsburgh Penguins
Jim Hrivnak	Goalie	1986	Round 3 Pick 61	Washington Capitals
Robert Kelley	Left Wing	1987	Round 7 Pick 143	Montreal Canadiens
Sean Dooley	Defenceman	1987	Round 8 Pick 148	Buffalo Sabers
Alex Weinrich	Defenceman	1987	Round 12 Pick 238	Toronto Maple Leafs
Ben Lebeau	Forward	1988	Round 5 Pick 101	Winnipeg Jets
Matt Hentges	Defenceman	1988	Round 9 Pick 194	Chicago Blackhawks
Mike Doneghey	Defenceman	1989	Round 12 Pick 237	Chicago Blackhawks
Dan Hodge	Defencemen	1991	Round 9 Pick 194	Boston Bruins
John Jakopin	Defenceman	1993	Round 4 Pick 97	Detroit Red Wings
Gaetan Poirier	Left Wing	1996	Round 6 Pick 156	Florida Panthers
Marco Rosa	Center	2001	Round 8 Pick 255	Dallas Stars
Anthony Aquino	Forward	2001	Round 3 Pick 92	Dallas Stars
Matt Foy	Forward	2002	Round 6 Pick 175	Minnesota Wild
Kyle Bigos	Defenceman	2009	Round 4 Pick 99	Edmonton Oilers
Joe Cannata	Goalie	2009	Round 6 Pick 173	Vancouver Canucks
Chris LeBlanc	Forward	2013	Round 6 Pick 161	Ottawa Senators
Brent Seney	Left Wing	2015	Round 6 Pick 157	New Jersey Devils
Patrick Holway	Defenceman	2015	Round 6 Pick 170	Detroit Red Wings
Johnathan Kovacevic	Defencemen	2017	Round 3 Pick 74	Winnipeg Jets
Zachary Uens	Defencemen	2020	Round 4 Pick 105	Florida Panthers
Alex Jefferies	Left Wing	2020	Round 4 Pick 121	New York Islanders
Hugo Ollas	Goalie	2020	Round 7 Pick 197	New York Rangers
Matt Copponi	Center	2023	Round 7 Pick 216	Edmonton Oilers
