= Darrel Scoville =

Canadian ice hockey player

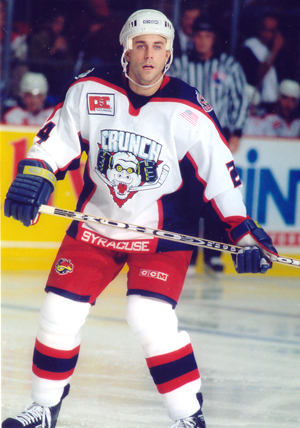
- Scoville with the Syracuse Crunch during the 2001–02 season
- Born: October 13, 1975 (age 50) Swift Current, Saskatchewan, Canada
- Height: 6 ft 3 in (191 cm)
- Weight: 208 lb (94 kg; 14 st 12 lb)
- Position: Defence
- Shot: Left
- Played for: Calgary Flames; Columbus Blue Jackets
- NHL draft: Undrafted
- Playing career: 1998–2011

Darrel Scoville (born October 13, 1975) is a Canadian former professional ice hockey defenceman. He played in the National Hockey League for the Calgary Flames and the Columbus Blue Jackets between 1999 and 2004, playing 16 regular season games, scoring one assist and collecting 12 penalty minutes. He also played in the American Hockey League for the Saint John Flames (scoring the Calder Cup championship-clinching goal in the 2001 AHL Calder Cup Finals), Syracuse Crunch, Hershey Bears and the Providence Bruins. He signed to Black Wings in 2009.

== Career statistics ==
=== Regular season and playoffs ===
			Regular season					Playoffs
Season	Team	League	GP	G	A	Pts	PIM	GP	G	A	Pts	PIM
1993–94	Lebret Eagles	SJHL	64	10	15	25	53	—	—	—	—	—
1994–95	Lebret Eagles	SJHL	61	15	50	65	108	—	—	—	—	—
1995–96	Merrimack College	NCAA	34	6	19	25	54	—	—	—	—	—
1996–97	Merrimack College	NCAA	35	7	16	23	71	—	—	—	—	—
1997–98	Merrimack College	NCAA	38	4	26	30	84	—	—	—	—	—
1998–99	Saint John Flames	AHL	61	1	7	8	66	7	1	2	3	13
1999–00	Calgary Flames	NHL	6	0	0	0	2	—	—	—	—	—
1999–00	Saint John Flames	AHL	64	11	25	36	99	3	1	2	3	0
2000–01	Saint John Flames	AHL	76	15	32	47	125	11	2	6	8	8
2001–02	Syracuse Crunch	AHL	51	5	16	21	60	10	0	0	0	6
2002–03	Columbus Blue Jackets	NHL	2	0	0	0	4	—	—	—	—	—
2002–03	Syracuse Crunch	AHL	24	4	9	13	26	—	—	—	—	—
2003–04	Columbus Blue Jackets	NHL	8	0	1	1	6	—	—	—	—	—
2003–04	Syracuse Crunch	AHL	70	10	32	42	73	6	0	2	2	4
2004–05	Hershey Bears	AHL	7	0	0	0	11	—	—	—	—	—
2004–05	Providence Bruins	AHL	43	1	6	7	26	—	—	—	—	—
2005–06	Villacher SV	EBEL	47	4	19	23	82	13	1	3	4	28
2006–07	Villacher SV	EBEL	55	17	21	38	137	8	1	4	5	16
2007–08	Villacher SV	EBEL	42	5	12	17	48	5	1	2	3	6
2008–09	Villacher SV	EBEL	52	11	24	35	60	5	0	2	2	31
2009–10	Black Wings Linz	EBEL	7	0	4	4	18	—	—	—	—	—
2010–11	HC Alleghe	ITA	30	5	11	16	52	5	2	3	5	4
AHL totals			396	47	127	174	486	37	4	12	16	31
EBEL totals			203	37	80	117	345	31	3	11	14	81
NHL totals			16	0	1	1	12	—	—	—	—	—

== Awards and honors ==
Award	Year
All-Hockey East Rookie Team	1995–96
Hockey East All-Tournament Team	1998
