= Joe Exter =

American ice hockey player (born 1978)

- Born: December 19, 1978 (age 47) Cranston, Rhode Island, US
- Height: 5 ft 11 in (180 cm)
- Weight: 183 lb (83 kg; 13 st 1 lb)
- Position: Goaltender
- Caught: Left
- Played for: Wheeling Nailers
- NHL draft: undrafted
- Playing career: 2003–2005
- Coaching career

Biographical details
- Education: Merrimack College

Coaching career (HC unless noted)
- 2005–2006: American International (assistant)
- 2006–2007: Cedar Rapids Roughriders (assistant)
- 2007–2011: USNTDP (goaltending)
- 2009–2012: US National Junior Team (assistant)
- 2012–2017: Ohio State (assistant)
- 2017–2022: Michigan State (assistant)
- 2022-2024: Iowa Heartlanders (assistant)
- 2024-present: St. Cloud Norsemen

Head coaching record
- Overall: 30-22-7

Joe Exter (born December 19, 1978) is a retired American ice hockey goaltender. He is famous for playing two seasons with the ECHL's Wheeling Nailers several months after being in a coma due to an on-ice collision.

== Career ==
Exter started his career with the Erie Otters, where he split time with former Edmonton Oilers draft pick Patrick Dovigi and former Los Angeles Kings draft pick Steve Valiquette. He played eleven games, going 0-4-0 with a 4.13 GAA. After a year with the Waterloo Black Hawks of the USHL where he shared duties with two other goalies, Exter moved on to Merrimack College of Hockey East. Exter started more than twenty-five games in each of his three seasons with Merrimack College, compiling a 31-47-8 record. In his freshman year he would be selected to the hockey east all rookie team. During his sophomore year he would serve as one of the team’s assistant captains. During his 3rd and final year in the 2002-03 season he would be named team captain. Exter led Merrimack to a surprising race for home ice throughout much of the season, including the team's first-ever regular season Division I tournament title with wins over host Rensselaer and Wayne State at the 52nd Annual Rensselaer/HSBC Holiday Hockey Tournament. In late December Exter was selected to the All-Hockey East Team by league coaches. As well as honored when he was given the hockey east 3 stars award.

== Coma ==
On March 8, 2003, Exter and Boston College forward Patrick Eaves were racing for an open puck with about six minutes left in the game. Exter and Eaves collided, with Eaves' left hip striking Exter in the head. The resulting hit knocked Exter's helmet from his head. As Exter's head hit the ice, he was knocked unconscious and blood began to pour from both of his ears. Paramedics on standby for the game and trainers from both Merrimack and Boston college treated Exter and immobilized him before removing him from the ice and transporting him to Beth Israel Deaconess Medical Center. Upon admission, Exter was in a critical condition and was put in a medically induced coma for ten days, and doctors suggested that he retire from hockey. After ten days, Exter was taken off sedatives and started to acknowledge questions by a series of blinks. In less than three weeks, Exter was moved to Spaulding Rehabilitation Center, where he re-learned to speak and to swallow. A week later, Exter was released to his Cranston home. Exter would later say that he did not blame Eaves for the hit, and that the incident was "a hockey play."

Exter completed a series of rehabilitation tests within a week of therapy and decided that he was still could play hockey. By August, he was training on Merrimack's ice. Despite the numerous weeks of training and therapy, Exter received minimal interest from scouts. He would receive an offer from Pittsburgh Penguins scout Greg Malone, who had been scouting Exter prior to his accident. Exter eventually signed with the Wilkes-Barre/Scranton Penguins, the Penguins' AHL affiliate, on December 24, 2003, and was immediately assigned to the Penguins' ECHL affiliate in Wheeling.

== Professional ==
In his rookie season, Exter went 8-2-0 in 15 games and led the team with a .924 save percentage. Since Exter played more than ten games in his rookie season, this activated a clause in his contract that required the Wilkes-Barre/Scranton Penguins to re-sign Exter for the following season.

During the 2004-05 season (which coincided with the NHL lockout), Exter shared goaltending duties with Pittsburgh Penguins draft picks Dany Sabourin and Andy Chiodo. Coincidentally, Ben Eaves, brother of Patrick Eaves and also a Penguins draft pick, was also a member of the 2004-05 Nailers. Exter finished the season 10-13-2 with a career-high four shutouts.

== Coaching career ==
Upon his retirement, Exter became involved in coaching. He started as an assistant coach with American International College during the 2005-06 season. From 2008 to 2012, Exter was involved with both the US U18 and U20 programs, being named the first full-time goaltender coach in program history. During his tenure the teams brought home 3 gold medals.

In addition to working with the USA Hockey's National Team Development Program, Exter is also an assistant coach with the Ohio State University ice hockey team, being named to the coaching staff on July 11,

In 2017 he was hired as an assistant for Michigan state. He would stay with the program till 2022.

In 2022 he would leave Michigan state and was then named the associate coach and assistant GM of the Iowa Heartlanders in the ECHL.

In 2024 Exter would be given his first head coaching gig when he became general manager and head coach of the St. Cloud Norsemen. During his first season he would go 30-22-7 missing the playoffs.

== Awards and honors ==
Award	Year
All-Hockey East Rookie Team	2000–01
Merrimack Rookie of the year	2000-01
All-Hockey East Second Team	2002–03
Hockey East Three-Stars Award	2002-03
Merrimack team MVP	2002-03

== Personal life ==
Exter is married to his wife Erin they have a son together.

Awards and achievements
Preceded by Colin Hemingway	Hockey East Three-Stars Award (Shared With Ben Eaves); 2002–03	Succeeded by Keni Gibson
