= 1978 NCAA Division II men's ice hockey tournament =

- Teams: 4
- Finals site: American International College, Springfield, Massachusetts
- Champions: Merrimack Warriors (1st title)
- Runner-up: Lake Forest Foresters (1st title game)
- Semifinalists: Mankato State Mavericks (1st Frozen Four); Elmira Soaring Eagles (1st Frozen Four)
- Winning coach: J. Thom Lawler (1st title)
- MOP: Jim Toomey (Merrimack)
- Attendance: 2,409

The 1978 NCAA Men's Division II Ice Hockey Tournament involved 4 schools playing in single-elimination play to determine the national champion of men's NCAA Division II college ice hockey. A total of 4 games were played, hosted by American International College.

Merrimack, coached by Thom Lawler, won the national title with a 12–2 victory in the final game over Lake Forest.

Jim Toomey, of Merrimack, was named the Most Outstanding Player and was the high scorer of the tournament with seven points (1 goal, 6 assists).

== Qualifying teams ==
Due to the lack of conferences and tournaments for western schools the NCAA held a Western regional tournament to help select teams for the national tournament. The Western regional tournament is not considered as part of the NCAA championship but is included here for reference. No automatic bids were offered.

=== Western Championship Tournament ===
Regional semifinals
Mankato State	7
Illinois–Chicago	3
Lake Forest	5
St. Cloud State	1

Regional final
Mankato State	2
Lake Forest	5

=== National Tournament Teams ===
Team	Record
Elmira	26–4–0
Lake Forest	22–4–0
Merrimack	19–9–2
Mankato State	16–15–1

== Bracket ==
National semifinals March 16–17
Merrimack	6
Mankato State	1
Lake Forest	4
Elmira	1

National championship March 18
Merrimack	12
Lake Forest	2
Third place
Mankato State	5
Elmira	3

Note: * denotes overtime period(s)

== All-Tournament team ==
- G: Gilles Moffet (Merrimack)
- D: Dean Fraser (Merrimack)
- D: Ron Bisplinghoff (Elmira)
- F: Jim Toomey* (Merrimack)
- F: John Kenney (Elmira)
- F: John Pratt (Lake Forest)
