= Mike Collins (ice hockey) =

American ice hockey player (born 1990)

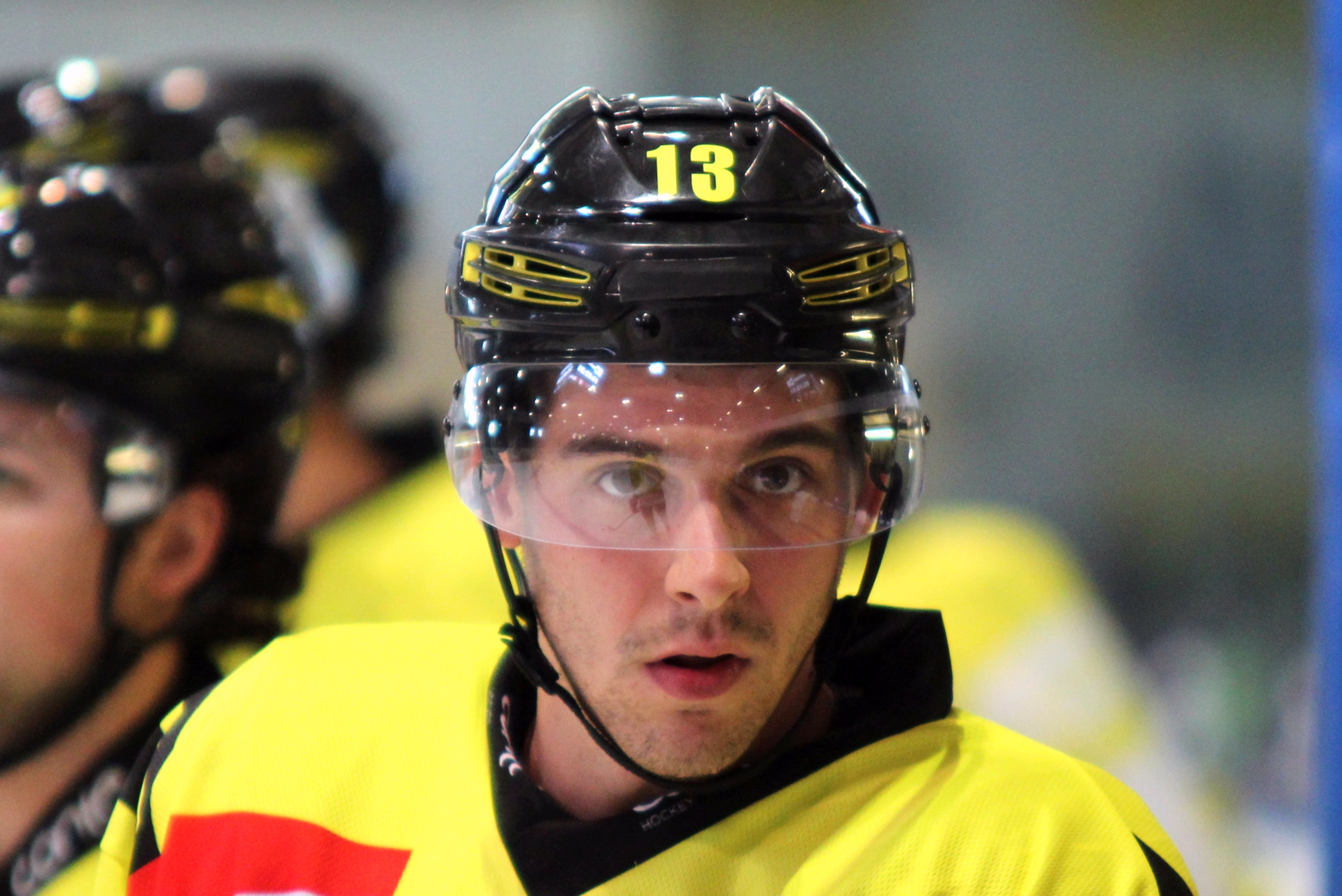
- Born: May 25, 1990 (age 36) Boston, Massachusetts, U.S.
- Height: 6 ft 1 in (185 cm)
- Weight: 185 lb (84 kg; 13 st 3 lb)
- Position: Forward
- Shoots: Left
- team Former teams: Free Agent; Providence Bruins; Iowa Wild; Krefeld Pinguine; ERC Ingolstadt
- NHL draft: Undrafted
- Playing career: 2014–present

Mike Collins (born May 25, 1990) is an American professional ice hockey player who is currently an unrestricted free agent. He most recently played for ERC Ingolstadt in the Deutsche Eishockey Liga (DEL).

== Playing career ==
Collins played collegiate hockey with the Merrimack Warriors in the NCAA Men's Division I Hockey East conference. In his junior year, Collins' outstanding play was rewarded with a selection to the 2012-13 All-Hockey East First Team.

After making his professional debut in the American Hockey League with the Providence Bruins and the Iowa Wild, Collins signed abroad in Germany with DEL2 club, EC Kassel Huskies on July 31, 2014. In the 2014–15 season, Collins impressed with the Huskies, scoring at a dominant level with 81 points in just 51 games to lead the club to a third-place finish in the regular season.

On June 1, 2015, Collins attracted the interest of the DEL, the German top flight, signing a one-year contract with the Krefeld Pinguine. He then had his contract renewed for the 2016-17 campaign. Collins left Krefeld at the conclusion of his two-year stint and was signed by fellow DEL outfit ERC Ingolstadt in June 2017.

== Awards and honors ==
Award	Year
College
All-Hockey East Rookie Team	2010–11
All-Hockey East First Team	2012–13
AHCA East Second-Team All-American	2012–13
Merrimack team MVP	2012-13 2013-14
