= J. Thom Lawler =

American ice hockey player and coach

Biographical details
- Born: January 3, 1934; Rome, New York, U.S.
- Died: June 11, 1978 (aged 44); Hampton Beach, New Hampshire, U.S.
- Education: St. Lawrence University

Playing career
- 1957–1960: St. Lawrence
- Position: Left Wing

Coaching career (HC unless noted)
- 1960–1961: Madrid–Waddington CS
- 1961–1965: Canton Central HS
- 1965–1978: Merrimack

Head coaching record
- Overall: 218-138-10 (.609)
- Tournaments: 2–0

Accomplishments and honors

Championships
- 1967 ECAC 2 Tournament Champion; 1968 ECAC 2 Regular Season Champion; 1968 ECAC 2 Tournament Champion; 1969 ECAC 2 Regular Season Champion; 1975 ECAC 2 Regular Season Champion; 1976 ECAC 2 Regular Season Champion; 1977 ECAC 2 Regular Season Champion; 1977 ECAC 2 Tournament Champion; 1978 NCAA National Championship

Awards
- Merrimack Athletics hall of fame (1984); Rome Sports hall of fame (1995)

John Thomas Lawler (January 3, 1934 – June 11, 1978) was an American ice hockey player and coach who won the inaugural NCAA Division II national championship in 1978 with Merrimack.

Lawler a graduate of St Lawrence University, where he played hockey and baseball. He later got involved in coaching following his graduation eventually ending up at Merrimack College in 1965, during his 13 year tenure at the Merrimack he would work his way up from and assistant athletic director to the head director and served as the hockey program’s head coach. Additionally he was the inaugural men’s soccer and golf coach.

Lawler died of a heart attack in 1978 just months after the Warriors won the national championship. In 2003 Merrimack re named their hockey rink in Lawler’s honor.

== Career ==
Lawler was born in Rome, New York and graduated from Rome Free Academy, where he played varsity football, hockey, and baseball. He served in the United States Army during the Korean War (February 4, 1953 to January 25, 1956). Lawler played hockey in Japan during his service. When returning from deployment went on to Lawler play three seasons at St. Lawrence during their heyday under George Menard. Lawler helped the Saints to back-to-back Tri-State League championships in 1959 and 1960 receiving the top eastern seed both years. While Lawler's team fell just short in his junior season with two overtime losses in the 1959 NCAA Tournament they fell flat in their return the following year, losing in the semifinal to Michigan Tech 3–13. Lawler was also a member of the schools baseball team as well. In 1958 he led the team in runs helping lead them to their first NCAA tournament appearance as well as being named team MVP. He would later captain the team his senior year.

After graduating Lawler would spend a year at Madrid Waddington CS coaching the schools baseball, football and basketball teams. He would then move to Canton Central HS coaching their hockey team for 4 seasons winning the Northern League title three times. before ultimately leaving after the 1965 season.

Lawler would then become an assistant athletic director at Merrimack in 1965. He was then given an opportunity to coach the hockey team when former head coach Ron Ryan left after one season behind the bench. Lawler's first season ended with a 8–10–1 record. Which would be good enough to help the warriors qualify for the first conference tournament in program history. They would even upset the 1 seed AIC 4-1 in the first round but would ultimately lose in the championship game. The following season saw the Warriors finish 4th in the ECAC 2 and qualify for tournament for the second year in a row. After dropping league champion Norwich 12–3 in the semifinal the Warriors defeated Colby 6–4 to capture their first conference championship. Lawler's team repeated as tournament champions the following year beating Hamilton 5-4. While also claiming their first regular season title, going 12–1 in conference play. They would win a second league title the following year in 1969. Later that same year Lawler would be promoted to head athletic director of Merrimack. In 1970 Lawler would lead the warriors to their first in season tournament championship. When they would beat Boston state 6-5 to win the Codfish bowl. Merrimack would then decline for a couple years before building back up into a conference powerhouse. He would lead the warriors to 5 straight seasons of 20 or mores wins from 1973-1978 going 112-48-6 overall and 78-14-4 in conference during this stretch. Then for three consecutive years from 1975 through 1977 Merrimack won the ECAC 2 regular season title, going 63–8–2 in conference over those three seasons. Specifically During the 1976-77 they would go 23-11-1 and 20-2-1 and would finally win their 3rd tournament title beating Union 6-4. The following year the NCAA would institute a Division II national championship for the 1977–78 season and Merrimack responded by finishing second in the conference. The Warriors fell in the ECAC 2 title game to Bowdoin, however, because university policy prohibited Bowdoin from participating in national tournaments Merrimack was invited to take place in the tournament as the ECAC East representative.

Lawler's team opened against Mankato State and won the game fairly easily (6–1). In the championship game they faced off against Lake Forest and completely took over the game, eventually winning by a score of 12–2. Winning the first national championship in the history of the school.

During his tenure Lawler would be the first coach in program history to hit the 100 and 200 win mark.

Two months after the tournament, Lawler suffered a heart attack at his summer residence in Hampton Beach, New Hampshire and died at the age of 44.

After his untimely death Lawler was honored for his accomplishments. Merrimack renamed their home rink in his honor and began awarding alumni the J. Thom Lawler Award for their contributions to the ice hockey program. On top of this the ECAC 2 renamed their player of the year award after Lawler. After the ECAC 2 folded The NCAA would later confer an annual J. Thom Lawler award to the Division II or III player from New England for their commitment to their program, university and community. Then vice-president of development at Merrimack Bob Hatem had this to say about Coach Lawler: "Thom Lawler did something with the small school athletic program which brought us national attention. I think the man truly represented what sports are supposed to do."

In 1984 he was inducted into the Merrimack Athletics hall of fame. Then in 1995 he was inducted in the Rome, New York sports hall of fame.

(In addition to being the head hockey coach Lawler also spent time as the Merrimack Golf coach as well as being the inaugural Men’s soccer coach during his tenure. Because of all the different job titles he had at the college he once jokingly stated “If the Zamboni broke down at 2 a.m., they called the house.")

== Personal life ==
Lawler's wife Mary and his 3 children would travel with him during the season. His son, Tom Lawler, traveled with the hockey team while he was growing up. He said Merrimack hockey was something the whole family was involved in. "That was our life.”

Lawler's son, Tom Lawler, would later join the Merrimack hockey team. He was a freshman at Merrimack when J. Thom died. He completed his four years at the college, finishing second in career points (he sits 4th as of 2018) and captaining the team in his senior season.

== Head coaching record ==
Record table
Season	Team	Overall	Conference	Standing	Postseason
Merrimack Warriors (ECAC 2) (1965–1978)
1965-66	Merrimack	8-10-1	5-5-1	4th	ECAC 2 runner up
1966-67	Merrimack	13-9-0	7-3-0	4th	ECAC 2 Champion
1967-68	Merrimack	18-8-0	12-1-0	1st	ECAC 2 Champion
1968-69	Merrimack	8-13-0	7-3-0	1st	ECAC 2 Semifinal
1969-70	Merrimack	13-13-0	9-5-0	4th	ECAC 2 Semifinal
1971-72	Merrimack	12-16-1	8-7-1	13th	
1971-72	Merrimack	16-9-0	13-5-0	5th	ECAC 2 Semifinal
1972-73	Merrimack	18-12-2	14-6-1	4th	ECAC 2 Semifinal
1973-74	Merrimack	21-13-2	15-6-2	5th	ECAC 2 Runner-Up
1974-75	Merrimack	23-8-1	22-3-1	1st	ECAC 2 Semifinal
1975-76	Merrimack	24-7-0	21-3-0	1st	ECAC 2 Runner-Up
1976-77	Merrimack	23-11-1	20-2-1	1st	ECAC 2 Champion
1977-78	Merrimack	21-9-2	16-4-1	2nd	NCAA National Champion
Merrimack:		218-138-10			
Total:		218-138-10			
National champion Postseason invitational champion Conference regular season champion Conference regular season and conference tournament champion Division regular season champion Division regular season and conference tournament champion Conference tournament champion

== See also ==
- J. Thom Lawler Rink
