= Chris Serino =

American ice hockey coach

Biographical details
- Born: August 1, 1949; Saugus, Massachusetts, U.S.
- Died: October 15, 2012 (aged 63); Boston, Massachusetts, U.S.

Coaching career (HC unless noted)
- 1980–1987: Saugus High School
- 1988–1991: Northfield Mount Hermon School
- 1991–1998: New Hampshire (assistant)
- 1998–2005: Merrimack
- 2005–2012: Malden Catholic High School

Head coaching record
- Overall: 78–149–27 (college)

Christie Serino Jr. (August 1, 1949 – October 15, 2012) was an American ice hockey coach who worked for various college and high school programs over a 32-year span. His career peaked as the head coach for Merrimack for seven seasons.

== Career ==
Serino started his coaching career with Saugus High School in his home town of Saugus, Massachusetts, heading the program for seven seasons. In 1988, he became the bench boss for Northfield Mount Hermon School and remained there for three years before he accepted an offer to become an assistant coach at New Hampshire under Dick Umile. Serino served in that capacity until 1998, when he became the head coach for Merrimack. When he took over the program the Warriors had not had a winning season since joining Hockey East in 1989 and during his entire 7-year tenure that trend continued. Merrimack never finished above 7th place in the conference and lost every Hockey East tournament game they played. In his final season, Serino had by far his worst record, going 1–22–1 in the conference and missing the tournament. Unconfirmed reports at the time asserted that the players on the team had asked Serino to resign as head coach, which he did do after the season, but not before he accepted a move back to the High School ranks, this time at Malden Catholic. Serino remained the head coach for Malden until his death in 2012 as a result of throat cancer, a disease he had been diagnosed with in 2001.

== Head coaching record ==
=== College ice hockey ===
Record table
Season	Team	Overall	Conference	Standing	Postseason
Merrimack Warriors (Hockey East) (1998–2005)
1998–99	Merrimack	11–24–1	7–16–1	8th	Hockey East Quarterfinals
1999–00	Merrimack	11–19–6	6–12–6	7th	Hockey East Quarterfinals
2000–01	Merrimack	14–20–4	7–14–3	8th	Hockey East Quarterfinals
2001–02	Merrimack	11–23–2	6–16–2	8th	Hockey East Quarterfinals
2002–03	Merrimack	12–18–6	7–13–4	7th	Hockey East Quarterfinals
2003–04	Merrimack	11–19–6	6–12–6	7th	Hockey East Quarterfinals
2004–05	Merrimack	8–26–2	1–22–1	9th	
Merrimack:		78–149–27	40–105–23		
Total:		78–149–27			
National champion Postseason invitational champion Conference regular season champion Conference regular season and conference tournament champion Division regular season champion Division regular season and conference tournament champion Conference tournament champion
