= Merrimack College =

Private college in North Andover, Massachusetts, US

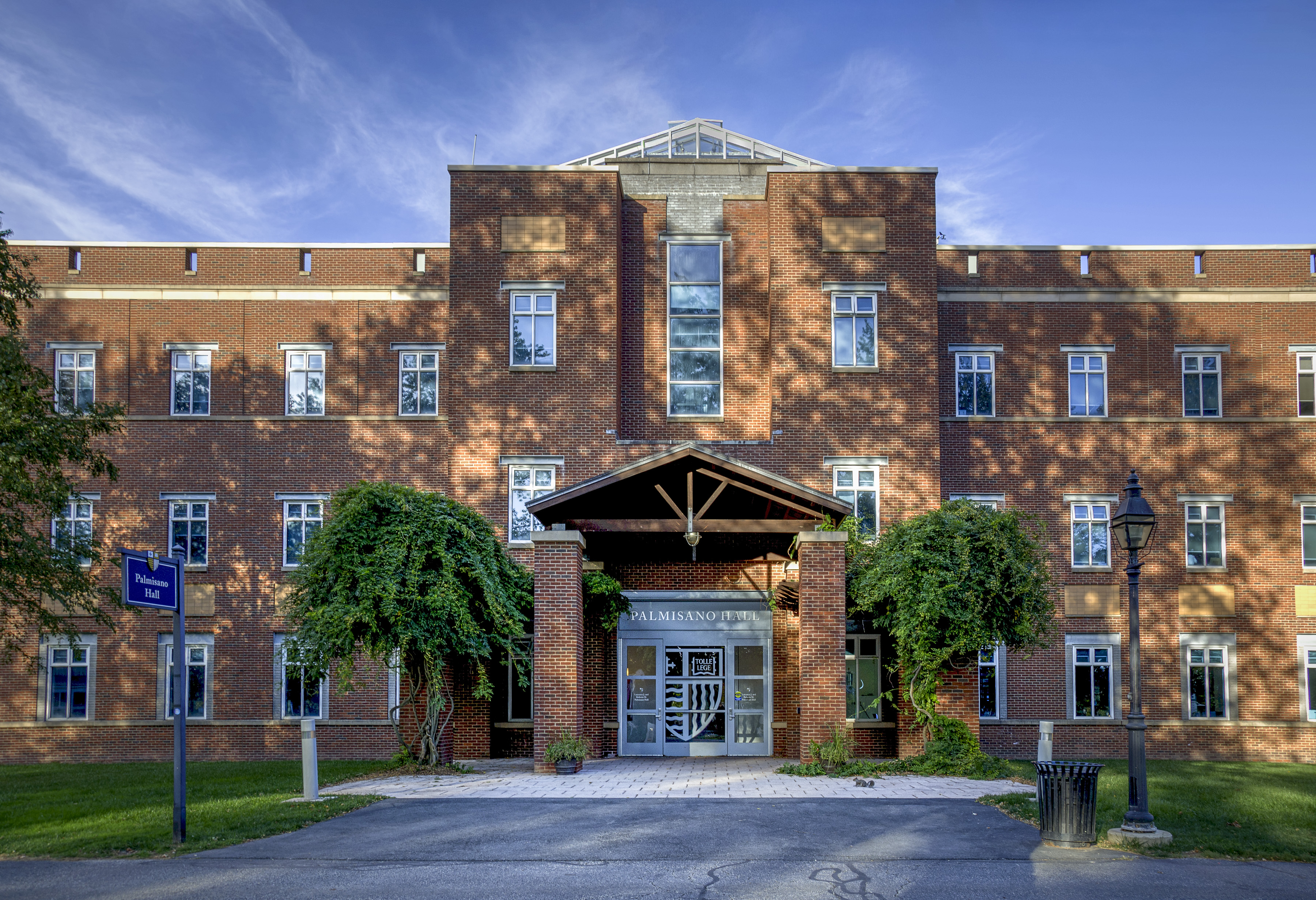
- Palmisano Hall
- Motto: Per Scientiam Ad Sapientiam (Latin)
- Motto in English: Through Knowledge to Wisdom
- Type: Private university
- Established: 1947
- Religious affiliation: Catholic (Order of Saint Augustine)
- Academic affiliations: NAICU; ACCU
- Endowment: $97.4 million (2025)
- President: Christopher E. Hopey
- Students: 5,862 (fall 2024)
- Undergraduates: 4,102 (fall 2024)
- Postgraduates: 1,760 (fall 2024)
- Location: North Andover, Massachusetts, U.S. 42.667°N 71.123°W
- Campus: Suburban, 220 acres (89 ha)
- Newspaper: The Beacon
- Colors: Navy blue & gold
- Nickname: Warriors
- Sporting affiliations: NCAA Division I MAAC; Hockey East (men's and women's ice hockey)
- Mascot: Mack the Warrior
- Website: merrimack.edu

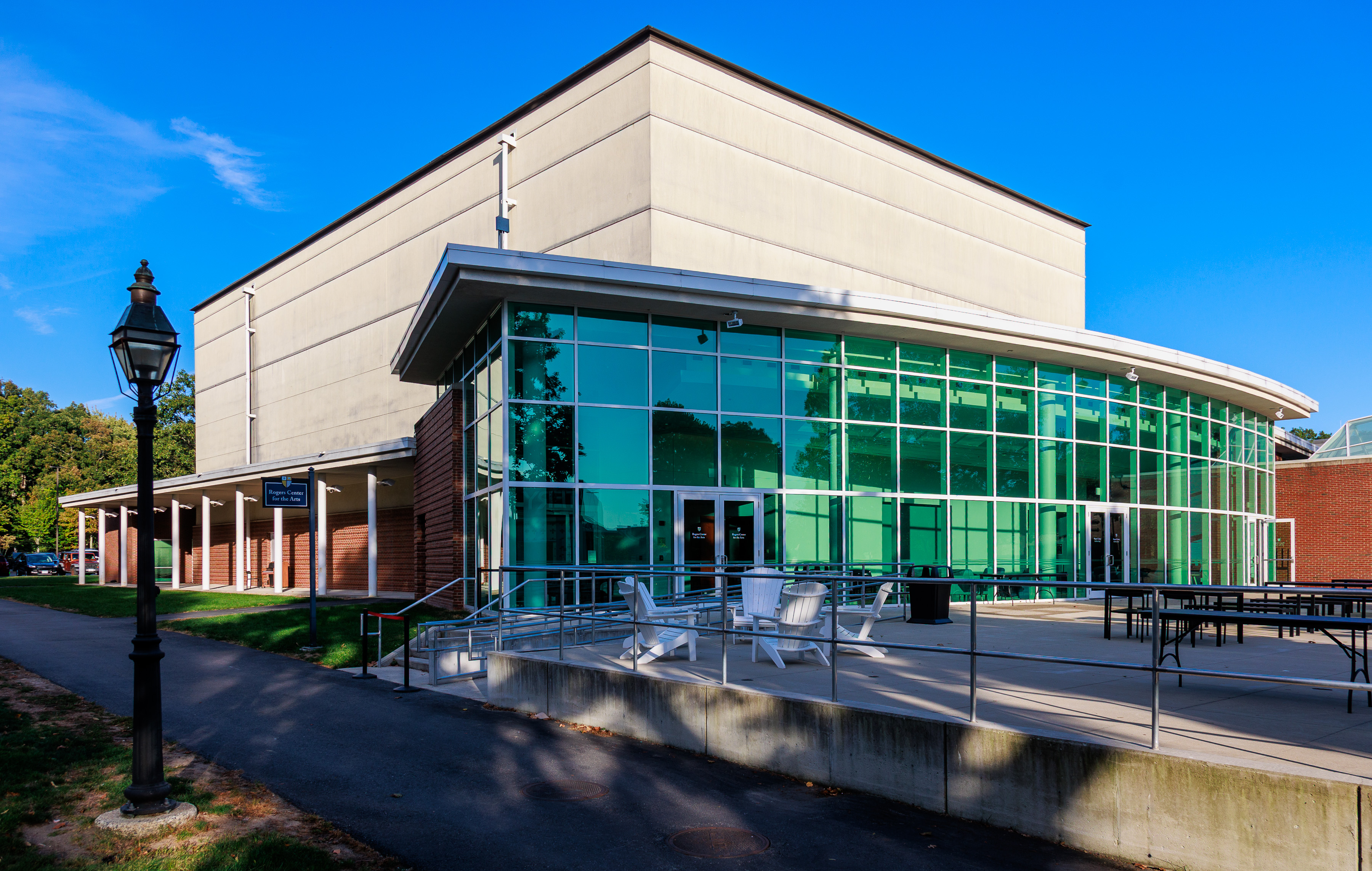
Rogers Center for the Arts

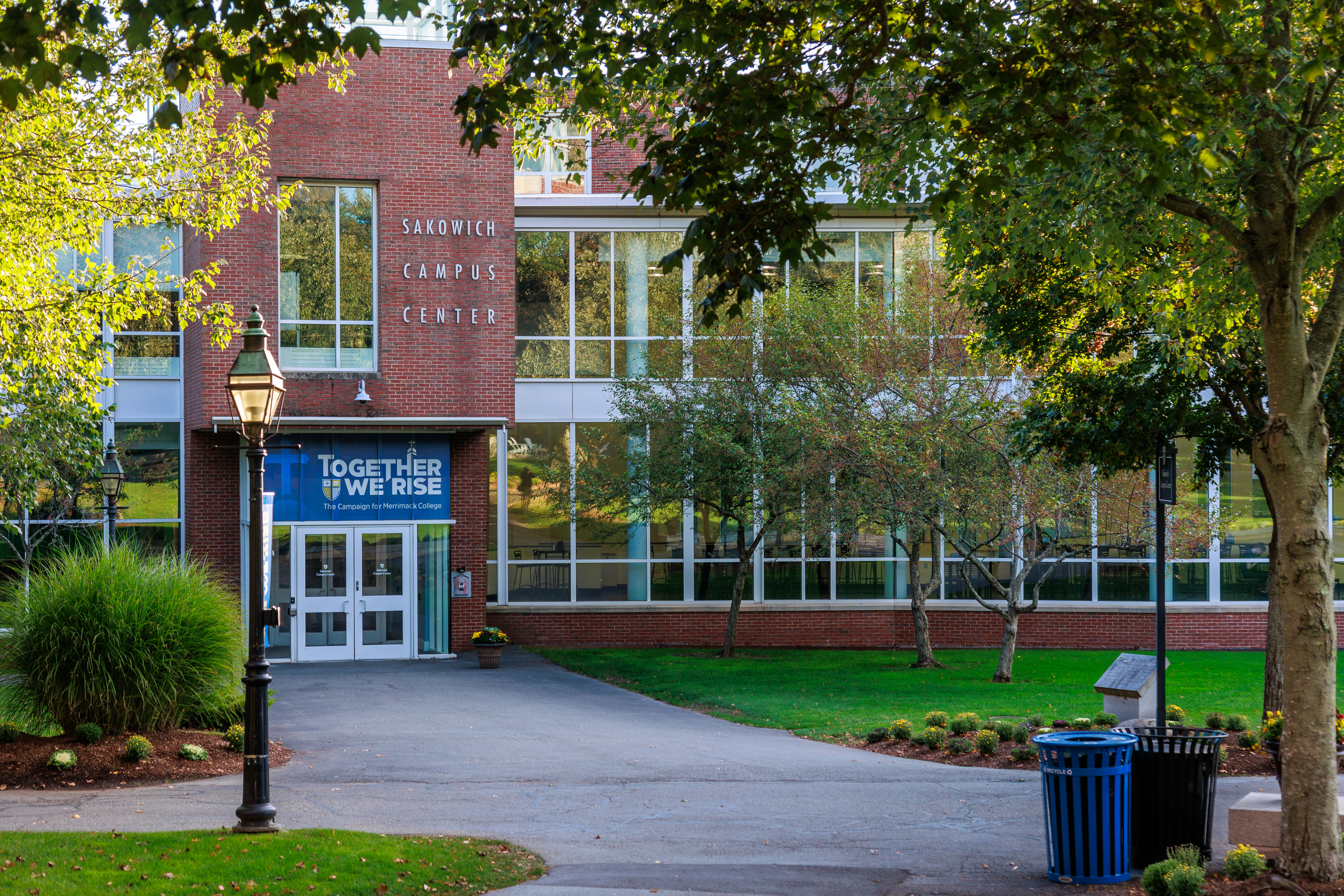
Sakowich Campus Center

Merrimack College is a private Augustinian university in North Andover, Massachusetts. It was founded in 1947 by the Order of St. Augustine with an initial goal to educate World War II veterans. It enrolls approximately 5,700 undergraduate and graduate students from 34 states and 36 countries.

== History ==
Merrimack College was established in 1947 by the Order of Saint Augustine following an invitation by the Archbishop of Boston, Richard Cushing. It is the second Augustinian affiliated college in the United States after Villanova University. Church leaders saw a need to create a liberal arts college largely in a commuter school format for veterans returning from World War II. Archbishop Cushing charged Augustinian priest Vincent McQuade to lead the college. McQuade was a native of Lawrence, Massachusetts, and longtime friend of Cushing. McQuade joined the effort after working on the faculty at Villanova working with veterans transitioning home from the war. McQuade organized the creation process, including land purchases and zoning, securing a charter from the state, establishing curriculum, and managing the college's campus construction. The Commonwealth of Massachusetts granted a charter to The Augustinian College of the Merrimack Valley in March 1947 and the college officially opened in September of the same year.

=== Presidents ===
Merrimack College has had eight presidents since it was founded in 1947:

1. Vincent A. McQuade, 1947–1968 (founder)
2. John R. Aherne, 1968–1976
3. John A. Coughlan, 1976–1981
4. John E. Deegan, 1981–1994
5. Richard J. Santagati, 1994–2008
6. Joseph D. Calderone, 2008–2008
7. Ronald O. Champagne, 2008–2010
8. Christopher E. Hopey, 2010–present

== Academics ==
Academic rankings

Regional
- U.S. News & World Report: 33

Merrimack College offers more than 100 undergraduate academic programs and more than 40 graduate programs including accelerated master's degrees.

The College's five schools include the Girard School of Business, the Winston School of Education and Social Policy, the School of Arts and Sciences, the School of Engineering and Computational Sciences, and the School of Nursing and Health Sciences.

== Campus ==
The main campus of Merrimack College is situated on 220 acres (1 km^{2}) of land in North Andover, Massachusetts, a suburb 25 miles north of downtown Boston. The main campus features over 40 buildings, including a 125,000-volume library; several classroom buildings, including the School of Engineering and Computational Sciences complex; Palmisano Hall; the Sakowich Campus Center; the Rogers Center for the Arts; the Merrimack Athletic Complex; Austin Hall, which houses administrative offices; the Collegiate Church of Christ the Teacher; student apartment buildings and residence halls. Additionally, Merrimack owns several properties outside of the main campus, including the Louis H. Hamel Health Center and Saint Ambrose Friary (located across Elm Street from the bulk of campus). The library is named after McQuade, the college's founder. The college’s academic buildings, as well as the church and Austin Hall, are generally fronted towards Route 114, with the residence halls, athletic facilities and campus center lying further back.

In 2017, the college received a $29.7 million tax-exempt bond from MassDevelopment. Merrimack designated several major projects for the funds, including construction of two academic buildings and three residence halls; renovations to renovate O’Reilly Hall, McQuade Library, and several other campus buildings; and upgrades to athletic facilities.

The campus has undergone rapid growth and expansion in the 2010s and 2020s, beginning with the construction of two residence halls in 2015 and two academic buildings in 2017 and 2019 on their main campus. They purchased two office buildings on Route 114 in 2022, which became home to their School of Engineering and Computational Sciences. Two more residence halls and an academic building broke ground in 2024. In 2025, Merrimack College purchased the 76 acre Royal Crest apartment complex, located across Route 114 from the main campus, and 305 North Main Street in Andover.

== Student life ==
Student body composition as of May 2, 2022
Race and ethnicity	Total
White	78%
Hispanic	8%
Black	4%
Asian	2%
Foreign national	2%
Other (Note: Other consists of multiracial Americans and those who prefer not to say.)	2%
Economic diversity
Low-income (Note: The percentage of students who received an income-based federal Pell grant intended for low-income students.)	16%
Affluent (Note: The percentage of students who are a part of the American middle class at the bare minimum.)	84%

=== Athletics ===
Logo of Merrimack Warriors

The athletic teams, except for ice hockey, men's lacrosse, and men's volleyball participate in the Metro Atlantic Athletic Conference of NCAA Division I. They began their four-year transition from Division II to Division I during the 2019–20 season and have been full Division I members since the 2023–24 season.

During the college's transition to Division I, it added varsity programs in women's bowling, men's volleyball, men's golf, and dance, bringing the total number of teams participating in intercollegiate sport to 28 (12 men's teams and 16 women's teams). The men's and women's college ice hockey programs are currently NCAA Division I programs, participating in the Hockey East conference.

== Notable alumni ==
Entertainment/Media

- Billy Costa - radio and television host
- Charlie Day - actor and comedian
- Kelly Lange - television news reporter
- Sally Ann Freedman - beauty queen and professional model

Education

Robert Keating O'Neill - American librarian, archivist and historian.

Business

- Richard Potember - inventor and engineer
- Bob Unanue - CEO of Goya Foods
- Brian C. Mitchell - American academic administrator
- John F. Carney - civil engineer

Politics

- Marc Lombardo - Massachusetts state representative
- Barbara L'Italien - Massachusetts state representative and former member of the senate
- Steven Angelo - Massachusetts state representative
- Christopher Fallon - Massachusetts state representative
- Brian Cresta - Massachusetts state representative
- Vincent Lozzi - Massachusetts state representative
- Regina Birdsell - New Hampshire senator and state representative
- David Doherty - New Hampshire state representative
- T. J. Donovan - former attorney general of Vermont
- Paul V. Kelly - former Assistant Secretary of State for Legislative Affairs
- Adam J. Satchell - Rhode Island senate member

Athletics

- Carl Yastrzemski - baseball player
- Ryan O'Rourke - baseball player and coach
- Brian Murphy - baseball coach
- Joe Gallo - basketball coach
- Jordan Minor - basketball player
- Ed Murphy - basketball player
- Bill Herrion - basketball coach
- Greg Herenda - basketball coach
- Tom Herrion - basketball coach
- Gelvis Solano - basketball player
- Darren Duncan - basketball player
- Juvaris Hayes - basketball player
- Nolan Godfrey - Lacrosse player
- Anthony Aquino - ice hockey player
- Chris Barton - ice hockey player
- Will Calverley - ice hockey player
- Joe Cannata - ice hockey player
- Declan Carlile - ice hockey player
- Greg Classen - ice hockey player
- Mike Collins - ice hockey player
- Mark Cornforth - ice hockey player
- Billy Costa - ice hockey player
- Stéphane Da Costa - ice hockey player
- Collin Delia - ice hockey player
- Mike Doneghey - ice hockey player
- Joe Exter - ice hockey player
- Teal Fowler - ice hockey player
- Matt Foy - ice hockey player
- Jim Hrivnak - ice hockey player
- John Jakopin - ice hockey player
- Bob Jay - ice hockey player
- Alex Jefferies - ice hockey player
- Johnathan Kovacevic - ice hockey player
- Steve McKenna - ice hockey player
- Hugo Ollas - ice hockey player
- Kris Porter - ice hockey player
- Rob Ricci - ice hockey player
- Marco Rosa - ice hockey player
- Bryan Schmidt - ice hockey player
- Darrel Scoville - ice hockey player
- Brett Seney - ice hockey player
- Karl Stollery - ice hockey player
- Rejean Stringer - ice hockey player
- Mike Vaskivuo - ice hockey player
- Jim Vesey - ice hockey player
- Jason Wolfe - ice hockey player
- Shawn Loiseau - football player
- Joe Clancy - football player and coach
- Carly Muscaro - Olympic runner
- Frank T. Monahan - basketball coach
