= List of NCAA Division II men's ice hockey seasons =

List of NCAA Division II men's ice hockey seasons contains all seasons of Division II men's ice hockey and the champions of each respective season.

== Schism ==
In 1964, after three years of existence, the 29-team conference ECAC Hockey was split in two. This was done partly due to its ponderous size but also because many of the programs in the conference were competing with differing levels of investment. The conference was divided between teams that, in essence, had indoor, artificial-ice arenas and those that didn't. A special provision was made for a few programs but by and large the 14 teams that were placed in ECAC 2 either couldn't or wouldn't fund their programs to a level where they could compete with the upper-echelon programs. The split resulted in the first official delineation of divisions in college ice hockey.

At the start there was no NCAA-sponsored tournament. Between the two extant conferences (ECAC 2 and MIAC) only ECAC 2 played a conference tournament, making the ECAC champion a de facto College Division champion (the MIAC would not hold a conference tournament until 1986).

No.	Season	Finish	De Facto Champion (number)	Champion Record
1	1964–65	-	None	-
2	1965–66	March 12	Colby (Note: Boston State, an independent program, finished their season with a 20–0 record. They are sometimes credited as the College Division champion for 1966.)	13–12–1
3	1966–67	March 11	Merrimack	13–9–0
4	1967–68	March 9	Merrimack (2)	18–8–0
5	1968–69	March 8	American International	15–8–0
6	1969–70	March 14	Vermont	16–8–0
7	1970–71	March 13	Bowdoin	19–4–1

== Second Schism ==
Less than a decade after splitting from ECAC Hockey, ECAC 2 had swollen to more than 30 teams and a further, lower division was made (ECAC 3). ECAC 3 began its conference tournament immediately, however, as they were lower-tier than their parent conference, the ECAC 2 champion was still the de facto College Division champion.

In 1973 the NCAA reclassified its sporting divisions numerically. The first official Division II season was 1973–74 yet no second-tier national championship was held until 1978.

No.	Season	Finish	De Facto Champion (number)	Champion Record
8	1971–72	March 11	Massachusetts	19–7–0
9	1972–73	March 10	Vermont (2)	24–7–0
10	1973–74	March 9	Vermont (3)	28–5–0
11	1974–75	March 8	Bowdoin (2)	14–9–0
12	1975–76	March 6	Bowdoin (3)	18–9–0
13	1976–77	March 16	Merrimack (3)	23–11–1

== Tournament Play Begins ==
The NCAA began holding a lower-tier national tournament in 1978. While most of the teams that played as Division II ice hockey programs actually belonged to schools who were classified as Division III, due to the relatively small number of programs the NCAA did not require the teams to be D-II.

The NAIA had been holding an ice hockey tournament since 1968 which was used mostly by western schools. With the advent of the NCAA tournament many western programs began to gravitate back to the NCAA and eventually caused the discontinuation of the NAIA Championship.

In 1983 the NCAA created a championship for the Division III level and began requiring that teams participate only in the championships at their level. Due to the low numbers of teams at the Division II level, the D-II tournament survived for only one more season before being discontinued.

No.	Season	Tournament	Start	Finish	NCAA Champion (number)	Champion Conference	Champion Record	Championship Site
14	1977–78	1978		March 18	Merrimack	ECAC 2	(21–9–2)	Springfield, Massachusetts
15	1978–79	1979		March 17	Lowell	ECAC 2	(27–6–0)	North Andover, Massachusetts
16	1979–80	1980		March 15	Mankato State	Independent	(30–9–1)	Elmira, New York
17	1980–81	1981		March 14	Lowell (2)	ECAC 2	(27–5–0)	North Andover, Massachusetts
18	1981–82	1982		March 20	Lowell (3)	ECAC 2	(31–4–0)	North Billerica, Massachusetts
19	1982–83	1983		March 19	RIT	ECAC 2	(23–9–0)	North Billerica, Massachusetts
20	1983–84	1984		March 18	Bemidji State	NCHA	(31–0–0)	Bemidji, Minnesota

== Tournament Returns ==
The NCAA agreed to restart the NCAA tournament due to increased interest from Division II programs. With no D-II conferences, the selection committee was left with only the overall records of teams to use when deciding the participants. Bemidji State participated in the first 6 championships, winning 4, but by 1998 most of the teams at the Division II level had left to join the top division, leaving the second tier with just a handful of programs and the tournament was, once again, discontinued.

No.	Season	Tournament	Start	Finish	NCAA Champion (number)	Champion Conference	Champion Record	Championship Site
21	1992–93	1993		March 20	Bemidji State (2)	NCHA	(24–7–0)	Bemidji, Minnesota
22	1993–94	1994		March 12	Bemidji State (3)	NCHA	(22–10–3)	Huntsville, Alabama
23	1994–95	1995		March 18	Bemidji State (4)	NCHA	(25–7–2)	Erie, Pennsylvania
24	1995–96	1996		March 9	Alabama–Huntsville	Independent	(26–0–3)	Huntsville, Alabama
25	1996–97	1997		March 15	Bemidji State (5)	NCHA	(25–7–2)	Bemidji, Minnesota
26	1997–98	1998		March 14	Alabama–Huntsville (2)	Independent	(24–3–3)	Huntsville, Alabama
27	1998–99	1999		March 13	Saint Michael's	ECAC Northeast	(16–10–2)	Colchester, Vermont

== Northeast 10 ==
After the NCAA Division II tournament was discontinued in 1999, the few remaining D-II programs were barred from participating in conference tournaments in order for those conferences to retain automatic qualifiers. As a result, the eastern teams began holding a separate cross-conference tournament. This arrangement continued until the teams formally created the ice hockey division of the Northeast 10 in 2009. Because there were no Division II teams outside the conference there was no need for the NCAA to resurrect the National Championship leaving the tournament champion as the de facto Division II champion.

No.	Season	Start	Finish	De Facto Champion (number)	Champion Record
28	2009–10	November 3	March 6	Saint Anselm	(15–11–1)
29	2010–11	October 29	March 5	Saint Anselm (2)	(13–11–2)
30	2011–12	October 22	March 3	Saint Anselm (3)	(14–8–5)
31	2012–13	October 26	March 2	Saint Anselm (4)	(16–8–3)
32	2013–14	November 1	March 1	Southern New Hampshire	(17–8–1)
33	2014–15	October 31	February 28	Saint Anselm (5)	(11–13–3)
34	2015–16	October 23	February 27	Stonehill	(13–9–4)
35	2016–17	October 28	February 25	Saint Anselm (6)	(12–12–2)
36	2017–18	October 27	March 3	Saint Anselm (7)	(17–9–1)
37	2018–19	October 26	March 2	Southern New Hampshire (2)	(16–13–2)
38	2019–20	November 1	March 7	Stonehill (2)	(13–11–5)
39	2020–21	February 5	March 14	None (Note: Only Franklin Pierce played during the season due to COVID-19 concerns.)	N/A
40	2021–22	October 17	March 3	Assumption	(16–12–2)
41	2022–23	October 15	March 4	Saint Anselm (8)	(18–8–2)
42	2023–24	October 14	March 2	Assumption (2)	(25–7–0)
43	2024–25	October 25	March 1	Saint Michael's	(18–11–2)

== See also ==
- List of NCAA Division II men's ice hockey champions
- List of NCAA Division I men's ice hockey seasons
- List of NCAA Division III men's ice hockey seasons
