= Don Brose =

American ice hockey coach

Biographical details
- Born: 1940 (age 85–86); St. Louis Park, Minnesota

Coaching career (HC unless noted)
- 1958–1962: Concordia College
- 1969–1983: Minnesota State
- 1984–2000: Minnesota State

Head coaching record
- Overall: 539–362–78 (.590)

Accomplishments and honors

Championships
- NCAA Division II National Champion (1980); 4× NCHA Champion (1981, 1986, 1987, 1991)

Awards
- 1979 Edward Jeremiah Award; 1987 NCHA Coach of the Year; 2000 WCHA Coach of the Year; 2004 John MacInnes Award; 2006 Minnesota State Hall of Fame

Don Brose is a retired American ice hockey coach. Brose was the head coach at Minnesota State University, Mankato from 1969 to 2000. He previously served as the head coach at Concordia College (Minnesota) from 1958 to 1962. In 34 years as a head coach, Brose compiled a record of 540 wins, 363 losses, and 79 ties. At the end of the 2009–2010 hockey season, Brose ranked 14th all-time among college men's ice hockey coaches.

== Career ==
Brose began his coaching career at Concordia College in Moorhead, Minnesota. Brose's Concordia teams won only four games in four years. He was an undergraduate student while coaching at Concordia, receiving a bachelor's degree in 1962, and also playing on the ice hockey, baseball and football clubs. Brose also received a master's degree from the University of Maryland, College Park and then joined the staff of the Mankato State College athletic department.

When Mankato State established a men's ice hockey program in 1969, Brose was given the task of building the program from the ground up. After an uninspiring inaugural year, the Mankato Mavericks dominated the competition in 1970–71, going 15–2–1 as an Independent. Over the next 20 years under Brose, Mankato State had only one losing season. When the first NCAA Division II Men's Ice Hockey Championship was held in 1978, the recently rechristened Mankato State University was a part of it, finishing in third place. The next year, the Mavericks were again invited to the tournament and finished in second place. During the 1979–80 season, the Mavericks recorded their first 30-win season and won the Division II National Championship.

Brose coached the Mavericks to the Division II tournament three more times and led the team into the NCHA conference. Brose took a year off during the 1983–84 season and returned to the team the following year. Upon his return, the Division II ranking collapsed due to a lack of sponsoring colleges, necessitating both Mankato State and their conference to drop down to Division III. The Mavericks continued to excel during this time, winning three regular season conference titles and making the Division III tournament five time (the final four three times) in eight seasons. When the Division II level was re-established for the 1992–93 season, Mankato State left the NCHA to play at the Division II level. Beginning in the 1996–97 season, Mankato State jumped to Division I as an independent.

In Mankato State's first season in Division I, Brose led the team to a 17–14–3 mark. Due to Northern Michigan leaving the WCHA after the 1996–97 season, Mankato State was invited to participate in the conference tournament despite not being a full member. With the Mavericks set to officially join the conference for the 1999–00 season, Brose delayed his retirement so that he could remain with the program as it became acclimated to the new conference. In his final season with the program, Brose led the newly renamed Minnesota State to a fourth-place finish in the conference and helped them advance out of the first round for the first time, receiving the WCHA Coach of the Year honors, as much for the season as his body of work leading up to his final year. He was replaced the following year by former assistant Troy Jutting.

In 2004, Brose was awarded the John MacInnes Award by the American Collegiate Hockey Association. He was inducted into the Minnesota State Hall of Fame in 2006.

== Head coaching record ==
The following tables list coaching details.

Record table
Season	Team	Overall	Conference	Standing	Postseason
Concordia Cobbers (WCHA) (2000–2012)
1958–59	Concordia	1–7–0			
1959–60	Concordia	0–9–0			
1960–61	Concordia	2–7–0			
1961–62	Concordia	1–5–0			
Concordia:		4–28–0			
Mankato State Mavericks Independent (1969–1981)
1969–70	Mankato State	5–8–1			
1970–71	Mankato State	15–2–1			
1971–72	Mankato State	13–6–1			
1972–73	Mankato State	14–4–1			
1973–74	Mankato State	8–11–2			
1974–75	Mankato State	14–8–0			
1975–76	Mankato State	20–11–1			
1976–77	Mankato State	17–10–1			
1977–78	Mankato State	17–16–1			NCAA Third Place Game (Win)
1978–79	Mankato State	25–12–1			NCAA Runner-Up
1979–80	Mankato State	30–9–1			NCAA National Champion
Mankato State:		178–97–12			
Mankato State Mavericks (NCHA (D-II)) (1980–1983)
1980–81	Mankato State	28–11–3	11-5-0	1st	NCAA Third Place Game (Win)
1981–82	Mankato State	22–9–1	11–6–1	2nd	NCAA Quarterfinals
1982–83	Mankato State	26–10–1	14–5–1	T–2nd	NCAA Quarterfinals
Mankato State:		76–30–5	36–16–2		
Mankato State Mavericks (NCHA (D-III)) (1984–1992)
1984–85	Mankato State	19–12–4	8–7–3	3rd	NCAA Quarterfinals
1985–86	Mankato State	26–9–3	11–5–2	T–1st	NCAA Third Place Game (Loss)
1986–87	Mankato State	21–10–1	13–6–1	T–1st	NCHA Semifinals
1987–88	Mankato State	18–11–3	14–8–2	4th	NCHA Semifinals
1988–89	Mankato State	13–13–4	10–10–4	5th	NCHA Semifinals
1989–90	Mankato State	15–14–8	13–9–2	3rd	NCAA Frozen Four
1990–91	Mankato State	23–7–6	16–3–5	T–1st	NCAA Runner-Up
1991–92	Mankato State	17–14–3	11–7–2	3rd	NCAA Quarterfinals
Mankato State:		152–90–32	96–55–21		
Mankato State Mavericks (Independent (D-II)) (1992–1996)
1992–93	Mankato State	12–17–7			
1993–94	Mankato State	11–15–1			
1994–95	Mankato State	19–12–0			
1995–96	Mankato State	16–12–4			
Mankato State:		58–56–12			
Mankato State Mavericks (Independent (D-I)) (1996–1999)
1996–97	Mankato State	17–14–3			
1997–98	Mankato State	15–17–6			WCHA First Round
1998–99	Mankato State	18–16–5			WCHA First Round
Mankato State:		50–47–14			
Minnesota State-Mankato Mavericks (WCHA) (1999–2000)
1999–00	Minnesota State-Mankato	21–14–4	15–10–3	4th	WCHA Quarterfinal
Minnesota State-Mankato:		21–14–4	15–10–3		
Total:		539–362–78			
National champion Postseason invitational champion Conference regular season champion Conference regular season and conference tournament champion Division regular season champion Division regular season and conference tournament champion Conference tournament champion

== See also ==
- List of college men's ice hockey coaches with 400 wins

Awards and achievements
Preceded by Sid Watson	Edward Jeremiah Award; 1978–79	Succeeded by Steve Stirling
Preceded by Dean Blais	WCHA Coach of the Year; 1999–2000	Succeeded by Dean Blais
