= List of Mercyhurst Lakers men's ice hockey seasons =

This is a season-by-season list of records compiled by Mercyhurst in men's ice hockey.

Mercyhurst University has made three appearances in the NCAA Tournament, losing each game it has participated in. The Lakers have also played in two Division II finals but lost all four games they played.

== Season-by-season results ==
Note: GP = Games played, W = Wins, L = Losses, T = Ties

NCAA D-I Champions	NCAA Frozen Four	Conference regular season champions	Conference Playoff Champions

Season	Conference	Regular season (Note: Code explanation; GP—Games Played, W—Wins, L—Losses, T—Tied games, OTW—Overtime Wins, OTL—Overtime Loses, 3/SW—Win in 3 on 3 overtime or shootout, Pts—Points*)														Conference Tournament Results	National Tournament Results
Season	Conference	Conference									Overall					Conference Tournament Results	National Tournament Results
Season	Conference	GP	W	L	T	OTW	OTL	3/SW	Pts*	Finish	GP	W	L	T	%	Conference Tournament Results	National Tournament Results
Division III
Fred Lane (1987–1988)
1987–88	Independent	–	–	–	–	–	–	–	–	–	23	16	7	0	.696		
Rick Gotkin (1988–2026)
1988–89	ECAC West	20	6	13	1	–	–	–	.325	–	28	11	16	1	.411		
1989–90	ECAC West	21	16	3	2	–	–	–	.810	3rd	30	18	8	4	.667	Won Quarterfinal, 5–4 (Union); Lost Semifinal, 2–3 (Geneseo State)	
1990–91	ECAC West	19	16	3	0	–	–	–	.842	2nd	32	19	12	1	.609	Won Quarterfinal, 5–2 (Cortland State); Won Semifinal, 4–1 (RIT); Lost Championship, 3–6 (Elmira)	Lost Quarterfinal series 1–2 (Elmira)
1991–92	ECAC West	21	13	8	0	–	–	–	.619	3rd	31	19	12	0	.613	Won Quarterfinal, 8–2 (Oswego State); Won Semifinal, 3–0 (Elmira); Lost Championship, 3–6 (Plattsburgh State)	
Division II
1992–93	ECAC West	18	15	3	0	–	–	–	.833	2nd	28	18	10	0	.643	Lost Semifinal 3–5 (Canisius)	Lost NCAA Championship series, 0–2 (Bemidji State)
1993–94	ECAC West	10	6	4	0	–	–	–	12	T–3rd	25	12	13	0	.480	Lost Semifinal 3–5 (Elmira)	
1994–95	ECAC West	8	6	1	1	–	–	–	13	1st	28	23	3	2	.857	Won Semifinal, 5–4 (Elmira); Won Championship, 9–2 (RIT)	Lost NCAA Championship series, 0–2 (Bemidji State)
1995–96	ECAC West	8	5	3	0	–	–	–	10	3rd	27	18	7	2	.704	Lost Semifinal, 2–6 (Canisius)	
1996–97	ECAC West	10	5	4	1	–	–	–	11	4th	27	16	9	2	.630	Lost Semifinal, 5–8 (Elmira)	
1997–98	ECAC West	10	4	5	1	–	–	–	9	T–3rd	27	17	9	1	.648	Lost Semifinal, 0–3 (RIT)	
1998–99	ECAC West	6	2	3	1	–	–	–	5	3rd	28	16	10	2	.607	Won Semifinal, 7–4 (Elmira); Lost Championship, 1–6 (RIT)	
Division I
1999–00	MAAC	27	19	6	2	–	–	–	40	2nd	37	23	10	4	.676	Won Quarterfinal, 10–3 (Holy Cross); Lost Semifinal, 1–6 (Connecticut)	
2000–01	MAAC	26	19	6	1	–	–	–	39	1st	36	22	12	2	.639	Won Quarterfinal, 10–5 (Fairfield); Won Semifinal, 4–3 (Canisius); Won Championship, 6–5 (Quinnipiac)	Lost Regional Quarterfinal, 3–4 (Michigan)
2001–02	MAAC	26	21	2	3	–	–	–	45	1st	37	24	10	3	.689	Won Quarterfinal, 2–1 (Army); Won Semifinal, 5–0 (Connecticut); Lost Championship, 4–6 (Quinnipiac)	
2002–03	MAAC	26	19	5	2	–	–	–	40	1st	37	22	13	2	.622	Won Quarterfinal, 5–3 (Iona); Won Semifinal, 10–2 (Bentley); Won Championship, 4–3 (Quinnipiac)	Lost Regional semifinal, 2–9 (Minnesota)
2003–04	Atlantic Hockey	24	16	7	1	–	–	–	33	2nd	36	20	14	2	.583	Won Quarterfinal, 5–4 (Bentley); Lost Semifinal, 2–3 (Sacred Heart)	
2004–05	Atlantic Hockey	24	14	7	3	–	–	–	31	T–2nd	38	18	16	4	.526	Won Quarterfinal, 7–4 (Connecticut); Won Semifinal, 4–3 (OT) (Holy Cross); Won Championship, 3–2 (OT) (Quinnipiac)	Lost Regional semifinal, 4–5 (Boston College)
2005–06	Atlantic Hockey	28	19	8	1	–	–	–	39	2nd	36	22	13	1	.625	Won Quarterfinal, 7–2 (Canisius); Lost Semifinal, 2–3 (2OT) (Bentley)	
2006–07	Atlantic Hockey	28	9	15	4	–	–	–	22	T–7th	35	9	20	6	.343	Lost Quarterfinal, 4–5 (Connecticut)	
2007–08	Atlantic Hockey	28	11	10	7	–	–	–	29	5th	41	15	19	7	.451	Won Quarterfinal series, 2–0 (Canisius); Won Four vs. Five, 4–1 (Sacred Heart); Won Semifinal, 4–2 (Army); Lost Championship, 4–5 (OT) (Air Force)	
2008–09	Atlantic Hockey	28	17	8	3	–	–	–	37	3rd	40	22	15	3	.588	Won Quarterfinal series, 2–0 (Army); Won Semifinal, 5–4 (OT) (RIT); Lost Championship, 0–2 (Air Force)	
2009–10	Atlantic Hockey	28	15	10	3	–	–	–	33	4th	38	15	20	3	.434	Lost Quarterfinal series, 0–2 (Canisius)	
2010–11	Atlantic Hockey	27	12	13	2	–	–	–	26	7th	37	15	18	4	.459	Won First round, 0–2 (Robert Morris); Lost Quarterfinal series, 0–2 (Connecticut)	
2011–12	Atlantic Hockey	27	15	8	4	–	–	–	34	T–3rd	40	20	16	4	.550	Won Quarterfinal series, 2–1 (Holy Cross); Lost Semifinal, 2–5 (Air Force)	
2012–13	Atlantic Hockey	27	12	11	4	–	–	–	28	6th	41	19	17	5	.524	Won First round series, 2–0 (Army); Won Quarterfinal series, 2–1 (Holy Cross); Won Semifinal, 4–1 (Connecticut); Lost Championship, 2–7 (Canisius)	
2013–14	Atlantic Hockey	27	17	4	6	–	–	–	40	1st	41	21	13	7	.598	Won Quarterfinal series, 2–0 (Holy Cross); Lost Semifinal, 4–5 (2OT) (Canisius)	
2014–15	Atlantic Hockey	28	14	11	3	–	–	–	31	5th	39	19	16	4	.538	Won Quarterfinal series, 2–1 (Bentley); Won Semifinal, 4–3 (OT) (Robert Morris); Lost Championship, 1–5 (RIT)	
2015–16	Atlantic Hockey	28	15	9	4	–	–	–	34	4th	36	17	15	4	.528	Lost Quarterfinal series, 2–0 (RIT)	
2016–17	Atlantic Hockey	28	11	13	4	–	–	–	26	T–6th	39	15	20	4	.436	Won First round series, 2–0 (American International); Lost Quarterfinal series, 1–2 (Army)	
2017–18	Atlantic Hockey	28	16	8	4	–	–	–	36	1st	37	21	12	4	.622	Won Quarterfinal series, 2–0 (Sacred Heart); Lost Semifinal, 4–5 (OT) (Robert Morris)	
2018–19	Atlantic Hockey	28	11	13	4	–	–	–	26	7th	38	13	20	5	.408	Lost First round series, 0–2 (Army)	
2019–20	Atlantic Hockey	28	3	23	2	–	–	0	11	11th	36	5	29	2	.167	Lost First round series, 0–2 (Air Force)	
2020–21	Atlantic Hockey	16	7	8	1	1	1	1	.479	7th	21	8	12	1	.405	Lost First round, 2–3 (Niagara)	
2021–22	Atlantic Hockey	26	10	12	4	0	1	1	36	7th	39	16	19	4	.462	Won First round series, 2–0 (Holy Cross); Won Quarterfinal series, 2–0 (Canisius); Lost Semifinal, 4–5 (American International)	
2022–23	Atlantic Hockey	26	9	14	3	1	5	1	35	8th	36	10	23	3	.319	Lost Quarterfinal series, 0–2 (RIT)	
2023–24	Atlantic Hockey	26	7	15	4	0	1	4	30	9th	35	9	22	4	.314	Lost First Round, 2–5 (Canisius)	
2024–25	AHA	26	4	19	3	1	0	2	16	11th	35	4	27	4	.171	Lost First Round, 0–2 (Canisius)	
2025–26	AHA	26	5	18	3	0	0	1	19	10th	37	6	28	3	.203	Won First Round, 5–2 (Canisius); Lost Quarterfinal series, 0–2 (Bentley)	
Totals											GP	W	L	T	%	Championships	
Regular season											1229	581	534	114	.519	3 MAAC Championships, 2 Atlantic Hockey Championships	
Conference Post-season											94	51	43	0	.543	1 ECAC West tournament championship, 2 MAAC tournament championships, 1 Atlantic Hockey tournament championship	
NCAA Post-season											9	1	8	0	.111	3 NCAA D–I Tournament appearances, 2 NCAA D–II Tournament appearances, 1 NCAA D–III Tournament appearance	
Regular season and Post-season Record											1332	633	585	114	.518		

* Winning percentage is used when conference schedules are unbalanced.
