= Steve Stirling =

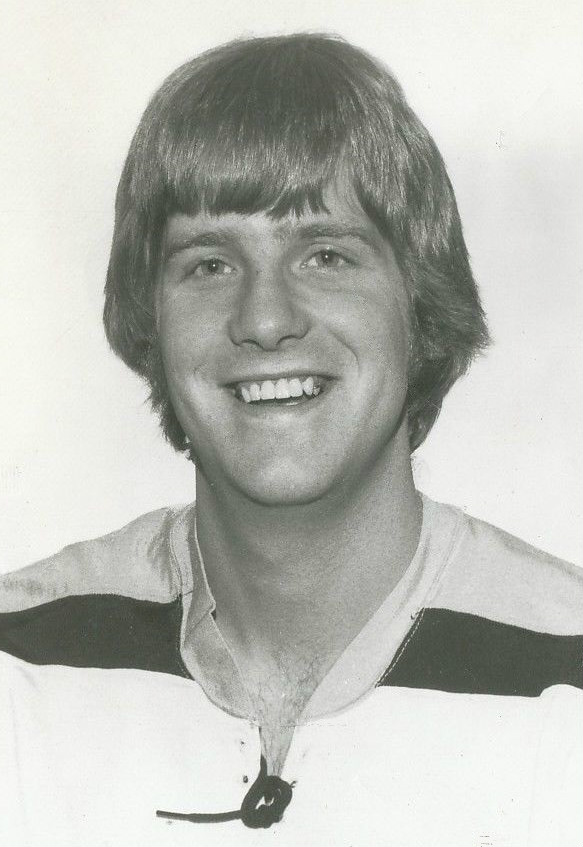
- Stirling with the Boston Braves in 1973
- Born: November 19, 1949 (age 76) Toronto, Ontario, Canada
- Coached for: Norfolk Admirals; Springfield Falcons; New York Islanders; Iserlohn Roosters; Bridgeport Sound Tigers; Babson College; Providence College; Lowell Lock Monsters
- Playing career: 1971–1977
- Coaching career: 1978–2017

James Steven Stirling (born November 19, 1949) is a scout with the Ottawa Senators of the National Hockey League (NHL). He is the former head coach of the American Hockey League (AHL)'s Norfolk Admirals, Bridgeport Sound Tigers, the Springfield Falcons and the NHL's New York Islanders.

== Career ==
Before coaching the Norfolk Admirals to their worst finish in franchise history, Stirling spent a season and a half as coach of the New York Islanders before his dismissal in January 2006, though he led the Islanders to an impressive record of 38–29–11–4 in his first season as an NHL head coach. In the NHL playoffs, the Islanders were beaten by the eventual Stanley Cup-winning Tampa Bay Lightning in five games.

Stirling has also played centre for various teams in the NCAA, AHL and NAHL. He was the firsthead coach of the Bridgeport Sound Tigers, where he led Bridgeport to a Regular Season title in his first season. He also coached the Springfield Falcons, Babson College and Providence College and as assistant coach of the Islanders and the Lowell Lock Monsters. While in college, Stirling never had a losing season. He is also one of the few people to coach at three different levels of NCAA hockey. He was also Babson's baseball coach from 1980 to 1982 and compiled a 21–32 record.

After the disappointing season with the Admirals, general manager Jay Feaster announced that Stirling would not be the coach heading into the 2008–09 AHL season. Stirling was given a job as a scout for the team. On June 16, 2008, the German DEL club Iserlohn Roosters announced that Stirling had signed a two-year contract as its head coach. After 44 games and an 0–6 series, he was dismissed by the Roosters on February 5, 2009.

Stirling was signed as an assistant coach of the Binghamton Senators (the Ottawa Senators' farm team) in 2009. The Binghamton Senators won the AHL's Calder Cup one season later.

== Personal life ==
Stirling is the father of former minor-league goaltender Scott Stirling and former professional head coach Todd Stirling, who coached the Danbury Trashers.

== Head-coaching record ==
=== College ===
Statistics overview
Season	Team	Overall	Conference	Standing	Postseason
Babson Beavers (ECAC 2) (1978–1983)
1978–79	Babson	15–8–0	11–8–0	T–13th	
1979–80	Babson	17–8–3	15–7–2	8th	ECAC 2 East Quarterfinals
1980–81	Babson	14–10–0	11–9–0	14th	ECAC 2 East Quarterfinals
1981–82	Babson	20–7–2	16–4–1	4th	NCAA Quarterfinals
1982–83	Babson	22–8–1	15–4–1	4th	NCAA 4th Place
Babson:		88–41–6	68–32–4		
Providence Friars (ECAC Hockey) (1983–1984)
1983–84	Providence	21–12–2	12–7–2	t-5th	ECAC Quarterfinals
Providence:		21–12–2	12–7–2		
Providence Friars (Hockey East) (1984–1985)
1984–85	Providence	23–17–5	15–14–5	3rd	NCAA Runner-Up
Providence:		23–17–5	15–14–5		
Babson Beavers (ECAC East) (1985–1993)
1985–86	Babson	20–8–1	14–6–1	3rd	NCAA Quarterfinals
1986–87	Babson	20–8–1	15–6–0	3rd	NCAA Quarterfinals
1987–88	Babson	23–9–0	19–5–0	2nd	NCAA Semifinals
1988–89	Babson	19–10–1	17–7–0	4th	NCAA Semifinals
1989–90	Babson	19–4–8	15–1–4	1st	NCAA Semifinals
1990–91	Babson	20–8–0	14–6–0	3rd	NCAA 3rd Place
1991–92	Babson	20–5–3	16–3–3	4th	NCAA Quarterfinals
1992–93	Babson	17–8–1	17–4–1	2nd	NCAA Quarterfinals
Babson:		158–60–15			
Total:		290–120–28			
National champion Postseason invitational champion Conference regular season champion Conference regular season and conference tournament champion Division regular season champion Division regular season and conference tournament champion Conference tournament champion

=== NHL ===
Team	Year	Regular season							Postseason
Team	Year	G	W	L	T	OTL	Pts	Finish	Result
NYI	2003–04	82	38	29	11	4	91	3rd in Atlantic	Lost in First round (TB)
NYI	2005–06	42	18	22	–	2	(78)	4th in Atlantic	(fired)
Total		124	56	51	11	6			

== Awards and honors ==
Award	Year
All-ECAC Hockey First Team	1970–71
AHCA East All-American	1970–71
ECAC Hockey All-Tournament Second Team	1971
All-NCAA All-Tournament Team	1971

Awards and achievements
Preceded by Don Brose; Herb Hammond	Edward Jeremiah Award; 1979–80; 1981–82	Succeeded by Herb Hammond; Mike Gibbons/Peter Van Buskirk
Sporting positions
Preceded by Peter Laviolette	Head coach of the New York Islanders; 2003–06	Succeeded by Brad Shaw
