= Bill Riley Jr. =

American ice hockey player and coach

Bill Riley
Biographical details
- Born: Medford, MA, USA
- Education: Boston University

Playing career
- 1965–1968: Boston University
- Position: Forward

Coaching career (HC unless noted)
- 1969–1991: Massachusetts–Lowell

Head coaching record
- Overall: 363–270–22 (.571)
- Tournaments: 11–5 (.688)

Accomplishments and honors

Championships
- 1979 ECAC East Champion; 1979 ECAC East Tournament Champion; 1979 NCAA National Champion (D-II); 1981 ECAC East Champion; 1981 ECAC East Tournament Champion; 1981 NCAA National Champion (D-II); 1982 ECAC East Champion; 1982 ECAC East Tournament Champion; 1982 NCAA National Champion (D-II); 1983 ECAC East Champion; 1983 ECAC East Tournament Champion

Awards
- 1977 Edward Jeremiah Award; 1987 Hockey East Coach of the Year; 2006 Massachusetts Hockey hall of Fame; 2013 Massachusetts–Lowell Athletic Hall of Fame; 2017 Hobey Baker Legend of College Hockey

Bill Riley Jr. is an American retired ice hockey player and coach best known for his time leading Massachusetts–Lowell to three Division II Championships.

== Playing career ==
Riley played three seasons for Boston University in the mid-to-late 1960s. In his first two years with the Terriers the team finished in the top 2 in the ECAC both times and reaching the NCAA Tournament both times. BU finished as the National Runner-Up in 1967 but for his senior season Riley managed to play in only 9 of 32 games and finished his playing career after the season. Riley's time with the Terriers coincided with another future hall of fame coach, Jack Parker.

== Coaching career ==
Riley graduated with a degree in physical education and immediately put his degree to work as the head coach for Lehigh University. After only one season with the Mountain Hawks Riley left to take over at Lowell Tech who began playing College Division hockey two years earlier. Riley was warned bout outgoing coach Dick Morrison that Tech would 'Never be a winner.' but the 24-year-old Riley took the job anyway.

In his first season Riley got the Terriers to their first winning season, going 11–6, and continued to slowly build the program. The team was rechristened as the Lowell Tech Chiefs in 1971 and promptly made the ECAC Lower Division tournament the same season. Two years later the NCAA changed their classification system into numerical tiers and Lowell Tech joined the Division II ranks. In 1975, after setting a new program high of 14 wins, Lowell again changed their name, this time to the Lowell University Chiefs after merging with Lowell State. Two years later Riley brought in his first major recruit, landing Craig MacTavish who led the team with 88 points in his sophomore season en route to a 27-6 record the program's first ECAC championship and National title. MacTavish would leave after the year and go on to a long NHL tenure but the Chiefs didn't slip in the standings too much, finishing with 23 wins and a 3rd place finish in the NCAA tournament. The next season Lowell was back atop the heap, winning a second conference and national title. In 1981 to 1982 Riley's team set the program record with 31 wins, dominated the ECAC tournament and took their third D-II National Championship with a 6-1 win over Plattsburgh State. Lowell went 29-2 the following season but lost in the National Semifinal, ruining their chance at a third consecutive National Championship.

With little left to prove at the Division II level, Lowell jumped up to Division I in 1983–84 and were accepted into ECAC Hockey as a provisional member. Playing much stiffer competition, Lowell produced its first losing season in 10 years but still finished with a respectable 15–16–3 mark. The following year Lowell joined 6 other New England–based schools in forming the new Hockey East conference but it took two more years before Lowell produced another winning record. When the NCAA tournament expanded to 12 teams in 1988 Lowell received its first berth into the postseason as a 6 seed, losing both games convincingly to Wisconsin. Over the next three seasons Lowell wallowed near the bottom of their conference and Riley resigned after the 1991 season in the midst of an investigation that determined he had violated NCAA regulations between 1987 and 1989 by offering lower than normal rent to players in buildings he co-owned. Lowell was put on probation for 2 years following the investigation and, though the team would eventually recover, Riley's coaching career was at an end.

== Awards ==
Riley was inducted into the Massachusetts Hockey Hall of Fame along with his late father Bill Sr. in 2006, the Massachusetts–Lowell Athletic Hall of Fame in 2013 and received the Hobey Baker Legends of College Hockey Award in 2017.

== Personal life ==
Riley earned a Masters in physical education in 1972 from his alma mater and a Ph.D in sports psychology in 1981. He is the nephew of Joe and John P. Riley Jr. and cousin of Army coaches Rob and Brian Riley. Rob's son, Brett, is the current head coach at Ferris State.

== College Head coaching record ==
Record table
Season	Team	Overall	Conference	Standing	Postseason
Lowell Tech Terriers (ECAC 2) (1969–1971)
1969–70	Lowell Tech	11–6–0	8–6–0	12th	
1970–71	Lowell Tech	9–8–1	7–8–1	16th	
Lowell Tech:		20–14–1	15–14–1		
Lowell Tech Chiefs (ECAC 2) (1971–1975)
1971–72	Lowell Tech	12–11–0	8–10–0	14th	
1972–73	Lowell Tech	12–10–1	11–9–1	12th	
1973–74	Lowell Tech	9–12–1	7–12–1	15th	
1974–75	Lowell Tech	14–8–0	13–7–0	7th	ECAC 2 Quarterfinals
Lowell Tech:		47–41–2	39–38–2		
Lowell Chiefs (ECAC 2) (1975–1983)
1975–76	Lowell	11–10–1	11–10–1	12th	
1976–77	Lowell	17–9–1	16–8–1	10th	ECAC 2 Semifinals
1977–78	Lowell	17–6–1	16–5–1	6th	ECAC 2 East Semifinals
1978–79	Lowell	27–6–0	21–5–0	1st	NCAA National Champion
1979–80	Lowell	23–7–0	19–4–0	3rd	NCAA Consolation Game (Win)
1980–81	Lowell	27–5–0	18–3–0	1st	NCAA National Champion
1981–82	Lowell	31–4–0	19–1–0	1st	NCAA National Champion
1982–83	Lowell	29–2–0	18–0–0	1st	NCAA Consolation Game (Win)
Lowell:		182–49–3	138–36–3		
Lowell Chiefs (ECAC Hockey) (1983–1984)
1983–84	Lowell	15–16–3	†	†	†
Lowell:		15–16–3			
Lowell Chiefs (Hockey East) (1984–1991)
1984–85	Lowell	15–25–2	11–21–2	5th	Hockey East Consolation Game (Loss)
1985–86	Lowell	11–29–2	5–27–2	T–6th	Hockey East Consolation Game (Win)
1986–87	Lowell	22–12–2	20–10–2	2nd	Hockey East Semifinals
1987–88	Lowell	20–17–2	12–14–0	4th	NCAA First Round
1988–89	Lowell	8–24–2	4–21–1	7th	
1989–90	Lowell	13–20–2	5–14–2	7th	Hockey East Quarterfinals
1990–91	Lowell	10–23–1	5–15–1	7th	Hockey East Quarterfinals
Lowell:		99–150–13	62–122–10		
Total:		363–270–22			
National champion Postseason invitational champion Conference regular season champion Conference regular season and conference tournament champion Division regular season champion Division regular season and conference tournament champion Conference tournament champion

† Lowell was a provisional member of ECAC Hockey and only played a non-conference schedule.

Awards and achievements
Preceded by Don Roberts	Edward Jeremiah Award; 1976–77	Succeeded by Sid Watson
Preceded by Jack Parker	Bob Kullen Coach of the Year Award; 1986–87	Succeeded by Shawn Walsh
Preceded by Bill Selman	Hobey Baker Legends of College Hockey Award; 2017	Succeeded by Red Berenson
