= NCAA Division II men's ice hockey tournament =

American collegiate ice hockey tournament

NCAA Division II Men's Ice Hockey Tournament
- Founded: 1978
- Folded: 1999
- Country: United States
- Most championships: Bemidji State (5)
- Website: NCAA.com

The NCAA Division II Men's Ice Hockey Tournament was an annual tournament to determine the top men's ice hockey team in NCAA Division II from 1978 until 1984 and then again from 1993 until 1999. The Division II Championship was suspended following 1999, due to a lack of sponsoring schools. Most of the schools in Division II hockey became members of newly formed hockey conferences, such as College Hockey America. The Northeast-10 Conference is the last remaining Division II conference that sponsors ice hockey.

== Champions ==
Year	Champion	Score	Runner-up	Notes
1978	Merrimack	12-2	Lake Forest	
1979	Lowell	6-4	Mankato State	
1980	Mankato State	5-2	Elmira	
1981	Lowell	5-4	Plattsburgh State	
1982	Lowell	6-1	Plattsburgh State	
1983	RIT	4-2	Bemidji State	
1984	Bemidji State	6-3, 8-1	Merrimack	Two-game, total-goal series
1985-1992	Not held			
1993	Bemidji State	10-6, 5-0	Mercyhurst	Best-of-three series
1994	Bemidji State	3-5, 2-1, 2-1 (OT)	Alabama-Huntsville	
1995	Bemidji State	6-2, 5-4	Mercyhurst	
1996	Alabama-Huntsville	7-1, 3-0	Bemidji State	
1997	Bemidji State	3-2, 4-2	Alabama-Huntsville	
1998	Alabama-Huntsville	6-2, 5-2	Bemidji State	
1999	St. Michael's	4-4, 8-5	New Hampshire College	

== Appearances by school ==
The following is a list of National Collegiate Athletic Association (NCAA) Division II college ice hockey teams that have qualified for the NCAA Division II Men's Ice Hockey Championship as of 1999 with teams listed by number of appearances.

NCAA Men's Division II Ice Hockey Tournament
School	Tournament Appearances	Tournament Years	Best Result
Bemidji State	8	1983, 1984, 1993, 1994, 1995, 1996, 1997, 1998	Champion (1984, 1993, 1994, 1995, 1997)
Mankato State	6	1978, 1979, 1980, 1981, 1982, 1983	Champion (1980)
Lowell	5	1979, 1980, 1981, 1982, 1983	Champion (1979, 1981, 1982)
Alabama-Huntsville	4	1994, 1996, 1997, 1998	Champion (1996, 1998)
Merrimack	4	1978, 1980, 1982, 1984	Champion (1978)
Mercyhurst	2	1993, 1995	Runner-Up (1993, 1995)
Plattsburgh State	2	1981, 1982	Runner-Up (1981, 1982)
Elmira	2	1978, 1980	Runner-Up (1980)
New Hampshire College	2	1984, 1999	Runner-Up (1999)
Babson	2	1982, 1983	Frozen Four (1983)
Gustavus Adolphus	2	1982, 1983	Frozen Four (1982)
Oswego State	2	1982, 1983	Quarterfinals (1982, 1983)
RIT	1	1983	Champion (1983)
Saint Michael's	1	1999	Champion (1999)
Lake Forest	1	1978	Runner-Up (1978)
Alaska	1	1984	Frozen Four (1984)
Concordia	1	1981	Frozen Four (1981)
Illinois-Chicago	1	1979	Frozen Four (1979)
Salem State	1	1979	Frozen Four (1979)
Norwich	1	1983	Quarterfinals (1983)
St. Scholastica	1	1982	Quarterfinals (1982)

== All-time record ==
This is a list of NCAA Men's Division II Ice Hockey Tournament all-time records, updated through the 1999 Tournament.

School	Games	Wins	Losses	Ties	Winning pct.	Championships
Alabama–Huntsville	9	5	4	0	.556	2
Alaska	2	0	2	0	.000	0
Babson	6	1	4	1	.250	0
Bemidji State	21	14	7	0	.667	5
Concordia	2	0	2	0	.000	0
Elmira	4	1	3	0	.250	0
Gustavus Adolphus	6	4	2	0	.667	0
Illinois-Chicago	2	1	1	0	.500	0
Lake Forest	2	1	1	0	.500	0
Lowell	14	11	3	0	.786	3
Mankato State	12	6	6	0	.500	1
Mercyhurst	4	0	4	0	.000	0
Merrimack	12	6	6	0	.500	1
New Hampshire College	4	0	3	1	.125	0
Norwich	2	1	1	0	.500	0
Oswego State	4	1	3	0	.250	0
Plattsburgh State	6	3	2	1	.583	0
RIT	4	3	1	0	.750	1
Saint Michael's	2	1	0	1	.750	1
Salem State	2	0	2	0	.000	0
St. Scholastica	2	0	2	0	.000	0

== Awards ==
=== Most Outstanding Player ===
The Tournament Most Outstanding Player was an annual award given out at the conclusion of the NCAA Men's Ice Hockey Championship to the player to be judged the most outstanding. The award was in effect for the first 7 tournaments and when the tournament was restarted in 1993 no individual awards were conferred.

Year	Winner	Position	School
1978	Jim Toomey	Forward	Merrimack
1979	Craig MacTavish	Forward	Lowell
1980	Steve Carroll	Goaltender	Mankato State
1981	Tom Mulligan	Defenseman	Lowell
1982	Paul Lohnes	Defenseman	Lowell
1983	Dave Burkholder	Goaltender	RIT
1984	Joel Otto	Forward	Bemidji State

== See also ==
- NCAA Division I Men's Ice Hockey Championship
- NCAA Division III Men's Ice Hockey Championship
- National Collegiate Women's Ice Hockey Championship
