= Mark Kumpel =

American ice hockey player (born 1961)

- Born: March 7, 1961 (age 65) Wakefield, Massachusetts, U.S.
- Height: 6 ft 0 in (183 cm)
- Weight: 190 lb (86 kg; 13 st 8 lb)
- Position: Right wing
- Shot: Right
- Played for: Quebec Nordiques; Detroit Red Wings; Winnipeg Jets
- National team: United States
- NHL draft: 108th overall, 1980; Quebec Nordiques
- Playing career: 1983–1993

Mark Alan Kumpel (born March 7, 1961) is an American former ice hockey player.

Selected by the Quebec Nordiques in the 1980 NHL entry draft, Kumpel also played for the Detroit Red Wings and Winnipeg Jets. A member of the 1984 Olympic team, Kumpel retired from the NHL after 288 games played where he totaled 38 goals for 84 points.

After his retirement as a player, Kumpel served as head coach of the Nashville Knights and Dayton Bombers of the ECHL, and was on the Portland Pirates staff from 1998 to 2004. Kumpel also served as a scout for the NHL's Atlanta Thrashers.

Prior to becoming the director of hockey operations for the Eastern Hockey League (EHL) in 2012, Kumpel had a successful five-year tenure as head coach of the Walpole Express Junior A hockey team. Kumpel led the Express to three consecutive Atlantic Junior Hockey League playoff championships (2009–12) and two regular-season titles in (2011 and 2012). In 2019, he left the EHL to take a position with Kunlun Red Star's development team in China.

== Career statistics ==
=== Regular season and playoffs ===
			Regular season					Playoffs
Season	Team	League	GP	G	A	Pts	PIM	GP	G	A	Pts	PIM
1979–80	Lowell	ECAC II	30	18	18	36	12	—	—	—	—	—
1980–81	Lowell	ECAC II	1	2	0	2	0	—	—	—	—	—
1981–82	Lowell	ECAC II	35	17	13	30	23	—	—	—	—	—
1982–83	Lowell	ECAC II	7	8	5	13	0	—	—	—	—	—
1982–83	United States National Team	Intl	30	14	18	32	6	—	—	—	—	—
1983–84	United States National Team	Intl	61	14	19	33	19	—	—	—	—	—
1983–84	Fredericton Express	AHL	16	1	1	2	5	3	0	0	0	15
1984–85	Quebec Nordiques	NHL	42	8	7	15	26	18	3	4	7	4
1984–85	Fredericton Express	AHL	18	9	6	15	17	—	—	—	—	—
1985–86	Quebec Nordiques	NHL	47	10	12	22	17	2	1	0	1	0
1985–86	Fredericton Express	AHL	7	4	2	6	4	—	—	—	—	—
1986–87	Quebec Nordiques	NHL	40	1	8	9	16	—	—	—	—	—
1986–87	Detroit Red Wings	NHL	5	0	1	1	0	8	0	0	0	4
1986–87	Adirondack Red Wings	AHL	7	2	3	5	0	1	1	0	1	0
1987–88	Detroit Red Wings	NHL	13	0	2	2	4	—	—	—	—	—
1987–88	Winnipeg Jets	NHL	32	4	4	8	19	4	0	0	0	4
1987–88	Adirondack Red Wings	AHL	4	5	0	5	2	—	—	—	—	—
1988–89	Moncton Hawks	AHL	53	22	23	45	25	—	—	—	—	—
1989–90	Winnipeg Jets	NHL	56	8	9	17	21	7	2	0	2	2
1990–91	Winnipeg Jets	NHL	53	7	3	10	10	—	—	—	—	—
1991–92	Moncton Hawks	AHL	41	11	18	29	12	2	0	0	0	0
1992–93	Providence Bruins	AHL	30	5	3	8	14	—	—	—	—	—
AHL totals			176	59	56	115	79	6	1	0	1	15
NHL totals			288	38	46	84	113	39	6	4	10	14

=== International ===
Year	Team	Event	GP	G	A	Pts	PIM
1981	United States	WJC	—	—	—	—	—
1983	United States	WC B	—	—	—	—	—
1984	United States	OG	6	1	0	1	2
Senior totals			6	1	0	1	2
