= 1996–97 NCAA Division II men's ice hockey season =

- Duration: October 1996– March 15, 1997
- NCAA tournament: 1997
- National championship: John S. Glas Field House; Bemidji, Minnesota
- NCAA champion: Bemidji State

The 1996–97 NCAA Division II men's ice hockey season began in October 1996 and concluded on March 15, 1997. This was the 25th season of second-tier college ice hockey.

== Regular season ==
=== Standings ===
1996–97 NCAA Division II Independent ice hockey standings
| | Overall record | | | | | |
| | GP | W | L | T | GF | GA |
|---|---|---|---|---|---|---|
| Alabama–Huntsville | 28 | 20 | 8 | 0 | 165 | 88 |
| Findlay | 29 | 15 | 11 | 3 | | |
| Minnesota–Crookston | 30 | 14 | 13 | 3 | | |

Note: the records of teams who were members of Division III conferences during the season can be found here.

== 1997 NCAA Tournament ==
| National Championship; March 14–15 |
| W | Bemidji State | 3 | 4 | - |
| E | Alabama–Huntsville | 2 | 2 | - |

Note: * denotes overtime period(s)
Note: Mini-games in italics

== See also ==
- 1996–97 NCAA Division I men's ice hockey season
- 1996–97 NCAA Division III men's ice hockey season
