= 1996–97 Alabama–Huntsville Chargers men's ice hockey season =

American college ice hockey team season

1996–97 Alabama–Huntsville Chargers men's ice hockey

Western Mass. Men's Ice Hockey Classic Champions

NCAA Championship Series, L 2–3, 2–4 vs. Bemidji State
- Conference: Independent
- Record: 20–8–0
- Head coach: Doug Ross (15th season)
- Assistant coaches: Mike Quenneville; Lance West
- Home stadium: Von Braun Civic Center

The 1996–97 Alabama–Huntsville Chargers ice hockey team represented the University of Alabama in Huntsville in the 1996–97 NCAA Division II men's hockey season. The team was coached by Doug Ross, who was in his 15th season as head coach, and they played their home games at the Von Braun Civic Center.

The Chargers entered the season as the defending Division II National Champions, having defeated Bemidji State in the national championship series. UAH finished the regular season with 20 wins and 6 losses, including wins over Division I teams Air Force and Mankato State. At the end of the season, UAH played in the Division II National Championship in a rematch with Bemidji State. The Chargers lost the two games in Bemidji, Minnesota, by scores of 2–3 and 2–4.

== Roster ==
No.	Nat.	Player	Class	Pos	Height	Weight	DoB	Hometown	Previous team
1		Cédrick Billequey	Sophomore	G	6' 0" (1.83 m)	180 lb (82 kg)	1975-03-10	Montreal, Quebec
2		Shane Stewart	Freshman	D	6' 1" (1.85 m)	190 lb (86 kg)	1975-06-17	New Liskeard, Ontario	Stratford (MWJHL)
5		Jim Alauria	Sophomore	D	6' 2" (1.88 m)	220 lb (100 kg)	1975-05-04	Phoenix, Arizona	Illinois–Chicago (NCAA)
7		Marc Lalonde	Freshman	D	6' 1" (1.85 m)	168 lb (76 kg)		Cambridge, Ontario
9		Joe Provenzano	Sophomore	D	6' 1" (1.85 m)	185 lb (84 kg)	1975-03-29	Grosse Pointe, Michigan	Des Moines (USHL)
10		Darren Awender	Junior	C	5' 8" (1.73 m)	185 lb (84 kg)		St. Clair Beach, Ontario	Leamington (WOHL)
11		Nathan Bowen	Freshman	LW	6' 0" (1.83 m)	190 lb (86 kg)	1975-09-03	London, Ontario	Petrolia (WOHL)
12		Tom Williams	Freshman	RW	5' 9" (1.75 m)	175 lb (79 kg)		Windsor, Ontario	Leamington (WOHL)
14		Matt Parker	Junior	LW	5' 10" (1.78 m)	175 lb (79 kg)	1975-07-28	Huntsville, Alabama
15		Paul Schloss	Sophomore	RW	5' 10" (1.78 m)	180 lb (82 kg)		Livonia, Michigan
16		Tony Guzzo	Senior	C	5' 10" (1.78 m)	175 lb (79 kg)		Canton, Michigan
17		Jay Woodcroft	Freshman	C	6' 1" (1.85 m)	180 lb (82 kg)	1976-08-11	Toronto, Ontario	Markham (MetJHL)
18		Mark Motowski	Sophomore	D	6' 3" (1.91 m)	210 lb (95 kg)	1974-10-13	Dearborn, Michigan	Illinois–Chicago (NCAA)
19		Mike Hamiln	Sophomore	RW	6' 0" (1.83 m)	180 lb (82 kg)		Flint, Michigan
20		Eric Bilyeu	Senior	LW	5' 9" (1.75 m)	170 lb (77 kg)	1973-03-22	St. Joseph, Michigan
21		K. C. Schneider	Senior	RW	5' 11" (1.8 m)	190 lb (86 kg)		Indianapolis, Indiana
22		Jamie Baby	Sophomore	C	6' 1" (1.85 m)	180 lb (82 kg)		Parry Sound, Ontario	Muskoka (MetJHL)
23		Jason Mucciarone	Junior	D	6' 1" (1.85 m)	205 lb (93 kg)	1974-10-11	Milford, Massachusetts
25		John McCabe	Junior	LW	6' 4" (1.93 m)	210 lb (95 kg)	1974-05-30	Espanola, Ontario
27		Ryan Stewart	Sophomore	RW	5' 10" (1.78 m)	170 lb (77 kg)		Bowmanville, Ontario	Danville (NAHL)
29		Ryan Gillespie	Sophomore					Franklin, Tennessee
35		Mike Zeller	Junior	G	6' 0" (1.83 m)	175 lb (79 kg)		Goodrich, Michigan
		Rob Blakley	Freshman	D				North York, Ontario	North York (MetJHL)
		Ty Hartigan	Sophomore	RW	6' 2" (1.88 m)	181 lb (82 kg)	1974-09-18	St. Louis, Missouri	Illinois–Chicago (NCAA)
		Andy Weeks	Freshman	G	5' 11" (1.8 m)	165 lb (75 kg)	1976-04-30	Glenview, Illinois	Springfield (NAHL)
		Derek Young	Freshman	D	6' 0" (1.83 m)	204 lb (93 kg)	1976-04-09	Whitby, Ontario	Markham (MetJHL)

== Schedule and results ==
- Green background indicates win.
- Red background indicates loss.
- Yellow background indicates tie.

Date	Opponent	Site	Decision	Result	Attendance	Record
Exhibition
October 25	Penn State*	Von Braun Civic Center • Huntsville, Alabama (Exhibition)	Zeller	W 15–0	n/a	—
October 26	Penn State*	Von Braun Civic Center • Huntsville, Alabama (Exhibition)	Billequey	W 3–1	n/a	—
Regular Season
November 1	at Maine*	Alfond Arena • Orono, Maine		L 2–7	4,925	0–1–0
November 2	at Maine*	Alfond Arena • Orono, Maine		L 1–5	5,017	0–2–0
November 15	St. Mary's (MN)*	Von Braun Civic Center • Huntsville, Alabama		W 7–3	2,286	1–2–0
November 16	St. Mary's (MN)*	Von Braun Civic Center • Huntsville, Alabama		W 7–1	1,899	2–2–0
November 22	Potsdam*	Von Braun Civic Center • Huntsville, Alabama		W 11–6	2,306	3–2–0
November 23	Potsdam*	Von Braun Civic Center • Huntsville, Alabama		W 6–4	1,252	4–2–0
November 29	Connecticut*	Von Braun Civic Center • Huntsville, Alabama		W 6–3	2,296	5–2–0
November 30	Connecticut*	Von Braun Civic Center • Huntsville, Alabama		W 5–4	2,016	6–2–0
December 13	Salem State*	Von Braun Civic Center • Huntsville, Alabama		L 2–4	2,066	6–3–0
December 14	Salem State*	Von Braun Civic Center • Huntsville, Alabama		W 8–4	1,300	7–3–0
December 29	New England College*	Von Braun Civic Center • Huntsville, Alabama		W 3–2	1,558	8–3–0
December 30	New England College*	Von Braun Civic Center • Huntsville, Alabama		W 13–2	1,764	9–3–0
January 4	vs. American International*	Lansing Chapman Rink • Williamstown, Massachusetts (Western Mass. Men's Ice Hockey Classic)		W 6–1	100	10–3–0
January 5	at Williams*	Lansing Chapman Rink • Williamstown, Massachusetts (Western Mass. Men's Ice Hockey Classic)		W 9–4	100	11–3–0
January 10	Bentley*	Von Braun Civic Center • Huntsville, Alabama	Billequey	W 9–0	574	12–3–0
January 11	Bentley*	Von Braun Civic Center • Huntsville, Alabama		W 7–3	1,007	13–3–0
January 24	at Air Force*	Cadet Ice Arena • Colorado Springs, Colorado		W 5–4	1,579	14–3–0
January 25	at Air Force*	Cadet Ice Arena • Colorado Springs, Colorado		W 4–2	2,256	15–3–0
January 31	Villanova*	Von Braun Civic Center • Huntsville, Alabama	Billequey	W 9–0	4,892	16–3–0
February 1	Villanova*	Von Braun Civic Center • Huntsville, Alabama		W 14–1	1,288	17–3–0
February 7	Minnesota–Crookston*	Von Braun Civic Center • Huntsville, Alabama		W 5–1	3,280	18–3–0
February 8	Minnesota–Crookston*	Von Braun Civic Center • Huntsville, Alabama		W 11–1	3,013	19–3–0
February 14	Mankato State*	Von Braun Civic Center • Huntsville, Alabama		L 1–3	2,765	19–4–0
February 15	Mankato State*	Von Braun Civic Center • Huntsville, Alabama		W 6–3	2,043	20–4–0
February 28	at Mankato State*	Mankato Civic Center • Mankato, Minnesota		L 2–5	2,542	20–5–0
March 1	at Mankato State*	Mankato Civic Center • Mankato, Minnesota		L 2–8	2,806	20–6–0
NCAA Division II Championship Series
March 14	at Bemidji State*	John S. Glas Field House • Bemidji, Minnesota		L 2–3	2,950	20–7–0
March 15	at Bemidji State*	John S. Glas Field House • Bemidji, Minnesota		L 2–4	3,150	20–8–0
*Non-conference game. Sources:

== Player stats ==
=== Skaters ===
Player	Pos	Yr	GP	G	A	Pts	PIM	PPG	SHG	GWG
K. C. Schneider	RW	Sr	28	19	30	49	30	11	0	1
Tony Guzzo	C	Sr	28	16	32	48	2	4	3	3
Matt Parker	LW	Jr	28	18	26	44	79	7	2	2
Mike Hamiln	RW	So	28	15	17	32	22	3	0	2
Jim Alauria	D	So	28	9	21	30	85	7	0	0
Shane Stewart	D	Fr	28	9	18	27	70	5	0	3
John McCabe	LW	Jr	28	11	15	26	22	1	3	3
Jay Woodcroft	C	Fr	27	9	14	23	22	0	1	0
Eric Bilyeu	LW	Sr	28	10	11	21	34	5	1	1
Nathan Bowen	LW	Fr	25	9	12	21	28	1	0	0
Tom Williams	RW	Fr	24	9	10	19	46	1	2	0
Jamie Baby	C	So	20	8	10	18	17	3	1	2
Paul Schloss	RW	So	25	8	9	17	10	1	1	1
Mark Motowski	D	So	28	6	6	12	16	2	0	1
Marc Lalonde	D	Fr	27	3	8	11	27	0	0	0
Joe Provenzano	D	So	27	3	6	9	37	0	0	0
Darren Awender	C	Jr	28	1	7	8	35	0	0	1
Derek Young	D	Fr	10	2	4	6	6	0	0	0
Jason Mucciarone	D	Jr	19	0	3	3	16	0	0	0
Ryan Stewart	RW	So	11	0	0	0	4	0	0	0
Team			28	165	263	428	670	51	14	20

=== Goaltenders ===
Player	Yr	GP	TOI	W	L	T	GA	GAA	SV%	SO
Cédrick Billequey	So	22	1166:23	13	7	0	55	2.83	.892	2
Mike Zeller	Jr	10	418:48	5	1	0	26	3.72	.841	0
Andrew Weeks	Fr	3	92:07	2	0	0	5	3.26	.865	0
