= 1983–84 NCAA Division II men's ice hockey season =

- Duration: November 1983– March 18, 1984
- NCAA tournament: 1984
- National championship: John S. Glas Field House; Bemidji, Minnesota
- NCAA champion: Bemidji State

The 1983–84 NCAA Division II men's ice hockey season began in November 1983 and concluded on March 18 of the following year. This was the 20th season of second-tier college ice hockey.

The majority of programs that had been playing at the Division II level came from Division III schools but continued to play at a higher level because the NCAA did not hold a National Division III Tournament. That changed for the 1983–84 season and with the institution of the new championship all of the Division III schools dropped down to their normal level. This left scant few teams at the Division II level and when it became apparent that the NCAA could not hold a national tournament for so few programs they decided to shutter the D-II championship after the 1984 playoff.

As a swan song for the Division II level, Bemidji State produced only the second undefeated championship season in NCAA history (the first being Cornell in 1970).

== Regular season ==
=== Season tournaments ===
Tournament	Dates	Teams	Champion
Geneseo Tournament	November 4–5	4	Westfield State
Oswego Tournament	November 4–5	4	Guelph
RIT Tournament	November 4–5	4	Wilfrid Laurier
Granite State Invitational	November 12–13	4	New England College
Merrimack Thanksgiving Tournament	November 19–20	4	New England College
Williams Invitational	November 25–26	4	Connecticut
Cardinal Classic	December 2–3	4	RIT
Crusader Classic	December 10–11	4	
Codfish Bowl	December 28–30	4	Massachusetts–Boston
Salem State Tournament	January 4–5	4	
Blue-Gold Tournament	January 6–7	4	Merrimack

=== Standings ===
1983–84 ECAC 2 standings
	Conference							Overall					
	GP	W	L	T	Pct.	GF	GA	GP	W	L	T	GF	GA
East Region
Babson *	19	16	3	1	.825			33	27	5	1	184	77
Bowdoin †	16	12	3	1	.781			26	19	6	1		
New England College	24	16	6	2	.708			27	16	8	3		
Norwich	21	14	7	0	.667	124	76	26	17	9	0	153	96
Merrimack	20	10	10	0	.500	93	86	32	13	19	0	125	154
Williams	17	8	8	1	.500			22	10	11	1		
Salem State	24	10	11	3	.479			31	13	15	3		
Colby	16	7	8	1	.469			21	7	13	1		
Holy Cross	20	8	10	2	.450			28	10	15	3	115	132
Massachusetts–Boston	16	7	9	0	.438	65	82	27	16	11	0	151	123
Connecticut	20	7	13	0	.350	72	103	28	13	15	0	129	129
Middlebury	17	5	11	1	.324	47	68	23	10	12	1	85	85
Saint Anselm	19	6	13	0	.316			27	12	15	0	130	142
Westfield State	16	4	12	0	.250			25	11	14	0		
American International	17	3	14	0	.176			26	10	16	0		
West Region
RIT †*	24	22	2	0	.917			35	29	6	0	248	74
Oswego State	21	17	4	0	.810			32	21	11	0	189	138
Union	19	13	5	1	.711			31	19	11	1		
Elmira	25	17	8	0	.680			26	17	8	1	127	77
North Adams State	25	15	8	2	.640			29	18	9	2		
Potsdam State	25	14	10	1	.580			29	15	13	1		
Plattsburgh State	25	14	11	0	.560	131	89	34	16	18	0	158	134
Hamilton	19	9	10	0	.474			24	9	15	0		
Brockport State	21	8	12	1	.405			23	9	13	1	107	118
Geneseo State	23	9	14	0	.391			30	12	18	0		
Buffalo	22	7	15	0	.318			24	7	16	1		
Cortland State	21	6	15	0	.286			25	9	16	0		
Canisius	19	2	16	1	.132			27	5	21	1	104	190
Hobart	18	2	16	0	.111			21	3	17	1		
Championships: March 5, 1984 † indicates division regular season champion * indicates conference tournament champions

1983–84 NCAA Division II Independent ice hockey standings
	Overall record					
	GP	W	L	T	GF	GA
Alaska–Anchorage	30	23	6	1	151	92
Alaska–Fairbanks	29	22	7	0	-	-
Lake Forest	25	13	11	1	128	112
Wisconsin–Stevens Point	23	2	21	0	-	-

1983–84 Minnesota Intercollegiate Athletic Conference ice hockey standings
	Conference							Overall					
	GP	W	L	T	Pts	GF	GA	GP	W	L	T	GF	GA
Gustavus Adolphus †	16	13	2	1	27	101	58	29	16	12	1	157	141
St. Thomas	16	13	3	0	26	101	61	31	19	10	2		
Augsburg	16	10	6	0	20	94	63	35	21	13	1	200	161
Hamline	16	8	7	1	17	82	82	29	12	15	2		
Bethel	16	6	10	0	12	67	72	26	11	14	1	115	127
Saint John's	16	6	10	0	12	66	81	27	10	17	0	120	152
St. Olaf	16	6	10	0	12	62	80	28	10	18	0	106	139
Saint Mary's	16	5	10	1	11	53	75	27	7	18	2	87	134
Concordia (MN)	16	3	12	1	7	69	113	26	4	21	1	106	190
† indicates conference regular season champion

1983–84 Northern Collegiate Hockey Association standings
	Conference							Overall					
	GP	W	L	T	Pts	GF	GA	GP	W	L	T	GF	GA
Bemidji State †	18	18	0	0	36	119	42	31	31	0	0	210	71
Wisconsin–River Falls	16	11	5	0	22	89	50	32	21	10	1	203	127
Mankato State	18	11	7	0	22	93	74	30	16	14	0	148	125
Wisconsin–Eau Claire	16	8	8	0	16	78	81	29	17	12	0	149	127
St. Cloud State	18	8	10	0	16	79	89	28	11	17	0	128	136
St. Scholastica	18	4	14	0	8	80	118	28	8	20	0	131	175
Wisconsin–Superior	16	0	16	0	0	32	112	30	9	21	0	94	167
† indicates conference regular season champion

1983–84 NYCHA standings
	Conference							Overall					
	GP	W	L	T	Pts	GF	GA	GP	W	L	T	GF	GA
RIT †	18	17	1	0	34	147	30	35	29	6	0	248	74
Elmira	18	15	3	0	30	101	44	26	17	8	1	127	77
Oswego State	18	15	3	0	30	124	63	32	21	11	0	189	138
Brockport State	18	7	10	1	15	83	93	23	9	13	1	107	118
Canisius	18	2	15	1	5	59	126	27	5	21	1	104	190
Hobart	18	2	16	0	4	55	138	22	3	18	1	76	171
Buffalo								24	7	16	1		
Cortland State													
Geneseo State								30	12	18	0		
Potsdam State								29	15	13	1		
As of 2/3: 1. RIT 12-1-0, 2. Oswego 10-1-0, 3. Potsdam 9-5-0, 4. Elmira 8-2-0, 5. Buffalo 6-5-0, 6. Brockport 3-6-1, 7. Geneseo 3-6-0, 8. Cortland 2-8-0, 9. Hobart 1-10-0, 10. Canisius 0-10-1 † indicates conference regular season champion

== 1984 NCAA Tournament ==
Semifinals; March 10–12
Bemidji State	9	4	13
Alaska–Fairbanks	6	2	8
Merrimack	4	5	9
New Hampshire College	3	4	7

National Championship; March 17–18
Bemidji State	6	8	14
Merrimack	3	1	4

Note: * denotes overtime period(s)

== Drafted players ==
Round	Pick	Player	College	Conference	NHL team
8	155	Jim Vesey ^{†}	Merrimack	ECAC 2	St. Louis Blues
12	230	Mark Ziliotto ^{†}	Merrimack	ECAC 2	Pittsburgh Penguins
12	231	Chris Kiene ^{†}	Merrimack	ECAC 2	New Jersey Devils

† incoming freshman

== See also ==
- 1983–84 NCAA Division I men's ice hockey season
- 1983–84 NCAA Division III men's ice hockey season
