= 1998–99 NCAA Division II men's ice hockey season =

Division II men's ice hockey season

- Duration: October 1998– March 13, 1999
- NCAA tournament: 1999
- National championship: C. Douglas Cairns Arena; Colchester, Vermont
- NCAA champion: Saint Michael's

The 1998–99 NCAA Division II men's ice hockey season began in October 1998 and concluded on March 13, 1999. This was the 27th season of second-tier college ice hockey.

After the 1998 Championship many D-II teams raised their programs to Division I including several who had used the Division II level as a stepping stone to the top ranks. With few remaining D-II programs, the tournament dropped the regional selections and took the two teams with the best records, coincidentally they were both members of ECAC Northeast. The division was dealt a further blow when another handful of programs announced they would follow suit after the '99 season. With so few Division II schools fielding varsity ice hockey teams, the NCAA decided to suspend the D-II Tournament at the conclusion of the season. Though Division II ice hockey continues, the tournament has remained mothballed (as of 2019).

== Regular season ==
=== Standings ===
1998–99 NCAA Division II Independent ice hockey standings
	Overall record					
	GP	W	L	T	GF	GA
Bentley	27	14	12	1	114	131
Minnesota–Crookston	28	19	8	1		

Note: the records of teams who were members of Division III conferences during the season can be found here.

== 1999 NCAA Tournament ==
National Championship; March 12–13
1	New Hampshire College	4*	5	-
2	Saint Michael's	4	8	-

Note: * denotes overtime period(s)
Note: Mini-games in italics

== See also ==
- 1998–99 NCAA Division I men's ice hockey season
- 1998–99 NCAA Division III men's ice hockey season
