= 1984 NCAA Division II men's ice hockey tournament =

- Teams: 4
- Finals site: John S. Glas Field House; Bemidji, Minnesota
- Champions: Bemidji State Beavers (1st title)
- Runner-up: Merrimack Warriors (2nd title game)
- Semifinalists: Alaska–Fairbanks Nanooks (1st Frozen Four); New Hampshire College Penmen (1st Frozen Four)
- Winning coach: Bob Peters (1st title)
- MOP: Joel Otto (Bemidji State)
- Attendance: 8,114

The 1984 NCAA Men's Division II Ice Hockey Tournament involved 8 schools playing in single-elimination play to determine the national champion of men's NCAA Division II college ice hockey. A total of 6 games were played, hosted by Bemidji State.

Bemidji State, coached by Bob Peters, won the national title with a 14-4 two-game aggregate victory in the finals over Merrimack.

Joel Otto, of Bemidji State, was named the Most Outstanding Player and Drey Bradley, of Bemidji State, was the high scorer of the tournament with ten points (2 goals, 8 assists).

== Qualifying teams ==
East				West			
Seed	Team	Record	Last Bid	Seed	Team	Record	Last Bid
1	New Hampshire College	18–7–1	Never	1	Bemidji State	27–0–0	1983
2	Merrimack	11–17–0	1982	2	Alaska–Fairbanks	22–5–0	Never

== Tournament Bracket ==
Each round were two-game total-goals series played at the tournament host.

Semifinals; March 10–11
Bemidji State	9	4	13
Alaska–Fairbanks	6	2	8
Merrimack	4	5	9
New Hampshire College	3	4	7

Finals; March 17–18
Bemidji State	6	8	14
Merrimack	3	1	4

== All-Tournament Team ==
- G: Galen Nagle (Bemidji State)
- D: Drey Bradley (Bemidji State)
- D: Dave Jerome (Bemidji State)
- F: Joel Otto (Bemidji State)
- F: Eric Gager (Bemidji State)
- F: Tony Del Gaizo (Merrimack)
