= 1997 NCAA Division II men's ice hockey tournament =

- Teams: 2
- Finals site: John S. Glas Field House, Bemidji, Minnesota
- Champions: Bemidji State Beavers (5th title)
- Runner-up: Alabama-Huntsville Chargers (3rd title game)
- Winning coach: Bob Peters (5th title)
- Attendance: 6,100

The 1997 NCAA Men's Division II Ice Hockey Tournament involved 2 schools playing in a best of three game series to determine the national champion of men's NCAA Division II college ice hockey. A total of 3 games were played, hosted by Bemidji State University.

Bemidji State, coached by Bob Peters, won the national title over Alabama-Huntsville, two games to one.

Marc Lafleur, was the tournament's leading scorer with four points.

== Tournament Format ==
One eastern and one western team were invited to play a modified best-of-three tournament. In the first two games the teams would be awarded points (2 points for a win, one point for a tie) and whichever team had the most points would be the champion. If the teams were tied after two games then a 20-minute mini-game would be played to determine the champion.

== Qualifying teams ==
Team	Record
Bemidji State	23–7–2
Alabama–Huntsville	20–6–0

== Tournament Games ==
National Championship; March 14–15
W	Bemidji State	3	4	-
E	Alabama–Huntsville	2	2	-

Note: * denotes overtime period(s)
Note: Mini-games in italics

== Tournament Awards ==
None Awarded
