= 1995–96 NCAA Division II men's ice hockey season =

- Duration: October 1995– March 9, 1996
- NCAA tournament: 1996
- National championship: Von Braun Center; Huntsville, Alabama
- NCAA champion: Alabama–Huntsville

The 1995–96 NCAA Division II men's ice hockey season began in October 1995 and concluded on March 9, 1996. This was the 24th season of second-tier college ice hockey.

Alabama–Huntsville became the first undefeated champion since Bemidji State in 1984.

== Regular season ==
=== Standings ===
1995–96 NCAA Division II Independent ice hockey standings
	Overall record					
	GP	W	L	T	GF	GA
Alabama–Huntsville	29	26	0	3	185	51
Mankato State	32	16	12	4	138	108

Note: the records of teams who were members of Division III conferences during the season can be found here.

== 1996 NCAA Tournament ==
National Championship; March 8–9
E	Alabama–Huntsville	7	3	-
W	Bemidji State	1	0	-

Note: * denotes overtime period(s)
Note: Mini-games in italics

== See also ==
- 1995–96 NCAA Division I men's ice hockey season
- 1995–96 NCAA Division III men's ice hockey season
