= 1992–93 NCAA Division II men's ice hockey season =

- Duration: October 1992– March 20, 1993
- NCAA tournament: 1993
- National championship: John S. Glas Field House; Bemidji, Minnesota
- NCAA champion: Bemidji State

The 1992–93 NCAA Division II men's ice hockey season began in November 1992 and concluded on March 20, 1993. This was the 21st season of second-tier college ice hockey.

The NCAA restarted the Division II championship in 1993 when several Division II schools expressed interest in rekindling the second-tier championship. At the time no conferences moved to D-II and while a few teams left their conferences to become Division II Independents, many more nominally D-II programs remained in their D-III conferences but would submit bids to the Division II Championship. Due to the low number of programs qualifying as Division II, the entire tournament was held between two teams as a best-of-three series.

== Regular season ==
=== Standings ===
1992–93 NCAA Division II Independent ice hockey standings
	Overall record					
	GP	W	L	T	GF	GA
Alabama–Huntsville	28	15	12	1	149	121
Mankato State	28	8	16	4	108	128

Note: the records of teams who were members of Division III conferences during the season can be found here.

== 1993 NCAA Tournament ==
National Championship; March 19–20
Bemidji State	10	5	-
Mercyhurst	6	0	-

Note: * denotes overtime period(s)

== See also ==
- 1992–93 NCAA Division I men's ice hockey season
- 1992–93 NCAA Division III men's ice hockey season
