= 1994–95 NCAA Division II men's ice hockey season =

- Duration: October 1994– March 18, 1995
- NCAA tournament: 1995
- National championship: Mercyhurst Ice Center; Erie, Pennsylvania
- NCAA champion: Bemidji State

The 1994–95 NCAA Division II men's ice hockey season began in October 1994 and concluded on March 18, 1995. This was the 23rd season of second-tier college ice hockey.

== Regular season ==
=== Standings ===
1994–95 NCAA Division II Independent ice hockey standings
	Overall record					
	GP	W	L	T	GF	GA
Alabama–Huntsville	27	20	5	2	174	69
Mankato State	31	19	12	0	127	99

Note: the records of teams who were members of Division III conferences during the season can be found here.

== 1995 NCAA Tournament ==
National Championship; March 17–18
W	Bemidji State	6	5	-
E	Mercyhurst	2	4	-

Note: * denotes overtime period(s)
Note: Mini-games in italics

== See also ==
- 1994–95 NCAA Division I men's ice hockey season
- 1994–95 NCAA Division III men's ice hockey season
