= 1997–98 NCAA Division II men's ice hockey season =

- Duration: October 1997– March 14, 1998
- NCAA tournament: 1998
- National championship: Von Braun Center; Huntsville, Alabama
- NCAA champion: Alabama–Huntsville

The 1997–98 NCAA Division II men's ice hockey season began in October 1997 and concluded on March 14, 1998. This was the 26th season of second-tier college ice hockey.

== Regular season ==
=== Standings ===
1997–98 NCAA Division II Independent ice hockey standings
	Overall record					
	GP	W	L	T	GF	GA
Alabama–Huntsville	30	24	3	3	201	64
Findlay	28	11	16	1		
Minnesota–Crookston	29	12	15	2	100	143

Note: the records of teams who were members of Division III conferences during the season can be found here.

== 1998 NCAA Tournament ==
National Championship; March 13–14
E	Alabama–Huntsville	6	5	-
W	Bemidji State	2	2	-

Note: * denotes overtime period(s)
Note: Mini-games in italics

== See also ==
- 1997–98 NCAA Division I men's ice hockey season
- 1997–98 NCAA Division III men's ice hockey season
