= 1996 NCAA Division II men's ice hockey tournament =

Sports tournament

- Teams: 2
- Finals site: Von Braun Center, Huntsville, Alabama
- Champions: Alabama–Huntsville Chargers (1st title)
- Runner-up: Bemidji State Beavers (6th title game)
- Winning coach: Doug Ross (1st title)
- Attendance: 12,417

The 1996 NCAA Men's Division II Ice Hockey Tournament involved 2 schools playing in a best of three game series to determine the national champion of men's NCAA Division II college ice hockey. A total of 2 games were played, hosted by Alabama-Huntville.

Alabama–Huntsville, coached by Doug Ross, won the national title over three-time defending champion Bemidji State, two games to none.

Tony Guzzo, was the tournament leading scorer with five points.

== Tournament Format ==
One eastern and one western team were invited to play a modified best-of-three tournament. In the first two games the teams would be awarded points (2 points for a win, one point for a tie) and whichever team had the most points would be the champion. If the teams were tied after two games then a 20-minute mini-game would be played to determine the champion.

== Qualifying teams ==
Team	Record
Alabama–Huntsville	24–0–3
Bemidji State	16–8–4

== Tournament Games ==
National Championship; March 8–9
E	Alabama–Huntsville	7	3	-
W	Bemidji State	1	0	-

Note: * denotes overtime period(s)
Note: Mini-games in italics

== Tournament Awards ==
None Awarded
