= 1979 NCAA Division II men's ice hockey tournament =

- Teams: 4
- Finals site: Merrimack Athletics Complex, North Andover, Massachusetts
- Champions: Lowell Chiefs (1st title)
- Runner-up: Mankato State Mavericks (1st title game)
- Semifinalists: Illinois-Chicago Flames (1st Frozen Four); Salem State Vikings (1st Frozen Four)
- Winning coach: Bill Riley Jr. (1st title)
- MOP: Craig MacTavish (Lowell)
- Attendance: 3,012

The 1979 NCAA Men's Division II Ice Hockey Tournament involved 4 schools playing in single-elimination play to determine the national champion of men's NCAA Division II college ice hockey. A total of 4 games were played, hosted by Merrimack College.

The University of Lowell, coached by Bill Riley, won the national title with a 6-4 victory in the final game over Mankato State.

Craig MacTavish, of the University of Lowell, was named the Most Outstanding Player and was the high scorer of the tournament with six points (4 goals, 2 assists).

== Qualifying teams ==
Due to the lack of conferences and tournaments for western schools the NCAA held a Western regional tournament to help select teams for the national tournament. The Western regional tournament is not considered as part of the NCAA championship but is included here for reference. No automatic bids were offered.

=== Western Championship Tournament ===
Regional semifinals
Mankato State	4
St. Cloud State	3
Chicago Circle	10
Hamline	4

Regional final
Mankato State	4
Chicago Circle	4

=== National Tournament Teams ===
Team	Record
Illinois–Chicago	16–11–1
Lowell	25–6–0
Mankato State	24–11–1
Salem State	23–9–1

== Bracket ==
National semifinals March 15–16
Mankato State	5
Salem State	3
Lowell	10
Illinois-Chicago	6

National championship March 17
Mankato State	4
Lowell	6
Third place
Salem State	3
Illinois-Chicago	4*

Note: * denotes overtime period(s)

== All-Tournament team ==
- G: Brian Doyle (University of Lowell)
- D: Mike Weinkauf (Mankato State)
- D: Mike O'Connor (University of Lowell)
- F: Rob Feenie (Illinois-Chicago)
- F: Craig MacTavish (University of Lowell)
- F: Tom Jacobs (University of Lowell)
