= 1993 NCAA Division II men's ice hockey tournament =

- Teams: 2
- Finals site: John S. Glas Field House, Bemidji, Minnesota
- Champions: Bemidji State Beavers (2nd title)
- Runner-up: Mercyhurst Lakers (1st title game)
- Winning coach: Bob Peters (2nd title)
- Attendance: 2,958

The 1993 NCAA Men's Division II Ice Hockey Tournament involved 2 schools playing in a best of three game series to determine the national champion of men's NCAA Division II college ice hockey. A total of 2 games were played, hosted by Bemidji State.

Bemidji State, coached by Bob Peters, won the national title over Mercyhurst, two games to none.

Jamie Erb, of Bemidji State, was the high scorer of the tournament with seven points (4 goals, 3 assists).

== Tournament Format ==
One eastern and one western team were invited to play a modified best-of-three tournament. In the first two games the teams would be awarded points (2 points for a win, one point for a tie) and whichever team had the most points would be the champion. If the teams were tied after two games then a 20-minute mini-game would be played to determine the champion.

== Qualifying teams ==
Team	Record
Bemidji State	22–7–0
Mercyhurst	18–8–0

== Tournament Games ==
National Championship; March 19–20
W	Bemidji State	10	5	-
E	Mercyhurst	6	0	-

== Tournament Awards ==
None Awarded
