= 1999 NCAA Division II men's ice hockey tournament =

- Teams: 2
- Finals site: C. Douglas Cairns Arena, Colchester, Vermont
- Champions: Saint Michael's Purple Knights (1st title)
- Runner-up: New Hampshire College Penmen (1st title game)
- Winning coach: Lou DiMasi (1st title)
- Attendance: 2,233

The 1999 NCAA Men's Division II Ice Hockey Tournament involved 2 schools playing in a best of three game series to determine the national champion of men's NCAA Division II college ice hockey. A total of 2 games were played, hosted by Saint Michael's College.

Saint Michael's, coached by Lou DiMasi, won the national title over New Hampshire College, with one win and one tie.

Chuck Croteau and Jason harrington, were the tournament's leading scorers with four points each.

After the championship the tournament was discontinued due to lack of interest from schools at the Division II level.

== Tournament Format ==
Two teams were invited to play a modified best-of-three tournament. In the first two games the teams would be awarded points (2 points for a win, one point for a tie) and whichever team had the most points would be the champion. If the teams were tied after two games then a 20-minute mini-game would be played to determine the champion.

== Qualifying teams ==
Team	Record
New Hampshire College	17–7–1
Saint Michael's	15–10–1

== Tournament Games ==
National Championship; March 12–13
1	New Hampshire College	4*	5	-
2	Saint Michael's	4	8	-

Note: * denotes overtime period(s)
Note: Mini-games in italics

== Tournament Awards ==
None Awarded
