= 2022–23 NCAA Division II men's ice hockey season =

- Duration: October 15, 2022– March 4, 2023
- NCAA tournament: 2023

The 2022–23 NCAA Division II men's ice hockey season began on October 15, 2022, and concluded on March 4, 2023. This was the 41st season of second-tier college ice hockey.

== Regular season ==
Shortly after the conclusion of the previous year, the administration at Stonehill announced that they would be promoting all of their programs to Division I status for the 2022–23 academic year. As a result, the Division II field was reduced to six active ice hockey programs.

=== Season tournaments ===
Tournament	Dates	Teams	Champion
Western Massachusetts Invitational	October 28–29	4	Franklin Pierce
Worcester City Cup	October 28, 30	4	Nichols
Castleton Invitational	November 25–26	4	Saint Anselm
PAL Stovepipe	November 26–27	4	New England College
Oswego State Classic	December 30–31	4	Adrian

=== Standings ===
2022–23 Northeast-10 Conference ice hockey standings
	Conference									Overall					
	GP	W	L	T	OTW	OTL	PTS	GF	GA	GP	W	L	T	GF	GA
Saint Anselm †*	20	13	5	2	1	0	40	73	44	28	18	8	2	102	67
Saint Michael's	20	12	7	1	0	1	38	70	53	24	13	10	1	83	70
Assumption	20	11	8	1	0	1	35	70	61	28	14	13	1	94	94
Southern New Hampshire	20	9	11	0	1	2	28	59	73	24	10	14	0	69	87
Franklin Pierce	20	7	11	2	1	0	22	68	83	26	8	16	2	82	110
Post	20	4	14	2	1	0	13	49	75	25	5	18	2	61	98
Championship: March 4 † indicates conference regular season champion * indicates conference tournament champion

== See also ==
- 2022–23 NCAA Division I men's ice hockey season
- 2022–23 NCAA Division III men's ice hockey season
