= 1979–80 NCAA Division II men's ice hockey season =

- Duration: November 1979– March 15, 1980
- NCAA tournament: 1980
- National championship: Murray Athletic Center; Elmira, New York
- NCAA champion: Mankato State

The 1979–80 NCAA Division II men's ice hockey season began in November 1979 and concluded on March 15 of the following year. This was the 16th season of second-tier college ice hockey.

== Regular season ==
=== Season tournaments ===
| Tournament | Dates | Teams | Champion |
|---|---|---|---|
| Elmira Invitational | November 9–10 | 4 | St. Lawrence |
| Oswego Classic | November 16–17 | 4 | Merrimack |
| Merrimack Thanksgiving Tournament | November 23–24 | 4 | Merrimack |
| Union Tournament | December 21–22 | 4 | Holy Cross |
| Codfish Bowl | December 28–29 | 4 | Lowell |
| Blue-Gold Tournament | January 4–5 | 4 | Merrimack |
| Salem State Tournament | January 4–5 | 4 | Saint Anselm |
| Crusader Classic | January 5–6 | 4 | Holy Cross |
| Down East Classic | January 10–11 | 4 | |
| Teapot Tournament | January 7, 14 | 4 | |

=== Standings ===
1979–80 ECAC 2 standings
| | Conference | | | | | | | Overall | | | | | |
| | GP | W | L | T | Pct. | GF | GA | GP | W | L | T | GF | GA |
East Region
| Bowdoin † | 18 | 14 | 2 | 2 | .833 | 99 | 47 | 26 | 19 | 5 | 2 | | |
| Lowell | 23 | 19 | 4 | 0 | .826 | 183 | 76 | 30 | 23 | 7 | 0 | 212 | 107 |
| Salem State | 25 | 19 | 6 | 0 | .760 | 104 | 72 | 29 | 21 | 8 | 0 | | |
| Holy Cross | 21 | 15 | 6 | 0 | .714 | 120 | 70 | 30 | 21 | 9 | 0 | 182 | 100 |
| Babson | 24 | 15 | 7 | 2 | .667 | 78 | 63 | 28 | 17 | 8 | 3 | 95 | 80 |
| Merrimack * | 24 | 14 | 8 | 2 | .625 | 156 | 89 | 38 | 22 | 13 | 3 | 225 | 146 |
| New Haven | 20 | 12 | 8 | 0 | .600 | | | 25 | 15 | 10 | 0 | | |
| Colby | 20 | 12 | 8 | 0 | .600 | 89 | 63 | 23 | 12 | 11 | 0 | | |
| American International | 24 | 12 | 12 | 0 | .500 | 104 | 102 | 27 | 14 | 13 | 0 | | |
| Connecticut | 19 | 9 | 10 | 0 | .474 | 90 | 95 | 24 | 13 | 11 | 0 | 115 | 109 |
| New England College | 21 | 9 | 12 | 0 | .429 | 105 | 111 | 22 | 9 | 13 | 0 | | |
| Saint Anselm | 21 | 6 | 15 | 0 | .286 | 115 | 138 | 23 | 8 | 15 | 0 | 130 | 142 |
| Bridgewater State | 16 | 4 | 12 | 0 | .250 | 71 | 100 | | | | | | |
| Bryant | 18 | 2 | 16 | 0 | .111 | 96 | 147 | | | | | | |
| Framingham State | 17 | 1 | 16 | 0 | .059 | 53 | 136 | 26 | 6 | 20 | 0 | | |
| Boston State | 23 | 0 | 23 | 0 | .000 | 51 | 209 | 26 | 1 | 25 | 0 | | |
West Region
| Elmira † | 21 | 18 | 2 | 1 | .881 | 139 | 62 | 31 | 25 | 6 | 2 | 236 | 102 |
| Plattsburgh State | 25 | 18 | 5 | 2 | .760 | 143 | 94 | 31 | 20 | 9 | 2 | 161 | 122 |
| Oswego State * | 23 | 16 | 7 | 0 | .696 | 148 | 104 | 35 | 27 | 8 | 0 | 245 | 146 |
| Middlebury | 19 | 11 | 5 | 3 | .658 | 78 | 66 | 25 | 15 | 7 | 3 | 105 | 85 |
| Westfield State | 20 | 12 | 8 | 0 | .600 | 117 | 113 | 29 | 21 | 8 | 0 | | |
| Army | 26 | 15 | 10 | 1 | .596 | 149 | 88 | 32 | 19 | 12 | 1 | 205 | 141 |
| North Adams State | 20 | 11 | 9 | 0 | .550 | 101 | 90 | 24 | 14 | 10 | 0 | | |
| Geneseo State | 17 | 9 | 8 | 0 | .529 | | | 28 | 16 | 11 | 1 | | |
| Union | 27 | 12 | 14 | 1 | .463 | 92 | 114 | 28 | 12 | 15 | 1 | | |
| Williams | 21 | 9 | 12 | 0 | .429 | 91 | 105 | 21 | 9 | 12 | 0 | | |
| Norwich | 21 | 9 | 12 | 0 | .429 | 103 | 117 | 25 | 12 | 13 | 0 | 138 | 127 |
| Buffalo | 20 | 6 | 14 | 0 | .300 | 81 | 97 | 24 | 9 | 15 | 0 | | |
| Hamilton | 19 | 5 | 14 | 0 | .263 | 79 | 115 | 23 | 7 | 16 | 0 | | |
| Cortland State | 18 | 4 | 14 | 0 | .222 | 55 | 122 | | | | | | |
| Brockport State | 15 | 3 | 12 | 0 | .200 | 55 | 87 | 22 | 9 | 13 | 0 | 108 | 109 |
| Potsdam State | 17 | 2 | 15 | 0 | .118 | 57 | 99 | 24 | 6 | 18 | 0 | | |
Championships: March 8, 1980 † indicates division regular season champion * indicates conference tournament champions

1979–80 NCAA Division II Independent ice hockey standings
| | Overall record | | | | | |
| | GP | W | L | T | GF | GA |
|---|---|---|---|---|---|---|
| Alaska–Anchorage | 8 | 8 | 0 | 0 | 71 | 19 |
| Alaska–Fairbanks | 21 | 7 | 14 | 0 | | |
| Illinois-Chicago | 27 | 14 | 13 | 0 | | |
| Lake Forest | 24 | 11 | 13 | 0 | 142 | 114 |
| Mankato State | 40 | 30 | 9 | 1 | 291 | 144 |
| St. Cloud State | 29 | 19 | 9 | 1 | 152 | 118 |

1979–80 NYCHA standings
| | Conference | | | | | | | Overall | | | | | |
| | GP | W | L | T | Pts | GF | GA | GP | W | L | T | GF | GA |
|---|---|---|---|---|---|---|---|---|---|---|---|---|---|
| Elmira † | 14 | 13 | 0 | 1 | 27 | 99 | 44 | 31 | 25 | 6 | 2 | 236 | 102 |
| Oswego State | 14 | 12 | 2 | 0 | 24 | 94 | 52 | 35 | 27 | 8 | 0 | 245 | 146 |
| Plattsburgh State | 14 | 10 | 3 | 1 | 21 | 92 | 61 | 31 | 20 | 9 | 2 | 161 | 122 |
| Brockport State | 14 | 3 | 11 | 0 | 6 | 52 | 80 | 22 | 9 | 13 | 0 | 108 | 109 |
| Buffalo | | | | | | | | 24 | 9 | 15 | 0 | | |
| Cortland State | | | | | | | | | | | | | |
| Geneseo State | | | | | | | | 28 | 16 | 11 | 1 | | |
| Potsdam State | | | | | | | | 24 | 6 | 18 | 0 | | |
† indicates conference regular season champions

1979–80 Minnesota Intercollegiate Athletic Conference ice hockey standings
| | Conference | | | | | | | Overall | | | | | |
| | GP | W | L | T | Pts | GF | GA | GP | W | L | T | GF | GA |
|---|---|---|---|---|---|---|---|---|---|---|---|---|---|
| Augsburg † | 16 | 14 | 2 | 0 | 28 | | | 28 | 20 | 8 | 0 | | |
| Concordia (MN) | 16 | 12 | 3 | 1 | 25 | | | 27 | 15 | 11 | 1 | | |
| St. Thomas | 16 | 10 | 5 | 1 | 21 | | | 28 | 14 | 13 | 1 | | |
| Gustavus Adolphus | 16 | 10 | 6 | 0 | 20 | | | 26 | 15 | 11 | 0 | | |
| Hamline | 16 | 8 | 7 | 1 | 15 | | | | | | | | |
| Saint John's | 16 | 7 | 9 | 0 | 14 | | | 27 | 9 | 18 | 0 | | |
| St. Olaf | 16 | 4 | 11 | 1 | 9 | | | 28 | 9 | 17 | 2 | | |
| Saint Mary's | 16 | 4 | 12 | 0 | 8 | | | 27 | 8 | 19 | 0 | | |
| Bethel | 16 | 1 | 15 | 0 | 2 | | | 25 | 2 | 23 | 0 | | |
† indicates conference regular season champion

== 1980 NCAA tournament ==
Semifinals; March 13–14
W1 | Mankato State | 8
E2 | Lowell | 1
E1 | Merrimack | 1
E3 | Elmira | 4

National championship March 15
W1 | Mankato State | 5
E3 | Elmira | 2
Third-place game
E1 | Merrimack | 7
E2 | Lowell | 8

Note: * denotes overtime period(s)

== Drafted players ==
| Round | Pick | Player | College | Conference | NHL team |
|---|---|---|---|---|---|
| 6 | 108 | Mark Kumpel | Lowell | ECAC 2 | Quebec Nordiques |

† incoming freshman

== See also ==
- 1979–80 NCAA Division I men's ice hockey season
- 1979–80 NCAA Division III men's ice hockey season
