= 1995 NCAA Division II men's ice hockey tournament =

- Teams: 2
- Finals site: Mercyhurst Ice Center, Erie, Pennsylvania
- Champions: Bemidji State Beavers (4th title)
- Runner-up: Mercyhurst Lakers (2nd title game)
- Winning coach: Bob Peters (4th title)
- Attendance: 3,000

The 1995 NCAA Men's Division II Ice Hockey Tournament involved 2 schools playing in a best of three game series to determine the national champion of men's NCAA Division II college ice hockey. A total of 2 games were played, hosted by Mercyhurst University.

Bemidji State, coached by Bob Peters, won the national title over Mercyhurst, two games to none.

Eric Fulton & Jude Boulianne, of Bemidji State, were the high scorers of the tournament with five points.

== Tournament Format ==
One eastern and one western team were invited to play a modified best-of-three tournament. In the first two games the teams would be awarded points (2 points for a win, one point for a tie) and whichever team had the most points would be the champion. If the teams were tied after two games then a 20-minute mini-game would be played to determine the champion.

== Qualifying teams ==
Team	Record
Bemidji State	23–7–2
Mercyhurst	21–1–2

== Tournament Games ==
National Championship; March 17–18
W	Bemidji State	6	5	-
E	Mercyhurst	2	4	-

Note: * denotes overtime period(s)
Note: Mini-games in italics

== Tournament Awards ==
None Awarded
