= 1981–82 NCAA Division II men's ice hockey season =

- Duration: November 1981– March 20, 1982
- NCAA tournament: 1982
- National championship: Tully Forum; North Billerica, Massachusetts
- NCAA champion: Lowell

The 1981–82 NCAA Division II men's ice hockey season began in November 1981 and concluded on March 20, 1982. This was the 18th season of second-tier college ice hockey.

Boston State began merging with Massachusetts–Boston in September 1981. Because of this Boston State did not field a team for the 1981–82 season though they were still considered members of ECAC 2. After the merger was completed Massachusetts–Boston promoted their program from Division III to Division II beginning with the 1982–83 season.

== Regular season ==
=== Season tournaments ===
Tournament	Dates	Teams	Champion
Elmira Tournament	November 13–14	4	Guelph
Granite State Tournament	November 13–14	4	New England College
Crusader Classic	November 26–27	4	Holy Cross
Merrimack Thanksgiving Tournament	November 27–28	4	Merrimack
Miller Invitational	December 4–5	4	Michigan–Dearborn
Codfish Bowl		4	Babson
I Love New York Tournament	December 29–30	4	Clarkson
Blue-Gold Tournament	January 2–3	4	Merrimack
Salem State Tournament	January 2–3	4	
Williams Invitational	January 2–3	4	Plattsburgh State
Teapot Tournament	January 19, 26	4	Lowell

=== Standings ===
1981–82 ECAC 2 standings
	Conference							Overall					
	GP	W	L	T	Pct.	GF	GA	GP	W	L	T	GF	GA
East Region
Lowell †*	20	19	1	0	.950	158	49	35	31	4	0	247	94
Babson	22	16	5	1	.750			29	20	7	2	133	103
Merrimack	26	17	8	1	.673	136	101	40	22	17	1	188	175
New England College	25	15	9	1	.620			26	15	10	1		
Colby	21	12	7	2	.619			23	12	9	2		
Bowdoin	19	11	8	0	.579			25	13	12	0		
Salem State	26	14	11	1	.558			31	16	14	1		
Holy Cross	24	12	10	2	.542	116	124	33	16	15	2	152	182
New Haven	21	10	11	0	.476			25	12	12	1		
Saint Anselm	20	8	12	0	.400	108	132	25	12	13	0	147	151
Connecticut	16	5	11	0	.313	74	92	20	9	11	0	109	106
American International	19	4	15	0	.211			27	7	20	0		
Boston State ^	15	1	14	0	.067			21	2	19	0		
Framingham State	15	0	15	0	.000			25	5	20	0		
West Region
Oswego State †	22	17	5	0	.773	147	98	30	21	9	0	176	137
Plattsburgh State *	25	18	6	1	.740	175	102	40	25	13	2	246	180
North Adams State	23	16	7	0	.696			29	20	8	1		
RIT	24	16	7	1	.688	132	86	31	20	10	1	164	118
Norwich	25	16	9	0	.640			33	17	15	1	163	147
Williams	18	10	7	1	.583			22	12	11	1		
Union	24	13	10	1	.563			29	13	15	1		
Elmira	22	11	11	0	.500	105	107	29	12	17	0	122	152
Westfield State	21	9	12	0	.429			18	14	4	0		
Middlebury	17	6	9	2	.412	59	75	23	9	11	3	90	101
Hamilton	19	7	12	0	.368			24	11	13	0		
Brockport State	19	4	15	0	.211	87	112	27	8	19	0	134	156
Buffalo								23	7	15	1		
Cortland State								29	6	22	1		
Geneseo State								26	10	16	0		
Potsdam State								27	12	13	2		
Championships: March 7, 1982 † indicates division regular season champion * indicates conference tournament champions^ Boston State did not field a team due to the college merging with Massachusetts–Boston

1981–82 NCAA Division II Independent ice hockey standings
	Overall record					
	GP	W	L	T	GF	GA
Alaska–Anchorage	27	15	12	0	119	111
Alaska–Fairbanks	23	4	19	0	70	159
Lake Forest	24	9	14	1	111	132
St. Scholastica	29	17	11	1		
Wisconsin–Stevens Point	23	2	20	1		

1981–82 Minnesota Intercollegiate Athletic Conference ice hockey standings
	Conference							Overall					
	GP	W	L	T	Pts	GF	GA	GP	W	L	T	GF	GA
Augsburg †	16	16	0	0	32			30	28	1	1		
Gustavus Adolphus	16	13	3	0	26			31	22	9	0		
St. Olaf	16	10	6	0	20			27	13	13	1		
Concordia (MN)	16	9	7	0	18			27	13	14	0		
Hamline	16	8	8	0	16								
Bethel	16	7	9	0	16			30	15	15	0		
St. Thomas	16	4	12	0	8			27	8	19	0		
Saint Mary's	16	3	13	0	6								
Saint John's	16	3	13	0	6			24	4	20	0		
† indicates conference regular season champion

1981–82 Northern Collegiate Hockey Association standings
	Conference							Overall					
	GP	W	L	T	Pct.	GF	GA	GP	W	L	T	GF	GA
Bemidji State †	20	16	3	1	.825	90	49	31	25	5	1	173	76
Mankato State	18	11	6	1	.639	78	64	32	22	9	1	190	101
Wisconsin–River Falls	20	11	9	0	.550	89	95	34	21	13	0	184	152
St. Cloud State	20	9	11	0	.450	87	74	29	14	15	0	134	107
Wisconsin–Eau Claire	20	6	13	1	.325	57	82	32	12	19	1	132	128
Wisconsin–Superior	18	3	14	1	.194	48	103	33	12	20	1	135	167
† indicates conference regular season champion

1981–82 NYCHA standings
	Conference							Overall					
	GP	W	L	T	Pts	GF	GA	GP	W	L	T	GF	GA
Oswego State †	14	12	2	0	24	97	53	30	21	9	0	176	137
RIT	14	11	3	0	22	84	52	31	20	10	1	164	118
Elmira	14	10	4	0	20	71	51	29	12	17	0	122	152
Potsdam State	14	7	6	1	15			27	12	13	2		
Brockport State	14	5	9	0	10			27	8	19	0	134	156
Cortland State	14	4	10	0	8								
Buffalo	13	3	9	1	7			23	7	15	1		
Geneseo State	13	3	10	0	6			26	10	16	0		
† indicates conference regular season champion

== 1982 NCAA Tournament ==
Quarterfinals; March 12–14
Lowell	9	3	12
Oswego State	5	4	9
Merrimack	5	6	11
Mankato State	3	4	7
Plattsburgh State	4	1	5
Babson	3	1	4
Gustavus Adolphus	7	9	16
St. Scholastica	4	1	5

Semifinals; March 18–19
Lowell	4
Merrimack	3
Plattsburgh State	4
Gustavus Adolphus	3

National Championship; March 20
Lowell	6
Plattsburgh State	1
Third place
Merrimack	5
Gustavus Adolphus	8

Note: * denotes overtime period(s)

== See also ==
- 1981–82 NCAA Division I men's ice hockey season
- 1981–82 NCAA Division III men's ice hockey season
