= 1980 NCAA Division II men's ice hockey tournament =

- Teams: 4
- Finals site: Murray Athletic Center, Elmira, New York
- Champions: Mankato State Mavericks (1st title)
- Runner-up: Elmira Soaring Eagles (1st title game)
- Semifinalists: Lowell Chiefs (2nd Frozen Four); Merrimack Warriors (2nd Frozen Four)
- Winning coach: Don Brose (1st title)
- MOP: Steve Carroll (Mankato State)
- Attendance: 5,232

The 1980 NCAA Men's Division II Ice Hockey Tournament involved 4 schools playing in single-elimination play to determine the national champion of men's NCAA Division II college ice hockey. A total of 4 games were played, hosted by Elmira College.

Mankato State, coached by Don Brose, won the national title with a 5-2 victory in the final game over Elmira.

Steve Carroll, of Mankato State, was named the Most Outstanding Player and Mike Carr, of the University of Lowell, was the high scorer of the tournament with six points (3 goals, 3 assists).

== Qualifying teams ==
Due to the lack of conferences and tournaments for western schools the NCAA held a Western regional tournament to help select teams for the national tournament. The Western regional tournament is not considered as part of the NCAA championship but is included here for reference. No automatic bids were offered.

=== Western Regional Tournament ===
Regional semifinals
Mankato State	5
Gustavus Adolphus	2
St. Scholastica	8
St. Cloud State	4

Regional final
Mankato State	14
St. Scholastica	6

=== National Tournament Teams ===
Team	Record
Elmira	24–5–2
Lowell	22–6–0
Mankato State	28–9–1
Merrimack	22–11–3

== Bracket ==
National semifinals March 13–14
Elmira	4
Merrimack	1
Mankato State	8
Lowell	1

National championship March 15
Elmira	2
Mankato State	5
Third place
Lowell	8
Merrimack	7

Note: * denotes overtime period(s)

== All-Tournament team ==
- G: Steve Carroll (Mankato State)
- D: Mike Weinkauf (Mankato State)
- D: Chuck Blomquist (Elmira)
- F: Steve Forliti (Mankato State)
- F: Tom Tidman (University of Lowell)
- F: Dave Drew (Elmira)
- C: Jeff Cristina (Elmira)
