= 1978–79 NCAA Division II men's ice hockey season =

- Duration: November 1978– March 17, 1979
- NCAA tournament: 1979
- National championship: Merrimack Athletics Complex; North Andover, Massachusetts
- NCAA champion: Lowell

The 1978–79 NCAA Division II men's ice hockey season began in November 1978 and concluded on March 17, 1979. This was the 15th season of second-tier college ice hockey.

== Regular season ==
=== Season tournaments ===
Tournament	Dates	Teams	Champion
Billerica Forum Thanksgiving Tournament	November 22–23	4	Plattsburgh State
Trinity Invitational	December 1–2	4	Connecticut
Belco Tournament	December 22–23	4	Holy Cross
Codfish Bowl	December 27–28	4	Lowell
Cornell Holiday Festival	December 28–29	4	Cornell
Blue-Gold Tournament	January 5–6	4	American International
Crusader Classic	January 6–7	4	Maine
Salem State Tournament	January 6–7	4	Lowell

=== Standings ===
1978–79 ECAC 2 standings
	Conference							Overall					
	GP	W	L	T	Pct.	GF	GA	GP	W	L	T	GF	GA
East Region
Lowell *	26	21	5	0	.808	191	89	33	27	6	0	230	119
Merrimack	25	20	5	0	.800	168	74	35	24	10	1	231	121
Maine	20	16	4	0	.800	114	64	30	22	8	0	176	104
Salem State †	27	18	8	1	.685			35	23	11	1		
Holy Cross	23	15	8	0	.619	121	75	28	18	10	0	157	92
New Haven	21	13	7	1	.643			26	17	8	1		
Bowdoin	17	10	7	0	.588			25	13	12	0		
Babson	19	11	8	0	.579			23	15	8	0		
American International	23	13	10	0	.565			25	13	12	0		
Saint Anselm	24	11	13	0	.458	130	146	26	11	15	0	137	159
Colby	23	10	13	0	.435			23	10	13	0		
New England College	21	7	12	2	.381			25	10	13	2		
Bridgewater State	16	5	11	0	.313			24	8	15	1		
Connecticut	19	5	14	0	.263	61	95	25	11	14	0	102	112
Bryant	23	6	17	0	.261			27	8	19	0		
Boston State	22	4	18	0	.182			26	7	19	0		
West Region
Plattsburgh State †	24	22	2	0	.917	193	84	29	26	3	0	219	97
Elmira	25	21	4	0	.840	191	71	31	26	5	0	244	85
Middlebury *	19	14	4	1	.763	102	60	26	19	6	1	138	83
Westfield State	19	14	4	1	.763			28	20	8	0		
Norwich	23	15	8	0	.652	118	92	29	19	10	0	152	111
Buffalo	19	11	8	0	.579			27	15	12	0		
Oswego State	24	12	12	0	.500	123	115	27	13	15	0	143	145
Brockport State	16	8	8	0	.500	52	86	25	13	12	0	112	136
Geneseo State	15	7	8	0	.467			25	13	12	0		
North Adams State	18	8	10	0	.444			24	12	12	0		
Williams	18	8	10	0	.444			23	11	12	0		
Army	21	6	15	0	.286	80	131	28	7	21	0	110	174
Hamilton	20	5	15	0	.250			23	7	16	0		
Union	25	5	20	0	.200			26	5	21	0		
Cortland State	17	3	14	0	.176			23	5	18	0		
Potsdam State	19	2	17	0	.105			24	4	20	0		
Massachusetts	20	1	18	1	.075	68	158	20	1	18	1	68	158
Championships: March 10, 1979 † indicates division regular season champion * indicates conference tournament champions

1978–79 NCAA Division II Independent ice hockey standings
	Overall record					
	GP	W	L	T	GF	GA
Chicago State						
Illinois-Chicago	30	17	12	1		
Lake Forest	24	19	5	0	194	90
Mankato State	38	25	12	1	223	148
Oberlin						
St. Cloud State	24	10	13	1	128	122

1978–79 NYCHA standings
	Conference							Overall					
	GP	W	L	T	Pts	GF	GA	GP	W	L	T	GF	GA
Plattsburgh State †	14	13	1	0	26	121	50	22	18	4	0	157	79
Elmira †	14	13	1	0	26	125	40	31	26	5	0	244	85
Oswego State	14	8	6	0	16	80	67	27	13	15	0	143	145
Brockport State	14	6	8	0	12	44	81	25	13	12	0	112	136
Buffalo								27	15	12	0		
Cortland State								23	5	18	0		
Geneseo State								25	13	12	0		
Potsdam State								24	4	20	0		
† indicates conference regular season champion

1978–79 Minnesota Intercollegiate Athletic Conference ice hockey standings
	Conference							Overall					
	GP	W	L	T	Pts	GF	GA	GP	W	L	T	GF	GA
Augsburg †	14	13	0	1	27			28	23	4	1		
Concordia (MN)	14	9	5	0	18			27	15	12	0		
Gustavus Adolphus	14	9	5	0	18			28	14	14	0		
St. Thomas	13	7	6	0	14			26	10	16	0		
Saint John's	14	6	7	1	13			26	10	15	1		
Hamline	14	5	9	0	10			27	12	15	0		
Saint Mary's	13	4	9	0	8			25	8	17	0		
St. Olaf	14	1	13	0	2			27	4	23	0		
Bethel	x	x	x	x	x			22	5	17	0		
† indicates conference regular season champion

== 1979 NCAA tournament ==
Semifinals; March 15–16
W1	Mankato State	5
E2	Salem State	3
E1	Lowell	10
W2	Illinois–Chicago	6

National championship March 17
W1	Mankato State	4
E1	Lowell	6
Third-place game
W2	Illinois–Chicago	4*
E2	Salem State	3

Note: * denotes overtime period(s)

== See also ==
- 1978–79 NCAA Division I men's ice hockey season
- 1978–79 NCAA Division III men's ice hockey season
