= 1998 NCAA Division II men's ice hockey tournament =

- Teams: 2
- Finals site: Von Braun Center, Huntsville, Alabama
- Champions: Alabama–Huntsville Chargers (2nd title)
- Runner-up: Bemidji State Beavers (8th title game)
- Winning coach: Doug Ross (2nd title)
- Attendance: 9,484

The 1998 NCAA Men's Division II Ice Hockey Tournament involved 2 schools playing in a best of three game series to determine the national champion of men's NCAA Division II college ice hockey. A total of 2 games were played, hosted by Alabama-Huntville.

Alabama–Huntsville, coached by Doug Ross, won the national title over Bemidji State, two games to none.

Mike Hamlin, John McCabe, Colin Schmidt and Shane Stewart, were the tournament's leading scorers with three points each.

== Tournament Format ==
One eastern and one western team were invited to play a modified best-of-three tournament. In the first two games the teams would be awarded points (2 points for a win, one point for a tie) and whichever team had the most points would be the champion. If the teams were tied after two games then a 20-minute mini-game would be played to determine the champion.

== Qualifying teams ==
Team	Record
Alabama–Huntsville	24–3–3
Bemidji State	22–8–2

== Tournament Games ==
National Championship; March 12–14
E	Alabama–Huntsville	6	5	-
W	Bemidji State	2	2	-

Note: * denotes overtime period(s)
Note: Mini-games in italics

== Tournament Awards ==
None Awarded
