= 1981 NCAA Division II men's ice hockey tournament =

- Teams: 4
- Finals site: Merrimack Athletics Complex; North Andover, Massachusetts
- Champions: Lowell Chiefs (2nd title)
- Runner-up: Plattsburgh Cardinals (1st title game)
- Semifinalists: Mankato State Mavericks (4th Frozen Four); Concordia Cobbers (1st Frozen Four)
- Winning coach: Bill Riley Jr. (2nd title)
- MOP: Tom Mulligan (Lowell)
- Attendance: 3,769

The 1981 NCAA Men's Division II Ice Hockey Tournament involved 4 schools playing in single-elimination play to determine the national champion of men's NCAA Division II college ice hockey. A total of 4 games were played, hosted by Merrimack College.

The University of Lowell, coached by Bill Riley, won the national title with a 5-4 victory in the final game over Plattsburgh.

Tom Mulligan, of the University of Lowell, was named the Most Outstanding Player and was the high scorer of the tournament with seven points (3 goals, 4 assists).

== Qualifying teams ==
Due to the lack of conferences and tournaments for western schools the NCAA held a Western regional tournament to help select teams for the national tournament. The Western regional tournament is not considered as part of the NCAA championship but is included here for reference. No automatic bids were offered.

=== Western Regional Tournament ===
Regional Series
Gustavus Adolphus	2	6*
Mankato State	3	4
Concordia (MN)	4	5
St. Cloud State	5	2

=== National Tournament Teams ===
Team	Record
Concordia (MN)	21–7–1
Lowell	25–5–0
Mankato State	27–10–0
Plattsburgh State	26–3–2

== Bracket ==
National Semifinals; March 12–13
Plattsburgh State	10
Concordia (MN)	4
Lowell	8*
Mankato State	7

National Championship; March 14
Plattsburgh State	4
Lowell	5
Third place
Mankato State	9
Concordia (MN)	7

Note: * denotes overtime period(s)

== All-Tournament Team ==
- G: Rick Strack (Plattsburgh State)
- D: Tom Mulligan (Lowell)
- D: Tod Wescott (Plattsburgh State)
- F: Dean Jenkins (Lowell)
- F: Pierre Brunett (Plattsburgh State)
- F: Mike Carr (Lowell)
