= 1980–81 NCAA Division II men's ice hockey season =

- Duration: November 1980– March 14, 1981
- NCAA tournament: 1981
- National championship: Merrimack Athletics Complex; North Andover, Massachusetts
- NCAA champion: Lowell

The 1980–81 NCAA Division II men's ice hockey season began in November 1980 and concluded on March 14, 1981. This was the 17th season of second-tier college ice hockey.

== Regular season ==
=== Season tournaments ===
Tournament	Dates	Teams	Champion
North Country Thanksgiving Festival	November 27–29	4	Clarkson
Merrimack Tournament	November 28–29	4	Plattsburgh State
Crusader Classic	December 6–7	4	Holy Cross
Union Holiday Tournament	December 19–20	4	Oswego State
Rensselaer Holiday Tournament	December 28–30	4	Maine
Codfish Bowl		4	Westfield State
Auld Lang Syne Classic	December 30–31	4	Dartmouth
Down East Classic	January 8–9	4	Maine
Teapot Tournament	January 5, 11	4	

=== Standings ===
1980–81 ECAC 2 standings
	Conference							Overall					
	GP	W	L	T	Pct.	GF	GA	GP	W	L	T	GF	GA
East Region
Lowell †*	21	18	3	0	.857	125	72	32	27	5	0	188	123
Merrimack	23	17	6	0	.739	141	90	35	19	16	0	191	174
Salem State	23	16	6	1	.717			31	20	10	1		
New England College	20	14	6	0	.700			24	16	8	0		
Colby	21	13	8	0	.619			23	13	10	0		
Bowdoin	18	11	7	0	.611			26	14	12	0		
Babson	20	11	9	0	.550	85	79	24	14	10	0	111	87
Holy Cross	22	11	11	0	.500	133	109	31	14	17	0	186	171
American International	22	11	11	0	.500			24	12	12	0		
Saint Anselm	20	7	12	1	.375	91	111	23	8	14	1	104	142
New Haven	21	6	15	0	.286			25	9	16	0		
Bridgewater State	5	1	4	0	.200			7	2	5	0		
Framingham State	11	1	10	0	.091			18	3	15	0		
Boston State	15	1	14	0	.067			20	3	17	0		
Connecticut	16	1	15	0	.063	49	83	21	5	16	0	79	104
West Region
Oswego State †	22	19	2	1	.886	136	73	30	26	3	1	205	97
Plattsburgh State *	22	17	3	2	.818	131	84	33	27	4	2	206	124
Elmira	25	18	7	0	.720	132	81	30	20	10	0	161	110
Williams	16	10	3	3	.719			23	16	4	3		
Norwich	23	14	8	1	.630	126	94	30	18	11	1	165	141
Westfield State	20	11	8	1	.575			29	17	11	1		
North Adams State	20	11	8	1	.575			23	14	8	1		
RIT	14	6	8	0	.429	62	63	24	14	10	0	108	80
Potsdam State	21	9	12	0	.429			24	12	12	0		
Brockport State	21	8	12	1	.405	99	109	25	11	13	1	122	120
Hamilton	19	6	10	3	.395			25	9	13	3		
Buffalo	21	7	12	0	.368			24	9	13	2		
Geneseo State	18	5	13	0	.278			25	8	17	0		
Middlebury	18	4	13	1	.250	57	78	23	7	15	1	77	96
Union	26	6	20	0	.231			28	6	21	1		
Cortland State	15	1	14	0	.067			20	2	18	0		
Championships: March 7, 1981 † indicates division regular season champion * indicates conference tournament champions

1980–81 NCAA Division II Independent ice hockey standings
	Overall record					
	GP	W	L	T	GF	GA
Alaska–Anchorage	24	14	10	0	126	104
Alaska–Fairbanks	24	1	23	0	-	-
Illinois-Chicago	26	9	17	0		
Lake Forest	24	12	12	0	128	135

1980–81 Northern Collegiate Hockey Association standings
	Conference							Overall					
	GP	W	L	T	Pts	GF	GA	GP	W	L	T	GF	GA
Mankato State †	16	11	5	0	.688	78	64	39	28	11	0	227	151
Bemidji State	12	8	4	0	.667	63	39	31	24	7	0	195	89
St. Cloud State	13	7	5	1	.577	54	48	31	19	11	1	169	110
Wisconsin–Superior	12	5	5	2	.500	64	61	31	15	13	3	162	164
Wisconsin–Eau Claire	17	5	11	1	.324	58	84	28	11	16	1	104	123
Wisconsin–River Falls	12	3	9	0	.250	41	61	30	11	19	0	127	151
† indicates conference regular season champion

1980–81 NYCHA standings
	Conference							Overall					
	GP	W	L	T	Pts	GF	GA	GP	W	L	T	GF	GA
Oswego State †	14	13	1	0	26	88	45	30	26	3	1	205	97
Plattsburgh State	14	11	2	1	23	93	59	33	27	4	2	206	124
Elmira	14	10	4	0	20	82	43	30	20	10	0	161	110
Brockport State	14	4	9	1	9	70	75	25	11	13	1	122	120
Buffalo								24	9	13	2		
Cortland State								20	2	18	0		
Geneseo State								25	8	17	0		
Potsdam State								24	12	12	0		
Note: Buffalo 4-5-2 in league as of 2/9, Geneseo 4-9-0 as of 2/22. † indicates conference regular season champion

1980–81 Minnesota Intercollegiate Athletic Conference ice hockey standings
	Conference							Overall					
	GP	W	L	T	Pts	GF	GA	GP	W	L	T	GF	GA
Augsburg †	16	12	4	0	24			30	24	6	0		
Concordia (MN) †	16	12	4	0	24			31	21	9	1		
Gustavus Adolphus	16	11	5	0	22			26	18	8	0		
St. Thomas	16	9	7	0	18			30	15	15	0		
Saint Mary's	16	8	8	0	16			29	13	16	0		
St. Olaf	15	7	7	1	15			30	13	16	1		
Hamline	15	7	8	0	14								
Bethel	16	3	12	1	5			27	3	23	1		
Saint John's	16	0	14	2	2			27	3	22	2		
† indicates conference regular season champion

== 1981 NCAA tournament ==
Semifinals; March 12–13
W1	Concordia	4
E2	Plattsburgh State	10
E1	Lowell	8*
W2	Mankato State	7

National championship March 14
E2	Plattsburgh State	4
E1	Lowell	5
Third-place game
W1	Concordia	7
W2	Mankato State	9

Note: * denotes overtime period(s)

== See also ==
- 1980–81 NCAA Division I men's ice hockey season
- 1980–81 NCAA Division III men's ice hockey season
