= 1982–83 NCAA Division II men's ice hockey season =

- Duration: November 1982– March 20, 1983
- NCAA tournament: 1983
- National championship: Tully Forum; North Billerica, Massachusetts
- NCAA champion: RIT

The 1982–83 NCAA Division II men's ice hockey season began in November 1981 and concluded on March 20 of the following year. This was the 19th season of second-tier college ice hockey.

After the 1981–82 season the majority of teams that registered as NAIA programs switched to NCAA. This meant that the representation at the Division II championship, specifically from western schools, was more equitable than in years past.

== Regular season ==
=== Season tournaments ===
Tournament	Dates	Teams	Champion
International Cup	November 4, 6	4	
RIT Tournament	November 5–6	4	Holy Cross
Charger Invitational		4	Connecticut
Merrimack Thanksgiving Tournament	November 26–27	4	Merrimack
Williams Invitational	November 26–27	4	Holy Cross
Cardinal Classic	December 3–4	4	Lowell
Codfish Bowl		4	Westfield State
Rensselaer Holiday Tournament	December 29–30	4	Rensselaer
Blue-Gold Tournament	January 1–2	4	RIT
Crusader Classic	January 4–5	4	Babson
Down East Classic	January 6–7	4	Lowell
Teapot Tournament	January 25, February 1	4	Lowell

=== Standings ===
1982–83 ECAC 2 standings
	Conference							Overall					
	GP	W	L	T	Pct.	GF	GA	GP	W	L	T	GF	GA
East Region
Lowell †*	18	18	0	0	1.000	115	45	31	29	2	0	186	83
Babson	20	15	4	1	.775	103	62	29	22	8	1	149	90
Holy Cross	24	16	7	1	.688	124	103	32	20	10	2	177	139
Salem State	25	14	8	3	.620	103	96	30	17	10	3		
Colby	19	11	8	0	.579	72	63						
New England College	23	13	10	0	.565	123	94	24	13	11	0		
Bowdoin	18	9	8	1	.528	78	74	25	11	13	1		
New Haven	21	10	10	1	.500	106	109						
Saint Anselm	20	9	11	0	.450	93	106	25	12	13	0	140	133
Connecticut	19	8	11	0	.421	97	95	24	10	14	0	122	112
Merrimack	15	10	15	0	.400	105	127	33	13	20	0	133	169
Massachusetts–Boston	16	4	12	0	.250	74	120	25	13	12	0	157	149
American International	20	5	15	0	.250	90	145	24	8	16	0		
West Region
RIT †	24	20	4	0	.833			32	23	9	0	191	106
Oswego State *	23	18	5	0	.783			33	24	8	1	235	142
Norwich	21	14	7	0	.667	120	82	27	17	10	0	138	92
Plattsburgh State	24	16	8	0	.667	115	103	32	19	12	1	147	131
Potsdam State	24	14	9	1	.604			28	15	12	1		
Elmira	25	14	11	0	.560			26	14	12	0	135	96
North Adams State	21	9	11	1	.452	101	101	26	12	13	1		
Union	20	8	10	2	.450	98	69	26	9	15	2		
Middlebury	17	7	9	1	.441	67	73	24	11	12	1	96	102
Geneseo State	23	8	15	0	.348			26	10	16	0		
Westfield State	16	5	10	1	.344	67	93	26	13	12	1		
Williams	20	6	14	0	.300	57	78	23	8	15	0		
Buffalo	22	6	15	1	.295			24	7	16	1		
Cortland State	20	5	14	1	.275								
Hamilton	19	5	14	0	.263	85	112	24	8	16	0		
Canisius	19	4	14	1	.237			26	9	16	1	99	133
Brockport State	24	4	20	0	.167			26	6	20	0	88	176
Championships: March 5, 1983 † indicates division regular season champion * indicates conference tournament champions

1982–83 NCAA Division II Independent ice hockey standings
	Overall record					
	GP	W	L	T	GF	GA
Alaska–Anchorage	28	20	7	1	152	99
Alaska–Fairbanks	26	19	7	0	149	96
Lake Forest	24	17	7	0	137	75
St. Scholastica	35	11	24	0		
Wisconsin–Stevens Point	19	1	18	0		

1982–83 Minnesota Intercollegiate Athletic Conference ice hockey standings
	Conference							Overall					
	GP	W	L	T	Pts	GF	GA	GP	W	L	T	GF	GA
St. Thomas †	16	14	2	0	28			28	19	9	0		
Augsburg	16	13	3	0	26			28	19	9	0		
Gustavus Adolphus	16	12	4	0	24			30	21	9	0		
St. Olaf	16	10	5	1	21			28	10	18	0		
Concordia (MN)	16	6	10	0	12			27	9	18	0		
Saint Mary's	16	5	10	1	11			27	9	17	1		
Saint John's	16	4	12	0	8			26	9	17	0		
Hamline	16	4	12	0	8								
Bethel	16	3	13	0	6			27	10	17	0		
† indicates conference regular season champion

1982–83 Northern Collegiate Hockey Association standings
	Conference							Overall					
	GP	W	L	T	Pts	GF	GA	GP	W	L	T	GF	GA
Bemidji State †	20	16	3	1	33	110	59	37	30	6	1	199	97
Mankato State	20	14	5	1	29	132	81	37	26	10	1	241	148
Wisconsin–River Falls	20	14	5	1	29	102	79	31	24	6	1	177	114
Wisconsin–Eau Claire	20	8	12	0	16	69	82	28	16	12	0	119	104
St. Cloud State	20	4	16	0	8	79	120	29	11	18	0	123	148
Wisconsin–Superior	20	2	17	1	5	61	132	31	9	21	1	126	175
† indicates conference regular season champion

1982–83 NYCHA standings
	Conference							Overall					
	GP	W	L	T	Pts	GF	GA	GP	W	L	T	GF	GA
RIT †	16	15	1	0	30	116	33	32	23	9	0	191	106
Oswego State	16	13	3	0	26	121	61	33	24	8	1	235	142
Potsdam State	16	10	5	1	.656			28	15	12	1		
Elmira	16	9	7	0	18	86	49	26	14	12	0	135	96
Geneseo State	16	7	9	0	.438			26	10	16	0		
Cortland State	16	5	10	1	.344								
Buffalo	16	5	10	1	.344			24	7	16	1		
Canisius	16	3	12	1	7	40	97	26	9	16	1	99	133
Brockport State	16	2	14	0	4	54	116	26	6	20	0	88	176
† indicates conference regular season champion

== 1983 NCAA Tournament ==
Quarterfinals; March 11–12
Babson	3	1	4
Norwich	1	2*	3
Bemidji State	6	2	8
Gustavus Adolphus	3	3	6
Lowell	10	5	15
Oswego State	2	3	5
RIT	6	3	9
Mankato State	1	6	7

Semifinals; March 17–18
Babson	1
Bemidji State	3
Lowell	1
RIT	4

National Championship; March 19
Bemidji State	2
RIT	4
Third place
Babson	3
Lowell	5

Note: * denotes overtime period(s)

== Drafted players ==
Round	Pick	Player	College	Conference	NHL team
6	116	Tom McComb ^{†}	Lowell	ECAC 2	Minnesota North Stars
7	123	Paul Ames ^{†}	Lowell	ECAC 2	Pittsburgh Penguins

† incoming freshman

== See also ==
- 1982–83 NCAA Division I men's ice hockey season
- 1982–83 NCAA Division III men's ice hockey season
