= 1983 NCAA Division II men's ice hockey tournament =

- Teams: 8
- Finals site: Tully Forum; North Billerica, Massachusetts
- Champions: RIT Tigers (1st title)
- Runner-up: Bemidji State Beavers (1st title game)
- Semifinalists: Lowell Chiefs (5th Frozen Four); Babson Beavers (1st Frozen Four)
- Winning coach: Brian Mason (1st title)
- MOP: Dave Burkholder (RIT)
- Attendance: 12,280

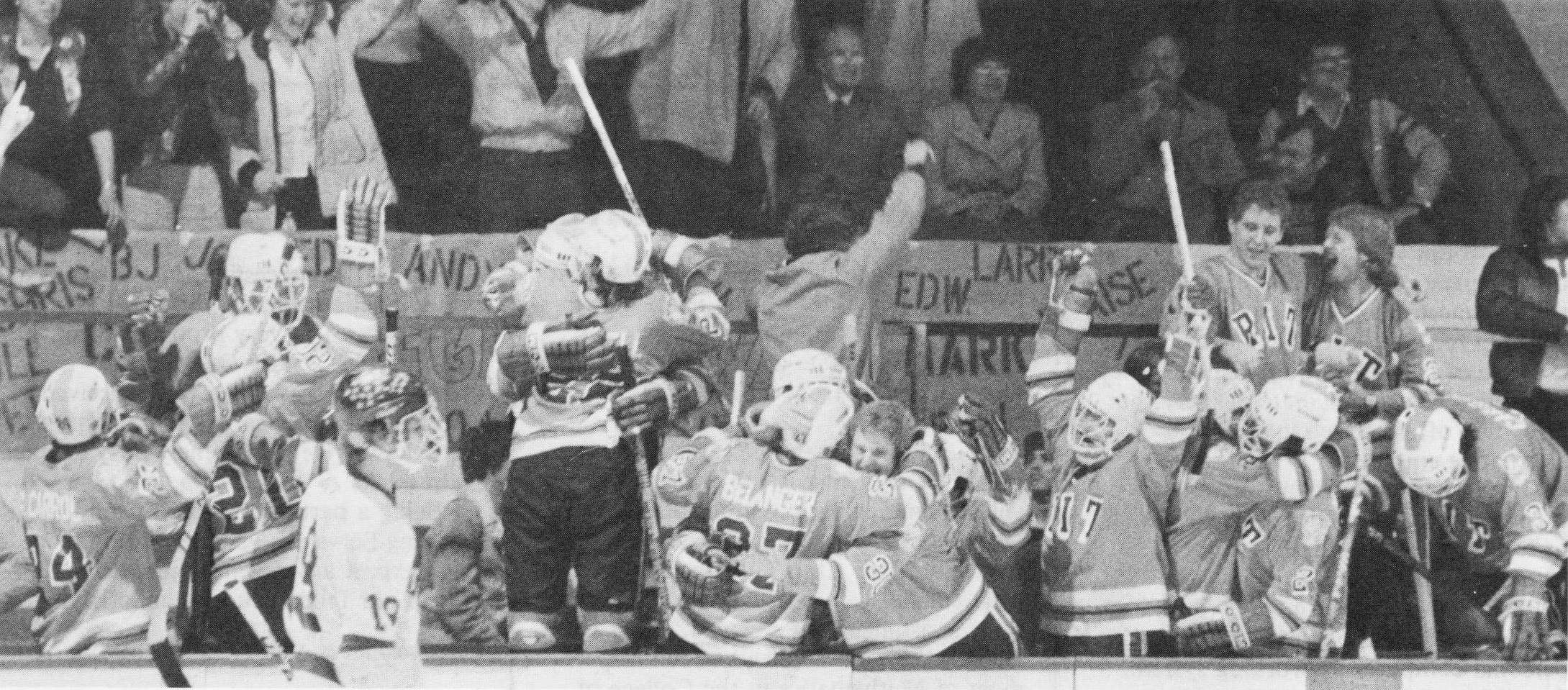
RIT's bench explodes in celebration during the final seconds of the championship game.

The 1983 NCAA Men's Division II Ice Hockey Tournament involved 8 schools playing in single-elimination play to determine the national champion of men's NCAA Division II college ice hockey. A total of 12 games were played, hosted by the University of Lowell.

RIT, coached by Brian Mason, won the national title with a 4–2 victory in the final game over Bemidji State.

Dave Burkholder, of RIT, was named the Most Outstanding Player and Mike Carr, of the University of Lowell, was the high scorer of the tournament with ten points (4 goals, 6 assists).

== Qualifying teams ==
After the majority of NAIA schools switched to the NCAA the number of western teams vying for a tournament berth ballooned and as a result the Western regional tournament was restarted. It is not considered as part of the NCAA tournament but is displayed here for reference.

=== Western Regional Tournament ===
Regional Quarterfinals
Bemidji State	5
St. Olaf	2
St. Thomas	5
Alaska	3
Gustavus Adolphus	6
Augsburg	5
Mankato State	11
Lake Forest	6

Regional semifinals
Bemidji State	3
St. Thomas	2
Gustavus Adolphus	2
Mankato State	5

Regional Final
Bemidji State	5
Mankato State	3

=== National Tournament Teams ===
East Region				West Region			
Seed	Team	Record	Last Bid	Seed	Team	Record	Last Bid
1	Lowell	26–1–0	1982	1	Bemidji State	28–4–1	Never
2	Babson	21–5–1	1982	2	Mankato State	25–9–1	1982
3	Norwich	16–9–0	Never	3	RIT	20–8–0	Never
4	Oswego State	24–6–1	1982	4	Gustavus Adolphus	20–8–0	1982

== Tournament bracket ==
The quarter-finals were two-game total-goals series played at the campus of the higher seed. The semi-finals and finals were single elimination games.

Quarterfinals; March 11–12
Babson	3	1	4
Norwich	1	2*	3
Bemidji State	6	2	8
Gustavus Adolphus	3	3	6
Lowell	10	5	15
Oswego State	2	3	5
Mankato State	1	6	7
RIT	6	3	9

Semifinals; March 17–18
Babson	1
Bemidji State	3
Lowell	1
RIT	4

National championship March 19
Bemidji State	2
RIT	4
Third place
Lowell	5
Babson	3

== All-Tournament team ==
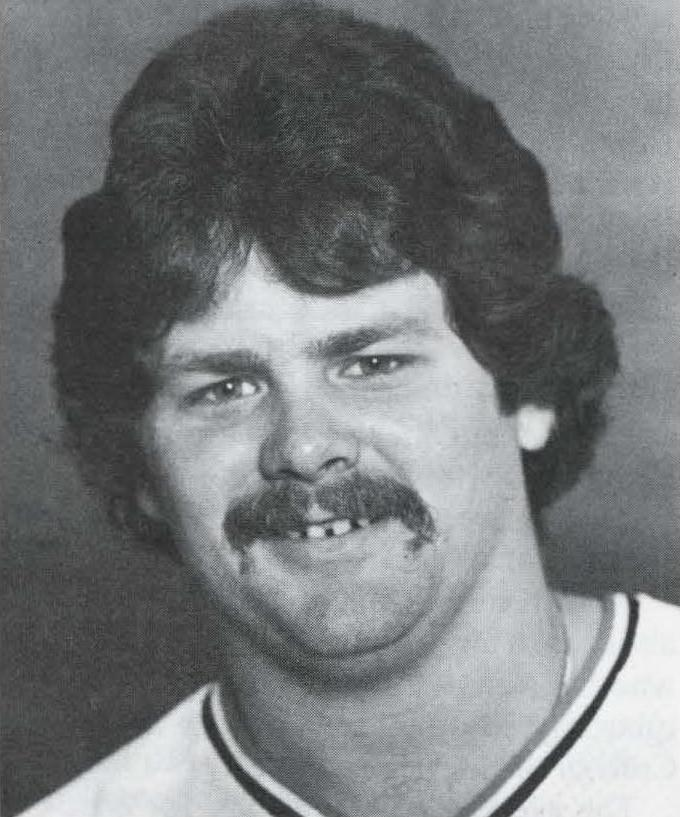
RIT's Dave Burkholder was named the tournament's Most Outstanding Player.

- G: Dave Burkholder (RIT)
- D: Mark Burgholzer (RIT)
- D: Tim Road (Bemidji State)
- F: Chris Johnstone (RIT)
- F: Chuck Samar (RIT)
- F: Paul Donato (Babson)
