= Western Intercollegiate Hockey Association Tournament =

Western Intercollegiate Hockey Association Tournament (defunct)
- Sport: College ice hockey
- Conference: Division II-III western teams
- Format: Various
- Played: 1975–81, 1983–85
- Last contest: 1985
- Current champion: Bemidji State (second title)
- Most championships: Minnesota State (four titles)

The Western Intercollegiate Hockey Association Tournament, also known as the WIHA Tournament, Western Regional, Divisional, or Championship Tournament was an end-of-season tournament for the Western teams playing NCAA Division II or Division III college ice hockey in the mid-1970s to mid-1980s. It originally started as a way for the Western teams to crown a champion, as they did not have a conference tournament to play in. Additionally, it helped the NCAA in selecting teams for their national tournament. After many of the Western teams joined the MIAC or NCHA, the Western tournament continued as neither of those conferences held a conference tournament at the time. After the 1985 season, the WIHA Tournament was made obsolete as both the MIAC and NCHA began sponsoring conference tournaments. As the participants in the WIHA Tournament did not have any conference tournament to play for, the WIHA Tournament effectively acted as a de facto conference tournament for the Western teams at that time, though it did not guarantee a bid into the National Championship Tournament.

== History ==
Prior to 1978, the NCAA did not hold a tournament to crown a national champion for Division II ice hockey. The majority of Division II hockey teams existed in the Eastern part of the United States, and many played in the ECAC 2. At the end of the season, the ECAC 2 held a conference tournament to choose a champion. Without access to the ECAC 2 tournament, the Western teams had no postseason tournament to play for. As such, a Western regional tournament was created to crown a champion in the Western region and give the teams something to play for at the end of the season, similar to how the ECAC 2 teams had the ECAC 2 Championship to play for. The first iteration of the tournament in 1975 featured only two teams: Mankato State and Chicago Circle. The teams played two games, with Mankato winning both games and winning the tournament. The following year, the tournament expanded to four teams in a single-elimination bracket. Mankato again won the championship, this time in a 5–2 win over Hamline. In 1977, the tournament contracted back to two teams, with St. Cloud State besting Mankato. At various times, the Western regional tournament was even referred to as the national championship, in lieu of an official one held by the NCAA.

In 1978, the NCAA began holding a Division II national championship for ice hockey. The Western teams still decided to keep the Western regional tournament to continue to give themselves something to play for at the end of the season as no Western team had a conference championship to play for. This was due to many of the Western teams being independent and the Western MIAC conference not sponsoring a conference tournament. Additionally, the Western teams hoped the Western regional tournament would help them showcase their teams and increase the odds the NCAA would select one of them for the national tournament. In 1978, the tournament expanded back to four teams, with Lake Forest besting Mankato State. The NCAA selected both of the Western regional tournament finalists for their national tournament. Lake Forest and Mankato State would go on to finish 2nd and 3rd respectively in the national tournament.

The 1979 tournament proved to be a strange one. After the first sudden-death overtime, Mankato State was tied with Chicago Circle 4–4. Given the opportunity to continue playing, the head coaches of both teams came together and jointly decided to end the game at a 4–4 tie with the thought that the NCAA would need to choose both teams for the national tournament if neither team won. Thus, both teams claimed joint shares of the Western Tournament Championship. This strategy proved to be successful, as both the Mavericks and Flames were chosen to the national tournament. Mankato State would go on to win the 1980 tournament over St. Scholastica for their fourth, and final, Western regional championship. Beginning in the 1980–81 season, several western teams formed a new conference, the NCHA. Additionally, many other western teams were members of the MIAC, and had been for several years up to that point. Despite most of the western teams no longer being independent, their conferences did not hold conference tournaments. As such, there was still a need to hold the Western regional tournament. The 1981 iteration once again featured four teams like the previous three years, though the teams opted not to play a championship game. Thus, both Gustavus Adolphus and Concordia (MN) were declared champions after their semifinal games.

In 1982, the national tournament expanded from four teams to eight teams, so the schools felt there was no need to hold a Western regional tournament. In the 1982–83 season, many formerly NAIA schools joined the NCAA, thus heavily increasing the amount of western teams. As such, there was once again a need for a Western regional tournament. The 1983 tournament expanded to eight teams to accommodate the new NAIA schools. Former NAIA team Bemidji State bested Mankato State in the championship.

Beginning in the 1983–84 season, many Division II hockey teams reclassified to Division III, including the NCHA and MIAC. Now in Division III, the NCHA and MIAC formed a partnership called the Western Intercollegiate Hockey Association (WIHA). As such, the Western regional tournament was renamed to the WIHA tournament, the first usage of this name. The 1984 WIHA tournament featured MIAC team St. Thomas beating Wisconsin–River Falls in the championship. The 1985 WIHA tournament would end up being the final tournament, with Bemidji State winning the last championship. Beginning in the 1985–86 season, the NCHA and MIAC began sponsoring conference tournaments, thus making the WIHA tournament obsolete.

== Team Performance ==
School	Championships	Appearances
Mankato State	4	9
Bemidji State	2	2
Gustavus Adolphus	1	5
St. Cloud State	1	5
Lake Forest	1	4
Chicago Circle	1	4
St. Thomas	1	3
Concordia (MN)	1	1
Hamline	0	3
Augsburg	0	2
St. Olaf	0	2
St. Scholastica	0	2
Wisconsin–River Falls	0	2
Alaska	0	1
Bethel	0	1
St. John's	0	1
St. Mary's	0	1

== Yearly Results ==
=== 1975 ===
Final
Mankato State	3	6
Chicago Circle	2	2

=== 1976 ===
Regional semifinals
Mankato State	5
St. John's	1
Hamline	5
Chicago Circle	3

Regional final
Mankato State	5
Hamline	2

=== 1977 ===
Final
St. Cloud State	4	5
Mankato State	4	4

=== 1978 ===
Regional semifinals
Mankato State	7
Chicago Circle	3
Lake Forest	5
St. Cloud State	1

Regional final
Mankato State	2
Lake Forest	5

=== 1979 ===
Regional semifinals
Mankato State	4
St. Cloud State	3
Chicago Circle	10
Hamline	4

Regional final
Mankato State	4
Chicago Circle	4

=== 1980 ===
Regional semifinals
Mankato State	5
Gustavus Adolphus	2
St. Scholastica	8
St. Cloud State	4

Regional final
Mankato State	14
St. Scholastica	6

=== 1981 ===
Regional Series
Gustavus Adolphus	2	6
Mankato State	3	4
Concordia (MN)	4	5
St. Cloud State	5	2

=== 1983 ===
Regional Quarterfinals
Bemidji State	5
St. Olaf	2
St. Thomas	5
Alaska	3
Gustavus Adolphus	6
Augsburg	5
Mankato State	11
Lake Forest	6

Regional semifinals
Bemidji State	3
St. Thomas	2
Gustavus Adolphus	2
Mankato State	5

Regional Final
Bemidji State	5
Mankato State	3

=== 1984 ===
Regional Quarterfinals
Augsburg	7	5
Lake Forest	4	1
Wisconsin–River Falls	6	11
St. Olaf	4	3
Hamline	5	5
Gustavus Adolphus	3	4
St. Thomas	5	5
Bethel	5	4

Regional semifinals
Augsburg	3
Wisconsin–River Falls	10
Hamline	2
St. Thomas	7

Regional Final
Wisconsin–River Falls	4
St. Thomas	5
Third place
Augsburg	10
Hamline	3

=== 1985 ===
Regional Quarterfinals
Bemidji State	5	5
St. Scholastica	5	1
Gustavus Adolphus	5	6
Saint Mary's	4	3
Mankato State	9	6
Wisconsin–River Falls	0	2
St. Thomas	6	3
Lake Forest	1	1

Regional semifinals
Bemidji State	4
Gustavus Adolphus	2
Mankato State	1
St. Thomas	4

Regional Final
Bemidji State	4
St. Thomas	1
Third place
Mankato State	6
Gustavus Adolphus	5
