= 1982 NCAA Division II men's ice hockey tournament =

- Teams: 8
- Finals site: Tully Forum, North Billerica, Massachusetts
- Champions: Lowell Chiefs (3rd title)
- Runner-up: Plattsburgh Cardinals (2nd title game)
- Semifinalists: Merrimack Warriors (3rd Frozen Four); Gustavus Adolphus Golden Gusties (1st Frozen Four)
- Winning coach: Bill Riley Jr. (3rd title)
- MOP: Paul Lohnes (Lowell)
- Attendance: 14,140

The 1982 NCAA Men's Division II Ice Hockey Tournament involved 8 schools playing in single-elimination play to determine the national champion of men's NCAA Division II college ice hockey. A total of 12 games were played, hosted by the University of Lowell.

The University of Lowell, coached by Bill Riley, won the national title with a 5–1 victory in the final game over Plattsburgh.

Paul Lohnes, of the University of Lowell, was named the Most Outstanding Player and Scott Swanson, of Gustavus Adolphus, was the high scorer of the tournament with eleven points (4 goals, 7 assists).

== Qualifying teams ==
With the number of teams in the tournament doubling, the NCAA did not hold a Western regional tournament. No automatic bids were offered.

East Region				West Region			
Seed	Team	Record	Last Bid	Seed	Team	Record	Last Bid
1	Lowell	28–3–0	1981	1	Mankato State	22–7–1	1981
2	Plattsburgh State	23–12–1	1981	2	Gustavus Adolphus	19–8–0	Never
3	Babson	20–6–1	Never	3	St. Scholastica	17–9–1	Never
4	Oswego State	20–8–0	Never	4	Merrimack	20–15–1	1980

== Tournament bracket ==
The quarter-finals were two-game total-goals series played at the campus of the higher seed. The semi-finals and finals were single elimination games.

Quarterfinals; March 12–14
Lowell	9	3	12
Oswego State	5	4	9
Merrimack	5	6	11
Mankato State	3	4	7
Plattsburgh State	4	1	5
Babson	3	1	4
Gustavus Adolphus	7	9	16
St. Scholastica	4	1	5

Semifinals; March 18–19
Lowell	4
Merrimack	3
Plattsburgh State	4
Gustavus Adolphus	3

National Championship; March 20
Lowell	6
Plattsburgh State	1
Third place
Merrimack	5
Gustavus Adolphus	8

== All-Tournament Team ==
- G: John MacKenzie (Lowell)
- D: Paul Lohnes (Lowell)
- D: Rob Spath (Lowell)
- F: Chip Grabowski (Plattsburgh State)
- F: Ken Kaiser (Lowell)
- F: Mike Carr (Lowell)
