= John S. Glas Field House =

American university ice hockey arena

John S. Glas Fieldhouse
- "The Glas"
- Interactive map of John S. Glas Fieldhouse
- Former names: BSU Fieldhouse (1967–75)
- Address: Bemidji; United States Of America
- Location: Bemidji State University; Bemidji, Minnesota, United States
- Coordinates: 47.486875°N 94.8771572°W
- Owner: Bemidji State University
- Operator: Bemidji State University
- Capacity: 2,399 (hockey)
- Surface: 200 ft × 85 ft (61 m × 26 m) (hockey)

Construction
- Groundbreaking: 1966; 60 years ago
- Opened: November 17, 1967; 58 years ago
- Cost: $970,000

Tenants
- Bemidji Wiffle Ball (2014–2017); Bemidji State Beavers men's ice hockey (1967–2010); Bemidji State Beavers women's ice hockey (2003–2010); Bemidji Axemen (2013–2015)

John S. Glas Fieldhouse was a 2,399-seat hockey rink in Bemidji, Minnesota, United States. It was home to the Bemidji State University Beavers men's and women's ice hockey teams until October 2010. The building, a part of a larger fieldhouse which contains the BSU Gymnasium and other athletic facilities, is now an artificial turf training area. It was opened on November 17, 1967, and was dedicated on February 10, 1968.

On October 1, 1975, the building was renamed in honor of John S. Glas, the acting president of the university at the time of the building of the arena. The Beaver ice hockey teams moved into the Sanford Center in October 2010.

The Fieldhouse is now the practice facility for many Bemidji State athletic programs including Baseball, Softball, and golf. Bemidji Wiffle Ball began playing their games in The Fieldhouse beginning in 2014, and it was also the practice facility for the Bemidji Axemen. The Wiffle team continued until Spring of 2017 when the Fieldhouse was renovated into grass turf. The facility now serves as a practice facility for BSU Sports.

Sporting positions
Preceded by 17th Street Outdoor Rink	Host of the Division III men's Frozen Four; 1986	Succeeded by Sanford Center
