= NCAA Division II independent schools (ice hockey) =

NCAA Division II independent schools are teams that compete in NCAA ice hockey but are not members of a conference. There are currently no independents at the Division II level, however, several teams were previously independents while under D-II classification.

== Current independent programs ==
As of 2022, only six teams play at the Division II level with all belonging to the same conference (Northeast-10 Conference).

== Current programs which were previously independent ==
The NCAA did not start numerical classification until 1973. Prior to that teams played either in the University Division, which became Division I, or the College Division, which was split into Divisions II and III. College Division independents are listed here for reference as a majority of the College Division programs joined the Division II level regardless of where their respective schools were reclassified.

During the 1960s and 70s most western schools competed in the NAIA and did not fall under the jurisdiction of the NCAA. This began to change once the NCAA instituted the Division II Tournament in 1978. In some cases NCAA teams were invited to participate in the NAIA tournament, leaving the ordering of schools at that time unclear.

=== Men ===
| School | Team | Location | Years | Subsequent conference(s) | Notes |
|---|---|---|---|---|---|
| Babson College | Beavers | Wellesley, Massachusetts | 1965–1967 | ECAC 2 | Currently plays in NEHC. |
| Bentley College | Falcons | Waltham, Massachusetts | 1998–1999 | MAAC | Played one season at the Division II level before raising to Division I. Currently plays in the MAAC's successor conference, Atlantic Hockey America. |
| Elmira College | Soaring Eagles | Elmira, New York | 1974–1976 | ECAC 2 | Currently plays in UCHC. |
| Lake Forest College | Foresters | Lake Forest, Illinois | 1965–1984 | Division III | Remained an independent at the D-III level. Currently plays in the NCHA. |
| Lowell Tech | Terriers | Lowell, Massachusetts | 1967–1968 | ECAC 2 | Raised to Division I in 1983. Became University of Massachusetts Lowell in 1993. Currently plays in Hockey East. |
| Mankato State University | Mavericks | Mankato, Minnesota | 1969–1980; 1992–1996 | NCHA; Division I | Left NCHA in 1992 to compete fully at the Division II level. Program was raised to D-I four years later due to the lack of interest from other D-II schools. Became Minnesota State University in 2000. |
| New England College | Pilgrims | Henniker, New Hampshire | 1969–1971 | ECAC 2 | Currently plays in NEHC. |
| Nichols College | Bison | Dudley, Massachusetts | 1964–1966^{†} | ECAC 2 | Currently plays in CNE. |
| North Adams State College | Mohawks | North Adams, Massachusetts | 1971–1972; 1974–1975 | ECAC 3 ECAC 2 | School changed name to Massachusetts College of Liberal Arts before dropping ice hockey in 2003. The program was restarted in 2023. |
| Plymouth State College | Panthers | Plymouth, New Hampshire | 1971–1973 | ECAC 3 | |
| Post University | Eagles | Waterbury, Connecticut | 2016–2019 | Northeast-10 | |
| Salem State College | Vikings | Salem, Massachusetts | 1964–1967^{†} | ECAC 2 | Currently plays in MASCAC. |
| St. Cloud State University | Huskies | St. Cloud, Minnesota | 1964–1980^{†} | NCHA | Program was promoted to Division I in 1987. Currently plays in the NCHC. |
| St. Olaf College | Oles | Northfield, Minnesota | 1950–1974^{†} | MIAC | School left the MIAC in 1950 and returned in 1974. |
| The College at Brockport, State University of New York | Golden Eagles | Brockport, New York | 1973–1976 | ECAC 2 | Founded ice hockey division of SUNYAC in 1992. |
| State University of New York at Geneseo | Knights | Geneseo, New York | 1975–1976 | ECAC 2 | Founded ice hockey division of SUNYAC in 1992. |
| State University of New York at Plattsburgh | Cardinals | Plattsburgh, New York | 1975–1976 | ECAC 2 | Founded ice hockey division of SUNYAC in 1992. |
| University of Wisconsin–Stevens Point | Pointers | Stevens Point, Wisconsin | 1981–1984 | Division III | Remained an independent at the D-III level. Currently plays in the WIAC. |

† played as an independent prior to the formal creation of lower-tier ice hockey in 1964.

== Defunct teams ==
=== Men ===
| School | Team | Location | Years | Subsequent conference(s) | Notes |
|---|---|---|---|---|---|
| University of Alabama in Huntsville | Chargers | Huntsville, Alabama | 1986–1987; 1992–1998 | Division I Division I | Played one season at the Division II level after transferring from NAIA before raising to the D-I level. Returned to D-II when the national tournament was restarted and left in preparation to join a D-I conference (CHA). Program was suspended in 2021 due to scheduling difficulties with the expectation to return once conference membership could be secured. |
| Boston State College | Warriors | Boston, Massachusetts | 1964–1966^{†} | ECAC 2 | Merged with University of Massachusetts Boston in 1982. |
| University of Buffalo | Bulls | Buffalo, New York | 1969–1971 | ECAC 2 | Suspended program in 1987. |
| University of Findlay | Oilers | Findlay, Ohio | 1996–1998 | MCHA | Joined Division I CHA after one year in the MCHA. Program was suspended in 2004. |
| University of Minnesota Crookston | Golden Eagles | Crookston, Minnesota | 1998–1999 | MCHA | Was forced to leave the MCHA in 2009 due to NCAA regulations barring higher-tier teams from participating in Division III conferences. Suspended program when no other nearby Division II schools were willing to start ice hockey programs. |

† played as an independent prior to the formal creation of lower-tier ice hockey in 1964.

== See also ==
- List of NCAA Division II ice hockey programs
- NCAA Division II independent schools
- NCAA Division I independent schools (ice hockey)
