= List of Bemidji State Beavers men's ice hockey seasons =

This is a season-by-season list of records compiled by Bemidji State in men's ice hockey.

Bemidji State has won 13 national titles at varying levels of play, appearing in 20 championship rounds (including 8 consecutive Division II championships) but has yet to win at the Division I level (as of 2019).

== Season-by-season results ==
Note: GP = Games played, W = Wins, L = Losses, T = Ties

NAIA/NCAA Champions	NAIA/NCAA Frozen Four	Conference regular season champions	Conference Playoff Champions

Season	Conference	Regular Season (Note: Code explanation; GP—Games Played, W—Wins, L—Losses, T—Tied games, OTW—Overtime Wins, OTL—Overtime Loses, 3/SW—Win in 3 on 3 overtime or shootout, Pts—Points*)														Conference Tournament Results	National Tournament Results
Season	Conference	Conference									Overall					Conference Tournament Results	National Tournament Results
Season	Conference	GP	W	L	T	OTW	OTL	3/SW	Pts*	Finish	GP	W	L	T	%	Conference Tournament Results	National Tournament Results
Jack Aldrich (1947–1948)
1947–48	Independent	–	–	–	–	–	–	–	–	–	10	2	8	0	.200		
Eric Hughes (1948–1950)
1948–49	Independent	–	–	–	–	–	–	–	–	–	15	9	6	0	.600		
1949–50	Independent	–	–	–	–	–	–	–	–	–	15	8	7	0	.533		
Program Suspended Due to Arena Roof Collapse
Vic Weber (1959–1964)
1959–60	Independent	–	–	–	–	–	–	–	–	–	4	2	2	0	.500		
1960–61	Independent	–	–	–	–	–	–	–	–	–	10	6	4	0	.600		
1961–62	Independent	–	–	–	–	–	–	–	–	–	12	8	4	0	.667		
1962–63	Independent	–	–	–	–	–	–	–	–	–	12	6	5	1	.542		
1963–64	Independent	–	–	–	–	–	–	–	–	–	12	8	3	1	.708		
College Division
Wayne Peterson (1964–1965)
1964–65	Independent	–	–	–	–	–	–	–	–	–	12	10	1	1	.875		
Vic Weber (1965–1966)
1965–66	Independent	–	–	–	–	–	–	–	–	–	13	12	1	0	.923		
NAIA
Bob Peters (1966–1982)
1966–67	ICHA	12	10	2	0	–	–	–	.833	T–1st	19	13	5	1	.711		
1967–68	ICHA	12	6	6	0	–	–	–	.500	–	24	16	8	0	.667		Won Semifinal, 11–0 (Boston State); Won Championship, 5–4 (OT) (Lake Superior State)
1968–69	ICHA	12	11	1	0	–	–	–	.917	1st	25	23	2	0	.920		Won Semifinal, 14–2 (Salem State); Won Championship, 6–2 (Lake Superior State)
1969–70	ICHA	12	10	2	0	–	–	–	.833	1st	27	24	3	0	.889		Won Semifinal, 14–2 (Gustavus Adolphus); Won Championship, 7–4 (Lake Superior State)
1970–71	ICHA	12	10	1	1	–	–	–	.875	1st	28	20	7	1	.732		Won Semifinal, 12–1 (Augsburg); Won Championship, 6–2 (Lakehead)
1971–72	ICHA	12	5	6	1	–	–	–	.458	–	26	13	12	1	.519		
1972–73	ICHA	12	8	4	0	–	–	–	.667	T–1st	30	23	6	1	.783		Won Semifinal, 6–3 (Gustavus Adolphus); Won Championship, 3–2 (OT) (Lakehead)
1973–74	ICHA	12	9	3	0	–	–	–	.750	1st	31	20	10	1	.661		Won Semifinal, 4–2 (Gustavus Adolphus); Lost Championship, 1–4 (Lake Superior State)
1974–75	ICHA	12	2	10	0	–	–	–	.167	–	28	13	15	0	.464		
1975–76	ICHA	12	8	4	0	–	–	–	.667	–	31	22	9	0	.710		Won Quarterfinal, 4–2 (Wisconsin–Stout); Lost Semifinal, 3–4 (Wisconsin–Superior); Lost Third-place game, 4–5 (Gustavus Adolphus)
1976–77	ICHA	14	9	3	2	–	–	–	.714	1st	31	24	4	3	.823		Won Quarterfinal, 11–0 (St. Francis); Lost Semifinal, 2–5 (St. Scholastica); Won Third-place game, 4–5 (Augsburg)
1977–78	ICHA	14	11	3	0	–	–	–	.786	1st	31	25	5	1	.823		Won Quarterfinal, 16–2 (St. Francis); Won Semifinal, 7–1 (St. Thomas); Lost Championship, 3–4 (Augsburg)
1978–79	Independent	–	–	–	–	–	–	–	–	–	29	27	2	0	.931		Won Quarterfinal, 17–1 (St. Francis); Won Semifinal, 7–5 (Wisconsin-River Falls); Won Championship, 5–1 (Concordia)
1979–80	Independent	–	–	–	–	–	–	–	–	–	32	24	8	0	.750		Won Quarterfinal, 5–2 (St. Olaf); Won Semifinal, 8–3 (Wisconsin-Superior); Won Championship, 4–3 (Michigan–Dearborn)
1980–81	NCHA	12	8	4	0	–	–	–	.667	2nd	31	24	7	0	.774		Won Quarterfinal, 5–1 (St. Mary’s); Lost Semifinal, 4–6 (Wisconsin-Superior); Won Third-place game, 11–2 (Michigan–Dearborn)
1981–82	NCHA	20	16	3	1	–	–	–	.825	1st	31	25	5	1	.823		Won Quarterfinal, 6–2 (Hamline); Won Semifinal, 7–0 (Wisconsin-River Falls); Lost Championship, 11–2 (Augsburg)
NCAA Division II
Mike Gibbons (1982–1983)
1982–83	NCHA	20	16	3	1	–	–	–	33	1st	37	30	6	1	.824	Won WIHA Quarterfinal, 5–2 (St. Olaf); Won WIHA Semifinal, 3–2 (St. Thomas); Won WIHA Championship, 5–3 (Mankato State)	Won Quarterfinal series, 8–6 (Gustavus Adolphus); Won Semifinal, 3–1 (Babson); Lost Championship, 2–4 (RIT)
Bob Peters (1983–2001)
1983–84	NCHA	18	18	0	0	–	–	–	36	1st	31	31	0	0	1.000		Won Semifinal series, 13–8 (Alaska–Fairbanks); Won Championship series, 14–4 (Merrimack)
NCAA Division III
1984–85	NCHA	18	14	3	1	–	–	–	29	1st	35	27	6	2	.800	Won WIHA Semifinal series, 10–6 (St. Scholastica); Won WIHA Championship, 4–2 (Gustavus Adolphus)	Won Quarterfinal series, 11–6 (Mankato State); Won Semifinal, 8–7 (3OT) (Plattsburgh State); Lost Championship, 1–5 (RIT)
1985–86	NCHA	18	12	6	0	–	–	–	24	T–1st	35	25	9	1	.729	Won Semifinal series, 8–7 (Wisconsin-River Falls); Won Championship series, 10–9 (Mankato State)	Won Quarterfinal series, 2–1 (Elmira); Won Semifinal, 5–4 (OT) (RIT); Won Championship, 8–5 (Plattsburgh State)
1986–87	NCHA	20	12	7	1	–	–	–	25	3rd	35	22	12	1	.643	Won Semifinal series, 2–0 (Mankato State); Lost Championship series, 0–2 (St. Cloud State)	Won Quarterfinal series, 2–0 (Concordia); Lost Semifinal, 4–7 (Plattsburgh State); Lost Third-place game, 4–6 (St. Cloud State)
1987–88	NCHA	24	15	6	3	–	–	–	33	2nd	38	24	11	3	.671	Won Semifinal series, 2–1 (Wisconsin–Stevens Point); Lost Championship series, 0–2 (Wisconsin-River Falls)	Won Quarterfinal series, 2–0 (St. Thomas); Lost Semifinal series, 0–2 (Wisconsin-River Falls)
1988–89	NCHA	20	11	8	1	–	–	–	26	3rd	36	19	13	4	.583	Won Semifinal series, 1–0–1 (Wisconsin–Eau Claire); Lost Championship series, 0–1–1 (Wisconsin–Stevens Point)	Won Quarterfinal series, 2–0 (St. Mary’s); Lost Semifinal series, 0–2 (Wisconsin–Stevens Point)
1989–90	NCHA	24	11	11	2	–	–	–	24	5th	28	15	11	2	.571		
1990–91	NCHA	24	17	4	3	–	–	–	37	T–1st	30	21	6	3	.354	Lost Semifinal series, 0–2 (Wisconsin–Stevens Point)	
1991–92	NCHA	20	9	8	3	–	–	–	21	4th	30	16	9	5	.617	Lost Semifinal series, 4–10 (Wisconsin–Stevens Point)	
NCAA Division II
1992–93	NCHA	20	14	6	0	–	–	–	28	2nd	31	24	7	0	.774	Won Semifinal series, 14–3 (Wisconsin-River Falls); Lost Championship series, 9–10 (Wisconsin–Stevens Point)	Won Championship series, 2–0 (Mercyhurst)
1993–94	NCHA	20	12	6	2	–	–	–	26	3rd	33	21	9	3	.682	Won Quarterfinal series, 2–0 (Lake Forest); Won Semifinal series, 1–0–1 (Wisconsin–Stevens Point); Lost Championship series, 1–2 (Wisconsin–Superior)	Won Championship series, 2–1 (Alabama–Huntsville)
1994–95	NCHA	20	16	3	1	–	–	–	33	1st	33	24	7	2	.758	Won Quarterfinal series, 2–0 (St. Scholastica); Won Semifinal series, 2–1 (Wisconsin-River Falls); Won Championship, 4–2 (Wisconsin–Stevens Point)	Won Championship series, 2–0 (Mercyhurst)
1995–96	NCHA	20	13	5	2	–	–	–	28	2nd	29	16	9	4	.621	Lost Semifinal series, 2–0 (Wisconsin–Superior)	Lost Championship series, 0–2 (Alabama–Huntsville)
1996–97	NCHA	20	14	5	1	–	–	–	29	T–2nd	34	25	7	2	.765	†	Won Championship series, 2–0 (Alabama–Huntsville)
1997–98	NCHA	20	14	6	0	–	–	–	28	T–3rd	34	22	10	2	.676	†	Lost Championship series, 0–2 (Alabama–Huntsville)
1998–99	NCHA	16	10	6	0	–	–	–	20	T–3rd	30	17	13	0	.567	†	
NCAA Division I
1999–00	CHA	17	8	8	1	–	–	–	17	3rd	34	13	20	1	.397	Lost Semifinal, 4–10 (Alabama–Huntsville)	
2000–01	CHA	19	4	12	3	–	–	–	11	6th	34	4	26	4	.176		
Tom Serratore (2001–Present)
2001–02	CHA	19	8	7	4	–	–	–	22	2nd	35	12	18	5	.414	Lost Semifinal, 2–5 (Alabama–Huntsville)	
2002–03	CHA	20	10	6	4	–	–	–	24	T–3rd	36	14	14	8	.500	Won Quarterfinal, 4–0 (Findlay); Won Semifinal, 2–1 (OT) (Alabama–Huntsville); Lost Championship, 2–3 (Wayne State)	
2003–04	CHA	20	16	3	1	–	–	–	33	1st	36	20	13	3	.597	Won Semifinal, 6–2 (Findlay); Lost Championship, 3–4 (OT) (Niagara)	
2004–05	CHA	20	16	4	0	–	–	–	32	1st	37	23	13	1	.635	Won Semifinal, 6–0 (Air Force); Won Championship, 3–0 (Alabama–Huntsville)	Lost Regional semifinal, 3–4 (OT) (Denver)
2005–06	CHA	20	12	7	1	–	–	–	25	T–2nd	37	20	14	3	.581	Won Semifinal, 4–3 (OT) (Alabama–Huntsville); Won Championship, 4–2 (Niagara)	Lost Regional semifinal, 0–4 (Wisconsin)
2006–07	CHA	20	9	6	5	–	–	–	23	2nd	33	14	14	5	.500	Lost Semifinal, 5–7 (Robert Morris)	
2007–08	CHA	20	13	4	3	–	–	–	29	1st	36	17	16	3	.514	Won Semifinal, 4–1 (Wayne State); Lost Championship, 2–3 (Niagara)	
2008–09	CHA	18	12	5	1	–	–	–	25	1st	37	20	16	1	.554	Won Semifinal, 4–1 (Alabama–Huntsville); Won Championship, 3–2 (OT) (Robert Morris)	Won Regional semifinal, 5–1 (Notre Dame); Won Regional Final, 4–1 (Cornell); Lost National semifinal, 1–4 (Miami)
2009–10	CHA	18	14	3	1	–	–	–	29	1st	37	23	10	4	.676	Lost Semifinal, 4–5 (Niagara)	Lost Regional semifinal, 1–5 (Michigan)
2010–11	WCHA	28	8	15	5	–	–	–	21	10th	38	15	18	5	.158	Won First round series, 2–0 (Nebraska–Omaha); Won Quarterfinal, 3–2 (OT) (Minnesota–Duluth); Lost Semifinal, 2–6 (Denver)	
2011–12	WCHA	28	11	14	3	–	–	–	25	9th	38	17	18	3	.487	Lost First round series, 0–2 (North Dakota)	
2012–13	WCHA	28	5	16	7	–	–	–	17	11th	36	6	22	8	.278	Lost First round series, 0–2 (Minnesota)	
2013–14	WCHA	28	10	14	4	–	–	–	24	T–8th	38	10	21	7	.355	Lost First round series, 0–2 (Ferris State)	
2014–15	WCHA	28	12	11	5	–	–	–	29	5th	38	16	17	5	.487	Lost First round series, 0–2 (Ferris State)	
2015–16	WCHA	28	11	12	5	–	–	–	27	6th	39	17	16	6	.513	Lost First round series, 1–2 (Bowling Green)	
2016–17	WCHA	28	20	6	2	–	–	2	64	1st	41	22	16	3	.573	Won First round series, 2–1 (Northern Michigan); Lost Semifinal series, 0–2 (Bowling Green)	
2017–18	WCHA	28	13	9	6	–	–	4	49	4th	38	16	14	8	.526	Lost First round series, 0–2 (Michigan Tech)	
2018–19	WCHA	28	13	11	4	–	–	2	45	5th	38	15	17	6	.474	Lost First round series, 0–2 (Lake Superior State)	
2019–20	WCHA	28	20	5	3	–	–	2	65	2nd	37	22	10	5	.662	Won First round series, 2–1 (Lake Superior State); Tournament Cancelled	
2020–21	WCHA	14	8	5	1	3	2	0	24	4th	29	16	10	3	.603	Won Quarterfinal series, 2–0 (Michigan Tech); Lost Semifinal, 1–4 (Lake Superior State)	Won Regional semifinal, 6–3 (Wisconsin); Lost Regional Final, 0–4 (Massachusetts)
2021–22	CCHA	26	14	12	0	1	1	0	42	3rd	39	19	20	0	.487	Won Quarterfinal series, 2–1 (Bowling Green); Won Semifinal, 5–2 (Michigan Tech); Lost Championship, 1–2 (OT) (Minnesota State)	
2022–23	CCHA	26	12	11	3	3	1	2	39	T–4th	36	14	17	5	.458	Lost Quarterfinal series, 0–2 (Northern Michigan)	
2023–24	CCHA	24	15	7	2	2	1	2	48	1st	38	20	16	2	.553	Won Quarterfinal series, 2–0 (Ferris State); Won Semifinal, 4–1 (Lake Superior State); Lost Championship, 1–2 (Michigan Tech)	
2024–25	CCHA	26	10	14	2	3	1	4	.462	T–6th	38	15	18	5	.461	Won Quarterfinal series, 2–1 (Augustana); Lost Semifinal, 0–4 (Minnesota State)	
2025–26	CCHA	26	11	11	4	5	1	3	36	6th	36	13	19	4	.417	Lost Quarterfinal series, 0–2 (Augustana)	
Totals											GP	W	L	T	%	Championships	
Regular Season											1935	1111	659	155	.617	8 ICHA Championships, 7 NCHA Championships, 5 CHA Championships, 1 WCHA Championship, 1 CCHA Championship	
Conference Post-season											109	53	50	6	.514	2 WIHA tournament championships, 2 NCHA tournament championships, 3 CHA tournament championships	
NAIA/NCAA Post-season											83	55	28	0	.663	13 NAIA Tournament appearances, 5 NCAA Division III Tournament appearances, 8 NCAA Division II Tournament appearances, 4 NCAA Division I Tournament appearances,	
Regular Season and Post-season Record											2117	1219	737	161	.614	7 NAIA national championships 1 NCAA Division III National Championships, 5 NCAA Division II National Championships	

* Winning percentage is used when conference schedules are unbalanced.
† Bemidji State was not allowed to participate in the NCHA Tournament after 1996 due to being a Division II program.
