= Don Roberts (ice hockey) =

American ice hockey coach (1933–2016)

Biographical details
- Born: May 27, 1933
- Died: July 24, 2016 (aged 83)

Coaching career (HC unless noted)
- 1964–1997: Gustavus Adolphus

Head coaching record
- Overall: 532–290–25 (.643)

Accomplishments and honors

Awards
- 1976 Edward Jeremiah Award

Donald Roberts (May 27, 1933 – July 24, 2016) was an American college men's ice hockey coach. From 1964 to 1997, he was the head hockey coach at Gustavus Adolphus College in St. Peter, Minnesota. At the time of his retirement in 1996, he was the winningest hockey coach in NCAA Division III history. He received the John MacInnes Award from the American Hockey Coaches Association in 1993 and the Hobey Baker Legends of College Hockey Award in 2009. As of 2010, he ranks 15th all-time among college men's ice hockey coaches with 532 wins.

== Early years ==
Roberts grew up in Appleton, Minnesota, where he was a star basketball player. He enrolled at Gustavus Adolphus College in the early 1950s and played four years at halfback and fullback on the school's varsity football team under Coach Lloyd Hollingsworth. He played on three Minnesota Intercollegiate Athletic Conference championship football teams and was selected as an All-MIAC fullback in 1955. He also played basketball and baseball, but not hockey, while he was a student at Gustavus.

After college, Roberts served for three-and-a-half years in the United States Marine Corps, reaching the rank of captain. While stationed at Camp Pendleton in California, Roberts began coaching baseball and football. Roberts later recalled, "There is no greater place to learn about leadership than in the Corps."

In 1959, Roberts was offered a position as a teacher and coach at Gustavus. He returned to Gustavus in the fall of 1959 and became the school's wrestling coach. After the 1960 football season, Lloyd Hollingsworth resigned, and Roberts was appointed as the new head football coach. He stepped down as the school's wrestling coach in 1962 to focus on the football program. He was the head football coach at Gustavus for five seasons from 1961 to 1965.

== Gustavus hockey coach ==
In 1964, several schools in the Minnesota Intercollegiate Athletic Conference ("MIAC") decided to add hockey to the conference's sports programs. Though he had never played or coached hockey before in his life, Roberts was appointed as the school's hockey coach. He later recalled, "I didn't have a winter sport, so I was the new hockey coach. The story was that I couldn't skate. Actually, I had skated occasionally on the Pomme de Terre River growing up in Appleton. We played some shinny hockey, using a pop can as a puck." He also recalled the teasing he received about his unsteadiness on ice skates: "On skates, I was a 30-year-old mite. I would stumble a lot. I started coaching in boots. The players would laugh at me. I was a good handball player. If someone laughed too hard, he had to play me in handball."

In an effort to learn the basics of the sport, Roberts bought a book by Dartmouth College coach Eddie Jeremiah. Thirty years later, he said of Jeremiah's book, "It's still the best teaching manual ever about hockey."

In Roberts' first year as a hockey coach, the 1965 team finished with a record of 1-14. However, Roberts compiled a 16-2 record and won an MIAC championship in 1966. From 1966 to 1978, Roberts' hockey teams compiled a record of 235-64-1 and won 12 of 13 MIAC conference championships.

Roberts also served as the chairman and president of the American Hockey Coaches Association and was a member of the NCAA Rules and Hockey Advisory Committees for many years.

== Career record and honors ==
In 33 years as the head coach at Gustavus, Roberts compiled a record of 532 wins, 290 losses and 25 ties. At the time of his retirement in 1996, he ranked first in career wins in NCAA Division III history. As of 2010, he ranks 16th all-time among college men's ice hockey coaches with 532 wins. Roberts has been the recipient of many awards for his accomplishments and contributions to college hockey. His awards include the following:

- In 1975, Roberts was selected as the national hockey Coach of the Year by both the American Hockey Coaches Association and National Association of Intercollegiate Athletics.
- Roberts was named MIAC Coach of the Year seven times (1973, 1975, 1976, 1984, 1990, 1991, and 1993).
- In 1985, he was inducted into the Gustavus Adolphus Athlete Hall of Fame for his contributions as an athlete in football, baseball and basketball.
- In 1993, the American Hockey Coaches Association awarded the John MacInnes Award to Roberts for his lifetime of contributions to amateur hockey.
- In 2009, he received the Hobey Baker Legends of College Hockey Award as one of the all-time greats in the history of college hockey.
- The rink at which Gustavus Adolphus currently plays its hockey games has been named the Don Roberts Ice Rink in honor of Roberts.

== Personal life ==
Roberts lived with his wife, Nancy Roberts, in St. Peter, Minnesota. They had four children, two of whom played football for Gustavus. Don died at the age of 83 on July 24, 2016.

== Head coaching record ==
Record table
Season	Team	Overall	Conference	Standing	Postseason
Gustavus Adolphus Golden Gusties (MIAC) (1965–1997)
1964–65	Gustavus Adolphus	1–14–0	0–14–0	8th	
1965–66	Gustavus Adolphus	16–2–0	12–2–0	1st	
1966–67	Gustavus Adolphus	16–4–0	12–2–0	1st	
1967–68	Gustavus Adolphus	14–7–0	12–2–0	1st	NAIA third-place game (win)
1968–69	Gustavus Adolphus	17–4–1	13–1–0	1st	NAIA third-place game (win)
1969–70	Gustavus Adolphus	21–2–0	14–0–0	1st	NAIA third-place game (win)
1970–71	Gustavus Adolphus	15–6–0	12–1–0	1st	NAIA third-place game (loss)
1971–72	Gustavus Adolphus	16–5–0	12–2–0	1st	NAIA runner-up
1972–73	Gustavus Adolphus	18–6–0	14–0–0	1st	NAIA third-place game (loss)
1973–74	Gustavus Adolphus	20–5–0	12–2–0	2nd	NAIA third-place game (win)
1974–75	Gustavus Adolphus	23–4–0	15–1–0	1st	NAIA runner-up
1975–76	Gustavus Adolphus	23–4–0	13–1–0	1st	NAIA third-place game (win)
1976–77	Gustavus Adolphus	19–4–1	12–2–0	T–1st	NAIA runner-up
1977–78	Gustavus Adolphus	17–11–0	11–3–0	2nd	NAIA Quarterfinals
1978–79	Gustavus Adolphus	14–14–0	9–5–0	T–2nd	NAIA Quarterfinals
1979–80	Gustavus Adolphus	15–11–0	10–6–0	4th	
1980–81	Gustavus Adolphus	18–8–0	11–5–0	3rd	
1981–82	Gustavus Adolphus	22–9–0	13–3–0	2nd	
1982–83	Gustavus Adolphus	21–9–0	12–4–0	3rd	NCAA Quarterfinals
1983–84	Gustavus Adolphus	16–12–1	13–2–1	1st	WIHA Quarterfinals
1984–85	Gustavus Adolphus	16–13–1	11–5–0	T–2nd	WIHA Semifinals
1985–86	Gustavus Adolphus	12–15–2	8–8–0	4th	MIAC Semifinals
1986–87	Gustavus Adolphus	9–18–0	6–10–0	T–7th	
1987–88	Gustavus Adolphus	13–14–0	11–7–0	3rd	MIAC Semifinals
1988–89	Gustavus Adolphus	13–15–1	10–6–0	3rd	MIAC Semifinals
1989–90	Gustavus Adolphus	20–6–5	11–3–2	2nd	NCAA Quarterfinals
1990–91	Gustavus Adolphus	17–6–3	11–3–2	2nd	NCAA Quarterfinals
1991–92	Gustavus Adolphus	16–9–3	10–3–3	3rd	MIAC Runner-Up
1992–93	Gustavus Adolphus	22–6–1	13–2–1	1st	NCAA Quarterfinals
1993–94	Gustavus Adolphus	7–14–4	5–8–3	7th	
1994–95	Gustavus Adolphus	12–13–1	11–4–1	T–2nd	MIAC Semifinals
1995–96	Gustavus Adolphus	16–8–1	12–3–1	2nd	MIAC Semifinals
1996–97	Gustavus Adolphus	17–12–0	11–5–0	3rd	MIAC Runner-Up
Gustavus Adolphus:		532–290–25	362–125–14		
Total:		532–290–25			
National champion Postseason invitational champion Conference regular season champion Conference regular season and conference tournament champion Division regular season champion Division regular season and conference tournament champion Conference tournament champion

== See also ==
- List of college men's ice hockey coaches with 400 wins

Awards and achievements
Preceded by Wendall Forbes	Edward Jeremiah Award; 1975–76	Succeeded by Bill Riley Jr.
Preceded by Eddie Jeremiah	Hobey Baker Legends of College Hockey Award; 2009	Succeeded by Charlie Holt
