= List of Lake Superior State Lakers men's ice hockey seasons =

This is a list of seasons completed by the Lake Superior State University Lakers men's ice hockey team.

Lake Superior State has won three NCAA Championships and two NAIA Championships in its history.

NAIA/NCAA D-I Champions	NAIA/NCAA Frozen Four	Conference regular season champions	Conference Playoff Champions

Season	Conference	Regular season (Note: Code explanation; GP—Games Played, W—Wins, L—Losses, T—Tied games, OTW—Overtime Wins, OTL—Overtime Loses, 3/SW—Win in 3 on 3 overtime or shootout, Pts—Points*)														Conference Tournament Results	National Tournament Results
Season	Conference	Conference									Overall					Conference Tournament Results	National Tournament Results
Season	Conference	GP	W	L	T	OTW	OTL	3/SW	Pts*	Finish	GP	W	L	T	%	Conference Tournament Results	National Tournament Results
NAIA
Ron Mason (1966 — 1973)
1966–67	Independent	–	–	–	–	–	–	–	–	–	20	15	5	0	.750		
1967–68	ICHA	16	15	1	0	–	–	–	.938	1st	26	21	3	2	.846		Won NAIA Semifinal, 7–1 (Gustavus Adolphus); Lost NAIA Championship, 5–4 (OT) (Bemidji State)
1968–69	ICHA	16	12	4	0	–	–	–	.750	2nd	26	21	5	0	.808		Won NAIA Semifinal, 6–2 (Gustavus Adolphus); Lost NAIA Championship, 2–6 (Bemidji State)
1969–70	ICHA	12	10	2	0	–	–	–	.833	T–1st	26	19	7	0	.731		Won NAIA Semifinal, 22–3 (Alaska Methodist); Lost NAIA Championship, 4–7 (Bemidji State)
1970–71	ICHA	12	5	5	2	–	–	–	.500	3rd	24	13	7	4	.625		
1971–72	ICHA	12	12	0	0	-	–	–	1.000	1st	30	20	8	2	.700		Won NAIA Semifinal, 12–2 (Wisconsin State); Won NAIA Championship, 9–3 (Gustavus Adolphus)
1972–73	ICHA	12	8	4	0	–	–	–	.667	1st	30	21	9	0	.700		Lost NAIA Semifinal, 4–8 (Lakehead); Won NAIA consolation game, 11–3 (Gustavus Adolphus)
1972–73	CCHA	12	9	3	0	–	–	–	18	2nd	30	21	9	0	.700		
NCAA Division I
Rick Comley (1973 — 1976)
1973–74	CCHA	8	5	3	0	-	-	-	10	T–1st	39	22	16	1	.577	Won Semifinal, 6–2 (Western Michigan); Lost Championship, 3–8 (Saint Louis)	Won NAIA first round, 7–1 (Concordia); Won NAIA Semifinal, 9–2 (St. Thomas); Won NAIA Championship 4–1, (Bemidji State)
1973–74	CCHA	8	5	3	0	-	-	-	10	T–1st	39	22	16	1	.577	Won Semifinal, 6–2 (Western Michigan); Lost Championship, 3–8 (Saint Louis)	Lost NIT Semifinal, 2–3 (Vermont); Lost NIT Consolation Game, 5–7 (Saint Louis)
1974–75	CCHA	8	2	5	1	-	-	-	5	3rd	35	17	14	1	.686	Won Semifinal, 6–4 (Bowling Green); Lost Championship, 3–8 (Saint Louis)	
1975–76	CCHA	16	9	7	0	-	-	-	18	3rd	37	20	16	1	.554	Lost Semifinal, 1–9 (Saint Louis)	
Rick Yeo (1976 — 1981)
1976–77	CCHA	16	3	13	0	-	-	-	6	5th	33	10	23	0	.303		
1977–78	CCHA	18	7	10	1	-	-	-	15	T–5th	32	18	13	1	.578		
1978–79	CCHA	24	11	12	1	-	-	-	23	4th	36	16	18	2	.472	Lost Semifinal series, 2–18 (Bowling Green)	
1979–80	CCHA	20	2	18	0	-	-	-	4	6th	34	12	21	1	.368		
1980–81	CCHA	22	6	15	1	-	-	-	13	6th	36	14	21	1	.403		
Bill Selman (1981 — 1982)
1981–82	CCHA	28	11	15	2	-	-	-	24	T–7th	39	19	17	3	.526	Lost Quarterfinal series, 5–12 (Michigan State)	
Frank Anzalone (1982 — 1990)
1982–83	CCHA	32	10	21	1	-	-	-	21	11th	36†	12†	23†	1†	.347		
1983–84	CCHA	28	12	17	1	-	-	-	.417	8th	40	18	20	2	.475	Lost Quarterfinal series, 10–13 (Bowling Green)	
1984–85	CCHA	32	21	11	0	-	-	-	42	2nd	44	27	16	1	.625	Won Quarterfinal series, 10–7 (Michigan); Won Semifinal, 4–1 (Bowling Green); Lost Championship, 1–5 (Michigan State)	Lost Quarterfinal series, 6–10 (Rensselaer)
1985–86	CCHA	32	17	14	1	-	-	-	35	4th	43	24	18	1	.570	Won Quarterfinal series, 2–0 (Ohio State); Lost Semifinal, 2–3 (Michigan State); Lost Third Place, 0–3 (Bowling Green)	
1986–87	CCHA	32	19	11	2	-	-	-	40	3rd	40	22	16	2	.575	Lost Quarterfinal series, 1–2 (Ohio State)	
1987–88	CCHA	32	22	4	6	-	-	-	50	1st	46	33	7	6	.783	Won Quarterfinal series, 2–0 (Ohio State); Won Semifinal, 5–4 (OT) (Western Michigan); Lost Championship, 3–5 (Bowling Green)	Won Quarterfinal series, 8–4 (Merrimack); Won Semifinal, 8–3 (Maine); Won National Championship, 4–3 (OT) (St. Lawrence)
1988–89	CCHA	32	19	7	6	-	-	-	44	2nd	46	29	11	6	.696	Won Quarterfinal series, 2–0 (Ferris State); Won Semifinal, 6–3 (Illinois–Chicago); Lost Championship, 1–4 (Michigan State)	Won First Round series, 2–0 (St. Cloud State); Lost Quarterfinal series, 0–2 (Harvard)
1989–90	CCHA	32	24	6	2	-	-	-	50	2nd	46	33	10	3	.750	Won Quarterfinal series, 2–0 (Miami); Won Semifinal, 4–2 (Bowling Green); Lost Championship, 3–4 (Michigan State)	Won First Round series, 2–0 (Alaska–Anchorage); Lost Quarterfinal series, 0–2 (Colgate)
Jeff Jackson (1990 — 1996)
1990–91	CCHA	32	26	2	4	-	-	-	56	1st	45	36	5	4	.844	Won Quarterfinal series, 2–0 (Illinois–Chicago); Won Semifinal, 11–4 (Western Michigan); Won Championship, 6–5 (OT) (Michigan)	Lost Quarterfinal series, 1–2 (Clarkson)
1991–92	CCHA	32	20	8	4	-	-	-	44	2nd	43	30	9	4	.744	Won Quarterfinal series, 2–0 (Illinois–Chicago); Won Semifinal, 5–3 (Michigan State); Won Championship, 3–1 (Michigan)	Won Regional Quarterfinal, 7–3 (Alaska–Anchorage); Won Regional Semifinal, 8–3 (Minnesota); Won National Semifinal, 4–2 (Michigan State); Won National Championship, 5–3 (Wisconsin)
1992–93	CCHA	30	20	5	5	-	-	-	45	3rd	45	32	8	5	.767	Won First Round series, 2–0 (Illinois–Chicago); Won Quarterfinal, 7–1 (Bowling Green); Won Semifinal, 5–3 (Michigan); Won Championship, 3–0 (Miami)	Won Regional Semifinal, 4–3 (Minnesota–Duluth); Won National Semifinal, 4–2 (Boston University); Lost National Championship, 4–5 (Maine)
1993–94	CCHA	30	18	8	4	-	-	-	40	2nd	45	31	10	4	.733	Won First Round series, 2–0 (Ohio State); Won Semifinal, 4–0 (Michigan State); Lost Championship, 0–3 (Michigan)	Won Eegional Quarterfinal, 6–5 (OT) (Northeastern); Won Regional Semifinal, 5–4 (OT) (Michigan); Won National Semifinal, 3–2 (OT) (Harvard); Won National Championship, 9–1 (Boston University)
1994–95	CCHA	27	14	9	4	-	-	-	32	T–4th	41	23	12	6	.634	Won Quarterfinal series, 2–0 (Western Michigan); Won Play-In, 5–2 (Miami); Won Semifinal, 5–4 (OT) (Michigan); Won Championship, 5–3 (Michigan State)	Won Regional Quarterfinal, 5–4 (Clarkson); Lost Regional Semifinal, 2–6 (Boston University)
1995–96	CCHA	30	22	6	2	-	-	-	46	T–1st	40	30	8	2	.775	Won First Round series, 2–0 (Ohio State); Won Semifinal, 7–0 (Bowling Green); Lost Championship, 3–4 (Michigan)	Won Regional Quarterfinal, 5–4 (Cornell); Lost Regional Semifinal, 1–2 (Vermont)
Scott Borek (1996 — 2001)
1996–97	CCHA	27	15	8	4	-	-	-	34	4th	38	19	14	5	.566	Lost Quarterfinal series, 0–2 (Bowling Green)	
1997–98	CCHA	30	12	14	4	-	-	-	28	T–6th	37	15	18	4	.459	Lost Quarterfinal series, 0–2 (Ohio State)	
1998–99	CCHA	30	10	17	3	-	-	-	23	8th	38	11	23	4	.342	Lost Quarterfinal series, 0–2 (Michigan State)	
1999–00	CCHA	28	17	9	2	-	-	-	36	T–3rd	36	18	16	2	.528	Lost Quarterfinal series, 0–2 (Bowling Green)	
2000–01	CCHA	28	8	20	0	-	-	-	16	12th	36	13	23	0	.361		
Frank Anzalone (2001 — 2005)
2001–02	CCHA	28	4	22	2	-	-	-	10	12th	37	8	27	2	.243	Lost First Round series, 1–2 (Michigan)	
2002–03	CCHA	28	3	24	1	-	-	-	7	12th	38	6	28	4	.211	Lost First Round series, 0–2 (Ferris State)	
2003–04	CCHA	28	7	16	5	-	-	-	19	11th	36	9	20	7	.408	Lost First Round series, 0–2 (Miami)	
2004–05	CCHA	28	8	14	6	-	-	-	22	9th	38	9	22	7	.329	Lost First Round series, 0–2 (Nebraska-Omaha)	
Jim Roque (2005 — 2014)
2005–06	CCHA	28	11	12	5	-	-	-	27	T–6th	36	15	14	7	.514	Lost First Round series, 0–2 (Western Michigan)	
2006–07	CCHA	28	11	14	3	-	-	-	25	8th	43	21	19	3	.523	Won First Round series, 2–1 (Ferris State); Won Quarterfinal series, 2–0 (Miami); Lost Semifinal, 0–3 (Notre Dame)	
2007–08	CCHA	28	7	15	6	-	-	-	20	T-9th	37	10	20	7	.365	Lost First Round series, 1–2 (Bowling Green)	
2008–09	CCHA	28	7	15	6	-	-	1	21	T–10th	39	11	20	8	.385	Lost First Round series, 1–2 (Western Michigan)	
2009–10	CCHA	28	10	15	3	-	-	3	35	10th	38	15	18	5	.461	Lost First Round series, 0–2 (Michigan)	
2010–11	CCHA	28	8	12	8	-	-	5	37	8th	39	13	17	9	.449	Won First Round series, 2–0 (Ohio State); Lost CCHA Quarterfinal Series, 0–2 (Notre Dame)	
2011–12	CCHA	28	11	13	4	-	-	4	41	7th	40	18	17	5	.513	Won First Round series, 2–0 (Alaska); Lost CCHA Quarterfinal series, 0–2 (Western Michigan)	
2012–13	CCHA	28	11	16	1	-	-	1	35	8th	39	17	21	1	.449	Lost First Round series, 1–2 (Bowling Green)	
2013–14	WCHA	28	12	16	0	-	-	–	24	T-8th	36	16	19	1	.458		
Damon Whitten (2014 — Present)
2014–15	WCHA	28	7	20	1	-	-	–	15	T-8th	38	8	28	2	.237	Lost First Round series, 0–2 (Minnesota State)	
2015–16	WCHA	28	10	13	5	–	-	-	25	7th	41	14	22	5	.402	Lost First Round series, 1–2 (Minnesota State)	
2016–17	WCHA	28	8	13	7	-	-	4	35	7th	36	11	18	7	.403	Lost First Round series, 0–2 (Michigan Tech)	
2017–18	WCHA	28	8	17	3	-	-	0	27	9th	36	10	22	4	.333		
2018–19	WCHA	28	16	10	2	-	-	0	50	4th	38	23	13	2	.632	Won first round series, 2–0 (Bemidji State); Lost Semifinal series, 0–2 (Minnesota State)	
2019–20	WCHA	28	11	13	4	-	-	4	41	7th	41	14	23	4	.390	Lost first round series, 1–2 (Bemidji State)	
2020–21	WCHA	14	9	5	0	2	2	0	27	T–2nd	29	19	7	3	.707	Won Quarterfinal series, 2–0 (Alabama–Huntsville); Won Semifinal, 4–1 (Bemidji State); Won Championship, 6–3 (Northern Michigan)	Lost NCAA regional semifinal, 1–5 (Massachusetts)
2021–22	CCHA	26	13	13	0	1	1	0	39	4th	37	18	18	1	.500	Lost Quarterfinal series, 1–2 (Northern Michigan)	
2022–23	CCHA	26	8	17	1	2	1	1	25	8th	36	9	25	2	.278	Lost Quarterfinal series, 0–2 (Minnesota State)	
2023–24	CCHA	24	11	12	1	2	2	0	35	7th	38	17	20	1	.461	Won Quarterfinal series, 2–1 (St. Thomas); Lost Semifinal, 1–4 (Bemidji State)	
2024–25	CCHA	26	10	15	1	0	4	0	.449	8th	36	12	22	2	.361	Lost Quarterfinal series, 0–2 (Minnesota State)	
2025–26	CCHA	26	8	16	2	1	4	2	31	7th	36	11	22	3	.347	Lost Quarterfinal series, 0–2 (St. Thomas)	
Totals											GP	W	L	T	%	Championships	
Regular season											2059	982	895	182	.521	4 ICHA Championships, 4 CCHA Championships	
Conference Post-season											131	66	65	0	.504	4 CCHA tournament championships, 1 WCHA tournament championship	
NCAA Post-season											33	20	12	1	.621	11 NCAA Tournament appearances, 6 NAIA Tournament appearances, 1 NIT Tournament appearance	
Regular season and Post-season Record											2223	1068	972	183	.522	3 NCAA Division I National Championships, 2 NAIA national championships	

* Winning percentage is used when conference schedules are unbalanced.
† Bill Selman Resigned in December 1982.
