= 1983 NAIA ice hockey championship =

1983 NAIA Ice Hockey Championship
- 1983

Tournament information
- Sport: ice hockey
- Location: Superior, Wisconsin
- Dates: February 25, 1983–February 26, 1983
- Venue: Wessman Arena
- Teams: 4

Final positions
- Champion: Wisconsin-River Falls
- Runner-up: Michigan-Dearborn

Tournament statistics
- Winning coach: George Gwozdecky

The 1983 NAIA men's ice hockey tournament involved four schools playing in single-elimination bracket to determine the national champion of men's NAIA college ice hockey. The 1983 tournament was the 16th men's ice hockey tournament to be sponsored by the NAIA. The tournament began on February 25, 1983, and ended with the championship game on February 25, 1983.

== Bracket ==
Wessman Arena, Superior, Wisconsin

Semifinals; February 25
Wisconsin-River Falls	7
Hawthorne College	0
Michigan-Dearborn	4***
Wisconsin-Superior	3

National championship February 26
Wisconsin-River Falls	12
Michigan-Dearborn	5
Third-place game
Wisconsin-Superior	9
Hawthorne College	6

Note: * denotes overtime period(s)
