= 1982 NAIA ice hockey championship =

1981 NAIA Ice Hockey Championship
- 1981

Tournament information
- Sport: ice hockey
- Location: Superior, Wisconsin
- Dates: March 5, 1981–March 7, 1981
- Venue(s): Wessman Arena
- Teams: 8

Final positions
- Champion: Augsburg
- Runner-up: Wisconsin–Superior

Tournament statistics
- Winning coach: Ed Saugestad

The 1981 NAIA Men's Ice Hockey Tournament involved eight schools playing in single-elimination bracket to determine the national champion of men's NAIA college ice hockey. The 1981 tournament was the 15th men's ice hockey tournament to be sponsored by the NAIA. The tournament began on March 5, 1981 and ended with the championship game on March 7, 1981.

Ed Saugestad was named NAIA National Coach of the Year in 1982.

== Bracket ==
=== 1982 Tournament ===
Wessman Arena, Superior, Wisconsin

First Round; February 25
1 | Augsburg | 7
8 | Wisconsin–Eau Claire | 6
4 | Michigan–Dearborn | 11
5 | Wisconsin–Superior | 7
2 | Bemidji State | 6
7 | Hamline | 2
3 | Wisconsin–River Falls | 5*
6 | Bethel | 4

Semifinals; February 26
1 | Augsburg | 8
4 | Michigan–Dearborn | 2
2 | Bemidji State | 7
3 | Wisconsin–River Falls | 0

National Championship; February 27
1 | Augsburg | 6
2 | Bemidji State | 3
Third place
4 | Michigan–Dearborn | 4
3 | Wisconsin–River Falls | 2

Consolation round
5 | Wisconsin–Superior | 6
8 | Wisconsin–Eau Claire | 2
6 | Bethel | 5
7 | Hamline | 4

Fifth place
5 | Wisconsin–Superior | 2
6 | Bethel | 5

Note: * denotes overtime period(s)
