= 1976 NAIA ice hockey championship =

1976 NAIA Ice Hockey Championship
- 1976

Tournament information
- Sport: ice hockey
- Location: Superior, Wisconsin
- Dates: February 27, 1976–March 1, 1976
- Host: Wisconsin–Superior
- Venue: Wessman Arena
- Teams: 8

Final positions
- Champion: Wisconsin-Superior
- Runner-up: St. Scholastica

Tournament statistics
- Winning coach: Wally Akervik

The 1976 NAIA Men's Ice Hockey Tournament involved eight schools playing in single-elimination bracket to determine the national champion of men's NAIA college ice hockey. The 1976 tournament was the ninth men's ice hockey tournament to be sponsored by the NAIA. The tournament began on February 27, 1976 and ended with the championship game on March 1, 1976.

== Bracket ==
Wessman Arena, Superior, Wisconsin

First Round; February 27
1	Bemidji State	4
8	Wisconsin-Stout	2
4	Wisconsin-Superior	10
5	Wisconsin-River Falls#	3
3	St. Scholastica	8
6	Augsburg	0
2	Gustavus Adolphus	22
7	Maine at Portland-Gorham	1

Semifinals; February 28
1	Bemidji State	3
4	Wisconsin-Superior	4
2	Gustavus Adolphus	5
3	St. Scholastica	6*

National Championship; March 1
4	Wisconsin-Superior	8
3	St. Scholastica	5
Third place
1	Bemidji State	4
2	Gustavus Adolphus	5

Note: * denotes overtime period(s)
Note: # Wisconsin-River Falls replaced Chicago State, who had a previously scheduled series with Air Force, February 27-28
