= 1981 NAIA ice hockey championship =

1981 NAIA Ice Hockey Championship
- 1981

Tournament information
- Sport: ice hockey
- Location: River Falls, Wisconsin
- Dates: March 5, 1981–March 7, 1981
- Venue(s): Hunt Arena
- Teams: 8

Final positions
- Champion: Augsburg
- Runner-up: Wisconsin-Superior

Tournament statistics
- Winning coach: Ed Saugestad

The 1981 NAIA Men's Ice Hockey Tournament involved eight schools playing in single-elimination bracket to determine the national champion of men's NAIA college ice hockey. The 1981 tournament was the 14th men's ice hockey tournament to be sponsored by the NAIA. The tournament began on March 5, 1981 and ended with the championship game on March 7, 1981.

Ed Saugestad was named NAIA National Coach of the Year in 1981.

== Bracket ==
Hunt Arena, River Falls, Wisconsin

First Round; March 5
1	Bemidji State	5
8	St. Mary’s (Minnesota)	1
4	Wisconsin-Superior	7
5	St. Thomas	6
2	Augsburg	9
7	Wisconsin-River Falls	2
3	Michigan–Dearborn	6
6	St. Olaf	4

Semifinals; March 6
1	Bemidji State	4
4	Wisconsin-Superior	6
2	Augsburg	7
3	Michigan-Dearborn	4

National Championship; March 7
2	Augsburg	8
4	Wisconsin-Superior	3
Third place
1	Bemidji State	11
3	Michigan-Dearborn	2

Note: * denotes overtime period(s)
