= 1971 NAIA ice hockey championship =

1971 NAIA Ice Hockey Championship
- 1971

Tournament information
- Sport: ice hockey
- Location: Bemidji, Minnesota
- Dates: March 6, 1971–March 7, 1971
- Venue: John S. Glas Field House
- Teams: 4

Final positions
- Champion: Bemidji State
- Runner-up: Lakehead University

Tournament statistics
- Winning coach: Bob Peters

The 1971 NAIA men's ice hockey tournament involved four schools playing in single-elimination bracket to determine the national champion of men's NAIA college ice hockey. The 1971 tournament was the fourth men's ice hockey tournament to be sponsored by the NAIA. The tournament began on March 6, 1971, and ended with the championship game on March 7.

Bemidji State and Gustavus Adolphus attended the tournament for the fourth straight year while Augsburg College and Lakehead University made the tournament for the first time. With the addition of Lakehead, the 1971 tournament marked the first occasion that teams from United States and Canada made up the field. Bemidji and Lakehead, both members of the ICHA, reached the championship game to make it the fourth straight that the title game featured two ICHA teams. Bemidji defeated Lakehead to win the team's fourth-straight NAIA championship.

== Bracket ==
John S. Glas Field House, Bemidji, Minnesota

Semifinals; March 6
Bemidji State	12
Augsburg	1
Lakehead	6
Gustavus Adolphus	5

National championship March 7
Bemidji State	6
Lakehead	2
Third-place game
Augsburg	8
Gustavus Adolphus	6

Note: * denotes overtime period(s)
