= Wisconsin–River Falls Falcons men's ice hockey =

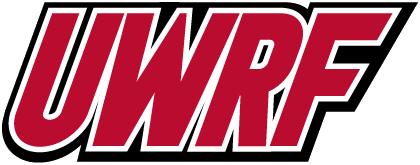
- University: University of Wisconsin-River Falls
- Conference: WIAC
- Head coach: Steve Freeman; 27th season, 423–246–62 (.621)
- Arena: Hunt Arena; River Falls, Wisconsin
- Colors: Red and White
- Fight song: The Pledge Song

NCAA tournament champions
- 1988, 1994

NCAA tournament runner-up
- 1993

NCAA tournament Frozen Four
- 1988, 1993, 1994, 1995, 1996, 2001

NCAA tournament appearances
- 1984, 1988, 1993, 1994, 1995, 1996, 1998, 2001, 2003, 2004, 2007

NAIA tournament champions
- 1983

NAIA tournament appearances
- 1975, 1976, 1977, 1978, 1979, 1980, 1981, 1982, 1983

Conference tournament champions
- 2015

Conference regular season champions
- WIAC: 1982, 1983, 1984, 1985, 1986, 1987, 1988, 1999, 2001, 2004, 2005, 2006, 2007, 2008, 2010, 2012, 2014, 2016; NCHA: 1988, 1996, 2007

Wisconsin–River Falls Falcons men's ice hockey is the University of Wisconsin-River Falls (UWRF) ice hockey team at the university. UWRF is a Division III hockey team, a part of the National Collegiate Athletic Association (NCAA). The Falcons are a part of the Wisconsin Intercollegiate Athletic Conference (WIAC), which is also a part of the Northern Collegiate Hockey Association (NCHA). However, the WIAC announced in February 2012 that they would be leaving the NCHA due to budgetary reasons, effective for the 2014–15 season.

The Falcons have won three national titles, one as a part of the National Association of Intercollegiate Athletics (NAIA) in 1983, and two NCAA national titles in 1988 and 1994. The Falcons play at Hunt Arena, which opened in 1973. Steve Freeman is the head coach of the Falcons and is the all-time wins leader for both UWRF and the WIAC with over 400 wins.

== Records history ==
As of January 2025

- NAIA National Champions: 1983
- NCAA National Champions: 1988, 1994
- NCHA Champions: 1988, 1996, 2007
- WIAC Champions: 1982, 1983, 1984, 1985, 1986, 1987, 1988, 1999, 2001, 2004, 2005, 2006, 2007, 2008, 2010, 2012, 2014, 2016
- WIAC Playoff Champions (Commissioner's Cup): 2015

== Coaching ==
Name	Career
Jack Agnew	2–3–0
Walt Granata	9–13–0
Tom Younghans	9–1–0
Gwyn Christensen	10–2–0
Jim Helminiak	28–37–1
Don Joseph	116–97–1
George Gwozdecky	66–29–2
Mike McGraw	15–12–0
Craig Dahl	15–12–3
Rick Kozuback	65–26–5
Dean Talafous	110–84–18
Steve Freeman	423–246–62

== National tournament history ==
=== NAIA tournament ===
Wisconsin–River Falls participated in the NAIA national tournament nine times. The Falcons won one National Championship, made the semifinals five times, and had a record of 6–12.

Year	Round	Opponent	Score
1975	Quarterfinals	Gustavus Adolphus	L 0–8
1976	Quarterfinals	Wisconsin–Superior	L 3–10
1977	Quarterfinals	St. Scholastica	L 4–6
1978	Quarterfinals	St. Scholastica	W 3–2
1978	Semifinals	Augsburg	L 2–10
1978	3rd Place Game	St. Thomas	L 3–7
1979	Quarterfinals	Gustavus Adolphus	W 4–3 ^{OT}
1979	Semifinals	Bemidji State	L 5–7
1979	3rd Place Game	St. Scholastica	L 2–4
1980	Quarterfinals	Concordia (Moorhead)	W 5–4
1980	Semifinals	Michigan–Dearborn	L 4–5
1980	3rd Place Game	Wisconsin–Superior	L 4–11
1981	Quarterfinals	Augsburg	L 2–9
1982	Quarterfinals	Bethel Royals	W 5–4 ^{OT}
1982	Semifinals	Bemidji State	L 0–7
1982	3rd Place Game	Michigan–Dearborn	L 2–4
1983	Semifinals	Hawthorne College	W 7–0
1983	National Championship	Michigan–Dearborn	W 12–5

=== NCAA Division III tournament ===
Wisconsin–River Falls has participated in the NCAA Division III men's ice hockey tournament 11 times. The Falcons have won two National Championships, made the Frozen Four six times, and have a record of 24–13.

Year	Round	Opponent	Score
1984	Quarterfinals	Union	L 0–4
1984	Quarterfinals	Union	W 6–4
1984	Quarterfinals	Union	L 6–8
1988	Quarterfinals	Wisconsin–Stevens Point	W 6–5
1988	Quarterfinals	Wisconsin–Stevens Point	W 9–5
1988	Semifinals	Bemidji State	W 6–4
1988	Semifinals	Bemidji State	W 5–3
1988	National Championship	Elmira	W 7–1
1988	National Championship	Elmira	L 3–5
1988	National Championship	Elmira	W 3–0
1993	Quarterfinals	Gustavus Adolphus	W 5–2
1993	Quarterfinals	Gustavus Adolphus	W 4–2
1993	Semifinals	Plattsburgh State	W 4–2
1993	National Championship	Wisconsin–Stevens Point	L 3–4 ^{OT}
1994	Quarterfinals	Wisconsin–Stevens Point	W 4–2
1994	Quarterfinals	Wisconsin–Stevens Point	W 4–3
1994	Semifinals	Fredonia State	W 4–3
1994	National Championship	Wisconsin–Superior	W 6–4
1995	Quarterfinals	Saint Mary's	W 5–1
1995	Quarterfinals	Saint Mary's	W 5–3
1995	Semifinals	Middlebury	L 1–3
1995	3rd Place Game	Wisconsin–Superior	W 6–5 ^{OT}
1996	Quarterfinals	Bowdoin	W 7–1
1996	Quarterfinals	Bowdoin	W 7–3
1996	Semifinals	RIT	L 1–2
1996	3rd Place Game	Wisconsin–Superior	W 8–2
1998	Quarterfinals	Augsburg	L 2–3
1998	Quarterfinals	Augsburg	L 3–4
2001	Quarterfinals	New England College	W 8–1
2001	Quarterfinals	New England College	W 2–1
2001	Semifinals	RIT	L 2–5
2001	3rd Place Game	Wisconsin–Superior	L 1–3
2003	First Round	Saint John's	W 2–0
2003	Quarterfinals	St. Norbert	L 2–5
2004	First Round	St. Thomas	W 3–2 ^{OT}
2004	Quarterfinals	St. Norbert	L 0–3
2007	First Round	Bethel	L 1–2

== Current roster ==
As of November 8, 2026.

No.	Nat.	Player	Class	Pos	Height	Weight	DoB	Hometown	Previous team	NHL rights
1	(Canada)	Christopher Quizi	Freshman	G	6' 4" (1.93 m)	185 lb (84 kg)	2005-06-11	Bradford, Ontario	Steinbach Pistons (MJHL)	—
2	(United States)	Tyler Waram	Sophomore	D	6' 2" (1.88 m)	200 lb (91 kg)	2003-03-11	Edmonds, Washington	Alaska (NCAA)	—
4	(United States)	Cole Teleki	Junior	D	6' 2" (1.88 m)	195 lb (88 kg)	2002-03-13	Argyle, Texas	Lindenwood (NCAA)	—
5	(United States)	Drew Belleson	Freshman	D	6' 1" (1.85 m)	214 lb (97 kg)	2005-04-02	Dayton, Minnesota	Philadelphia Rebels (NAHL)	—
6	(United States)	Zach Sondreal	Sophomore	D	6' 1" (1.85 m)	190 lb (86 kg)	2004-02-19	Woodbury, Minnesota	Chippewa Steel (NAHL)	—
7	(United States)	Anthony Cappello	Freshman	F	6' 4" (1.93 m)	187 lb (85 kg)	2005-08-26	Ossining, New York	Minnesota Wilderness (NAHL)	—
9	(United States)	Trace Day	Freshman	F	6' 4" (1.93 m)	209 lb (95 kg)	2005-01-19	Mesa, Arizona	Oklahoma Warriors (NAHL)	—
10	(United States)	Ethan Lindahl	Junior	F	5' 10" (1.78 m)	165 lb (75 kg)	2003-02-11	Andover, Minnesota	St. Cloud Norsemen (NAHL)	—
11	(Canada)	Alex Atwill	Junior	F	6' 0" (1.83 m)	175 lb (79 kg)	2003-07-07	Thunder Bay, Ontario	Grande Prairie Storm (AJHL)	—
12	(United States)	Logan Nagle	Freshman	D	6' 2" (1.88 m)	190 lb (86 kg)	2005-02-18	Post Falls, Idaho	Minnesota Wilderness (NAHL)	—
13	(United States)	Reid Lune	Junior	F	6' 4" (1.93 m)	205 lb (93 kg)	2003-01-11	Edwards, Illinois	Johnstown Tomahawks (NAHL)	—
14	(United States)	Damon Bickler	Freshman	D	5' 10" (1.78 m)	174 lb (79 kg)	2005-03-08	Flower Mound, Texas	New Mexico Ice Wolves (NAHL)	—
15	(United States)	Luke Margenau	Sophomore	D	5' 11" (1.8 m)	175 lb (79 kg)	2004-09-11	Maple Grove, Minnesota	Minnesota Wilderness (NAHL)	—
16	(United States)	Connor Brust	Junior	D	6' 2" (1.88 m)	200 lb (91 kg)	2003-02-20	Forest Lake, Minnesota	Austin Bruins (NAHL)	—
17	(United States)	Jonny Meiers	Senior	F	6' 0" (1.83 m)	200 lb (91 kg)	2002-07-15	Eagan, Minnesota	Maine Nordiques (NAHL)	—
18	(United States)	Tyler Lee	Junior	D	5' 9" (1.75 m)	170 lb (77 kg)	2003-03-05	Claremont, California	Yarmouth Mariners (MJAHL)	—
19	(United States)	Gavin Middendorf	Sophomore	F	5' 11" (1.8 m)	180 lb (82 kg)	2004-06-18	Wyoming, Minnesota	Minot Minotauros (NAHL)	—
20	(Finland)	Aaron Martikainen	Freshman	D	6' 0" (1.83 m)	179 lb (81 kg)	2005-08-13	Espoo, Finland	Springfield Jr. Blues (NAHL)	—
21	(United States)	Billie Jacobson-Couch	Freshman	F	6' 2" (1.88 m)	185 lb (84 kg)	2005-06-22	Eden Prairie, Minnesota	Ogden Mustangs (NCDC)	—
22	(United States)	Ben Portner	Sophomore	F	6' 0" (1.83 m)	179 lb (81 kg)	2004-03-09	Lakeville, Minnesota	Langley Rivermen (BCHL)	—
23	(United States)	Hunter Jones	Senior	F	5' 10" (1.78 m)	190 lb (86 kg)	2002-07-13	Andover, Minnesota	American International (AHA)	—
24	(Canada)	Owen Belisle	Senior	F	6' 3" (1.91 m)	190 lb (86 kg)	2001-03-02	Thunder Bay, Ontario	Brockville Braves (CCHL)	—
25	(United States)	Wyatt Witham	Freshman	F	6' 0" (1.83 m)	185 lb (84 kg)	2005-04-01	Roseville, Minnesota	Selkirk Steelers (MJHL)	—
26	(Canada)	Keenan Ingram	Sophomore	F	6' 4" (1.93 m)	215 lb (98 kg)	2004-08-31	Calgary, Alberta	Langley Rivermen (BCHL)	—
27	(United States)	Garett Drotts	Junior	F	6' 0" (1.83 m)	174 lb (79 kg)	2003-11-21	Grand Rapids, Minnesota	Augustana (CCHA)	—
29	(Finland)	Lukas Wallinheimo	Freshman	F	6' 3" (1.91 m)	201 lb (91 kg)	2005-09-17	Jyväskylä, Finland	Springfield Jr. Blues (NAHL)	—
30	(United States)	Nolan LaCosse	Junior	G	6' 1" (1.85 m)	175 lb (79 kg)	2003-08-04	Stillwater, Minnesota	Alexandria Blizzard (NA3HL)	—
33	(Denmark)	Valdemar Andersen	Freshman	G	6' 4" (1.93 m)	204 lb (93 kg)	2005-03-14	Herning, Denmark	Minnesota Wilderness (NAHL)	—
