= 1975 NAIA ice hockey championship =

1975 NAIA Ice Hockey Championship
- 1975

Tournament information
- Sport: ice hockey
- Location: Superior, Wisconsin
- Dates: March 1, 1975–March 3, 1975
- Host: Wisconsin–Superior
- Venue: Wessman Arena
- Teams: 8

Final positions
- Champion: St. Scholastica
- Runner-up: Gustavus Adolphus

Tournament statistics
- Winning coach: Del Genereau

The 1975 NAIA Men's Ice Hockey Tournament involved eight schools playing in single-elimination bracket to determine the national champion of men's NAIA college ice hockey. The 1975 tournament was the eighth men's ice hockey tournament to be sponsored by the NAIA. The tournament began on March 1, 1975, and ended with the championship game on March 3.

With the growing number of NAIA hockey teams, the tournament field was again expanded from six to eight teams. Gustavus Adolphus attended the tournament for the eighth straight year. Augsburg, Lakehead, St Thomas, and Wisconsin-Superior made the tournament for the third time and initial appearances by St. Scholastica, Wisconsin–River Falls, and Wisconsin–Stout. Just three two seasons after St. Scholastica added men's hockey as the college's first varsity sport, the Saints reached the NAIA Hockey Championship with their first 20-win regular season. The Saints blew open the tournament with a 9–0 win over Wisconsin-Stout before defeating Augsburg 5–4 in the semifinal round. The Saints defeated Gustavus Adolphus with a 7–1 victory to earn the school's first NAIA national championship.

== Bracket ==
Wessman Arena, Superior, Wisconsin

First Round; March 1
St. Scholastica	9
Wisconsin-Stout	0
Augsburg	9
Wisconsin-Superior	5
Gustavus Adolphus	8
Wisconsin-River Falls	0
St. Thomas	8
Lakehead	4

Semifinals; March 2
St. Scholastica	5
Augsburg	4
Gustavus Adolphus	8
St. Thomas	3

National Championship; March 3
St. Scholastica	7
Gustavus Adolphus	1
Third place
St. Thomas	8
Augsburg	4

Note: * denotes overtime period(s)
