= 1969 NAIA ice hockey championship =

1969 NAIA Ice Hockey Championship
- 1969

Tournament information
- Sport: ice hockey
- Location: Sault Ste. Marie, Michigan
- Dates: March 7, 1969–March 8, 1969
- Venue(s): Pullar Stadium
- Teams: 4

Final positions
- Champion: Bemidji State
- Runner-up: Lake Superior State

Tournament statistics
- Winning coach: Bob Peters

The 1969 NAIA men's ice hockey tournament involved four schools playing in single-elimination bracket to determine the national champion of men's NAIA college ice hockey. The 1969 tournament was the second men's ice hockey tournament to be sponsored by the NAIA. The tournament began on March 7, 1969, and ended with the championship game on March 8.

The championship game was a rematch of the 1968 championship game between two ICHA conference rivals Bemidji State College (BSC) and Lake Superior State College (LSSC) against each other. After a 23–2–0 overall record and an 11–1–0 ICHA regular season record, the Beavers were a clear top seed in the tournament, held in Sault Ste. Marie, MI. Bemidji defeated Salem State 14–2 in the semifinal round and advanced to play the host Lakers in the title game, going on to win the second straight NAIA championship with a 6–2 victory.

== Brackets ==
Pullar Stadium, Sault Ste. Marie, Michigan

Semifinals; March 7
Bemidji State	13
Salem State	2
Lake Superior State	6
Gustavus Adolphus	2

National championship March 8
Bemidji State	6
Lake Superior State	2
Third-place game
Gustavus Adolphus	6
Salem State	2

Note: * denotes overtime period(s)
