= 1977 NAIA ice hockey championship =

1977 NAIA Ice Hockey Championship
- 1977

Tournament information
- Sport: ice hockey
- Location: Superior, Wisconsin
- Dates: February 25, 1977–February 27, 1977
- Host: Wisconsin–Superior
- Venue: Wessman Arena
- Teams: 8

Final positions
- Champion: St. Scholastica
- Runner-up: Gustavus Adolphus

Tournament statistics
- Winning coach: Max Ramsland

The 1977 NAIA Men's Ice Hockey Tournament involved eight schools playing in single-elimination bracket to determine the national champion of men's NAIA college ice hockey. The 1977 tournament was the tenth men's ice hockey tournament to be sponsored by the NAIA. The tournament began on February 25, 1977 and ended with the championship game on February 27, 1977.

== Bracket ==
Wessman Arena, Superior, Wisconsin

First Round; February 25
1	Bemidji State	11
8	St. Francis (Maine)	0
4	St. Scholastica	6
5	Wisconsin-River Falls	4
3	Augsburg	4
6	Wisconsin-Superior	3
2	Gustavus Adolphus	10
7	Ferris State #	3

Semifinals; February 26
1	Bemidji State	2
4	St. Scholastica	4
2	Gustavus Adolphus	5
3	Augsburg	3

National Championship; February 27
2	Gustavus Adolphus	2
4	St. Scholastica	3
Third place
1	Bemidji State	5
3	Augsburg	2

Note: * denotes overtime period(s)
Note: # Ferris State replaced Hillsdale College, who turned down the invitation due to cost of attending the tournament
