= Gary Ross (ice hockey) =

American ice hockey player

Personal information
- Born: December 8, 1953 (age 72) Roseau, Minnesota, United States
- Height: 6 ft 0 in (183 cm)
- Weight: 198 lb (90 kg)

Sport
- Sport: Ice hockey
- Position: Defense

Gary Ross (born December 8, 1953) is an American ice hockey player. Ross went to the University of North Dakota to play College ice hockey, along with his teammate Dave Christian. He played the North Dakota Fighting Hawks men's ice hockey team in 1972-73. Ross went to the Bemidji State Beavers men's ice hockey in 1973-75. He competed in the men's tournament at the 1976 Winter Olympics. Ross also participated in initial roster of the 1980 United States Olympic Team, but he didn't make the team.

== Winter Olympic Games history ==
| Year | WINTER OLYMPICS | Location | Rank | Medal |
|---|---|---|---|---|
| 1976 | XII Olympic Winter Games | Innsbruck, Austria | 5th | |
