= 1980 NAIA ice hockey championship =

1980 NAIA Ice Hockey Championship
- 1980

Tournament information
- Sport: ice hockey
- Location: St. Paul, Minnesota
- Dates: March 1, 1980–March 3, 1980
- Venue(s): St. Paul Civic Center
- Teams: 8

Final positions
- Champion: Bemidji State
- Runner-up: Michigan–Dearborn

Tournament statistics
- Winning coach: Bob Peters

The 1980 NAIA Men's Ice Hockey Tournament involved eight schools playing in single-elimination bracket to determine the national champion of men's NAIA college ice hockey. The 1980 tournament was the 13th men's ice hockey tournament to be sponsored by the NAIA. The tournament began on March 1, 1980 and ended with the championship game on March 3, 1980.

== Bracket ==
St. Paul Civic Center, St. Paul, Minnesota

First Round; March 1
1	Bemidji State	5
8	St. Olaf	2
4	St. Thomas	8
5	Wisconsin-Superior	13
2	Augsburg	5
7	Michigan–Dearborn	6
3	Concordia (Moorhead)	4
6	Wisconsin-River Falls	5

Semifinals; March 2
1	Bemidji State	8
5	Wisconsin-Superior	3
6	Wisconsin-River Falls	4
7	Michigan-Dearborn	5

National Championship; March 3
1	Bemidji State	4
7	Michigan-Dearborn	3
Third place
5	Wisconsin-Superior	11
6	Wisconsin-River Falls	4

Note: * denotes overtime period(s)
