= 1984 NAIA ice hockey championship =

1984 NAIA Ice Hockey Championship
- 1984

Tournament information
- Sport: ice hockey
- Location: Eau Claire, Wisconsin
- Dates: March 1, 1984–March 3, 1984
- Venue: Hobbs Municipal Ice Center
- Teams: 4

Final positions
- Champion: Wisconsin–Eau Claire Blugolds men's ice hockey
- Runner-up: Michigan-Dearborn

Tournament statistics
- Winning coach: Wally Akervik All-Tournament Team Goaltenders: Mark MacLean, UW-Eau Claire; Todd Welhouse UW-Superior Defensemen: Jim Brailean, UM-Dearborn; Dave Kukowski, UW-Superior; Scott Parker, UW-Eau Claire; Mike Rickard, Rodger Williams Forwards: Craig Aittama, UM-Dearborn; Steve Blodgett, UW-Eau Claire; Gary Charison, UW-Dearborn; Rich Penick, UW-Eau Claire; Troy Ward, UW-Eau Claire Most Valuable Player: Scott Parker, Wisconsin-Eau Claire Coach of the Year: Wally Akervik, Wisconsin-Eau Claire

The 1984 NAIA Men's Ice Hockey Tournament involved four schools playing in single-elimination bracket to determine the national champion of men's NAIA college ice hockey. The 1984 tournament was the 17th men's ice hockey tournament to be sponsored by the NAIA. The tournament began on March 1, 1983 and ended with the championship game on March 2, 1983.

The 1984 tournament marked the last season that the NAIA sponsored the sport of men's ice hockey at the championship level. A mass-exodus of schools to NCAA Division II and the creation of the Division III men's hockey championship further led to the decline of NAIA Hockey in the decade. In 2016, the NAIA Hockey Coaches Association teamed up with ACHA leadership to form the new NAIA Division that included all NAIA varsity hockey programs, currently there at 10 NAIA programs.

1984 NAIA Ice Hockey Men's All-American Team: University of Wisconsin-Eau Claire: Tom Johnson, Scott Parker, Steve Blodgett, Todd Geisness. Honorable Mention: Steve Falk. Hawthorne College NH: Roland Papin, Bob Helmig. University of Michigan Dearborn: Jim Brailean, Win Dahm. Rodger Williams College RI: John Bessette. University of Wisconsin-Superior: Don Carlson, Dave Kukowski.

== Bracket ==
Hobbs Municipal Ice Center, Eau Claire, Wisconsin

Semifinals; March 1
Wisconsin-Eau Claire	10
Roger Williams	5
Michigan–Dearborn	6
Wisconsin-Superior	2

National Championship; March 2
Wisconsin-Eau Claire	6
Michigan-Dearborn	1
Third Place Game
Wisconsin-Superior	3
Roger Williams	2

Note: * denotes overtime period(s)
