= 1970 NAIA ice hockey championship =

Ice hockey tournament

1970 NAIA Ice Hockey Championship
- 1970

Tournament information
- Sport: ice hockey
- Location: Sault Ste. Marie, Michigan
- Dates: March 6, 1970–March 7, 1970
- Venue: Pullar Stadium
- Teams: 4

Final positions
- Champion: Bemidji State
- Runner-up: Lake Superior State

Tournament statistics
- Winning coach: Bob Peters

The 1970 NAIA men's ice hockey tournament involved four schools playing in single-elimination bracket to determine the national champion of men's NAIA college ice hockey. The 1970 tournament was the third men's ice hockey tournament to be sponsored by the NAIA. The tournament began on March 6, 1970, and ended with the championship game on March 7.

Bemidji State, Lake Superior State, and Gustavus Adolphus attended the tournament for the third straight year while Alaska Methodist made the tournament for the first time. The championship game marked the third straight year that the two ICHA conference rivals Bemidji State College (BSC) and Lake Superior State College (LSSC) met to decide the national title. Bemidji once again defeated Lake Superior State on the Lakers' home ice at Pullar Stadium, Sault Ste. Marie, Michigan.

== Bracket ==
Pullar Stadium, Sault Ste. Marie, Michigan

Semifinals; March 6
Bemidji State	5
Gustavus Adolphus	2
Lake Superior State	22
Alaska Methodist	3

National championship March 7
Bemidji State	7
Lake Superior State	4
Third-place game
Gustavus Adolphus	11
Alaska Methodist	3

Note: * denotes overtime period(s)
