= 1978 NAIA ice hockey championship =

1978 NAIA Ice Hockey Championship
- 1978

Tournament information
- Sport: ice hockey
- Location: St. Paul, Minnesota
- Dates: February 24, 1978–February 26, 1978
- Venue: Coliseum Ice Arena
- Teams: 8

Final positions
- Champion: Augsburg
- Runner-up: Bemidji State

Tournament statistics
- Winning coach: Ed Saugestad

The 1978 NAIA Men's Ice Hockey Tournament involved eight schools playing in single-elimination bracket to determine the national champion of men's NAIA college ice hockey. The 1978 tournament was the 11th men's ice hockey tournament to be sponsored by the NAIA. The tournament began on February 24, 1978 and ended with the championship game on February 26, 1978.

Ed Saugestad was named NAIA National Coach of the Year in 1978.

== Bracket ==
Coliseum Ice Arena, St. Paul, Minnesota

First Round; February 24
1	Bemidji State	16
8	St. Francis (Maine)	2
4	Gustavus Adolphus
5	St. Thomas	6
3	Wisconsin-River Falls	3
6	St. Scholastica	2
2	Augsburg	6
7	Ferris State	4

Semifinals; February 25
1	Bemidji State	7
5	St. Thomas	1
2	Augsburg	10
3	Wisconsin-River Falls	2

National Championship; February 26
1	Bemidji State	3
2	Augsburg	4
Third place
3	Wisconsin-River Falls	3
5	St. Thomas	7

Note: * denotes overtime period(s)
