= 1972 NAIA ice hockey championship =

1972 NAIA Ice Hockey Championship
- 1972

Tournament information
- Sport: ice hockey
- Location: Superior, Wisconsin
- Dates: March 4, 1972–March 5, 1972
- Venue: Wessman Arena
- Teams: 4

Final positions
- Champion: Lake Superior State
- Runner-up: Gustavus Adolphus

Tournament statistics
- Winning coach: Ron Mason

The 1972 NAIA men's ice hockey tournament involved four schools playing in single-elimination bracket to determine the national champion of men's NAIA college ice hockey. The 1972 tournament was the fifth men's ice hockey tournament to be sponsored by the NAIA. The tournament began on March 4, 1972, and ended with the championship game on March 5.

Gustavus Adolphus attended the tournament for the fifth straight year with Lake Superior State making a fourth tournament appearance; both University of Wisconsin–Superior and University of St. Thomas made the tournament for the first time. Lake Superior State reached the championship game for the fourth year in program history. Led my head coach Ron Mason, the Lakers defeated Gustavus Adolphus to win the team's first national championship.

== Bracket ==
Wessman Arena, Superior, Wisconsin

Semifinals; March 4
Lake Superior State	12
Wisconsin-Superior	2
Gustavus Adolphus	5
St. Thomas	3

National championship March 5
Lake Superior State	9
Gustavus Adolphus	3
Third-place game
Wisconsin-Superior	8
St. Thomas	3

Note: * denotes overtime period(s)
