= 1993–94 NCAA Division II men's ice hockey season =

American collegiate ice hockey season

- Duration: October 1993– March 12, 1994
- NCAA tournament: 1994
- National championship: Von Braun Center; Huntsville, Alabama
- NCAA champion: Bemidji State

The 1993–94 NCAA Division II men's ice hockey season began in November 1993 and concluded on March 12, 1994. This was the 22nd season of second-tier college ice hockey.

== Regular season ==
=== Standings ===
1993–94 NCAA Division II Independent ice hockey standings
	Overall record					
	GP	W	L	T	GF	GA
Alabama–Huntsville	26	20	5	1	185	79
Mankato State	27	11	15	1	104	119

Note: the records of teams who were members of Division III conferences during the season can be found here.

== 1994 NCAA Tournament ==
National Championship; March 11–12
W	Bemidji State	3	2	2
E	Alabama–Huntsville	5	1	1

Note: * denotes overtime period(s)
Note: Mini-games in italics

== See also ==
- 1993–94 NCAA Division I men's ice hockey season
- 1993–94 NCAA Division III men's ice hockey season
