= 1994 NCAA Division II men's ice hockey tournament =

- Teams: 2
- Finals site: Von Braun Center, Huntsville, Alabama
- Champions: Bemidji State Beavers (3rd title)
- Runner-up: Alabama-Huntsville Chargers (1st title game)
- Winning coach: Bob Peters (3rd title)
- Attendance: 11,320

The 1994 NCAA Men's Division II Ice Hockey Tournament involved 2 schools playing in a best of three game series to determine the national champion of men's NCAA Division II college ice hockey. A total of 3 games were played, hosted by Alabama-Huntville.

Bemidji State, coached by Bob Peters, won the national title over Alabama-Huntsville, two games to one.

Bernie Adlys, of Bemidji State, was the high scorer of the tournament with four points (1 goal, 3 assists).

== Tournament Format ==
One eastern and one western team were invited to play a modified best-of-three tournament. In the first two games the teams would be awarded points (2 points for a win, one point for a tie) and whichever team had the most points would be the champion. If the teams were tied after two games then a 20-minute mini-game would be played to determine the champion.

== Qualifying teams ==
Team	Record
Bemidji State	20–9–3
Alabama–Huntsville	19–3–1

== Tournament Games ==
National Championship; March 11–12
W	Bemidji State	3	2	2
E	Alabama–Huntsville	5	1	1

Note: * denotes overtime period(s)
Note: Mini-games in italics

== Tournament Awards ==
None Awarded
