= 1979 NAIA ice hockey championship =

1979 NAIA Ice Hockey Championship
- 1979

Tournament information
- Sport: ice hockey
- Location: St. Paul, Minnesota
- Dates: February 23, 1979–February 25, 1979
- Venue: St. Paul Civic Center
- Teams: 8

Final positions
- Champion: Bemidji State
- Runner-up: Concordia (Moorhead)

Tournament statistics
- Winning coach: Bob Peters

The 1979 NAIA Men's Ice Hockey Tournament involved eight schools playing in single-elimination bracket to determine the national champion of men's NAIA college ice hockey. The 1979 tournament was the 12th men's ice hockey tournament to be sponsored by the NAIA. The tournament began on February 23, 1979 and ended with the championship game on February 25, 1979.

== Bracket ==
St. Paul Civic Center, St. Paul, Minnesota

First Round; February 23
1	Bemidji State	17
8	St. Francis (Maine)	1
4	Wisconsin-River Falls	4*
5	Gustavus Adolphus	3
2	Augsburg	3
7	Concordia (Moorhead)	5
3	St. Scholastica	6
6	Wisconsin-Superior	4

Semifinals; February 24
1	Bemidji State	7
4	Wisconsin-River Falls	5
3	St. Scholastica	3
7	Concordia (Moorhead)	6

National Championship; February 25
1	Bemidji State	5
7	Concordia-Moorhead	1
Third place
3	St. Scholastica	4
4	Wisconsin-River Falls	2

Note: * denotes overtime period(s)
