= Blane Comstock =

American ice hockey player

Personal information
- Born: November 3, 1949 (age 76) Roseau, Minnesota, United States

Sport
- Sport: Ice hockey

Blane Comstock (born November 3, 1949) is an American ice hockey player. He competed in the men's tournament at the 1976 Winter Olympics.
