= 1993 NCAA Division III men's ice hockey tournament =

Men's ice hockey tournament

- Teams: 8
- Finals site: Aldrich Arena, Maplewood, Minnesota
- Champions: Wisconsin–Stevens Point Pointers (4th title)
- Runner-up: Wisconsin–River Falls Falcons (2nd title game)
- Semifinalists: Elmira Soaring Eagles (3rd Frozen Four); Plattsburgh State Cardinals (4th Frozen Four)
- Winning coach: Joe Baldarotta (1st title)
- Attendance: 13,900

The 1993 NCAA Division III Men's Ice Hockey Tournament was the culmination of the 1992–93 season, the 10th such tournament in NCAA history. It concluded with Wisconsin-Stevens Point defeating Wisconsin-River Falls in the championship game 4-3 in overtime. All Quarterfinals matchups were held at home team venues, while all succeeding games were played in Maplewood, Minnesota.

== Qualifying teams ==
The following teams qualified for the tournament. There were no automatic bids, however, conference tournament champions were given preferential consideration. No formal seeding was used, quarterfinal matches were arranged so that the road teams would have the shortest possible travel distances.

East						West					
School	Conference	Record	Berth Type	Appearance	Last Bid	School	Conference	Record	Berth Type	Appearance	Last Bid
Babson	ECAC East	18–5–1	At-Large	10th	1992	Gustavus Adolphus	MIAC	19–7–1	Tournament Champion	3rd	1991
Elmira	ECAC West	24–5–0	Tournament Champion	6th	1992	Wisconsin–River Falls	NCHA	16–12–1	At-Large	3rd	1988
Plattsburgh State	SUNYAC	23–4–2	Tournament Champion	4th	1992	Wisconsin–Stevens Point	NCHA	22–4–2	Tournament Champion	6th	1992
Salem State	ECAC East	18–7–1	At-Large	4th	1992	Wisconsin–Superior	NCHA	13–13–2	At-Large	2nd	1992

== Format ==
The tournament featured three rounds of play. In the Quarterfinals, teams played a two-game series where the first team to reach 3 points was declared a winner (2 points for winning a game, 1 point each for tying). If both teams ended up with 2 points after the first two games a 20-minute mini-game used to determine a winner. Mini-game scores are in italics. Beginning with the Semifinals all games became Single-game eliminations. The winning teams in the semifinals advanced to the National Championship Game with the losers playing in a Third Place game. The teams were seeded according to geographic proximity in the quarterfinals so the visiting team would have the shortest feasible distance to travel.

== Bracket ==
Quarterfinals; March 12–13
Plattsburgh State	5	9	-
Babson	2	4	-
Wisconsin–River Falls	5	4	-
Gustavus Adolphus	2	2	-
Salem State	6	4	0
Elmira	2	10	4
Wisconsin–Stevens Point	5	3	2
Wisconsin–Superior	3	8	0

Semifinals; March 26
Plattsburgh State	2
Wisconsin–River Falls	4
Elmira	2
Wisconsin–Stevens Point	7

National Championship; March 27
Wisconsin–River Falls	3
Wisconsin–Stevens Point	4*
Third Place Game
Plattsburgh State	3
Elmira	8

Note: * denotes overtime period(s)
Note: Mini-games in italics

== Record by conference ==
Conference	# of Bids	Record	Win %	Frozen Four	Championship Game	Champions
NCHA	3	7–3	.700	2	2	1
ECAC East	2	1–3	.250	-	-	-
ECAC West	1	2–2	.500	1	-	-
SUNYAC	1	2–2	.500	1	-	-
MIAC	1	0–2	.000	-	-	-
