= 1974 NAIA ice hockey championship =

1974 NAIA Ice Hockey Championship
- 1974

Tournament information
- Sport: ice hockey
- Location: Bemidji, Minnesota
- Dates: March 1, 1974–March 3, 1974
- Host: Bemidji State
- Venue: John S. Glas Field House
- Teams: 6

Final positions
- Champion: Lake Superior State
- Runner-up: Bemidji State

Tournament statistics
- Winning coach: Rick Comley

The 1974 NAIA Men's Ice Hockey Tournament involved six schools playing in single elimination bracket to determine the national champion of men's NAIA college ice hockey. The 1974 tournament was the seventh men's ice hockey tournament to be sponsored by the NAIA. The tournament began on March 1, 1974, and ended with the championship game on March 3.

Gustavus Adolphus attended the tournament for the seventh straight year while Bemidji State and Lake Superior State each made the tournament for the sixth time. St. Thomas and Wisconsin-Superior each made their second tournament appearances with Concordia College (Moorhead) making the team's first appearance. Bemidji State hosted the 1974 NAIA championship but fell 4-1 to Rick Comley's Lake Superior State team in the championship game.

== Bracket ==
John S. Glas Fieldhouse, Bemidji, Minnesota

First Round; March 1
Lake Superior State	7
Concordia (Moorhead)	1
Gustavus Adolphus	10
Wisconsin-Superior	2

Semifinals; March 2
Lake Superior State	9
St. Thomas	2
Bemidji State	4
Gustavus Adolphus	2

National Championship; March 3
Lake Superior State	4
Bemidji State	1
Third place
Gustavus Adolphus	6
St. Thomas	5

Note: * denotes overtime period(s)
