= 1968 NAIA ice hockey championship =

1968 NAIA Ice Hockey Championship
- 1968

Tournament information
- Sport: ice hockey
- Location: St. Paul, Minnesota
- Dates: March 8, 1968–March 9, 1968
- Venue: St. Paul Auditorium
- Teams: 4

Final positions
- Champion: Bemidji State
- Runner-up: Lake Superior State

Tournament statistics
- Winning coach: Bob Peters

The 1968 NAIA Men's Ice Hockey Tournament involved four schools playing in single-elimination bracket to determine the national champion of men's NAIA college ice hockey. The 1968 tournament was the first men's ice hockey tournament to be sponsored by the NAIA. The tournament began on March 8, 1968, and ended with the championship game on March 9.

The championship game pitted ICHA conference rivals Bemidji State College (BSC) and Lake Superior State College (LSSC) against each other. Despite LSSC taking all four regular season games against BSC, the Beavers earned their first National Title with a 5-4 overtime victory over the Lakers.

== Brackets ==
St. Paul Auditorium, St. Paul, Minnesota

Semifinals; March 8
Bemidji State	11
Boston State	0
Lake Superior State	7
Gustavus Adolphus	1

National Championship; March 9
Bemidji State	5*
Lake Superior State	4
Third Place Game
Gustavus Adolphus	7
Boston State	6

Note: * denotes overtime period(s)
