= 1973 NAIA ice hockey championship =

1973 NAIA Ice Hockey Championship
- 1973

Tournament information
- Sport: ice hockey
- Location: Lakehead, Ontario
- Dates: March 1, 1973–March 3, 1973
- Venue: Fort William Gardens
- Teams: 6

Final positions
- Champion: Bemidji State
- Runner-up: Lakehead University

Tournament statistics
- Winning coach: Bob Peters

The 1973 NAIA Men's Ice Hockey Tournament involved six schools playing in single-elimination bracket to determine the national champion of men's NAIA college ice hockey. The 1973 tournament was the sixth men's ice hockey tournament to be sponsored by the NAIA. The tournament began on March 1, 1973, and ended with the championship game on March 3.

The 1973 tournament expanded the field from four to six teams. Gustavus Adolphus attended the tournament for the sixth straight year while Bemidji State and Lake Superior State each made the tournament for the fifth time. Boston State, Augsburg, and Lakehead all made the tournament for the second time. Lakehead hosted the tournament, bringing the NAIA championship tournament to Ontario for the first time. In a rematch of the 1971 championship, both Bemidji State and host Lakehead made their way through the expanded field to reach the title game. The Beavers defeated Lakehead 3-2 in overtime to win the program's fifth title.

== Bracket ==
Fort William Gardens, Lakehead, Ontario

First Round; March 1
Bemidji State	8
Boston State	1
Lakehead University	8
Augsburg	7

Semifinals; March 2
3	Bemidji State	6
2	Gustavus Adolphus	3
4	Lakehead	8
1	Lake Superior State	4

National Championship; March 3
3	Bemidji State	3*
4	Lakehead	2
Third place
Lake Superior State	11
Gustavus Adolphus	3

Note: * denotes overtime period(s)
