= NAIA ice hockey championship =

College ice hockey tournament

The National Association of Intercollegiate Athletics (NAIA) held a men's national ice hockey championship from 1968 to 1984, when ice hockey was dropped as an NAIA sport.

== Early history ==
The NAIA Men's Ice Hockey Championship held a single elimination competition to determined the collegiate national champion from the inaugural 1968 to 1984. The tournament began as a four-team tournament but expanded to six and eight teams during the peak time-frame during the 1970s and early 1980s. The tournament returned to the 4-team format for the final two seasons with declining hockey participation at the NAIA level. In total, the NAIA sponsored men's ice hockey as a championship sport for 17 years. The schools were consolidated in the Northern United States and the tournament field primarily consisted between schools in Michigan, Minnesota, and Wisconsin, with occasional contenders from New England and Alaska. NAIA ice hockey also had an international presence in the early years of the championship with membership in Ontario. In total, ice hockey at the NAIA level consisted of between 30 and 50 schools. It was discontinued in 1984 after the NCAA created a Division III national championship.

=== Tournament format history ===
1968–1972
4 teams (single elimination)

1973–1974
6 teams (single elimination)

1975–1982
8 teams (single elimination)

1983-1984
4 teams (single elimination)

== Winners of the NAIA national ice hockey championship ==
Year	Champion	Score	Runner-up
1968	Bemidji State	5-4 (ot)	Lake Superior State
1969	Bemidji State	6-2	Lake Superior State
1970	Bemidji State	7-4	Lake Superior State
1971	Bemidji State	6-2	Lakehead
1972	Lake Superior State	9-3	Gustavus Adolphus
1973	Bemidji State	3-2 (ot)	Lakehead
1974	Lake Superior State	4-1	Bemidji State
1975	St. Scholastica	7-1	Gustavus Adolphus
1976	Wisconsin–Superior	8-5	St. Scholastica
1977	St. Scholastica	3-2	Gustavus Adolphus
1978	Augsburg	4-3	Bemidji State
1979	Bemidji State	5-1	Concordia Moorhead
1980	Bemidji State	4-3	Michigan–Dearborn
1981	Augsburg	8-3	Wisconsin–Superior
1982	Augsburg	6-3	Bemidji State
1983	Wisconsin–River Falls	12-5	Michigan–Dearborn
1984	Wisconsin–Eau Claire	6-1	Michigan–Dearborn

== Recent history ==
During the summer of 2015, a group of schools fielding the sport began working with the NAIA administrators in an effort to gain emerging sport status and work to eventually sponsoring the sport at the championship level again. The NAIA requires a minimum of 15 schools to sponsor a sport at the varsity level to begin the process from emerging to championship categories.

In 2016, several NAIA institutions that sponsor men's ice hockey teams announced the formation of a coaches association and a new division for NAIA ice hockey program to begin play during the 2017–18 season. The division will initially operate under the guidance of the American Collegiate Hockey Association (ACHA) during the emerging sport phase of the process to regain NAIA championship sport status. The new division will allow these NAIA schools to align their standards with the institution's other NAIA sports, including distinct differences from the other ACHA divisions in terms of player eligibility, operational procedures, and athletic financial aid.

The Wolverine–Hoosier Athletic Conference (WHAC) made history in July 2017, by adding men's ice hockey as conference sports effective the fall of 2017. The WHAC became the first conference in the NAIA to offer the sport as a conference championship sport. Initially, the five conference members that sponsor ice hockey will participate in a conference championship. In July 2017, Concordia University Ann Arbor announced that the university will begin an ice hockey program and begin competition in the NAIA Division and WHAC Hockey Conference in the 2018–19 season.

In April 2020, Roosevelt University began to sponsor men's ice hockey after inheriting Robert Morris University's men's team and its ACHA membership because Robert Morris was integrated into Roosevelt a month before.

=== Current WHAC men's ice hockey teams ===
Institution	Location	Enrollment	Nickname	Hockey Conference Affiliation
Aquinas College	Grand Rapids, Michigan	2,100	Saints	Wolverine–Hoosier
Cleary University	Howell, Michigan	600	Cougars	Wolverine–Hoosier
Concordia University Ann Arbor	Ann Arbor, Michigan	1,200	Cardinals	Wolverine–Hoosier
Indiana Institute of Technology	Fort Wayne, Indiana	3,500	Warriors	Wolverine–Hoosier
Lawrence Technological University	Southfield, Michigan	4,000	Blue Devils	Wolverine–Hoosier
Rochester Christian University	Rochester Hills, Michigan	1,084	Warriors	Wolverine–Hoosier
University of Michigan–Dearborn	Dearborn, Michigan	9,500	Wolverines	Wolverine–Hoosier

=== Other NAIA schools fielding hockey teams ===
Institution	Location	Enrollment	Nickname	Current Hockey Affiliation
University of British Columbia	Vancouver, British Columbia	50,304	Thunderbirds	U Sports
Carroll College	Helena, Montana	1,502	Fighting Saints	ACHA
Dordt College	Sioux Center, Iowa	1,300	Defenders	ACHA
University of Jamestown	Jamestown, North Dakota	967	Jimmies	ACHA
Midland University	Fremont, Nebraska	1,400	Warriors	ACHA
Montana Tech	Butte, Montana	2,694	Orediggers	ACHA
Roosevelt University	Chicago, Illinois	7,500	Lakers	ACHA
St. Ambrose University	Davenport, Iowa	3,607	Fighting Bees	Independent club
University of Providence	Great Falls, Montana	1,100	Argonauts	ACHA
University of Victoria	Victoria, British Columbia	16,961	Vikes	BCIHL
Waldorf University	Forest City, Iowa	600	Warriors	ACHA
