= International Collegiate Hockey Association =

The International Collegiate Hockey Association (ICHA) was an intercollegiate ice hockey conference from 1965-80 competing in the National Association of Intercollegiate Athletics (NAIA). The conference had member schools in both Canada and the United States.

== History ==
The league was founded in 1965 with member schools Bemidji State University, Lake Superior State University, Lakehead University, St. Cloud State University, and University of Wisconsin-Superior.

St. Cloud State dropped out of the league after four seasons in April 1969 due to lack of an indoor facility.

In 1972-73, Lake Superior State played in both the ICHA and Central Collegiate Hockey Association (CCHA). In 1973, LSSU left the ICHA for the CCHA. The following season, the Lakers left the NAIA to become an NCAA Division I ice hockey program.

LSSU was replaced by the College of St. Scholastica starting in the 1972-73 season.

Lakehead left the ICHA after the 1976-77 season.

== Decline and Disbandment ==
Following the departure of Lakehead, the ICHA made an attempt to add former member St. Cloud State plus Mankato State, Wisconsin-River Falls, and Wisconsin-Stout. Another proposal of the ICHA was to join the Minnesota Intercollegiate Athletic Conference for hockey only, which would have brought that league's hockey membership to 10 teams. Neither plan came to fruition.

St. Scholastica left the conference following the 1977-78 season leaving the ICHA with just two members.

On June 1, 1980, Bemidji State and Wisconsin-Superior joined Mankato State University, St. Cloud State University, Wisconsin-Eau Claire, and Wisconsin-River Falls to form the Northern Collegiate Hockey Association.

== Conference Champions ==
- 1967 Bemidji State/Lakehead University
- 1968 Lake Superior State
- 1969 Bemidji State
- 1970 Bemidji State/Lake Superior State
- 1971 Bemidji State
- 1972 Lake Superior State
- 1973 Bemidji State/Lake Superior State
- 1974 Bemidji State
- 1975 St. Scholastica
- 1976 Bemidji State
- 1977 Bemidji State
- 1978 Bemidji State
- 1979 Bemidji State
- 1980 Bemidji State

== National Championships ==
The ICHA dominated the NAIA ice hockey tournament winning 12 of 13 national titles from 1968-80. All 13 championship games featured at least one ICHA team. Seven championships were an inter-conference match-up.

=== NAIA National Champions ===
Year	Champion
1968	Bemidji State
1969	Bemidji State
1970	Bemidji State
1971	Bemidji State
1972	Lake Superior State
1973	Bemidji State
1974	Lake Superior State
1975	St. Scholastica
1976	Wisconsin–Superior
1977	St. Scholastica
1979	Bemidji State
1980	Bemidji State
