= Bob Peters =

Canadian ice hockey coach (1937–2021)

Biographical details
- Born: October 6, 1937; Fort Frances, Ontario, Canada
- Died: December 14, 2021 (aged 84); Bemidji, Minnesota, U.S.

Playing career
- 1957–1958: North Dakota
- Position: Goaltender

Coaching career (HC unless noted)
- 1961–1964: North Dakota (assistant)
- 1964–1966: North Dakota
- 1966–2001: Bemidji State

Head coaching record
- Overall: 744–313–50 (.695)

Accomplishments and honors

Championships
- 1963 NCAA National Champion (assistant); 1965 WCHA regular season champion 1967 ICHA regular season champion 1968 NAIA National Champion; 1969 ICHA regular season champion 1969 NAIA national champion 1970 ICHA regular season champion 1970 NAIA national champion 1971 ICHA regular season champion 1971 NAIA national champion 1973 ICHA regular season champion 1973 NAIA national champion 1974 ICHA regular season champion 1976 ICHA regular season champion 1977 ICHA regular season champion 1978 ICHA regular season champion 1979 NAIA national champion 1980 NAIA national champion 1982 NCHA regular season champion 1984 NCHA regular season champion 1984 NCAA national champion (D-II); 1985 NCHA regular season champion 1986 NCHA regular season champion 1986 NCHA tournament champion 1986 NCAA national champion (D-III); 1987 NCHA tournament champion 1991 NCHA regular season champion 1993 NCAA national champion (D-II); 1994 NCAA national champion (D-II); 1995 NCHA regular season champion 1995 NCHA tournament champion 1995 NCAA national champion (D-II); 1997 NCAA national champion (D-II)

Awards
- 1984 Edward Jeremiah Award

Robert H. Peters (October 6, 1937 – December 14, 2021) was a Canadian men's ice hockey coach. He was the head coach of the Bemidji State University ice hockey team from 1967 to 2001. With 702 wins, he ranks fifth all-time in career wins by a men's college ice hockey coach.

== Coaching history ==
Peters entered the college hockey head coaching ranks in 1964 as bench boss at the University of North Dakota. During his initial campaign, Peters, the eventual Western Collegiate Hockey Association Coach of the Year, led the Fighting Sioux to a WCHA title and a third-place finish at the NCAA Championships. He coached in Grand Forks for two seasons, leading the Sioux to a 42–20–1 mark before making a career decision that would change the face of collegiate hockey.

Peters left the Division I powerhouse in 1966 and took over at Bemidji State University. Within two seasons Peters led BSU to its first national championship and set the foundation for what would become one of the most dominant programs in college hockey.

Thirty-five years later, Peters retired from coaching with one of the most impressive lists of achievements in the history of collegiate sports: 744 victories as a head coach, 702 coming at Bemidji State alone, to make Peters the first coach to win 700 or more games at a single school; 13 small-college national championships; and still-standing national collegiate records for most wins in an unbeaten season (31–0–0 in 1983–'84) and longest unbeaten streak (43 games from Nov. 8, 1983 to Jan. 1, 1985).

Peters, the only coach to lead a team to a national championship game in three divisions of college hockey and the only coach to reach the Final Four in all four divisions (Division I, II, III and NAIA), developed five NHL players and numerous Olympians and All-Americans.

A 1960 graduate of the University of North Dakota, Peters spent his collegiate days at goaltender for the Fighting Sioux. He coached at the high school level for one season before rejoining the UND staff as an assistant coach.

== CHA commissioner ==
Retired from coaching, Peters remained heavily involved in the sport of college hockey. In 2001 he became the commissioner of the College Hockey America (CHA) conference.

In addition to appointing Peters CHA Commissioner, the athletic directors of the league's member institutions approved the recommendation by the coaches to name the regular-season championship trophy in honor of Peters as the R.H. "Bob" Peters Cup.

== Contributions to college hockey ==
Peters' influence on college hockey also has stretched outside the arena. He has proven his administrative skills at Bemidji State by serving as athletic director and head hockey coach, and he lent service to several committees. Under Peters' guidance, BSU hockey progressed from NAIA to NCAA Division III to NCAA Division II, and in 1999, BSU elevated its hockey program to Division I. He served on championship committees for the NAIA and NCAA for over 20 years, and in 2001 was named a Hobey Baker Legend of Hockey.

== Personal life ==
Peters died in Bemidji, Minnesota on December 14, 2021, at the age of 84.

== Career statistics ==
Season	Team	League	GP	W	L	T	Min	GA	SO	GAA	SV%
1957–58	North Dakota	NCAA	11	9	1	1	660	14	2	1.27	.927

== Head coaching record ==
Record table
Season	Team	Overall	Conference	Standing	Postseason
North Dakota Fighting Sioux (WCHA) (1964–1966)
1964–65	North Dakota	25–8–0	13–3–0	1st	NCAA consolation game (win)
1965–66	North Dakota	17–12–1	13–9–1	2nd	WCHA second round
North Dakota:		42–20–1	26–12–1		
Bemidji State Beavers (ICHA) (1966–1978)
1966–67	Bemidji State	13–5–1	10–2–0	t-1st	
1967–68	Bemidji State	16–8–0	6–6–0	–	NAIA national champion
1968–69	Bemidji State	23–2–0	11–1–0	1st	NAIA national champion
1969–70	Bemidji State	24–3–0	10–2–0	1st	NAIA national champion
1970–71	Bemidji State	20–7–1	10–1–1	1st	NAIA national champion
1971–72	Bemidji State	13–12–1	5–6–1	–	
1972–73	Bemidji State	23–6–1	8–4–0	t-1st	NAIA national champion
1973–74	Bemidji State	20–10–1	9–3–0	1st	NAIA runner-up
1974–75	Bemidji State	13–15–0	2–10–0	–	
1975–76	Bemidji State	22–9–0	8–4–0	1st	
1976–77	Bemidji State	24–4–3	9–3–2	1st	
1977–78	Bemidji State	25–5–1	11–3–0	1st	NAIA runner-up
Bemidji State:		236–86–9	99–45–4		
Bemidji State Beavers (NAIA Independent) (1978–1980)
1978–79	Bemidji State	27–2–0			NAIA national champion
1979–80	Bemidji State	24–8–0			NAIA national champion
Bemidji State:		51–10–0			
Bemidji State Beavers (NCHA) (1980–1982)
1980–81	Bemidji State	24–7–0	8–4–0	–	
1981–82	Bemidji State	25–5–1	16–3–1	1st	NAIA runner-up
Bemidji State:		222–68–9	129–42–7		
Bemidji State Beavers (NCHA (D-II)) (1983–1984)
1983–84	Bemidji State	31–0–0	18–0–0	1st	NCAA national champion
Bemidji State:		31–0–0	18–0–0		
Bemidji State Beavers (NCHA (D-III)) (1984–1992)
1984–85	Bemidji State	27–6–2	14–3–1	1st	NCAA runner-up
1985–86	Bemidji State	25–9–1	12–6–0	t-1st	NCAA national champion
1986–87	Bemidji State	22–12–1	12–7–1	3rd	NCAA Frozen Four
1987–88	Bemidji State	24–11–3	15–6–3	2nd	NCAA Frozen Four
1988–89	Bemidji State	19–13–4	11–8–1	3rd	NCAA Frozen Four
1989–90	Bemidji State	15–11–2	11–11–2	5th	
1990–91	Bemidji State	21–6–3	17–4–3	t-1st	
1991–92	Bemidji State	16–9–5	9–8–3	4th	
Bemidji State:		169–77–21	101–53–15		
Bemidji State Beavers (NCHA (D-II)) (1992–1999)
1992–93	Bemidji State	24–7–0	14–6–0	2nd	NCAA national champion
1993–94	Bemidji State	21–9–3	12–6–2	3rd	NCAA national champion
1994–95	Bemidji State	24–7–2	16–3–1	1st	NCAA national champion
1995–96	Bemidji State	16–9–4	13–5–2	2nd	NCAA runner-up
1996–97	Bemidji State	25–7–2	14–5–1	2nd	NCAA national champion
1997–98	Bemidji State	22–10–2	14–6–0	3rd	NCAA runner-up
1998–99	Bemidji State	17–13–0	10–6–0	3rd	
Bemidji State:		149–62–13	93–37–6		
Bemidji State Beavers (CHA) (1999–2001)
1999–00	Bemidji State	13–20–1	8–8–1	3rd	CHA third-place game (win)
2000–01	Bemidji State	4–26–4	4–12–3	6th	
Bemidji State:		17–46–5	12–20–4		
Total:		744–313–50			
National champion Postseason invitational champion Conference regular season champion Conference regular season and conference tournament champion Division regular season champion Division regular season and conference tournament champion Conference tournament champion

== See also ==
- List of college men's ice hockey coaches with 400 wins

Sporting positions
Preceded by Barry Thorndycraft	Head coach of the University of North Dakota; 1964–1966	Succeeded by Bill Selman
Preceded by Wayne Peterson	Head coach of Bemidji State University; 1966–2001	Succeeded by Mike Gibbons
Awards and achievements
Preceded by Al Renfrew	WCHA Coach of the Year; 1964–65	Succeeded by John MacInnes
Preceded by Mike Gibbons/Peter Van Buskirk	Edward Jeremiah Award; 1983–84	Succeeded by Rob Riley
Preceded by Bob Johnson	Hobey Baker Legends of College Hockey Award; 2001	Succeeded by Sid Watson
