= Wessman Arena =

Arena in Superior, Wisconsin, U.S.

Siinto S. Wessman Arena
- "Wessman Arena"
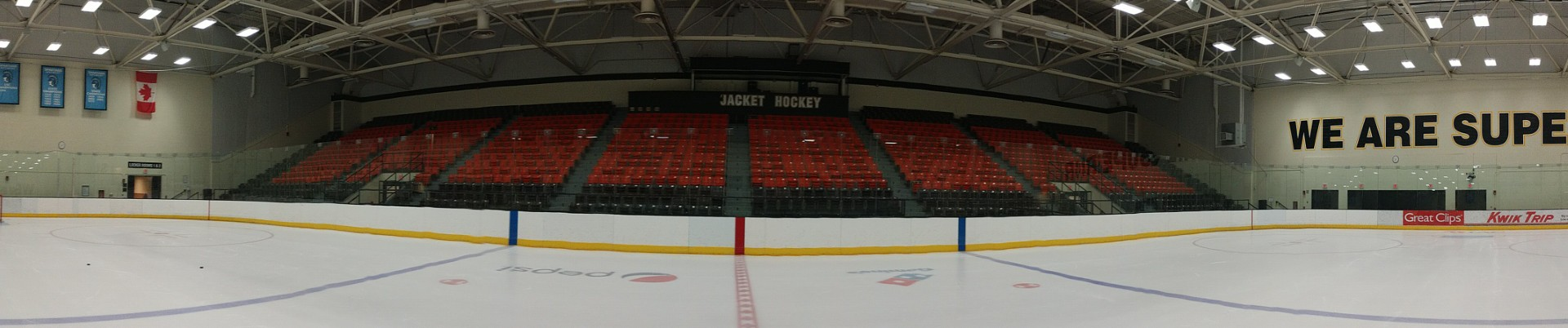
- Interactive map of Siinto S. Wessman Arena
- Location: 2701 Catlin Ave; Superior, Wisconsin, US
- Coordinates: 46.707400°N 92.088628°W
- Operator: University of Wisconsin-Superior
- Capacity: 1,550
- Surface: Ice
- Public transit: Duluth Transit Authority

Construction
- Opened: 1970

Tenants
- Wisconsin-Superior Yellowjacket men's ice hockey (NCAA) (1970–present); Wisconsin-Superior Yellowjacket women's ice hockey (NCAA) (1999–present); Superior High School (High School) (1970-Present)

Wessman Arena is an indoor ice hockey arena located on the campus of the University of Wisconsin–Superior in Superior, Wisconsin, United States. Opened in 1970, it serves as the home venue for the Wisconsin–Superior Yellowjackets men's and women's hockey teams as well as the Superior High School Spartans.

Siinto S. Wessman was a former regent and longtime University of Wisconsin-Superior booster. The campus ice arena was named in his honor after its completion in 1970 at a ceremony before the first game.

In 2023, the university announced "The Superior Plan", which includes adding facilities at the northern and southern ends of campus to create a recreation corridor along Catlin Avenue, with Wessman arena being the marquee venue at the southern end of the road. The plan calls for creating two new sheets of indoor ice near Wessman Arena that could serve the university, high school and Superior Amateur Hockey Association. This would be new sheets of ice with limited seating with renovations coming to Wessman Arena itself to maintain its ability to host NCAA games.

The arena also serves as an event center and concert venue in the summer months, as well as graduation ceremonies. The arena also plays host to professional wrestling and Mixed Martial Arts fights. Wessman Arena was also the host of the Superior-Douglas County Athletic Hall of Fame until major renovations took place in 2010.

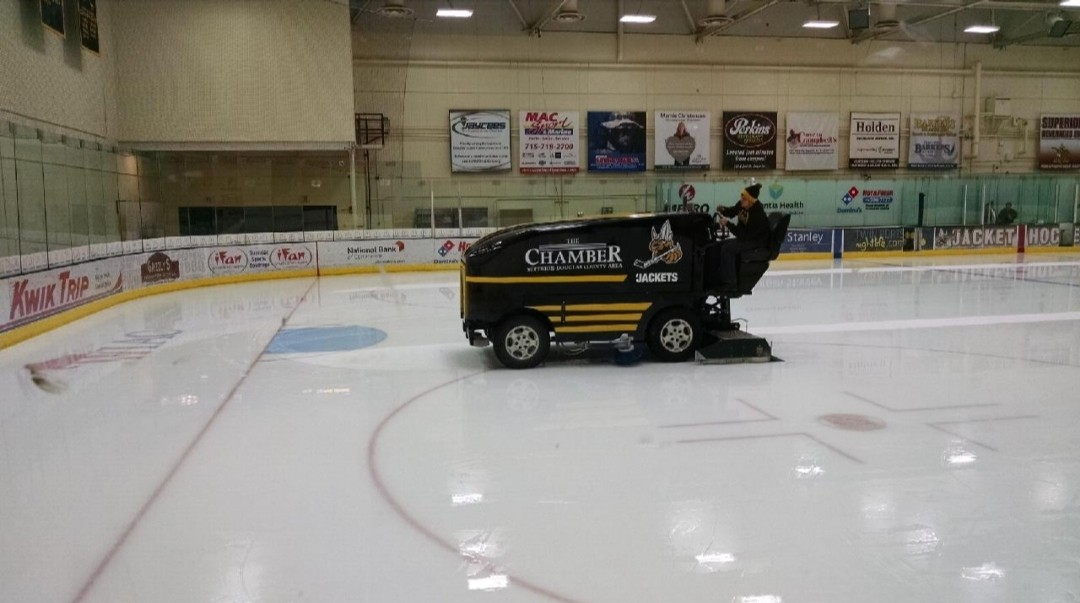
In between periods at Wessman Arena during a Yellowjacket women's game

Wessman Arena served as the site of the 1994, 2000 and 2007 NCAA Division III Men's Hockey Championships as well as the 2013 NCAA Division III Women's Ice Hockey Championship.

Some of the more famous musicians to have performed at Wessman Arena include:

- 38 Special (2019)
- Jon Pardi (2017)
- Tech N9ne (2015)
- Sevendust (2001, 2002, and 2006)
- Drowning Pool (2001)
- Hoodie Allen (2014)
- SOiL (2002)
