= Bemidji State Beavers men's ice hockey =

- Current season
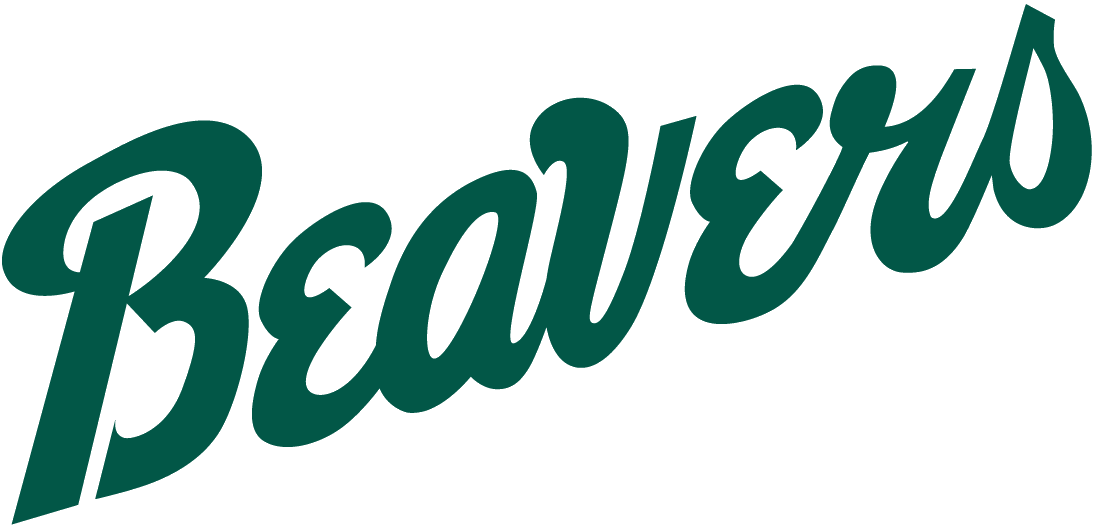
- University: Bemidji State University
- Conference: CCHA
- First season: 1947–48
- Head coach: Tom Serratore; 26th season, 416–397–108 (.510)
- Assistant coaches: Travis Winter; Joe Wegwerth; Jackson Keane
- Arena: Sanford Center; Bemidji, Minnesota
- Colors: Green and white

NCAA tournament champions
- DII: 1984, 1993, 1994, 1995, 1997; DIII: 1986

NCAA tournament Frozen Four
- DI: 2009; DII: 1983, 1984, 1993, 1994, 1995, 1996, 1997, 1998; DIII: 1985, 1986, 1987, 1988, 1989

NCAA tournament appearances
- DI: 2005, 2006, 2009, 2010, 2021; DII: 1983, 1984, 1993, 1994, 1995, 1996, 1997, 1998; DIII: 1985, 1986, 1987, 1988, 1989

NAIA tournament champions
- 1968, 1969, 1970, 1971, 1973, 1979, 1980

Conference tournament champions
- WIHA: 1983, 1985; NCHA: 1986, 1987, 1995; CHA: 2005, 2006, 2009

Conference regular season champions
- ICHA: 1967, 1969, 1970, 1971, 1973, 1974, 1976, 1977, 1978; NCHA: 1981, 1982, 1983, 1984, 1985, 1986, 1991, 1995; CHA: 2004, 2005, 2008, 2009, 2010; WCHA: 2017; CCHA: 2024

Current uniform

The Bemidji State Beavers men's ice hockey team is a National Collegiate Athletic Association (NCAA) Division I college ice hockey program that represents Bemidji State University. The Beavers are a member of the Central Collegiate Hockey Association and play at Sanford Center in Bemidji, Minnesota, as of the 2010 season, after previously playing at the John S. Glas Field House.

== History ==
=== Early history ===
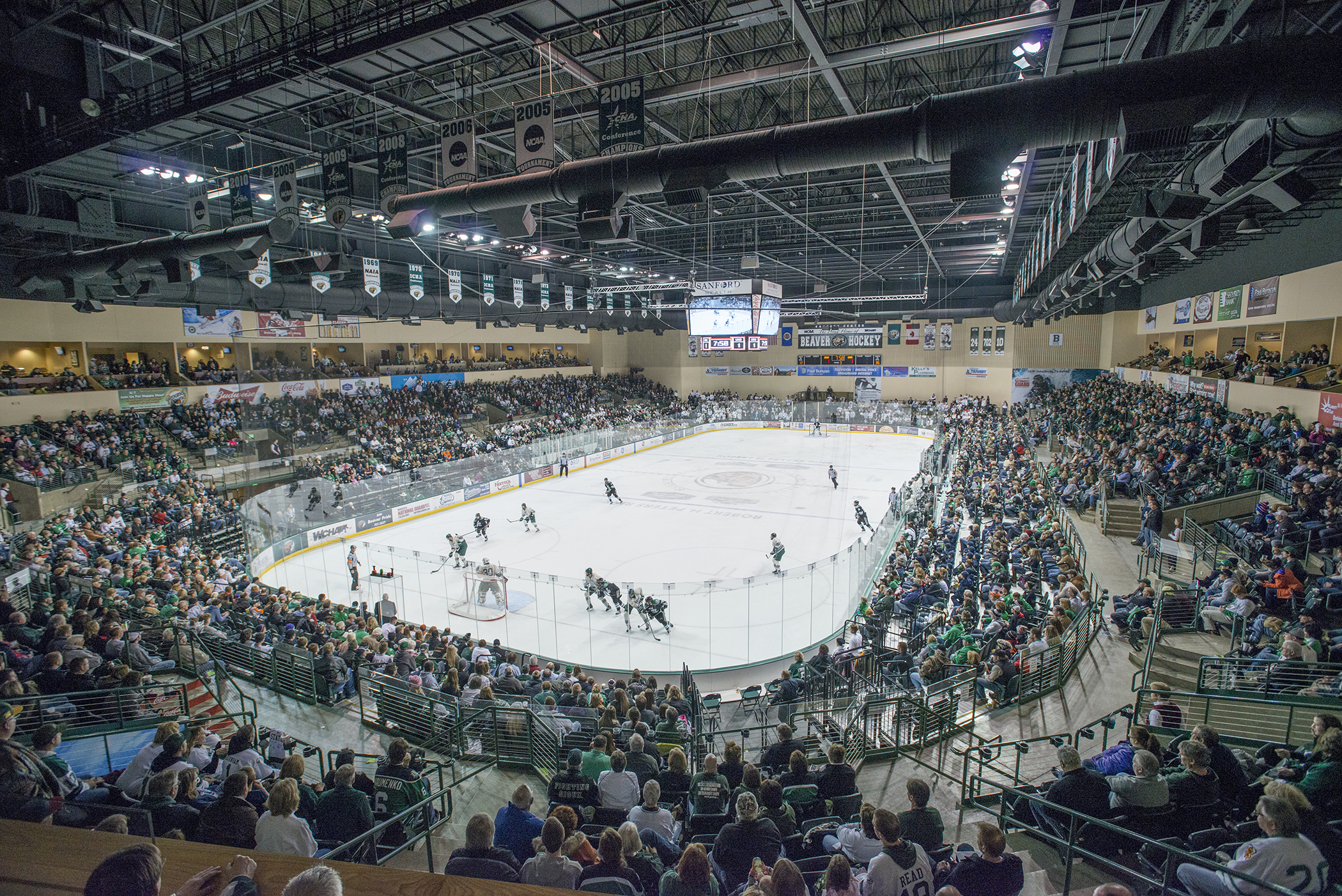
Bemidji State Hockey Arena - Sanford Center

The Bemidji State men's ice hockey program began in 1946. From the inaugural 1946-47 season through the 1966-67 season BSU played as an independent member of Division I. In 1968 the team became a member of the National Association of Intercollegiate Athletics (NAIA). The program continued to operate as an independent member, now in the NAIA from 1968-69 through the 1979-80 season. For the 1980-81 season the program joined the Northern Collegiate Hockey Association (NCHA), in which Bemidji State is a charter member. BSU won the 1981–82 and 1982-83 NCHA regular season championships. Following the 1982-83 season BSU moved to NCAA Division II remaining in the NCHA. During the program's 16-season tenure in the NAIA the team won NAIA national ice hockey championships 7 times, including the first NAIA Championship in 1968.

The Beavers won their third straight NCHA regular season championship in 1983-84 and qualified for the NCAA tournament. In the 1984 tournament BSU won its first NCAA title at the Division II level with BSU sweeping Merrimack in a best-of-three series winning 6-3 and 8-1. Beginning in the following season, the Division II tournament was combined with the NCAA Division III level. The Beavers won the NCHA regular season championship for the third straight season and qualified for the school's first NCAA Division III ice hockey championship. BSU came in second after a 1-5 loss in the finals to RIT. Bemidji State won the first ever NCHA playoff tournament at the conclusion of the 1985-86 season and continued momentum into the NCAA DIII tournament winning the Division III Championship in an 8-5 win over Plattsburgh State. BSU made the NCAA Division III tournament three more times in the 1980s, 1987-1989 but finished fourth once and third twice. The Division II Ice Hockey Tournament was reinstated beginning in 1992-93 season and BSU won The Division II championship three straight years 1993-1995. In the 1996 championship the Beavers came up short to Alabama-Huntsville. The following season Alabama-Huntsville would get revenge, beating Bemidji State in the 1998 championship game. That would be the last year BSU participated in the DII tournament, the Beavers failed to qualify for the last NCAA DII Tournament in 1999 and the following season the Beavers moved to NCAA Division I level.

=== Recent history ===
==== CHA era ====
Bemidji State joined two other former Division II ice hockey members Alabama–Huntsville and Findlay along with former DI independent teams Air Force, Army, and Niagara and expansion program Wayne State to form College Hockey America at the Division I level after the NCAA ended sponsorship of a Division II ice hockey tournament due to lack of membership. Ted Belisle joined the coaching team as an assistant, and BSU won their first CHA regular season championship in the 2003-04 season but lost 2004 CHA Championship and an automatic bid to the NCAA Tournament in overtime 3-4 to (#2) Niagara.

The 2004-05 marked a historic season for the BSU hockey program. The team swept through the CHA winning the CHA regular season championship and winning the 2005 CHA Championship over Alabama-Huntsville. The 3-0 shutout win gave the Beavers their first berth in the NCAA Division I Ice Hockey Tournament in program history. the team came close to a major upset, losing 3-4 in overtime to the #1 ranked Denver in the opening round. Bemidji beat Niagara 4-2 to win the 2006 CHA Championship and advance to the 2006 NCAA Division I Men's Ice Hockey Tournament for the second year in a row. BSU again lost in the opening round, this time to Wisconsin 0-4.

The 2008-09 season was the most successful season the team has had at the Division I level. The Beavers finished the regular season 1st in the CHA with a record of 12-5-1 and won the 2009 CHA Championship in 3-2 in overtime over Robert Morris. The team picked up the first NCAA Division I tournament win in the 2009 NCAA Division I Men's Ice Hockey Tournament with a 5-1 upset over Notre Dame Fighting Irish men's ice hockey, a #1 seed and ranked 2nd in the national rankings. The Beavers advanced for the first time in the Division I tournament and beat Cornell 4-1 to advance to the school's first ever Frozen Four held at the Verizon Center in Washington D.C. Bemidji faced Miami (Ohio) in the National Semifinal game with a 1-4 loss to the RedHawks.

==== WCHA era ====
In addition to the on-ice success, in 2008 Bemidji began exploring options to strengthen the program. The CHA had lost many of the original member to programs at Findlay and Wayne State folding and other teams transferring to other college hockey conferences. Travel expenses to remaining members in Huntsville, Alabama, and Western New York and Pennsylvania was also a concern. BSU began looking at the Western Collegiate Hockey Association (WCHA) as a solution. In a first step the university signed a scheduling agreement against WCHA schools, many within a few hours drive to Bemidji, Minnesota. Other than the WCHA BSU's only option was to end the historic program. In 2009 it was announced the university and city of Bemidji would build a 4,000-5,000 seat state-of-the-art arena to meet WCHA requirements, that the 2,400-seat John S. Glas Field House did not meet. With the news of the Bemidji Regional Events Center BSU applied to join the Western Collegiate Hockey Association in early 2009. Bemidji State along with University of Nebraska-Omaha (transferring from the CCHA) was accepted into the WCHA as the 11th and 12th members. BSU officially became a member on July 1, 2010.

The Beavers opened WCHA play in the new Bemidji Regional Events Center on October 15, 2010 against North Dakota in a 2-5 loss. Bemidji picked up their first WCHA win at St. Cloud State 3-2 in overtime. Bemidji ended the regular season with a conference record of 8-15-5 as the 10th seed entering the 2011 WCHA Tournament. In the first round of the WCHA playoffs the Beaver beat 3rd-seeded Nebraska-Omaha two games to none with 4-3 and 4-2 wins. The series sweep sent Bemidji to its first ever WCHA Final Five and upset Minnesota–Duluth 3-2 in overtime, before losing to Denver 2-6 in the semifinal game.
With a WCHA Conference record of 20 wins, 6 losses, and 2 ties, The Bemidji State Beavers became WCHA Regular Season Champions at the conclusion of the 2016-2017 season. They compiled 64 conference points, 10 more than runner-up Michigan Tech, and won the school's first coveted MacNaughton Cup.

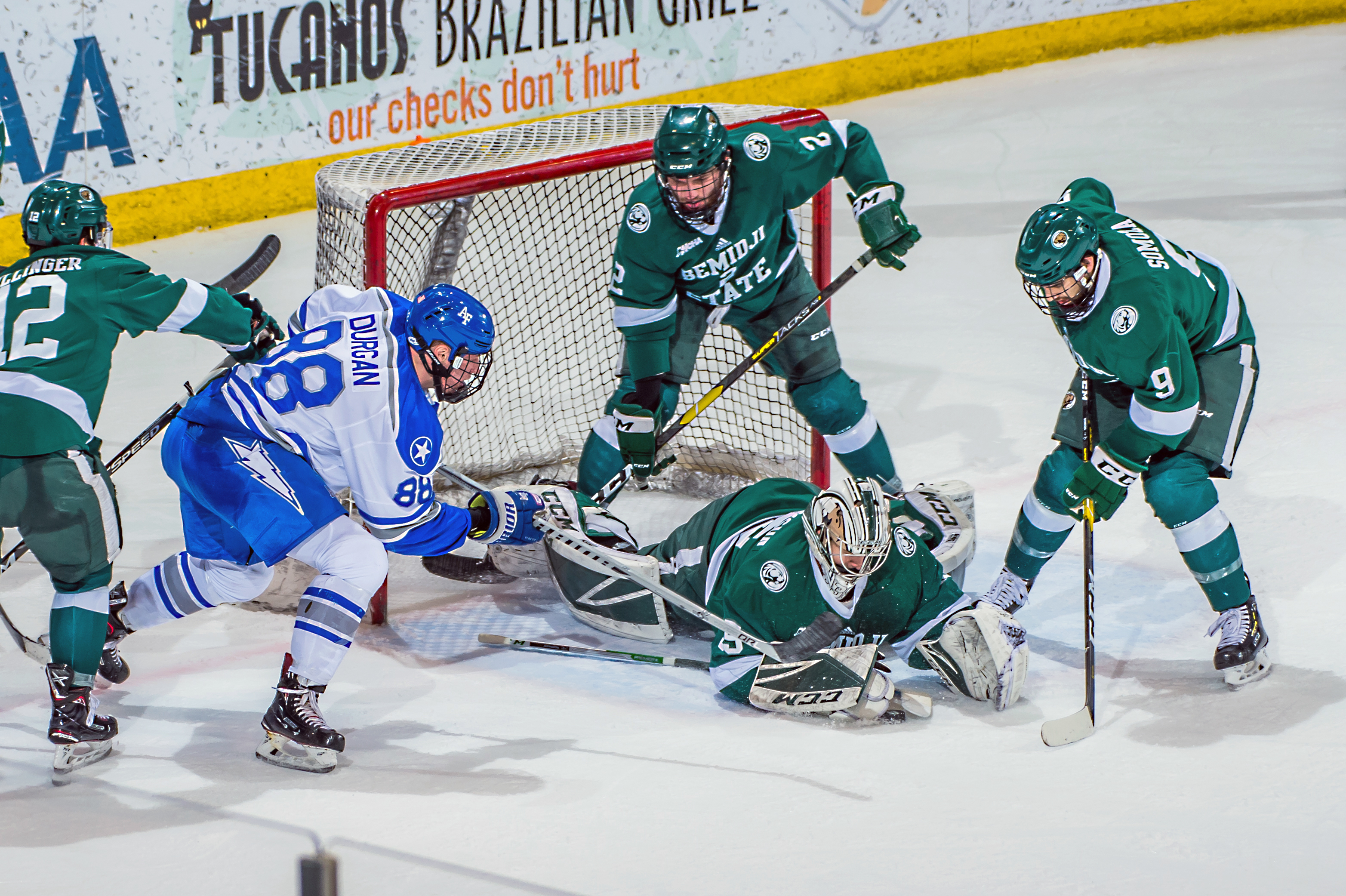
The Bemidji State men's ice hockey team plays against Air Force in 2018

==== CCHA era ====
Bemidji State was one of the seven WCHA members that jointly announced in 2019 that they would leave that league after the 2020–21 season. These seven schools announced in early 2020 that they would reestablish the CCHA, and added an eighth member before starting play in the revived league in 2021.

The Beavers claimed their first CCHA regular season championship and second MacNaughton Cup at the conclusion of the 2023-2024 season.

== All-time coaching records ==
As of the end of the 2025–26 season.

Tenure	Coach	Years	Record	Pct.
1947–1948	Jack Aldrich	1	2–8–0	.200
1948–1950	Eric Hughes	2	17–13–0	.567
1959–1964, 1965–1966	Vic Weber	6	42–19–2	.683
1964–1965	Wayne Peterson	1	10–1–1	.875
1966–1982, 1983–2001	Bob Peters	34	702–293–49	.696
1982–1983	Mike Gibbons	1	30–6–1	.824
2001–Present	Tom Serratore	25	416–397–108	.510
Totals	7 coaches	70 seasons	1219–737–161	.614

== Awards ==
=== NCAA ===
==== Individual awards ====
Senior CLASS Award

- Brendan Harms (2017)

==== All-Americans ====
Second Team

- 2009–10: Matt Read, F

=== CHA ===
==== Individual awards ====
Player of the Year

- Andrew Murray (2005)
- Matt Read (2010)

Rookie of the Year

- Riley Riddell (2002)
- Luke Erickson (2004)
- Matt Read (2008)
- Brad Hunt (2009)
- Jordan George (2010)

Student-Athlete of the Year

- Andrew Murray (2005)
- Kyle Hardwick (2010)

Coach of the Year

- Tom Serratore (2004, 2005, 2008, 2009, 2010)

Most Valuable Player in Tournament

- Matt Climie (2005)
- Jean-Guy Gervais (2006)
- Matt Read (2009)

==== All-CHA Teams ====
First Team

- 1999–00: Stefan Bjork, D
- 2001–02: Marty Goulet, F
- 2002–03: Grady Hunt, G; Bryce Methven, D; Marty Goulet, F
- 2003–04: Bryce Methven, D; Brendan Cook, F
- 2004–05: Peter Jonsson, D; Andrew Murray, F
- 2005–06: Andrew Martens, D; Luke Erickson, F
- 2006–07: Matt Climie, G; Travis Wright, F
- 2007–08: Cody Bostock, D
- 2008–09: Brad Hunt, D; Matt Read, F
- 2009–10: Dan Bakala, G; Brad Hunt, D; Matt Read, F

Second Team

- 1999–00: Calvin Chartrand, F
- 2000–01: Clay Simmons, D
- 2001–02: Grady Hunt, G; Riley Riddell, F
- 2003–04: Grady Hunt, G; Peter Jonsson, D; Riley Riddell, F
- 2004–05: Brendan Cook, F
- 2007–08: Matt Climie, G; Travis Wright, F
- 2008–09: Matt Dalton, G; Cody Bostock, D; Tyler Scofield, F
- 2009–10: Ian Lowe, F

Rookie Team

- 1999–00: Bob Tallarico, G; Clay Simmons, D; Rico Faticci, D; Daryl Bat, F; Brad Johnson, F
- 2000–01: Bryce Methven, D
- 2001–02: Anders Olsson, D; Andrew Murray, F; Riley Riddell, F
- 2003–04: Luke Erickson, F
- 2004–05: Matt Climie, G
- 2005–06: Cody Bostock, D; Tyler Scofield, F
- 2006–07: Joey Moggach, F
- 2007–08: Matt Read, F
- 2008–09: Brad Hunt, D; Ben Kinne, F
- 2009–10: Mathieu Dugas, G; Jake Areshenko, D; Jordan George, F

=== WCHA ===
==== Individual awards ====
Player of the Year

- Michael Bitzer (2017)

Defensive Player of the Year

- Elias Rosén (2021)

Rookie of the Year

- Michael Bitzer (2015)

Outstanding Student-Athlete of the Year

- Zach Driscoll (2021)

Goaltending Champion

- Michael Bitzer (2017)

Coach of the Year

- Tom Serratore (2017, 2020)

==== All-WCHA Teams ====
First Team

- 2016–17: Michael Bitzer, G
- 2019–20: Adam Brady, F
- 2020–21: Elias Rosén, D

Second Team

- 2014–15: Matt Prapavessis, D
- 2016–17: Phillip Marinaccio, F
- 2017–18: Michael Bitzer, G
- 2018–19: Justin Baudry, D
- 2019–20: Zach Driscoll, G; Tommy Muck, D

Third Team

- 2013–14: Matt Prapavessis, D
- 2014–15: Brendan Harms, F
- 2016–17: Gerry Fitzgerald, F
- 2019–20: Elias Rosén, D; Owen Sillinger, F
- 2020–21: Zach Driscoll, G

Rookie Team

- 2013–14: Ruslan Pedan, D
- 2014–15: Michael Bitzer, G
- 2016–17: Zach Whitecloud, F
- 2018–19: Owen Sillinger, F
- 2019–20: Elias Rosén, D
- 2020–21: Lukas Sillinger, F

=== CCHA ===
==== Individual awards ====
Best Defensive Forward

- Jackson Jutting: 2024, 2025

==== All-Conference Teams ====
First Team All-CCHA

- 2021–22: Elias Rosén, D
- 2022–23: Elias Rosén, D
- 2023–24: Mattias Sholl, G; Kyle Looft, D; Eric Pohlkamp, D; Lleyton Roed, F

Second Team all-CCHA

- 2021–22: Owen Sillinger, F
- 2022–23: Mattias Sholl, G

CCHA All-Rookie Team

- 2021–22: Mattias Sholl, G
- 2022–23: Lleyton Roed, F
- 2023–24: Eric Pohlkamp, D
- 2024–25: Isa Parekh, D

== Statistical leaders ==
=== Career scoring leaders ===
GP = Games played; G = Goals; A = Assists; Pts = Points; PIM = Penalty minutes

Player	Years	GP	G	A	Pts	PIM
Mike Alexander	1982–1986	136	98	154	252	160
Mark Eagles	1972–1976	116	100	125	225	80
Joel Otto	1980–1984	122	89	115	204	134
Scott Johnson	1987–1991	132	96	95	191	94
Rod Heisler	1975–1979	121	100	90	190	70
Wendal Jellison	1981–1985	134	86	99	185	157
Dan Richards	1985–1989	132	87	93	180	40
Jamie Erb	1989–1993	108	86	94	180	71
John Murphy	1975–1979	122	71	98	169	50
Scott Currie	1975–1979	122	77	88	165	107

=== Career goaltending leaders ===
GP = Games played; Min = Minutes played; GA = Goals against; SO = Shutouts; SV% = Save percentage; GAA = Goals against average

Minimum 1500 minutes

Player	Years	GP	Min	W	L	T	GA	SO	SV%	GAA
Michael Bitzer	2014–2018	138	8227	65	54	19	271	21	.921	1.98
Zach Driscoll	2018–2021	102	5847	52	35	12	213	10	.920	2.19
Matt Dalton	2007–2009	36	2094	20	14	1	80	3	.915	2.29
Blane Comstock	1967–1971	86	4878	70	12	1	190	9	.905	2.34
Matt Climie	2004–2008	95	5427	45	30	11	222	12	.908	2.45

Statistics current through the start of the 2021-22 season.

== Players ==
=== Roster ===
As of August 29, 2025.

No.	Nat.	Player	Class	Pos	Height	Weight	DoB	Hometown	Previous team	NHL rights
1	(Canada)	Max Hildebrand	Freshman	G	6' 1" (1.85 m)	187 lb (85 kg)	2004-06-29	Martensville, Saskatchewan	Prince Albert Raiders (WHL)	—
2	(United States)	Maxon Vig	Freshman	D	6' 2" (1.88 m)	212 lb (96 kg)	2005-11-17	Bismarck, North Dakota	Cedar Rapids RoughRiders (USHL)	MTL, 209th overall 2025
4	(Finland)	Patrik Satosaari	Senior	D	6' 0" (1.83 m)	180 lb (82 kg)	2001-06-18	Jyväskylä, Finland	Lahti Pelicans U20 (U20 SM-sarja)	—
5	(Canada)	Hudson Thornton	Freshman	D	5' 11" (1.8 m)	192 lb (87 kg)	2003-11-04	Winnipeg, Manitoba	Orlando Solar Bears (ECHL)	—
6	(United States)	Mitch Wolfe	Senior	D	6' 0" (1.83 m)	183 lb (83 kg)	2002-07-19	Andover, Minnesota	Des Moines Buccaneers (USHL)	—
7	(Canada)	Isa Parekh	Sophomore	D	6' 0" (1.83 m)	157 lb (71 kg)	2003-09-27	Toronto, Ontario	Nanaimo Clippers (BCHL)	—
8	(Canada)	Vincent Labelle	Junior	F	6' 0" (1.83 m)	168 lb (76 kg)	2002-09-03	Ottawa, Ontario	Ottawa (OUA)	—
9	(United States)	Jaksen Panzer	Sophomore	F	5' 10" (1.78 m)	170 lb (77 kg)	2004-04-08	Grand Forks, North Dakota	Sioux Falls Stampede (USHL)	—
11	(United States)	Adam Flammang	Senior	F	6' 0" (1.83 m)	187 lb (85 kg)	2001-11-09	St. Michael, Minnesota	Cedar Rapids RoughRiders (USHL)	—
12	(Canada)	A. J. Macaulay	Senior	D	5' 9" (1.75 m)	175 lb (79 kg)	2002-04-12	Bonnyville, Alberta	Alaska (NCAA)	—
13	(Canada)	Ben Vigneault	Freshman	D	6' 0" (1.83 m)	181 lb (82 kg)	2004-06-04	Boischâtel, Quebec	Québec Remparts (QMJHL)	—
14	(Canada)	Alexi Sylvestre	Sophomore	F	6' 2" (1.88 m)	194 lb (88 kg)	2004-08-27	Sainte-Martine, Quebec	Flin Flon Bombers (SJHL)	—
15	(Canada)	Connor McClennon	Junior	F	5' 8" (1.73 m)	163 lb (74 kg)	2002-06-25	Wainwright, Alberta	Alberta (CWUAA)	PHI, 178th overall 2020
16	(Sweden)	Oscar Karlsson	Freshman	F	6' 2" (1.88 m)	179 lb (81 kg)	2005-07-18	Linköping, Sweden	Linköping HC J20 (J20 Nationell)	—
17	(Canada)	Noah Quinn	Junior	F	6' 1" (1.85 m)	173 lb (78 kg)	2003-06-02	Nelson, British Columbia	Cranbrook Bucks (BCHL)	—
18	(United States)	Max Namestnikov	Freshman	F	5' 8" (1.73 m)	183 lb (83 kg)	2004-02-06	Wolverine, Michigan	Guelph Storm (OHL)	—
19	(Canada)	Vann Yuhas	Sophomore	F	6' 0" (1.83 m)	174 lb (79 kg)	2004-02-20	Medicine Hat, Alberta	Drumheller Dragons (AJHL)	—
20	(United States)	Kirklan Irey	Senior	F	5' 11" (1.8 m)	172 lb (78 kg)	2001-01-08	Bismarck, North Dakota	Sioux City Musketeers (USHL)	—
21	(United States)	Vince Corcoran	Senior	F	5' 8" (1.73 m)	165 lb (75 kg)	2001-09-21	Plainfield, Illinois	Wichita Falls Warriors (NAHL)	—
22	(Canada)	Oliver Peer	Sophomore	F	6' 0" (1.83 m)	170 lb (77 kg)	2003-03-09	Burlington, Ontario	New Brunswick (AUS)	—
23	(United States)	Luke Roelofs	Sophomore	D	6' 2" (1.88 m)	192 lb (87 kg)	2003-03-17	Minnetrista, Minnesota	Bismarck Bobcats (NAHL)	—
25	(United States)	Tory Lund	Sophomore	F	5' 10" (1.78 m)	185 lb (84 kg)	2004-07-30	Sartell, Minnesota	El Paso Rhinos (NAHL)	—
26	(Canada)	Reilly Funk	Senior (RS)	F	6' 3" (1.91 m)	194 lb (88 kg)	2000-12-23	Portage, Manitoba	Northern Michigan (CCHA)	—
27	(Canada)	Jake McLean	Junior	F	6' 0" (1.83 m)	183 lb (83 kg)	2002-07-27	North Vancouver, British Columbia	Bismarck Bobcats (NAHL)	—
28	(Norway)	Kasper Magnussen	Junior	F	6' 1" (1.85 m)	196 lb (89 kg)	2004-02-19	Fredrikstad, Norway	Leksands IF J20 (J20 Nationell)	—
29	(Canada)	Ryan Henderson	Sophomore	D	6' 2" (1.88 m)	170 lb (77 kg)	2004-06-10	Lethbridge, Alberta	Drumheller Dragons (USHL)	—
33	(United States)	Trent Wiemken	Sophomore	G	6' 0" (1.83 m)	170 lb (77 kg)	2004-03-23	Fargo, North Dakota	Austin Bruins (NAHL)	—
35	(United States)	Raythan Robbins	Junior	G	5' 11" (1.8 m)	187 lb (85 kg)	2002-06-05	Anchorage, Alaska	Muskegon Lumberjacks (USHL)	—

== Olympians ==
This is a list of Bemidji State alumni were a part of an Olympic team.

Name	Position	Bemidji State Tenure	Team	Year	Finish
Charles Brown	Defenseman	1968–1971	(United States) USA	1972	Silver
Jim McElmury	Defenseman	1967–1971	(United States) USA	1972	Silver
Blane Comstock	Goaltender	1967–1971	(United States) USA	1976	5th
Gary Ross	Defenseman	1973–1975	(United States) USA	1976	5th
Joel Otto	Center	1980–1984	(United States) USA	1998	6th

== Beavers in the NHL ==
As of July 1, 2025.

= NHL All-Star team	= NHL All-Star	= NHL All-Star and NHL All-Star team	= Hall of Famers

Player	Position	Team(s)	Years	Games	Stanley Cups
Matt Climie	Goaltender	DAL, PHO	2008–2011	5	0
Brad Hunt	Defenseman	EDM, STL, NSH, VGK, MIN, VAN, COL	2013–2023	288	0
Jim McElmury	Defenseman	KCS, COR	1972–1978	180	0
Andrew Murray	Center	CBJ, STL	2007–2013	221	0
Joel Otto	Center	CGY, PHI	1984–1998	943	1
Matt Read	Right wing	PHI, MIN	2011–2019	449	0
Gary Sargent	Defenseman	LAK, MNS	1975–1983	402	0
Owen Sillinger	Defenseman	CBJ	2024–Present	1	0
Dale Smedsmo	Left wing	TOR	1972–1973	4	0
Zach Whitecloud	Defenseman	CGYVGK	2017–Present	403	1

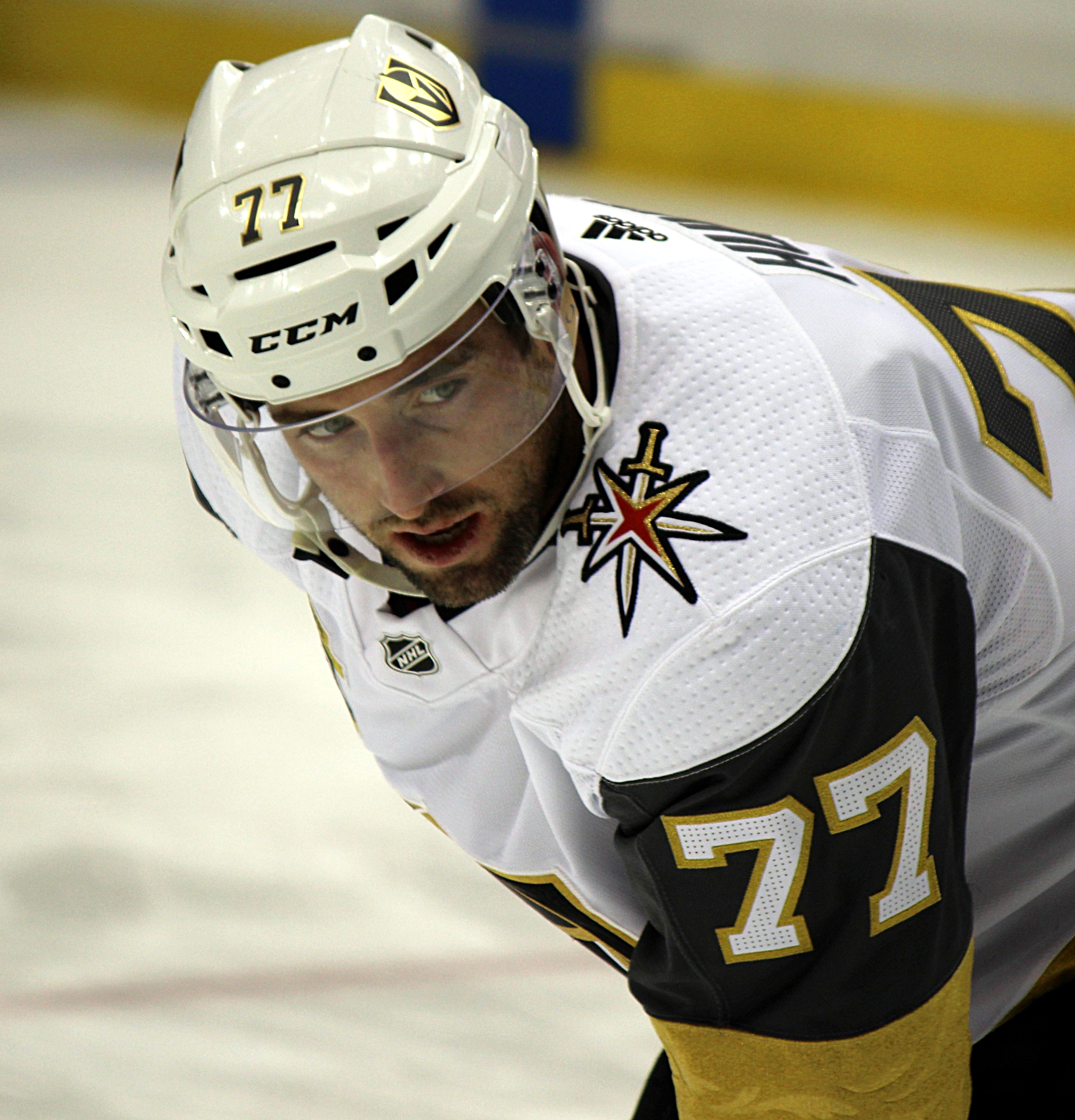
Brad Hunt

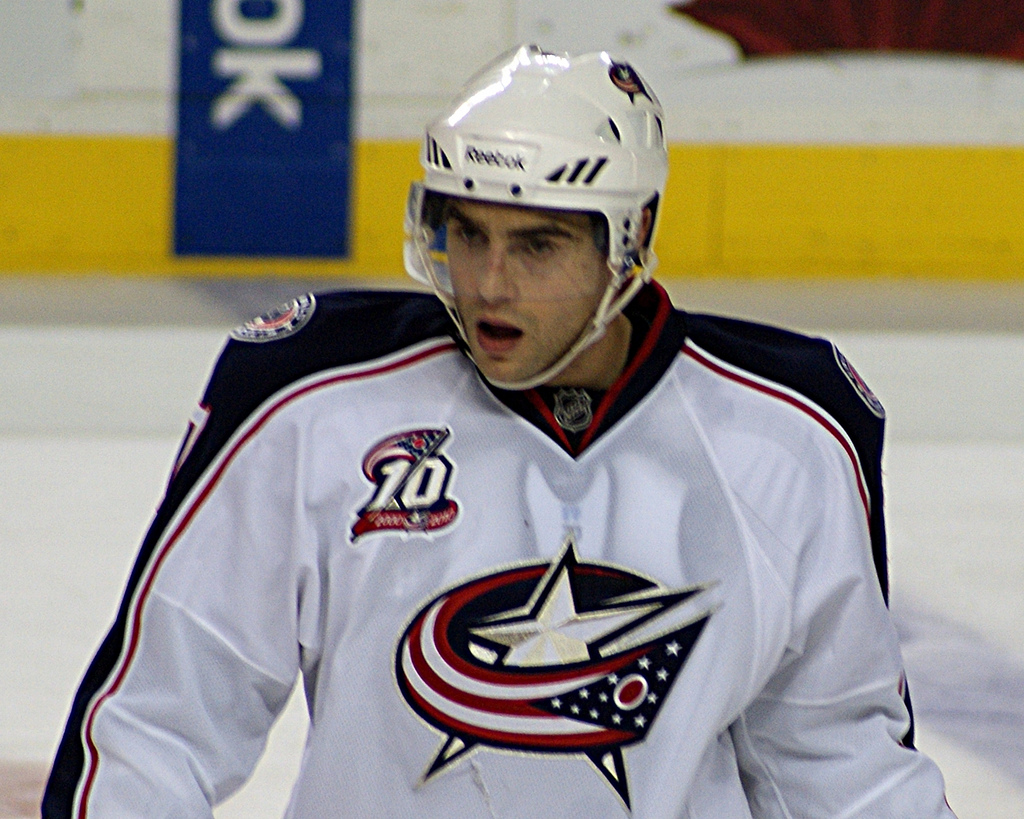
Andrew Murray

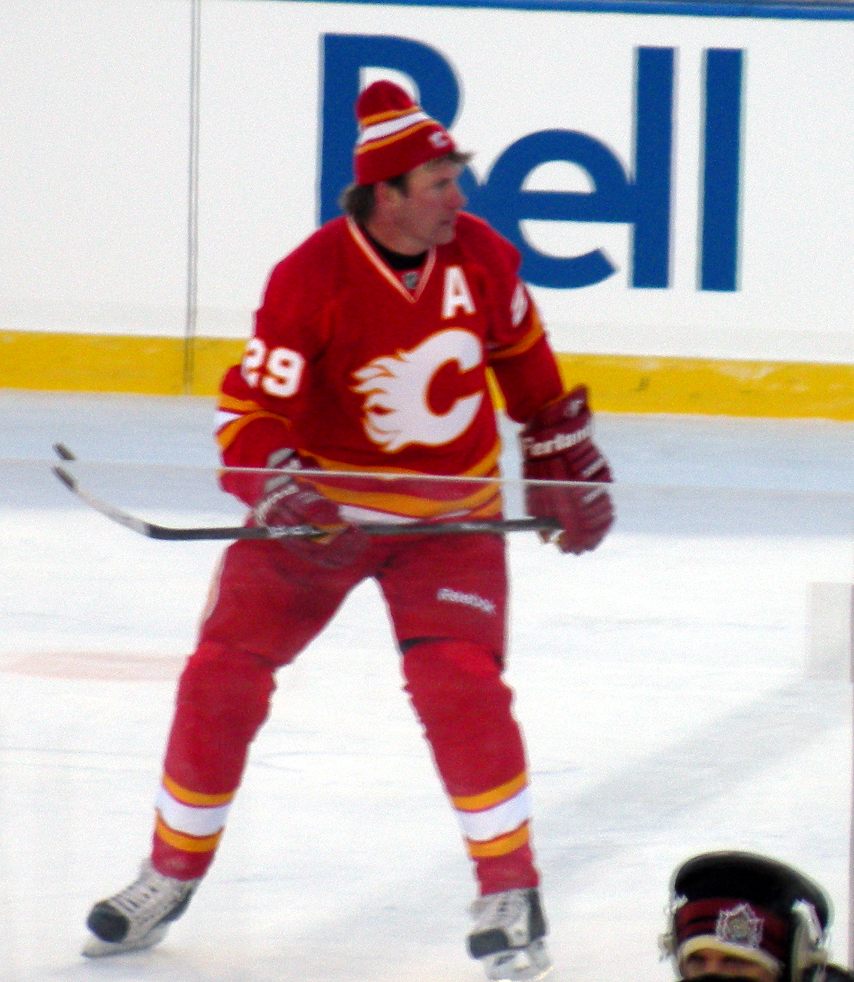
Joel Otto

=== WHA ===
One player was a member of the WHA.

Player	Position	Team(s)	Years	Avco Cups
Dale Smedsmo	Left wing	CIN, NEW, IND	1975–1978	0

== See also ==
- Bemidji State Beavers women's ice hockey
