= List of University of Massachusetts people =

The following is a partial list that includes graduates, professors, administrators and other notable people associated with the University of Massachusetts Lowell (UMass Lowell).

== Alumni ==
=== Art, entertainment and music ===
Name	Class year	Notability	Reference
Jerry Bergonzi	1971	Jazz musician	
Bonnie Comley		Broadway and film producer	
Monica Omodorion Swaida		Nigerian/American singer, actress, movie producer and CEO of an insurance company	
John Pinette		Comedian and actor	
Evan Roderick		Actor	
Thelma Todd		Actress	
Bob Weston	1988	Musician, producer and recording engineer	

=== Business ===
Name	Class year	Notability	Reference
Roger W. Cressey	1987	Former U.S. National Security Council staff, founder and previous president of Good Harbor Consulting Group, and current partner at Liberty Group Ventures	
Edson deCastro		President and founder, Data General Corporation	
Renée Elliott	1986	Founder of British organic supermarket chain Planet Organic	
Martin Fleming	1974	Economist and business executive; IBM's chief economist and VP	
Harish Hande	1998 & 2000	Indian social entrepreneur and co-founder of SELCO	
Rich Miner		Creator of Wildfire, co-founder of Android Inc., and investment partner on the Google Ventures team	

=== Education ===
Name	Class year	Notability	Reference
Bob Bachelder	1954	Orchestra leader and educator	

=== Media and writing ===
Name	Class year	Notability	Reference
Michael Casey	1968	Poet and writer	
Paul Maher Jr.		Writer	

=== Military ===
Name	Class year	Notability	Reference
Mary Hallaren		Director of the Women's Army Corps	
Jack Weinstein		U.S. Air Force lieutenant general	

=== Politics ===
Name	Class year	Notability	Reference
Peter Bragdon		Politician	
Sam Cataldo		Politician	
James Costos	1985	Diplomat and former U.S. ambassador to Spain and Andorra	
Steve Court		Politician	
Donna Cuomo		Politician	
Brian Dempsey	att. 1985–88	Politician	
Christopher Fallon		Politician and attorney	
Kevin L. Finnegan	1996	Politician	
Sean Garballey	2007	Member of the Massachusetts House of Representatives (2008–present)	
Colleen Garry		Politician	
Stéphane Gendron		Canadian politician	
Thomas Golden Jr.		Politician	
Geoff Hall		Teacher and politician	
Corey Lewandowski		Political consultant, former CNN commentator and campaign manager for Donald Trump's 2016 presidential campaign	
Thomas M. McGee		Former state representative and former mayor of Lynn, Massachusetts, current Chair of the MBTA Board of Directors	
Marty Meehan		Former congressman (1993–2007), UMass Lowell chancellor (2007–2015), and current University of Massachusetts System president (2015–present)	
Tolu Obdebiyi		Nigerian politician	
Alan Solomont	1977	Diplomat and former U.S. ambassador to Spain and Andorra	
Dan Toomey		New Hampshire politician	
Francisco Urena		Government official, former Massachusetts secretary of Veterans' Affairs	
Jonathan Zlotnik	2012	Massachusetts politician	

=== Science ===
Name	Class year	Notability	Reference
Arthur G. Hunt		Plant and soils scientist, fellow of the American Association for the Advancement of Science (2017)	
John Traphagan		Anthropologist	
Yang Yang		Taiwanese engineering professor	

=== Sports ===
==== Hockey ====
Name	Class year	Notability	Reference
Mark Carlson	1993	Cedar Rapids RoughRiders president, head coach and general manager	
Craig Charron		Former AHL player	
Jeff Daw		Former NHL player with the Colorado Avalanche	
Scott Fankhouser		Former NHL player with the Atlanta Thrashers	
Christian Folin		NHL player with the Los Angeles Kings	
Joe Gambardella		NHL player with the Edmonton Oilers and current AHL player with Bakersfield Condors	
Ron Hainsey		NHL player with the Toronto Maple Leafs	
Connor Hellebuyck		NHL player with the Winnipeg Jets	
Ben Holmstrom		NHL player with the Philadelphia Flyers	
Carter Hutton		NHL player with the Nashville Predators	
Dean Jenkins		Former NHL player with the Los Angeles Kings	
Greg Koehler		Former NHL player with the Carolina Hurricanes	
Mark Kumpel		Member of the 1984 U.S. Olympic Hockey team and former NHL player with the Winnipeg Jets	
Craig MacTavish		Former NHL player with several teams and former coach of the Edmonton Oilers, where he also served as senior vice president	
Jon Morris		Former NHL player with the New Jersey Devils	
Dwayne Roloson		Former NHL player with several teams, including the Edmonton Oilers	
Chad Ruhwedel		NHL player with the Pittsburgh Penguins	
Ben Walter		Former NHL player with the New Jersey Devils	
Scott Wilson		NHL player with the Buffalo Sabres	
Andy Wozniewski		NHL player with the Toronto Maple Leafs, St. Louis Blues and Boston Bruins	

==== Other ====
Name	Class year	Notability	Reference
Jennifer Demby-Horton		Olympic handballer and Pan American Games gold medalist	
Shelagh Donohoe	1988	Rower and Olympic silver medalist	
Ali Kanaan		Lebanese Canadian basketball player	
Mike LaValliere		Former Major League Baseball catcher and Gold Glove award winner	
Harry Lew		First African American Professional Basketball player, 1904; Lowell Textile Institute basketball coach, 1922	

=== Other ===
Name	Class year	Notability	Reference
Roger Mark Boisjoly		Mechanical engineer, fluid dynamicist, and aerodynamicist; known for having raised strenuous objections to the launch of the Space Shuttle Challenger months before the loss of the spacecraft and its crew in January 1986	
Anthony Braga	1991	Criminologist, director of the School of Criminology and Criminal Justice at Northeastern University	
Christopher J. Coyne		Bishop of Burlington, Vermont	
Taylor von Kriegenbergh		Poker player	
Michael R. Lane		Former president of Emporia State University and dean of the School of Business at Missouri Western State University	
Terrence Masson		Animator and producer	
John Ogonowski		Pilot of American Airlines Flight 11 on September 11, 2001	
John Traphagan		Professor of religious studies and Mitsubishi Fellow at the University of Texas at Austin and blogger for The Huffington Post	

== Faculty ==
Name	Time	Notability	Reference
Eunice Alberts	1970s–1980s	Opera and concert singer	
Mary Blewett	1965–1999	Social and labor historian	
George Chigas	2009–present	Khmer scholar and author of the first English translation of The Story of Tum Teav	
Andre Dubus III		Bestselling author, writer-in-residence at UMass Lowell	
Kristin Esterberg		Former associate professor of Sociology	
Carol Hay		Canadian philosopher and author	
Allyssa K. McCabe		Professor emerita of Psychology in the College of Fine Arts, Humanities and Social Sciences	
Arno Rafael Minkkinen	1987–present	Fine art photographer	
Jacqueline Moloney	1994–present	University chancellor and professor of education	
Kay George Roberts	1978–present	Founder and musical director of the New England Orchestra	
Jack M. Wilson	2003–present	Educator, entrepreneur, and president emeritus of the UMass system	

=== Greeley Peace Scholars ===
Name	Year	Notability	Reference
Linda Biehl	2008	South-African peace activist	
Leymah Gbowee	2011	Liberian peace activist	
Tawakkol Karman	2018	Nobel Prize winner	
Sanam Naraghi-Anderlini	2016	Co-founder of International Civil Society Action Network	
Padraig O'Malley	2009	Irish-American peace activist	
John Prendergast	2012/13	Human-rights activist and best-selling author	
Albie Sachs	2014	South African activist leader	
Gavriel Salomon	2010	Psychologist	
