= Shane Henry =

American ice hockey player

- Born: March 15, 1970 (age 55) Vancouver, British Columbia, Canada
- Height: 5 ft 11 in (180 cm)
- Weight: 185 lb (84 kg; 13 st 3 lb)
- Position: Center/Left wing
- Shot: Left
- Played for: Massachusetts–Lowell; Richmond Renegades; Cleveland Lumberjacks; Tallahassee Tiger Sharks; Waco Wizards; Solihull Blaze; Pee Dee Pride
- Playing career: 1990–1998

Shane Henry (born March 15, 1970) is a Canadian retired ice hockey center and left wing who was an All-American for Massachusetts–Lowell.

== Career ==
Henry arrived in Lowell, Massachusetts after a successful junior career that saw him score more than 2 points per game in his final season. Neither the Chiefs nor Henry had much success in his freshman season with Lowell finishing 7th in Hockey East. After the year, head coach Bill Riley Jr. was forced to resign in the midst of an NCAA investigation that saw the program put on probation for two years. The first year under new bench boss Bruce Crowder saw very little difference, but the team saw vast improvements in year two. Henry blossomed in his junior season, doubling his scoring production and leading the team in all three offensive categories. He was awarded the Len Ceglarski Award for sportsmanship by recording just 6 penalties on the year and 11 through three seasons of play. He was named team captain for his senior season and, with Massachusetts Lowell now off probation, he was able to lead the team to its second NCAA tournament at the Division I level. While his goal production was halved, the Chiefs still won 25 games and finished second in their conference. Henry was named to the second All-American team and got his team to its best finish since joining D-I in 1983.

After graduating, he began playing professionally with the Richmond Renegades and helped the club win the Riley Cup that season. Despite some impressive scoring numbers, he played just 2 games at the AAA level before being consigned to the lower levels of pro hockey. He spent much of the 1997 season in England with the Solihull Blaze and then retired following an unimpressive 16-game stint with the Pee Dee Pride.

Henry was inducted into the Massachusetts Lowell athletic Hall of Fame in 2009.

== Statistics ==
=== Regular season and playoffs ===
			Regular Season					Playoffs
Season	Team	League	GP	G	A	Pts	PIM	GP	G	A	Pts	PIM
1987–88	Delta Flyers	BCJHL	14	3	2	5	0	—	—	—	—	—
1988–89	Powell River Paper Kings	BCJHL	51	32	40	72	33	—	—	—	—	—
1989–90	Powell River Paper Kings	BCJHL	45	50	52	102	16	—	—	—	—	—
1990–91	Lowell	Hockey East	34	11	12	23	6	—	—	—	—	—
1991–92	Massachusetts–Lowell	Hockey East	30	11	18	29	4	—	—	—	—	—
1992–93	Massachusetts–Lowell	Hockey East	39	23	35	58	12	—	—	—	—	—
1993–94	Massachusetts–Lowell	Hockey East	38	11	37	48	24	—	—	—	—	—
1994–95	Richmond Renegades	ECHL	57	22	47	69	34	17	3	12	15	6
1994–95	Cleveland Lumberjacks	IHL	2	0	1	1	2	—	—	—	—	—
1995–96	Tallahassee Tiger Sharks	ECHL	45	15	38	53	22	12	2	8	10	2
1996–97	Waco Wizards	WPHL	12	3	2	5	2	—	—	—	—	—
1996–97	Solihull Blaze	BNL	46	37	48	85	26	—	—	—	—	—
1997–98	Pee Dee Pride	ECHL	16	0	4	4	4	—	—	—	—	—
BCHL totals			110	85	94	179	49	—	—	—	—	—
NCAA totals			141	56	102	158	46	—	—	—	—	—
ECHL totals			118	37	89	126	60	29	5	20	25	8

== Awards and honors ==
Award	Year
All-Hockey East Second team	1992–93
All-Hockey East First Team	1993–94
AHCA East Second-Team All-American	1993–94

Awards and achievements
Preceded by Joe Flanagan	Len Ceglarski Award; 1992–93	Succeeded by Michael Spalla
