= UMass Lowell River Hawks men's ice hockey =

College ice hockey team at the University of Massachusetts Lowell

- Current season
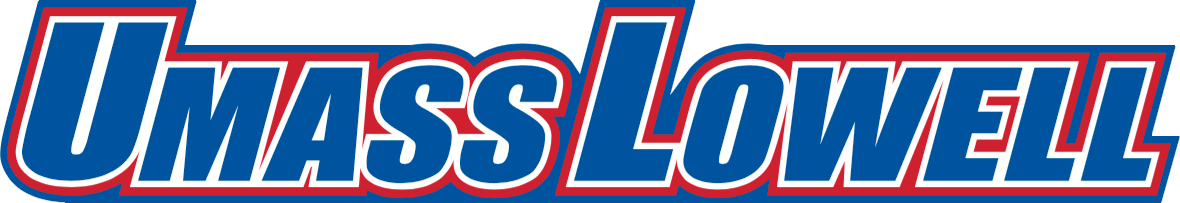
- University: University of Massachusetts Lowell
- Conference: Hockey East
- First season: 1967–68
- Head coach: Norm Bazin; 15th season, 278–185–47 (.591)
- Assistant coaches: Andy Boschetto; Eric Sorenson; Dan Darrow
- Arena: Tsongas Center; Lowell, Massachusetts
- Student section: The Cage at UMass Lowell
- Colors: Blue, White, and Red
- Fight song: River Hawk Pride
- Mascot: Rowdy the River Hawk

NCAA tournament champions
- DII: 1979, 1981, 1982

NCAA tournament Frozen Four
- DI: 2013; DII: 1979, 1980, 1981, 1982, 1983

NCAA tournament appearances
- DI: 1988, 1994, 1996, 2012, 2013, 2014, 2016, 2017, 2022; DII: 1979, 1980, 1981, 1982, 1983

Conference tournament champions
- ECAC 2: 1979, 1981, 1982, 1983; Hockey East: 2013, 2014, 2017

Conference regular season champions
- ECAC 2: 1982, 1983; Hockey East: 2013, 2017

Current uniform

The UMass Lowell River Hawks men's ice hockey team is the college ice hockey team that represents the University of Massachusetts Lowell. It competes at the NCAA Division I level in the Hockey East Association. The team competed at the Division II level until 1983. That year the University of Lowell was raised to D1 in hockey only and joined the newly formed Hockey East Association. Thirty years later with a name change to both the school and the team, the University of Massachusetts Lowell claimed their first Hockey East regular season title and HEA Tournament championship in 2013. The River Hawks made their first Frozen Four in 2013 as well. UMass Lowell would repeat as Hockey East champions in 2014 and then again in 2017.

The River Hawks have played at The Tsongas Center at UMass Lowell since its opening in January 1998.

== Program history ==
=== Early years ===
The roots of the current hockey program can be traced back to when the university was called the Lowell Technological Institute (LTI). Hockey started as a club program in 1965–66, and the team was named the Terriers and coached by Richard Morrison. The program initially used the Billerica Forum for practices and home games. The original rink was outdoors at Cushing Field on North Campus. In 1969, Coach Bill Riley was hired to take over the program and was at the helm of a very colorful run for the next 21 years. After LTI's 1975 merger with Lowell State College to become the University of Lowell, the team became known as the Chiefs but were still without a proper facility. But lack of a proper rink was no deterrent for Coach Riley, who benefited from an increase in homegrown talent. Bobby Orr and the Big Bad Bruins of the late 1960s and early 1970s helped grow the game during the Baby Boomer era in Massachusetts.

For the decade of the UMass Lowell program years, "home" games were conducted in a nomadic manner with the team never playing near campus, as no such facility existed in Lowell. Games were played mostly at Skate 3 Ice Arena in Tyngsboro, and it was still technically UMass Lowell's home rink during their first Division 2 Championship run in 1979. In 1980, the university was able to purchase the Billerica Forum (then called the Merrimack Valley Forum) after the allocation of money pushed for by State Senator B. Joseph Tully. The money, however, only provided for the purchase of the structure and land. Though only constructed in 1964, the Merrimack Valley Forum was called a "pig pen" by Coach Riley. A few years later, State Senator Phil Shea was able to secure $500,000 in funding for renovations of the Forum. The coaching staff became the foreman and applied for federal job training grants in order to bring in tradespeople to help with the work. Soon the Chiefs had a place they could call home and rechristened it as Tully Forum.

=== The Riley era ===
During the team's formative years in the early 1970s, the Chiefs had no conference affiliation besides a loose one with surrounding schools in the ECAC. By the mid-1970s, Riley had started to assemble the core of players who would lead to UMass Lowell to their first national championship: Tom Jacobs from Hudson, Dean Jenkins from Billerica, and future NHL regular Craig McTavish. However, an envious spat began in the Merrimack Valley between Lowell and Merrimack College, just up the road in North Andover. Merrimack's hockey program was what Lowell had aspired to be: a national contender with a modern home rink on campus. But, up until the 1978–79 season, the Merrimack-UMass Lowell rivalry stood at a very one sided 1–13–1, in Merrimack's favor.

With a new post season tournament being sponsored by the NCAA in 1978, Merrimack crushed the competition, including UMass Lowell, in the ECAC tournament and followed it up by going on a tournament run without challenge, defeating both Mankato State and Lake Forest College by a combined score of 18–3. The obsession with Merrimack had grown and festered from the year before. But, with some advance scouting, Coach Riley believed 1979 was the year the Chiefs would jump onto the national stage.

With the help of his student section, dubbed the "Wild Men," Riley wanted to crack the Merrimack goalie, Gilles Moffet, as their defensive depth had taken an early season hit. Their first meeting came right before Thanksgiving, and a theme of turkeys became prevalent in the Wild Men's antics toward Merrimack. The leader of the Wild Men went as far as to send super-imposed pictures of a turkey attached to the Merrimack Goalie to his dorm room. Even Coach Riley had a troll up his sleeve and sent the Wild Men's leader up to New Hampshire to purchase a turkey and tie it up in front of the Merrimack goal. Once the turkey was on the ice, a Lowell 'Wild Woman' ran onto the ice to rescue it. However, the pranks and trolling didn't faze the Merrimack goalie.

We outshot them something like three to one because they were so weak on defense, says Riley, But wouldn't you know, they still tied us, 3–3. It was all our own fault because the goalie was damned if he was going to let the puck in the net.

Going into the 1979 season, Coach Riley spoke at an alumni dinner to try to drum up support for the hockey program, where he wrote a big check with his wordage toward the upcoming season.

We had an alumni fundraiser before the season, and I was up on the podium trying to jazz up the alumni, Riley related. I don't remember what I said at the beginning of my speech, but at the end I said that if we don't win the national championship this year, it will be a disappointing season.

Still playing at Skate 3 Tyngsboro, Coach Riley sought to distill an attitude of us against the world, according to members of the 1979 Chiefs team. Team morale was not very high, and the Chiefs struggled in the early part of the season.

We were playing like a bunch of punks, says Riley. I was so mad, I hit the locker room door as hard as I could to prove a point. Sometimes, you role play as a coach. I could even put tears in my eyes to emphasize a point. But, this time, I didn’t have to role play. I was really mad. As soon as I hit it, I knew I’d broken something. The next day, I walked in and had it in a cast. I was hiding it inside my sports jacket. For three-quarters of the pre-game meal, I looked like Napoleon. Of course, there was no real hiding it. It was pretty embarrassing, says Riley. I’d go to the bank teller and she’d say, What happened to your arm? Oh, you don’t want to know. No, tell me, what happened to your arm? Well, I punched a locker room door. And she’d give me that look, like, Oh, how childish, how juvenile, how immature.

After that point, UMass Lowell went 24–2 and with the addition of future All-American Paul Lohnes, of the Blue Line, and Mark Jenkins, who had transferred from Union forgoing a pro contract to use his last year of eligibility to play with his brother Dean. Things began to click for the Chiefs and even rival Merrimack could not escape the wrath of the Chiefs, who had been 1–13–1 against Merrimack until the 1978–79 season. After narrowly beating Salem State College in the ECAC Championship, Lowell made their first appearance in the Division 2 National Championship. Being hosted at the Volpe Center in Merrimack gave Lowell de facto home ice, and they cruised past Illinois-Chicago in the semifinal game and made very easy work of Mankato State in the Championship game, winning 6–4.

=== 2 in 3: Bump to Division I ===
After moving into Tully in 1980 and making the barn on Rte. 129 a permanent home for the Chiefs, the program was rewarded with two more national championships, in 1981 & 1982, with same core group of guys from the 1979 run. In 1981, UMass Lowell was facing Plattsburgh State (NY) for the Championship at Tully Forum. Knowing that Dave Poulin on Plattsburgh State was prone to spastic reactions when thrown off his game, Coach Riley set in on him to take him out of the game mentally. Poulin was to be pressured, hit, and squeezed by the Chiefs players. The strategy worked until Poulin, who had been sent off the ice early, ran into some "trouble" in the locker room underneath the stands.

The kid was so mad, he starting pulling the pipes off the wall, says Riley. Eventually, he pulled off the water pipes. The rink manager came over to me while the second period was still going and said, 'Listen, Billy, that big forward Poulin from Plattsburgh pulled the pipes right out of the wall. There’s water spraying all over their locker room. What do you want me to do?' I said, You know what I want you to do. Don’t do a thing until the third period. Then turn the water off. Sure enough, the Plattsburgh team was going into the third period for the national championship and they had water spraying all over their locker room during intermission. They probably went in the showers to stay dry.

During this time the rivalry with Merrimack was a more even match, the hate, or one might say envy, for the school in North Andover burned the same in Coach Riley.

I was ranting and raving, he says. I got to the end of my vociferous dialogue and said, 'I hate Merrimack. I hate their school. I hate the color of their uniforms. I hate the Indian chief on their shirts… I even hate their #$%@& zip code. I had just run out of things to hate, he says laughing.What you have to understand, he adds with a straight face, is that we had always looked up to Merrimack, so what I said, I said affectionately.

After the 1983–1984 season, Lowell pushed forward to Division 1 and a new league was now forming in the area amongst the former ECAC schools. Although, not all of those schools were keen on the idea of admitting Lowell to the newly formed union. Boston College, in particular, was no friend of Lowell. The Chiefs had beaten them as a D2 school and one could speculate did not want to view Lowell on the same level as fellow institutions joining Hockey East. Clarkson and St. Lawerence were considering joining Hockey East and carried voting powers at this time. In the eleventh hour, both schools voted Lowell into the league and then committed to joining the ECAC. Coach Riley later recounted,

"This was before cell phones and I dropped a lot of quarters into pay phones at the rink making calls. I think I spent more time on the phone than I did on the ice. It was stressful, and it took a lot out of me."

Lowell's transition to Division 1 was led by Chelmsford Native and future NHL stalwart Jon Morris. Northeastern Coach and Gold Medal Winner Ben Smith gave Morris the nickname of Ghost,

"He'd be in front of their defensemen, then vanish and reappear behind them. "

Jon Morris is still the All-Time Leading Scorer in Hockey East History recording 177 points over his 4 years with the Chiefs. The Chiefs posted their first 20+ win season at the Division 1 Level in 1986-1987. The following season Lowell recorded another 20+ win season and made their first appearance in the NCAA Tournament bowing out to Wisconsin in the First Round. The next 3 years Lowell posted Sub .500 records and after the 1990-1991 season, Riley decided to retire. There had been some friction between University administrator and Riley and after 21 years of service to the University, Riley decided to step aside. At the time there was an NCAA investigation into the program due to a pep talk between the 2nd and 3rd period of a game against Boston University. Jack Parker and Coach Riley had played together at Boston University during the 1960s. While Lowell had sustained success against Boston College beating Boston University had always been too tall of a task for the Chiefs. Coach Riley decided to put his money where his mouth is with his boys.

“Unlike a lot of schools, the university never fed the guys after the game. They were just supposed to go out on their own even though they hadn’t had anything to eat since before four o’clock in the afternoon. So I gave a pep talk between the second and third period. I threw down a couple hundred dollars and said, Listen, if we win this game, the party’s on me"

The Chiefs won the game but the incident was the icing on the cake on the cantankerous relationship that Riley had with the then current administration

“They wanted to say that I was paying the kids, but it was just that the pizza was on me, Sometimes, the pioneers are the ones with the arrows in their backs. The president that we have here now, and was there at the time, never wanted us to go Division I. I got a lot of things here in spite of his wishes. Even when you beat your boss, you still lose down the road.”

=== The Crowder Era: the Rise of the River Hawks ===
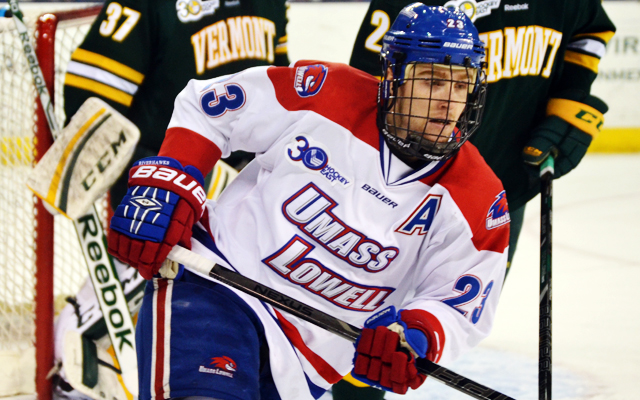
Scott Wilson with the River Hawks in 2014

The mark Riley left on the program continues onto the present era. Norm Bazin now coach of the River Hawks was recruited by Riley and donned the "Ranger" style era Lowell across his chest at the Tully.

With Riley retiring a search was put out for a new coach and Lowell brought in former Boston Bruin and then at the time Maine assistant Maine Coach Bruce Crowder. Crowder was instrumental in the rise of the Maine Hockey program under legendary coach Shawn Walsh. Crowder first season was a sub 500 record, but the following season Lowell posted a 20 win season missing the NCAA tournament. The Chiefs were showing signs of things to come with Dwayne Roloson in net and the suburb first line pairing of Mike Murray and Shane Henry. The 1993–1994 season would be the last season under the Chiefs moniker.

Freshman phenom and Hockey East leading scorer Greg Bullock made his debut with the Chiefs in 1993–1994. Bullock's greatest attribute was his skating ability with a background in power and figure skating. Bullock took full advantage of his lateral skating ability creating many opportunities for himself on uncorralled rebounds. The season itself was Lowell's great success up until that point in Division 1. Crowder was able to scale the mountain that was Boston University in February 1994 and played a memorably infamous home series against Maine the following weekend. In front of two sold-out crowds at Tully Forum what appears in the record book as wins for Lowell. Were in fact actually two ties against the Black Bears. Due to an academic scandal with the Maine Hockey program, Lowell has been retroactively rewarded wins for this series. Lowell finished second in Hockey East and made their first appearance in the Championship game at the Boston Garden losing a 3–2 game to Jack Parker's Terriers. Given at At-Large bid in the 1994 NCAA Tournament Lowell was sent West and was forced to play a de facto home game against Michigan State at Munn Ice Arena in East Lansing in the 1st round. Grinding out a 4–3 win Lowell moved on to face the Minnesota Golden Gophers the next night in front of heavily attended Minnesota crowd. The two teams skated to a 1–1 tie for the first 60 minutes of regulation in a very tight game. During the first overtime, Minnesota Jeff Nielsen potted the game-winning goal off of a Lowell turnover ending the hopes of a Frozen Four appearance.

== Season-by-season results ==
Source:

== Head coach history ==
As of the completion of 2024–25 season

Tenure	Coach	Years	Record	Pct.
1967–1969	Richard Morrison	2	11–16–1	.411
1969–1991	Bill Riley Jr.	22	363–270–22	.571
1991–1996	Bruce Crowder	5	99–75–19	.562
1996–2001	Tim Whitehead	5	76–95–11	.448
2001–2011	Blaise MacDonald	10	150–178–42	.462
2011–Present	Norm Bazin	14	278–185–47	.591
Totals	6 coaches	58 seasons	977–819–142	.541

== Statistical leaders ==
=== Career points leaders ===
Player	Years	GP	G	A	Pts	PIM
Mike Carr	1979–1983	121	134	145	279	143
Jon Morris	1984–1988	153	97	134	231	155
Tom Jacobs	1975–1979	99	97	103	200	132
Kevin Charbonneau	1978–1982	128	74	119	193	120
Dean Jenkins	1977–1981	117	73	118	191	269
Ken Kaiser	1979–1983	103	65	107	172	60
Christian Sbrocca	1992–1996	158	57	115	171	315
Paul Lohnes	1978–1982	129	58	109	167	176
Steve Woods	1971–1975	89	77	83	160	70
Shane Henry	1990–1994	141	56	102	158	46

=== Career goaltending leaders ===
GP = Games played; Min = Minutes played; W = Wins; L = Losses; T = Ties; GA = Goals against; SO = Shutouts; SV% = Save percentage; GAA = Goals against average

Minimum 50 games played

Player	Years	GP	Min	W	L	T	GA	SO	SV%	GAA
Connor Hellebuyck	2012–2014	53	3144	38	12	2	84	12	.946	1.60
Kevin Boyle	2014–2016	73	4326	42	19	11	151	10	.925	2.09
Christoffer Hernberg	2015–2019	51	2760	23	16	3	102	8	.917	2.22
Tyler Wall	2016–2020	103	5902	58	34	10	224	9	.918	2.28
Carter Hutton	2006–2010	85	5004	32	41	10	194	10	.913	2.33

Statistics current through the start of the 2020–21 season.

== Roster ==
As of September 14, 2025.

No.	Nat.	Player	Class	Pos	Height	Weight	DoB	Hometown	Previous team	NHL rights
2	(United States)	Daniel Buchbinder	Sophomore	D	6' 3" (1.91 m)	190 lb (86 kg)	2004-07-07	Buffalo, New York	Penticton Vees (BCHL)	—
3	(United States)	Dominick Rivelli	Sophomore	F	5' 10" (1.78 m)	176 lb (80 kg)	2003-08-01	Highland Park, Illinois	New Jersey Titans (NAHL)	—
4	(United States)	T. J. Schweighardt	Senior	D	5' 10" (1.78 m)	180 lb (82 kg)	2001-03-15	Wayne, New Jersey	Youngstown Phantoms (USHL)	—
5	(United States)	Jay Ahearn	Senior	F	5' 11" (1.8 m)	170 lb (77 kg)	2001-05-23	Staten Island, New York	Niagara (NAHL)	—
6	(Canada)	James Johnson	Freshman	D	6' 6" (1.98 m)	203 lb (92 kg)	2004-04-16	Ajax, Ontario	Nanaimo Clippers (BCHL)	—
7	(Canada)	Cole Lonsdale	Freshman	F	5' 11" (1.8 m)	170 lb (77 kg)	2004-05-30	Mississauga, Ontario	Nanaimo Clippers (BCHL)	—
8	(United States)	Jaiden Moriello	Junior	F	6' 2" (1.88 m)	190 lb (86 kg)	2003-05-04	Saugus, Massachusetts	West Kelowna Warriors (BCHL)	—
9	(United States)	Jack Collins	Senior	F	6' 4" (1.93 m)	215 lb (98 kg)	2001-11-13	Canton, New York	Lone Star Brahmas (NAHL)	—
10	(United States)	Chris Delaney	Sophomore	F	5' 6" (1.68 m)	146 lb (66 kg)	2004-09-25	Hopkinton, Massachusetts	Madison Capitols (USHL)	—
11	(Canada)	Tnias Mathurin	Freshman	D	6' 3" (1.91 m)	201 lb (91 kg)	2004-01-15	Ajax, Ontario	Windsor Spitfires (OHL)	DET, 137th overall 2022
12	(Canada)	Luke Shipley	Freshman	D	6' 0" (1.83 m)	187 lb (85 kg)	2004-08-08	Powell River, British Columbia	Brandon Wheat Kings (WHL)	—
13	(Canada)	Nate Misskey	Freshman	D	6' 4" (1.93 m)	212 lb (96 kg)	2005-01-12	Melfort, Saskatchewan	Victoria Royals (WHL)	SJS, 143rd overall 2024
14	(Canada)	Dalyn Wakely	Freshman	F	6' 1" (1.85 m)	198 lb (90 kg)	2004-03-05	Port Hope, Ontario	Barrie Colts (OHL)	EDM, 192nd overall 2024
15	(Canada)	David Adaszynski	Freshman	F	5' 11" (1.8 m)	196 lb (89 kg)	2005-05-25	Burnaby, British Columbia	Calgary Hitmen (WHL)	—
17	(Canada)	Mirko Buttazoni	Sophomore	F	5' 10" (1.78 m)	190 lb (86 kg)	2004-09-12	Langley, British Columbia	Brooks Bandits (BCHL)	—
18	(United States)	Sean Kilcullen	Junior	D	6' 0" (1.83 m)	190 lb (86 kg)	2002-08-03	Kensington, Maryland	Maryland Black Bears (NAHL)	—
19	(United States)	Dillan Bentley	Senior	F	6' 4" (1.93 m)	190 lb (86 kg)	2001-03-31	Peoria, Illinois	New Mexico Ice Wolves (NAHL)	—
20	(Slovakia)	Libor Nemec	Sophomore	F	6' 2" (1.88 m)	187 lb (85 kg)	2003-09-03	Bardejov, Slovakia	Green Bay Gamblers (USHL)	—
21	(Canada)	Connor Eddy	Senior	F	6' 1" (1.85 m)	200 lb (91 kg)	2002-04-18	Victoria, British Columbia	Northern Michigan (CCHA)	—
22	(Canada)	Josh Mori	Freshman	D	5' 11" (1.8 m)	174 lb (79 kg)	2004-03-27	Richmond, British Columbia	Edmonton Oil Kings (WHL)	—
23	(Canada)	Lee Parks	Sophomore	F	6' 2" (1.88 m)	218 lb (99 kg)	2004-10-16	Stittsville, Ontario	Fargo Force (USHL)	—
26	(United States)	Jacob MacDonald	Sophomore	F	6' 2" (1.88 m)	190 lb (86 kg)	2004-09-23	Fort Worth, Texas	Lone Star Brahmas (NAHL)	—
27	(Canada)	Dominic Payne	Sophomore	D	6' 1" (1.85 m)	176 lb (80 kg)	2004-12-08	North Vancouver, British Columbia	Canisius (AHA)	—
29	(United States)	Jak Vaarwerk	Junior	F	6' 0" (1.83 m)	181 lb (82 kg)	2003-06-13	East Amherst, New York	Des Moines Buccaneers (USHL)	—
30	(United States)	Niko Goich	Freshman	G	6' 4" (1.93 m)	174 lb (79 kg)	2004-03-24	Homer Glen, Illinois	Shreveport Mudbugs (NAHL)	—
31	(Canada)	Austin Elliott	Freshman	G	6' 2" (1.88 m)	185 lb (84 kg)	2004-05-14	Strathmore, Alberta	London Knights (OHL)	—
33	(Canada)	Samuel Richard	Senior	G	6' 0" (1.83 m)	170 lb (77 kg)	2001-03-12	Sainte-Catherine, Quebec	New Brunswick (AUS)	—
53	(Sweden)	August Classon	Freshman	D	6' 0" (1.83 m)	185 lb (84 kg)	2004-08-03	Stockholm, Sweden	Lone Star Brahmas (NAHL)	—
90	(United States)	Diego Buttazzoni	Freshman	F	5' 9" (1.75 m)	183 lb (83 kg)	2006-01-13	Langley, British Columbia	Portland Winterhawks (WHL)	—

== Awards and honors ==
=== NCAA ===
==== Individual awards ====
Tournament Most Outstanding Player

- Craig MacTavish: 1979
- Tom Mulligan: 1981
- Paul Lohnes: 1982

Spencer Penrose Award

- Bruce Crowder: 1996
- Norm Bazin: 2013

Mike Richter Award

- Connor Hellebuyck: 2014

==== All-American teams ====
AHCA Division II All-Americans

- 1978–79: Tom Jacobs, F; Craig MacTavish, F
- 1979–80: Tom Mulligan, D; Paul Lohnes, D; Dean Jenkins, F
- 1980–81: Paul Lohnes, D; Dean Jenkins, F
- 1981–82: Paul Lohnes, D; Ken Kaiser, F; John MacKenzie, F
- 1982–83: Mike Carr, F

AHCA First Team All-Americans

- 1993–94: Dwayne Roloson, G
- 1994–95: Greg Bullock, F
- 2012–13: Chad Ruhwedel, D
- 2013–14: Connor Hellebuyck, G

AHCA Second Team All-Americans

- 1986–87: Jon Morris, F
- 1993–94: Shane Henry, F
- 2000–01: Ron Hainsey, D
- 2008–09: Maury Edwards, D
- 2016–17: Dylan Zink, F

=== ECAC 2 ===
==== Individual awards ====
Player of the Year

- Craig MacTavish: 1979
- Dana Demole: 1983

Rookie of the Year

- Craig MacTavish: 1978
- Mark Kumpel: 1980
- Dana Demole: 1983

==== All-Conference teams ====
All-ECAC 2

- 1971–72: Mike McElligott
- 1977–78: Craig MacTavish
- 1978–79: Craig MacTavish; Tom Jacobs
- 1979–80: Dean Jenkins; Mike Carr; Paul Lohnes; Tom Mulligan
- 1980–81: Dean Jenkins; Mike Carr; Paul Lohnes
- 1981–82: Ken Kaiser; Mike Carr; Paul Lohnes
- 1982–83: Mike Carr; Rob Spath

=== Hockey East ===
==== Individual awards ====
Player of the Year

- Dwayne Roloson: 1994
- Kevin Boyle: 2016

Rookie of the Year

- Greg Bullock: 1994
- Greg Koehler: 1997
- Peter Vetri: 2005
- Scott Wilson: 2012

Goaltending Champions

- Carter Hutton: 2010
- Connor Hellebuyck: 2013
- Kevin Boyle: 2016

Coach of the Year

- Bill Riley Jr.: 1986
- Bruce Crowder: 1994, 1996
- Norm Bazin: 2012, 2013, 2017

Best Defensive Forward

- Doug Nolan: 1999
- Ben Holmstrom: 2010

Len Ceglarski Award

- Shane Henry: 1993
- Danny O'Brien: 2006
- Joe Gambardella: 2016, 2017

Three-Stars Award

- Kevin Boyle: 2016

Tournament Most Valuable Player

- Dwayne Roloson: 1994
- Connor Hellebuyck: 2013, 2014
- Kevin Boyle: 2016
- C. J. Smith: 2018

==== All-Conference teams ====
First Team

- 1986–87: Jon Morris, F
- 1991–92: Mark Richards, G
- 1993–94: Dwayne Roloson, G; Shane Henry, F
- 1994–95: Greg Bullock, F
- 1995–96: Chris Sbrocca, F
- 1996–97: Mike Nicholishen, D; Neil Donovan, F
- 2000–01: Ron Hainsey, D
- 2008–09: Maury Edwards, D
- 2012–13: Chad Ruhwedel, D
- 2013–14: Connor Hellebuyck, G

Second team

- 1984–85: Paul Ames, D
- 1986–87: Dave Delfino, G; Paul Ames, D
- 1987–88: Carl Valimont, G
- 1992–93: Shane Henry, F; Mike Murray, F
- 1993–94: Jean-Francois Aube, F; Greg Bullock, F
- 1997–98: Mike Nicholishen, D
- 1998–99: Anthony Cappelletti, D
- 2001–02: Ed McGrane, F
- 2002–03: Ed McGrane, F
- 2004–05: Ben Walter, F
- 2007–08: Kory Falite, F
- 2009–10: Carter Hutton, G; Jeremy Dehner, D
- 2011–12: Doug Carr, G
- 2012–13: Connor Hellebuyck, G; Joseph Pendenza, F; Riley Wetmore, F
- 2015–16: Kevin Boyle, G
- 2016–17: Michael Kapla, D; Dylan Zink, D; Joe Gambardella, F
- 2021–22: Owen Savory, G

Third Team

- 2021–22: Carl Berglund, F

Rookie Team

- 1984–85: Jon Morris, F
- 1986–87: Randy LeBrasseur, F
- 1988–89: Mark Richards, G
- 1993–94: Greg Bullock, F
- 1996–97: Greg Koehler, F
- 1999–00: Ron Hainsey, D
- 2000–01: Laurent Meunier, F
- 2003–04: Cleve Kinley, D; Jason Tejchma, F
- 2004–05: Peter Vetri, G
- 2007–08: Maury Edwards, D
- 2008–09: David Vallorani, F
- 2011–12: Zack Kamrass, D; Scott Wilson, F
- 2012–13: Connor Hellebuyck, G
- 2013–14: Michael Kapla, D
- 2014–15: C. J. Smith, F
- 2021–22: Matt Crasa, F

== Program records ==
=== Individual ===
==== Season ====
- Most Goals: Jeff Daw; 27 (1994–95)
- Most Assists: Christian Sbrocca; 42 (1995–96)
- Most Points: Greg Bullock; 65 (1994–95)
- Most Points By A Defenseman: Ed Campbell; 38 (1995–96)
- Most Wins: Tyler Wall; 26 (2016–17)
- Most Wins By A Rookie: Tyler Wall; 26 (2016–17)
- Best Goals Against Average: Connor Hellebuyck; 1.37 (2012–13)
- Best Save Percentage: Connor Hellebuyck; .952 (2012–13)
- Most Shutouts: Connor Hellebuyck and Carter Hutton; 6

=== Olympians ===
This is a list of Massachusetts Lowell alumni were a part of an Olympic team.

Name	Position	Massachusetts Lowell Tenure	Team	Year	Finish
Mark Kumpel	Right Wing	1979–1983	(United States) USA	1984	7th
Connor Hellebuyck	Goaltender	2012–2014	(United States) USA	2026	Gold

== Massachusetts–Lowell River Hawks Hall of Fame ==
The following is a list of people associated with the Massachusetts–Lowell men's ice hockey program who were elected into the University of Massachusetts Lowell Athletic Hall of Fame (induction date in parentheses).

- Gary Bishop (1977)
- Mike Geragosian (1981)
- Tom Jacobs (1984)
- Brian Doyle (1985)
- Mike McElligott (1986)
- Paul Lohnes (1987)
- Mike Carr (1988)
- Kevin Charbonneau (1989)
- Robert Kearin (1992)
- Steve Woods (1992)
- Jon Morris (1993)
- Dana Demole (1994)
- Dwayne Roloson (1999)
- 1979 Team (2007)
- 1981 Team (2007)
- 1982 Team (2007)
- Shane Henry (2009)
- Christian Sbrocca (2010)
- Bill Riley Jr. (2013)

== River Hawks in the NHL ==
As of July 1, 2025

= NHL All-Star team	= NHL All-Star	= NHL All-Star and NHL All-Star team	= Hall of Famers

Player	Position	Team(s)	Years	Games	Stanley Cups
Kevin Boyle	Goaltender	ANA	2018–2019	5	0
Lucas Condotta	Center	MTL	2022–Present	11	0
Jeff Daw	Center	COL	2001–2002	1	0
Scott Fankhouser	Goaltender	ATL	1999–2001	23	0
Christian Folin	Defenseman	MIN, LAK, PHI, MTL	2013–2020	244	0
Joseph Gambardella	Center	EDM	2018–2019	15	0
Ron Hainsey	Defenseman	MTL, CBJ, ATL, WIN, CAR, PIT, TOR, OTT	2002–2020	1,132	1
Connor Hellebuyck	Goaltender	WIN	2015–Present	581	0
Ben Holmstrom	Center	PHI	2010–2012	7	0
Carter Hutton	Goaltender	CHI, NSH, STL, BUF, ARI	2012–2022	234	0
Dean Jenkins	Defenseman	LAK	1983–1984	5	0
Michael Kapla	Defenseman	NJD	2016–2017	5	0

Player	Position	Team(s)	Years	Games	Stanley Cups
Greg Koehler	Center	CAR	2000–2001	1	0
Mark Kumpel	Forward	QUE, DET, WPG	1984–1991	288	0
Andre Lee	Left Wing	LAK	2024–Present	19	0
Craig MacTavish	Center	BOS, EDM, NYR, PHI, STL	1979–1997	1,093	4
Jon Morris	Center	NJD, SJS, BOS	1988–1994	103	0
Bobby Robins	Center	BOS	2014–2015	3	0
Dwayne Roloson	Goaltender	CGY, MIN, EDM, NYI, TBL, BUF	1996–2012	606	0
Chad Ruhwedel	Defenseman	BUF, PIT, NYR	2012–2025	369	0
C. J. Smith	Left wing	BUF, CAR	2016–2022	15	0
Ben Walter	Center	BOS, NYI, NJD	2005–2010	24	0
Scott Wilson	Left wing	PIT, DET, BUF	2014–2020	193	1
Andy Wozniewski	Defenseman	TOR, STL, BOS	2005–2010	79	0

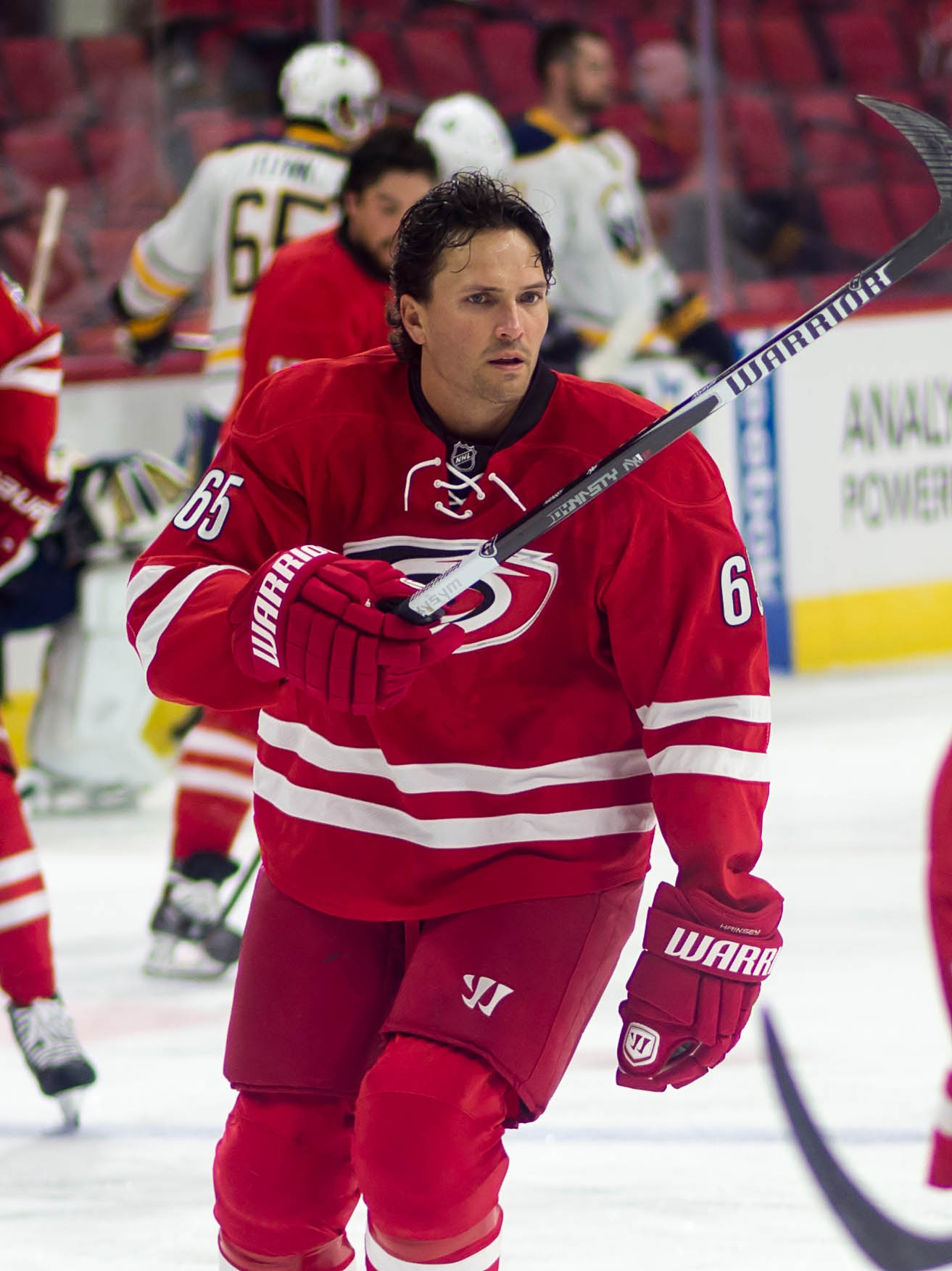
Ron Hainsey

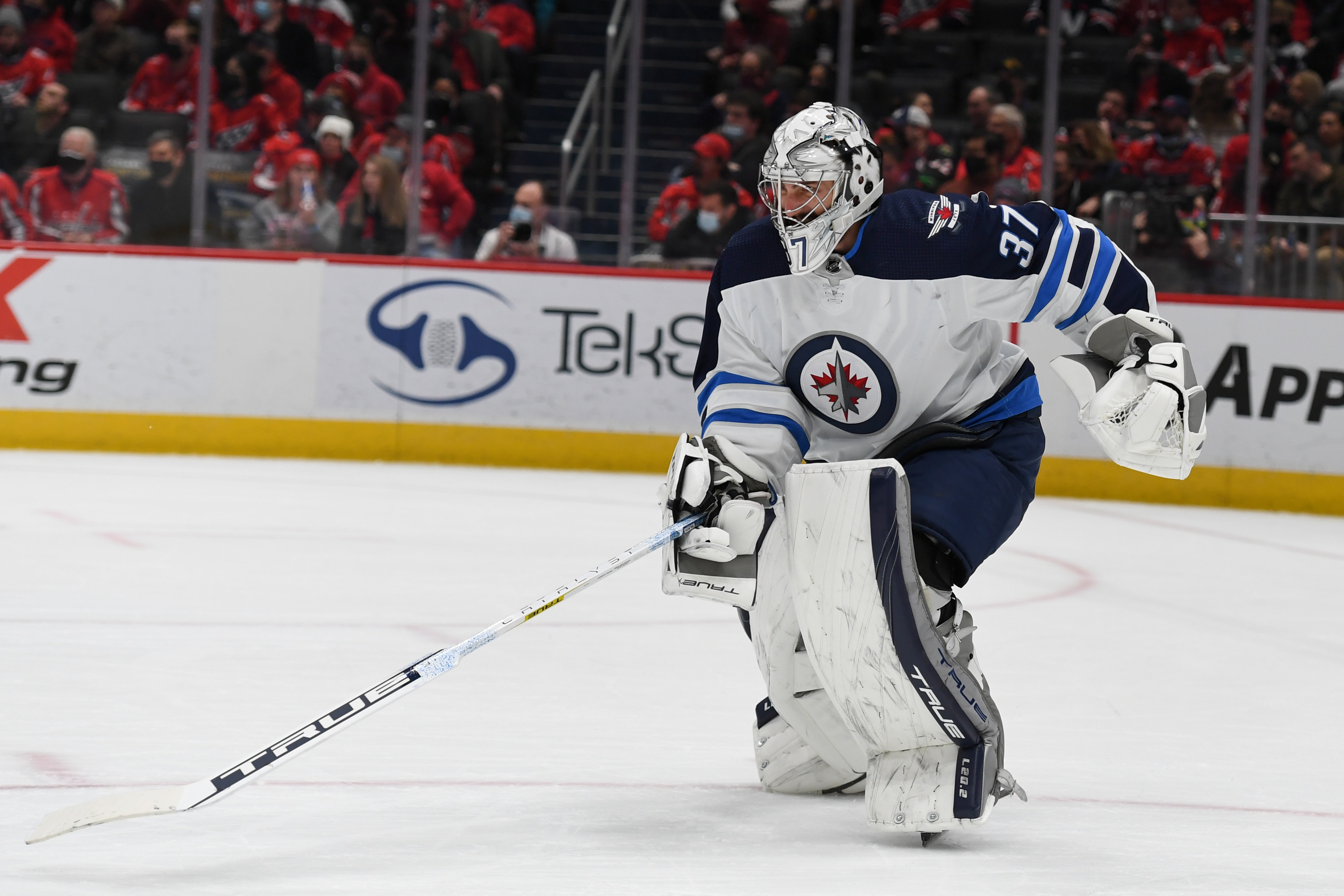
Connor Hellebuyck

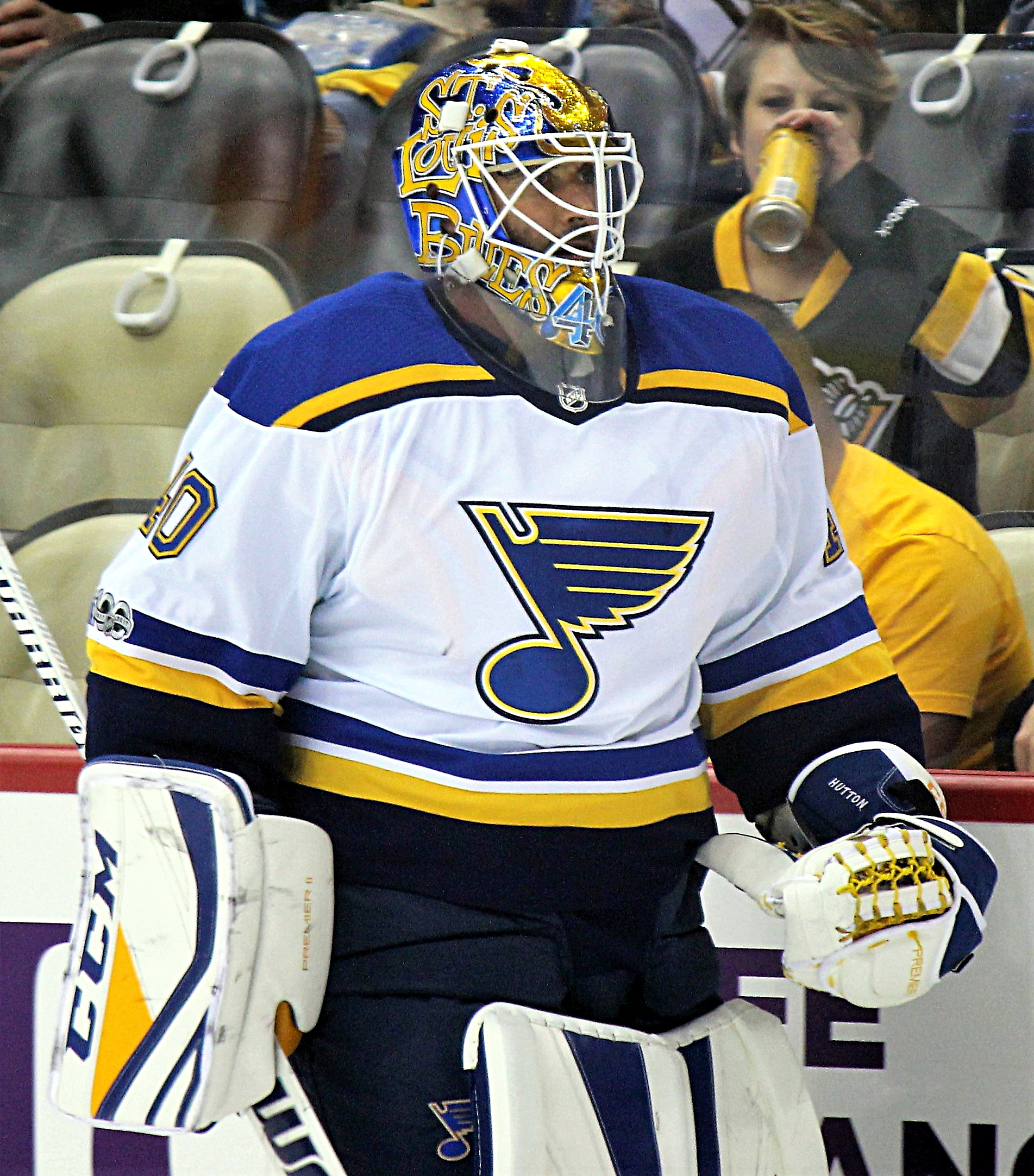
Carter Hutton

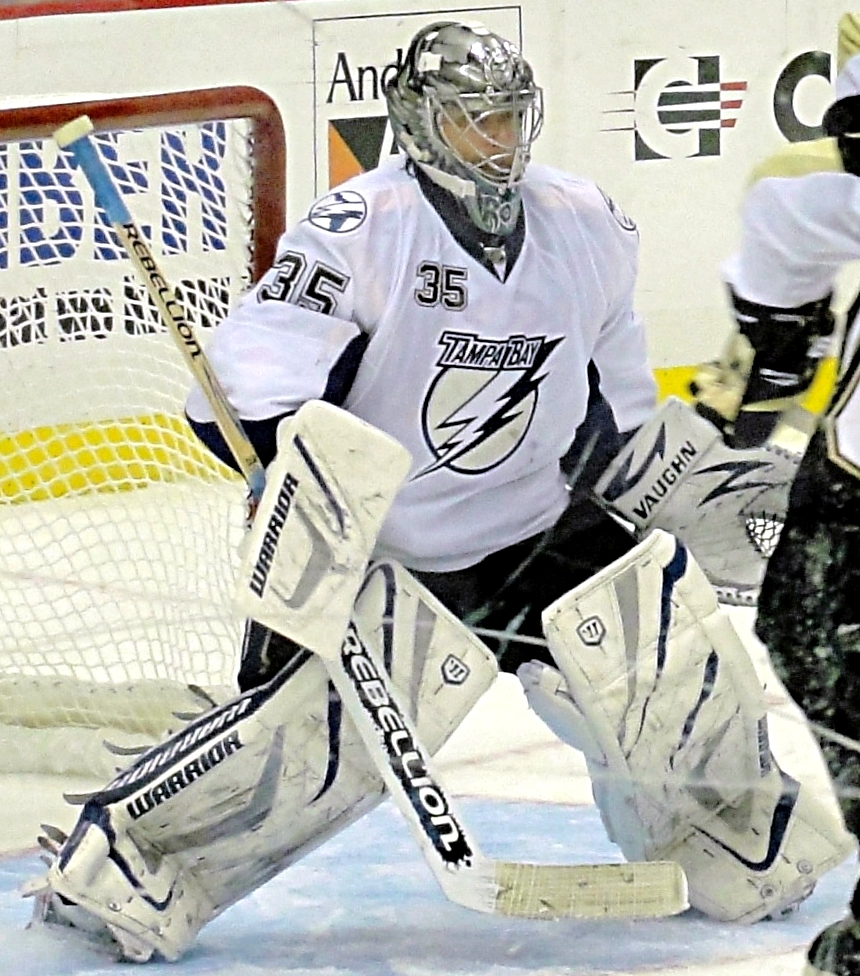
Dwayne Roloson

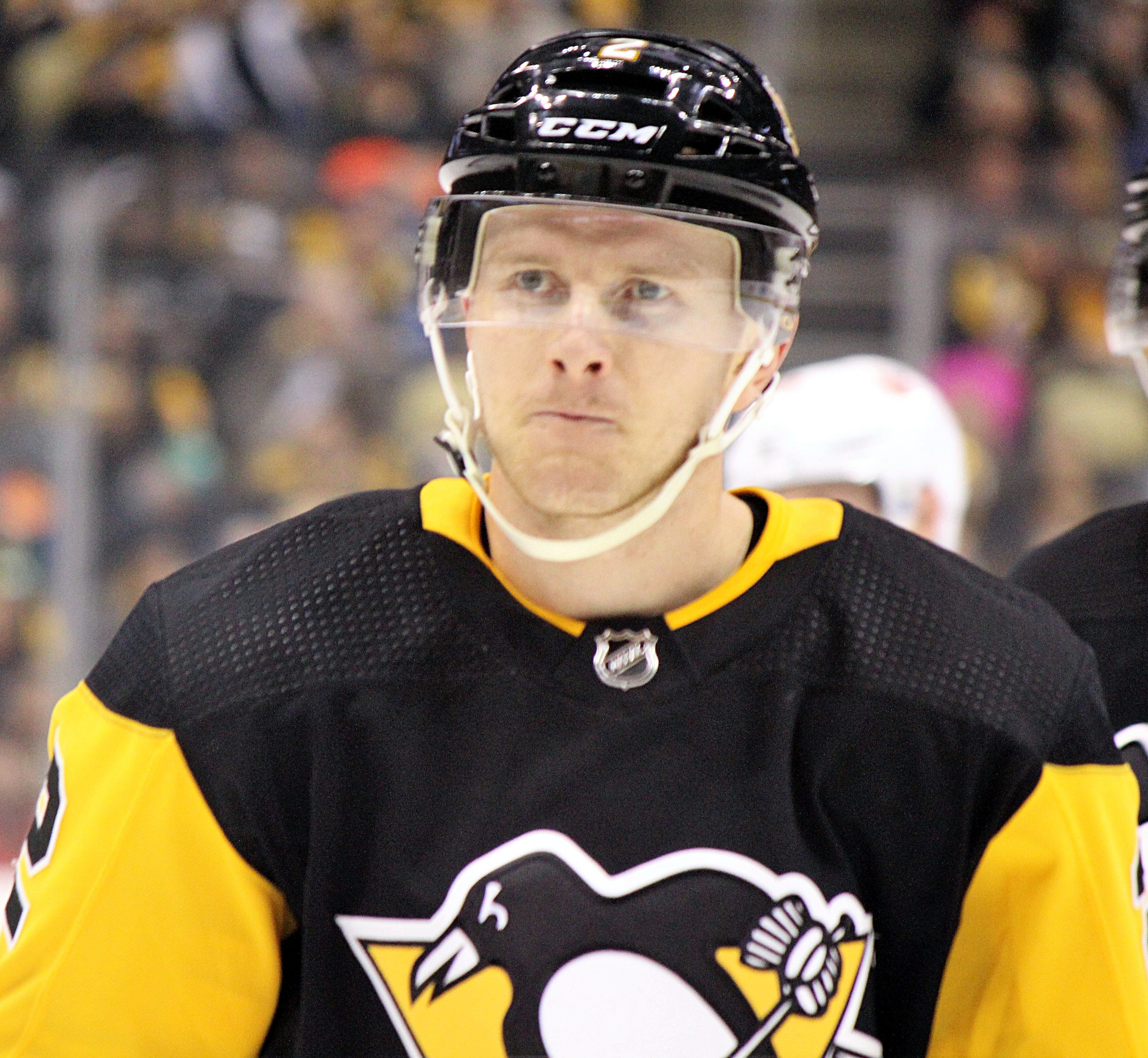
Chad Ruhwedel

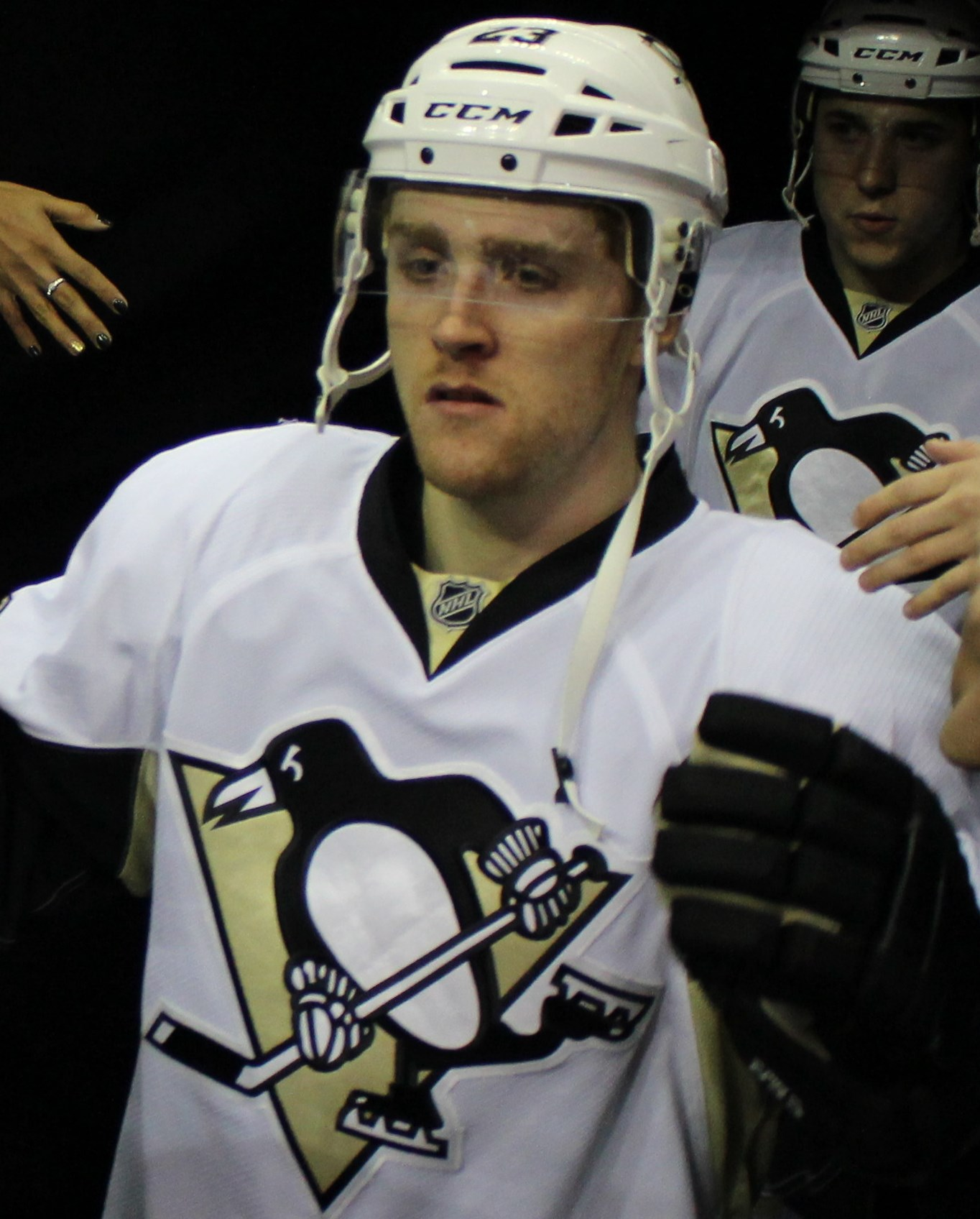
Scott Wilson
