= Renée Elliott =

American businesswoman

- Born: 1964 (age 61–62); Pascagoula, Mississippi, United States
- Education: University of Massachusetts Lowell
- Occupations: Entrepreneur and writer
- Known for: Former CEO of Planet Organic

Renée Elliott (born 1964) is an American businesswoman, former CEO of Planet Organic, and co-founder of Beluga Bean. She is also a writer.

== Early life ==
Elliott was born in Pascagoula, Mississippi, and grew up outside of Boston, Massachusetts. At the University of Massachusetts Lowell, she studied English and minored in health. She moved to England in 1986.

== Career ==
Elliott's first job in business was as an editorial assistant on Wine & Spirit Magazine. During a personal development course in Boston in 1991, Elliott was inspired by visits to different organic stores on her lunch breaks, including Bread & Circus. She felt that there was an opportunity in the UK's organic food market segment and that she wanted to open her own stores in London.

In 1995, Elliott was founded Planet Organic, the UK's first organic and natural food supermarket, in Notting Hill, London. In 2017, Elliott founded her second business, Beluga Bean, with Sam Wigan. The company is a wellbeing enterprise pioneering new strategies for success in business and life. She has promoted wellbeing on the BBC and business publications.

In 2018, Elliott sold a stake of Planet Organic to Inverleith, a Scottish private equity firm in a deal estimated at around $15 million.

In 2023, Elliott returned to Planet Organic to rescue the company from administration, making decisions to move away from mainstream brands, to delist products such as Huel and Little Moons and returning the company to projected profit. She beat Sainsbury's in bidding for the company and has been interviewed by Management Today's Leadership Lessons on her return to the business.

== Additional affiliations ==
Elliott serves on the Soil Association's catering mark standards committee, the Seven Hills Advisory Board for Purpose, the advisory board for Love Ocean, and as a non-executive director for NEMI Teas, a social enterprise.

== Publications ==
- The Top 100 Health Recipes for Babies & Toddlers (2010)
- Me You & the Kids, Too: The Ultimate Time-Saving Cookbook - Every Recipe Feeds the Whole Family (2012)
- What to Eat & How to Eat It: 99 Super Ingredients for a Healthy Life (2017)
- Super Grains, Nuts & Seeds: Truly Modern Recipes for Spelt, Almonds, Quinoa & more (2019)
