= Mike Carr (ice hockey) =

Canadian ice hockey player

- Born: September 25, 1959 (age 67) Burlington, Ontario, Canada
- Height: 5 ft 10 in (178 cm)
- Weight: 175 lb (79 kg; 12 st 7 lb)
- Position: Centre
- Shot: Left
- Played for: SaiPa
- Playing career: 1979–1986

Michael Carr (born September 25, 1959) is a retired professional ice hockey player.

== Career ==
Carr joined the Lowell ice hockey program in 1979 after the team won its first National Championship. As a freshman he led the team in scoring and helped the program reach the conference championship. The squad returned to the national tournament but was stifled in the semifinal and finished the tournament in 3rd place. His scoring numbers dropped by 14 points as a sophomore but the team won its first East Division title. After capturing their second consecutive ECAC 2 East Tournament championship the Chiefs beat Mankato State and Plattsburgh State in two 1-goal games to capture the 1981 national championship. Carr earned a spot on the All-Tournament team for his efforts.

Carr increased his scoring numbers by 20 points for his junior season, helping the team win its first regular season conference championship by going 19–1 in ECAC 2 play. He finished second in the nation in scoring, 3 points behind teammate Ken Kaiser, and led the team to its second consecutive conference championship and national title. Carr was named captain of the squad in his senior season and led the team to an undefeated record in conference play, earning its second regular season title. After winning their third consecutive ECAC 2 tournament the #1 team in the nation was expected to repeat as national champions but bas shut down by RIT in the semifinal and had to settle for third place.

In Carr's four years with Lowell they reached the ECAC 2 championship game and the NCAA tournament each season, finishing with 3 conference titles and 2 national titles. Carr ended his college career as the all-time goal scoring leader at the Division II level with 134 goals in 121 games.

After graduating Carr played briefly for SaiPa in SM-liiga, the top level for Finnish hockey. He returned to North America and played for another three seasons in the Ontario senior league before hanging up his skates.

He was inducted into the Massachusett–Lowell athletic hall of fame in 1988.

== Career statistics ==
			Regular season					Playoffs
Season	Team	League	GP	G	A	Pts	PIM	GP	G	A	Pts	PIM
1979–80	Lowell Chiefs	NCAA	29	38	33	71	—	—	—	—	—	—
1980–81	Lowell Chiefs	NCAA	31	25	32	57	—	—	—	—	—	—
1981–82	Lowell Chiefs	NCAA	22	36	41	77	—	—	—	—	—	—
1982–83	Lowell Chiefs	NCAA	21	35	39	74	—	—	—	—	—	—
1983–84	SaiPa	SM-liiga	8	1	0	1	4	—	—	—	—	—
NCAA totals			121	134	145	279	143	—	—	—	—	—

== Awards and honors ==
Award	Year
All-ECAC 2 Team	1979–80
All-ECAC 2 Team	1980–81
NCAA Division II All-Tournament Team	1981, 1982
All-ECAC 2 Team	1981–82
All-ECAC 2 Team	1982–83
AHCA Division II All-American	1982–83
