= Jeff Daw =

Canadian ice hockey player

- Born: February 28, 1972 (age 53) Carlisle, Ontario, Canada
- Height: 6 ft 3 in (191 cm)
- Weight: 190 lb (86 kg; 13 st 8 lb)
- Position: Centre
- Shot: Right
- Played for: Colorado Avalanche
- NHL draft: Undrafted
- Playing career: 1996–2007

Jeffrey R. Daw (born February 28, 1972) is a Canadian former professional ice hockey centre who played in one National Hockey League game for the Colorado Avalanche during the 2001–02 NHL season. As a youth, he played in the 1986 Quebec International Pee-Wee Hockey Tournament with a minor ice hockey team from Flamborough, Ontario.

== Career statistics ==
=== Regular season and playoffs ===
			Regular season					Playoffs
Season	Team	League	GP	G	A	Pts	PIM	GP	G	A	Pts	PIM
1992–93	UMass Lowell	HE	37	12	18	30	14	—	—	—	—	—
1993–94	UMass Lowell	HE	40	6	12	18	12	—	—	—	—	—
1994–95	UMass Lowell	HE	40	27	15	42	24	—	—	—	—	—
1995–96	UMass Lowell	HE	40	23	28	51	10	—	—	—	—	—
1996–97	Wheeling Nailers	ECHL	13	3	8	11	26	—	—	—	—	—
1996–97	Hamilton Bulldogs	AHL	56	11	8	19	39	19	4	5	9	0
1997–98	Hamilton Bulldogs	AHL	79	28	35	63	20	9	6	3	9	0
1998–99	Hamilton Bulldogs	AHL	66	18	29	47	10	11	0	3	3	4
1999–00	Cleveland Lumberjacks	IHL	9	4	1	5	2	—	—	—	—	—
1999–00	Houston Aeros	IHL	44	9	8	17	12	—	—	—	—	—
1999–00	Lowell Lock Monsters	AHL	10	0	5	5	4	7	1	2	3	6
2000–01	Lowell Lock Monsters	AHL	65	28	28	56	33	3	0	1	1	2
2000–01	Cleveland Lumberjacks	IHL	8	2	3	5	2	—	—	—	—	—
2001–02	Hershey Bears	AHL	79	26	25	51	22	8	1	1	2	4
2001–02	Colorado Avalanche	NHL	1	0	1	1	0	—	—	—	—	—
2002–03	Lowell Lock Monsters	AHL	51	14	16	30	18	—	—	—	—	—
2002–03	Springfield Falcons	AHL	12	2	4	6	2	6	0	2	2	2
2003–04	St. John's Maple Leafs	AHL	67	10	23	33	17	—	—	—	—	—
2004–05	Danbury Trashers	UHL	60	29	47	76	12	11	2	8	10	0
2004–05	Providence Bruins	AHL	—	—	—	—	—	7	0	1	1	2
2005–06	Danbury Trashers	UHL	61	17	55	72	26	18	2	9	11	6
2006–07	Elmira Jackals	UHL	13	5	2	7	8	—	—	—	—	—
NHL totals			1	0	1	1	0	—	—	—	—	—

== See also ==
- List of players who played only one game in the NHL
