= Wildfire Communications =

American software company

Wildfire Communications, Inc
- Industry: Telecommunications
- Founder: Bill Warner; Rich Miner; Nick d'Arbeloff; Tony Lovell
- Fate: Acquired by Orange S.A. in 2000
- Headquarters: Waltham, MA

Wildfire Communications, Inc. was an American company founded in 1992 that developed and sold software and equipment to enhance telephone communications. It created a speech-based electronic secretary in October 1994, pioneering the field of intelligent software assistance accessed completely through the use of natural language. Wildfire is referred to as an early version of Siri, having developed the patent for a "network based knowledgeable assistant" fundamental to voice based telephony.

== Founding ==
Wildfire Communications was founded in 1992 by inventor Bill Warner, vice president of marketing Nick d'Arbeloff, director of engineering Rich Miner, and chief designer Tony Lovell. The company raised two rounds of venture capital funding in 1992 and 1993 to progress from ideas to development to product announcement. In October 1994 the company released its first product, a virtual assistant named "Wildfire."

== The Wildfire Assistant ==
Wildfire had an anthropomorphic voice user interface to let users speak commands over a telephone connection to route calls, handle messages, and perform related tasks. The natural voice prompts encouraged users to think of Wildfire as a real person, a mindset reflected by writers and users commonly speaking of Wildfire as "she." This personification helped foster a quicker understanding of the role Wildfire performed: that of an executive assistant tasked with assisting mobile workers. Though users could also use touchtones to control Wildfire, the system's recorded voice prompts elicited them to speak their commands, reinforcing the interactive model of co-workers on a business call. In early 1996, conference calling and a rudimentary integration with voicemail systems was added to bolster Wildfire's value among corporate users.

== Company sale to Orange ==
In April 2000, Orange purchased Wildfire Communications for $142M.

Orange continued to offer Wildfire to its wireless subscribers until 2005, when it decided to terminate the product due to insufficiently broad use. Orange customers passionate about Wildfire, particularly those with disabilities who found the speech interface empowering, complained with sufficient force to cause a month's delay in shut-off, but Orange did indeed kill the service in July, 2005.

== Technological legacy ==
Wildfire directly influenced several widely used voice user interface-based systems through the work of Blade Kotelly, who moved from a position in usability testing at Wildfire Communications to become Creative Director of Interface Design for SpeechWorks, where he designed richly anthropomorphic systems for United Airlines, E-Trade and other clients. Kotelly wrote of the importance in his design philosophy of creating seemingly human personas for his applications, and said that Wildfire was the best persona he'd seen in a product.

Wildfire has also been cited as "a really early version of Siri mostly geared for business execs" and similarities have also been drawn between Wildfire's relaxed conversational style and that of the Apple assistant.
