= Jon Morris (ice hockey) =

American ice hockey player (born 1966)

- Born: May 6, 1966 (age 60) Lowell, Massachusetts, U.S.
- Height: 6 ft 0 in (183 cm)
- Weight: 175 lb (79 kg; 12 st 7 lb)
- Position: Center
- Shot: Right
- Played for: New Jersey Devils; San Jose Sharks; Boston Bruins; HC Gherdëina; Ratingen Lions
- National team: United States
- Playing career: 1981–1994

Jon Morris (born May 6, 1966) is an American retired ice hockey center who played in the National Hockey League (NHL) for the New Jersey Devils, San Jose Sharks, and Boston Bruins between 1988 and 1994. Internationally Morris played for the United States at the 1995 World Championships.

== Career ==
Morris was chosen 86th overall by the New Jersey Devils in the 1984 NHL Draft after posting 81 points in 24 games for Chelmsford High School. He then spent four years at the University of Massachusetts Lowell, where he played for the UMass Lowell River Hawks men's ice hockey team. He was placed on the Hockey East first all-star team in 1987. After playing in four games with the Devils in 1988 and 1989, he returned to the AHL's Utica Devils and played in 20 games with New Jersey the following season. Morris was signed by the San Jose Sharks in March 1993, and the Boston Bruins acquired him in a trade that October. In 103 career NHL games from 1988–89 to 1993–94, he scored 16 goals and had 33 assists.

== Career statistics ==
=== Regular season and playoffs ===
			Regular season					Playoffs
Season	Team	League	GP	G	A	Pts	PIM	GP	G	A	Pts	PIM
1981–82	Chelmsford High School	HS-MA	—	—	—	—	—	—	—	—	—	—
1982–83	Chelmsford High School	HS-MA	—	—	—	—	—	—	—	—	—	—
1983–84	Chelmsford High School	HS-MA	24	31	50	81	—	—	—	—	—	—
1984–85	University of Massachusetts Lowell	HE	42	29	31	60	16	—	—	—	—	—
1985–86	University of Massachusetts Lowell	HE	39	25	31	56	52	—	—	—	—	—
1986–87	University of Massachusetts Lowell	HE	35	28	33	61	48	—	—	—	—	—
1987–88	University of Massachusetts Lowell	HE	37	15	39	54	39	—	—	—	—	—
1988–89	New Jersey Devils	NHL	4	0	2	2	0	—	—	—	—	—
1989–90	New Jersey Devils	NHL	20	6	7	13	8	6	1	3	4	23
1989–90	Utica Devils	AHL	49	27	37	64	6	—	—	—	—	—
1990–91	New Jersey Devils	NHL	53	9	19	28	27	5	0	4	4	2
1990–91	Utica Devils	AHL	6	4	2	6	5	—	—	—	—	—
1991–92	New Jersey Devils	NHL	7	1	2	3	6	—	—	—	—	—
1991–92	Utica Devils	AHL	7	1	4	5	0	—	—	—	—	—
1992–93	New Jersey Devils	NHL	2	0	0	0	0	—	—	—	—	—
1992–93	San Jose Sharks	NHL	13	0	3	3	6	—	—	—	—	—
1992–93	Utica Devils	AHL	31	16	24	40	28	—	—	—	—	—
1992–93	Cincinnati Cyclones	IHL	18	7	19	26	24	—	—	—	—	—
1993–94	Boston Bruins	NHL	4	0	0	0	0	—	—	—	—	—
1993–94	Kansas City Blades	IHL	3	0	3	3	2	—	—	—	—	—
1993–94	Providence Bruins	AHL	67	22	44	66	20	—	—	—	—	—
1994–95	HC Gherdëina	ITA	35	28	41	69	36	3	1	3	4	0
1995–96	Ratingen Lions	DEL	4	2	4	6	4	—	—	—	—	—
AHL totals			160	70	111	181	59	—	—	—	—	—
NHL totals			103	16	33	49	47	11	1	7	8	25

=== International ===
Year	Team	Event	GP	G	A	Pts	PIM
1995	United States	WC	6	3	5	8	4
Senior totals			6	3	5	8	4

== Awards and honors ==
Award	Year
All-Hockey East Rookie Team	1984–85
Hockey East All-Tournament Team	1985
All-Hockey East First Team	1986–87
AHCA East Second-Team All-American	1986–87
