= Bob Bachelder =

American orchestra leader and educator

- Born: Robert E. Bachelder; May 15, 1925; Lowell, Massachusetts, U.S.
- Died: May 5, 2015 (aged 89); Burlington, Massachusetts, U.S.
- Occupations: Bandleader; Educator; Musician

Robert E. "Bob" Bachelder (May 15, 1925 – May 5, 2015) was an American orchestra leader and educator. He learned to play several instruments, primarily drums then piano, and started a band as a serviceman during World War II. In 1953 while in college his band had a national hit with "TV Rhumba". His band became the house band of the Totem Pole Ballroom, Boston's premier dancing location, in 1955, and remained there until the venue closed in 1964. While leading the band, Bob pursued studies in education and held several teaching and educational administrative positions, including as Assistant Superintendent of Melrose Public Schools. He re-formed his big band in 1989 and continued on a part-time basis for several years, including events televised in the Boston area.

== Early life and education ==
Robert E. Bachelder was born in Lowell, Massachusetts, on May 15, 1925. His father, Frank Bachelder, was a United States Secret Service agent who had played drums previously. His mother, Gertrude née Reardon, was a bookkeeper. Both of his parents supported Bachelder's early interest in music, in particular his mother who played piano. Bachelder's first instrument was drums, like his father, yet his father discouraged Bob from pursuing a career in music. He attended Malden Catholic High School, but left at age 17 to join the Army Air Force as a pilot during World War II. While in the military Bachelder formed a band as a drummer.

Bacheleder graduated from Lowell State College with a bachelor’s degree in elementary and music education in 1954.

== Career ==
Upon returning home from military service Bachelder became a professional musician, switching his primary instrument from drums to piano. His band began to attract a loyal following beginning in 1950 when he regularly performed at the Commodore Ballroom in Lowell. He studied elementary education and music education at Lowell State College, graduating in 1954, and then commenced his educational career as a music teacher at Newton Public Schools. While in college he developed a decided interest in arranging. His band was booked into several hotels and dance halls, the most important being the Totem Pole. The next year his band became the house band at the Totem Pole. He was not strictly limited to this venue, but would take his band to bookings at other New England locations. Many of the band's charts were arranged by Bachelder, giving the band its own distinctive sound.

During the day, he taught English at the Melrose school district. He would receive a master's degree in counseling from Tufts University in the mid-1950s. He became a psychologist for the Massachusetts Division of Youth Services for a short time. He returned to teaching in 1957 when he went to Melrose as an English instructor. He founded Melrose's guidance program in addition to his teaching duties, as he was concerned that those with special needs and intellectual giftedness were being neglected.

Bachelder kept his educational and musical life separate, and many people familiar with one aspect were completely unaware of the other. Bachelder kept the position of house band at the Totem Pole until it shut down in 1964. Within six months, Bachelder also dissolved his big band. After disbanding The Totem Pole big band he continued to play in small groups such as the Bob Bachelder Trio as a side-hobby. He continued to pursue further achievement in education, earning a Doctorate in Education Administration from Boston University in 1970.

Following retirement in 1988 as assistant school superintendent at Melrose, Bachelder re-formed the Totem Pole big band in 1989, using several members who had played in the original iteration of the group. This band played at public concerts, private events, and provided live background music at WGBH-TV's fundraising broadcast. Although retired from administration, he continued his educational activities, teaching at Salem State College.

== Recordings ==
Bachelder's hit was "TV Rhumba", released on Mood Records #1011. The record was produced by Norm Prescott as a favor to Bachelder, who was experiencing financial challenges while in college. Billboard gave favorable reviews to the side, which consisted of television show themes and commercial jingles. The other side of the single was Cheek to Cheek. The record's sales were boosted by publicity from the Billboard review, but quickly fell when the Chicago Tribune detailed how WGN had banned airplay of the record because of music licensing concerns. It was also assumed that some stations would not promote the record because it contained themes from shows in competition to their own programming. Mood Records quickly announced that all copyright licensing was cleared, and that information to the contrary had been spread by other record companies.

Shows and advertisements included in the medley:

- Arthur Godfrey's Talent Scouts
- The Dinah Shore Show
- Dragnet
- Gillette
- The Kate Smith Hour
- Lucky Strike
- Martin Kane, Private Eye
- The Perry Como Chesterfield Show
- The Red Buttons Show

The record entered the Billboard Hot 100 on July 18, 1953, and stayed for three weeks, peaking at position 22. In addition to this record, Bachelder made several pseudonymous recordings on various budget albums, with titles such as "A Tribute to Glenn Miller".

== Personal life ==
Bob Bachelder was married twice. His first wife was Geraldine Reid of Medford Massachusetts. He met his second wife, Elaine Pray, a kindergarten teacher, while an administrator of the school district. He had two daughters and one son.

He suffered a heart attack and developed pneumonia, the complications from which led to his death on May 5, 2015, at Lahey Hospital & Medical Center.
