= Chad Ruhwedel =

American ice hockey player (born 1990)

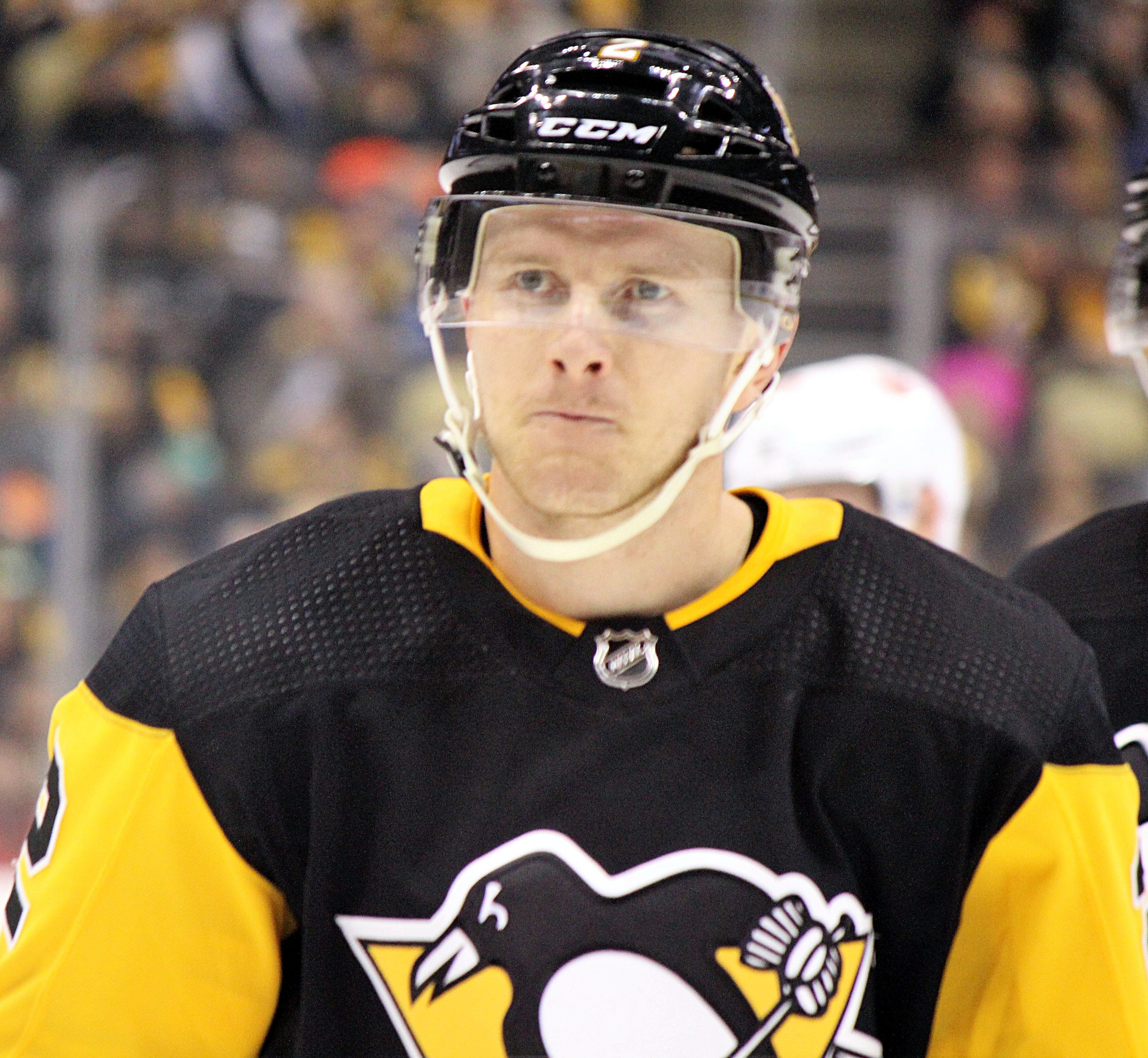
- Ruhwedel with the Pittsburgh Penguins in 2018
- Born: May 7, 1990 (age 36) San Diego, California, U.S.
- Height: 5 ft 11 in (180 cm)
- Weight: 188 lb (85 kg; 13 st 6 lb)
- Position: Defense
- Shot: Right
- Played for: Buffalo Sabres; Pittsburgh Penguins; New York Rangers
- NHL draft: Undrafted
- Playing career: 2013–2025

Chad James Ruhwedel (born May 7, 1990) is an American former professional ice hockey player. He played as a defenseman for 13 seasons in the National Hockey League (NHL) with the Buffalo Sabres, Pittsburgh Penguins, and New York Rangers.

== Playing career ==
=== Amateur ===
Ruhwedel started playing youth ice hockey at the San Diego Ice Arena while a resident of Scripps Ranch. He later played for the San Diego Junior Gulls and La Jolla Jaguars as a youth, before playing for the Los Angeles Kings U18 AAA team. After juniors, he played for the Sioux Falls Stampede of the USHL, earning a Division I college hockey scholarship to UMass Lowell. Ruhwedel played at UMass Lowell from 2010 to 2013. He was named to the Hockey East All-Academic Team in 2010–11, 2011–12, and 2012–13. In 2011–12 he was a Hockey East Honorable Mention All-Star, and in 2012–13 he was a Hockey East First-Team All-Star, and an AHCA East First-Team All-American. He also won the Bob Monahan Award as the best defenseman in New England.

=== Buffalo Sabres ===
On April 13, 2013, Ruhwedel signed a two-year entry-level contract as an undrafted free agent with the Buffalo Sabres. He made his NHL debut that night against the Philadelphia Flyers as a replacement for an injured Tyler Myers. Over his seven games with the Sabres, he record no points, no penalties, and finished with an even plus-minus rating.

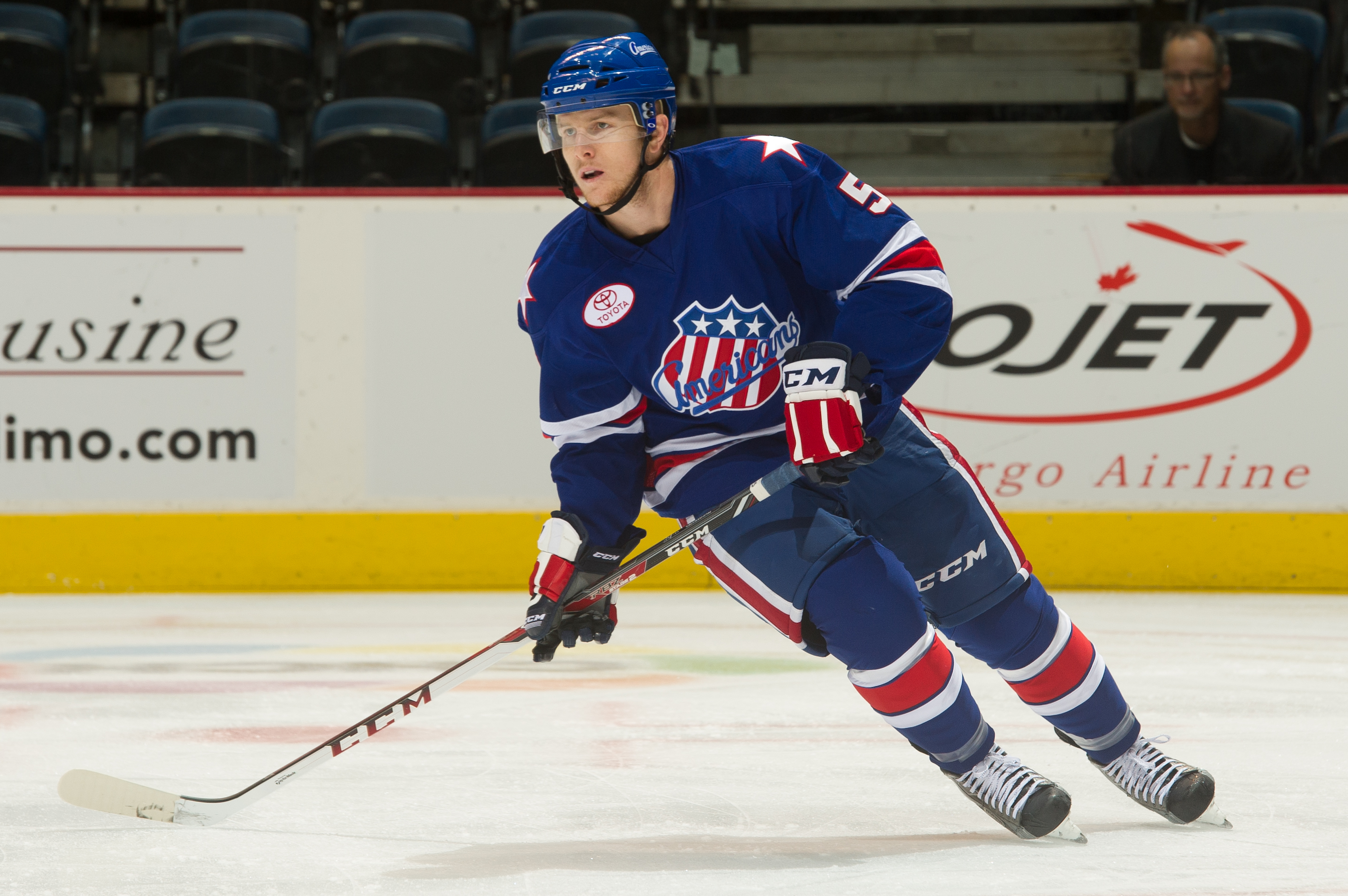
Ruhwedel with the Rochester Americans in 2013.

Ruhwedel returned to Buffalo in July to participate in the Sabres’ development camp but was not expected to make their opening night roster. On September 23, Ruhwedel was reassigned to the Sabres American Hockey League (AHL) affiliate, the Rochester Americans, to start the 2013–14 season. Through his first month in the AHL, Ruhwedel was often paired with Brayden McNabb and played in all situations including the power play and penalty kill. Ruhwedel accumulated two goals and two assists for four points through October and early November. In December, Ruhwedel competed with Rochester at the 2013 Spengler Cup. While Ruhwedel was finding success in the AHL, the Sabres maintained a losing 7–23–3 record and had fired coach Ron Rolston and general manager Darcy Regier. On December 17, Ruhwedel was recalled to the NHL level as part of an ongoing player evaluation being conducted by interim coach Ted Nolan. At the time of the recall, Ruhwedel had recorded four goals and 10 assists for 14 points through 26 games. He earned another recall to the NHL level in January but recorded no points over seven games.

Ruhwedel was recalled to the NHL level on March 8, 2014, after Alexander Sulzer suffered a lower-body injury. He recorded his first career NHL assist off a goal by Jamie McBain on April 4. The following game Ruhwedel suffered a concussion after Philadelphia Flyers forward Zac Rinaldo delivered a hit to the head during a game. As a result of the hit, Rinaldo received a four-game suspension and Ruhwedel was sidelined for the remainder of the season. While recovering from the concussion, Ruhwedel signed a two-year contract extension to remain with the Sabres organization. As a restricted free agent, he had previously received a qualifying offer from the Sabres the month before to retain his playing rights. Ruhwedel finished the 2013–14 season with one assist at the NHL level and 28 points with the Rochester Americans.

=== Pittsburgh Penguins ===
At the conclusion of his contract with the Sabres, on July 1, 2016, Ruhwedel signed as a free agent to a one-year, two-way deal with the reigning Stanley Cup champions, the Pittsburgh Penguins. He scored his first National Hockey League goal on December 23, 2016, in a 4–1 victory over the New Jersey Devils. He split his time during 2016–17 season playing 28 games in minors for Wilkes-Barre/Scranton Penguins, and 34 games Pittsburgh in the NHL. He would play six playoff games. Ruhwedel suffered a concussion in game four of the Eastern Conference Final against the Ottawa Senators, and missed the rest of the season. The Penguins would go on to win the Stanley Cup for the second straight season; since Ruhwedel spent 1/3 of the season in the American Hockey League (AHL), he did not get his name on the cup. Pittsburgh did give him a day with the Stanley Cup, and a Stanley Cup ring.

On June 22, 2017, the Penguins re-signed Ruhwedel to a two-year, $1.3 million extension with an annual average value of $650,000.

On February 19, 2022, the Penguins re-signed Ruhwedel to a two-year, $1.6 million extension with an annual average value of $800,000.

=== New York Rangers ===
On March 8, 2024, Ruhwedel was traded to the New York Rangers in exchange for a 2027 fourth-round pick.

Following a 2024–25 season spent primarily with the Rangers' AHL affiliate, the Hartford Wolf Pack, Ruhwedel announced his retirement on August 12, 2025.

== Personal life ==
Ruhwedel was raised in the Scripps Ranch area of San Diego and attended Scripps Ranch High School, where he starred on the roller hockey team.

== Career statistics ==
			Regular season					Playoffs
Season	Team	League	GP	G	A	Pts	PIM	GP	G	A	Pts	PIM
2007–08	Los Angeles Jr. Kings	18U AAA
2008–09	Sioux Falls Stampede	USHL	55	0	11	11	30	4	0	1	1	4
2009–10	Sioux Falls Stampede	USHL	58	5	17	22	55	3	0	1	1	2
2010–11	UMass Lowell River Hawks	HE	32	2	13	15	10	—	—	—	—	—
2011–12	UMass Lowell River Hawks	HE	37	6	19	25	26	—	—	—	—	—
2012–13	UMass Lowell River Hawks	HE	41	7	16	23	20	—	—	—	—	—
2012–13	Buffalo Sabres	NHL	7	0	0	0	0	—	—	—	—	—
2013–14	Rochester Americans	AHL	47	4	24	28	22	5	2	3	5	4
2013–14	Buffalo Sabres	NHL	21	0	1	1	2	—	—	—	—	—
2014–15	Rochester Americans	AHL	72	10	26	36	22	—	—	—	—	—
2014–15	Buffalo Sabres	NHL	4	0	1	1	0	—	—	—	—	—
2015–16	Rochester Americans	AHL	59	10	16	26	26	—	—	—	—	—
2015–16	Buffalo Sabres	NHL	1	0	0	0	2	—	—	—	—	—
2016–17	Wilkes-Barre/Scranton Penguins	AHL	28	4	12	16	12	—	—	—	—	—
2016–17	Pittsburgh Penguins	NHL	34	2	8	10	8	6	0	0	0	4
2017–18	Pittsburgh Penguins	NHL	44	2	3	5	16	12	0	0	0	2
2018–19	Pittsburgh Penguins	NHL	18	1	1	2	4	—	—	—	—	—
2018–19	Wilkes-Barre/Scranton Penguins	AHL	5	1	4	5	2	—	—	—	—	—
2019–20	Pittsburgh Penguins	NHL	41	2	4	6	12	—	—	—	—	—
2020–21	Pittsburgh Penguins	NHL	17	0	2	2	14	—	—	—	—	—
2021–22	Pittsburgh Penguins	NHL	78	4	9	13	14	7	0	0	0	0
2022–23	Pittsburgh Penguins	NHL	47	1	4	5	18	—	—	—	—	—
2023–24	Pittsburgh Penguins	NHL	47	1	3	4	4	—	—	—	—	—
2023–24	New York Rangers	NHL	5	0	0	0	0	—	—	—	—	—
2024–25	New York Rangers	NHL	5	0	1	1	0	—	—	—	—	—
2024–25	Hartford Wolf Pack	AHL	50	3	15	18	42	—	—	—	—	—
NHL totals			369	13	37	50	94	25	0	0	0	6

== Awards and honors ==
Award	Year	Ref
USHL
All-Star Game	2010	
College
Hockey East First Team	2013	
AHCA East First-Team All-American	2013	
Hockey East All-Tournament Team	2013	
