= Monicazation =

Nigerian musical artist

- Born: Monica Omorodion Swaida
- Origin: Edo, Nigeria
- Genres: Pop; R&B; Hip Hop Soul; Soul; Blues; Rock
- Occupations: Singer, songwriter
- Instrument: Vocals
- Years active: 2007 –present

Monica Omorodion Swaida (born 5 June) known as Monicazation, is a Nigerian-American singer, actress, film producer and CEO of an insurance company.

== Early life ==
Swaida was born in England and raised in Warri, Nigeria. She attended Nana Primary school, Warri, and secondary school at Mount Wachusett Community College in Gardner, Massachusetts.

She started singing as a teenager and, at the age of 14, won a song writing competition with Punch Newspapers, which took her to Lagos where her musical career started.

While at the University of Massachusetts Lowell, Swaida was the dance leader at Alumni association. She led her group and did live shows at the university and she wrote poetry in the drama club that was published. She listened and learned from her mentors such as Majek Fashek to improve her music.

== Career ==
=== Singer ===
Swaida started singing as a teenager and was introduced to the music studio by Sam Morris of Otto records. This led her to Aibtonia studio, where she met her first band member of Sound on Sound, and was signed by Poligram records. She also met Majek Fashek and many other crews and used to be in studios during her school breaks. She opened for Majek Fashek, Onyeka, Christie Essien, and many other artists, and went on tours as a teen with Majek Fashek. Monicazation released her full album titled Monicazation in September 2014 and went on tours with different artists.

As a teenager, she met Majek Fashek at Aibitonia Studios at Anthony in Lagos. At that time, she was part of a group called ‘Sound on Sound’ with an American called Scratch and three other singers who released their first album with Poligram Records. Majek Fashek taught her a lot about songwriting and eliminated her stage fears. She met Sunny Okosun during the "MAMSER" tour with Majek and became friends with his backup singers. When Majek was taking breaks from long tours, she decided to go with Sunny Okosun. Anytime she was on a break with Majek, she went with Okosun and also learned from him.

=== Actress ===
Swaida has acted in various feature films including, Affairs of the Heart with Joseph Benjamin, and Stella Damasus in 2014, and then played the lead in a film written by director Obed Joe titled Burning Love in 2014. She later produced her award-winning film titled Faces of Love with Robert Peters starring Razaaq Adoti, Syr Law, John Dumelo among many others. Swaida, an insurance business owner, returned to her entertainment roots after four years. Faces of Love is only the second movie she produced and her first to receive an award. She also served as a co-executive producer and wrote the soundtrack. She decided to take on the responsibility to promote art that can convey the "true" images of African people.

== Personal life ==
Swaida started writing poems and music while she was a teenager. While in Nana Primary school Warri, Monica was writing songs with her younger sister. They used to sing and rap even before she knew anything about rapping. She first fell in love with drama while in Hussey College Warri. She joined a theater group called Silver Line Productions with Felix Okwelum as the theatre director in Warri. She acted on stage doing dramatic poetry such as Abiku. She also acted in plays like The Gods Are Not To Blame, House Asunder, and many more. She toured with Silver Line Production for years before focusing more on music. She did background singing for stars including Majek Fashek, Sunny Okosun, and Evi Edna. She also did lots of jingles and voice-over work. She toured extensively with Majek Fashek's band all over Nigeria and Africa and her fondest experience was when they played at the Oba Palace in Benin. Swaida was best known in the 1990s, along with the likes of Evi Edna, Majek Fashek, and the late Sunny Okosun. She owns an insurance company and is married to an American citizen.

== Discography ==
=== Selected singles ===
- "TGIF" (2017)
- "Under Your Influence" (2016)
- "Jesus" (2015)
- "Mambo" (2015)
- "Moved On" (2015)
- "Na You" (2015)
- "Palava Dey" (2015)
- "My Baby Is Gone" (2015)

== Awards and nominations ==
=== Awards ===
- Academia Music Award California (2015)

=== Nominations ===
- Golden Icons Academy Movie Awards
- LANFA MOVIE AND MUSIC AWARD
- Nollywood & African Film Critics' Awards People's Choice Award – Faces of Love (2015)
