= Dean Jenkins =

American ice hockey player

- Born: November 21, 1959 (age 66) Billerica, Massachusetts, U.S.
- Height: 6 ft 0 in (183 cm)
- Weight: 190 lb (86 kg; 13 st 8 lb)
- Position: Right wing
- Shot: Right
- Played for: Los Angeles Kings
- NHL draft: Undrafted
- Playing career: 1981–1985

Dean F. Jenkins (born November 21, 1959, in Billerica, Massachusetts) is an American former ice hockey player who played in five games during the 1983–84 season for the Los Angeles Kings in the National Hockey League (NHL). The rest of his career, which lasted from 1981 to 1985, was spent in the American Hockey League.

== Career statistics ==
=== Regular season and playoffs ===
			Regular season					Playoffs
Season	Team	League	GP	G	A	Pts	PIM	GP	G	A	Pts	PIM
1977–78	University of Massachusetts Lowell	NCAA III	24	11	7	18	28	—	—	—	—	—
1978–79	University of Massachusetts Lowell	NCAA III	33	16	37	53	75	—	—	—	—	—
1979–80	University of Massachusetts Lowell	NCAA III	29	23	42	65	83	—	—	—	—	—
1980–81	University of Massachusetts Lowell	NCAA III	31	23	32	55	83	—	—	—	—	—
1981–82	New Haven Nighthawks	AHL	78	13	22	35	147	4	1	0	1	7
1982–83	New Haven Nighthawks	AHL	80	29	43	72	50	12	6	2	8	40
1983–84	Los Angeles Kings	NHL	5	0	0	0	2	—	—	—	—	—
1983–84	New Haven Nighthawks	AHL	64	24	26	50	131	—	—	—	—	—
1984–85	Hershey Bears	AHL	64	14	32	46	135	—	—	—	—	—
AHL totals			286	80	123	203	463	16	7	2	9	47
NHL totals			5	0	0	0	2	—	—	—	—	—
