= Rich Miner =

American businessman (born 1964)

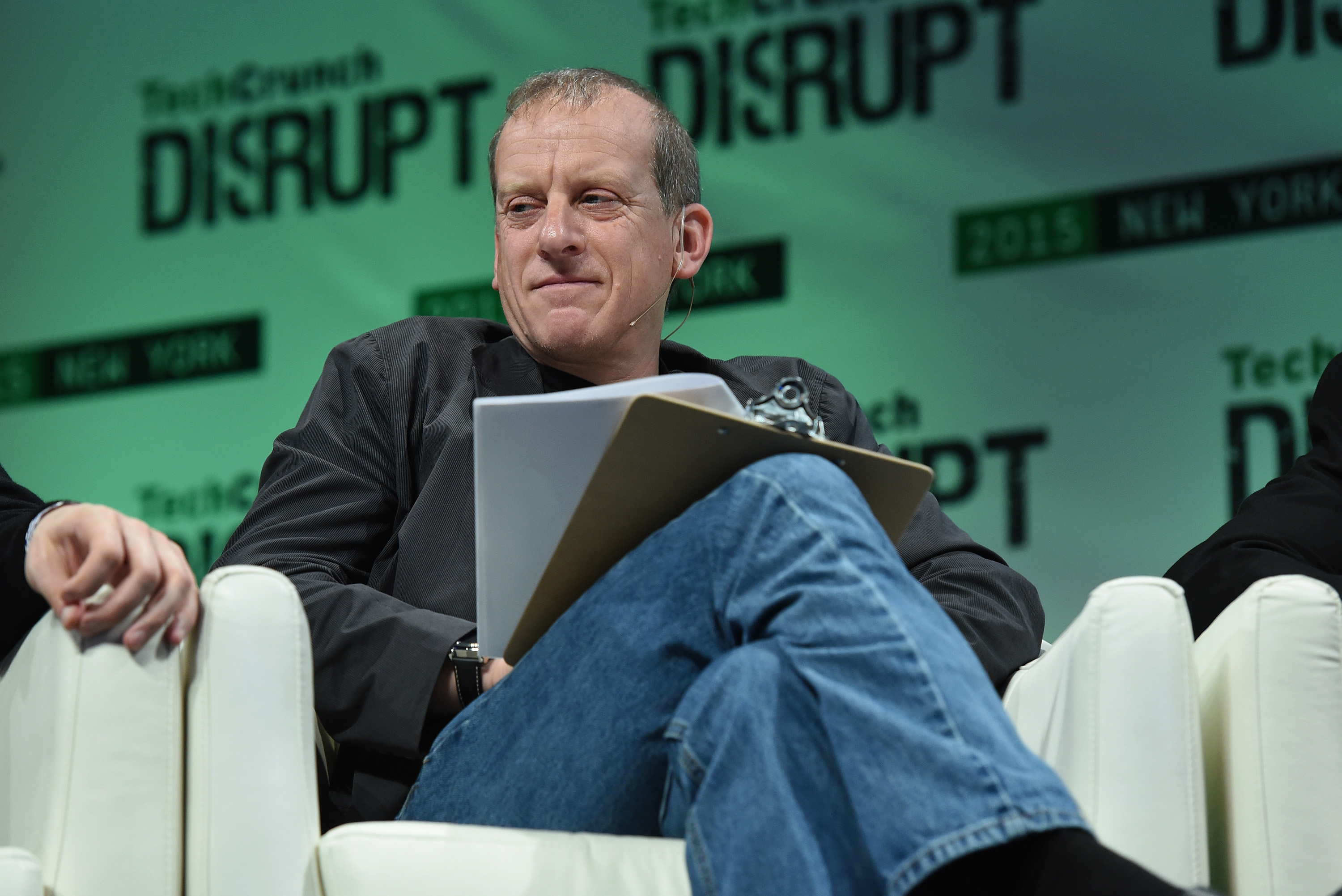
- Miner in 2015
- Education: University of Massachusetts Lowell (Ph.D.)
- Known for: Co-Founder of Android Inc.

Rich Miner (born 1964) is an American investment partner on the GV team.

Based out of Cambridge, MA, Miner joined the GV team in March, 2009. Prior to that, he was a co-founder of Android, Inc., origin of the Android mobile operating system and was an executive on the Android team after its acquisition by Google. Miner also co-founded Wildfire Communications, a voice communications startup that was sold to Orange in April 2000. He has a doctorate in computer science from the University of Massachusetts Lowell. In 2019, Miner was inducted into the Wireless Hall of Fame for his position in the wireless industry. The Richard A. Miner School of Computer & Information Sciences at UMass Lowell was named after Miner in 2022.
