= Planet Organic =

British supermarket chain

- Industry: Supermarket chain
- Founded: 1995; 31 years ago
- Founder: Jonathan Dwek
- Headquarters: London, United Kingdom
- Website: www.planetorganic.com

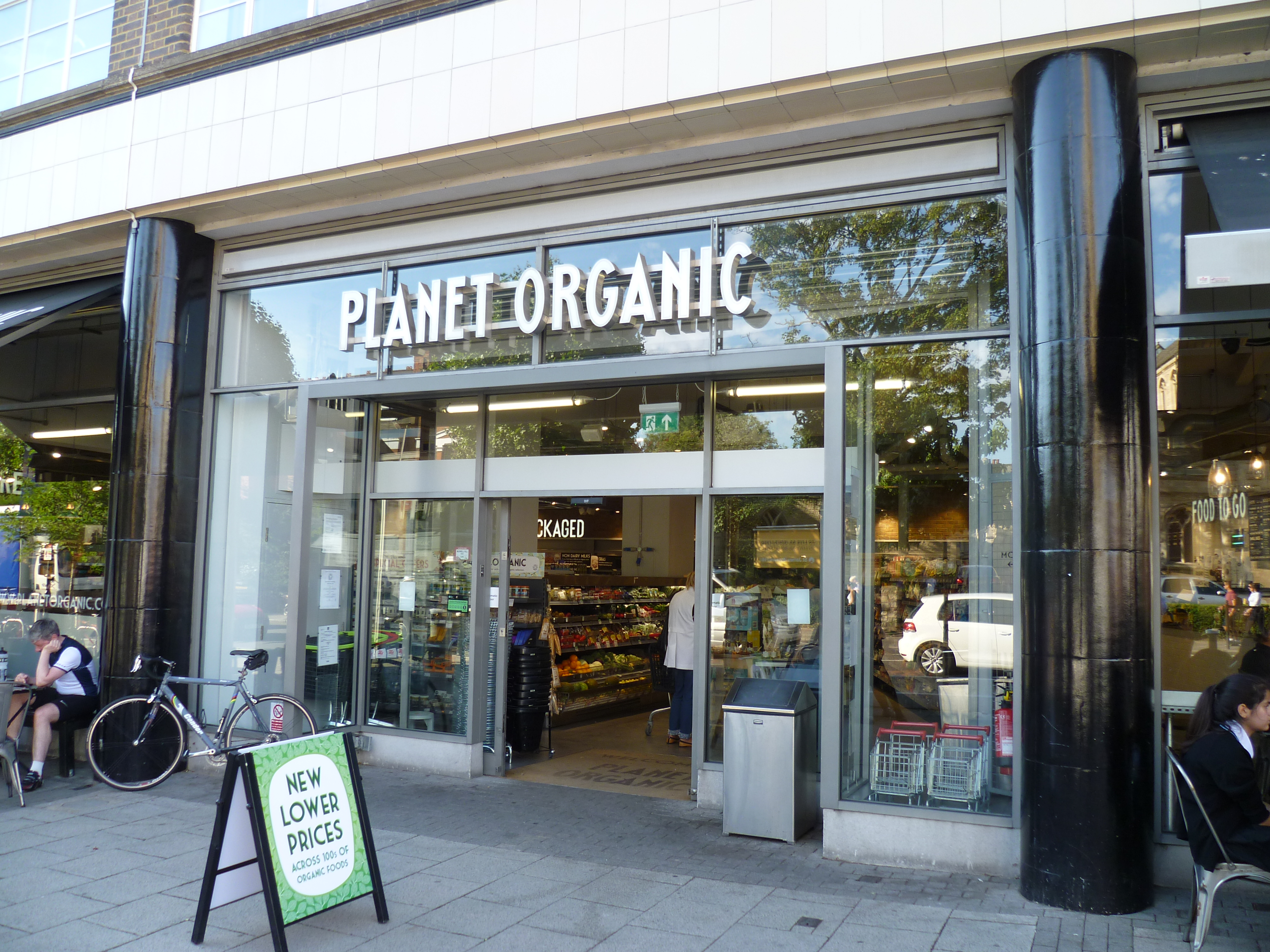
Planet Organic, Muswell Hill, London

Planet Organic is a British organic produce supermarket chain, with eight stores in London as of August 2023.

== History ==
Planet Organic was founded by Jonathan Dwek, son of Joe Dwek, a successful backgammon player. He opened the first store in 1995 in Westbourne Grove, West London. It is reported to have been the UK's first organic supermarket.

Planet Organic is now the UK’s largest fully certified organic supermarket and sells over 8,000 product lines in eight stores within the M25.

In January 2020, Planet Organic announced a partnership with delivery company Supper, offering different dishes to be ordered and delivered from the company's two Tottenham Court Road stores. In 2020, Planet Organic announced plans to double its current store numbers within the next 4 years, expanding its overall number to around 18 stores.

In March 2020, Planet Organic acquired London-based chain As Nature Intended, nearly double the estate owned by Planet Organic.

In May 2023, Planet Organic entered administration and was purchased by its original founders. The majority of the company survived the deal, but it did lead to four stores being closed and the laying-off of 64 staff.
