= List of Denver Pioneers men's ice hockey seasons =

This is a season-by-season list of records compiled by Denver in men's ice hockey.

Denver has won eleven NCAA Men's Division I Ice Hockey Championships in its history, the most ever. Their most recent national championship was in 2026. Denver won the first three NCAA tournaments they participated in (an NCAA record) as well as winning their first seven NCAA tournament games (also a record).

== Season-by-season results ==
Note: GP = Games played, W = Wins, L = Losses, T = Ties

NCAA D-I Champions	NCAA Frozen Four	Conference regular season champions	Conference Playoff Champions

Season	Conference	Regular Season (Note: Code explanation; GP—Games Played, W—Wins, L—Losses, T—Tied games, OTW—Overtime Wins, OTL—Overtime Loses, 3/SW—Win in 3 on 3 overtime or shootout, Pts—Points*)														Conference Tournament Results	National Tournament Results
Season	Conference	Conference									Overall					Conference Tournament Results	National Tournament Results
Season	Conference	GP	W	L	T	OTW	OTL	3/SW	Pts*	Finish	GP	W	L	T	%	Conference Tournament Results	National Tournament Results
Vern Turner (1949 — 1951)
1949–50	Independent	–	–	–	–	–	–	–	–	–	17	4	13	0	.235		
1950–51	Independent	–	–	–	–	–	–	–	–	–	23	11	11	1	.500		
Neil Celley (1951 — 1956)
1951–52	MCHA	19	3	0	0	–	–	–	18	T–2nd	25	18	6	1	.740		
1952–53	MCHA	16	10	6	0	–	–	–	15	4th	24	17	6	1	.729		
1953–54	WIHL	14	7	7	0	–	–	–	11	T–4th	25	16	9	0	.640		
1954–55	WIHL	18	8	9	1	–	–	–	10½	T–4th	30	18	11	1	.617		
1955–56	WIHL	16	6	8	2	–	–	–	10	T–5th	26	12	11	3	.519		
Murray Armstrong (1956 — 1977)
1956–57	WIHL	18	6	11	1	–	–	–	9	5th	28	12	14	2	.464		
1957–58	WIHL	22	12	10	0	–	–	–	16	T–1st	36	24	10	2	.694		Won Semifinal 6–2 (Clarkson); Won Championship 6–2 (North Dakota)
1958–59	Independent	–	–	–	–	–	–	–	–	–	28	22	5	1	.804		
1959–60	WCHA	22	17	4	1	–	–	–	.795	1st	34	27	4	3	.838	Won Final series 12–3 (Colorado College)	Won Semifinal 6–4 (Boston University); Won Championship 5–3 (Michigan Tech)
1960–61	WCHA	18	17	1	0	–	–	–	.944	1st	32	30	1	1	.953	Won Final series 17–3 (Michigan Tech)	Won Semifinal 6–1 (Minnesota); Won Championship 12–2 (St. Lawrence)
1961–62	WCHA	18	11	7	0	–	–	–	.611	3rd	30	17	11	2	.600	Lost First round 4–8 (Michigan)	
1962–63	WCHA	18	12	6	0	–	–	–	.667	T–1st	33	23	9	1	.712	Won First round series 9–2 (Minnesota); Won Championship 5–4 (North Dakota)	Won Semifinal 6–2 (Clarkson); Lost Championship 5–6 (North Dakota)
1963–64	WCHA	10	7	2	1	–	–	–	.750	2nd	31	20	7	4	.710	Won First round series 9–6 (Minnesota); Won Championship 6–2 (Michigan)	Won Semifinal 4–1 (Rensselaer); Lost Championship 3–6 (Michigan)
University Division
1964–65	WCHA	12	4	7	1	–	–	–	.375	6th	28	18	8	2	.679		
1965–66	WCHA	20	10	7	3	–	–	–	.575	4th	32	18	11	3	.609	Won First round 8–2 (Colorado College); Won Second round 5–4 (North Dakota)	Lost Semifinal 3–4 (Clarkson); Won Third-place game 4–3 (Boston University)
1966–67	WCHA	16	11	5	0	–	–	–	.688	2nd	30	22	8	0	.733	Won First round 6–3 (Colorado College); Lost Second round 2–3 (North Dakota)	
1967–68	WCHA	18	15	3	0	–	–	–	.833	1st	34	28	5	1	.838	Won First round 11–4 (Minnesota–Duluth); Won Second round series 16–3 (Minnesota)	Won Semifinal 4–1 (Boston College); Won Championship 4–0 (North Dakota)
1968–69	WCHA	20	14	6	0	–	–	–	.700	2nd	32	26	6	0	.813	Won regional semifinal 4–1 (Minnesota–Duluth); Won Regional Final 3–1 (Colorado College)	Won Semifinal 9–2 (Harvard); Won Championship 4–3 (Cornell)
1969–70	WCHA	22	13	8	0	–	–	–	.614	T–2nd	32	21	10	1	.672	Won regional semifinal 6–2 (Michigan State); Lost Regional Final 2–3 (Wisconsin)	
1970–71	WCHA	22	15	7	0	–	–	–	.682	2nd	36	25	10	1	.708	Won regional semifinal 6–3 (Colorado College); Won Regional Final 9–3 (Minnesota–Duluth)	Lost Semifinal 2–4 (Boston University); Won Third-place game 1–0 (Harvard)
1971–72	WCHA	28	19	9	0	–	–	–	54	1st	38	27	11	0	.711	Won First round Series 11–4 (Notre Dame); Won Second round Series 11–4 (Michigan State)	Lost Semifinal 2–7 (Cornell); Lost Third-place game 2–5 (Wisconsin)
1972–73	WCHA	28	20	8	0	–	–	–	52	1st	39	29	9	1	.756	Won First round Series 9–6 (Minnesota–Duluth); Won Second round Series 7–3 (Michigan Tech)	Won Semifinal 10–4 (Boston College)†; Lost Championship 2–4 (Wisconsin)†
Division I
1973–74	WCHA	28	15	11	2	–	–	–	32	3rd	38	22	13	3	.618	Won First round Series 8–4 (Minnesota–Duluth); Lost Second round Series 4–5 (Minnesota)	
1974–75	WCHA	32	9	22	1	–	–	–	19	9th	36	12	23	1	.347		
1975–76	WCHA	32	12	20	0	–	–	–	24	T–7th	39	16	23	0	.410	Lost First round series 10–13 (Michigan Tech)	
1976–77	WCHA	32	16	14	2	–	–	–	34	4th	40	21	17	2	.550	Won First round Series 15–5 (North Dakota); Lost Semifinal Series 8–17 (Michigan)	
Marshall Johnston (1977 — 1981)
1977–78	WCHA	32	27	5	0	–	–	–	54	1st	40	33	6	1	.838	Won First round Series 13–8 (Notre Dame); Lost Second round Series 7–9 (Colorado College)	
1978–79	WCHA	32	14	16	2	–	–	–	30	6th	43	20	20	3	.500	Lost First round series 6–7 (Minnesota–Duluth)	
1979–80	WCHA	26	8	17	1	–	–	–	.327	10th	36	13	22	1	.375		
1980–81	WCHA	28	15	11	2	–	–	–	32	4th	40	23	15	2	.600	Lost First round series 6–10 (Michigan)	
Ralph Backstrom (1981 — 1990)
1981–82	WCHA	26	9	15	2	–	–	–	20	4th	43	21	19	3	.523	Won First round series 10–7 (Minnesota–Duluth); Lost Semifinal series 9–5 (North Dakota)	
1982–83	WCHA	26	11	15	0	–	–	–	22	5th	37	15	22	0	.405	Lost First round series 4–13 (Minnesota–Duluth)	
1983–84	WCHA	26	8	18	0	–	–	–	16	5th	39	14	25	0	.359	Lost First round series 8–13 (Wisconsin)	
1984–85	WCHA	34	16	15	3	–	–	–	35	5th	39	19	17	3	.526	Lost First round series 5–15 (North Dakota)	
1985–86	WCHA	34	25	9	0	–	–	–	50	1st	48	34	13	1	.719	Won First round series 9–6 (Michigan Tech); Won semifinal series 13–7 (Minnesota–Duluth); Won Championship series 6–2 (Minnesota)	Won Quarterfinal series 7–6 (Cornell); Lost Semifinal 2–5 (Harvard); Lost Third-place game 4–6 (Minnesota)
1986–87	WCHA	35	16	16	3	–	–	–	35	T–3rd	40	19	18	3	.513	Lost First round series 4–7 (Colorado College)	
1987–88	WCHA	35	19	14	2	–	–	–	40	3rd	39	20	17	2	.538	Lost First round series 0–2 (Minnesota–Duluth)	
1988–89	WCHA	35	16	17	2	–	–	–	34	5th	43	22	19	2	.535	Won First round series 2–1 (North Dakota); Won Semifinal 2–1 (Minnesota); Lost Championship 4–9 (Northern Michigan)	
1989–90	WCHA	28	13	15	0	–	–	–	26	T–5th	42	18	24	0	.429	Lost First round series 0–2 (Northern Michigan)	
Frank Serratore (1990 — 1994)
1990–91	WCHA	32	5	25	2	–	–	–	12	9th	38	6	30	2	.184		
1991–92	WCHA	32	8	22	2	–	–	–	18	9th	36	9	25	2	.278		
1992–93	WCHA	32	15	15	2	–	–	–	32	6th	38	19	17	2	.526	Lost First round series 0–2 (Northern Michigan)	
1993–94	WCHA	32	11	18	3	–	–	–	25	9th	38	15	20	3	.434	Lost First round series 0–2 (Minnesota)	
George Gwozdecky (1994 — 2013)
1994–95	WCHA	32	18	12	2	–	–	–	38	T–2nd	42	25	15	2	.619	Won First round series 2–0 (Michigan Tech); Lost Semifinal 4–5 (Wisconsin); Lost Third-place game 4–5 (Minnesota)	
1995–96	WCHA	32	17	12	3	–	–	–	37	3rd	39	22	14	3	.603	Lost First round series 1–2 (St. Cloud State)	
1996–97	WCHA	32	17	11	4	–	–	–	38	T–4th	41	24	13	4	.634	Won First round series 2–0 (Minnesota–Duluth); Lost Quarterfinal 2–5 (Colorado College)	Won regional quarterfinal 6–3 (Vermont); Lost regional semifinal 3–4 (Boston University)
1997–98	WCHA	28	8	18	2	–	–	–	18	8th	38	11	25	2	.316	Lost First round series 0–2 (Colorado College)	
1998–99	WCHA	28	15	11	2	–	–	–	32	3rd	41	26	13	2	.659	Won First round series 2–0 (Michigan Tech); Won semifinal 3–2 (Colorado College); Won Championship 4–3 (North Dakota)	Lost regional quarterfinal 3–5 (Michigan)
1999–00	WCHA	28	9	18	1	–	–	–	19	9th	41	16	23	2	.415	Lost First round series 1–2 (North Dakota)	
2000–01	WCHA	28	14	11	3	–	–	–	31	6th	38	19	15	4	.553	Lost First round series 0–2 (Wisconsin)	
2001–02	WCHA	28	21	6	1	–	–	–	43	1st	41	32	8	1	.793	Won First round series 2–0 (Michigan Tech); Won semifinal 3–0 (Colorado College); Won Championship 5–2 (Minnesota)	Lost regional semifinal 3–5 (Michigan)
2002–03	WCHA	28	11	11	6	–	–	–	28	7th	41	21	14	6	.585	Lost First round series 1–2 (North Dakota)	
2003–04	WCHA	28	13	10	5	–	–	–	31	T–4th	44	27	12	5	.670	Lost First round series 0–2 (Colorado College)	Won regional semifinal 3–2 (Miami); Won Regional Final 1–0 (North Dakota); Won Semifinal 5–3 (Minnesota–Duluth); Won Championship 1–0 (Maine)
2004–05	WCHA	28	19	7	2	–	–	–	40	T–1st	43	32	9	2	.767	Won First round series 2–0 (Michigan Tech); Won Semifinal 2–1 (North Dakota); Won Championship 1–0 (Colorado College)	Won regional semifinal 4–3 (Bemidji State); Won Regional Final 4–2 (New Hampshire); Won Semifinal 6–2 (Colorado College); Won Championship 4–1 (North Dakota)
2005–06	WCHA	28	17	8	3	–	–	–	37	T–2nd	39	21	15	3	.577	Lost First round series 1–2 (Minnesota–Duluth)	
2006–07	WCHA	28	13	11	4	–	–	–	30	4th	40	21	15	4	.575	Lost First round series 0–2 (Wisconsin)	
2007–08	WCHA	28	16	11	1	–	–	–	33	3rd	41	26	14	1	.646	Won First round series 2–0 (Minnesota–Duluth); Won Semifinal 3–1 (North Dakota); Won Championship 2–1 (Minnesota)	Lost regional semifinal 2–6 (Wisconsin)
2008–09	WCHA	28	16	8	4	–	–	–	36	2nd	40	23	12	5	.638	Won First round series 2–0 (Alaska–Anchorage); Won Semifinal 3–0 (Wisconsin); Lost Championship 0–4 (Minnesota–Duluth)	Lost regional semifinal 2–4 (Miami)
2009–10	WCHA	28	19	5	4	–	–	–	42	1st	41	27	10	4	.707	Won First round series 2–0 (Michigan Tech); Lost Semifinal 3–4 (North Dakota); Lost Third-place game 3–6 (Wisconsin)	Lost regional semifinal 1–2 (RIT)
2010–11	WCHA	28	17	8	3	–	–	–	37	2nd	42	25	12	5	.655	Won First round series 2–0 (Alaska–Anchorage); Won Semifinal 6–2 (Bemidji State); Lost Championship 2–3 (North Dakota)	Won regional semifinal 3–2 (Western Michigan); Lost Regional Final 1–6 (North Dakota)
2011–12	WCHA	28	16	8	4	–	–	–	36	4th	43	25	14	4	.628	Won First round series 2–1 (Wisconsin); Won Semifinal 4–3 (Minnesota–Duluth); Lost Championship 0–4 (North Dakota)	Lost regional semifinal 1–2 (Ferris State)
2012–13	WCHA	28	14	9	5	–	–	–	33	T–4th	39	20	14	5	.577	Lost First round series 1–2 (Colorado College)	Lost regional semifinal 2–5 (New Hampshire)
Jim Montgomery (2013 — 2018)
2013–14	NCHC	24	10	13	3	–	–	2	35	6th	42	20	16	6	.548	Won First round series 2–1 (Omaha); Won Semifinal 4–3 (Western Michigan); Won Championship 4–3 (Miami)	Lost regional semifinal 2–6 (Boston College)
2014–15	NCHC	24	13	10	1	–	–	1	41	4th	40	24	14	2	.625	Won First round series 2–0 (Minnesota–Duluth); Lost Semifinal 3–6 (Miami); Won Third-place game 5–1 (North Dakota)	Won regional semifinal 5–2 (Boston College); Lost Regional Final 1–4 (Providence)
2015–16	NCHC	24	17	5	2	–	–	0	53	T–2nd	41	25	10	6	.683	Won First round series 2–0 (Omaha); Lost Semifinal 2–4 (St. Cloud State); Won Third-place game 4–1 (North Dakota)	Won regional semifinal 7–2 (Boston University); Won Regional Final 6–3 (Ferris State); Lost Semifinal 2–4 (North Dakota)
2016–17	NCHC	24	18	3	3	–	–	2	59	1st	44	33	7	4	.795	Won First round series 2–0 (Colorado College); Lost Semifinal 0–1 (North Dakota); Won Third-place game 5–1 (Western Michigan)	Won regional semifinal 5–2 (Michigan Tech); Won Regional Final 6–3 (Penn State); Won Semifinal 6–1 (Notre Dame); Won Championship 3–2 (Minnesota–Duluth)
2017–18	NCHC	24	12	6	6	–	–	4	46	2nd	41	23	10	8	.659	Won First round series 2–1 (Colorado College); Won Semifinal 3–1 (Minnesota–Duluth); Won Championship 4–1 (St. Cloud State)	Won regional semifinal 5–1 (Penn State); Lost Regional Final 1–5 (Ohio State)
David Carle (2018 — Present)
2018–19	NCHC	24	11	10	3	–	–	3	39	4th	41	24	12	5	.646	Won First round series, 2–0 (North Dakota); Lost Semifinal, 3–1 (Minnesota–Duluth); Won Third-place game, 6–1 (Colorado College)	Won Regional Semifinal, 2–0 (Ohio State); Won Regional Final, 3–0 (American International); Lost National semifinal, 3–4 (OT) (Massachusetts)
2019–20	NCHC	24	11	8	5	–	–	4	42	3rd	36	21	9	6	.667	Tournament Cancelled	
2020–21	NCHC	22	9	12	1	0	2	1	.470	5th	34	10	13	1	.438	Won Quarterfinal, 5–4 (Omaha); Lost Semifinal, 1–2 (OT) (North Dakota)	
2021–22	NCHC	24	18	6	0	1	0	0	53	T–1st	41	31	9	1	.768	Won Quarterfinal series, 2–0 (Miami); Lost Semifinal, 0–2 (Minnesota Duluth)	Won Regional Semifinal, 3–2 (Massachusetts Lowell); Won Regional Final, 2–1 (Minnesota Duluth); Won Semifinal, 3–2 (OT) (Michigan); Won Championship, 5–1 (Minnesota State)
2022–23	NCHC	24	19	5	0	2	1	0	56	1st	40	30	10	0	.750	Won Quarterfinal series, 2–0 (Miami); Lost Semifinal, 0–1 (Colorado College)	Lost Regional Semifinal, 0–2 (Cornell)
2023–24	NCHC	24	15	7	2	3	0	1	45	2nd	44	32	9	3	.761	Won Quarterfinal series, 2–0 (Minnesota Duluth); Won Semifinal, 5–4 (OT) (St. Cloud State); Won Championship, 4–1 (Omaha)	Won Regional Semifinal, 2–1 (OT) (Massachusetts); Won Regional Final, 2–1 (Cornell); Won National Semifinal, 2–1 (OT) (Boston University); Won National Championship, 2–0 (Boston College)
2024–25	NCHC	24	15	8	1	2	1	0	45	3rd	44	31	12	1	.716	Won Quarterfinal series, 2–1 (Colorado College); Won Semifinal, 4–2 (Arizona State); Lost Championship, 2–3 (2OT) (Western Michigan)	Won Regional Semifinal, 5–1 (Providence); Won Regional Final, 3–1 (Boston College); Lost National Semifinal, 2–3 (2OT) (Western Michigan)
Totals											GP	W	L	T	%	Championships	
Regular Season											2565	1466	930	169	.604	12 MCHA / WIHL / WCHA Championships, 3 NCHC Championships	
Conference Post-season											189	111	72	6	.603	14 WCHA Tournament Championships, 3 NCHC Tournament Championships	
NCAA Post-season											72	46	26	0	.639	31 NCAA Tournament Appearances (1 vacated)	
Regular Season and Post-season Record											2826	1623	1028	175	.605	10 NCAA Division I National Championships	

* Winning percentage is used when conference schedules are unbalanced.
† Denver's participation in the 1973 NCAA tournament was later vacated due to recruiting violations.
bold and italic are program records
