= Denver Pioneers men's ice hockey statistical leaders =

The Denver Pioneers men's ice hockey statistical leaders are individual statistical leaders of the Denver Pioneers men's ice hockey program in various categories, including goals, assists, points, and saves. Within those areas, the lists identify single-game, single-season, and career leaders. The Pioneers represent the University of Denver in the NCAA's National Collegiate Hockey Conference.

Denver began competing in intercollegiate ice hockey in 1949. These lists are updated through the end of the 2020–21 season.

== Goals ==
Career
Rk	Player	Goals	Seasons
1	Rick Berens	94	1987–88 1988–89 1989–90 1990–91
2	Ed Beers	93	1978–79 1979–80 1980–81 1981–82
3	Dwight Mathiasen	90	1983–84 1984–85 1985–86
4	Jerry Walker	87	1959–60 1960–61
5	Jason Elders	79	1991–92 1992–93 1993–94 1994–95
6	Dallas Gaume	78	1982–83 1983–84 1984–85 1985–86
	Peter McNab	78	1970–71 1971–72 1972–73
8	Antti Laaksonen	75	1993–94 1994–95 1995–96 1996–97
9	Ed Hays	74	1969–70 1970–71 1971–72 1972–73
	Bill Abbott	74	1951–52 1952–53 1953–54 1954–55

Season
Rk	Player	Goals	Season
1	Jerry Walker	56	1960–61
2	Ed Beers	50	1981–82
3	George Morrison	40	1968–69
	Dwight Mathiasen	40	1985–86
5	Perry Schnarr	37	1976–77
6	Doug Berry	36	1977–78
7	Perry Schnarr	35	1977–78
8	Eric Murano	33	1989–90
9	Dallas Gaume	32	1985–86
	Peter McNab	32	1972–73
	Tom Peluso	32	1971–72
	Joe Kilbey	32	1953–54

Single Game
Rk	Player	Goals	Season	Opponent
1	Eric Murano	5	1989–90	North Dakota
	Doug Berry	5	1977–78	Air Force
	George Morrison	5	1969–70	Colorado College
	John MacMillan	5	1957–58	RPI

== Assists ==
Career
Rk	Player	Assists	Seasons
1	Dallas Gaume	188	1982–83 1983–84 1984–85 1985–86
2	Bill Masterton	130	1958–59 1959–60 1960–61
3	John McMillan	127	1983–84 1984–85 1985–86 1986–87
4	Greg Woods	125	1975–76 1976–77 1977–78 1978–79
5	Doug Berry	115	1975–76 1976–77 1977–78
6	Ian Ramsay	111	1981–82 1982–83 1983–84 1984–85
7	Dave Shields	108	1986–87 1987–88 1988–89 1989–90
	Dwight Mathiasen	108	1983–84 1984–85 1985–86
9	Jack Devine	106	2021–22 2022–23 2023–24 2024–25
10	Ed Hays	103	1969–70 1970–71 1971–72 1972–73

Season
Rk	Player	Assists	Season
1	Dallas Gaume	67	1985–86
2	Don Fraser	57	1981–82
3	Bill Masterton	56	1960–61
4	Dwight Mathiasen	49	1985–86
5	Dallas Gaume	48	1984–85
6	Dallas Gaume	47	1982–83
7	Bill Masterton	46	1959–60
	Doug Berry	46	1977–78
9	Mark Davidson	44	1977–78
	Jack Devine	44	2024–25

Single Game
Rk	Player	Assists	Season	Opponent
1	Ian Ramsay	6	1983–84	Colorado College
	Bill Masterton	6	1960–61	Warroad Lakers
	Bill Masterton	6	1960–61	Regina Capitals
4	Matt Carle	5	2005–06	Minnesota State
	Kevin Doell	5	2002–03	Alabama-Huntsville
	Marc Rousseau	5	1987–88	Colorado College
	Rich Preston	5	1973–74	Ohio State
	Bob Trembecky	5	1967–68	Bemidji State
	Jack Smith	5	1959–60	Harvard

== Points ==
Career
Rk	Player	Points	Seasons
1	Dallas Gaume	266	1982–83 1983–84 1984–85 1985–86
2	Dwight Mathiasen	198	1983–84 1984–85 1985–86
3	John McMillan	196	1983–84 1984–85 1985–86 1986–87
	Bill Masterton	196	1958–59 1959–60 1960–61
5	Rick Berens	180	1987–88 1988–89 1989–90 1990–91
	Doug Berry	180	1975–76 1976–77 1977–78
7	Dave Shields	179	1986–87 1987–88 1988–89 1989–90
8	Ed Hays	177	1969–70 1970–71 1971–72 1972–73
9	Greg Woods	176	1975–76 1976–77 1977–78 1978–79
10	Peter McNab	170	1970–71 1971–72 1972–73

Season
Rk	Player	Points	Season
1	Dallas Gaume	99	1985–86
2	Dwight Mathiasen	89	1985–86
3	Jerry Walker	85	1960–61
4	Ed Beers	84	1981–82
5	Don Fraser	83	1981–82
6	Doug Berry	82	1977–78
7	Bill Masterton	80	1960–61
8	Dave Shields	74	1989–90
9	Peter McNab	72	1972–73
10	Tom Peluso	69	1971–72

Single Game
Rk	Player	Points	Season	Opponent
1	Jack Smith	8	1959–60	Harvard
2	Don Fraser	7	1981–82	Colo. College
	Rich Preston	7	1973–74	Ohio State
	Peter McNab	7	1971–72	Colo. College
	Bob Trembecky	7	1967–68	Bemidji State
	Bill Masterton	7	1960–61	Warroad Lakers
	Bill Masterton	7	1960–61	Regina Capitals
	Bob Carruthers	7	1952–53	Brandon

== Saves ==
Career
Rk	Player	Saves	Seasons
1	Ron Grahame	3,565	1969–70 1970–71 1971–72 1972–73
2	Tanner Jaillet	3,153	2014–15 2015–16 2016–17 2017–18
3	Stephen Wagner	2,953	1996–97 1997–98 1998–99 1999–00
4	Bryan Schoen	2,916	1989–90 1990–91 1991–92 1992–93
5	Lucien Carignan	2,833	1987–88 1988–89 1989–90 1990–91
6	Pat Tierney	2,796	1980–81 1981–82 1982–83 1983–84
7	Sam Brittain	2,769	2010–11 2011–12 2012–13 2013–14
8	Scott Robinson	2,770	1978–79 1979–80 1980–81 1981–82
9	Magnus Chrona	2,604	2019–20 2020–21 2021–22 2022–23
10	Peter Mannino	2,552	2004–05 2005–06 2006–07 2007–08

Season
Rk	Player	Saves	Season
1	Ron Grahame	1,187	1972–73
2	Pete LoPresti	1,142	1973–74
3	Sam Brittain	1,130	2013–14
4	Ron Grahame	1,110	1971–72
5	Marc Cheverie	1,089	2008–09
6	Pat Tierney	1,052	1981–82
7	Adam Berkhoel	1,020	2003–04
8	Bryan Schoen	1,016	1991–92
9	Matt Davis	997	2024–25
10	Marc Cheverie	976	2009–10

Single Game
Rk	Player	Saves	Season	Opponent
1	Sam Brittain	67	2011–12	Minnesota Duluth
2	Pat Tierney	59	1983–84	North Dakota
3	Jim Bales	54	1977–78	Minnesota
4	George DeLange	53	1949–50	Wyoming
5	Pat Tierney	52	1982–83	Colorado College
	Harvey Maron	52	1949–50	Saskatchewan
7	Sinuhe Wallinheimo	50	1993–94	Minnesota
	Tom Allen	50	1984–85	North Dakota
	Buddy Blom	50	1965–66	Michigan Tech
10	Johnny Hicks	49	2025–26	Michigan
	Matt Davis	49	2024–25	Arizona State
	Jim Bales	49	1976–77	Notre Dame
	Jim Bales	49	1976–77	Notre Dame
	Bill Begg	49	1953–54	Michigan State
