= 1973 WCHA men's ice hockey tournament =

1973 WCHA Men's ice hockey tournament
- Dates: March 5–11, 1973
- Teams: 8
- Finals site: Edmund P. Joyce Center; Notre Dame, Indiana; DU Arena; Denver, Colorado
- Champions: Wisconsin† (3rd title); Denver‡ (10th title)
- Winning coach: Bob Johnson (3rd title); Murray Armstrong (10th title)
- WCHA Men's Ice Hockey Tournaments

The 1973 WCHA Men's Ice Hockey Tournament was the 14th conference playoff in league history. The tournament was played between March 5 and March 11, 1973. All games were played at home team campus sites, including each of the two regional final series. By winning the regional tournaments, both Wisconsin and Denver were invited to participate in the 1973 NCAA Division I Men's Ice Hockey Tournament.

Though not official designations, Wisconsin is considered as the East Regional Champion† and Denver as the West Regional Champion‡.

== Format ==
The top eight teams in the WCHA, according to their final conference standings, were eligible for the tournament and were seeded No. 1 through No. 8. In the first round the first and eighth seeds, the second and seventh seeds, the third and sixth seeds and the fourth and fifth seeds were matched in two-game series where the school that scored the higher number of goals was declared the winner. After the first round the remaining teams were reseeded No. 1 through No. 4 according to their final conference standings and advanced to the second round. In the second round the first and fourth seeds and the second and third seeds competed in an additional two-game, total goal series with the winners of each being declared as co-conference champions.

=== Conference standings ===
Note: GP = Games played; W = Wins; L = Losses; T = Ties; PTS = Points; GF = Goals For; GA = Goals Against

1972–73 Western Collegiate Hockey Association standings
	Conference							Overall					
	GP	W	L	T	PTS	GF	GA	GP	W	L	T	GF	GA
Denver†*	28	20	8	0	52	141	85	39	29	9	1	208	116
Notre Dame	28	19	9	0	48	150	119	38	23	14	1	199	174
Wisconsin*	28	18	9	1	47	134	101	40	29	9	2	217	139
Michigan State	26	16	9	1	47	132	114	36	23	12	1	194	149
Michigan Tech	26	16	10	0	44	135	106	38	24	13	1	198	139
Minnesota	28	12	13	3	35	94	102	34	15	16	3	124	129
North Dakota	30	13	15	2	32	124	131	36	17	17	2	154	157
Minnesota-Duluth	28	13	15	0	30	123	131	36	19	17	0	166	161
Colorado College	28	5	23	0	14	103	171	34	10	24	0	150	198
Michigan	30	4	25	1	11	116	183	34	6	27	1	136	206
Championship: Wisconsin, Denver † indicates conference regular season champion * indicates conference tournament champion

== Bracket ==
Teams are reseeded after the first round

First Round; March 5–7
1	Denver	5	4
8	Minnesota-Duluth	4	2
2	Notre Dame	5	8
7	North Dakota	0	3
3	Wisconsin	8	6
6	Minnesota	6	4
4	Michigan State	2	3
5	Michigan Tech	7	1

Second Round; March 9–11
1	Denver	3	4
5	Michigan Tech	3	0
2	Notre Dame	4	3
3	Wisconsin	4	4

Note: * denotes overtime period(s)

=== First round ===
==== (1) Denver vs. (8) Minnesota-Duluth ====
March 6	Denver	5 – 4	Minnesota-Duluth	Denver Coliseum

March 7	Denver	4 – 2	Minnesota-Duluth	Denver Coliseum

Denver won series 9–6

==== (2) Notre Dame vs. (7) North Dakota ====
March 5	Notre Dame	5 – 0	North Dakota	Edmund P. Joyce Center

March 6	Notre Dame	8 – 3	North Dakota	Edmund P. Joyce Center

Notre Dame won series 13–3

==== (3) Wisconsin vs. (6) Minnesota ====
March 5	Wisconsin	8 – 6	Minnesota	Dane County Coliseum

March 6	Wisconsin	6 – 4	Minnesota	Dane County Coliseum

Wisconsin won series 14–10

==== (4) Michigan State vs. (5) Michigan Tech ====
March 5	Michigan State	2 – 7	Michigan Tech	Demonstration Hall

March 6	Michigan State	3 – 1	Michigan Tech	Demonstration Hall

Michigan Tech won series 8–5

=== Second round ===
==== (1) Denver vs. (5) Michigan Tech ====
March 10	Denver	3 – 3	Michigan Tech	Denver Coliseum

March 11	Denver	4 – 0	Michigan Tech	Denver Coliseum

Denver won series 7–3

==== (2) Notre Dame vs. (3) Wisconsin ====
March 9	Notre Dame	4 – 4	Wisconsin	Edmund P. Joyce Center

March 10	Notre Dame	3 – 4	Wisconsin	Edmund P. Joyce Center

Wisconsin won series 8–7

== Tournament awards ==
None

== See also ==
- Western Collegiate Hockey Association men's champions
