= 1960–61 Denver Pioneers men's ice hockey season =

Collegiate team season

National champion WCHA, champion WCHA Tournament, co-champion NCAA Tournament, champion
- Conference: 1st WCHA
- Home ice: DU Arena

Record
- Overall: 30–1–1
- Conference: 17–1–0
- Home: 21–0–1
- Road: 7–1–0
- Neutral: 2–0–0

Coaches and captains
- Head coach: Murray Armstrong
- Captain: Bill Masterton

The 1960–61 Denver Pioneers men's ice hockey team represented University of Denver in college ice hockey. In its 5th year under head coach Murray Armstrong the team compiled a 30–1–1 record and reached the NCAA tournament for the third time in four years. The Pioneers defeated St. Lawrence 12–2 in the championship game at the DU Arena in Denver, Colorado. Denver set a record for the most wins by a team in one season, breaking the previous high of 27 they had earned the previous year.

== Season ==
Denver's program was riding high after winning the NCAA tournament the year before as well as having the first player in program history earn an NHL contract following the championship. Head coach Murray Armstrong was not willing to rest on his laurels, however. After the team's first national title in 1958 the program was shut out of the tournament the following year and, not wanting to see a repeat performance, Armstrong watched his team get off to a fast start with three wins at home before embarking on a brief but arduous road trip.

Their first stop was in North Dakota where they easily took two games from a weak Fighting Sioux squad before heading to Houghton to face a tough Michigan Tech team that given them fits the year before. The Huskies took the first game, holding Denver to a season-low 2 goals, but the Pioneers evened the score the next night with a 5–2 win.

Two days later Denver was back home where they would remain for essentially the next two months. Denver playing too many of their games at home was the main cause of their missing the 1959 tournament despite having the best record in the country. Even with that recent history the Pioneers had skewed an already home-favored schedule for 1961 with 20 games at home and only 8 on the road. They were able to do this in part because they now belonged to the WCHA rather than being an Independent program and as a result they would only have to be one of the two best squads in the 7-team conference to have home-ice in the playoffs.

With all of these advantages built into their schedule Denver took full advantage and ran roughshod over their opponents. After sweeping four games in 5 days against Michigan State and Michigan (though they got a scare with an overtime win in the final match), Denver welcomed the Huskies for a rematch at the end of December and took both games to place themselves firmly atop the conference standings. After a series against a Canadian senior team that provided Denver with its only tie of the season, the Pioneers dominated North Dakota in two games before welcoming the US National Team. Though Team USA had just won the gold medal most of the players from that squad were no longer on the team and the perceptibly weaker group was easily defeated in both games.

After their first of two home-and-home meetings with in-state rival Colorado College, Denver hosted the Warroad Lakers for a three-game series and totally dominated the visitors by scoring 9 goals in each game. In mid-February Denver finally left Colorado for two games against a strong Michigan squad and took both contests before ending their regular season with a second series against the CC Tigers.

The one team from the WCHA that they did not face during the season was Minnesota. This was due to the on-going feud between the two programs over recruiting practices. Both teams were able to benefit from this since the two teams were the strongest in the WCHA and finished in the top two of the conference. Denver won their second consecutive WCHA title with their 17–1 conference record and played Michigan Tech at home in the WCHA tournament. For the first game of the total-goal series Denver dominated the Huskies, winning 9–1 and followed that up with an equally impressive 8–2 victory the following night. Denver's 17–3 victory was the widest margin for any 2-game series in the history of the WCHA tournament as well as being tied for the most goals scored by one team in a two-game series.

Denver received the top western seed while WCHA co-champion Minnesota was afforded the #2 seed. Partially due to Denver and Minnesota having not played against one another all season the NCAA took the unprecedented step of placing both WCHA teams in the same semifinal game. This was the first time two teams from the same conference or region would play in an opening round of the NCAA tournament, an occurrence that would not happen again until 2008. Despite their being the top two teams from the WCHA from the drop of the puck it was obvious that Denver was far superior to the Golden Gophers. Minnesota did well to hold the Pioneers to six goals in their 6–1 victory that sent Denver back to the title game. In the championship match Denver faced Tri-State League champion St. Lawrence and were heavily favored to repeat as national champions. Despite that it was the Saints who scored first, less than 90 seconds into the contest. Denver was able to tie the score less than two minutes later and then built a two-goal lead before the Larries cut the lead to one with just under seven to play in the first period. After the second goal against Denver clamped down on the Saints' attack and controlled the rest of the game. In the final 45 minutes of play Denver scored the final 9 goals of the game (an NCAA tournament record) to win by an astounding 10-goal margin (also a record). Team captain Bill Masterton scored a hat trick with two assists and was named the tournament MOP. Denver's thoroughly dominating performance in the two games got five members of the team onto the All-Tournament first team (tied for the most in NCAA history): Marty Howe, Grant Munro, Trent Beatty, Bill Masterton and Jerry Walker with only Minnesota's Mike Larson stopping their bid for a sweep. Additionally George Kirkwood and George Konik made the second team.

The 1961 Denver team set several new NCAA records, including most wins by a program with 30. Their 30–1–1 record was the second best winning percentage (.953) for an NCAA champion at the time and currently sits at 4th-best in history (behind only 1949 Boston College, 1970 Cornell and 1993 Maine as of 2018) Denver also scored at one of the highest goals per game pace in NCAA history with a whopping 7.56. Additionally they were the best defensive team to that point, allowing only 59 goals against in 32 contests for a team goals against average of 1.84. Denver's average margin of victory of 5.72 goals was the second-largest average in NCAA history at the time and still stands as the largest ever for a championship team. Jerry Walker's 85 points that season were a record for any WCHA player and were not beaten until the conference expanded to many more games in the mid-1970s while his WCHA-record 56 goals still stands as of 2018. George Kirkwood set an NCAA record for wins in a season with 30 and finished with a then-record career winning percentage of .894 which was broken by future Hall-of-Famer Ken Dryden.

Denver's unparalleled performance throughout the season caused the WCHA voters to name 5 players to the All-WCHA First Team: George Kirkwood, George Konik, Marty Howe, Bill Masterton and Jerry Walker while a record 5 Pioneers appeared on AHCA All-American West Team with Grant Munro being selected rather than Konik.

The 1960-61 Denver team is commonly regarded as the best in the history of the program and one of the greatest teams in NCAA history.

== Standings ==
1960–61 Western Collegiate Hockey Association standings
	Conference							Overall					
	GP	W	L	T	PCT	GF	GA	GP	W	L	T	GF	GA
Denver†*	18	17	1	0	.944	127	31	32	30	1	1	242	59
Minnesota*	20	14	6	0	.700	100	68	29	17	11	1	126	111
Michigan	24	15	8	1	.646	97	79	28	16	10	2	108	89
Michigan Tech	24	13	11	0	.542	92	58	29	16	13	0	132	78
North Dakota	24	7	16	0	.313	81	133	29	9	19	1	100	151
Michigan State	20	5	15	0	.250	55	90	27	11	16	0	121	115
Colorado College	22	4	18	0	.182	68	161	24	4	20	0	76	175
Championship: Minnesota, Denver † indicates conference regular season champion * indicates conference tournament champion

== Schedule ==
Date	Opponent	Site	Result	Record
Exhibition
November 26	vs. DU Hilltoppers*	DU Arena • Denver, Colorado	W 10–3	
Regular Season
December 2	at Regina Capitals*	DU Arena • Denver, Colorado	W 10–2	1–0
December 3	at Regina Capitals*	DU Arena • Denver, Colorado	W 2–0	2–0
December 9	vs. Colorado College*	DU Arena • Denver, Colorado	W 8–4	3–0
December 12	at North Dakota	Winter Sports Building • Grand Forks, North Dakota	W 7–2	4–0 (1–0)
December 13	at North Dakota	Winter Sports Building • Grand Forks, North Dakota	W 5–1	5–0 (2–0)
December 16	at Michigan Tech	Dee Stadium • Houghton, Michigan	L 2–3	5–1 (2–1)
December 17	at Michigan Tech	Dee Stadium • Houghton, Michigan	W 5–2	6–1 (3–1)
December 19	vs. Michigan State	DU Arena • Denver, Colorado	W 10–2	7–1 (4–1)
December 20	vs. Michigan State	DU Arena • Denver, Colorado	W 9–0	8–1 (5–1)
December 22	vs. Michigan	DU Arena • Denver, Colorado	W 8–1	9–1 (6–1)
December 23	vs. Michigan	DU Arena • Denver, Colorado	W 4–3 ^{OT}	10–1 (7–1)
December 26	vs. Michigan Tech	DU Arena • Denver, Colorado	W 5–1	11–1 (8–1)
December 27	vs. Michigan Tech	DU Arena • Denver, Colorado	W 2–0	12–1 (9–1)
January 4	vs. Moose Jaw Pla-Mors*	DU Arena • Denver, Colorado	W 5–2	13–1 (9–1)
January 6	vs. Moose Jaw Pla-Mors*	DU Arena • Denver, Colorado	T 3–3 ^{OT}	13–1–1 (9–1)
January 13	vs. North Dakota	DU Arena • Denver, Colorado	W 15–1	14–1–1 (10–1)
January 14	vs. North Dakota	DU Arena • Denver, Colorado	W 6–2	15–1–1 (11–1)
January 27	vs. US National Team*	DU Arena • Denver, Colorado	W 10–0	16–1–1 (11–1)
January 28	vs. US National Team*	DU Arena • Denver, Colorado	W 6–2	17–1–1 (11–1)
February 3	vs. Colorado College	DU Arena • Denver, Colorado	W 11–1	18–1–1 (12–1)
February 4	at Colorado College	Broadmoor World Arena • Colorado Springs, Colorado	W 7–5	19–1–1 (13–1)
February 8	vs. Warroad Lakers*	DU Arena • Denver, Colorado	W 9–1	20–1–1 (13–1)
February 10	vs. Warroad Lakers*	DU Arena • Denver, Colorado	W 9–2	21–1–1 (13–1)
February 11	vs. Warroad Lakers*	DU Arena • Denver, Colorado	W 9–2	22–1–1 (13–1)
February 17	at Michigan	Weinberg Coliseum • Ann Arbor, Michigan	W 8–1	23–1–1 (14–1)
February 18	at Michigan	Weinberg Coliseum • Ann Arbor, Michigan	W 4–2	24–1–1 (15–1)
March 3	vs. Colorado College	DU Arena • Denver, Colorado	W 8–1	25–1–1 (16–1)
March 4	at Colorado College	Broadmoor World Arena • Colorado Springs, Colorado	W 13–3	26–1–1 (17–1)
WCHA Tournament
March 10	vs. Michigan Tech*	DU Arena • Denver, Colorado (WCHA Final Game 1)	W 9–1	27–1–1 (17–1)
March 11	vs. Michigan Tech*	DU Arena • Denver, Colorado (WCHA Final Game 2)	W 8–2	28–1–1 (17–1)
NCAA Tournament
March 17	vs. Minnesota*	DU Arena • Denver, Colorado (National Semifinal)	W 6–1	29–1–1 (17–1)
March 18	vs. St. Lawrence*	DU Arena • Denver, Colorado (National championship)	W 12–2	30–1–1 (17–1)
*Non-conference game. Source:

== Roster and scoring statistics ==
No.	Name	Year	Position	Hometown	S/P/C	Games	Goals	Assists	Points	PIM
1	George Kirkwood	Junior	G	Edmonton, AB	(Alberta)	32	–	–	–	–
2	George Konik	Senior	D	Flin Flon, MB	(Manitoba)	27	12	19	31	40
3	Jack Wilson	Sophomore	D	Big River, SK	(Saskatchewan)	–	–	–	–	–
4	Norb Kemp	Senior	G	Regina, SK	(Saskatchewan)	–	–	–	–	–
5	Marty Howe	Senior	D	Regina, SK	(Saskatchewan)	–	–	–	–	–
6	Grant Munro	Senior	D	Regina, SK	(Saskatchewan)	32	11	16	27	38
7	Terry Lomnes	Senior	LW	Camrose, AB	(Alberta)	–	–	–	–	–
8	Ken Williamson	Junior	C	Winnipeg, MB	(Manitoba)	–	–	–	–	–
9	Bill Masterton	Senior	C	Winnipeg, MB	(Manitoba)	32	24	56	80	4
10	Marshall Johnston	Sophomore	D	Birch Hills, SK	(Saskatchewan)	–	–	–	–	–
11	Jerry Walker	Senior	F	Regina, SK	(Saskatchewan)	32	56	29	85	–
12	Paul Josephson	Senior	C	Saskatoon, SK	(Saskatchewan)	–	–	–	33	–
13	John Art	Sophomore	D/RW	Regina, SK	(Saskatchewan)	–	–	–	–	–
14	Gerald Duffus	Sophomore	LW	Saskatoon, SK	(Saskatchewan)	–	–	–	–	–
15	Max Geisthardt	Senior	LW	Regina, SK	(Saskatchewan)	–	–	–	–	–
16	Trent Beatty	Junior	RW	Kerrobert, SK	(Saskatchewan)	–	–	–	–	–
17	Gregory Lacomy	Sophomore	F	Winnipeg, MB	(Manitoba)	–	–	–	–	–
18	Dick Jacob	Junior	F	Crescent City, CA	(California)	9	0	1	1	2
19	Paul DiNapoli	Junior	G	Belmont, MA	(Massachusetts)	–	–	–	–	–
Total										

== Goaltending statistics ==
No.	Name	Games	Minutes	Wins	Losses	Ties	Goals against	Saves	Shut outs	SV %	GAA
1	George Kirkwood	32	–	30	1	1	–	–	4	.910	1.84
4	Norb Kemp	–	–	–	–	–	–	–	–	–	–
20	Paul DiNapoli	–	–	–	–	–	–	–	–	–	–
Total		32	–	30	1	1	–	–	4	–	–

== 1961 championship game ==
=== W1 Denver vs. E1 St. Lawrence ===
March 18	Denver	12 – 2	St. Lawrence	University of Denver Arena

Scoring summary
Period	Team	Goal	Assist(s)	Time	Score
1st	SLU	John Mason	R. Mason and Corby	1:22	1–0 SLU
1st	DEN	Bill Masterton	Beatty and Walker	3:19	1–1
1st	DEN	Trent Beatty	Masterton and Munro	7:21	2–1 DEN
1st	DEN	Jerry Walker – GW	Beatty	12:09	3–1 DEN
1st	SLU	Buster Dower	Slater	13:14	3–2 DEN
1st	DEN	Jerry Duffus	Williamson and Art	14:51	4–2 DEN
1st	DEN	Bill Masterton	Walker and Munro	15:49	5–2 DEN
2nd	DEN	Trent Beatty	Masterton and Walker	25:33	6–2 DEN
2nd	DEN	Grant Munro	Lomnes	26:57	7–2 DEN
2nd	DEN	George Konik – PP	Josephson and Wilson	31:31	8–2 DEN
2nd	DEN	Ken Williamson – PP	Art and Wilson	37:47	9–2 DEN
3rd	DEN	Bill Masterton – PP	Konik	50:46	10–2 DEN
3rd	DEN	Grant Munro – PP	Josephson	52:15	11–2 DEN
3rd	DEN	Terry Lomnes	unassisted	56:57	12–2 DEN

Shots by period
Team	1	2	3	T
St. Lawrence	6	8	5	19
Denver	20	17	13	50

Goaltenders
Team	Name	Saves	Goals against	Time on ice
SLU	Richie Broadbelt	38	12	
DEN	George Kirkwood	17	2	
