= 1961 WCHA men's ice hockey tournament =

1961 WCHA Men's ice hockey tournament
- Dates: March 10–11, 1961
- Teams: 4
- Finals site: Williams Arena; Minneapolis, Minnesota; DU Arena; Denver, Colorado
- Champions: Minnesota† (1st title); Denver‡ (2nd title)
- Winning coach: John Mariucci (1st title); Murray Armstrong (2nd title)
- WCHA Men's Ice Hockey Tournaments

The 1961 WCHA Men's Ice Hockey Tournament was the 2nd conference playoff in league history. The tournament was played between March 10 and March 11, 1961. All games were played at home team campus sites. By being declared as co-champions, both Minnesota and Denver were invited to participate in the 1961 NCAA Men's Ice Hockey Tournament.

Though not official designations, Minnesota is considered as the East Regional Champion† and Denver as the West Regional Champion‡.

== Format ==
The top four teams in the WCHA, based upon the conference regular season standings, were eligible for the tournament and were seeded No. 1 through No. 4. In the first round the first and fourth seeds and the second and third seeds were matched in two-game series where the team with the higher number of goals scored was declared the winner. Rather than decide upon a single tournament champion, the WCHA declared the winners of the two series as co-tournament champions.

=== Conference standings ===
Note: GP = Games played; W = Wins; L = Losses; T = Ties; PCT = Winning percentage; GF = Goals for; GA = Goals against

1960–61 Western Collegiate Hockey Association standings
| | Conference | | | | | | | Overall | | | | | |
| | GP | W | L | T | PCT | GF | GA | GP | W | L | T | GF | GA |
|---|---|---|---|---|---|---|---|---|---|---|---|---|---|
| Denver†* | 18 | 17 | 1 | 0 | .944 | 127 | 31 | 32 | 30 | 1 | 1 | 242 | 59 |
| Minnesota* | 20 | 14 | 6 | 0 | .700 | 100 | 68 | 29 | 17 | 11 | 1 | 126 | 111 |
| Michigan | 24 | 15 | 8 | 1 | .646 | 97 | 79 | 28 | 16 | 10 | 2 | 108 | 89 |
| Michigan Tech | 24 | 13 | 11 | 0 | .542 | 92 | 58 | 29 | 16 | 13 | 0 | 132 | 78 |
| North Dakota | 24 | 7 | 16 | 0 | .313 | 81 | 133 | 29 | 9 | 19 | 1 | 100 | 151 |
| Michigan State | 20 | 5 | 15 | 0 | .250 | 55 | 90 | 27 | 11 | 16 | 0 | 121 | 115 |
| Colorado College | 22 | 4 | 18 | 0 | .182 | 68 | 161 | 24 | 4 | 20 | 0 | 76 | 175 |
Championship: Minnesota, Denver † indicates conference regular season champion * indicates conference tournament champion

== Bracket ==
Finals; March 10–11
1 | Denver | 9 | 8
4 | Michigan Tech | 1 | 2
2 | Minnesota | 3 | 3
3 | Michigan | 1 | 3

Note: * denotes overtime period(s)

=== Finals ===
==== (1) Denver vs. (4) Michigan Tech ====
| March 10 | Denver | 9 – 1 | Michigan Tech | DU Arena |

| March 11 | Denver | 8 – 2 | Michigan Tech | DU Arena |

| Denver won series 17–3 |

==== (2) Minnesota vs. (3) Michigan ====
| March 10 | Minnesota | 3 – 1 | Michigan | Williams Arena |

| March 11 | Minnesota | 3 – 3 | Michigan | Williams Arena |

| Minnesota won series 6–4 |

== Tournament awards ==
- None

== See also ==
- Western Collegiate Hockey Association men's champions
- 1961 NCAA Division I Men's Ice Hockey Tournament
