= 1972–73 Wisconsin Badgers men's ice hockey season =

American college ice hockey season

National champion Big Ten, champion WCHA Tournament, co-champion NCAA Tournament, champion
- Conference: 1st (tied) Big Ten; 3rd (tied) WCHA
- Home ice: Dane County Coliseum

Record
- Overall: 29–9–2
- Conference: 18–9–1 / 8–3–1
- Home: 17–1
- Road: 5–8–1
- Neutral: 7–0–1

Coaches and captains
- Head coach: Bob Johnson
- Assistant coaches: Bill Rothwell
- Captain: Tim Dool

The 1972–73 Wisconsin Badgers men's ice hockey team represented the University of Wisconsin–Madison in college ice hockey. In its seventh year under head coach Bob Johnson, the team compiled a 29–9–2 record (18–9–1 against Western Collegiate Hockey Association (WCHA) opponents) and outscored all opponents 217 to 139. The Badgers received one of the WCHA's automatic bids to the 1973 NCAA University Division Men's Ice Hockey Tournament by winning the 1973 WCHA Men's Ice Hockey Tournament. They defeated the Cornell Big Red in the Frozen Four semifinals and then beat WCHA-rival Denver Pioneers 4–2 to win their first national championship in Boston, Massachusetts.

Forward Dean Talafous was chosen as the Most Outstanding Player in the NCAA Tournament. He had the winning goal in both of Wisconsin's victories as well as a tying score in the waning moments of the Badgers' semifinal match.

== Season ==
Coming off of a then-season-best 27 wins, and second NCAA tournament appearance in three years, Wisconsin was looking to take the final step towards winning a national championship. After losing to a dismal Colorado College team in their first game, Bob Johnson's Badgers went on an eleven-game tear and announced themselves as early-season contenders. In hindsight their 11-1 record was a bit misleading due to having faced CC and Michigan (the two worst WCHA teams) four times each as well as a series against 15th-place Colgate, going 9-1 in those games. Once Wisconsin began to face difficult opponents their record came back to earth. While their overall mark dipped as the season wore on, Wisconsin's home record remained in the stratosphere, not dropping a single match at the Dane County Coliseum until March and finishing with an astounding 17-1 record at home.

Key to the Badgers' success was a very evenly distributed offense. While none of Wisconsin's players finished anywhere near the top of the NCAA leaderboard, the team produced five 20-goal scorers and a further five 10-goal scorers, a feat some NHL teams struggle to achieve in twice as many games. The balanced Badger attack kept Wisconsin alive as they slowly dipped in the standings especially with their trouble on the road. After Minnesota ended Wisconsin's winning streak the Badgers won the St. Louis Invitational Tournament over the Christmas break but split the next two true away series. Starting with a loss to Michigan State on January 13 the Badgers dropped the final five road games and were in jeopardy of slipping to 4th in the conference when the Golden Gophers beat them at home in the penultimate game of the regular season. A win in the last match, however, kept them tied with Michigan State in the standings and with the tie-breakers in Wisconsin's favor the Badgers were able to avoid a potential matchup with league-leading Denver in the WCHA tournament.

Wisconsin began the conference tournament facing Minnesota and got a measure of revenge for earlier struggles with a pair of two-goal victories. The second round saw the Badgers pitted against Notre Dame and, because of a weekend sweep by the Fighting Irish at the end of February, Wisconsin was forced to face their foe in the opponent's building. Despite the game technically being a neutral-site meeting the hostile crowd let everyone know was favored. The two teams battled to a 4-4 tie in the first game, leaving the second match as a winner-take-all affair. Miraculously Wisconsin proved the victor with a 4-3 score and won their way into the NCAA tournament for the third time.

For their first match Wisconsin was set against the powerhouse ECAC Hockey champion Cornell Big Red. The boys from Ithaca possessed one of the strongest defenses in the nation, surrendering only 83 goals in 27 games en route to posting a 23-3-1 record. The favored Big Red didn't disappoint, scoring the opening goal 40 seconds into the game. After a second marker in the first frame and another 30 seconds into the middle period the Badgers were behind the eight-ball. Cornell score yet again four minutes later and before the game was even half over the Badger's already appeared to have been defeated. The decentralized Badger attack finally made itself known in the second half of period two with a pair of markers to cut Cornell's lead in half. With the Wisconsin faithful chanting 'SIEVE' at Dave Elenbaas Cornell didn't seem to mind and scored their third goal in the first minute of a period to take a 5-2 lead. Somehow, despite being outplayed, Wisconsin pulled to within one with goals at 12- and 3-minutes to play. With time winding down the Badgers furiously fired the puck and with five seconds left on the clock Dean Talafous notched the tying goal and sent the building into a frenzy. The overtime session saw several opportunities by both squads but as fatigue began to set in mistakes were made and just before the first extra frame ended a trio of Badgers rushed towards the goal. Elenbaas tried to meet them head-on but the puck found its way onto the stick of Talafous who shot it into the net and allowed Wisconsin to capture an improbable 6-5 overtime win.

In Wisconsin's first championship game they faced the other top team in the NCAA, Denver. The Pioneers possessed an even stingier defense, led by WCHA Most Valuable Player and All-American Ron Grahame. While Denver had a good offense and four First Team All-WCHA players, the Badgers' unheralded bunch had combined to score more than Denver had and managed to earn two Second Team positions. The Badgers got out to an early lead just over three minutes into the game but the Pioneers responded with one of their own less than a minute later. While the play favored Wisconsin the score didn't and Denver was able to take a lead with a power play marker 54 seconds into the second period. just over three minutes later Bob Young took Denver's only penalty of the game and it proved a costly one as Wisconsin was able to tie the score on the ensuing man-advantage. Just over four minutes after that Dean Talafous scored his third goal of the tournament to put the Badgers into the lead for the second time. The score remained that way until the third minute of the final period when Jim Johnston gave Wisconsin a two-goal lead. Denver was unable to match the Badger's fervor and Jim Makey's stellar goaltending allowed Wisconsin to skate off with their first National Title.

Wisconsin's win brought the crown back to the WCHA for the first time in four seasons and started a five-year run of western dominance where no eastern team could even make the title match. Dean Talafous scored both game-winning goals for the Badgers as well as notching the tying marker in the semifinal so it came with no surprise that he was named as the tournament's Most Outstanding Player. Along with Talafous, Jim Makey, John Taft and Stan Hinkley were named to the All-Tournament Team After the tournament had ended the NCAA wanted to enforce a new policy that would make students who had played for Canadian junior team ineligible as they received a nominal stipend for room and board which the NCAA considered a payment making those players professionals. To ease the transition the NCAA told the universities that they wanted their programs to declare their own players ineligible and afterwards the NCAA would restore status to the players, effectively 'grandfathering' in the prohibition on major junior players. While most teams, including Wisconsin, acquiesced to the NCAA, Denver refused to follow suit and had their players not only ruled ineligible but their participation in the 1973 tournament vacated.

== Standings ==
1972–73 Western Collegiate Hockey Association standings
	Conference							Overall					
	GP	W	L	T	PTS	GF	GA	GP	W	L	T	GF	GA
Denver†*	28	20	8	0	52	141	85	39	29	9	1	208	116
Notre Dame	28	19	9	0	48	150	119	38	23	14	1	199	174
Wisconsin*	28	18	9	1	47	134	101	40	29	9	2	217	139
Michigan State	26	16	9	1	47	132	114	36	23	12	1	194	149
Michigan Tech	26	16	10	0	44	135	106	38	24	13	1	198	139
Minnesota	28	12	13	3	35	94	102	34	15	16	3	124	129
North Dakota	30	13	15	2	32	124	131	36	17	17	2	154	157
Minnesota-Duluth	28	13	15	0	30	123	131	36	19	17	0	166	161
Colorado College	28	5	23	0	14	103	171	34	10	24	0	150	198
Michigan	30	4	25	1	11	116	183	34	6	27	1	136	206
Championship: Wisconsin, Denver † indicates conference regular season champion * indicates conference tournament champion

1972–73 Big Ten standings
	Conference							Overall					
	GP	W	L	T	PTS	GF	GA	GP	W	L	T	GF	GA
Wisconsin†	12	8	3	1	17	60	40	40	29	9	2	217	139
Michigan State†	12	8	3	1	17	60	44	36	23	12	1	194	149
Minnesota	12	5	4	3	13	50	47	34	15	16	3	124	129
Michigan	12	1	11	0	2	40	75	34	6	27	1	136	206
† indicates conference regular season champion

=== Schedule ===
During the season, Wisconsin compiled a 29–10–2 record, the best year the program had produced to that point. Its schedule was as follows.

Date	Opponent	Score	Result	Venue	Location	Record (WCHA / Big Ten)
Nov. 3, 1972	Colorado College †	6–10	Loss	Broadmoor World Arena	Colorado Springs, CO	0–1 (0–1 / 0–0)
Nov. 4, 1972	Colorado College †	5–0	Win	Broadmoor World Arena	Colorado Springs, CO	1–1 (1–1 / 0–0)
Nov. 10, 1972	Colgate	13–3	Win	Dane County Coliseum	Madison, WI	2–1 (1–1 / 0–0)
Nov. 11, 1972	Colgate	13–1	Win	Dane County Coliseum	Madison, WI	3–1 (1–1 / 0–0)
Nov. 17, 1972	Colorado College †	6–3	Win	Dane County Coliseum	Madison, WI	4–1 (2–1 / 0–0)
Nov. 18, 1972	Colorado College †	5–3	Win	Dane County Coliseum	Madison, WI	5–1 (3–1 / 0–0)
Nov. 24, 1972	Michigan ‡	5–3	Win	Yost Ice Arena	Ann Arbor, MI	6–1 (4–1 / 1–0)
Nov. 25, 1972	Michigan ‡	7–2	Win	Yost Ice Arena	Ann Arbor, MI	7–1 (5–1 / 2–0)
Dec. 1, 1972	Notre Dame †	5–4*	Win	Dane County Coliseum	Madison, WI	8–1 (6–1 / 2–0)
Dec. 2, 1972	Notre Dame †	5–3	Win	Dane County Coliseum	Madison, WI	9–1 (7–1 / 2–0)
Dec. 8, 1972	Michigan ‡	6–3	Win	Dane County Coliseum	Madison, WI	10–1 (8–1 / 3–0)
Dec. 9, 1972	Michigan ‡	10–4	Win	Dane County Coliseum	Madison, WI	11–1 (9–1 / 4–0)
Dec. 22, 1972	Minnesota	4–4*	Tie	Williams Arena	Minneapolis, MN	11–1–1 (9–1–1 / 4–0–1)
Dec. 23, 1972	Minnesota	2–4	Loss	Williams Arena	Minneapolis, MN	11–2–1 (9–2–1 / 4–1–1)
Dec. 28, 1972	Colorado College %	6–2	Win	St. Louis Arena	St. Louis, MO	12–2–1 (9–2–1 / 4–1–1)
Dec. 31, 1972	Minnesota %	5–1	Win	St. Louis Arena	St. Louis, MO	13–2–1 (9–2–1 / 4–1–1)
Jan. 5, 1973	Denver †	3–2	Win	Denver Coliseum	Denver, CO	14–2–1 (10–2–1 / 4–1–1)
Jan. 6, 1973	Denver †	1–2	Loss	Denver Coliseum	Denver, CO	14–3–1 (10–3–1 / 4–1–1)
Jan. 12, 1973	Michigan State ‡	4–3	Win	Munn Ice Arena	East Lansing, MI	15–3–1 (11–3–1 / 5–1–1)
Jan. 13, 1973	Michigan State ‡	5–7	Loss	Munn Ice Arena	East Lansing, MI	15–4–1 (11–4–1 / 5–2–1)
Jan. 19, 1973	Clarkson	5–4*	Win	Dane County Coliseum	Madison, WI	16–4–1 (11–4–1 / 5–2–1)
Jan. 20, 1973	Clarkson	8–3	Win	Dane County Coliseum	Madison, WI	17–4–1 (11–4–1 / 5–2–1)
Jan. 26, 1973	North Dakota †	8–3	Win	Dane County Coliseum	Madison, WI	18–4–1 (12–4–1 / 5–2–1)
Jan. 27, 1973	North Dakota †	4–3	Win	Dane County Coliseum	Madison, WI	19–4–1 (13–4–1 / 5–2–1)
Feb. 2, 1973	Michigan Tech †	1–7	Loss	Student Ice Arena	Houghton, MI	19–5–1 (13–5–1 / 5–2–1)
Feb. 3, 1973	Michigan Tech †	3–5	Loss	Student Ice Arena	Houghton, MI	19–6–1 (13–6–1 / 5–2–1)
Feb. 9, 1973	Michigan State ‡	5–2	Win	Dane County Coliseum	Madison, WI	20–6–1 (14–6–1 / 6–2–1)
Feb. 10, 1973	Michigan State ‡	6–4	Win	Dane County Coliseum	Madison, WI	21–6–1 (15–6–1 / 7–2–1)
Feb. 16, 1973	Minnesota–Duluth †	6–2	Win	Dane County Coliseum	Madison, WI	22–6–1 (16–6–1 / 7–2–1)
Feb. 17, 1973	Minnesota–Duluth †	9–2	Win	Dane County Coliseum	Madison, WI	23–6–1 (17–6–1 / 7–2–1)
Feb. 23, 1973	Notre Dame †	5–8	Loss	Joyce Center	Notre Dame, IN	23–7–1 (17–7–1 / 7–2–1)
Feb. 24, 1973	Notre Dame †	3–4	Loss	Joyce Center	Notre Dame, IN	23–8–1 (17–8–1 / 7–2–1)
Mar. 2, 1973	Minnesota †	3–4	Loss	Dane County Coliseum	Madison, WI	23–9–1 (17–9–1 / 7–3–1)
Mar. 3, 1973	Minnesota †	3–0	Win	Dane County Coliseum	Madison, WI	24–9–1 (18–9–1 / 8–3–1)
WCHA TOURNAMENT
Mar. 5, 1973	Minnesota	8–6	Win	Dane County Coliseum	Madison, WI	25–9–1 (18–9–1 / 8–3–1)
Mar. 6, 1973	Minnesota	6–4	Win	Dane County Coliseum	Madison, WI	26–9–1 (18–9–1 / 8–3–1)
Wisconsin Wins Series 14-10
Mar. 9, 1973	Notre Dame †	4–4*	Tie	Joyce Center	Notre Dame, IN	26–9–2 (18–9–1 / 8–3–1)
Mar. 10, 1973	Notre Dame †	4–3	Win	Joyce Center	Notre Dame, IN	27–9–2 (18–9–1 / 8–3–1)
Wisconsin Wins Series 8-7
NCAA TOURNAMENT
March 25, 1973	Cornell	6–5*	Win	Boston Garden	Boston, MA	28–9–2 (18–9–1 / 8–3–1)
March 26, 1973	Denver	4–2	Win	Boston Garden	Boston, MA	29–9–2 (18–9–1 / 8–3–1)
		217–139				29–9–2 (18–9–1 / 8–3–1)

* Denotes overtime periods
† WCHA game
‡ Big Ten and WCHA game
% St. Louis Invitational Tournament

== National championship ==
=== (W1) Denver vs. (W2) Wisconsin ===
March 17	Denver	2 – 4	Wisconsin	Boston Garden

Scoring summary
Period	Team	Goal	Assist(s)	Time	Score
1st	WIS	Dave Pay	Johnston and Eaves	3:05	1–0 WIS
1st	DEN	Jim Miller	McNab and Pearson	3:55	1–1
2nd	DEN	John Pearson – PP	McNab	:54	2–1 DEN
2nd	WIS	Tim Dool – PP	Cherrey and Bentley	4:17	2–2
2nd	WIS	Dean Talafous – GW	Lundeen and Deprez	8:30	3–2 WIS
3rd	WIS	Jim Johnston	Winchester and Pay	2:34	4–2 WIS
Penalty summary
Period	Team	Player	Penalty	Time	PIM
1st	WIS	Jim Johnston	Tripping	19:32	2:00
2nd	DEN	Bob Young	Interference	4:01	2:00
2nd	WIS	Peter McNab	High–Sticking	13:07	2:00
2nd	WIS	Dave Pay	Tripping	17:59	2:00
3rd	WIS	Dave Pay	High–Sticking	14:18	2:00

Shots by period
Team	1	2	3	T
Wisconsin	12	9	8	29
Denver	14	11	9	34

Goaltenders
Team	Name	Saves	Goals against	Time on ice
WIS	Jim Makey	32	2	
DEN	Ron Grahame	25	4	

Jim Makey, John Taft, Stan Hinkley and Dean Talafous were named to the All-Tournament Team

== Roster and scoring statistics ==
No.	Name	Year	Position	Hometown	S/P/C	Games	Goals	Assists	Pts	PIM
12	Dennis Olmstead	Freshman	C	Calgary, AB	(Alberta)	40	23	32	55	16
17	Dean Talafous	Sophomore	C	Duluth, MN	(Minnesota)	40	21	32	53	34
22	Lloyd "Max" Bentley	Junior	C	Sault Ste. Marie, ON	(Ontario)	40	23	29	52	29
8	Gary Winchester	Junior	C	Calgary, AB	(Alberta)	40	24	24	48	12
21	Norm Cherrey	Senior	RW	Souris, MB	(Manitoba)	39	24	21	45	10
9	Dave Pay	Freshman	LW	St. Catharines, ON	(Ontario)	36	18	17	35	36
10	Jim Johnston	Junior	RW	Peterborough, ON	(Ontario)	40	14	19	33	35
23	Tim Dool	Junior	LW	Sault Ste. Marie, ON	(Ontario)	40	12	19	31	22
20	Stan Hinkley	Junior	LW	Ponoka, AB	(Alberta)	40	12	18	30	48
7	John Taft	Freshman	D	Minneapolis, MN	(Minnesota)	40	9	18	27	28
4	Bob Lundeen	Sophomore	D	Minneapolis, MN	(Minnesota)	36	7	20	27	26
11	Steve Alley	Freshman	LW	Anoka, MN	(Minnesota)	40	8	15	23	12
5	Dave Arundel	Junior	D	Minneapolis, MN	(Minnesota)	40	1	18	19	26
15	Billy Reay, Jr.	Junior	RW	Chicago, IL	(Illinois)	32	10	6	16	38
3	Jack Johnson	Freshman	D	Bloomfield Hills, MI	(Michigan)	38	4	11	15	16
2	Tom Machowski	Sophomore	D	Chicago, IL	(Illinois)	40	1	13	14	48
19	Don Deprez	Sophomore	LW	Stony Mountain, MB	(Manitoba)	28	4	4	8	12
16	Bob Shaughnessy	Junior	C	Blind River, ON	(Ontario)	17	1	2	3	4
24	Doug Kelso	Senior	C	Madison, WI	(Wisconsin)	8	1	0	1	2
30	Doug McFadden	Sophomore	G	Peterborough, ON	(Ontario)	1	0	0	0	0
23	Steve Short	Freshman	D	Roseville, MN	(Minnesota)	2	0	0	0	4
1	Dick Perkins	Senior	G	St. Paul Park, MN	(Minnesota)	17	0	0	0	0
30	Jim Makey	Senior	G	Dunnville, ON	(Ontario)	22	0	0	0	0
13	Tom Kuklinski	Junior	LW	Mosinee, WI	(Wisconsin)	–	–	–	–	–
14	Ernie Blackburn	Senior	D	Bemidji, MN	(Minnesota)	–	–	–	–	–
18	Mark Lomenda	Freshman	RW	Esterhazy, SK	(Saskatchewan)	–	–	–	–	–
25	Chris Wright	Senior	C	Milwaukee, WI	(Wisconsin)	–	–	–	–	–
1	Doug Spitzig	Junior	G	Saskatoon, SK	(Saskatchewan)	–	–	–	–	–
Total						716	217	318	535	458

== Goaltending Statistics ==
No.	Name	Games	Minutes	Wins	Losses	Ties	Goals against	Saves	Shut outs	SV %	GAA
30	Doug McFadden	1	60	1	0	0	1	19	0	0.950	1.00
1	Dick Perkins	17	1021				58	478	2	0.892	3.41
30	Jim Makey	22	1322				79	680	0	0.896	3.59
Total		40	2403				138	1177	2	0.895	3.45

== Players drafted into the NHL/WHA ==
=== 1973 NHL Amateur Draft ===
= Did not play in the NHL

Round	Pick	Player	NHL team
4	53	Dean Talafous	Atlanta Flames
7	101	Tom Machowski	Atlanta Flames
9	132	Dave Pay	Toronto Maple Leafs
9	140	Jack Johnson	Chicago Black Hawks
9	141	Steve Alley	Chicago Black Hawks

=== 1973 WHA Amateur Draft ===
= Did not play in the WHA

Round	Pick	Player	WHA Team
1	13	Dean Talafous	Cincinnati Stingers
6	65	Dave Pay	Alberta Oilers
7	85	Tom Machowski	Minnesota Fighting Saints
7	90	Steve Alley	New England Whalers
10	113	Jack Johnson	Cincinnati Stingers

== See also ==
- 1973 NCAA University Division Men's Ice Hockey Tournament
- List of NCAA Division I Men's Ice Hockey Tournament champions
