= 1973 NCAA University Division men's ice hockey tournament =

College ice hockey tournament

- Teams: 4
- Finals site: Boston Garden, Boston, Massachusetts
- Champions: Wisconsin Badgers (1st title)
- Runner-up: none (Denver Pioneers vacated) (- title game)
- Semifinalists: Boston College Eagles (10th Frozen Four); Cornell Big Red (6th Frozen Four)
- Winning coach: Bob Johnson (1st title)
- MOP: Dean Talafous (Wisconsin)
- Attendance: 23,368

The 1973 NCAA Division I men's ice hockey tournament was the culmination of the 1972–73 NCAA Division I men's ice hockey season, the 26th such tournament in NCAA history. It was held between March 15 and 17, 1973, and concluded with Wisconsin defeating Denver 4–2. All games were played at the Boston Garden in Boston, Massachusetts.

After the tournament Denver's participation was vacated as a result of NCAA recruiting violations.

== Qualifying teams ==
Four teams qualified for the tournament, two each from the eastern and western regions. The ECAC tournament champion and the two WCHA tournament co-champions received automatic bids into the tournament. An at-large bid was offered to a second eastern team based upon both their ECAC tournament finish as well as their regular season record.

East							West						
Seed	School	Conference	Record	Berth type	Appearance	Last bid	Seed	School	Conference	Record	Berth type	Appearance	Last bid
1	Cornell	ECAC Hockey	23–3–1	Tournament champion	6th	1972	1	Denver	WCHA	28–8–1	Tournament co-champion	11th (vacated)	1972
2	Boston College	ECAC Hockey	21–6–1	At-Large	10th	1968	2	Wisconsin	WCHA	27–9–2	Tournament co-champion	3rd	1972

== Format ==
The ECAC champion was seeded as the top eastern team while the WCHA co-champion with the better regular season record was given the top western seed. The second eastern seed was slotted to play the top western seed and vice versa. All games were played at the Boston Garden. All matches were single-game eliminations with the semifinal winners advancing to the national championship game and the losers playing in a consolation game.

== Tournament bracket ==
Semifinals; March 15–16
E1	Cornell	5
W2	Wisconsin	6*
W1	Denver†	10
E2	Boston College	4

National Championship; March 17
W2	Wisconsin	4
W1	Denver†	2
Third place game
E1	Cornell	1
E2	Boston College	3

Note: * denotes overtime period(s)
Note: † Denver's participation was later vacated due to NCAA violations

=== Semifinals ===
==== (W1) Denver vs. (E2) Boston College ====
March 15	Denver	10 – 4	Boston College	Boston Garden	Recap
(McNab, Pearson) Bruce Affleck - PP - 08:07 (unassisted) John Clayton - 14:08 (Young, Miller) Ed Hays - PP - 16:15		First period	03:37 - Ed Kenty (unassisted)
(Palmer, Affleck) Pete McNab - 10:46 (Brandt) Mike Busniuk - GW - 12:11 (McNab, Affleck) Rich Preston - PP - 13:55 (Preston, Palmer) Pete McNab - 14:57		Second period	No scoring
(Tomassoni, Clayton) Ed Hays - 02:26 (Affleck, Palmer) Pete McNab - 05:53 (Affleck, McNab) Rob Palmer - 16:10		Third period	06:14 - Bob Reardon (Smith, Albrecht); 06:58 - Bob Reardon (Smith, Mellor); 18:35 - Bob Reardon (Smith)
( 30 saves / 34 shots ) Ron Grahame		Goalie stats	Ned Yetten ( 26 saves / 33 shots ) Neil Higgins ( 12 saves / 15 shots )

==== (E1) Cornell vs. (W2) Wisconsin ====
March 16	Cornell	5 – 6	OT	Wisconsin	Boston Garden
(Kuzmicz, Bo. Murray) Doug Marrett - 00:40 (Ceci) Paul Perras - 08:52		First period		No scoring
(Bi. Murray, Bo. Murray) George Kuzmicz - 00:31 (Skillins, Peace) Mike McGuire - 04:39		Second period		12:03 - PP - Norm Cherrey (Bentley, Talafous); 18:28 - Dennis Olmstead (Hinkley)
(unassisted) Bill Murray - 00:40		Third period		08:16 - Gary Winchester (Pay, Hinkley); 16:49 - Jim Johnston (Winchester, Taft); 19:55 - EA - Dean Talafous (Hinkley, Olmstead)
No scoring		First overtime period		09:27 - GW - Dean Talafous (Olmstead, Alley)
( 35 saves / 36 shots ) Dave Elenbaas		Goalie stats		Dick Perkins ( 24 saves / 27 shots )

=== Consolation Game ===
==== (E1) Cornell vs. (E2) Boston College ====
March 17	Cornell	1 – 3	Boston College	Boston Garden
No Scoring		First period	No scoring
No scoring		Second period	00:22 - Bob Reardon (Mellor); 12:25 - Ed Kenty (unassisted)
(Ugolini) Doug Marrett - 08:42		Third period	19:59 - EN - Jim Doyle (Smith, Reardon)
( 26 saves / 28 shots ) Dave Elenbaas		Goalie stats	Neil Higgins ( 46 saves / 47 shots )

=== National Championship ===
==== (W1) Denver vs. (W2) Wisconsin ====
March 17	Denver	2 – 4	Wisconsin	Boston Garden

Scoring summary
Period	Team	Goal	Assist(s)	Time	Score
1st	WIS	Dave Pay	Johnston and Eaves	3:05	1–0 WIS
1st	DEN	Jim Miller	McNab and Pearson	13:55	1–1
2nd	DEN	John Pearson – PP	McNab	20:54	2–1 DEN
2nd	WIS	Tim Dool – PP	Cherrey and Bentley	24:17	2–2
2nd	WIS	Dean Talafous – GW	Lundeen and Deprez	28:30	3–2 WIS
3rd	WIS	Jim Johnston	Winchester and Pay	42:34	4–2 WIS
Penalty summary
Period	Team	Player	Penalty	Time	PIM
1st	WIS	Jim Johnston	Tripping	19:32	2:00
2nd	DEN	Bob Young	Interference	24:01	2:00
2nd	WIS	Peter McNab	High-sticking	33:07	2:00
2nd	WIS	Dave Pay	Tripping	37:59	2:00
3rd	WIS	Dave Pay	High-sticking	54:18	2:00

Shots by period
Team	1	2	3	T
Wisconsin	12	9	8	29
Denver	14	11	9	34

Goaltenders
Team	Name	Saves	Goals against	Time on ice
WIS	Jim Makey	32	2	
DEN	Ron Grahame	25	4	

== All-Tournament Team ==
- G: Jim Makey (Wisconsin)
- D: vacated†
- D: John Taft (Wisconsin)
- F: Stan Hinkley (Wisconsin)
- F: vacated†
- F: Dean Talafous* (Wisconsin)

* Most Outstanding Player(s)
† Recognition of Denver's D: Bruce Affleck and F: Peter McNab was vacated when Denver's participation in the tournament was vacated
