= 1960–61 NCAA men's ice hockey season =

- Duration: November 1960– March 18, 1961
- NCAA tournament: 1961
- National championship: University of Denver Arena; Denver, Colorado
- NCAA champion: Denver

The 1960–61 NCAA men's ice hockey season began in November 1960 and concluded with the 1961 NCAA Men's Ice Hockey Tournament's championship game on March 18, 1961 at the University of Denver Arena in Denver, Colorado. This was the 14th season in which an NCAA ice hockey championship was held and is the 67th year overall where an NCAA school fielded a team.

== Regular season ==
=== Season tournaments ===
Tournament	Dates	Teams	Champion
Cornell Invitational	December 19–21	6	Bowdoin, Williams
Boston Arena Christmas Tournament	December 27–29	6	Providence
Rensselaer Holiday Tournament	December 28–30	4	Rensselaer
Beanpot	February 6, 13	4	Boston College

=== Standings ===
1960–61 Big Ten standings
	Conference							Overall					
	GP	W	L	T	PTS	GF	GA	GP	W	L	T	GF	GA
Michigan†	8	6	2	0	12	34	21	28	16	10	2	108	89
Minnesota	8	5	3	0	10	36	32	29	17	11	1	126	111
Michigan State	8	1	7	0	2	22	39	27	11	16	0	121	115
† indicates conference regular season champion

1960–61 NCAA Independent ice hockey standings
	Intercollegiate							Overall					
	GP	W	L	T	Pct.	GF	GA	GP	W	L	T	GF	GA
Amherst	–	–	–	–	–	–	–	17	4	13	0	–	–
American International	–	–	–	–	–	–	–	17	5	12	0	–	–
Army	21	13	8	0	.619	107	58	25	17	8	0	139	62
Boston College	–	–	–	–	–	–	–	25	19	5	1	143	55
Boston University	24	10	14	0	.417	98	104	24	10	14	0	98	104
Bowdoin	–	–	–	–	–	–	–	20	15	5	0	–	–
Brown	–	–	–	–	–	–	–	20	0	20	0	30	117
Colby	–	–	–	–	–	–	–	23	18	5	0	–	–
Colgate	–	–	–	–	–	–	–	24	8	15	1	88	110
Connecticut	–	–	–	–	–	–	–	11	4	6	1	55	69
Cornell	–	–	–	–	–	–	–	19	7	12	0	66	58
Dartmouth	–	–	–	–	–	–	–	19	8	11	0	87	118
Hamilton	–	–	–	–	–	–	–	17	2	14	1	–	–
Harvard	–	–	–	–	–	–	–	24	18	4	2	106	47
Massachusetts	–	–	–	–	–	–	–	14	7	6	1	45	69
Merrimack	–	–	–	–	–	–	–	12	5	7	0	52	64
Middlebury	16	14	2	0	.875	158	44	21	19	2	0	192	56
MIT	–	–	–	–	–	–	–	14	8	6	0	–	–
New Hampshire	–	–	–	–	–	–	–	14	3	11	0	41	74
Northeastern	–	–	–	–	–	–	–	26	12	14	0	106	131
Norwich	–	–	–	–	–	–	–	21	10	11	0	–	–
Princeton	–	–	–	–	–	–	–	23	9	14	0	82	127
Providence	–	–	–	–	–	–	–	20	11	9	0	120	90
St. Olaf	–	–	–	–	–	–	–	7	3	4	0	–	–
Williams	–	–	–	–	–	–	–	20	16	4	0	–	–
Yale	–	–	–	–	–	–	–	25	12	12	1	92	94

1960–61 Minnesota Intercollegiate Athletic Conference ice hockey standings
	Conference							Overall					
	GP	W	L	T	PTS	GF	GA	GP	W	L	T	GF	GA
Minnesota–Duluth †	5	5	0	0	1.000	–	–	16	13	3	0	–	–
Augsburg	7	2	5	0	.286	–	–	11	3	8	0	–	–
Concordia	–	–	–	–	–	–	–	9	2	7	0	–	–
Gustavus Adolphus	–	–	–	–	–	–	–	12	4	7	1	–	–
Hamline	–	–	–	–	–	–	–	–	–	–	–	–	–
Macalester	–	–	–	–	–	–	–	–	–	–	–	–	–
Saint John's	–	–	–	–	–	–	–	15	9	6	0	–	–
Saint Mary's	–	–	–	–	–	–	–	8	1	6	1	–	–
St. Thomas	–	–	–	–	–	–	–	10	6	4	0	–	–
† indicates conference champion

1960–61 Tri-State League standings
	Conference							Overall					
	GP	W	L	T	PTS	GF	GA	GP	W	L	T	GF	GA
St. Lawrence†	4	3	1	0	6	14	15	21	16	5	0	123	78
Rensselaer	4	2	2	0	4	18	14	22	16	5	1	135	66
Clarkson	4	1	3	0	2	13	16	22	14	8	0	104	84
† indicates conference regular season champion

1960–61 Western Collegiate Hockey Association standings
	Conference							Overall					
	GP	W	L	T	PCT	GF	GA	GP	W	L	T	GF	GA
Denver†*	18	17	1	0	.944	127	31	32	30	1	1	242	59
Minnesota*	20	14	6	0	.700	100	68	29	17	11	1	126	111
Michigan	24	15	8	1	.646	97	79	28	16	10	2	108	89
Michigan Tech	24	13	11	0	.542	92	58	29	16	13	0	132	78
North Dakota	24	7	16	0	.313	81	133	29	9	19	1	100	151
Michigan State	20	5	15	0	.250	55	90	27	11	16	0	121	115
Colorado College	22	4	18	0	.182	68	161	24	4	20	0	76	175
Championship: Minnesota, Denver † indicates conference regular season champion * indicates conference tournament champion

== 1961 NCAA Tournament ==
Semifinals; March 16–17
E1	St. Lawrence	6
E2	Rensselaer	3
W1	Denver	6
W2	Minnesota	1

National championship March 18
E1	St. Lawrence	2
W1	Denver	12
Third-place game
E2	Rensselaer	3
W2	Minnesota	4

Note: * denotes overtime period(s)

== Player stats ==
=== Scoring leaders ===
The following players led the league in points at the conclusion of the season.

GP = Games played; G = Goals; A = Assists; Pts = Points; PIM = Penalty minutes

Player	Class	Team	GP	G	A	Pts	PIM
Phil Latreille	Senior	Middlebury	21	80	28	108	-
Jerry Walker	Junior	Denver	32	56	29	85	-
Bill Masterton	Senior	Denver	32	24	56	80	4
Bill Daley	Senior	Boston College	-	33	41	74	-
Tom Roe	Sophomore	Williams	20	34	33	67	-
Art Chisholm	Senior	Northeastern	25	35	26	61	25
Red Martin	Senior	Boston College	-	13	40	53	–
Marshall Tschida	Junior	Providence	–	27	25	52	-
Mike Denihan	Sophomore	Boston University	24	30	20	50	6
Trevor Kaye	Junior	Rensselaer	22	24	26	50	4

=== Leading goaltenders ===
The following goaltenders led the league in goals against average at the end of the regular season while playing at least 33% of their team's total minutes.

GP = Games played; Min = Minutes played; W = Wins; L = Losses; OT = Overtime/shootout losses; GA = Goals against; SO = Shutouts; SV% = Save percentage; GAA = Goals against average

Player	Class	Team	GP	Min	W	L	OT	GA	SO	SV%	GAA
George Kirkwood	Senior	Denver	32	-	30	1	1	59	4	.910	1.84
Jim Logue	Senior	Boston College	-	-	-	-	-	-	-	-	2.17
Ron Chisholm	Junior	Army	25	1483	17	8	0	61	3	.900	2.47
Bill Rowe	Senior	Michigan Tech	-	-	-	-	-	-	-	.891	2.72
Stu Benton	Junior	Rensselaer	20	1190	15	4	1	55	1	.892	2.77
Wayne Gibbons	Sophomore	Clarkson	15	-	9	-	-	-	-	.878	2.80
Mike Haley	Senior	Minnesota-Duluth	13	-	-	-	-	-	-	.904	3.00
Laing Kennedy	Sophomore	Cornell	19	-	-	-	-	-	-	.913	3.05
Joe Sherin	Senior	St. Lawrence	10	607	-	-	-	32	0	.888	3.16
Mike Larson	Sophomore	Minnesota	17	-	-	-	-	-	-	-	3.20

== Awards ==
=== NCAA ===
Award		Recipient
Spencer Penrose Award		Murray Armstrong, Denver
Most Outstanding Player in NCAA Tournament		Bill Masterton, Denver
AHCA All-American Teams
East Team	Position	West Team
Rod Blackburn, New Hampshire	G	George Kirkwood, Denver
Arlie Parker, St. Lawrence	D	Marty Howe, Denver
Red Martin, Boston College	D	Grant Munro, Denver
Terry Slater, St. Lawrence	F	Red Berenson, Michigan
Phil Latreille, Middlebury	F	Bill Masterton, Denver
Art Chisholm, Northeastern	F	Jerry Walker, Denver

=== WCHA ===
Award		Recipient
Most Valuable Player		Jerry Walker, Denver
Sophomore of the Year		Jack Wilson, Denver
Coach of the Year		Murray Armstrong, Denver
All-WCHA Teams
First Team	Position	Second Team
George Kirkwood, Denver	G	Bill Rowe, Michigan Tech
Marty Howe, Denver	D	John Palenstein, Michigan
George Konik, Denver	D	Henry Akervall, Michigan Tech
Red Berenson, Michigan	F	Lou Angotti, Michigan Tech
Bill Masterton, Denver	F	Bill Colpitts, North Dakota
Jerry Walker, Denver	F	Jerry Sullivan, Michigan Tech
