= Grant Munro (ice hockey) =

Canadian ice hockey player (1936–2019)

- Born: August 7, 1936 Regina, Saskatchewan, Canada
- Died: December 30, 2019 (aged 83) Brunswick, Maine, U.S.
- Height: 6 ft 3 in (191 cm)
- Weight: 195 lb (88 kg; 13 st 13 lb)
- Position: Defenseman
- Played for: Denver
- Playing career: 1958–1962

Warren Grant Munro (August 7, 1936 – December 30, 2019) was a Canadian ice hockey defenseman who was an All-American for Denver and helped the team win consecutive national championships in the early-1960s.

== Career ==
Munro grew up in Regina and played for his home town junior team, the Regina Pats. He helped the club win consecutive Abbott Cups in 1955 and 1956. In 1957, he followed his former junior coach Murray Armstrong to the University of Denver and began playing for the Pioneers. He joined the varsity squad in 1958. Munro helped the team win championships in 1960 and 1961 and was an All-American in his senior season. In the 1961 championship, he recorded four points in Denver's 12–2 win, setting a record for defensemen in a title match. Munro earned a bachelor's degree in accounting.

== Career ==
After graduating from college, Munro briefly played professional hockey for the Omaha Knights/Toledo Mercurys in the International Hockey League, but retired after the 1962 season. Munro worked as a hockey coach at North Yarmouth Academy in the 1980s and founded co-founded the Casco Bay Hockey Association. He was also a linesman for the Maine Mariners.

== Personal life ==
Munro and his wife, Ileen, moved to Maine in 1967 and remained there until his death due to complications from Parkinson's disease in 2019.

== Career statistics ==
			Regular Season					Playoffs
Season	Team	League	GP	G	A	Pts	PIM	GP	G	A	Pts	PIM
1953–54	Regina Pats	WCJHL	—	—	—	—	—	—	—	—	—	—
1954–55	Regina Pats	WCJHL	34	3	4	7	0	—	—	—	—	—
1955–56	Regina Pats	WCJHL	—	—	—	—	—	—	—	—	—	—
1956–57	Regina Pats	SJHL	49	8	15	23	34	—	—	—	—	—
1958–59	Denver	NCAA	26	6	17	23	—	—	—	—	—	—
1959–60	Denver	WCHA	34	5	13	18	28	—	—	—	—	—
1960–61	Denver	WCHA	32	11	16	27	38	—	—	—	—	—
1961–62	Omaha Knights	IHL	—	—	—	—	—	—	—	—	—	—
1961–62	Toledo Mercurys	IHL	7	0	1	1	2	—	—	—	—	—
NCAA Totals			92	22	46	68	—	—	—	—	—	—

== Awards and honors ==
Award	Year
AHCA West All-American	1960–61
NCAA All-Tournament First Team	1961
