= 1961 NCAA men's ice hockey tournament =

College ice hockey tournament

- Teams: 4
- Finals site: University of Denver Arena, Denver, Colorado
- Champions: Denver Pioneers (3rd title)
- Runner-up: St. Lawrence Saints (1st title game)
- Semifinalists: Minnesota Golden Gophers (3rd Frozen Four); Rensselaer Engineers (3rd Frozen Four)
- Winning coach: Murray Armstrong (3rd title)
- MOP: Bill Masterton (Denver)
- Attendance: 19,826

The 1961 NCAA Men's Ice Hockey Tournament was the culmination of the 1960–61 NCAA men's ice hockey season, the 14th such tournament in NCAA history. It was held between March 16 and 18, 1961, and concluded with Denver defeating St. Lawrence 12–2. All games were played at the University of Denver Arena in Denver, Colorado.

This was the first time in the history of the tournament that teams from the same conference would play each other in the opening round. The next occurrence would not happen until 2008.

Denver's 10-point margin of victory is the largest ever for a title game and the second most for one team in the championship match, behind only Colorado College in both 1950 and 1957. (as of 2016)

== Qualifying teams ==
Four teams qualified for the tournament, two each from the eastern and western regions. The WCHA tournament co-champions received automatic bids into the tournament. Two at-large bids were offered to eastern teams based upon both their regular season record and strength of competition.

East							West						
Seed	School	Conference	Record	Berth type	Appearance	Last bid	Seed	School	Conference	Record	Berth type	Appearance	Last bid
1	St. Lawrence	Tri-State League	15–4–0	At-Large	6th	1960	1	Denver	WCHA	28–1–1	Tournament co-champion	3rd	1960
2	Rensselaer	Tri-State League	16–3–1	At-Large	3rd	1954	2	Minnesota	WCHA	16–10–1	Tournament co-champion	3rd	1954

== Format ==
The higher-ranked eastern team was seeded as the top eastern team while the WCHA champion with the better conference record was given the top western seed. Because Minnesota refused to schedule Denver beginning this season as a result of a disagreement over recruiting practices, the two western participants had not yet played each other during the season. As a result, the NCAA broke with tradition and pitted the two against one another in the semifinals, leaving the two eastern teams to face one another in the other semifinal game. All games were played at the University of Denver Arena. All matches were Single-game eliminations with the semifinal winners advancing to the national championship game and the losers playing in a consolation game.

== Bracket ==
Semifinals; March 16–17
E1	St. Lawrence	6
E2	Rensselaer	3
W1	Denver	6
W2	Minnesota	1

National championship March 18
E1	St. Lawrence	2
W1	Denver	12
Third-place game
E2	Rensselaer	3
W2	Minnesota	4

Note: * denotes overtime period(s)

=== Semifinals ===
==== St. Lawrence vs. Rensselaer ====
March 16	St. Lawrence	6 – 3	Rensselaer	University of Denver Arena	Recap
(Slater) Rollie Anderson - PP - 11:19 (unassisted) Rollie Anderson - SH - 18:56		First period	6:32 - PP - Jim Josephson (Sieminski); 08:48 - Dick Sieminski (Kaye)
(unassisted) Terry Slater - 01:12 (R. Mason) John Mason - GW - 07:08		Second period	No scoring
(Brown, Tessier) Duncan Campbell - 07:03 (R. Mason) Gary Corby - 19:36		Third period	19:01 - Jim Josephson (Dunn, Astill)
(36 saves) Richie Broadbelt		Goalie stats	Stu Benton (32 saves)

==== Denver vs. Minnesota ====
March 17	Denver	6 – 1	Minnesota	University of Denver Arena	Recap
(Johnston, Josephson) George Konik - 11:49 (Art) Bill Masterton - GW - 13:41 (Lomnes, Munro) Paul Josephson - 15:36 (Munro) Marshall Johnston - 18:51		First period	09:01 - Dave Brooks (Schmaltzbauer, Lilyholm)
(Walker, Howe) Bill Masterton - 04:00 (Masterton, Beatty) Jerry Walker - 16:42		Second period	No scoring
No scoring		Third period	No scoring
(11 saves) George Kirkwood		Goalie stats	Mike Larson (30 saves)

=== Consolation Game ===
==== Rensselaer vs. Minnesota ====
March 18	Rensselaer	3 – 4	Minnesota	University of Denver Arena	Recap
No scoring		First period	10:42 - Ron Constantine (Smith)
(Robins, Sieminski) Jim Josephson - PP - 14:51		Second period	11:11 - PP - Larry Smith (Constantine, Nanne); 17:41 - PP - Len Lilyholm (Meredith)
(Robins) Trevor Kaye - 01:15 (Josephson) John Chiarelli - 12:14		Third period	16:32 - GW - Oscar Mahle (Constantine, Nanne)
(15 saves) Stu Benton		Goalie stats	Mike Larson (26 saves)

=== National Championship ===
==== Denver vs. St. Lawrence ====
March 18	Denver	12 – 2	St. Lawrence	University of Denver Arena

Scoring summary
Period	Team	Goal	Assist(s)	Time	Score
1st	SLU	John Mason	R. Mason and Corby	1:22	1–0 SLU
1st	DEN	Bill Masterton	Beatty and Walker	3:19	1–1
1st	DEN	Trent Beatty	Masterton and Munro	7:21	2–1 DEN
1st	DEN	Jerry Walker – GW	Beatty	12:09	3–1 DEN
1st	SLU	Buster Dower	Slater	13:14	3–2 DEN
1st	DEN	Jerry Duffus	Williamson and Art	14:51	4–2 DEN
1st	DEN	Bill Masterton	Walker and Munro	15:49	5–2 DEN
2nd	DEN	Trent Beatty	Masterton and Walker	25:33	6–2 DEN
2nd	DEN	Grant Munro	Lomnes	26:57	7–2 DEN
2nd	DEN	George Konik – PP	Josephson and Wilson	31:31	8–2 DEN
2nd	DEN	Ken Williamson – PP	Art and Wilson	37:47	9–2 DEN
3rd	DEN	Bill Masterton – PP	Konik	50:46	10–2 DEN
3rd	DEN	Grant Munro – PP	Josephson	52:15	11–2 DEN
3rd	DEN	Terry Lomnes	unassisted	56:57	12–2 DEN
Penalty summary
Period	Team	Player	Penalty	Time	PIM
1st	SLU	Ron Mason	Hooking	8:10	2:00
1st	DEN	Marty Howe	Elbowing	15:54	2:00
1st	SLU	Roland Anderson	Slashing	15:54	2:00
2nd	SLU	Arlie Parker	Cross-checking	30:54	2:00
2nd	DEN	Jack Wilson	Tripping	32:37	2:00
2nd	DEN	Jack Wilson	Tripping	34:58	2:00
2nd	SLU	Arlie Parker	Checking in offensive zone	36:50	2:00
3rd	DEN	Grant Munro	Tripping (penalty shot missed by Roland Anderson)	45:13	2:00
3rd	SLU	Terry Slater	High-sticking (injury)	50:15	5:00
3rd	DEN	Trent Beatty	Interference	59:54	2:00

Shots by period
Team	1	2	3	T
St. Lawrence	6	8	5	19
Denver	20	17	13	50

Goaltenders
Team	Name	Saves	Goals against	Time on ice
SLU	Richie Broadbelt	38	12	
DEN	George Kirkwood	17	2	

== All-Tournament team ==
=== First Team ===
- G: Mike Larson (Minnesota)
- D: Marty Howe (Denver)
- D: Grant Munro (Denver)
- F: Trent Beatty (Denver)
- F: Bill Masterton* (Denver)
- F: Jerry Walker (Denver)

* Most Outstanding Player(s)

=== Second Team ===
- G: George Kirkwood (Denver)
- D: George Konik (Denver)
- D: Arlie Parker (St. Lawrence)
- F: Terry Slater (St. Lawrence)
- F: Jim Josephson (Rensselaer)
- F: Ron Constantine (Minnesota)

== See also ==
- 1961 WCHA Men's Ice Hockey Tournament
