= Bob Boyd (ice hockey) =

Canadian ice hockey player (born 1951)

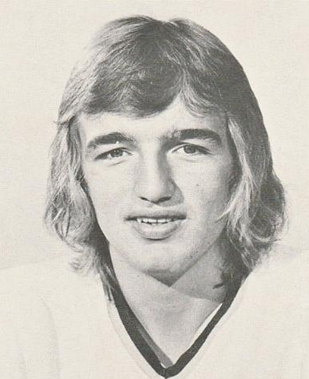
- Born: November 27, 1951 (age 74) Toronto, Ontario, Canada
- Height: 6 ft 0 in (183 cm)
- Weight: 190 lb (86 kg; 13 st 8 lb)
- Position: Defence
- Shot: Right
- Played for: Minnesota Fighting Saints
- NHL draft: 100th overall, 1971; Detroit Red Wings
- Playing career: 1973–1975

Robert "Bob" Boyd (born November 27, 1951) is a Canadian former professional ice hockey defenceman who played in the World Hockey Association (WHA).

== Career ==
Boyd was drafted in the eighth round of the 1971 NHL Amateur Draft by the Detroit Red Wings. He played parts of two WHA seasons with the Minnesota Fighting Saints.

== Career statistics ==
=== Regular season and playoffs ===
			Regular season					Playoffs
Season	Team	League	GP	G	A	Pts	PIM	GP	G	A	Pts	PIM
1968–69	Niagara Falls Flyers	OHA	50	2	5	7	40	—	—	—	—	—
1969–70	Niagara Falls Flyers	OHA	35	10	17	27	78	—	—	—	—	—
1970–71	Michigan State University	WCHA	31	10	23	33	88	—	—	—	—	—
1971–72	Michigan State University	WCHA	34	4	26	30	72	—	—	—	—	—
1972–73	Michigan State University	WCHA	35	7	41	48	124	—	—	—	—	—
1973–74	Suncoast Suns	SHL	20	4	14	18	15	—	—	—	—	—
1973–74	Winston-Salem Polar Twins	SHL	19	1	7	8	6	—	—	—	—	—
1973–74	Minnesota Fighting Saints	WHA	41	1	14	15	14	7	0	0	0	4
1974–75	Minnesota Fighting Saints	WHA	13	0	0	0	21	—	—	—	—	—
1974–75	Johnstown Jets	NAHL	43	6	21	27	77	15	1	13	14	2
WHA totals			54	1	14	15	35	7	0	0	0	4

== Awards and honours ==
Award	Year
All-WCHA Second Team	1971–72
All-WCHA Second Team	1972–73
AHCA West All-American	1972–73
