= Pat Boutette =

Canadian ice hockey player

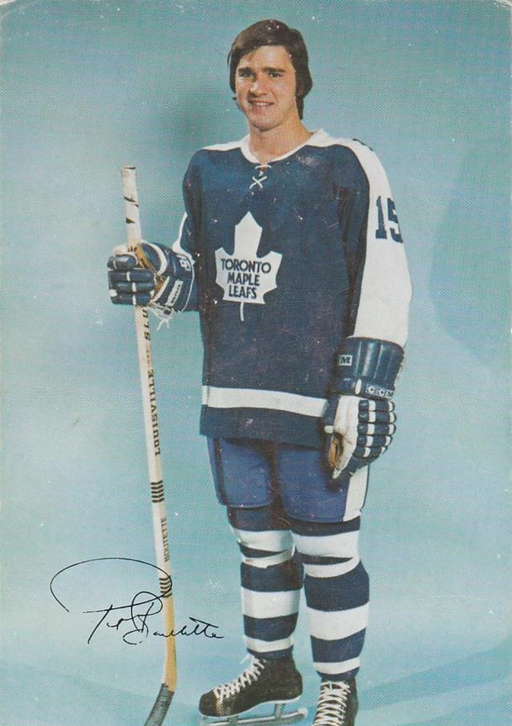
- Boutette in 1975 postcard
- Born: March 1, 1952 (age 74) Windsor, Ontario, Canada
- Height: 5 ft 8 in (173 cm)
- Weight: 175 lb (79 kg; 12 st 7 lb)
- Position: Centre
- Shot: Left
- Played for: Toronto Maple Leafs; Hartford Whalers; Pittsburgh Penguins
- National team: Canada
- NHL draft: 139th overall, 1972; Toronto Maple Leafs
- Playing career: 1970–1985

Patrick Michael Boutette (born March 1, 1952) is a Canadian former professional ice hockey centre. He played in the National Hockey League with the Toronto Maple Leafs, Hartford Whalers, and Pittsburgh Penguins between 1975 and 1985. Internationally he played for the Canadian national team at the 1981 World Championships.

== Playing career ==
Born in Windsor, Ontario, Boutette began playing hockey at the University of Minnesota-Duluth from 1970-1973. He would play with the Toronto Maple Leafs, Hartford Whalers, and Pittsburgh Penguins. Boutette retired from the National Hockey League following 752 games, recording 171 goals and 282 assists for 453 points as well as 1354 penalty minutes.

== Career statistics ==
=== Regular season and playoffs ===
			Regular season					Playoffs
Season	Team	League	GP	G	A	Pts	PIM	GP	G	A	Pts	PIM
1969–70	London Knights	OHA	53	11	17	28	87	10	1	4	5	66
1970–71	University of Minnesota-Duluth	WCHA	33	18	13	31	86	—	—	—	—	—
1971–72	University of Minnesota-Duluth	WCHA	34	17	20	37	71	—	—	—	—	—
1972–73	University of Minnesota-Duluth	WCHA	36	18	45	63	91	—	—	—	—	—
1973–74	Oklahoma City Blazers	CHL	70	17	34	51	118	10	0	7	7	35
1974–75	Oklahoma City Blazers	CHL	77	26	42	68	163	5	2	4	6	4
1975–76	Toronto Maple Leafs	NHL	77	10	22	32	140	10	1	4	5	16
1976–77	Toronto Maple Leafs	NHL	80	18	18	36	107	9	0	4	4	17
1977–78	Toronto Maple Leafs	NHL	80	17	19	36	120	13	3	3	6	40
1978–79	Toronto Maple Leafs	NHL	80	14	19	33	136	6	2	2	4	22
1979–80	Toronto Maple Leafs	NHL	32	0	4	4	17	—	—	—	—	—
1979–80	Hartford Whalers	NHL	47	13	31	44	75	3	1	0	1	6
1980–81	Hartford Whalers	NHL	80	28	52	80	160	—	—	—	—	—
1981–82	Pittsburgh Penguins	NHL	80	23	51	74	230	5	3	1	4	8
1982–83	Pittsburgh Penguins	NHL	80	27	29	56	152	—	—	—	—	—
1983–84	Pittsburgh Penguins	NHL	73	14	26	40	142	—	—	—	—	—
1984–85	Pittsburgh Penguins	NHL	14	1	3	4	24	—	—	—	—	—
1984–85	Hartford Whalers	NHL	33	6	8	14	51	—	—	—	—	—
1984–85	Binghamton Whalers	AHL	27	8	17	25	10	7	0	2	2	0
NHL totals			756	171	282	453	1,354	46	10	14	24	109

=== International ===
Year	Team	Event	GP	G	A	Pts	PIM
1981	Canada	WC	8	1	1	2	16
Senior totals			8	1	1	2	16

== Awards and honors ==
Award	Year
All-WCHA Second Team	1972–73
AHCA West All-American	1972–73
