= Rob Palmer (ice hockey, born 1952) =

American ice hockey player

- Born: October 2, 1952 (age 73) Detroit, Michigan, United States
- Height: 6 ft 0 in (183 cm)
- Weight: 190 lb (86 kg; 13 st 8 lb)
- Position: Forward
- Shot: Left
- Played for: Chicago Black Hawks
- NHL draft: 93rd overall, 1972; Chicago Black Hakws
- Playing career: 1973–1977

Robert Hazen Palmer (born October 2, 1952) is an American former professional ice hockey player who played 16 games in the National Hockey League with the Chicago Black Hawks between 1973 and 1975. He played his college hockey at the University of Denver, where he was an all-American.

== Career statistics ==
=== Regular season and playoffs ===
			Regular season					Playoffs
Season	Team	League	GP	G	A	Pts	PIM	GP	G	A	Pts	PIM
1969–70	Detroit Olympics	OHA-B	40	62	58	120	26	—	—	—	—	—
1970–71	University of Denver	WCHA	36	14	23	37	14	—	—	—	—	—
1971–72	University of Denver	WCHA	36	14	25	39	20	—	—	—	—	—
1972–73	University of Denver	WCHA	37	23	39	62	12	—	—	—	—	—
1973–74	Chicago Black Hawks	NHL	1	0	0	0	0	—	—	—	—	—
1973–74	Dallas Black Hawks	CHL	49	11	16	27	44	10	3	0	3	4
1974–75	Chicago Black Hawks	NHL	13	0	2	2	2	—	—	—	—	—
1974–75	Dallas Black Hawks	CHL	55	12	34	46	32	10	2	9	11	14
1975–76	Chicago Black Hawks	NHL	2	0	1	1	0	—	—	—	—	—
1975–76	Dallas Black Hawks	CHL	62	14	17	31	56	10	4	3	7	2
1976–77	IFK Luleå	SWE-2	20	12	9	21	—	—	—	—	—	—
1976–77	Fort Worth Texans	CHL	3	0	2	2	0	5	0	0	0	0
CHL totals			169	37	69	106	132	35	9	12	21	20
NHL totals			16	0	3	3	2	—	—	—	—	—

== Awards and honors ==
Award	Year
All-WCHA First Team	1972–73
AHCA West All-American	1972–73
