= George Konik =

Canadian-American ice hockey player

- Born: May 4, 1937 Flin Flon, Manitoba, Canada
- Died: October 21, 2016 (aged 79) Eagan, Minnesota, U.S.
- Height: 5 ft 11 in (180 cm)
- Weight: 190 lb (86 kg; 13 st 8 lb)
- Position: Defence
- Shot: Left
- Played for: Pittsburgh Penguins; Minnesota Fighting Saints
- National team: United States
- Playing career: 1961–1973

George Samuel Konik (May 4, 1937 – October 21, 2016) was a Canadian-born American professional ice hockey player. He grew up in his hometown of Flin Flon where he graduated from high school. He played hockey from the peewee to junior level winning a Canadian junior championship with the Flin Flon Bombers in 1957. He also was a catcher in baseball and won the batting title in the senior Polar League in 1958. He played 52 games in the National Hockey League with the Pittsburgh Penguins during the 1967–68 season and 54 games in the World Hockey Association with the Minnesota Fighting Saints during the 1972–73 season. Internationally he played for the American national team at the 1970 and 1971 World Championships. He was inducted into the Manitoba Hockey Hall of Fame and his 1957 Bombers team has been inducted into both the provincial hockey and sports halls of fame.

== Career ==
Konik was a star on the University of Denver hockey team which won the NCAA hockey championship in 1960 and 1961. He signed a professional contract with the New York Rangers after that but did not make his NHL debut until 1967–68 after the expansion Pittsburgh Penguins traded for his rights. Konik made 52 appearances as a versatile role player for the Penguins that season, but drifted back to the minor professional leagues after that.

Konik (who settled in Minnesota in 1964) eventually became a naturalized American citizen and joined the United States national team for the 1970 and 1971 Ice Hockey World Championship tournaments; he was named best defenceman in 1970. Konik came out of retirement in 1972/73 to play a final season of major league pro hockey for the WHA Minnesota Fighting Saints before leaving hockey for good. Konik died in the morning of October 21, 2016; his death was announced later that day by the Penguins' official Twitter account.

== Business career ==
After hockey Konik founded George Konik Associates, a technical staffing firm in 1974 and Maple Leaf Travel in 1982.

== Career statistics ==
=== Regular season and playoffs ===
| | | | Regular season | | | | | Playoffs |
| Season | Team | League | GP | G | A | Pts | PIM | GP | G | A | Pts | PIM |
|---|---|---|---|---|---|---|---|---|---|---|---|---|
| 1952–53 | Flin Flon Bombers | SJHL | 5 | 0 | 0 | 0 | 4 | — | — | — | — | — |
| 1953–54 | Flin Flon Bombers | SJHL | 4 | 0 | 2 | 2 | 4 | 2 | 0 | 0 | 0 | 0 |
| 1953–54 | Flin Flon Bombers | M-Cup | — | — | — | — | — | 2 | 0 | 0 | 0 | 2 |
| 1954–55 | Flin Flon Bombers | SJHL | 12 | 9 | 5 | 14 | 18 | — | — | — | — | — |
| 1955–56 | Flin Flon Bombers | SJHL | 37 | 13 | 21 | 34 | 83 | 12 | 4 | 6 | 10 | 12 |
| 1955–56 | Flin Flon Bombers | M-Cup | — | — | — | — | — | 7 | 3 | 2 | 5 | 2 |
| 1956–57 | Flin Flon Bombers | SJHL | 53 | 35 | 41 | 76 | 73 | 10 | 5 | 7 | 12 | 7 |
| 1956–57 | Flin Flon Bombers | M-Cup | — | — | — | — | — | 16 | 6 | 3 | 9 | 44 |
| 1957–58 | Flin Flon Bombers | M-Cup | — | — | — | — | — | 16 | 6 | 4 | 10 | 42 |
| 1958–59 | University of Denver | NCAA | 28 | 21 | 23 | 44 | 75 | — | — | — | — | — |
| 1959–60 | University of Denver | NCAA | 34 | 13 | 28 | 41 | 50 | — | — | — | — | — |
| 1960–61 | University of Denver | NCAA | 27 | 12 | 19 | 31 | 40 | — | — | — | — | — |
| 1961–62 | Los Angeles Blades | WHL | 43 | 3 | 8 | 11 | 38 | — | — | — | — | — |
| 1962–63 | Seattle Totems | WHL | 42 | 7 | 12 | 19 | 50 | 17 | 4 | 1 | 5 | 38 |
| 1963–64 | Baltimore Clippers | AHL | 72 | 19 | 22 | 41 | 80 | — | — | — | — | — |
| 1964–65 | St. Paul Saints | USHL | — | — | — | — | — | — | — | — | — | — |
| 1965–66 | Minnesota Rangers | CPHL | 38 | 10 | 20 | 30 | 35 | 7 | 2 | 5 | 7 | 6 |
| 1966–67 | Omaha Knights | CPHL | 66 | 27 | 47 | 74 | 109 | 12 | 4 | 8 | 12 | 24 |
| 1967–68 | Baltimore Clippers | AHL | 5 | 0 | 2 | 2 | 7 | — | — | — | — | — |
| 1967–68 | Pittsburgh Penguins | NHL | 52 | 7 | 8 | 15 | 26 | — | — | — | — | — |
| 1968–69 | Rochester Mustangs | USHL | — | — | — | — | — | — | — | — | — | — |
| 1969–70 | American National Team | Intl | 6 | 3 | 5 | 8 | 4 | — | — | — | — | — |
| 1970–71 | American National Team | Intl | — | — | — | — | — | — | — | — | — | — |
| 1972–73 | Minnesota Fighting Saints | WHA | 54 | 4 | 12 | 16 | 34 | — | — | — | — | — |
| WHA totals | | | 54 | 4 | 12 | 16 | 34 | — | — | — | — | — |
| NHL totals | | | 52 | 7 | 8 | 15 | 26 | — | — | — | — | — |

=== International ===
| Year | Team | Event | GP | G | A | Pts | PIM |
|---|---|---|---|---|---|---|---|
| 1970 | United States | WC-B | 7 | 4 | 7 | 11 | 4 |
| 1971 | United States | WC | 9 | 1 | 1 | 2 | 8 |
| Senior totals | | | 16 | 5 | 8 | 13 | 12 |

== Awards and honors ==
| Award | Year |
|---|---|
| All-WCHA Second Team | 1959–60 |
| AHCA West All-American | 1959–60 |
| NCAA All-Tournament First Team | 1960 |
| All-WCHA First Team | 1960–61 |
| NCAA All-Tournament Second Team | 1961 |

- Central Professional Hockey League First All-Star Team (1967)
- 1970 World Ice Hockey Championships Pool B (WEC-B) All-Star Team (1970)
- Named Best Defenseman at WEC-B (1970)
- Named to WCHA Top 50 Players in 50 Years
- Inducted into the Manitoba Hockey Hall of Fame (2011)
- January 31, 1968 - George Konik scores on the first penalty shot in franchise history at St. Louis beating Glenn Hall in a 9-4 Penguins loss.
