= Jerry Walker (ice hockey) =

American ice hockey player

- Born: 1938 (age 87–88) Balcarres, Saskatchewan, Canada
- Height: 5 ft 11 in (180 cm)
- Weight: 170 lb (77 kg; 12 st 2 lb)
- Position: Winger
- Played for: University of Denver; Omaha Knights; Jacksonville Rockets
- Playing career: 1959–1969

Jerry Walker (born 1938) is a Canadian retired ice hockey winger who was one of the most prolific goal scorers in NCAA history. He was an All-American in 1961 and helped Denver win consecutive national championships.

== Career ==
Walker was one of several players who played on the Regina Pats in the mid-1950s to be recruited by their former coach Murray Armstrong to play for the University of Denver. He joined the varsity squad as a sophomore in 1959 and started scoring goals for the Pioneers immediately. He recorded 31 in his first season to lead the team and scored the first goal in Denver's championship victory. Walker became the star of the team the following season when he set numerous program and conference records by scoring 56 goals in 32 games. He was the first player named as the WCHA Most Valuable Player and was first team First Team All-WCHA and an All-American. In the NCAA Tournament Walker was one of the focal points of the offense and led Denver to a second consecutive championship as well as a 30–1–1 record to complete one of the most dominant seasons in NCAA history.

Despite having a year of eligibility remaining, Walker left Denver after 1961 and played professional and senior hockey for the remainder of the decade before retiring in 1969. He was inducted into the Denver Athletic Hall of Fame in 1999. Walker is still regarded as one of, if not the greatest goal-scorers in the history of the Denver Pioneers. Among the Denver Pioneers records he still holds are goals in a season (56), goals per game (1.32), hat-tricks (13), hat-tricks in one season (10), and he held the record for most goals in a season by any WCHA player until 1986.

== Career statistics ==
			Regular Season					Playoffs
Season	Team	League	GP	G	A	Pts	PIM	GP	G	A	Pts	PIM
1955–56	Regina Pats	WCJHL	—	—	—	—	—	—	—	—	—	—
1956–57	Regina Pats	SJHL	43	18	19	37	14	—	—	—	—	—
1959–60	Denver	WCHA	34	31	19	50	—	—	—	—	—	—
1960–61	Denver	WCHA	32	56	29	85	—	—	—	—	—	—
1961–62	Omaha Knights	IHL	45	15	22	37	21	—	—	—	—	—
1962–63	Saskatoon Quakers	SSHL	—	—	—	—	—	—	—	—	—	—
1963–64	Yorkton Terriers	SSHL	—	—	—	—	—	—	—	—	—	—
1964–65	Jacksonville Rockets	EHL	71	30	36	66	14	—	—	—	—	—
1965–66	Yorkton Terriers	SSHL	—	23	22	45	—	—	—	—	—	—
1968–69	Edmonton Monarchs	ASHL	—	—	—	—	—	—	—	—	—	—
NCAA Totals			66	87	48	135	—	—	—	—	—	—

== Awards and honors ==
Award	Year
All-WCHA First Team	1960–61
AHCA West All-American	1960–61
NCAA All-Tournament First Team	1961

Awards and achievements
Preceded by Award Created	WCHA Most Valuable Player; 1960–61	Succeeded by Red Berenson
