= Dean Talafous =

American ice hockey player

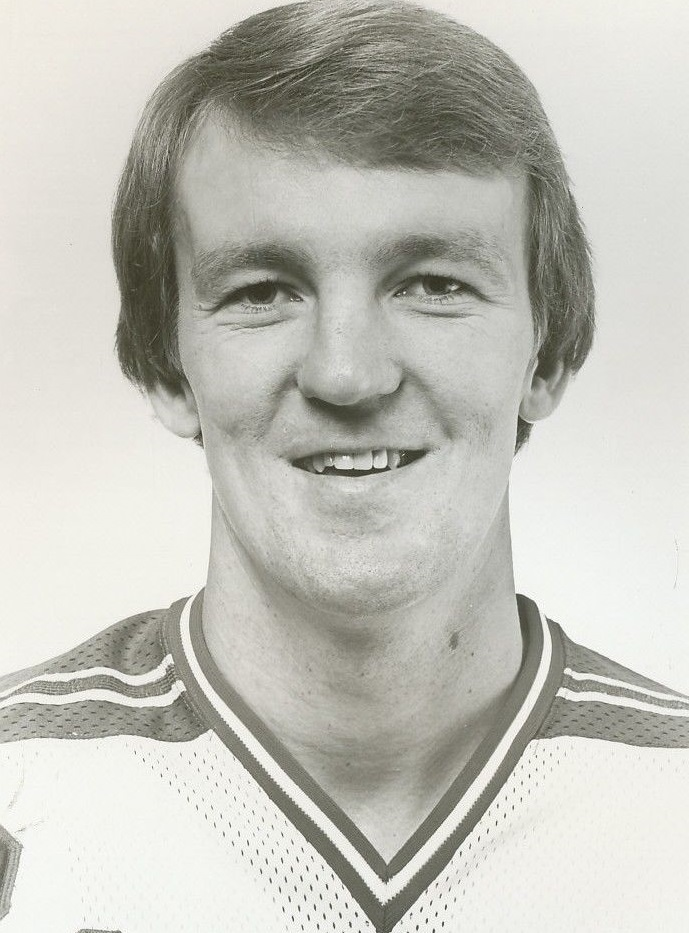
- Born: August 25, 1953 (age 73) Duluth, Minnesota, U.S.
- Height: 6 ft 4 in (193 cm)
- Weight: 180 lb (82 kg; 12 st 12 lb)
- Position: Right wing
- Shot: Right
- Played for: Atlanta Flames; Minnesota North Stars; New York Rangers
- National team: United States
- NHL draft: 53rd overall, 1973; Atlanta Flames
- WHA draft: 13th overall, 1973; Cincinnati Stingers
- Playing career: 1974–1981
- Coaching career

Playing career
- 1971–1974: Wisconsin
- Position: Right wing

Coaching career (HC unless noted)
- 1982–1984: Minnesota (assistant)
- 1984–1985: St. Paul Vulcans
- 1985–1989: Minnesota (assistant)
- 1989–1996: Wisconsin–River Falls
- 1996–2001: Alaska-Anchorage

Head coaching record
- Overall: 160-196-40 (.455)

Accomplishments and honors

Awards
- 1996 Edward Jeremiah Award

Dean Charles Talafous (/ˈtælæfəs/ TA-la-fəs; born August 25, 1953) is an American former professional ice hockey player. He played 497 regular season games in the National Hockey League (NHL) between 1974 and 1981 for the Atlanta Flames, Minnesota North Stars and New York Rangers as a right winger.

== College ==
Talafous played for the Wisconsin Badgers where he helped the team win a National Championship in 1973, and was named the tournament's Most Outstanding Player. Talafous scored the winning goal in the championship game.

== Playing career ==
Talafous was drafted 53rd overall by the Atlanta Flames in the 1973 NHL entry draft. He scored his first NHL goal on December 12, 1974 at Washington in a 2-2 tie. It was the only goal Talafous scored as an Atlanta Flame. Talafous played 18 games for the Flames before being traded to the Minnesota North Stars. In international hockey he played for the United States in the 1976 Canada Cup and 1981 Canada Cup. In 1978 Talafous signed as a free agent with the New York Rangers.

On December 30, 1981, the Rangers traded him with Jere Gillis to the Quebec Nordiques for Robbie Ftorek, however, Talafous decided to retire after learning that the Nordiques would not offer him a contract past the end of the season. The Rangers were then forced to give up Pat Hickey as compensation.

== Coaching ==
=== Juniors ===
- Head of player development - [ Hudson Crusaders ] MJHL
- Head Coach - St. Paul Vulcans USHL

== Head coaching record ==
Record table
Season	Team	Overall	Conference	Standing	Postseason
Wisconsin–River Falls Falcons (NCHA) (1989–1996)
1989–90	Wisconsin–River Falls	13-13-3			NCHA Semifinals
1990–91	Wisconsin–River Falls	6-18-3			
1991–92	Wisconsin–River Falls	6-17-1			
1992–93	Wisconsin–River Falls	19-13-1			NCAA Runner-Up
1993–94	Wisconsin–River Falls	21-8-4			NCAA Champion
1994–95	Wisconsin–River Falls	19-10-4			NCAA Frozen Four
1995–96	Wisconsin–River Falls	26-5-2			NCAA Frozen Four
Wisconsin–River Falls:		110-84-18			
Alaska–Anchorage Seawolves (WCHA) (1996–2001)
1996–97	Alaska–Anchorage	9-23-4	7-21-4	9th	WCHA First Round
1997–98	Alaska–Anchorage	6-25-5	5-19-4	9th	WCHA First Round
1998–99	Alaska–Anchorage	13-18-5	10-13-5	6th	WCHA First Round
1999–00	Alaska–Anchorage	15-18-3	11-14-3	7th	WCHA First Round
2000–01	Alaska–Anchorage	7-24-5	4-20-4	9th	WCHA First Round
Alaska–Anchorage:		50-108-22	37-87-20		
Total:		160-196-40			
National champion Postseason invitational champion Conference regular season champion Conference regular season and conference tournament champion Division regular season champion Division regular season and conference tournament champion Conference tournament champion

== After hockey ==
Talafous lives in Hudson, Wisconsin, and founded Total Hockey Training with his wife, Jax, and son, Pete; Talafous retired in 2011 and Pete now runs the organization as Exceed Hockey. In 2013 Talafous was inducted in the Badger Athletic Hall of Fame.

== Awards and honors ==
Award	Year
All-NCAA All-Tournament Team	1973

== Career statistics ==
=== Regular season and playoffs ===
			Regular season					Playoffs
Season	Team	League	GP	G	A	Pts	PIM	GP	G	A	Pts	PIM
1968–69	Hastings High School	HS-MN	—	—	—	—	—	—	—	—	—	—
1969–70	Hastings High School	HS-MN	—	—	—	—	—	—	—	—	—	—
1970–71	Hastings High School	HS-MN	—	—	—	—	—	—	—	—	—	—
1971–72	University of Wisconsin	WCHA	37	10	24	34	42	—	—	—	—	—
1972–73	University of Wisconsin	WCHA	40	21	32	53	34	—	—	—	—	—
1973–74	University of Wisconsin	WCHA	34	17	29	46	29	—	—	—	—	—
1974–75	Atlanta Flames	NHL	18	1	4	5	13	—	—	—	—	—
1974–75	Omaha Knights	CHL	11	3	5	8	10	—	—	—	—	—
1974–75	Minnesota North Stars	NHL	43	8	17	25	6	—	—	—	—	—
1975–76	Minnesota North Stars	NHL	79	18	30	48	18	—	—	—	—	—
1976–77	Minnesota North Stars	NHL	80	22	27	49	10	2	0	0	0	0
1977–78	Minnesota North Stars	NHL	75	13	16	29	25	—	—	—	—	—
1978–79	New York Rangers	NHL	68	13	16	29	29	—	—	—	—	—
1979–80	New York Rangers	NHL	55	10	20	30	26	5	1	2	3	9
1980–81	New York Rangers	NHL	50	13	17	30	28	14	3	5	8	2
1981–82	New York Rangers	NHL	29	6	7	13	8	—	—	—	—	—
NHL totals			497	104	154	258	163	21	4	7	11	11

=== International ===
Year	Team	Event	GP	G	A	Pts	PIM
1973	United States	WC B	7	2	8	10	—
1974	United States	WC B	—	—	—	—	—
1976	United States	CC	5	2	2	4	8
1981	United States	CC	6	3	2	5	0
Canada Cup totals			11	5	4	9	8

Awards and achievements
Preceded by Tim Regan	NCAA Tournament Most Outstanding Player; 1973	Succeeded by Brad Shelstad
Preceded by Bill Beaney	Edward Jeremiah Award; 1995–96	Succeeded by Mike McShane
