= 1972–73 NCAA University Division men's ice hockey season =

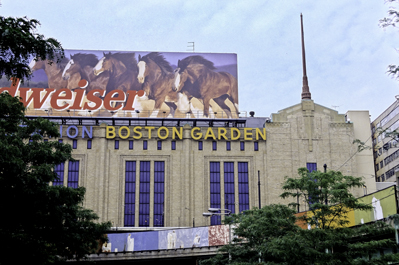
- The Boston Garden served as the host for the 1973 Tournament
- Duration: November 1972– March 17, 1973
- NCAA tournament: 1973
- National championship: Boston Garden; Boston, Massachusetts
- NCAA champion: Wisconsin

The 1972–73 NCAA University Division men's ice hockey season began in November 1972 and concluded with the 1973 NCAA University Division Men's Ice Hockey Tournament's championship game on March 17, 1973 at the Boston Garden in Boston, Massachusetts. This was the 26th season in which an NCAA ice hockey championship was held and is the 79th year overall where an NCAA school fielded a team.

After the season Denver's participation in the NCAA tournament was vacated due to violations of NCAA regulations.

After the season Army was classified as a Division II squad as part of the NCAA's numerical classification system.

Lake Superior State began to sponsor their ice hockey program and the team was promptly admitted into the CCHA.

== Season Outlook ==
=== Pre-season poll ===
The top teams in the nation voted on by coaches before the start of the season.

Bob Olson, owner of radio station WMPL, started compiling a national poll in 1972.

WMPL Poll
Rank	Team
1	Wisconsin (5)
2	North Dakota (1)
3	Harvard
4	Denver
5	Michigan Tech (1)
6	Cornell
7	Boston College (1)
8	Notre Dame
9	Boston University
10	Clarkson

=== Pre-season conference polls ===
Conference pre-season polls as voted on by coaches.

ECAC Poll
Rank	Team
1	Harvard
2	Cornell
3	Boston University
4	Clarkson
5	Pennsylvania
6	Rensselaer
7	New Hampshire (1)
8	Providence
9	Brown
10	Boston College
11	Dartmouth
12	St. Lawrence
13	Yale
14	Colgate
15	Northeastern
16	Princeton
17	Army

CCHA Poll
Rank	Team
1	Saint Louis
2	Bowling Green
3	Lake Superior State
4	Ohio State
5	Ohio

WCHA Poll
Rank	Team
1	Wisconsin (7)
2	North Dakota (2)
3	Denver
4	Michigan Tech (1)
5	Notre Dame
6	Michigan State
7	Minnesota Duluth
8	Colorado College
9	Minnesota
10	Michigan

== Regular season ==
=== Season tournaments ===
Tournament	Dates	Teams	Champion
Christmas City of the North Tournament	November 23–25	4	Minnesota–Duluth†
North Country Thanksgiving Festival	November 23–25	4	Clarkson
Cleveland Cup Invitational	November 29–30	4	Michigan State
Yale Invitational	December 18–19	4	Northeastern
ECAC Christmas Tournament	December 19–20	4	Dartmouth
ECAC Holiday Hockey Festival	December 19–20	4	Saint Louis
Great Lakes Invitational	December 27–28	4	Harvard
Williams Invitational	December 27–29	4	Bowdoin
Rensselaer Holiday Tournament	December 28–30	4	Minnesota–Duluth
St. Louis Fireman's Invitational	December 28–30	4	Wisconsin
Nichols School Invitational	December 29–30	4	St. Lawrence
Syracuse Invitational	December 29–30	4	Clarkson
Beanpot	February 5, 12	4	Boston University

†Boston University won the tournament but was forced to forfeit each of the three games played after the conclusion of the season.

=== Standings ===
1972–73 Big Ten standings
	Conference							Overall					
	GP	W	L	T	PTS	GF	GA	GP	W	L	T	GF	GA
Wisconsin†	12	8	3	1	17	60	40	40	29	9	2	217	139
Michigan State†	12	8	3	1	17	60	44	36	23	12	1	194	149
Minnesota	12	5	4	3	13	50	47	34	15	16	3	124	129
Michigan	12	1	11	0	2	40	75	34	6	27	1	136	206
† indicates conference regular season champion

1972–73 Central Collegiate Hockey Association standings
	Conference							Overall					
	GP	W	L	T	PTS	GF	GA	GP	W	L	T	GF	GA
Saint Louis†	16	13	3	0	26	116	52	38	27	11	0	266	162
Lake Superior State	12	9	3	0	18	82	53	30	20	10	0	201	129
Ohio State	14	7	7	0	14	76	65	30	18	11	1	179	141
Bowling Green*	16	6	10	0	12	95	94	35	16	19	0	193	191
Ohio	14	1	13	0	2	36	141	24	6	18	0	—	—
Championship: Bowling Green † indicates conference regular season champion * indicates conference tournament champion

1972–73 ECAC Hockey standings
	Conference							Overall					
	GP	W	L	T	Pct.	GF	GA	GP	W	L	T	GF	GA
Cornell†*	18	14	3	1	.806	81	60	29	23	5	1	156	92
Harvard†	18	14	3	1	.806	117	62	22	17	4	1	141	79
Boston College	19	13	5	1	.711	118	88	30	22	7	1	188	121
Pennsylvania	22	13	7	2	.636	90	78	27	16	9	2	115	97
New Hampshire	19	11	8	0	.579	93	87	29	16	10	3	129	121
Clarkson	20	11	9	0	.550	101	82	33	18	15	0	176	137
Rensselaer	20	11	9	0	.550	87	67	31	16	15	0	142	124
Boston University^	18	9	8	1	.528	100	51	29	11	17	1	174	86
Brown	19	10	9	0	.526	72	75	23	11	12	0	84	96
Northeastern	21	10	11	0	.476	93	98	29	17	12	0	144	125
St. Lawrence	18	8	10	0	.444	87	89	28	15	13	0	149	131
Dartmouth	20	8	11	1	.425	74	85	24	12	11	1	106	93
Yale	15	5	9	1	.367	47	69	23	12	10	1	102	89
Providence	17	6	11	0	.353	62	79	25	11	14	0	107	110
Colgate	17	5	12	0	.294	58	94	25	11	14	0	107	165
Princeton	21	3	18	0	.143	55	123	23	5	18	0	66	127
Army	10	1	9	0	.100	28	64	27	9	17	1	121	136
Championship: Cornell † indicates conference regular season champion * indicates conference tournament champion^ Boston University was required to forfeit 11 after the season for using an ineligible player

1972–73 NCAA University Division Independent ice hockey standings
	Conference							Overall					
	GP	W	L	T	PTS	GF	GA	GP	W	L	T	GF	GA
Air Force	0	0	0	0	-	-	-	32	16	16	0	166	190
Alaska–Fairbanks	0	0	0	0	-	-	-	25	14	10	1	-	-

1972–73 Western Collegiate Hockey Association standings
	Conference							Overall					
	GP	W	L	T	PTS	GF	GA	GP	W	L	T	GF	GA
Denver†*	28	20	8	0	52	141	85	39	29	9	1	208	116
Notre Dame	28	19	9	0	48	150	119	38	23	14	1	199	174
Wisconsin*	28	18	9	1	47	134	101	40	29	9	2	217	139
Michigan State	26	16	9	1	47	132	114	36	23	12	1	194	149
Michigan Tech	26	16	10	0	44	135	106	38	24	13	1	198	139
Minnesota	28	12	13	3	35	94	102	34	15	16	3	124	129
North Dakota	30	13	15	2	32	124	131	36	17	17	2	154	157
Minnesota-Duluth	28	13	15	0	30	123	131	36	19	17	0	166	161
Colorado College	28	5	23	0	14	103	171	34	10	24	0	150	198
Michigan	30	4	25	1	11	116	183	34	6	27	1	136	206
Championship: Wisconsin, Denver † indicates conference regular season champion * indicates conference tournament champion

=== Final regular season polls ===
The final top 10 teams as ranked by coaches (WMPL) before the conference tournament finals.

WMPL Media Poll
Ranking	Team
1	Denver (5)
2	Wisconsin
3	Cornell (2)
4	Notre Dame
5	Harvard (1)
6	Boston University (1)
7	Boston College
8	Michigan State
9	Michigan Tech
10	Saint Louis

== 1973 NCAA Tournament ==
Semifinals; March 15–16
E1	Cornell	5
W2	Wisconsin	6*
W1	Denver†	10
E2	Boston College	4

National Championship; March 17
W2	Wisconsin	4
W1	Denver†	2
Third Place Game
E1	Cornell	1
E2	Boston College	3

Note: * denotes overtime period(s)
Note: † Denver's participation was later vacated due to NCAA violations

== Player stats ==
=== Scoring leaders ===
The following players led the league in points at the conclusion of the season.

GP = Games played; G = Goals; A = Assists; Pts = Points; PIM = Penalty minutes

Player	Class	Team	GP	G	A	Pts	PIM
Rick Kennedy	Sophomore	Saint Louis	38	47	49	96	22
Eddie Bumbacco	Junior	Notre Dame	38	43	47	90	38
John Nestic	Junior	Saint Louis	38	37	46	83	6
Dave Davies	Junior	Saint Louis	38	31	47	78	8
George Clark	Sophomore	Army	-	39	33	72	-
Peter McNab	Junior	Denver	38	32	40	72	18
Sean Coughlan	Sophomore	Saint Louis	38	26	46	72	20
Ian Williams	Junior	Notre Dame	35	35	34	69	54
Carlo Ugolini	Junior	Cornell	29	25	44	69	18
Ray Meyers	Junior	Ohio State	30	33	35	68	44

=== Leading goaltenders ===
The following goaltenders led the league in goals against average at the end of the regular season while playing at least 33% of their team's total minutes.

GP = Games played; Min = Minutes played; W = Wins; L = Losses; OT = Overtime/shootout losses; GA = Goals against; SO = Shutouts; SV% = Save percentage; GAA = Goals against average

Player	Class	Team	GP	Min	W	L	OT	GA	SO	SV%	GAA
Ron Grahame	Senior	Denver	35	2094	27	7	1	102	2	.921	2.90
Ed Walsh	Sophomore	Boston University	27	1612	-	-	-	79	0	.911	2.94
Dave Elenbaas	Junior	Cornell	29	-	-	-	-	-	-	.905	3.06
Rick Quance	Sophomore	Michigan Tech	17	1031	11	4	1	55	0	.905	3.20
Brad Shelstad	Junior	Minnesota	23	1345	-	-	-	74	0	.906	3.30
Cap Raeder	Freshman	New Hampshire	20	1200	9	7	2	67	1	.897	3.35
Dick Perkins	Sophomore	Wisconsin	17	1021	-	-	-	58	2	.892	3.41
Kevin Woods	Senior	Clarkson	14	789	11	-	-	46	2	.893	3.50
Ned Yetten	Sophomore	Boston College	20	1180	15	4	1	70	1	.895	3.56
Don Cutts	Junior	Rensselaer	30	1800	-	-	-	109	1	.898	3.63

== Awards ==
=== NCAA ===
Award		Recipient
Spencer Penrose Award		Len Ceglarski, Boston College
Most Outstanding Player in NCAA Tournament		Dean Talafous, Wisconsin
AHCA All-American Teams
East Team	Position	West Team
Ed Walsh, Boston University	G	Ron Grahame, Denver
Tom Mellor, Boston College	D	Bob Boyd, Michigan State
Keith Smith, Brown	D	Bill Nyrop, Notre Dame
Gordie Clark, New Hampshire	F	Pat Boutette, Minnesota-Duluth
Steve Dolloff, Boston University	F	Eddie Bumbacco, Notre Dame
Bob McManama, Harvard	F	Rob Palmer, Denver

=== CCHA ===
No Awards
All-CCHA Teams
First Team	Position	Second Team
Ralph Kloiber, Saint Louis	G	Don Boyd, Bowling Green
	G	Don Muio, Lake Superior State
Roger Archer, Bowling Green	D	Chuck Gyles, Bowling Green
Bill Slewidge, Lake Superior State	D	Jim Witherspoon, Ohio State
Rick Kennedy, Saint Louis	F	Julio Francella, Lake Superior State
John Nestic, Saint Louis	F	Mike Bartley, Bowling Green
Ray Meyers, Ohio State	F	Dave Davies, Saint Louis

=== ECAC ===
Award		Recipient
Player of the Year		Tom Mellor, Boston College
Rookie of the Year		Vic Stanfield, Boston University
Most Outstanding Player in Tournament		Carlo Ugolini, Cornell
All-ECAC Hockey Teams
First Team	Position	Second Team
Ned Yetten, Boston College	G	Don Cutts, Rensselaer
Tom Mellor, Boston College	D	Bill Murray, Cornell
Vic Stanfield, Boston University	D	Keith Smith, Brown
Gordie Clark, New Hampshire	F	Bill Corkery, Harvard
Bob McManama, Harvard	F	Steve Dolloff, Boston University
Carlo Ugolini, Cornell	F	Dave Wisener, Boston University

=== WCHA ===
Award		Recipient
Most Valuable Player		Ron Grahame, Denver
Freshman of the Year		Mike Zuke, Michigan Tech
Coach of the Year		Lefty Smith, Notre Dame
All-WCHA Teams
First Team	Position	Second Team
Ron Grahame, Denver	G	Jim Makey, Wisconsin
Bob Boyd, Michigan State	D	Bill Nyrop, Notre Dame
Bruce Affleck, Denver	D	Jim Nahrgang, Michigan Tech
Rob Palmer, Denver	F	Ian Williams, Notre Dame
Eddie Bumbacco, Notre Dame	F	Norm Cherrey, Wisconsin
Peter McNab, Denver	F	Pat Boutette, Minnesota-Duluth

== 1973 NHL Amateur Draft ==
Round	Pick	Player	College	Conference	NHL team
3	46	John Campbell ^{‡}	Notre Dame	WCHA	Atlanta Flames
4	53	Dean Talafous	Wisconsin	WCHA	New York Rangers
4	56	Alan Hangsleben	North Dakota	WCHA	Montreal Canadiens
5	67	Paul O'Neil	Boston University	ECAC Hockey	Vancouver Canucks
5	69	John Flesch	Lake Superior State	CCHA	Atlanta Flames
6	81	Kevin Smith	Brown	ECAC Hockey	New York Islanders
7	97	Don Cutts	Rensselaer	ECAC Hockey	New York Islanders
7	101	Tom Machowski	Wisconsin	WCHA	Atlanta Flames
7	108	Bob Young	Denver	WCHA	Buffalo Sabres
8	117	Bob Law	North Dakota	WCHA	Atlanta Flames
8	122	Norm Barnes	Michigan State	WCHA	Philadelphia Flyers
8	123	George Lyle ^{†}	Michigan Tech	WCHA	Detroit Red Wings
9	129	Bob Lorimer	Michigan Tech	WCHA	New York Islanders
9	132	Dave Pay	Wisconsin	WCHA	Toronto Maple Leafs
9	136	Jim Johnston	Wisconsin	WCHA	Minnesota North Stars
9	140	Jack Johnson	Wisconsin	WCHA	Chicago Black Hawks
9	141	Steve Alley	Wisconsin	WCHA	Chicago Black Hawks
10	144	Lee Palmer	Clarkson	ECAC Hockey	Toronto Maple Leafs
10	147	Bob Peace	Cornell	ECAC Hockey	Toronto Maple Leafs
10	154	Ken Gibb	North Dakota	WCHA	Detroit Red Wings
10	155	Mitch Brandt	Denver	WCHA	Detroit Red Wings
10	156	Rick Clubbe	North Dakota	WCHA	Chicago Black Hawks
11	160	Angie Moretto	Michigan	WCHA	California Golden Seals
11	162	Greg Fox	Michigan	WCHA	Atlanta Flames
12	167	Cap Raeder	New Hampshire	ECAC Hockey	Montreal Canadiens

† incoming freshman
‡ John Campbell had left school after the previous season

== See also ==
- 1972–73 NCAA College Division men's ice hockey season
