= Bob Lundeen =

American ice hockey player

Personal information
- Born: November 4, 1952 (age 73) Minneapolis, Minnesota, United States

Sport
- Sport: Ice hockey

Bob Lundeen (born November 4, 1952) is an American ice hockey player. He competed in the men's tournament at the 1976 Winter Olympics.
