= Murray Armstrong =

Canadian ice hockey player

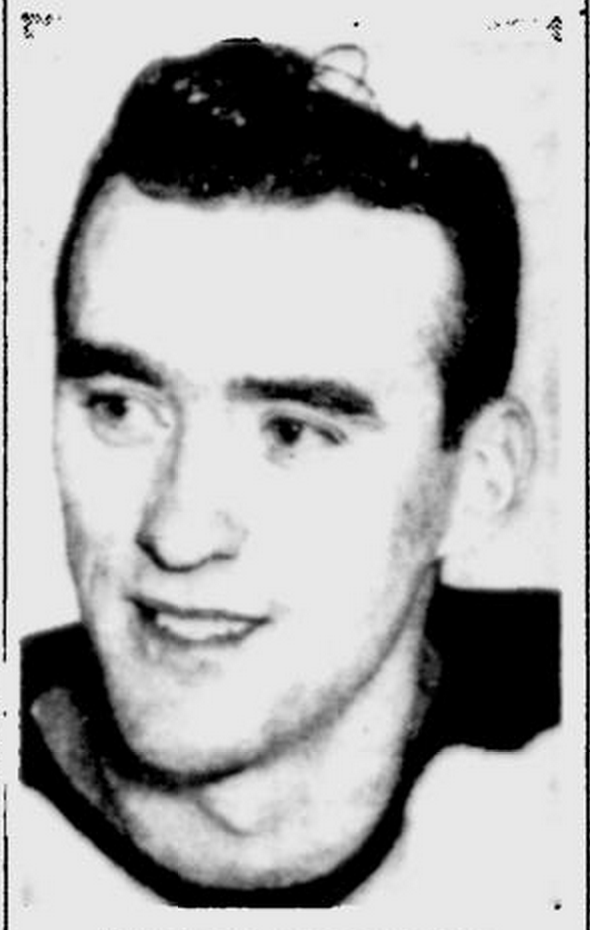
- Born: January 1, 1916 Manor, Saskatchewan, Canada
- Died: December 8, 2010 (aged 94) St. Augustine, Florida, U.S.
- Height: 5 ft 10 in (178 cm)
- Weight: 170 lb (77 kg; 12 st 2 lb)
- Position: Centre
- Shot: Left
- Playing career: 1937–1946
- Coaching career

Playing career
- 1931–1934: Regina Pats
- 1934–1935: Regina Victorias
- 1935–1936: New York Rovers
- 1936–1939: Syracuse Stars
- 1937–1939: Toronto Maple Leafs
- 1939–1942: New York Americans
- 1942–1943: Regina Army Caps
- 1943–1946: Detroit Red Wings
- 1946–1947: Buffalo Bisons
- 1946–1947: Dallas Texans
- Position: Center

Coaching career (HC unless noted)
- 1948–1956: Regina Pats
- 1956–1977: Denver

Head coaching record
- Overall: 460–215–31 (.674)
- Tournaments: 15–7 (.682)

Accomplishments and honors

Championships
- 1937 Calder Cup; 1958 WIHL regular season champion 1958 NCAA National Champion; 1960 WCHA regular season champion 1960 WCHA tournament champion 1960 NCAA National Champion; 1961 WCHA regular season champion 1961 WCHA tournament champion 1961 NCAA National Champion; 1963 WCHA regular season champion 1963 WCHA tournament champion 1964 WCHA tournament champion 1966 WCHA tournament champion 1968 WCHA regular season champion 1968 WCHA tournament champion 1968 NCAA National Champion; 1969 WCHA tournament champion 1969 NCAA National Champion; 1971 WCHA tournament champion 1972 WCHA regular season champion 1972 WCHA tournament champion 1973 WCHA regular season champion 1973 WCHA tournament champion

Awards
- 1947 Herman W. Paterson Cup; 1961 WCHA Coach of the Year; 1961 Spencer Penrose Award; 1968 WCHA Coach of the Year; 1974 Colorado Sports Hall of Fame; 1977 Lester Patrick Trophy; 1981 Saskatchewan Sports Hall of Fame; 1984 Hobey Baker Legend of College Hockey Award; 1996 Denver Athletic Hall of Fame; 2000 Denver Athletic Hall of Fame (Team); 2004 Denver Athletic Hall of Fame (Team); 2006 Denver Athletic Hall of Fame (Team); 2008 Denver Athletic Hall of Fame (Team); 2010 Denver Athletic Hall of Fame (Team)

Murray Alexander Armstrong (January 1, 1916 – December 8, 2010) was a Canadian professional ice hockey centre and National Collegiate Athletic Association (NCAA) ice hockey Head Coach.

== Playing career ==
Armstrong played junior hockey with the Regina Pats before debuting with the Toronto Maple Leafs of the National Hockey League (NHL) in the 1937–38 season. Two years later he was involved in one of the biggest trades of the decade. He, Busher Jackson, Buzz Boll, and Doc Romnes were sent to the New York Americans in exchange for Sweeney Schriner. He played three years with New York before World War II, during which he went on to play and coach for the Regina Army Caps. Following his army service, Armstrong was signed by Jack Adams in Detroit, but halfway through his third season he was demoted after Adams called up an 18-year-old named Gordon Howe. In 270 career NHL games, Armstrong scored 67 goals and 121 assists for 188 points.

Following his retirement, Armstrong went on to coach the Regina Pats from 1950–55, and the University of Denver from 1956 to 1977, winning five NCAA Championships, in 1958, 1960, 1961, 1968 and 1969. He is considered one of the top NCAA coaches of all time.

He retired to St. Augustine, Florida, where he remained an avid golfer into his 90s.

His son Rob Armstrong is a former CBS News journalist and the current Retired Professional in Residence at Flagler College.

He died in St. Augustine, Florida on December 8, 2010.

== Awards and achievements ==
- EAHL Second All-Star Team (1936)
- Herman W. Paterson Cup (USHL - MVP) (1947)
- Lester Patrick Trophy (1977)
- Hobey Baker Legends of College Hockey Award (1984)

== Career statistics ==
			Regular season					Playoffs
Season	Team	League	GP	G	A	Pts	PIM	GP	G	A	Pts	PIM
1931–32	Regina Pats	SJHL	3	1	0	1	0	2	1	1	2	0
1932–33	Regina Pats	SJHL	3	0	0	0	7	2	0	0	0	10
1933–34	Regina Pats	SJHL	2	4	2	6	0	—	—	—	—	—
1934–35	Regina Victorias	SSHL	22	9	6	15	15	6	2	1	3	2
1935–36	New York Rovers	EAHL	32	15	23	38	18	7	1	2	3	0
1936–37	Syracuse Stars	IAHL	43	14	21	35	8	8	4	6	10	6
1937–38	Syracuse Stars	IAHL	35	7	31	38	10	5	3	1	4	0
1937–38	Toronto Maple Leafs	NHL	9	0	0	0	0	3	0	0	0	0
1938–39	Syracuse Stars	IAHL	50	27	27	54	10	3	1	1	2	0
1938–39	Toronto Maple Leafs	NHL	3	0	1	1	0	—	—	—	—	—
1939–40	New York Americans	NHL	47	16	20	36	12	3	0	0	0	0
1940–41	New York Americans	NHL	48	10	14	24	6	—	—	—	—	—
1941–42	Brooklyn Americans	NHL	45	6	22	28	15	—	—	—	—	—
1942–43	Regina Army Caps	SSHL	24	29	32	61	36	5	5	12	17	4
1943–44	Detroit Red Wings	NHL	28	12	22	34	4	5	0	2	2	0
1944–45	Detroit Red Wings	NHL	50	15	24	39	31	14	4	2	6	2
1945–46	Detroit Red Wings	NHL	40	8	18	26	4	5	0	2	2	0
1946–47	Buffalo Bisons	AHL	19	10	8	18	4	—	—	—	—	—
1946–47	Dallas Texans	USHL	42	15	31	46	10	6	0	3	3	0
NHL totals			270	67	121	188	72	30	4	6	10	2

== Head coaching record ==
=== College ===
Record table
Season	Team	Overall	Conference	Standing	Postseason
Denver Pioneers (WIHL) (1956–1958)
1956-57	Denver	12-14-2	6-11-1	5th	
1957-58	Denver	24-10-2	12-10-0	t-1st	NCAA National Champion
Denver:		36-24-4	18-21-1		
Denver Pioneers Independent (1958–1959)
1958-59	Denver	22-5-1			
Denver:		22-5-1			
Denver Pioneers (WCHA) (1959–1977)
1959-60	Denver	27-4-3	17-4-1	1st	NCAA National Champion
1960-61	Denver	30-1-1	17-1-0	1st	NCAA National Champion
1961-62	Denver	17-11-2	11-7-0	3rd	WCHA third-place game (Loss)
1962-63	Denver	23-9-1	12-6-0	1st	NCAA Runner-Up
1963-64	Denver	20-7-4	7-2-1	2nd	NCAA Runner-Up
1964-65	Denver	18-8-2	4-7-1	6th	
1965-66	Denver	18-11-3	10-7-3	4th	NCAA Consolation Game (Win)
1966-67	Denver	22-8-0	11-5-0	2nd	WCHA Finals
1967-68	Denver	28-5-1	15-3-0	1st	NCAA National Champion
1968-69	Denver	26-6-0	14-6-0	2nd	NCAA National Champion
1969-70	Denver	21-10-1	13-8-1	t-2nd	WCHA Regional Finals
1970-71	Denver	25-10-1	15-7-0	2nd	NCAA Consolation Game (Win)
1971-72	Denver	27-11-0	19-9-0	1st	NCAA Consolation Game (Loss)
1972-73	Denver	29-9-1	20-8-0	1st	NCAA Runner-Up
1973-74	Denver	22-13-3	15-11-2	3rd	WCHA Finals
1974-75	Denver	12-23-1	9-22-1	9th	
1975-76	Denver	16-23-0	12-20-0	t-7th	WCHA first round
1976-77	Denver	21-17-2	16-14-2	4th	WCHA Semifinals
Denver:		402-186-26	237-147-12		
Total:		460-215-31			
National champion Postseason invitational champion Conference regular season champion Conference regular season and conference tournament champion Division regular season champion Division regular season and conference tournament champion Conference tournament champion

== See also ==
- List of college men's ice hockey coaches with 400 wins

Awards and achievements
Preceded by John MacInnes; Bill Selman	WCHA Coach of the Year; 1960–61; 1967–68	Succeeded by John MacInnes; John Matchefts
Preceded by Jack Riley	Spencer Penrose Award; 1960–61	Succeeded by Jack Kelley
Preceded by John Mariucci	Hobey Baker Legends of College Hockey Award; 1984	Succeeded by Herb Gallagher
