= University of Denver Arena =

Former sports venue in Denver, Colorado, United States

- Location within the United States Location within Colorado
- Interactive map of University of Denver Arena
- Location: University of Denver; Denver, Colorado, U.S.
- Coordinates: 39.6821°N 104.9616°W
- Elevation: 5,340 feet (1,630 m) AMSL
- Owner: University of Denver
- Operator: University of Denver
- Capacity: 5,200

Construction
- Built: 1948; 78 years ago
- Renovated: 1972–73, 1990s
- Demolished: 1997; 29 years ago

University of Denver Arena was a 5,200-seat multi-purpose arena in the western United States, located on the campus pf the University of Denver in Denver, Colorado. It was home to the Denver Pioneers ice hockey team, and also hosted several Frozen Fours. It was razed 29 years ago in 1997 to make room for the $75 million Magness Arena, part of the Ritchie Center for Sports and Wellness, which opened in 1999.

The structure was originally a U.S. Navy drill hall in northern Idaho, built in the early 1940s at Farragut Naval Training Station at Lake Pend Oreille. It was donated after World War II and reassembled on the DU campus in 1948–49 to house the new ice hockey program and served for nearly half a century.

The arena was refurbished in 1972–73 when the roof needed repairs, and 14 seven-ton steel trusses were added to shore up the roof. Additional patchwork renovations were added in the 1990s, prior to its razing in 1997. The best known features of the arena were the steep bleacher balcony at the south end, and the 1970s rainbow painted on the north end wall. Famous hockey games held there include the NCAA finals in 1961, 1964, and 1976.

Preceded by Boston Arena; Boston	Host of the Frozen Four; 1961	Succeeded by Utica Memorial Auditorium; Utica, New York
Preceded by McHugh Forum; Chestnut Hill, Massachusetts	Host of the Frozen Four; 1964	Succeeded by Meehan Auditorium; Providence, Rhode Island
Preceded by St. Louis Arena; St. Louis, Missouri	Host of the Frozen Four; 1976	Succeeded by Olympia Stadium; Detroit, Michigan
