= 1959–60 Denver Pioneers men's ice hockey season =

Collegiate team season

National champion WCHA, champion WCHA Tournament, co-champion NCAA Tournament, champion
- Conference: 1st WCHA
- Home ice: DU Arena

Record
- Overall: 27–4–3
- Conference: 17–4–1
- Home: 15–2–2
- Road: 9–2–1
- Neutral: 3–0–0

Coaches and captains
- Head coach: Murray Armstrong
- Captain: John MacMillan

The 1959–60 Denver Pioneers men's ice hockey team represented University of Denver in college ice hockey. In its 4th year under head coach Murray Armstrong the team compiled a 27–4–3 record and reached the NCAA tournament for the second time. The Pioneers defeated Michigan Tech 5–3 in the championship game at the Boston Arena in Boston, Massachusetts. Denver set a record for the most wins by a team in one season, breaking the previous high of 25 set by Colorado College in 1956–57.

== Season ==
After Denver was left out of the 1959 NCAA Tournament despite having the best record of any NCAA team at 22-5-1, the Pioneers knew they had to make changes. First, the argument between Denver and Minnesota over recruiting practices (teenage Americans vs. overage Canadians) was not settled but was put to the side. As part of a compromise between the two Minnesota would agree to rejoin with the 4 former WIHL schools so long as they did not have to schedule Denver during the season. The deal was eventually struck where they would play the Pioneers during the 1959–60 season but were not required to afterwards (Minnesota would not play Denver outside of playoff meetings until 1972). That settlement allowed all seven schools to rejoin in the new WCHA which improved upon the previous conference principally by introducing the first official conference tournament in college hockey history. The second improvement came from counting all league games equally in the standings; rather than have a total of four points available between each pair of teams. The WCHA sorted their unbalanced schedule based on winning percentage.

Being in a conference once more also settled the second problem Denver had faced the year before; playing away games. Denver had only once left Colorado the year before and lost both games on the road. For 1959–60 they began the season with a compressed road trip where they played six games over a nine-day period. The trip started out well with Denver tying Minnesota 4–4 in the team's only overtime game all season before winning the following night. Two days later they were hosted by Michigan Tech and dropped both games to a very strong team. With no time to lick their wounds the Pioneers got one day off to travel to North Dakota and take on the defending national champion Fighting Sioux. The Pioneers redeemed themselves by winning both games comfortably and pulling back above .500.

After a 9-day break Denver opened its home schedule and thoroughly dominated the previous year's runner-up Michigan State by a combined score of 21-1. Those two games could have set the tone for the rest of Denver's season but the very next week they invited Michigan Tech to Denver and after winning the first game easily they lost their third game of the year to the Huskies and slipped to 6–3–1 in the WCHA. Similar to their last series against MTU, Denver got one day off before hosting Minnesota and avenged their loss with two 5-goal wins over the Golden Gophers. After winning two games against a visiting senior team Denver ended the first half of their conference schedule by splitting a pair of games against North Dakota. Denver found themselves sitting atop the WCHA at the end of January with a 9-4-1 record and were in prime position to earn the top seed in the WCHA tournament.

Denver began February playing a series of games against several national teams who were preparing to play in the Olympics at the end of the month along with Colorado College. After starting with a non-conference win over CC Denver defeated the eventual gold medalist US National Team and then tied them the following day. Two days later they tied the powerhouse Soviet National Team before defeating both West Germany and Sweden.

Once the Olympics began Denver returned to its conference schedule, winning both games of a home-and-home against Colorado College before hitting the road for a second time. On this trip they ended up playing two series in five days against Michigan and Michigan State and won all four games. After returning home and winning a second series against the CC Tigers Denver ended with a 23-4-3 record and won the inaugural WCHA championship.

Denver received the top seed in the WCHA Tournament which, rather than acting as a traditional tournament, had two 2-game series played between the top four teams to determine the two WCHA co-champions. The two series were total goal affairs rather than being best-of contests so when Denver opened against Colorado College with a 9–2 victory they would have to lose the succeeding game by 8 goals to miss out on the NCAA tournament. Unsurprisingly it was a much more defensive effort from the regular season champions and the Pioneers scored only three times on the night but was still able win the game and were joined by Michigan Tech as the inaugural WCHA Tournament co-champions.

As the better of the two teams Denver was given the top western seed in the NCAA tournament and opened against Boston University who were playing in their home building. Despite the mostly partisan crowd rooting them on, BU was unable to overcome the best offense in the nation and surrendered six goals to Denver who advanced to their second championship game. Denver was met in the final by their nemesis Michigan Tech and began the game at a conservative pace. Denver scored the first goal of the game just after the 10-minute mark and took another 22 minutes before the got their second. With the Pioneers holding a 2-0 advantage the Huskies came to life at the end of the second and scored three times in under five minutes to take their first lead of the game. After George Konik tied the game two and a half minutes into the third Denver was able to quell the MTU offense for the remainder of the period, holding the Huskies to only six shots. The Pioneers continued firing the puck at George Cuculick and with just over a minutes to go in regulation team captain John MacMillan scored the winning goal in his final college game. Just for good measure he added an empty-net goal 50 seconds later that sealed the game for Denver and sent the Pioneers to the top of the podium for the second time.

Because the entire tournament had been played fairly evenly the voters could not decide on one person to win the MOP so for the first (and only as of 2018) time the award was split, going to three players but none of whom belonged to the national champion. Instead Denver had to settle for only two of the six spots on the All-Tournament first team in the form of Marty Howe and George Konik while John MacMillan and goaltender George Kirkwood were placed on the second team.

Howe, Konik and Bill Masterton were named to the AHCA All-American West Team while Kirkwood, Howe and Masterton received All-WCHA First Team nods. While Konik and MacMillan found themselves on the WCHA second team Kirkwood was named as the top sophomore in the WCHA (along with MTU's Lou Angotti) and set the record for more wins a season by a goaltender with 27.

== Standings ==
1959–60 Western Collegiate Hockey Association standings
	Conference							Overall					
	GP	W	L	T	PCT	GF	GA	GP	W	L	T	GF	GA
Denver†*	22	17	4	1	.795	128	55	34	27	4	3	204	88
Michigan Tech*	22	15	6	1	.705	107	72	32	21	10	1	152	107
North Dakota	22	14	7	1	.659	93	80	32	19	11	2	157	115
Colorado College	20	8	12	0	.400	72	101	26	8	17	1	87	146
Michigan	18	7	11	0	.389	63	71	24	12	12	0	97	81
Minnesota	24	8	15	1	.354	102	109	27	9	16	2	111	121
Michigan State	24	4	18	2	.208	54	130	24	4	18	2	54	130
Championship: Michigan Tech, Denver † indicates conference regular season champion * indicates conference tournament champion

== Schedule ==
Date	Opponent	Site	Result	Record
Exhibition
November 28	vs. DU Hilltoppers*	DU Arena • Denver, Colorado	W 14–6	
Regular Season
December 4	at Minnesota	Williams Arena • Minneapolis, Minnesota	T 4–4 ^{OT}	0–0–1 (0–0–1)
December 5	at Minnesota	Williams Arena • Minneapolis, Minnesota	W 5–4	1–0–1 (1–0–1)
December 8	at Michigan Tech	Dee Stadium • Houghton, Michigan	L 3–6	1–1–1 (1–1–1)
December 9	at Michigan Tech	Dee Stadium • Houghton, Michigan	L 3–5	1–2–1 (1–2–1)
December 11	at North Dakota	Winter Sports Building • Grand Forks, North Dakota	W 6–3	2–2–1 (2–2–1)
December 12	at North Dakota	Winter Sports Building • Grand Forks, North Dakota	W 5–2	3–2–1 (3–2–1)
December 21	vs. Michigan State	DU Arena • Denver, Colorado	W 10–1	4–2–1 (4–2–1)
December 22	vs. Michigan State	DU Arena • Denver, Colorado	W 11–0	5–2–1 (5–2–1)
December 29	vs. Michigan Tech	DU Arena • Denver, Colorado	W 9–4	6–2–1 (6–2–1)
December 30	vs. Michigan Tech	DU Arena • Denver, Colorado	L 3–5	6–3–1 (6–3–1)
January 1	vs. Minnesota	DU Arena • Denver, Colorado	W 6–1	7–3–1 (7–3–1)
January 2	vs. Minnesota	DU Arena • Denver, Colorado	W 7–2	8–3–1 (8–3–1)
January 8	vs. Warroad Lakers*	DU Arena • Denver, Colorado	W 9–1	9–3–1 (8–3–1)
January 9	vs. Warroad Lakers*	DU Arena • Denver, Colorado	W 9–2	10–3–1 (8–3–1)
January 26	vs. North Dakota	DU Arena • Denver, Colorado	L 5–6	10–4–1 (8–4–1)
January 27	vs. North Dakota	DU Arena • Denver, Colorado	W 8–1	11–4–1 (9–4–1)
February 2	vs. Colorado College*	DU Arena • Denver, Colorado	W 10–4	12–4–1 (9–4–1)
February 5	vs. US National Team*	DU Arena • Denver, Colorado	W 7–5	13–4–1 (9–4–1)
February 6	vs. US National Team*	DU Arena • Denver, Colorado	T 5–5	13–4–2 (9–4–1)
February 8	vs. Soviet National Team*	DU Arena • Denver, Colorado	T 2–2	13–4–3 (9–4–1)
February 13	vs. West German National Team*	Broadmoor World Arena • Colorado Springs, Colorado	W 6–1	14–4–3 (9–4–1)
February 15	vs. Swedish National Team*	DU Arena • Denver, Colorado	W 5–3	15–4–3 (10–4–1)
February 19	vs. Colorado College	DU Arena • Denver, Colorado	W 6–2	16–4–3 (10–4–1)
February 20	at Colorado College	Broadmoor World Arena • Colorado Springs, Colorado	W 4–1	17–4–3 (11–4–1)
February 26	at Michigan State	Demonstration Hall • East Lansing, Michigan	W 5–0	18–4–3 (12–4–1)
February 27	at Michigan State	Demonstration Hall • East Lansing, Michigan	W 5–1	19–4–3 (13–4–1)
February 29	at Michigan	Weinberg Coliseum • Ann Arbor, Michigan	W 8–1	20–4–3 (14–4–1)
March 1	at Michigan	Weinberg Coliseum • Ann Arbor, Michigan	W 4–2	21–4–3 (15–4–1)
March 4	vs. Colorado College	DU Arena • Denver, Colorado	W 5–2	22–4–3 (16–4–1)
March 5	at Colorado College	Broadmoor World Arena • Colorado Springs, Colorado	W 6–2	23–4–3 (17–4–1)
WCHA Tournament
March 11	vs. Colorado College*	DU Arena • Denver, Colorado (WCHA Final Game 1)	W 9–2	24–4–3 (17–4–1)
March 12	vs. Colorado College*	DU Arena • Denver, Colorado (WCHA Final Game 2)	W 3–1	25–4–3 (17–4–1)
NCAA Tournament
March 18	vs. Boston University*	Boston Arena • Boston, Massachusetts (National Semifinal)	W 6–4	26–4–3 (17–4–1)
March 19	vs. Michigan Tech*	Boston Arena • Boston, Massachusetts (National championship)	W 5–3	27–4–3 (17–4–1)
*Non-conference game. Source:

== Roster and scoring statistics ==
No.	Name	Year	Position	Hometown	S/P/C	Games	Goals	Assists	Points	PIM
1	George Kirkwood	Sophomore	G	Edmonton, AB	(Alberta)	34	–	–	–	–
2	George Konik	Junior	D	Flin Flon, MB	(Manitoba)	34	13	28	41	50
4	Norb Kemp	Junior	G	Regina, SK	(Saskatchewan)	0	0	0	0	0
5	Ray Hamlin	Senior	D	Lloydminster, AB	(Alberta)	34	2	10	12	12
5	Marty Howe	Junior	D	Regina, SK	(Saskatchewan)	32	13	21	34	24
6	Grant Munro	Junior	D	Regina, SK	(Saskatchewan)	34	5	13	18	28
7	Terry Lomnes	Junior	LW	Camrose, AB	(Alberta)	17	0	2	2	10
8	Ken Williamson	Sophomore	C	Winnipeg, MB	(Manitoba)	31	10	15	25	10
9	Bill Masterton	Junior	C	Winnipeg, MB	(Manitoba)	34	21	46	67	2
10	Con Collie	Senior	RW	Regina, SK	(Saskatchewan)	34	20	23	43	30
11	Jerry Walker	Junior	F	Regina, SK	(Saskatchewan)	34	31	19	50	20
12	Paul Josephson	Junior	C	Saskatoon, SK	(Saskatchewan)	34	19	23	42	2
13	Trent Beatty	Sophomore	RW	Kerrobert, SK	(Saskatchewan)	12	1	4	5	2
14	Murray MacDonald	Sophomore	LW	Regina, SK	(Saskatchewan)	32	18	15	34	28
15	Max Geisthardt	Junior	LW	Regina, SK	(Saskatchewan)	31	10	10	20	8
16	Bruce Walker	Senior	RW	Meadow Lake, SK	(Saskatchewan)	34	10	12	22	8
17	John MacMillan	Senior	RW	Lethbridge, AB	(Alberta)	34	30	25	55	34
18	Al Barnhill	Senior	D	Wetaskiwin, AB	(Alberta)	2	1	0	1	0
20	Paul DiNapoli	Sophomore	G	Belmont, MA	(Massachusetts)	0	0	0	0	0
	Dick Jacob	Sophomore	F	Crescent City, CA	(California)	0	0	0	0	0
Total										

- Dick Jabob was a member of the team but did not participate in any of their games and was not awarded a jersey number.

== Goaltending Statistics ==
No.	Name	Games	Minutes	Wins	Losses	Ties	Goals against	Saves	Shut outs	SV %	GAA
1	George Kirkwood	34	–	27	4	3	86	–	2	.900	2.50
20	Paul DiNapoli	–	–	–	–	–	–	–	–	–	–
Total		34	–	27	4	3	–	–	2	–	–

== 1960 championship game ==
=== W1 Denver vs. W2 Michigan Tech ===
March 19	Denver	5 – 3	Michigan Tech	Boston Arena	Recap

Scoring summary
Period	Team	Goal	Assist(s)	Time	Score
1st	DEN	Jerry Walker	Masterton and Collie	10:51	1–0 DEN
2nd	DEN	Grant Munro	Geisthardt	32:42	2–0 DEN
2nd	MTU	Paul Coppo – PP	Kosiancic	34:17	2–1 DEN
2nd	MTU	Jerry Sullivan	Pascht and Angotti	36:27	2–2
2nd	MTU	Gerald Fabbro	Kosiancic and Angotti	39:02	3–2 MTU
3rd	DEN	George Konik	unassisted	42:30	3–3
3rd	DEN	John MacMillan – GW	Howe	58:57	4–3 DEN
3rd	DEN	John MacMillan – EN	Walker	59:48	5–3 DEN

Shots by period
Team	1	2	3	T
Michigan Tech	6	16	6	28
Denver	7	9	12	28

Goaltenders
Team	Name	Saves	Goals against	Time on ice
MTU	George Cuculick	23	4	
DEN	George Kirkwood	25	3	

== Notes ==
After graduating in 1960, John MacMillan was signed by the Toronto Maple Leafs and became the first Denver alumnus to play in the NHL. Though his career was short he would end up winning two Stanley cups. several years after MacMillan's retirement George Konik and Bill Masterton would make their NHL debuts in the 1967–68 season. While Konik would play 51 games for Pittsburgh before returning to the minors, Masterton became the only player in the history of professional North American sports to die as a direct result of injuries sustained in a game.
