= Coppa (surname) =

Coppa is a surname. Notable people with the name include:

- Christine Coppa, American writer
- Elpidio Coppa (1914 — 1978), an Italian professional football player
- Ezio Coppa (1898 -1969), Italian politician
- Francesca Coppa (born 1970), American scholar
- Frank Coppa (1941 – 2023), American gangster in the Bonanno crime family
- Frank J. Coppa ( 1937 – J2021), American historian, author, and educator
- Giovanni Coppa (1925–2016), Italian cardinal
- Luigi Coppa (born 1950), Italian gymnast
- Selena Coppa, ex-military intelligence Sergeant in the United States Army.
- Stefano Coppa, Italian engraver, active in Rome c. 1776

== See also ==
- Coppa (disambiguation)
- Coppi
- Coppo
