= Tom Wahman =

American ice hockey player (1938–2016)

- Born: February 1, 1938 Saint Paul, Minnesota, USA
- Died: February 26, 2016 (aged 78) New York City, New York, USA
- Height: 6 ft 0 in (183 cm)
- Weight: 150 lb (68 kg; 10 st 10 lb)
- Position: Goaltender
- Played for: Dartmouth
- Playing career: 1957–1960

Thomas Walter Wahman (February 1, 1938 – February 26, 2016) was an American ice hockey goaltender who was an All-American for Dartmouth. He later became a prominent figure in the Civil rights movement, participating in the Freedom Summer project in 1964 and being a chief strategist behind the renewal of the Voting Rights Act in 1982.

== Career ==
Wahman graduated from Johnson Senior High School in 1956 and began attending Dartmouth College the following fall. After a year he joined the varsity hockey team and served as a backup for much of his first two seasons before getting his chance as the starter in 1959. Wahman performed tremendously in his senior season, leading Dartmouth to a 14–5–1 record, their best mark in over a decade, and a #3 ranking among eastern teams. In the Indians' final game they played Boston University in a play-in game to determine which would receive a bid to the 1960 NCAA Tournament but Dartmouth's offense was stifled and the team lost 1–4. Wahman and teammate Rusty Ingersoll were both named as AHCA All-Americans, the last Indians so honored for 20 years.

After graduating, Wahman enrolled in the Union Theological Seminary, working in some of the poorest neighborhoods in Manhattan. In 1963 Wahman participated in a sit-in of the South African consulate at the United Nations to protest and publicize the Sharpeville massacre. He was arrested along with eight others for the demonstration.

The following spring he joined the Freedom Summer project and travelled to Mississippi, conducting orientation and training for new volunteers and teachers. He also helped organized the Mississippi Freedom Democratic Party and challenge the state Democratic Party's delegation to the 1964 DNC. Wahman later wrote of his experience in Mississippi:

"Living in Mississippi was an eye opener, to say the very least. By the time the summer was over, I had encountered institutional racism at its worst (at least in America), systematic repression of African Americans, and the most closed society in America. I had also witnessed, and was inspired by, great courage, respectful solidarity, and an abiding movement for social justice largely led by African American ex-sharecroppers who had been thrown off the land. The mass media followed the volunteers into Mississippi and many in America were shocked by what they read and saw. The volunteers came out of Mississippi with deeper insights into the pervasiveness of institutional racism and personal commitments to help dismantle it, not only in Mississippi, but in their home communities as well."

That fall Wahman returned to New York to accept a position as Coordinator of Religious and Civil Rights Activities at colleges in The Bronx. He organized several bus trips for students and professors to Washington D.C. for protests against the Vietnam War and for the Voting Rights Act of 1965. The following year he became a program officer for New York Foundation where he directed grants to organizations in the south to fight the resistance to the Voting Rights Act.

In 1968 Wahman became an executive of the Rockefeller Brothers Fund on the condition that it would create a focused 'Southern Program' to aid the civil rights movement. After two years and the threat of his resignation, Wahman was able to establish the Southern Branch and served as its director for the next thirteen years. Aside from the monetary contributions, the Rockefeller name carried a great deal of weight in the philanthropic community and induced several other organizations to contribute to the Civil Right Movement.

Wahman was also one of the chief strategists of the 1982 reauthorization of the Voting Rights Act which, by some estimation, was even more contentions than the original passage of the bill. This was mainly because the drive and attention from the public had waned over the previous 17 years and most of the focus on the bill came from quarters of the country that wanted the Voting Rights Act to be scrapped entirely.

The Rockefeller Brothers Fund eventually phased out their equal-rights programs in the mid-1980's but Wahman continued to work in the same capacity in other organizations like the MacArthur Foundation and the Charles Stuart Mott Foundation over the succeeding 20 years. in 2007 he received the Martin Luther King Jr. Social Justice award from his alma mater for a lifetime of work in civil rights.

== Personal ==
Tom Wahman suffered a traumatic brain injury late in life and struggled with progressive dementia until 2016 when he died of pneumonia at St. Luke's Hospital. He was survived by his wife Susan and their daughters, Gwendolyn and Jessica.

== Awards and honors ==
Award	Year
AHCA East All-American	1959–60
