= Jim Cross (ice hockey coach) =

American ice hockey player and coach (1933–2020)

Biographical details
- Born: January 29, 1933; Weymouth, Massachusetts, U.S.
- Died: May 2, 2020 (aged 87); Savannah, Georgia, U.S.
- Education: Boston University

Playing career
- 1958–1960: Boston University
- Position: Forward

Coaching career (HC unless noted)
- 1965–1984: Vermont

Head coaching record
- Overall: 280–251–9 (.527)

Accomplishments and honors

Championships
- 1970 ECAC II tournament champion 1973 ECAC II Champion; 1973 ECAC II tournament champion 1974 ECAC II Champion; 1974 ECAC II tournament champion 1980 ECAC Hockey West Division Champion

Awards
- 1973 Edward Jeremiah Award; 1975 Harry Cleverly Alumni Award; 1996 University of Vermont Athletic Hall of Fame; 2001 AHCA John MacInnes Award; 2019 Hobey Baker Legends of College Hockey Award; 2020 Vermont Sports Hall of Fame

James M. Cross (January 29, 1933 – May 2, 2020) was an American ice hockey player and coach who led the Vermont Catamounts of the University of Vermont for nineteen seasons.

== Playing career ==
Cross graduated from Boston University in 1960, having played ice hockey for the Terriers for two seasons. In his senior year, he helped the team record a third-place finish at the 1960 NCAA men's ice hockey tournament. While at BU, Cross played collegiate summer baseball with the Dennis Clippers of the Cape Cod Baseball League.

== Coaching career ==
After graduating from BU, Cross became the director of physical education at Lyman C. Hunt School, a position he held for four years before accepting the head coaching position at nearby Vermont. Cross joined the program in only its third year of existence and took a few years to get the team going in the right direction. In 1970 Cross won his first ECAC 2 tournament title but did not participate in the national tournament because the Division II championship did not start until 1978. After two more good seasons Cross's teams won back-to-back ECAC II titles, and went undefeated in conference play in 1973, earning Cross the Edward Jeremiah Award that year.

In 1974 Vermont promoted its program to Division I and was immediately accepted into ECAC Hockey. The Catamounts exceeded general expectation by finishing the season with a 24–12 record and in third place in the conference. The team also finished third in the ECAC tournament. After this promising start, Vermont declined to middling records for four years before winning an ECAC West divisional title in 1980. The 1979–80 season was Cross's last winning season, and over his final four years Vermont finished no higher than 12th in the conference. In 1984 Cross resigned, saying, "I want to step aside before I get to the burnout stage."

Cross remained with the University of Vermont until his retirement in 1994 and two years later was inducted into the University of Vermont Athletic Hall of Fame. He was honored in 2001 with the American Hockey Coaches Association's John MacInnes Award, which "recognizes those people who have shown a great concern for amateur hockey and youth programs." In 2019, Cross received the prestigious Hobey Baker Legends of College Hockey Award, and in 2020, he was inducted into the Vermont Sports Hall of Fame.

== Later life and death ==
In his later years, Cross lived in Savannah, Georgia, and died there of complications from COVID-19 on May 2, 2020, at age 87, during the COVID-19 pandemic in Georgia (U.S. state).

== College head coaching record ==
Record table
Season	Team	Overall	Conference	Standing	Postseason
Vermont Catamounts (ECAC 2) (1965–1974)
1965–66	Vermont	8–11–0	8–7–0	7th	
1966–67	Vermont	5–14–0	4–9–0	12th	
1967–68	Vermont	12–11–0	12–6–0	T–4th	
1968–69	Vermont	13–12–0	11–8–0	10th	
1969–70	Vermont	16–8–0	14–4–0	2nd	ECAC II Champion
1970–71	Vermont	17–9–0	14–4–0	2nd	ECAC II Runner-Up
1971–72	Vermont	17–7–2	13–3–1	T–2nd	ECAC II Semifinals
1972–73	Vermont	24–7–0	19–0–0	1st	ECAC II Champion
1973–74	Vermont	28–5–0	18–1–0	1st	ECAC II Champion
Vermont:		140–84–2	113–42–1		
Vermont Catamounts (ECAC Hockey) (1974–1984)
1974–75	Vermont	24–12–0	12–5–0	3rd	ECAC third-place game (win)
1975–76	Vermont	15–16–1	9–13–0	11th	
1976–77	Vermont	15–15–0	10–13–0	11th	
1977–78	Vermont	15–16–0	9–14–0	T–11th	
1978–79	Vermont	12–18–0	11–10–0	8th	ECAC Quarterfinals
1979–80	Vermont	23–12–0	16–7–0	4th	ECAC Quarterfinals
1980–81	Vermont	9–23–2	4–16–2	16th	
1981–82	Vermont	11–16–2	8–12–2	12th	
1982–83	Vermont	6–21–1	3–16–1	15th	
1983–84	Vermont	10–18–1	6–13–1	14th	
Vermont:		140–167–7	88–119–6		
Total:		280–251–9			
National champion Postseason invitational champion Conference regular season champion Conference regular season and conference tournament champion Division regular season champion Division regular season and conference tournament champion Conference tournament champion

Awards and achievements
Preceded by Jack Canniff	Edward Jeremiah Award; 1972–73	Succeeded by Barry Urbanski
Preceded by Red Berenson	Hobey Baker Legends of College Hockey Award; 2019	Succeeded by Rick Comley
