= 1959–60 NCAA men's ice hockey season =

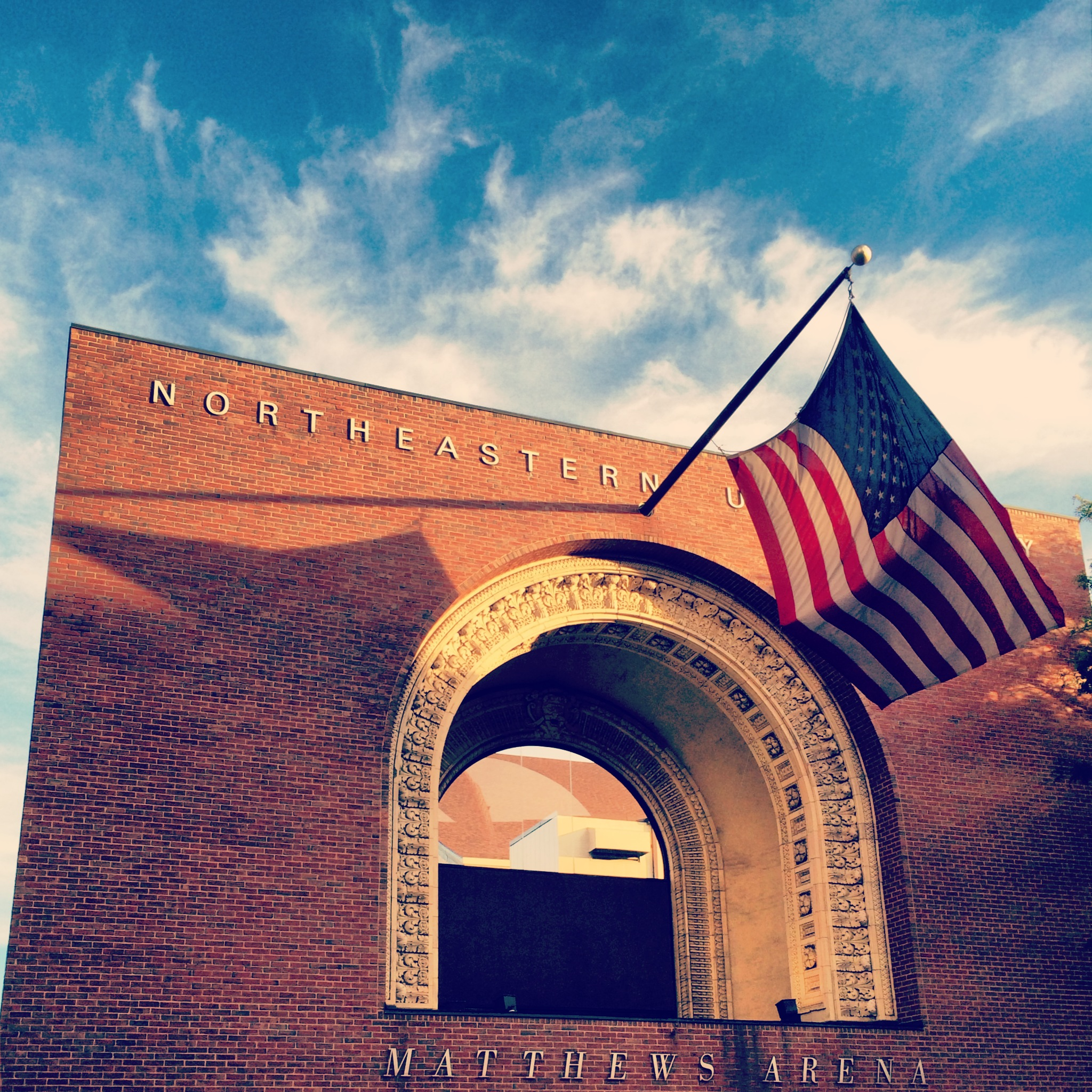
- The Matthews Arena served as the host for the 1960 Tournament
- Duration: November 1959– March 19, 1960
- NCAA tournament: 1960
- National championship: Boston Arena; Boston, Massachusetts
- NCAA champion: Denver

The 1959–60 NCAA men's ice hockey season began in November 1959 and concluded with the 1960 NCAA Men's Ice Hockey Tournament's championship game on March 19, 1960 at the Boston Arena in Boston, Massachusetts. This was the 13th season in which an NCAA ice hockey championship was held and is the 66th year overall where an NCAA school fielded a team.

This was the first season of play for the WCHA. All seven universities were the same from the previous MCHL/WIHL conference that dissolved after the 1957–58 season. Michigan, Michigan State and Minnesota would continue with both the Big Ten and the WCHA concurrently until 1981 when Michigan and Michigan State left the WCHA and no longer played sufficient games against the other Big Ten schools to warrant the continuation of the Big Ten ice hockey conference.

The creation of the WCHA also brought the first formalized conference tournament in NCAA hockey history with the winner(s) receiving the first automatic bids into the postseason championship.

== Regular season ==
=== Season tournaments ===
Tournament	Dates	Teams	Champion
Boston Arena Christmas Tournament	December 26–30	7	Toronto
Bowdoin Christmas Tournament	December 21–23	8	Brown
Rensselaer Holiday Tournament	December 30–January 2	4	North Dakota
Beanpot	February 8, 15	4	Harvard

=== Standings ===
1959–60 Big Ten standings
	Conference							Overall					
	GP	W	L	T	PTS	GF	GA	GP	W	L	T	GF	GA
Minnesota†	8	5	3	0	10	37	23	27	9	16	2	111	121
Michigan	8	4	4	0	8	29	26	24	12	12	0	97	81
Michigan State	8	3	5	0	6	23	39	24	4	18	2	54	130
† indicates conference regular season champion

1959–60 NCAA Independent ice hockey standings
	Intercollegiate							Overall					
	GP	W	L	T	Pct.	GF	GA	GP	W	L	T	GF	GA
Amherst	–	–	–	–	–	–	–	17	9	8	0	–	–
American International	–	–	–	–	–	–	–	15	6	9	0	–	–
Army	20	14	5	1	.725	100	55	22	16	5	1	119	62
Boston College	–	–	–	–	–	–	–	24	15	8	1	121	76
Boston University	27	19	8	0	.704	118	84	27	19	8	0	118	84
Bowdoin	–	–	–	–	–	–	–	22	11	11	0	–	–
Brown	–	–	–	–	–	–	–	26	13	13	0	76	94
Colby	–	–	–	–	–	–	–	23	16	7	0	–	–
Colgate	–	–	–	–	–	–	–	15	5	10	0	40	100
Cornell	–	–	–	–	–	–	–	21	2	19	0	33	158
Dartmouth	–	–	–	–	–	–	–	20	14	5	1	96	48
Hamilton	–	–	–	–	–	–	–	18	13	5	0	–	–
Harvard	–	–	–	–	–	–	–	24	16	7	1	110	68
Massachusetts	–	–	–	–	–	–	–	17	5	12	0	48	82
Merrimack	–	–	–	–	–	–	–	9	3	6	0	38	45
Middlebury	–	–	–	–	–	–	–	22	15	7	0	–	–
MIT	–	–	–	–	–	–	–	11	3	8	0	–	–
New Hampshire	–	–	–	–	–	–	–	19	11	8	0	79	66
Northeastern	–	–	–	–	–	–	–	24	8	16	0	96	142
Norwich	–	–	–	–	–	–	–	18	6	12	0	–	–
Princeton	–	–	–	–	–	–	–	23	12	11	0	109	75
Providence	–	–	–	–	–	–	–	20	11	9	0	110	69
St. Olaf	–	–	–	–	–	–	–	12	2	9	1	–	–
Tufts	–	–	–	–	–	–	–	17	2	15	0	–	–
Williams	–	–	–	–	–	–	–	19	5	14	0	–	–
Yale	–	–	–	–	–	–	–	25	10	15	0	105	114

1959–60 Minnesota Intercollegiate Athletic Conference ice hockey standings
	Conference							Overall					
	GP	W	L	T	PTS	GF	GA	GP	W	L	T	GF	GA
Minnesota–Duluth †	8	8	0	0	1.000	–	–	20	15	5	0	–	–
Augsburg	8	6	2	0	.750	–	–	12	10	2	0	–	–
St. Thomas	7	5	2	0	.714	–	–	10	7	3	0	–	–
Macalester	8	5	3	0	.625	–	–	–	–	–	–	–	–
Gustavus Adolphus	7	4	3	0	.571	–	–	12	4	7	1	–	–
Saint John's	8	4	4	0	.500	–	–	16	11	5	0	–	–
Hamline	8	2	6	0	.250	–	–	–	–	–	–	–	–
Saint Mary's	8	1	7	0	.125	–	–	12	2	10	0	–	–
Concordia	8	0	8	0	.000	–	–	9	0	9	0	–	–
† indicates conference champion

1959–60 Tri-State League standings
	Conference							Overall					
	GP	W	L	T	PTS	GF	GA	GP	W	L	T	GF	GA
St. Lawrence†	4	4	0	0	8	21	12	24	14	8	2	122	119
Rensselaer	4	2	2	0	4	17	19	22	15	7	0	109	71
Clarkson	4	0	4	0	0	14	21	20	7	13	0	80	102
† indicates conference regular season champion

1959–60 Western Collegiate Hockey Association standings
	Conference							Overall					
	GP	W	L	T	PCT	GF	GA	GP	W	L	T	GF	GA
Denver†*	22	17	4	1	.795	128	55	34	27	4	3	204	88
Michigan Tech*	22	15	6	1	.705	107	72	32	21	10	1	152	107
North Dakota	22	14	7	1	.659	93	80	32	19	11	2	157	115
Colorado College	20	8	12	0	.400	72	101	26	8	17	1	87	146
Michigan	18	7	11	0	.389	63	71	24	12	12	0	97	81
Minnesota	24	8	15	1	.354	102	109	27	9	16	2	111	121
Michigan State	24	4	18	2	.208	54	130	24	4	18	2	54	130
Championship: Michigan Tech, Denver † indicates conference regular season champion * indicates conference tournament champion

== 1960 NCAA Tournament ==
Semifinals; March 17–18
E1	St. Lawrence	3
W2	Michigan Tech	13
W1	Denver	6
E2	Boston University	4

National championship March 19
W2	Michigan Tech	3
W1	Denver	5
Third-place game
E1	St. Lawrence	6
E2	Boston University	7

Note: * denotes overtime period(s)

== Player stats ==
=== Scoring leaders ===
The following players led the league in points at the conclusion of the season.

GP = Games played; G = Goals; A = Assists; Pts = Points; PIM = Penalty minutes

Player	Class	Team	GP	G	A	Pts	PIM
Phil Latreille	Junior	Middlebury	22	77	19	96	-
Tim Norbeck	Senior	Hamilton	-	40	32	72	-
Terry Slater	Junior	St. Lawrence	24	34	38	72	4
Bill Masterton	Junior	Denver	34	21	46	67	2
Reg Morelli	Senior	North Dakota	31	34	31	65	12
Bob Marquis	Senior	Boston University	-	33	26	59	-
Paul Coppo	Senior	Michigan Tech	32	26	31	57	2
Art Chisholm	Junior	Northeastern	24	25	31	56	15
John MacMillan	Senior	Denver	34	30	25	55	34
John Kosiancic	Senior	Michigan Tech	32	24	31	55	30

=== Leading goaltenders ===
The following goaltenders led the league in goals against average at the end of the regular season while playing at least 33% of their team's total minutes.

GP = Games played; Min = Minutes played; W = Wins; L = Losses; OT = Overtime/shootout losses; GA = Goals against; SO = Shutouts; SV% = Save percentage; GAA = Goals against average

Player	Class	Team	GP	Min	W	L	OT	GA	SO	SV%	GAA
John Wilson	Sophomore	Northeastern	11	-	-	-	-	-	-	.846	1.73
George Kirkwood	Junior	Denver	34	-	27	4	3	-	2	.900	2.50
Ron Chisholm	Sophomore	Army	22	1328	16	5	1	62	2	.888	2.80
Jim MacLean	Sophomore	Rensselaer	14	-	-	-	-	-	-	.876	2.97
Rod Blackburn	Junior	New Hampshire	13	705	6	5	0	35	2	.900	2.98
Barry Urbanski	Junior	Boston University	17	-	12	5	0	-	-	.907	3.24
George Cuculick	Senior	Michigan Tech	30	-	-	-	-	-	-	.889	3.26
George Gratton	Junior	North Dakota	30	-	-	-	-	-	1	.873	3.33
Chuck Steinweg	Sophomore	Minnesota	19	-	-	-	-	-	-	.877	3.89
Charles Hamlin	Sophomore	Yale	-	-	-	-	-	-	-	-	3.90

== Awards ==
=== NCAA ===
Award		Recipient
Spencer Penrose Award		Jack Riley, Army
Most Outstanding Player in NCAA Tournament		Lou Angotti, Michigan Tech
Most Outstanding Player in NCAA Tournament		Bob Marquis, Boston University
Most Outstanding Player in NCAA Tournament		Barry Urbanski, Boston University
AHCA All-American Teams
East Team	Position	West Team
Tom Wahman, Dartmouth	G	George Cuculick, Michigan Tech
Red Martin, Boston College	D	Marty Howe, Denver
Rusty Ingersoll, Dartmouth	D	George Konik, Denver
Terry Slater, St. Lawrence	F	Paul Coppo, Michigan Tech
Phil Latreille, Middlebury	F	Reg Morelli, North Dakota
Art Chisholm, Northeastern	F	Bill Masterton, Denver

=== WCHA ===
Award		Recipient
Sophomore of the Year		George Kirkwood, Denver
Sophomore of the Year		Lou Angotti, Michigan Tech
Coach of the Year		John MacInnes, Michigan Tech
All-WCHA Teams
First Team	Position	Second Team
George Kirkwood, Denver	G	George Cuculick, Michigan Tech
Marty Howe, Denver	D	Guy LaFrance, North Dakota
Henry Akervall, Michigan Tech	D	George Konik, Denver
Reg Morelli, North Dakota	F	Gerald Fabbro, Michigan Tech
Bill Masterton, Denver	F	John MacMillan, Denver
John Kosiancic, Michigan Tech	F	Paul Coppo, Michigan Tech
