= Koppal (disambiguation) =

Koppal is a city in Karnataka, India.

Koppal may also refer to:

- Koppal (Karnataka Assembly constituency), Karnataka
- Koppal (Lok Sabha constituency), Karnataka
- Koppal (Rural), a village in Karnataka
- Koppal district, Karnataka
- K. G. Koppal, a locality in Chamarajapuram, Mysore, Karnataka

== See also ==
- Koppa (disambiguation)
