= Barry Urbanski =

American ice hockey player and coach

Biographical details
- Born: Danvers, Massachusetts, U.S.
- Education: Boston University

Playing career
- 1958–1961: Boston University
- Position: Goaltender

Coaching career (HC unless noted)
- 1964–1975: Salem State

Head coaching record
- Overall: 137–64–4 (.678)

Accomplishments and honors

Awards
- 1974 Edward Jeremiah Award; 1987 Salem State Athletic Hall of Fame

Barry Urbanski is an American retired ice hockey goaltender and coach who was one of three people awarded the NCAA Tournament MOP in 1960 and was named as the Division II National Coach of Year in 1974.

== Career ==
Urbanski began attending Boston University in the fall of 1957 and joined the varsity team the following year. He played only in relief as a sophomore, but in his junior season Urbanski made a name for himself in the Terrier net. In 17 games he went 12–5 with some of the best numbers in the nation, helping BU receive a tournament berth for the first time in seven years. The Terriers weren't able to outscore Denver in the semifinal and fell 4–6. In the consolation game, BU and St. Lawrence produced a wild affair with the Terriers managing to finish on top 7–6. Urbanski was named as the tournament's top goaltender and was one of three players to share the Tournament Most Outstanding Player, the only time in history that the award was split (as of 2020).

Urbanski served as the team's starter in his senior season but he could not recapture the magic of 1960 and the Terriers ended up with a losing season. After graduating, Urbanski remained at BU to earn a Master's degree and then joined the staff of State Teachers' College at Salem in 1964. While at Salem, Urbanski coached the ice hockey team for 11 years and never had a losing record. Under his stewardship, the Vikings became a power in ECAC 2, playing in three conference tournaments over a four-year span. Urbanski's best season behind the bench came in 1974 when the team finished with a 21–3 record, for which he received the Edward Jeremiah Award as the best coach in either Division II or III.

Urbanski retired as coach after the 1975 season and he was inducted into the Salem State Athletic Hall of Fame in 1987.

== Statistics ==
=== Regular season and playoffs ===
			Regular season									Playoffs
Season	Team	League	GP	W	L	T	MIN	GA	SO	GAA	SV%	GP	W	L	MIN	GA	SO	GAA	SV%
1958–59	Boston University	NCAA	—	—	—	—	—	—	—	—	—	—	—	—	—	—	—	—	—
1959–60	Boston University	NCAA	17	12	5	0	—	—	—	3.24	.907	—	—	—	—	—	—	—	—
1960–61	Boston University	NCAA	24	10	14	0	—	—	—	—	—	—	—	—	—	—	—	—	—
NCAA totals			41	22	19	0	2480	166	—	4.02	.895	—	—	—	—	—	—	—	—

== College head coaching record ==
Record table
Season	Team	Overall	Conference	Standing	Postseason
Salem State Vikings Independent (1964–1967)
1964–65	Salem State	10–1–0			
1965–66	Salem State	11–4–0			
1966–67	Salem State	11–4–1			
Salem State:		32–9–1			
Salem State Vikings (ECAC 2) (1967–1975)
1967–68	Salem State	11–7–0	6–5–0	14th	
1968–69	Salem State	12–5–1	10–5–1	5th	NAIA Third Place Game (Loss)
1969–70	Salem State	9–8–0	9–7–0	13th	
1970–71	Salem State	11–7–1	9–6–1	8th	
1971–72	Salem State	12–10–1	10–9–1	9th	ECAC 2 Quarterfinals
1972–73	Salem State	10–8–0	10–8–0	12th	
1973–74	Salem State	21–3–0	17–2–0	2nd	ECAC 2 Semifinals
1974–75	Salem State	19–7–0	15–6–0	5th	ECAC 2 Quarterfinals
Salem State:		105–55–3			
Total:		137–64–4			
National champion Postseason invitational champion Conference regular season champion Conference regular season and conference tournament champion Division regular season champion Division regular season and conference tournament champion Conference tournament champion

== Awards and honors ==
Award	Year
NCAA All-Tournament First Team	1960

Awards and achievements
Preceded by Reg Morelli	NCAA Tournament Most Outstanding Player; 1960 With Lou Angotti & Bob Marquis	Succeeded by Bill Masterton
Preceded by Jim Cross	Edward Jeremiah Award; 1974	Succeeded by Wendall Forbes
