= Coppo =

Coppo is both an Italian surname and a given name. Notable people with the name include:

- Paul Coppo (1938–2022), American ice hockey player
- Pietro Coppo (1469/70 – 1555/56), Italian geographer and cartographer
- Vincenzo Coppo (1905–?), Italian footballer
- Coppo di Marcovaldo (c. 1225 – c. 1276), Florentine painter

== See also ==
- Coppa (surname)
- Coppi
