= Marty Howe (ice hockey, born 1937) =

Canadian-born American ice hockey player (1937–2020)

- Born: January 15, 1937 Regina, Saskatchewan, CAN
- Died: August 15, 2020 (aged 83) Scottsdale, Arizona, USA
- Height: 6 ft 0 in (183 cm)
- Weight: 180 lb (82 kg; 12 st 12 lb)
- Position: Defenseman
- Played for: Denver; Pittsburgh Hornets; San Francisco Seals; Vancouver Canucks; Denver Invaders
- National team: United States
- Playing career: 1958–1967

Marty Howe was a Canadian-born, American ice hockey defenseman who was a two-time All-American for Denver and helped the team win consecutive national championships in the early 1960s.

== Career ==
Howe grew up in Regina and played for his home town junior team, the Regina Pats. He helped the club win consecutive Abbott Cups in 1955 and '56. After a bid for a third title in his final season went unfulfilled, Howe matriculated south and began attending the University of Denver in 1957. As most players did, Howe spent his first year on the freshman team as the NCAA only allowed three seasons of varsity play for student athletes. Howe watched the Pioneers win their first national championship in 1958 and knew he would have a chance to win one himself the following year.

That offseason, the WIHL dissolved as a result of a disagreement between schools over recruiting practices. Howe was one of many players used by teams like Denver or North Dakota who arrived from Canada as over-aged athletes (20 years old or more) and some in the conference, particularly Minnesota, took issue with that policy. As a result, Denver was an independent program for the 1959 season and produced a stellar record, going 22–5–1. Unfortunately, due to the ease of their schedule, Denver was left out of the NCAA tournament despite possessing the best record of any western team.

The result was a swift mending of fences and the WIHL reconstituted as the WCHA. Marty Howe, now a junior, was a star of the team, the conference and college ice hockey as a whole when he was named as the most outstanding defenseman for Denver in 1960, named to the inaugural All-WCHA First Team, and earned the first of his two All-American honors. Howe helped Denver finish atop their conference and then win both conference tournament games to earn the inaugural conference co-championship. The Pioneers received the top western seed for the NCAA tournament and won two fairly close contests to capture their second national title. Howe assisted on John MacMillan's game-winning goal with just under a minute to play and earned a spot on the All-Tournament First Team.

As an encore, Marty Howe helped Denver produce one of the most outstanding seasons in the history of college hockey. Denver became the first team to win 30 games in a season by going 30–1–1 and was recognized by having five players named to the six spots on both the All-WCHA First Team and the All-American West Team. Howe's named appeared on both lists for the second consecutive season and he aided the Pioneers in their defense of a conference championship. Howe's team returned to the NCAA tournament as the heavy favorite and Denver did not disappoint. Denver dropped Minnesota 6–1 in the semifinal and then produced the most lopsided victory in NCAA championship history with a 12–2 drubbing of St. Lawrence. Despite the huge number of goals scored, Howe did not record a point in the title game but he was named to the All-Tournament First Team nonetheless.

After graduating with a degree in accounting, Howe continued his playing career. He appeared briefly with the Pittsburgh Hornets before travelling west and spending several seasons in the Western Hockey League. Howe retired in 1964 but returned three years later as a member of the US National Team. He played at the 1967 Ice Hockey World Championships and finished tied for second in team scoring with 5 points in 7 games. The team finished 5th, a slight improvement over the previous year, but not good enough to keep Howe for another tournament.

Howe was inducted into the Denver Athletic Hall of Fame in 2001.

== Personal ==
Marty met his wife Diane while at Denver and the pair raised three daughters, Vanessa, Melissa and Diedre.

== Career statistics ==
			Regular Season					Playoffs
Season	Team	League	GP	G	A	Pts	PIM	GP	G	A	Pts	PIM
1954–55	Regina Pats	WCJHL	—	—	—	—	—	—	—	—	—	—
1955–56	Regina Pats	WCJHL	—	—	—	—	—	—	—	—	—	—
1956–57	Regina Pats	SJHL	51	5	19	24	89	—	—	—	—	—
1958–59	Denver	NCAA	—	—	—	—	—	—	—	—	—	—
1959–60	Denver	WCHA	—	13	21	34	—	—	—	—	—	—
1960–61	Denver	WCHA	—	—	—	—	—	—	—	—	—	—
1961–62	Pittsburgh Hornets	AHL	26	0	3	3	25	—	—	—	—	—
1961–62	San Francisco Seals	WHL	36	2	10	12	28	2	0	0	0	0
1962–63	Vancouver Canucks	WHL	68	3	12	15	78	7	1	2	3	6
1963–64	Denver Invaders	WHL	70	11	26	37	74	6	2	5	7	29
NCAA Totals			76	32	48	80	—	—	—	—	—	—

=== International ===
Year	Team	GP	G	A	Pts	PIM
1967	United States	7	3	2	5	36

== Awards and honors ==
Award	Year
All-WCHA First Team	1959–60
AHCA West All-American	1959–60
NCAA All-Tournament First Team	1960, 1961
All-WCHA First Team	1960–61
AHCA West All-American	1960–61
