= John Kosiancic =

Canadian ice hockey player

- Born: December 27, 1937 (age 88) Nelson, British Columbia, Canada
- Height: 5 ft 10 in (178 cm)
- Weight: 184 lb (83 kg; 13 st 2 lb)
- Position: Right Wing
- Shot: Right
- Played for: Michigan Tech; Calgary Stampeders
- Playing career: 1957–1964

John M. Kosiancic is a Canadian retired ice hockey right wing who was an All-American for Michigan Tech.

== Career ==
After finishing his junior career with the Lethbridge Native Sons, Kosiancic began attending Michigan Tech in 1956 and joined the varsity team the following year. His first season was fairly pedestrian, but as Michigan Tech finished last in the WIHL, he led the team in goals and was second in points. In his junior season Kosiancic's totals improved significantly as the team rebounded with a 16–10–1 record. He led the team in both goals and points and was named as an AHCA East All-American.

As a senior, Kosiancic helped Michigan Tech finish to a second-place finish in the newly reformed WCHA and then defeat North Dakota in two games to win the first WCHA Tournament championship (shared with Denver). The win gave the Huskies an automatic NCAA tournament berth and the team met St. Lawrence in the semifinal. The two appeared evenly matched through the first 25 minutes of the game but MTU exploded in the second period, scoring eight goals and bouncing the Saints 13–3. They met the WCHA tournament co-champions in the finals and the two teams were well versed with one another. Denver scored the first two goals of the game, coming near the middle of the first and second periods. However, just as they had done against the Larries, Michigan Tech's offense woke up in the middle frame and scored three times in succession to take the lead. Kosiancic assisted on two of the goals, including the go-ahead marker, but Denver erased the lead at the beginning of the third. The two teams battled to no avail for much of the rest of the game and, just when it looked like overtime would be needed, Denver's John MacMillan scored with 63 seconds remaining. MTU pulled their goalie to try and even the score but Denver netted another goal to seal their victory and send the Huskies home.

After graduating Kosiancic continued his playing career for several years, playing three seasons with the Calgary Stampeders. He was inducted into the Michigan Tech Athletic Hall of Fame in 1994.

== Personal ==
Kosiancic was predeceased by his son Paul in 2015. No cause of death was given.

== Career statistics ==
=== Regular season and playoffs ===
			Regular season					Playoffs
Season	Team	League	GP	G	A	Pts	PIM	GP	G	A	Pts	PIM
1955–56	Lethbridge Native Sons	WCJHL	—	—	—	—	—	—	—	—	—	—
1957–58	Michigan Tech	WIHL	27	15	8	23	40	—	—	—	—	—
1958–59	Michigan Tech	NCAA	27	25	28	53	26	—	—	—	—	—
1959–60	Michigan Tech	WCHA	32	24	31	55	30	—	—	—	—	—
1960–61	Calgary Stampeders	WHL	67	13	27	40	0	5	1	0	1	0
1961–62	Calgary Stampeders	WHL	69	20	22	42	13	7	1	0	1	0
1962–63	Calgary Stampeders	WHL	50	15	17	32	12	—	—	—	—	—
1963–64	Drumheller Miners	CAHL	—	—	—	—	—	—	—	—	—	—
NCAA totals			86	64	67	131	96	—	—	—	—	—
WHL totals			186	48	66	114	25	—	—	—	—	—

== Awards and honors ==
Award	Year
AHCA West All-American	1958–59
All-WCHA First Team	1959–60
All-NCAA All-Tournament Second Team	1960
