= Broadway Books =

American book publisher

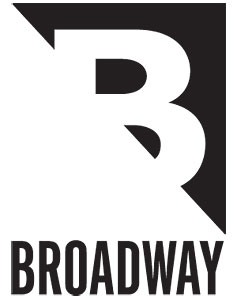
- Parent company: Crown Publishing Group (Random House)
- Founded: 1995
- Country of origin: United States
- Headquarters location: New York City
- Publication types: Books
- Official website: crownpublishing.com/broadway-books

Broadway Books is an imprint of the Crown Publishing Group, a division of Random House, Inc.. It released its first list in Fall 1996. Broadway was founded in 1995 as a unit of Bantam Doubleday Dell, a unit of Bertelsmann. Bertelsmann acquired Random House in 1998 and merged Broadway into a combined group with Doubleday the next year. Random House reorganized again in 2008, with Doubleday moving to Knopf and Broadway moving to its current home at Crown. Broadway's general-interest publishing was combined with Crown in 2010. Broadway became the paperback publisher for the Crown imprint in 2010.

== Publications ==
Broadway Books has published many New York Times bestsellers in hardcover and paperback, including Elizabeth Edwards' memoir Resilience, Bill O'Reilly's memoir A Bold Fresh Piece of Humanity, Decision Points by George W. Bush, Liberal Fascism by Jonah Goldberg, and A Lion Called Christian by Ace Bourke and John Rendall.

Broadway Books publishes a paperback list, in categories including narrative nonfiction, memoir, health and wellness, diet and fitness, inspiration, history, travel and adventure narrative, pop culture, politics, personal finance, popular reference, humor, and contemporary fiction.

Travel writers in their "Broadway Abroad" category were Frances Mayes (Under the Tuscan Sun), Bill Bryson (A Walk in the Woods) and Martin Troost (Lost on Planet China and Getting Stoned With the Savages). Notable memoirs include Eric Clapton's Clapton, the bestselling rock autobiography of all time, the New York Times bestsellers Escape by Carolyn Jessop and No Shortcuts to the Top by climber Ed Viesturs, as well as Tuesdays With Morrie by Mitch Albom and Tim O'Brien's The Things They Carried.

In the field of personal finance, Broadway's titles include David Bach's The Automatic Millionaire and Smart Women Finish Rich. Broadway's books that have been made into films include Kurt Eichenwald's bestselling The Informant and C. D. Payne 's cult classic Youth In Revolt. In diet, health and fitness titles include Lou Arrone's The Skinny, Are You Ready! from television's Biggest Loser's Bob Harper. Broadway Books' cookbook backlist includes vegetarian guru Deborah Madison.

== Authors ==
- David Bach
- Bill Bryson
- Christine Coppa
- Elizabeth Edwards
- Frances Mayes
- Carolyn Jessop
- Bill O'Reilly
- Rebecca Skloot
- Chérie Carter-Scott

== Works published ==
- The Concise Guide To Sounding Smart At Parties
