= Wendall Forbes =

College sports coach

Biographical details
- Born: January 22, 1927; Melrose, Massachusetts, U.S.
- Died: July 31, 1997 (aged 70); Burlington, Massachusetts, U.S.
- Education: Middlebury College

Playing career
- 1947–1951: Middlebury
- Position: Forward / Defenseman

Coaching career (HC unless noted)

Ice Hockey
- 1962–1964: Middlebury (assistant)
- 1964–1986: Middlebury

Head coaching record
- Overall: 248–233–18 (.515)

Accomplishments and honors

Awards
- 1975 Edward Jeremiah Award

Wendall Francis Forbes (January 22, 1927 – July 31, 1997) was an American college coach for the baseball, football, golf and ice hockey teams at Middlebury College. He was the head coach men's ice hockey team for 22 years and was the Division III coach of the year in 1975.

== Career ==
Forbes graduated from Melrose High School in 1945 and joined the Navy for the tail end of World War II. He left the service in 1946 and entered Bridgton Academy before matriculating to Middlebury College. After graduating in 1951, Forbes played in the St. Louis Cardinals organization for six years before ending his playing career and turned to coaching.

He first worked at Northfield High School but quickly transitioned to the college ranks. At Norwich University he was a baseball coach, assistant football coach and the head coach for the freshman hockey team. He returned to Middlebury in 1962 and worked in several positions over the next 25 years. In 1964 Duke Nelson stepped down as the coach of the ice hockey team and allowed Forbes to take over. 'Wendy' took over the program just as it was transitions from ECAC Hockey into the second-tier ECAC 2. His team won the inaugural conference crown with a record of 11–2 and was able to lead the team to winning records most years. After a particularly poor year in 1974, Forbes got his team to rebound and won the first playoff game in team history. For the stark turnaround, Forbes received the Edward Jeremiah Award.

After a slight lull in 1976, Middlebury became one of the top teams in ECAC 2 for the remainder of the decade. In 1979 the Panthers equaled the program high of 19 wins and captured the Western league championship with a 4–2 win over Norwich. Middlebury would have received an invitation to the NCAA Tournament, which was only in its second edition, however, Middlebury's primary conference was the NESCAC and league bylaws prohibited member schools from participating in national tournaments at the time.

After another strong season in 1980, Forbes' team declined sharply and remained near the bottom of the league standings for the next several seasons. As the Panthers began to recover in the mid-80s, Forbes led the program through a second transition as virtually all of the Division II level was dropped down to D-III. He also help shepherd the team through a strange season when ECAC 2 formally split into two regional conferences (East and West). Forbes stepped down as the team's head coach in 1986 and retired.

He was inducted into the Melrose High Athletic Hall of Fame in 1995, the same year that he was able to see his successor, Bill Beaney, lead the Panthers to their first National Championship. He died in 1997 at the age of 70 and was survived by his two daughters, Cathy and Donna, as well as four grandchildren.

== Head coaching record ==
Record table
Season	Team	Overall	Conference	Standing	Postseason
Middlebury Panthers (ECAC 2) (1964–1985)
1964–65	Middlebury	14–8–0	11–2–0	1st	
1965–66	Middlebury	12–12–0	7–5–0	6th	
1966–67	Middlebury	11–10–0	8–3–0	3rd	ECAC 2 Semifinals
1967–68	Middlebury	11–10–1	8–4–1	7th	
1968–69	Middlebury	9–13–0	6–7–0	15th	
1969–70	Middlebury	15–10–0	11–5–0	T–8th	ECAC 2 Semifinals
1970–71	Middlebury	11–13–0	7–10–0	19th	
1971–72	Middlebury	7–12–2	4–6–2	15th	
1972–73	Middlebury	11–11–1	9–7–0	T–10th	ECAC 2 Quarterfinals
1973–74	Middlebury	7–14–0	3–13–0	19th	
1974–75	Middlebury	15–7–1	10–4–1	4th	ECAC 2 Semifinals
1975–76	Middlebury	12–11–0	7–8–0	17th	
1976–77	Middlebury	15–6–1	11–4–1	8th	
1977–78	Middlebury	16–6–0	11–3–0	T–5th	ECAC 2 West Runner-Up
1978–79	Middlebury	19–6–1	14–4–1	T–6th	ECAC 2 West Champion
1979–80	Middlebury	16–7–3	11–5–3	9th	ECAC 2 West Semifinals
1980–81	Middlebury	7–15–1	4–13–1	25th	
1981–82	Middlebury	9–11–3	6–9–2		
1982–83	Middlebury	11–12–1	7–9–1	18th	ECAC 2 West Semifinals
1983–84	Middlebury	10–12–1	5–11–1	22nd	
1984–85	Middlebury	8–14–1	5–12–1	23rd	
Middlebury:		239–220–17	165–144–15		
Middlebury Panthers (ECAC East) (1985–1986)
1985–86	Middlebury	9–13–1	6–9–1	10th	
Middlebury:		9–13–1	6–9–1		
Total:		248–233–18			
National champion Postseason invitational champion Conference regular season champion Conference regular season and conference tournament champion Division regular season champion Division regular season and conference tournament champion Conference tournament champion

Awards and achievements
Preceded by Barry Urbanski	Edward Jeremiah Award; 1974–75	Succeeded by Don Roberts
