= Bob Marquis (ice hockey) =

Canadian ice hockey player

- Born: Montreal, Quebec, Canada
- Height: 5 ft 9 in (175 cm)
- Weight: 174 lb (79 kg; 12 st 6 lb)
- Position: Center
- Played for: Boston University
- Playing career: 1957–1968

Robert "Bob" Marquis is a Canadian retired ice hockey center who was one of three people awarded the NCAA Tournament MOP in 1960.

== Career ==
Marquis came to Boston University in 1956, making the varsity team in his sophomore season. Straight away, coach Harry Cleverly knew he had a star in the making and the team jumped from 13 wins to 17 wins, posting the best record among independent schools. Marquis led the team in scoring finishing 10th in the nation and was named an AHCA East All-American the same year. Despite the program's tremendous season, BU was not selected for the NCAA tournament, and were ranked lower than Harvard.

As a junior, Marquis led a depleted offense with 41 goals; nearly two out of every five goals for the Terriers was scored by Marquis. He was again the team's leading scorer, rising up to 6th in the nation and second in goals (behind only the record-setting production from Phil Latreille). He was again named an East All-American and in recognition of his leadership, he was named team co-captain for his senior season. The Terriers' offense didn't improve much in Marquis' senior season and while he finished with fewer goals he still recorded the same number of points (59). BU finished with a 17–8 record and were the second-ranked team in the east but, instead of just offering the team a bid, the NCAA decided to hold two play-in games for four eastern teams. This was the only time in history that play-in games were used to determine NCAA tournament participants (for the top level of play) but the Terriers were able to surpass Dartmouth in their match and earn the second eastern seed.

In the semifinal, played in their home building, the Terriers played heavy favorite Denver and, though they kept the score close, BU was no match for the offensive firepower possessed by the Pioneers. BU was sent to the consolation match with St. Lawrence and the two teams produced a wild affair that saw the game see-saw between the two for the first two periods before BU pulled ahead for good in the third. Marquis was named to not only All-Tournament First Team, but he was one of three players awarded the NCAA Tournament MOP. This was the only time in the history of the championship the that Most Outstanding Player was given to more than one person (as of 2020) and oddly, none of the three players were on the championship team.

After graduating, Marquis received interest from NHL teams but he passed on a professional career to begin working for General Electric. He did continue to play organized hockey. He was on at least two different independent amateur teams during the 1960s, with records of him dating to as late as 1968.

Marquis was inducted into the Boston University Athletic Hall of Fame in 1967, the Beanpot Hall of Fame in 1997 and was the program's all-time leading goal scorer until 1998 when he was passed by Chris Drury (in more than twice as many games).

== Statistics ==
=== Regular season and playoffs ===
			Regular season					Playoffs
Season	Team	League	GP	G	A	Pts	PIM	GP	G	A	Pts	PIM
1957–58	Boston University	NCAA	23	24	22	46	—	—	—	—	—	—
1958–59	Boston University	NCAA	23	41	18	59	—	—	—	—	—	—
1959–60	Boston University	NCAA	27	33	26	59	—	—	—	—	—	—
NCAA totals			73	98	66	164	82	—	—	—	—	—

== Awards and honors ==
Award	Year
AHCA East All-American	1957–58
AHCA East All-American	1958–59
All-NCAA All-Tournament First Team	1960

Awards and achievements
Preceded by Reg Morelli	NCAA Tournament Most Outstanding Player; 1960 With Lou Angotti & Barry Urbanski	Succeeded by Bill Masterton
