= Coppi =

Coppi is a surname. Notable people with the surname include:

- Bruno Coppi (born 1935), Italian-American physicist
- Célia Coppi (born 1980), Brazilian handball player
- Fausto Coppi (1919–1960), Italian cyclist
- Hans Coppi (1916–1942), German resistance fighter
- Hans Coppi Jr. (born 1942) German historian
- Hilde Coppi (née Rake, 1909–1943), German resistance fighter
- Jacopo Coppi called "Jacopo del Meglio" ("the Best") (1523–1591), Italian painter
- Serse Coppi (1923–1951) Italian cyclist, brother of Fausto

== Other ==
- Cima Coppi, title given to the highest peak in the yearly running of the Giro d'Italia

== See also ==
- Coppa (surname)
- Coppo
