= George Kirkwood =

Canadian ice hockey player

- Born: 1937 Edmonton, Alberta, Canada
- Died: 2022 (aged 84–85) Edmonton, Alberta]], Canada
- Height: 5 ft 8 in (173 cm)
- Weight: 155 lb (70 kg; 11 st 1 lb)
- Position: Goaltender
- Played for: Denver
- Playing career: 1959–1961

George Kirkwood was a Canadian ice hockey goaltender who backstopped Denver to consecutive National Championships in the early 1960s.

== Career ==
Kirkwood played junior hockey in his hometown of Edmonton for several years with the Edmonton Oil Kings of the Western League. After turning down an offer to sign with the Montreal Canadiens organization, Kirkwood took Murray Armstrong's offer to bring him to Denver on scholarship after the Pioneers captured their first NCAA Championship in 1958. Kirkwood played on the Denver freshman team before joining the varsity squad in 1959 and became an instant success for the Pios. As a sophomore, Kirkwood helped lead Denver to a top finish in the inaugural WCHA season and was named co-Sophomore of the Year He was named to the All-WCHA First Team but was left off of the All-American roster as some believed his success was more a function of the team's dominance rather than his own play.

In the first WCHA Tournament, Kirkwood surrendered only 3 goals in 2 games to help Denver win the western bracket and be declared co-champions. The second win gave Kirkwood his 25th win of the season, breaking the NCAA record not only for first year players, but for any goaltender in one campaign. Denver was the favorite in the NCAA Tournament and did not disappoint, winning both games to capture their second championship. Kirkwood was named to the All-Tournament Second Team for his steady performance in goal.

The next season Denver was a powerhouse who dominated almost every team they faced. The team won 30 of their 32 games with Kirkwood between the pipes for every minute. Kirkwood became the first goaltender to win 30 games in a season and set program records with a goals against average of 1.84 and a save percentage of .910. He was first team All-WCHA and was one of 5 Pioneers to appear on the AHCA All-American team. The team ran through the postseason, eviscerating the competition. In the two-game conference series, Denver won by the largest margin in history (17–3) and nearly accomplished the same in the national tournament. They dropped Minnesota 6–1 in the semifinal before torching St. Lawrence 12–2 in the title game. The win over the Saints was the largest for any championship match while their overall +15 margin was second only to Colorado College in 1950.

Denied his final third year of varsity eligibility by a new NCAA rule in 1961 designed to penalize programs like Denver for rostering 20 year old freshmen from Canada, Kirkwood was heartbroken by the ruling. He went on to earn his engineering degree, and he became a successful oil executive and former president of the Edmonton Petroleum Club in his native Alberta.

He was inducted into the Denver Athletic Hall of Fame in 2007 and is still remembered as one of the best goaltenders ever to play for Crimson and Gold.

He died in April of 2022 in his native Alberta.

== Statistics ==
=== Regular season and playoffs ===
			Regular season									Playoffs
Season	Team	League	GP	W	L	T	MIN	GA	SO	GAA	SV%	GP	W	L	MIN	GA	SO	GAA	SV%
1954–55	Red Deer Rustlers	WCJHL	—	—	—	—	—	—	—	—	—	—	—	—	—	—	—	—	—
1955–56	Edmonton Flyers	WHL	—	—	—	—	—	—	—	—	—	—	—	—	—	—	—	—	—
1955–56	Edmonton Oil Kings	WCJHL	—	—	—	—	—	—	—	—	—	—	—	—	—	—	—	—	—
1956–57	Edmonton Oil Kings	CAHL	—	—	—	—	—	—	—	—	—	—	—	—	—	—	—	—	—
1959–60	Denver	WCHA	34	27	4	3	—	—	2	2.50	.900	—	—	—	—	—	—	—	—
1960–61	Denver	WCHA	32	30	1	1	—	59	4	1.84	.910	—	—	—	—	—	—	—	—
NCAA totals			66	57	5	4	—	—	6	2.20	.904	—	—	—	—	—	—	—	—

== Awards and honors ==
Award	Year
All-WCHA First Team	1959–60
NCAA All-Tournament Second Team	1960, 1961
All-WCHA First Team	1960–61
AHCA West All-American	1960–61

Awards and achievements
Preceded by Award Created	WCHA Sophomore of the Year; 1959–60 With Lou Angotti	Succeeded by Jack Wilson
