= Koppa (disambiguation) =

Koppa is an archaic Greek letter and numeral symbol.

Koppa may also refer to:

- Koppa (Cyrillic), an archaic Cyrillic symbol derived from the Greek letter
- Koppa, India, a town in Karnataka, India
- Sudhi Koppa, an Indian film actor

== See also ==
- Olavi Köppä (1951–2025), Finnish speed skater
- Coppa (disambiguation)
- Copper (disambiguation)
- Koopa (disambiguation)
- Koppal (disambiguation)
