= Coppa =

Coppa or COPPA may refer to:

- Coppa or capocollo, a type of Italian pork cold cut
- Montonico bianco, a white Italian wine grape variety grown in the Calabria region of southern Italy
- Coppa (surname)
- Coppa Italia, a domestic Italian league cup
- Children's Online Privacy Protection Act (COPPA), a United States federal cyber law

== See also ==
- Council of Parent Attorneys and Advocates (COPAA)
- Koppa (disambiguation)
- Copper (disambiguation)
