= The Concise Guide to Sounding Smart at Parties =

Book by David Matalon and Chris Woolsey

The Concise Guide to Sounding Smart at Parties book cover

The Concise Guide to Sounding Smart at Parties: An Irreverent Compendium of Must Know Info from Sputnik to Smallpox and Marie Curie to Mao is a humorous collection of pop-culture knowledge published by Broadway Books, an imprint of the Doubleday Broadway Publishing Group which is a division of Random House Inc. Authors David Matalon and Chris Woolsey are screenwriters and actors in Los Angeles.

== Structure ==
The book is structured so that each chapter can help the reader master a different facet of pop-culture knowledge ranging from art to politics and religion to business.

The forward for the book was written by Michael J. Nelson, former host and head writer of Mystery Science Theater 3000 and author of Love Sick.

== Release ==
The book was featured on Good Morning America, Fox and Friends, Oprah and Friends with Gayle King, and The Wall Street Journal.

The book caused some controversy when a rumor appeared on Page Six of the New York Post that suggested that Britney Spears' ex-husband, Kevin Federline showed up at the Hollywood launch party for the book and asked the authors for some pointers on how he could sound smart.
