= Chérie Carter-Scott =

Chérie Carter-Scott, Ph.D., MCC
- Born: May 30, 1949 (age 77); Long Branch, New Jersey, U.S.
- Occupations: Author, life coach
- Website: www.drcherie.com

Chérie Carter-Scott, Ph.D., MCC (born May 30, 1949) is a #1 New York Times Best Selling author, and Master Certified Executive and life coach, often referred to as "The Mother of Coaching" due to her pioneer work in the coaching industry.

== Education ==
Carter-Scott attended Convent of the Sacred Heart in New York City, and briefly boarded at Sacred Heart in Greenwich, Connecticut. She attended Bradford College, followed by the University of Dijon, in France, then the University of Denver where she received her BA in theatre education; then she attended the University of Minnesota graduate school in theatre, and Fielding Graduate University in Santa Barbara where she received her MA and Ph.D. in 1994 in Human and Organizational Development.

Her dissertation was focused on the relationship between employee satisfaction and customer satisfaction.

== Career ==
Carter-Scott started coaching professionally October 15, 1974, when a colleague asked her to help him with his business. Carter-Scott managed to solve his business problems and started building her coaching practice based on asking questions rather than providing answers. [source] In 1974, she established Motivation Management Service (MMS). The organization provided programs and consulting in management development, communication, leadership, organizational development, and personal development. It subsequently developed into MMS Worldwide Institute, through which Carter-Scott and other instructors provided coach education and training. After that, she started training professional life coaches in 1975. She has been coaching and training coaches ever since. She specializes in motivation, self-esteem, customer relations, change management, communication, team building, leadership training and overcoming Negaholism, coaching skills for HR professionals, employee engagement, Employee Owned Change, Feedback, Inner Negotiation Workshop, Customer Service, Masterclasses for already trained coaches, Coach Training, presentation skills, self-management, stress management, teambuilding, Inner Negotiation Workshop for teens, women in leadership, diversity training, HR leadership, interviewing skills, management development, performance appraisal, time management. which is one of the key concepts in Carter-Scott's coaching school of thought. She defines it as "a condition where people unconsciously talk themselves out of their visions, dreams, and goals. They diminish their capabilities, tell themselves that they can't have what they want, and at times even sabotage their wishes, desires, and aspirations". Her original work in overcoming Negativity started in 1974 and was formalized in 1989 with the publication of her book, Negaholics. She is considered a pioneer in human development, laying the groundwork in overcoming negativity and helping individuals and organizations "realize their dreams".

Carter-Scott developed a framework referred to as "Employee Owned Change", which involves the participation of employees in organizational change processes.

Carter-Scott was professor of Leadership, Management, Organizational Behavior, and Coaching INSEAD, Antioch and Webster Universities for limited engagements because of other commitments.

== Coaching ==
In 2013, she received her Master Certified Coaching credential from the International Coach Federation and was recognized as one of ICF's 100 pre-eminent Assessors worldwide. She is currently the CEO of the MMS Institute LLC, a firm which specializes in global Coach Trainings, personal development and custom-designed professional training programs, which received ICF accreditation as a school authorized by the ICF to teach and train students globally. In order to coach CEOs, Carter-Scott needed to know from the inside out what it means to be at the helm. Running a global business on three continents with her sister Lynn U. Stewart, her husband Michael Pomije and their licensed business partners has stretched them to learn and work with multi-cultural diversity and to bring the soft skills of coaching and training to countries around the world. For example, the MMS Coach Training partner in Vietnam, LCV is the #1 coaching school in the entire country. She originally founded MMS (short for: Motivation Management Service) in San Francisco in 1974 and in 1988 the MMS Institute expanded to Europe by licensing its first course in the Netherlands. Through MMS, Carter-Scott has delivered trainings to several corporate clients that include Fortune 500 companies worldwide such as American Express, IBM, Better Homes and Gardens Magazine, Burger King, Chicken Soup for the Soul Enterprises, Cigna Global Healthcare, Estee Lauder, CH, FMC, Ford Motor Company, Genpact Corporation, KPMG Thailand, GTE/GTEL, Hyperion Solutions, MGM Resorts, Meredith Corporation, Montecito Bank and trust, Pandora Production Thailand, Platinum Technologies, Republic Indemnity Corporation, US Air National Guard, ThyssenKrupp, Covestro, Unilever, and Vitallife Corporation, MGM Resorts, KPMG, Cigna Global Healthcare, Hyperion Solutions, Pandora Production, Thailand, GTE, Republic Indemnity.

With NSG requesting to be licensed to represent the Negaholic content, the licensing program was launched in 1998. Next was a client in the Netherlands in 2000 that requested to be licensed to promote, produce, and present the MMS courses in Holland. Following this was Switzerland, Singapore, Hungary, Vietnam, Thailand.

== Writing ==
- If Life Is A Game, These Are the Rules
- If Love Is a Game, These Are the Rules
- If Success Is a Game, These Are the Rules
- If High School Is a Game, Here's How to Break the Rules
- The Gift of Motherhood
- Negaholics
- Corporate Negaholics
- Negaholics No More!
- Waves of Change
- The Art of Giving
- Baby Boomer's Bible to Life After Fifty
- The New Species
- The Inner View
- Become One
- If Life Is a Game, These Are the Stories
- What is Your Message?
- Transformational Life Coaching
- Life IS a Game: Life Lessons Learned Living the Rules for Being Human

In total she has produced 61 works in 172 publications in 40 languages and 6,485 library holdings. Her most popular book, If Life is a Game These are the Rules, was published by Broadway books in over 40 countries, sold over 4 million copies and was ranked by the New York Times as #1 bestseller. She has also contributed with chapters in numerous books including Coaching and Mentoring in the Asia Pacific.

== Media appearances ==
Carter-Scott has been a guest on The Oprah Winfrey Show with Negaholics, How to Overcome Negativity and Turn Your Life Around, which was licensed by NSG who productixes and marketed Carter Scott's concepts and materials throughout the US and Canada. Her second appearance on the Oprah Winfrey show happened with the publication of "If Life Is a Game" and through "Change Your Life TV". In that occasion Carter-Scott coached audience members live on camera. After experiencing media training in Los Angeles in 1989, Carter-Scott appeared on numerous international media shows that include: The Today Show, the O'Reilly Factor, The Other Half, CNN, Politically Incorrect with Bill Maher, Sally Jesse Raphael TV show, Montel Williams TV, Jenny Jones TV, Janyla van Zant TV, Leeza Live, Arabella Kiesbauer show (Germany), 7DTV with Ronnie Overgoor (Netherlands) and more than 500 radio and tv shows worldwide. She has been on worldwide media tours that followed the publication of her books to the US, China, Italy, Czech Republic, the Netherlands, Germany, and Finland. Carter-Scott has worked on five continents in over 30 countries.

Carter-Scott is executive producer of, and was featured on-camera in LEAP!, a first-of-its-kind documentary on coaching that tracks the lives of 4 individuals and the transformation they experience through the coaching process. LEAP was released in 2018 and has been nominated for 9 film festivals. It has won five awards and is currently available on Amazon and iTunes.

== Theatre and other work ==
Carter-Scott is also the co-writer, songwriter, lyricist, and executive producer for the original musical The Workshop, a Dress Rehearsal for Life! that premiered in Bangkok, Thailand, May 2019. Carter-Scott was the first to use coaching in a theatrical production and the musical features 11 highly diverse participants, each of them with different challenges, who come together for a personal development workshop that will support them in discovering their blindspot and overcome their current obstacles. The musical is tightly linked to Carter Scott's coaching methodology since the workshop that takes place on a thrust stage is based on one of Carter Scott's courses, the Inner Negotiation Workshop.

At Bradford College, Carter-Scott asked if she, as a student, could produce and direct a production. She was told that since the start of the college in 1803 this had never been sanctioned. Carter-Scott promptly initiated contact with Megan Terry, writer of Comings and Goings and bought the rights to her play. Carter-Scott conducted auditions in Haverhill, Mass and then proceeded to launch the first student produced and directed production in the history of the college. In 1979, she approached Viacom about her concept for a TV show. She was met with skeptical rebuke, yet she persisted. The result was 26-half hour shows titled, Inner View. Her guests included Daniel and Patricia Elsberg, Jerry Jampolsky (Love is Letting Go of Fear), Thomas Gordon (Parent Effectiveness Training), Helga Howie (designer), Willie Brown (SF politician), Richard Litwin (ophthalmologist in 3rd world countries & Berkeley), and many others. Her purpose was to demonstrate that the media could do more than entertain and educate, that it could inspire the viewer to believe in him/herself. In 1985, Lynn, Carter-Scott's sister and she started "Extended Family Services" a cultural exchange program across the globe which took 18-25 year-old young adults for a "Gap" year. The program selected, trained, and placed these young adults in families on the opposite side of the ocean to manage a household for busy executives, two-paycheck households, or single parents for one year.

Carter-Scott has developed and filmed her own content for 130 Virtual Training modules produced in partnership with LSVT in Las Vegas.

== Personal life ==
Carter-Scott has lived in France, Switzerland, Netherlands and Thailand as well as the US. In 1998 she got an instrument-rated private pilot license and obtained her PADI scuba diving certification despite blocked ears and confirmation that she would never be able to scuba dive.
