= Bill Masterton =

Canadian ice hockey player (1938–1968)

- Masterton with the Minnesota North Stars during the 1967-68 season
- Born: August 13, 1938 Winnipeg, Manitoba, Canada
- Died: January 15, 1968 (aged 29) Edina, Minnesota, U.S.
- Height: 6 ft 0 in (183 cm)
- Weight: 189 lb (86 kg; 13 st 7 lb)
- Position: Centre
- Shot: Right
- Played for: Minnesota North Stars
- National team: United States
- Playing career: 1961–1968

William John Masterton (August 13, 1938 – January 15, 1968) was a Canadian–American professional ice hockey player who was a centre in the National Hockey League (NHL) for the Minnesota North Stars in 1967–68. He is the only player in NHL history to die as a direct result of injuries suffered during a game. He died following a hit during a January 13, 1968, contest against the Oakland Seals. Years later, an analysis by The Toronto Star found his brain was already severely damaged from an earlier untreated concussion, and that the January 1968 hit triggered massive head trauma that ultimately killed him.

A college standout with the Denver Pioneers, Masterton was a member of National Collegiate Athletic Association (NCAA) championship teams in 1960 and 1961, was twice an NCAA All-Star and was the most outstanding player of the 1961 NCAA men's ice hockey tournament. He briefly played in the Montreal Canadiens organization before settling in Minnesota where he played senior ice hockey. The NHL's 1967 expansion offered an opportunity to play for the newly founded North Stars, for whom he scored the first goal in the franchise's history.

Masterton's death sparked a long-running debate in hockey about the merits of wearing helmets, as few NHL players did so at the time. Despite several efforts to mandate their use, it was 11 years before the NHL made them compulsory for all new players beginning in the 1979–80 season, and it was almost 30 years after the incident when the league became fully helmeted. In his memory, the NHL created the Bill Masterton Memorial Trophy, which it has awarded since 1968 to a player who demonstrates perseverance and dedication to hockey. The North Stars retired his jersey number 19, an honour that followed the franchise when it became the Dallas Stars.

== Playing career ==
A Winnipegger, Masterton played two seasons of junior ice hockey with the St. Boniface Canadiens of the Manitoba Junior Hockey League (MJHL). He averaged a goal per game and finished with 49 points in 22 games in 1955–56 as the Canadiens won the Turnbull Cup. He added eight points in six games during the Memorial Cup playdowns, however St. Boniface failed to reach the national championship final. Following a second season in which he recorded 53 points in 30 games, Masterton chose to attend the University of Denver where he was offered a scholarship to play for the Denver Pioneers.

Masterton played three seasons in Denver between 1958 and 1961, appearing in a total of 89 games, scoring 66 goals and 130 assists for 196 points in that time. At the time of his graduation, he was the Pioneers' all-time leading point scorer, a record he held for 25 years. He was a two-time NCAA All-American and was twice named to the Western Collegiate Hockey Association (WCHA) All-Star team, earning both awards in 1960 and 1961. Masterton led the WCHA in scoring in 1959–60 with 44 points in conference play, and led Denver to the 1960 NCAA national championship. Masterton served as team captain for 1960–61, and was named the most outstanding player of the 1961 national championship as he led Denver to a second consecutive title. The Pioneers finished the season with a 30–1–1 record and were hailed as "the greatest hockey team to ever represent an American college or university."

Turning to professional ice hockey after graduating with an engineering degree, Masterton signed a contract with the Montreal Canadiens in 1961. Led by Jean Béliveau and Henri Richard, the Canadiens were extremely deep at centre, so Masterton was assigned to the Hull-Ottawa Canadiens of the Eastern Professional Hockey League (EPHL). He had 31 goals and 65 points for Hull-Ottawa, placing him in the top ten in both categories. Masterton was promoted to the Cleveland Barons of the American Hockey League (AHL) for the 1962–63 season, where he led the team with 82 points. He finished as the runner up to Doug Robinson for the Dudley "Red" Garrett Memorial Award as the AHL's top rookie.

Faced with little opportunity to make the Montreal roster, Masterton left the professional game to complete his master's degree at the University of Denver. He settled in Minneapolis, Minnesota, where he took a job in contracts administration. He joined the Honeywell Corporation where he worked on the Apollo program. He and his wife Carol adopted two children, Scott and Sally.

After taking a year off from ice hockey in 1964, Masterton regained his amateur status so that he could play senior ice hockey in the United States Hockey League (USHL). He played two seasons with the St. Paul Steers between 1964 and 1966. Masterton became a naturalized American citizen, allowing him to join the United States national team in 1966–67. He served as captain on that team and was considered its most valuable player.

=== Minnesota North Stars ===
"Because he had a habit of giving everything he had for every second he was on the ice, Bill was the type of player who didn't have to score a lot of goals to help a club."

— North Stars coach Wren Blair describes Masterton's qualities as a player.

The National Hockey League (NHL) expanded in 1967, doubling from 6 teams to 12. Among the new entries were the Minnesota North Stars. The new team's coach and general manager, Wren Blair, had scouted Masterton while he played with the US Nationals and purchased his NHL playing rights from the Canadiens. Masterton was the first player to sign with Minnesota, agreeing to a two-year contract. He said prior to the start of the 1967–68 season that being able to play in Minnesota was key as he would have been unlikely to consider an offer with any other team.

At the age of 29, Masterton made his NHL debut in the North Stars' inaugural game, played on October 11, 1967, against the St. Louis Blues. In that game, a 2–2 tie, Masterton scored the first goal in Minnesota franchise history. His wife Carol later recalled that it was a "dream come true" for her husband: "He always wanted a shot at the NHL, and expansion was a wonderful thing for him and guys like him." By mid-season, Masterton had recorded four goals and eight assists in 38 games.

== Death ==
Masterton suffered a severe internal brain injury during the first period of Minnesota's January 13, 1968, game against the Oakland Seals at the Met Center. He carried the puck up the ice at full speed, passing it off as two Seals defencemen, Larry Cahan and Ron Harris, converged on him. Masterton was knocked backward in the resulting collision and landed on his head. Like most players of his era, he was not wearing a helmet. Referee Wally Harris compared the hit to an explosion, adding "he was checked hard, but I'm sure it wasn't a dirty play." The force of the impact caused Masterton to bleed from his nose, ears, and mouth. The impact of the hit caused him to lose consciousness before he hit the ice; according to some accounts, he briefly came to and muttered, "Never again, never again" before passing back out. He received treatment on the ice and in the dressing room before being rushed to Fairview-Southdale Hospital in nearby Edina, Minnesota.

His wife Carol, who was watching the game from the stands, and Masterton's parents, who were listening to the game from their home in Winnipeg, rushed to his bedside at the hospital. He was attended to by two neurosurgeons and three other doctors. They soon concluded that the injury was too severe for surgery to be a viable option. Some 30 hours after his fall, on January 15, Masterton died without ever regaining consciousness. His parents, brother, wife and two children were at his side. Masterton's Minnesota teammates, who were playing a game in Boston on January 14, were informed that he had been removed from life support in the dressing room in what was ultimately a 9–2 loss to the Boston Bruins. He is the only player in NHL history to die as a direct result of an injury suffered on the ice.

Ron Harris was haunted for many years by his role in Masterton's death: "It bothers you the rest of your life. It wasn't dirty and it wasn't meant to happen that way. Still, it's very hard because I made the play. It's always in the back of my mind." However, Masterton's family held no animosity towards the players involved or the game. Carol referred to the incident as a fluke, saying that it could have happened to anyone.

== Legacy ==
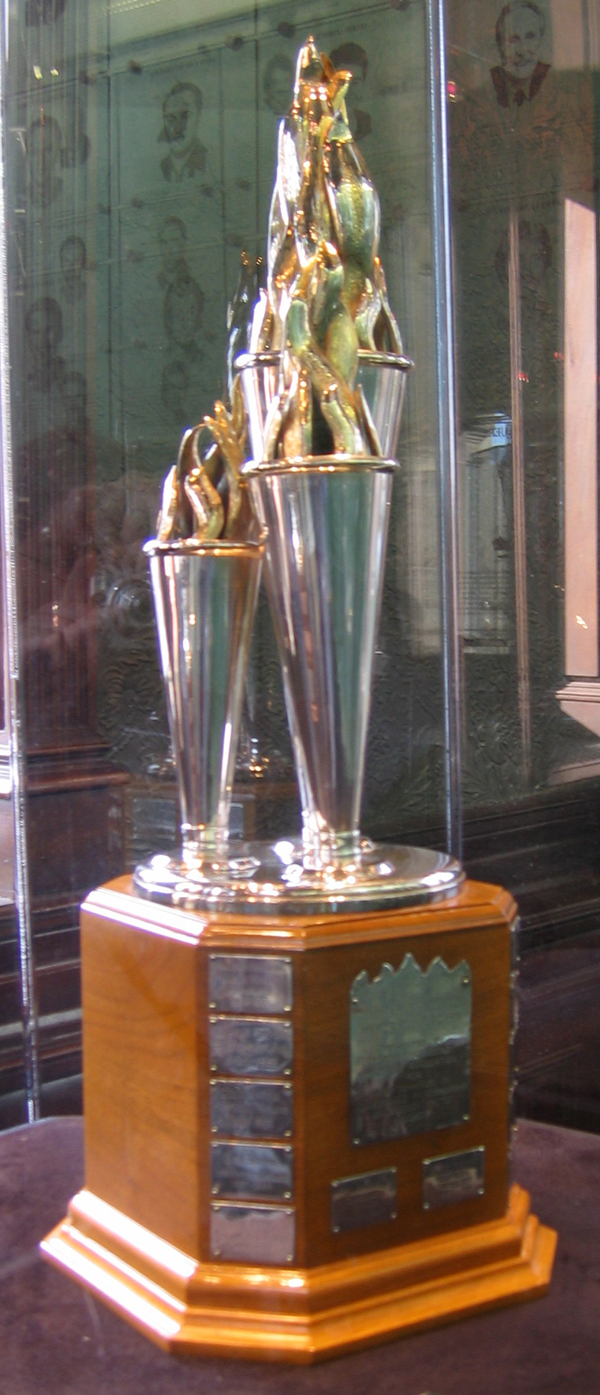
The Bill Masterton Memorial Trophy was created in 1968.

Few NHL players wore helmets in 1968. According to several of Masterton's teammates, wearing a helmet was frowned upon in the NHL of that era; at least one North Stars player who wore a helmet during a game was traded after the season. However, Masterton's death sparked an immediate debate on whether their use should be compulsory. Legislators in New York considered a law to make their use mandatory, and the NHL voted on and rejected a rule requiring players wear helmets three times by 1971.

Some players began to wear helmets following Masterton's death, but adoption was slow. Three years later, only six Minnesota players wore them, the most of any of the NHL's teams. The "macho" attitude of the game, including fear of being called a coward, was an often cited reason for reluctance. It was 11 years before the NHL finally mandated the use of helmets by all players entering the league beginning in the 1979–80 season.

A later analysis by the Toronto Star in 2011 concluded Masterton died of complications from an earlier, untreated concussion. The Star suggested that the "macho" attitude of the NHL in that era, as well as Masterton's aggressive playing style, played a significant role in his death. Coach Wren Blair believed Masterton was playing through a pre-existing brain hemorrhage. Blair revealed that for over 40 years, he had never really believed Masterton died from the hit itself. Blair also recalled that and the North Stars' trainer had noticed Masterton's face had been "blood red, almost purple" for some time. They were concerned enough that they wanted Masterton checked out by a doctor. However, Masterton brushed it off. Longtime NHL coach John Muckler, who was then the coach of the North Stars' second-tier farm team, the Memphis South Stars, believed that Masterton may have suffered a brain injury as early as training camp. During the season, several players and coaches recalled seeing Masterton black out during rushes in practice. Goaltender Cesare Maniago recalled that the night before the fatal hit, Masterton had been complaining of severe migraines that he had had for over a week. They felt it caused what was otherwise viewed as a clean, albeit hard, bodycheck to turn fatal. Toronto neurosurgeon and concussion expert Charles Tator reviewed Masterton's autopsy and opined that Masterton had suffered second-impact syndrome, which occurs when a person suffers a second concussion on top of an earlier, untreated concussion. When this happens, it can cause rapid and often fatal brain swelling.

Several awards were named in Masterton's memory. The Bill Masterton Memorial Trophy was created in 1968 under the trusteeship of the Professional Hockey Writers' Association (PHWA) and is presented annually to the "National Hockey League player who best exemplifies the qualities of perseverance, sportsmanship and dedication to hockey". The University of Denver Pioneers ice hockey team named its most valuable player award after him, and his Winnipeg high school, Miles Macdonell Collegiate, presents a scholarship in his name. High schools in Bloomington, where the North Stars played their games, also award scholarships in Masterton's name. The Minnesota North Stars formally retired Masterton's number 19 jersey in 1987. However, it had not been reissued since his death, and it was understood long before 1987 that no North Star would ever wear it again. That honour followed the franchise when it relocated south to become the Dallas Stars.

Masterton is an honored Member of the Manitoba Hockey Hall of Fame, he was inducted into the Colorado Sports Hall of Fame in 1985, and named to the NCAA's 50th anniversary team in 1997.

== Career statistics ==
			Regular season					Playoffs
Season	Team	League	GP	G	A	Pts	PIM	GP	G	A	Pts	PIM
1955–56	St. Boniface Canadiens	MJHL	22	23	26	49	16	4	4	2	6	2
1955–56	St. Boniface Canadiens	Mem-Cup	—	—	—	—	—	6	3	5	8	2
1956–57	St. Boniface Canadiens	MJHL	30	23	30	53	16	7	8	10	18	2
1958–59	Denver Pioneers	NCAA	23	21	28	49	6	—	—	—	—	—
1959–60	Denver Pioneers	WCHA	34	21	46	67	2	—	—	—	—	—
1960–61	Denver Pioneers	WCHA	32	24	56	80	4	—	—	—	—	—
1961–62	Hull-Ottawa Canadiens	EPHL	65	31	35	66	18	12	0	4	4	0
1962–63	Cleveland Barons	AHL	72	27	55	82	12	7	4	5	9	2
1965–66	St. Paul Steers	USHL	30	27	40	67	6	—	—	—	—	—
1966–67	United States	NAT TM	23	10	29	39	4	—	—	—	—	—
1967–68	Minnesota North Stars	NHL	38	4	8	12	4	—	—	—	—	—
NHL totals			38	4	8	12	4	—	—	—	—	—

== Awards and honours ==
Award	Year	Ref
WCHA First All-Star Team	1959–60, 1960–61	
NCAA West All-American	1959–60, 1960–61	
All-NCAA All-Tournament First Team	1961	
NCAA tournament Most Outstanding Player	1961	

== See also ==
- List of ice hockey players who died during their playing career

Awards and achievements
Preceded by Lou Angotti, Bob Marquis, Barry Urbanski	NCAA tournament Most Outstanding Player; 1961	Succeeded by Lou Angotti
