= Christine Coppa =

American writer

- Education: University of the Arts (MFA)
- Genre: Parenting and Lifestyle
- Notable works: Rattled!

Website
- christinecoppa.com

Christine Coppa is an American author, blogger and columnist. She is best known for her book Rattled!, published by Broadway Books in 2009. The book was named a Target Breakout Book.

== Early life ==
Coppa grew up in Wayne, New Jersey. She received a MFA in creative writing from the University of the Arts.

== Career ==
Coppa is the founding blogger of Storked! blog featured on glamour.com. As a professional writer and editor, she has contributed to Glamour, Marie Claire (Australia), Philadelphia Magazine, First, In Touch Weekly, and Pregnancy magazine among other publications. Her work was mentioned in The New York Times. The Sunday Times called her a writer "at the forefront of a wave of modern moms who are reinventing the parental publishing genre." New York Post called her "the ultimate sanctimommy". She appeared as herself in Murderball.
