= Selena Coppa =

United States Army soldier

- Military career
- Branch: United States Army
- Service years: 2001–2009
- Rank: Sergeant
- Other work: Political Activism

Selena Coppa is an ex-military intelligence Sergeant in the United States Army.

== Protest activities ==
In March 2008, Coppa testified at the Winter Soldier: Iraq & Afghanistan hearings.
