= Koppal (Rural) =

Village in India

- District
- Location in Karnataka, India Koppal (India)
- Coordinates: 15°21′N 76°09′E
- Country: India
- State: Karnataka
- District: Koppal
- Talukas: Koppal

Government
  - Body: Jilla panchayat

Population (2001)
  - Total: 12,584

Languages
  - Official: Kannada
- Time zone: UTC+5:30 (IST)
- ISO 3166 code: IN-KA
- Vehicle registration: KA

Koppal (District) is a District in the southern state of Karnataka, India.

== Demographics ==
As of 2001 India census, Koppal (Rural) had a population of 12,584 with 6,383 males and 6,201 females.

== See also ==
- Koppal
- Districts of Karnataka
