= Rusty Ingersoll =

American ice hockey player

- Born: Duluth, MN, USA
- Height: 5 ft 11 in (180 cm)
- Weight: 185 lb (84 kg; 13 st 3 lb)
- Position: Defenseman
- Played for: Dartmouth
- Playing career: 1957–1960

Russell W. "Rusty" Ingersoll is an American retired ice hockey defenseman who was an All-American for Dartmouth.

== Career ==
Ingersoll began attending Dartmouth College in 1956 and played on the freshman team during his first year at the university. After joining the varsity team the following autumn, Ingersoll began making a name for himself on the defense and would prove to be one of the team's top defensemen over his three years with the program. Ingersoll's arrival coincided with a revival of the team's fortunes and, during his junior year, the Indians produced their best record in a decade. Dartmouth won the Ivy League title in 1959 and finished with a 17–8 record, but were passed over by the selection committee for Boston College who had gone 19–7. The next season Ingersoll was chosen as team captain and he led Dartmouth to an even better record, going 14–4–1 and earning a second consecutive Ivy championship. At the end of the season Dartmouth was ranked as the 3rd best eastern team and an extraordinary measure was taken. For the only time in history, the top four teams played singular games against one another after their schedules were completed. Dartmouth faced Boston University with the understanding that the victor would be invited to participate in the NCAA tournament. Unfortunately, Dartmouth's offense faltered in the game and the Indians lost 1–4. Ingersoll received a bit of a consolation prize after the loss by being named as an eastern All-American.

After graduating, Ingersoll surprised many by pursuing a career as an Episcopal priest and later worked as an educator. He raised a great deal of money while working with the Dartmouth College Fund and was honored with the Dartmouth Class of 1960 Presidents Award in 2017.

== Career statistics ==
			Regular Season					Playoffs
Season	Team	League	GP	G	A	Pts	PIM	GP	G	A	Pts	PIM
1957–58	Dartmouth	NCAA	—	—	—	—	—	—	—	—	—	—
1958–59	Dartmouth	NCAA	—	12	19	31	—	—	—	—	—	—
1959–60	Dartmouth	NCAA	—	12	14	26	—	—	—	—	—	—
NCAA Totals			—	—	—	—	—	—	—	—	—	—

== Awards and honors ==
Award	Year
AHCA East All-American	1959–60
