= Lou Angotti =

Canadian ice hockey player and coach (1938–2021)

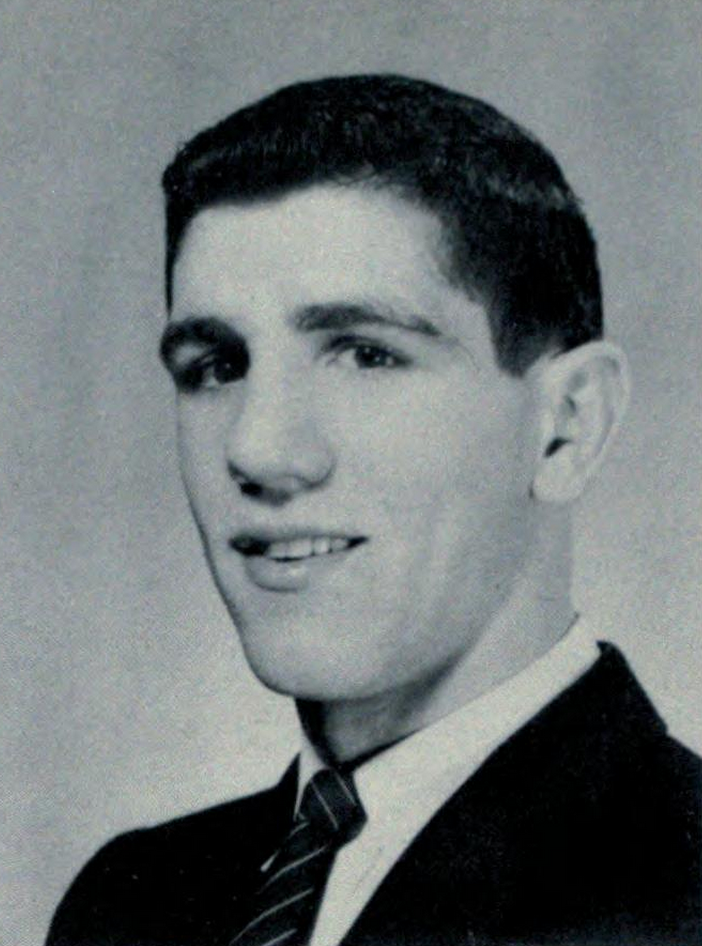
- Angotti at St. Michaels, c. 1957
- Born: January 16, 1938 Toronto, Ontario, Canada
- Died: September 15, 2021 (aged 83) Fort Lauderdale, Florida, U.S.
- Height: 5 ft 9 in (175 cm)
- Weight: 170 lb (77 kg; 12 st 2 lb)
- Position: Right wing
- Shot: Right
- Played for: New York Rangers; Chicago Black Hawks; Philadelphia Flyers; Pittsburgh Penguins; St. Louis Blues; Chicago Cougars
- Playing career: 1962–1975

Louis Frederick Angotti (January 16, 1938 – September 15, 2021) was a Canadian professional ice hockey player and coach who played ten seasons in the National Hockey League (NHL). He played for the New York Rangers, Chicago Black Hawks, Philadelphia Flyers, Pittsburgh Penguins, and St. Louis Blues from 1964 to 1974.

== Early life ==
Angotti was born in Toronto on January 16, 1938. He played his junior hockey for the Toronto St. Michael's Majors. He then enrolled in Michigan Tech University where he earned an engineering degree while skating for powerful college clubs. He appeared in two NCAA championship games, losing the 1960 game while winning in 1962. He was MVP of both tournaments and was All-WCHA First Team for 1961–62.

== Professional career ==
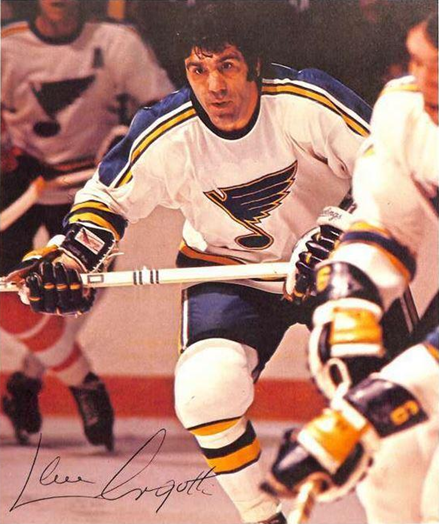
1973 photo of Angotti in action for St. Louis Blues

Angotti signed with the New York Rangers of the National Hockey League (NHL), playing two seasons with the minor league Rochester Americans before being called up to the big league club in 1964–65. Angotti quickly became known for his high-energy, speedy play. Over the next nine seasons, he played with the Chicago Black Hawks, Philadelphia Flyers, Pittsburgh Penguins, and St. Louis Blues. He had his best offensive season in 1967–68 with the Flyers, when he scored 49 points while serving as the club's first captain. During his second stint with Chicago (from 1969 through 1973), he served as a key defensive component on a team that narrowly lost two Stanley Cup Finals series.

During his final season with the Blues in 1973–74, Angotti was hired as coach after Jean-Guy Talbot was fired with 23 games remaining in the season. He retired to serve as head coach on a full-time basis, but was fired just nine games into the next year. He returned to play hockey with the Chicago Cougars of the World Hockey Association (WHA). Angotti again served as head coach during the 1983–84 season, this time with the Pittsburgh Penguins.

Angotti also coached the New Brunswick Hawks, Erie Blades, and Baltimore Skipjacks of the American Hockey League (AHL) for one season each.

== Later life ==
Following his playing career, Angotti was a color commentator for Chicago Blackhawks games on WSNS-TV and WCFL radio. He was first inducted into the Michigan Tech Sports Hall of Fame in 1991 as an individual player. He was enshrined again in 2012 together with the 1962 team on the 50th anniversary of the school's first NCAA title. He periodically participated in community activities by the Chicago Blackhawk Alumni Association.

Angotti died on September 15, 2021, at Holy Cross Hospital in Fort Lauderdale, Florida. He was 83 years old.

== Career statistics ==
=== Regular season and playoffs ===
			Regular season					Playoffs
Season	Team	League	GP	G	A	Pts	PIM	GP	G	A	Pts	PIM
1955–56	St. Michael's Majors	OHA	6	6	12	29	8	4	0	4	20
1956–57	St. Michael's Majors	OHA	52	12	19	31	28	4	1	2	3	4
1957–58	St. Michael's Majors	OHA	52	23	19	42	72	9	7	8	15	10
1958–59	Michigan Tech University	NCAA Ind	5	10	9	19	—	—	—	—	—	—
1959–60	Michigan Tech University	NCAA Ind	30	18	21	39	30	—	—	—	—	—
1960–61	Michigan Tech University	NCAA Ind	28	25	17	42	52	—	—	—	—	—
1961–62	Michigan Tech University	NCAA Ind	31	28	23	51	50	—	—	—	—	—
1962–63	Kitchener-Waterloo Tigers	OHA Sr	16	19	7	26	26	—	—	—	—	—
1962–63	Rochester Americans	AHL	39	16	15	31	19	1	0	0	0	0
1963–64	Rochester Americans	AHL	60	15	30	45	28	2	1	1	2	0
1964–65	New York Rangers	NHL	70	9	8	17	20	—	—	—	—	—
1965–66	New York Rangers	NHL	21	2	2	4	2	—	—	—	—	—
1965–66	Chicago Black Hawks	NHL	30	4	10	14	12	6	0	0	0	2
1965–66	St. Louis Braves	CHL	8	10	8	18	4	—	—	—	—	—
1966–67	Chicago Black Hawks	NHL	63	6	12	18	4	6	2	1	3	2
1967–68	Philadelphia Flyers	NHL	70	12	37	49	35	7	0	0	0	2
1968–69	Pittsburgh Penguins	NHL	71	17	20	37	36	—	—	—	—	—
1969–70	Chicago Black Hawks	NHL	70	12	26	38	25	8	0	0	0	0
1970–71	Chicago Black Hawks	NHL	65	9	16	25	19	16	3	3	6	9
1971–72	Chicago Black Hawks	NHL	65	5	10	15	23	6	0	0	0	0
1972–73	Chicago Black Hawks	NHL	77	15	22	37	26	16	3	4	7	2
1973–74	St. Louis Blues	NHL	51	12	23	35	9	—	—	—	—	—
1974–75	Chicago Cougars	WHA	26	2	5	7	9	—	—	—	—	—
WHA totals			26	2	5	7	9	—	—	—	—	—
NHL totals			653	103	186	289	228	65	8	8	16	17

== Coaching record ==
Team	Year	Regular season						Post season
Team	Year	G	W	L	T	Pts	Division rank	Result
St. Louis Blues	1973–74	23	4	15	4	64	6th in West	Missed playoffs
St. Louis Blues	1974–75	9	2	5	2	84	2nd in Smythe	Fired
Pittsburgh Penguins	1983–84	80	16	58	6	38	6th in Patrick	Missed playoffs
NHL totals		112	22	78	12			

== Awards and honors ==
Award	Year
All-NCAA All-Tournament First Team	1960, 1962
All-WCHA Second Team	1960–61
All-WCHA First Team	1961–62
AHCA West All-American	1961–62

Awards and achievements
Preceded by Award Created	WCHA Sophomore of the Year; 1959–60 With George Kirkwood	Succeeded by Jack Wilson
Preceded by Reg Morelli; Bill Masterton	NCAA Tournament Most Outstanding Player; 1960 With Bob Marquis & Barry Urbanski; 1962	Succeeded by Bill Masterton; Al McLean
Preceded by Position created	Philadelphia Flyers captain 1967–68	Succeeded by Ed Van Impe
Preceded by Jean-Guy Talbot	Head coach of the St. Louis Blues; 1974	Succeeded by Lynn Patrick
Preceded by Eddie Johnston	Head coach of the Pittsburgh Penguins; 1983–84	Succeeded by Bob Berry
