= Middlebury Panthers men's ice hockey =

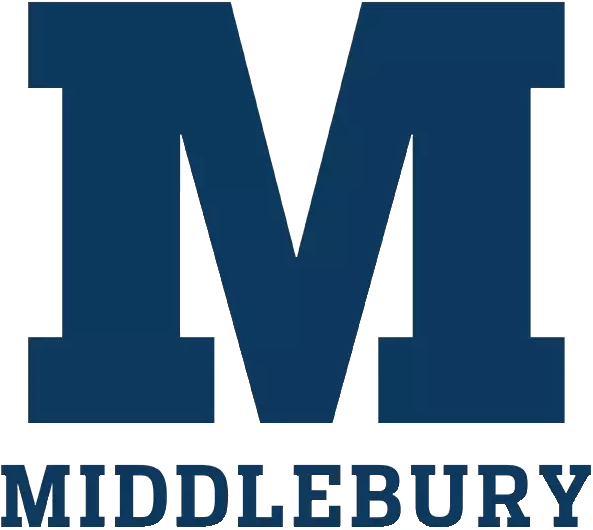
- University: Middlebury College
- Conference: NESCAC
- Head coach: Jack Ceglarski; 3rd season, 21–26–5 (.452)
- Arena: Kenyon Arena; Middlebury, Vermont
- Colors: Blue and white

NCAA tournament champions
- DIII: 1995, 1996, 1997, 1998, 1999, 2004, 2005, 2006

NCAA tournament runner-up
- DIII: 2007

NCAA tournament Frozen Four
- DIII: 1995, 1996, 1997, 1998, 1999, 2002, 2003, 2004, 2005, 2006, 2007

NCAA tournament appearances
- DIII: 1995, 1996, 1997, 1998, 1999, 2000, 2001, 2002, 2003, 2004, 2005, 2006, 2007, 2010

Conference tournament champions
- ECAC 2: 1979; ECAC East: 1991; NESCAC: 2000, 2001, 2002, 2004, 2005, 2006, 2007, 2010

The Middlebury Panthers men's ice hockey team represents Middlebury College in men’s hockey. They have played since 1922, with the exception of a few years during World War II. The Panthers currently play at the Division III and have won eight championships at that level, the most of any D-III program. For a time the team did play at the top level of college hockey, but when men's ice hockey divided into separate tiers in the mid-1960s, Middlebury left the upper echelon.

== History ==
Middlebury played as an Independent program, as all schools did officially, prior to 1950 but the Panthers were a founding member of the NCAA's first ice hockey conference, the Tri-State League. The Panthers remained in the conference for nine years but through most of that time they were pushed around by the national powers Clarkson, Rensselaer and St. Lawrence. Towards the end of their tenure in the conference, however, Middlebury did land a recruit who would rewrite the NCAA record book.

Phil Latreille joined the Panthers in 1957 and began playing immediately. Normally, freshmen did not play for varsity squads as the NCAA only allowed players eligibility for three seasons. However, because Middlebury wasn't in contention for the national tournament, they could ignore that NCAA regulation. Latreille scored 36 goals in only 20 games in his first year then set a new single-season record with 57 goals as a sophomore. For his third season, Latreille shattered his record with 77 goals and capped that off with a senior season of 80 goals and 108 points. No other player in NCAA history has even scored 60 goals in a season. Latreille held the points record for 24 years before being surpassed by Bill Watson, who played in more than twice as many games in his record-breaking campaign. Latreille still holds the NCAA record for career goals at 250 with second a distant 94 goals behind (Chuck Delich). Latreille's scoring exploits were so spectacular that he was able to parley them into a brief appearance with the New York Rangers after graduating. While he didn't stick in the National Hockey League, Latreille remains Middlebury's only alumnus to play in the NHL.

After Latreille left, Middlebury became one of the 28 founding members of ECAC Hockey, remaining with the conference for three seasons. By the end of the 1963–64 season it was obvious that ECAC Hockey had to make a change and the conference divided itself into upper- and lower-tiers. This was the first formal delineation of men's ice hockey and Middlebury was one of the 14 teams that founded ECAC 2. The Panthers played well under Wendall Forbes and typically finished in the top half of the conference. In 1971 Middlebury was again a founding member of a conference, this time for the NESCAC, though because the new conference didn't sponsor ice hockey as a varsity sport the Panthers remained with ECAC 2.

By the mid-1970s ECAC 2 had become just as ungainly as ECAC Hockey had been, boasting 31 programs by 1977. Rather than split into separate conferences, ECAC 2 divided itself into East and West Divisions with both playing separate postseason tournaments. Middlebury won its first conference tournament in 1979 but because NESCAC rules prohibited them from participating in any national tournament the Panthers didn't receive an invitation to the 1979 Championship.

When the NCAA instituted numerical classifications in 1973, Middlebury became a Division III school but the ice hockey program played at the Division II level. This continued for a decade until the NCAA instituted a Division III Championship and, while the Panthers could not participate in the tournament, most of their contemporaries were able to play in the championship. As a result, almost the entire D-II level dropped down to the lower tier with Middlebury going along. During the change, ECAC 2 formally split and Middlebury helped found yet another ice hockey conference, this one being called ECAC East.

In the mid-'80s Forbes stepped down and was replaced by Bill Beaney. It took Beaney a short time to rebuild the program and five years after he took over the Panthers won both the conference regular season and tournament titles. In 1994 the NESCAC changed its rules to permit its member teams to play in one postseason tournament, either conference or national, and a year later Middlebury made its first appearance in the Division III championship. Middlebury jumped in with both feet and won each of their games, including the championship over #1-ranked Fredonia State to capture the school's first national title in any sport. Beaney kept the panthers at the top of Division III and won five consecutive national championships (1995–1999), setting an NCAA record for any level of play.

Middlebury's championship streak ended in 2000, the same year that the NESCAC began to sponsor ice hockey as a sport and Middlebury joined 8 other schools to form the new conference. The NESCAC also allowed their member schools to play in both the conference and national tournaments beginning in 2000. This allowed the Panthers to play in their first conference tournament in 5 years and win their first of three consecutive titles. Beaney took a sabbatical in 2003 but returned the year after to lead Middlebury to three consecutive titles for a total of 8. The team was in contention for a ninth championship in 2007 but fell to Oswego State in overtime. The program slowly declined after its first championship loss. In 2015, Bill Beaney retired and Neil Sinclair took over as head coach. After several dispappointing seasons, he was replaced with Jack Ceglarski as head coach in 2023. In the 2024–25 season, the Panthers posted their first winning season since Beaney's 2012–13 squad.

== Season-by-season results ==
This is a partial list of Middlebury's record. It covers the time from when Middlebury restarted the ice hockey program after World War II until the program officially left the top tier of men's ice hockey.

Note: GP = Games played, W = Wins, L = Losses, T = Ties

NCAA D-I Champions	NCAA Frozen Four	Conference Regular Season Champions	Conference Playoff Champions

Season	Conference	Regular Season (Note: Code explanation; GP—Games Played, W—Wins, L—Losses, T—Tied games, Pts—Points*)											Conference Tournament Results	National Tournament Results
Season	Conference	Conference						Overall					Conference Tournament Results	National Tournament Results
Season	Conference	GP	W	L	T	Pts*	Finish	GP	W	L	T	%	Conference Tournament Results	National Tournament Results
Duke Nelson (1946–1964)
1946–47	Independent	–	–	–	–	–	–	10	7	2	1	.750		
1947–48	Independent	–	–	–	–	–	–	16	10	5	1	.656		
1948–49	Independent	–	–	–	–	–	–	10	6	4	0	.600		
1949–50	Independent	–	–	–	–	–	–	21	11	10	0	.524		
1950–51	Tri-State League	5	4	1	0	8	T–1st †	15	13	2	0	.867	Lost Tie-Breaker, 3–16 (Clarkson)	
1951–52	Tri-State League	7	2	5	0	4	4th	21	10	11	0	.476		
1952–53	Tri-State League	3	0	3	0	0	4th	16	10	6	0	.625		
1953–54	Tri-State League	4	0	4	0	0	4th	17	9	8	0	.529		
1954–55	Tri-State League	6	1	5	0	2	T–3rd	21	12	9	0	.571		
1955–56	Tri-State League	6	0	6	0	0	4th	21	10	11	0	.476		
1956–57	Tri-State League	6	0	6	0	0	4th	22	11	11	0	.500		
1957–58	Tri-State League	3	1	2	0	4	3rd	21	15	6	0	.714		
1958–59	Tri-State League	3	0	3	0	0	4th	20	11	8	1	.575		
1959–60	Independent	–	–	–	–	–	–	23	16	7	0	.696		
1960–61	Independent	–	–	–	–	–	–	21	19	2	0	.905		
1961–62	ECAC Hockey	19	8	8	1	.500	15th	22	11	9	2	.545		
1962–63	ECAC Hockey	17	7	10	0	.412	18th	22	10	12	0	.455		
1963–64	ECAC Hockey	20	4	16	0	.200	T–26th	23	4	19	0	.174		

* Winning percentage is used when conference schedules are unbalanced.
† Middlebury tied Clarkson for the best record in the conference. The two then played a single game to determine the sole champion for the Tri-State League.

== All-time coaching records ==
As of completion of 2018–19 season

Tenure	Coach	Years	Record	Pct.
1922–1924	Erwin Drost	2	0–9–1	.050
1924–1925	John Leary	1	1–1–0	.500
1925–1926	William McLaughlin	1	5–3–0	.625
1926–1928	Carleton Simmons	2	13–1–0	.929
1928–1929	Roy Clogston	1	6–3–0	.667
1929–1932	Richard Phelan	3	16–8–1	.660
1932–1936, 1946–1964	Duke Nelson	22	207–166–6	.554
1936–1940	John Nash	4	15–22–3	.413
1940–1942	George Ackerstrom	2	9–16–3	.375
1942–1943	George Phinny	1	3–10–0	.231
1964–1986	Wendall Forbes	22	262–226–19	.536
1986–2002, 2003–2015	Bill Beaney	28	516–184–51	.721
2002–2003, 2015–Present	Neil Sinclair	5	45–65–18	.422
Totals	13 coaches	94 Seasons	1097–720–103	.598

== Olympians ==
This is a list of Middlebury alumni were a part of an Olympic team.

Name	Position	Middlebury Tenure	Team	Year	Finish
Dates Fryberger	Center	1959–1963	(United States) USA	1964	5th
