= George Cuculick =

American ice hockey player

- Born: 1935 Barrie, Ontario, Canada
- Height: 5 ft 8 in (173 cm)
- Weight: 170 lb (77 kg; 12 st 2 lb)
- Position: Goaltender
- Played for: Michigan Tech; Minneapolis Millers (IHL)
- Playing career: 1957–1960

George Cuculick was an American ice hockey goaltender who was an All-American for Michigan Tech.

== Career ==
Cuculick played for his home-town junior team, the Barrie Flyers. In 1953 he helped the Flyers win the Memorial Cup along with future NHLers Don McKenney, Doug Mohns and Orval Tessier. In 1956 Cuculick was a member of the first recruiting class for John MacInnes at Michigan Tech. After a year with the freshman squad, he became a three-year starter for the Huskies and helped lead them back to the NCAA Tournament in his senior season. He was named as an All-American that season and made the inaugural All-WCHA Second Team. In the 1960 Tournament Cuculick led the Huskies past St. Lawrence with a dominant 13–3 victory. In the championship game, MTC was the equal of Denver for much of the game but the Pioneers pulled ahead late and denied Michigan Tech their first championship.

After graduating, Cuculick played briefly with the Minneapolis Millers before retiring as a player. He was inducted into the Michigan Tech Athletic Hall of Fame in 1998.

== Statistics ==
=== Regular season and playoffs ===
			Regular season									Playoffs
Season	Team	League	GP	W	L	T	MIN	GA	SO	GAA	SV%	GP	W	L	MIN	GA	SO	GAA	SV%
1957–58	Michigan Tech	WIHL	26	—	—	—	—	—	—	3.20	.889	—	—	—	—	—	—	—	—
1958–59	Michigan Tech	NCAA	20	—	—	—	—	—	—	3.15	.889	—	—	—	—	—	—	—	—
1959–60	Michigan Tech	WCHA	30	—	—	—	—	—	—	3.26	.889	—	—	—	—	—	—	—	—
1960–61	Minneapolis Millers	IHL	11	—	—	—	—	45	0	4.09	—	—	—	—	—	—	—	—	—
NCAA totals			76	41	32	2	4,570	246	—	3.23	.890	—	—	—	—	—	—	—	—

== Awards and honors ==
Award	Year
All-WCHA Second Team	1959–60
AHCA West All-American	1959–60
