= Stefano Coppa =

Italian engraver

Stefano Coppa was an Italian engraver, active in Rome c. 1776. In conjunction with Giuseppe Perini and Francesco Pozzi, he executed the plates from the antique statues in the Clementine Gallery of the Vatican. He also engraved a print of the Ascension after Giovanni Lanfranco.
