= NCAA Division I men's ice hockey tournament Most Outstanding Player =

College ice hockey award

Tournament Most Outstanding Player
- Sport: Ice hockey
- Awarded for: To the player who is judged to be the most outstanding player over the course of the NCAA tournament

History
- First award: 1948
- Most recent: Johnny Hicks, Denver

The tournament Most Outstanding Player is an annual award given out at the conclusion of the NCAA men's ice hockey championship to the player to be judged the most outstanding. The award has been in effect since the adoption of a national championship tournament for the 1947–48 season.

== History ==
In recent years the award has usually gone to the most outstanding player of the team that won the Division I NCAA Tournament. During the first five years of the tournament the most outstanding player did not come from the winning squad, but since 1953 the MOP has not been on the victorious team in only three years (1955, 1960 and 1985). Only two players have been named MOP more than once (Lou Angotti and Marc Behrend), but neither was able to do so in consecutive years. In 1960 the MOP was awarded to multiple players for the first time when it was awarded to three separate people, none of whom played for the National Champion. It has not been awarded to more than one player in a single year since.

The 2020 tournament was cancelled due to the COVID-19 pandemic, as a result no tournament Most Outstanding Player was awarded.

== Award winners ==
Year	Winner	Position	School
1948	Joe Riley*	Forward	Dartmouth
1949	Dick Desmond*	Goaltender	Dartmouth
1950	Ralph Bevins*	Goaltender	Boston University
1951	Donald Whiston*	Goaltender	Brown
1952	Ken Kinsley*	Goaltender	Colorado College
1953	John Matchefts	Center	Michigan
1954	Abbie Moore	Center	Rensselaer
1955	Phil Hilton*	Defenceman	Colorado College
1956	Lorne Howes	Goaltender	Michigan
1957	Bob McCusker	Left wing	Colorado College
1958	Murray Massier	Center	Denver
1959	Reg Morelli	Forward	North Dakota
1960	Lou Angotti*	Right wing	Michigan Tech
1960	Bob Marquis*	Center	Boston University
1960	Barry Urbanski*	Goaltender	Boston University
1961	Bill Masterton	Center	Denver
1962	Lou Angotti	Right wing	Michigan Tech
1963	Al McLean	Center	North Dakota
1964	Bob Gray	Goaltender	Michigan
1965	Gary Milroy	Center	Michigan Tech
1966	Gaye Cooley	Goaltender	Michigan State
1967	Skip Stanowski	Defenceman	Cornell
1968	Gerry Powers	Goaltender	Denver
1969	Keith Magnuson	Defenceman	Denver
1970	Dan Lodboa	Defenceman	Cornell
1971	Dan Brady	Goaltender	Boston University
1972	Tim Regan	Goaltender	Boston University

Note: * Recipient did not play for the National Champion

Year	Winner	Position	School
1973	Dean Talafous	Right wing	Wisconsin
1974	Brad Shelstad	Goaltender	Minnesota
1975	Jim Warden	Goaltender	Michigan Tech
1976	Tom Vannelli	Center	Minnesota
1977	Julian Baretta	Goaltender	Wisconsin
1978	Jack O'Callahan	Defenceman	Boston University
1979	Steve Janaszak	Goaltender	Minnesota
1980	Doug Smail	Right wing	North Dakota
1981	Marc Behrend	Goaltender	Wisconsin
1982	Phil Sykes	Left wing	North Dakota
1983	Marc Behrend	Goaltender	Wisconsin
1984	Gary Kruzich	Goaltender	Bowling Green
1985	Chris Terreri*	Goaltender	Providence
1986	Mike Donnelly	Left wing	Michigan State
1987	Tony Hrkac	Center	North Dakota
1988	Bruce Hoffort	Goaltender	Lake Superior State
1989	Ted Donato	Left wing	Harvard
1990	Chris Tancill	Right wing	Wisconsin
1991	Scott Beattie	Center	Northern Michigan
1992	Paul Constantin	Left wing	Lake Superior State
1993	Jim Montgomery	Center	Maine
1994	Sean Tallaire	Right wing	Lake Superior State
1995	Chris O'Sullivan	Forward	Boston University
1996	Brendan Morrison	Center	Michigan
1997	Matt Henderson	Left wing	North Dakota
1998	Marty Turco	Goaltender	Michigan
1999	Alfie Michaud	Goaltender	Maine

Year	Winner	Position	School
2000	Lee Goren	Right wing	North Dakota
2001	Chuck Kobasew	Right wing	Boston College
2002	Grant Potulny	Center	Minnesota
2003	Thomas Vanek	Right wing	Minnesota
2004	Adam Berkhoel	Goaltender	Denver
2005	Peter Mannino	Goaltender	Denver
2006	Robbie Earl	Left wing	Wisconsin
2007	Justin Abdelkader	Left wing	Michigan State
2008	Nathan Gerbe	Left wing	Boston College
2009	Colby Cohen	Defenceman	Boston University
2010	Ben Smith	Right wing	Boston College
2011	J. T. Brown	Right wing	Minnesota–Duluth
2012	Parker Milner	Goaltender	Boston College
2013	Andrew Miller	Center	Yale
2014	Shayne Gostisbehere	Defenceman	Union
2015	Jon Gillies	Goaltender	Providence
2016	Drake Caggiula	Forward	North Dakota
2017	Jarid Lukosevicius	Right wing	Denver
2018	Karson Kuhlman	Center	Minnesota–Duluth
2019	Parker Mackay	Right wing	Minnesota Duluth
2020	Cancelled due to the coronavirus pandemic		
2021	Bobby Trivigno	Forward	Massachusetts
2022	Michael Benning	Defenceman	Denver
2023	Jacob Quillan	Forward	Quinnipiac
2024	Matt Davis	Goaltender	Denver
2025	Owen Michaels	Forward	Western Michigan
2026	Johnny Hicks	Goaltender	Denver

== Award breakdown ==
Winners by school
School	Winners
Denver	10
Boston University	8
North Dakota	8
Wisconsin	6
Michigan	5
Minnesota	5
Boston College	4
Michigan Tech	4
Colorado College	3
Lake Superior State	3
Michigan State	3
Minnesota–Duluth	3
Cornell	2
Dartmouth	2
Maine	2
Providence	2
Bowling Green	1
Brown	1
Harvard	1
Massachusetts	1
Northern Michigan	1
Quinnipiac	1
Rensselaer	1
Union	1
Western Michigan	1
Yale	1

Winners by position
Position	Winners
Center	15
Right wing	13
Left wing	9
Forward	7
Defenceman	8
Goaltender	28
