= 1960 WCHA men's ice hockey tournament =

1960 WCHA Men's ice hockey tournament
- Dates: March 11–12, 1960
- Teams: 4
- Finals site: Dee Stadium; Houghton, Michigan; DU Arena; Denver, Colorado
- Champions: Michigan Tech† (1st title); Denver‡ (1st title)
- Winning coach: John MacInnes (1st title); Murray Armstrong (1st title)
- WCHA Men's Ice Hockey Tournaments

The 1960 WCHA Men's Ice Hockey Tournament was the 1st conference playoff in league history. Additionally it is the first conference tournament ever held for an American college ice hockey conference. The tournament was played between March 11 and March 12, 1960. All games were played at home team campus sites. By being declared as co-champions, both Michigan Tech and Denver were invited to participate in the 1960 NCAA Men's Ice Hockey Tournament.

Though not official designations, Michigan Tech is considered as the East Regional Champion† and Denver as the West Regional Champion‡.

== Format ==
The top four teams in the WCHA, based upon the conference regular season standings, were eligible for the tournament and were seeded No. 1 through No. 4. In the first round the first and fourth seeds and the second and third seeds were matched in two-game series where the team with the higher number of goals scored was declared the winner. Rather than decide upon a single tournament champion, the WCHA declared the winners of the two series as co-tournament champions.

=== Conference standings ===
Note: GP = Games played; W = Wins; L = Losses; T = Ties; PCT = Winning percentage; GF = Goals for; GA = Goals against

1959–60 Western Collegiate Hockey Association standings
	Conference							Overall					
	GP	W	L	T	PCT	GF	GA	GP	W	L	T	GF	GA
Denver†*	22	17	4	1	.795	128	55	34	27	4	3	204	88
Michigan Tech*	22	15	6	1	.705	107	72	32	21	10	1	152	107
North Dakota	22	14	7	1	.659	93	80	32	19	11	2	157	115
Colorado College	20	8	12	0	.400	72	101	26	8	17	1	87	146
Michigan	18	7	11	0	.389	63	71	24	12	12	0	97	81
Minnesota	24	8	15	1	.354	102	109	27	9	16	2	111	121
Michigan State	24	4	18	2	.208	54	130	24	4	18	2	54	130
Championship: Michigan Tech, Denver † indicates conference regular season champion * indicates conference tournament champion

== Bracket ==
Finals; March 11–12
1	Denver	9	3
4	Colorado College	2	1
2	Michigan Tech	4	5
3	North Dakota	3	4

Note: * denotes overtime period(s)

=== Finals ===
==== (1) Denver vs. (4) Colorado College ====
March 11	Denver	9 – 2	Colorado College	DU Arena

March 12	Denver	3 – 1	Colorado College	DU Arena

Denver won series 12–3

==== (2) Michigan Tech vs. (3) North Dakota ====
March 11	Michigan Tech	4 – 3	North Dakota	Dee Stadium

March 12	Michigan Tech	5 – 4	North Dakota	Dee Stadium

Michigan Tech won series 9–7

== Tournament awards ==
- None

== See also ==
- Western Collegiate Hockey Association men's champions
- 1960 NCAA Men's Ice Hockey Tournament
