= Paul Coppo =

American ice hockey player (1938–2022)

- Born: November 2, 1938 Hancock, Michigan, U.S.
- Died: June 2, 2022 (aged 83) De Pere, Wisconsin, U.S.
- Height: 5 ft 11 in (180 cm)
- Weight: 170 lb (77 kg; 12 st 2 lb)
- Position: Center
- Shot: Left
- National team: United States
- Playing career: 1957–1971

Paul Francis "Racket" Coppo Jr. (November 2, 1938 – June 2, 2022) was an American ice hockey player. He was a member of the United States's 1964 Winter Olympics team. He would go on to play with the Green Bay Bobcats of the United States Hockey League. He was inducted into the United States Hockey Hall of Fame in 2004.

== Awards and honors ==
Award	Year
All-WCHA Second Team	1959–60
AHCA West All-American	1959–60
All-NCAA All-Tournament First Team	1960
