= 1965–66 NCAA College Division men's ice hockey season =

- Duration: November 1965– March, 1966
- NCAA tournament: 1966

The 1965–66 NCAA College Division men's ice hockey season began in November 1965 and concluded in March of the following year. This was the 2nd season of second-tier college ice hockey.

== Regular season ==
=== Season tournaments ===
Tournament	Dates	Teams	Champion
Amherst College Tournament	December 18–20		
Yankee Conference Tournament	December 28–29	4	New Hampshire
MIT Tournament		4	Connecticut
Codfish Bowl		4	Boston State

=== Standings ===
1965–66 ECAC 2 standings
	Conference							Overall					
	GP	W	L	T	Pct.	GF	GA	GP	W	L	T	GF	GA
American International †	15	11	4	0	.733	104	39	24	14	10	0		
Bowdoin	13	9	3	1	.731	74	41	20	11	8	1	96	82
Williams	14	10	4	0	.714	75	52	20	12	8	0		
New Hampshire	16	11	5	0	.688	102	52	23	11	12	0	112	94
Colby *	12	8	4	0	.667	70	42	26	13	12	1	113	112
Middlebury	12	7	5	0	.583	59	34	24	12	12	0	100	91
Vermont	15	8	7	0	.533	69	84	19	8	11	0	78	100
Merrimack	9	4	4	1	.500	33	31	19	8	10	1	64	71
Hamilton	12	6	6	0	.500	47	62	15	4	11	0		
Amherst	13	5	8	0	.385	46	63	17	7	10	0		
Norwich	18	6	12	0	.333	64	112	22	7	15	0	77	132
Connecticut	15	5	10	0	.333	49	120	21	10	11	0	111	143
Massachusetts	16	2	14	0	.125	61	98	19	3	16	0	69	126
MIT	6	0	6	0	.000	10	38	17	4	13	0		
Championship: March 12, 1966 † indicates conference regular season champion * indicates conference tournament champion

1965–66 NCAA College Division Independent ice hockey standings
	Overall record					
	GP	W	L	T	GF	GA
Babson	10	5	5	0		
Boston State	20	20	0	0		
Lake Forest	9	7	2	0		
Nichols	15	9	6	0		
Oberlin						
RIT	20	15	5	0		
Salem State	15	11	4	0		
St. Cloud State	14	4	10	0	59	47
St. Olaf	17	5	12	0	–	–

1965–66 Minnesota Intercollegiate Athletic Conference ice hockey standings
	Conference							Overall					
	GP	W	L	T	Pts	GF	GA	GP	W	L	T	GF	GA
Gustavus Adolphus †	14	12	2	0	24			18	16	2	0		
Saint Mary's	14	11	3	0	22			17	13	4	0		
Augsburg	14	11	3	0	22			15	12	3	0		
Concordia (MN)	14	0	14	0	0			16	1	15	0		
St. Thomas								16	8	8	0		
Saint John's								17	9	8	0		
Macalester													
Hamline													
† indicates conference regular season champion

== See also ==
- 1965–66 NCAA University Division men's ice hockey season
