= 1960 NCAA men's ice hockey tournament =

College ice hockey tournament

- Teams: 4
- Finals site: Boston Arena, Boston, Massachusetts
- Champions: Denver Pioneers (2nd title)
- Runner-up: Michigan Tech Huskies (2nd title game)
- Semifinalists: Boston University Terriers (4th Frozen Four); St. Lawrence Saints (5th Frozen Four)
- Winning coach: Murray Armstrong (2nd title)
- MOP: Lou Angotti (Michigan Tech); Bob Marquis (Boston University); Barry Urbanski (Boston University)

The 1960 NCAA Men's Ice Hockey Tournament was the culmination of the 1959–60 NCAA men's ice hockey season, the 13th such tournament in NCAA history. It was held between March 17 and 19, 1960, and concluded with Denver defeating Michigan Tech 5–3. All games were played at the Boston Arena in Boston, Massachusetts.

This was the last tournament to include an independent school until 1988.

== Qualifying teams ==
Four teams qualified for the tournament, two each from the eastern and western regions. The WCHA tournament co-champions received automatic bids into the tournament. The two at-large bids that were available to eastern teams were conferred to the winners of two separate playoff games between the four teams judged to be the best at the conclusion of the regular season. The games were played at the home venue of the higher seed. Neither of these games are considered to be part of the NCAA tournament but are included here for continuity.

Playoff; March 11–12
1	St. Lawrence	4
4	Boston College	3
2	Boston University	4
3	Dartmouth	1

East							West						
Seed	School	Conference	Record	Berth type	Appearance	Last bid	Seed	School	Conference	Record	Berth type	Appearance	Last bid
1	St. Lawrence	Tri-State League	14–6–2	Playoff	5th	1959	1	Denver	WCHA	25–4–3	Tournament co-champion	2nd	1958
2	Boston University	Independent	17–8–0	Playoff	4th	1953	2	Michigan Tech	WCHA	20–9–1	Tournament co-champion	2nd	1956

== Format ==
The higher-ranked eastern team was seeded as the top eastern team while the WCHA champion with the better conference record was given the top western seed. The second eastern seed was slotted to play the top western seed and vice versa. All games were played at the Boston Arena. All matches were Single-game eliminations with the semifinal winners advancing to the national championship game and the losers playing in a consolation game.

== Bracket ==
Semifinals; March 17–18
E1	St. Lawrence	3
W2	Michigan Tech	13
W1	Denver	6
E2	Boston University	4

National Championship; March 19
W2	Michigan Tech	3
W1	Denver	5
Third Place Game
E1	St. Lawrence	6
E2	Boston University	7

Note: * denotes overtime period(s)

=== Semifinals ===
==== St. Lawrence vs. Michigan Tech ====
March 17	St. Lawrence	3 – 13	Michigan Tech	Boston Arena	Recap
No scoring		First period	05:04 - Lou Angotti (unassisted)
(unassisted) Terry Slater - 00:37		Second period	05:15 - Al Raymond (Farrell, Bourke); 11:09 - Lou Angotti (unassisted); 13:03 - GW - Gerry Fabbro (Kosiancic, Coppo); 15:30 - Gerry Sullivan (Lauriente); 16:43 - Gerry Fabbro (Coppo, Kosiancic); 17:08 - Paul Coppo (unassisted); 18:10 - Al Raymond (Bourke); 18:30 - Don Lauriente (Raymond)
(Slater, Anderson) Larry Langill - 06:18 (Brown) Jesse Sammis - 06:52		Third period	04:58 - Gerry Fabbro (Coppo, Kosiancic); 08:27 - John Kosiancic (Coppo); 10:30 - Tom Bourke (Akervell); 11:17 - Lou Angotti (Pascht)
(30 saves) Joe Sherin		Goalie stats	George Cuculick (19 saves)

==== Denver vs. Boston University ====
March 18	Denver	6 – 4	Boston University	Boston Arena	Recap
(Masterton) Jerry Walker - 05:20 (B. Walker, Williamson) Max Geisthardt - 11:48		First period	09:54 - Bob Marquis (unassisted); 18:33 - Bob Marquis (McCormack)
(MacMillan) Paul Josephson - 14:40		Second period	No scoring
(Josephson) Murray MacDonald - 01:45 (Howe) Paul Josephson - GW - 06:05 (Howe, Masterton) Con Collie - 16:19		Third period	09:20 - Dave MacLeod (unassisted); 15:23 - Bill McCormack (Quinn)
(18 saves) George Kirkwood		Goalie stats	Barry Urbanski (39 saves)

=== Consolation Game ===
==== St. Lawrence vs. Boston University ====
March 19	St. Lawrence	6 – 7	Boston University	Boston Arena	Recap
(Slater) Rollie Anderson - 09:33 (unassisted) Jesse Sammis - 11:45 (Slater, Anderson) Larry Langill - 15:30		First period	04:29 - Dave MacLeod (Jarasitis, Spinney); 19:25 - Bill McCormack (Goguen, Marquis)
No scoring		Second period	17:51 - Bob Marquis (McCormack, Quinn); 19:02 - Bill Quinn (McCurdy)
(Anderson, Slater) Larry Langill - 01:00 (unassisted) Ray Tessier - 03:33 (Slater) Larry Langill - 12:56		Third period	05:47 - Bill McCormack (Quinn, Marquis); 06:45 - Allen Jarasitis (Goguen); 09:35 - GW - Russ McCurdy (unassisted)
(40 saves) Joe Sherin		Goalie stats	Barry Urbanski (29 saves)

=== National Championship ===
==== Denver vs. Michigan Tech ====
March 19	Denver	5 – 3	Michigan Tech	Boston Arena	Recap

Scoring summary
Period	Team	Goal	Assist(s)	Time	Score
1st	DEN	Jerry Walker	Masterton and Collie	10:51	1–0 DEN
2nd	DEN	Grant Munro	Geisthardt	32:42	2–0 DEN
2nd	MTU	Paul Coppo – PP	Kosiancic	34:17	2–1 DEN
2nd	MTU	Jerry Sullivan	Pascht and Angotti	36:27	2–2
2nd	MTU	Gerald Fabbro	Kosiancic and Angotti	39:02	3–2 MTU
3rd	DEN	George Konik	unassisted	42:30	3–3
3rd	DEN	John MacMillan – GW	Howe	58:57	4–3 DEN
3rd	DEN	John MacMillan – EN	Walker	59:48	5–3 DEN
Penalty summary
Period	Team	Player	Penalty	Time	PIM
1st	MTU	Bob Hauswirth	Tripping	15:28	2:00
1st	DEN	George Konik	Hooking	16:25	2:00
1st	DEN	Con Collie	Tripping	18:51	2:00
2nd	DEN	John MacMillan	Holding	29:21	2:00
2nd	DEN	Jerry Walker	Hooking	33:27	2:00
3rd	DEN	Murray MacDonald	Illegal check	47:24	2:00

Shots by period
Team	1	2	3	T
Michigan Tech	6	16	6	28
Denver	7	9	12	28

Goaltenders
Team	Name	Saves	Goals against	Time on ice
MTU	George Cuculick	23	4	
DEN	George Kirkwood	25	3	

== All-Tournament Team ==
=== First Team ===
- G: Barry Urbanski* (Boston University)
- D: Marty Howe (Denver)
- D: George Konik (Denver)
- F: Lou Angotti* (Michigan Tech)
- F: Paul Coppo (Michigan Tech)
- F: Bob Marquis* (Boston University)

* Most Outstanding Player(s)

=== Second Team ===
- G: George Kirkwood (Denver)
- D: Henry Akervall (Michigan Tech)
- D: Pat Enright (Boston University)
- F: Terry Slater (St. Lawrence)
- F: John MacMillan (Denver)
- F: John Kosiancic (Michigan Tech)

== See also ==
- 1960 WCHA Men's Ice Hockey Tournament
