= John MacMillan (ice hockey) =

Canadian ice hockey player

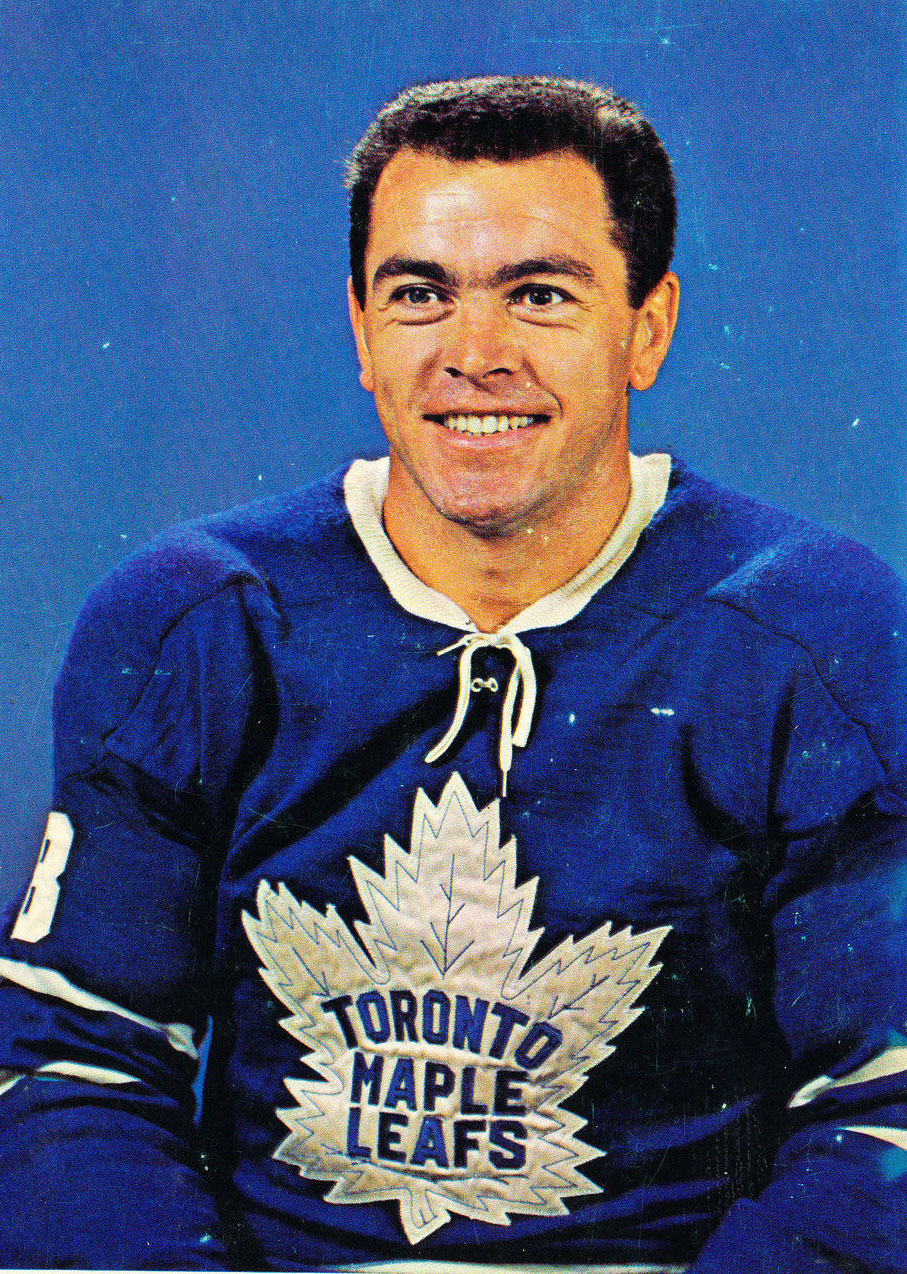
- Born: October 25, 1935 (age 90) Lethbridge, Alberta, Canada
- Height: 5 ft 10 in (178 cm)
- Weight: 185 lb (84 kg; 13 st 3 lb)
- Position: Right wing
- Shot: Left
- Played for: Toronto Maple Leafs; Detroit Red Wings
- Playing career: 1960–1971

John Stewart MacMillan (born October 25, 1935) is a Canadian retired ice hockey forward. He played 104 games in the National Hockey League with the Toronto Maple Leafs and Detroit Red Wings between 1960 and 1964. The rest of his career, which lasted from 1960 to 1971, was spent in various minor leagues.

== Playing career ==
MacMillan began his National Hockey League career with the Toronto Maple Leafs in 1960. He would also play with the Detroit Red Wings. Macmillan left the NHL following the 1965 season and retired from hockey altogether in 1971. He won 2 Stanley Cups with the Toronto Maple Leafs in 1962 and 1963.

MacMillan led the University of Denver to the NCAA Championships in 1958 and 1960.

== Post-playing career ==
After hockey, MacMillan was a licensed professional engineer working in the state of Tennessee. His Tennessee licence number was 9708.

== Career statistics ==
=== Regular season and playoffs ===
			Regular season					Playoffs
Season	Team	League	GP	G	A	Pts	PIM	GP	G	A	Pts	PIM
1952–53	Crows Nest Coalers	WCJHL	1	0	0	0	0	—	—	—	—	—
1953–54	Lethbridge Native Sons	WCJHL	28	5	9	14	12	4	0	0	0	2
1954–55	Lethbridge Native Sons	WCJHL	37	5	11	16	24	3	0	3	3	0
1955–56	Lethbridge Native Sons	WCJHL	45	27	27	54	34	9	4	6	10	6
1956–57	University of Denver	WCHA	—	—	—	—	—	—	—	—	—	—
1957–58	University of Denver	WCHA	37	19	12	31	50	—	—	—	—	—
1958–59	University of Denver	WCHA	28	16	25	41	32	—	—	—	—	—
1959–60	University of Denver	WCHA	34	30	25	55	34	—	—	—	—	—
1960–61	Toronto Maple Leafs	NHL	31	3	5	8	8	4	0	0	0	0
1960–61	Rochester Americans	AHL	38	8	7	15	14	—	—	—	—	—
1961–62	Pittsburgh Hornets	AHL	33	6	10	16	25	—	—	—	—	—
1961–62	Toronto Maple Leafs	NHL	31	1	0	1	8	3	0	0	0	0
1962–63	Toronto Maple Leafs	NHL	6	1	1	2	6	1	0	0	0	0
1962–63	Rochester Americans	AHL	57	22	23	45	37	—	—	—	—	—
1963–64	Toronto Maple Leafs	NHL	13	0	0	0	4	—	—	—	—	—
1963–64	Detroit Red Wings	NHL	20	0	3	3	6	4	0	1	1	2
1963–64	Pittsburgh Hornets	AHL	31	4	8	12	8	5	1	1	2	0
1964–65	Detroit Red Wings	NHL	3	0	1	1	0	—	—	—	—	—
1964–65	Memphis Wings	CPHL	61	17	20	37	43	—	—	—	—	—
1964–65	St. Paul Rangers	CPHL	3	0	0	0	6	—	—	—	—	—
1965–66	Memphis Wings	CPHL	64	12	14	26	29	—	—	—	—	—
1966–67	San Diego Gulls	WHL	71	20	26	46	76	—	—	—	—	—
1967–68	San Diego Gulls	WHL	72	12	32	44	61	7	0	0	0	4
1968–69	San Diego Gulls	WHL	74	22	38	60	55	7	3	0	3	4
1969–70	San Diego Gulls	WHL	71	19	48	67	35	6	4	3	7	0
1970–71	San Diego Gulls	WHL	72	12	23	35	31	6	0	0	0	2
WHL totals			360	85	167	252	258	26	7	3	10	10
NHL totals			104	5	10	15	32	12	0	1	1	2

== Awards and honors ==
Award	Year
NCAA All-Tournament Second Team	1958, 1960
All-WCHA Second Team	1959–60
