= 1957–58 Denver Pioneers men's ice hockey season =

Collegiate team season

National champion WIHL co-champion 1958 NCAA Tournament, champion
- Conference: T–1st WIHL
- Home ice: DU Arena

Record
- Overall: 24–10–2
- Conference: 12–10–0
- Home: 18–2–2
- Road: 4–8–0
- Neutral: 2–0–0

Coaches and captains
- Head coach: Murray Armstrong
- Captain: Ed Zemrau

The 1957–58 Denver Pioneers men's ice hockey team represented University of Denver in college ice hockey. In its 2nd year under head coach Murray Armstrong the team compiled a 24–10–2 record and reached the NCAA tournament for the first time. The Pioneers defeated North Dakota 6–2 in the championship game at the Williams Arena in Minneapolis, Minnesota, the first national title not held at the Broadmoor Ice Palace. Denver became the first team to win its inaugural championship appearance since Michigan in 1948, the first time the tournament was held.

== Season ==
When Murray Armstrong Arrived in 1956, the fairly new program at Denver had been declining for several years. This trend continued in Armstrong's first season when the Pioneers posted a losing record for the first time since their inaugural campaign. During that year, however, Armstrong brought in 9 recruits from Canada who played on the Freshman team before hitting the ice with the varsity squad in 1957–58. Among those players were Murray Massier, Jim Brown and future NHL-er John MacMillan. With those three forwards leading the way on offense Denver jumped out to an impressive start with 2-win weekends over Toronto, Michigan, Michigan State and Michigan Tech. Only arch-rival Colorado College was able to dent their record early-on, winning once in the first of four home-and-home series for the season. Denver suffered its first home loss on New Year's Day against Minnesota but won the rematch two days later to remain high in the conference standings with an 8–2 record.

After taking three points in a series against the US National Team Denver split its second series with CC before welcoming a pair on non-conference teams. The Pioneers defeated the Flin Flon Bombers, a junior team from Manitoba, twice by a combined score of 14–2 then utterly dominated Rensselaer 20–3 in the first game of a 2-game sweep. At the end of January Denver hit the road for a compressed road trip where they would play Minnesota and North Dakota twice each in the span of a week. That scheduling quirk turned out very badly for the Pioneers who lost all four games and dropped back to the rest of the pack with a 9–7 record, though they still held on to first place.

The Pioneers returned home to host two Canadian junior teams over a 10-day period, winning three times and tying once. During that two-week period Colorado College swept a series against North Dakota to jump up in the WIHL standings and claim a tie for the top spot with 14 points. That came just in time for the start to a four-game series between the two teams that could decide the second western qualifier for the NCAA Tournament. Each team would play two home games with CC winning the opening game at home 5–1. Because the teams were scheduled to play 8 times over the course of the season each game was worth only 1/2 point in the conference standings, meaning that Denver only had a possible 1-1/2 points possible remaining between the two teams and with little room for error the Pioneers rallied to take the next two games at home, winning 7–0 and 6–3. With the pioneers up by half a point the teams returned to Colorado Springs where, for the 8th time that season, the home team won. While Denver and CC were busy battling to no decisive effect, North Dakota had swept back-to-back weekends against Michigan State and Michigan Tech to put all three team in a tie for first in the WIHL.

Entering the final week of the season two of the three would be selected to play in the NCAA Tournament with 4th-place Minnesota too far behind to move up in the standings. While Denver was hosting North Dakota, Colorado College went on the road to face Minnesota. Denver took the first game against the Fighting Sioux while CC fell to the Golden Gophers 5–7. Even with a 1-point advantage it was still possible for both other teams to pass Denver in the standings so when the Pioneers were defeated by North Dakota for only their second home loss of the season they slipped to the #2 spot because UND had won 3 of the four matches between the two on the season. CC, meanwhile, had dueled Minnesota to a 1–1 tie in regulation but the tigers had to have a victory if they wanted a chance to defend their national title. However it was the Gophers who were able to earn the overtime marker and end the Tigers' season.

Denver went to Minnesota to play in their first national tournament, the first championship held outside of the state of Colorado. They were met in the first game by Tri-State League champion Clarkson who had limited opponents to 40 goals in their 18 games while averaging 4.5 goals per game. While Denver was making their national debut the 16-2 Golden Knights had finished 3rd in the previous tournament and were looking to build on an already stellar season. In the semifinal game, however, Clarkson was unable to hold back the Denver attack and surrendered 6 goals, the most they had allowed all season. Denver advanced to the title game to face North Dakota for the fifth time that season after the Fighting Sioux easily dispatched Harvard 9–1.

Despite the two teams' familiarity with one another the game started a bit slowly with UND's Ed Thomlinson scoring the only goal of the first period. It took more than seven minutes into the second before Denver was able to even the score at 1–1 but once they got onto the scoresheet the floodgates opened and the Pioneers scored twice more in less than four minutes. North Dakota regained their footing and held Denver back for the remainder of the period. With a 3–1 Denver advantage entering the third period the Pioneers pulled back and tried to protect their lead but just over five minutes in the lead was halved by Joe Poole who found himself open in front of the net. Murray Massier quickly responded with his 21st goal of the season to regain the 2-goal edge and while there was still plenty of time left the Massier marker appeared to sap the life out of the Fighting Sioux. While Denver only managed 5 shots in the final frame UND was limited to the same amount. To make matters worse North Dakota netminder Robert Peabody allowed three goals on those five shots to end the UND season on a whimper.

Massier was named tournament MOP and was joined by Jim Brown, Ed Zemrau and Rodney Schneck on the All-Tournament first team while Blair Livingstone, Barry Sharp and John MacMillan earned All-Tournament second team honors.

Senior Captain Ed Zemrau was the only Pioneer named to the AHCA All-American West Team and was named to the All-WIHL First Team while Massier made the WIHL second team.

Because the WIHL would be dissolved that summer due to a dispute over recruiting practices, Denver's first WIHL title was the last that would ever be awarded. This also made the '58 Denver team the last WIHL squad to win a national championship.

== Standings ==
1957–58 Western Intercollegiate Hockey League
	Conference								Overall					
	GP	W	L	T	PCT	PTS	GF	GA	GP	W	L	T	GF	GA
North Dakota†	20	15	5	0	.750	16	87	60	32	24	7	1	159	82
Denver†	22	12	10	0	.545	16	74	80	36	24	10	2	171	115
Colorado College	20	11	9	0	.550	15	97	74	30	17	12	1	170	116
Minnesota	24	13	11	0	.542	13	90	81	27	16	11	0	106	84
Michigan State	20	9	11	0	.450	10	57	68	23	12	11	0	98	73
Michigan	18	7	11	0	.389	9	53	63	21	8	13	0	61	73
Michigan Tech	20	5	15	0	.250	5	50	80	28	11	16	1	85	96
† indicates conference regular season champion Note: All games played between league members counted in the standings. When teams played each other twice, two points were awarded for a win, one for a tie. When teams met each other four times, one point was awarded for a win, one-half for a tie. When teams met eight times (Denver and CC), one-half point was awarded for a win, and one-fourth point for a tie.

== Schedule ==
Conference games against Minnesota and North Dakota were only worth 1 point in the standings. Conference games against Colorado College were only worth 1/2 point in the standings.

Date	Opponent	Site	Result	Record
Exhibition
November 30	vs. DU Hilltoppers*	DU Arena • Denver, Colorado	W 6–2	
Regular Season
December 6	vs. Toronto*	DU Arena • Denver, Colorado	W 4–3	1–0–0
December 10	vs. Toronto*	DU Arena • Denver, Colorado	W 6–1	2–0–0
December 13	vs. Colorado College	DU Arena • Denver, Colorado	W 6–4	3–0–0 (1–0–0)
December 14	at Colorado College	Broadmoor World Arena • Colorado Springs, Colorado	L 2–6	3–1–0 (1–1–0)
December 17	at Michigan	Weinberg Coliseum • Ann Arbor, Michigan	W 7–6	4–1–0 (2–1–0)
December 18	at Michigan	Weinberg Coliseum • Ann Arbor, Michigan	W 3–2 ^{OT}	5–1–0 (3–1–0)
December 20	at Michigan State	Demonstration Hall • East Lansing, Michigan	W 5–1	6–1–0 (4–1–0)
December 21	at Michigan State	Demonstration Hall • East Lansing, Michigan	W 4–2	7–1–0 (5–1–0)
December 27	vs. Michigan Tech	DU Arena • Denver, Colorado	W 3–0	8–1–0 (6–1–0)
December 30	vs. Michigan Tech	DU Arena • Denver, Colorado	W 6–2	9–1–0 (7–1–0)
January 1	vs. Minnesota	DU Arena • Denver, Colorado	L 1–2	9–2–0 (7–2–0)
January 3	vs. Minnesota	DU Arena • Denver, Colorado	W 4–2	10–2–0 (8–2–0)
January 7	vs. US National Team*	DU Arena • Denver, Colorado	T 4–1	10–2–1 (8–2–0)
January 10	vs. US National Team*	DU Arena • Denver, Colorado	W 5–3	11–2–1 (8–2–0)
January 13	at Colorado College	Broadmoor World Arena • Colorado Springs, Colorado	L 4–10	11–3–1 (8–3–0)
January 14	vs. Colorado College	DU Arena • Denver, Colorado	W 3–2 ^{OT}	12–3–1 (9–3–0)
January 17	vs. Flin Flon Bombers*	DU Arena • Denver, Colorado	W 7–0	13–3–1 (9–3–0)
January 20	vs. Flin Flon Bombers*	DU Arena • Denver, Colorado	W 7–2	14–3–1 (9–3–0)
January 24	vs. Rensselaer*	DU Arena • Denver, Colorado	W 20–3	15–3–1 (9–3–0)
January 25	vs. Rensselaer*	DU Arena • Denver, Colorado	W 4–2	16–3–1 (9–3–0)
January 31	at Minnesota	Williams Arena • Minneapolis, Minnesota	L 4–6	16–4–1 (9–4–0)
February 1	at Minnesota	Williams Arena • Minneapolis, Minnesota	L 0–4	16–5–1 (9–5–0)
February 3	at North Dakota	Winter Sports Building • Grand Forks, North Dakota	L 0–9	16–6–1 (9–6–0)
February 4	at North Dakota	Winter Sports Building • Grand Forks, North Dakota	L 1–2	16–7–1 (9–7–0)
February 7	vs. Prince Albert Mintos*	DU Arena • Denver, Colorado	W 9–3	17–7–1 (9–7–0)
February 8	vs. Prince Albert Mintos*	DU Arena • Denver, Colorado	T 2–2	17–7–2 (9–7–0)
February 14	vs. Edmonton Oil Kings*	DU Arena • Denver, Colorado	W 6–4	18–7–2 (9–7–0)
February 18	vs. Edmonton Oil Kings*	DU Arena • Denver, Colorado	W 4–3	19–7–2 (9–7–0)
February 21	at Colorado College	Broadmoor World Arena • Colorado Springs, Colorado	L 1–5	19–8–2 (9–8–0)
February 22	vs. Colorado College	DU Arena • Denver, Colorado	W 7–0	20–8–2 (10–8–0)
February 28	vs. Colorado College	DU Arena • Denver, Colorado	W 6–3	21–8–2 (11–8–0)
March 1	at Colorado College	Broadmoor World Arena • Colorado Springs, Colorado	L 2–5	21–9–2 (11–9–0)
March 5	vs. North Dakota	DU Arena • Denver, Colorado	W 4–3	22–9–2 (12–9–0)
March 7	vs. North Dakota	DU Arena • Denver, Colorado	L 1–4	22–10–2 (12–10–0)
NCAA Tournament
March 13	vs. Clarkson*	Williams Arena • Minneapolis, Minnesota (National Semifinal)	W 6–2	23–10–2 (12–10–0)
March 15	vs. North Dakota*	Williams Arena • Minneapolis, Minnesota (National championship)	W 6–2	24–10–2 (12–10–0)
*Non-conference game. Source:

== Roster and scoring statistics ==
No.	Name	Year	Position	Hometown	S/P/C	Games	Goals	Assists	Points	PIM
1	Rodney Schneck	Junior	G	Wetaskiwin, AB	(Alberta)	37	–	–	–	–
2	Wayne Klinck	Sophomore	D	Regina, SK	(Saskatchewan)	37	–	–	–	66
3	Ed Zemrau	Senior	D	Edmonton, AB	(Alberta)	–	–	–	–	–
4	Barry Sharp	Senior	C	Portage la Prairie, MB	(Manitoba)	37	–	–	43	–
5	Blair Livingstone	Senior	D/F	Toronto, ON	(Ontario)	36	–	–	–	14
7	Walt Dingwall	Junior	LW	Saskatoon, SK	(Saskatchewan)	–	12	–	–	–
8	John Godfrey	Junior	F	Vancouver, BC	(British Columbia)	37	–	–	–	–
9	Alan Cook	Sophomore	G	Brooklyn, NY	(New York (state))	–	–	–	–	–
10	Con Collie	Sophomore	RW	Regina, SK	(Saskatchewan)	–	10	11	21	–
11	Murray Massier	Sophomore	C	Regina, SK	(Saskatchewan)	37	21	30	51	–
13	Dennis Slinn	Sophomore	RW	Regina, SK	(Saskatchewan)	–	–	–	–	–
14	Murray MacDonald	Sophomore	LW	Regina, SK	(Saskatchewan)	–	–	–	–	–
15	Gordon Cresswell	Junior	LW	Toronto, ON	(Ontario)	24	–	–	–	–
16	Bruce Walker	Sophomore	RW	Meadow Lake, SK	(Saskatchewan)	–	18	–	–	–
17	John MacMillan	Sophomore	RW	Lethbridge, AB	(Alberta)	37	19	12	31	50
18	Al Barnhill	Sophomore	D	Wetaskiwin, AB	(Alberta)	–	–	–	–	–
19	Jim Brown	Sophomore	C	Calgary, AB	(Alberta)	35	29	25	54	–
Total										

- Alan Cook was a member of the team but did not play in any game.

== Goaltending Statistics ==
No.	Name	Games	Minutes	Wins	Losses	Ties	Goals against	Saves	Shut outs	SV %	GAA
1	Rodnek Schneck	36	–	24	10	2	–	–	3	.890	3.10
9	Alan Cook	–	–	–	–	–	–	–	–	–	–
Total		36	–	–	–	–	–	–	–	–	–

== 1958 championship game ==
=== W1 North Dakota vs. W2 Denver ===
March 15	North Dakota	2 – 6	Denver	Williams Arena	Recap

Scoring summary
Period	Team	Goal	Assist(s)	Time	Score
1st	UND	Ed Thomlinson	Steenson	7:22	1–0 UND
2nd	DEN	Jim Brown	Sharp	27:18	1–1
2nd	DEN	Bruce Walker	Massier and Dingwall	30:39	2–1 DEN
2nd	DEN	Walt Dingwall – GW	Massier and Zemrau	30:58	3–1 DEN
3rd	UND	Joe Poole	King	45:21	3–2 DEN
3rd	DEN	Murray Massier	Klinck and Walker	47:18	4–2 DEN
3rd	DEN	Barry Sharp	Collie	53:49	5–2 DEN
3rd	DEN	Dennis Slinn	Massier and Godfrey	56:17	6–2 DEN

Shots by period
Team	1	2	3	T
Denver	10	13	5	28
North Dakota	8	10	5	23

Goaltenders
Team	Name	Saves	Goals against	Time on ice
DEN	Rodney Schneck	21	2	
UND	Robert Peabody	22	6	

== See also ==
- 1958 NCAA Division I Men's Ice Hockey Tournament
- List of NCAA Division I Men's Ice Hockey Tournament champions
