= Bob Dupuis (ice hockey, born 1935) =

American ice hockey player (1935–2020)

- Born: October 15, 1935 Lynn, Massachusetts, USA
- Died: June 3, 2020 (aged 84) Woburn, Massachusetts, USA
- Height: 5 ft 8 in (173 cm)
- Weight: 150 lb (68 kg; 10 st 10 lb)
- Position: Defense
- Played for: Boston University
- National team: United States
- Playing career: 1957–1960

Robert Dupuis (October 15, 1935 – June 3, 2020) was an American ice hockey defenseman who was an All-American for Boston University.

== Career ==
After graduating from Lynn Classical Dupuis began attending Boston University in 1954. He joined the varsity squad the following year and helped the team improve to 11–11. As a junior Dupuis led the Terriers in scoring with 6 goals and 25 points while the team posted its first winning season in four years. He was named team co-captain in his senior season and teamed with Don MacLeod on the blueline to form one of the toughest defensive tandems in the nation. Both players were named as AHCA East All-American while helping BU to finish with a 17–5–1 record. Despite the Terriers having the best record amongst eastern independents, the NCAA selection committee offered the 1958 NCAA Tournament bid to Harvard instead.

After graduating, Dupuis joined the US national team and played for the team during the following season. He appeared in one game during the 1959 World Championships while the team finished in 4th place. Some sources credit Dupuis with 2 assists during the 1960 Winter Olympics but no record exists of his being a member of that team.

Dupuis was inducted into the Boston University Athletic Hall of Fame in 1983.

== Statistics ==
=== Regular season and playoffs ===
			Regular season					Playoffs
Season	Team	League	GP	G	A	Pts	PIM	GP	G	A	Pts	PIM
1955–56	Boston University	NCAA	—	1	7	8	—	—	—	—	—	—
1956–57	Boston University	NCAA	—	6	19	25	—	—	—	—	—	—
1957–58	Boston University	NCAA	23	12	22	34	—	—	—	—	—	—
NCAA totals			—	19	48	67	53	—	—	—	—	—

== Awards and honors ==
Award	Year
AHCA East All-American	1957–58
