= 1957–58 NCAA men's ice hockey season =

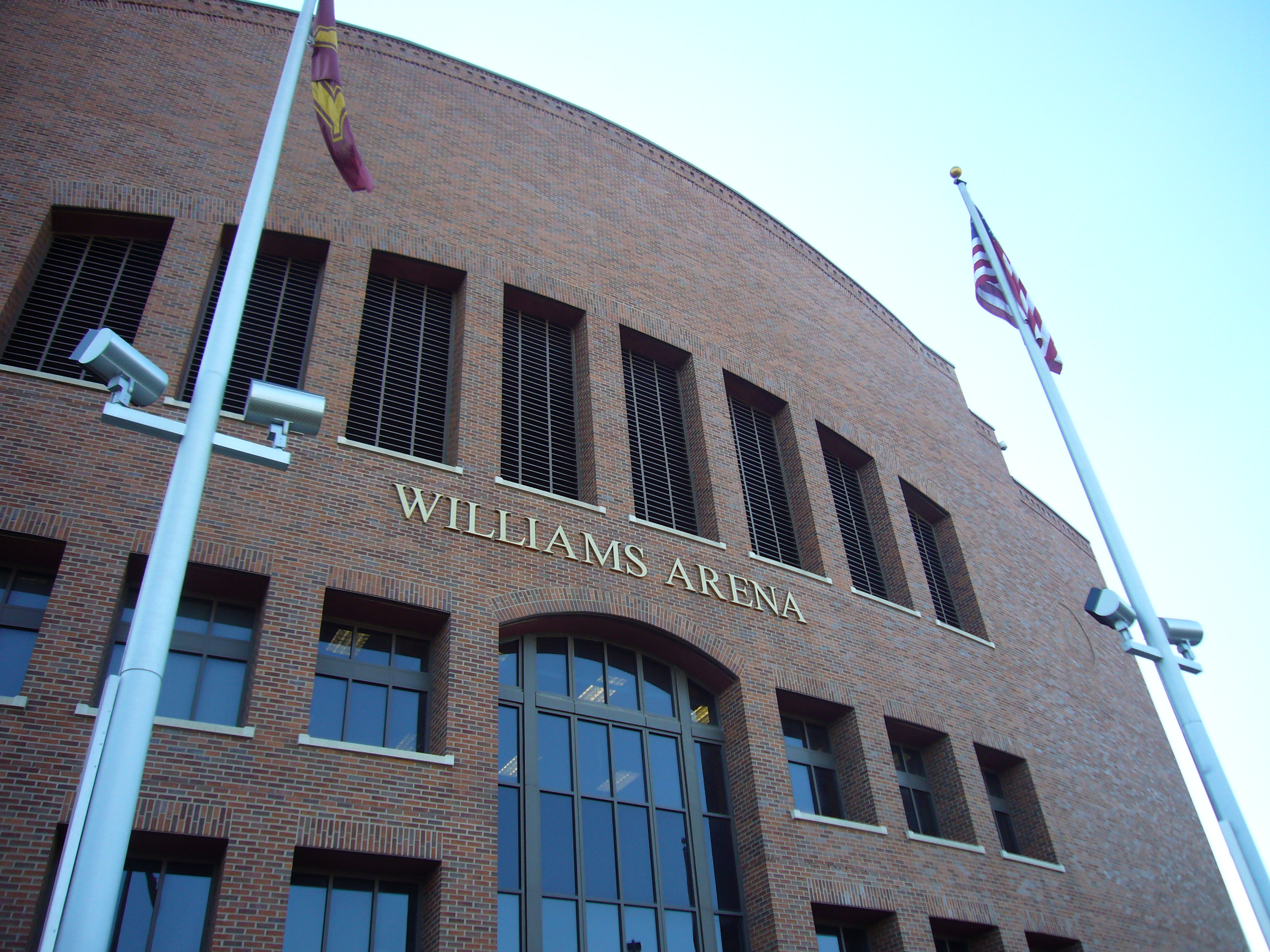
- The Williams Arena served as the host for the 1958 Tournament
- Duration: November 1957– March 15, 1958
- NCAA tournament: 1958
- National championship: Williams Arena; Minneapolis, Minnesota
- NCAA champion: Denver

The 1957–58 NCAA men's ice hockey season began in November 1957 and concluded with the 1958 NCAA Men's Ice Hockey Tournament's championship game on March 15, 1958 at the Williams Arena in Minneapolis, Minnesota. This was the 11th season in which an NCAA ice hockey championship was held and is the 64th year overall where an NCAA school fielded a team.

This was the final season of play for the WIHL. The conference would return two years later as the WCHA.

== Regular season ==
=== Season tournaments ===
Tournament	Dates	Teams	Champion
Boston Arena Christmas Tournament	December 26–28	6	Boston College, Boston University
Rensselaer Holiday Tournament	January 2–4	4	Rensselaer
Beanpot	February 3, 10	4	Boston University

=== Standings ===
1957–58 NCAA Independent ice hockey standings
	Intercollegiate							Overall					
	GP	W	L	T	Pct.	GF	GA	GP	W	L	T	GF	GA
Amherst	–	–	–	–	–	–	–	14	10	4	0	–	–
American International	–	–	–	–	–	–	–	18	4	14	0	–	–
Army	19	14	4	1	.763	102	60	20	15	4	1	107	61
Boston College	–	–	–	–	–	–	–	23	9	12	2	76	101
Boston University	23	17	5	1	.761	157	70	23	17	5	1	157	70
Bowdoin	–	–	–	–	–	–	–	21	5	15	1	–	–
Brown	–	–	–	–	–	–	–	23	11	10	2	87	78
Colby	–	–	–	–	–	–	–	20	9	10	1	–	–
Colgate	–	–	–	–	–	–	–	4	2	2	0	14	26
Cornell	–	–	–	–	–	–	–	11	3	7	1	47	71
Dartmouth	–	–	–	–	–	–	–	24	13	10	1	87	81
Hamilton	–	–	–	–	–	–	–	18	6	10	2	–	–
Harvard	–	–	–	–	–	–	–	29	18	10	1	150	84
Massachusetts	–	–	–	–	–	–	–	14	6	8	0	45	51
Merrimack	–	–	–	–	–	–	–	11	6	3	2	62	52
MIT	–	–	–	–	–	–	–	14	0	14	0	–	–
New Hampshire	–	–	–	–	–	–	–	16	13	3	0	89	42
Northeastern	–	–	–	–	–	–	–	24	7	18	1	87	146
Norwich	–	–	–	–	–	–	–	18	8	10	0	–	–
Princeton	–	–	–	–	–	–	–	18	7	11	0	63	75
Providence	–	–	–	–	–	–	–	22	11	11	0	89	101
St. Olaf	–	–	–	–	–	–	–	13	9	4	0	–	–
Tufts	–	–	–	–	–	–	–	15	5	10	0	–	–
Williams	–	–	–	–	–	–	–	19	8	10	1	–	–
Yale	–	–	–	–	–	–	–	22	8	12	2	83	99

1957–58 Minnesota Intercollegiate Athletic Conference ice hockey standings
	Conference							Overall					
	GP	W	L	T	PTS	GF	GA	GP	W	L	T	GF	GA
Minnesota–Duluth †	10	10	0	0	1.000	–	–	20	13	6	1	–	–
Augsburg	–	–	–	–	–	–	–	–	–	–	–	–	–
Concordia	–	–	–	–	–	–	–	–	–	–	–	–	–
Gustavus Adolphus	–	–	–	–	–	–	–	–	–	–	–	–	–
Hamline	–	–	–	–	–	–	–	–	–	–	–	–	–
Macalester	–	–	–	–	–	–	–	–	–	–	–	–	–
Saint John's	–	–	–	–	–	–	–	13	9	4	0	–	–
St. Thomas	–	–	–	–	–	–	–	17	13	4	0	–	–
† indicates conference champion

1957–58 Tri-State League standings
	Conference							Overall					
	GP	W	L	T	PTS	GF	GA	GP	W	L	T	GF	GA
Clarkson†	5	5	0	0	12	20	9	20	17	3	0	88	47
Rensselaer	5	2	3	0	6	21	22	21	14	6	1	140	76
Middlebury	3	1	2	0	4	10	14	20	15	6	0	–	–
St. Lawrence	5	1	4	0	2	17	23	20	10	8	2	98	72
† indicates conference regular season champion

1957–58 Western Intercollegiate Hockey League
	Conference								Overall					
	GP	W	L	T	PCT	PTS	GF	GA	GP	W	L	T	GF	GA
North Dakota†	20	15	5	0	.750	16	87	60	32	24	7	1	159	82
Denver†	22	12	10	0	.545	16	74	80	36	24	10	2	171	115
Colorado College	20	11	9	0	.550	15	97	74	30	17	12	1	170	116
Minnesota	24	13	11	0	.542	13	90	81	27	16	11	0	106	84
Michigan State	20	9	11	0	.450	10	57	68	23	12	11	0	98	73
Michigan	18	7	11	0	.389	9	53	63	21	8	13	0	61	73
Michigan Tech	20	5	15	0	.250	5	50	80	28	11	16	1	85	96
† indicates conference regular season champion Note: All games played between league members counted in the standings. When teams played each other twice, two points were awarded for a win, one for a tie. When teams met each other four times, one point was awarded for a win, one-half for a tie. When teams met eight times (Denver and CC), one-half point was awarded for a win, and one-fourth point for a tie.

== 1958 NCAA Tournament ==
Semifinals; March 13–14
E1	Clarkson	2
W2	Denver	6
W1	North Dakota	9
E2	Harvard	1

National championship March 15
W2	Denver	6
W1	North Dakota	2
Third-place game
E1	Clarkson	5
E2	Harvard	1

Note: * denotes overtime period(s)

== Player stats ==
=== Scoring leaders ===
The following players led the league in points at the conclusion of the season.

GP = Games played; G = Goals; A = Assists; Pts = Points; PIM = Penalty minutes

Player	Class	Team	GP	G	A	Pts	PIM
Bill Hay	Junior	Colorado College	30	32	48	80	23
Bob Cleary	Senior	Harvard	30	33	43	76	-
Paul Midghall	Sophomore	Rensselaer	21	40	34	74	50
Bob McCusker	Junior	Colorado College	-	34	29	63	-
Mike Karin	Junior	Middlebury	-	29	31	60	-
Ike Scott	Junior	Colorado College	-	32	25	57	-
Pete Bostwick Jr.	Senior	Middlebury	-	26	30	56	-
Garry Kearns	Senior	Rensselaer	21	20	36	56	33
Jim Brown	Sophomore	Denver	35	29	25	54	-
Phil Latreille	Freshman	Middlebury	21	36	16	52	20
Murray Massier	Sophomore	Denver	-	21	30	51	-
Bob Marquis	Sophomore	Boston University	-	24	22	46	-
Jim Ridley	Senior	North Dakota	31	21	25	46	25

=== Leading goaltenders ===
The following goaltenders led the league in goals against average at the end of the regular season while playing at least 33% of their team's total minutes.

GP = Games played; Min = Minutes played; W = Wins; L = Losses; OT = Overtime/shootout losses; GA = Goals against; SO = Shutouts; SV% = Save percentage; GAA = Goals against average

Player	Class	Team	GP	Min	W	L	OT	GA	SO	SV%	GAA
Bob Peters	Sophomore	North Dakota	11	660	9	1	1	14	2	.927	1.27
Larry Palmer	Junior	Army	20	1208	15	4	1	61	2	.899	3.03
Bob Peabody	Junior	North Dakota	21	-	-	-	-	-	1	.870	3.05
Rodney Schneck	Junior	Denver	36	-	24	10	2	-	3	.890	3.10
Jack McCartan	Senior	Minnesota	27	1620	16	11	0	84	1	-	3.11
George Cuculick	Sophomore	Michigan Tech	26	-	-	-	-	-	-	.889	3.20
Joseph Selinger	Junior	Michigan State	23	-	-	-	-	-	-	-	3.27
Neil Coir	Junior	St. Lawrence	16	971	-	-	-	57	0	.880	3.52
Bob Ottone	Junior	Rensselaer	21	1200	14	6	1	75	0	.849	3.75
Jim Toomey	Junior	Providence	13	-	-	-	-	-	-	.869	4.20

== Awards ==
=== NCAA ===
Award		Recipient
Spencer Penrose Award		Harry Cleverly, Boston University
Most Outstanding Player in NCAA Tournament		Murray Massier, Denver
AHCA All-American Teams
East Team	Position	West Team
Eddie MacDonald, Clarkson	G	Jack McCartan, Minnesota
Bob Dupuis, Boston University	D	Bill Steenson, North Dakota
Don MacLeod, Boston University	D	Ed Zemrau, Denver
Bob Cleary, Harvard	F	Bill Hay, Colorado College
Bob Marquis, Boston University	F	Dick Burg, Minnesota
Paul Midghall, Rensselaer	F	Bob McCusker, Colorado College
	F	Bob White, Michigan

=== WIHL ===
No Awards

All-WIHL Teams
First Team	Position	Second Team
Jack McCartan, Minnesota	G	Joe Selinger, Michigan State
Bill Steenson, North Dakota	D	Bob Watt, Michigan
Ed Zemrau, Denver	D	Mike Pearson, Minnesota
Bill Hay, Colorado College	F	Dick Burg, Minnesota
Ike Scott, Colorado College	F	Jim Ridley, North Dakota
Bob McCusker, Colorado College	F	Murray Massier, Denver
