= Daryn McBride =

Canadian ice hockey player

- Born: March 29, 1968 (age 58) Fort Saskatchewan, Alberta, Canada
- Height: 5 ft 10 in (178 cm)
- Weight: 185 lb (84 kg; 13 st 3 lb)
- Position: Right Wing
- Shot: Right
- Played for: Denver; New Haven Nighthawks; Phoenix Roadrunners; Utica Devils; Cincinnati Cyclones; HC Gherdëina; Neusser EC
- National team: United States
- NHL draft: 194th, 1987; Pittsburgh Penguins
- Playing career: 1986–1995

Daryn McBride is a Canadian retired ice hockey right wing who was an All-American for Denver.

== Career ==
McBride began playing for Denver a year after the team made a surprise run to the Frozen Four. The Pioneers sank back to the middle of the pack afterwards and McBride could only help the team finish a game above .500. After his freshman season the Pittsburgh Penguins took a flyer on McBride, using a 10th-round selection on him in NHL Draft. He rewarded the selection with a 30-goal season the year after and he led the Pioneers in scoring. Denver wasn't much better than they were in his first season and remained a mediocre team through the end of his junior season. Despite the lack of team success, McBride was named an All-American in 1989 and led Denver to the WCHA Championship.

McBride left school after his third season and joined the Canadian national team, remaining with the program for over a year before joining the professional ranks in 1990. He spent parts of two seasons bouncing between minor professional leagues in the US before heading over to Europe in 1992. McBride played two years for HC Gherdëina before ending his career with Neusser EC in the German second league.

After retiring, McBride became a financial advisor for professional athletes and has been working in the field since 1996.

== Statistics ==
=== Regular season and playoffs ===
			Regular Season					Playoffs
Season	Team	League	GP	G	A	Pts	PIM	GP	G	A	Pts	PIM
1985–86	Sherwood Park Crusaders	AJHL	47	16	23	39	150	—	—	—	—	—
1986–87	Denver	WCHA	39	19	13	32	54	—	—	—	—	—
1987–88	Denver	WCHA	39	30	28	58	122	—	—	—	—	—
1988–89	Denver	WCHA	42	19	32	51	74	—	—	—	—	—
1988–89	Team Canada	International	15	3	7	10	6	—	—	—	—	—
1989–90	Team Canada	International	51	15	32	47	39	—	—	—	—	—
1990–91	New Haven Nighthawks	AHL	6	0	1	1	17	—	—	—	—	—
1990–91	Phoenix Roadrunners	IHL	61	9	32	41	26	—	—	—	—	—
1991–92	Utica Devils	AHL	51	10	19	29	47	—	—	—	—	—
1991–92	Cincinnati Cyclones	ECHL	19	7	15	22	62	—	—	—	—	—
1992–93	HC Gherdëina	Alpenliga	29	23	—	—	—	—	—	—	—	—
1992–93	HC Gherdëina	Serie A	8	6	13	19	37	3	2	0	2	4
1993–94	HC Gherdëina	Alpenliga	19	13	18	31	14	—	—	—	—	—
1994–95	Neusser EC	1st Liga	36	43	38	81	96	—	—	—	—	—
NCAA totals			120	68	73	141	250	—	—	—	—	—
AHL totals			57	10	20	30	64	—	—	—	—	—

== Awards and honors ==
Award	Year
All-WCHA Second Team	1987–88
All-WCHA First Team	1988–89
AHCA West Second-Team All-American	1988–89
