= Eddie Miller (ice hockey) =

Canadian ice hockey player

- Born: 1930 Leetonia, Minnesota, USA
- Died: December 27, 2014 (aged 83–84)
- Position: Forward/Defenceman
- Played for: Denver
- National team: United States
- Playing career: 1950–1953
- Military career
- Allegiance: United States
- Branch: United States Navy
- Service years: 1945-1947

Edward "Eddie" Miller (died December 27,2014) was an American ice hockey Forward and Defenceman who was a member of the inaugural recruiting class at Denver.

== Career ==
The son of Croatian immigrants, Miller was born in raised in Leetonia, Minnesota, now a part of Hibbing. After graduating from Hibbing High School he joined the navy and served for two years. After returning home he worked as a miner for two years before getting his chance at college hockey. Denver University began its ice hockey program in 1949 and Miller was in the first class of players to be invited to join the team. He didn't play on the varsity squad during his freshman season as the NCAA had rules stipulating that students were only permitted to play three year on any varsity team, but by the start of his sophomore year, Miller was with the big squad. Miller was one of the reasons why Denver nearly tripled its win total in the second season and then finished with an 18–6–1 mark in his junior season. Denver narrowly missed out on making its first NCAA tournament appearance in 1952 but Miller did receive recognition as one of the top defensemen that season with his selection as an AHCA First Team All-American, the first in the history of the program.

After leaving Denver in 1953, Miller returned to Minnesota and worked as a teacher and ice hockey coach in Baudette and Wayzata for over 30 years. Miller continued to play throughout the 1950s, winning the national senior amateur championship with the Minneapolis Bungalow team in 1957. A year later Miller played for the US national team at the 1958 Ice Hockey World Championships but finished disappointed in 5th-place.

Late in life, Miller was inducted into both the Hibbing Hall of Fame (1996) and the Denver Athletic Hall of Fame (2000).

== Statistics ==
=== Regular season and playoffs ===
			Regular season					Playoffs
Season	Team	League	GP	G	A	Pts	PIM	GP	G	A	Pts	PIM
1950–51	Denver	NCAA	—	26	18	44	—	—	—	—	—	—
1951–52	Denver	NCAA	—	8	14	22	38	—	—	—	—	—
1952–53	Denver	MCHL	—	10	5	15	—	—	—	—	—	—
NCAA totals			—	44	37	81	—	—	—	—	—	—

=== International ===
Year	Team	GP	G	A	Pts	PIM
1958	United States	6	0	1	1	4

== Awards and honors ==
Award	Year
All-MCHL First Team	1951–52; 1952–53
AHCA First Team All-American	1951–52
