= Trevor Moore (ice hockey) =

American ice hockey player (born 1995)

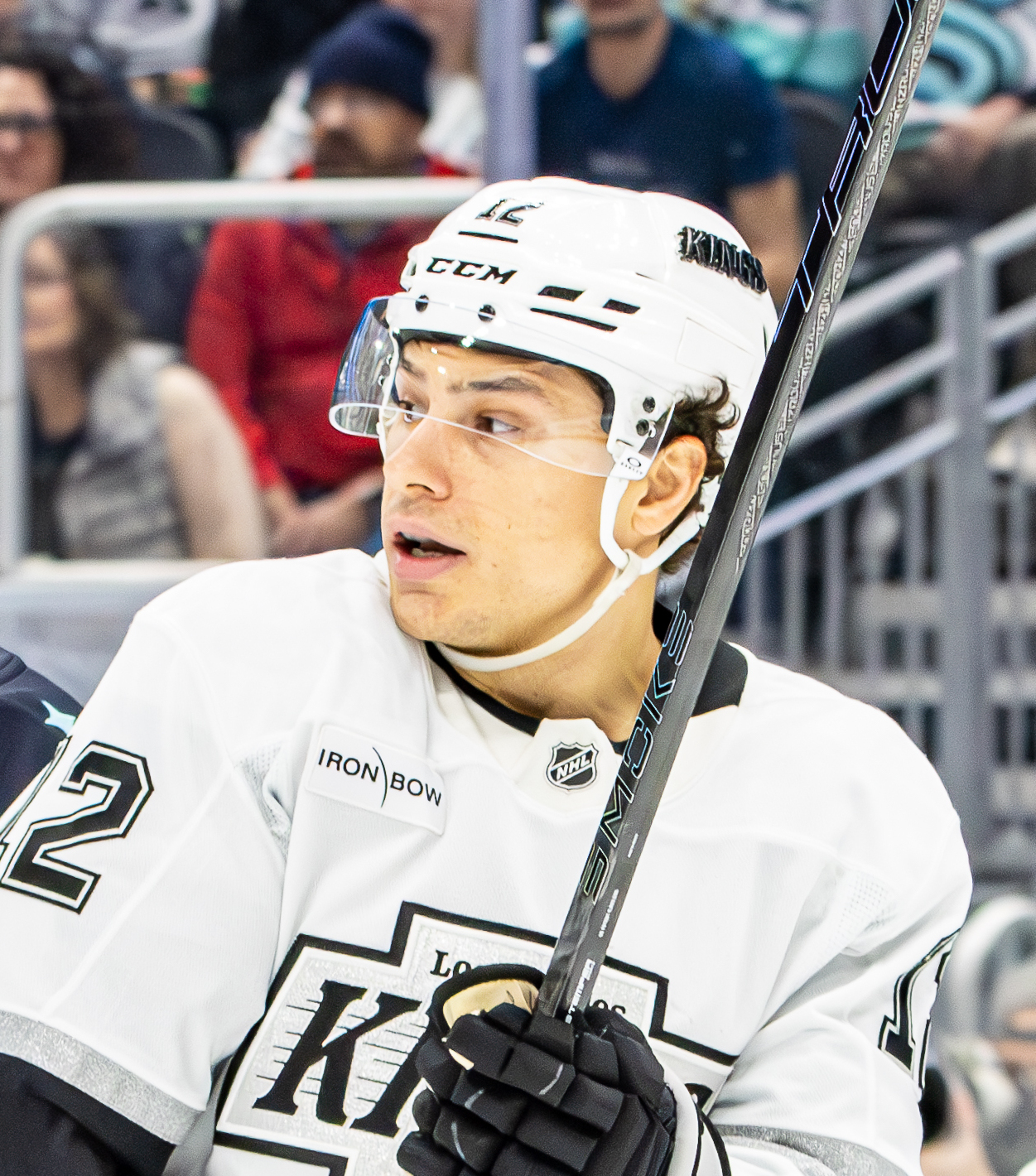
- Moore with the Los Angeles Kings in 2025
- Born: March 31, 1995 (age 31) Thousand Oaks, California, U.S.
- Height: 5 ft 10 in (178 cm)
- Weight: 185 lb (84 kg; 13 st 3 lb)
- Position: Left wing
- Shoots: Left
- NHL team Former teams: Los Angeles Kings; Toronto Maple Leafs
- National team: United States
- NHL draft: Undrafted
- Playing career: 2016–present

Trevor Moore (born March 31, 1995) is an American professional ice hockey player who is a left winger for the Los Angeles Kings of the National Hockey League (NHL). While playing college ice hockey with the University of Denver, Moore was named to the NCAA Second All-American Team and NCHC Forward of the Year. Moore helped lead the American Hockey League (AHL)'s Toronto Marlies to their first Calder Cup in 2018.

== Playing career ==
Moore grew up in Ventura County, California, where he played youth ice hockey for the Los Angeles Hockey Club. In high school he played with the Tri-City Storm, of the United States Hockey League, in Kearney, Nebraska. He then played three seasons with the University of Denver. In his freshman year, Moore was named to the NCHC All-Rookie Team. In his sophomore year, he was named to the NCAA Second All-American Team and NCHC Forward of the Year.

After his junior season, Moore signed with the Toronto Maple Leafs as an undrafted free agent on July 26, 2016. He subsequently joined the Maple Leafs' American Hockey League (AHL) affiliate, the Toronto Marlies, for the 2016–17 season after attending the Leafs training camp. In Moore's second season with the Marlies, 2017–18, he helped them earn their first Calder Cup.

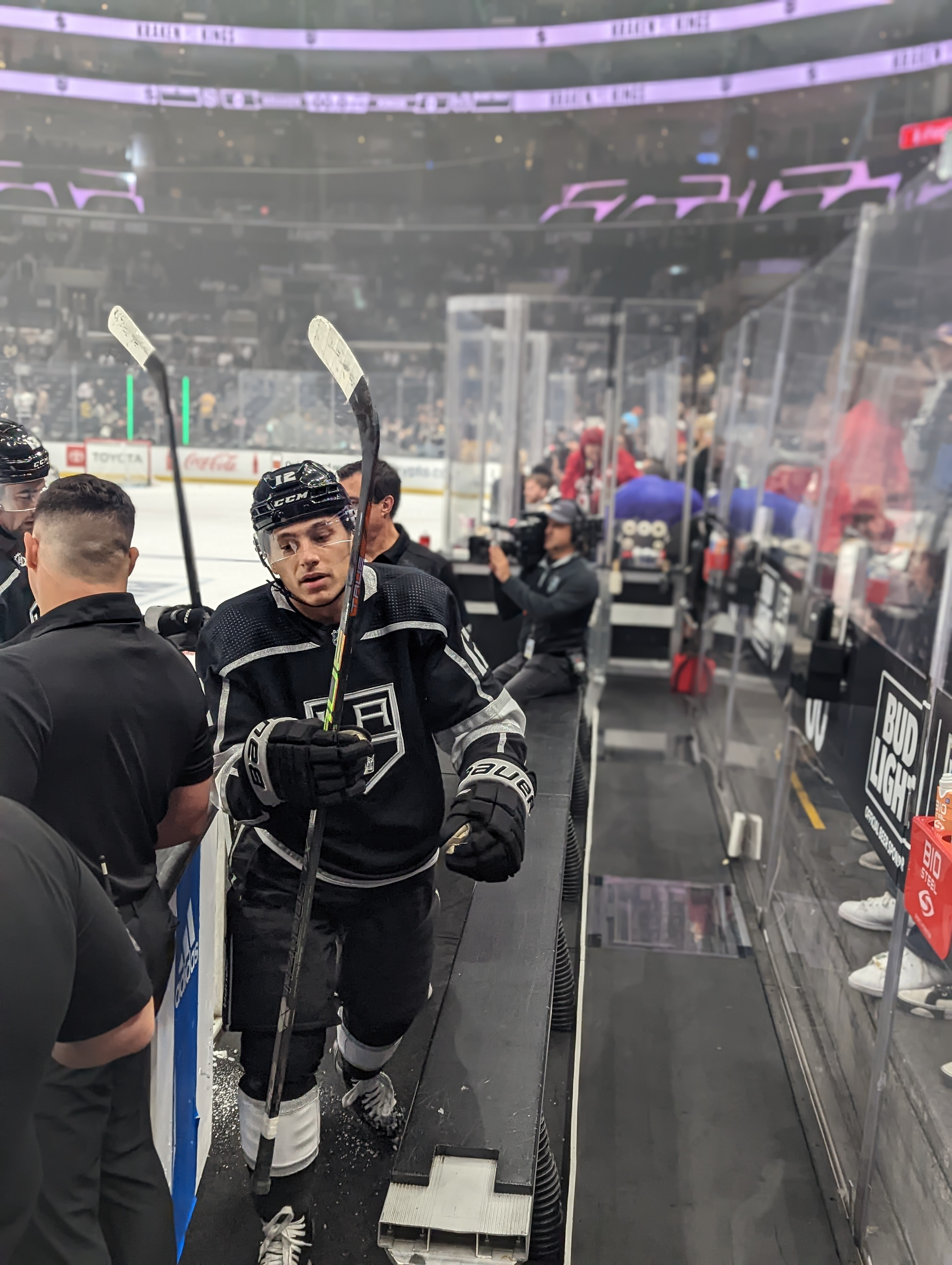
Moore with the Kings in 2022

On November 13, 2018, Moore was recalled to the Maple Leafs ahead of their West Coast road trip. He was sent back to the Marlies shortly after, but following an injury to Tyler Ennis, he was recalled again on December 23. Moore made his NHL debut that night in a 5–4 overtime win against the Detroit Red Wings, recording up his first career NHL point, an assist on a goal by Frédérik Gauthier. His first goal was scored four games later, on January 5, 2019, in a 5–0 win over the Vancouver Canucks. On January 13, Moore signed a two-year contract extension with the Maple Leafs.

During the 2019–20 season, on February 5, 2020, Moore (alongside third-round picks in 2020 and 2021) was traded to the Los Angeles Kings for Kyle Clifford and Jack Campbell.

On July 24, 2021, Moore signed a two-year, $3.75 million contract extension with the Kings.

During the 2021–22 season, Moore achieved career bests in goals, points, and assists. He scored 5 short-handed goals, tying Alex Formenton for the NHL lead in short-handed goals that year. On March 26, 2022, a petition was launched to rename the roller rink at the Arroyo Vista Community Park in Moorpark, California to "Trevor Moore's Moorpark Center for More Hockey".

On December 15, 2022, the Kings signed Moore to a five-year contract extension with an average annual value of $4.2 million.

== Career statistics ==
=== Regular season and playoffs ===
			Regular season					Playoffs
Season	Team	League	GP	G	A	Pts	PIM	GP	G	A	Pts	PIM
2011–12	Tri–City Storm	USHL	49	12	20	32	6	2	0	2	2	0
2012–13	Tri–City Storm	USHL	62	20	43	63	26	—	—	—	—	—
2013–14	University of Denver	NCHC	42	14	18	32	14	—	—	—	—	—
2014–15	University of Denver	NCHC	39	22	22	44	7	—	—	—	—	—
2015–16	University of Denver	NCHC	40	11	33	44	8	—	—	—	—	—
2016–17	Toronto Marlies	AHL	57	13	20	33	18	11	2	2	4	4
2017–18	Toronto Marlies	AHL	68	12	21	33	22	20	6	11	17	4
2018–19	Toronto Marlies	AHL	46	23	16	39	22	10	5	3	8	2
2018–19	Toronto Maple Leafs	NHL	25	2	6	8	2	7	1	0	1	0
2019–20	Toronto Maple Leafs	NHL	27	3	2	5	4	—	—	—	—	—
2019–20	Toronto Marlies	AHL	2	1	1	2	2	—	—	—	—	—
2019–20	Los Angeles Kings	NHL	15	3	2	5	2	—	—	—	—	—
2020–21	Los Angeles Kings	NHL	56	10	13	23	18	—	—	—	—	—
2021–22	Los Angeles Kings	NHL	81	17	31	48	20	7	2	3	5	16
2022–23	Los Angeles Kings	NHL	59	10	19	29	14	6	1	2	3	0
2023–24	Los Angeles Kings	NHL	82	31	26	57	28	5	1	0	1	4
2024–25	Los Angeles Kings	NHL	71	18	22	40	14	6	2	2	4	0
2025–26	Los Angeles Kings	NHL	69	13	19	32	8	4	1	1	2	0
NHL totals			485	107	140	247	110	35	8	8	16	20

Medal record

Representing United States

Ice hockey

World Championships
Bronze medal – third place	2021 Latvia	

=== International ===
Year	Team	Event	Result	GP	G	A	Pts	PIM
2021	United States	WC	3rd place, bronze medalist(s)	10	5	4	9	4
Senior totals				10	5	4	9	4

== Awards and honors ==
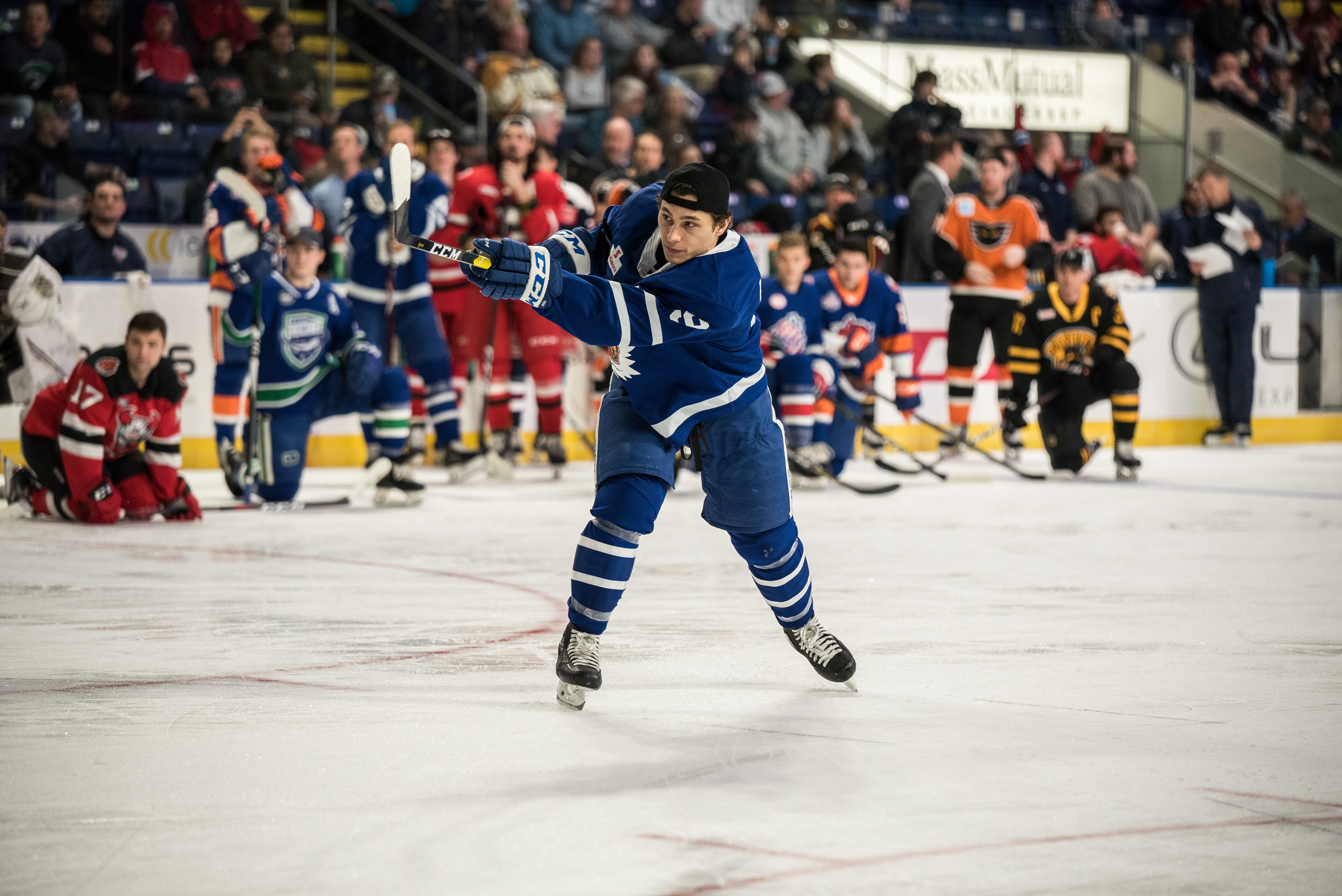
Trevor Moore with the Toronto Marlies during the 2019 AHL All-Star Skills Competition

Award	Year	Ref
College
NCHC All-Rookie Team	2014	
NCAA Second All-American Team	2015	
NCHC Forward of the Year	2015	
AHL
Calder Cup champion	2018	

Awards and achievements
Preceded by Josh Archibald	NCHC Forward of the Year; 2014–15	Succeeded by Danton Heinen
