= Dick Burg =

American ice hockey player (born 1936)

- Born: March 24, 1936 (age 90) Edina, Minnesota, U.S.
- Height: 5 ft 10 in (178 cm)
- Weight: 181 lb (82 kg; 12 st 13 lb)
- Position: Wing
- Played for: Minnesota
- National team: United States
- Playing career: 1955–1963

Richard Burg (born March 24, 1936) is an American retired ice hockey winger who was an All-American for Minnesota.

== Career ==
After a stellar junior career where he was an "All-City" in baseball, football and hockey, Burg began attending the University of Minnesota in 1954. While he initially planned to play all three sports in college, Burg suffered a shoulder injury while playing freshman football that forced him to stop playing both football and baseball. He focused solely on hockey and, when he made the varsity team as a sophomore, he played well. He finished 4th in team scoring in 1956 but both Burg and the team flagged the following year.

As a senior Burg had a resurgence, leading the Gophers with 19 goals and 35 points and was named an All-American. After graduating Burg joined the US National Team, scoring 20 goals in 50 games during the season. He was also a member of the squad at the 1959 World Championships, but has the unfortunate distinction of being the only forward on the team to not score a goal during the tournament. The team could have used a goal from Burg since they finished in a tie with Czechoslovakia for third place and were beaten on the third tie-breaker for the bronze medal (the second tie-breaker was goal-differential).

Burg was not selected for the national team the following year, spending the season with the Minneapolis Millers of the USCHL. After Team USA won goal at the 1960 Winter Olympics, Burg was offered a second stint with the team at the 1961 World Championships. Both Burg and the team performed worse than the last time with the team managing to win just a single game while Burg was limited to one assist in seven games. After that debacle Burg returned to semi-pro hockey in Minnesota, playing two seasons in the USHL before retiring.

Burg was later inducted into the Minneapolis Hockey Hall of Fame.

== Statistics ==
=== Regular season and playoffs ===
			Regular season					Playoffs
Season	Team	League	GP	G	A	Pts	PIM	GP	G	A	Pts	PIM
1955–56	Minnesota	WIHL	29	10	10	20	17	—	—	—	—	—
1956–57	Minnesota	WIHL	20	8	4	12	16	—	—	—	—	—
1957–58	Minnesota	WIHL	28	19	16	35	30	—	—	—	—	—
1958–59	US National Team	International	50	20	12	32	20	—	—	—	—	—
1959–60	Minneapolis Millers	USCHL	—	—	—	—	—	—	—	—	—	—
1961–62	Minneapolis Rebels	USHL	—	—	—	—	—	—	—	—	—	—
1962–63	St. Paul Steers	USHL	—	—	—	—	—	—	—	—	—	—
NCAA totals			77	37	30	67	63	—	—	—	—	—

=== International ===
Year	Team	GP	G	A	Pts	PIM
1959	United States	8	0	4	4	4
1961	United States	7	0	1	1	6
Totals		15	0	5	5	10

== Awards and honors ==
Award	Year
All-WIHL Second Team	1957–58
AHCA West All-American	1957–58
