= Denver Pioneers men's ice hockey =

- Current season
- University: University of Denver
- Conference: NCHC
- First season: 1949–50
- Head coach: David Carle; 8th season, 179–74–17 (.694)
- Assistant coaches: Tavis MacMillan; Dallas Ferguson; Ryan Massa
- Arena: Magness Arena; Denver, Colorado
- Colors: Crimson and gold

NCAA tournament champions
- 1958, 1960, 1961, 1968, 1969, 2004, 2005, 2017, 2022, 2024, 2026

NCAA tournament runner-up
- 1963, 1964, 1973 (Note: Vacated by NCAA.)

NCAA tournament Frozen Four
- 1958, 1960, 1961, 1963, 1964, 1966, 1968, 1969, 1971, 1972, 1973, 1986, 2004, 2005, 2016, 2017, 2019, 2022, 2024, 2025, 2026

NCAA tournament appearances
- 1958, 1960, 1961, 1963, 1964, 1966, 1968, 1969, 1971, 1972, 1973, 1986, 1995, 1997, 1999, 2002, 2004, 2005, 2008, 2009, 2010, 2011, 2012, 2013, 2014, 2015, 2016, 2017, 2018, 2019, 2022, 2023, 2024, 2025, 2026

Conference tournament champions
- WCHA: 1960, 1961, 1963, 1964, 1966, 1968, 1969, 1971, 1972, 1973, 1986, 1999, 2002, 2005, 2008; NCHC: 2014, 2018, 2024, 2026

Conference regular season champions
- WCHA: 1958, 1960, 1961, 1963, 1964, 1968, 1972, 1973, 1978, 1986, 2002, 2005, 2010; NCHC: 2017, 2022, 2023

Current uniform
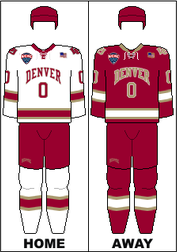

The Denver Pioneers men's ice hockey team is a National Collegiate Athletic Association (NCAA) Division I college ice hockey program that represents the University of Denver. They play at Magness Arena in Denver, Colorado. The Pioneers are a member of the National Collegiate Hockey Conference (NCHC). Previously, they were members of the Western Collegiate Hockey Association (WCHA), from its creation in 1959 until 2013.

The Pioneers have won the most all-time NCAA National Hockey Championships with 11 (1958, 1960, 1961, 1968, 1969, 2004, 2005, 2017, 2022, 2024, 2026). The Pioneers have won 15 regular-season conference championships (13 WCHA, 2 NCHC) and 14 conference playoff championships (15 WCHA, 2 NCHC).

Over 80 Pioneers have gone on to play in the National Hockey League, including Keith Magnuson, Kevin Dineen, Matt Carle (2006 Hobey Baker Award winner), Paul Stastny, and Troy Terry.

== History ==
=== Early years ===
In 1949, the DU Arena, a former WWII surplus drill hall from Idaho, was reassembled in Denver with an ice plant, giving the university the ability to properly field an ice hockey team for the first time. Vern Turner, the rink manager for the Broadmoor Ice Palace and a former semi-professional goaltender, was hired as the team's first coach, and the Pioneers hit the ice for their first game in December, losing to the University of Saskatchewan, 17–0. Denver would, unsurprisingly, lose its first 9 games before recording the first victory against Wyoming on January 27. The team improved the following season, finishing with an 11–11–1 record. Turner stepped down after the season, giving Neil Celley the opportunity to build the program. When Celley assumed the reins, he was the youngest head coach in the history of college ice hockey, at 24, and had won a national title with Michigan the year before, as a player. The team responded to the coaching change, improving their record to 18–6–1 and finished tied for second in the inaugural MCHL standings. Unfortunately, Michigan was selected ahead of Denver for the NCAA tournament due to a better overall record. The Pioneers would continue to play well, but their winning percentage dropped every year until 1956, when they finished just a hair above .500. Celley resigned at season's end and turned the team over to ex-NHLer Murray Armstrong.

=== Armstrong era ===
Armstrong came to DU and guaranteed an NCAA title within three years, and did it in his second year. Using Armstrong's coaching pipeline to ex-junior players in Canada, it took a year to get going, but by 1958, the Pioneers were firing on all cylinders. Denver won its first conference title (tying with North Dakota) and received the second western seed for its first NCAA tournament bid. Denver did not let the bright lights stun them as they rolled through the competition, winning both games 6–2 to gain their first NCAA national title in Minneapolis. The next season, an argument between conference members over the recruitment of Canadian players who had played junior hockey, caused the WIHL to collapse and left Denver without a conference. Denver struggled to fill out its schedule and though DU finished with the best record of any western team (22–5–1) their competition was so paltry that the Pioneers were passed over in favor of North Dakota (who had taken three of four matches between them) for the NCAA tournament with Big Ten champion Michigan State receiving the other bid. After that disaster, all teams that had been in the WIHL restarted the conference under a new name (WCHA) and instituted a playoff among other reforms. Because the matter of recruitment was left unchanged, Denver was able to take full advantage and build their program into the dominant power for the duration of the decade.

==== Early 60s ====
Denver kicked off its first season in the WCHA by winning the regular season title and being WCHA tournament co-champions along with Michigan Tech. The WCHA had arranged its tournament to take advantage of the NCAA bid policy that would give automatic bids to tournament champions and because there was no rival western conference the WCHA could guarantee that both of its co-champions would make the frozen four. Denver won both of its NCAA games and captured the 1960 National Title. The Tournament MOP was split for the first time that year and while it was given to three separate players, none of them wore Denver sweaters. The Pioneers followed up their second championship by thoroughly dominating the competition in 1961. In what is typically ranked among the best seasons ever, the squad began with five victories before dropping a match to Michigan Tech on the road and then never lost another game. The '61 Pioneers scored 242 times in only 32 contests for a rate of just over 7.5 goals per game. Additionally, they allowed just 59 goals against in that time (1.84). While neither marks were records, the average scoring differential of +5.72 is still an NCAA record. Denver had the second-and third-leading scoring in the nation who were only topped by Phil Latreille scoring an all-time NCAA record of 80 goals in 21 games. Not only did the Pioneers post the first 30-win season in NCAA history but, by playing in every game, George Kirkwood set an NCAA record for wins in a season (30). Denver made sure they also did their damage when it counted the most; in the four playoff games they played (2 conference, 2 NCAA) the Pioneers won each by at least 5 goals and won all four matches by a total of 35–6. In the NCAA championship game against St. Lawrence, Denver surrendered the first goal but ended the night by scoring the final nine (an NCAA record) and won the game by 10 goals, 12-2 (also an NCAA record) and were one short of tying the NCAA record of 13 in the championship game. Denver tied the record by placing 5 players on the All-Tournament Team and set the record with 5 players on the All-WCHA First Team as well as the AHCA All-American Team and swept all 5 individual awards offered that year. Three of the players from that team eventually played in the NHL, a rare occurrence for NCAA teams at the time.

After such unparalleled dominance, it was expected that Denver would decline the following year, especially with so many of the players graduating, but the team still finished 3rd in the WCHA. One year later they won both WCHA conference titles and again made the NCAA tournament. After dropping Clarkson in a relatively easy 6–2 semifinal match Denver faced off against North Dakota for a rematch of it first title in 1958. The Fighting Sioux scored three times before 8 minutes had elapsed and, while Denver responded with two quick goals, North Dakota tacked on two more in the first to finish with a 5–2 lead. When they added another 5 minutes into the second it looked as if they were going to walk to a national title but the Pioneers did not quit and scored twice to cut the lead in half entering the third. North Dakota closed ranks and set up a wall in front of Rudy Unis in the final frame but still could not stop Denver from scoring, however, the Pioneers could only notch one goal and lost their first NCAA tournament game, 5–6. The team's streak of seven consecutive tournament wins from the start is still an NCAA record.

Denver followed up that disappointment with a second-place finish despite playing only 10 games and a WCHA tournament championship over Michigan. In the NCAA tournament DU produced a very similar result to the year before by dropping their semifinal opponent easily, then allowing the team they defeated in the WCHA championship to score the first three goals. This time it was the Wolverines who would take the title and send the Pioneers home disappointed. The next season Denver finished with a record of 18–8–2, one of the best in the nation, but because they only played 12 conference games and won only 4 matches they finished 6th in the WCHA and were left out of the conference playoffs. The following season Denver increased their conference schedule to 20 games but because the WCHA added Minnesota–Duluth as a member, the conference tournament now included all 8 teams. Denver was given a regional matchup against the dismal Colorado College Tigers and took the game easily to give them a shot against arch-nemesis North Dakota for an entry to the NCAA tournament. Despite being the lower seed the game was played in Denver's home stadium due in part to a terrible blizzard that dropped more than two feet around Grand Forks. The home game may have given Denver just enough of an advantage and the Pioneers edged UND, 5–4 in overtime to return to the NCAA tournament. Once there Denver faced Clarkson for the third time in the semifinal but the Golden Knights were able to avenge their earlier losses and send DU to its first consolation game. Though they won the match the Pioneers and their fans were far from satisfied with the result. The following season Denver rose to 2nd in the conference but because the WCHA tournament was still arranged for regional matchups the Pioneers had to play top seed North Dakota in the second round and the Fighting Sioux were able to redeem themselves with a win.

==== Late 60s ====
While many programs may have been happy with the results Denver achieved in '66 and '67 the Pioneers were decidedly nonplussed. When the team began 1968 season slowly, losing three out of their first five games, they were taken to task and responded by winning every remaining game except for a stretch in late December when they played four Olympic squads. Denver finished the season atop the WCHA and with the regional restrictions abolished they were able to take full advantage of their top seed and demolish their competition 27–7 in the three games. In the NCAA tournament Denver faced Boston College for the first time and swatted the Eagles away with a 4–1 victory despite sloppy play. The final brought North Dakota and DU together for a rubber match and the two teams fought a tough defensive battle through two periods before the floodgates opened and Denver scored four times in the final frame while Gerry Powers earned the first shutout in a championship game. The next season was much the same; after a slow start the Pioneers ran through most of their competition, finishing second in the WCHA and taking down much weaker opponents in the conference tournament to return to the NCAA playoff. For this 1969 championship they beat Harvard 9–2 in the opening match before facing Ken Dryden-led Cornell. The Pioneers did not have any problems scoring against the seemingly impregnable Big Red defense, building leads three times while the final one stuck and Denver won its fifth NCAA national title, 4–3.

==== Dynasty's end ====
Despite losing many players from the dual national title teams due to graduations Denver did not lose much footing and finished second in the WCHA but lost to new entry Wisconsin in the conference tournament. The next season, Denver finished second for the third straight year and were able to win another league co-championship and receive the top western seed. The Pioneers had to settle for a third place NCAA finish after losing only their second semifinal game in nine opportunities. The next season, Denver won both conference titles for the fifth time in their history but were stunned by a 2–7 loss to Cornell in the semifinal, the team's worst loss to a college team in over six years. As if their recent tournament collapses needed a concrete symbol, the DU Arena roof failed in 1972 and forced the team to play most of their remaining home games at the Denver Coliseum. While the Pioneers were able to overcome that difficulty and win the WCHA yet again and finish as the NCAA runner-up it was a battle off the ice that would eventually cost them dearly.

Throughout the 1960s, the matter of recruiting Canadian major junior players was becoming an issue again, and by the 1970s, Minnesota coach John Mariucci was pushing the NCAA for change. Mariucci did not like his teenage American players, who grew up playing locally in Minnesota, playing against older Canadian players that Denver recruited, due to Denver's lack of local players to recruit. Minnesota even refused to schedule the Pioneers for years in the 1960s, which spurred the NCAA to support Minnesota's position. In 1974, the NCAA asked all schools that rostered major junior Canadian players to declare these students ineligible and in recompense, the current players would have their NCAA eligibility restored as a grandfathering ploy, with all future major junior players remaining ineligible. While most universities acceded to the NCAA demand, Denver did not. The school refused to call its own players 'cheaters', and ended up paying the price. The university had its trip to the 1973 tournament vacated and with its pipeline from Canada cut, the team began to falter in the standings. 1974–75 saw Denver post its first losing season since Armstrong's first year and while the team was slowly recovering, DU would not make another tournament appearance until long after his retirement in 1977.

=== Decline ===
Armstrong's assistant Marshall Johnston took over and the team jumped up in the standings as the nation's top-ranked team, winning the WCHA regular season crown and breaking the school record for wins with 33 (albeit in 40 games) but DU was stopped in the WCHA second round by an upstart Colorado College team, after finding out that Denver's appeal to be eligible for the 1978 NCAA tournament was denied by the NCAA. After declining to 6th place the following season. Denver ended 1979–80 dead last in the WCHA and missed the playoffs entirely. The team rebounded the next season but afterwards, Johnston returned to the NHL and the program was given to a third-straight former pro, Ralph Backstrom. Backstrom's entry coincided with four WCHA members bolting for the CCHA leaving the conference with only 6 schools. The co-championship format was abolished and though Denver provided some glimpse of hope in Backstrom's first season, the team slipped towards the bottom of the division for three seasons. By the end of the 1984–85 season Denver had lost eight consecutive playoff games and was in danger of becoming an afterthought in the WCHA. The 1985–86 team provided a surprising start the following campaign, winning seven of their first eight-game en route to the WCHA regular season and playoff championships over Michigan Tech, Minnesota-Duluth and Minnesota, followed by a home NCAA 7–6 total goal series win over Cornell to make it to the Frozen Four. Denver played a school record 48 games that year, and won 34 contests (also a DU record) despite losing in the NCAA semifinal, 5–2 to Harvard in Providence. The stark turnaround garnered Backstrom the Spencer Penrose Award. The highlights were short-lived, however and over the succeeding four years Denver returned to being a middling team in the WCHA.

Backstrom left in 1990 and was replaced by Frank Serratore. While he would later achieve a great deal of success with Air Force Serratore's time in Denver was the darkest period in the history of the program. In his first season, the Pioneers won only 6 games, losing a school record 30 of 38 matches. The following season brought only marginal improvements but when the team rose above .500 in 1992–93 it looked like Serratore's job may be saved, but after slipping back to 9th in the conference the year after he was out as coach and replaced by Wisconsin alumnus George Gwozdecky.

=== Gwozdecky era ===
When Denver hired Gwozdecky, they hoped they were getting the same coach that had won back-to-back CCHA Coach of the Year awards at Miami (Ohio). In his first season in 1995, he delivered by getting the Pioneers to win 10 more games than they had the year before, and jump from 9th in the conference, to a tie for second place and an NCAA win over New Hampshire. After a disappointing opening round loss in the WCHA playoffs the following year, Denver returned to the NCAA tournament in 1997 and beat a very strong Vermont squad in the first round. In 1999 the Pioneers were able to defeat a dominant North Dakota to take their first conference championship in thirteen years, but lost their first NCAA tournament game to Michigan in the first meeting between the two since the Wolverines left the WCHA. Denver stumbled over the next two years before winning their first WCHA regular season title under Gwozdecky, as well as a second conference championship. Unfortunately, the Pioneers found themselves pitted against Michigan in the first game, and lost to the Maize and Blue yet again. The Pioneers lost in the first round of the WCHA tournament each of the next two years, but their record in 2004 was good enough to snag the #2 seed despite the loss.

==== Back-to-back titles ====
DU was able to defeat Gwozdecky's previous team, Miami, in a close game before advancing to face North Dakota in the West Regional Final. The top team in the nation held Denver off the scoresheet and out shot the Pioneers 23–13 in the opening two periods but the Fighting Sioux could not get the puck past Adam Berkhoel. The two teams remained scoreless until just 2:29 remained in regulation when Luke Fulghum deflected a puck into the net and sent the Pioneers into the Frozen Four for the first time in 18 years. Denver met Minnesota–Duluth in the semifinal and looked like were outmatched when the Bulldogs scored twice in the first five minutes of the game. Even when Denver cut the lead in half a second power play goal by 2004 Hobey Baker winner Junior Lessard followed soon thereafter. The Pioneers, however, were not deterred and came out firing in the third, tying the score in less than four minutes and adding another two goals before the period was half over. Duluth was so stunned by the comeback that they could only muster 6 shots in the period as Denver took the game to make their first national championship since their vacated appearance in 1973. With Maine as the only obstacle left in their path, Denver put up in front of Adam Berkhoel and allowed only 24 shots to reach their goalie, including none during a 6-on-3 power play advantage in the last minute and a half of the game. Berkhoel earned the shutout, making the lone goal from Gabe Gauthier in the first as the winner.

After winning their first title in 35 years Denver raised their game, tying Colorado College for the WCHA crown and producing the #2 offense in the country. In the WCHA tournament, however, it was their defense that led the way. With rookie goaltender Peter Mannino standing on his head for two shutouts, the Pioneers allowed only two goals in four games, winning three one-goal games to take the conference championship. DU earned the #2 overall seed and had to survive a scare from Bemidji State in their first game. After allowing 3 to the much weaker Beavers, Glenn Fisher was benched in favor of Mannino for the remaining three games and the Pioneers cruised to the championship game with 4–2 and 6–2 wins. In the Final Denver met North Dakota for the fourth time, matching the record for championship meetings with Michigan and Colorado College. The two teams exchanged goals in the first but future NHLer Paul Stastny put the Pioneers into the lead with a power play marker just after the midpoint. With their season on the line North Dakota began an onslaught on the DU net, firing 23 shots in the third but Mannino was equal to the take and kept everything out. The Pioneers scored twice in the third to put the game away and take their seventh national championship.

==== Playoff disappointments ====
The next season brought Denver its first Hobey Baker winner in Matt Carle but the team floundered in the first round of the WCHA tournament and this time their record was not good enough to get them into the championship. After another first round exit the following year Denver righted the ship and won the WCHA tournament in 2008. In the first round they found themselves facing conference rival Wisconsin, only the second time in NCAA history that two teams from the same conference met in the opening round. Despite being favored in the game the Pioneers were beaten 2–6 and sent home disappointed. The Pioneers would return to the tournament each of the next five seasons, but the results were much the same, losing in the first round four times and thoroughly dismissed by North Dakota in the 2011 regionals. Despite the regular season success the early playoff exits, coupled with a contract structure dispute, these results led Denver to fire their head coach in 2013, only 17 wins away from tying Murray Armstrong's program record.

=== New coach, new conference, new championship ===
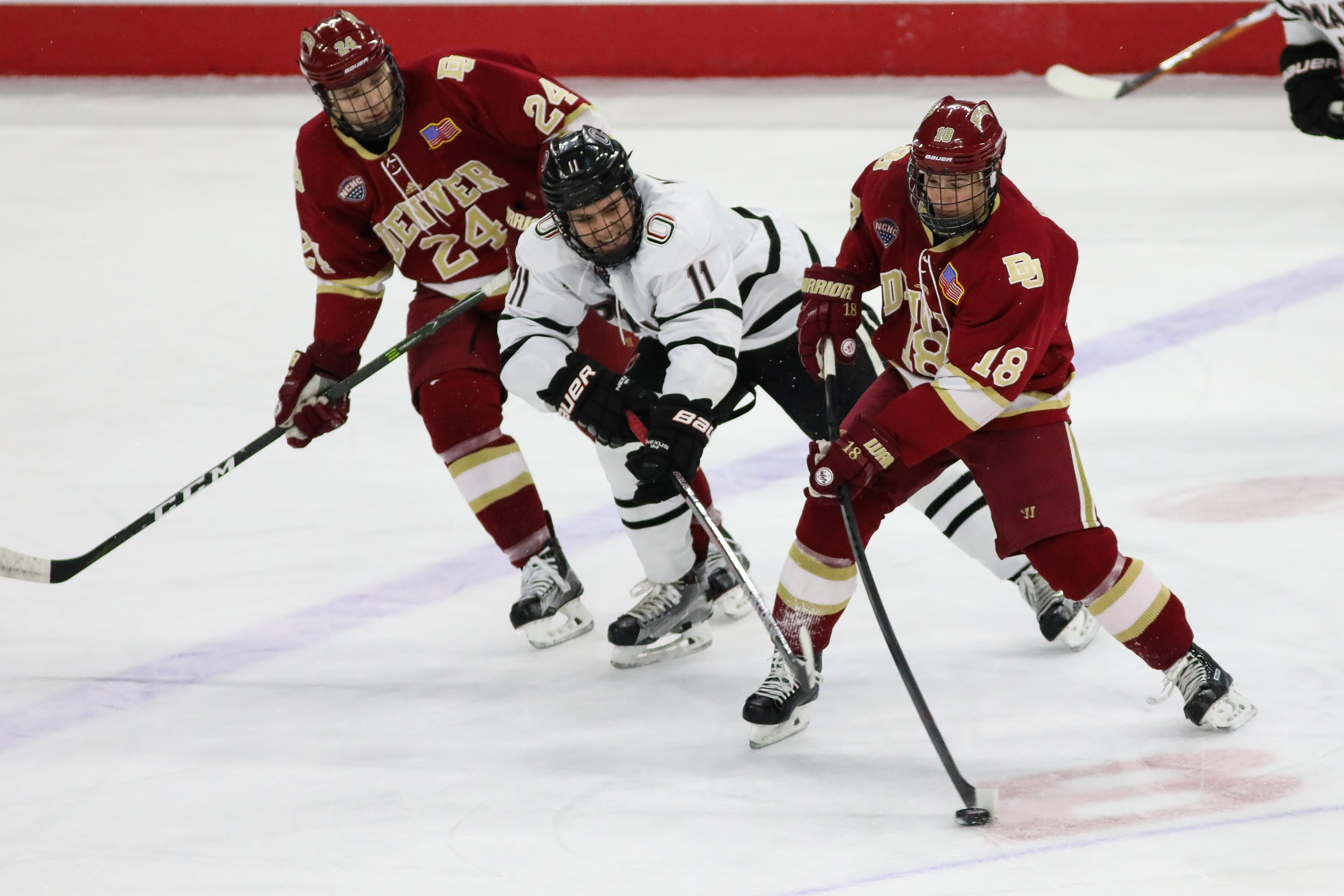
A game between Denver and Omaha in 2017

Gwozdecky's firing coincided with the founding of the NCHC, a power conference that was created due to Wisconsin and Minnesota leaving to restart the Big Ten hockey division. Denver was accompanied by all of its traditional rivals and began its tenure under Jim Montgomery but finishing 6th in the 8-team conference. Despite their lackluster start the Pioneers were provided with an opportunity by facing weaker-than-expected opposition in the final two games and were able to win the inaugural championship, as they had done with the WCHA 54 years earlier. The Pioneer's NCAA run was predictably short-lived but the team seemed to have found new life under Montgomery's watch which they demonstrated by increasing their win total in each of the next three years. In addition they won progressively more tournament games, reaching the Frozen Four in 2016 before winning their 8th National Championship in the 2017 season along with getting their second Hobey Baker Award, this one going to Will Butcher. After the team won its second NCHC tournament title in 2018, Montgomery left to join the Dallas Stars as head coach.

=== David Carle Era ===
DU replaced Montgomery with his former assistant, then 28-year-old David Carle. Carle took Denver to the 2019 Frozen Four in his rookie season, after first and second-round NCAA wins over Ohio State and American International, the Pioneers fell in the Frozen Four semi-finals to Cale Makar-led Massachusetts, 4–3 in overtime in Buffalo, New York.

In 2022, following NCAA Loveland Regional wins against UMass Lowell and Minnesota Duluth, David Carle and the Denver Pioneers entered the Frozen Four in Boston for the 18th time in school history. In the semi-finals, Denver played the University of Michigan, a team with a record seven first-round NHL Draft picks, including four of the first five picks the prior summer. Denver's Carter Savoie scored in overtime to secure a 3–2 victory, and advance the Pioneers to the National Championship game for their 12th time in program history. In the National Championship game, Denver failed to score until the third period against Minnesota State. However, Denver finally broke through adding 5 third period goals to clinch its 9th National Championship in program history.

In 2023, Denver finished the '22-'23 season with 30-10-0 overall, earned a spot in the NCAA Tournament as the fourth #1 seed. However, they succumbed to Cornell 2–0 in the opening Regional Semifinals.

==== #TENver ====
In 2024, Denver became the first NCAA Men's Ice Hockey team to reach 10 National Championships, breaking the tie at nine that the Pioneers had held with the University of Michigan. Playing as the #3 overall seed, they shutout top-overall seed Boston College, 2-0, to secure their 10th title. Denver was anchored by strong goalie play from Matt Davis who saved 35 shots in the decisive game.

== Season-by-season results ==
Source:

== Denver/Colorado College rivalry ==
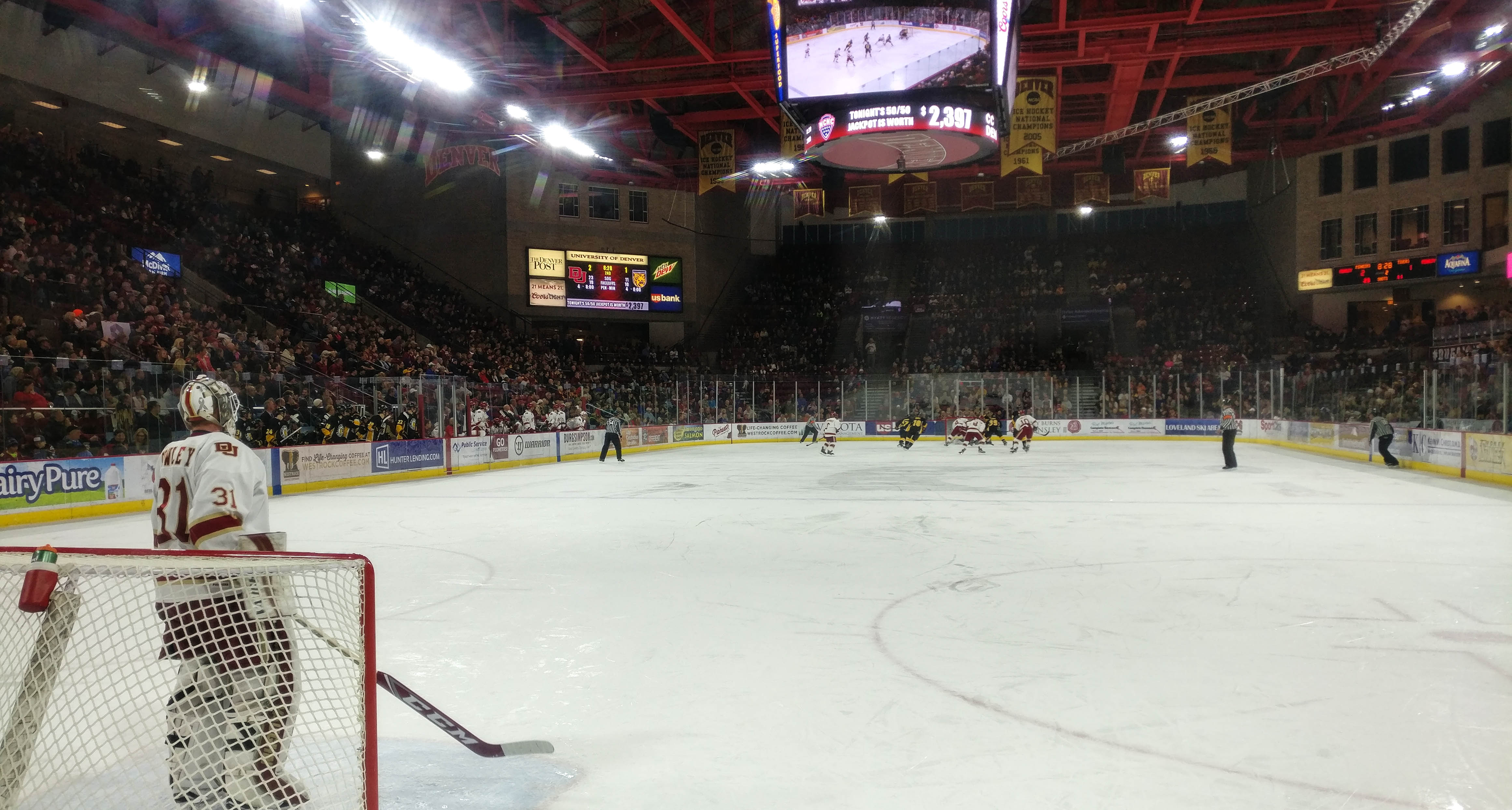
Game between the Denver Pioneers and Colorado College Tigers (Magness Arena – December 2016)

Of all the rivals that the Denver Pioneer's hockey program play against the most intense rivalry is that from Colorado College. Since Denver's hockey program started in 1949 the two schools have played at least four times a season. In the 1993–94 season a gold pan trophy was added as a reward for the winning team thus the rivalry has been dubbed the Battle for the Gold Pan.

== Head coaches ==
David Carle is the current head coach of Denver hockey, hired in May 2018.

As of the end of the 2024–25 season

Tenure	Coach	Years	Record	Pct.
1949–1951	Vern Turner	2	15–24–1	.388
1951–1956	Neil Celley	6	81–43–6	.646
1956–1977	Murray Armstrong	21	460–215–31	.674
1977–1981	Marshall Johnston	4	89–63–7	.582
1981–1990	Ralph Backstrom	9	182–174–14	.511
1990–1994	Frank Serratore	4	49–92–9	.357
1994–2013	George Gwozdecky	19	443–267–64	.614
2013–2018	Jim Montgomery	5	125–57–26	.663
2018–Present	David Carle	7	179–74–17	.694
Totals	9 coaches	76 seasons	1,623–1028–175	.605

== Awards and honors ==
=== Hockey Hall of Fame ===
- Craig Patrick (2001)
- Glenn Anderson (2008)

=== United States Hockey Hall of Fame ===
- Craig Patrick (1996)

=== NCAA ===
==== Individual awards ====
Hobey Baker Award

- Matt Carle: 2006
- Will Butcher: 2017

Spencer Penrose Award

- Murray Armstrong: 1961
- Ralph Backstrom: 1986
- George Gwozdecky: 2005
- Jim Montgomery: 2017

Tim Taylor Award

- Joey LaLeggia: 2012

Mike Richter Award

- Tanner Jaillet: 2017

NCAA Division I Ice Hockey Scoring Champion

- Ed Beers: 1982
- Bobby Brink: 2022

Tournament Most Outstanding Player

- Murray Massier; 1958
- Bill Masterton; 1961
- Gerry Powers; 1968
- Keith Magnuson; 1969
- Adam Berkhoel; 2004
- Peter Mannino; 2005
- Jarid Lukosevicius; 2017
- Michael Benning; 2022
- Matt Davis; 2024
- Johnny Hicks; 2026

==== All-Americans ====
AHCA First Team All-Americans

- 1951–52: Eddie Miller, F
- 1957–58: Ed Zemrau, F
- 1959–60: Marty Howe, D; George Konik, F; Bill Masterton, F
- 1960–61: George Kirkwood, D; Marty Howe, D; Grant Munro, D; Jerry Walker, F; Bill Masterton, F
- 1962–63: Bill Staub, F
- 1964–65: Wayne Smith, D
- 1965–66: Wayne Smith, D
- 1966–67: Jim Wiste, F
- 1967–68: Keith Magnuson, D; Jim Wiste, F
- 1968–69: Keith Magnuson, D; George Morrison, F
- 1969–70: George Morrison, F
- 1970–71: Mike Christie, D; Vic Venasky, F
- 1971–72: Tom Peluso, F
- 1972–73: Ron Grahame, G; Rob Palmer, F
- 1977–78: Ernie Glanville, G; Doug Berry, F
- 1986–87: Dallas Gaume, F
- 2003–04: Ryan Caldwell, D
- 2004–05: Matt Carle, D
- 2005–06: Matt Carle, D
- 2009–10: Marc Cheverie, G; Patrick Wiercioch, D; Rhett Rakhshani, F
- 2013–14: Sam Brittain, G
- 2014–15: Joey LaLeggia, D
- 2016–17: Will Butcher, D; Henrik Borgström, F
- 2017–18: Henrik Borgström, F; Troy Terry, F
- 2019–20: Ian Mitchell, F
- 2021–22: Bobby Brink, F
- 2023–24: Zeev Buium, D; Jack Devine, F

AHCA Second Team All-Americans

- 1985–86: Chris Olson, G; Jim Smith, F; Dwight Mathiasen, F
- 1988–89: Daryn McBride, F
- 1989–90: Dave Shields, F
- 1998–99: Paul Comrie, F
- 2001–02: Wade Dubielewicz, G
- 2004–05: Brett Skinner, D
- 2005–06: Paul Stastny, F
- 2007–08: Chris Butler, D
- 2011–12: Jason Zucker, F
- 2012–13: Juho Olkinuora, G
- 2013–14: Joey LaLeggia, D
- 2014–15: Trevor Moore, F
- 2015–16: Will Butcher, D
- 2016–17: Tanner Jaillet, G
- 2017–18: Tanner Jaillet, G
- 2022–23: Michael Benning, D; Carter Mazur, F; Massimo Rizzo, F
- 2023–24: Massimo Rizzo, F

=== MCHL/WIHL/WCHA ===
==== Individual awards ====
Most Valuable Player/Player of the Year

- Jerry Walker, F; 1961
- Keith Magnuson, D; 1968
- Ron Grahame, G; 1973
- Dallas Gaume, C; 1986
- Matt Carle, D; 2006
- Marc Cheverie, G; 2010

Defensive Player of the Year

- Aaron MacKenzie, 2003
- Ryan Caldwell, 2004
- Matt Carle, 2006

Goaltender of the Year

- George Kirkwood: 1960, 1961
- Buddy Blom: 1964
- Gerry Powers: 1968
- Ron Grahame: 1973
- Ernie Glanville: 1978
- Wade Dubielewicz: 2001, 2002
- Marc Cheverie: 2010

Student-Athlete of the Year

- Dave Shields, C: 1990
- Brian Konowalchuk, C: 1994
- Petri Gunther, D: 1997
- Connor James, C: 2004
- Ted O'Leary, F: 2006
- J. P. Testwuide, D: 2009

Sophomore/Freshman/Rookie of the Year

- George Kirkwood, G: 1960
- Jack Wilson, D: 1964
- Keith Magnuson, D: 1967
- George Morrison, LW: 1969
- Craig Redmond, D: 1982
- Dave Shields, C: 1987
- Rick Berens, F: 1988
- Paul Stastny, C: 2005
- Jason Zucker, LW: 2011
- Joey LaLeggia, D: 2012

Coach of the Year

- Murray Armstrong: 1961, 1968
- Marshall Johnston: 1978
- Ralph Backstrom: 1986
- George Gwozdecky: 1995, 2002, 2005, 2010

Most Valuable Player in Tournament

- Stephen Wagner: 1999
- Wade Dubielewicz: 2002

==== All-Conference ====
First Team All-MCHL/WIHL/WCHA

- 1951–52: Don Burgess, D; Eddie Miller, D
- 1952–53: Eddie Miller, D
- 1957–58: Ed Zemrau, D
- 1959–60: George Kirkwood, G; Marty Howe, D; Bill Masterton, F
- 1960–61: George Kirkwood, G; Marty Howe, D; George Konik, D; Bill Masterton, F; Jerry Walker, F
- 1961–62: Jack Wilson, D
- 1962–63: Bill Staub, F
- 1963–64: Bill Staub, F
- 1964–65: Wayne Smith, D
- 1965–66: Wayne Smith, D
- 1966–67: Keith Magnuson, D; Jim Wiste, F
- 1967–68: Keith Magnuson, D; Jim Wiste, F
- 1968–69: Keith Magnuson, D; George Morrison, F
- 1969–70: George Morrison, F
- 1970–71: Mike Christie, D
- 1971–72: Tom Peluso, F
- 1972–73: Ron Grahame, G; Bruce Affleck, D; Rob Palmer, F; Peter McNab, F
- 1977–78: Ernie Glanville, G; Doug Berry, F
- 1981–82: Ed Beers, F
- 1983–84: Jim Leavins, D
- 1985–86: Dallas Gaume, F
- 1988–89: Daryn McBride, F
- 1989–90: Dave Shields, F
- 1998–99: Paul Comrie, F
- 2001–02: Wade Dubielewicz, G
- 2002–03: Aaron MacKenzie, D
- 2004–05: Matt Carle, D; Brett Skinner, D
- 2005–06: Matt Carle, D; Paul Stastny, F
- 2009–10: Marc Cheverie, G; Patrick Wiercioch, D; Rhett Rakhshani, F
- 2011–12: Joey LaLeggia, D

Second Team All-MCHL/WIHL/WCHA

- 1951–52: Bill Abbott, F
- 1952–53: Bill Abbott, F
- 1953–54: Bill Abbott, D; Jack Smith, F
- 1954–55: Bill Abbott, D; Jack Smith, F
- 1955–56: Ed Zemrau, D
- 1957–58: Murray Massier, F
- 1959–60: George Konik, D; John MacMillan, F
- 1961–62: Trent Beatty, F
- 1962–63: Jack Wilson, D; Dominic Fragomeni, F
- 1963–64: Buddy Blom, G; Wayne Smith, D; Jim Kenning, D
- 1967–68: Gerry Powers, G; Cliff Koroll, F
- 1968–69: Gerry Powers, G; Tom Miller, F
- 1969–70: Tom Gilmore, F
- 1970–71: Vic Venasky, F
- 1973–74: Bruce Affleck, D
- 1976–77: Greg Woods, D
- 1977–78: Greg Woods, D; Lex Hudson, D; Perry Schnarr, F
- 1980–81: Ken Berry, F
- 1985–86: Tom Allen, G; Dwight Mathiasen, F
- 1987–88: Daryn McBride, F
- 1989–90: Eric Murano, F
- 1994–95: Sinuhe Wallinheimo, G
- 1995–96: Antti Laaksonen, F
- 2000–01: Wade Dubielewicz, G
- 2002–03: Wade Dubielewicz, G
- 2003–04: Ryan Caldwell, D
- 2004–05: Gabe Gauthier, F
- 2007–08: Chris Butler, D
- 2008–09: Marc Cheverie, G; Patrick Wiercioch, D
- 2009–10: Tyler Ruegsegger, F
- 2010–11: Matt Donovan, D; Jason Zucker, F; Drew Shore, F
- 2011–12: Jason Zucker, F; Drew Shore, F
- 2012–13: Juho Olkinuora, G; Joey LaLeggia, D

Third Team All-WCHA

- 1996–97: Jim Mullin, G
- 1997–98: Paul Comrie, F
- 1998–99: James Patterson, F
- 2001–02: Adam Berkhoel, G; Aaron MacKenzie, D; Connor James, F
- 2002–03: Kevin Doell, F
- 2003–04: Adam Berkhoel, G; Gabe Gauthier, F
- 2005–06: Ryan Dingle, F
- 2006–07: Ryan Dingle, F
- 2007–08: Peter Mannino, G; Tyler Bozak, F
- 2008–09: Anthony Maiani, F; Rhett Rakhshani, F
- 2009–10: Joe Colborne, F

WCHA All-Rookie Team

- 1997–98: Mark Rycroft, F
- 2000–01: Ryan Caldwell, D
- 2003–04: Matt Carle, D
- 2004–05: Paul Stastny, F
- 2005–06: Chris Butler, D
- 2007–08: Tyler Bozak, F
- 2008–09: Patrick Wiercioch, D; Joe Colborne, F
- 2009–10: Matt Donovan, D
- 2010–11: Sam Brittain, G; David Makowski, D; Jason Zucker, F
- 2011–12: Juho Olkinuora, G; Joey LaLeggia, D
- 2012–13: Nolan Zajac, D

=== NCHC ===
==== Individual awards ====
Player of the Year

- Joey LaLeggia; 2015
- Will Butcher; 2017
- Henrik Borgström; 2018
- Bobby Brink; 2022

Rookie of the Year

- Danton Heinen; 2015
- Henrik Borgström; 2017
- Carter Mazur; 2022
- Zeev Buium; 2024

Goaltender of the Year

- Sam Brittain; 2014
- Tanner Jaillet; 2017, 2018
- Magnus Chrona; 2023

Forward of the Year

- Trevor Moore; 2015
- Danton Heinen; 2016
- Henrik Borgström; 2018
- Bobby Brink; 2022

Defenseman/Defensive Defenseman of the Year

- Joey LaLeggia; 2014, 2015
- Justin Lee; 2023
- Sean Behrens; 2024

Offensive Defenseman of the Year

- Joey LaLeggia; 2014, 2015
- Will Butcher; 2017
- Michael Benning; 2023
- Zeev Buium; 2024, 2025
- Eric Pohlkamp; 2026

Scholar-Athlete of the Year

- Gabe Levin; 2016

Tournament MVP

- Daniel Doremus; 2014
- Tanner Jaillet; 2018

==== All-Conference ====
First Team All-NCHC

- 2013–14: Sam Brittain, G; Joey LaLeggia, D
- 2014–15: Joey LaLeggia, D; Trevor Moore, F
- 2015–16: Will Butcher, D; Danton Heinen, F
- 2016–17: Tanner Jaillet, G; Will Butcher, D
- 2017–18: Tanner Jaillet, G; Henrik Borgström, F
- 2019–20: Ian Mitchell, D
- 2021–22: Bobby Brink, F
- 2022–23: Magnus Chrona, G; Michael Benning, D; Massimo Rizzo, F
- 2023–24: Zeev Buium, D; Jack Devine, F
- 2024–25: Zeev Buium, D; Jack Devine, F

Second Team All-NCHC

- 2014–15: Danton Heinen, F
- 2016–17: Henrik Borgström, F; Dylan Gambrell, F
- 2017–18: Troy Terry, F; Dylan Gambrell, F
- 2019–20: Emilio Pettersen, F
- 2021–22: Michael Benning, D; Carter Savoie, F
- 2022–23: Carter Mazur, F
- 2023–24: Shai Buium, D; Massimo Rizzo, F
- 2024–25: Aidan Thompson, F

Third Team All-NCHC

- 2024–25: Sam Harris, F; Carter King, F; Eric Pohlkamp, D

NCHC All-Rookie Team

- 2013–14: Trevor Moore, F
- 2014–15: Danton Heinen, F
- 2015–16: Dylan Gambrell, F
- 2016–17: Michael Davies, D; Henrik Borgström, F
- 2017–18: Ian Mitchell, D
- 2019–20: Magnus Chrona, G; Bobby Brink, F
- 2021–22: Sean Behrens, D; Shai Buium, D; Carter Mazur, F; Massimo Rizzo, F
- 2023–24: Zeev Buium, D; Miko Matikka, F

== Olympians ==
This is a list of Denver hockey alumni who were a part of an Olympic team.

Name	Position	Denver Tenure	Team	Year	Finish
Glenn Anderson	Right Wing	1978–1979	Canada	1980	6th
Ken Berry	Right Wing	1978–1979, 1980–1981	Canada	1980 1988	6th, 4th
Kevin Dineen	Right Wing	1981–1983	Canada	1984, 2014*	4th, Gold
Marshall Johnston	Defenseman	1960–1963	Canada	1964 1968	4th, Bronze
Antti Laaksonen	Forward	1993–1997	Finland	2006	Silver
Derek Mayer	Defenseman	1985–1988	Canada	1994	Silver
Ronald Naslund	Forward	1962–1965	(United States) USA	1972	Silver
Craig Patrick	Right Wing	1966–1970	(United States) USA	1980, 2002†	Gold, Silver
Craig Redmond	Defenseman	1982–1983	Canada	1984	4th
Nick Shore	Center	2010–2013	(United States) USA	2022	5th
Paul Stastny	Center	2004–2006	(United States) USA	2010, 2014	Silver, 4th
Troy Terry	Right Wing	2015–2018	(United States) USA	2018	7th
David Tomassoni	Forward	1972–1975	(Italy) ITA	1984	9th

† Craig Patrick was an assistant coach for the 1980 team and the general manager for the 2002 team.
* Kevin Dineen was head coach of the Gold Medal Winning Canadian women's team at the 2014 Winter Games in Sochi, Russia.

== Statistical leaders ==
=== Career points leaders ===
Player	Years	GP	G	A	Pts	PIM
Dallas Gaume	1982–1986	145	78	188	266	
Dwight Mathiasen	1983–1986	123	90	108	198	
John McMillan	1983–1987	152	69	127	196	
Bill Masterton	1958–1961	89	66	130	196	
Rick Berens	1987–1991	159	94	86	180	
Doug Berry	1975–1978	119	65	115	180	
Dave Shields	1986–1990	146	71	108	179	
Ed Hayes	1969–1973	140	74	103	177	
Greg Woods	1975–1979	161	51	125	176	
Peter McNab	1970–1973	105	78	92	170	

=== Career goaltending leaders ===
GP = Games played; Min = Minutes played; W = Wins; L = Losses; T = Ties; GA = Goals against; SO = Shutouts; SV% = Save percentage; GAA = Goals against average

Minimum 30 games

Player	Years	GP	Min	W	L	T	GA	SO	SV%	GAA
Devin Cooley	2017–2020	32	1,708	15	9	4	55	6	.927	1.93
Tanner Jaillet	2014–2018	135	7,560	82	27	16	257	9	.925	1.94
Evan Cowley	2013–2017	52	2,469	23	15	3	79	6	.933	2.04
Wade Dubielewicz	1999–2003	85	4,629	44	26	6	170	8	.923	2.20
George Kirkwood	1959–1961	66	—	57	5	4	—	6	.904	2.20
Magnus Chrona	2019–2023	114	6,686	73	34	5	245	13	.914	2.20

Statistics current through the end of the 2022–23 season.

== Denver Athletic Hall of Fame ==
The following is a list of people associated with the Denver men's ice hockey program who were elected into the Denver Athletic Hall of Fame (induction date in parentheses).

- Murray Armstrong (1996)
- Keith Magnuson (1996)
- Bill Masterton (1996)
- Ron Grahame (1997)
- George Konik (1997)
- Jerry Walker (1999)
- Dallas Gaume (2000)
- Eddie Miller (2000)
- Jim Wiste (2000)
- 1960 Championship Team (2000)
- Marty Howe (2001)
- Craig Patrick (2001)
- Marshall Johnston (2002)
- Cliff Koroll (2003)
- 1961 Championship Team (2004)
- Gerry Powers (2005)
- George Kirkwood (2006)
- 1968 Championship Team (2006)
- 1958 Championship Team (2008)
- 1969 Championship Team (2010)
- Ed Zemrau (2012)
- George Morrison (2012)
- John MacMillan (2014)
- 2004 Championship Team (2014)

== Current roster ==
As of August 12, 2025.

No.	Nat.	Player	Class	Pos	Height	Weight	DoB	Hometown	Previous team	NHL rights
2	(United States)	Tory Pitner	Sophomore	D	6' 1" (1.85 m)	183 lb (83 kg)	2006-03-06	Greenwich, Connecticut	Youngstown Phantoms (USHL)	COL, 185th overall 2024
3	(Canada)	Cale Ashcroft	Junior	D	5' 11" (1.8 m)	190 lb (86 kg)	2004-08-05	St. Albert, Alberta	Tri-City Storm (USHL)	—
5	(United States)	Garrett Brown	Junior	D	6' 3" (1.91 m)	200 lb (91 kg)	2004-04-04	San Jose, California	Waterloo Black Hawks (USHL)	WPG, 99th overall 2022
6	(United States)	Alec Whipple	Sophomore	D	6' 0" (1.83 m)	181 lb (82 kg)	2004-02-09	Far Hills, New Jersey	Trail Smoke Eaters (BCHL)	—
8	(United States)	Kristian Epperson	Freshman	F	6' 0" (1.83 m)	185 lb (84 kg)	2006-05-16	Mequon, Wisconsin	Saginaw Spirit (OHL)	LAK, 88th overall 2025
9	(Canada)	Boston Buckberger	Junior	D	5' 11" (1.8 m)	180 lb (82 kg)	2003-06-01	Saskatoon, Saskatchewan	Lincoln Stars (USHL)	—
10	(Canada)	Brady Milburn	Freshman	F	6' 1" (1.85 m)	194 lb (88 kg)	2005-03-03	Kamloops, British Columbia	Kamloops (BCHL)	—
11	(Finland)	Samu Salminen	Senior	F	6' 2" (1.88 m)	182 lb (83 kg)	2003-04-09	Helsinki, Finland	Connecticut (HEA)	NJD, 68th overall 2021
12	(United States)	Sam Harris	Junior	F	6' 1" (1.85 m)	190 lb (86 kg)	2003-10-14	San Diego, California	Sioux Falls Stampede (USHL)	MTL, 133rd overall 2023
13	(United States)	Hagen Burrows	Sophomore	F	6' 3" (1.91 m)	176 lb (80 kg)	2005-10-13	Orono, Minnesota	Sioux City Musketeers (USHL)	TBL, 128th overall 2024
14	(Canada)	Rieger Lorenz	Senior	F	6' 2" (1.88 m)	192 lb (87 kg)	2004-03-30	Calgary, Alberta	Okotoks Oilers (AJHL)	MIN, 56th overall 2022
15	(Canada)	Eric Jamieson	Freshman	D	6' 3" (1.91 m)	205 lb (93 kg)	2005-07-15	Calgary, Alberta	Everett Silvertips (WHL)	CGY, 177th overall 2024
16	(Canada)	Kyle Chyzowski	Freshman	F	5' 10" (1.78 m)	170 lb (77 kg)	2004-08-16	Surrey, British Columbia	Portland Winterhawks (WHL)	—
17	(United States)	Peter LaJoy	Junior	F	5' 7" (1.7 m)	165 lb (75 kg)	2002-02-27	Evergreen, Colorado	Danbury Jr. Hat Tricks (NAHL)	—
18	(United States)	Payton Nelson	Freshman	F	5' 11" (1.8 m)	174 lb (79 kg)	2005-01-17	Centennial, Colorado	Salmon Arm Silverbacks (BCHL)	—
19	(United States)	Jake Fisher	Sophomore	F	6' 2" (1.88 m)	192 lb (87 kg)	2005-03-27	Woodbury, Minnesota	Fargo Force (USHL)	COL, 121st overall 2024
21	(Canada)	Kent Anderson	Senior	D	6' 3" (1.91 m)	205 lb (93 kg)	2003-11-13	Calgary, Alberta	Green Bay Gamblers (USHL)	—
22	(United States)	Brendan McMorrow	Freshman	F	6' 0" (1.83 m)	190 lb (86 kg)	2006-03-27	Lakeville, Minnesota	Waterloo Black Hawks (USHL)	LAK, 196th overall 2025
23	(United States)	Eric Pohlkamp	Junior	D	5' 11" (1.8 m)	205 lb (93 kg)	2004-03-23	Brainerd, Minnesota	Bemidji State (USHL)	SJS, 132nd overall 2023
24	(United States)	Kieran Cebrian	Junior	F	6' 2" (1.88 m)	195 lb (88 kg)	2003-03-31	Denver, Colorado	Tri-City Storm (USHL)	—
25	(Canada)	Clarke Caswell	Freshman	F	5' 11" (1.8 m)	181 lb (82 kg)	2006-02-02	Brandon, Manitoba	Swift Current Broncos (WHL)	SEA, 141st overall 2024
27	(United States)	James Reeder	Freshman	F	5' 10" (1.78 m)	168 lb (76 kg)	2005-10-06	Glenview, Illinois	Dubuque Fighting Saints (USHL)	LAK, 198th overall 2024
28	(Canada)	Reid Varkonyi	Freshman	F	5' 10" (1.78 m)	183 lb (83 kg)	2006-01-15	Sherwood Park, Alberta	Sioux Falls Stampede (USHL)	—
29	(Canada)	Quentin Miller	Freshman	G	6' 3" (1.91 m)	187 lb (85 kg)	2004-12-23	Montréal, Quebec	Chilliwack Chiefs (BCHL)	MTL, 128th overall 2023
30	(Canada)	Paxton Geisel	Junior	G	6' 1" (1.85 m)	190 lb (86 kg)	2004-01-18	Estevan, Saskatchewan	Muskegon Lumberjacks (USHL)	—
31	(Canada)	Johnny Hicks	Freshman	G	5' 11" (1.8 m)	154 lb (70 kg)	2005-09-11	Kamloops, British Columbia	Victoria Royals (WHL)	—

== Pioneers in the NHL ==
As of July 1, 2025.

= NHL All-Star team	= NHL All-Star	= NHL All-Star and NHL All-Star team	= Hall of Famers

Player	Position	Team(s)	Years	Games	Stanley Cups
Bruce Affleck	Defenseman	STL, VAN, NYI	1974–1984	280	1^{^}
Glenn Anderson	Right Wing	EDM, TOR, NYR, STL	1980–1996	1,129	6
Erik Andersson	Left Wing	CGY	1997–1998	12	0
Ed Beers	Left Wing	CGY, STL	1981–1986	250	0
Beau Bennett	Right Wing	PIT, NJD, STL	2012–2018	200	1
Adam Berkhoel	Goaltender	ATL	2005–2006	9	0
Doug Berry	Center	COL	1979–1981	121	0
Ken Berry	Left Wing	EDM, VAN	1981–1989	55	0
Henrik Borgström	Center	FLA, CHI, WSH	2017–2023	111	0
Tyler Bozak	Center	TOR, STL	2009–2022	814	1
Lyle Bradley	Center	CAL, CLE	1973–1977	6	0
Rick Bragnalo	Center	WAS	1975–1979	145	0
Bobby Brink	Right Wing	PHI	2021–Present	146	0
Zeev Buium	Defenseman	MIN	2021–Present	0*	0
Mike Busniuk	Defenseman	PHI	1979–1981	143	0
Will Butcher	Defenseman	NJD, BUF	2017–2022	275	0
Chris Butler	Defenseman	BUF, CGY, STL	2008–2019	407	0^{&}
Ryan Caldwell	Defenseman	NYI, PHO	2005–2008	4	0
Matt Carle	Defenseman	SJS, TBL, PHI, NSH	2005–2017	730	0
Mike Christie	Defenseman	CAL, CLE, COR, VAN	1974–1981	412	0
Magnus Chrona	Goaltender	SJS	2023–2024	9	0
Joe Colborne	Center	TOR, CGY, COL	2010–2017	295	0
Paul Comrie	Center	EDM	1999–2000	15	0
Devin Cooley	Goaltender	SJS	2023–2024	6	0
Ed Cristofoli	Right Wing	MTL	1989–1990	9	0
Kevin Dineen	Right Wing	HFD, PHI, CAR, OTT, CBJ	1984–2003	1,188	1^{@}
Kevin Doell	Center	ATL	2007–2008	8	0
Matt Donovan	Defenseman	NYI, NSH	2011–2019	69	0
Wade Dubielewicz	Goaltender	NYI, CBJ, MIN	2003–2010	43	0
Dylan Gambrell	Center	SJS, OTT	2017–2023	233	0
Dallas Gaume	Center	HFD	1988–1989	4	0
Gabe Gauthier	Left Wing	LAK	2006–2008	8	0
Cole Guttman	Center	CHI	2022–2024	41	0
Danton Heinen	Center	BOS, ANA, PIT, VAN	2016–Present	566	0
Blake Hillman	Defenseman	CHI	2017–2018	4	0
Lex Hudson	Defenseman	PIT	1978–1979	2	0
Connor James	Center	LAK, PIT	2005–2009	16	0
Marshall Johnston	Defenseman	MNS, CAL	1967–1974	251	1^{#}
Chris Kenady	Right Wing	STL, NYR	1997–2000	7	0
George Konik	Defenseman	PIT	1967–1968	52	0
Cliff Koroll	Right Wing	CHI	1969–1980	814	0
Antti Laaksonen	Left Wing	BOS, MIN, COL	1998–2007	483	0

Player	Position	Team(s)	Years	Games	Stanley Cups
Mike Lampman	Left Wing	STL, VAN, WAS	1972–1977	96	0
Jim Leavins	Defenseman	DET, NYR	1985–1987	41	0
Pete LoPresti	Goaltender	MNS, EDM	1974–1981	175	0
Aaron MacKenzie	Defenseman	COL	2008–2009	5	0
John MacMillan	Right Wing	TOR, DET	1960–1965	104	2
Keith Magnuson	Defenseman	CHI	1969–1980	589	0
Peter Mannino	Goaltender	NYI, ATL, WPG	2008–2012	6	0
Tom Martin	Left Wing	WIN, HFD, MNS	1984–1990	92	0
Bill Masterton	Center	MNS	1967–1968	38	0
Dwight Mathiasen	Right Wing	PIT	1985–1988	33	0
Derek Mayer	Defenseman	OTT	1993–1994	17	0
Scott Mayfield	Left Wing	DET	2013–Present	535	0
Carter Mazur	Defenseman	NYI	2024–Present	1	0
Peter McNab	Center	BUF, BOS, VAN, NJD	1973–1987	954	0
Dakota Mermis	Defenseman	ARI, NJD, MIN, TOR, UTA	2017–Present	78	0
Paul Messier	Center	COR	1978–1979	9	0
Tom Miller	Center	DET, NYI	1970–1975	118	0
Ian Mitchell	Center	CHI, BOS	2020–Present	110	0
Trevor Moore	Forward	TOR, LAK	2018–Present	416	0
Gavin Morgan	Center	DAL	2003–2004	6	0
George Morrison	Left Wing	STL	1970–1972	115	0
Logan O'Connor	Forward	COL	2018–Present	343	1
Rob Palmer	Forward	CHI	1973–1976	16	0
Craig Patrick	Center	CAL, STL, KCS, WAS	1971–1979	401	2^{†}
Matt Pettinger	Left Wing	WAS, VAN, TBL	2000–2010	422	0
Lynn Powis	Center	CHI, KCS	1973–1975	130	0
Rich Preston	Center	CHI, NJD	1979–1987	580	0
Rhett Rakhshani	Right Wing	NYI	2010–2012	7	0
Craig Redmond	Defenseman	LAK, EDM	1984–1989	191	0
Mark Rycroft	Right Wing	STL, COL	2001–2007	226	0
Jim Shires	Left Wing	DET, STL, PIT	1970–1973	56	0
Drew Shore	Center	FLA, CGY, VAN, CAR	2012–2021	98	0
Nick Shore	Center	LAK, OTT, CGY, TOR, WPG	2014–2020	299	0
Brett Skinner	Defenseman	NYI	2008–2009	11	0
Wayne Smith	Defenseman	CHI	1966–1967	2	0
Paul Stastny	Center	COL, STL, WPG, VGK, CAR	2006–2023	1,145	0
Troy Terry	Right Wing	ANA	2017–Present	427	0
Brock Trotter	Center	MTL	2009–2010	2	0
Vic Venasky	Center	LAK	1972–1979	430	0
Patrick Wiercioch	Defenseman	OTT, COL	2010–2017	268	0
Jim Wiste	Center	CHI, VAN	1968–1971	52	0
Jason Zucker	Left Wing	MIN, PIT, ARI, NSH, BUF	2011–Present	770	0

† Patrick won two Stanley Cups as the general manager for the Pittsburgh Penguins. @ Dineen won his Stanley Cup as an assistant coach for the Chicago Blackhawks. # Johnston won his Stanley Cup as an executive for the Carolina Hurricanes. ^ Affleck won his Stanley Cup as an executive for the St. Louis Blues.

& Butler won his Stanley Cup as player for the St. Louis Blues. He did not play enough NHL games to merit engraving his name on trophy that year, but he did get to skate with the Cup in uniform after the final game. He then retired from hockey.

=== Retired NHL players stats ===
Note: This is a partial list of NHL players who attended DU (75 DU players have played in the NHL)

Forwards/Defensemen
Name	Seasons	GP	G	A	P	PIM
Bruce Affleck	7	280	14	66	80	86
Glenn Anderson	16	1,129	498	601	1,099	1,120
Erik Andersson	1	12	2	1	3	134
Ed Beers	5	250	94	116	210	256
Matt Carle	12	704	44	231	275	245
Mike Christie	7	412	15	101	116	550
Kevin Dineen	19	1,188	355	405	760	2,229
Marshall Johnston	7	251	14	52	66	58
Cliff Koroll	11	814	208	254	462	376
Antti Laaksonen	8	483	81	87	168	152
Keith Magnuson	11	589	14	125	139	1,442
Peter McNab	14	954	363	450	813	179
Bill Masterton^{1}	1	38	4	8	12	4
Craig Patrick	9	401	72	91	163	61
Rich Preston	8	580	127	164	291	348
Craig Redmond	5	191	16	68	84	134
Mark Rycroft	4	226	21	25	46	113
Vic Venasky	7	430	61	101	162	66

=== Active players stats ===
Active as of the end of the 2017–18 season

Forwards/Defensemen
Name	Seasons	GP	G	A	P	+/–	PIM
Paul Stastny	12	824	220	426	646	19	384
Tyler Bozak	9	594	136	229	365	−78	182
Joe Colborne	7	295	42	72	114	−38	144
Chris Butler	7	394	13	71	84	−30	187
Jason Zucker	7	330	97	75	172	33	124
Patrick Wiercioch	6	268	16	58	74	-5	138
Scott Mayfield	5	83	5	17	22	-14	98
Henrik Borgstrom	1	4	1	0	1	-1	0
Troy Terry	1	2	0	0	0	0	0
Beau Bennett	6	200	24	40	64	-2	52
Blake Hillman	1	4	1	0	1	-1	0
Will Butcher	1	81	5	39	44	1	8
Nick Shore	4	236	15	38	53	-15	78
Danton Heinen	2	85	16	31	47	7	18
Dylan Gambrell	1	3	0	0	0	-1	0

Notes:

- ^{1} Masterton suffered severe head trauma on January 13, 1968, during an NHL game when he fell to the ice and hit his head. He died two days later and became the first player to die as a direct result of an injury during an NHL game. The Bill Masterton Memorial Trophy is awarded annually to the NHL player who best personifies perseverance, sportsmanship and dedication to the game of ice hockey.

=== WHA ===
Several players also were members of WHA teams.

Player	Position	Team(s)	Years	Avco Cups
Doug Berry	Center	EDM	1978–1979	0
Tom Gilmore	Right wing	LAS, EDM	1972–1975	0
Ron Grahame	Goaltender	HOU	1973–1977	1
George Konik	Defenseman	MFS	1972–1973	0
Brian Morenz	Left wing	NYD, NYG, JK, SDM	1972–1976	0
George Morrison	Left wing	MFS, CAC	1972–1977	0
Craig Patrick	Center	MFS	1976–1977	0
Lynn Powis	Center	CAC, IND, WIN	1975–1978	1
Rich Preston	Right wing	HOU, WIN	1974–1979	2
Cal Sandbeck	Defenseman	EDM	1977–1979	0
Jim Wiste	Center	CLC, IND	1972–1976	0

* appeared in postseason games

== Arenas ==
=== University of Denver Arena (1948–1997) ===
University of Denver Arena (DU Arena) was a 5,237-seat multi-purpose arena on campus in Denver. In addition to serving as the Pioneers' home rink, it hosted several Frozen Fours. It was razed in 1997 to make room for the $75 million Magness Arena, (part of the Ritchie Center for Sports and Wellness) which opened in 1999.

Originally a U.S. Navy drill hall in northern Idaho, the structure was built in the early 1940s at Farragut Naval Training Station at Lake Pend Oreille. It was donated after World War II and reassembled on the DU campus in 1948–49 to house the new ice hockey program and served for nearly half a century.

The arena was refurbished in 1972–73 when the roof needed repairs, and 14 seven-ton steel trusses were added to shore up the roof. Additional patchwork renovations were added in the 1990s, prior to razing in 1997.

The best-known features of the arena were the steep bleacher balcony at the south end, and the 1970s rainbow painted on the north end wall. Famous hockey games held there include the NCAA ice hockey finals in 1961, 1964, and 1976.

=== Magness Arena (1999–present) ===
Also on campus, Magness Arena is a 7,200-seat multi-purpose collegiate sports arena, built from 1997 to 1999. It is part of the Daniel L. Ritchie Center for Sports & Wellness, DU's $84 million, 400,000-square-foot (37,000 m^{2}) sports complex, and is home to the Pioneers' ice hockey and basketball teams. The aging DU Arena and DU Fieldhouse were razed in 1997 to make way for the Ritchie Center, which includes Hamilton Gymnasium, utilized for less-attended basketball games.

The arena is named after cable television pioneer Bob Magness, who donated $10 million towards construction costs.

=== Other arenas ===
When the DU Arena roof was being fixed between 1972 and 1973, the Pioneers played home games at the Denver Coliseum.

When Magness Arena was under construction from 1997 to 1999, Denver played its home games at four different arenas along the Front Range: Denver Coliseum, McNichols Arena, Colorado Springs World Arena, and at the Air Force Academy's Cadet Ice Arena.

DU has also played a 2012 home exhibition game at Denver's Pepsi Center against the University of British Columbia, and played a league game in 2023, a 2–0 win over rival Colorado College before over 17,000 fans (an indoor DU home record) in the same building, now known as Ball Arena.

Denver's all-time record hockey crowd was the 2016 regular season outdoor NCHC game against Colorado College, called "The Battle on Blake" before over 35,000 fans at Denver's Coors Field baseball stadium, the most fans to ever see a home DU sporting event in Denver.

DU's previous indoor record home crowd was the 1995 Denver Cup final at McNichols Arena, where Denver defeated Colorado College before over 16,000 fans.

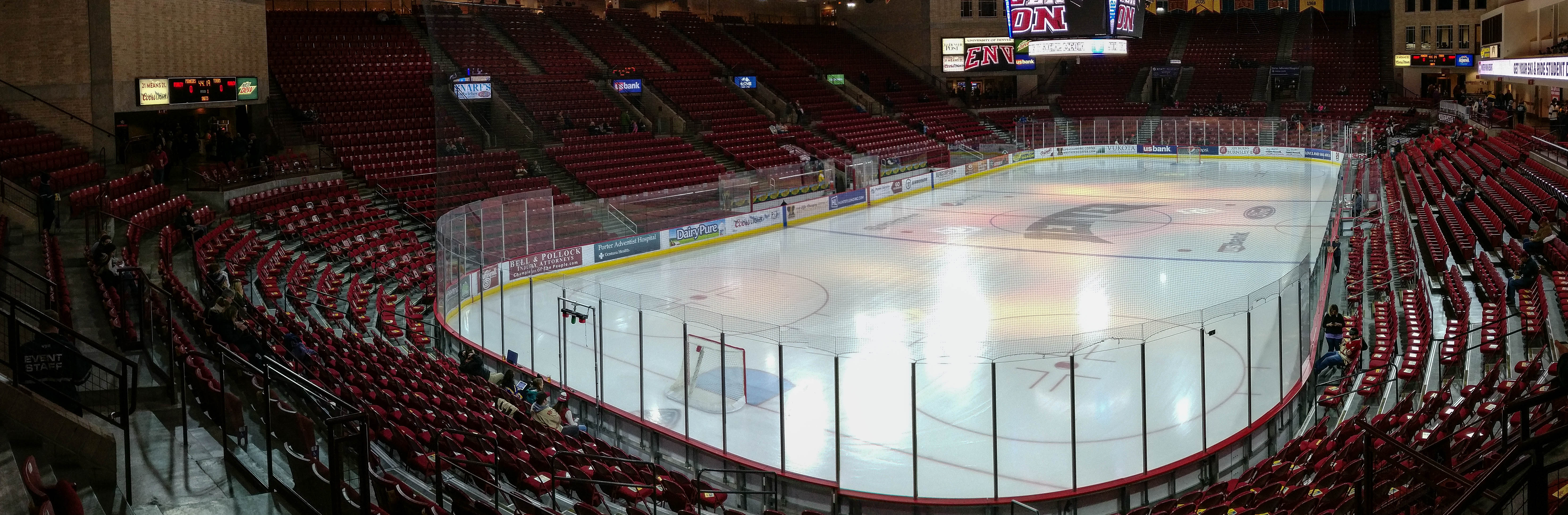
Magness Arena looking northwest

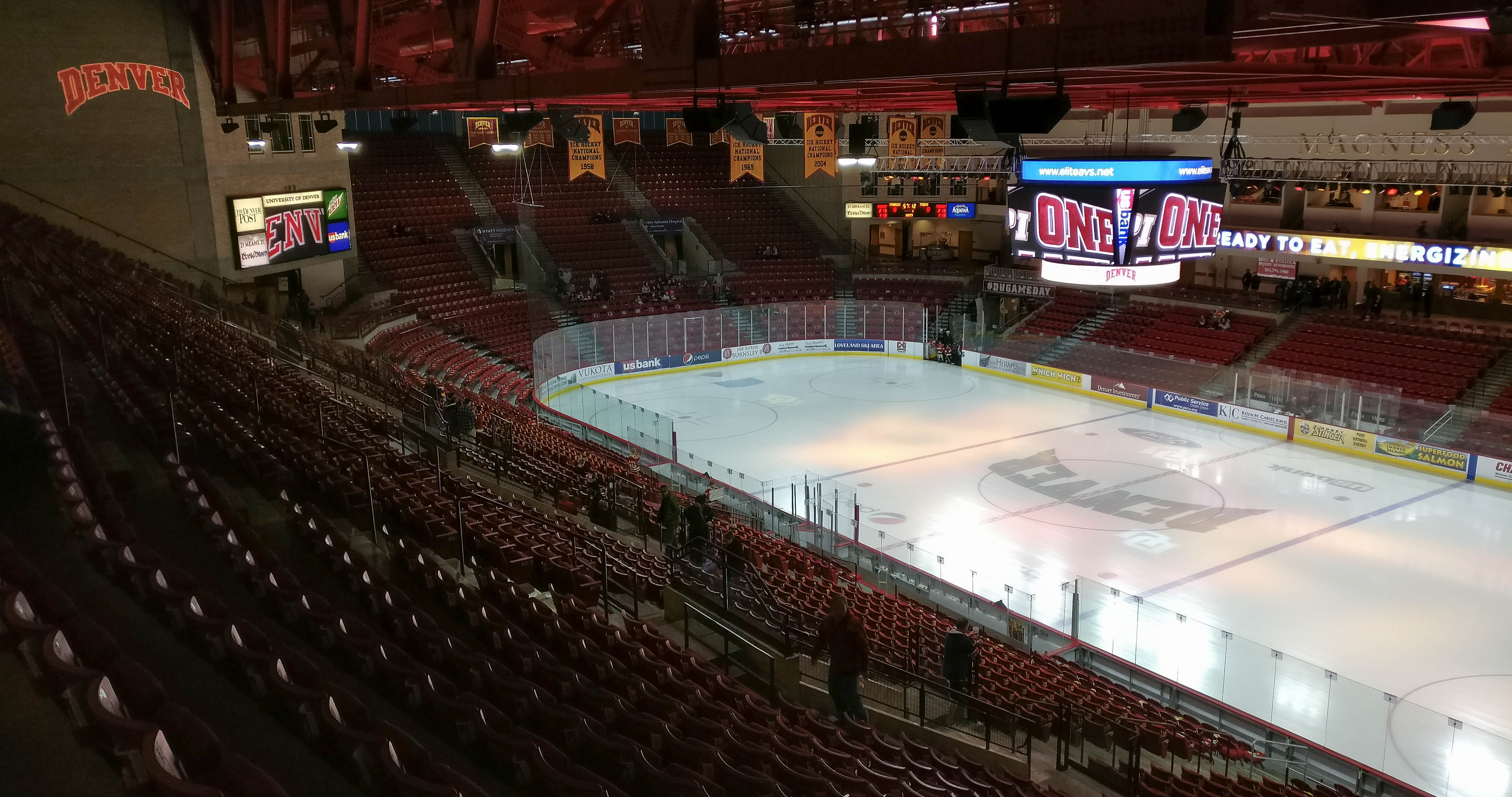
Magness arena looking north/northeast

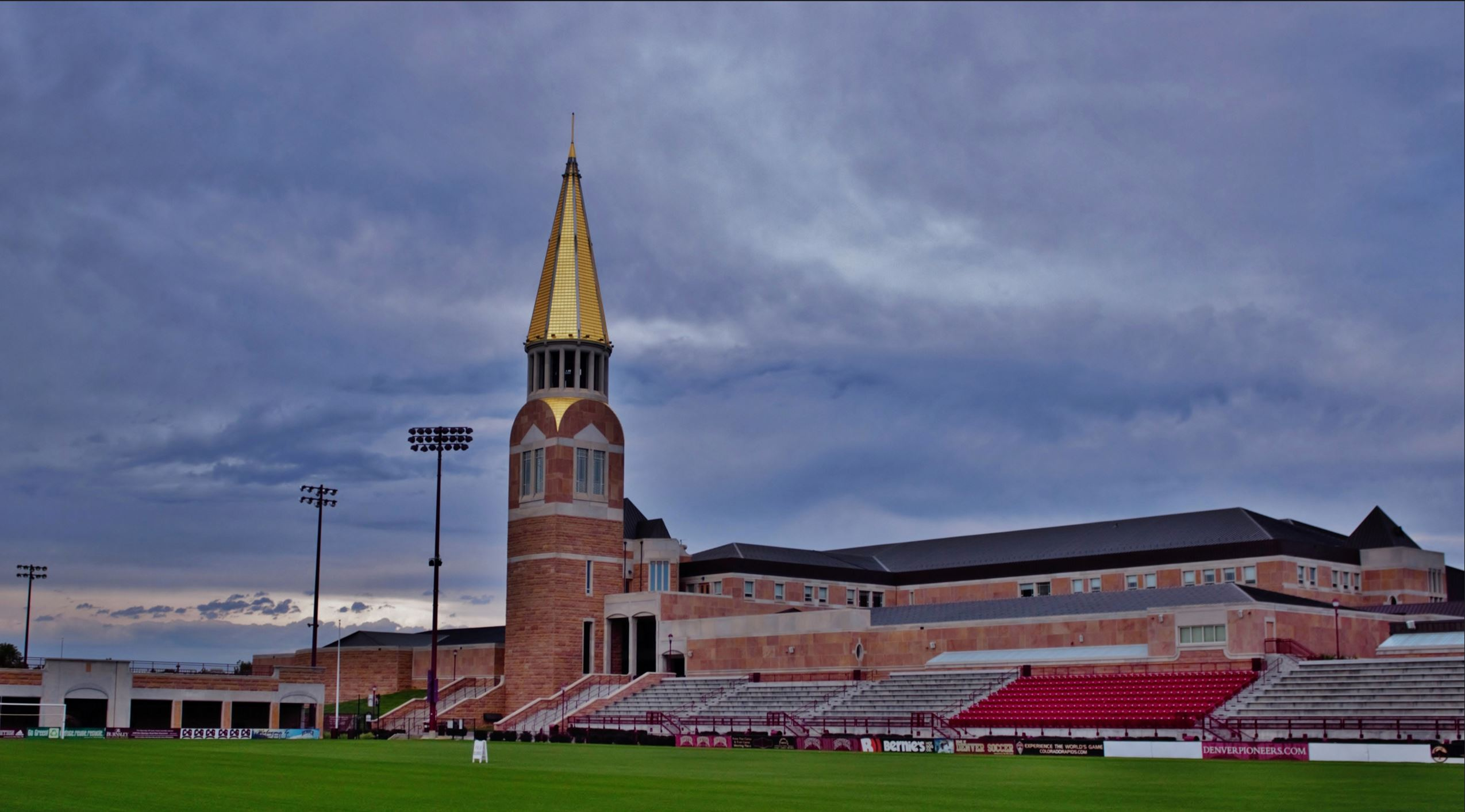
The Ritchie Center is home to many DU Pioneers athletics programs
