= 1958 NCAA men's ice hockey tournament =

College ice hockey tournament

- Teams: 4
- Finals site: Williams Arena, Minneapolis, Minnesota
- Champions: Denver Pioneers (1st title)
- Runner-up: North Dakota Fighting Sioux (1st title game)
- Semifinalists: Clarkson Golden Knights (2nd Frozen Four); Harvard Crimson (3rd Frozen Four)
- Winning coach: Murray Armstrong (1st title)
- MOP: Murray Massier (Denver)
- Attendance: 22,950

The 1958 NCAA Men's Ice Hockey Tournament was the culmination of the 1957–58 NCAA men's ice hockey season, the 11th such tournament in NCAA history. It was held between March 13 and 15, 1958, and concluded with Denver defeating North Dakota 6-2. All games were played at the Williams Arena in Minneapolis, Minnesota.

This was the first NCAA tournament to take place outside Colorado Springs, Colorado.

== Qualifying teams ==
Four teams qualified for the tournament, two each from the eastern and western regions. The two best WIHL teams and a Tri-State League representative received bids into the tournament as did one independent school.

East							West						
Seed	School	Conference	Record	Berth type	Appearance	Last bid	Seed	School	Conference	Record	Berth type	Appearance	Last bid
1	Clarkson	Tri-State League	16–2–0	At-Large	2nd	1957	1	North Dakota	WIHL	23–6–1	At-Large	1st	Never
2	Harvard	Independent	18–8–1	At-Large	3rd	1957	2	Denver	WIHL	22–10–2	At-Large	1st	Never

== Format ==
The Tri-State League team was seeded as the top eastern team while the WIHL champion with the greater winning percentage was given the top western seed. The second eastern seed was slotted to play the top western seed and vice versa. All games were played at the Williams Arena. All matches were Single-game eliminations with the semifinal winners advancing to the national championship game and the losers playing in a consolation game.

== Bracket ==
Semifinals; March 13–14
E1	Clarkson	2
W2	Denver	6
W1	North Dakota	9
E2	Harvard	1

National championship March 15
W2	Denver	6
W1	North Dakota	2
Third-place game
E1	Clarkson	5
E2	Harvard	1

Note: * denotes overtime period(s)

=== Semifinals ===
==== Clarkson vs. Denver ====
March 13	Clarkson	2 – 6	Denver	Williams Arena	Recap
No scoring		First period	09:24 - Wayne Klinck (Godfrey); 14:44 - Con Collie (Brown, Klinck); 17:33 - GW - Jim Brown (Zemrau, Sharp)
(Childerhose) Melvin Tomalty - 18:02		Second period	10:06 - Jon Godfrey (MacMillan); 14:29 - Wayne Klinck (Godfrey)
(Childerhose, Graham) Bob Van Lammers - 13:47		Third period	14:49 - Bruce Walker (Dingwall)
(26 saves) Ed MacDonald		Goalie stats	Rodney Schneck (10 saves)

==== North Dakota vs. Harvard ====
March 14	North Dakota	9 – 1	Harvard	Williams Arena	Recap
(King) Don Crouth - PP - 04:56 (Brunetta) Ron King - GW - 13:37		First period	10:26 - PP - Bruce Gillie (Owen)
(unassisted) Art Miller - 06:34 (Thomlinson) Ralph Lyndon - 09:20 (Paschke, Morelli) Jim Ridley - 09:49 (Williams, Morelli) Joe Armbruster - 18:30		Second period	No scoring
(King, Merrifield) Joe Poole - 10:32 (Morelli, Miller) Ralph Lyndon - 12:07 (LaFrance) Art Miller - 19:21		Third period	No scoring
(26 saves) Bob Peabody		Goalie stats	Harold Pratt (34 saves)

=== Consolation Game ===
==== Clarkson vs. Harvard ====
March 15	Clarkson	5 – 1	Harvard	Williams Arena	Recap
(Childerhose) Bob Van Lammers - 11:49		First period	No scoring
(Childerhose, Tomalty) Bob Van Lammers - 04:32 (Childerhose) Bob Van Lammers - 19:54		Second period	No scoring
(Howell) Don Gilchrist - 02:35 (unassisted) Bob Van Lammers - 09:48		Third period	14:17 - Terry O'Malley (Cleary)
(38 saves) Ed MacDonald		Goalie stats	Harold Pratt (14 saves)

=== National Championship ===
==== North Dakota vs. Denver ====
March 15	North Dakota	2 – 6	Denver	Williams Arena	Recap

Scoring summary
Period	Team	Goal	Assist(s)	Time	Score
1st	UND	Ed Thomlinson	Steenson	6:21	1–0 UND
2nd	DEN	Jim Brown	Sharp	27:18	1–1
2nd	DEN	Bruce Walker	Massier and Dingwall	30:39	2–1 DEN
2nd	DEN	Walt Dingwall – GW	Massier and Zemrau	30:58	3–1 DEN
3rd	UND	Joe Poole	King	45:21	3–2 DEN
3rd	DEN	Murray Massier	Klinck and Walker	47:18	4–2 DEN
3rd	DEN	Barry Sharp	Collie	53:49	5–2 DEN
3rd	DEN	Dennis Slinn	Massier and Godfrey	56:17	6–2 DEN
Penalty summary
Period	Team	Player	Penalty	Time	PIM
1st	DEN	Jim Brown	Holding		2:00
1st	UND	Ron King	High-sticking		2:00
1st	DEN	Ed Zemrau	Illegal check		2:00
1st	DEN	Ed Zemrau	Tripping		2:00
1st	DEN	Ed Zemrau	Interference		2:00
1st	UND	Ron King	Slashing		2:00
2nd	UND	Bill Steenson	Charging		2:00
2nd	DEN	Ed Zemrau	High-sticking		2:00
2nd	UND	Reg Morelli	High-sticking		2:00
2nd	UND	Ralph Lyndon	Elbowing		2:00
3rd	DEN	John Godfrey	Illegal check		2:00

Shots by period
Team	1	2	3	T
Denver	10	13	5	28
North Dakota	8	10	5	23

Goaltenders
Team	Name	Saves	Goals against	Time on ice
DEN	Rodney Schneck	21	2	
UND	Robert Peabody	22	6	

== All-Tournament team ==
=== First Team ===
- G: Rodney Schneck (Denver)
- D: Bill Steenson (North Dakota)
- D: Ed Zemrau (Denver)
- F: Murray Massier* (Denver)
- F: Bob Van Lammers (Clarkson)
- F: Jim Brown (Denver)

* Most Outstanding Player(s)

=== Second Team ===
- G: Eddie MacDonald (Clarkson)
- D: Blair Livingstone (Denver)
- D: Ralph Lyndon (North Dakota)
- F: Barry Sharp (Denver)
- F: Ron King (North Dakota)
- F: John MacMillan (Denver)
