= Ed Zemrau =

Canadian ice hockey player and executive

- Born: August 22, 1933 Edmonton, Alberta, Canada
- Died: April 23, 2012 (aged 78)
- Height: 5 ft 9 in (175 cm)
- Weight: 174 lb (79 kg; 12 st 6 lb)
- Position: Defenseman
- Shot: Left
- Played for: Denver; Winnipeg Warriors
- Playing career: 1955–1963

Edwin Zemrau was a Canadian ice hockey defenseman and executive who captained Denver to its first National Championship in 1958.

== Career ==
Zemrau came to the attention of Neil Celley while playing for the Lethbridge Native Sons and moved south to begin attending Denver University in the fall of 1954. Zemrau joined the varsity squad in 1955 and the Pioneers produced moderate results but towards the end of the year head coach Celley kicked four players off of the team for violating rules. Celley resigned shortly thereafter and Denver had to find a new leader for the ice hockey program. In 1956 former NHLer Murray Armstrong took over and stabilized the program, though the team's record didn't reflect any improvement.

For his senior season Zemrau was named team captain and with Armstrong's first recruiting class beginning play, everything seemed to align for the Pioneers. Denver jumped from 12 to 22 wins in the regular season, doubling their conference win total and going from 5th in the WIHL to 1st (tied), winning the program's first conference championship. The huge improvement earned Zemrau a spot on both the All-WIHL First Team and the AHCA All-American West Team

The championship earned Denver its first NCAA tournament bid as well and the team performed beautifully. In the semifinal the Pioneers dominated Clarkson 6–2 to advance to the championship game and face down co-WIHL champion North Dakota. The Fighting Sioux scored first, and held a one-goal lead at the end of the first but the defensive work done by Zemrau and others prevented North Dakota from building on their early lead. In the second period Denver's offense came alive for a 3-goal burst in under four minutes. Zemrau assisted on the third marker and then continued to hold back their opponents until the beginning of the third. UND cut the lead to one but Zemrau helped ensure that he assisted on the game-winner and The further goals from the Pioneers put the match out of reach, earning Denver the national championship.

After graduating, Zemrau continued his hockey career. He played for the Winnipeg Warriors, a minor-pro outfit that saw several members reach the NHL, in parts of three seasons as well as the Sault Thunderbirds. In 1960 he moved to Alberta and became the assistant dean of physical education at the University of Alberta. While working for the college he continued playing, appearing for the Lacombe Rockets for three years, before finally hanging up his skates when he was appointed as the first athletic director for the University. Zemrau was the AD at Alberta for 18 years and he became a figure in national athletics when he served as chairman of the Canadian University Centennial Project in 1967. He received the Canadian Centennial Medal for his contributions and served in several executive bodies over the next 20 years, becoming president of Canadian Intercollegiate Athletic Union (now called U Sports) in 1977.

After being named as the Edmonton Sportsman of the Year in 1984 Zemrau returned to Alberta and was a faculty professor from 1985 until his retirement. He remained active in national university sports in later life, serving as the first Vice President for the International Federation of University Sport from 1994 to 2003 and was on the board of directors for both the World Track and Field Championships and the World University Wrestling Championships. Zamrau was a member of the board of directors for the Calgary bid committee for the 1988 Winter Olympics.

== Personal ==
Ed Zemrau died from cancer at the age of 78. Shortly after Ed's death he was inducted into the Denver Athletic Hall of Fame.

== Statistics ==
=== Regular season and playoffs ===
			Regular season					Playoffs
Season	Team	League	GP	G	A	Pts	PIM	GP	G	A	Pts	PIM
1951–52	Lethbridge Native Sons	WCJHL	23	7	8	15	20	—	—	—	—	—
1952–53	Lethbridge Native Sons	WJHL	—	—	—	—	—	—	—	—	—	—
1953–54	Lethbridge Native Sons	WJHL	—	—	—	—	—	—	—	—	—	—
1955–56	Denver	WIHL	—	—	—	—	63	—	—	—	—	—
1956–57	Denver	WIHL	—	—	—	—	—	—	—	—	—	—
1957–58	Denver	WIHL	—	—	—	—	—	—	—	—	—	—
1957–58	Winnipeg Warriors	WHL	3	0	0	0	2	—	—	—	—	—
1958–59	Winnipeg Warriors	WHL	44	3	10	13	62	7	0	3	3	12
1959–60	Winnipeg Warriors	WHL	20	0	6	6	24	—	—	—	—	—
1959–60	Sault Thunderbirds	EPHL	50	1	11	12	77	—	—	—	—	—
1960–61	Lacombe Rockets	CAHL	—	—	—	—	—	—	—	—	—	—
1961–62	Lacombe Rockets	CAHL	—	—	—	—	—	—	—	—	—	—
1962–63	Lacombe Rockets	CAHL	—	—	—	—	—	—	—	—	—	—
NCAA totals			79	16	32	48	—	—	—	—	—	—

== Awards and honors ==
Award	Year
All-WIHL First Team	1957–58
AHCA West All-American	1957–58
NCAA All-Tournament First Team	1958
