= Don MacLeod (ice hockey) =

Canadian ice hockey player

Donald MacLeod
- Born: Charlottetown, Prince Edward Island, Canada
- Height: 5 ft 11 in (180 cm)
- Weight: 170 lb (77 kg; 12 st 2 lb)
- Position: Defenseman
- Played for: Boston University
- Playing career: 1955–1958

Donald MacLeod is a Canadian former ice hockey defenseman who was an All-American for Boston University in the United States.

== Career ==
MacLeod began attending Boston University in 1954. He joined the varsity ice hockey and baseball squads in his sophomore season and proceeded to win virtually every team award over the course of a three-year period. As a pitcher he had a 17–6 career record for the Terriers while he helped rebuild the ice hockey team into a powerhouse by 1958. He was named team MVP of both squads as a senior and was named as an AHCA East All-American the same year.

After graduating MacLeod pursued a professional baseball career, playing in the Milwaukee Braves's farm system for four years. In 1962 he became a teacher-coach for Acton-Boxborough High School in both ice hockey and baseball and served in that capacity for five years before becoming the assistant principal.

MacLeod was inducted into the Boston University Athletic Hall of Fame for both ice hockey and baseball.

== Statistics ==
=== Regular season and playoffs ===
| | | | Regular season | | | | | Playoffs |
| Season | Team | League | GP | G | A | Pts | PIM | GP | G | A | Pts | PIM |
|---|---|---|---|---|---|---|---|---|---|---|---|---|
| 1955–56 | Boston University | NCAA | — | — | — | — | — | — | — | — | — | — |
| 1956–57 | Boston University | NCAA | — | — | — | — | — | — | — | — | — | — |
| 1957–58 | Boston University | NCAA | 21 | — | — | — | — | — | — | — | — | — |
| NCAA totals | | | — | 23 | 40 | 63 | 46 | — | — | — | — | — |

== Awards and honors ==
| Award | Year |
|---|---|
| AHCA East All-American | 1957–58 |
