= Murray Massier =

Canadian ice hockey player

- Born: February 1937 (age 89) Regina, Saskatchewan, Canada
- Height: 5 ft 10 in (178 cm)
- Weight: 154 lb (70 kg; 11 st 0 lb)
- Position: Forward
- Played for: Denver; Denver Mavericks/Minneapolis Millers
- Playing career: 1957–1963

J. Murray Massier (born February 1937) is a Canadian retired ice hockey forward who was the Most Outstanding Player of the 1958 NCAA Tournament.

== Career ==
After winning consecutive Abbott Cups with the Regina Pats, Massier began attending Denver University in the fall of 1956. With NCAA rules limiting players to just three years of varsity play, Massier played with the school's freshman team before joined the varsity squad the following season. In 1957, Massier was one of several sophomores, all part of Murray Armstrong's tremendous first recruiting class, who helped the program go from 5th in the WIHL to 1st (tied). The first conference title for the team earned them their first NCAA tournament bid as well with Massier being a huge reason why.

In the tournament Denver swept aside Clarkson in the semifinal and advanced to face North Dakota for the championship. Just before the mid-way point of the game the Fighting Sioux held a 1–0 lead but Denver scored three times in quick succession, including two primary assists from Massier, to take the lead. After UND closed the gap in the third period Massier led another three-goal charge, contributing a goal and an assist, to put the game away. Massier's 4-point night earned him a spot on the All-Tournament First Team and was named the Most Outstanding Player.

That summer the WIHL was dissolved due to an ongoing argument between Denver and Minnesota over recruiting practices. As a result, the Pioneers had no limitations on their schedule and played as many home games as possible. This led to the team finishing with the best record among western schools, 22–5–1, but the NCAA selection committee was not impressed by Denver's ploy. North Dakota was chosen over Denver and when the Fighting Sioux won the championship that season there were many in Denver crying 'foul'. Despite still having a year of eligibility remaining, Massier left school after 1959 to pursue a professional career, becoming one of the earliest known cases of that circumstance. He joined the Denver Mavericks, an expansion team in the IHL, and despite finishing 3rd in team scoring he was gone after the inaugural season.

== Statistics ==
=== Regular season and playoffs ===
			Regular season					Playoffs
Season	Team	League	GP	G	A	Pts	PIM	GP	G	A	Pts	PIM
1954–55	Regina Pats	WCJHL	—	—	—	—	—	—	—	—	—	—
1955–56	Regina Pats	WCJHL	—	—	—	—	—	—	—	—	—	—
1957–58	Denver	WIHL	—	21	30	51	—	—	—	—	—	—
1958–59	Denver	NCAA	—	—	—	—	—	—	—	—	—	—
1959–60	Denver Mavericks/Minneapolis Millers	IHL	66	23	51	74	6	5	1	2	3	0
1962–63	Olds Elks	CAHL	—	—	—	—	—	—	—	—	—	—

== Awards and honors ==
Award	Year
All-WIHL Second Team	1957–58
NCAA All-Tournament First Team	1958

Awards and achievements
Preceded by Bob McCusker	NCAA Tournament Most Outstanding Player; 1958	Succeeded by Reg Morelli
