= Lord Copper =

Lord Copper may refer to:

- Lord Copper, character in Scoop (novel) by Evelyn Waugh
- Lord Cowper (died 1723), judge in Dudley v Dudley

== See also ==
- Lord Cooper (disambiguation)
- Copper (disambiguation)
