= Copper (disambiguation) =

Copper is a chemical element with symbol Cu and atomic number 29.

Copper or The Copper may also refer to:

== Color ==
- Copper (color), the color of the metal
- Copper (heraldry), when used as a metal tincture in heraldry

== Places ==
- Copper Mountain (disambiguation)
- Copper Lake (disambiguation)

=== United States ===
- Copper, Jackson County, Oregon, a submerged town
- Copper Salmon Wilderness, Oregon
- Copper Mine Gulch, California
- Copper Mountains, Arizona
- Copper Peak, Michigan
- Copper Country, an area in the Upper Peninsula of Michigan
- Copper River (Alaska), a 300-mile (480 km) river in south-central Alaska

=== Other ===
- Copper Coast or "Copper Triangle", an area of South Australia noted for its mining
- Copper Nunataks, Antarctic Peninsula

== People ==
- Copper (surname)
- Copper Kent (1891 – c. 1966), Australian rugby union player

== Arts and entertainment ==
- Copper (comic), a web and print comic by Kazu Kibuishi
- Copper (TV series), a BBC America period TV drama 2012–2013
- Rookie Blue (working title Copper), a Canadian police drama 2010–2015
- The Copper (1930 film), a British-German film directed by Richard Eichberg
- The Copper (1958 film), a West German film directed by Eugen York
- Copper (2025 film), a Canadian-Mexican film directed by Nicolás Pereda
- "Copper", a song by Shellac from Terraform
- Copper, a fictional dog in the 1967 novel The Fox and the Hound (novel) and its 1981 film adaptation, The Fox and the Hound

== Biology ==
- Copper-colored restrepia, a copper-colored orchid
- Copper shark (Carcharhinus brachyurus), also known as the bronze whaler or narrowtooth shark
- Copperhead may refer to any of three different species of snakes:
  - Agkistrodon contortrix, a venomous pit viper species found in parts of North America
  - Austrelaps, a genus of venomous elapids found in southern Australia and Tasmania
  - Elaphe radiata (copperhead rat snake), a nonvenomous species found in southern Asia
- The coppers, a nickname for the Lycaeninae, a family of butterflies
  - Copper ant-blue (Acrodipsas cuprea), found in Australia, from southern Queensland to Victoria
  - Copper pencil-blue (Candalides cyprotus), found along the east coast of Australia, including South Australia, New South Wales, Western Australia and Victoria
- The copper underwing (Amphipyra pyramidea), a moth of the family Noctuidae, distributed across the Palaearctic region

== Elements, materials, and technology ==
- Copper, a coin of low value, brown- or copper-colored
- Copper, a shaped ingot or ornamental sheet of the metal used by indigenous tribes of the North American West Coast region in potlatch ceremonies, as a show of wealth (ingot) and as a symbolic representation of a slave (sheet)
- Copper, telecommunications jargon for twisted pair connections
- Copper, the Manhattan Project's codename for plutonium
- Copper, short for "co-processor", part of the original Amiga chipset
- Copper, a brew kettle for making beer
- Native copper, a naturally occurring mineral consisting of pure copper
- Wash copper or just copper, a large cauldron used for heating water and laundry

== Other uses ==
- Copper ale, a style of beer
- Copper Riot (1662), a major riot which took place in Moscow
- Copper Project, a cloud-based project management software tool
- COPPeR (short for Cultural Office of the Pikes Peak Region), an arts organization in Colorado Springs, Colorado
- Copper Age, a phase in human technological development
- "Copper", British or Australian slang for a police officer, hence the North American 'cop'
- The Copper (building), an apartment building in Manhattan
- Copper Line (San Diego Trolley), a light rail line in San Diego, California

== See also ==
- Capper (disambiguation)
- Cooper (disambiguation)
- Coppa (disambiguation)
- Coppers (disambiguation)
- Koppa (disambiguation)
- Isotopes of copper
