= Capper =

Capper is a surname. Notable people with the surname include:

- Andy Capper (born 1973), English journalist
- Arthur Capper (1865–1951), American politician
- Charles Capper, American historian
- Charles Capper (politician) (1822–1869), British Member of Parliament
- Edmund Capper (1906–1998), English bishop
- Freddy Capper (1891–1955), English footballer
- Gavin Capper, fictional character on the soap opera Shortland Street
- Henry Capper (19th century), editor of London newspapers devoted to South Australia
- Jack Capper (1931–2009), Welsh footballer
- James Capper (1743–1855), British officer of the East India Company
- James Capper (sculptor) British kinetic sculptor
- John Capper (1861–1955), senior British Army officer
- John Capper (editor) (1814–1898), English author and Orientalist
- Louisa Capper, children's writer
- Stewart Henbest Capper (1859–1925), Scottish architect
- Suzanne Capper (1976–1992), English murder victim
- Thompson Capper (1863–1915), senior British Army officer
- Warwick Capper (born 1963), Australian rules footballer
- Wilfrid Merydith Capper (1905–1998), countryside campaigner in Northern Ireland
- William Capper (1856–1934), senior British Army officer

== Fictional characters ==
- Capper, a character in My Little Pony: The Movie (2017 film)

== See also ==
- Capper Pass and Son, British smelting and refining company
- Capper–Volstead Act, American legislation
- Murder of Suzanne Capper
