= Copper Mountain =

Copper Mountain may refer to:

== Places in Canada ==
- Copper Mountain (Alberta)
- Copper Mountain (British Columbia)
- Copper Mountain, British Columbia, Canada

== Places in the United States ==
- Copper Mountains, a mountain in Arizona
- Copper Mountain (Colorado), a mountain and ski resort
- Copper Mountain, Colorado, United States, a census-designated place
- Peak Mountain or Copper Mountain, a mountain in Connecticut
- Copper Mountain (Idaho), a peak of the Sawtooth Range in Idaho
- Copper Mountain (Montana), a mountain in Madison County, Montana
- Copper Mountain (Nevada)
- Copper Mountain (South Dakota), a mountain in South Dakota
- Copper Mountain (Mason County, Washington), a summit in Olympic National Park
- Copper Mountain (Pierce County, Washington), a summit in Mount Rainier National Park
- Copper Mountain (Whatcom County, Washington), a summit in North Cascades National Park
- Copper Mountain (Wyoming), A summit in the Bridger Mountains in central Wyoming.

== Other uses ==
- Copper Mountain (film), a 1983 film
- Copper Mountain Solar Facility, a facility in Boulder City, Nevada
