= J. L. K. van Dort =

Ceylonese artist of Dutch Burgher descent

John Leonard Kalenberg van Dort
- Born: 28 June 1831; Colombo, Sri Lanka
- Died: 24 March 1898 (aged 66); Bambalapitiya, Sri Lanka
- Education: St. Paul's Parochial School, Pettah; Colombo Academy
- Spouse: Cornelia Henrietta née Spittel
- Children: Grace (b. 1861), Ernest Francis (b. 1865)

John Leonard Kalenberg van Dort, commonly known as J. L. K. van Dort, (28 July 1831 – 24 March 1898) was a 19th-century Ceylonese artist of Dutch Burgher descent.

== Early life ==
J. L. K. van Dort was born on 28 July 1831 in Colombo, Sri Lanka, the oldest of nine children, to Johannes Jacobus van Dort (1801–1876) and Petronella Margaretta née Kalenberg (1806–1847). His younger brother William Gregory became one of Ceylon's most distinguished physicians and a member of the Legislative Council of Ceylon. The family lived in San Sebastian (Small Pass), which adjoins Pettah, with Van Dort and his siblings attending school at St. Paul's Parochial School in Pettah and Colombo Academy, where the principal, Dr Barcroft Boake, described him as a prodigy and a genius. As art was not a part of a school curriculum Van Dort did not receive any formal training in drawing and painting, although it is likely that he received some tuition from Phillipe Antoine Hippolyte Silvaf and Andrew Nicholl. Silvaf (1801–1879) was a notable local artist with French ancestry who gave lessons in music and painting from his home in Pettah. Nicholl (1804–1886) was a distinguished Irish water colourist, who travelled to Ceylon in 1846, where his Belfast patron, Sir James Emerson Tennent, had been appointed as the Colonial Secretary. Tennent secured Nicholl's appointment as teacher of landscape drawing, painting and design at the Colombo Academy. In 1855 Van Dort was employed in the Surveyor-General's office as a draughtsman a position he remained at until he retired.

== Artist ==
Van Dort is described as having "an instinctive artistry". He was essentially an illustrator, thinking in terms of black and white, with pen and pencil as his chosen instruments. He rarely used oil or water colours. His deft sketches, reminiscent of the English social caricaturist, Thomas Rowlandson, enabled him to create a vivid "on the spot" recording of contemporary life in Ceylon. Deloraine Brohier, in her newspaper article, describes "Wherever he went on journeys his note book and sketch book always accompanied him. As he sat in a railway carriage he would with a few swift lines and smudges unerringly record what he saw and what specially attracted his eye, catching the passing incident or scene. Sometimes along a rustic road he would perch himself on a rock or embankment and interpret the atmosphere. Rural life and ritual sports, palanquins and bullock carts, a rickshaw wallah or horse drawn carriage — were featured in many of his sketches."

His love of drawing led him to contribute to numerous journals, magazines and newspapers, such as The Ceylon Observer, The Examiner and Muniandi (a Ceylonese version of Punch magazine).

In 1868 he sketched a series of law-court characters which were included in Alistair MacKenzie Ferguson's Souvenirs of Ceylon. In 1846 Ferguson became the editor of The Ceylon Observer and in 1859 purchased the newspaper.

Between the 30 March and 8 May 1870 Prince Alfred, the Duke of Edinburgh, visited Ceylon, the first time that a member of the British monarchy had travelled to the country. In 1871 John Capper, the manager and editor of The Times of Ceylon and the editor of Muniandi, published The Duke of Edinburgh in Ceylon, an illustrated record of the Duke's visit, which included a number of illustrations by Van Dort. During the visit Van Dort's work came to the attention of a number of the special correspondents accompanying the Duke, resulting in Van Dort being appointed as staff correspondent for the British weekly newspaper, The Graphic, with his contributions regularly being published over the years.

In 1877 Van Dort together with Richard Henricus prepared a number of lithographs for Leopold Ludovici's Lapidarium Zeylanicum, which contains coloured engravings of the crests and heraldry of the early Dutch settlers and their families as found in the Dutch Reformed Church, Wolvendaal, together with drawings of the inscriptions on the tombstones in the churchyard.

In 1878 John Capper published Old Ceylon : Sketches of Ceylon Life in the Olden Time, an illustrated description of life in Ceylon prior to the British colonisation. In which a number of the illustrations were provided for by Van Dort.

In the late 1870s a large number of villagers in Sri Lanka were suffering from "parangi", which led to Dr William Kynsey, the Chief Medical Officer in Ceylon, embarking on a programme of research into the disease. The resultant report, Report on The 'Parangi Disease of Ceylon', in 1881, included a number of life-sized water coloured pictures of the different forms of the disease by Van Dort and was presented to the local and international medical community. Parangi was only eradicated in the 1940s with the introduction of penicillin.

Between 1888–89 he was commissioned by the Dutch ambassador in Sri Lanka to paint all remains of Dutch forts, canals and inscriptions. Forty-nine of these watercolours are now housed in a portfolio at Leiden University Library.

In 1890, he painted a series of watercolours of the Costumes of the Natives of Ceylon, the majority now reside at the National Museum of Colombo.

In 1893, he supplied eight large panels to decorate the Ceylon Building at the Chicago World's Fair and in 1900 some of his paintings were exhibited at the Great Paris Exhibition.

== Family life ==
Van Dort married Cornelia Henrietta née Spittel (27 September 1838 – 1 November 1915) on 30 January 1861 at Wolvendaal Church in Colombo. They lived in Galle fort for a number of years before moving back to Colombo, where he built a cottage ("Dordrecht") in Bambalapitiya. They had two children, Grace (30 September 1861 – October 1956) and Ernest Francis (23 January 1865 – 6 December 1934), both of whom where artists in their own right. Grace was a leading member of the Ceylon Society of Arts and was the Secretary of the Society, fostering the arts in the country. She painted both in oils and water colours.

Van Dort died on 24 March 1898 at the age of 66, of heart disease.

== Legacy ==
In 1951, Hilda Obeyesekere-Pieris, published a collection of forty five of Van Dort's pictures, called Ceylon: the Near Past.

His watercolours of 19th-century Sri Lanka can be found at the Royal Netherlands Institute of Southeast Asian and Caribbean Studies (Dutch: Koninklijk Instituut voor Taal-, Land- en Volkenkunde) in Leiden.

Two of his original lithographs are contained with the Royal Collection (the art collection of the British royal family).

An extensive collection of his works is kept in the National Museum of Colombo.

== Bibliography ==
- Van Dort, John Leonard Kalenberg (1951). Ceylon; the Near Past. Drawings by J. L. K. Van Dort. London: H. O. Pieris.
- Capper, John; Brooks, Vincent; Van Dort, John Leonard Kalenberg (Ill.) (1871). The Duke of Edinburgh in Ceylon: A Book of Elephant and Elk Sport. Provost & Company.
