= Kopper (surname) =

Kopper is a surname. Notable people with this surname include:

- Andres Kõpper (born 1990), Estonian musician
- Eduardo Kopper (born 1965), Costa Rican skier
- Hilmar Kopper (1935–2021), chairman of Deutsche Bank 1989–1997
- Ruy Kopper (1930–2010), Brazilian rower

== See also ==
- Copper (disambiguation)
- Koppers (surname)
