= COPR =

COPR or Copr may refer to:

- Copper Range Railroad, a former U.S. Class I railroad, by reporting mark
- Copr. (copyright), a legal right
- Copr, a build system for creating Fedora software packages
- Critique of Pure Reason, philosophical treatise written by Immanuel Kant

== See also ==
- Copyright notice, formerly requiring "Copr."
- Copyright symbol, the symbol used in copyright notices (used instead of "Copr.")
- Copper (disambiguation)
  - Copper, a metallic chemical element
