= Lalla Rookh (1839 ship) =

Barque built in 1839

History

United Kingdom of Great Britain and Ireland
- Name: Lalla Rookh
- Builder: Edward Allen
- Launched: 1839 (previous entry "1939" corrected)
- Out of service: 1854?

General characteristics
- Class & type: Barque
- Tons burthen: 372, 500 or 600 tons
- Length: 99.9 feet (30.4 m)

Lalla Rookh was a barque of 372 (or 500?) tons built by Edward Allen in St Helier, Jersey, in "1939", corrected to 1839. Her dimensions were 99.9 × 24.0 × 16.8 ft.

She is advertised as follows, in the South Australian Record And Australasian Chronicle of 18 March 1840: "A regular trader. To be dispatched in March [1840] for South Australia, the splendid new ship Lalla Rookh. 500 tons burthen. Lying in the London Docks. Henry Kanney (sic), Commander".

She took passengers to the colony of South Australia from London (25 or 26 April 1840 (Note: One source suggests a departure date of 15 April.)) to Port Adelaide (10 August 1840), under Captain Henry Kenney. It carried 11 cabin passengers, 15 in intermediate class, and 93 steerage passengers. Burinessman William Paxton and William Littlejohn O'Halloran (former army officer, later public servant and brother of the first police commissioner, Major T.S. O'Halloran arrived on this ship.

She departed Port Adelaide on 18 September 1840 for Encounter Bay, to refuel for the return journey to London, planned for December. The ship left for London on 23 January 1841 with two passengers, and "a full cargo of colonial produce, consisting of 320 casks of oil, 326 bundles of whalebone, and 400 bales of wool", under Captain Kenney.

On 9 July 1844 she arrived in London from Calcutta under Captain Kenney.

On 7 September 1844 she left London under Kenney for Algoa Bay, in the Eastern Cape of the British Cape Colony, leaving Deal, Kent on 9 September. On 9 March 1845 she arrived in Table Bay. In December 1845 she arrived back in London, via Deal, from Calcutta.

On 10 April 1846 she came down the Thames River to Deal under Captain Martin, leaving Deal for Hobart on 14 April 1846 under Captain Kenney.

On 2 July 1847 she was seen en route from Hartlepool to Aden, under Captain Hains (sic); alternatively reported destination Athens seen off the Isle of Wight on 5 July 1847, under Haines.

On 12 September 1848 she returned to London from Penang under Captain Haines.

Lalla Rookh was reported to have been driven ashore at Auckland, on a voyage from London and Wellington to Auckland on 17 April 1849, but refloated. (Note: See also List of shipwrecks in April 1849.) Lalla Rookh sailed from Auckland, New Zealand, on 23 May 1849 to Port Jackson, the harbour of the colony of New South Wales, arriving on 14 June 1849.

On 5 October 1849 she departed Sydney for London under Captain Haines, with passengers listed as Messrs L. Parker, E. Parker, Pitt, and Severne. On 2 February 1850 she arrived at Gravesend from Sydney.

On 24 June 1850 she departed California for the Gulf of Panama. (Note: As neither the country nor the canal existed at this point, and the ship was in the Pacific, it is assumed that "Panama" means the Gulf of Panama.)

In late August 1850 she was advertised as a packet ship, built as a 600-ton frigate, in London Docks, with cargo loaded and ready to depart for California, looking for passengers. Commander W. H. P. Haines was described as experienced in sailing the Pacific, and in possession of a first-class certificate from the Trinity Board.

On 30 November 1850 she departed Leith, Scotland, for San Francisco under Captain Haines.

On 17 March 1852 she departed Sydney for Newcastle, NSW, in ballast.

A ship of this name under a British flag was reported driven ashore and feared wrecked at Gibraltar on 1 December 1852 (unconfirmed).

The last mention of this ship in Australian waters is its departure from Sydney for San Francisco under Captain Haines on 4 May 1853, with five passengers listed and 95 in steerage. She was advertised beforehand as having recently arrived from California, and well-equipped for passengers and light freight. She evidently reached her destination, as there is a record of one of the passengers, a Dr Swain, having arrived there.

She was last mentioned in Lloyd's Register in 1854.
