= Coppers =

Coppers may refer to:

- Butterflies from the subfamily Lycaeninae
- Police officers
- Coppers (film), a 2019 Canadian documentary film
- Coppers (Belgian TV series) or Rough Justice, a 2015 Belgian crime TV series
- Coppers (British TV series), a 2010 and 2012 British documentary series about policing in the United Kingdom
- Rome Coppers, a 2007 American baseball team of the New York State League
- Copper Face Jacks, nightclub in Dublin, Ireland
- Vermont copper, an 18th-century copper coin minted by the Vermont Republic until admission to the United States
- Coins of the pound sterling, collectively 1p and 2p decimal coins, due to their copper plating

== See also ==
- Copper (disambiguation)
- Koppers (surname)
- Koppers
