= Ceylon Daily Mirror =

- Type: Daily newspaper
- Format: Tabloid
- Owner: Times of Ceylon Limited
- Founded: 1961
- Ceased publication: 1979
- Language: English
- City: Colombo
- Country: Ceylon
- Sister newspapers: Lankadeepa; Morning Times; Sri Lankadeepa; Sunday Mirror; Sunday Times of Ceylon; The Times of Ceylon; Vanitha Viththi
- OCLC number: 220071729

The Ceylon Daily Mirror was an English language daily newspaper in Ceylon published by Times of Ceylon Limited (TOCL). Modelled on the British Daily Mirror, it was founded in 1961 and was published from Colombo. In 1966 it had an average net sales of 17,705. It had an average circulation of 17,217 in 1970, 15,995 in 1973 and 8,500 in 1976. It was renamed Daily Mirror in the mid-1970s. It ceased publication in 1979.

TOCL was nationalised by the Sri Lankan government in August 1977. The state-run TOCL faced financial and labour problems and on 31 January 1985 it and its various publications closed down. Ranjith Wijewardena, chairman of Associated Newspapers of Ceylon Limited (ANCL) before it was nationalised in July 1973, bought the trade names and library of the TOCL publications in 1986. Wijewardena's company, Wijeya Newspapers, subsequently started various newspapers using the names of former TOCL publications. The Midweek Mirror, later renamed The Daily Mirror, started publishing in 1995.
