= Sunday Times of Ceylon =

Sri Lankan English language newspaper

- Type: Weekly newspaper
- Owner: Times of Ceylon Limited
- Founded: 1923
- Language: English
- City: Colombo
- Country: Ceylon
- Sister newspapers: Ceylon Daily Mirror; Lankadeepa; Morning Times; Sri Lankadeepa; Sunday Mirror; The Times of Ceylon; Vanitha Viththi
- OCLC number: 36651712

The Sunday Times of Ceylon was an English language weekly newspaper in Ceylon published by Times of Ceylon Limited (TOCL). It was founded in 1923 and was published from Colombo. In 1966 it had an average net sales of 34,856. It was published under different names during its existence, including Times of Ceylon Sunday Illustrated, Times Weekender and Sunday Times. It had an average circulation of 29,613 in 1970, 29,054 in 1973 and 18,500 in 1976.

TOCL was nationalised by the Sri Lankan government in August 1977. The state-run TOCL faced financial and labour problems and on 31 January 1985 it and its various publications closed down. Ranjith Wijewardena, chairman of Associated Newspapers of Ceylon Limited (ANCL) before it was nationalised in July 1973, bought the trade names and library of the TOCL publications in 1986. Wijewardena's company, Wijeya Newspapers, subsequently started various newspapers using the names of former TOCL publications. The Sunday Times started publishing in 1987.
