= Copper Lake =

Copper Lake may refer to:

- Copper Lake (Nova Scotia, Canada)
- Copper Lake (Whatcom County, Washington)
