= Lankadeepa (Ceylon) =

Sri Lankan Sinhala language newspaper

- Type: Daily newspaper
- Owner: Times of Ceylon Limited
- Founded: 29 October 1947
- Language: Sinhala
- City: Colombo
- Country: Ceylon
- Sister newspapers: Ceylon Daily Mirror; Morning Times; Sri Lankadeepa; Sunday Mirror; Sunday Times of Ceylon; The Times of Ceylon; Vanitha Viththi

Lankadeepa was a Sinhala language daily newspaper in Ceylon published by Times of Ceylon Limited (TOCL). It was founded on 29 October 1947 and was published from Colombo. Initially an evening paper, it became a morning daily on 1 May 1949. In 1966 it had an average net sales of 56,241. It had an average circulation of 57,769 in 1970, 33,751 in 1973 and 14,000 in 1976.

TOCL was nationalised by the Sri Lankan government in August 1977. The state-run TOCL faced financial and labour problems and on 31 January 1985 it and its various publications closed down. Ranjith Wijewardena, chairman of Associated Newspapers of Ceylon Limited (ANCL) before it was nationalised in July 1973, bought the trade names and library of the TOCL publications in 1986. Wijewardena's company, Wijeya Newspapers, subsequently started various newspapers using the names of former TOCL publications. Lankadeepa started publishing in 1991.
