= Sunday Mirror (Ceylon) =

English language weekly newspaper in Ceylon 1966–1985

- Type: Weekly newspaper
- Owner: Times of Ceylon Limited
- Founded: 1966
- Language: English
- City: Colombo
- Country: Ceylon
- Sister newspapers: Ceylon Daily Mirror; Lankadeepa; Morning Times; Sri Lankadeepa; Sunday Times of Ceylon; The Times of Ceylon; Vanitha Viththi

The Sunday Mirror was an English language weekly newspaper in Ceylon published by Times of Ceylon Limited (TOCL). It was founded in 1966 and was published from Colombo. In 1966 it had an average net sales of 20,629.

TOCL was nationalised by the Sri Lankan government in August 1977. The state-run TOCL faced financial and labour problems and on 31 January 1985 it and its various publications closed down.
