= Otter Creek Brewing =

- Type: Private
- Industry: Alcoholic beverage
- Founded: 1991
- Headquarters: Middlebury, Vermont; United States
- Products: Beer

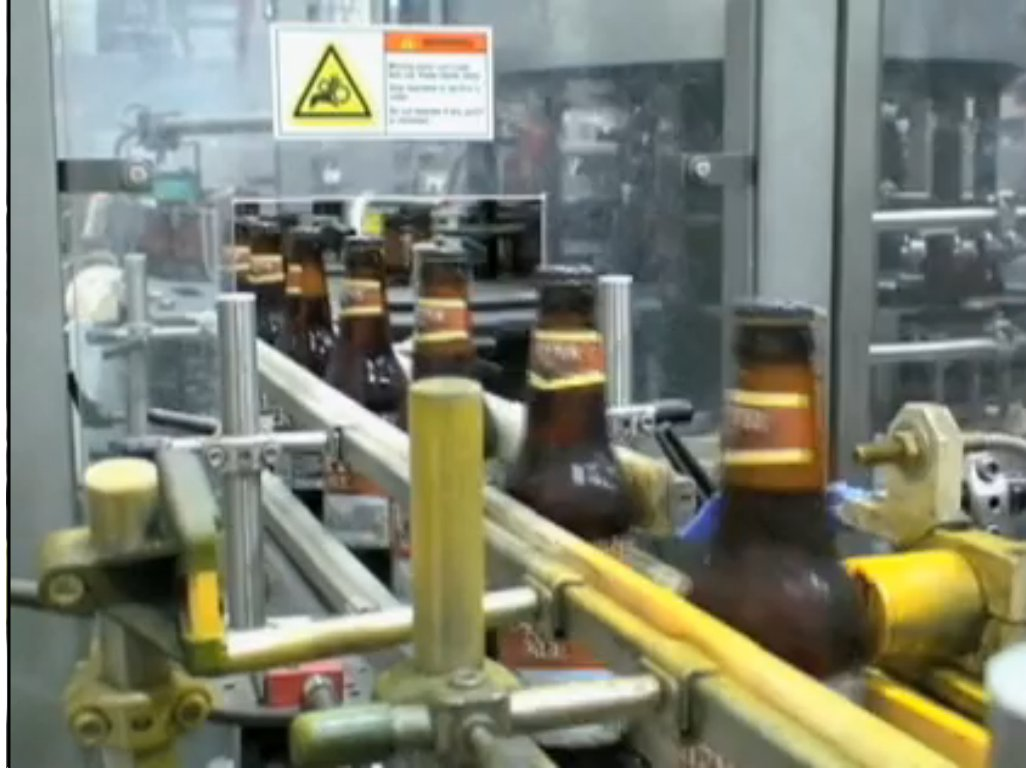
The Otter Creek bottling line in action

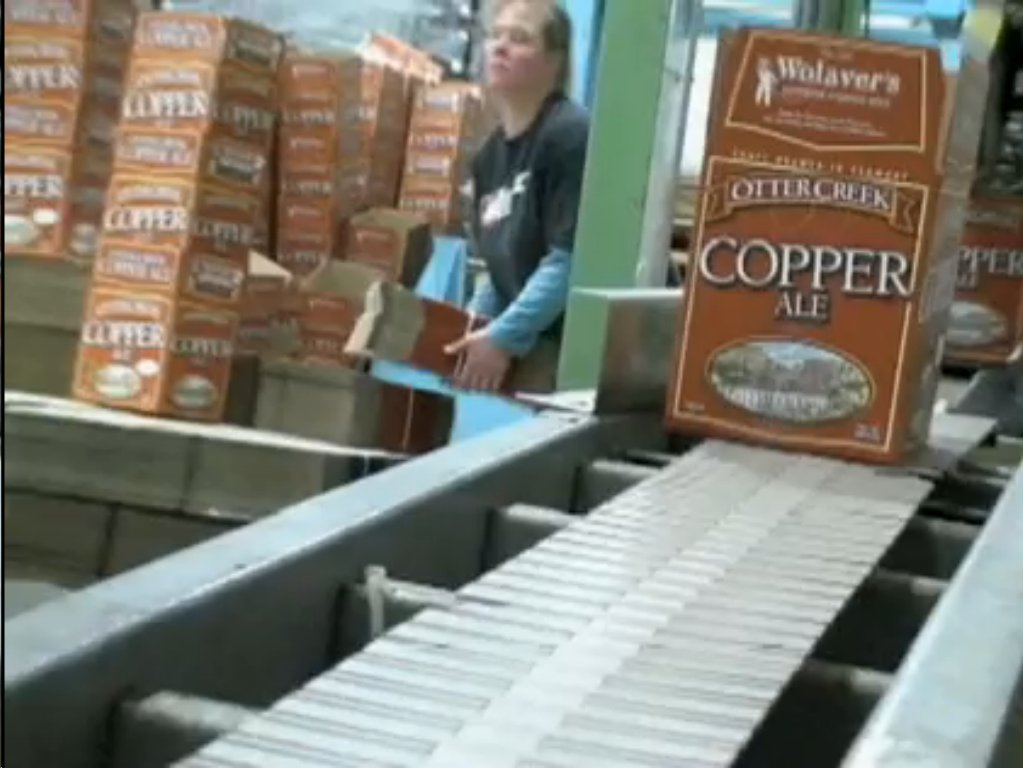
Finished bottles of copper ale

Otter Creek Brewing is a brewery in Middlebury, Vermont, that produces two lines of beer: Otter Creek Craft Ales, and Shed Brewery Ales. It brewed Wolaver's Organic Brewery beers from 2002 until 2015, when it ceased brewing that line.

== Otter Creek ==
In March 1991, Otter Creek brewed its first Copper Ale at 616 Exchange Street in Middlebury and shipped its first keg of beer shortly thereafter. Four years later, the brewery expanded and moved down the road to 793 Exchange Street where they expanded production to 60,000-barrels. Otter Creek Brewing distributes its year-round and seasonal beers to fifteen states in the mid-Atlantic and Northeast regions.

Otter Creek brews and bottles all of its beers in small batches and uses natural Vermont water; domestic malts and hops; and its own top-fermenting yeast. In 2005, Otter Creek Brewing produced approximately 30,000 barrels of beer and distributed in 22 States.

Otter Creek brews three year-round beers:

- Free Flow, a 6% American IPA
- Berner, a 7% American IPA
- Ella, a 5.5% India Pale Lager

This current line-up follows a major production overhaul that saw Otter Creek do away with all of their original flagship beers, including their Copper Ale, Stovepipe Porter, and Black IPA. Otter Creek also produces a number of seasonal and occasional beers, almost all of which are also of a hop-forward nature.

In 2010, Massachusetts private equity firm Fulham and Co. acquired Otter Creek Brewing through their Long Trail Brewing Company subsidiary.

== Wolaver's Organic ==
In 1997, Wolaver's (based in Nevada City, California) became the first USDA-certified organic brewer. The Wolaver's line only contains organic beers. The company started in Santa Cruz, California but was brewing their ales in several locations including the Mendocino Brewing Company in Ukiah, California, Goose Island Brewery in Chicago, Illinois and Otter Creek in Vermont.

About two years later, Wolaver's moved to Nevada City, California and began looking to buy a brewery in 2001. Wolaver's purchased Otter Creek in 2002 to consolidate production. The brewers worked with the organic barley and farmers in the area to create a market for organic hops. All the Wolaver's styles are certified organic by Vermont Organic Farmers, and featured wheat and oats grown locally in Addison County, Vermont. Since 2002, all Wolaver's Organic were brewed in Middlebury, Vermont.

Wolaver's brewed three year-round beers and several seasonals. Their year-round beers were:

- Brown Ale
- IPA
- Oatmeal Stout

Long Trail ceased brewing Wolaver's in December 2015.

== Shed Brewery line ==
Otter Creek/Wolaver's acquired the Shed Brewery in 2011 when the former owners decided to close and continues to brew Shed Mountain Ale and Shed IPA. Shed Brewery brews include:

- Mountain Ale
- The Shed IPA
- Profanity Ale
- Nosedive Vanilla Porter

== See also ==
- Beer in the United States
