= Eva Ranaweera =

Sri Lankan feminist writer and journalist

- ඊවා රණවීර
- Born: 1924
- Died: 9 February 2010 (aged 85–86)
- Resting place: Borella cemetery
- Citizenship: Sri Lanka
- Education: University of Colombo
- Occupations: Novelist; poet; journalist
- Writing career
- Language: English; Sinhala
- Notable work: Sedona
- Notable awards: State Literary Award (1993, 1998)

Eva Ranaweera (Sinhala: ඊවා රණවීර; 1924 – 9 February 2010) was a feminist writer, poet and journalist who wrote in both English and Sinhala. She was the first editor of the magazine Vanitha Viththi.

== Biography ==
Ranaweera was born to a privileged Sri Lankan family and grew up speaking only English. Her family had worked for the British colonial administration in what was then Ceylon. She attended Holy Cross College, Gampaha. She studied English, History and Sinhala at the University of Colombo from 1949 to 1953. She later wrote in both English and Sinhala, and published books and articles in both languages.

After university she joined the Sinhala-language newspaper Lankadeepa, despite the fact she was just beginning to learn the language. Her first assignments were to translate articles from English to Sinhala. After four years at the newspaper, she resigned and began work at the University of Colombo as a translator. However she resigned shortly afterwards and began to travel around the world, visiting Switzerland, Russia, China, India and Vietnam, as well as working in Egypt. She returned to Sr Lanka and became the first editor of the popular women's magazine Vanitha Viththi. A feminist, Ranaweera used her writing and her activism to broaden the horizons of women, particularly those in rural areas. She published five volumes of poetry in English, which included her first publication.

Ranaweera died on 9 February 2010. At the time of her death she was editing the journal Voices of Women, which was published by the feminist organisation Kantha Handa. Her funeral took place on 11 February 2010 at Kanatte Cemetery in Borella.

== Reception ==
Described as "a bilingual writer par excellence", Ranaweera was also praised for her depictions of rural working class voices in the novels Laisa and Sedona. She is recognised for her use of stream-of-consciousness in both novels. This has led to comparisons with James Joyce and Siri Gunasinghe. According to S.B. Anuruddhika Kumari Kularathna, her novels can be "located in the context of Subaltern Studies, Post colonialism and Feminism". Her poetry was described by L W Conolly as both "strong and emotive" and "occasionally humdrum". Her novel Sedona was adapted into an award-winning television in Sri Lanka.

Ranaweera was noted as one of a small number of Anglophone writers, who chose to stay in Sri Lanka after its civil war, rather than flee to the West.

== Awards ==
=== State Literary Award ===
- 1998 - With Maya
- 1993 - When we returned without you

=== Gratiaen Prize ===
- 2000 (shortlisted) - Blissfully.
- 1996 (shortlisted) – With Maya.
- 1994 (shortlisted) – What Will you Do Do Do Clara, What Will you do?

== Selected publications ==
=== In Sinhalese ===
==== Novels ====
- Laisa (1967)
- Sedona (1973)

==== Drama ====
- Attakamal Paravagiya (1993)
- Pin Gona
- Lovi Gahe Pilila
- Ehata Vahala Nil Ahasai
- Samanala Uyana
- Maha Andakaraya

==== Short stories ====
- Mora Kele
- Atara Maga

=== In English ===
==== Poetry ====
- What will you do do do Clara what will you do? (1994)
- When we returned without you
- With Maya (1997)
- Blissfully
- Ending with beginning (2001)

==== Non-fiction ====
- Some Literary Women of Sri Lanka (1991)
