= Sri Lankadeepa =

Sri Lankan Sinhala language newspaper

- Type: Weekly newspaper
- Owner: Times of Ceylon Limited
- Founded: 1951
- Language: Sinhala
- City: Colombo
- Country: Ceylon
- Sister newspapers: Ceylon Daily Mirror; Lankadeepa; Morning Times; Sunday Mirror; Sunday Times of Ceylon; The Times of Ceylon; Vanitha Viththi

Sri Lankadeepa was a Sinhala language weekly newspaper in Ceylon published by Times of Ceylon Limited (TOCL). It was founded in 1951 and was published from Colombo. In 1966 it had an average net sales of 118,561. It had an average circulation of 133,093 in 1970, 85,654 in 1973 and 55,000 in 1976.

TOCL was nationalised by the Sri Lankan government in August 1977. The state-run TOCL faced financial and labour problems and on 31 January 1985 it and its various publications closed down. Ranjith Wijewardena, chairman of Associated Newspapers of Ceylon Limited (ANCL) before it was nationalised in July 1973, bought the trade names and library of the TOCL publications in 1986. Wijewardena's company, Wijeya Newspapers, subsequently started various newspapers using the names of former TOCL publications. Irida Lankadeepa started publishing in 1986.
