= Christine Spittel-Wilson =

British writer (1912–2010)

Christine Spittel-Wilson (1912 – 26 February 2010) was a British writer and artist.

The daughter of Dr. Richard Lionel Spittel and Claribel Frances Van Dort, she was born Christine Spittel and grew up in Colombo, Sri Lanka. She was educated at Roedean School in East Sussex. Besides her books, she published a number of articles on topics such as travel, wildlife conservation and social anthropology. In 1944, she married Major Alistair McNeil-Wilson; he died in 2007. In 2009, she gave an exhibition of her paintings and ceramic art. Spittel-Wilson was a fellow of the Royal Geographical Society. She died in Colombo at the age of 97.

== Selected works ==
- The Bitter Berry (1957) novel
- The Mountain Road novel
- I Am The Wings (1961) novel
- Surgeon of the Wilderness (1975) biography of her father
- Secrets of Eastern Cooking cookbook
- Christine (2007) autobiography
