= List of shipwrecks in April 1849 =

The list of shipwrecks in April 1849 includes ships sunk, foundered, wrecked, grounded, or otherwise lost during April 1849.

== 1 April ==
List of shipwrecks: 1 April 1849
Ship	State	Description
Emigrant	United States	The barque foundered off the North Rock, New Zealand with the loss of all hands.
Petrel	(United Kingdom of Great Britain and Ireland) New Zealand	The schooner was inundated with water and sank during a heavy storm off Waikanae Beach, with the loss of both crew.

== 2 April ==
List of shipwrecks: 2 April 1849
Ship	State	Description
Andromeda	United Kingdom	The ship was driven ashore at Odesa. She was refloated on 13 April.
Hannah	United Kingdom	The ship was driven ashore at Shoreham-by-Sea, Sussex. She was refloated the next day and taken in to Shoreham-by-Sea.
Laura	United Kingdom	The ship was wrecked south of Mobile, Alabama, United States. Her crew were rescued. She was on a voyage from Liverpool, Lancashire to Mobile.

== 3 April ==
List of shipwrecks: 3 April 1849
Ship	State	Description
Andromeda	United Kingdom	The ship was driven ashore at Odesa. She was refloated on 13 April.
Insignia	United Kingdom	The ship was destroyed by fire. Her crew were rescued by Von Spac (Netherlands). Insignia was on a voyage from New Orleans, Louisiana to Liverpool, Lancashire.
Magnificent	United Kingdom	The ship was abandoned in the Atlantic Ocean. Her crew were rescued by J. C. J. van Speyk (Netherlands). Magnificent was on a voyage from New Orleans, Louisiana to Liverpool, Lancashire.
Margiena Margaretha	Netherlands	The smack was abandoned in the North Sea. Her crew were rescued by Martin Luther (Norway).
New York	United States	The ship ran aground on Robbin's Reef. She was on a voyage from Havre de Grâce, Seine-Inférieure, France. She was refloated the next day and completed her voyage.
Supply	(United Kingdom of Great Britain and Ireland) Isle of Man	The smack was wrecked on the Carter Rock, off Port St. Mary.
William Griffith	United Kingdom	The ship was abandoned in the North Sea. Her crew were rescued by Reinhard (flag unknown). William Griffith was on a voyage from Charlestown, Cornwall to Travemünde.

== 4 April ==
List of shipwrecks: 4 April 1849
Ship	State	Description
Example	United States	The schooner was abandoned in the Atlantic Ocean. Her crew were rescued by Elizabeth Whitney (United States). Example was on a voyage from Staten Island, New York to a port in Virginia.
Fanny	United Kingdom	The brigantine sprang a leak and sank 5 nautical miles (9.3 km) east of the Copeland Islands, County Down. Her crew were rescued. She was on a voyage from Ayr to Runcorn, Cheshire.
Olive	United Kingdom	The schooner was wrecked at Stonehaven, Aberdeenshire with the loss of two of the seventeen people on board and two rescuers. She was on a voyage from Hull, Yorkshire to Stonehaven.
Shannon	United Kingdom	The ship sprang a leak off Caldy Island, Pembrokeshire. She was beached in Sandy Haven Bay. She was on a voyage from Llanelly, Glamorgan to Wicklow.

== 5 April ==
List of shipwrecks: 5 April 1849
Ship	State	Description
Robert Lawe	United Kingdom	The ship struck a sunken wreck off the north coast of Norfolk. She put in to King's Lynn in a leaky condition.
Shannon	United Kingdom	The ship sprang a leak and was beached in Sandy Haven Bay. She was on a voyage from Llanelly, Glamorgan to Wicklow.

== 6 April ==
List of shipwrecks: 6 April 1849
Ship	State	Description
HDMS Christian VIII	Royal Danish Navy	First Schleswig War, Battle of Eckernförde: The second rate ship of the line was damaged by Prussian artillery and was beached at Eckernförde. She was subsequently refloated but grounded again, caught fire and exploded with the loss of 100 of her 800 crew.
HDMS Gefion	Royal Danish Navy	First Schleswig War, Battle of Eckernförde: The fifth rate frigate was severely damaged by Prussian artillery at Eckernförde. She was consequently captured by the Prussians with the loss of 200 of her 300 crew.

== 7 April ==
List of shipwrecks: 7 April 1849
Ship	State	Description
James Harvey	United Kingdom	The schooner was driven ashore at Nahant, Massachusetts, United States.

== 8 April ==
List of shipwrecks: 8 April 1849
Ship	State	Description
Earl Grey	United Kingdom	The ship was driven ashore and wrecked at Glenarm, County Antrim.
Helen	United Kingdom	The sloop was driven ashore 1.5 nautical miles (2.8 km) north of Blyth, Northumberland. Her crew were rescued. She was on a voyage from Louth, Lincolnshire to Newcastle upon Tyne, Northumberland.

== 9 April ==
List of shipwrecks: 9 April 1849
Ship	State	Description
Betsey	United Kingdom	The ship was wrecked in Robin Hoods Bay, Yorkshire.

== 10 April ==
List of shipwrecks: May 1849
Ship	State	Description
Arabella	United States	The ship was destroyed by fire in Freshwater Bay, Newfoundland.
Coldstream	United Kingdom	The brig departed from Montego Bay, Jamaica for London. She was subsequently wrecked in the Cayman Islands.
Downes	United Kingdom	The brig was driven ashore at Sandy Hook, New Jersey, United States. She had been refloated by 18 April and taken in to New York, United States.
Eclipse	United Kingdom	The ship ran aground on the Goodwin Sands, Kent. She was on a voyage from Dunkirk, Nord, France to Gloucester. She was refloated and beached in Pegwell Bay.
Queen Victoria	United Kingdom	The schooner ran aground and sank on the Longsand, in the North Sea off the coast of Essex with the loss of her captain. Survivors were rescued by the lugger Intrepid (United Kingdom). Queen Victoria was on a voyage from Rostock to London.

== 11 April ==
List of shipwrecks: 11 April 1849
Ship	State	Description
Crescent	United Kingdom	The brig ran aground and sank in the River Tay. Her crew survives. She was on a voyage from Dundee, Forfarshire to a Baltic port.
Rose	United Kingdom	The fishing trawler was in collision with a brig and sank between Cromer and Happisburgh, Norfolk. Her crew were rescued.
Vanguard	(United Kingdom of Great Britain and Ireland) British North America	The ship was wrecked on the Black Ledge, off the coast of Nova Scotia.

== 12 April ==
List of shipwrecks: 12 April 1849
Ship	State	Description
Crescent	United Kingdom	The ship was wrecked on the Abertay Sands, in the North Sea off the coast of Forfarshire, She was on a voyage from Dundee, Forfarshire to a Baltic port.
Hope	France	The schooner ran aground at South Shields, County Durham, United Kingdom. She was on a voyage from South Shields to Alexandria, Egypt. She was refloated.

== 13 April ==
List of shipwrecks: 13 April 1849
Ship	State	Description
Ann and Elizabeth	United Kingdom	The ship was in collision with a schooner and sank in the North Sea. Her crew were rescued.
Jane	United Kingdom	The schooner was wrecked at Rocky Point, Belize City, British Honduras. All on board were rescued.
Lady Alice	United Kingdom	The sloop was driven ashore and damaged at Helsdale, Sutherland. She was refloated.
Sundsvall	Sweden	The schooner was driven ashore and wrecked at "Trefontane", Sicily. She was on a voyage from Galaţi, Ottoman Empire to Cork or Falmouth, Cornwall, United Kingdom.
Village Maid	United Kingdom	The ship was driven ashore near Blyth, Northumberland. She was on a voyage from North Sunderland, County Durham to Newcastle upon Tyne, Northumberland. She was refloated and taken in to Blyth.

== 14 April ==
List of shipwrecks: 14 April 1849
Ship	State	Description
Francis	United States	The ship was wrecked on the Caicos Reef. Her crew were rescued.
Jessie Stevens	United Kingdom	The ship was wrecked on the North Gar Sand, off the mouth of the River Tees. Her crew were rescued. She was on a voyage from Newcastle upon Tyne, Northumberland to London.
Tatalina	United Kingdom	The ship was driven ashore and damaged at Runswick, Yorkshire.

== 15 April ==
List of shipwrecks: 15 April 1849
Ship	State	Description
Friendship	United Kingdom	The sloop sprang a leak and foundered 7 nautical miles (13 km) south of the Dudgeon Sandbank, in the North Sea. Her crew survived.
Honor	United Kingdom	The ship was driven ashore 12 nautical miles (22 km) west of Stralsund. She was on a voyage from Stralsund to London.
Northumbria	United Kingdom	The brig was driven ashore and wrecked 3 nautical miles (5.6 km) north of Scarborough, Yorkshire. Her crew survived.

== 16 April ==
List of shipwrecks: 16 April 1849
Ship	State	Description
Brenda	United Kingdom	The ship ran aground on the Burbo Bank, in Liverpool Bay. She was on a voyage from Smyrna, Ottoman Empire to Liverpool, Lancashire. She was refloated and taken in to Liverpool in a leaky condition.
Mary Ann	United Kingdom	The schooner was in collision with Amphitrite (United Kingdom) and was abandoned in the English Channel off Beachy Head, Sussex. She was on a voyage from Cádiz, Spain to London. Mary Ann was taken in to Boulogne, Pas-de-Calais, France.
Norham Castle	United Kingdom	The brig ran aground on the Scroby Sands, Norfolk. She was refloated.
Roses	United Kingdom	The schooner sprang a leak in the North Sea off St. Abbs Head, Berwickshire. She was beached at Coldingham, Berwickshire, where she was wrecked. Her five crew survived. She was on a voyage from Kirkintilloch, Renfrewshire to Newcastle upon Tyne, Northumberland.
Wave	United States	The schooner was wrecked in the Tusket Islands, Nova Scotia, British North America. She was on a voyage from Boston, Massachusetts to Halifax, Nova Scotia.

== 17 April ==
List of shipwrecks: 17 April 1849
Ship	State	Description
Elephanta	Denmark	The sloop was driven ashore and wrecked at Grainthorpe, Lincolnshire, United Kingdom. Her crew were rescued. She was on a voyage from London, United Kingdom to Nyborg.
Enterprise	United Kingdom	The ship was driven ashore at Spurn Point, Yorkshire. She was refloated and taken in to Grimsby, Lincolnshire.
Good Intent	United Kingdom	The ship was driven ashore at Skegness, Lincolnshire. She was on a voyage from Boston, Lincolnshire to Goole, Yorkshire. She was refloated on 21 April and taken in to Boston for repairs.
Haabet	Norway	The yacht was sunk by ice off Svelvigen. Her crew were rescued.
Lalla Rookh	United Kingdom	The ship was driven ashore at Auckland, New Zealand. She was on a voyage from Wellington to Auckland. She was refloated.
Lord Seaham	United Kingdom	The ship was driven ashore at Cowden, Yorkshire. Her crew were rescued. She was on a voyage from Cowes, Isle of Wight to Newcastle upon Tyne, Northumberland.
Thetis	United Kingdom	The ship was driven ashore on Læsø, Denmark. She was on a voyage from Liverpool, Lancashire to Saint Petersburg, Russia. She was refloated on 2 May and taken in to Helsingør, Denmark.

== 18 April ==
List of shipwrecks: 18 April 1849
Ship	State	Description
Agenoria	United Kingdom	The ship was driven ashore at Penlee Point, Mousehole, Cornwall. She was on a voyage from Plymouth, Devon to a Welsh port. She was refloated on 24 April and taken in to Penzance, Cornwall.
Ann and Mary	United Kingdom	The ship was driven ashore and damaged at Dungarvan, County Waterford. She was on a voyage from Dublin to Dungarvan. She was refloated.
Echo	(United Kingdom of Great Britain and Ireland) Jersey	The barque was driven ashore on Jersey.
Lark	United Kingdom	The ship was driven ashore and severely damaged at St. Michael's Mouht, Cornwall. Her crew were rescued. She was on a voyage from Plymouth, Devon to Neath, Glamorgan.
Laurel	United Kingdom	The ship was driven ashore at Larne, County Antrim. She was on a voyage from Runcorn, Cheshire to Pärnu, Russia. She was refloated on 24 April.
Lively	United Kingdom	The ship sank off The Mumbles, Glamorgan. she was refloated on 22 April.
Myriam	United Kingdom	The ship was wrecked at "Albisala". Her crew were rescued. She was on a voyage from Genoa to Savona, Kingdom of Sardinia.
Veronica	United Kingdom	The ship ran aground on the Annet Sand, in the North Sea off the coast of Forfarshire. Her crew were rescued.

== 19 April ==
List of shipwrecks: 19 April 1849
Ship	State	Description
Active	United Kingdom	The brig was driven ashore on the Castle Cornet Rocks, off Guernsey, Channel Islands. She was on a voyage from Guernsey to Newfoundland, British North America.
Andorinha	Portugal	The ship was driven ashore and wrecked at Deal, Kent, United Kingdom. She was on a voyage from Lisbon to Hamburg.
Blazer	United Kingdom	The yacht was driven ashore and sank at Dublin.
Bloomfield	United Kingdom	The brig was driven ashore near Three Fathom Harbour, Nova Scotia, British North America. She was on a voyage from New York, United States to Halifax, Nova Scotia.
Clio	United Kingdom	The brig was wrecked on the Goodwin Sands, Kent. Her ten crew were rescued. She was on a voyage from Licata, Sicily to Newcastle upon Tyne, Northumberland.
Dream	United Kingdom	The yacht was driven ashore and sank at Dublin.
Ernest Theodore	France	The ship was wrecked at Capbreton, Landes. Her crew were rescued. She was on a voyage from Bayonne, Basses-Pyrénées to Nantes, Loire-Inférieure.
Friends	United Kingdom	The ship was driven ashore at Whitstable, Kent.
Harmony	United Kingdom	The ship was driven ashore and wrecked at Dublin.
Hellespont	Ottoman Empire	The steamship ran aground in the Madeleine Passage.
Lady Jane	United Kingdom	The ship struck a sunken rock and sank in the Sound of Kerrara. She was on a voyage from Liverpool, Lancashire to Port Gordon, Moray.
Love and Unity	United Kingdom	The brig was wrecked on The Needles, Isle of Wight with the loss of one of her six crew. She was on a voyage from South Shields, County Durham to Poole, Dorset.
Margaret	United Kingdom	The smack was driven ashore and wrecked at Grey Point, County Down. Her crew were rescued. She was on a voyage from Drogheda, County Louth to Belfast, County Antrim.
Martha Washington	United States	The ship was wrecked at Getares, Spain with the loss of two lives. She was on a voyage from Marseille, Bouches-du-Rhône, France to New York.
Mary	United Kingdom	The fishing trawler was driven ashore at Dublin. She was refloated.
Nouvelle Eu	France	The ship was wrecked at "Norir" with the loss of all hands.
Para Packet	United Kingdom	The ship sank at Whitstable. Her crew were rescued.
Queen	United Kingdom	The Humber Keel was driven ashore at Harwich, Essex.
Triton	United Kingdom	The schooner ran aground on the Half Ebb Rock, in the North Sea off the coast of Essex and was damaged.
Tullimet	United Kingdom	The ship ran aground on the Lappen Grunden. She was on a voyage from Grangemouth, Stirlingshire to Pillau, Prussia.

== 20 April ==
List of shipwrecks: 20 April 1849
Ship	State	Description
Fidelity	United Kingdom	The schooner was driven onto the Herd Sand, in the North Sea off the coast of County Durham. She was refloated and towed in to South Shields, County Durham.
Rainbow	(United Kingdom of Great Britain and Ireland) New South Wales	The schooner was wrecked at Wanganui, New Zealand. All on board were rescued.
Tullimet	United Kingdom	The ship ran aground at Helsingør, Denmark. She was on a voyage from Grangemouth, Stirlingshire to Pillau, Prussia.
Wilson	United Kingdom	The ship ran aground on the Colorados, off the coast of Cuba and was damaged. She was on a voyage from Hull, Yorkshire to Havana, Cuba. She floated off, but was abandoned the next day.

== 21 April ==
List of shipwrecks: 21 April 1849
Ship	State	Description
Bon Père	(flag) France	The ship was wrecked on the Samaná Peninsula, Dominican Republic. She was on a voyage from La Rochelle, Charente-Maritime to Jérémie, Haiti.
Favourite	United Kingdom	The ship was driven ashore near Domesnes, Russia.
Joven Lucie	Spain	The ship was driven ashore at Leysdown, Kent, United Kingdom. She was on a voyage from Tarragona to London, United Kingdom. She was refloated on 25 April.
Mary and Elizabeth	United Kingdom	The smack sank at the entrance to the Glamorganshire Canal. She had been refloated by 23 April.
Olimpie	France	The barque was wrecked at Algeciras, Spain. She was on a voyage from Marseille, Bouches-du-Rhône to Senegal.
Wisconsin	United States	The ship ran aground at New York. She was on a voyage from New York to Liverpool, Lancashire, United Kingdom.

== 22 April ==
List of shipwrecks: 22 April 1849
Ship	State	Description
Coverdale	United Kingdom	The ship was sunk by ice off St. Paul Island, Nova Scotia, British North America. Her crew were rescued. She was on a voyage from Sunderland, County Durham to Montreal, Province of Canada, British North America.
St. Anne	United Kingdom	The ship ran aground and sank south of the Banana Islands, Sierra Leone. She was on a voyage from Sierra Leone to London.
Volgange	Sweden	The sloop ran aground on the Sundischen Wicse.

== 23 April ==
List of shipwrecks: 23 April 1849
Ship	State	Description
George and Mary	United Kingdom	The sloop was struck by lightning, caught fire and sank in Robin Hoods Bay. Her crew survived.
Olympio	France	The ship was wrecked south of Algeciras, Spain. She was on a voyage from Marseille, Bouches-du-Rhône to the River Gambia.
Triune	United Kingdom	The ship ran aground on the Swine Bottoms, in the Baltic Sea of the coast of Denmark. She was on a voyage from London to a Baltic port. She was refloated and put in to Helsingør, Denmark.

== 24 April ==
List of shipwrecks: 24 April 1849
Ship	State	Description
Gipsy	(United Kingdom of Great Britain and Ireland) British North America.	The ship was wrecked on Grand Cayman, Cayman Islands. She was on a voyage from Halifax, Nova Scotia to New Orleans, Louisiana, United States.
Primrose	United Kingdom	The ship ran aground on the Gunfleet Sand, in the North Sea off the coast of Essex. She was refloated on 26 April with assistance from the smacks Joseph and Orwell (both United Kingdom) and taken in to Harwich, Essex in a leaky condition.
Ramses	France	The steamship was wrecked at Trapani, Sicily. All 60 people on board survived. She was on a voyage from Malta to Trapani.
Soho	United Kingdom	The steamship was driven ashore at Sluis Gatte, Zeeland, Netherlands. Her passengers were taken off by the steamship Director (United Kingdom). Soho was on a voyage from London to Antwerp, Belgium. She was later refloated and put back to Deptford, Kent, where she arrived on 7 May.

== 25 April ==
List of shipwrecks: April 1849
Ship	State	Description
Ellen Walker	(United Kingdom of Great Britain and Ireland) Saint Kitts	The schooner was wrecked on St. Paul's Reef. Her crew were rescued. She was on a voyage from Saint Kitts to Saint Thomas, Virgin Islands.
Mandingo	United Kingdom	The ship ran aground on the Whitby Rock. She was refloated and put in to Scarborough. Yorkshire in a leaky condition.
Mary Bulmer	United Kingdom	The ship ran aground in the Bosphorus off Therapia, Ottoman Empire.
Messenger	United Kingdom	The ship ran aground at Constantinople, Ottoman Empire. She was refloated.
Miranda	United Kingdom	The ship ran aground on the Newcombe Sand. She was on a voyage from London to Trinidad. She was refloated.
Newham	United Kingdom	The ship was lost off Mariel, Cuba. She was on a voyage from Limerick to Havana, Cuba.

== 26 April ==
List of shipwrecks: 26 April 1849
Ship	State	Description
Jane	United Kingdom	The ship ran aground on the Scroby Sands, Norfolk. She was on a voyage from London to Sunderland, County Durham. She was refloated and taken in to Great Yarmouth, Norfolk.

== 27 April ==
List of shipwrecks: 27 April 1849
Ship	State	Description
Fauvette	France	The full-rigged ship was driven ashore and wrecked at Manasquan, New Jersey, United States. She was on a voyage from Port-Vendres, Pyrénées-Orientales to New York, United States.

== 28 April ==
List of shipwrecks: 28 April 1849
Ship	State	Description
Leveret	United Kingdom	The schooner was driven ashore south of Southerness, Kirkcudbrightshire.
Pledge	United Kingdom	The whaler, a smack, foundered off the coast of Greenland. Her nineteen crew survived.

== 29 April ==
List of shipwrecks: 29 April 1849
Ship	State	Description
Chieftain	United Kingdom	The brig was sunk by ice off the coast of British North America. Her crew were rescued.
Eleanor Hughes	United Kingdom	The ship ran aground on the Swine Bottoms, in the Baltic Sea off the coast of Denmark. She was on a voyage from Newport, Monmouthshire to Stettin. She was refloated the next day and resumed her voyage.
Hannah	United Kingdom	The brig was holed by ice and foundered in the Gulf of Saint Lawrence with the loss of 49 lives. About 129 people were rescued by the barque Nicaragua (United Kingdom). Hannah was on a voyage from Newry, County Antrim to Quebec City, Canada.
Ocean Queen	(United Kingdom of Great Britain and Ireland) British North America	The ship was wrecked on the Half Moon Rock, off the coast of Nova Scotia. Her crew were rescued.
Torrance	United Kingdom	The full-rigged ship foundered in the Atlantic Ocean. Her crew took to the boat. They were rescued on 6 May by Fingalton (United Kingdom). Torrance was on a voyage from Liverpool, Lancashire to Montreal, Province of Canada, British North America.

== 30 April ==
List of shipwrecks: 30 April 1849
Ship	State	Description
Gregorius	United Kingdom	The ship was lost off "Trefontana" Sicily. She was on a voyage from Galaţi, Ottoman Empire to a British port.
Jane	United Kingdom	The ship was abandoned in the Atlantic Ocean and was presumed to have subsequently sank. Her crew were rescued by Trafalgar (United Kingdom). Jane was on a voyage from Liverpool, Lancashire to Yarmouth, Nova Scotia, British North America.
Kingston	United Kingdom	The ship was wrecked near Castletownshend, County Cork. She was on a voyage from New Orleans, Louisiana, United States to Liverpool.
Two Friends	United Kingdom	The ship departed from Panama City, Republic of New Granada for San Francisco, Alta California. No further trace, presumed foundered with the loss of all hands.

== Unknown date ==
List of shipwrecks: Unknown date in April 1849
Ship	State	Description
Empress	United Kingdom	The ship ran aground off Cape St. Mary, Portugal. She was on a voyage from Livorno, Grand Duchy of Tuscany to a British port. She was refloated and put in to Faro, Portugal, where she was condemned.
Fidelity	United Kingdom	The schooner ran aground on the Herd Sand, in the North Sea off the coast of County Durham. She was refloated on 20 April and towed in to South Shields, County Durham.
Firefly	United Kingdom	The ship ran aground in Salonica Bay and was damaged. She was on a voyage from Salonica, Greece to Cork. She was refloated and put in to Malta, where she arrived on 22 April.
Hibernia	United Kingdom	The ship ran aground on the Round Reef, off Saint John, New Brunswick, British North America before 28 April. She was on a voyage from Glasgow, Renfrewshire to Saint John. She was refloated the next day and assisted in to Saint John.
Iris	United Kingdom	The ship foundered in the Mediterranean Sea off Zembra, Beylik of Tunis before 26 April.
Little Briton	United Kingdom	The ship foundered in St. Ives Bay in late April.
Marquis of Normanby	(United Kingdom of Great Britain and Ireland) British North America	The ship was driven ashore in the Belfast Lough. She was on a voyage from New York, United States to the Clyde.
Ocean Queen	United Kingdom	The ship was driven ashore at Sandy Hook, New Jersey, United States before 17 April. She was on a voyage from Jamaica to New York. She was refloated on 21 April and towed in to New York.
Old England	United Kingdom	The ship was driven ashore in the Yangtse Kiang. She was on a voyage from Liverpool, Lancashire to Shanghai, China. She was refloated.
Speculator	United Kingdom	The ship ran aground off the coast of Florida, United States. She was on a voyage from Liverpool to Tampico, Mexico. She was refloated and taken in to Key West, Florida, where she was condemned.
Swatara	United States	The ship was driven ashore south of the Delaware Capesbefore 26 April. She was on a voyage from Liverpool, Lancashire, United Kingdom to Philadelphia, Pennsylvania. She was refloated on 27 April but was again driven ashore and was wrecked.
Thistle	United Kingdom	The brig was wrecked at "Viller", Pas-de-Calais, France. Her crew were rescued.
Vrouw Antje	Netherlands	The ship ran aground on the Pezxmerwad. She was on a voyage from Amsterdam, North Holland to Hamburg. She was refloated and taken in to Ezumerzijl, Friesland.
Wismar	Grand Duchy of Mecklenburg-Schwerin	The ship was in collision with another vessel and sank off Lemnos, Greece.
