= Vanitha Viththi =

Sri Lankan Sinhala language newspaper

- Type: Weekly newspaper
- Owner: Times of Ceylon Limited
- Founded: 1957
- Language: Sinhala
- City: Colombo
- Country: Ceylon
- Sister newspapers: Ceylon Daily Mirror; Lankadeepa; Morning Times; Sri Lankadeepa; Sunday Mirror; Sunday Times of Ceylon; The Times of Ceylon

The Vanitha Viththi was a Sinhala language weekly newspaper in Ceylon published by Times of Ceylon Limited (TOCL). It was founded in 1957 and was published from Colombo. In 1966 it had an average net sales of 23,215. It had an average circulation of 30,507 in 1973.

TOCL was nationalised by the Sri Lankan government in August 1977. The state-run TOCL faced financial and labour problems and on 31 January 1985 it and its various publications closed down.

The magazine's first editor was Eva Ranaweera.
