= Boulder Beer Company =

The Boulder Beer Company was Colorado's first microbrew and the forty-third licensed brewery in the United States. It was founded on September 25, 1979 by David Hummer, Alvin Nelson, and Randolf Ware. Ware and Hummer were physics professors at the University of Colorado Boulder and home brewers. When the laws surrounding home brewing were relaxed, the brewery originally started on a farm in a "goatshack."

== History ==
The Boulder Beer Company was originally known as the Boulder Brewing Company and went public in 1980, raising over $1.7 million. A decade later, in 1990, the company changed its name to Boulder Beer Company when Gina Day took the company private. In 1993 the company again renamed itself as the "Rockies Brewing Company." In 2002, the Rockies Brewing Company entered into a strategic agreement with Rock Bottom Breweries allowing Rock Bottom to brew and sell their Singletrack Ale.

In 2005, the company again changed its name back to the Boulder Beer Company.

On January 6, 2020, the company announced a plan to sell its brewpub and focus on contract brewing.

On January 18, 2020, Boulder Beer closed its brewpub located at Wilderness Place and announced the site would be up for sale.

In 2020, Sleeping Giant out of Denver, CO took over the rights of Boulder Beer, with original owners and brewmasters still being involved in decisions going forward. Osterman, a Boulder local himself, came of (legal) age on Boulder Beer and couldn’t imagine a world without beer from the Colorado brewery that started it all. Conveniently, Matt already ran a brewery silently famous for helping multiple Colorado brewers increase production beyond their current capacities. So taking the full reigns of Boulder Beer was an easy, full heart decision for him.

At the beginning of 2021, Boulder Beer revealed a new brand design, logo, and look all created by fellow Boulderites. They brought back old favorites like Mojo, Shake, and Hazed and Infused as well as introducing new names like SKO (originally Buffalo Gold Beer) and new concepts like Bubbly By Nature, and one of a kind Bubbly IPA.

== Activities ==
The Boulder Beer Company is also known for being civic minded. In 2008, it became a sponsoring partner in Boulder's "10 for a Change Challenge," a program designed to reduce energy consumption by 10% via eco-friendly improvements for increased energy efficiency. In addition to being a sponsor for the challenge, the Pub is already PACE Certified (Partners for a Clean Environment) using bio-diesel fuel, recycled/compostable "to go" containers, and recycling. The brewery uses 100% recycled 6-pack carriers and non-petroleum based inks.

Every year, the Boulder Beer Company participates in "Beer 4 Boobs," a nationwide charity program raising money for the Susan G Komen Breast Cancer Foundation. They also host an annual "Goatshed Revival" Beer Festival in honor of their first brewery that was in a shed shared by goats. Part of the planning of the revival is a homebrew competition wherein homebrewers compete to have the Boulder Beer Company brew and distribute their homebrew. Proceeds from the Goatshed Revival are donated to the Community Food Share, a non-profit organization feeding the community's poor.

== Awards and accolades ==
In 1994, Ernst and Young awarded Gina Day, the owner of the company, with their Entrepreneur of the Year Award.

Beer	Competition	Category	Year	Place
Never Summer Ale	2004 World Beer Cup	Strong Ale	2004	Gold Medal
Sundance Amber Ale	2000 World Beer Cup		2000	Silver Medal
Sweaty Betty Blonde	2004 US Beer Tasting Championships	Southwest (Wheat Beer)	2004	Best of the Rockies
Planet Porter	Great American Beer Festival		1992	Gold Medal
Planet Porter	World Beer Championships		1997	Silver Medal
Singletrack Copper Ale	All About Beer Magazine		2000	Voted Best of the Best
Singletrack Copper Ale	World Beer Cup		2002	Silver Medal
Singletrack Copper Ale	World Beer Cup		2004	Bronze Medal
Pass Time Pale Ale	World Beer Championships		1997	Silver Medal
Buffalo Gold	World Beer Cup		2000	Silver Medal
Pass Time Pale Ale	World Beer Championships		1997	Silver Medal
Hazed & Infused	Boulder Brewfest		2003	Bronze Medal

== See also ==
- List of microbreweries
