= Richard Lionel Spittel =

Ceylonese physician and author

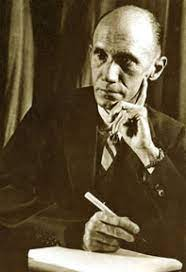
- Born: 9 December 1881; Tangalle, Ceylon
- Died: 3 September 1969 (aged 87); Colombo, Ceylon
- Education: Royal College, Colombo, Ceylon Medical College
- Occupations: surgeon, author, anthropologist
- Spouse: Claribel Frances Van Dort
- Children: Christine, Yvonne
- Relatives: Frederick George Spittel (father); Zilia Eleanor Andree née Jansz (mother)

Richard Lionel Spittel, CMG, CBE, FRCS (commonly known as Dr. R. L. Spittel) (9 December 1881 – 3 September 1969) was a Ceylonese physician and author. He was one of the foremost experts on the Vedda community.

== Education and career ==
Richard Lionel Spittel was born in Tangalle on 9 December 1881, the fourth child of Dr Frederick George Spittel (1853–1943) (who later became a District Medical Officer in Ceylon Health Service) and Zilia Eleanor Andree née Jansz (1855–?). Spittel received his education at Royal College, Colombo and the Ceylon Medical College, where he passed LMS in 1905. Thereafter he joined the government medical service and was sent to England in 1906 to complete his higher education. There he finished conjoint diploma in 1908 and took FRCS in 1909.

Returning to Ceylon in 1910, he was appointed the Third Surgeon at the General Hospital Colombo. Going on to be a senior surgeon and a lecturer at the Ceylon Medical College, he retired in 1935, yet worked as a consultant surgeon and was made a Commander of the Order of the British Empire in 1942 and a Companion of the Order of St Michael and St George in 1950 for his services towards medicine and surgery. A lifelong member of the British Medical Association, he was the President of its Ceylon Branch from 1940 to 1946. He served as President of Dutch Burgher Union of Ceylon from 1936 to 1938.

== Author ==
An avid nature-lover, Spittel made many trips to the jungles of Ceylon, gaining much knowledge of the flora and fauna and the aborigines of the island, the Veddas. His studies on the Veddas made him and expert on this little understood people. Based on his ethnographic studies, he authored several books that gained much fame during his lifetime. His works include novels, poetry and academic studies.

== Personal ==
Spittel married a fellow medical student Claribel Frances Van Dort, daughter of one of Ceylon's most distinguished physicians and a member of the Legislative Council of Ceylon, Dr William Gregory van Dort, on 28 December 1911 at St Michael and All Angels' Church, Colombo. They had two daughters, Christine and Yvonne. Spittel died on 3 September 1969, at the age of 87.

== Bibliography ==
Novels

- Savage Sanctuary (1941)
- Vanished Trails (1950)
- Where the White Sambhur Roams (1951)
- Wild White Boy (1958)
- Brave Island (1966)

Non-fiction

- Wild Ceylon (1924)
- Far-off Things (1933)

Poetry

- Leaves of the Jungle

Medical books

- A Basis of Surgical Ward Work (1915)
- A Preliminary Course of Surgery (1918)
- Framboesia Tropica (1923)
- Essentials of Surgery

== External links and References ==
- R. L. Spittel, C.M.G., C.B.E., L.M.S., F.R.C.S., British Medical Journal, 1969
- Dr. R. L. Spittel: Surgeon of the wilderness
- R. L. Spittle: Master writer of the wilds, by J. A. K. Jayakody
- Continuing the saga of Richard Spittel
