= Morning Times (Ceylon) =

Sri Lankan English language newspaper

- Type: Daily newspaper
- Owner: Times of Ceylon Limited
- Founded: 1954
- Ceased publication: 1958
- Language: English
- City: Colombo
- Country: Ceylon
- Sister newspapers: Ceylon Daily Mirror; Lankadeepa; Sri Lankadeepa; Sunday Mirror; Sunday Times of Ceylon; The Times of Ceylon; Vanitha Viththi
- OCLC number: 220855099

The Morning Times was an English language daily newspaper in Ceylon published by Times of Ceylon Limited (TOCL). It was founded in 1954 and was published from Colombo. It ceased publication in 1958.
