= William Gregory van Dort =

Ceylonese Burgher physician and politician

Dr William Gregory van Dort
- Born: 24 October 1841; Colombo, Ceylon
- Died: 26 October 1921 (aged 80); Colombo, Ceylon
- Education: St. Paul's Parochial School, Pettah, Colombo Academy
- Alma mater: University of Aberdeen
- Occupations: surgeon, politician
- Spouse(s): Caroline Lankenstein (m.1860); Sophia Marion McCarthy (m.1870)
- Children: 8

Dr William Gregory van Dort (24 October 1841 – 26 October 1921) was a Ceylonese Burgher physician and politician.

== Education and career ==
William Gregory van Dort was born in Colombo on 24 October 1841, the seventh child of Johannes Jacobus van Dort (1801–1876) and Petronella Margaretta née Kalenberg (1806–1847). The family lived in San Sebastian (Small Pass), which adjoins Pettah, with Van Dort and his siblings attending school at St. Paul's Parochial School in Pettah and Colombo Academy. His eldest brother, John Leonard Kalenberg, was a 19th-century artist.

Van Dort studied in Madras and Calcutta receiving a Licentiate in Medicine and Surgery from the Calcutta Medical College. He travelled to the United Kingdom and studied at the University of Aberdeen, graduating with a degree in medicine and surgery in 1864. He went on to travel extensively around Europe, before returning to Ceylon. He served as assistant Colonial Surgeon in charge of the Gampola Hospital. Van Dort highlighted the significant mortality rates of Indian migrant labour, authoring the Report on the Gampola Civic Hospital in 1870, where he identified the death rate amongst all new workers as being as high as 25%. Whilst the report was heavily criticised by plantation owners it did result in Governor William Gregory reviewing the regulations governing the control of migrant labour.

In 1887 van Dort was one of the fifteen founding members of the Ceylonese branch of British Medical Association, now known as the Sri Lanka Medical Association, serving as the ninth branch president, from 1900 to 1903.

Between 1909 and 1911 van Dort acted on several occasions as the unofficial member of the Legislative Council of Ceylon representing the Burgher community, in the absence of the sitting member, Frederick Charles Loos. During his tenure on the Legislative Council van Dort called for tuberculosis to be recognised as an infectious disease and that it be treated through policies on isolation, special hospitals and compulsory notification.

== Personal ==
In c.1860 van Dort married Countess Caroline Lackenstein (c.1845-1861) in Calcutta, West Bengal, India. She died approximately a year later in 1861. He subsequently re-married Sophia Marion McCarthy (1851-1921), daughter of Rev. Edward McCarthy and Sophia Smith, in 1870 at the Scots Kirk, Kandy. They had eight children together, their fifth child, Claribel Frances, married Richard Lionel Spittel in 1911. Van Dort died on 26 October 1921, twelve days after his wife's death.
