= The Times of Ceylon =

English language daily newspaper in Sri Lanka

- Type: Daily newspaper
- Owner: Times of Ceylon Limited
- Founded: 11 July 1846
- Ceased publication: 1985
- Language: English
- City: Colombo
- Country: Sri Lanka
- Sister newspapers: Ceylon Daily Mirror; Lankadeepa; Morning Times; Sri Lankadeepa; Sunday Mirror; Sunday Times of Ceylon; Vanitha Viththi
- OCLC number: 1781454

The Times of Ceylon was an English language daily newspaper in Sri Lanka published by Times of Ceylon Limited (TOCL). It was founded in 1846 as the Ceylon Times and was published from Colombo. It ceased publication in 1985.

== History ==
The Ceylon Times started on 11 July 1846 using the printing press of the defunct The Ceylon Herald. The newspaper was established to oppose The Observer and promote the mercantile interests of British colonials. Initially it was published on Tuesdays and Fridays.

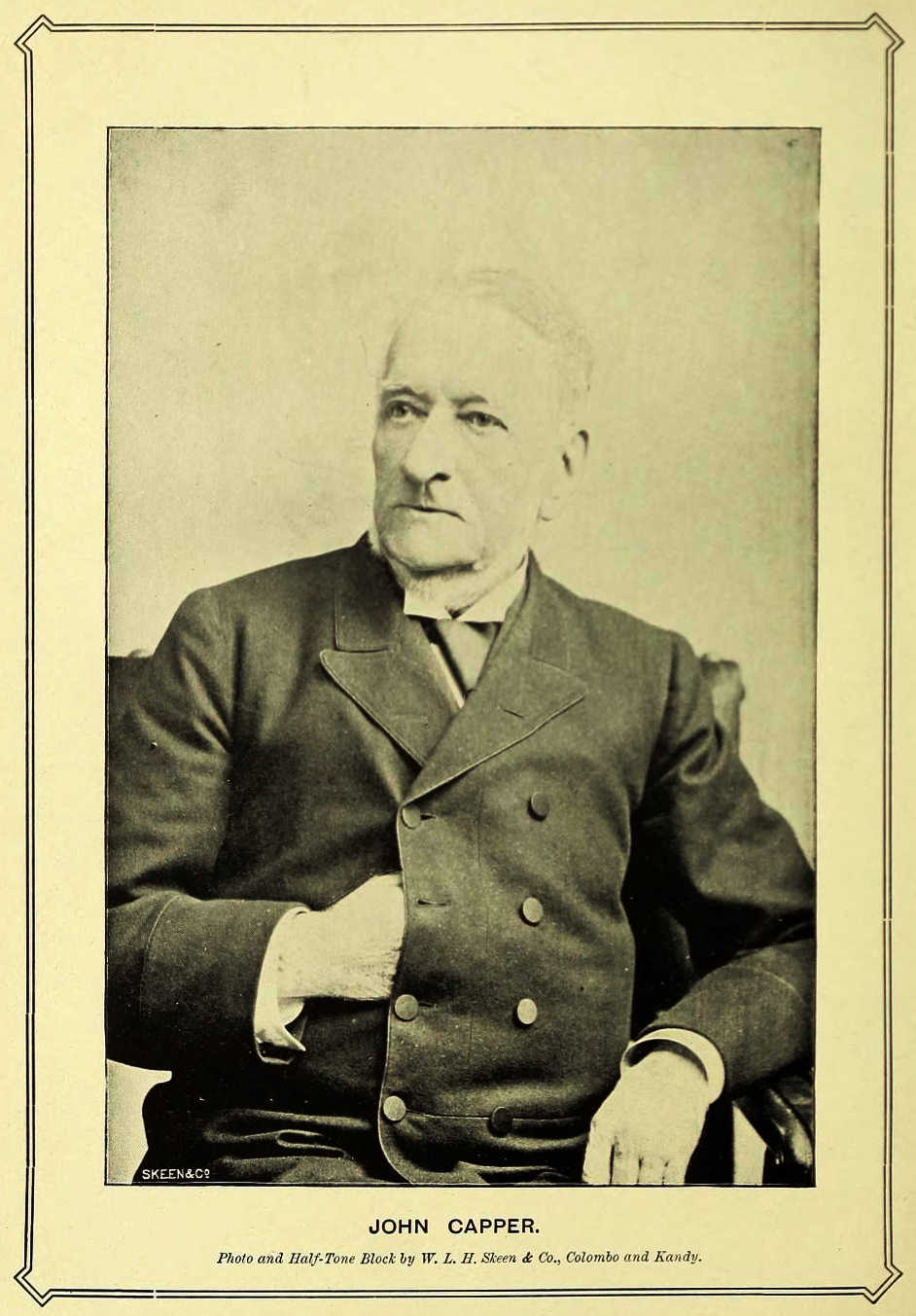
John Capper

In 1858 the paper's owners Wilson, Ritchie & Co. sold it to John Capper, a former sub-editor of The Globe. Capper sold the paper to Alexander Allardyce in 1874 and returned to Britain. The paper's fortunes waned under the new owners and it went into liquidation. Capper returned to Ceylon and with the help of his son Frank A. Capper, a coffee planter from Haputale, took control of the paper, which was now called The Times of Ceylon, in 1882. Capper's eldest son Herbert H. Capper also joined the running of the paper. The newspaper flourished and became the leading Ceylonese newspaper read by plantation owners and European residents. The newspaper became an evening daily in 1883. John Capper left Ceylon 1884, leaving the management of the paper in the hands of his two sons. In 1903, Arumugam Sangarapillai became sole proprietor of the newspaper, and later his son became managing director.

TOCL and its rival Associated Newspapers of Ceylon Limited (ANCL) dominated the newspaper industry when Ceylon obtained independence from Britain in 1948. ANCL and TOCL were nationalised by the Sri Lankan government in July 1973 and August 1977 respectively. The state-run TOCL faced financial and labour problems and on 31 January 1985 it and its various publications closed down. Ranjith Wijewardena, chairman of ANCL before nationalisation, bought the trade names and library of the TOCL publications. Wijewardena's company, Wijeya Newspapers, subsequently started various newspapers using the names of former TOCL publications.
