= Copper Mountain (Whatcom County, Washington) =

Mountain in Washington (state), United States

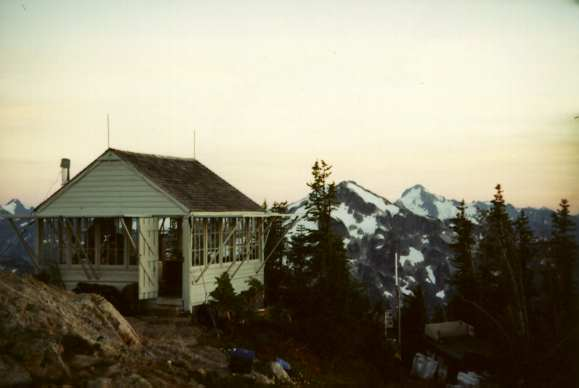
- Copper Mountain Lookout in North Cascades National Park, Whatcom County, Washington, USA

Highest point
- Elevation: 7,142 ft (2,177 m)
- Prominence: 1,822 ft (555 m)
- Coordinates: 48°56′25″N 121°28′00″W

Geography
- Location within Washington (state) Location within the United States
- Location: Whatcom County, Washington, U.S.
- Parent range: Cascade Range
- Topo map: USGS Copper Mountain

Copper Mountain (7,142 feet (2,177 m)) is in North Cascades National Park in the U.S. state of Washington. Located in the northern section of the park, Copper Mountain is to the east of Silesia Creek and 10 miles (16 km) northeast of Mount Shuksan.
