= Copper ale =

Style of beer

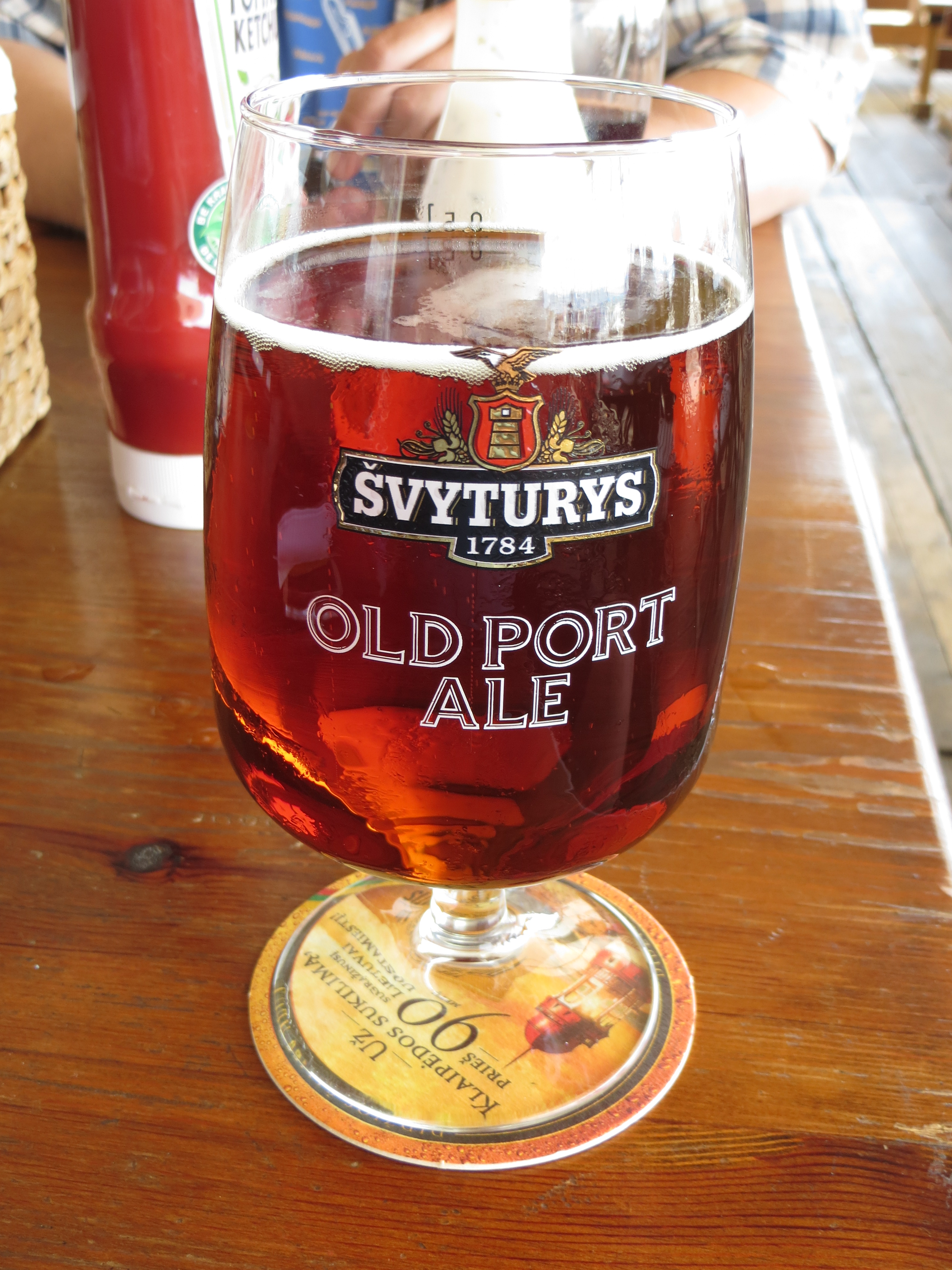
Svyturys Old Port Ale is a Scottish ale that has a copper color

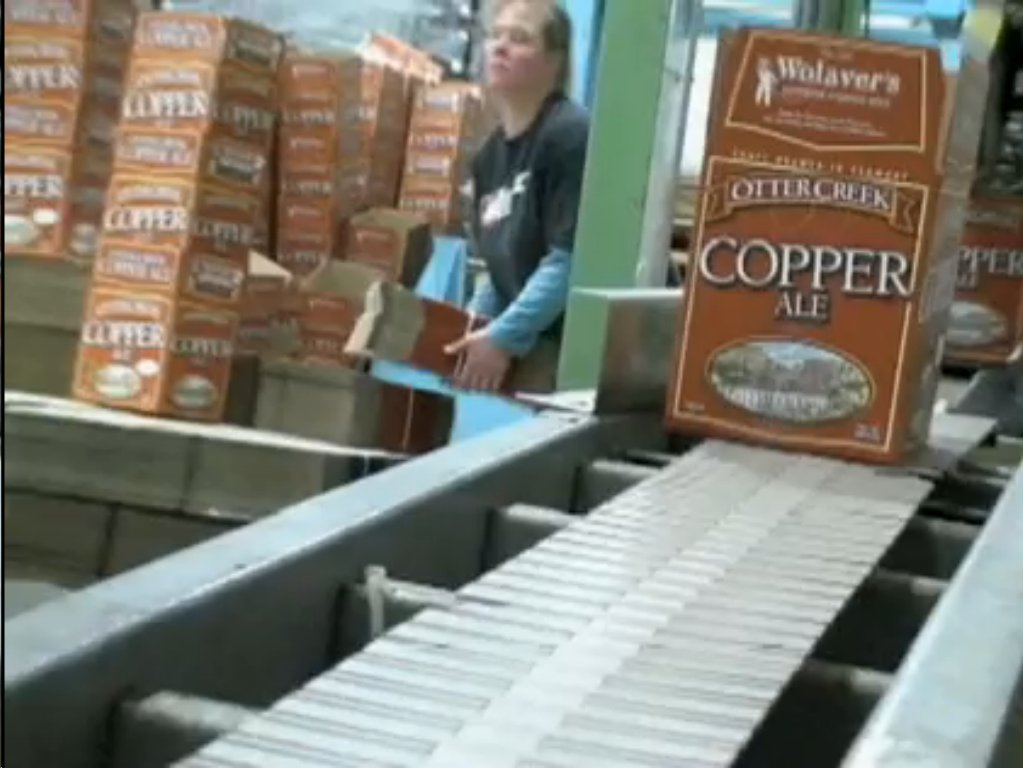
Finished bottles of Otter Creek Brewing's copper ale

Copper ale is a style of ale known in part for its copper color.

Some varieties of copper ale may be produced to have a bitter flavor, such as that of a bitter. Beer brewed with dark malt may contribute to a copper-colored beer.

== Producers ==
Copper ale is the flagship beer of Otter Creek Brewing, a craft brewery located in Middlebury, Vermont. It is also produced by other U.S. companies, such as Boulder Beer Company in Boulder, Colorado.

In Australia, the James Squire brand of copper ale named The Constable Copper Ale was produced. It was retired from production in 2017. It is also produced by Alosta Brewing Company in Covina, California, in collaboration with the band +LĪVE+ to celebrate their 8× platinum album Throwing Copper.

== See also ==
- Beer style
- Brew kettle – a large tank also known as a "copper"
- Cask ale
- Draught beer
