= Copper Mountain (British Columbia) =

Mountain in British Columbia, Canada

- Location within British Columbia
- Interactive map of Copper Mountain

Highest point
- Coordinates: 49°07′27″N 118°47′23″W

Geography
- Location: British Columbia, Canada
- District: Similkameen Division Yale Land District
- Topo map: NTS 82E2 Greenwood

This page is about the mountain in the Boundary Country near Greenwood, British Columbia. For the ghost town and former mine near Princeton see Copper Mountain, British Columbia

Copper Mountain is a mountain in British Columbia, north of Greenwood and north-west of Grand Forks.
