= Dudley v Dudley =

- Full case name: Lord Dudley and Ward, an infant, by the Honorable Thomas Newport v. Lady Dowager Dudley &c. & econt'
- Decided: 1705
- Citation: [1705] EngR 25; (1705) Prec Ch 241; 24 E.R. 118 (1 January 1705)

Court membership
- Judges sitting: Sir John Trevor, Master of the Rolls

Dudley v Dudley (1705) Prec Ch 241; 24 ER 118 is a 1705 case of the Court of Chancery commonly cited in textbooks on law for its statement on the nature of equity.

Lord Cowper, who gave the report, is sometimes misspelled as Lord Copper.

== Facts ==
Edward Ward 7th Baron Dudley and 2nd Baron Ward leased for 99 years real property in trust for himself for his life, then in trust to pay out of the rents, issues, and profits as annuities for his grandchildren (Edward Ward (the plaintive's father), son and heir of William Ward, eldest son of the 7th Baron Dudley; and William Ward, son of Ferdinando Dudley Ward second son of the seventh Baron Dudley); and to the grandchildren to 7th Baron Dudley's brother, William Ward, (Frances Porter and Catherine Porter). The remainder of the lease was in trust to the 7th Baron Dudley and heirs of his body male. The annuities arose on the death of the 7th Baron Dudley.

The seventh Baron Dudley died on 28 June 1701. Edward Ward a minor, (the plaintive's father) succeeded as the 8th Baron Dudley and 3rd Baron Ward, since his father predeceased the 7th Baron Dudley and received his annuity and the remainder of the lease in trust. The 8th Baron Dudley married Diana Howard, the defendant. The 8th Baron Dudley died on 20 March 1704 while his wife, Lady Diana was pregnant. On 16 June 1704 Lady Diana gave birth to Edward Ward, 9th Baron Dudley and fourth Baron Ward, the plaintive. Lady Diana brought a Writ of Dower at law that was granted but stayed enforcement because of the lease. This bill was filed by the Honorable Thomas Newport on behalf of the 9th Baron Dudley for administration the will of his father and great-grandfather. Lady Diana filed a cross bill demanding one third of the surplus of the lease after the payment of the annuities as her dower.

== Holding ==
"[T]he right of a dowress to her dower is not only a legal right, so adjudged at law, but is also a moral right, to be provided for, and to have a maintenance and sustenance out of her husband's estate to live upon; she is therefore in the care of the law, and a favourite of the law; and upon this moral law is the law of England founded, as to the right of dower."

"[A] marriage is as much a contract (and I am sure more sacred) and ought to be as much regarded and relieved, as a defective jointure."

The lady dowager has as her dower the benefit of this trust term, and that the trustees do account to her for the third part of the clear profits above the charge of any yearly annuities, from the death of her husband and from time to time for the future during the term, and the term to stand charged therewith during her life.

"[F]or what are the profits, but the lands, or what is the land, but the profits?"

== Nature of Equity ==
"Equity is no part of the law, but a moral virtue, which qualifies, moderates, and reforms the rigour, hardness and edge of the law, and is a universal truth. It does also assist the law, where it is defective and weak in the constitution (which is the life of the law), and defends the law from crafty evasions, delusions and mere subtleties, invented and contrived to evade and elude the common law, whereby such as have undoubted right are made remediless. And thus is the office of equity to protect and support the common law from shifts and contrivances against the justice of the law. Equity, therefore, does not destroy the law, nor create it, but assists it. "
