= James Capper (sculptor) =

British kinetic sculptor

- Born: 1987 (age 38–39); London, England
- Education: Chelsea College of Arts (BA); Royal College of Art (MA)
- Known for: Kinetic sculpture
- Notable work: MUDSKIPPER (2021); ATLAS PROTOTYPE (2015); MONITOR (2024)
- Awards: Jack Goldhill Prize for Sculpture (2009)

James Capper (born 1987) is a British kinetic sculptor based in London. He creates mobile mechanical works using industrial engineering and metalworking. His steel and hydraulic sculptures interact directly with their environments.

His work is in the permanent collection of the Science Museum, London. In 2009, he was the youngest artist to receive the Jack Goldhill Prize for Sculpture from the Royal Academy of Arts.

== Early life and education ==
Capper was born in London in 1987. Before attending art school, he learned industrial welding, steel fabrication, and mechanical engineering working on farms and in mechanics' workshops in Kent.

He completed his Bachelor of Arts in sculpture at Chelsea College of Arts in 2008 and received his Master of Arts in sculpture from the Royal College of Art in 2010.

== Work and process ==
A trained welder, Capper fabricates his machines himself. Several of his works are fully operational hydraulic machines that he controls during exhibitions.

Capper groups his sculptures into "Divisions" (including Earth Marking, Offshore, Aviation, and Material Handling) based on the terrains they navigate. He also builds hydraulic painting devices, such as the HYDRAPAINTER, which uses robotic arms to apply marine paint to canvas or paper.

== Notable projects ==
ATLAS PROTOTYPE (2015)
His 2015 hydraulic sculpture, ATLAS PROTOTYPE, uses a hydraulic motor to drive a milling head to carve its pedestal. It was acquired by the Science Museum, London in 2023 and is displayed in the museum's Engineers gallery.

MUDSKIPPER (2021)
In 2021, Capper debuted MUDSKIPPER, a 14.5-tonne amphibious sculpture adapted from a 1980s commercial Thames workboat. Co-commissioned by Battersea Power Station, Nine Elms, and the Royal Docks Team, it uses hydraulic legs to walk out of the river onto the foreshore. Capper demonstrated the sculpture in the River Thames and the Royal Docks during the summer of 2021.

MONITOR (2024)
In 2024, Capper exhibited MONITOR at the Royal Academy of Arts. Commissioned by the Ukrainian arts foundation Izolyatsia, the eight-metre mobile structure features four hydraulic legs and functions as a prototype off-grid studio for artists operating in post-conflict Kyiv.

== Awards and recognition ==
In 2009, while still a student, Capper became the youngest artist to be awarded the Jack Goldhill Prize for Sculpture by the Royal Academy of Arts. That same year, he was nominated for the Jerwood Sculpture Prize. In 2011, he received the Royal Society of British Sculptors Bursary Award.
