= Henry Capper =

Founder, South Australian Record newspaper

Henry Capper was the emigration clerk who founded the South Australian Record in 1837, a periodical published in London devoted to news from the colony of South Australia. The Record ran from 1837 to 1841 under several title changes. Capper also published two books addressed to prospective migrants to South Australia, both of which went through several editions. However there is no evidence that he ever visited Australia.

== The South Australian Record ==
In 1837 Capper founded the South Australian Record, a periodical published in London devoted to news from the colony of South Australia for the benefit of intending migrants and investors. A regular feature was publication of letters received by people in Britain from friends and relations who had settled in South Australia.

The Record was at first published monthly (price 5d.) by Capper and John Gliddon from an office at 37 Great Marlborough street, Westminster, from 8 November 1837.

A paragraph in the Record of (perhaps) 8 May 1839 contained a candid appraisal of one of the South Australian Company's representatives in the colony, which drew the ire of Robert Torrens, who recommended to the Governor that he publicly disown the statement as an "error" on Capper's part. Rather than submit to this insult, Capper resigned from his position with the Colonization Office, but continued publishing the Record.

The South Australian Record became briefly South Australian Record and Australasian Chronicle in 1840, became the South Australian Record and Australasian and South African Chronicle then in March 1841 the Australasian Record which ran to either late 1843 or early 1844.

== Books ==
Capper assembled two compendia of advice and useful information for intending emigrants, aimed at two distinct classes of prospective emigrants.

- South Australia First edition November 1837 but greatly expanded in second edition May 1838, entitled South Australia: Containing Hints to Emigrants, Proceedings of the South Australian Company, a Variety of Useful and Authentic Information, a Map of the Eastern Coast of Gulf St. Vincent and a Plan of Adelaide This book, which went to at least four editions, is available as a recent (2018) imprint of Sagwan Press.
- How to Get to South Australia, being information for Labouring Emigrants respecting the above Colony. First published in October 1839, this publication went through at least four editions, the third being freely available to read here.

In 1840 Simpkin and Marshall produced a booklet in which large sections were copied from How to Get to South Australia.

== Other activities ==
Capper was the emigration clerk to the Colonization Commissioners, South Australian Colonization Office at Adelphi, London.

Capper was also a partner in the shipping firm of Capper and (Abraham) Gole, who in October 1840 were appointed agents by the Colonization Commissioners for the sale of land in South Australia.

In 1845 the firm of Capper and Gole was declared bankrupt. There is no reason to believe Capper ever visited Australasia.

In 1839 Capper established the Colonial Reading Rooms. These combined the functions of a bookseller with that of a shipping agent, and provided access to emigrant guides, pamphlets, journals and colonial papers. Initially located at 11 Park Street Westminster, close to the Colonial Land and Emigration Commission (CLEC) offices at 9 Park Street. By 1851, the reading rooms had moved to 6 Charing Cross, in the bookselling area of London. Capper continued to operate his reading rooms until at least 1856.

== Not to be confused with... ==
Despite the obvious similarity in titles of their respective books, there appears to be no family or other connection between Henry Capper and Orientalist John Capper F.R.A.S. (c. 1814 – 1898), author of The Emigrant's Guide to Australia, which is mostly concerned the goldfields of New South Wales and Victoria. Its chapter on South Australia is particularly trenchant.
