= Copper Lake (Whatcom County, Washington) =

- Location within Washington (state) Location within the United States
- Location: North Cascades National Park, Whatcom County, Washington, United States
- Coordinates: 48°55′05″N 121°27′03″W
- Type: Alpine lake
- Basin countries: United States
- Max. length: 300 yd (270 m)
- Max. width: 200 yd (180 m)
- Surface elevation: 5,269 ft (1,606 m)

Copper Lake is located in North Cascades National Park, in the U. S. state of Washington. Copper Lake lies along the route followed by the Copper Ridge Trail, which is accessed from a trailhead in Mount Baker National Forest. The hike to the lake is over 11 mi (18 km) one-way and includes an altitude gain of almost 2,000 ft (610 m). Copper Lake is .75 mi (1.21 km) northeast of the Copper Mountain Fire Lookout.
