= Baron Cooper =

Baron Cooper may be:

- Baron Cooper (peerage), A subsidiary title of the Earl of Shaftesbury
- Thomas Cooper, 1st Baron Cooper of Culross (1892–1955), Scottish politician, judge and historian
- Jack Cooper, Baron Cooper of Stockton Heath (1908–1988), British politician and trade union leader
- Andrew Cooper, Baron Cooper of Windrush
