= Copper (surname) =

Copper is the surname of the following notable people:

- Copper family, an English family of folk singers
- Basil Copper (1924–2013), English writer and journalist
- Kahleah Copper (born 1994), American basketball player
- Terrance Copper (born 1982), American footballer
