= The South Australian Record =

Newspaper in SA, Australia, active 1840

The South Australian Record was an English newspaper founded in London in 1837 specialising in news about South Australia, directed at potential investors and emigrants to that British colony. It was founded by Henry Capper, emigration clerk with the South Australian Colonization Office at Adelphi, London, who was editor and part owner. During its five year existence the paper went through several changes of name and ambit.

== History ==
The Record was at first published monthly (price 5d.) by Capper and John Gliddon from an office at 37 Great Marlborough street, Westminster, from 8 November 1837.

A paragraph in the Record of (perhaps) 8 May 1839 contained a candid appraisal of one of the South Australian Company's representatives in the colony, which drew the ire of Robert Torrens, who recommended to the Governor that he publicly disown the statement as an "error" on Capper's part. Rather than submit to this insult, Capper resigned from his position with the Colonization Office, but continued publishing the Record.

The South Australian Record became briefly South Australian Record and Australasian Chronicle in 1840, became the South Australian Record and Australasian and South African Chronicle then in March 1841 the Australasian Record which ran to either late 1843 or early 1844.

=== Digitization ===
Copies of the

- South Australian Record from 8 November 1837 to 15 January 1840 and
- South Australian Record and Australasian Chronicle published weekly from 22 February 1840 to 2 May 1840 and
- South Australian Record and Australasian and South African Chronicle published weekly (some issues missing) from 9 May 1840 to 24 February 1841

have been digitized by the National Library of Australia and may be accessed using Trove.
