= John Capper (editor) =

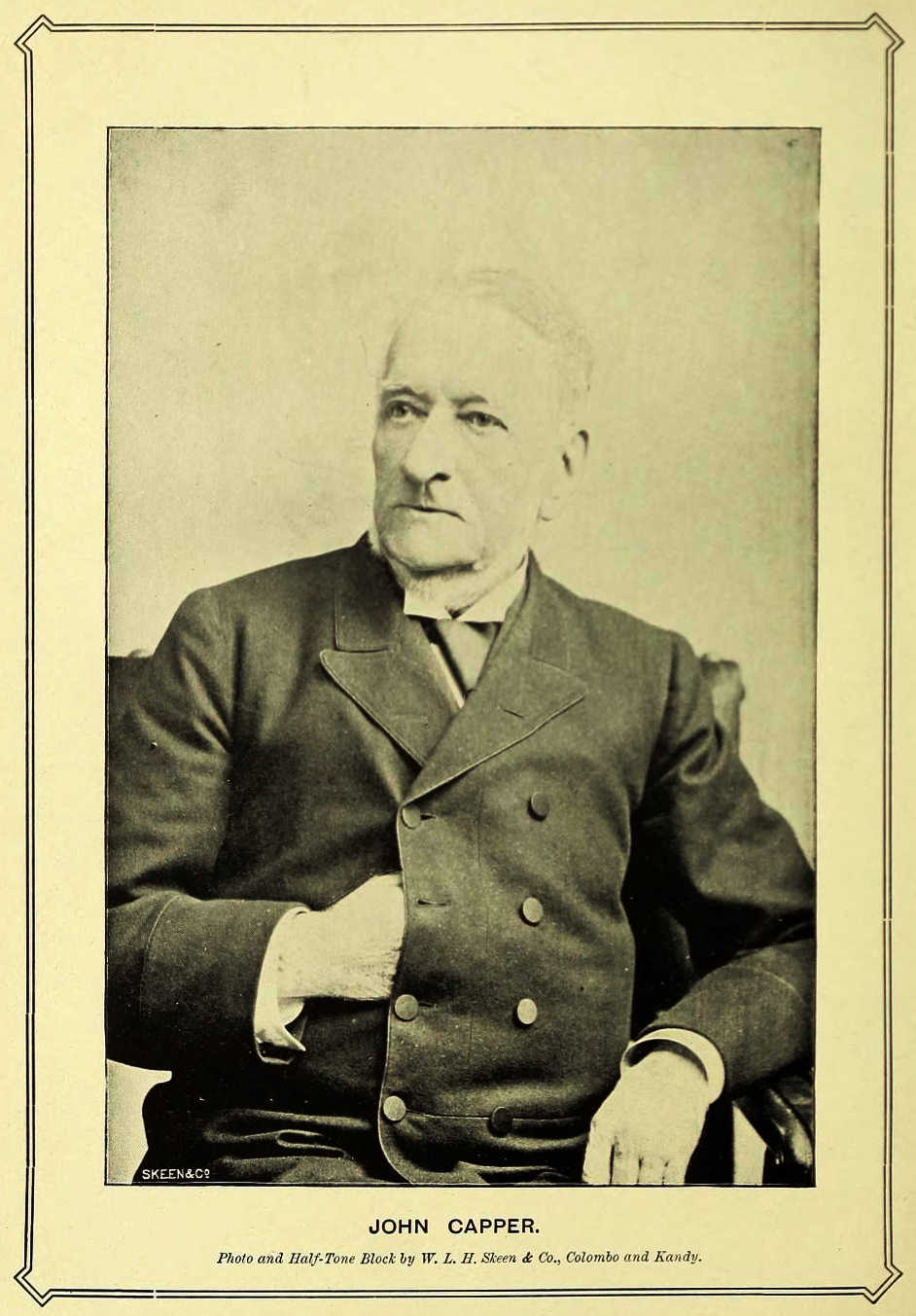
John Capper

John Capper F.R.A.S. (29 September 1814 – 31 March 1898) was a writer and Orientalist, particularly noted for his association with Ceylon (present day Sri Lanka) and his editorship of The Times of Ceylon.

== History ==
Capper was born in Lambeth, Surrey, London to Benjamin Pitts Capper (c. 1773 – c. 1850) and Maria Margaret Capper, ne Bessell (c. 1780 – c. 1844)

Capper joined the coffee wholesale business of Acland & Boyd, by whom in 1837 he was sent to Ceylon to manage the company's cinnamon and coconut oil interests, and where he oversaw the clearing of much native vegetation for the establishment of new coffee plantations.

Capper had some journalistic experience as co-editor of The Mining and Steam Navigation Gazette, and founded The Ceylon Magazine, which ran from 1840 to 1842. It was a serious, scholarly magazine, which served to bring together a group of like-minded individuals who in 1845 formed the Ceylon Branch of the Royal Asiatic Society, with Capper as treasurer. When the Ceylon Examiner was founded on 7 September 1846, Bessell was its editor and Capper the chief contributor.

1847 saw the collapse of the coffee market, and Acland & Boyd suspended operations. Capper returned to London, where he threw himself into journalistic activity: he wrote articles on Ceylon for Charles Dickens' Household Words (uncredited, as was Dickens' custom), and The Emigrant's Guide to Australia chiefly aimed at hopeful diggers, the Australian gold rush then being in full swing. Next came The Three Presidencies of India: A History of the Rise and Progress of the British Indian Possessions, which enjoyed a considerable market and praise from critics. A few more books of advice to the prospective emigrant "down under" followed, then his first about Ceylon, Pictures from the East, with illustrations by J. L. K. van Dort. He would collaborate with van Dort again, in The Duke of Edinburgh in Ceylon, a record of Prince Alfred's 1870 tour of the island. During the ten years Capper was in London, he also served as sub-editor of The Globe.

Capper returned to Ceylon in 1858, and purchased the twice-weekly Ceylon Times, which he edited with considerable skill and effort but little financial return until 1874, when he sold the newspaper.

Capper, now an establishment figure, had unofficial membership of Ceylon’s Legislative Council. On 15 November 1864, he and five other unofficial members — two British and three Ceylonese — resigned in protest at the Government's stringent fiscal policies, and in 1865 formed the Ceylon League, which acted as a thorn in the side of the newly-appointed Sir Hercules Robinson's government.

In 1874 he sold the Ceylon Times, left the island, and was involved in promoting the tea industry.

In the meantime, The Ceylon Times had become moribund and been liquidated. In 1882 he returned to Ceylon, and with his sons Frank Augustus Capper and Herbert Henry Capper revived it as The Times of Ceylon, an evening daily, which became the island's leading English-language newspaper.

Capper died in Fulham, Middlesex, England, aged 83 years.

== Selected publications ==
- The Emigrant's Guide to Australia, mostly concerned the goldfields of New South Wales and Victoria. A copy of the second edition may be viewed here, A later edition (1855), also published in Liverpool, was advertised as "J. Capper's 'Philips' Emigrants' Guide to Australia, Containing the fullest Particulars relating to Gold Digging, Cattle-Rearing, Sheep-Breeding, Mining, etc." At least three editions of the Guide had issued by 1856, and a facsimile edition was published by Hawthorn Press of Melbourne, Victoria in 1973. It should not be confused with earlier, similarly titled publications by Henry Capper, who may be unrelated.
- The Three Presidencies of India: A History of the Rise and Progress of the British Indian Possessions (London, 1853), which may be freely viewed here.
- Pictures from the East, illustrated by J. L. K. van Dort, (London, 1854)
- The Duke of Edinburgh in Ceylon: A book of elephant and elk sport, illustrated by J. L. K. van Dort, (London, 1871)

== Family ==
On 5 November 1839 in St Paul's Church, Kandy, Sri Lanka Capper married Anna Amelia Ackland (1823– ), daughter of the founder of Ackland & Boyd. On 13 June 1859 in St Leonards Church, Shoreditch, Middlesex, England, he married Sarah Ann Richards (1831-1911). Two of his sons Frank (1859-1937) and Herbert (1856-1905) profitably managed The Times of Ceylon after Capper retired to England.
