= Koppers (surname) =

Koppers is a surname. Notable people with it include:

- Dico Koppers (born 1992), Dutch footballer
- Heinrich Koppers (1872–1941), German engineer. Founder of the chemicals manufacturer Koppers Company in Chicago, Illinois (later moved to Pittsburgh, Pennsylvania), United States.
- Wilhelm Koppers (1886–1961), Austrian Catholic priest and anthropologist

== See also ==
- Kopper (disambiguation)
